= List of equipment of the Armed Forces of Ukraine =

The list of equipment of the Armed Forces of Ukraine can be subdivided into: infantry weapons, vehicles, aircraft, watercraft, and clothing. Due to the ongoing Russian invasion of Ukraine, quantities of operational equipment are highly uncertain.

== Infantry weapons ==
=== Pistols and submachine guns ===
Model	Image	Origin	Variant	Caliber	Details
Pistols
TT		Soviet Union	TT-33	7.62×25mm Tokarev	Limited use, mostly by Territorial Defense Forces units.
PSM		Soviet Union		5.45×18mm	Used by high-ranking officers and government officials.
Makarov PM		Soviet Union		9×18mm Makarov	Standard issue pistol.
PB		Soviet Union		9×18mm Makarov	Integrally suppressed pistol.
Fort-12		Ukraine		9×18mm Makarov	
Fort-14		Ukraine	Fort-14TP	9×18mm Makarov	In 2019, it was expected to gradually replace the aging Makarov.
Fort-17		Ukraine		9×18mm Makarov	
vz. 82		Czechoslovakia		9×18mm Makarov	30,150 supplied by the Czech Republic
Glock 17		Austria		9×19mm Parabellum	Used by special forces.
H&K SFP9		Germany	SFP9 SF; SFP9 TR	9×19mm Parabellum	3,500 supplied by Germany.
Beretta M9		United States		9×19mm Parabellum	
Kimber R7 Mako		United States		9×19mm Parabellum	
Machine pistols
APS		Soviet Union		9×18mm Makarov	Used by special forces.
Škorpion		Czechoslovakia	vz. 61	.32 ACP	2085 supplied with one million rounds by the Czech Republic
Submachine guns
Fort-224		Ukraine		9×19mm Parabellum	
CZ Scorpion Evo 3		Czech Republic		9×19mm Parabellum	
Uzi		Israel		9×19mm Parabellum	Limited usage.
Carl Gustaf m/45		Sweden	m/45A	9×19mm Parabellum	

=== Shotguns ===
Model	Image	Origin	Variant	Caliber	Details
Pump action
KS-23		Soviet Union		23×75mmR	
Fort-500		Ukraine	Fort-500M	12 gauge	
Mossberg 500		United States		12 gauge	
MKA 1919		Turkey		12 gauge	
M26 MASS		United States		12 Gauge	Limited use
Semi-automatic shotgun
Saiga-12		Russia		12 gauge	

=== Rifles ===
Model	Image	Origin	Variant	Caliber	Details
Assault and semi-automatic rifles
AKM		Soviet Union		7.62×39mm	Used by National Guard and Territorial Defence units.73 supplied by Germany
AKMS		Soviet Union Poland	AKMS Kbk AKMS	7.62×39mm	Limited use.
AK-74		Soviet Union; Russia	AK-74 AK-74M	5.45×39mm	Standard issue assault rifle.
AKS-74		Soviet Union		5.45×39mm	Used by paratroopers.
AK-12		Russia		5.45×39mm	Captured from Russian forces.
AR-15–style rifle		United States	Savage Arms MSR-15; Adams Arms P1	5.56×45mm NATO	
Fort-221		Ukraine		5.45×39mm	Ukrainian version of the IWI Tavor, produced under license.
M4-WAC-47		Ukraine		7.62×39mm 5.56×45mm NATO	Ukrainian copy of the M4 carbine.
UAR-15		Ukraine	UAR-15S; UAR-15S1; UAR-15SM	5.56×45mm NATO	Used by special forces and National Guard units.
IPI Malyuk		Ukraine		7.62×39mm 5.45×39mm 5.56×45mm NATO	Bullpup Kalashnikov rifle. Primarily used by special forces.
vz. 58		Czechoslovakia		7.62×39mm	5,000 supplied by the Czech Republic
Zastava M70		Yugoslavia		7.62×39mm	
Type 56		China	Type 56–1	7.62×39mm	Confiscated Iranian rifles.
FB Tantal		Poland		5.45×39mm	
FB MSBS Grot		Poland	MSBS Grot CA1; MSBS Grot CA2	5.56×45mm NATO	
CZ BREN 2		Czech Republic		5.56×45mm NATO; 7.62×39mm	To be produced locally.
FN FNC		Belgium		5.56×45mm NATO	
FN F2000		Belgium	F2000; F2000 Tactical	5.56×45mm NATO	Limited use.
FN SCAR		Belgium	SCAR-L	5.56×45mm NATO	4,000 FN SCAR-L and 25 SCAR-H rifles.
Colt Canada C7		Canada	C7A1	5.56×45mm NATO	
M16		United States	M16A4	5.56×45mm NATO	
Heckler & Koch HK416		Germany		5.56×45mm NATO	At least 4750 supplied by Germany. Supplied by Netherlands
Heckler & Koch G36		Germany	G36KA4	5.56×45mm NATO	
Heckler & Koch G95		Germany		5.56×45mm NATO	
Heckler & Koch HK433		Germany	HK433	5.56×45mm NATO	
Australian Combat Assault Rifle		Australia		5.56×45mm NATO; 7.62×51mm NATO	Limited use.
Haenel MK 556		Germany		5.56×45mm NATO	5,800 supplied by Germany
SIG Sauer SIG516		United States		5.56x45mm NATO	Used by the SBU and GUR
Steyr AUG		Austria	F88 Austeyr	5.56×45mm NATO	
CETME Model L		Spain		5.56×45mm NATO	Limited use
FAMAS		France	Félin FAMAS	5.56×45mm NATO	1,000
Carbines
AKS-74U		Soviet Union		5.45×39mm	Standard issue assault carbine.
Fort-224		Ukraine		5.45×39mm	Carbine version of the IWI Tavor, produced under license.
Kel-Tec SUB-2000		United States		9×19mm Parabellum	
M4 carbine		United States	M4A1	5.56×45mm NATO	Used by special forces.
Colt Canada C8		Canada		5.56×45mm NATO	
Battle rifles
Heckler & Koch G3		Germany		7.62×51mm NATO	1,000 from Portugal 3,769 from Germany
FN FAL		Belgium	FAL; FAL Type 3 PARA	7.62×51mm NATO	
M14		United States		7.62×51mm NATO	
Haenel CR308		Germany		7.62x51mm NATO	At least 881 from Germany
Designated marksman rifles
SVD		Soviet Union		7.62×54mmR	Replaced by the UAR-10 and Western sniper rifles.12 supplied by the Czech Republic.
Sniper rifles
Fort-301		Ukraine		7.62×51mm NATO	Licensed copy of the IWI Galatz.
Zbroyar Z-008		Ukraine	VPR-308	7.62×51mm NATO	Used by the National Guard.
UAR-10		Ukraine		7.62×51mm NATO	
Accuracy International Arctic Warfare		United Kingdom	AX308	7.62×51mm NATO	
M110 SASS		United States		7.62×51mm NATO	Limited use by special forces.
Kimber Advanced Tactical		United States		.308 Winchester	
Sako TRG		Finland		7.62×51mm NATO.338 Lapua Magnum	
Barrett MRAD		United States		7.62×51mm NATO.338 Lapua Magnum	
M24 SWS		United States		7.62×51mm NATO.338 Lapua Magnum	
Savage Model 110		United States		.338 Lapua Magnum	
Cadex Defence CDX-33 TAC		Canada		.338 Lapua Magnum	
Haenel HLR 338		Germany		.338 Lapua Magnum	At least 484 supplied by Germany
Anti-materiel rifles
PTRD-41		Soviet Union		14.5×114mm	Used in the counter-sniping role.
Snipex Alligator		Ukraine		14.5×114mm	Used by special forces.
Snipex T-Rex		Ukraine		14.5×114mm	Used by special forces.
MCR Horizon's Lord		Ukraine		12.7×114mm	
Barrett M82		United States Sweden	M82; M107A1 AG 90	.50 BMG	
PGW LTR-3		Canada		.50 BMG	
ZVI Falcon		Czech Republic	OP99	.50 BMG	19 supplied by the Czech Republic
WKW Wilk		Poland		.50 BMG	

=== Machine guns ===
Model	Image	Origin	Variant	Caliber	Details
Light machine guns
DP		Soviet Union	DPM	7.62×54mmR	Previously in storage, returned to service after 2014.
RPD		Soviet Union		7.62×39mm	Previously in storage, returned to service after 2014.
RPK		Soviet Union		7.62×39mm	Previously in storage, returned to service after 2014.
RPK-74		Soviet Union		5.45×39mm	Standard issue.
Fort-101		Ukraine		5.56×45mm NATO	Licensed version of the IWI Negev.
FN Minimi		Belgium Canada	Minimi C9	5.56×45mm NATO	
M249 SAW		United States		5.56×45mm NATO	
CETME Ameli		Spain		5.56×45mm NATO	
General-purpose machine guns
PK		Soviet Union Bulgaria	PK; PKM MG-1M	7.62×54mmR	Standard issue.
UK vz. 59		Czechoslovakia		7.62×54mmR	3,200 supplied by the Czech Republic
Zastava M53		Yugoslavia		7.92×57mm Mauser	
UKM-2000		Poland	UKM-2000P	7.62×51mm NATO	
FN MAG		Belgium Canada	MAG C6	7.62×51mm NATO	
Ksp 58		Sweden	Ksp 58B	7.62×51mm NATO	
M240		United States		7.62×51mm NATO	
Rheinmetall MG 3		Germany Italy	MG 3 MG 42/59	7.62×51mm NATO	At least 268 supplied by Germany
Heckler & Koch MG4		Germany		5.56×45mm NATO	At least 200 supplied by Germany
Heckler & Koch MG5		Germany		7.62×51mm NATO	At least 450 supplied by Germany
Heavy machine guns
PM M1910		Russian Empire; Soviet Union	M1910/30	7.62×54mmR	Previously in storage, returned to service after 2014.
DShK		Soviet Union	DShKM	12.7×108mm	Previously in storage, returned to service after 2014.
NSV		Soviet Union Ukraine	NSV KT-12.7	12.7×108mm	Standard issue.
KPV		Soviet Union		14.5×114mm	Vehicle-mounted.
M2 Browning		United States Turkey	M2HB Canik M2	.50 BMG	

=== Hand grenades ===
Model	Image	Origin	Variant	Caliber	Details
Defensive grenades
F-1		Soviet Union		55 mm	
RGD-5		Soviet Union; Bulgaria		58 mm	
RGO		Soviet Union		60 mm	Limited use.
DM51		Germany	DM51A2	57 mm	
M67		United States Canada	M67 C-13	64 mm	
m/963		Portugal		57 mm	
Sirpalekäsikranaatti M50		Finland		50 mm	
GHO-1		Bulgaria			
F1 grenade		Australia		58mm	
Offensive grenades
RGN		Soviet Union		60 mm	
OF 37 HE		France		60 mm	
Anti-tank grenades
RKG-3		Soviet Union Ukraine	RKG-3EM RKG-1600	56 mm	Old Soviet stockpiles were used during the War in Donbas. Domestically modified grenades are also used.
Thermobaric grenades
RTG-27		Ukraine	RTG-27S; RTG-27S2		
RG-60TB		Russia		60 mm	Captured from Russian forces.
Smoke grenades
DG-01		Ukraine			Replacing Soviet smoke grenades.
M18		United States			
Merkkisavuheite 80–16		Finland			
RDG-M		Russia			Captured from Russian forces.

==== Grenade launchers ====
Model	Image	Origin	Variant	Caliber	Details
Underbarrel grenade launcher
GP-25 Kostyor		Soviet Union	Black Storm Defender	40 mm VOG-25	
M320 Grenade Launcher Module		United States		40×46mm	Used by special forces.
Stand-alone grenade launchers
RGSh-30		Ukraine		30×29mm	Used by special forces.
Fort-600		Ukraine	Fort-600A	40×46mm	Used by paratroopers.
RGP-40		Poland		40×46mm	Used by special forces.
M32 MGL		South Africa	M32A1	40×46mm	
GM-94		Russia		43×30mm	
Automatic grenade launcher
AGS-17		Soviet Union		30×29mm	
UAG-40		Ukraine		40×53mm	
Mk 19		United States		40×53 mm	
Heckler & Koch GMG		Germany		40×53 mm	

==== Anti-tank/structure ====
Model	Image	Origin	Variant	Caliber	Details
Recoilless weapons
SPG-9		Soviet Union Bulgaria	SPG-9M ATGL-H	73 mm	Used by the AFU, National Guard, and the State Border Service.
Carl Gustaf		Sweden	M2	84 mm	
Pansarvärnspjäs 1110		Sweden		90 mm	
RPG-75		Czechoslovakia	RPG-75M	68 mm	
AT4		Sweden		84 mm	Used by special forces.
MATADOR		Germany	RGW 90	90 mm	16,917 supplied by Germany
APILAS		France		112 mm	
Rocket propelled grenades
RPG-7		Soviet Union United States	RPG-7 PSRL-1	40 mm	
RPG-18		Soviet Union		64 mm	
RPG-22		Soviet Union Bulgaria	RPG-22 Bulspike-AT	72.5 mm	Used by special forces.
RPG-26		Soviet Union		72.5 mm	
RPG-76 Komar		Poland		40 mm	
M80 Zolja		Yugoslavia		64 mm	
Panzerfaust 3		Germany		60 mm	
M72 LAW		United States		66 mm	Used by the Special Operations Forces.
C90		Spain	C-90CR	90 mm	
Anti-tank guided missiles
9K111 Fagot		Soviet Union Bulgaria	9K111 9M111MFB-1 Faktoria	120 mm	
9K113 Konkurs		Soviet Union		135 mm	
9K115-2 Metis-M		Russia		130 mm	
Barrier		Ukraine		130 mm	Fitted to BTR-3s, BTR-4s, and BMP-1s.
Kombat		Ukraine		125 mm	Used on T-64/72/80/84 tanks.
Stugna-P		Ukraine	Stugna-P; Skif	130 mm 152 mm	
RK-3 Corsar		Ukraine		105 mm	
MILAN		France; Germany	MILAN 2T	115 mm	
NLAW		Sweden; United Kingdom		150 mm	Used by special forces.
FGM-148 Javelin		United States		127 mm	In service since 2018.
BGM-71 TOW		United States		152 mm	Mounted on Humvees and M2 Bradleys.
Anti-fortification
Bangalore torpedo		United States	M1A3	54 mm	
M141 Bunker Defeat Munition		United States		83.5 mm	Used by special forces.
Mk 153 SMAW		United States		83.5 mm	
Bunkerfaust		Germany		110 mm	
Flamethrowers
RPO-A Shmel		Soviet Union		93 mm	
RPV-16		Ukraine		93 mm	Used by CBRN defense forces.

=== Man-portable air-defense systems ===
Name	Image	Origin	Variant	Caliber	Details
Man-portable air-defense systems
9K32 Strela-2		Soviet Union		72 mm	
9K34 Strela-3		Soviet Union		72 mm	
9K310 Igla-1		Soviet Union		72 mm	Used by the National Guard.
9K38 Igla		Soviet Union		72 mm	Used by the Ground Forces and National Guard.
FN-6		China		72mm	Limited use.
PPZR Piorun		Poland		72 mm	Used by the Ground Forces, Air Assault Forces, and National Guard.
Starstreak		United Kingdom		130 mm	
Martlet		United Kingdom	LMM	76 mm	Used by the Ground Forces and Air Assault Forces.
Mistral		France		90 mm	
FIM-92 Stinger		United States		70 mm	
RBS-70		Sweden		106 mm	In April 2024, Australia announced that it would donate their RBS-70 to Ukraine.

=== Mortars ===
==== Light mortars ====
Model	Image	Origin	Caliber	Details
KBA-118		Ukraine	60 mm	
M60A Kamerton		Ukraine	60 mm	
LMP-2017		Poland	60 mm	Donated by Poland.
M224		United States	60 mm	Seen in hands of Ukrainian soldiers.
M60CMA		Bulgaria	60 mm	Seen in hands of Ukrainian soldiers.
M84		Croatia	60 mm	Seen in hands of Ukrainian soldiers.
FBP Morteirete		Portugal	60 mm	Donated by Portugal in 2023.
82-BM-37		Soviet Union	82mm	
2B14 Podnos		Soviet Union	82mm	Reportedly used in the War in Donbas.
KBA-48M		Ukraine	82mm	
UPIK-82		Ukraine	82mm	More than 300 delivered in 2020.
HM-19		Iran	82mm	It is unclear how they arrived in Ukraine, but the most likely scenario is that they were seized from Iranian shipments to the Houthis and donated during the Russian invasion of Ukraine.
M69A		Yugoslavia	82mm	Seen in use with the Armed Forces of Ukraine.
20N5		Azerbaijan	82mm	Seen in use with the Armed Forces of Ukraine.

==== Heavy mortars ====
Model	Image	Origin	Caliber	Details
2B11		Soviet Union	120 mm	10 donated by Lithuania in 2022.
2S12 Sani		Soviet Union	120 mm	100 in service as of 2024.
M120-15 Molot		Ukraine	120 mm	60 in service as of 2024.
MP-120		Ukraine	120 mm	Adopted in January 2022, it is gradually replacing the M120-15 Molot.
EM-120		Bulgaria	120 mm	140 in service as of 2024.
120 Krh 85 92		Finland	120 mm	
HM-16		Iran	120 mm	Confiscated Iranian weapons, possibly supplied by the United States or other allied countries.
MO-120 RT 61		France	120 mm	24 donated by Belgium, France, and the Netherlands.
120mm mortar vz. 1982		Czechoslovakia	120 mm	Unknown number provided by the Czech Republic in 2022.
M120 Mortar System		United States; Israel	120 mm	50 donated by Denmark and the United States.

=== Land mines ===
==== Anti-personnel mines ====
Model	Image	Origin	Type	Caliber	Details
MON-50		Soviet Union	Command/Tripwire	700 g RDX	
MON-90		Soviet Union	Command/Tripwire	6.2 kg RDX	
MON-100		Soviet Union	Command/Tripwire	2 kg TNT	
MON-200		Soviet Union	Command/Tripwire	12 kg TNT	Seen in use during the Russian invasion of Ukraine.
OZM-72		Soviet Union	Command/Tripwire	660 g TNT	
PFM-1		Soviet Union	Pressure	40 g liquid explosive	Reportedly used in 2022 against Russian forces in Izium.
M18 Claymore		United States	Command/Tripwire	680 g C4	Donated by the United States in response to the Russian invasion of Ukraine.

==== Anti-tank mines ====
Model	Image	Origin	Type	Caliber	Details
TM-62M		Soviet Union	Pressure	7.5 kg TNT	
TM-72		Soviet Union	Magnetic	2.5 kg TNT + RDX	
AT2		Germany	Pressure	907 g RDX + TNT	Donated by the German government in response to the Russian invasion of Ukraine.
FFV 028		Sweden	Magnetic	5 kg RDX	3,000 were donated by the German government in response to the Russian invasion of Ukraine.
DM-12 PARM 2		Germany	Off-route	1.4 kg	Donated by the German government in response to the Russian invasion of Ukraine.
RAAM		United States	Pressure		The United States supplied 9,000 155 mm rounds of Remote Anti-Armor Mine Systems (RAAMS).
HP2A2		France	Seismic/Magnetic		First spotted in Ukraine during July 2022.
PK-14		Estonia	Off-route		Donated by Estonia, first spotted in Ukraine in September 2022.

== Combat vehicles ==
=== Tanks ===
==== Main battle tanks ====
Model	Image	Origin	Variant	Number	Details
Main battle tanks
T-55		Soviet Union	M-55S	26	
T-62		Soviet Union	Captured: T-62M; T-62MV	?	Some captured Russian tanks are used by Territorial Defense units.
T-64		Soviet Union; Ukraine	T-64BV; T-64BV mod. 2017; T-64BM "Bulat"; T-64BM2 "Bulat"	200+	Used by the Ground Forces, Marines, and National Guard.
T-72		Soviet Union; Ukraine; Russia; Czechoslovakia; Czech Republic; Poland	T-72AMT; T-72AV; T-72AV mod. 2021; T-72B1; T-72B3; T-72EA; T-72M1; T-72M1R	520+	Used by the Ground Forces and National Guard units. Captured Russian tanks and vehicles donated by NATO allies are also used.
T-80		Soviet Union; Russia; Ukraine	T-80BV; T-80BV mod T-80BVM; T-80U; T-80UK	80+	Used by the Ground Forces and Air Assault Forces. Some captured Russian T-80BVMs and T-80UKs were pressed into service.
M-84		Yugoslavia	M-84A4	30	30 to be provided by Croatia.
T-84 Oplot		Ukraine		5	
T-90		Russia	Captured: T-90A; T-90M	?	Captured from Russian forces. Used by the Ground Forces and National Guard units.
PT-91 Twardy		Poland		26	
Leopard 1		West Germany	Leopard 1A5 Leopard 1A5BE	103	Donated by the Netherlands, Germany and Denmark. 195 pledged as of 9 November 2023.
Leopard 2		Germany	Leopard 2A4 Leopard 2A6 Strv 122	60	Donated by several countries.
Challenger 2		United Kingdom		13	Used by the Air Assault Forces.
M1 Abrams		United States	M1A1SA; M1A1 AIM	22+ 0/49	Donated by the United States. 49 M1A1 AIM to be donated by Australia. As of July 2025, the majority of the Australian tanks had been delivered to Ukraine.

=== Tank destroyers ===
Model	Image	Origin	Type	Variant	Number	Details
9P149		Soviet Union	Tracked tank destroyer		N/A	
MT-LB		Soviet Union; Ukraine	Tracked tank destroyer	MT-LB-12		Improvised self-propelled 100mm MT-12 "Rapira" anti-tank gun.
9P148		Soviet Union; Ukraine	Wheeled tank destroyer	9P148 Konkurs; 9P148 Amulet	4+	Some upgraded with Stugna-P launchers.
AMX-10 RC		France	Wheeled tank destroyer	AMX-10 RCR	35	Used by the Marine Corps.

=== Armored fighting vehicles ===
Model	Image	Origin	Type	Variant	Number	Details
Armored fighting vehicles
BRM-1(K)		Soviet Union	Tracked reconnaissance vehicle		50	
BPzV Svatava		Czechoslovakia	Tracked reconnaissance vehicle		N/A	Donated by the Czech Republic.
FV107 Scimitar		United Kingdom	Tracked reconnaissance vehicle	Scimitar Mk 2	23	23 to be provided by the United Kingdom.
BRDM-2		Soviet Union; Ukraine	Wheeled reconnaissance vehicle	BRDM-2; BRDM-2L1; BRDM-2T	120	
Fennek		Germany; Netherlands	Wheeled reconnaissance vehicle		8	Donated by the Netherlands.
Ferret		United Kingdom	Wheeled reconnaissance vehicle	Ferret Mk 1	1	
Infantry fighting vehicles (wheeled and tracked)
BMP-1		Soviet Union; Ukraine; Russia; Czechoslovakia	Tracked infantry fighting vehicle	BMP-1; BMP-1AK; BMP-1TS; BMP-1U; BVP-1; BWP-1	400+	Used by the Ground Forces and Marines.
BMP-2		Soviet Union; Russia	Tracked infantry fighting vehicle		400+	Used by the Ground Forces and National Guard.
PbV-501		Czech Republic	Tracked infantry fighting vehicle	PbV-501A	54	
BMP-3		Soviet Union; Russia	Tracked infantry fighting vehicle		40+	Used by the Ground Forces and Marines.
BMD-2		Soviet Union	Tracked airborne infantry fighting vehicle		?	Used by the Air Assault Forces.
YPR-765		United States; Netherlands	Tracked infantry fighting vehicle		353	Used by the Ground Forces and National Guard.
BVP M-80		Yugoslavia	Tracked infantry fighting vehicle	BVP M-80A	28	
Marder		West Germany	Tracked infantry fighting vehicle		140	Donated by Germany. Used by the Air Assault Forces.
Bradley		United States	Tracked infantry fighting vehicle	M2A2 ODS; M7 Bradley FiST	300+	
CV90		Sweden	Tracked infantry fighting vehicle	CV9040	48	1000 more to be built during a joint venture between Sweden and Ukraine.
Pansarbandvagn 302		Sweden	Tracked infantry fighting vehicle		200+	Sweden will donate its entire stock.
BTR-3		Ukraine	Wheeled armored personnel carrier/Infantry fighting vehicle	BTR-3DA; BTR-3E1; BTR-3M2	?	Used by the Ground Forces, Air Assault Forces and National Guard.
BTR-4		Ukraine	Wheeled infantry fighting vehicle	BTR-4; BTR-4E; BTR-4MV1	?	Used by the Ground Forces, Air Assault Forces and National Guard.
BTR-80		Russia	Wheeled infantry fighting vehicle	Captured: BTR-82A; BTR-82AM	75+	
KTO Rosomak		Poland	Wheeled infantry fighting vehicle		90	
Mbombe 6		South Africa	Wheeled infantry fighting vehicle		?	Seen in use, equipped with Spear combat module [uk].
Armoured personnel carriers (wheeled and tracked)
MT-LB		Soviet Union	Tracked armoured personnel carrier	MT-LB; MT-LBu; MT-LBVM; MT-LBVMK	125+	Used by the Ground Forces and Marines.
GT-MU		Soviet Union	Airborne tracked armoured personnel carrier		N/A	
BTR-D		Soviet Union	Airborne tracked armoured personnel carrier		40	Some captured Russian vehicles are used.
BTR-MDM		Russia	Airborne tracked armoured personnel carrier			At least one captured BTR-MD was converted into an armored ambulance.
M113		United States	Tracked armoured personnel carrier	M113A1; M113AS4; M113G3DK; M113G4DK	510	
FV103 Spartan		United Kingdom	Tracked armoured personnel carrier		30	
FV105 Sultan		United Kingdom	Tracked armoured personnel carrier		N/A	Multiple were purchased for the Ukrainian Ground Forces by former President Petro Poroshenko.
FV430 Bulldog		United Kingdom	Tracked armoured personnel carrier	FV432 Mk 3	N/A	Donated by the United Kingdom.
Bandvagn		Sweden	Tracked armoured personnel carrier	Bandvagn BvS 10; Bandvagn BV-206S'	92+	Donated by the Netherlands, Italy, and Germany.
BTR-60		Soviet Union; Ukraine; Romania	Wheeled armoured personnel carrier	BTR-60PB; BTR-60М TAB-71M	6 20	20 TAB-71Ms donated by Romania, while Bulgaria sent 100 BTR-60s as military aid.
BTR-70		Soviet Union; Ukraine	Wheeled armoured personnel carrier	BTR-70; BTR-70M; BTR-7	217	
BTR-80		Soviet Union; Ukraine	Wheeled armoured personnel carrier	BTR-80; BTR-80M	224	Some captured Russian vehicles are used.
VAB		France	Wheeled armoured personnel carrier		250	Used by the Air Assault Forces.
Patria Pasi		Finland	Wheeled armoured personnel carrier	Sisu XA-185	36	Used by the Ground Forces and Marines.
LAV 6		Canada	Wheeled armoured personnel carrier	ACSV	39	
Stryker		United States	Wheeled armoured personnel carrier		400+	Donated by the United States.
M1117		United States	Wheeled armoured personnel carrier		400+	Donated by the United States.
OT-64 SKOT		Poland	Wheeled armoured personnel carrier		1+?	Purchased by the Ukrainian scout organization Plast for the 103rd Separate Territorial Defense Brigade.
Valuk		Slovenia	Wheeled armoured personnel carrier		20	
BOV		Yugoslavia	Wheeled armoured personnel carrier		26	Donated by Slovenia.

=== Infantry mobility vehicles ===
Model	Image	Origin	Type	Variant	Number	Details
Varta		Ukraine	Protected car		80+	Used by the Ukrainian Ground Forces, Marines, and National Guard.
Kozak-2		Ukraine	Protected car	Kozak-2; Kozak-2M; Kozak-5; Kozak-7	?	Used by the Ukrainian Ground Forces and National Guard.
KrAZ Cobra		Ukraine	Protected car		10	Seen in use during the 2022 Russian invasion of Ukraine.
KrAZ Cougar		Ukraine	Protected car		?	Used by the National Guard.
KrAZ Spartan		Ukraine	Protected car		?	Used by Air Assault Forces and the National Guard.
Bogdan Bars-6		Ukraine	Protected car		?	
Bogdan Bars-8		Ukraine	Protected car		90	
Novator		Ukraine	Protected car		40	Delivered in 2019.
Ovid		Soviet Union; Ukraine	Protected car	GAZ-66	1	Prototype. Used by the Armed Forces of Ukraine.
Dozor-B		Ukraine; Poland	Protected mobility vehicle	Dozor-B Oncilla	? 100	Used by the Air Assault Forces.
Bushmaster		Australia	Protected mobility vehicle		75	Used by the Air Assault Forces.
Roshel Senator		Canada	Protected mobility vehicle		1000+	
Iveco LMV		Italy	Protected mobility vehicle	LMV	?	Used by the Ground Forces and Air Assault Forces.
Iveco VM 90P		Italy	Protected mobility vehicle	40.12 WM/P VM 90P	4 45	Donated by Portugal, Italy, and Germany.
AMZ Dzik		Poland	Protected mobility vehicle	Dzik-2	N/A	Supplied by Poland.
Snatch Land Rover		United Kingdom	Infantry mobility vehicle		7+	At least 7 ambulances were donated by Latvia in 2021.
Cougar		South Africa; United States	MRAP	Mastiff; Wolfhound	97	60 donated by the United Kingdom and 37 by the United States in 2022.
International M1224 MaxxPro		United States	MRAP	Unknown	440	
Husky TSV		United States	MRAP	International MXT-MV based	20	20 donated as part of a batch of 120 armoured personnel carriers sent by the United Kingdom.
Light Tactical Vehicles		United States	Infantry mobility vehicle	Unknown	200+	Donated by the United States.
Oshkosh M-ATV		United States	Infantry mobility vehicle	Unknown	200+	Donated by the United States.
Humvee		United States	Light infantry mobility vehicle	Unknown	5,000+	Supplied before and after the Russian invasion of Ukraine.
LC-79 APC-SH Fighter-2		United States	Light infantry mobility vehicle		11	Bought by Come Back Alive Foundation for Ukrainian Forces. LC-79 APC-SH Fighter-2 vehicles are based on the Toyota Land Cruiser 79.
GAZ-2975 Tigr		Russian Federation	Infantry mobility vehicle	Tigr; Tigr-M	7; 32	At least 1 captured vehicle in service with the Armed Forces of Ukraine.
Linza		Russian Federation	Infantry mobility vehicle	KamAZ-53949-Linza	1	At least 1 captured vehicle was repaired for the Armed Forces of Ukraine.
MLS Shield		Italy	Infantry mobility vehicle		11	11 bought from Italy during the 2022 Russian Invasion of Ukraine.
BMC Kirpi		Turkey	MRAP		170+	Used by Marines and Air Assault Forces.
ATF Dingo		Germany	MRAP	Dingo 2	43	
BATT UMG		United States	MRAP			116 received by the AFU between 2022 and 2023.
Gaia Amir		Israel	MRAP		Unknown	First seen in November 2022 during the Southern Ukraine campaign.
MSPV Panthera T6		United Arab Emirates; Turkey	Infantry mobility vehicle		?	
INKAS Titan-S		United Arab Emirates	Infantry mobility vehicle		Unknown	Delivered in December 2022.
BPM-97		Russian Federation	MRAP		3	Three seen captured from Russian forces.
KamAZ-63968 Typhoon-K		Russian Federation	MRAP		1	At least 1 captured vehicle used by the Ukrainian Ground Forces.
VPK-Ural		Russian Federation	Infantry mobility vehicle		1	At least one captured vehicle is used as a command vehicle.
GAZ-3937 'Vodnik'		Russian Federation	Infantry mobility vehicle		1	1 seen captured from Russian forces.
Mowag Eagle		Switzerland	Infantry mobility vehicle	Mowag Eagle I	11	Delivered to Ukraine by an undisclosed German private company without Swiss approval.
Otokar Cobra II		Turkey	Infantry mobility vehicle		Unknown	Delivered in May 2023.
HMT Exteda		United Kingdom	Infantry mobility vehicle	MK2	14	Donated by Australia.
Terradyne Gurkha		United States		LAPV	13	13 vehicles in 2023.

== Field artillery ==
=== Towed mortars and anti-tank guns ===
Model	Image	Origin	Type	Variant	Quantity	Details
2B9 Vasilek		Soviet Union	82 mm gun-mortar		?	
D-44		Soviet Union	85 mm field gun		?	Seen mounted on MT-LBs in the indirect fire support role.
D-48		Soviet Union	85 mm anti-tank gun		?	Reactivated after the Donbas war.
BS-3		Soviet Union	100 mm field gun/anti-tank gun		?	
T-12		Soviet Union	100 mm field gun/anti-tank gun	MT-12 Rapira	200+	Used by the Ground Forces and Marines.
2B16 Nona-K		Soviet Union	120 mm		2	Some captured Russian guns were pressed into AFU service.
M240		Soviet Union	240mm mortar		?	Reactivated for the AFU in 2022.

=== Self-propelled mortars ===
Model	Image	Origin	Caliber	Variant	Quantity	Details
M106		United States	107 mm			
2S9 Nona		Soviet Union; Ukraine; Russia	120 mm	2S9 Nona-SM; 2S17-2 Nona-SV Captured: 2S23 Nona-SVK	20+	Used by the Air Assault Forces.
Panzermörser M113		United States; Germany	120 mm		12	
M120 Rak		Poland	120 mm		24	
Alakran 120		Spain; Ukraine; United States	120 mm	Bars-8MMK; Scorpion		Mounted on a Bars-8 chassis or a modified Land Cruiser SUV.

=== Towed artillery ===
Model	Image	Origin	Caliber		Quantity	Details
Mod 56		Italy	105 mm	Mod 56	8	
M101		United States	105 mm	M101; M101A1	12+	9 M101A1 howitzers donated by Portugal in 2024.
L118		United Kingdom; United States	105 mm	L119; M119A3	100	Donated by the United Kingdom and United States To be locally produced and replace the D-30 howitzer.
D-30		Soviet Union	122 mm		60+	Used by the Ground Forces, Air Assault Forces and National Guard.
M-46		Soviet Union	130 mm		15	
D-20		Soviet Union; Romania	152 mm	D-20; M1981	50+	Used by the Ground Forces and Coastal Defence. Romanian M1981 guns also seen in use.
2A36 Giatsint-B		Soviet Union	152 mm	2A36 Giatsint-B; 152 K89	75+	Used by the Ground Forces and Marines.
2A65 Msta-B		Soviet Union	152 mm		70	
TRF1		France	155 mm		14	
FH-70		United Kingdom; West Germany; Italy	155 mm		20	
M777		United Kingdom; United States	155 mm	M777A2	130+	Used by the Ground Forces and Air Assault Forces.
M114		United States	155 mm	M114A1	70	Pledged by Greece.
2P22 Bohdana		Ukraine	155 mm		1+	At least one delivered to the 47th Separate Artillery Brigade.

=== Self-propelled artillery ===
Model	Image	Origin	Caliber	Variant	Number	Details
2S1 Gvozdika		Soviet Union	122 mm	2S1 Gvozdika; 2S1 Goździks; 122 PsH 74	125+	Used by the Ground Forces, Marines, and Air Assault Forces.
2S3 Akatsiya		Soviet Union	152 mm		120+	Used by the Ground Forces and Air Assault Forces.
2S5 Giatsint-S		Soviet Union	152 mm		?	Captured Russian guns seen in use with the Armed Forces of Ukraine.
2S19 Msta-S		Soviet Union	152 mm		35	
ShKH vz. 77 DANA		Czechoslovakia Czech Republic	152 mm	vz. 77 DANA DANA M2	12 ?	26 DANA M2 purchased in 2022.
2S22 Bohdana		Ukraine	155 mm		30	More than 10 are produced every month for the UGF. Towed version now in mass production.
CAESAR		France; Czech Republic	155 mm	Caesar 6x6 Caesar 8x8	26 17	An additional 78 to be produced in 2024 for Ukraine.
Archer Artillery System		Sweden	155 mm	Self-propelled artillery	8+(36)	8 donated by Sweden more systems on order by Sweden
PzH 2000		Germany	155 mm		28	
RCH 155		Germany	155 mm		36	To be delivered.
AHS Krab		Poland	155 mm		53	
ShKH Zuzana		Slovakia	155 mm	ShKH Zuzana 2	8	An additional 16 to be financed by Denmark, Germany, and Norway for Ukraine.
M109		United States	155 mm	M109A3GN M109A3DK; M109A4BE; M109A5Ö; M109L; M109A6 "Paladin"	90	
AS-90		United Kingdom	155 mm		20	
DITA		Czech Republic	155 mm		?	In February 2024 the Netherlands purchased 9 DITA's for the Armed Forces of Ukraine. In October 2024 the Netherlands announced that it plans to acquire an additional 6 DITA's for Ukraine.
2S7 Pion		Soviet Union	203 mm		20	Up to 83 guns were in storage prior to the Russian invasion.

=== Multiple rocket launchers ===
Model	Image	Origin	Caliber	Variant	Number	Details
BM-21 Grad		Soviet Union; Ukraine; Russia	122 mm	BM-21; Tornado-G	100+	Used by the Ground Forces and Air Assault Forces.
RM-70		Czechoslovakia; Czech Republic	122 mm	RM-70 RM-70 "Vampire"	1 8	One RM-70 was crowdfunded by Czech citizens.
APR-40		Romania	122 mm		4	
BM-21MT Striga		Czech Republic	122 mm		N/A	
BM-27 Uragan		Soviet Union; Ukraine	220 mm	BM-27 Uragan; BM-27 Bureviy	35+	Used by the Ground Forces and Coastal Defence.
TOS-1		Soviet Union; Russia	220 mm	Captured: TOS-1A		At least 1 captured TOS-1A in service with the Armed Forces of Ukraine.
M270		United States	227 mm	M270B; MARS II	23	
M142 HIMARS		United States	227 mm	M142	38	3 pledged by Germany.
TRG-230		Turkey	230 mm	TLRG-230	Unknown	As of January 2023, Turkey donated an unspecified number of TLRG-230s.
BM-30 Smerch		Soviet Union; Ukraine	300 mm	BM-30 Smerch; BM-30 Vilkha	40+	Possibly unserviceable.

== Ground and sea launched missile systems and artillery munitions ==
Model	Image	Origin	Type	Variant	Number	Details
OTR-21 Tochka		Soviet Union	Tactical/Short-range ballistic missile	Scarab-B		Possibly unserviceable.
MGM-140 ATACMS		United States	Tactical/Short-range ballistic missile	Block I	100+	Cluster rounds and long range single rounds supplied by the United States.
Multi-role missiles
Brimstone		United Kingdom	Short-range multi-role missile	Brimstone 1 Brimstone 2		Some used with truck-mounted launchers.
Advanced Precision Kill Weapon System		United States	Laser-guided		?	Supplied by the United States.
RIM-7		United States	Ship-borne short-range anti-aircraft and anti-missile weapon system		?	Supplied by the United States.
Ground Launched Small Diameter Bomb		United States; Sweden	Surface-to-surface missile		?	Supplied by the United States.
Anti-ship missiles
Maritime Brimstone		United Kingdom	Short range			
RBS-17		United States; Sweden	Short range	AGM-114C	210	
Neptune		Ukraine	Over-the-horizon	RK-360MC	?	Some were modified to strike ground targets.
Harpoon		United States	Over-the-horizon	RGM-84L-4		
Artillery munitions
VOG-17M		Bulgaria; Soviet Union	30mm High Explosive Grenade			Purchased from Bulgaria.
Type 63		China; Albania	60mm Mortar round			Donated by Albania.
HE60 MA		Bulgaria; Soviet Union	60mm Mortar round			Purchased from Bulgaria.
ARS-8KOM		Bulgaria; Soviet Union	80mm unguided rocket			Purchased from Bulgaria.
HE82M		Bulgaria; Soviet Union	82mm Mortar round			Purchased from Bulgaria.
3UBK2		Bulgaria; Soviet Union	100 mm High Explosive anti tank fragmentation shell			Purchased from Bulgaria.
JVA 1571		Finland	120 mm Mortar round			Donated by Finland.
HE120M		Bulgaria	120 mm Mortar round			Purchased from Bulgaria.
HE-843B		Soviet Union; Sudan	120 mm Mortar round			Some possibly purchased from Sudan by a third party state.
9M22		Soviet Union; Pakistan	122 mm Unguided artillery rocket			Soviet stockpiles, in addition to those secretly transferred from Pakistan by an unknown state.
LU111		France; Finland	155 mm High Explosive shell	155 tkr88		Donated by Finland.
SMArt 155		Germany	155 mm Guided Artillery shell			Donated by Germany.
Vulcano		Germany	155 mm Guided Artillery shell			Donated by Germany.
M712 Copperhead		United States	155 mm Guided Artillery shell			
M982 Excalibur		United States	155 mm Guided Artillery shell			Excalibur munitions were donated to the armed forces of Ukraine for use in M777 howitzers and AHS Krab following the 2022 Russian invasion of Ukraine.
M31A1		United States	227 mm Guided artillery rocket			Additional munitions donated by Germany.
In development
1KR1 Sapsan		Ukraine	Short-range ballistic missile/tactical ballistic missile	Hrim-2 TBM; OTRK Sapsan	1 prototype	Development completed and with official mass production started, with a range of 480 km and a maximum payload of about 1.5 tons. Planned to be slated for Ukrainian Ground Forces operations after acceptance.
Korshun-2		Ukraine	Short range cruise missile		TBA	In development, with a range of between 50 and 350 km and a payload of half a ton (around 450 kg). The missile has been in development since 2014.

== Air defense systems ==
Model	Origin	Variant	Notes
Surface-to-air missiles
S-300	Soviet Union	S-300V1; S-300PS; S-300PT; S-300PMU	
MIM-104 Patriot	United States	M902 PAC-3	
S-200	Soviet Union		Reactivated in 2024.
Buk	Soviet Union	9K37M Buk-M1	Modified to fire RIM-7 Sea Sparrow missiles.
IRIS-T	Germany	IRIS-T SLM; IRIS-T SLS	
MIM-23 HAWK	United States	MIM-23B I-HAWK	
NASAMS	Norway		
2K12 Kub	Soviet Union	Kvadrat	
Tor	Soviet Union	Tor-M	
CA-95	Romania	CA-95M	
Crotale	France	Crotale NG	
S-125 Neva/Pechora	Soviet Union; Ukraine; Poland	S-125-2D; S-125 Newa SC	
9K33 Osa	Soviet Union; Poland	Osa-AKM; Osa-AKM-P1 Żądło	
9K35 Strela-10	Soviet Union		
Stormer HVM	United Kingdom		
Gravehawk	United Kingdom		
M1097 Avenger	United States		
Self-propelled anti-aircraft weapons
2K22 Tunguska	Soviet Union		
ZSU-23-4 Shilka	Soviet Union		
Flakpanzer Gepard	Germany		
Skynex	Germany		
Excalibur Army MR-2 Viktor	Czech Republic		ZPU-2 mounted on a Toyota Hilux chassis.
Hibneryt	Poland		
Towed anti-aircraft guns
ZSU-23-2	Soviet Union		Some mounted on technicals.
AZP S-60	Soviet Union		
KS-19	Soviet Union		Used in the ground support role.
Bofors L/70	Sweden		
Zastava M55	Yugoslavia	Zastava M55; Zastava M75	
MSI-DS Terrahawk Paladin	United Kingdom		

== Radars ==
Radar for long and medium air defense are under Radiolocation Forces authority of the Ukrainian Air Force. See their equipment.

Model	Origin	Variant	Notes
Air radars
P-14	Soviet Union		
P-18	Soviet Union	P-18C; P-18ML; P-18 "Malakhit"	
P-19	Soviet Union		
P-35	Soviet Union		
1L22 "Parol"	Soviet Union		
PRV-11	Soviet Union		
PRV-13	Soviet Union		
R-410	Soviet Union		
36D6 "Tin Shield"	Soviet Union		Part of the S-300.
5N66M "Clam Shell"	Soviet Union		Used with the S-300.
5N63S "Flap Lid B"	Soviet Union		Used with the S-300.
SURN 1S91	Soviet Union		Used with the 2K12 Kub.
MR-18	Ukraine		
79K6 "Pelikan"	Ukraine		
80K6M	Ukraine		
AN/MPQ-50	United States		Used with the MIM-23 Hawk.
AN/MPQ-61	United States		Used with the MIM-23 Hawk.
AN/MPQ-62	United States		Used with the MIM-23 Hawk.
AN/MPQ-64 Sentinel	United States		Some used with the NASAMS.
TRML	Germany	TRML-4D	
X-TAR	Germany		Used with the Skynex.
Ground Master 200	France		
Thomson-CSF RAC 3D	France		Used with the Spada 2000.
Giraffe	Sweden	Giraffe 75	
Arabel	France; Italy		Used with the SAMP/T.
Ground radars
ARK-1	Soviet Union		
SNAR-10	Soviet Union		
PPRU-1	Soviet Union	9S80	
1AP1 "Polozhennya-2"	Ukraine		
Zoopark-3	Ukraine		
AN/TPQ-36	United States		
AN/TPQ-48	United States		
AN/TPQ-49	United States		
AN/MPQ-50	United States		
COBRA	France; United Kingdom; United States		
Thales SQUIRE	France		
ARTHUR	Norway; Sweden	ARTHUR; MAMBA	
Multirole radars
AN/TPQ-53	United States	MMR	
RADA ieMHR	Israel		

== Electronic warfare and communication ==
=== Command posts and communications stations ===
Model	Image	Origin	Type	Variant	Number	Details
BMP-1KSh		Soviet Union	Stand alone unit		1+	
9S470M1		Soviet Union; Ukraine	Command vehicle		N/A	Command vehicle for the BUK-M1.
R-149BMR Kushetka-B		Russia; Ukraine	Command and staff vehicle		1	1 vehicle captured and pressed into Ukrainian service. Modified with a BRM-1K turret.
Barnaul-T 9С932-1		Russia	Automated system for air defence units		1+	At least 1 captured vehicle was pressed into Ukrainian service.
LPG		Poland	Tracked command vehicle	WD WDSz	N/A	
M577		United States	Armoured command center		7+	Donated by Lithuania.
M7 Bradley		United States	Fire support vehicle		4	

=== Electronic warfare and jammers ===
Model	Image	Origin	Type	Variant	Number	Details
R-330		Soviet Union; Ukraine	Electronic warfare system	Mandat-B1E R-330UM	N/A	
NOTA		Ukraine	Counter unmanned aerial vehicle jammer		N/A	
Bukovel-AD		Ukraine	Counter unmanned aerial vehicle jammer		N/A	
Moruš		Czech Republic	Wheeled vehicle-mounted, multi-functional electronic warfare weapon system		1+	
EDM4S		Lithuania	Counter-unmanned aerial vehicle jammer		110	
Borisoglebsk-2		Russia	Tracked vehicle-mounted, multi-functional electronic warfare weapon system	R-330BMV; Borisoglebsk-2B:	1+	1 captured from Russian forces in 2022.

== Engineering ==
=== Recovery vehicles ===
Model	Image	Origin	Type	Number	Details
BTS-4		Soviet Union; Ukraine	Tracked armoured recovery vehicle	22+	Based on the T-54/T-55 chassis.
BREM-1		Soviet Union; Ukraine	Tracked armoured recovery vehicle	10	
BREM-2		Soviet Union; Ukraine	Tracked amphibious armoured recovery vehicle	1+	Modernized by the Zhytomyr Armoured Plant.
MT-T Aeneas		Soviet Union; Ukraine	Tracked recovery vehicle	Unknown	Based on the T-64 chassis. Seen in use during the Russian invasion of Ukraine.
BREM-Ch		Czechoslovakia	Tracked armoured recovery vehicle	1	At least 1 vehicle was captured from Russian forces and used by the Armed Forces of Ukraine.
VT-72B		Czechoslovakia	Tracked armoured recovery vehicle	1+	Supplied by the Czech Republic in 2014.
BREM-84 "Atlet"		Ukraine	Tracked armoured recovery vehicle	1	
BREM-4K		Ukraine	Wheeled amphibious armoured recovery vehicle	1+	
BREM-4RM		Ukraine	Wheeled amphibious armoured recovery vehicle	1+	At least one purchased in 2020.
Bergepanzer 2		West Germany	Tracked armoured recovery vehicle	15	
NM189 Ingeniørpanservogns		West Germany	Tracked armoured recovery vehicle	4	Pledged by Norway.
Bergepanzer 3		West Germany	Tracked armoured recovery vehicle	2	
M1089A1P2		United States	Wrecker	104	
M984A4 HEMTT recovery vehicle		United States	Wrecker	104	
M88		United States	Armored recovery vehicle	8	M88A1 and M88A2 Hercules donated by the United States.
GMC TopKick		United States		Unknown	
FV106 Samson		United Kingdom	Tracked light armoured recovery vehicle	5	Pledged to Ukraine by the British government in response to the Russian invasion of Ukraine.
CRARRV		United Kingdom	Tracked armoured recovery vehicle	2	Donated by the United Kingdom.
Bärgningsbandvagn 90		Sweden	Tracked armoured recovery vehicle	1+	
YPR-806		United StatesNetherlands	Tracked armoured recovery vehicle	5	5 to be donated by the Netherlands.

=== Clearing vehicles ===
Model	Image	Origin	Type	Number	Details
IMR-2		Soviet Union	Tracked armoured obstacle clearing vehicle	?	Inherited from the former Soviet Union, some were captured from Russian forces.
UR-77 Meteorit		Soviet Union	Tracked amphibious mine clearing vehicle	?	
M 58 MICLIC		United States	Rocket-projected explosive line charge	?	Provided by the United States as military aid in 2022.
Armtrac 400		United Kingdom	Mine clearing vehicle	?	
Wisent 1		Germany; United Kingdom	Mine clearing vehicle	16	26 to be delivered by Germany.
Leopard 2R		Finland; Germany	Mine clearing vehicle	6	Donated by Finland.
Bozena 4		Slovakia	Mine clearing vehicle	2	Pledged by Slovakia.
Bozena 5		Slovakia	Mine clearing vehicle	2	
DOK-ING MV-4		Croatia	Mine clearing vehicle	2	Donated by Ireland.
K600 CEV		Republic of Korea	Combat engineer vehicle	2	To be supplied by South Korea.
VAB Génie		France	Multipurpose clearance vehicle	?	To be supplied by France.
M1150 Assault Breacher Vehicle		United States	Combat engineer vehicle		

=== Minelayers ===
Model	Image	Origin	Type	Number	Details
GMZ-3		Soviet Union	Tracked minelayer	51+	At least two vehicles have been captured from Russian forces during the Russian invasion of Ukraine.
Shielder		United Kingdom	Tracked minelayer	Unknown	

=== Construction vehicles ===
Model	Image	Origin	Type	Number	Details
BAT-2		Soviet Union	Tracked armoured road laying machine	40	
MDK-3		Soviet Union	Tracked trencher	N/A	
PZM-3		Soviet Union	Tracked trencher	N/A	
MAZ-5335		Soviet Union	Wheeled crane	N/A	Seen building bunkers in the Donbas.
KrAZ-255B		Soviet Union	Wheeled excavator	N/A	
Dachs		West Germany	Armoured engineer vehicles	5	
FV434		United Kingdom	Armoured Repair Vehicle	N/A	
Morooka PC-065B		Japan	Tracked dump truck		Donated by Japan.

=== Bridges ===
Model	Image	Origin	Type	Number	Details
PMP		Soviet Union	Wheeled Amphibious bridge laying vehicle	?	
MT-55A		Czechoslovakia	Tracked armoured vehicle-launched bridge	?	
MTU-20		Soviet Union	Tracked armoured vehicle-launched bridge	?	
MTU-72		Soviet Union	Tracked armoured vehicle-launched bridge	1+	
TMM-3		Soviet Union	Wheeled motorized bridge	?	
M60 AVLB		United States	Armoured vehicle-launched bridge	18	Supplied by the United States.
Biber (Brückenlegepanzer)		West Germany	Armoured vehicle-launched bridge	14	14 out of 26 delivered by Germany as of January 2024.
M3 Amphibious Rig		Germany	Amphibious bridge laying vehicle	?	Pledged to be delivered by the Netherlands.
Pont flottant motorisé		France	Wheeled motorized bridge	?	Pledged by France.
EFA		France	Amphibious bridge laying vehicle	?	Pledged by France.

== Ships and underwater vehicles ==
Model	Image	Origin	Type	Number	Details
BMK-130		Soviet Union	Motorboat	N/A	
BMK-460		Soviet Union	Tugboat	N/A	
Zodiac Futura		France	Motorboat	30	Supplied by France.
Galaxy Trident 8		Ukraine	Motorboat	2+	Used by special forces.
Willard Sea Force 730		United States	Motorboat	10	Used by special forces.
Willard Sea Force 11M		United States	Motorboat	10	Used by special forces.
Metal Shark 7M RIB		United States	Motorboat	10	Provided by the United States as aid in 2021.
Wing P-series Boat		United States		70+	Provided by the United States as aid in 2021.
34-foot Dauntless Sea Ark		United States	Patrol boat	10	Provided by the United States in a June 2022 aid package. Seen in use in Ukraine in November 2022.
40-foot Defiant Patrol Boat		United States	Patrol boat	6	Provided by the United States in a June 2022 aid package. Seen in use in Ukraine in November 2022.
35-foot small-unit Riverine Craft		United States	Riverine patrol boat	2	Provided by the United States in a June 2022 aid package.
Armored Riverine Boat		United States	Riverine patrol boat	40	Provided by the United States in a November 2022 aid package.
MK VI Patrol Boat		United States	Patrol boat	8	
UMS 600				?	Seen in use during the Russian invasion of Ukraine.
Sherp the Shuttle		Ukraine	Landing boat	1+	Seen in use during the Russian invasion of Ukraine.
SeaFox Autonomous Mine-Detecting Underwater Vehicles		Germany	Autonomous mine-detecting underwater vehicles	2	Provided by the Netherlands in 2022.

== Medical ==
=== Tracked ambulances ===
Model	Image	Origin	Type	Variant	Number	Details
FV104 Samaritan		United Kingdom	Tracked armored ambulance	Combat Vehicle Reconnaissance (Tracked)	40	Supplied by the United Kingdom. Some were donated by private donors.
M113A4 armored medical evacuation vehicle		United States	Tracked armored ambulance		100	Sent by the United States.
M113A2		United States	Tracked armored ambulance		3	Donated by Portugal.
M577A2		United States	Tracked armored ambulance		2	Donated by Portugal.
Warthog		Singapore	Tracked armored ambulance	Warthog ambulance	10	
THeMIS		Estonia	Unmanned ground vehicle	MEDEVAC role	14	

=== Wheeled protected ambulances ===
Model	Image	Origin	Type	Variant	Number	Details
Steyr-Puch Pinzgauer		Austria; United Kingdom	Protected ambulance Protected mobility vehicle	718 ambulances	N/A	Former British Army stocks converted by the Venari Group. Some were donated by Luxembourg.
RG-31 Nyala		South Africa; Spain	Light protected multi-purpose vehicle	Ambulance	1+ (?)	At least one donated by Spain.
Terradyne Gurkha		Canada	Light protected multi-purpose vehicle		13	
Alvis Tactica		United Kingdom	Light protected multi-purpose vehicle	Ambulance	1+	Seen in use during the Russian invasion of Ukraine. Likely was bought by volunteers.

=== Wheeled ambulances ===
Model	Image	Origin	Type	Variant	Number	Details
UAZ-3962		Russia	Ambulance			Being replaced with the Bogdan-2251.
Bogdan-2251		China; Ukraine	Ambulance	Great Wall Wingle 5	350	
Unimog Ambulance		Germany; United Kingdom	Ambulance	Unimog ambulance	47+	Former British army stock, converted by the Venari Group.
HMMWV Ambulance		United States	Ambulance		40+	Donated by a private donor.

== Logistics ==
=== Utility vehicles ===
Model	Image	Origin	Type	Variant	Number	Details
UAZ-452		Soviet Union	Van	UAZ-452; UAZ-452A	?	
UAZ-469		Soviet Union	Military light utility vehicle		?	To be replaced starting in 2021.
KTM 450 EXC		Austria	Off-road motorcycle		1+	Used to transport troops and light weapons in rough terrain.
Bogdan-2351		Ukraine	Multi-purpose vehicle	Great Wall Wingle 5	350+	Adopted in 2018, it is derived from the Chinese Great Wall Wingle 5.
Lada 4x4 pickup		Russia	Pickup truck		12	Donated by Riga Forests Ltd.
Fiat Fullback		Italy	Pickup truck		51	Seen equipped with Mistral surface-to-air missile launchers.
Volkswagen Amarok		Germany	Pickup truck		30+	30 armoured versions donated by Germany.
Caracal		Germany	Light utility vehicle		5	To be provided by Germany.
Isuzu D-Max		Japan	Pickup truck		?	Used as technicals.
Mitsubishi L200		Japan	Pickup truck		?	Used as technicals.
Nissan Navara		Japan	Pickup truck		50	Pickups equipped with 12.7-mm DShK heavy machine gun and Mk19 grenade launchers.
Tencore Terrain Modular Infantry Transporter (TerMIT)		Ukraine	Tracked unmanned ground vehicle	TerMIT 2.0	1000s	300 kg payload capacity, for rough terrain, slopes, obstacles, and trenches. Developed by Ukrainian company Tencore. Co-manufactured with Germany's FERNRIDE.
Toyota Land Cruiser J76		Japan	Wagon	J76	43	Provided by the United States in 2017.
Toyota Land Cruiser		Japan	Multi-purpose vehicle	70 series	43+	Used by special forces.
Toyota Mega Cruiser		Japan	Multi-purpose vehicle		100	
LV-Teh		Latvia	All-terrain vehicle		80	Civilian all-terrain vehicles repurposed for the military.
Tarpan Honker		Poland	Multi-purpose vehicle			Former Polish Army vehicles, donated by private donors in 2014.
Santana Aníbal		Spain	Multi-purpose vehicle		4+	Donated by Spain.
Ford Ranger		United States	Pickup truck		?	Seen equipped with armoured plates for extra protection.
Ford Raptor		United States	Pickup truck		Unknown	Seen modified into multiple launch rocket system.
Jeep Wrangler		United States	Multi-purpose vehicle		7	Donated by Luxembourg in response to Russian invasion of Ukraine.
Land Rover Defender		United Kingdom	Multi-purpose vehicle		55	
Peugeot P4		France	Multi-purpose vehicle		?	Delivered by France.
PTS-2		Soviet Union	Tracked Amphibious vehicle		~15	
M548		United States	Tracked Cargo vehicle		51+	Donated by Norway.
Mitsubishi Type 73 light truck		Japan	Light utility vehicle	Type 73 Kogata		Donated by Japan.
Mosphera e-scooter		Latvia	e-scooter		70	

=== Cargo vehicles ===
==== Tractor units ====
Model	Image	Origin	Type	Variant	Number	Details
MAZ-537		Soviet Union	(Pull 50 tonnes)		N/A	
KrAZ-6446		Ukraine	(Pull 30 tonnes)		N/A	
KrAZ-6510TE		Ukraine	(Pull 70 tonnes)	KrAZ-6510TE	3	Order placed in 2019. Three were delivered in 2022.
M1070 HET		United States			15	13 donated from Germany. 2 were bought by a charity organization and donated to the 43rd artillery brigade.
HX81 Heavy Equipment and Tank Transporters		Austria; Germany		Heavy Equipment and Tank Transporters	90	Supplied by Germany.

==== Trucks ====
Model	Image	Origin	Type	Variant	Number	Details
Ural-4320		Soviet Union	Medium			
ZIL-131		Soviet Union	Medium			
GAZ-66		Soviet Union	Medium (2 tonnes)		~2,000 (2014)	
KamAZ-5320		Soviet Union	Heavy (8 tonnes)			
KamAZ-4310		Soviet Union	Heavy (6 tonnes)			
KamAZ-43114		Russia	Heavy (6 tonnes)			Purchased prior to the Russo-Ukrainian War.
KrAZ-257		Soviet Union	Heavy (12 tonnes)			
KrAZ-255		Soviet Union	Heavy (12 tonnes)	KrAZ-255B		
KrAZ-260		Soviet Union	Heavy	KrAZ-260; ATs-10-260		
KrAZ-6322		Ukraine	Heavy		87+	
KrAZ-6510		Ukraine	Heavy	Dump truck	16+	
KrAZ-5233		Ukraine	Heavy (6 tonnes)	KrAZ-5233VE; KrAZ-5233NE		
MAZ-4371		Belarus	Medium	MAZ-4371N2		Used by the Armed Forces of Ukraine and National Guard.
MAZ-5316		Belarus; Ukraine	Heavy (7.5 tonnes)	Bogdan-5316	32	Assembled locally.
MAZ-6317		Belarus; Ukraine	Heavy (11 tonnes)	Bogdan-6317	320	Assembled locally, with Chinese engines.
Tatra T815		Czech Republic	Heavy	Т815-7Т3RC1		Used on various Ukrainian weapon systems.
GAZ-53		Soviet Union	Medium			Seen in use during the Russian invasion of Ukraine.
GAZ-63		Soviet Union	Medium			Seen in use during the Russian invasion of Ukraine.
GAZ-3308		Soviet Union	Medium (2.5 tonnes)			Seen in use during the Russian invasion of Ukraine.
KrAZ-214		Soviet Union	Heavy			Seen in use during the Russian invasion of Ukraine.
ZIL-130		Soviet Union	Medium			Seen in use during the Russian invasion of Ukraine.
ZIL-157		Soviet Union	Medium			Seen in use during the Russian invasion of Ukraine.
ZiL-4331		Soviet Union	Medium			Seen in use during the Russian invasion of Ukraine.
MAZ-500		Soviet Union	Heavy	MAZ-AC-8-500A; MAZ-TZ-500		Seen in use during the Russian invasion of Ukraine.
MAZ-5337		Soviet Union	Heavy	Tanker truck		Seen in use during the Russian invasion of Ukraine.
Ural-63704-0010 Tornado-U		Russia	Heavy (16 tonnes)		6	Captured from Russian forces. At least 2 put into Ukrainian service.
Saurer 2DM		Switzerland	Medium (4.9 tonnes)	(4x4)	1	Seen during the 2022 Kharkiv counteroffensive.
MAN KAT1		West Germany	Heavy (7 tonnes)	6x6 8x8	6+	Used for towing FH70 howitzers.
MAN HX		Germany	15 tonnes	8x8	90	
Unimog		Germany	Medium (2.5 tonnes)		4+	All 4 machines are used as medevac and were bought by volunteers for the Army in late 2014. Unknown number of Unimogs delivered by Germany in February 2023.
MAN TG		Germany	Medium (2.5 tonnes)	4x4	13	Donated by the European Union.
LKW 15t mil gl MULTI		Germany	15 tonnes		34	Supplied by Germany.
Zetros		Germany			250	
Iveco Trakker		Italy	Heavy (9 tonnes)		20+	First Ivecos bought for engineering purposes with United States aid money. Iveco dump trucks and aircraft refuelling trucks donated by Germany in February 2023.
Iveco ACM 90		Italy	Medium (4 tonnes)	4x4		Donated by Italy. Some units of Iveco ACL 90 delivered by Germany for the use as Border Protection Vehicles.
Iveco Astra SM 66.40		Italy		6x6	unknown	Used for towing FH-70 155 mm howitzers.
MTV		United States	Medium		600+	Used for towing and hauling equipment.
Renault GBC 180		France	Medium (5 tonnes)	6x6	6	Delivered by France.
Renault TRM 2000		France	Medium (2 tonnes)	4x4	Unknown	Delivered by France in August and September 2022. Further units delivered by Germany for use as Border Protection Vehicles.
Renault TRM 10000		France	10 tonnes truck	6x6	Unknown	Seen towing TRF1 155 mm howitzers and ammunition.
Renault Trucks D		France	Medium		90	Off-road vehicles donated by the EU, are primarily used for humanitarian purposes in the Russian invasion of Ukraine.
Ashok Leyland Stallion		India			1	Bought commercially by Petro Poroshenko, together with 10 DAF Leyland T244 trucks, Nissan Pathfinder, UAVs. Ukrainian military received this donation in October 2022.
Leyland DAF		United Kingdom	Medium (4 tonnes)		10	10 military Leyland DAFs have been bought from old stocks of the British Army by the Fund of Ukrainian ex-president Poroshenko, and handed over to the Armed Forces of Ukraine.
Foden 8x6 Carrier		United Kingdom			20	Ukrainian volunteers, with the support of the Petro Poroshenko Foundation, bought 20 Foden 8x6 Carrier trucks for the Armed Forces of Ukraine, capable of transporting cargo weighing up to 18 tons.
DAF YA-4442		Netherlands	4 tonnes truck		~300	Delivered by the Netherlands in November 2022.
DAF YAZ-2300		Netherlands	10 tonnes truck		Unknown	Delivered by the Netherlands in November 2022.
DAF YA-328		Netherlands			1	One donated for use by Ukrainian Forces.
Volvo Fassi N10		Sweden			150	90 pledged by Belgium.
Scania P92		Sweden			Unknown	Scania P92 Trucks With Crane donated by Norway.
Scania P113		Sweden			Unknown	Scania P113 Trucks With Hook Lift donated by Norway.
Star 266		Poland	Medium	Star 266; Star 266M2	2+	Donated by Poland.
Jelcz P882 D53		Poland	Medium		1+	Delivered by Poland.

==== Ammunition carriers ====
Model	Image	Origin	Type	Variant	Number	Details
9T452		Soviet Union	Wheeled	9T452		Ammo carrier for the BM-27 Uragan multiple rocket launcher.
9T217 Transloader		Soviet Union	Wheeled			For 9K33 Osa.
TZM-T		Russia	Tracked		5+ (?)	Reloader for the TOS-1. By 14 April 2022, four vehicles had been captured from Russian forces.
M992 field artillery ammunition supply vehicle		United States	Tracked		30	Delivered by United States along the 18 M109s.

== Aircraft ==
Model	Image	Origin	Type	Variant	Number	Details
General Dynamics F-16 Fighting Falcon		United States	Multirole fighter	F-16AM /BM	?/+61	Up to 61 to be transferred by Denmark, and the Netherlands.
Dassault Mirage 2000		France	Multirole fighter	2000-5	Unknown	Unspecified number to be transferred by France.
Mikoyan MiG-29		Soviet Union	Multirole fighter	MiG-29S MiG-29G MiG-29AS MiG-29MU1 MiG-29MU2	55	8 are used for conversion training.
Sukhoi Su-24		Soviet Union	Interdictor	Su-24M		Modified to fire Storm Shadow missiles.
Sukhoi Su-25		Soviet Union	Close air support / Attack aircraft	Su-25M	20	4 are used for conversion training.
Sukhoi Su-27		Soviet Union	Air superiority fighter	Su-27S Su-27P Su-27UB Su-27PU	31	6 are used for conversion training.

=== Airborne early warning and control ===
Model	Image	Origin	Type	Variant	Number	Details
Saab 340		Sweden	AWACS	S100B	2	2 pledged by Sweden.

=== Reconnaissance ===
Model	Image	Origin	Type	Variant	Number	Details
Antonov An-30		Soviet Union	Reconnaissance aircraft	An-30B	3	

=== Transport ===
Model	Image	Origin	Type	Variant	Number	Details
Antonov An-26		Soviet Union	Transport	An-26B-100 An-26 Vita	24	
Antonov An-70		Ukraine	Transport		1	
Antonov An-72		Soviet Union	Transport	An-72B	2	Used by the National Guard.
Antonov An-178		Ukraine	Transport			3 on order.
Ilyushin Il-76		Soviet Union	Airlift aircraft	Il-76MD	4	

=== Trainer aircraft ===
Model	Image	Origin	Type	Variant	Number	Details
Aero L-39 Albatros		Czechoslovakia	Jet trainer	An-30B	44	

=== Helicopters ===
Model	Image	Origin	Type	Variant	Number	Details
Airbus Helicopters H125		France	Utility		2	Used by the National Guard.
Airbus H225		Germany; France; Europe	Utility	H225M		Used by the National Guard.
Aérospatiale SA 330 Puma		France	Utility	SA-330S HC mk2	8 8-10	Donated by Portugal in the end of 2024 as military aid. 8-10 reportedly to be delivered by the United Kingdom.
Kamov Ka-226		Russia	Utility		1	Used by the Ukrainian Navy.
Kamov Ka-27		Soviet Union	Utility			Used by the Ukrainian Navy.
MBB Bo 105		West Germany	Utility	Bo 150 Bo 150E4	2	1 demilitarised unit donated by Oleksandr Hromyko in 2022. In 2023 the Ministry of Defense adopted the Bo 150E4 into service.
Mil Mi-2		Soviet Union	Utility	Mi-2MSB	11	Predominately used for training.
Mil Mi-8		Soviet Union; Russia	Transport/armed	Mi-8 Mi-8MSB-V Mi-8AMTSh	15 1	One Mi-8ATMSh was handed over to the UAF by a Russian defector in 2023.
Mil Mi-14		Soviet Union; Russia	Search and rescue / Anti-submarine warfare		2	Used by the Ukrainian Navy.
Mil Mi-17		Soviet Union; Russia	Transport / Armed	Mi-17 Mi-17V-5	22	Donated by several countries. 2 Mi-171E pledged by Argentina in 2023.
Mil Mi-24		Soviet Union; Russia	Attack	Mi-24VP Mi-24V Mi-24P Mi-24K Mi-24RKhR Mi-24PU-1 Mi-35	45	
Westland Sea King		United Kingdom	Search and rescue	Sea King HU5 Sea King Mk41	3	Used by the Ukrainian Navy. 6 pledged by Germany.

=== Air armaments ===
Model	Image	Origin	Type	Variant	Details
	Air-to-air missiles				
R-73		Soviet Union	Short-range	R-73E	
R-60		Soviet Union	Short-range	R-60MK	
R-27		Soviet Union	Medium-range	R-27ET R-27ER R-27R1	
Sungur IIR-guided MANPADS		Turkey	Short-range		For Bayraktar TB2.
AIM-7 Sparrow		United States	Medium range		Used on surface-to-air missile systems.
AIM-9 Sidewinder		United States	Short range	9M 9L 9X	Used on NASAMS systems. Used on F-16.
AIM-120 AMRAAM		United States	Medium range	AIM-120A AIM-120B AIM-120C	Used on NASAMS systems. Used on F-16.
AIM-132 ASRAAM		United Kingdom	Short range		Used on surface-to-air missile systems.
	Anti-radiation missile				
AGM-88 HARM		United States	Anti-radiation missile		
	Air-to-surface missile				
Barrier-V		Ukraine	Anti-tank guided missile		Mounted on Mi-8MSB-V helicopters.
Kh-29		Soviet Union			
Kh-25		Soviet Union		Kh-25MP	
	Cruise missile				
Storm Shadow		France; United Kingdom		Storm Shadow SCALP-EG	Used on Su-24 bombers.
	Guided bombs				
KAB-1500L		Soviet Union			
KAB-500KR		Soviet Union			
MAM-L		Turkey			For Bayraktar TB2.
MAM-C		Turkey			For Bayraktar TB2.
GBU-39 Small Diameter Bomb		United States			
Joint Direct Attack Munition		United States		JDAM-ER	
Armement Air-Sol Modulaire		France			Used on MiG-29s.
Paveway IV		United Kingdom			To be supplied by the United Kingdom.
Equalizer (or Leveler)		Ukraine	short range at lower altitudes and medium range at higher altitudes		a precision-guided munition and glide bomb intended to be produced domestically and cheaper than the likes of Joint Direct Attack Munition kits.
	Unguided bombs				
OFAB-100-120		Soviet Union			
OFAB 250–270		Soviet Union			High explosive fragmentation.
FAB-250		Soviet Union			
FAB-500		Soviet Union		OFAB-500ShR	Parachute retarded fragmentation bomb.
	Unguided rocket				
Hydra 70		United States	70mm		More than 20,000 supplied by the United States.
Zuni		United States	127 mm		More than 6,000 delivered by the United States.
S-5		Soviet Union	57 mm		Also used in a ground-ground multiple rocket launcher role.
S-8		Soviet Union	80 mm		
S-13		Soviet Union	122 mm	B-13L	
S-24		Soviet Union	240 mm	S-24B	
S-25		Soviet Union	266 mm	S-25OF S-25OFM	
Illumination bombs
SAB-250-200		Soviet Union			
Decoy armaments
ADM-160 MALD		United States			
Electronic Countermeasure pods
AN/ALQ-131		United States	Pod-mounted active Electronic countermeasure system		

=== Army aviation ===
The Ukrainian Army Aviation operates overhauled and modernized Soviet Mil Mi-2, Mi-8, and Mi-24 helicopters. Following the Russian invasion in 2022, the United States, Czech Republic, Poland, Latvia, Lithuania, and Croatia donated Mi-8s and Mi-24/35s to help Ukraine replenish its losses.

=== Air force ===
The Ukrainian Air Force consists largely of aging Soviet-era aircraft inherited from the Soviet Union. In late July 2024, the UAF reportedly received the first batch of American-made F-16s. Other Western aircraft expected to enter Ukrainian service includes Mirage 2000 fighter jets, and two Saab 340 airborne early warning and control aircraft.

=== Naval aviation ===
The Ukrainian Naval Aviation operates Kamov helicopters, Mil Mi-14 and Westland Sea King helicopters, the latter donated by the United Kingdom in 2022. In 2021, Rear Admiral Oleksiy Neizhpapa told UNIAN that the Ukrainian Navy was in the process of replacing its Kamov helicopters (whose spare parts are only produced in Russia) with domestically produced or foreign models.

=== Unmanned aerial vehicles and autonomous vehicles ===
In July 2024, the Ukrainian Ministry of Defense in a press release stated that more than 70 Ukrainian-made UAVs were adopted into AFU service. It was also stated that in 2023 around 60 different models of UAVs were officially adopted by the AFU.

Name	Country of origin	Type	Notes
Reconnaissance
A1-CM Furia	Ukraine		
Leleka-100	Ukraine		In service since May 2021.
Backfire	Ukraine		
Mara	Ukraine		
PD-2	Ukraine		
UJ-22	Ukraine		Also used as a loitering munition.
Shark	Ukraine		
Primoco UAV One 150	Czech Republic		
Black Hornet Nano	Norway	Micro drone	
DJI Mavic	China	Civilian drone	15 km (9.3 mi) range.
Unmanned combat aerial vehicle
Bayraktar TB2	Turkey		Used by the Air Force and Navy.
Loitering munitions
Morok	Ukraine		300 km (190 mi) range.
UJ-25 Skyline	Ukraine		800 km (500 mi) range.
Bober	Ukraine		1,000 km (620 mi) range.
Palianytsia	Ukraine		"missile-drone", first used August 2024.
Sting	Ukraine	drone-interceptor	First kill May 2025.
Improvised loitering munitions
Tupolev Tu-141	Soviet Union		
Tupolev Tu-143	Soviet Union		
FPV drones	Ukraine		Civilian drones, range 5–25 km (3.1–15.5 mi).
Cargo drones
Malloy Aeronautics T150	United Kingdom		
Sypaq Corvo	Australia	Disposable	Used as loitering munition.
Munition dropping drones
Baba Yaga	Ukraine	Hexacopter	Some are used as drone motherships.
Punisher	Ukraine	Multirole	

== Uniforms ==
=== Camouflages ===
Name	Photo	Origin	Notes
MM-14		Ukraine	Standard issue camouflage, adopted in 2016. The MM14 is a pixelated camouflage, inspired by NATO-style patterns, and was adopted as part of the broader modernization, Ukrainization, and decommunization process of the military.
Varan ZSU		Ukraine	The differential characteristic of "Varan" camouflage is its drawing which uses elements of three-dimensional net structure. This structure combined with the background gives a unique "effect of solubility".
DPM		United Kingdom	British-surplus uniforms seen in use during the Rapid Trident 2015 exercise.
MTP		United Kingdom	Mainly volunteers seen wearing MTP uniforms supplied by donations of British surplus. Also donated to Ukraine by the United Kingdom.
M81 Woodland		United States	Known to be used by the Bohdan Company and Chernihiv Company. A local variant is made to resemble Croatian-made Woodland camos.
MARPAT		United States	Used by regular Ukrainian Armed Forces.
MultiCam		United States	Standard issue camouflage for special forces. Widely issued to regular troops and volunteers.
OCP		United States	Used by regular Ukrainian Armed forces and reservists. Supplied by the United States Armed Forces from 2022 onwards.
UCP		United States	Used by regular Ukrainian Armed Forces (slightly different color palette), and some special units.
Type II brown-dominant winter pattern		Japan	Donated by Japan in response to the Russian invasion of Ukraine.
Camouflage Central-Europe		France	Donated by France in response to the Russian invasion of Ukraine.

=== Armor ===
Name	Photo	Origin	Notes
SSh-68		Soviet Union	Used during the War in Donbas.
Kaska-1M		Ukraine	One of the standard helmets, in widespread use. Produced domestically by TEMP3000.
TOR, TOR-D, TOR-BT		Ukraine	One of the standard helmets, in widespread use. Produced domestically by UaRms.
Gefechtshelm M92		Germany	23,000 were donated by Germany to Ukraine in response to the Russian invasion of Ukraine. Belgium donated an unknown number.
Combat Bullet-Proof Vest		Japan	Provided by Japan in response to the Russian invasion of Ukraine. Mainly used by Territorial Defense Forces.
Type 3 Bulletproof vest		Japan	Japanese Bulletproof Vest Type 3, provided by Japan in response to the Russian invasion of Ukraine. Mainly used by Territorial Defense Forces.
Type 88 helmet		Japan	Donated by Japan.
Hełm wz. 2005		Poland	42,000 were donated to Ukraine by Poland in response to the Russian invasion of Ukraine.
Hjälm 90		Sweden	5,000 were donated by Sweden to Ukraine in response to the Russian invasion of Ukraine.
Kroppsskydd 12 Combat Vest		Sweden	5054 were donated by Sweden to Ukraine in response to the Russian invasion of Ukraine.
Mk 6 helmet		United Kingdom	Some were supplied in 2014. Further helmet donations were made in response to the Russian invasion of Ukraine.
Mk 7 helmet		United Kingdom	Thousands were donated to Ukraine by the United Kingdom in response to the Russian invasion of Ukraine.
Personnel Armor System for Ground Troops		United States	Used by the Aidar and Donbas Battalions.
FAST helmet		United States	Used by Ukrainian Spetsnaz forces.
Strong Helmet		United States; Netherlands	Dutch-made version of the Modular Integrated Communications Helmet donated by he Netherlands.
Hjelm Helmet		Norway	5,000 helmets donated by Norway in response to the Russian invasion of Ukraine.
CG634 Helmet		Canada	Donated by Canada in response to the Russian invasion of Ukraine.
Gevechtshelm Composiet M95 Helmets		Netherlands; Spain	3,000 donated by the Netherlands in response to the Russian invasion of Ukraine.

=== Hazmat equipment ===
Name	Photo	Origin	Notes
Type 18 Hazmat Suit		Japan	Donated by Japan in response to the Russian invasion of Ukraine.
AlphaTec Chemical Protective Suits		Sweden	Donated by Sweden in response to the Russian invasion of Ukraine.
Avon Protection C-50 Gas Mask		United KingdomUnited States	Donated by Luxembourg in response to the Russian invasion of Ukraine.
Mobile decontamination vehicles HEP 70 including decontamination material		Germany	Donated by Germany.
ARS-14 decontamination and degassing vehicle		Soviet Union	

=== Night vision ===
Name	Photo	Origin	Notes
PVS-14		United States	Given by the United States in 2018. More donated by Luxembourg in response to the Russian invasion of Ukraine.
PVS-31		United States	Donated by the United States.
Thales OB70 Lucie		France	Donated by France.

== See also ==
- List of equipment of the National Guard of Ukraine
- List of armoured fighting vehicles of Ukraine
- Northrop Grumman M-ACE

Current War:

- List of military aid to Ukraine during the Russo-Ukrainian War
- List of Russo-Ukrainian War military equipment

== Bibliography ==
- Bilenko, О. І.; Pashchenko, V. V. (2010). "Підвищення стабільності дульної швидкості поражаючих елементів кінетичної зброї несмертельної дії" [Increasing the stability of muzzle velocity of striking elements of the kinetic non-lethal weapons]. Збірник наукових праць Національної академії Національної гвардії України (in Ukrainian). 2 (16). National Academy of the National Guard of Ukraine: 5–10. doi:10.33405/2409-7470/2010/2/16/150687 (inactive 12 July 2025). ISSN 2409-7470.
- Bilenko, O. I.; Kyrychenko, O. O. (2018). "Методика визначення раціональних балістичних характеристик зразка стрілецької зброї сил безпеки для підвищення безпечності її застосування" [Methodology for determining the rational ballistic characteristics of a small arms model of the security forces to increase the safety of its use]. Збірник наукових праць Національної академії Національної гвардії України (in Ukrainian). 2 (32). National Academy of the National Guard of Ukraine: 17–27. doi:10.33405/2409-7470/2018/2/32/155168. ISSN 2409-7470.
- Bilenko, Oleksandr; Kaidalov, Ruslan; Pershyna, Kateryna (27 August 2022). "Обґрунтування вимог до спускових пристроїв короткоствольної зброї" [Substantiation of requirements for trigger mechanisms of short-barreled weapons]. Збірник наукових праць Національної академії Національної гвардії України (in Ukrainian). 1 (39). National Academy of the National Guard of Ukraine: 5–12. doi:10.33405/2409-7470/2022/1/39/263358. ISSN 2409-7470.
- Ferguson, Jonathan; Jenzen-Jones, N.R. (2014). Raising Red Flags: An Examination of Arms & Munitions in the Ongoing Conflict in Ukraine, 2014 (PDF) (Report). Australia: Armament Research Services (ARES). ISBN 978-0-9924624-3-7. Archived from the original (PDF) on 4 April 2023.
- Galeotti, Mark (2019). Armies of Russia's War in Ukraine. Bloomsbury USA. ISBN 978-1-4728-3344-0.
- Hoyle, Craig (2023). World Air Forces 2024. FlightGlobal (Report). London: Flight Global Insight.
- International Institute for Strategic Studies (2022). The Military Balance 2022 (Report). Abingdon, Oxon. pp. 212–214. ISBN 978-1032279008.
- International Institute for Strategic Studies (2023). The Military Balance 2023 (Report) (1st ed.). Routledge. pp. 201−204. ISBN 978-1032508955.
- International Institute for Strategic Studies (2024). "Russia and Eurasia". The Military Balance 2024. 124. Taylor & Francis: 210−215. doi:10.1080/04597222.2024.2298592. ISSN 0459-7222.
- Jones, Richard D.; Ness, Leland S., eds. (2010). Jane's Infantry Weapons 2010-2011. Jane's Information Group. ISBN 978-0-7106-2908-1.
- McNab, Chris (2023). The SVD Dragunov Rifle. Bloomsbury Publishing. ISBN 978-1-4728-5599-2.
- Plokšto, Artur; Demeško, Andriej (2017). "Armaments used in the Ukrainian conflict 2014–2015". Security and Defence Quarterly. 15 (2): 54–84. doi:10.35467/sdq/103190.
- Thompson, Leroy (2022). Soviet Pistols: Tokarev, Makarov, Stechkin and others. Bloomsbury Publishing. ISBN 978-1-4728-5349-3.
- U.S. Department of Defense (2023). Fact Sheet on U.S. Security Assistance to Ukraine (PDF) (Report).
