= List of equipment of the National Guard of Ukraine =

The National Guard of Ukraine went through three stages in its evolution into the entity we see today. This is reflected in the type of weaponry used: from that of a standing army inherited from the first National Guard (1991–2000), to SWAT type weapons during its role as an internal police (2000–2014), to back to a military force that is armed lighter than the army but also can respond faster.

== Weapons ==
Model	Image	Origin	Caliber	Details
Handguns
TT-33		Soviet Union	7.62×25mm Tokarev	Taken from surplus Soviet stocks.
Fort-12		Ukraine	9×18mm Makarov	Standard handgun of the Omega Group.
Stechkin APS		Soviet Union	9×18mm Makarov	Used by special forces.
Makarov PM		Soviet Union	9×18mm Makarov	Standard issue handgun of the Ministry of Internal Affairs
Heckler & Koch USP		Germany	9×19mm Parabellum	Used by the Alpha Group.
Heckler & Koch SFP9		Germany	9×19mm Parabellum	Donated by Germany in response to the 2022 Russian invasion of Ukraine.
Glock 17		Austria	9×19mm Parabellum	Used by special forces.
Submachine gun
Brügger & Thomet MP9		Switzerland	9×19mm Parabellum	Used in small number by special forces.
FN P90		Belgium	FN 5.7×28mm	Used in small number by special forces.
Carbines
AKS-74U		USSR	5.45×39mm	Standard issue carbine.
AKMS		USSR	7.62×39mm	Limited usage in the Russo-Ukrainian War.
Assault rifles
Fort-221		Israel; Ukraine	5.45×39mm	License-produced version of the Israeli TAR-21 rifle.
AK-74		USSR	5.45×39mm	Standard assault rifle.
AK-12		Russia	5.45×39mm	Captured from Russian forces.
UAR-15		Ukraine	5.56×45mm NATO	Manufactured in Ukraine with some US-made components. Replacing the Kalashnikov style rifles in service with the National Guard.
M4A1		United States	5.56×45mm NATO	Used by special forces.
Shotguns
Saiga-12		Russia	12 gauge	Used by special forces.
Fort-500		Ukraine	12 gauge	Was used by the former Berkut riot police to fire armor-piercing slugs at Maidan protestors.
Bolt-action rifles
Mosin-Nagant M91/30		Russian Empire; Soviet Union	7.62×54mmR	Selected security detachments units of the Ministry of Internal Affairs.
Sniper rifles
Dragunov SVD		Soviet Union	7.62×54mmR	Standard sniper rifle.
UAR-10		Ukraine	7.62×51mm NATO	Replacing the Dragunov as the main sniper rifle of the National Guard.
VPR-308		Ukraine	7.62×51mm NATO	This is a modified version of the "Zbroyar" Z-008, first entered service with the National Guard in July, 2014. VPR-308Win — using 7.62×51mm NATO cartridges. First rifle was delivered January 2014; VPR-338LM — using .338 Lapua.
Brügger & Thomet APR		SwitzerlandUkraine	7.62×51mm NATO	Made under license by Tactical Systems as the TS.M.308/338.
Fort-301		Israel; Ukraine	7.62×51mm NATO	
Sako TRG-22		Finland	7.62×51mm NATO	The TRG-22 sniper rifle is used by the Alpha Group and the "Omega" special forces units of the National Guard.
Blaser R93 Tactical 2		Germany	7.62×51mm NATO	Used by the Alpha group.
SIG Sauer SSG 3000		Germany	7.62×51mm NATO	Used by Alpha Group and Guard Special Forces.
Desert Tech SRS		United States	7.62×51mm NATO	Introduced by the National Guard in 2016.
Cadex Defense CDX-33		Canada	.338 Lapua Magnum	
Barrett MRAD		United States	.338 Lapua Magnum	
Desert Tech HTI		United States	.50 BMG	Introduced by the National Guard in 2020.
SAN 511		Switzerland	.50 BMG	Anti-materiel rifle, used by special forces.
Machine gun
RPK-74		Soviet Union	5.45×39mm	Standard light machine gun.
PKM		Soviet Union	7.62×54mmR	Standard medium machine gun.
Fort-401		Ukraine; Israel	5.56×45mm	Ukrainian-produced IMI Negev machine gun.
Grenade launcher
M320		Germany; United States	40×46mmSR	Used by special forces.
RGP-40		Poland	40×46mmSR	Used by special forces.
UAG-40		Ukraine	40mm	500 units were bought for the Ukrainian military in 2016.
Anti-tank warfare
Barrier		Ukraine		Vehicle mounted anti-tank missile designed to replace 9K11 Malyutka, this weapon is attached to BTR-3s, BTR-4s, and BMP-2. Effective range 5,000 meters.
RPG-7		Soviet Union	40mm	Widely available weapon. RPG-7V model used.
PSRL-1		United States	40mm	American copy of the RPG-7.
M72 LAW		United States	66mm	Used by special forces.
RPG-18		Soviet Union	64mm	Used in the Russo-Ukrainian War.
RPG-22		Soviet Union	72.5mm	Used in the Russo-Ukrainian War.
RPG-26		Soviet Union	72.5mm	Used in the Russo-Ukrainian War.
RPG-32		Russia	72mm 105mm	Captured from Russian forces.
Bulspike-AT		Bulgaria	72.5mm	Bulgarian version of the RPG-22. Used by special forces.
M141 Bunker Defeat Munition		United States	83mm	Used by special forces.
SPG-9		Soviet Union	73mm	Used by the National Guard. After the 2022 Russian invasion of Ukraine, Bulgarian-made launchers are also used.
AT4		Sweden	84mm	Used by special forces.
Stugna-P		Ukraine	130mm 152mm	Used by the National Guard. Effective range 5,000 to 5,500 meters, depending on the warhead used.
9K111 Fagot		USSR	120mm	Effective range 2,000 meters.
9M113 Konkurs		USSR	135mm	Effective range 4,000 meters.
NLAW		Sweden; United Kingdom	150mm	Donated by the United Kingdom. Effective range 600 meters, while the new versions have an effective range of 800 meters.
Flamethrower
RPO-A Shmel		Soviet Union	93mm	Captured from Russian forces.

== Vehicles ==
=== Tanks ===
Model	Image	Origin	Type	Variant	Number	Details
T-64		USSR; Ukraine	Main battle tank	T-64BM; T-64BV	?	Prior to the 2022 Russian invasion of Ukraine, the National Guard had an unknown number of T-64BVs and T-64BMs.
T-72		Soviet Union	Main battle tank	T-72A T-72B1	?	Prior to the 2022 Russian invasion of Ukraine, the National Guard had an unknown number of T-72s.

=== Infantry fighting vehicle ===
Model	Image	Origin	Type	Variant	Number	Details
BMP-2		Soviet Union			1	Number prior to the 2022 Russian invasion.
BTR-3		Ukraine		BTR-3E1	32+	Number prior to the 2022 Russian invasion.
BTR-4		Ukraine		BTR-4E	60+	Number prior to the 2022 Russian invasion.
BMD-2		Soviet Union	Airborne IFV		1+	Captured from Russian forces.

=== Armoured personnel carrier ===
Model	Image	Origin	Type	Variant	Number	Details
BTR-70		Soviet Union	Armoured personnel carrier		?	
BTR-80		Soviet Union; Ukraine	Armoured personnel carrier	BTR-80; BTR-80M	?	
Kozak-2		Ukraine	MRAP		22	Prior to the Russian invasion in 2022, the National Guard had 22 Kozaks in active service.
KrAZ Shrek		Ukraine	MRAP	Shrek 1	?	Adopted by the National Guard in 2015.
KrAZ Spartan		Ukraine	Infantry mobility vehicle		40	Built at KrAZ factory in Kremenchuk, Ukraine under license from the Streit Group.
KrAZ Cougar		Ukraine	Infantry mobility vehicle		?	Adopted by the National Guard in 2014.
Saxon		United Kingdom	Infantry mobility vehicle		70	Former British Army vehicles delivered in 2015.
Bars-6		Ukraine	Infantry mobility vehicle		90	Cheap armoured personnel carrier produced in Cherkassy.
Bars-8		Ukraine	Infantry mobility vehicle		90	Cheap armoured personnel carrier produced in Cherkassy.
Novator		Ukraine	Infantry mobility vehicle		60+	Adopted for service with National Guard.
KrAZ Raptor		Ukraine	Armoured personnel carrier		?	Adopted by the National Guard in 2014.
Humvee		United States	Armored car		?	

=== Artillery ===
Model	Image	Origin	Type	Variant	Number	Details
D-30		Soviet Union	Towed 122mm howitzer		?	
M777		United States		?	An undisclosed number is used by the National Guard.	
TRF1		France		?	An undisclosed number is operated by the Azov Brigade.	
T-12		Soviet Union	100mm Anti-tank gun	MT-12 Rapira	?	
2S1		Soviet Union	122mm Self-Propelled howitzer		?	

=== Utility vehicles ===
Model	Image	Origin	Variant	Number	Details
UAZ		USSR	UAZ-452		
UAZ		USSR	UAZ-469		Inherited from the Soviet Union.
FSR		Poland	Tarpan Honker		Crowdfunded by Polish citizens in 2014.
Bogdan		Ukraine	Bogdan-2251		Ambulance based on the Great Wall Wingle 5 chassis.
Toyota		Japan	Toyota Hilux		Used as technicals.
Toyota		Japan	Toyota Tundra		Used as technicals.
Mitsubishi		Japan	Mitsubishi L200	15+	Used as technicals.
Nissan		Japan	Nissan Navara		Used as technicals.
Nissan		Japan	Nissan King Cab		Used as technicals.
Isuzu		Japan	Isuzu D-Max		Used as technicals.
Mazda		Japan	Mazda BT-50		Used as technicals.
Mazda		Japan	Mazda B2500		Used as technicals.
Ford		United States	Ford Transit	45	Purchased in 2021.
Ford		United States	Ford Ranger		Used as technicals.
Jeep		United States	Jeep Gladiator		Used as technicals.
Volkswagen		Germany	Volkswagen Transporter		

==== Trucks ====
Model	Image	Country of origin	Type	Variant	Number	Details
Ural-4320		Soviet Union	Medium			
ZiL-131		Soviet Union	Medium			
GAZ-66		Soviet Union	Medium			
KamAZ-5320		Soviet Union	Heavy (8 tonnes)			
KamAZ-4310		Soviet Union	Heavy (6 tonnes)			
KAMAZ-43114		Russia	Heavy (6 tonnes)			Purchased prior to the Russo-Ukrainian war.
KrAZ-257		Soviet Union	Heavy (12 tonnes)			
KrAZ-255		Soviet Union	Heavy (12 tonnes)	KrAZ-255B		
KrAZ-260		Soviet Union	Heavy	KrAZ-260; ATs-10-260		
KrAZ-6322		Ukraine	Heavy			
KrAZ-6510		Ukraine	Heavy	Dump truck		
KrAZ-5233		Ukraine	Heavy (6 tonnes)	KrAZ-5233VE; KrAZ-5233NE		
MAZ-4371		Belarus	Medium	MAZ-4371N2		
MAZ-5316		Belarus; Ukraine	Heavy (7.5 tonnes)	Bogdan-5316		Assembled locally.
MAZ-6317		Belarus; Ukraine	Heavy (11 tonnes)	Bogdan-6317		Assembled locally.
Renault TRM 10000		France	Heavy (10 tonnes)			Used for towing TRF1 howitzers.

=== Aircraft ===
Model! Image	Origin	Type	Number	Details	
Aircraft
Antonov An-26		Soviet Union; Ukraine	Transport	20	
Antonov An-72		Soviet Union; Ukraine	Transport	2	
Tupolev Tu-134		Soviet Union	Transport	2	
Helicopters
Mil Mi-2		Polish People's Republic; Poland; Ukraine	Utility	1	Upgraded to the Mi-2MSB standard.
Mil Mi-8		USSR	Transport	7	
Airbus Helicopters H125		France; Europe	Utility	2	
Airbus H225		France; Europe	Transport	4	
Unmanned aerial vehicles
BpAK P-100		Ukraine			

== See also ==
- List of equipment of the Armed Forces of Ukraine

== Bibliography ==
- Galeotti, Mark (27 June 2019). Armies of Russia's War in Ukraine. Bloomsbury Publishing. ISBN 978-1-4728-3346-4.
- Ferguson, Jonathan; Jenzen-Jones, N.R. (November 2014). Raising Red Flags: An Examination of Arms & Munitions in the Ongoing Conflict in Ukraine, 2014 (PDF) (Report). Australia: Armament Research Services (ARES). ISBN 978-0-9924624-3-7.
- International Institute for Strategic Studies (15 February 2023). The Military Balance 2023 (1st ed.). Routledge. p. 204. ISBN 978-1032508955.
