= Atlant Aero Molniya =

Russian military multi-role drone (UAV)

Molniya
- Molniya-1
- Type: Loitering munition
- Place of origin: Russian Federation

Service history
- In service: 2024 – present
- Used by: Russian Armed Forces
- Wars: Russo-Ukrainian war

Production history
- Designer: Atlant Aero (Taganrog, Rostov Oblast, Russia)
- Unit cost: Estimated cost $300 to $2,000 USD(depending on configuration)

The Molniya line of drones, the Molniya-1, Molniya-2 and Molniya-13 (Russian: Lightning-1/Lightning-2/Lightning-13) are Russian made FPV 'fixed-wing' strike and reconnaissance drones, designed by Atlant Aero and operated by the Armed Forces of the Russian Federation. It utilizes a low-cost "flat-pack" design, allowing it to be disassembled and transported inside backpacks and other lightweight transports. It is manufactured out of plywood, foam, plastic and aluminum. The Molniya serves as a low-cost platform capable of field assembly and mass production. The drone is in use in the ongoing Russia-Ukraine conflict.

== Specification ==
Wingspan: ~1.5 meters

Weight(Max): 10 kg

Range: 30–50 km

Speed: 90–150 km/h

Endurance: ~40 minutes

Payload: 3–5 kg, or 13kg for Molniya-13

== Tactical role ==
It is noted for its multi-role capability, for both surveillance and one-way attack.

== Payloads and usage ==
- TM-62 (Anti-Tank Mine) and other standard Anti-Tank/Anti-Personnel Munitions: taped or bracketed directly to the fuselage or wing mounts.
- RPG-7 warheads, modified 82mm Mortar Rounds and various hand grenades rigged with custom impact-detonation or electrical trip-wire fuses.
- On-site 'improvised' munition(s) e.g. bundles of explosives packed with loose steel ball bearings, nails, or cut rebar to maximize anti-personnel fragmentation effects over open terrain and trenches.

=== Specialized variants ===
- A 'Mothership carrier' role transporting a smaller first-person view (FPV) strike drone to target areas before release.
- Fiber optic or AI guidance capability.
- Reconnaissance variants, configured for surveillance rather than a one-way attack.

=== Differences ===
Molniya-1: Fixed-wing layout with a single electric motor (distinguishing it from the twin-motor Molniya-2)

Molniya-2/Molniya-2R: advanced variants utilize AI-powered machine vision for attacks in radio silence, also compatible with integrated satellite communication terminals (like GLONASS and Starlink) to resist electronic interference.

Molniya-13: Four electric motors with a modified fuselage, whilst still including improved AI and satellite communication capability, and an increased maximum payload size of 13kg.

== Operational history ==
Both variants have been used since 2024 against Ukraine.

The Atlant Aero production facilities which manufacturer Molniya drones were targeted by Ukraine in 2026.
