= Equalizer (munition) =

Ukrainian glide bomb

Equalizer (or Leveler) (Ukrainian: Вирівнювач, romanized: Vyrivniuvach)
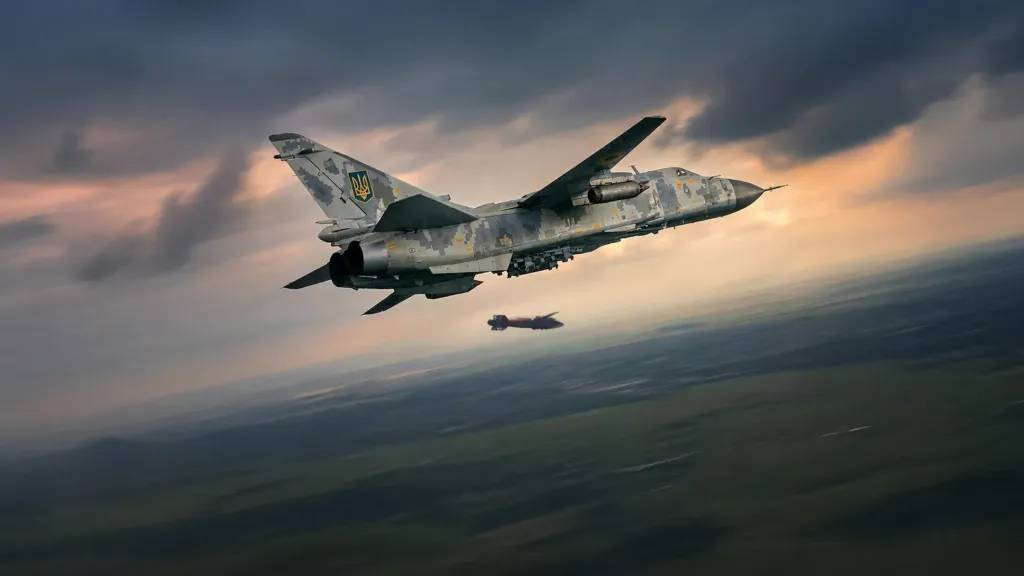
- Dropping of the "Vyrivniuvach" from an Su-24
- Place of origin: Ukraine

Production history
- Designer: DG Industry

Specifications
- Effective firing range: 40 km (25 mi) low-altitude
- Maximum firing range: 130 km (81 mi) high-altitude
- Filling weight: 250 kg (0.25 t; 550 lb)

The Equalizer (or Leveler) (Ukrainian: Вирівнювач, romanized: Vyrivniuvach) is a Ukrainian designed and made and cost-saving guided glide bomb. The combat readiness of the bomb was announced on May 18, 2026 by Ukraine's Brave1 initiative. The bomb has been dropped in the space of battle.

== Background ==
During the Russo-Ukrainian war, military doctrine of both sides has called for massed fire by artillery. Drone warfare has devastated and pushed back artillery from the front line. Standoff weapons like glide bombs have tended to replace them.

== Development ==
The precision-guided munition was conceived from scratch rather than copied from Western or Soviet systems over almost a year and a half by DG Industry. On May 18, 2026 Ukrainian Minister of Defence Mykhailo Fedorov announced that the new guided aerial bomb had passed the necessary testing and was ready for combat. He noted Ukrainian pilots had been developing combat scenarios and adapting the use of the new bomb to battlefield conditions, and soon aerial bombs would be used in the Russo-Ukrainian war.

== Design ==
The weapon is equipped with a warhead weighing 250 kg (0.25 t; 550 lb) and is designed to strike targets 40 kilometers to 130 kilometers away, depending on the altitude of the drop. It is equipped with modern guidance algorithms to improve target strike accuracy. It's intended to be ready for use in 30 minutes and effective in all weather conditions. It is compatible with Ukrainian aircraft and weapons systems, and can also be deployed from F-16 and Mirage 2000 fighters after additional certification.

=== Cost and affordability ===
The aerial bomb costs approximately three times less than American JDAM guided munition kits, which have also been in service with Ukraine since at least early 2023.

== Operators ==
The Ministry of Defence of Ukraine has purchased the first experimental batch of munitions.

== Operational history ==
As of late June 2026, battlefield use of the ordinance has been documented.

== See also ==
- List of equipment of the Armed Forces of Ukraine
- List of Russo-Ukrainian war military equipment
- Aerial warfare in the Russo-Ukrainian war
- Defense industry of Ukraine
- Precision-guided munition
- FP-5 Flamingo
- Guided bomb
- Glide bomb
