= 2B14 Podnos =

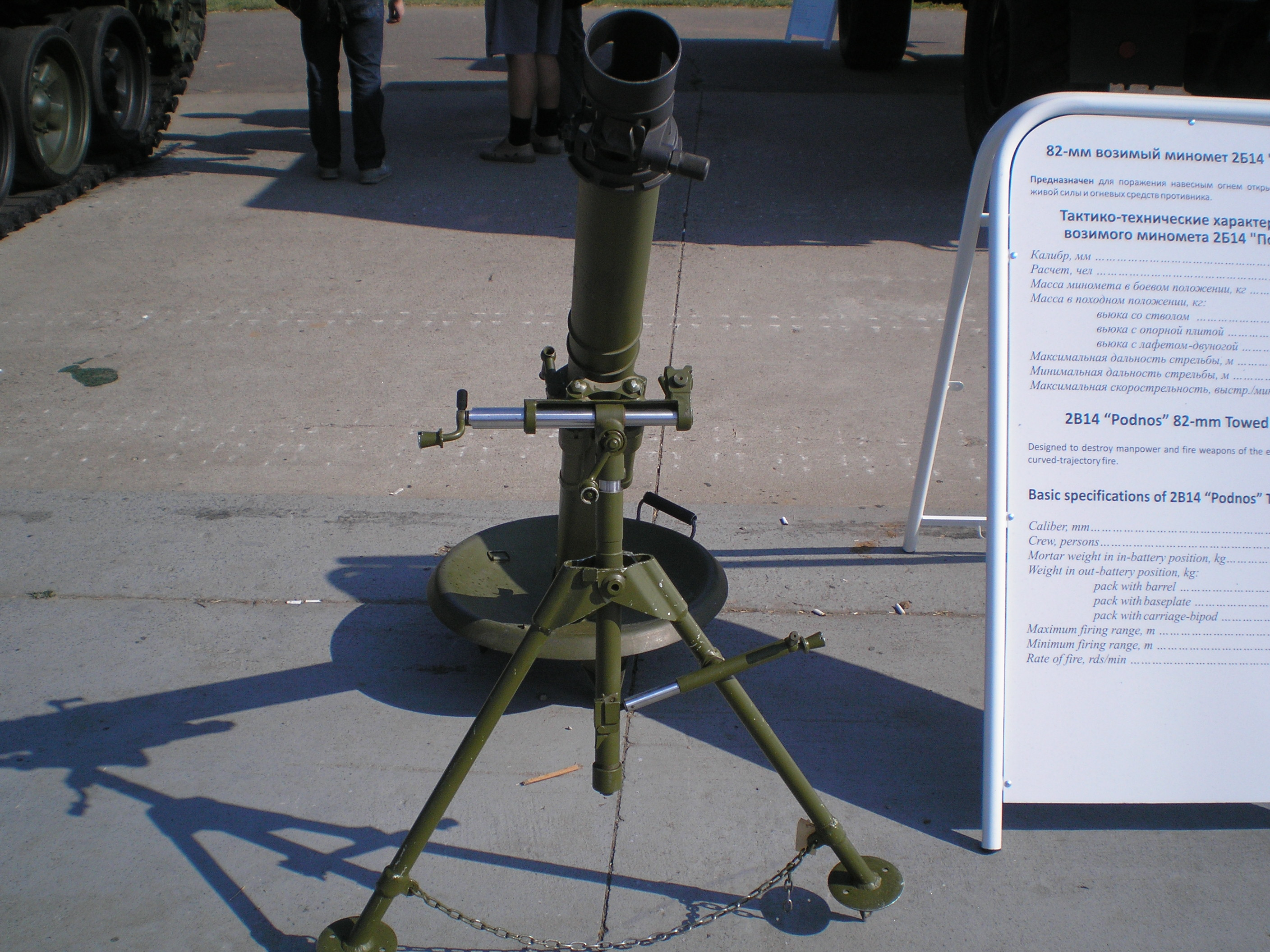
- 2B14 Podnos mortar at "Engineering Technologies 2010" forum
- Type: Mortar
- Place of origin: Soviet Union

Service history
- In service: 1980s
- Wars: Soviet–Afghan War; Lebanese Civil War; Syrian Civil War; Russo-Ukrainian War

Production history
- Designed: 1983
- Manufacturer: Gorky Engineering Plant

Specifications
- Mass: 41.88 kg (92.3 lb)
- Crew: 4
- Shell: 3.14 kg (6 lb 15 oz) HE
- Caliber: 82 mm (3.2 in)
- Carriage: 2F510 2x1 wheeled transport chassis, GAZ-66 4×4 truck (prime mover)
- Elevation: 45°–85°
- Traverse: ±8° (without bipod repositioning)
- Rate of fire: 24-30 rounds per minute
- Effective firing range: Minimum: 0.08 km (0.050 mi); Maximum: 4.27 km (2.65 mi)

The 2B14 Podnos (Russian: 2Б14 «Поднос», "Tray" or "Platter") is a 82mm mortar designed and manufactured in the Soviet Union in early 1980s. The 2B14 was designed as a man-portable indirect fire weapon for the use by airborne and light infantry forces of the Soviet Armed Forces, but has been fielded with regular motor rifle units as well at a scale of six per battalion.

== Variants ==
- 2B14 (2Б14)
- 2B14-1 (2Б14-1-1)

== Operators ==
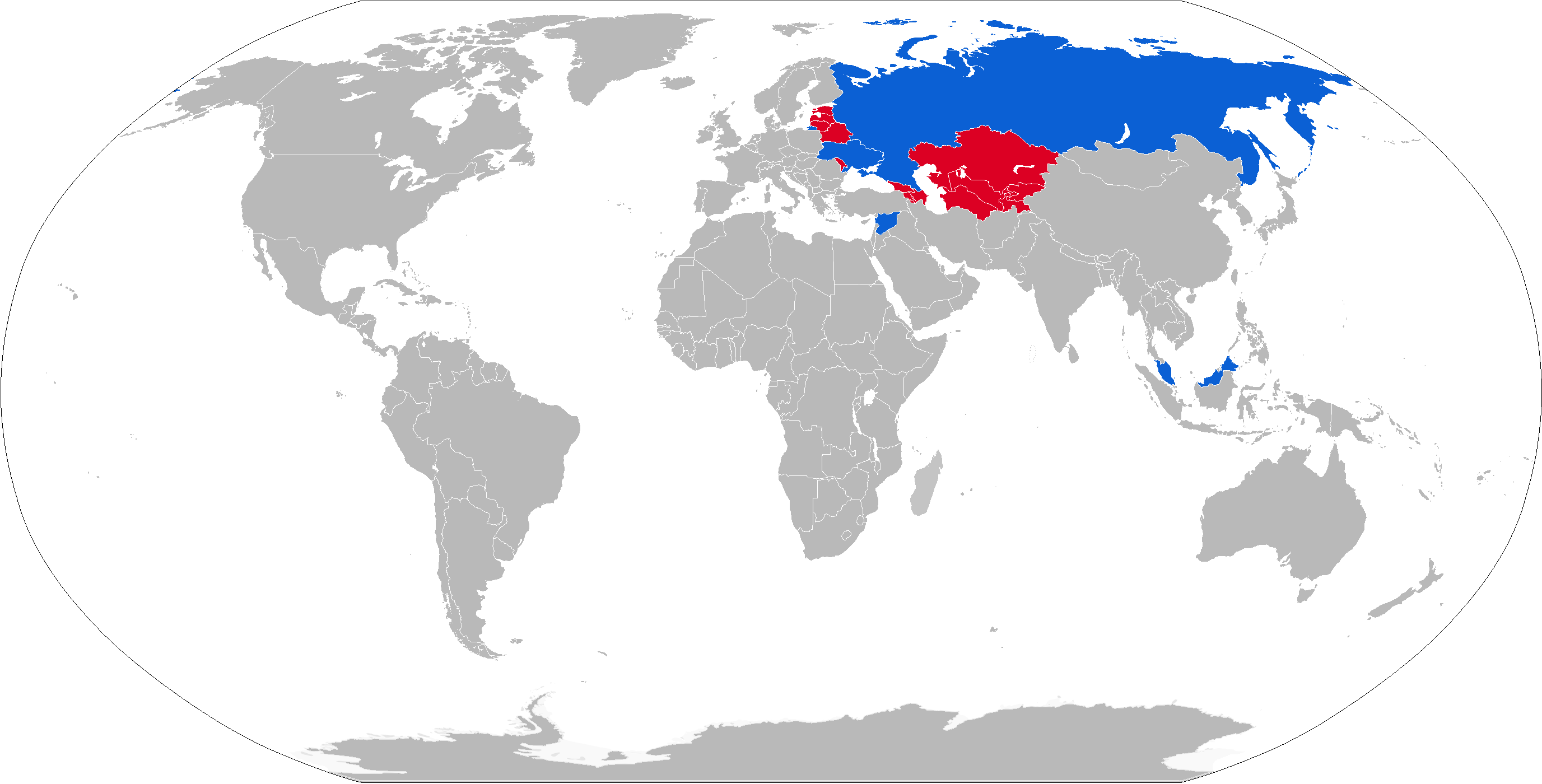
Map with 2B14 operators (blue) and former operators (red)

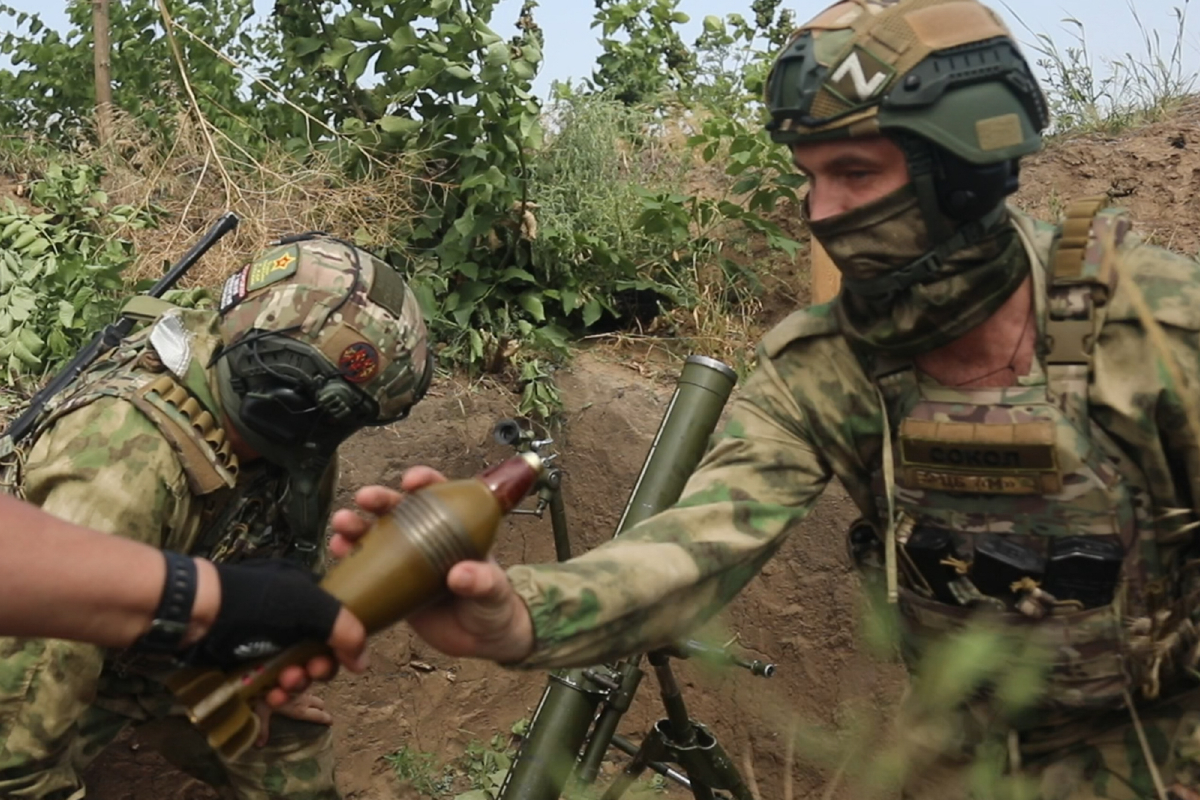
Russian Ground Forces soldiers firing a 2B14 mortar during the Russian invasion of Ukraine.

=== Current operators ===
- Donetsk People's Republic – Used by the 1st Army Corps.
- Georgia – Used by the Georgian Army.
- Luhansk People's Republic – Used by the 2nd Army Corps.
- Malaysia – Used by the Malaysian Army.
- Russia – Used by the Russian Ground Forces, about 276 are believed to be in service and 3,000 in storage.
- Syria – Used with the Syrian Arab Army.
- Ukraine – Used by the Ukrainian Armed Forces.

=== Former operators ===
- Soviet Union – Passed down to successor states in 1991.
- Estonia
- Latvia
- Lithuania
- Kazakhstan
- Tajikistan
- Turkmenistan
- Uzbekistan
- Lebanese Forces

== See also ==
- List of equipment of the Russian Ground Forces
- List of equipment of the Armed Forces of Ukraine
