= Punisher (drone) =

Ukrainian unmanned aerial vehicle

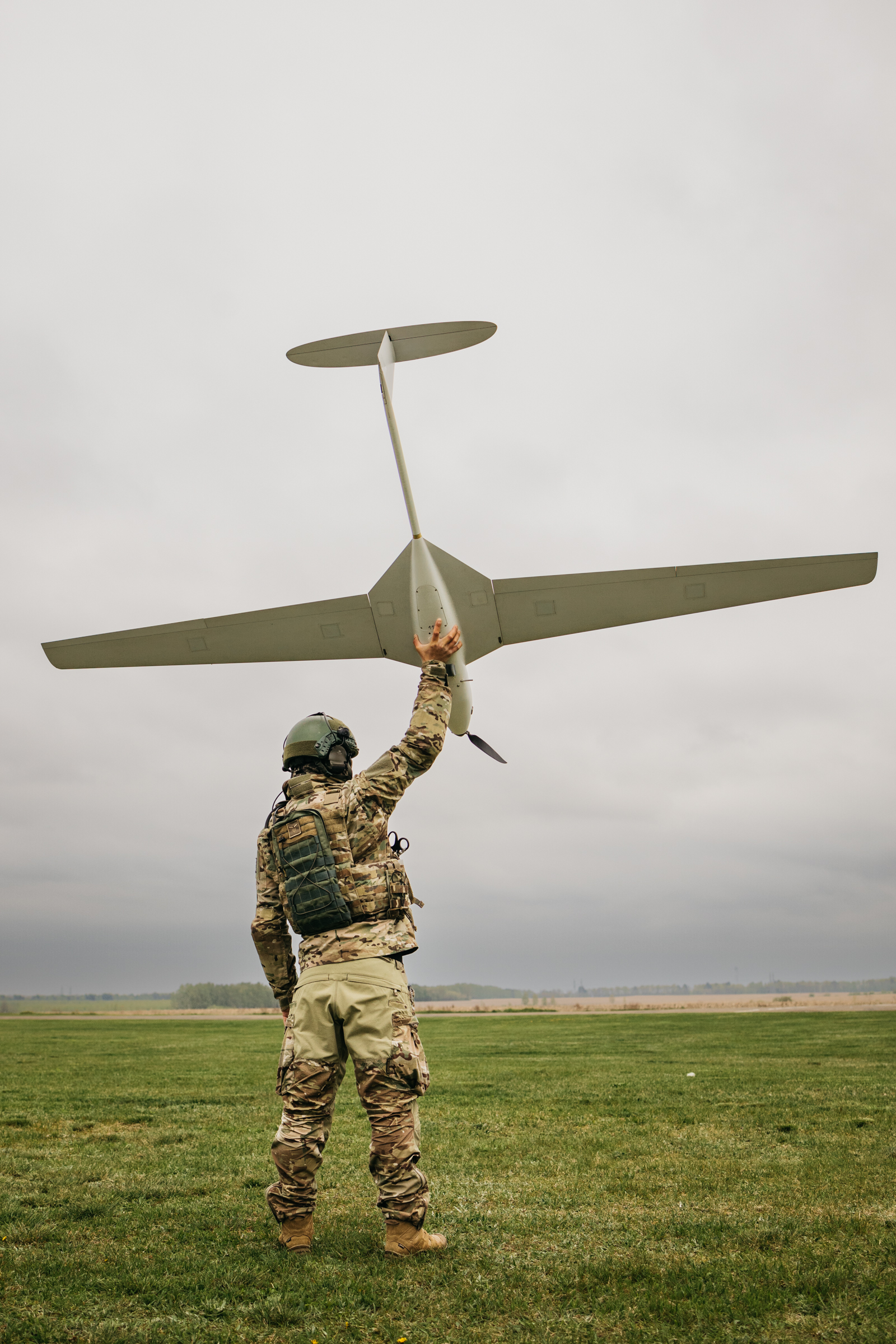
Punisher drone

UCAV Punisher is a multifunctional unmanned combat aerial vehicle (UCAV), which was developed in 2016 by Ukrainian combat veterans. Since 2019, the system has been supplied to the Ukrainian Armed Forces partially funded by individuals. UCAV Punisher has been officially contracted by the Ukrainian Armed Forces from 18.08.2023.

The UCAV Punisher can be used for medical and rescue purposes, as well as for reconnaissance and combat missions behind enemy lines. UCAV Punisher was designed to perform such tasks as aerial reconnaissance, direct action special operations, logistics and support for special operations, search and rescue, and psychological operations.

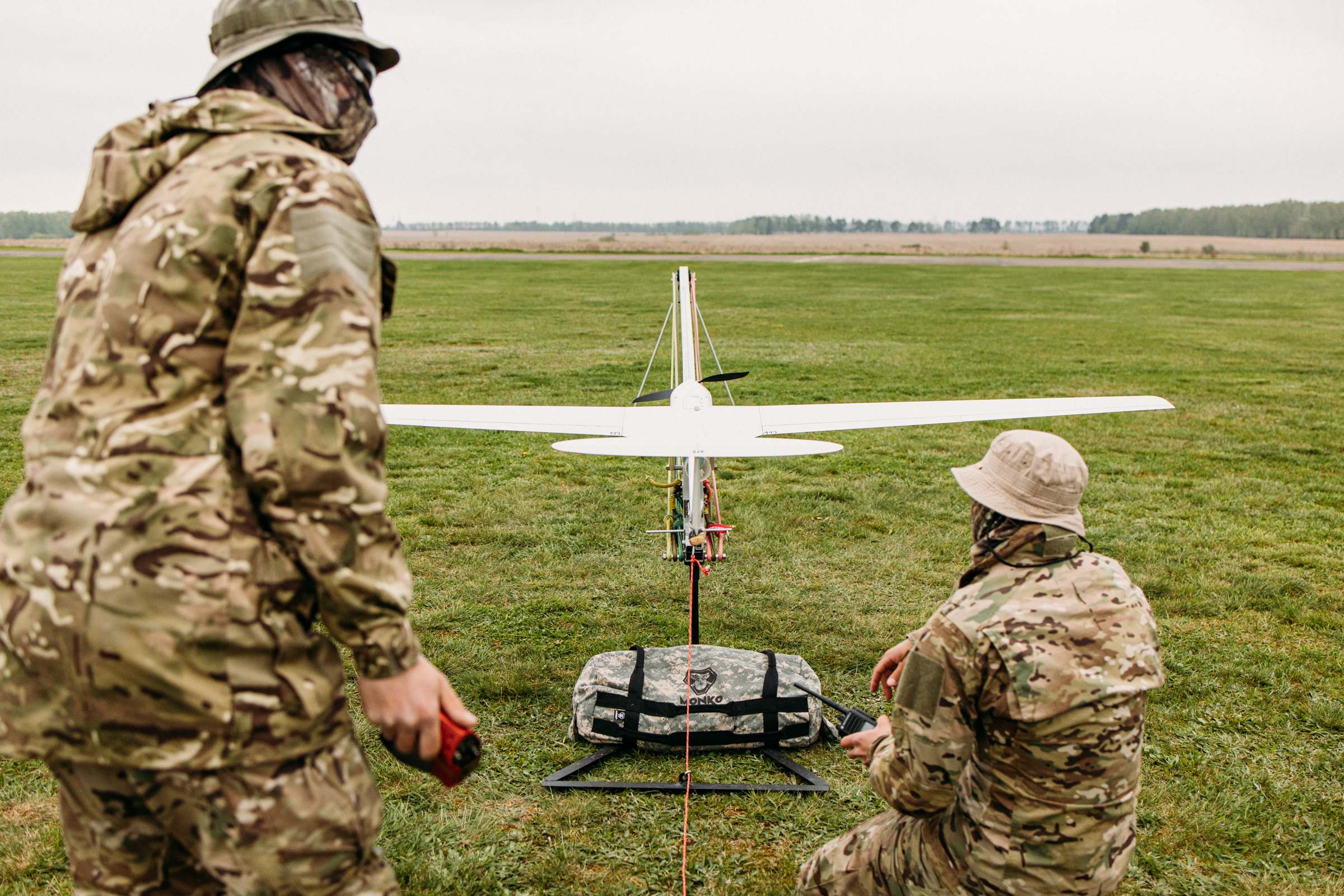
Launch of the Punisher drone

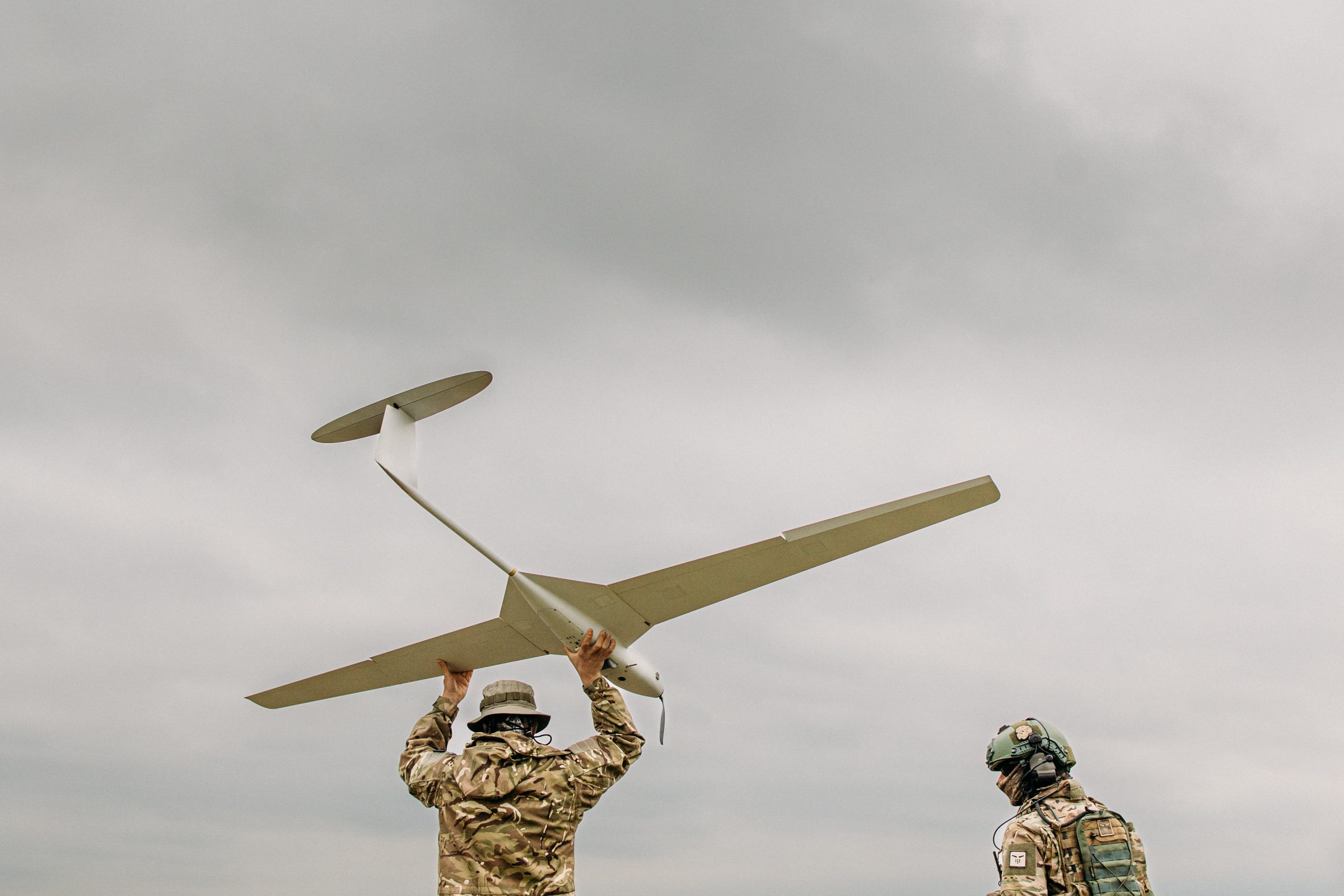
Flight Punisher Drone

== Specifications ==
General characteristics

- Crew: 0 onboard, 3 in ground station
- Length: 1.47 m / 4.99 ft
- Wingspan: 2.92 m / 9.69 ft
- The maximum takeoff weight (MTOW): 7.5 kg / 16.85 lb
- Payload: 2.5 kg / 5.5 lb

Technical characteristics

- Maximum speed: 55 m/s / 107 kn
- Cruise speed: 28 m/s / 39 kn
- Operational altitude: 400 m / 1312 ft
- Range: 45 km / 28 mi
- Preparation for launch - 10 min
- Reloading - 5 min
- Drop accuracy - 4 m / 13 feet
- Blast radius - 50 m / 164 ft

Components included

- 2 striking and reconnaissance UCAVs
- 3 sets of batteries
- Catapult for UCAV launching
- Roda Lizard ground control station with an additional set of batteries
- Antenna
- Trackball and antenna cable, standardized according to STANAG
- Ballistic calculator
- A set of modular components
- Transport cases
- Spare components
- Repair kit

== Armament ==
UCAV Punisher is equipped with a patented modular payload system reducing costs and increasing the number of missions. There are three types of payload containers.

UB-F1-75HE GAMECHANGER

- Unguided bomb - FIST1 -75mm - HE/FRAG
- Diameter 75 mm
- Length 550 mm
- Weight 2.5 kg
- High explosive fragmentation bomb designed to destroy enemy troops, lightly armored targets, field command posts, radar, electronic warfare, and electronic warfare stations.

UB-F2-75HEAT NUTCRACKER

- Unguided bomb - FIST2 -75mm — cumulative
- Diameter 75 mm
- Length 550 mm
- Weight 2.5 kg
- High explosive, unguided bomb designed to destroy enemy heavy equipment, fortified command posts. Can also be used against watercraft.

UB-F3-75HEI BBQ

- Unguided bomb - FIST3 -75mm HE/FRAG, cumulative
- Diameter 75 mm
- Length 550 mm
- Weight 2.5 kg
- High explosive fragmentation, cumulative unguided bomb designed to destroy enemy troops, lightly armored targets, field command stations, radar, EW, and EW stations, as well as ammunition and fuel depots.

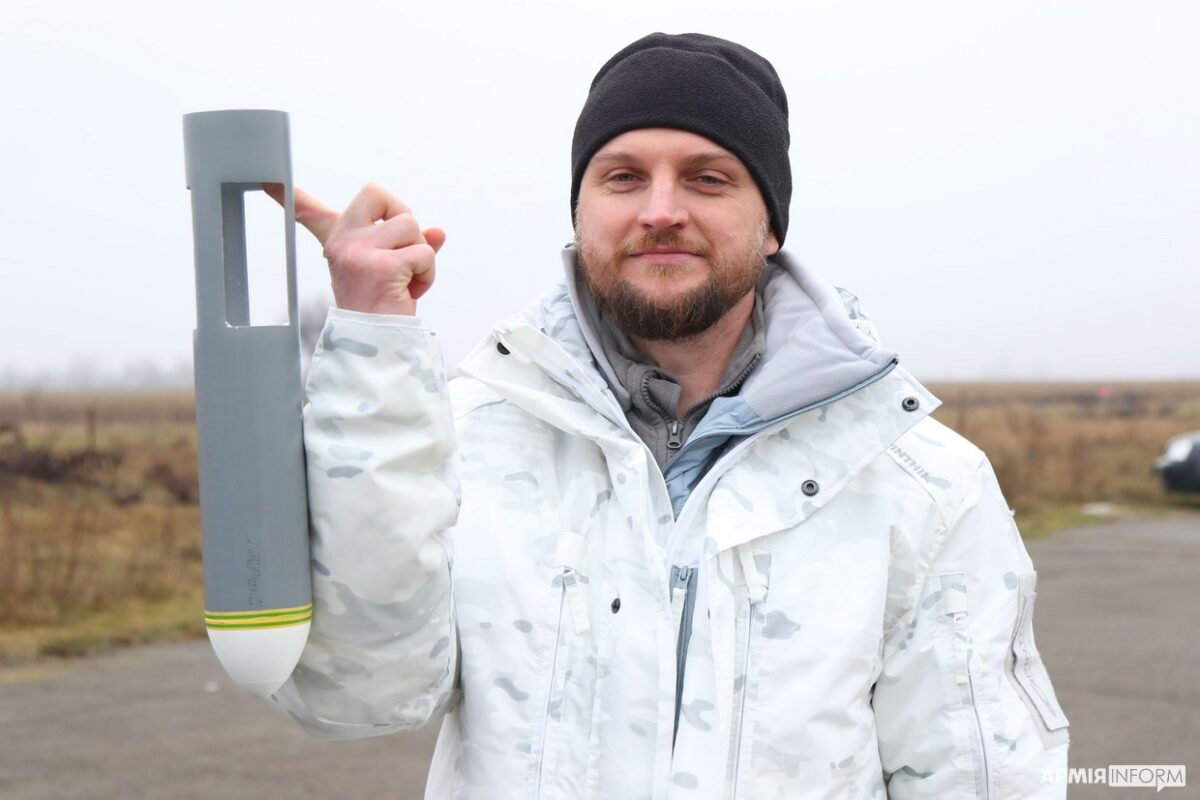
payload container

== Unmanned system control ==
Each system is operated by a crew of three servicemen: an external pilot, an operator and a technician. The manufacturer trains operators at official training centres of the Armed Forces of Ukraine.

== Features ==
This drone has low operating costs, both due to the reusability of scarce system components and the low cost of manufacturing payload containers.

The drone can be launched from a catapult up to an altitude of 400 m quietly and without heat trail, preventing its detection by air defences.

The targeting and navigation system is separated between the drone and the ground control station and the navigation data is additionally protected in case of loss or capture.

== History ==
UCAV Punisher development started in 2015 to support the Ukrainian Armed Forces during the Russian-Ukrainian war. In 2016 production and crew training began. Since then, more than 100 crews have been trained to operate the UCAV Punisher. By 2022 more than 230 drones had been used in combat operations.

The drones are presented in international exhibitions such as the Ukrainian pavilion at Defence and Security Equipment International (DSEI) 2023 in London.
