= Varan (camouflage) =

Ukrainian military camouflage pattern

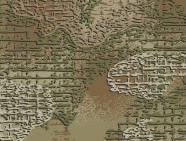
- Type: Military camouflage pattern
- Place of origin: Ukraine

Service history
- In service: 2015–present
- Wars: Russo-Ukrainian War; War in Donbas

Production history
- Designer: P1G Tac
- Designed: 2012
- Produced: 2012–present

The Varan (Ukrainian: Варан, lit. 'monitor lizard'), also sometimes referred to as "toad", is a camouflage pattern that has been in use by the Armed Forces of Ukraine since 2015.

It is issued to Ukrainian soldiers with a summer suit, a Mazepynka cap, a panama hat, and a helmet cover with a pair of T-shirts and shorts.

== History ==
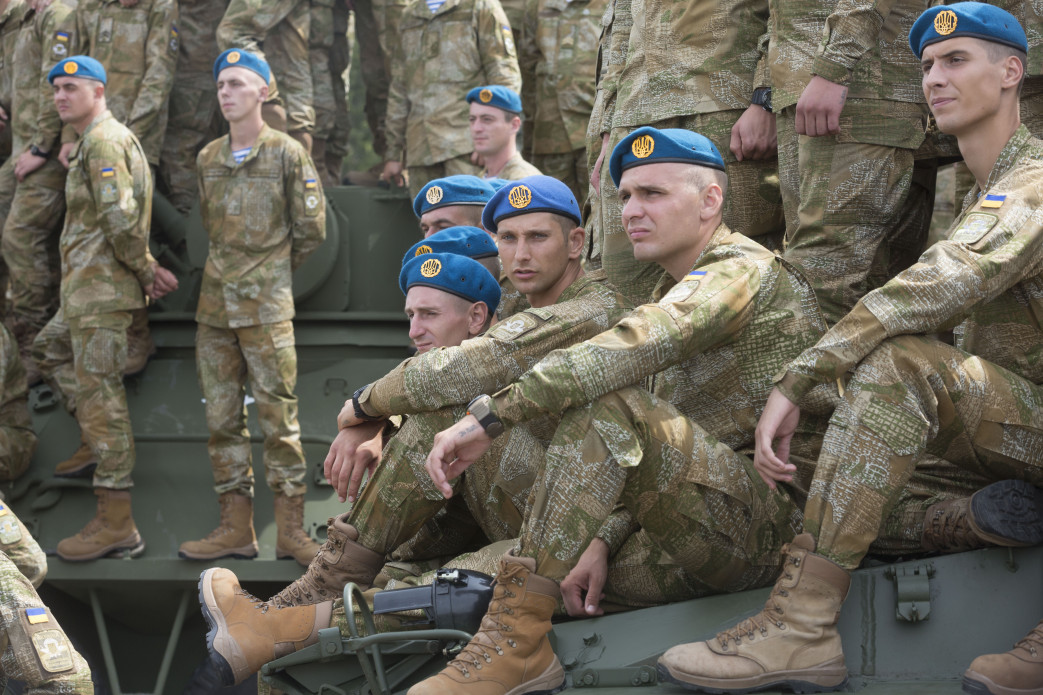
95th AAB paratroopers wearing Varan uniforms.

The Varan was originally designed by P1G Tac in 2012. The design process took approximately one year. It was originally designed to blend in well with the steppes of Eastern Ukraine. It was first presented to the public in 2014.

The pattern first entered service with the Ukrainian military in July 2015, when the 79th Air Assault Brigade announced that it would be adopting the pattern as standard issue. It was tested within their ranks for three months.

On 14 June 2017, an investigation was launched by the National Anti-Corruption Bureau and the Specialized Anti-Corruption Prosecutor's Office on why the Ukrainian Ministry of Defense received inferior quality Varan uniforms.

== Design ==
The Varan was developed by six persons under the Minister of Defense of Ukraine No. 281/z.

It is a five-tone natural camouflage pattern utilizing shades of green, brown, and beige. It is designed specifically to work well in arid desert and woodland environments.

== Users ==
- Ukraine: In use with the Ukrainian military.
