= RGP-40 =

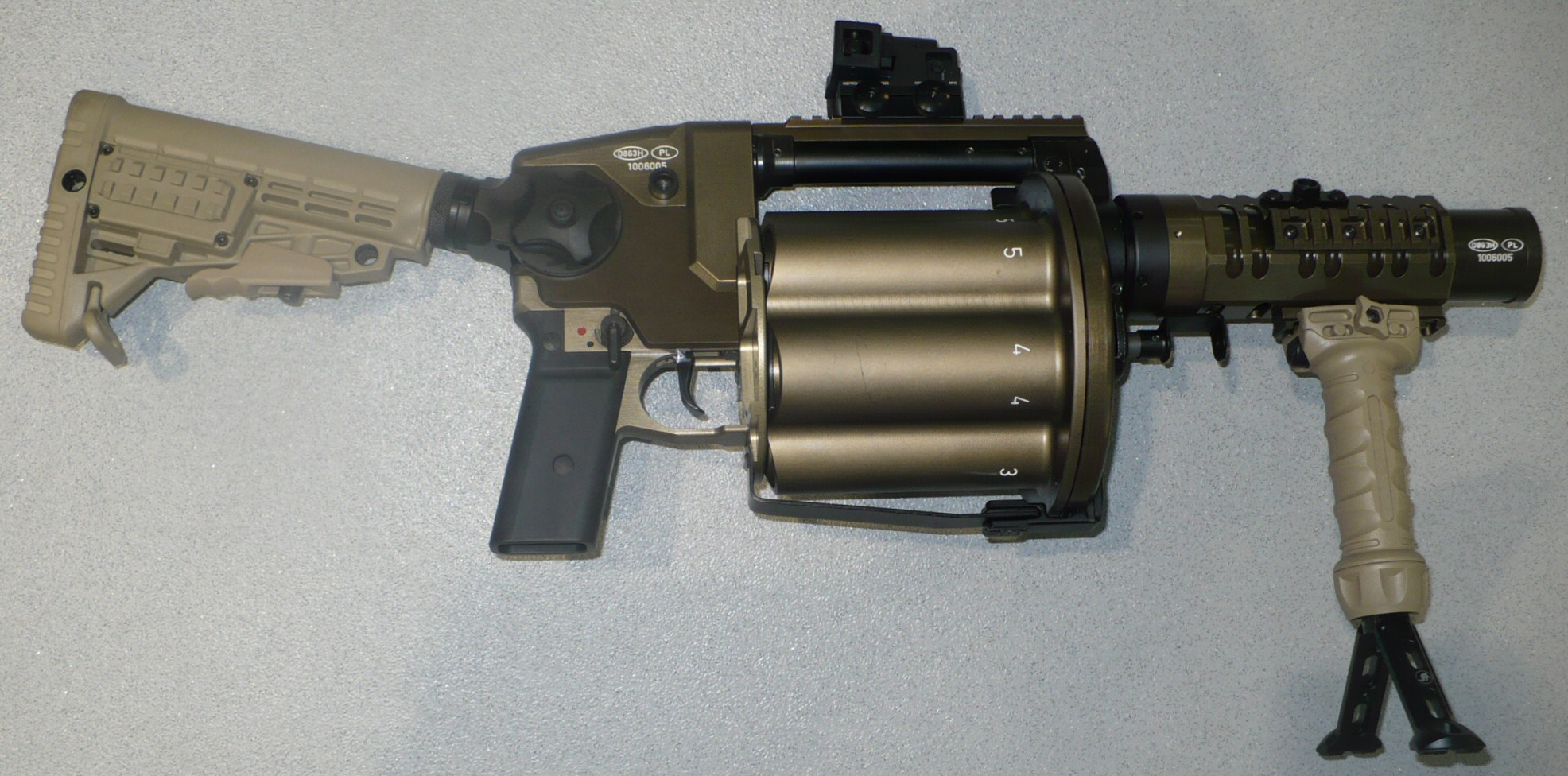
- 2010 version of RGP-40 (production model differs)
- Type: Multiple-shot Grenade Launcher
- Place of origin: Poland

Service history
- In service: 2017-present
- Used by: Ukrainian Ground Forces
- Wars: Russo-Ukrainian War

Production history
- Designer: WAT and OBR SM Tarnów
- Designed: 2008-2010
- Manufacturer: Zakłady Mechaniczne Tarnów
- Produced: 2017-present

Specifications
- Barrel length: 250 mm (9.8 in)
- Cartridge: 40x46mm SR
- Caliber: 40 mm
- Feed system: 6-round, revolving, swing out-type cylinder
- Sights: Reflex sights has built-in Picatinny rails

The RGP-40 (Ręczny Granatnik Powtarzalny 40 mm - 40 mm handheld repeating grenade launcher) is a Polish six-shot revolver-type 40 mm grenade launcher designed by WAT and OBR SM Tarnów and produced by ZM Tarnów. Its design is heavily influenced by the M32 MGL.

== History ==
The first prototype was created in 2008 and was revealed during the MSPO 2008 Kielce exhibition. The weapon is visually similar to the South African Milkor MGL, especially the M32 MGL variant. Its final mass production design may be different from the proposed prototype. It is planned to replace the stock with a grenade launcher-specific proprietary telescoping stock, among some other things used in the prototype to improve ergonomics and functionality.

According to plans, the main recipient of RGP-40 would be the Polish Armed Forces, which according to the estimates, would require about 500 multiple-shot grenade launchers. Other potential buyers of this weapon can also be Police, Prison Service and other Law Enforcement forces that need weapons with high firepower capable of firing tear gas and non-lethal ammunition.

Polish Army ordered 200 RGP-40 in 2016, but eventually refused to accept manufactured grenade launchers, considering them as not meeting Army requirements. Three RGP-40 were bought in 2017 by Polish Police.

During the prelude to the Russian invasion of Ukraine, in early 2022 a batch of stored RGP-40 was given by Polish government to Ukraine, and then used by Ukrainian Ground Forces.

== Design ==
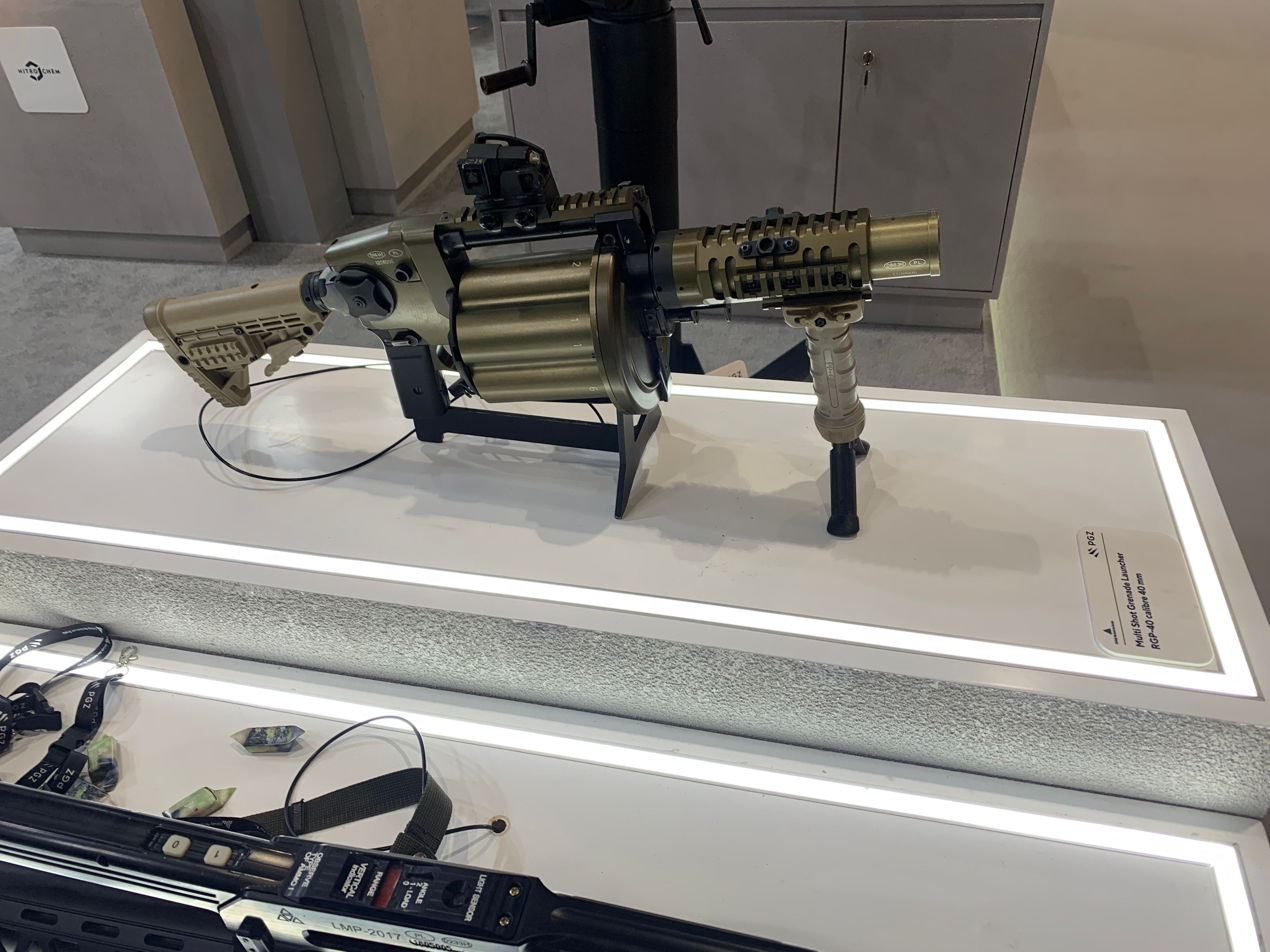
RGP-40 present at the IDEX 2025.

The RGP-40 is a shoulder-fired 40 mm grenade launcher with a six-round spring-driven revolver-style magazine capable of accepting most 40×46mm grenades. The spring-driven cylinder rotates automatically 60° while firing, but it must be wound back up after every reloading.

The main element of the weapon is the frame to which a revolver-style magazine is attached. While shooting the drum is rotated 60 degrees by the springs wound back up when loading the cartridges into weapon.

The magazine is capable of holding six rounds. Chamber of cartridge has a length of 140 mm, which allows the user to use both combat ammunition and special longer cartridges.

Before loading cartridges, the magazine must be rotated to left or right (Magazine is of Swing-out type cylinder type).

RGP-40 uses a double-action trigger. To prevent accidental engagement and firing, there is an ambidextrous safety selector at the top of pistol grip.

RGP-40 is equipped with a Picatinny rail on top of the magazine and three rails surrounding the barrel. It is also equipped with a telescopic buttstock that can be rotated vertically for better weapon handling.

== Users ==
- Ukraine: Donated by Poland in the prelude to the Russian invasion of Ukraine.

== See also ==
- RG-6 grenade launcher
- Milkor MGL
- Granatnik wz. 36
