= Renault TRM 10000 =

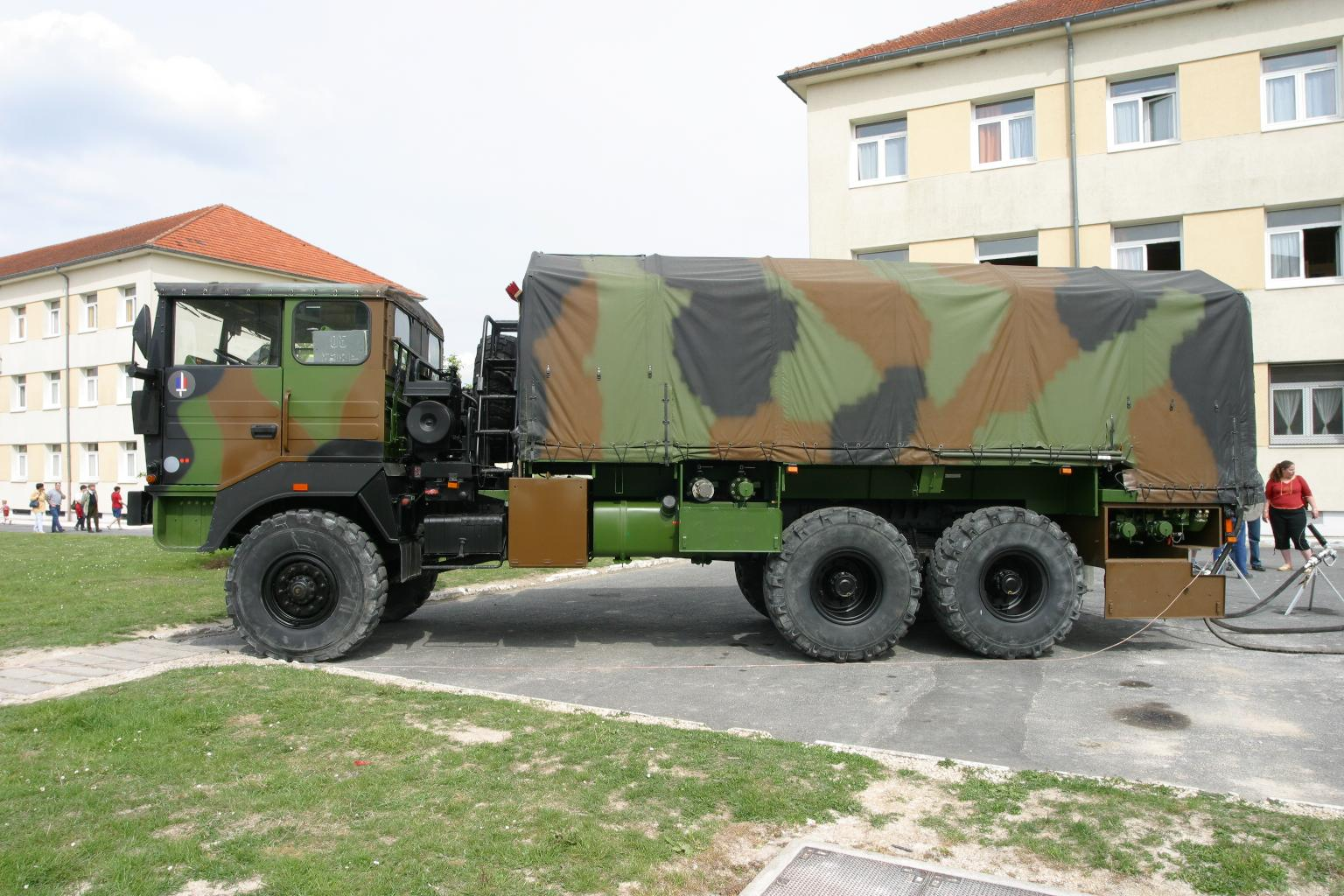
- Type: Heavy cargo truck
- Place of origin: France

Service history
- In service: 1987–Present
- Used by: French Army

Production history
- Manufacturer: Renault Trucks
- Produced: 1985 to Present
- No. built: ~1000
- Variants: Renault TRM 700-100 Renault TRM 10000 CLD

Specifications
- Length: 9.31 m
- Width: 2.50 m
- Height: 3.32 m
- Crew: 2 + 24
- Engine: Renault 9.8-liter diesel 264 hp
- Payload capacity: 10,000 kg
- Ground clearance: 0.63 m
- Fuel capacity: 500 l
- Operational range: 1,200 km
- Maximum speed: 89 km/h

The Renault TRM 10000 is a truck used by the French armed forces since 1987. It is utilized both as a troop transport and logistics vehicle.

== History ==
Production of the TRM 10000 began in 1985. It was developed from the TRM 9000, which was a 9-ton truck designated for export. The TRM 10000 has a longer wheelbase, a revised transmission and a more powerful engine.

After an initial order of 178 vehicles, a second order for 759 trucks was placed in 1987. Originally scheduled for a production of 5,000 trucks, only about 1,000 trucks were produced.

== Characteristics ==
The TRM has a six-cylinder diesel engine, the MIDR 06.20.45 and has a 6x6 drive for use on roads, trails and off-road.
