= Bogdan Corporation =

Ukrainian automobile trading and manufacturing company

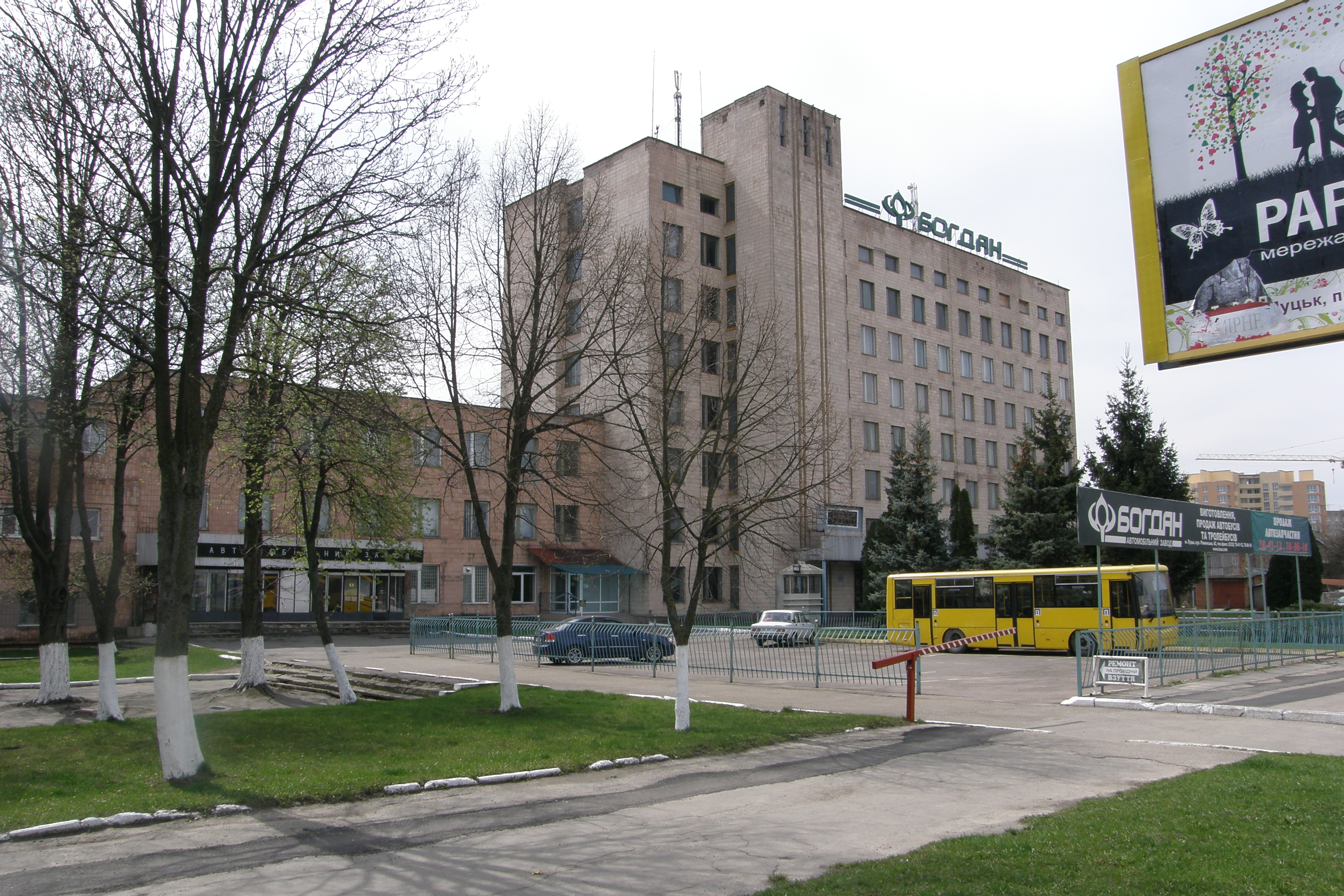
- Bogdan Motors Assembly Plant #1 in Lutsk
- Native name: Корпорація «Богдан»
- Romanized name: Korporatsiia «Bohdan»
- Type: Privately held company
- Industry: Automobile manufacturing Automobile dealership
- Predecessor: UkrPromInvest Auto
- Founded: June 9, 2005; 21 years ago in Kyiv, Ukraine
- Founder: Petro Poroshenko; Oleh Hladkovskyi
- Headquarters: Kyiv, Ukraine
- Key people: Oksana Chernachuk
- Owner: Oleh Hladkovskyi
- Website: bogdan.ua

Bogdan Corporation (Ukrainian: Корпорація «Богдан») is a leading Ukrainian automobile trading and manufacturing group founded by Bogdan Motors. The corporation was famous for its Bogdan public transport brand that used to produce its models in Cherkasy and Lutsk.

The production capacities of Bogdan Corporation used to allow making 120-150 thousand passenger cars, up to 9 thousand buses and trolleybuses in all classes, as well as about 15 thousand trucks and specialized vehicles. However, with the bankruptcy of its parent company, the corporation's factories had stopped working in 2020, and Bogdan only does the foreign car distribution.

== History ==
Bogdan Motors was created in 1993, after the Dissolution of the Soviet Union. Initially, the company was a distributor of various Russian-based vehicles, later selling vehicles by Korean manufacturer, Kia Motors.

In 1998, the company obtained the Cherkasy Automobile Repair Factory that was specializing in repairing buses of the Russian-based Pavlovo Bus Factory and GAZelle. Next year the plant have undergone reconstruction and was transformed into the Cherkasy Autobus that began manufacturing its own buses, Bogdan. That same year, the company signed another contract with Hyundai for distribution of their vehicles.

In 2000, the company bought the bankrupted Soviet LuAZ based in Lutsk (Volyn Oblast), and during the same period, started to produce its own cars based on the Russian AvtoVAZ. In 2003, the company's began exporting the buses.

In 2004, the company signed a general agreement with Isuzu to use the Isuzu brand on the company's exported buses.

In 2005, Bogdan Motors formed a Bogdan Corporation that merged all the previously purchased company. It was decided that the public transport would be assembled in Lutsk and the passenger vehicles would be assembled in Cherkasy.

The 2008 financial crisis caused a big credit load on the corporation and in 2011 the company ended up selling the Cherkasy Autobus to Prominvestbank. The rights to produce the midibus models were left to the factory so Bogdan had to come out with their replacement.

In 2013, Bogdan, in a joint venture with the Polish company Ursus, received an order for 38 trolleybuses for the Lublin, Poland, trolleybus system. The body-and-chassis shells were completed by Bogdan and shipped to an Ursus plant in Lublin, where Ursus would install the axles, electrical equipment, seats and other fittings to complete the vehicles. The first of the 38 Bogdan/Ursus trolleybuses, officially designated as model Ursus T70116, was delivered in mid-2013.

In 2014 the company developed the 'Bars' (panther) multifunctional light armored vehicle to be used by the National Guard of Ukraine.

In 2017 Cherkassy Bogdan Plant transferred to the Armed Forces of Ukraine the first batch of Bogdan-2251 ambulances based on the Chinese Great Wall chassis.

In December 2017, a Bogdan-6317 truck with a Weichal Power engine was allowed for operation in the Armed Forces of Ukraine.

In April 2018, “Bogdan” presented a new multipurpose SUV, “Bogdan 2351”. It should replace the obsolete UAZ. The new car has an engine capacity of 143-horsepower, a higher maximum speed and a carrying capacity of 1000 kg.

In 2018, “Bogdan Motors” agreed on cooperation with the Igor Sikorsky Kyiv Polytechnic Institute. Specialists of “Bohdan” and representatives of the educational institution will jointly develop new technologies and transport. The Science Park "Kyiv Polytechnic" also joined the Agreement. Students of KPI will be able to take industrial practice at “Bogdan Motors”.

In May 2018, “Bogdan” celebrated its 20th anniversary. On the occasion of the holiday, the company organized a large-scale all-Ukrainian action. Residents of the 9 largest cities of Ukraine - Kyiv, Vinnytsia, Khmelnytskyi, Sumy, Odesa, Kremenchuk, Poltava, Kherson, Ivano-Frankivsk - could ride all day in new “Bogdan” large buses and trolley buses free of charge. The campaign covered cities that began upgrading municipal fleet of vehicles and moving from small class buses to modern large and ultra-large transport models. In 20 years, “Bogdan” produced more than 368 thousand vehicles. 18 781 of them are buses and trolleybuses.

In June 2018, "Bogdan" transferred five 12-meter bodies for electric buses to the French manufacturer of ecological transport “Bluebus” under the contract. "Bogdan" shipped the bodies in the period specified by the contract. The French customer highly appreciated the quality of Ukrainian products and expressed interest in continuing cooperation.

In July 2018, Bogdan-Industry LLC, an official importer of GreatWall and HAVAL in Ukraine, opened the first HAVAL official auto show in Ukraine in Kyiv.

Bogdan Corporation presented an updated version of the "Bogdan 2251" ambulance. The new batch of vehicles received more than a dozen improvements.

In August 2018, “Bogdan Corporation” handed over the next batch of “Bogdan 6317” off-road trucks to the army. This year the company plans to transfer more than 200 units of such equipment.

“Bogdan Corporation” military equipment participated in the parade on the Independence Day of Ukraine on August 24. In particular, 7 commander SUVs “Bogdan 2351” and 4 sanitary cars “Bogdan 2251”. The technique drove a column on Khreshchatyk on the occasion of the 27th anniversary of the Independence of Ukraine. In addition, on the Sofia Square an armored multifunctional car of increased passage “Bars-8”, equipped with a 120-mm mobile mortar complex, was presented.

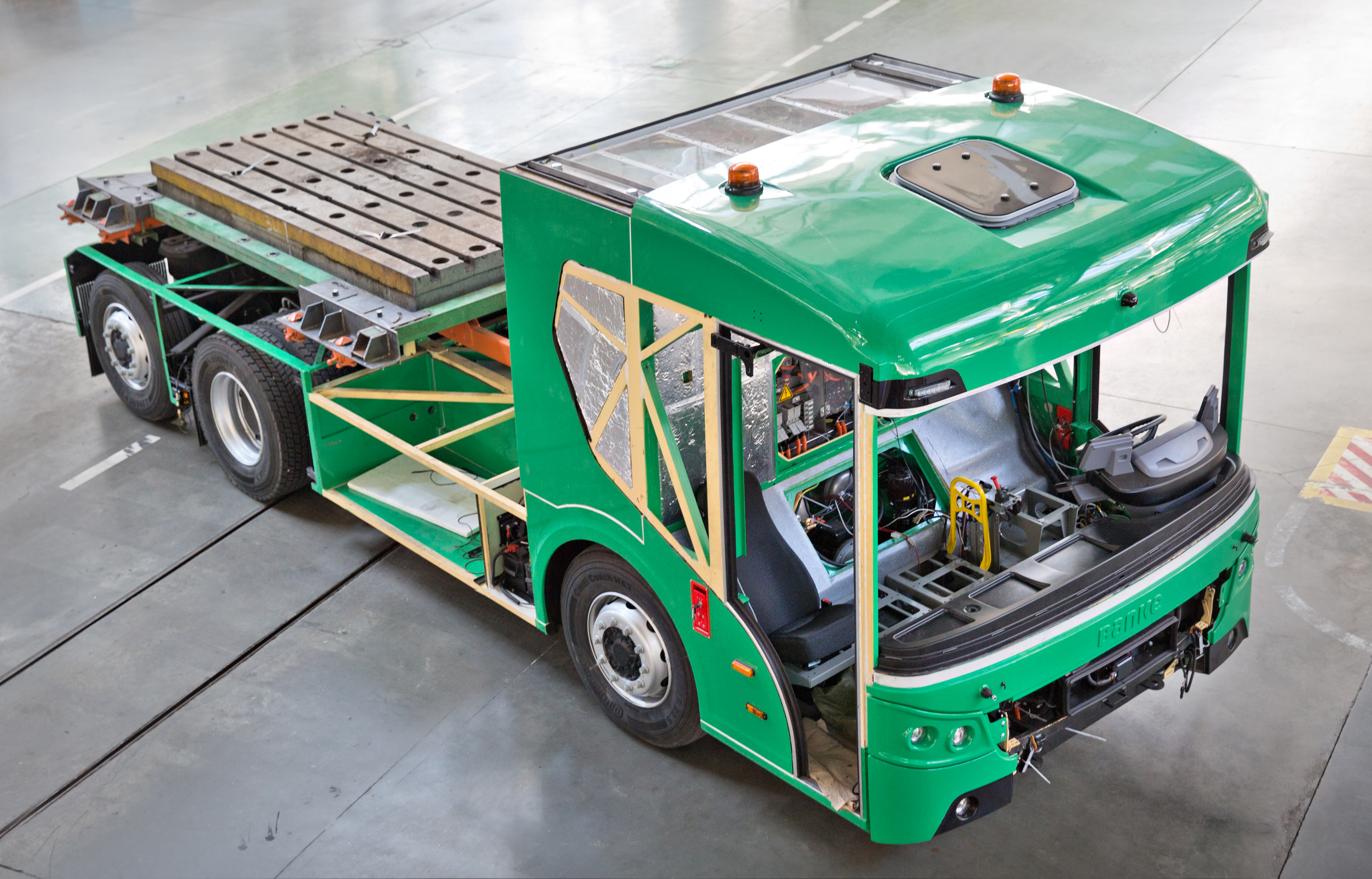
Electric truck ERCV27

In September 2018, "Bogdan Corporation" sent over 100 units of automotive equipment to the Armed Forces of Ukraine under the state defense order. This batch included updated sanitary cars "Bogdan 2251" and trucks "Bogdan 6317". The model "Bogdan 2251" was finalized in cooperation with military doctors at the request of the Ministry of Defense of Ukraine.

In October, “Bogdan” transferred new school buses “Bogdan A22412” to students of Volyn Oblast as a part of the social program “School Bus”. Vehicles comply with the Euro 5 environmental standard and all the safety requirements for the transportation of pupils.

In November 2018, Bogdan Corporation has issued first electric truck ERCV27 for loading solid household waste under a contract with Denmark's Banke Electromotive. Also, this month, "Bogdan" has pre-termed a contract with the Ministry of Defense on the manufacture and supply of sanitary cars Bogdan 2251 to the Armed Forces of Ukraine.

In December 2018 President Petro Poroshenko sent over under the state defense order. Automotive equipment was manufactured at the SE “Car assembly plant #2” in Cherkasy.

In January 2019, Bogdan Motors has won the auction of producing 55 low-floor trolleybuses "Bohdan T90117" for Kyiv. Also, this month, the company signed new contracts with the Ministry of Defense for the supply of updated Bogdan 2251 sanitary cars and Bogdan 6317 trucks to the Armed Forces of Ukraine. Bogdan Motors signed a new agreement with the French company Bluebus for the production of electric buses bodies.

In February 2019, Bogdan Motors won in a tender of producing 57 trolleybus Т7011 with a 105-passenger capacity for Kharkiv.

In March 2019, Bogdan Motors won in a tender for producing 12-meter trolleybuses for Sumy. Also, this month, the company produced the first 18-meter body of an electric bus for the French company Bluebus.

The Economic Court of Dnipropetrovsk Oblast has filed a bankruptcy case against Automobile Company Bogdan Motors JSC on 23 December 2020. On 7 July 2021 the Economic Court of Dnipropetrovsk region has declared the Bogdan Motors automobile company (Kyiv), which is part of the Bogdan corporation, bankrupt and opened the liquidation procedure.

During Russian invasion of Ukraine in 2022 the plant in Lutsk has been taken over by Bogdan's former dealer Bus Motor and continued to operate despite the bankruptcy producing school buses and bodies for French BlueBus.

In September 2024 former LuAZ was sold to Dream Town residential complex owned by Euroholding construction company.

== Description ==
The facilities of Bogdan Corporation allow producing 120-150 thousands of cars, up to 9 000 buses and trolleybuses of all types, and around 15 thousand cargo trucks and specialized equipment a year. Facilities are located in Lutsk and Cherkasy.

== Gallery of production ==
=== Cars and trucks ===
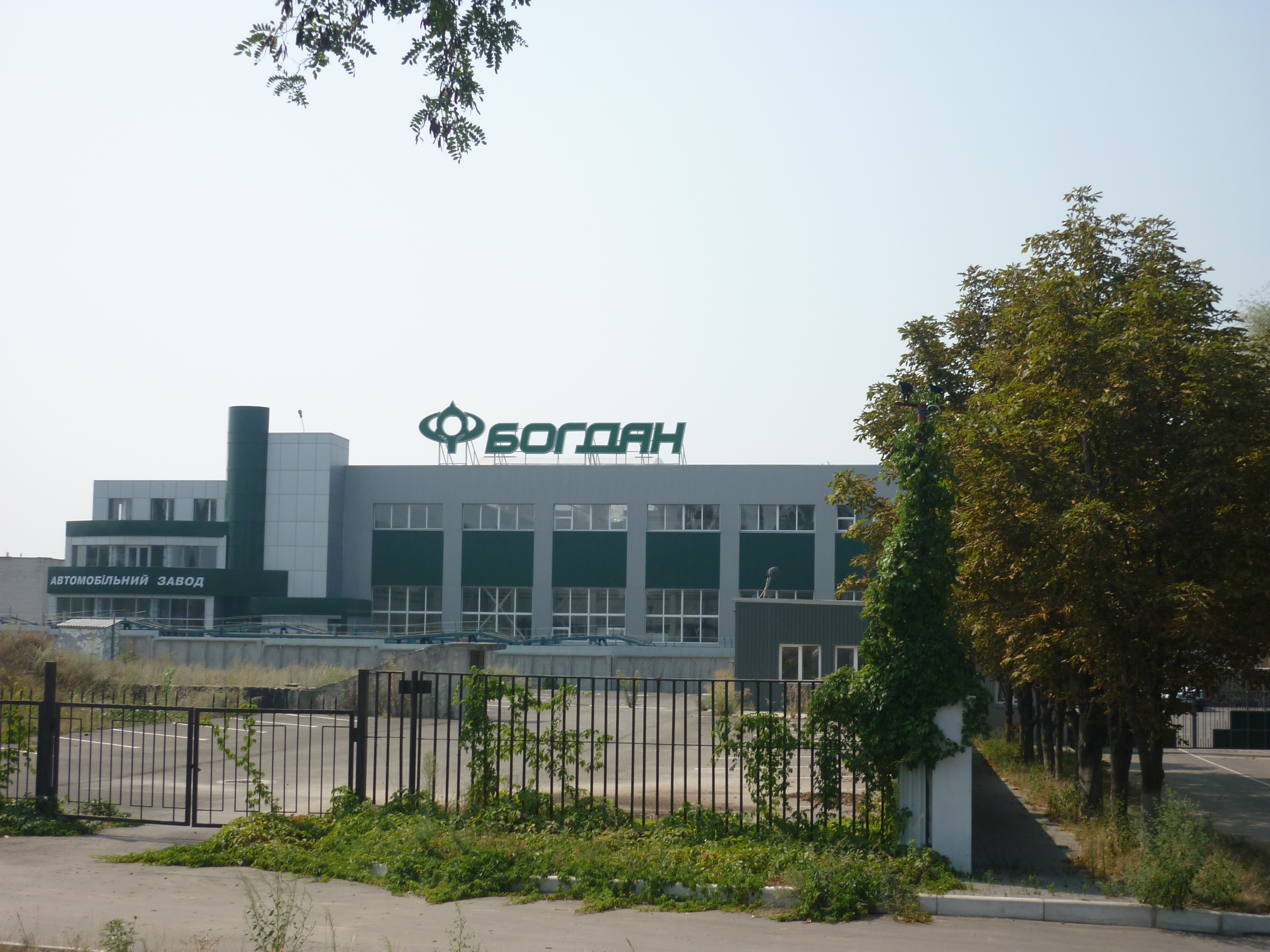
Cherkasy automobile plant "Bogdan" (trucks)

Cars and trucks are produced or assembled in Cherkasy. The facilities in Cherkasy are the most modern auto-manufacturing facilities in Ukraine. Car manufacturing launched in 2000. Cherkasy plant allows to produce 120,000-150,000 cars per year. The plant produces/assembles Bogdan 2110, Bogdan 2111, Bogdan 2310 (pick-up), Hyundai Accent, Hyundai Tucson, Hyundai Elantra XD and JAC J5

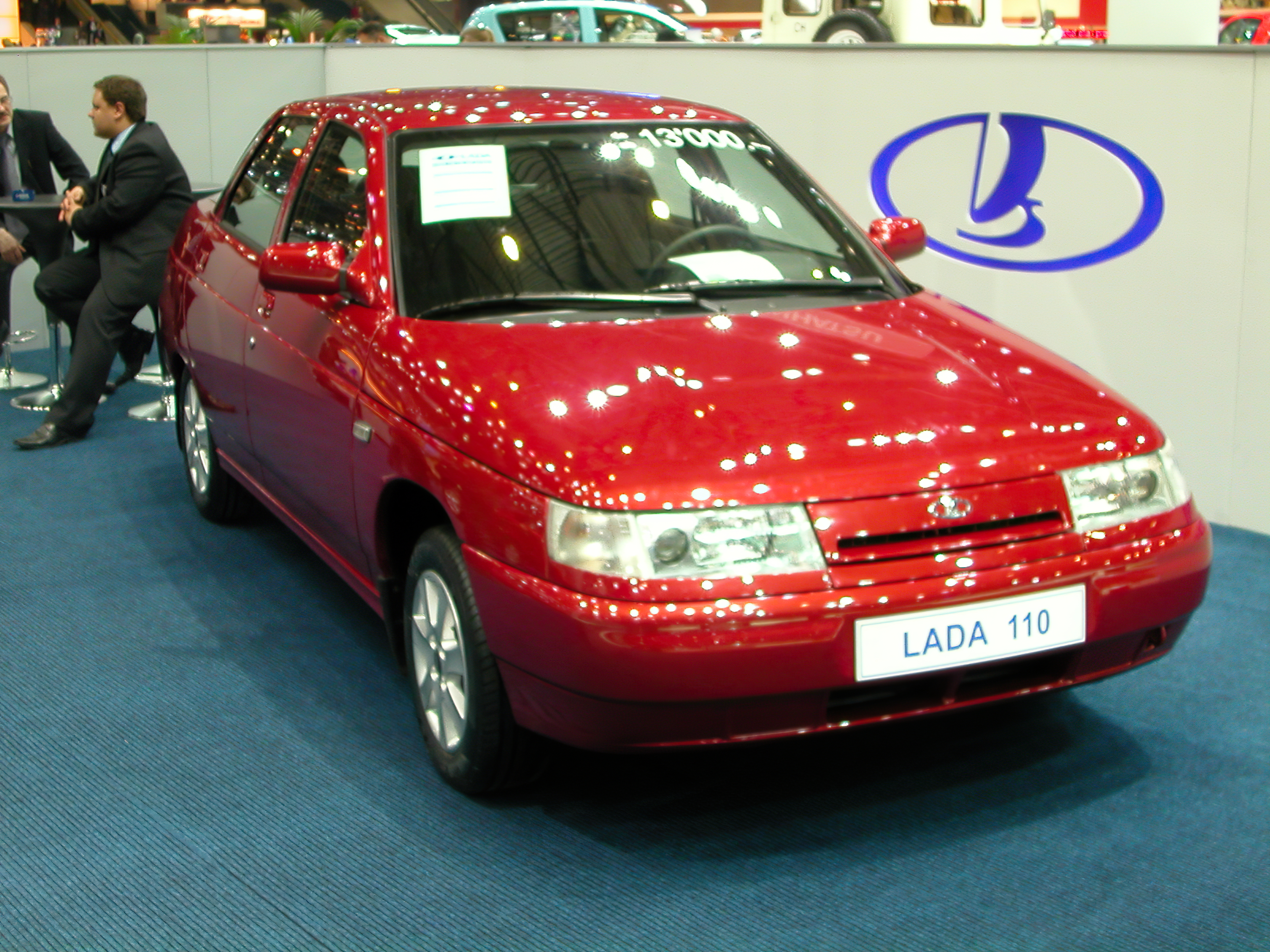
Bogdan 2110

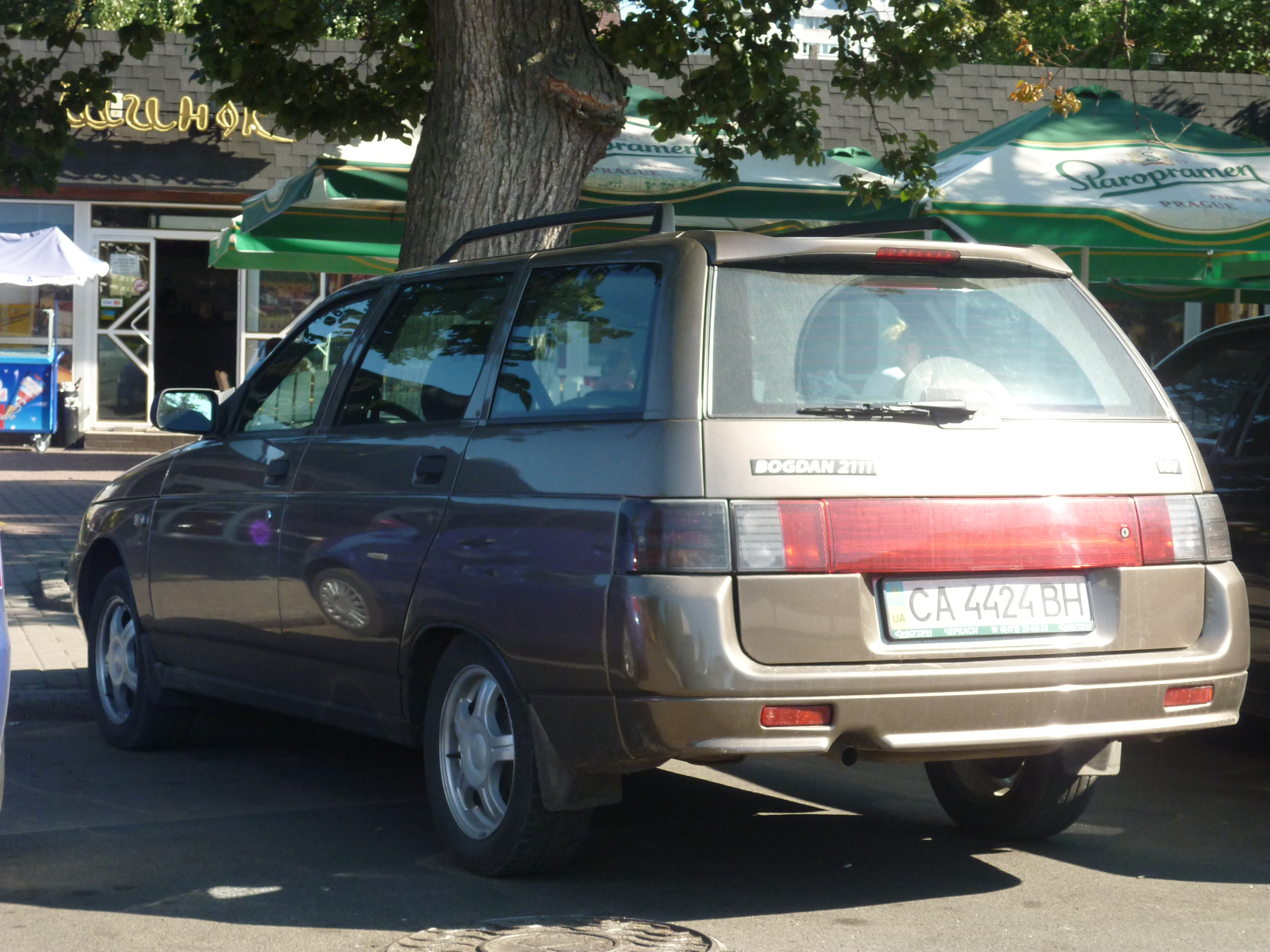
Bogdan 2111

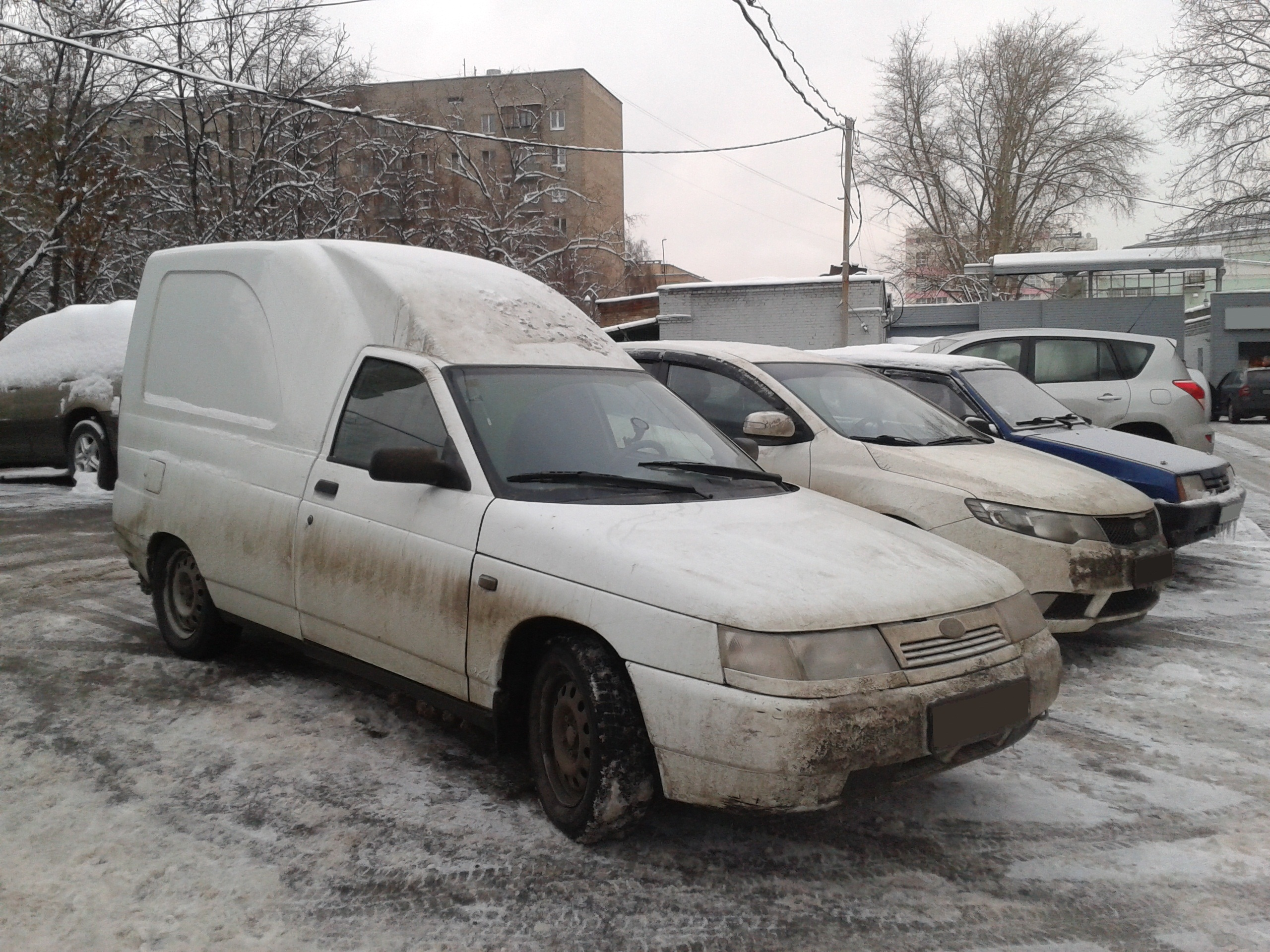
Bogdan-2310

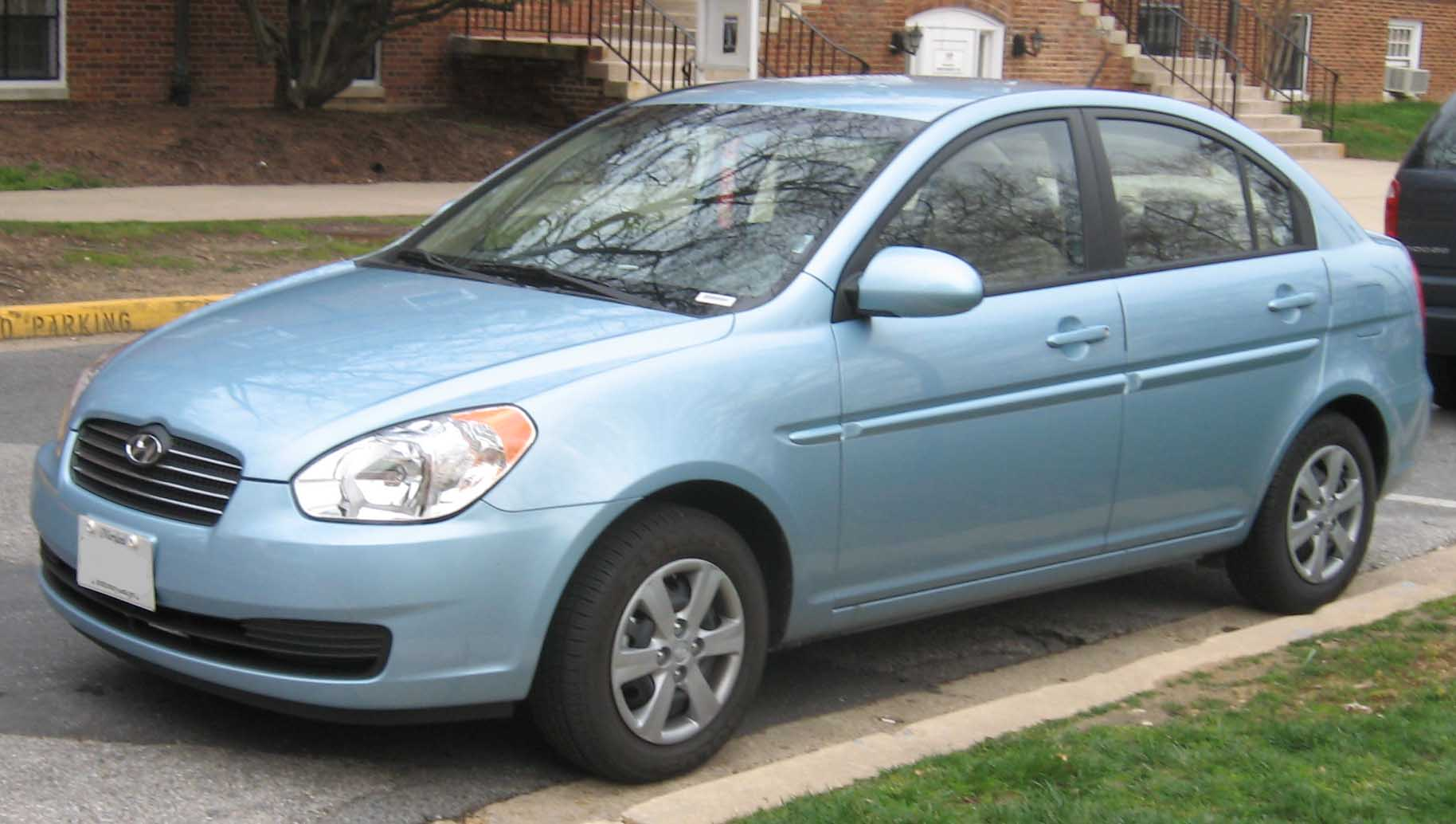
Hyundai Accent

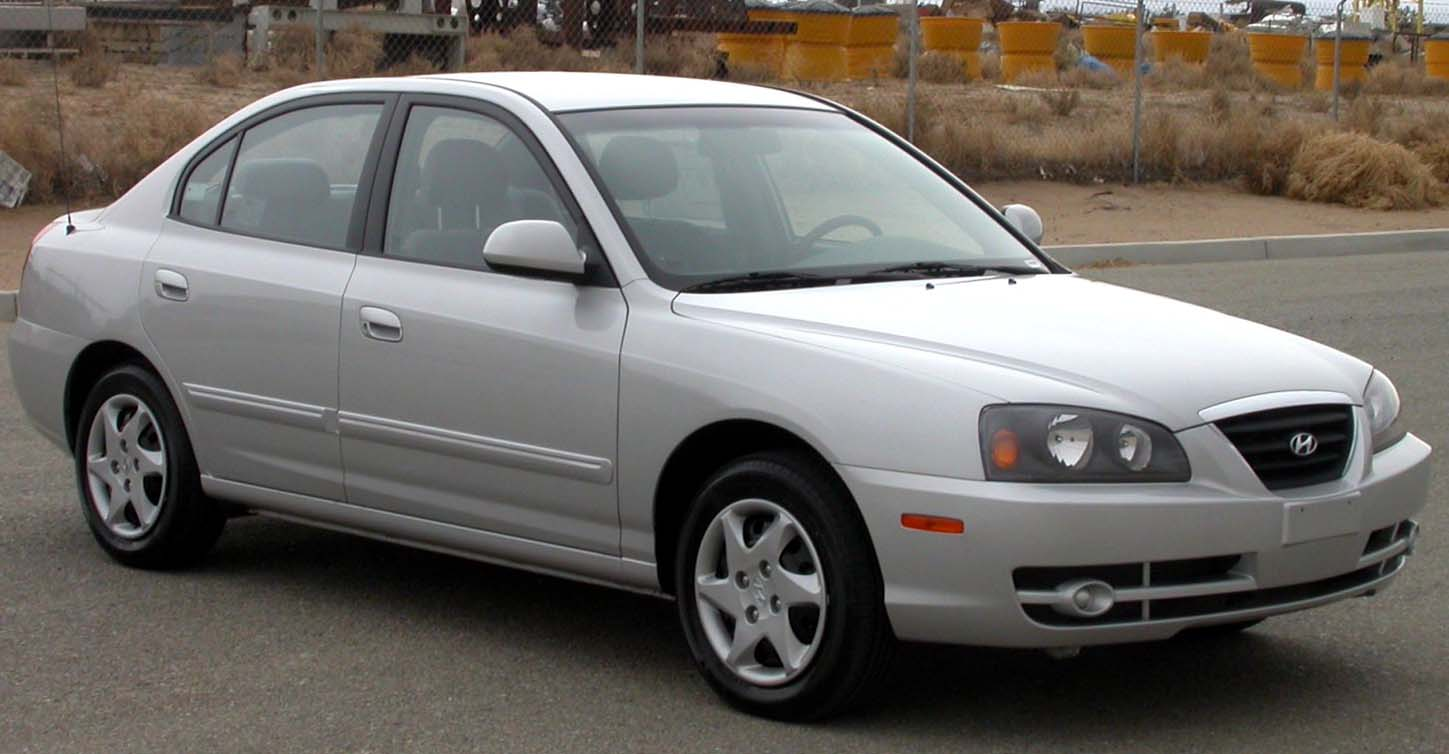
Hyundai Elantra XD

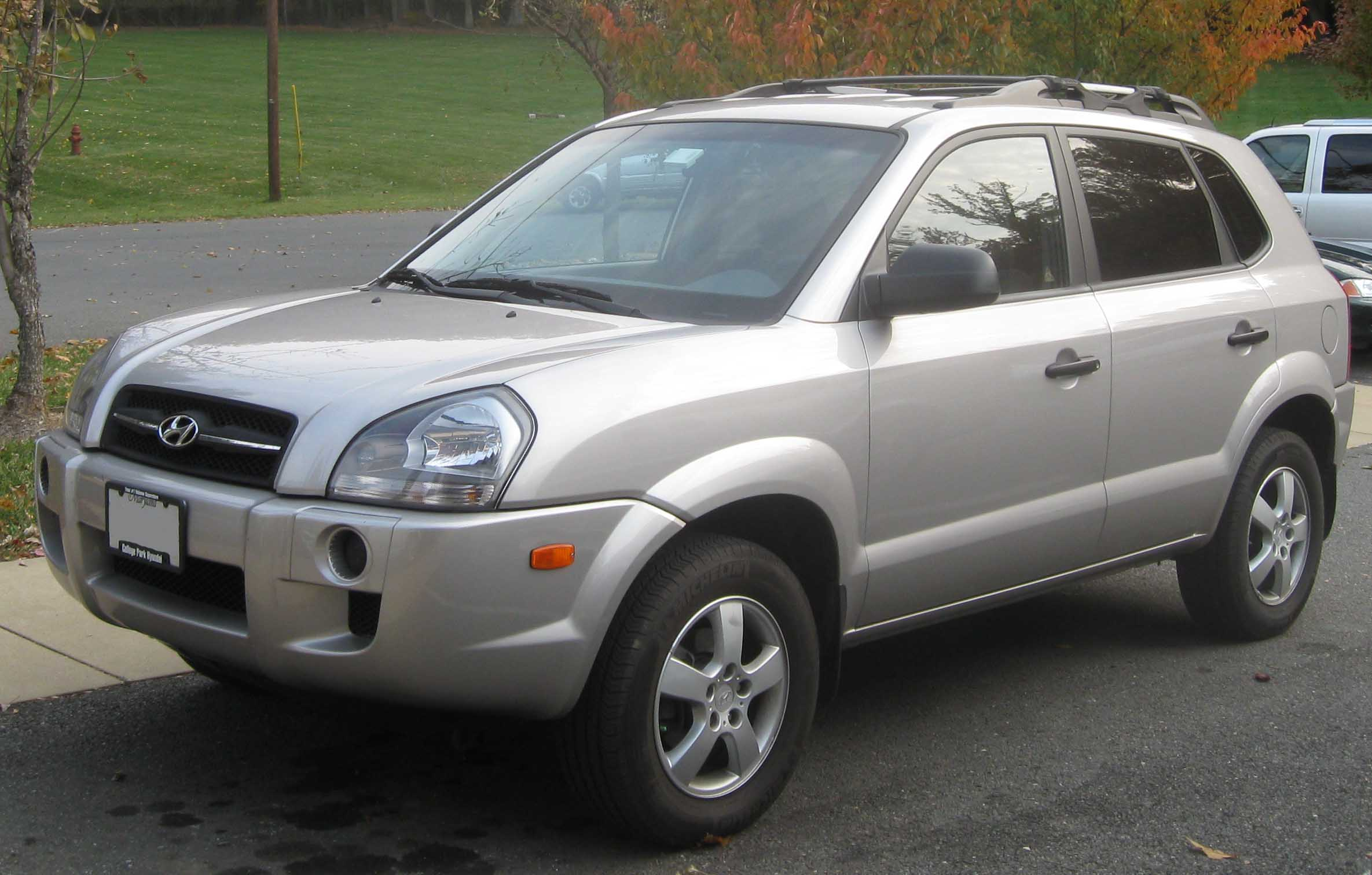
Hyundai Tucson

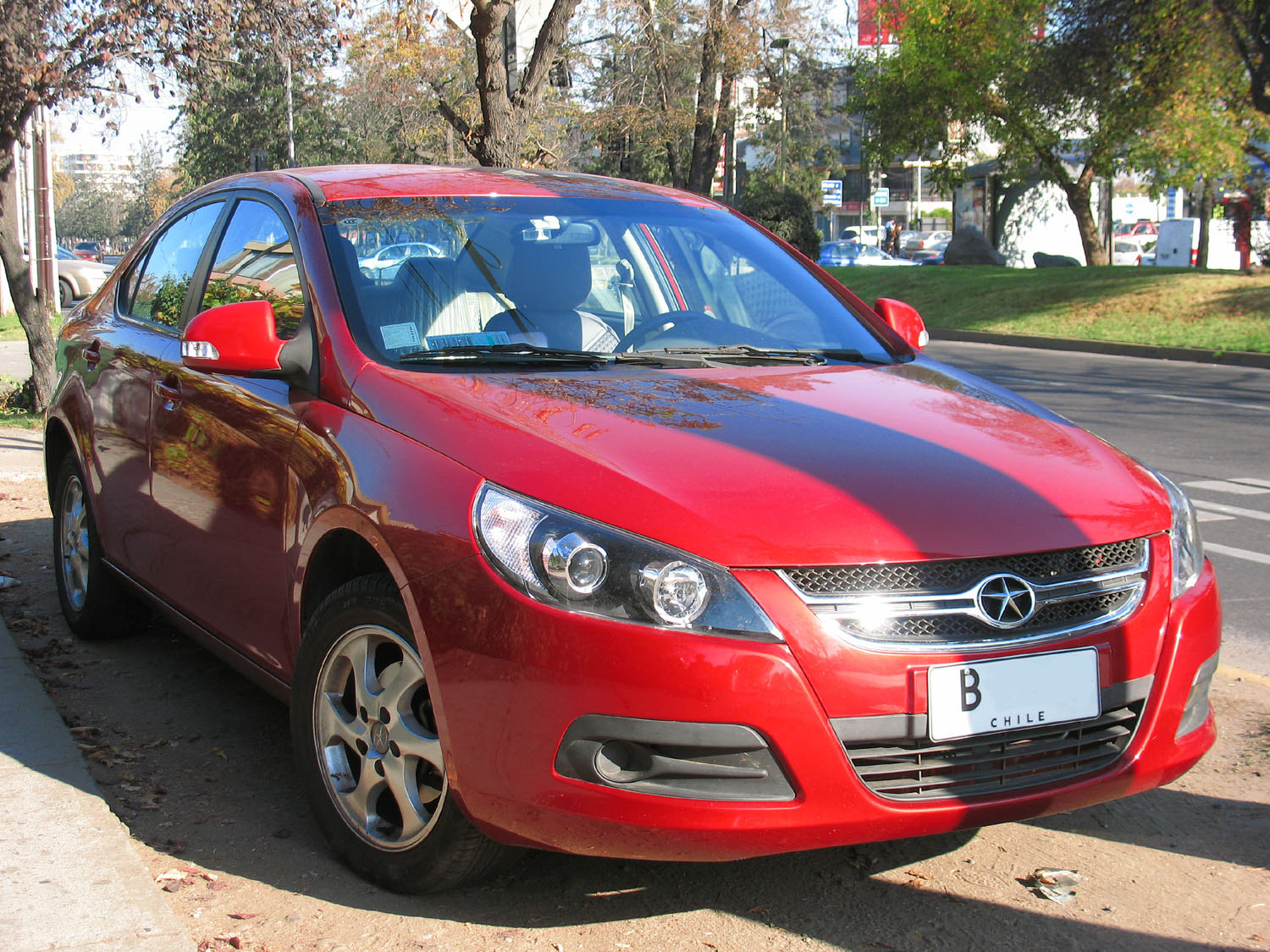
JAC J5

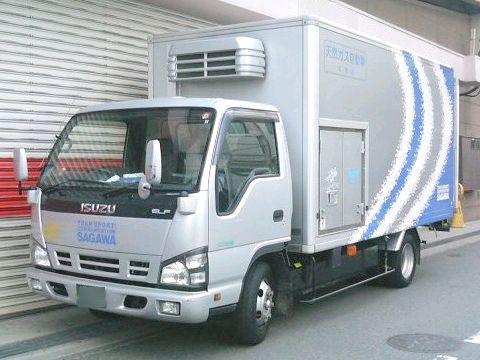
Isuzu N-series

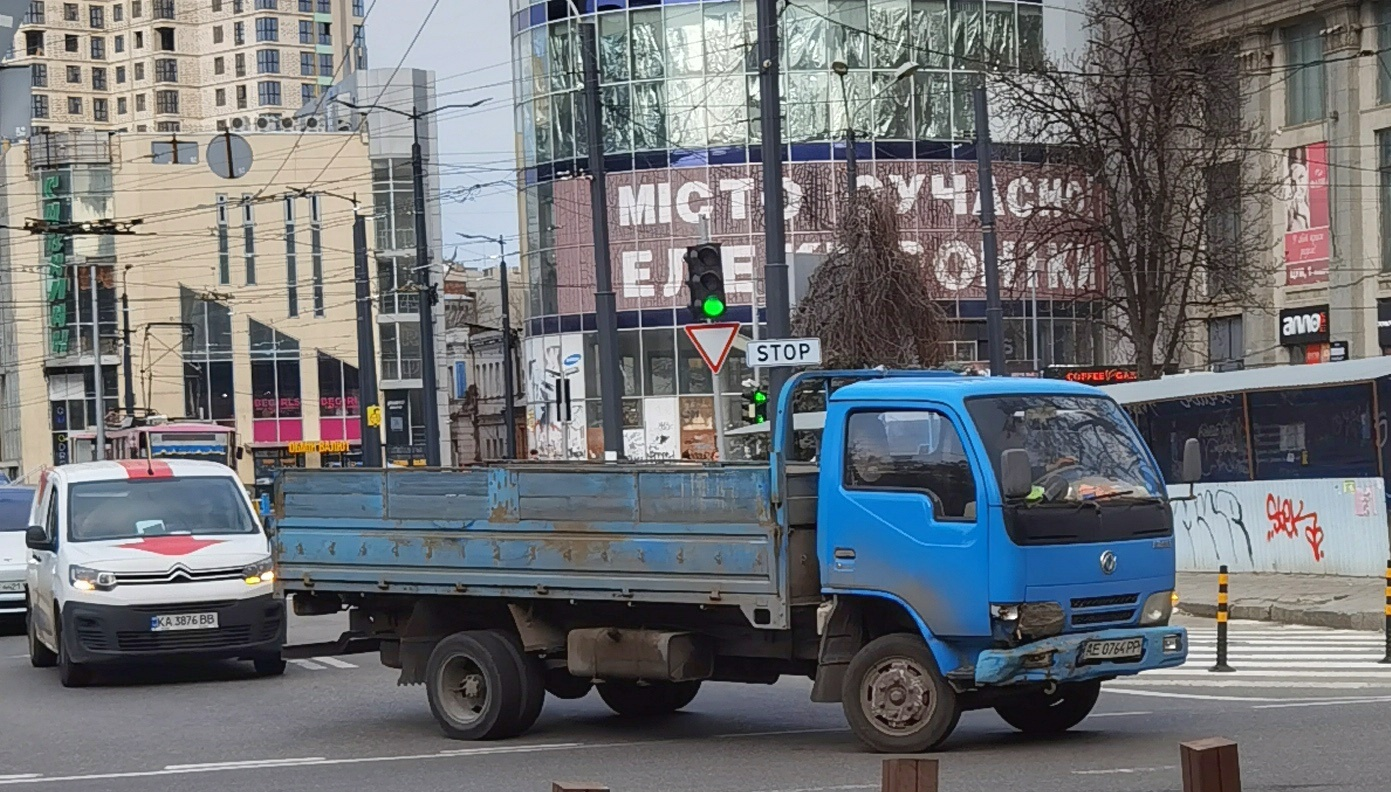
Bogdan DF-25

=== Buses and trolleybuses ===
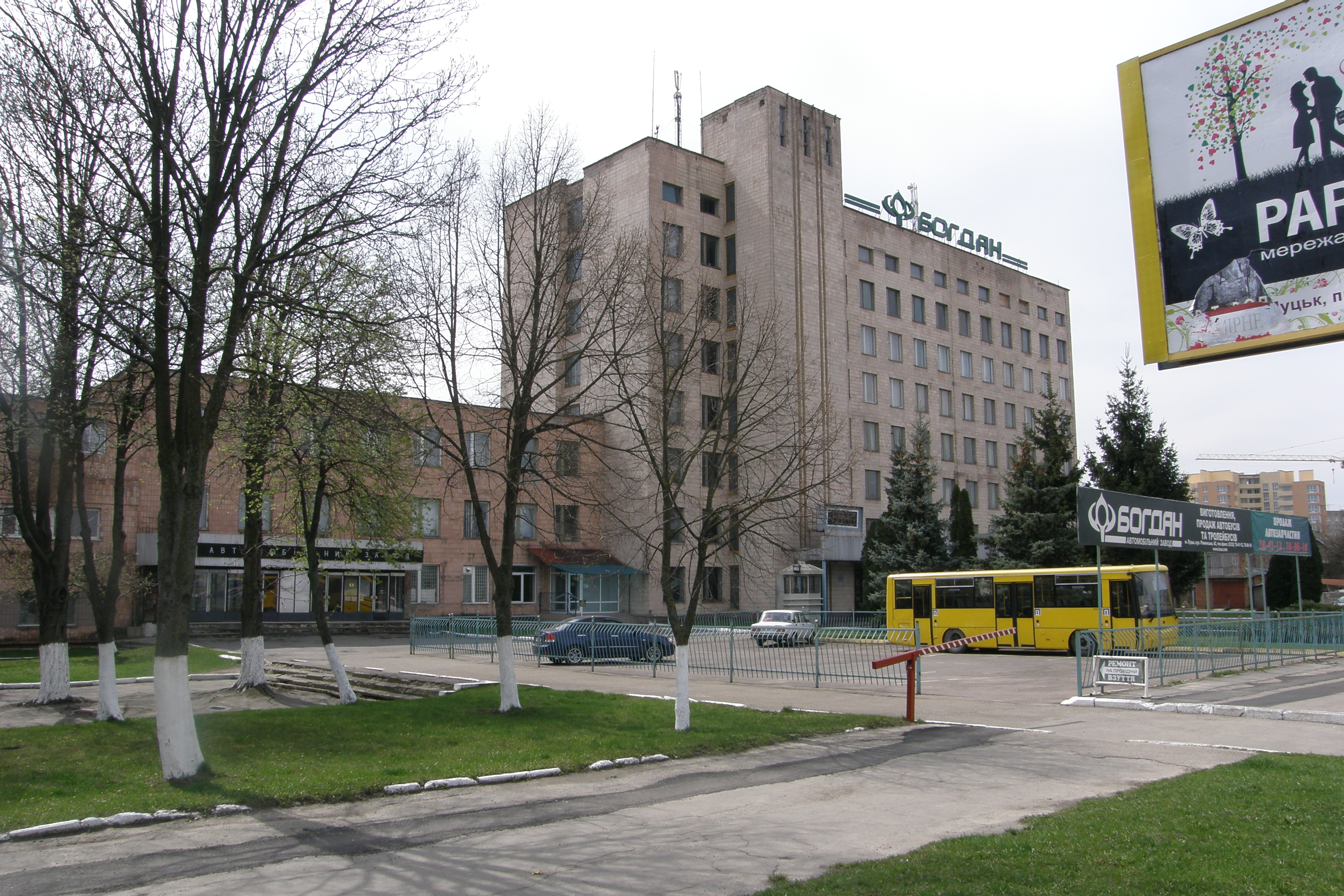
Auto assembly plant No.1 "Bogdan Motors" (former LuAZ) in Lutsk

Buses mostly produced in Cherkasy while trolleybuses are manufactured in Lutsk. A bus "Bogdan" is the most widespread used small bus for city transportation in most Ukrainian cities. Facilities located in Cherkasy allow to produce up to 3000 buses a year along with cars and trucks production. The plant in Lutsk formerly known as LuAZ now manufactures buses and trolleybuses branded as "Bogdan". Maximum capacity of Lutsk plant is 8000 buses and trolleybuses a year.

- Small buses
  - A064 (2004–2005)
  - A067 (2005–2006)
  - A069 (2006–2013)
- Medium buses
  - A091 (1999—2005)
  - A092 (2003–2012)
  - A301 (2006–2009)
  - A201 (2011–2020)
- Big buses
  - A144 (2003–2012, 2020–2021)
  - A701 (2011–2020)
- Intercity buses
  - A401 (2008–2011)
- School buses
  - AX071 (2004–2005)
  - A224 (2020–2024)
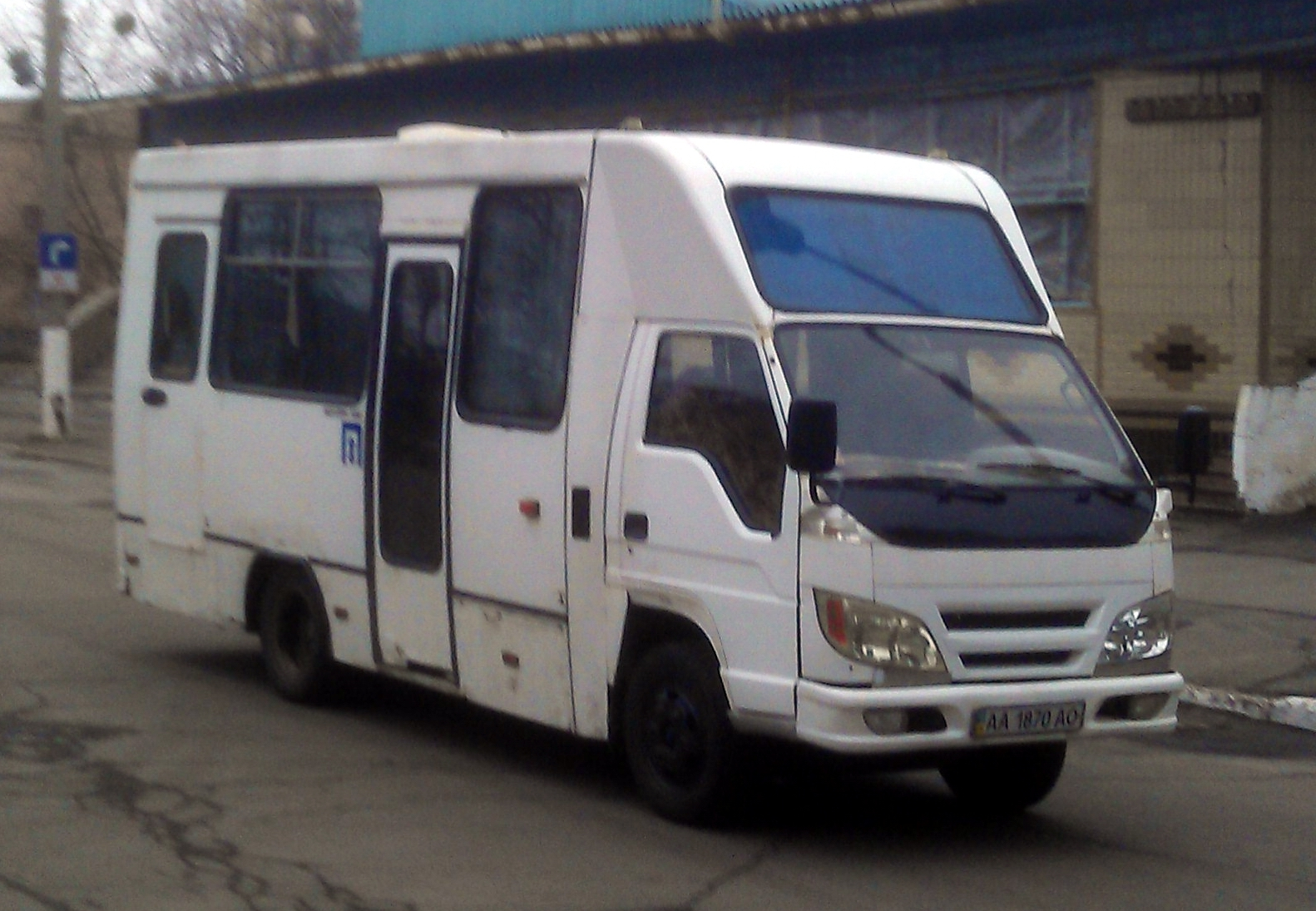
Bogdan A067 (2005–2006)

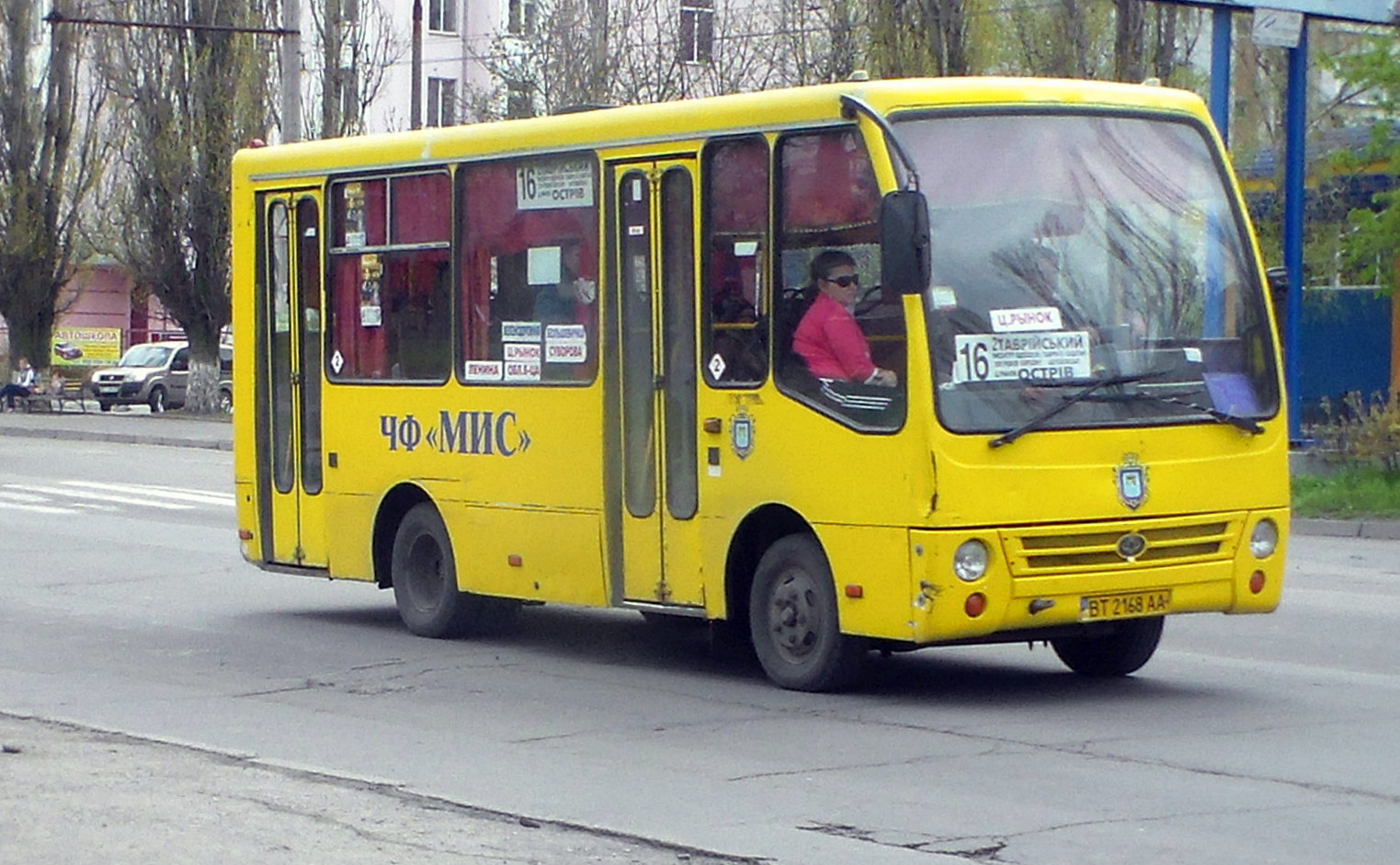
Bogdan A069 (2006–2013)

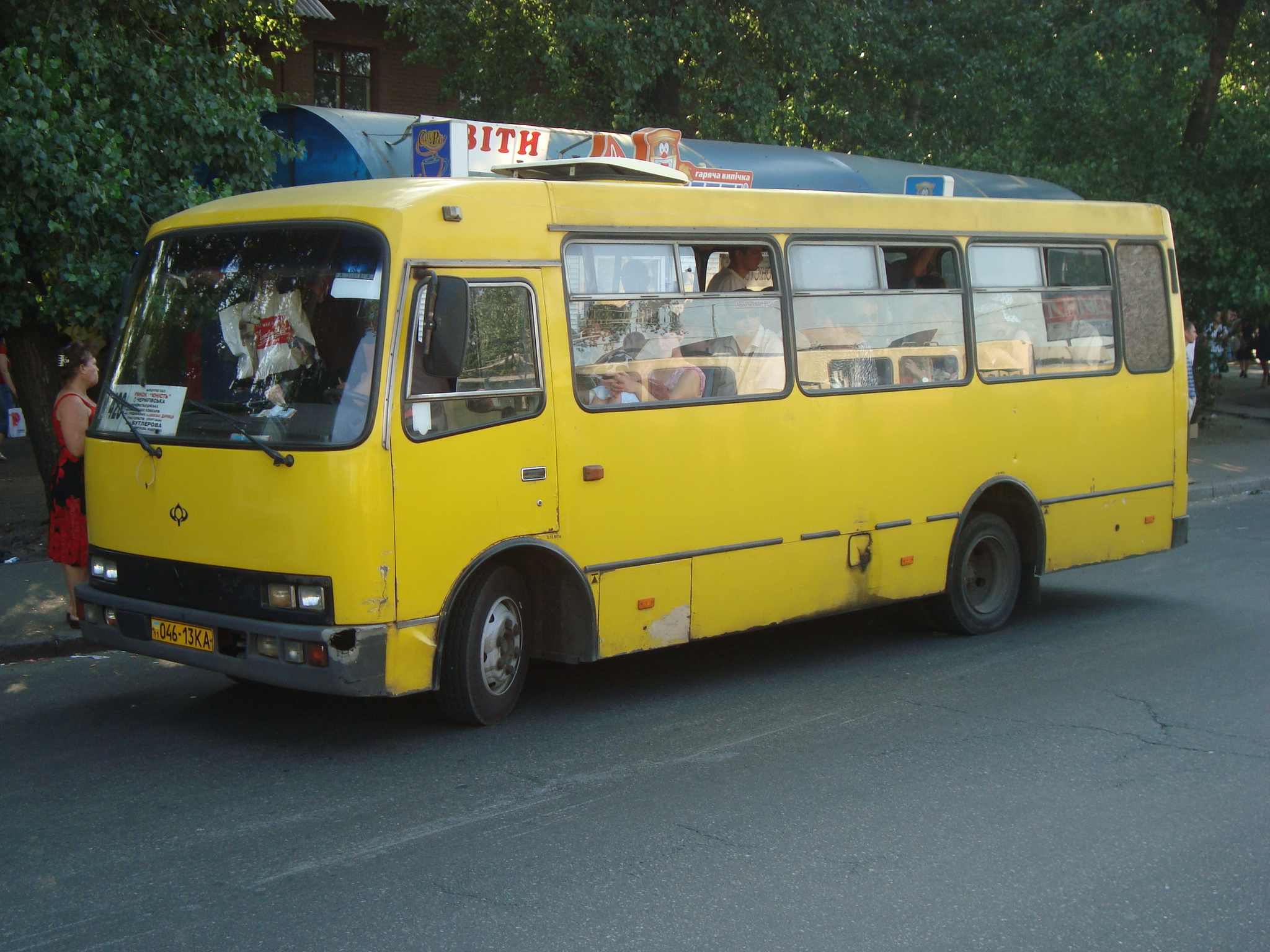
Bogdan A091 (1999—2005)

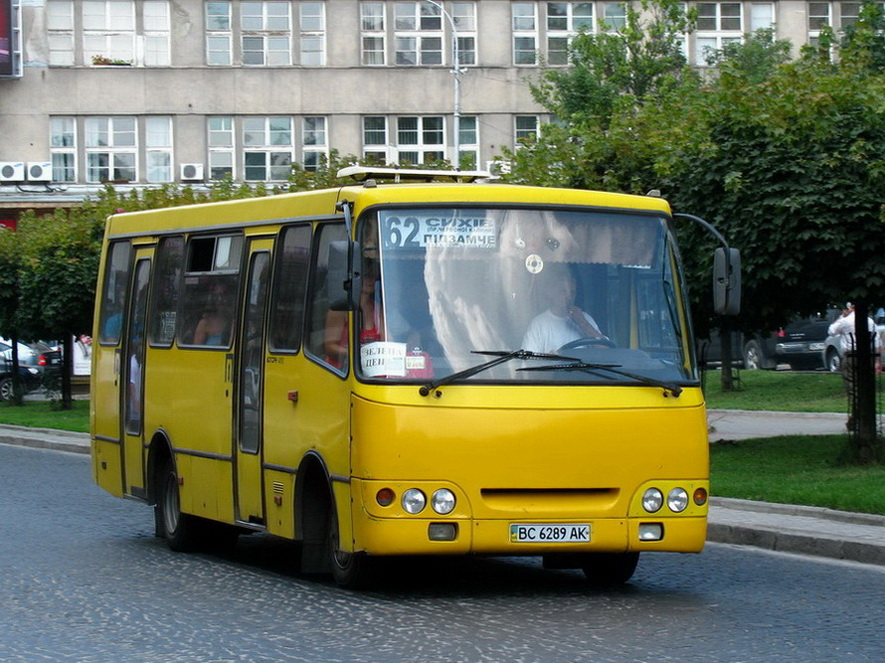
Bogdan A092 (2003–2012)

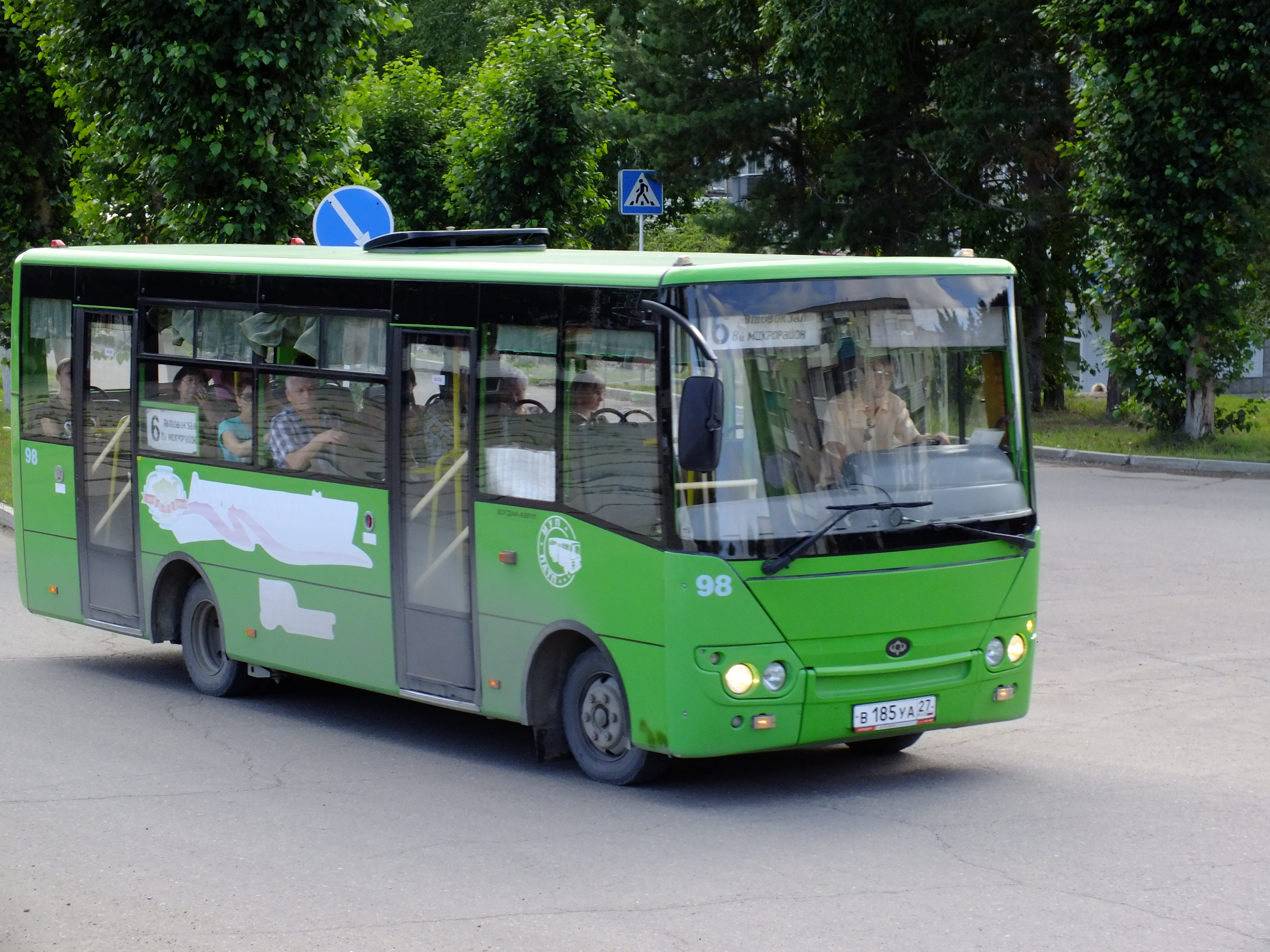
Bogdan A201 (2011–present)

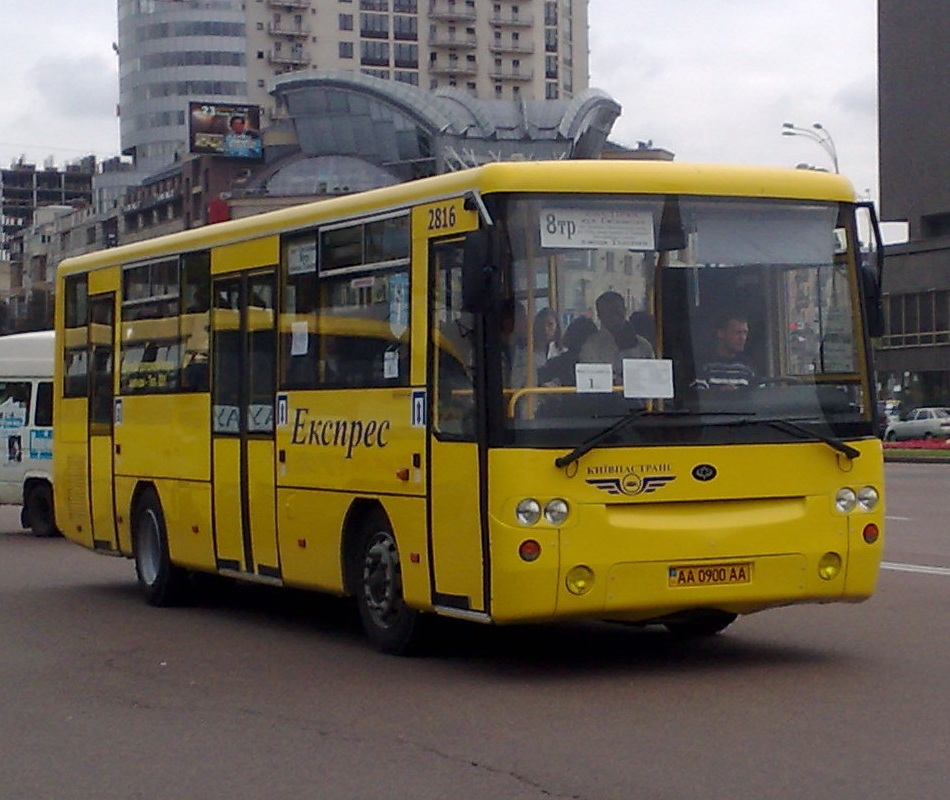
Bogdan A144 (2003–2008)

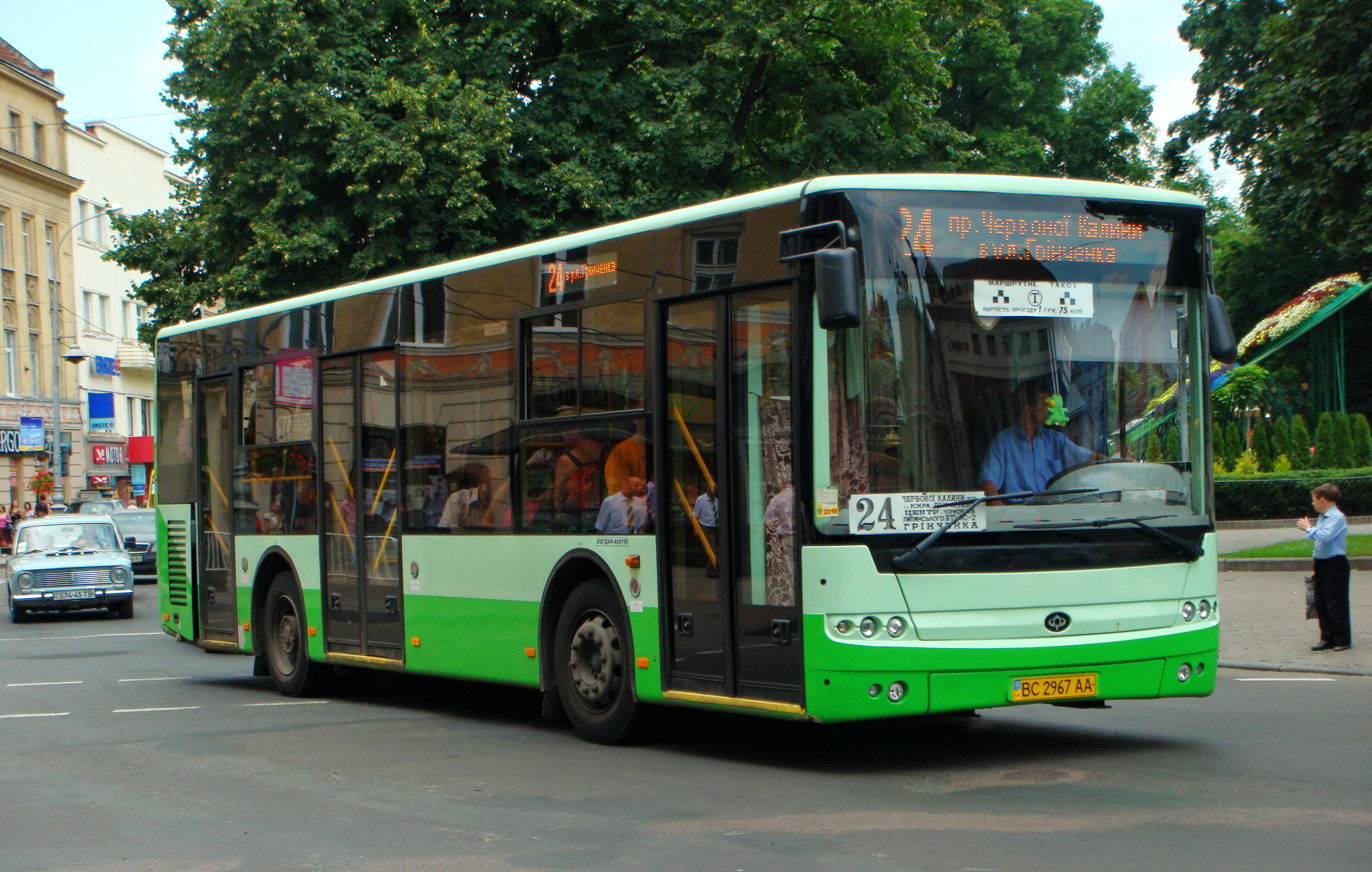
Bogdan A701 (2011–present)

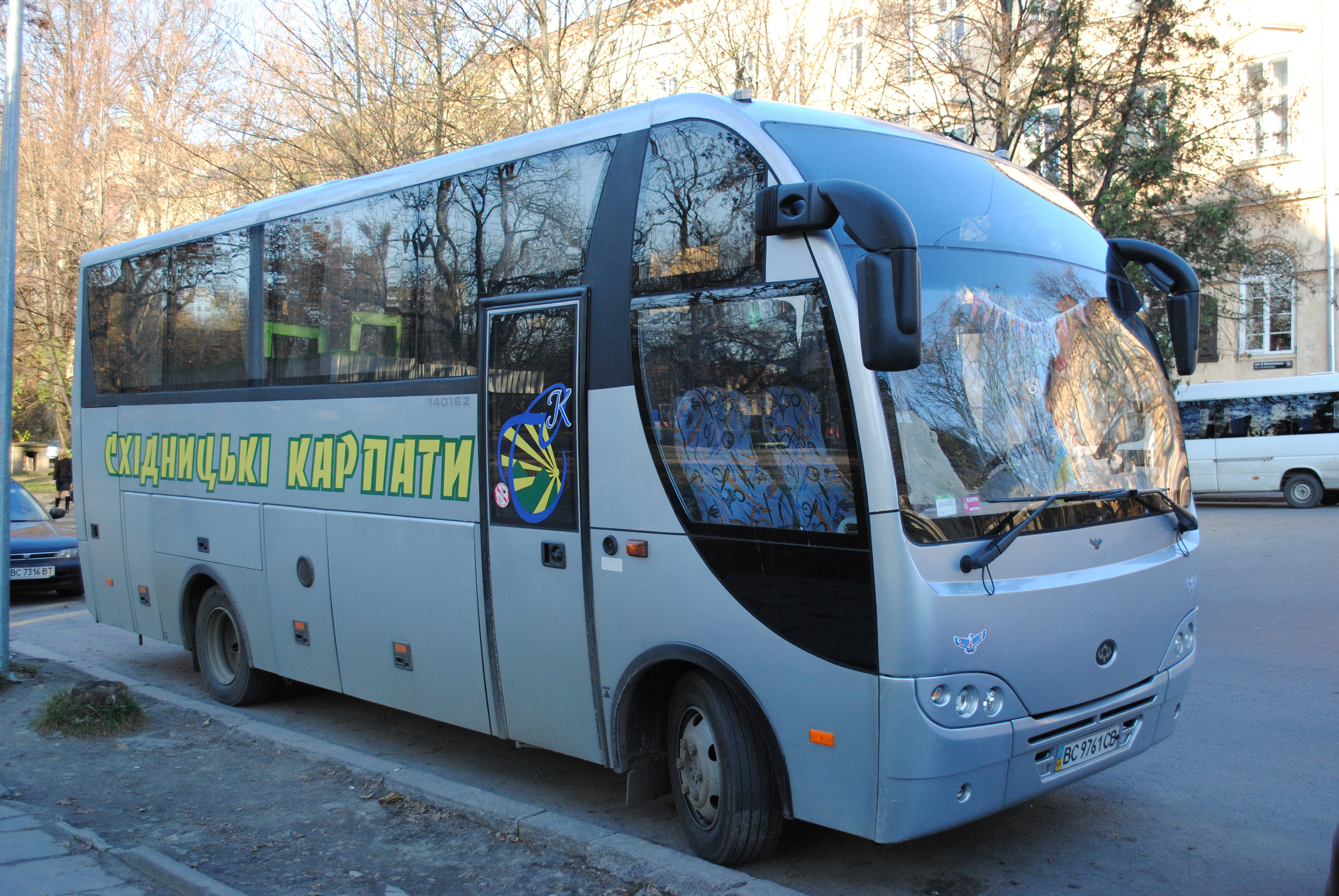
Bogdan A401 (2008–2011)

=== Military and special vehicles ===
Vehicles, designed for military applications, are produced at car assembly plants, owned by Automobile Company “Bogdan Motors”, located in Lutsk and Cherkasy.

The following models can be mentioned among products, designed for military applications: Bars-6 and Bars-8 tactical armored vehicles, Kia Military KM-450 multi-purpose truck, flatbed truck based on Great Wall Wingle 5, ambulance vehicle based on Great Wall Wingle 5, Hyundai HD 65/78 truck, Hyundai HD 120 truck, Bogdan 5316, Bogdan 2351, Bogdan 6317 and Bogdan 6425 trucks.

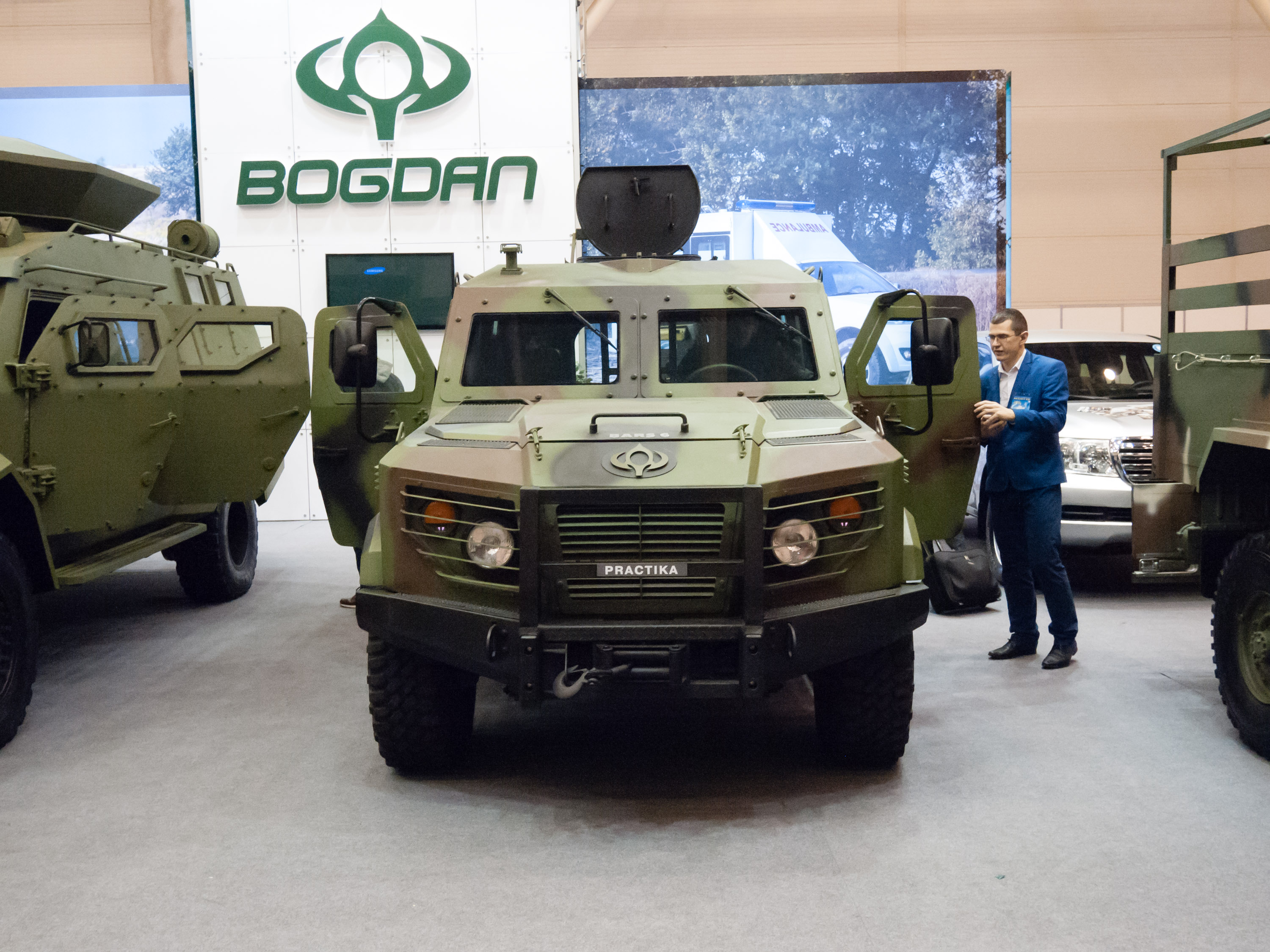
Bogdan Bars-6 (serial)

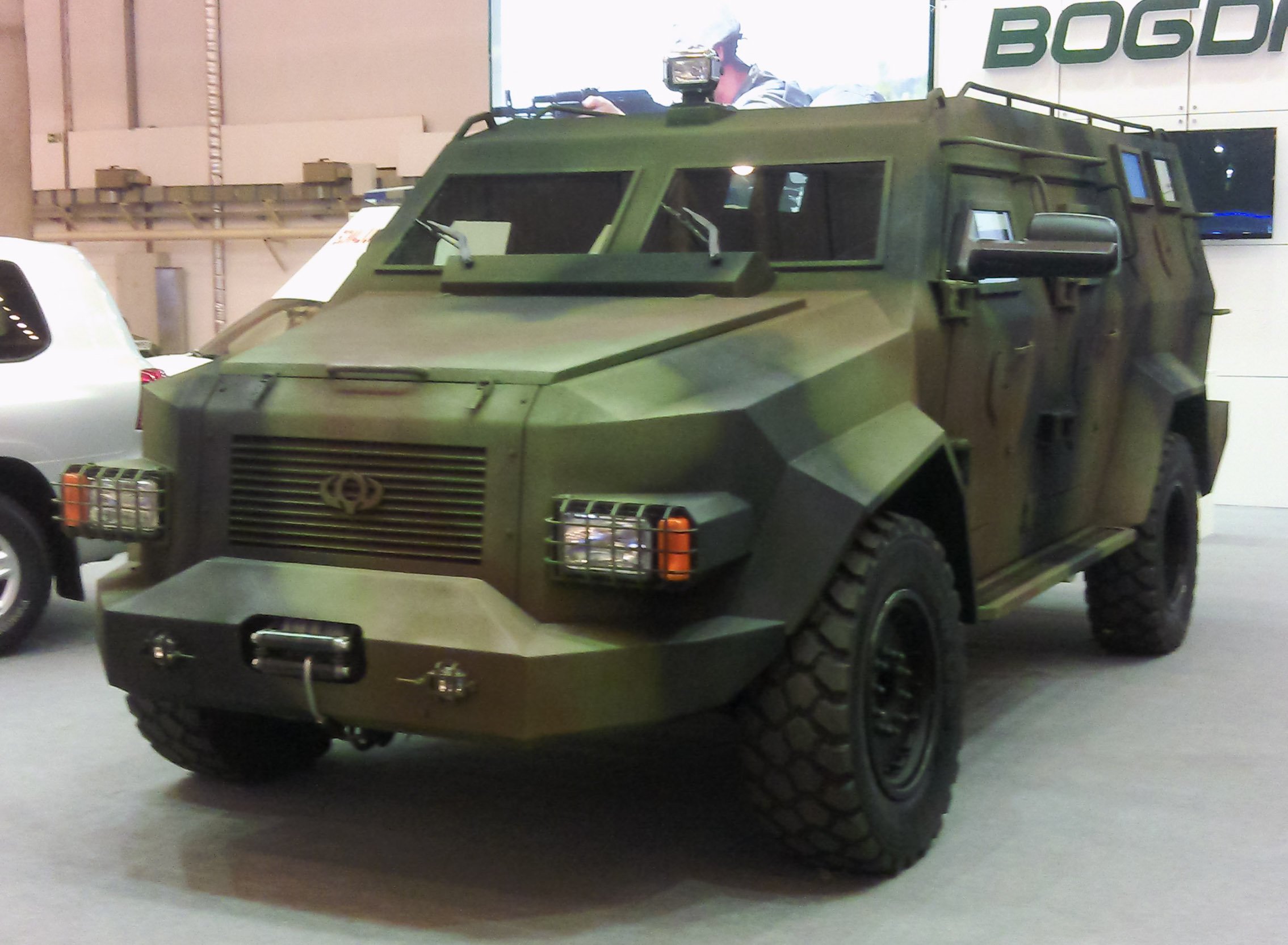
Bogdan Bars-8 (prototype)

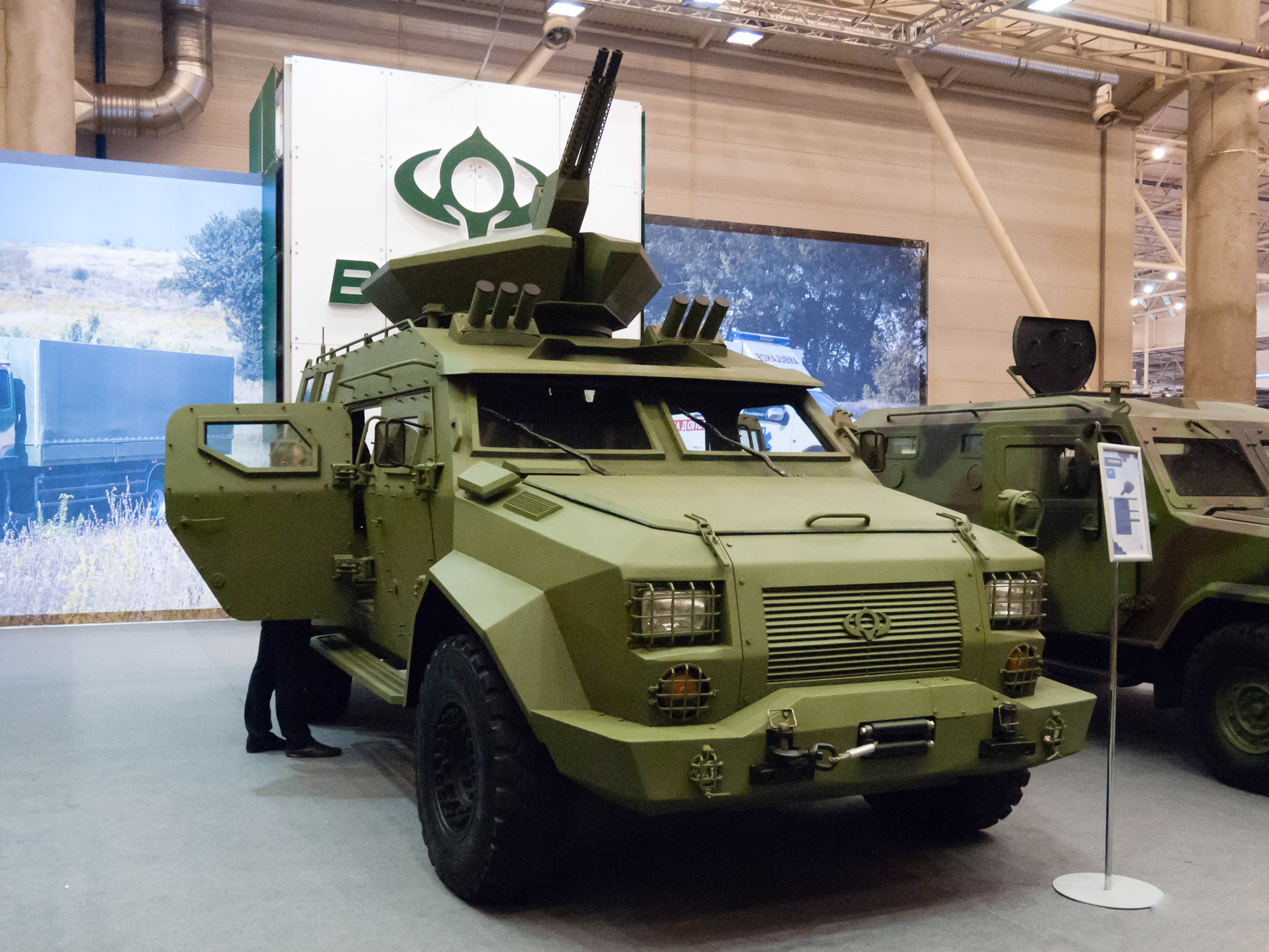
Bogdan Bars-8 (serial)

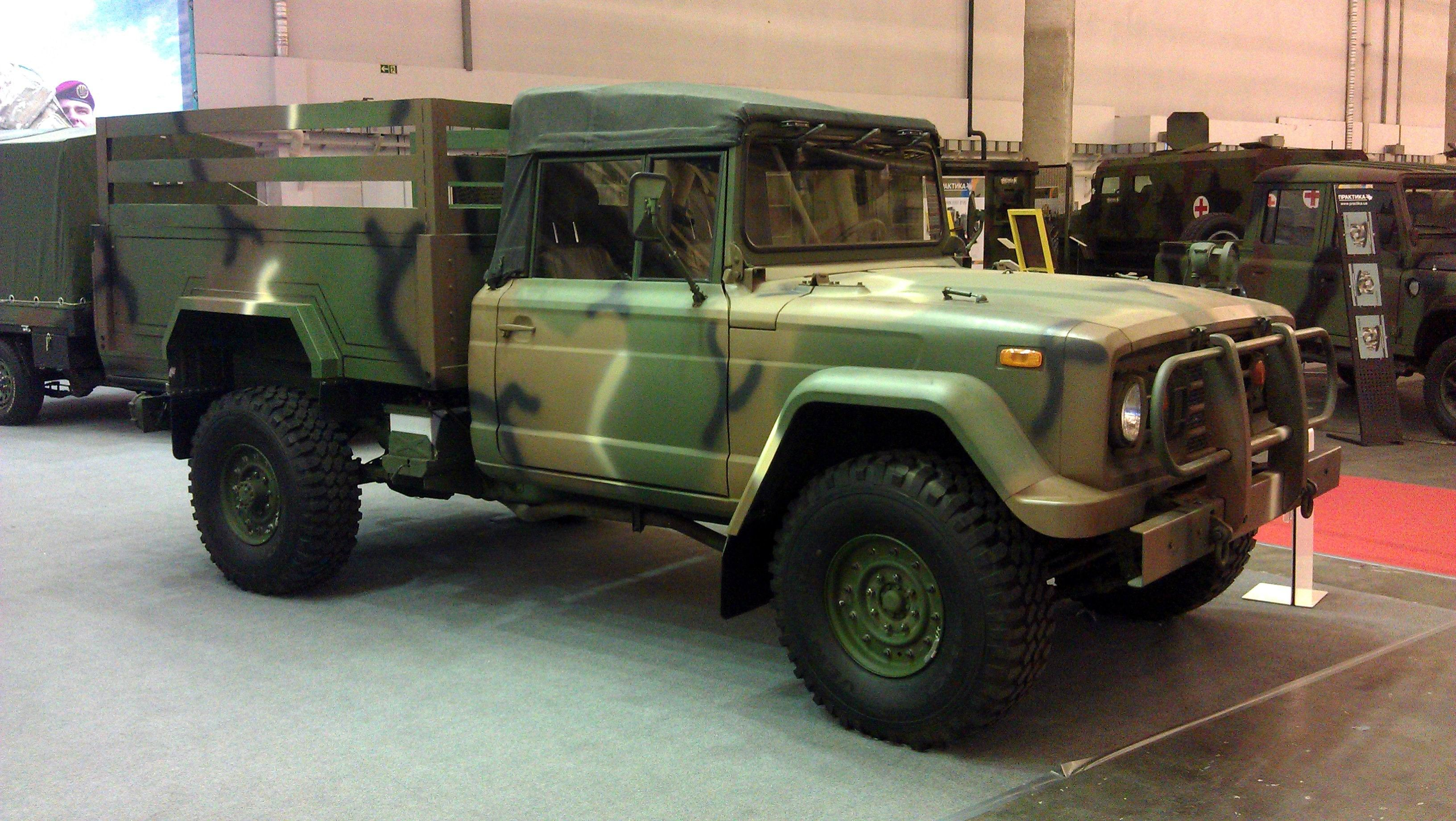
Bogdan-KIA Military KM-450

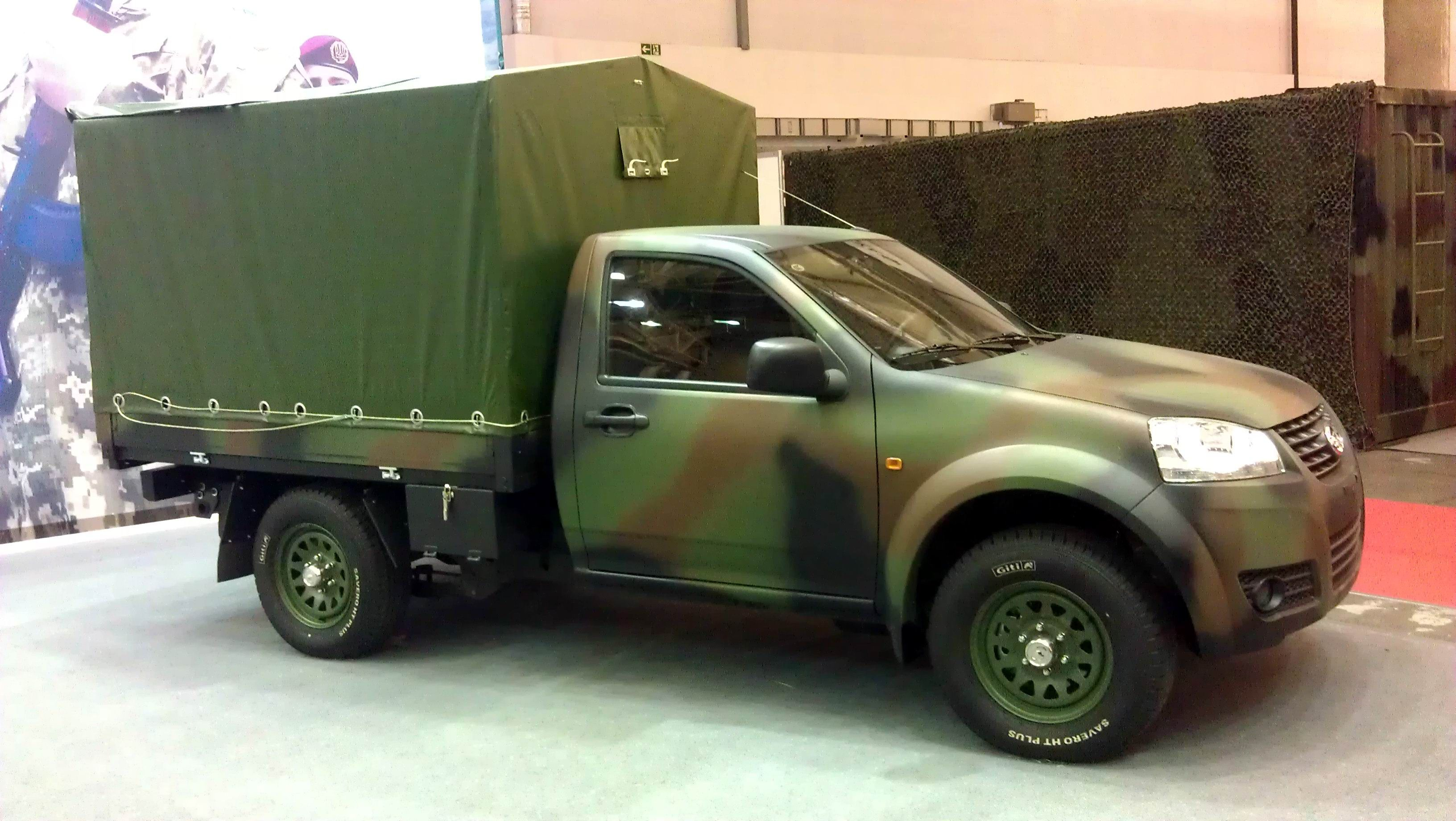
A Great Wall Wingle 5 military truck

== List of models ==
- Sedan
  - Bogdan 2110 (2009–2014)
- Wagon
  - Bogdan 2111 (2009–2014)
- Pickup
  - Bogdan 2310 (2009–2014)
  - Bogdan 2351 (2018–present)
- Small bus
  - Bogdan A064 (2004–2005)
  - Bogdan A067 (2005–2006)
  - Bogdan A069 (2005–2013)
  - Bogdan A301 (2006–2007)
  - Tur A049 (2010–2011)
- Medium bus
  - Bogdan A091 (1999–2011)
  - Bogdan A092 (2003–2012)
  - Bogdan A201 (2011–2014)
- Big bus
  - Bogdan A144 (2003–2005)
  - Bogdan A401 (2009–2011)
  - Bogdan A701 (2011–present)
- Extra big bus
  - Bogdan A231 (2003–2004)
  - Bogdan A801 (2008–2012)
- Trolleybus
  - Bogdan E231 (2007–2008)
  - Bogdan T701 (2011–present)
  - Bogdan T901 (2011–present)
- School bus
  - Bogdan AX071 (2004–2005)
- Truck
  - Bogdan 6317 (2016–present)
- Military vehicles
  - Bars-6 (2016–present)
  - Bars-8 (2016–present)
