= Bogdan-2351 =

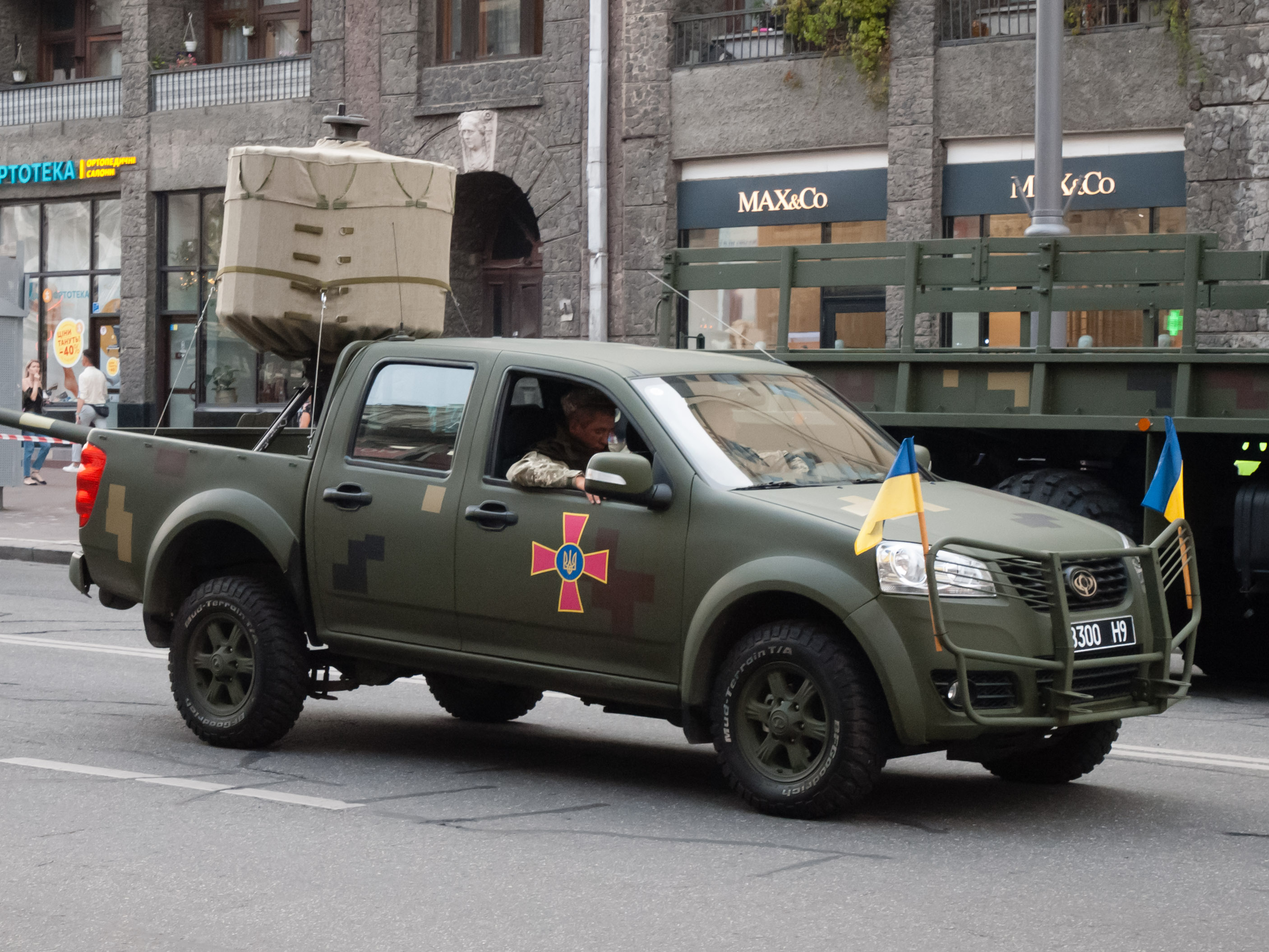
- Bogdan-2351 in 2018
- Type: Pickup truck, Military light utility vehicle
- Place of origin: Ukraine

Production history
- Manufacturer: Bogdan
- Produced: 2016–present

Specifications
- Armour: None
- Suspension: 4x4

The Bogdan-2351 is a pickup truck produced by Bogdan since 2016. It is based on components and assemblies of the Great Wall Wingle 5. A military version of the model is produced for the Armed Forces of Ukraine.

== Specifications ==
The Bogdan-2351 is intended for transporting soldiers and small-tonnage cargo on roads with any surface. It is based on the Chinese pickup truck Great Wall Wingle. The vehicle uses a double cab, and has a capacity of 5 people, including the driver. The bed of the Bogdan-2351 can be fitted with an AN-TPQ-48 counter-battery radar, designed to detect enemy mortars. A bull bar is installed in front. For use in the army, the vehicle is equipped with leaf spring suspension and tires with special tread patterns. There is a universal light switch on the dashboard, which allows the vehicle to be camouflaged. The vehicle can also tow trailers with a gross weight of 1.5 to 3 tons, depending on the braking system.

There is also an ambulance Bogdan-2251.
