= Bogdan Bars-8 =

Bars-8
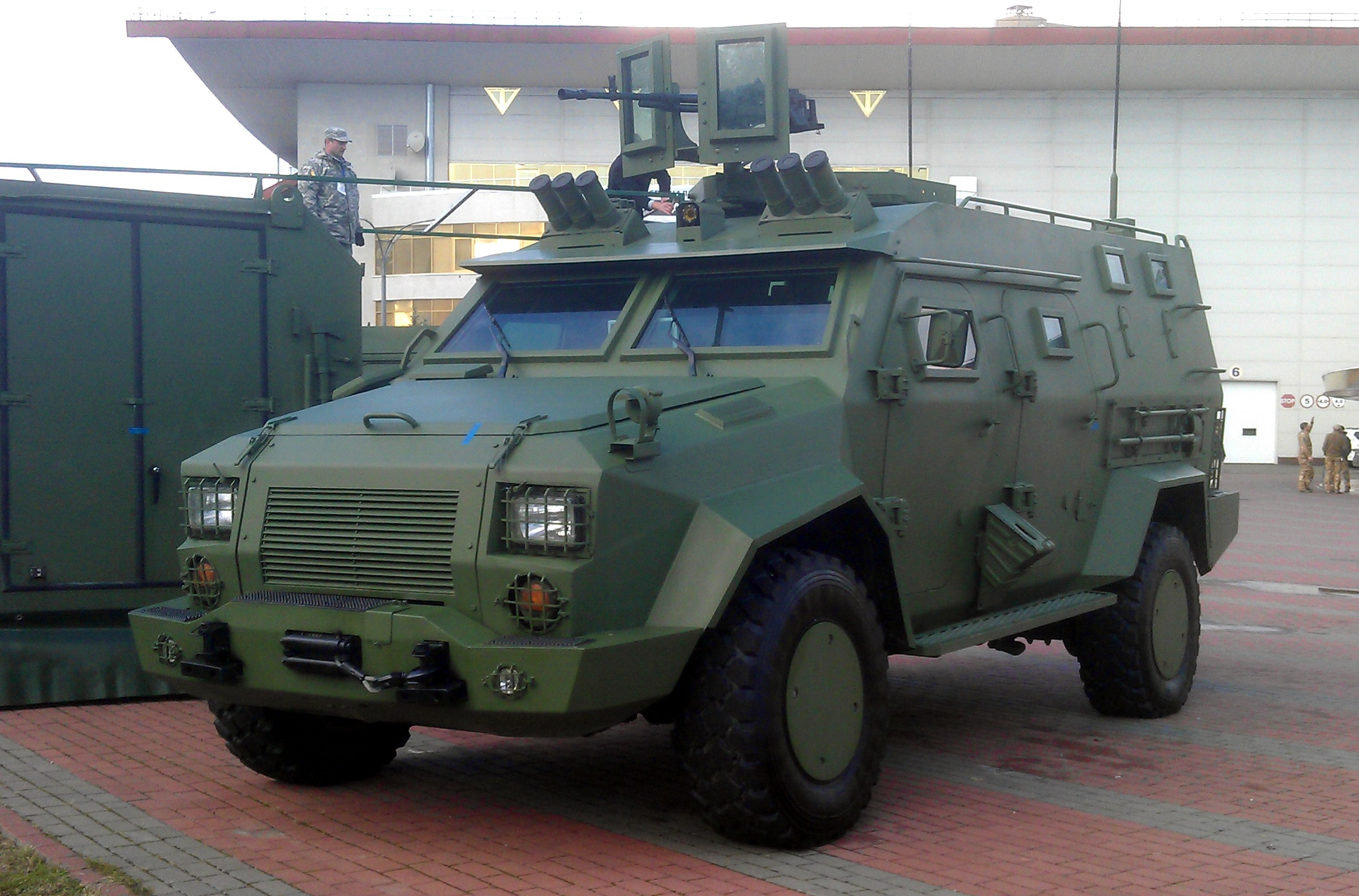
- A Bars-8 at a military exhibition.
- Type: Armored personnel carrier with MRAP capabilities
- Place of origin: Ukraine

Service history
- In service: June 2019-present
- Wars: Russo-Ukrainian War

Production history
- Designer: Bogdan Corporation
- Designed: Before 2015
- Manufacturer: Bogdan Motors
- Produced: 2016–unknown

Specifications
- Mass: 8.8 t
- Length: 6.5 m (21.3 ft)
- Width: 3 m (9.7 ft)
- Height: 2.5 m (8.2 ft) (without turret)
- Crew: 2-3
- Passengers: 8
- Armor: STANAG 4569 Level 2 steel
- Engine: Cummins Turbo Diesel V8; 385 hp
- Transmission: Aisin 6-speed automatic
- Suspension: 4x4
- Ground clearance: 0.285 m (0.94 ft)
- Operational range: 800 km
- Maximum speed: 110 km/h

The Bogdan Bars-8 is a 4x4 Ukrainian armored personnel carrier designed by the Bogdan Corporation. The Bars-8 is built on the chassis of the Dodge Ram pickup truck, and is a further development of the earlier Bars-6.

== History ==
The Bars-8 was first unveiled on April 4, 2015. In April of 2016, the Ukrainian military put the Bars-8 through multiple testing programs, ultimately finding it suitable for their needs. It entered into Ukrainian military service in June 2019.

== Design ==
The Bars-8 utilizes the 4x4 chassis of the American Dodge Ram pickup truck. The vehicle's cabin is protected by bulletproof glass and STANAG 4569 Level 2 armor. Two occupants, a driver and a commander, sit in the front of the vehicle. A third crew member is located in the roof-mounted turret. The rear of the vehicle can hold up to eight passengers.

== Service history ==
The Bars-8 entered into service with the Ukrainian military in 2019, and was immediately deployed with units in Eastern Ukraine for the War in Donbas. The type has continued to serve with the AFU throughout the current Russian Invasion of Ukraine. At least one Bars-8 and two Bars-8MMK have been destroyed by Russian forces.

Currently, Ukraine is the only operator of the Bars-8.

== Variants ==
- Bars-8: armored personnel carrier.
- Bars-8AR: artillery reconnaissance vehicle
- Bars-8MMK: mortar carrier.
- Bars-8 Taipan: version fitted with "Taipan" 23mm combat module.
- Bars-8 Enclave: version fitted with electronic warfare systems.
- Bars-8AMB: armored ambulance.

== Gallery ==
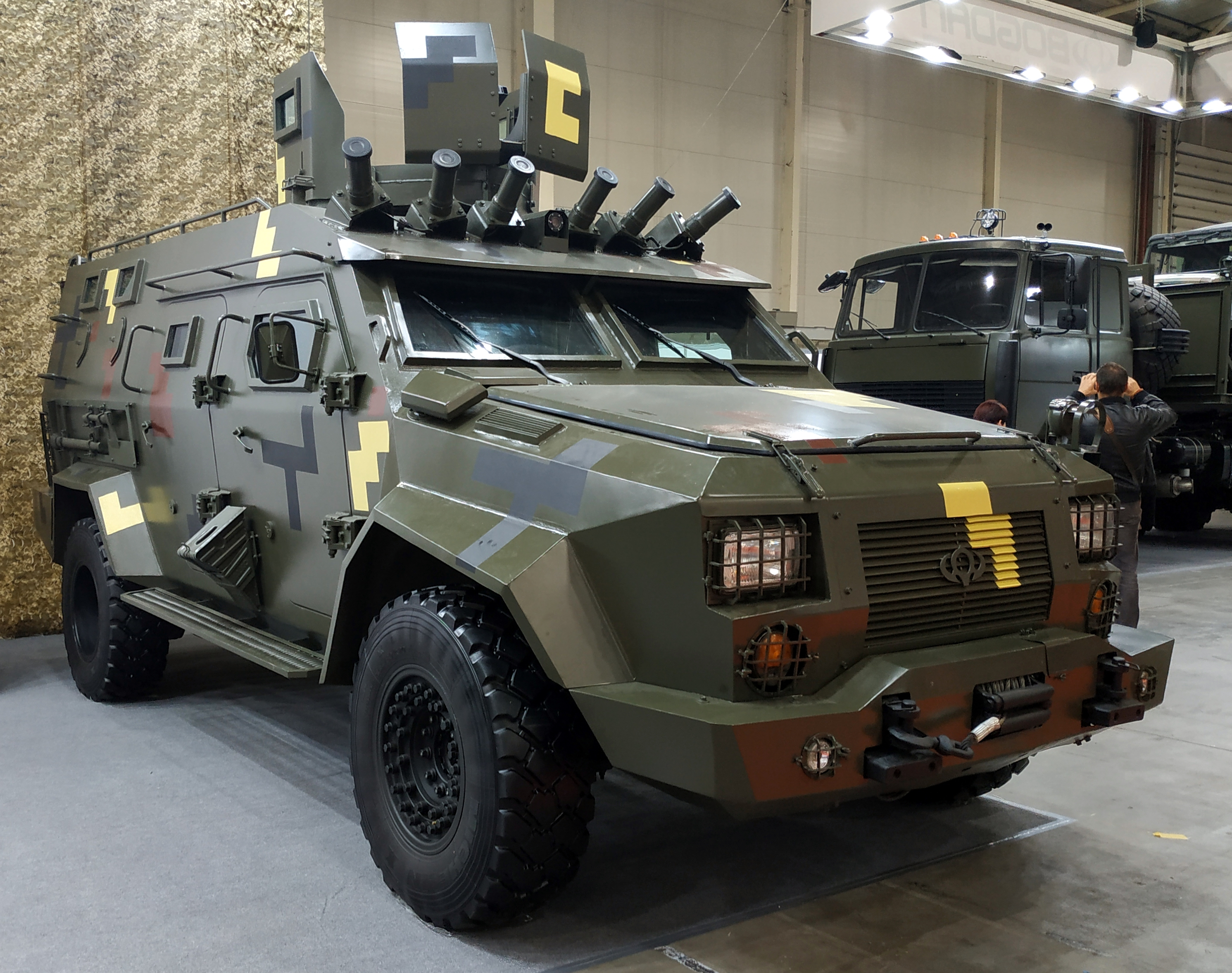
Front view.

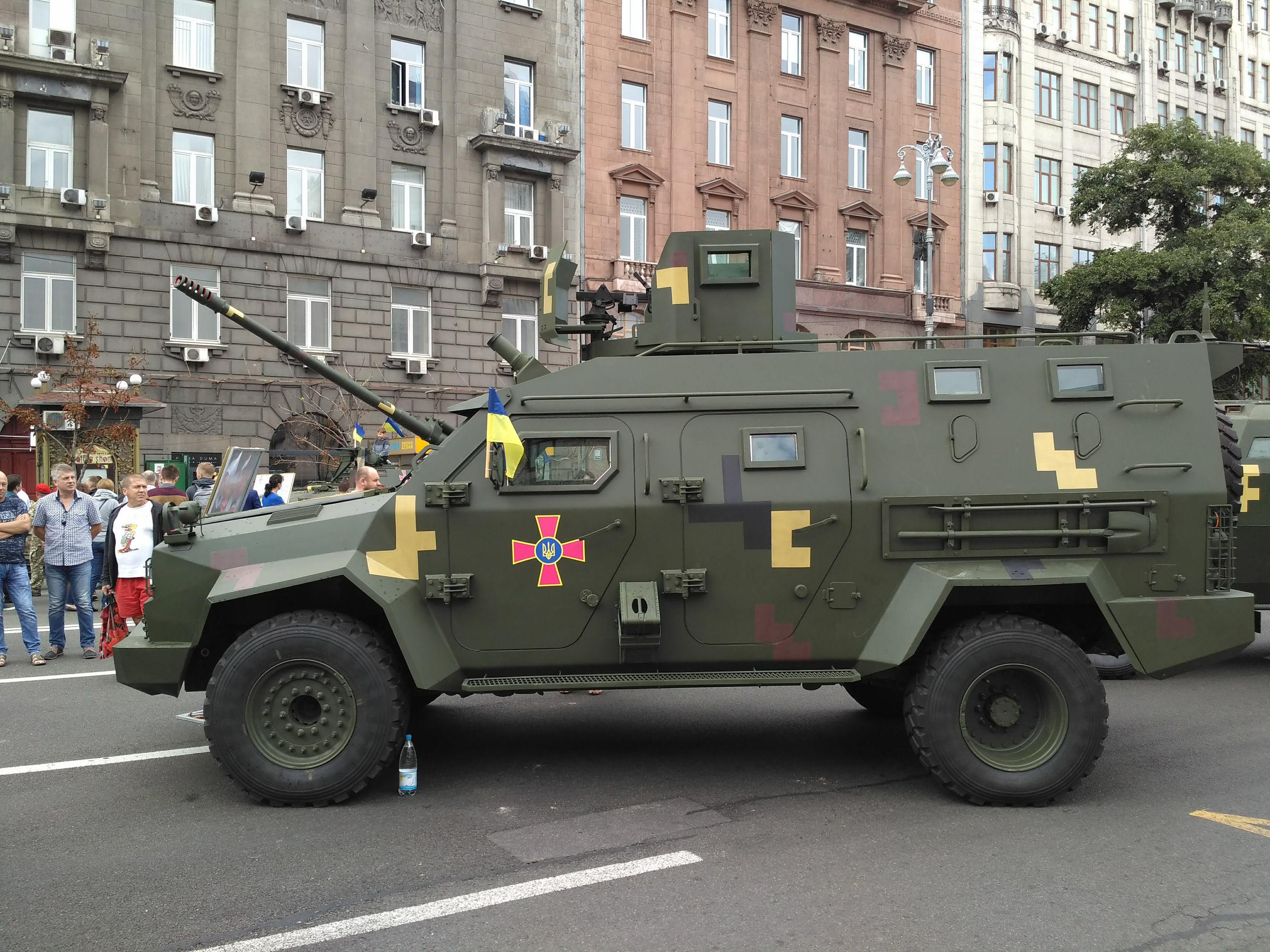
Side view.

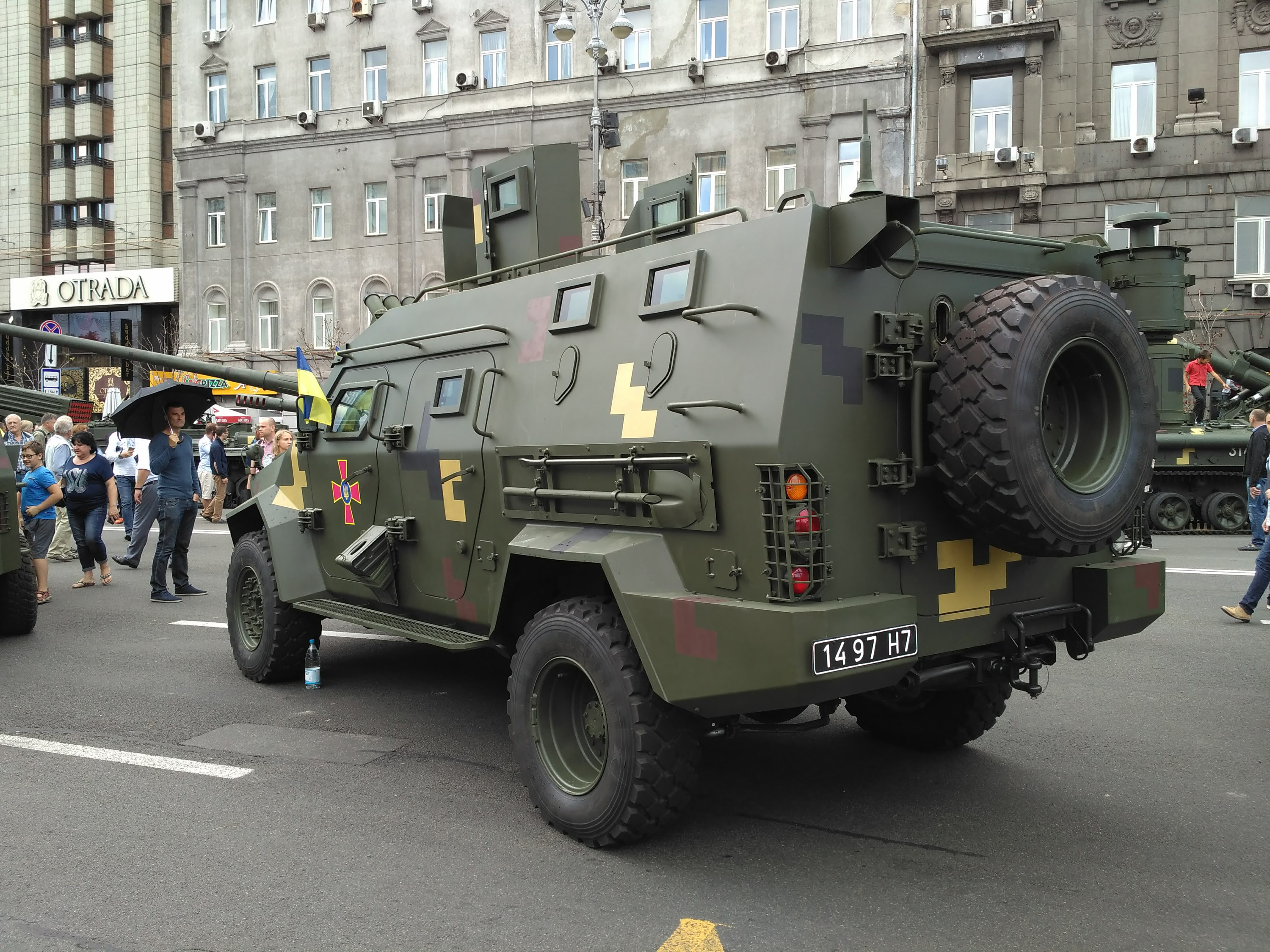
Rear view.

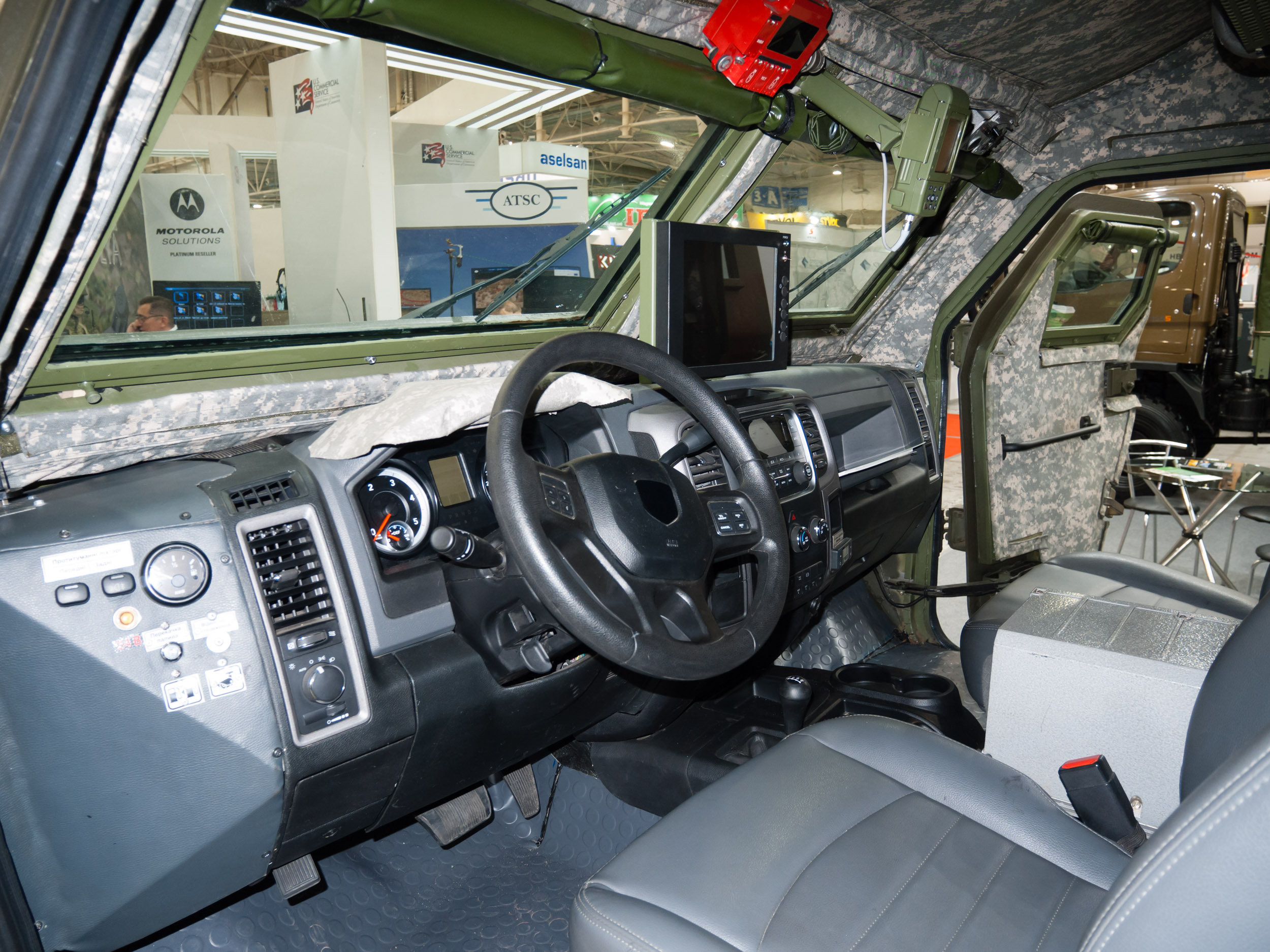
Driver's seat.

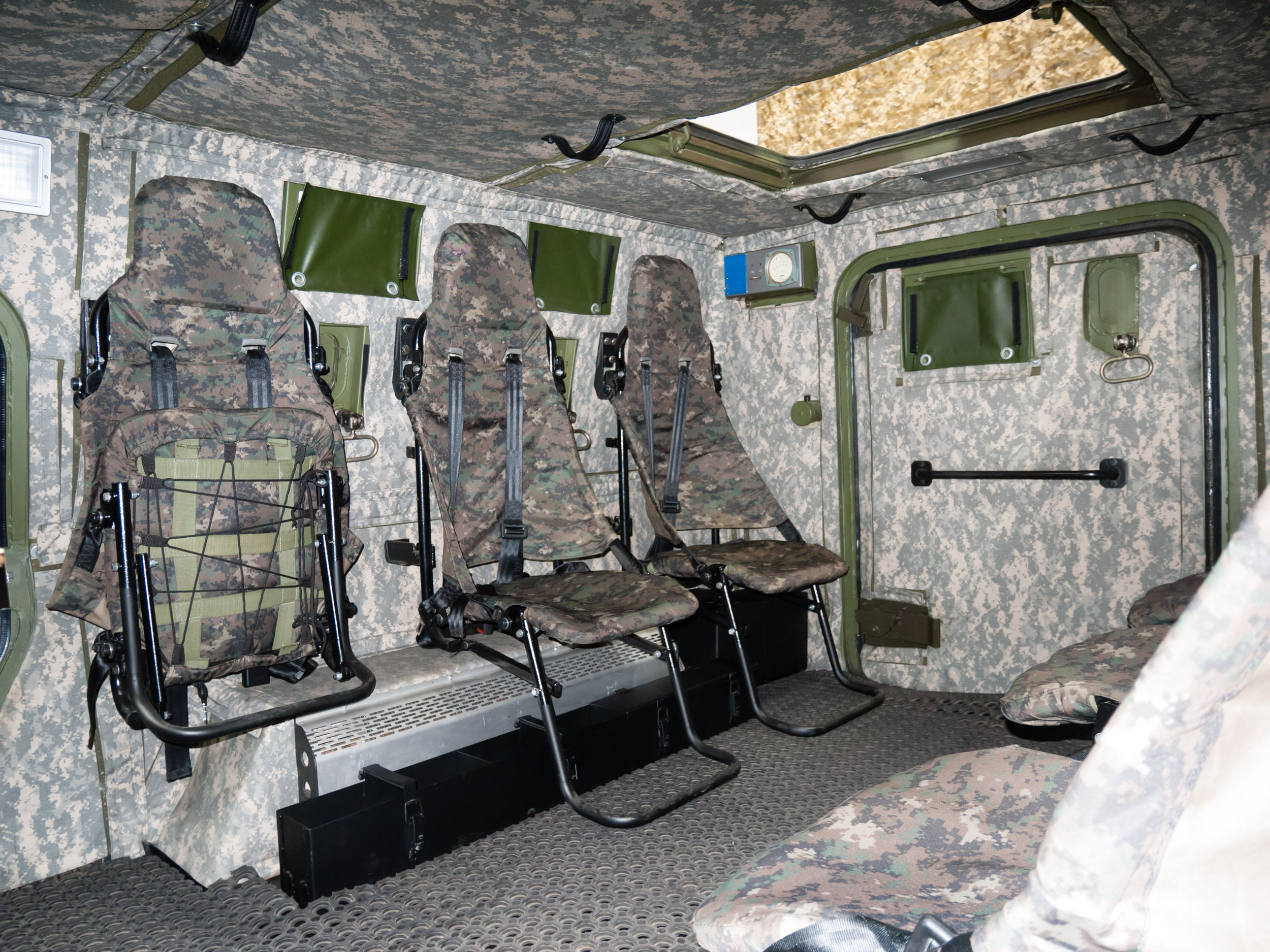
Rear troop seating.

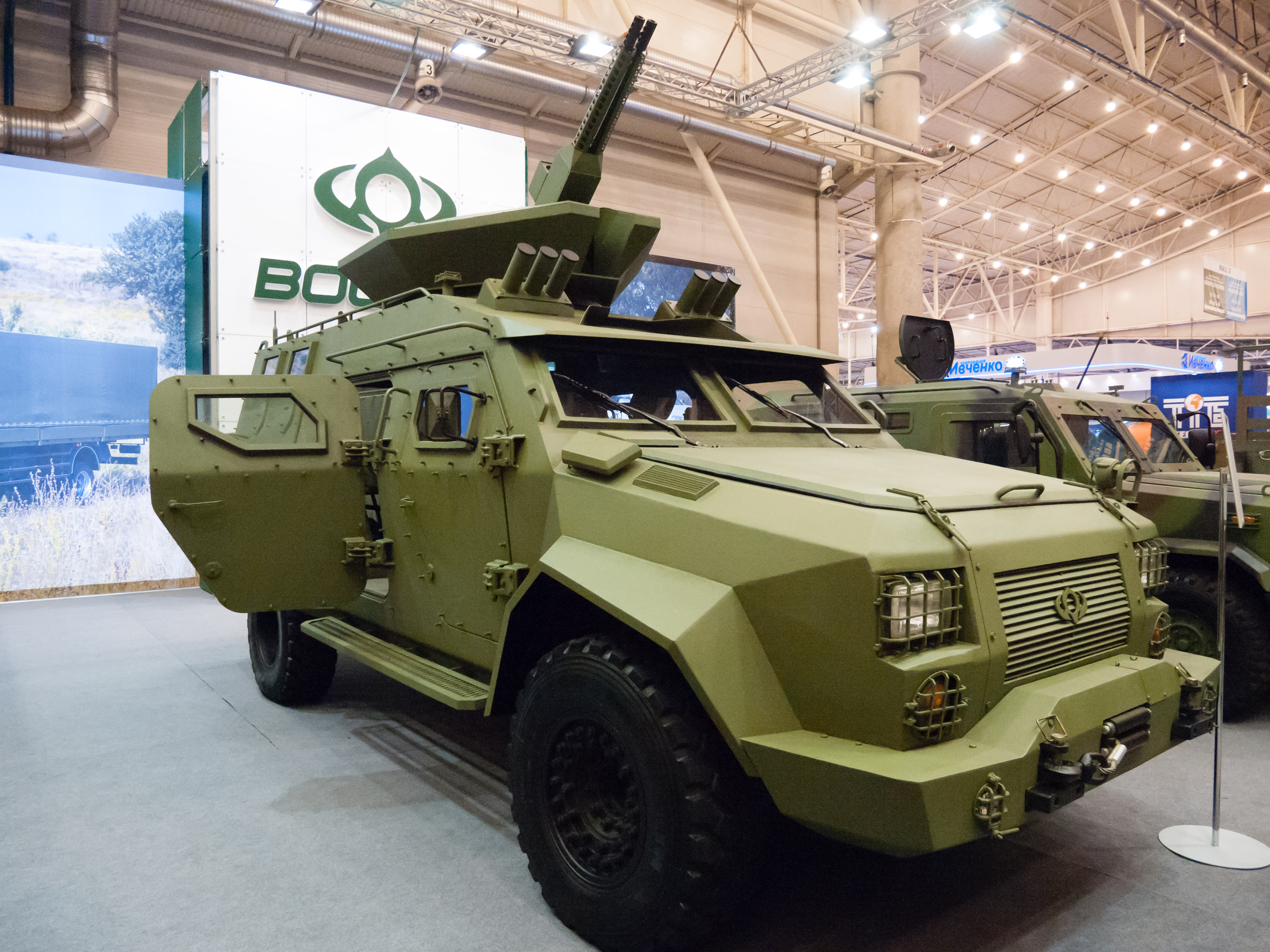
Bars-8 Taipan.

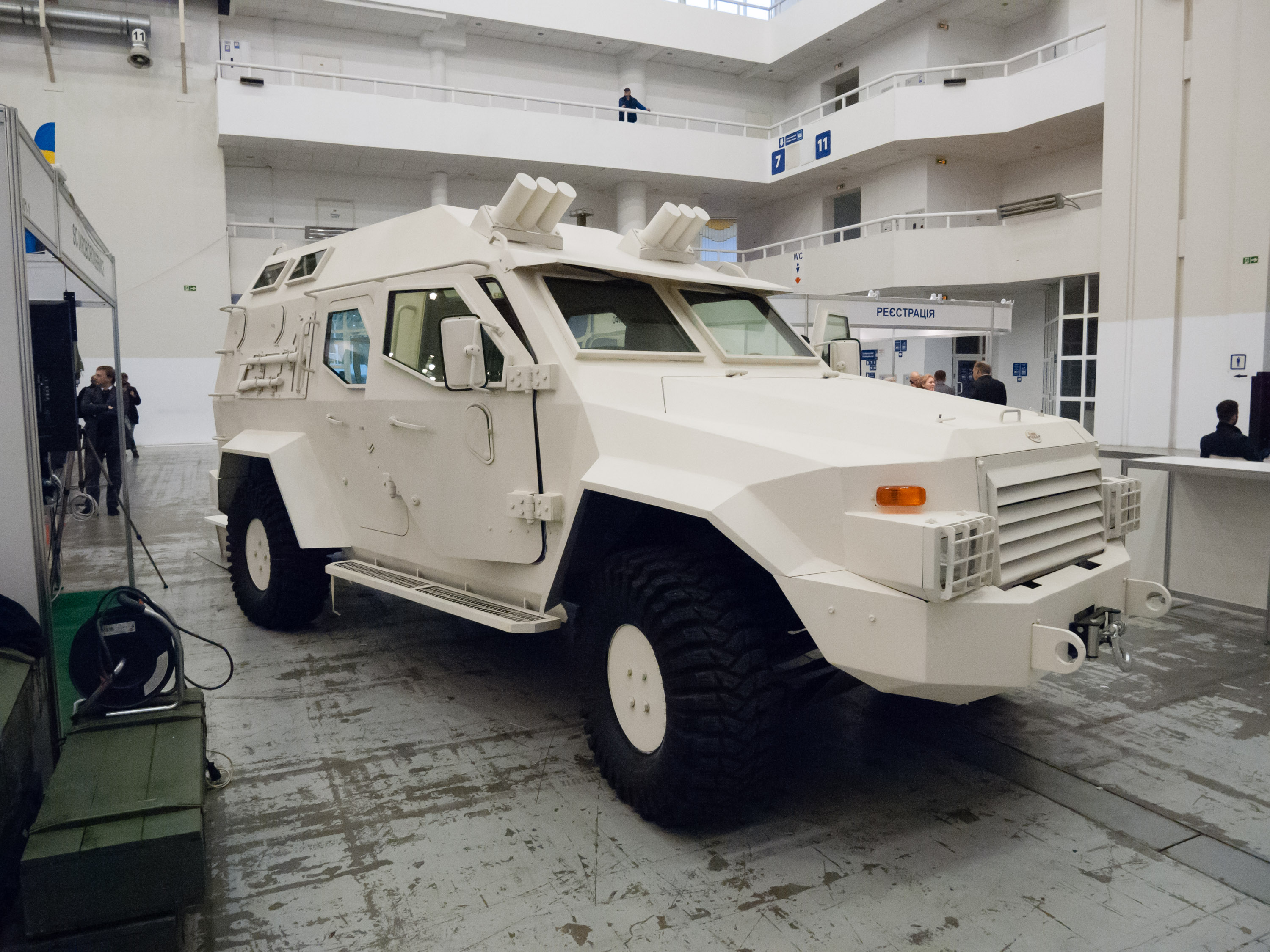
Bars-8MMK front.

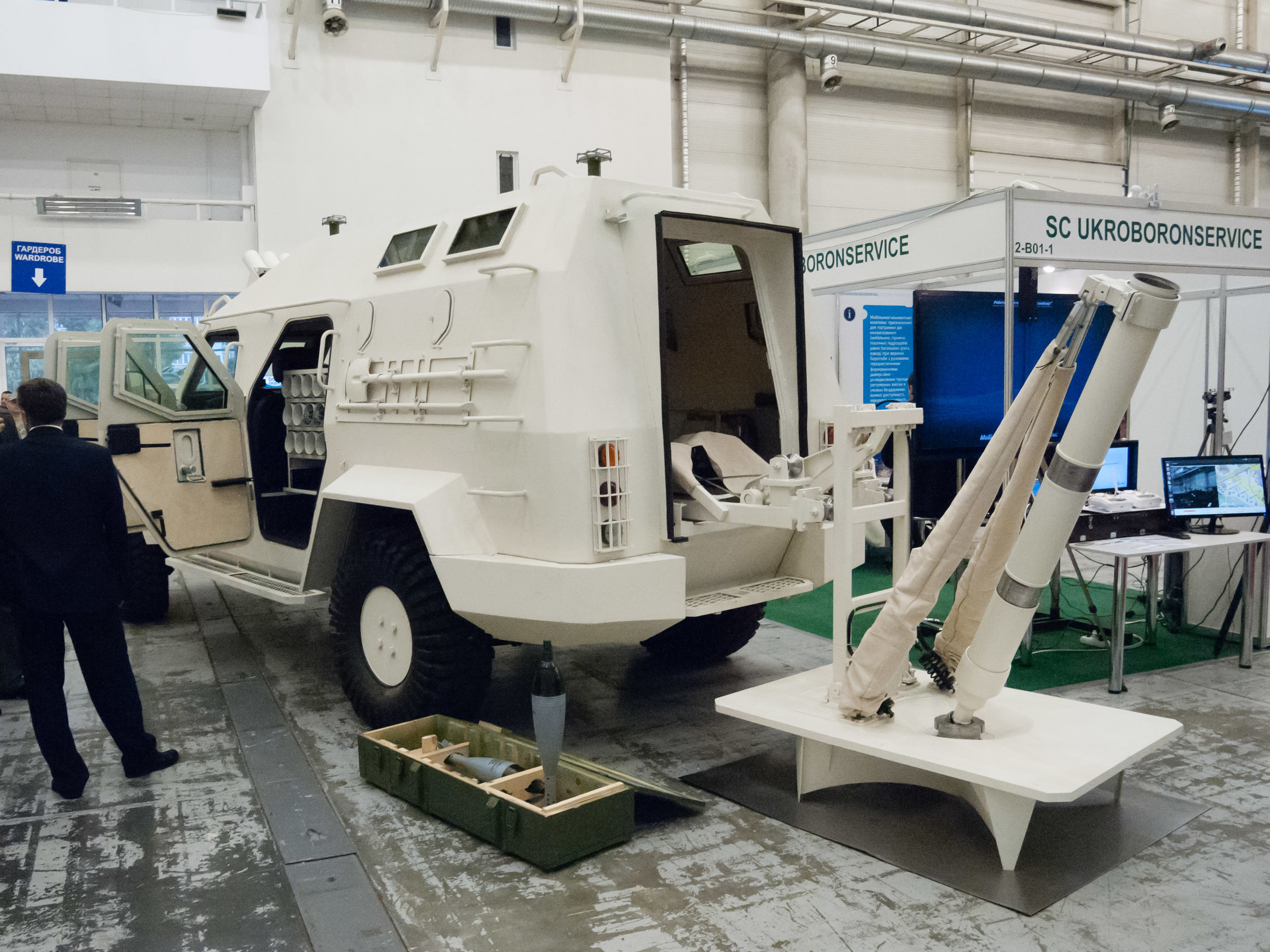
Bars-8MMK rear.

== See also ==
- Bogdan Bars-6
