= Bogdan Bars-6 =

Bars-6
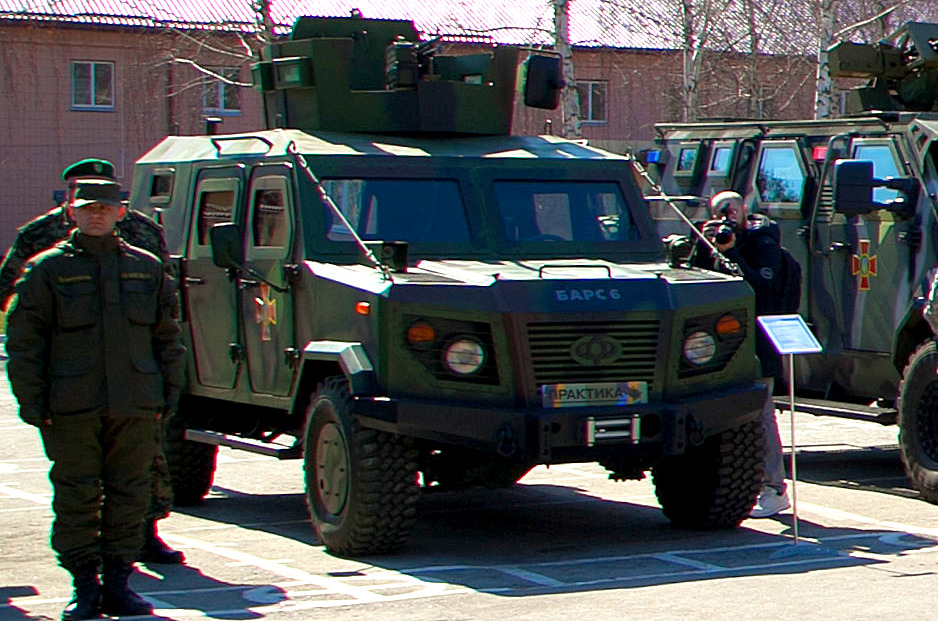
- A Bars-6 at a military exhibition.
- Type: Armored personnel carrier
- Place of origin: Ukraine

Production history
- Designer: Bogdan Corporation
- Designed: 2014
- Produced: 2014–2016
- No. built: At least 90

Specifications
- Mass: 6 t
- Crew: 2 + 6
- Armor: Steel
- Engine: Diesel; 139 hp
- Suspension: 4x4

The Bars-6 is a light 4x4 armored personnel carrier designed by the Ukrainian Bogdan Corporation. The vehicle is based on the chassis of the Kia KM450 truck.

== History ==
The Bars-6 was first unveiled publicly at the IDEX 2015 arms exhibition. The Ukrainian military began testing of the vehicle in late 2015. After the successful completion of trials, a total of 90 units were ordered for the Ukrainian National Guard.

== Design ==
The Bars-6 utilizes the Kia KM450 4x4 chassis. It is a standard layout, with two crew located in the front of the vehicle, and room for six passengers in the rear section of the vehicle.

The occupants are protected by STANAG 4569 Level 1 armor plating and bulletproof glass.

== Service history ==
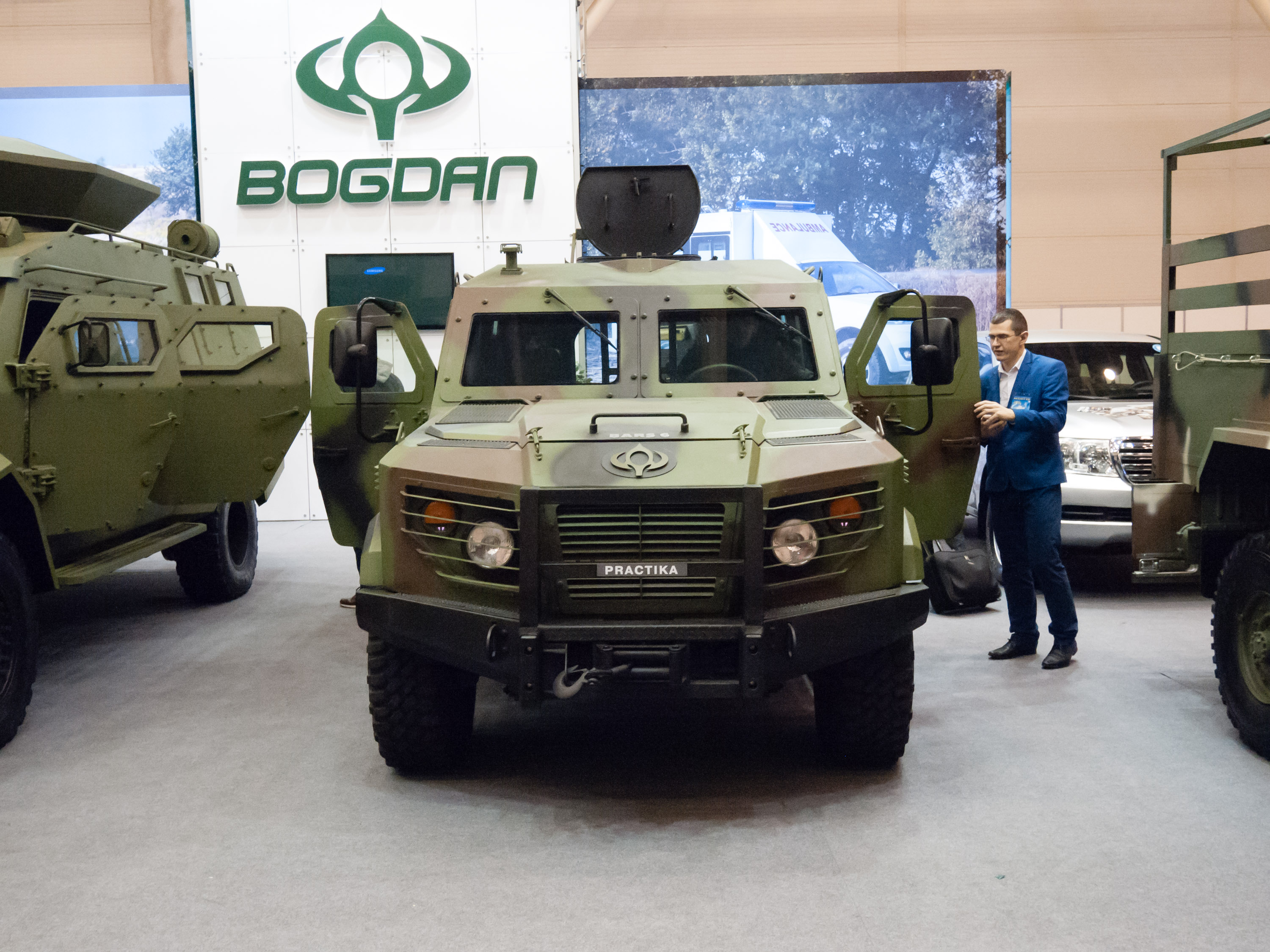
Front view.

The Bars-6's only buyer was the Ukrainian National Guard, which deployed the vehicle to combat pro-Russian rebel forces during the War in Donbas.

== See also ==
- Bogdan Bars-8
- K311 cargo truck (KM450)
