= Defence industry of Ukraine =

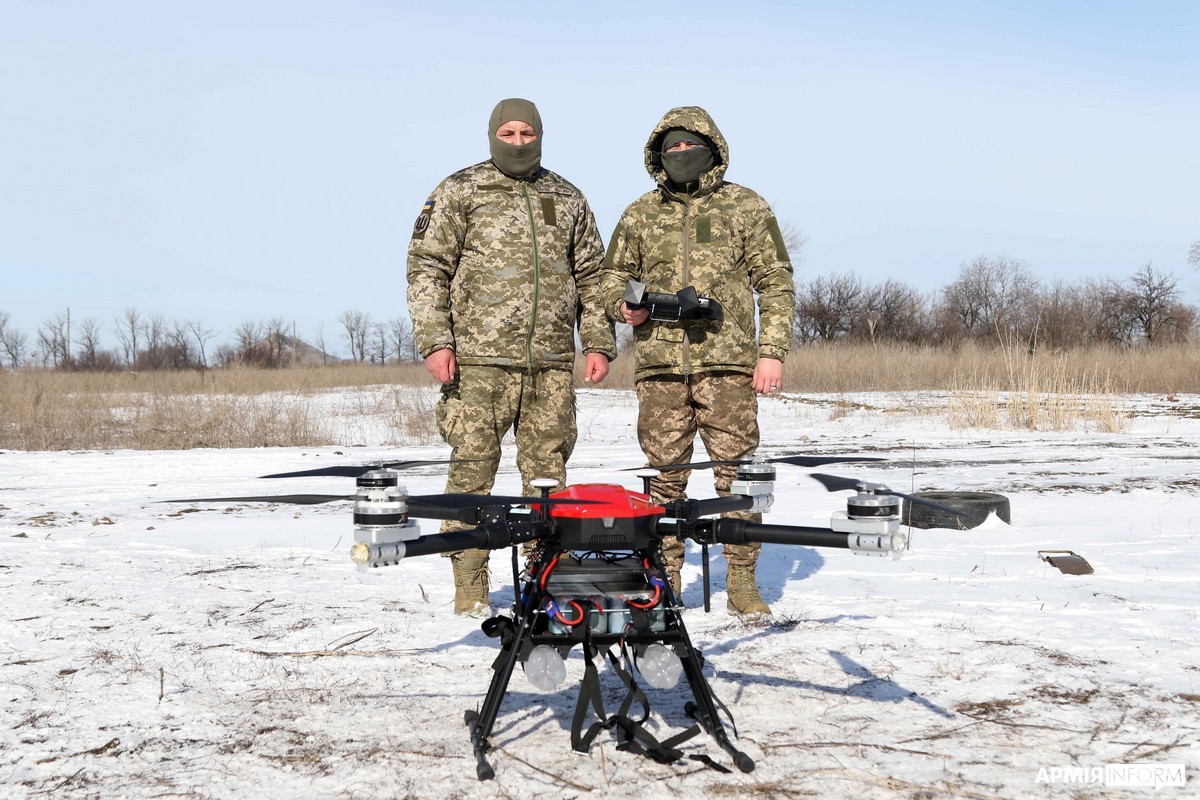
Kazhan UAV

The defence industry of Ukraine is a strategically important sector and one of country's largest employers. Before the start of the Russo-Ukrainian War, the industry was oriented mainly toward exports. A near-total export ban was imposed after the outbreak of the full-scale invasion in 2022, redirecting nearly all domestic output to the front.

In September 2025, the President of Ukraine Volodymyr Zelenskyy announced that controlled exports of surplus arms would be permitted to allow greater financing of arms needed at the frontlines.

In February 2026, the National Security and Defense Council of Ukraine announced that its planning to issue the first licences for controlled exports of surplus weapons to a government-approved list of partner states. According to the Deputy Secretary of the National Security and Defense Council of Ukraine Davyd Aloian, in February 2026 the state commission responsible for issuing the relevant licenses in wartime approved most of the 40 applications submitted by defence industry enterprises to export equipment and services.

Ukraine has become a world leader in the mass production of unmanned systems — with about 3 million produced in 2025, as well as plans to produce up to 8 million FPV drones annually — though it continues to rely on Western-supplied systems, such as Patriot, for defence against hypersonic and ballistic missiles.

== Products ==
=== Drones ===
Before 2014 and the spark of the Russo-Ukrainian War, Ukraine had lacked modern UAVs and relied upon outdated Soviet models such as the Tupolev Tu-141 and Tu-143. After 2014, there became a surge in the development of UAVs from private organizations such as Athlon Avia and Aerorozvidka who developed the A1-CM Furia and R18 respectively, however the research and development into drone warfare was slowed by the bureaucratic defence procurement system which limited investment and slowed production.

In 2022, after the Russian invasion, Ukraine expanded its production of drones and began to produce a wide variety of drones, mainly UAVs but also sea drones and ground drones en masse to counter the Russian onslaught. Civilian workshops were established all over Ukraine, often in home garages or kitchens and under programs such as the People's FPV and SocialDrone UA, where participants are given instructions on how to source parts and assemble drones. Non-profits such as the Wild Hornets and Escadrone have been established to fabricate and deliver large amounts of combat and support drones to the armed forces. By 2023, over 200 Ukrainian companies were involved in the drone sector, with many securing state contracts. By the end of 2024 it was estimated that 96% of all unmanned aerial vehicles used by the military were domestically manufactured in Ukraine. As of 2025 the industry is dependent on Chinese components.

Notable drones include:

- The Sting is the main interceptor of long range drones. It has autonomous AI & a Claymore-style directional fragmentation charge.
- The Palianytsia turbojet missile-drone dubbed a "new class of weaponry" by Ukrainian President Volodymyr Zelenskyy and unveiled on Ukraine's Independence Day.
- The Baba Yaga classed heavy bomber drones, which can also deliver supplies and serve as a "mother ship" for smaller drones. Several models are referred to as Baba Yaga including Aerorozvidka's R18 as well as Khazan, Nemesis, and Vampire drones.
- The Liutyi is the main long-range one-way attack drone. It was developed by Ukroboronprom in late 2022 and first used in 2023. Often described as Ukraine's domestic equivalent to the Shahed 131 drones, the Liutyi is often used alongside other drones to attack military and energy infrastructure within Russia.
- The AIR Pro is the main interceptor of anti-personnel drones. It has autonomous AI. It isn't spool-fed. It has a Claymore-style directional fragmentation charge & loiters for 35 minutes.
- The Molfar is the main anti-personnel, fiber optic, jink & final mile AI, FPV drone. It's 10 inches long, carries a 4 kg payload & has a 25 km range. It's evasive maneuvers jink interceptor swarms by side diving, using turning gambits & then outclimbing interceptors.
- The Dragon drone which are developed as incendiary drones and designed to spray molten thermite to destroy potential obstructions and cover. The first documented use was in August 2024.
- The MAGURA V5 unmanned surface vehicle which was introduced in 2023 and can serve multiple roles including reconnaissance, kamikaze attacks on ships, and as an anti-aircraft platform.

Since 2024, the Armed Forces of Ukraine have used hardware and software developed by the Ukrainian-Estonian company Farsight Vision for drones. Its FSV Platform transforms drone footage into 3D terrain models—including media captured in electronic warfare environments—for use in battlefield intelligence and situational awareness platforms.

A number of drone models serve as primary consumable ordinance for tactical operations. The Armed Forces of Ukraine (AFU) utilize a tiered procurement strategy, balancing high‑volume acquisition of tactical strike units with specialized, small‑batch production of advanced, mission‑tailored platforms. The AFU also maintains a “boutique” production line for dedicated drone platforms with purpose-built drone designs and deliberately low monthly output levels prior to large‑scale industrial expansion.

Ground robotic systems have also grown into a major category in their own. By mid-2026, around 280 Ukrainian companies were producing more than 550 distinct models of unmanned ground vehicles, used for casualty evacuation, logistics resupply, demining, and direct-fire support; ground robots were carrying out more than 10,000 logistics missions per month by April 2026, and the Ministry of Defence of Ukraine set a target of producing 50,000 ground drones over the course of the year.

=== Ammunition ===
125mm tank shells, as well as 122mm, 152mm, and 155mm artillery shells are in mass production

Small-arms bullet cartridges re-entered production in 2024, with 5.45×39mm and 5.56×45mm ammunition being produced for the first time since 2014, after the Russian seizure of the Luhansk Ammunition Plant had crippled Ukraine's domestic bullet-making capacity.

Full-cycle domestic production of NATO-standard 155mm shells began in 2025 under a licensing agreement between the Ukrainian company Ukrainian Armor and the Czech manufacturer Czechoslovak Group, covering shell-casing manufacture, explosive filling, and final assembly; the partners targeted annual output of around 300,000 shells by 2026.

== Structure ==
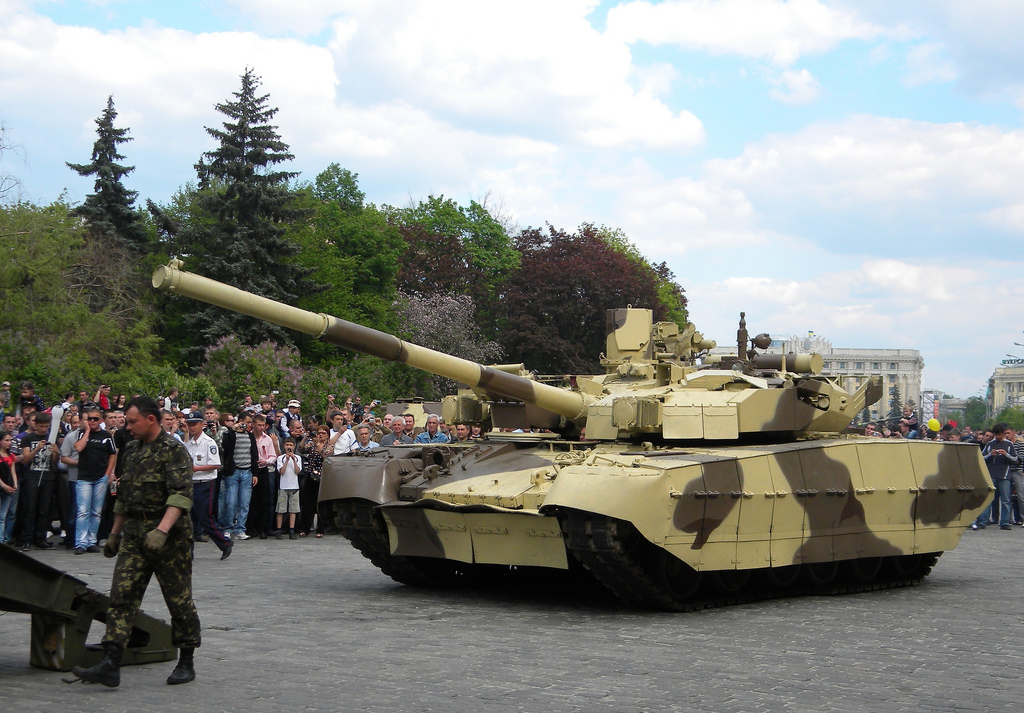
BM Oplot, produced by the KMDB guided onto a tank transporter

Ukraine's defence industry is organized around Ukroboronprom, a state-owned conglomerate of over 130 companies. These companies include Soviet era giants such as Ivchenko-Progress aircraft design bureau that was opened in 1945, to newer companies such as RPC Fort which came into existence in the 1990s.

In August 2018, the Groysman government simplified the procedure for granting economic entities the right to export and import military goods and goods that contain data that constitute a state secret. This opened the market for private defence companies, which previously could only work with foreign clients through a state-owned company.

In October 2018, speaking at the Atlantic Council in Washington, US Special Representative for Ukraine Kurt Volker said that the United States had lifted the arms embargo on Ukraine. This gave a boost to the international cooperation and development of private companies.

On 22 July 2020, the new government ministry Ministry of Strategic Industries of Ukraine was established to aid and develop Ukraine's defence industry.

== Major manufacturers ==
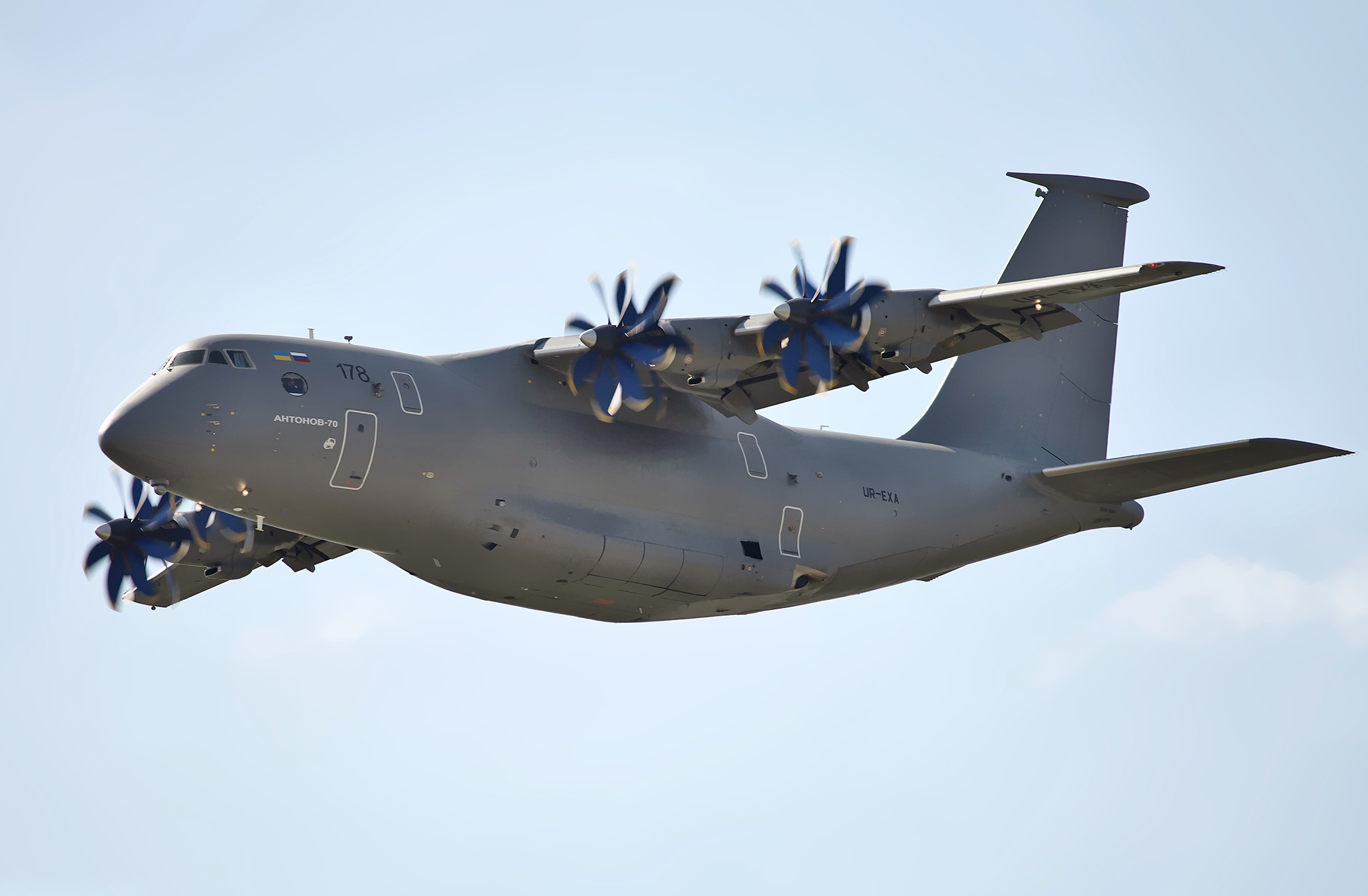
Antonov An-70

=== Aircraft ===
See: Aviation industry of Ukraine

- Antonov (Kyiv)
  - Antonov Serial Production Plant (Kyiv)
  - Kyiv Aircraft Repair Plant 410 (Kyiv)
  - Kharkiv State Aviation Manufacturing Enterprise (Kharkiv)
- General Aviation Design Bureau of Ukraine (Kyiv)
- Odesa Aviation Plant
- Vinnytsia Aviation Plant
- Konotop Aircraft Repair Plant «Aviakon» (Konotop)

=== Armored vehicles, automotive, and special engineering equipment ===
- Kharkiv Factory of Transportation Machine-building of Malyshev (Kharkiv)
  - Kharkiv Morozov Machine Building Design Bureau (Kharkiv)
- Kharkiv Armored Plant
- Mykolaiv Armored Plant
- Lviv Armored Plant
- Kyiv Armored Plant
- Zhytomyr Armored Plant
- Kremenchuk Automobile Plant KrAZ (Kremenchuk)
- SPU Praktyka

==== Engine ====
- Motor-Sich (Zaporizhzhia)
  - Ivchenko-Progress (Zaporizhzhia)
- Zorya-Mashproekt (Mykolaiv)

=== Shipbuilding ===
An * indicates that the city is located in Russian occupied Crimea. Ukraine rejects Russia's annexation of Crimea as does the majority of sovereign states in the world, but Russia has had de facto control over Crimea since 2014.

- Azov Shipyard (Mariupol)
- State Research and Design Shipbuilding Center (Mykolaiv)
- Black Sea Shipyard (Mykolaiv)
- Kherson Shipyard (Kherson)
- Kuznya na Rybalskomu (Kyiv)
- Mykolayiv Shipyard (Mykolaiv)
- More (Feodosia*)
- Okean Shipyard (Mykolaiv)
- Sevastopol Shipyard (Sevastopol*)
- Zalyv (Kerch*)

=== Rocket ===
- Pivdenmash (Dnipro)
  - Pivdenne Design Bureau (Kharkiv)
- Vizar

=== Electronics ===
- Luch Design Bureau
- Orion (company, Ukraine)
- Telecard Device
- Infozahyst

=== Radiolocation ===
- Topaz (company)
- Iskra (company, Ukraine)
- Kyiv State Plant «Burevisnyk»
- Research Institute «Kvant»
  - Quantum Radiolocation
- Radionix

=== Artillery ===
- Artillery Armament Design Bureau
- Precision Mechanics Plant

=== Firearms ===
- RPC Fort (Vinnytsia)
- Mayak (Kyiv)
- Zbroyar
- Valar (company)
- Scientific center of precision engineering

=== Protection gear ===
- Ukrainian Armor
- Kharkiv plant of personal protective equipment

=== Munition ===
- Artem (company)
- Tasko Corporation
- Progress (company)
- Luhansk Ammunition Plant

=== Explosives ===
- Donetsk State Chemical Products Plant

=== Optics ===
- Arsenal Factory
- Izyum Instrument Manufacturing Plant

=== Other ===
- Khartron (Kharkiv)
- Farsight Vision

== Exports ==
In 2012, Ukraine's export-oriented arms industry had reached the status of world's 4th largest arms exporter. Since the start of the war in Donbas, Ukraine's military industry has focused more on its internal arms market and as a result slipped to the 9th spot among top global arms exporters by 2015, 11th spot by 2018, and the 12th spot among global arms exporters by 2019. In 2019, the main importers of Ukrainian weapons were India, Saudi Arabia and Turkey. As of February 2025, Ukraine is upholding its ban on the export of weapons due to the full-scale invasion, although it is expected for the ban to be lifted in 2025.

== History ==
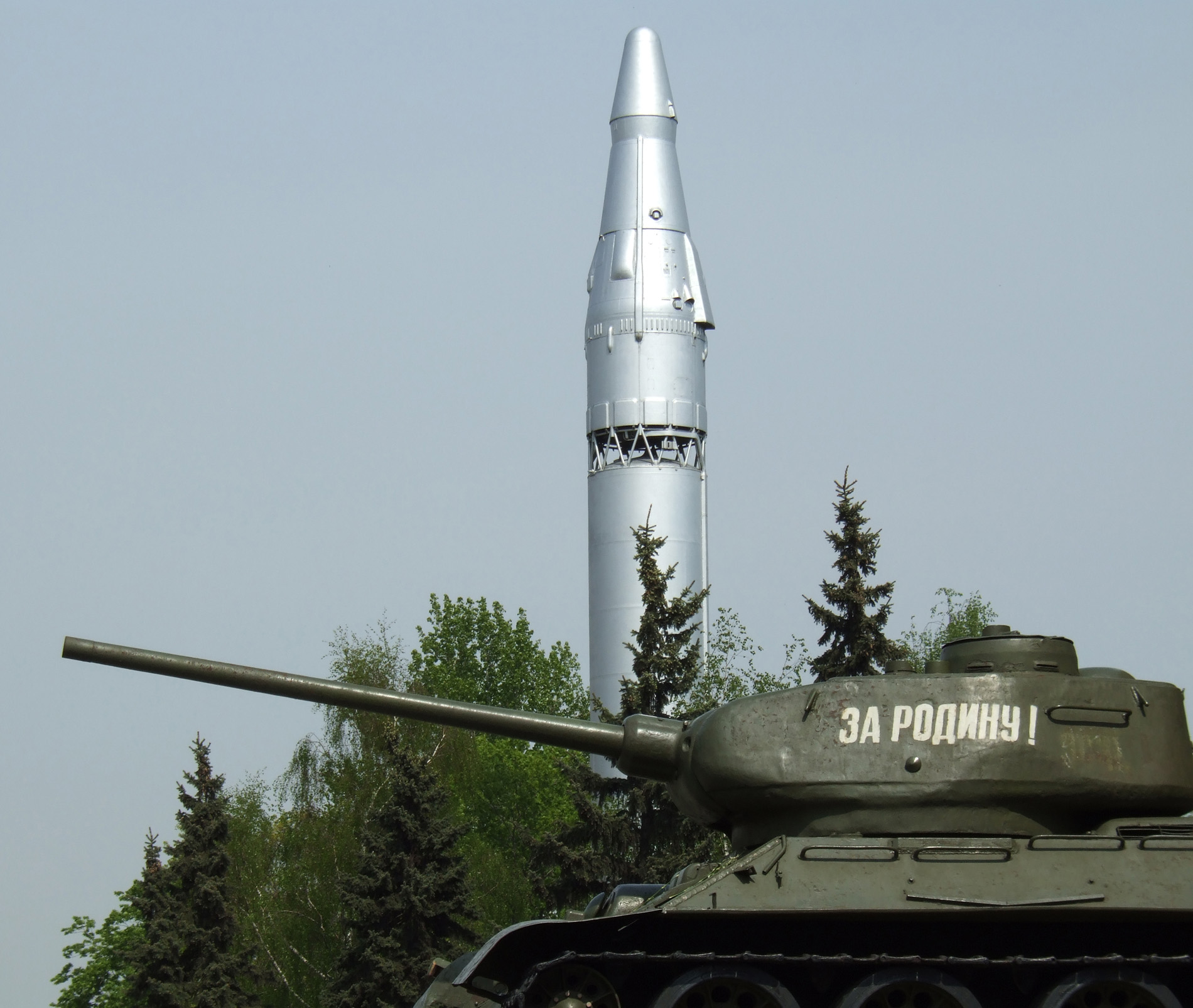
Soviet R-9 Desna ICBM and T-34 tank on display at the Central Armed Forces Museum (Russia), both were designed and manufactured in Ukraine

Some Soviet ICBMs were actually built at the Yuzhmash plant in the Ukrainian city of Dnipro. Russia's only aircraft carrier was also built in the Ukrainian SSR, as well as a number of other Russian military ships.

From 1992 to 1996, 113 Ukrainian enterprises were engaged in dual-use goods, including weapons. The lack of clear legislation resulted in an arms market where everyone earned whatever however they could, including in illegal schemes. The state took control of Ukraine's defence industry in October 1996 under the company Ukrspetsexport.

From 1992 to 2014, Ukrainian military exports mainly fell into three categories: new or used equipment, joint development, and maintenance of Soviet-made machinery and equipment. The output of Ukrainian defence plants grew 58% in 2009, with largest growth reported by aircraft builders (77%) and ship builders (71%). Until 2011, the first place for Ukraine in terms of profitability was the sale of aircraft and the provision of services for its modernization and repair. In second place was armored vehicles. In 2011 trade in armored vehicles (including the export of the T-84 Oplot to Thailand) replaced the military aviation export as most profitable military exports, and since then third place has traditionally been occupied by trade in air defense equipment. In 2012 (by far Ukraine's most successful year of arms export) Ukraine had the status of world's 4th largest arms exporter. In 2013 Ukraine's defense sector manufactured a total of 11.7 billion Ukrainian hryvnia (₴) worth of goods, ₴10 billion of which were exported. Prior to 2014 a major part of Ukraine's military business was the selling of Soviet-era stockpiles.

Since the 2014 start of the war in Donbas, Ukraine's military industry focused more on its internal arms market and started to export significantly fewer abroad. Before 2014, Ukrainian producers had not received significant revenues from the Armed Forces of Ukraine. In the first 9 months of 2014, Ukraine's defense sector produced a record ₴13 billion worth of goods, and the increase was largely due to government orders for the war in Donbas. Meanwhile, the Ukrainian army began to buy weapons, ammunition and equipment abroad en masse. And since every year, the percentage of such imports increases. As a result of Ukraine's arms manufacturing refocus on its own military needs, it slipped to the 9th spot among top global arms exporters by 2015.

After 2015, Ukraine's defence industry stabilized, but Ukraine failed to return to its former exports. In 2018, Ukraine occupied the 11th spot among global arms exporters. And in 2019 the 12th spot. According to Stockholm International Peace Research Institute (SIPRI), Ukraine's share in the world arms market was 2.7% in 2009-2014 and in 2014-2018 1.3%. The structure of exports also changed: the main part was made up of high-tech products such as guided anti-tank missiles. The business of trading in Soviet stocks has come to naught - the warehouses were emptied by the war in Donbas. In 2019, the main importers of Ukrainian weapons were India, Saudi Arabia and Turkey. Before 2020 there was a lot of corruption.

One of major part of the exports was gas turbine engines for ships (mainly for the Indian Navy), helicopter engines, and aircraft engines for unmanned aerial vehicles like Baykar Bayraktar Akıncı and Baykar Bayraktar Kızılelma.

The full-scale Russian invasion saw massive growth in the volume and range of military hardware being produced. By 2024, hundreds of arms producers and military equipment startups were reported to be active, collectively employing more than 300,000 workers.

In addition to drones, artillery and their munitions have also begun mass production in Ukraine, with the domestically produced howitzer the 2S22 Bohdana being a notable example. In 2022, only one Bohdana existed, which was the sole functioning prototype. By 2023, the Bohdana's manufacturer, the Kramatorsk Heavy Duty Machine Tool Building Plant, had started mass production and by 2024, over 184 Bohdanas had been produced. 82mm mortar mines, 125mm tank shells, as well as 122mm, 152mm, and 155mm artillery shells have also entered mass production Small-arms bullet cartridges re-entered production in 2024, with 5.45×39 and 5.56×45mm ammunition being produced for the first time since 2014, due to the Russian seizure of the Luhansk Ammunition Plant crippling Ukraine's ability to manufacture bullets.

Ukraine has also made strides in the area of missile production, with Ukraine producing around 100 R-360 Neptune cruise missiles in 2024 alone. Ukraine has also created a new class of weaponry dubbed missile-drones, which are low-cost, turbojet powered missiles designed for long-range strikes within Russia via swarm attacks. Notable missile-drones include the Palianytsia, Trembita, and Peklo types, all of which have entered serial production.Since 2006, Ukraine has worked on developing a ballistic missile system that would replace the aging and depleting OTR-21 Tochka. As such, funding for the project began but was canceled due to the 2008 financial crisis. After the start of the War in Donbas, interest in the project was reignited, and research and development began, with the chassis of the transporter erector launcher being completed in May 2017 and two Hrim-2 prototypes had been completed by April 2019. Funding was to be set aside in February 2021 to produce a test battery of two transporter erector launchers, two loading machines, and two control units, however it was delayed until June 2023. In August 2024, Zelenskyy announced that a ballistic missile had been successfully test fired and it is rumored that the Hrim has seen successful deployment at Saky air base and Crimea.

=== Milestones and accomplishments ===
- Ukraine holds the annual military exhibition Arms and Security.
- An augmented reality system LimpidArmor for armored vehicles was presented at the XIII International Specialized Exhibition "Arms and Security 2016".
- In 2016, the Delta (situational awareness system) was presented, with several other software solutions for armed forces like GisArta, MyGun, Topo, Kropyva, Dzvin-AS, Prostir.
- A number of small arms like Snipex M, Snipex T-Rex, Snipex Alligator, SGM-12,7, Zbroyar Z-10, Zbroyar Z-15, M4-WAC-47, Malyuk, Submachine gun «Elf», Goblin submachine gun, Khortytsia pistols
- UAG-40, M120-15 «Hammer», M60-16 «Camerton».
- A number of armoured vehicles like T-84, BTR-3, BTR-4, Otaman, Kevlar-E, Berserk (IFV), Tur (IFV)
- Developed the anti-ship missile complex R-360 Neptune (see Sinking of the Moskva).
- In 2022, several new weapons systems saw use. They include the first Ukrainian 155mm self-propelled howitzer 2S22 Bohdana with precision munition Kvitnyk. Several MRLS --- Vilkha, Verba, Bureviy, Berest (MRLS). UAV's Sokil-300, A1-CM Furia, Shark (UAV) a number of MRAP like Dozor-B, Kozak, SBA Varta, Novator and ATGM's like Skif and RK-3 Corsar. Jet infantry flamethrower RPV-16, RK-4 and thermobaric grenade RGT-27S.
- Aircraft building program include Antonov An-178, modernisation of soviet helicopters MSB-2, MSB-6, MSB-8, Mi-24, light helicopter VM-4.
- Ukrainian Shipbuilding Program include Volodymyr Velykyi-class frigate, Gyurza-M-class gunboat, Centaur-class fast assault craft, Vespa-class missile boat and Coral-class patrol ship, Orlan-class patrol boat.
- Ukrainian Rocket Program also include tactical missile system Hrim and anti-air missile complex Dnipro and Korshun-2 (cruise missile), mid-range Koral (surface-to-air missile), air-to-ground Blyskavka (rocket)

=== Western weapons commitments ===
On 30 September 2023, Ukrainian president Volodymyr Zelenskyy held a forum for 250 Western arms manufacturers, from 30 countries, in Kyiv. President Zelenskyy said that he wants to increase domestic weapons production and manufacture more Western weapons.

Saying: "Ukraine is in such a phase of the defence marathon when it is very important, critical to go forward without retreating. Results from the frontline are needed daily," Zelenskyy told executives representing more than 250 Western weapons producers...We are interested in localizing production of equipment needed for our defence and each of those advanced defence systems which are used by our soldiers...It will be a mutually beneficial partnership. I think it is a good time and place to create a large military hub,”

The Ukrainian Foreign Ministry claimed that 20 agreements between Ukraine and Western companies have been signed already.

On February 3, 2022, a contract was signed between Ukraine and Turkey to bolster their partnership in the production of unmanned aerial systems, with an over 30,000 square foot factory near Kyiv to be built Turkish company Baykar. The factory will focus on the production on the TB2 or TB3 model drones and employ around 500 people, including 300 Ukrainian engineers and technicians, with the goal of producing around 120 units every year. On February 2024 it was announced that construction of the factory had begun and would take 12 months to finish and that the project would cost USD 95.5 million over the next decade. The factory will also focus on the training of personnel in the use of Baykar drones as well as maintenance and modernization.

In 2023 it was announced that the Ukrainian Defense Industry and the Czech company Česká zbrojovka a.s. had made an agreement of the licensed assembly and later production BREN 2 assault rifles in Ukrainian facilities under the "Sich" brand, with active assembly being announced later that year. Talks of localized production were announced in February 2025 during a meeting between the Ministry of Defense and the Czech Ministry of Defense as well as representatives of leading Czech defense companies.

On March 3, 2024, German company Rheinmetall announced its plans to build at least 4 factories in Ukraine which would focus on manufacturing artillery shells, military vehicles, gunpowder, and anti-aircraft weapons. On June 10, 2024, it was announced that the first factory was opened, which would focus on the manufacturing and maintenance of military vehicles including the TPz Fuchs armored personnel carriers, Lynx fighting vehicles, and the Panther KF51 tanks.

On September 3, 2025, the Minister of Defense of Denmark Troels Lund Poulsen announced that the Ukrainian weapons firm Fire Point would construct a plant in Vojens primarily for the manufacture of solid rocket fuel and the production of associated engine casings connecting components as well as the assembling of rocket engines. The plant is expected to open in 2026 with the "main phase" beginning in 2027.

== See also ==
- List of armoured fighting vehicles of Ukraine
- Armed Forces of Ukraine
- List of design bureaus in Ukraine
- List of Ukrainian weaponry makers
- Shipbuilding in Ukraine
- Aircraft industry of Ukraine
- Ukrainian Navy
- Nuclear weapons and Ukraine
- T-84 Oplot
- ZBROYARI: Manufacturing Freedom
