= BM-21UM "Berest" =

Ukrainian 122 mm Multiple rocket launcher

The BM-21UM Berest is a Ukrainian 122 mm multiple rocket launcher. The system is based on the KrAZ-5401 cargo chassis and the modernized BM-21 Grad launcher. Instead of 40 missiles in the Grad launcher, Berest launcher has 50 missiles.

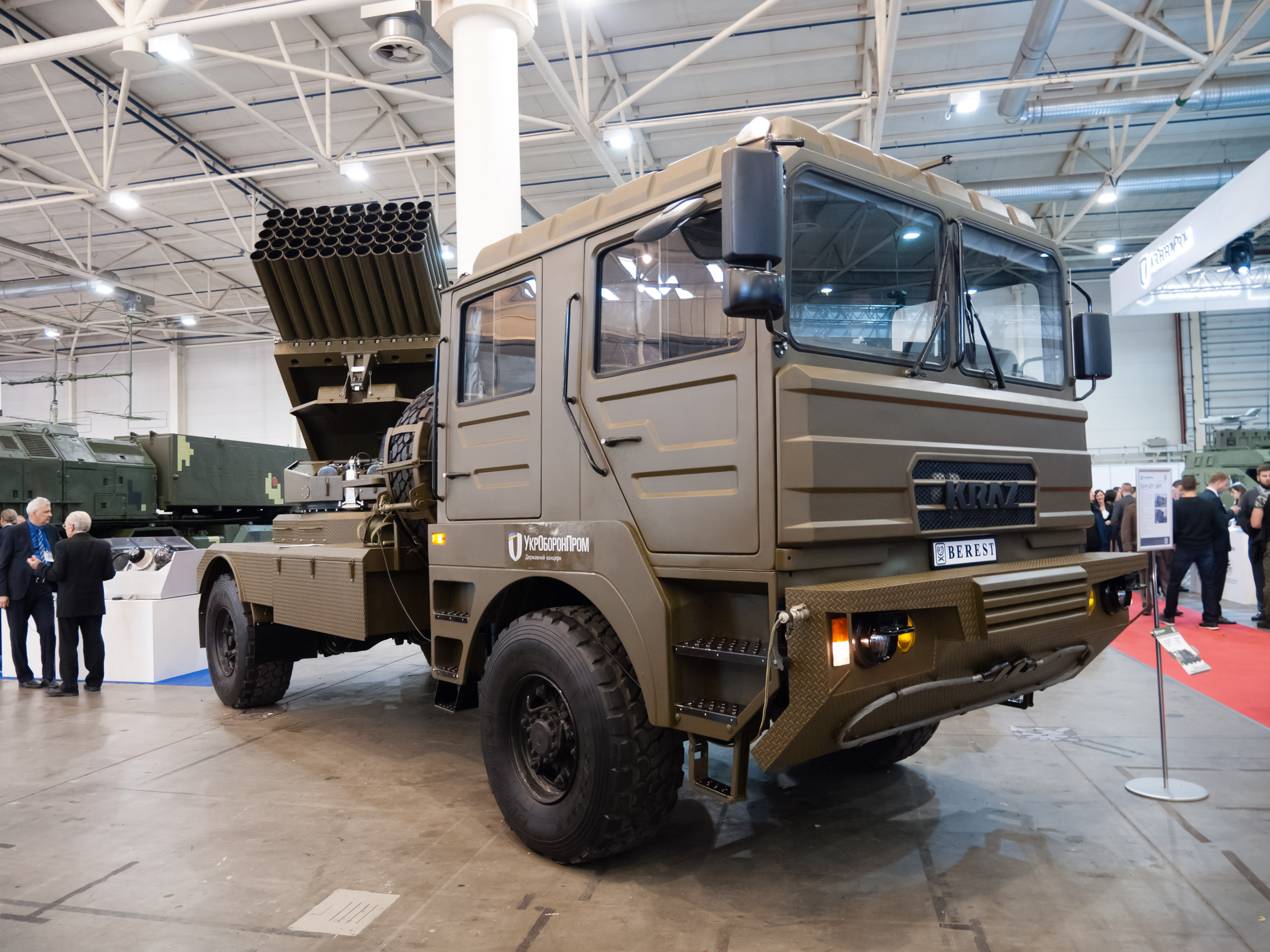
Berest at the military exhibition Weapons and Security 2018

== History ==
The BM-21UM Berest system was presented for the first time at the Weapons and Security 2018 exhibition, which took place on October 9–12 in Kyiv. Berest is a deep modernization of the BM-21 Grad, and is designed to replace it.

The system was made by the Shepetivka repair plant for its own working capital.

== Gallery ==
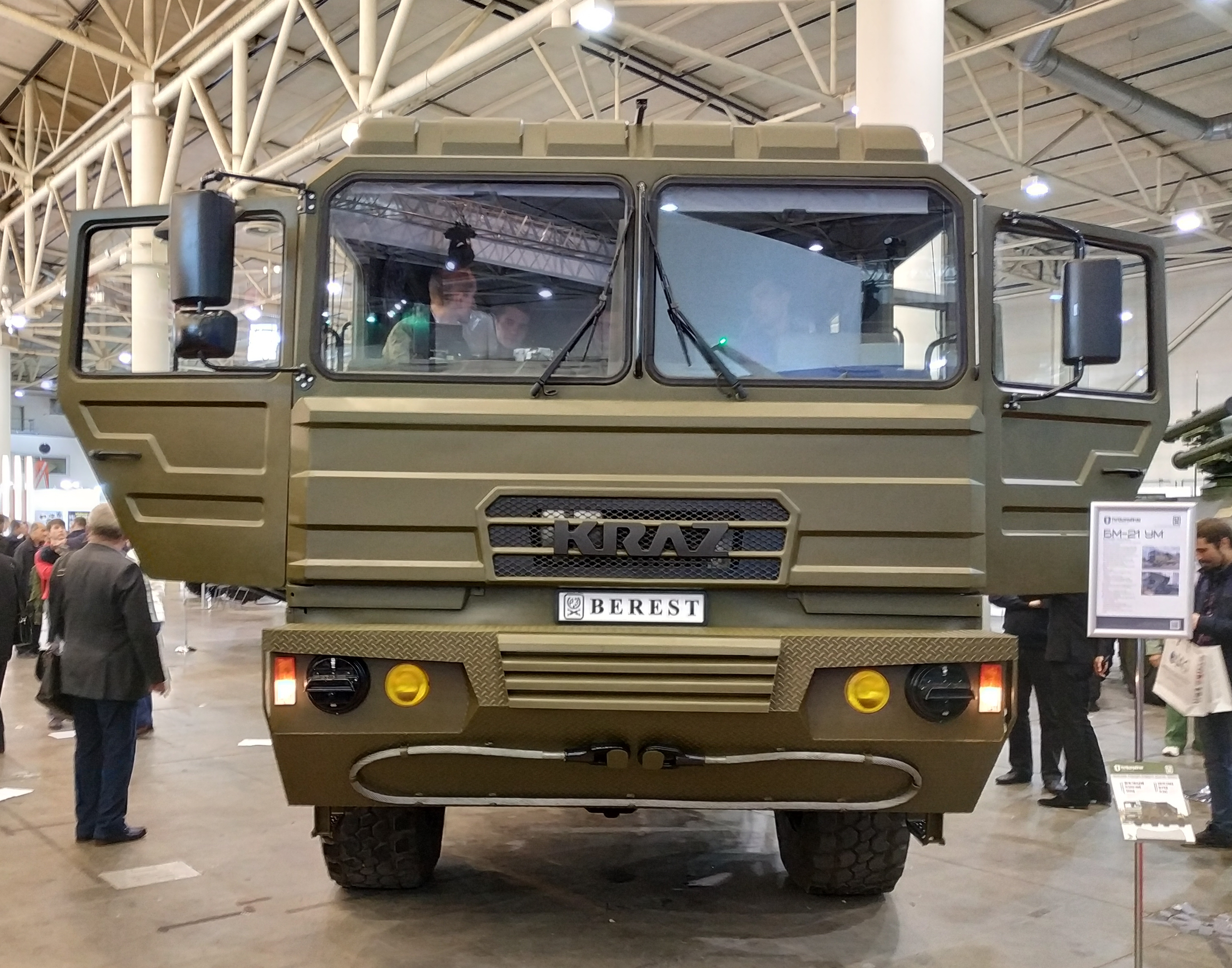

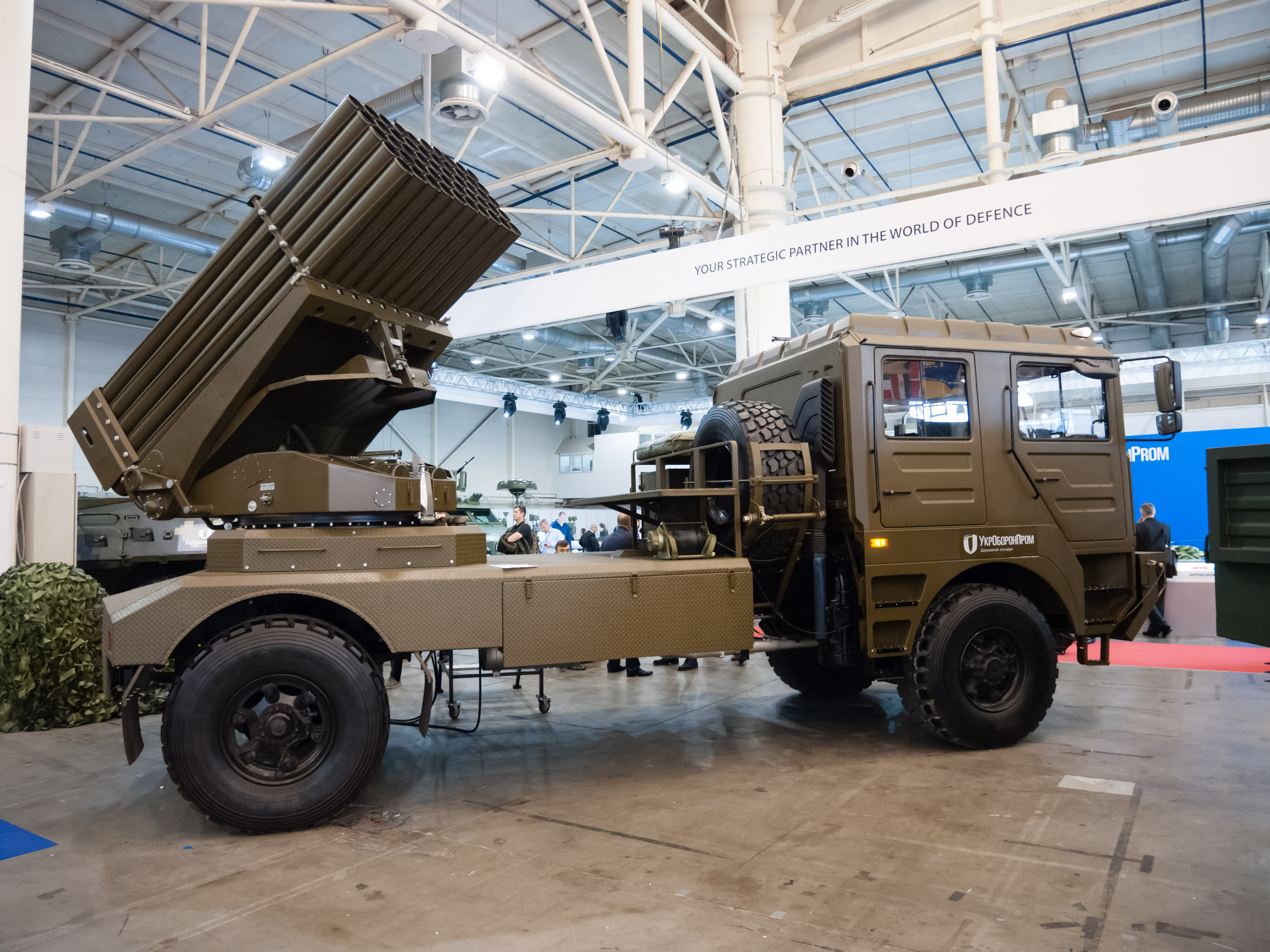

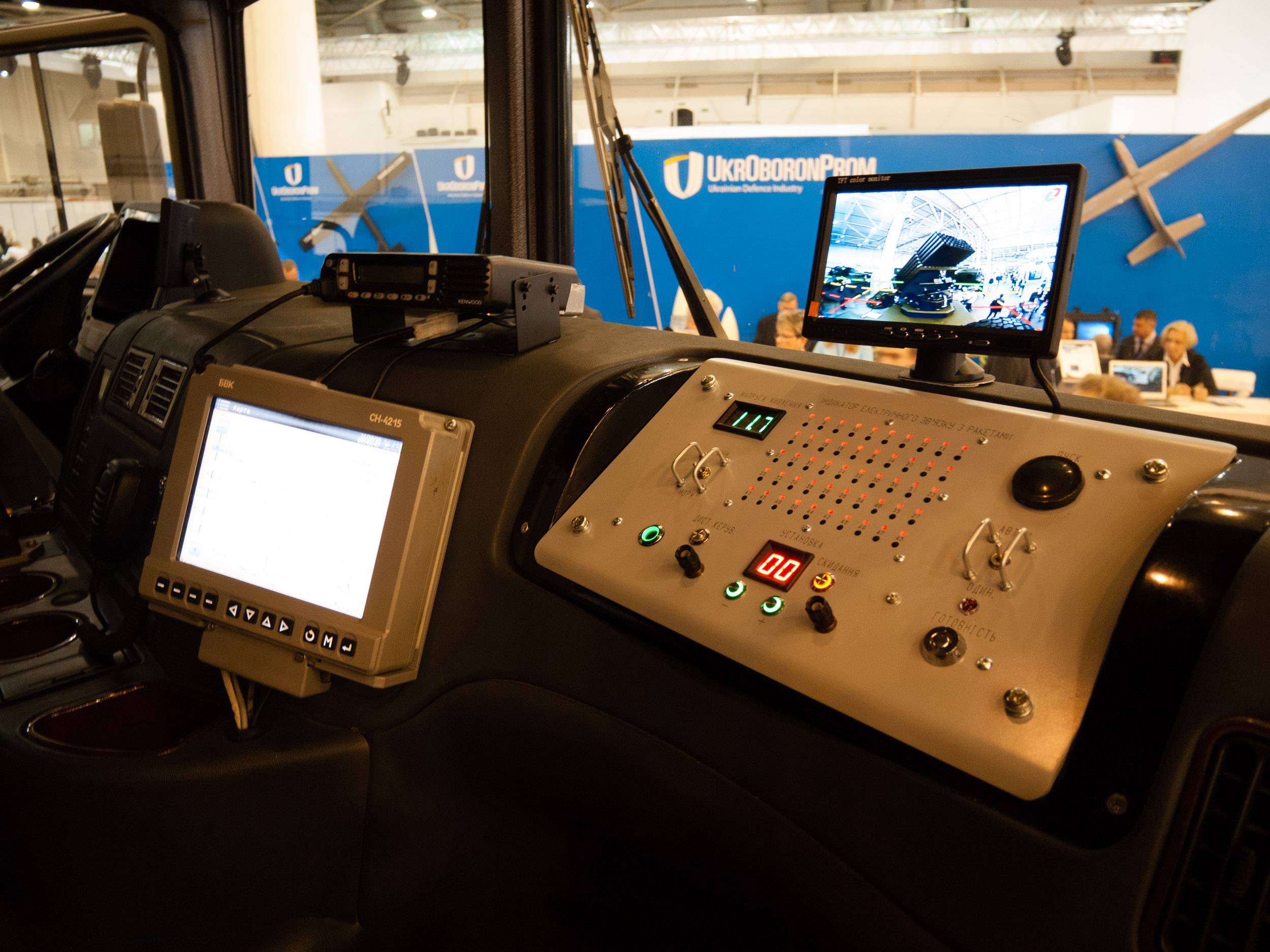
Launch console in the cab

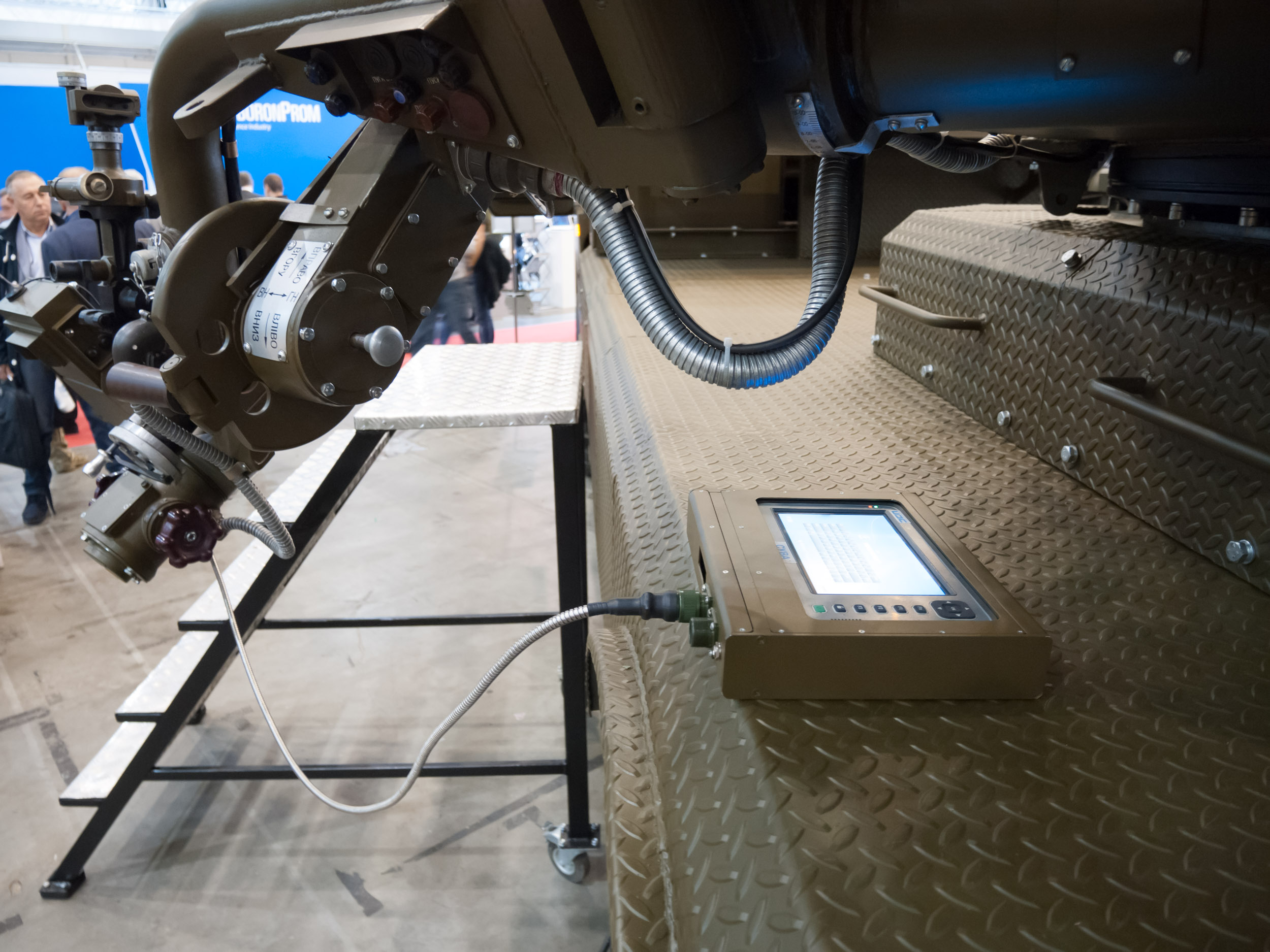

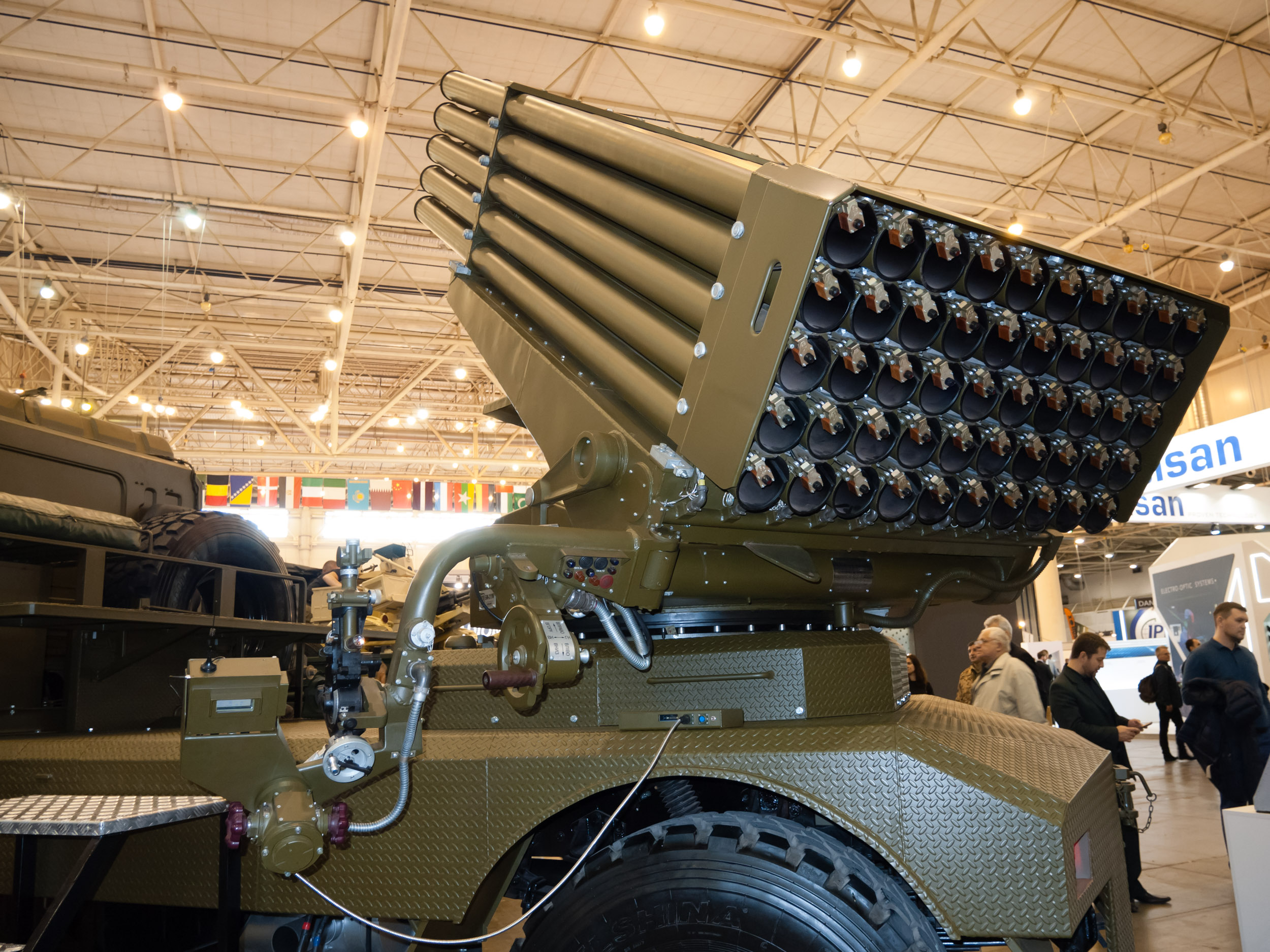

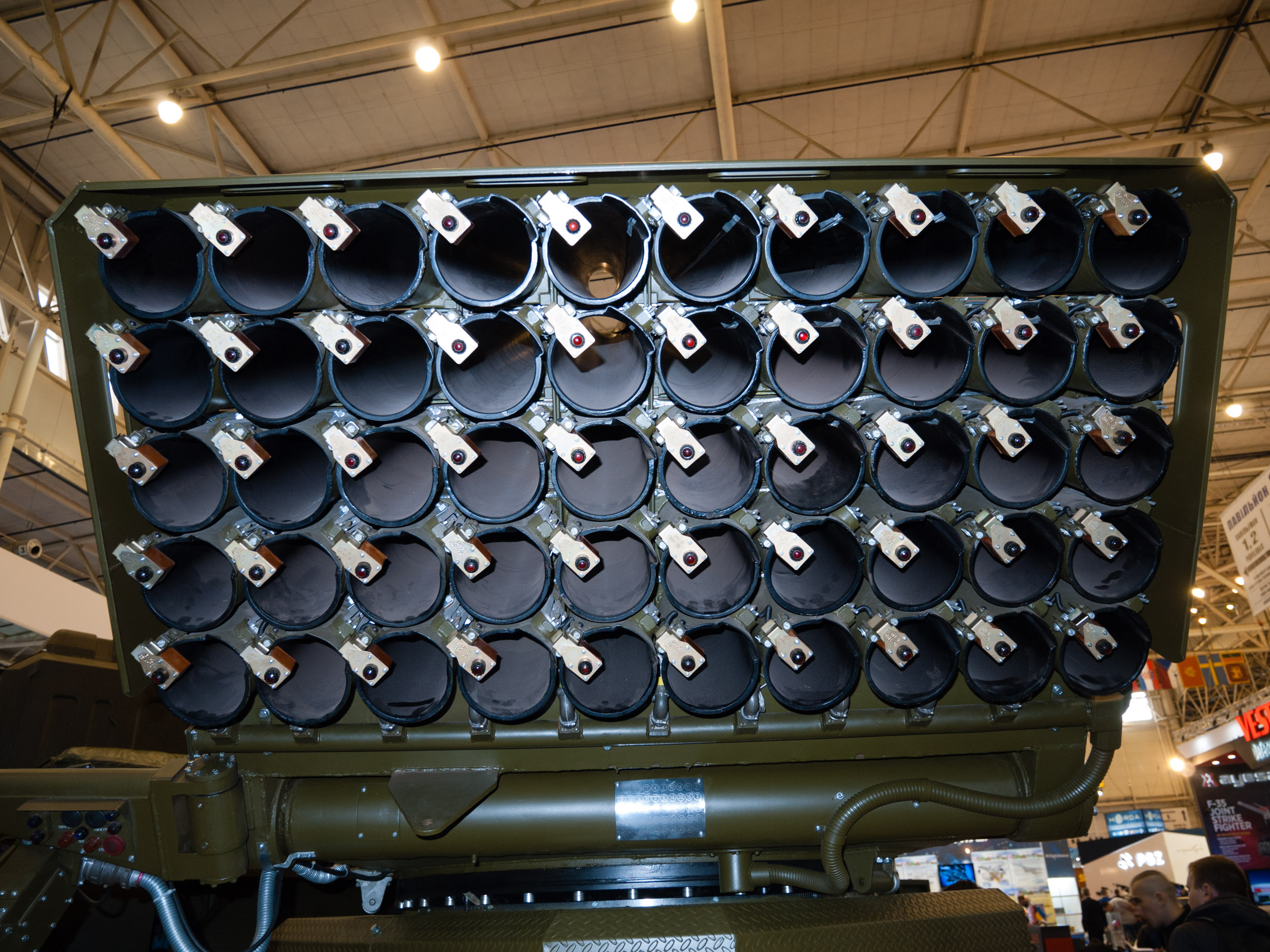
Launcher

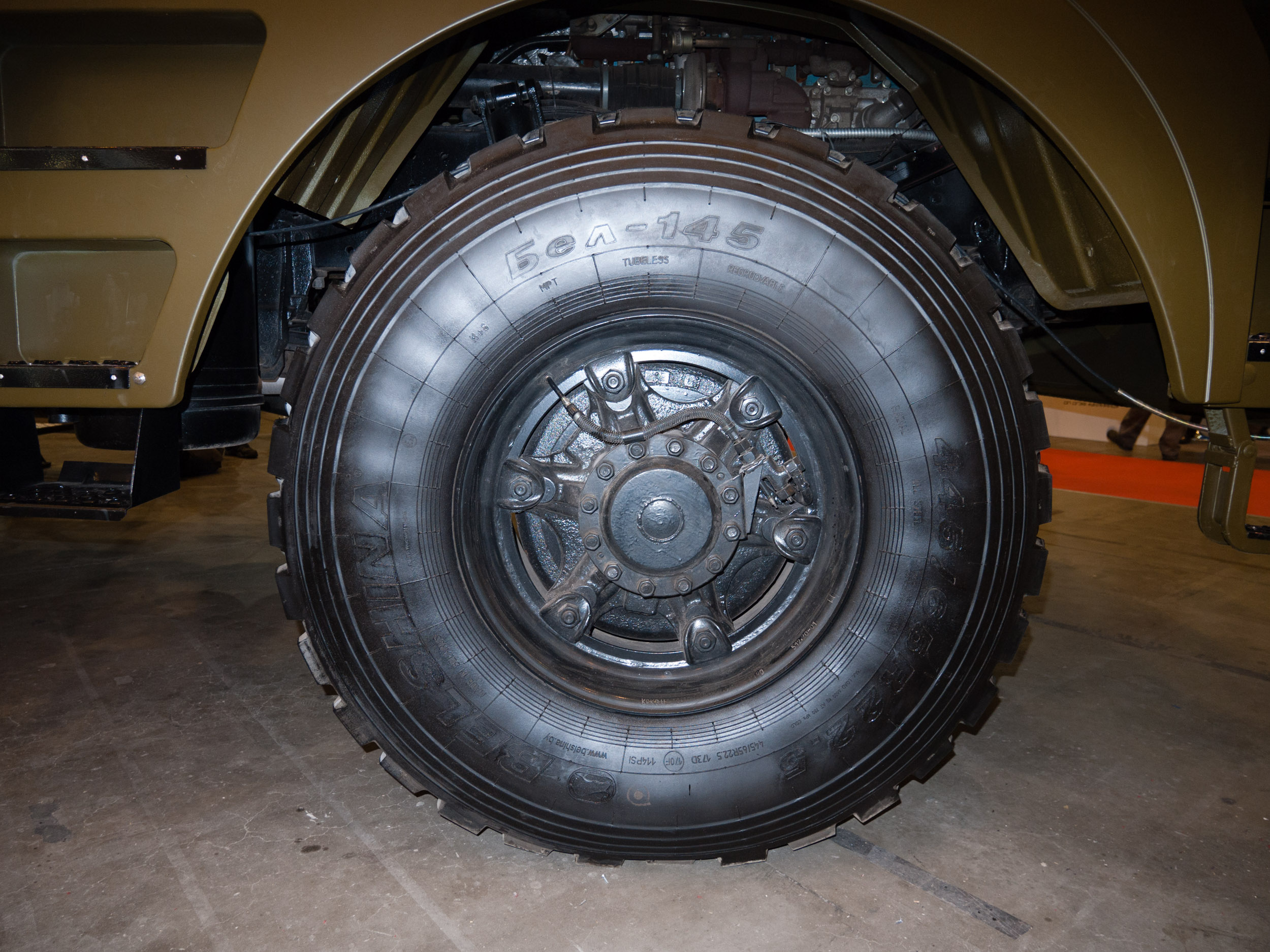
Front wheel

== See also ==
- Verba (MRLS)
