= Sapsan (disambiguation) =

Sapsan may refer to:

- Sapsan, high-speed train in Russia.
- Sapsan Arena, football stadium in Moscow, Russia.
- Hrim-2, Ukrainian tactical ballistic missile, also known as OTRK Sapsan.
