= OTRK =

OTRK may refer to:

- Old Turkic language
- Operatyvno-taktychnyi raketnyi kompleks (Ukrainian), and Operativno-taktichesky raketny kompleks (Russian) for "operational-tactical missile complex", which for example may refer to:
  - Hrim-2 Ukrainian tactical ballistic missile, also called the OTRK Sapsan
  - 9K720 Iskander, a Russian missile system
  - OTR-23 Oka, a Soviet-era missile system
- National Television and Radio Broadcasting Corporation (NTRK) of Kyrgyzstan, formerly Public Broadcasting Corporation (OTRK)
