= Otaman 6x6 =

Ukrainian armoured fighting vehicle

Otaman
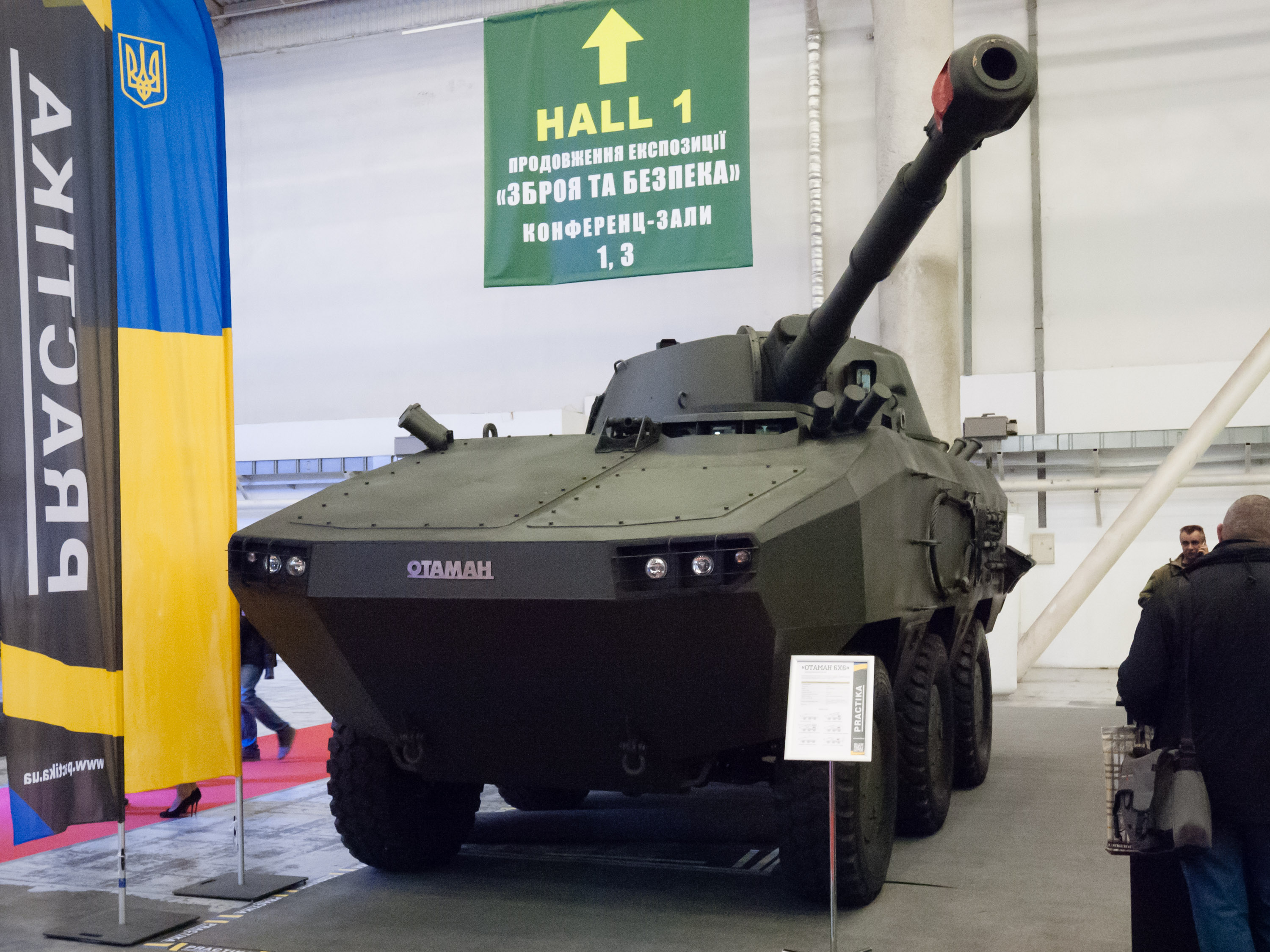
- Ukrainian Otaman 6x6 fire support vehicle
- Type: Armoured fighting vehicle
- Place of origin: Ukraine

Production history
- Designer: Practika

Specifications
- Mass: 16,000 kg (35,000 lb)
- Length: 6.7 m (22 ft)
- Width: 2.66 m (8.7 ft)
- Height: 2.45 m (8.0 ft)
- Crew: 12 soldiers (crew members included)
- Armor: STANAG level 4 ballistic armour
- Main armament: 122 mm 2A18 howitzer
- Secondary armament: 30mm ZTM-1 (2A72) cannon with 400 rounds
- Engine: Iveco diesel (320 HP)
- Transmission: Allisson, (6+1) automatic
- Operational range: 750 km (470 mi)
- Maximum speed: 95 km/h (59 mph)

The Otaman 6x6 is an armoured fighting vehicle produced by the Ukrainian manufacturer NGO Practika and presented for the first time at the Indian Defexpo in 2016, followed by the Otaman 8x8 in the Arms and Security Exhibition held in Kyiv in 2017. This armoured fighting vehicle (AFV) can also be used as an armoured personnel carrier (APC), an infantry fighting vehicle (IFV), and as an ambulance.

== Description ==
The Otaman 6x6 is based on the BTR-60 APC. It is powered by a single 320 hp engine and has a torque of 1250 N⋅m. It has a length of 6.7 metres (22 ft) and it weighs 16 tons. It can carry three members of the crew (commander, driver and gunner) and ten army personnel.

It is an agile APC, like the BTR-80 but with more firepower, because of the 122 mm howitzer that it has as the primary armament. This gun has an operational range of about 10–15 km (6.2–9.3 mi) and can also heavily damage tanks while moving with precision, allowing it to be used as a tank destroyer.

== Armament ==
The Otaman 6x6 is armed with a Soviet 122 mm self-propelled 2A18 howitzer as the primary weapon. As the secondary weapon, it has a 30mm ZTM-1 (2A72) cannon with 400 rounds or a 14.5 mm heavy machine gun. The primary weapon can also be used as a remotely controlled gun.
