= Dnipro (surface-to-air missile) =

Ukrainian surface-to-air missile

- Type: Surface-to-air missile
- Place of origin: Ukraine

Service history
- In service: In testing
- Used by: Ukrainian Navy

Production history
- Designer: Ukroboronservice
- Designed: 2014
- Manufacturer: Luch Design Bureau
- Produced: 2016-present
- Variants: Ship-platform variant Land-platform variant

Dnipro is Ukrainian prospective surface-to-air missile of middle range. It was supposed to be mounted on Volodymyr Velykyi-class corvettes.

The designer, Ukroboronservice, also developed the land-platform variant for this missiles.

On December 1, 2016, a message about successful launches of cruise missiles Neptune and anti-aircraft missiles Dnipro at a training range in the southern of Ukraine was posted.

== Tactical and technical characteristics ==
- The maximum detection range of a target type of a tactical fighter:
  - at an altitude of 7 km - not less than 150 km;
  - at an altitude of 0,15 km - not less than 50 km;
  - at an altitude of 0.02 km - not less than 28 km;
- Range of steady escort of tactical fighter - 120 km;
- Minimum height of target damage is 0.015 km;
- Maximum defeat height of the target is 25 km;
- Time of preparation (inclusion) of the complex for combat work - no more than 4 minutes.

== Producers ==
Medium range SAM "Dnipro" is a product of joint venture of Ukrainian defense enterprises:

- Iskra SPC (multipurpose radar missile launching station) — Zaporizhia;
- SPP Aerotehnics-MLT (the station of combat control) — Kyiv;
- Luch Design Bureau (rockets) — Kyiv;
- DP LINDRTI (GSN developer) — Lviv;
- KrAZ (chassis) — Kremenchuk.
- Ukroboronservice (General project management)

== See also ==
- Volodymyr Velykyi-class corvette
- Neptune (cruise missile)
- Hrim (missile system)
- Dnepr (rocket)

== Links ==
- "ЗРК "Дніпро" - новий комплекс для ППО". defence-ua.com. Defense Express. 2017-01-30.
- "Future Arsenal: SAM Dnipro". uprom.info. National Industrial Portal. 2018-01-23.
- "Ukraine will develop new surface-to-air missile system". quwa.org. 2017-01-09.
- "Ukraine To Develop New Air Defense Missile System". www.defenseworld.net. 2017-01-09.
- "Ukraine completing development of its mobile Dnipro SAM launcher system". defence-ua.com. Defense Express. 2016-03-28.
