= Farsight Vision =

Ukrainian-Estonian defense technology company

- Industry: Defense technology
- Incorporated: Ukraine; Estonia
- Founded: 2023; 3 years ago, Ukraine
- Headquarters: Ukraine
- Key people: Viktoriia Yaremchuk; Volodymyr Nepiuk
- Products: Software and hardware for UAV data processing, geospatial analysis, and 3D terrain modeling
- Website: fsv.global

Farsight Vision is a Ukrainian-Estonian defense technology company founded in 2023 that develops software and electronic hardware for battlefield intelligence and situational awareness, with a focus on geospatial analysis and 3D terrain modeling from UAV data. The company is a member of several defense technology clusters, including Brave1, IRON Cluster, and Techosystem Defense.

Since 2024, its technologies have been used by Ukraine's Defence Forces — including the Armed Forces, the National Guard, the National Police, and the State Border Guard Service — in the context of the ongoing Russo-Ukrainian War.

== History ==
Farsight Vision was founded in 2023 by Viktoriia Yaremchuk and Volodymyr Nepiuk, who met while studying at the Lviv Business School of UCU (part of the Ukrainian Catholic University). The original concept focused on 3D modeling and mapping enemy trenches, based on requests from the Security and Defense Forces of Ukraine to better understand the structure of Russian fortifications for operational planning. By February 2024, the company's solutions were already being deployed on the front lines, and by May 2024, it had completed its first sales. The company is officially registered in both Ukraine and Estonia.

In the summer of 2024, Farsight Vision participated in the five-day Extreme Bootcamp program held in Ukraine and organised by the investor coalition Darkstar for defense technology startups. According to Ragnar Sass, co-founder of the coalition, Farsight Vision was highly regarded among the participants of the bootcamp. In September 2024, the company secured €600,000 in investment from Darkstar. This funding followed earlier backing from the Freedom Fund VC and a pair of angel investors.

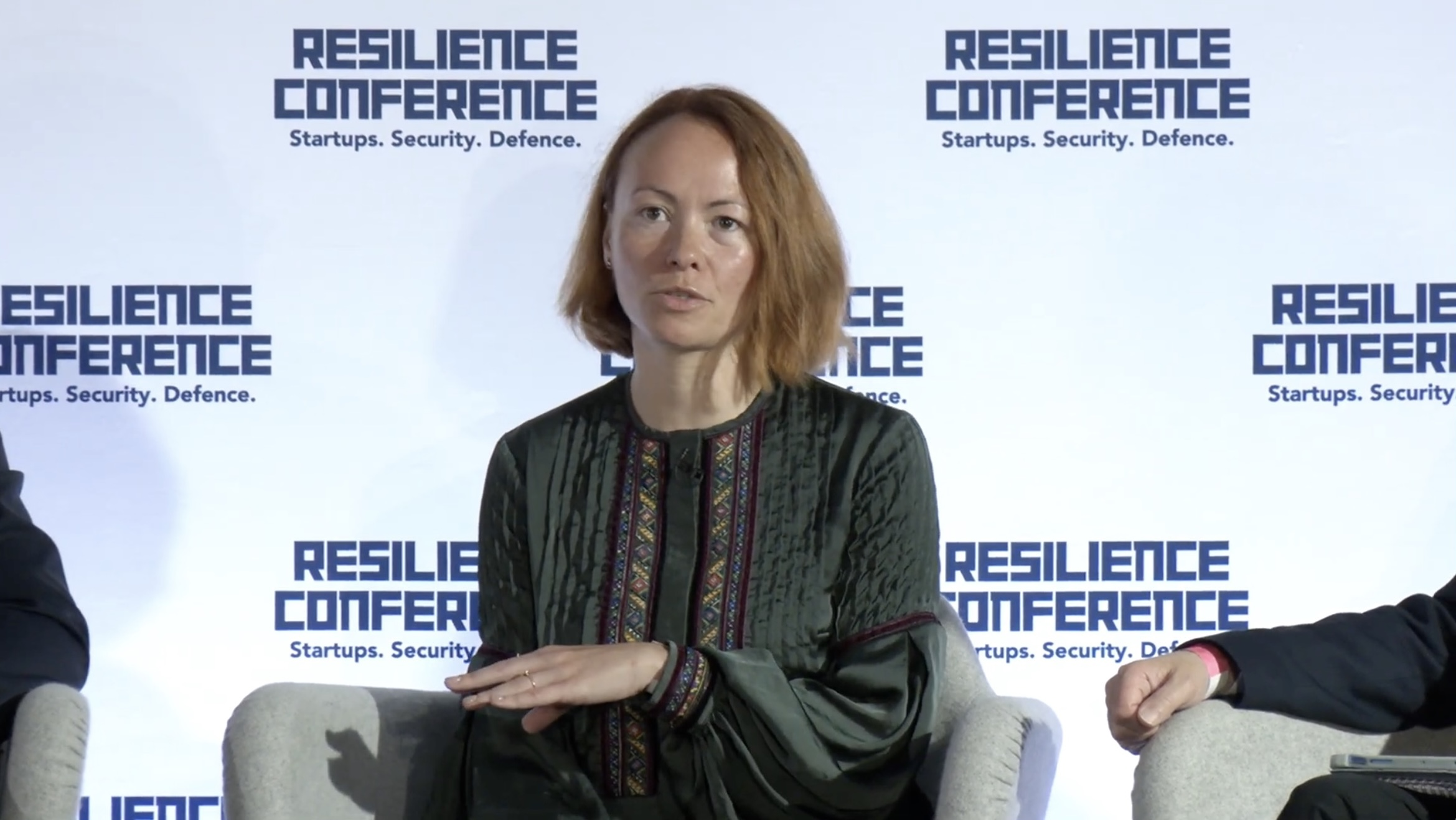
Viktoriia Yaremchuk (CEO) at the Resilience Conference 2024 in London, September 2024

In late September 2024, the company was represented at the Resilience Conference in London. Later, Farsight Vision signed a memorandum of cooperation with the Ukrainian Humanitarian Demining Center. In May 2025, the company presented its solutions at the DSEI Japan defense technology exhibition in Japan, as part of cooperation between the Brave1 defense tech cluster and the Japanese company Rakuten, which supports the entry of Ukrainian startups into the Japanese market.

In spring 2025, the company's technologies were first used during military exercises in Estonia, and in June of the same year, they were included in the online military training course "Using Technology in Wartime," developed by the Ukrainian project Victory Drones. In November 2025, Farsight Vision was nominated for the Future Unicorn Award 2026 by the European trade association DigitalEurope in the dual-use technology category.

== Products ==
The company develops hardware and software for collecting, processing, and analyzing media data obtained from drones, including in electronic warfare environments. FSV Mapper is an autonomous device that pre-processes media files and transmits them to the situational awareness platform; it's designed to work in environments with unstable connectivity. FSV Navigator is a navigation module mounted on a drone, designed to aid route stability in GPS-denied conditions.

=== FSV Platform ===
FSV Platform is a geospatial analytics and situational awareness platform that converts photo and video materials captured in electronic warfare environments into precise orthophotos and 3D models of terrain (so-called "digital twins"), with an accuracy of 5–7 cm per pixel. The results are displayed as layers on a digital map and available through a VR application.

The platform automatically detects objects and changes in terrain and integrates with situational awareness and battlefield management systems such as Delta, Kropyva, Combat Vision, MilChat, and TacticMap.
