= ZBROYARI: Manufacturing Freedom =

ZBROYARI: Manufacturing Freedom is a global fundraising campaign launched by the Ministry of Strategic Industries of Ukraine and supported by the Office of the President of Ukraine, the Ministry of Defense of Ukraine, and the Ministry of Foreign Affairs of Ukraine. Its goal is to raise US$10 billion for the production of Ukrainian weapons in 2024.

== History ==
The ZBROYARI project was first presented by the Minister of Strategic Industries of Ukraine, Oleksandr Kamyshin, in April 2024. At that time, he estimated the production capacity of Ukraine's rapidly growing defense-industrial complex at around $20 billion, while the Ukrainian government was capable of purchasing a maximum of only $6 billion worth of the weapons being produced. Kamyshin introduced the ZBROYARI project as a short-term solution and a practical way for donor countries to help Ukraine fully realize the potential of its defense-industrial complex amid a shortage of weapons and ammunition, delays in their supply, and the establishment of production by Ukraine's international partners.

The first country to allocate funds for the purchase of Ukrainian weapons for the Ukrainian military was Denmark. On April 16, 2024, the Kingdom of Denmark announced the allocation of 200 million Danish kroner ($28.5 million) for the purchase of weapons and military equipment from Ukrainian manufacturers for the Armed Forces of Ukraine.

On April 26, 2024, Canada allocated 3 million Canadian dollars ($2.1 million) for the production of Ukrainian drones.

On May 15, 2024, during a visit to Ukraine, U.S. Secretary of State Antony Blinken announced that the United States would provide an additional $2 billion for the production of domestic weapons.

On June 10, 2024, the Netherlands announced the allocation of €60 million for the purchase of drones for Ukraine. Of this amount, €20 million was allocated for FPV drones as part of an international drone coalition, €22.5 million for Dutch drones, and €17.5 million for Ukrainian-made naval drones.

On June 18, 2024, Denmark announced an expansion of support for Ukrainian arms manufacturers by an additional 1.2 billion Danish kroner—approximately $170 million. Denmark thus became the first country to donate to the ZBROYARI project for the second time.
