= List of design bureaus in Ukraine =

Ukraine has several well developed design bureaus that were inherited from the Soviet Union. Many of them are party of the state Ukrainian defense industry complex Ukroboronprom.

== Rockets and space ==
- Yuzhnoye Design Bureau of Yangel (Dnipro), specialization in rockets
- Luch Design Bureau (LUCH)

== Vehicles ==
- Kharkiv Design Bureau of Morozov (Kharkiv), specialization in armored vehicles
- Kharkiv Design Bureau in engine construction (Kharkiv, website), specialization in design of internal combustion engines
- Science-production complex "Fotoprylad" (Cherkasy, website), specialization in optics
- Kyiv Automatics Plant (Kyiv, ), specialization in support technology in various fields for armed forces
- Design Bureau "Artyleriyske ozbroyennya" (Kyiv, website), specialization in artillery guns design

== Aviation ==
- Antonov State Company, specialization in large aircraft
- Progress Design Bureau of Ivchenko (Zaporizhzhia), specialization in aviation engines
- Kharkiv Aggregate Design Bureau (Kharkiv, website), specialization in supporting systems for aviation and rocket technologies
- Research-design bureau of general purpose aviation (Petropavlivska Borshchahivka, Bucha Raion)

== Radars ==
- Science-production complex Iskra (Spark) (Zaporizhzhia, website), specialization in radiolocating capabilities (Radiolocation)

== Shipbuilding ==
- Central Design Bureau Izumrud (Kherson)
- State Research and Design Shipbuilding Center (Mykolaiv, website), specialization in ship design
- Zorya-Mashproekt science production complex of gas turbine building (Mykolaiv, website), specialization in ship engines
- Kyi Science-research Institute of Hydrodevices (Kyiv, website), specialization in hydro devices

== Various general research institutes ==
- Ukrainian science-research institute of aviation technology (Kyiv, website)
- Ukrainian State science-research institute of construction materials "Prometei" (Mariupol)
