= Electronic hardware =

Interconnected electronic components

Electronic hardware (HW) consists of interconnected electronic components which perform analog or logic operations on received and locally stored information to produce as output, store resulting new information or provide control for output actuator mechanisms.

Electronic hardware can range from individual chips/circuits to distributed information processing systems. Well-designed electronic hardware is composed of hierarchies of functional modules which inter-communicate via precisely defined interfaces.

Hardware logic is primarily a differentiation of the data-processing circuitry from other more generalized circuitry. For example, nearly all computers include a power supply which consists of circuitry not involved in data processing but rather powering the data processing circuits. Similarly, a computer may output information to a computer monitor or audio amplifier which is also not involved in the computational processes.

== See also ==
- Digital electronics
