= M4-WAC-47 =

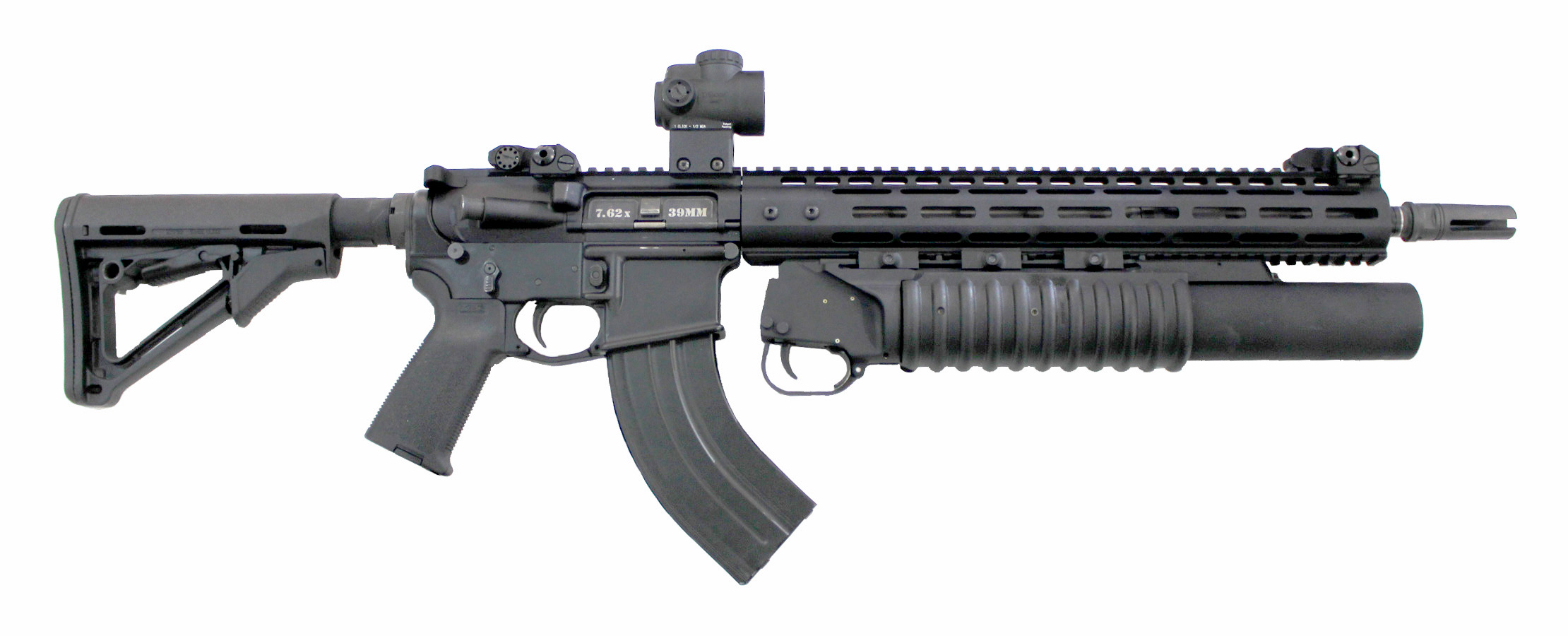
- M4-WAC-47, equipped with an underbarrel M203 grenade launcher
- Type: Assault rifle
- Place of origin: Ukraine/United States

Service history
- In service: 2017–present
- Used by: Ukrainian Ground Forces; State Border Guard Service of Ukraine
- Wars: Russo-Ukrainian war

Production history
- Manufacturer: Ukroboronprom; Aeroscraft

Specifications
- Mass: 3.4 kg (7.5 lb)
- Barrel length: 400 mm (16 in)
- Cartridge: 7.62×39mm 5.56×45mm NATO.458 SOCOM
- Action: Gas-operated, closed rotating bolt, Stoner expanding gas
- Rate of fire: 850 rounds/min
- Effective firing range: 400 m (440 yd)
- Feed system: 30-round box magazines

The M4-WAC-47 is a Ukrainian-made assault rifle created by UkrOboronProm and American company Aeroscraft (a division of Worldwide Aeros Corporation).

== Development ==
Based on the Colt AR-15 platform, it can fire the Soviet standard 7.62×39mm or the NATO standard 5.56×45mm cartridges by changing the barrel and other parts.

It was tested within different sections of the Ukrainian Ground Forces and Border Guard, with testing estimated to have been completed in late April 2018.

== Gallery ==
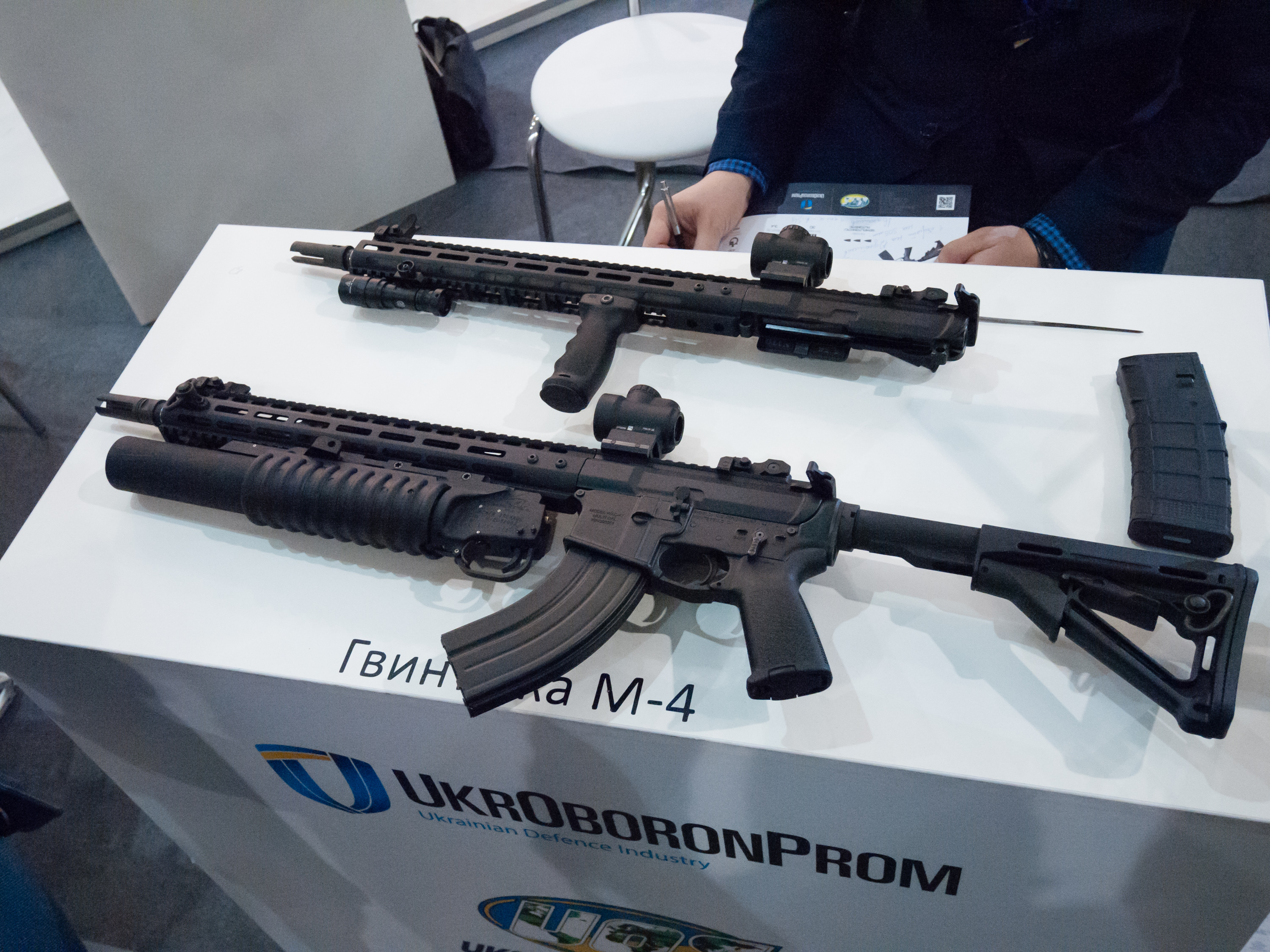
An M4-WAC-47 on display at the Kyiv office of the Ukrainian Defence Industry (UkrOboronProm).
