= Volodymyr Velykyi-class frigate =

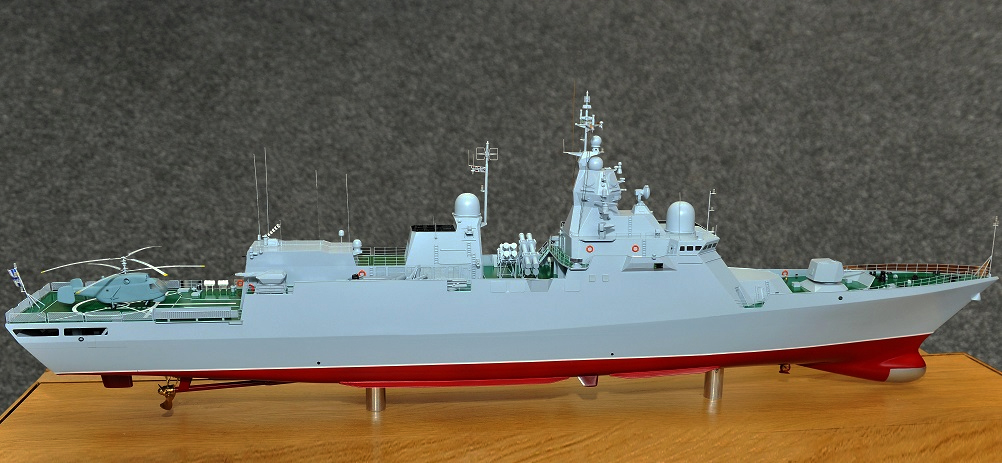
- Frigate project 58250

Class overview
- Name: Project 58250 (Volodymyr Velykyi class)
- Builders: Black Sea Shipyard
- Operators: Ukrainian Navy
- Built: 2011-2021
- Planned: 4
- Completed: 0
- Canceled: 4

General characteristics
- Type: Frigate
- Displacement: 2,500-2,650 tonnes
- Length: 100–112 m (328 ft 1 in – 367 ft 5 in)
- Beam: 13.50 m (44 ft 3 in)
- Draught: 3.50 m (11 ft 6 in)
- Speed: 30 knots (56 km/h; 35 mph) (planned)
- Range: 4,000 mi (6,400 km) at 14 knots (26 km/h; 16 mph)
- Complement: 110
- Sensors & processing systems: long-range 3D radar; medium range 3D radar; battle actions ACS; Long range radar for RWC; Radar AF control system; Sarmat (optoelectronic system); Undercutting GAS and GAS with long drawn antenna
- Electronic warfare & decoys: RTO and EW system
- Armament: 1 × 76 mm/62 OTO Melara (SR); 1 × dual 35 mm Oerlikon Millennium; 2 × 4-cell Neptune; 16 ×-cell Dnipro (in VLS cell); 2 × 4 - 324 mm MU90 torpedoes
- Aircraft carried: 1 x NH90 NFH or; 1 x Ka-27PL

The Volodymyr Velykyi class or Project 58250 was a planned class of small frigates (previously envisioned as multipurpose corvettes) ordered for the Ukrainian Navy.

== Background and development ==
Before starting this project in 2002 the State Research and Design Shipbuilding Center has developed a multi-purpose corvette "Hajduk-21" for Leninska Kuznia as replacement and continuation of the Soviet Grisha-class corvettes (small anti-submarine vessels), but the Ministry of Defense declined the project. It was decided to double the displacement and make a ship be compatible with the NATO ships. On the initiative of the minister of defense Anatoliy Hrytsenko, on 9 August 2005 the Cabinet of Ukraine issued an order on development of the new ship. For development of the new ship there were allotted some ₴805 million.

The new ship was projected to be a little bigger than a corvette, but smaller than a frigate. The new project was developed in 2008 by State Research and Design Shipbuilding Center. From the beginning of program there was discussion of about 10 such ships. It was planned to start the construction at the Black Sea Shipyard that belongs to Smart Holding Group with a Russian capital (Smart Holding belongs to Vadym Novynskyi). During the Soviet times, at the shipyard were built aircraft carriers. Placing the construction of the project at the shipyard had speculated from a get go on the risk of breaking the deadlines (which soon has been realized).

== Construction ==
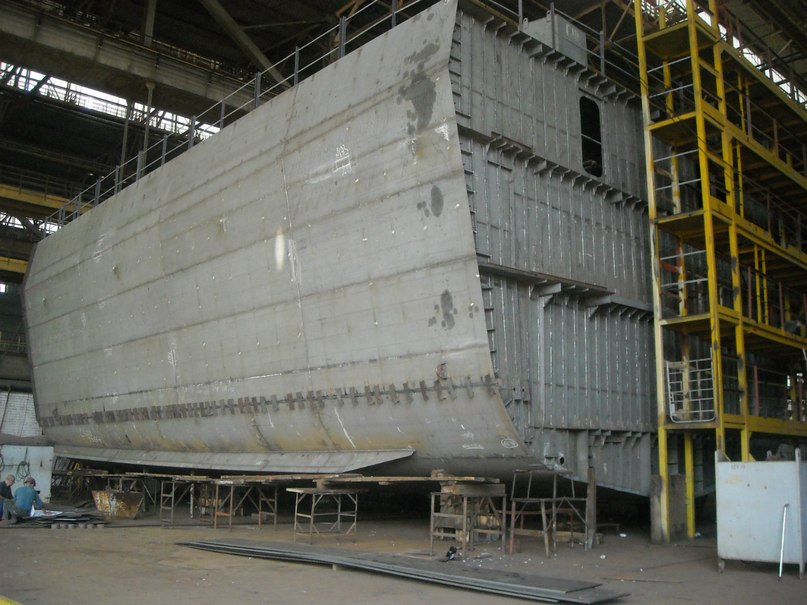
Volodymyr Velykyi under construction at Black Sea Shipyard

Construction started as planned in 2011 with planned launching in 2012. The project suffered many delays and was stopped in 2014 due to Russian military intervention.

At the end of 2017 work it was announced about resuming of construction with adoption of new version of shipbuilding program which plans to commission first ship in 2022, second in 2024, third in 2026, fourth in 2028. In spring of 2018, however, the commander of Ukrainian Navy said that there is no funding to continue construction of the ship.

There also were talks to transfer the construction to other shipyards among which were mentioned Mykolayiv Shipyard (formerly the Shipyard of 61 Communards) and Kuznya na Rybalskomu (former Leninska Kuznya). Those were originally reviewed as possible candidates.

Due to the refusal of selling of anti-ship missiles from European Union, there is a program of developing the own anti-ship missile that called Neptune (first tests in 2016) and anti-air missiles that called Dnipro (first tests in 2016).

The first ship was named after Volodymyr the Great. In 2021, the Ukrainian Ministry of Defence announced it would be completed as a frigate.

Due to high level of corruption associated with state procurement in Ukraine, a lack of funding, and the poor condition of the Black Sea Shipyard, in 2020 Ukraine ordered two Turkish Ada-class corvettes with an option for additional vessels that could be built in Ukrainian shipyards.

The Black Sea Shipyard responsible for the program went bankrupt in 2021, after ten years of construction the sole ship of the class was only 17% complete.

== Ships ==
Name	Builder	Hull number	Laid down	Launched	Commissioned	Fleet	Status
Volodymyr Velykyi	Black Sea Shipyard	01701	17 May 2011		Planned for 2024	Ukrainian Navy	Construction abandoned
(Unnamed)	Black Sea Shipyard				Planned for 2026	Ukrainian Navy	Canceled
(Unnamed)	Black Sea Shipyard				Planned for 2028	Ukrainian Navy	Canceled
(Unnamed)	Black Sea Shipyard				Planned for 2030	Ukrainian Navy	Canceled

== See also ==
- Gawron-class corvette
- List of active Ukrainian Navy ships
