= Verba (MRLS) =

Ukrainian multiple rocket launcher

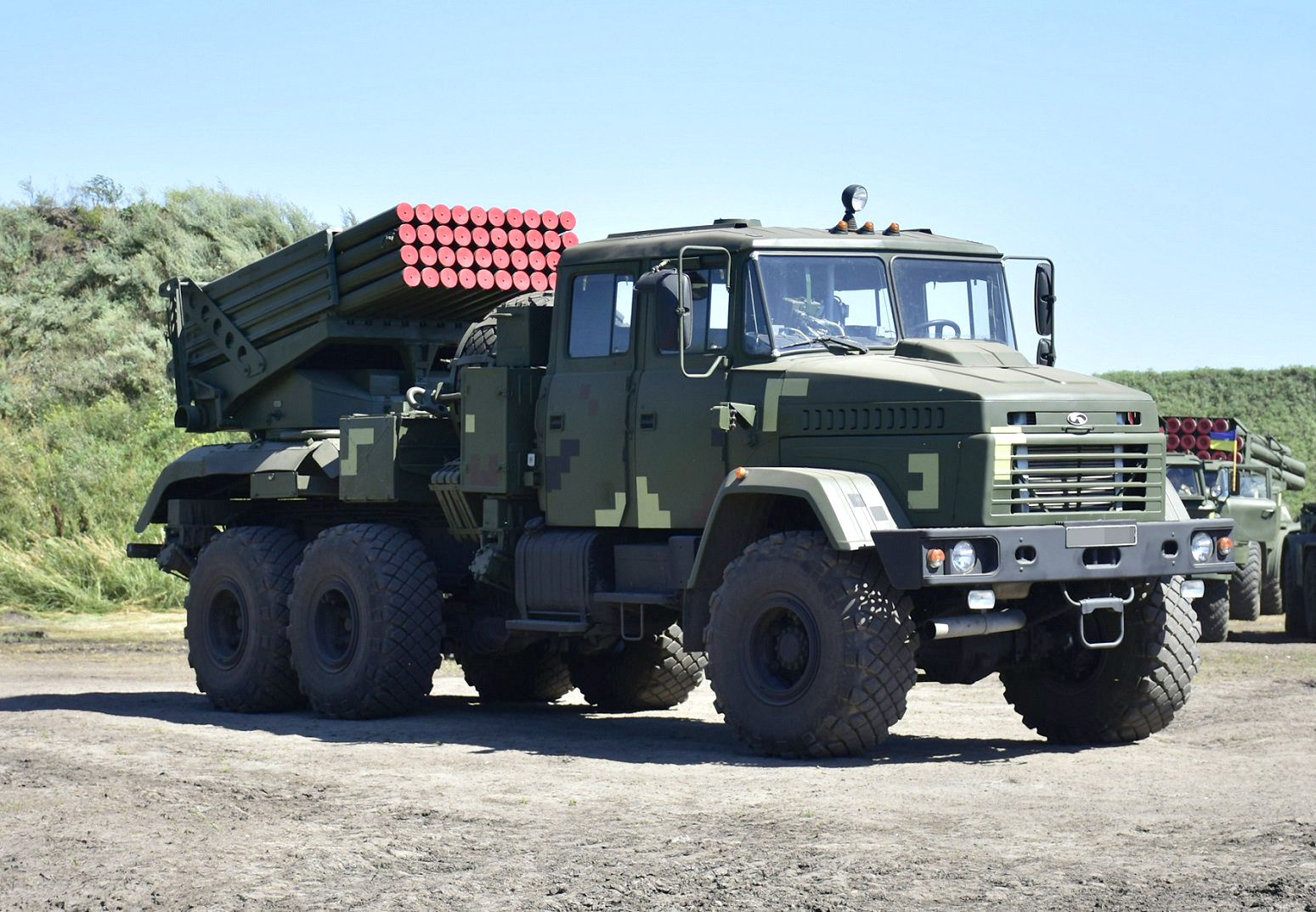
- Verba MRLS
- Type: Multiple rocket launcher
- Place of origin: Ukraine

Service history
- In service: 2019 – present
- Used by: See Operators
- Wars: 2022 Russian invasion of Ukraine

Production history
- Designer: Kharkiv Morozov Machine Building Design Bureau
- Designed: 2015
- Manufacturer: Shepetivka repair plant
- Produced: 2019 – present

Specifications
- Mass: 20 tonnes (44,092 lbs)
- Crew: 5
- Calibre: 122 mm
- Engine: 330–400
- Suspension: 6×6 wheeled
- Fuel capacity: 80 litres
- Maximum speed: 85 km/h

"Verba" is a Ukrainian multiple rocket launcher 122 mm caliber based on the truck KrAZ-6322 and combat unit BM-21 Grad. Presented in 2015 by Kharkiv Morozov Machine Building Design Bureau. The launcher has received a number of improvements over the BM-21 Grad: navigation, communication, alignment and stabilization of the platform. A loading machine has also been developed to automate the loading process.

== History ==
In December 2015, Volodymyr Vakulenko, the general designer of the Kharkiv Morozov Machine Building Design Bureau, presented the Verba MLRS and said that it would take 7 months and ₴16 million to complete the system. He also announced the possibility of making an option with an armored cabin from the "Raptor".

On February 21, 2019, the press service of the State Concern Ukroboronprom announced the start of serial production of MLRS "Verba" at SE "Shepetivka Repair Plant". That year it was planned to form the first staff units in the Armed Forces of Ukraine, armed with "Verba".

In November 2019, Colonel Vladislav Shostak announced that MLRS "Verba" was adopted by Ukraine in 2019.

In September 2021, Ukroboronprom re-announced the adoption of MLRS "Verba" for the Ukrainian Ground Forces.

== Description ==
"Verba" is equipped with a double cabin for 5 people, and all guidance, aiming, recharging systems are controlled from the inside.

The total weight of the installation "Verba" - 20 tons. Maximum speed - 85 km / h.

Compared to the BM-21 Grad, reloading time is reduced: BM-21 Grad is recharged after a full launch from one to two hours, depending on the qualifications of the crew, and in MLRS "Verba" reloading a full set of 40 missiles takes 10 minutes. Compared to the standard BM-21, "Verba" has received the following changes:

- The recharging rate increased 7 times;
- Modern navigation systems have reduced the time to open fire on a target in an unfamiliar area by 4 times, compared to the "Grad";
- The transition to the chassis from "KrAZ" allowed not only to eliminate the use of Russian "Urals", but also to increase the passability of the car;
- New leveling and stabilization system of the platform, thanks to which it was possible to significantly improve the accuracy of fire;
- Changed communication system, now all information is transmitted over digital channels in encrypted form.

== Operators ==
- Ukraine: 38 units in the service of the Armed Forces as of 2021.
