= 1KR1 Sapsan =

Ukrainian tactical-operational ballistic missile

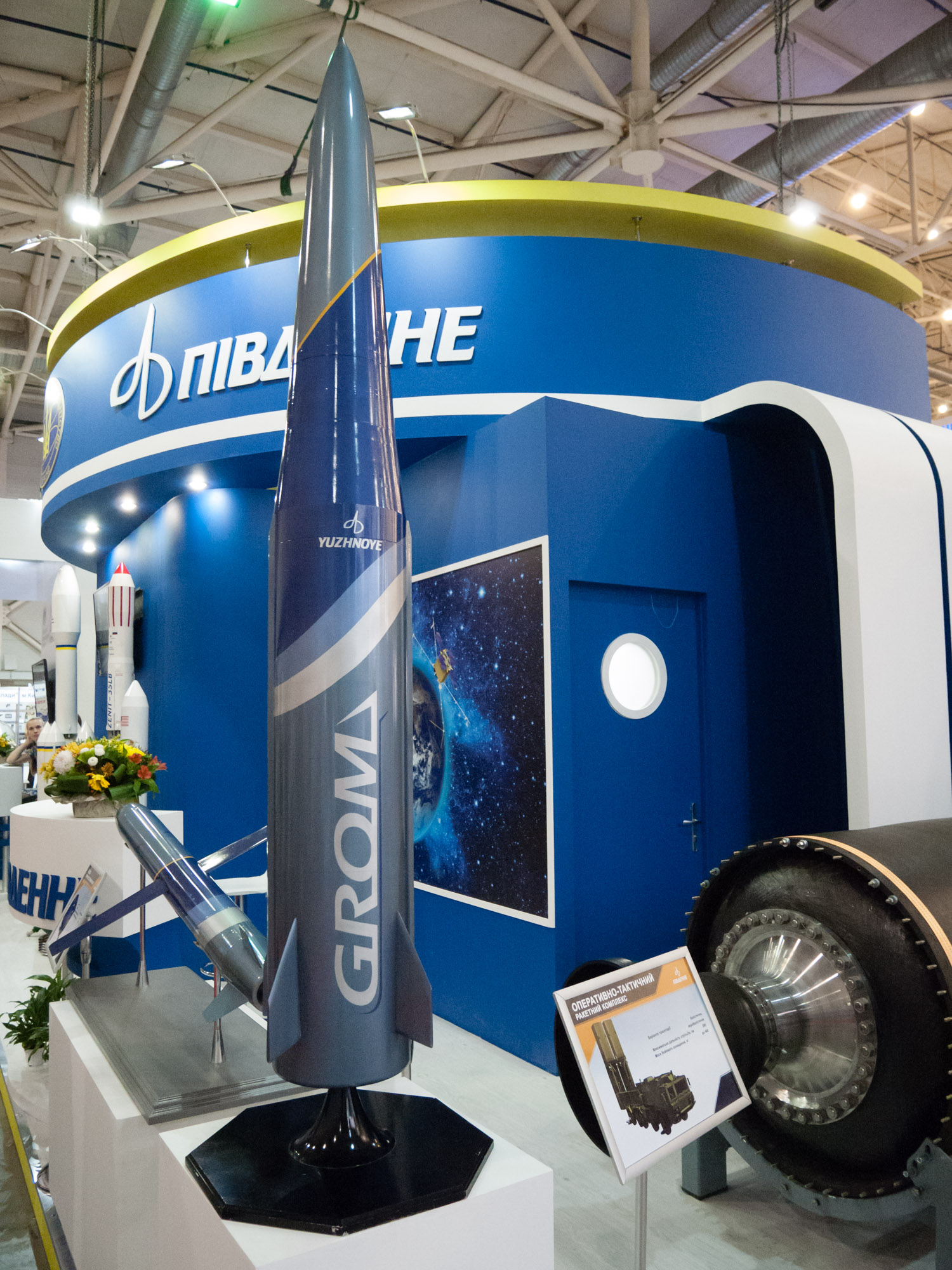
- Scale model of a Sapsan missile on display in 2016
- Type: Tactical ballistic missile
- Place of origin: Ukraine

Service history
- In service: 2025–present
- Used by: Ukrainian Ground Forces

Production history
- Manufacturer: KB Pivdenne

Specifications
- Warhead: 500 kg (1,100 lb)
- Engine: Single-stage solid propellant
- Operational range: 50 km (31 mi) – 400–500 km (250–310 mi); 300 km (190 mi)
- Maximum speed: Mach 7 (1.5 mi/s; 2.4 km/s)

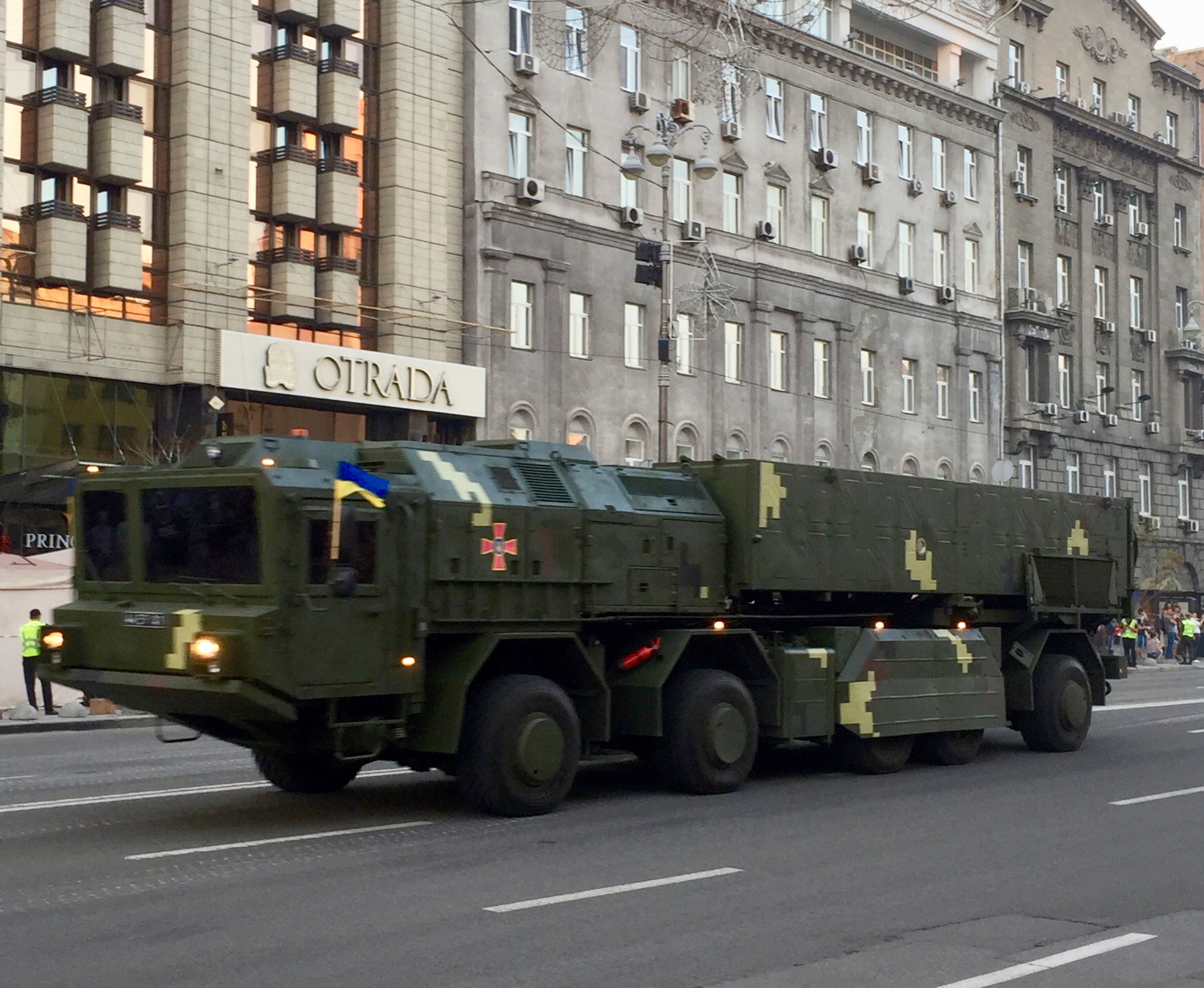
Sapsan transporter erector launcher in rehearsal for parade in 2018

1KR1 Sapsan (Ukrainian: "Сапсан", lit. 'Peregrine falcon'), also known as Grom (Russian: "Гром", lit. 'Thunder'), Grim-2, or Hrіm-2 (Ukrainian: "Грім-2", lit. 'Thunder-2'), is a Ukrainian short-range ballistic missile system being developed by KB Pivdenne and PA Pivdenmash, designed to combine the features of a tactical missile system and a multiple rocket launcher. The original Sapsan version of the missile, for Ukraine's own use, was to have a range of 500 kilometers. A version marketed as Hrim-2, developed for export, has a range limited to 280 kilometers, in order to fall within the 300-kilometre limit set by the Missile Technology Control Regime, which seeks to limit the proliferation of missiles and missile technology.

== History ==
=== Background ===
In 2006, the National Security and Defense Council of Ukraine recognised the need for a missile system that would be better than Ukraine's aging Soviet Tochka-U, which had a maximum range of 120 km and could only be overhauled and upgraded by Russian companies. KB Pivdenne was given the task of developing a new missile designated the "Sapsan". The Ministry of Defence and Pivdenne agreed on operational requirements in September 2007. Funding for the project was halted in 2009–2010, following the 2008 financial crisis, then resumed in November 2011, albeit at a slow pace, before being terminated in 2013.

In 2011, arms dealers started offering foreign customers a new missile system called "Hrim", and after two years, Pivdenne was contracted by an undisclosed country to develop the Hrim-2. In 2014, after the Russo-Ukrainian War had begun, Pivdenne proposed restarting the Sapsan project, using its experience developing the Hrim-2, with a view to having Sapsan ready for evaluation by 2018. The government agreed.

=== Development ===
Work on the Hrim-2 missile system was announced at the Arms and Security exhibition in Kyiv in 2014. In 2016, it was reported that Saudi Arabia had provided US$40 million for the research and development. A photograph of the chassis of a Hrim-2 transporter erector launcher appeared in May 2017; each vehicle could carry and launch two missiles. In April 2019, it was announced that two Hrim-2/Sapsan prototypes had been produced, one for testing by Saudi Arabia and the other to be tested by the Armed Forces of Ukraine. Saudi Arabia was expected to test their test article one later in 2019, with the system planned to enter service in 2022. In October 2020, it was announced that US$300 million would be needed to complete the testing of Ukraine's prototype. In February 2021, the government decided to sign a contract to fund the production of a test battery consisting of two transporter erector launchers, two loading machines, and two control units (one for the battery commander and the other for the division commander). The contract had not yet been signed by April of 2021, but the Ministry of Defense hoped to do so in 2–3 months.

In June 2023, the then Ukraine Minister of Defense Oleksii Reznikov stated that the funds needed for completing the program had been approved and allocated.

In August 2024, Ukraine claimed to have successfully tested its first domestically-produced ballistic missile. While the specific missile-type was not disclosed, some commentators have speculated that the missile being referred to is the Sapsan. On 22 October 2024, Yehor Cherniev, the head of Ukraine's NATO delegation, said that there would soon be "concrete results" from the use of Ukrainian-made ballistic missiles, probably referring to the Sapsan.

On 9 November 2024, President Volodymyr Zelenskyy, during his daily address, talked about Ukrainian domestic production of weapons, specifically having produced “its first 100 missiles” without detailing what kind of missile. It is believed he was referring to Sapsan based on his comments of “striking deeper and deeper into Russia”, although he may also have been referring to other missiles such as the Long Neptune.

The combat testing and serial production was funded by a "five-billion-euro defense package" provided by Germany. The missile system was adopted into Ukrainian service with the index 1KR1 in 2025.

=== Operational history ===
==== Russo-Ukrainian War ====
Several large explosions occurred at Saky airbase at Novofedorivka in Russian-occupied Crimea, 220 km from the frontline, on 9 August 2022. The cause was unclear, but several media outlets discussed the possibility it was a Sapsan missile.

On May 6, 2023, Russian officials claimed that their air defenses shot down two Sapsan missiles over Crimea, without them causing casualties or damage. The Institute for the Study of War, a Washington-based think tank, noted that the officials did not specify the Sapsan's target and that Russian sources amplified footage of alleged Sapsan remnants in a field.

In June 2025, Ukraine claimed to have conducted its first combat test of the Sapsan, at a range of 300 km. According to the Ukrainian government, the missile has entered serial production. The stated range is 300 km (190 mi), reaching speeds of Mach 5.2 (1.1 mi/s; 1.8 km/s) and carrying a 480kg warhead, exceeding the capabilities of the ATACMS ballistic missile and placing it close to those of the 9K720 Iskander.

On 14 August 2025, the FSB and Russian Armed Forces claimed to have destroyed Sapsan missile production sites, “eliminating both the threat of Ukrainian missile strikes deep inside Russian territory and the 'technical base' for the missile’s production capacity”. On December 9 of the same year, President Zelenskyy stated that Ukraine was already using domestically produced Sapsan missiles: "Ukraine is already using the Neptune, the long-range Neptune, the Palyanytsya, the Flamingo. And also, the Sapsan, I’ll be honest – we’ve begun using it," also adding that "There are many moments when our enemy believes that Neptunes were used. And let them keep thinking that".

== Gallery ==
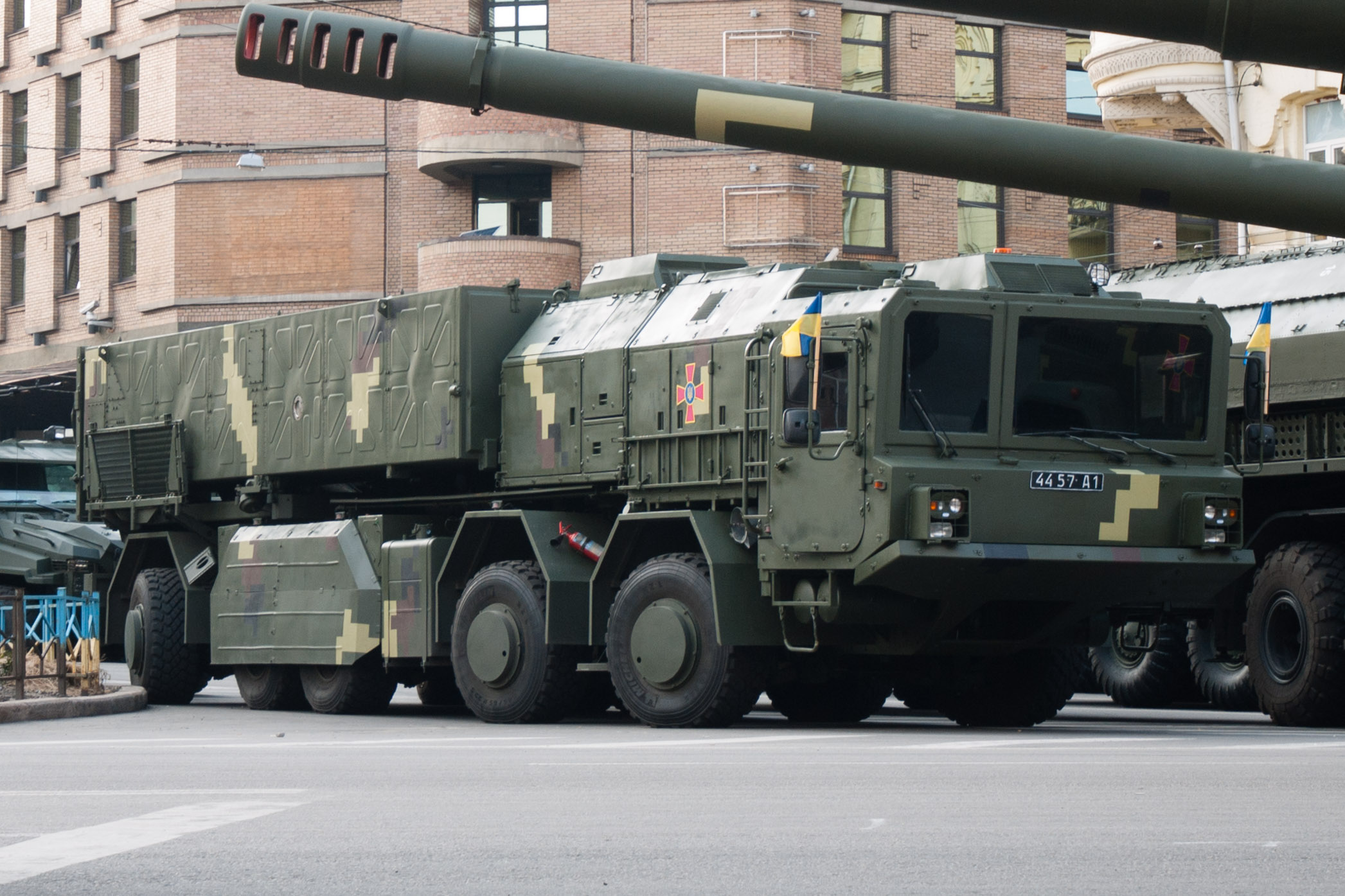

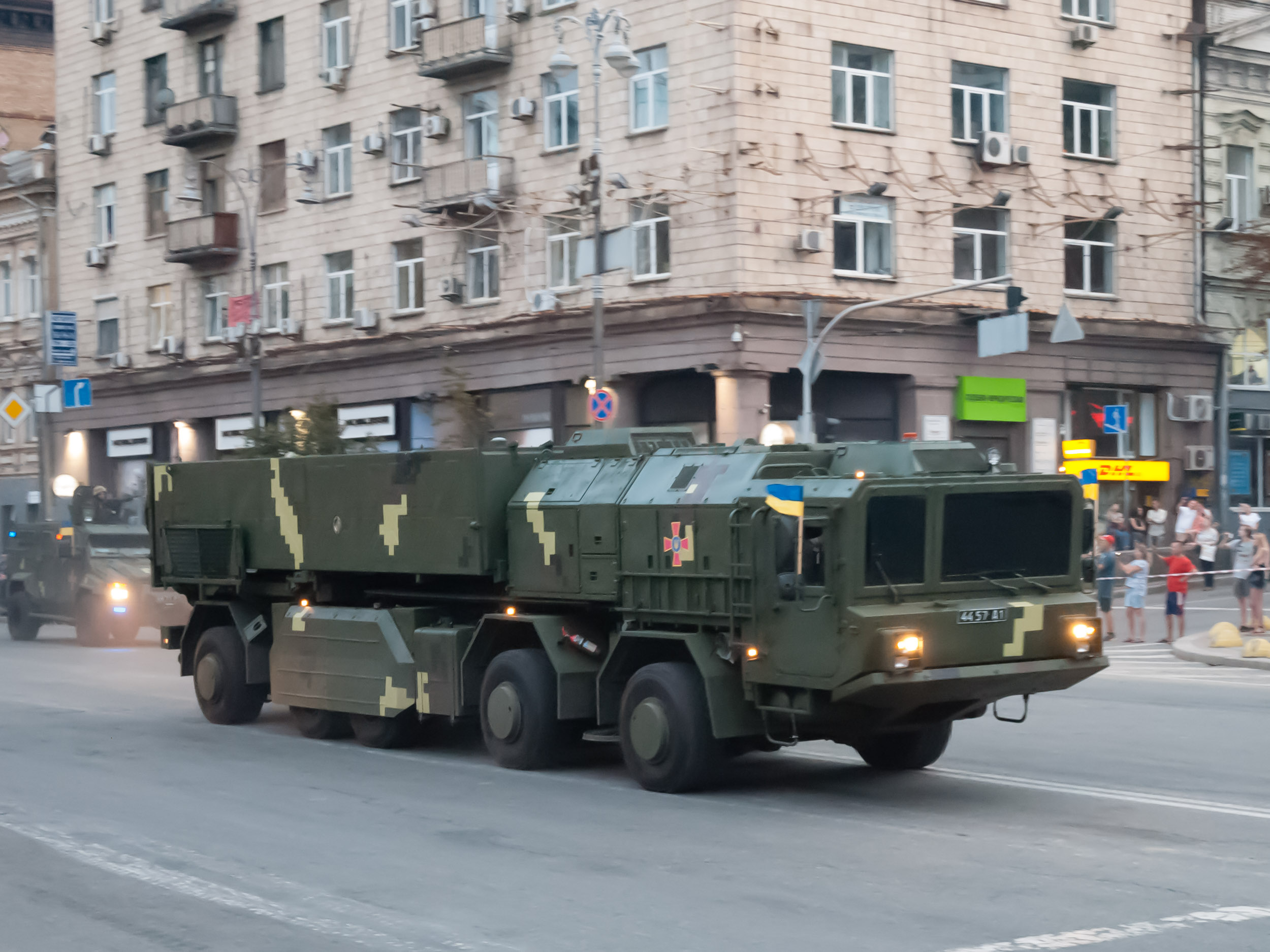

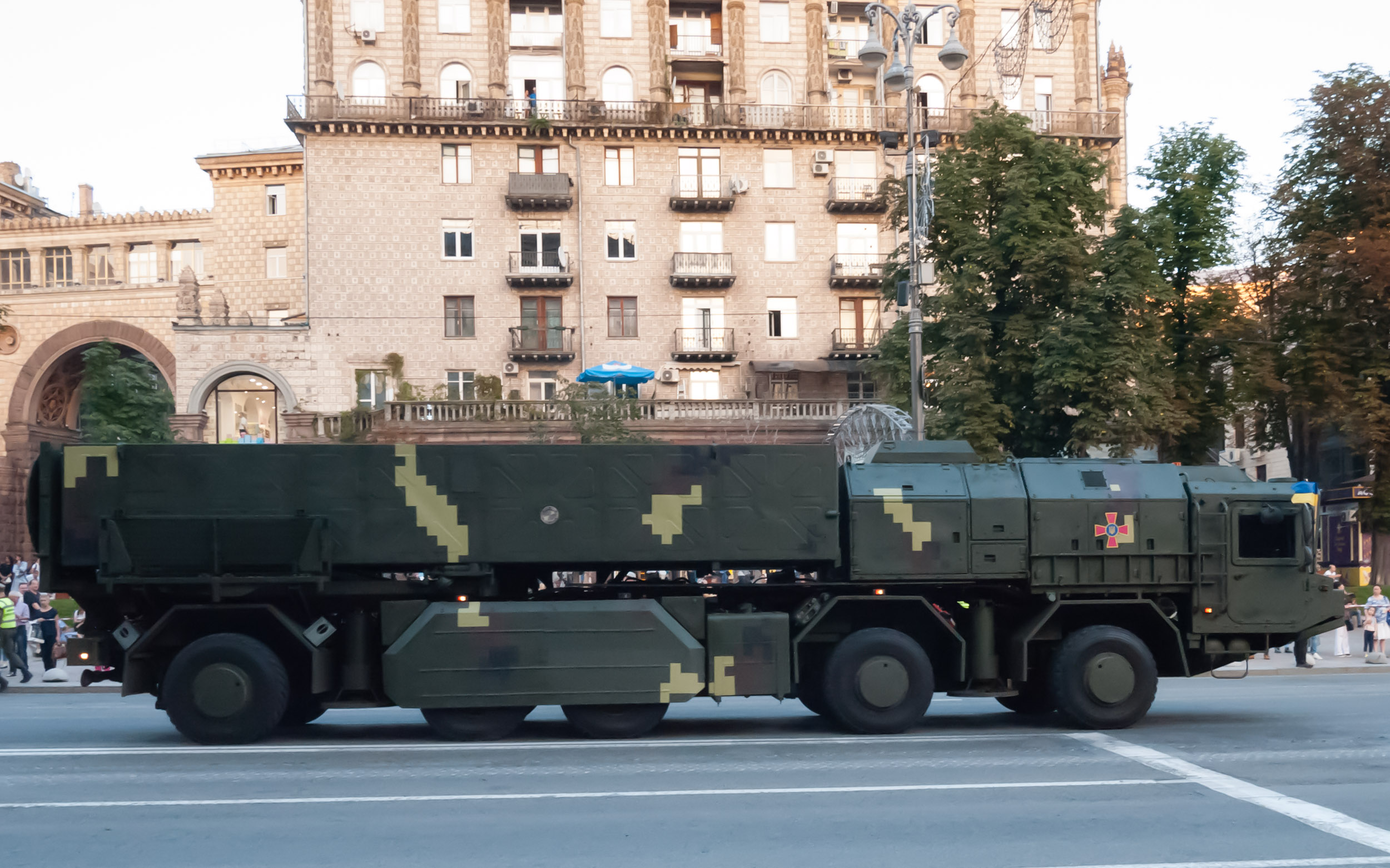

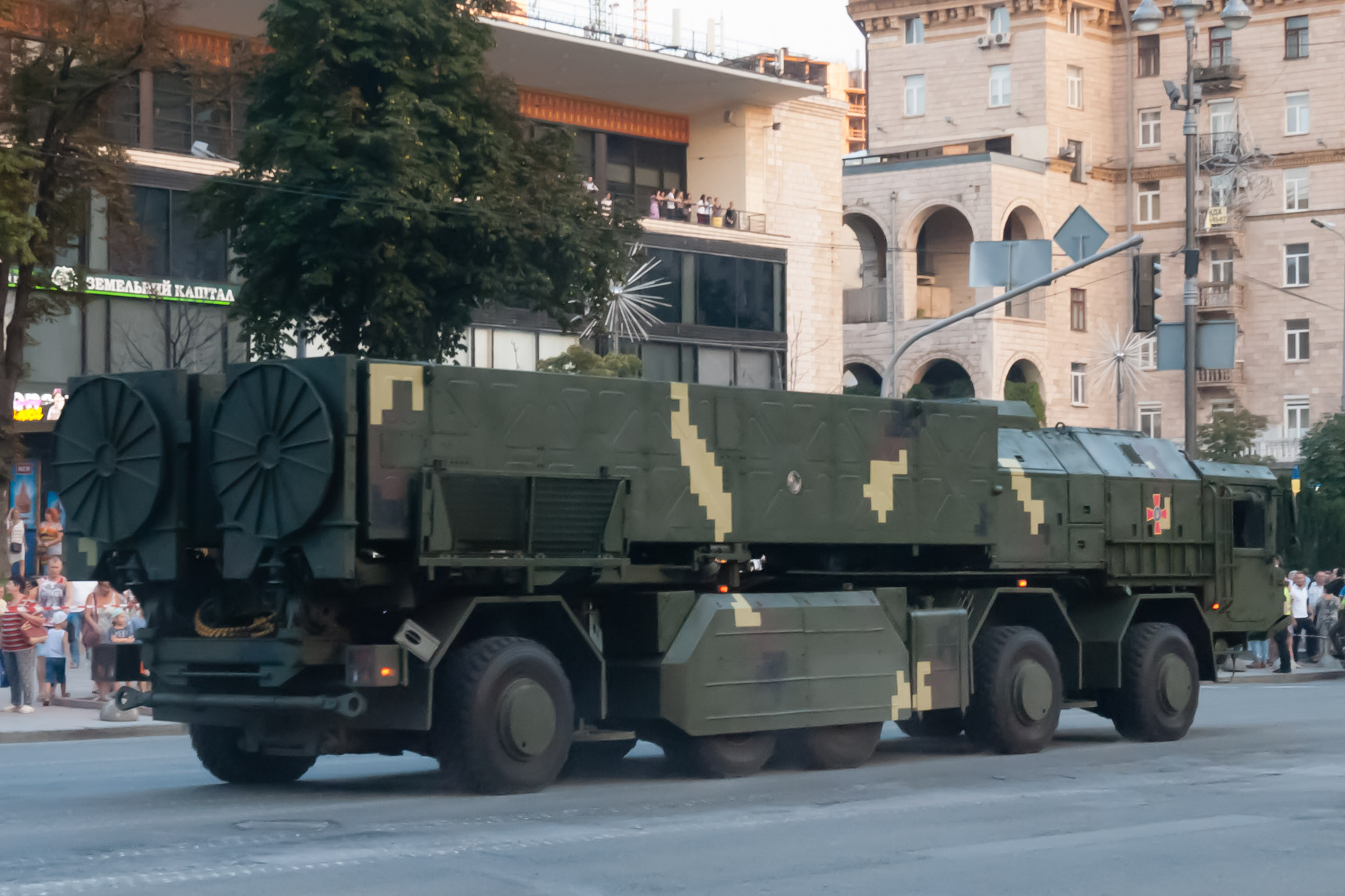

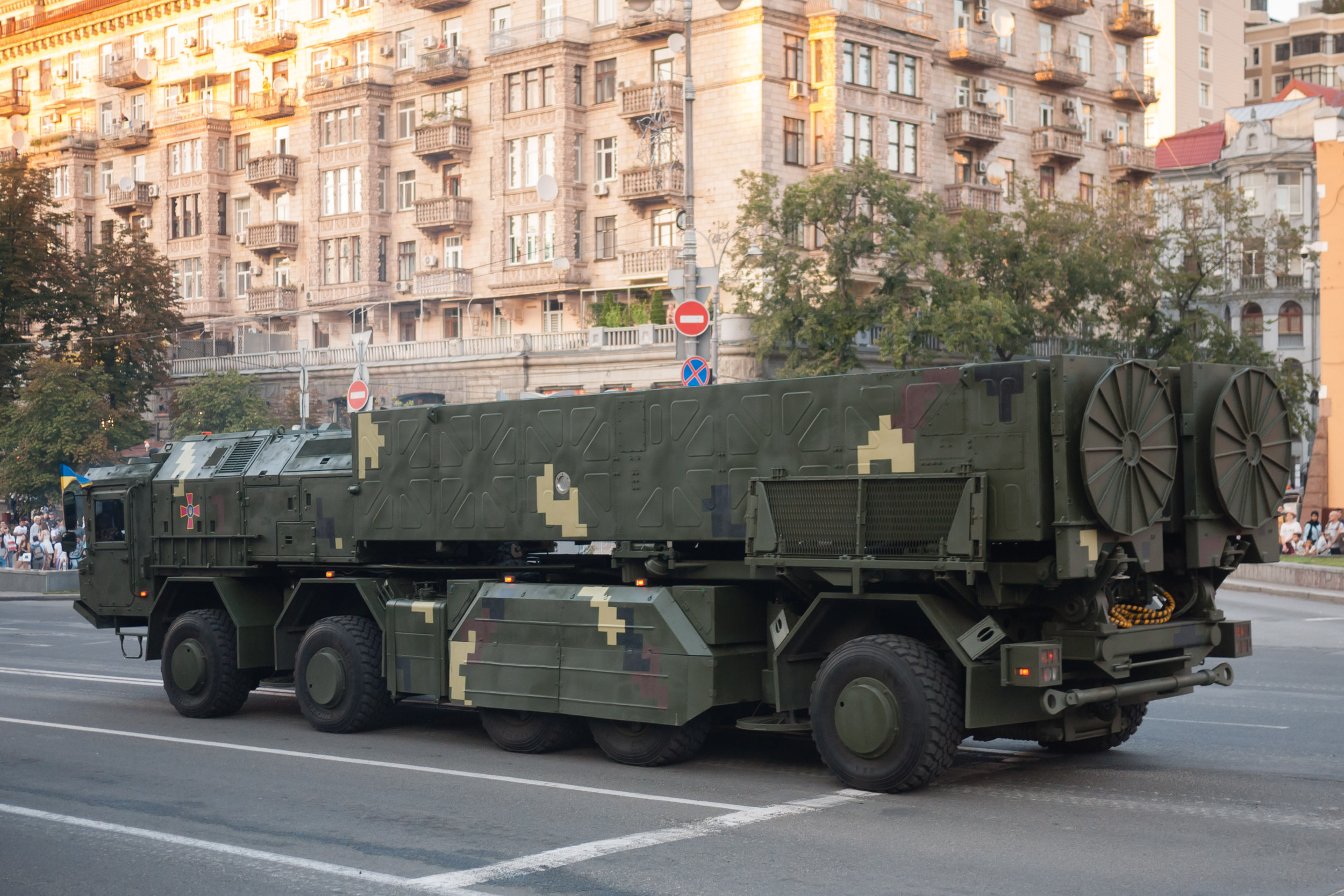

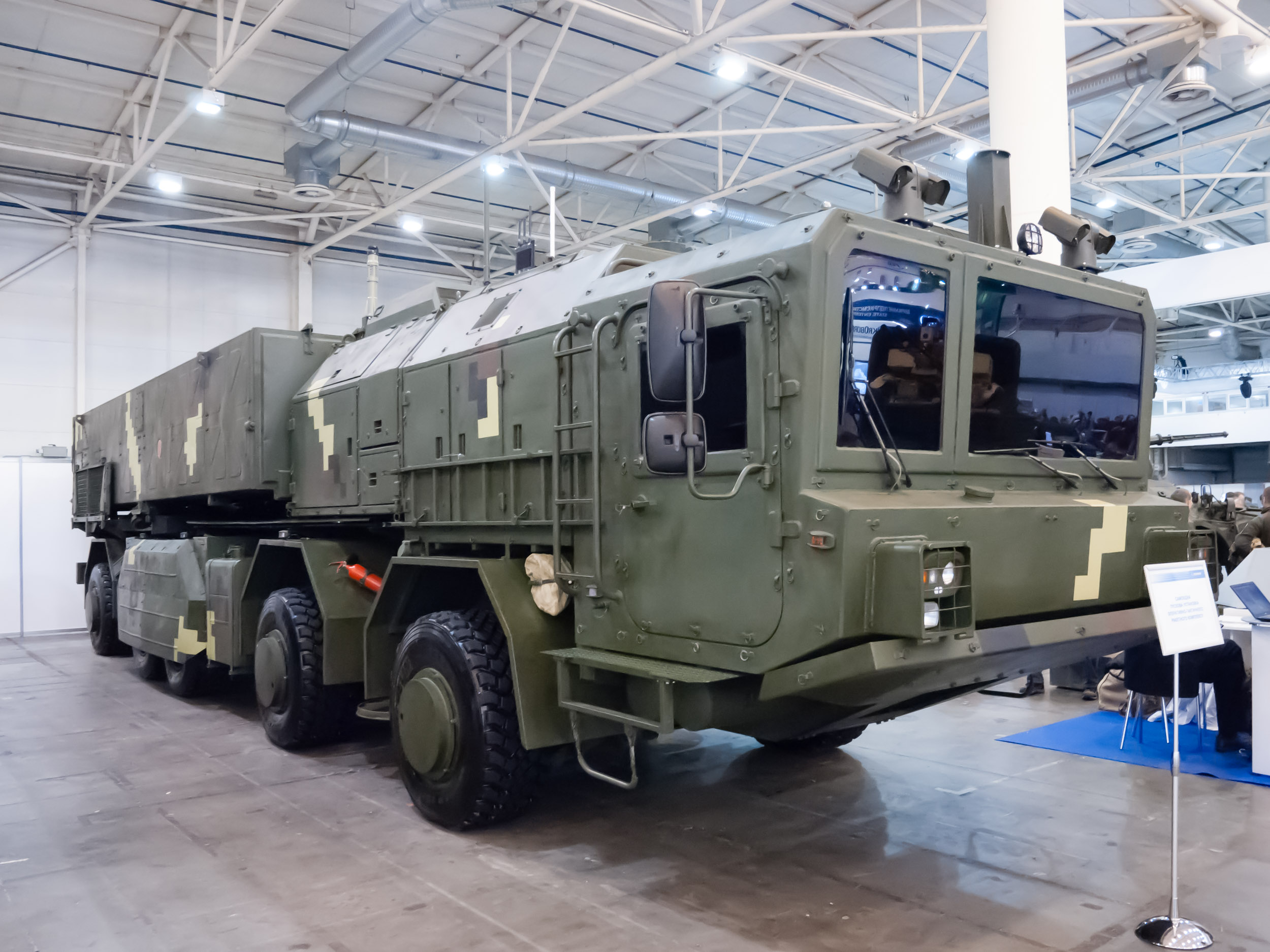

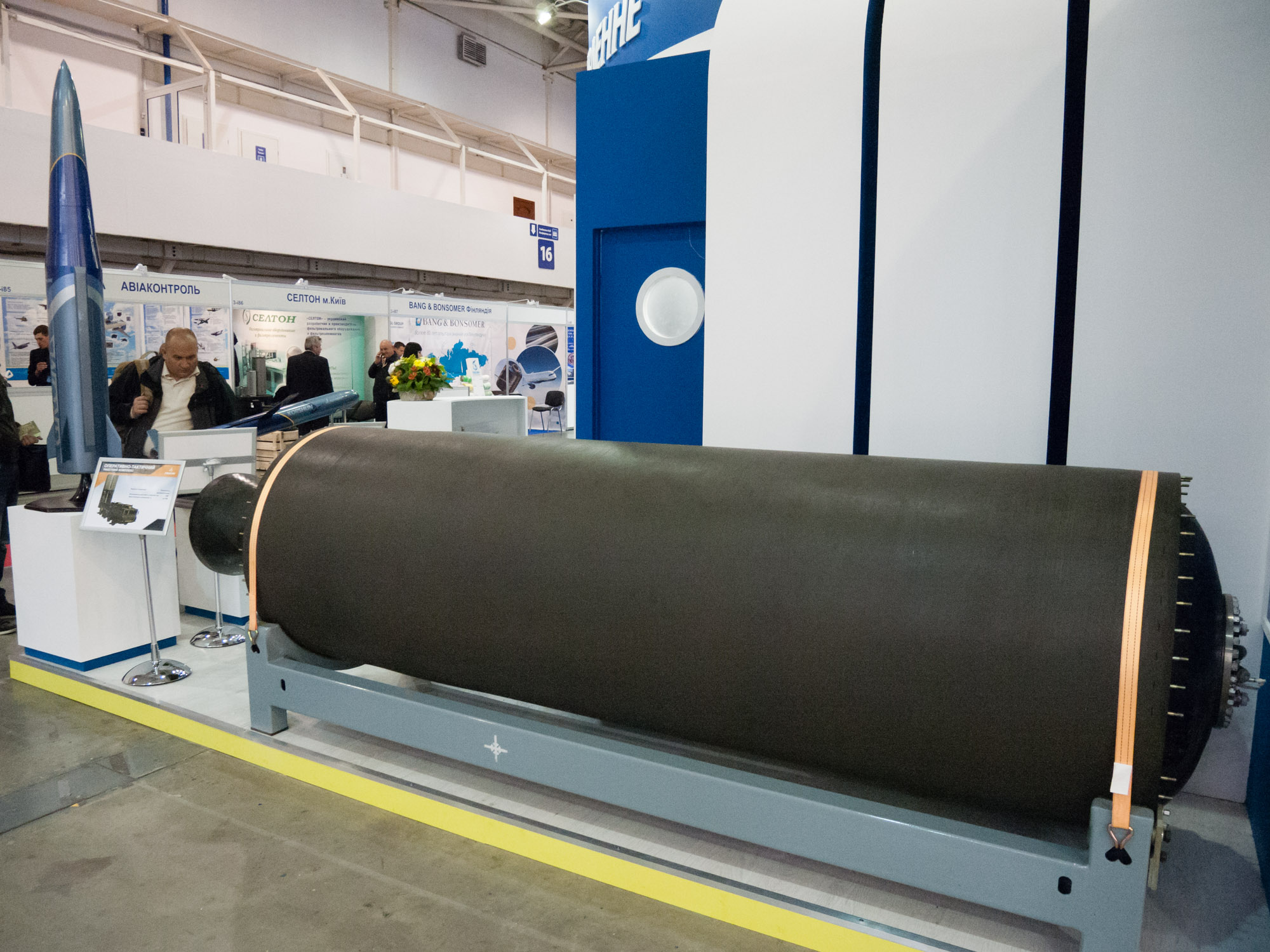
