= Arms and Security =

Annual arms exhibition in Ukraine

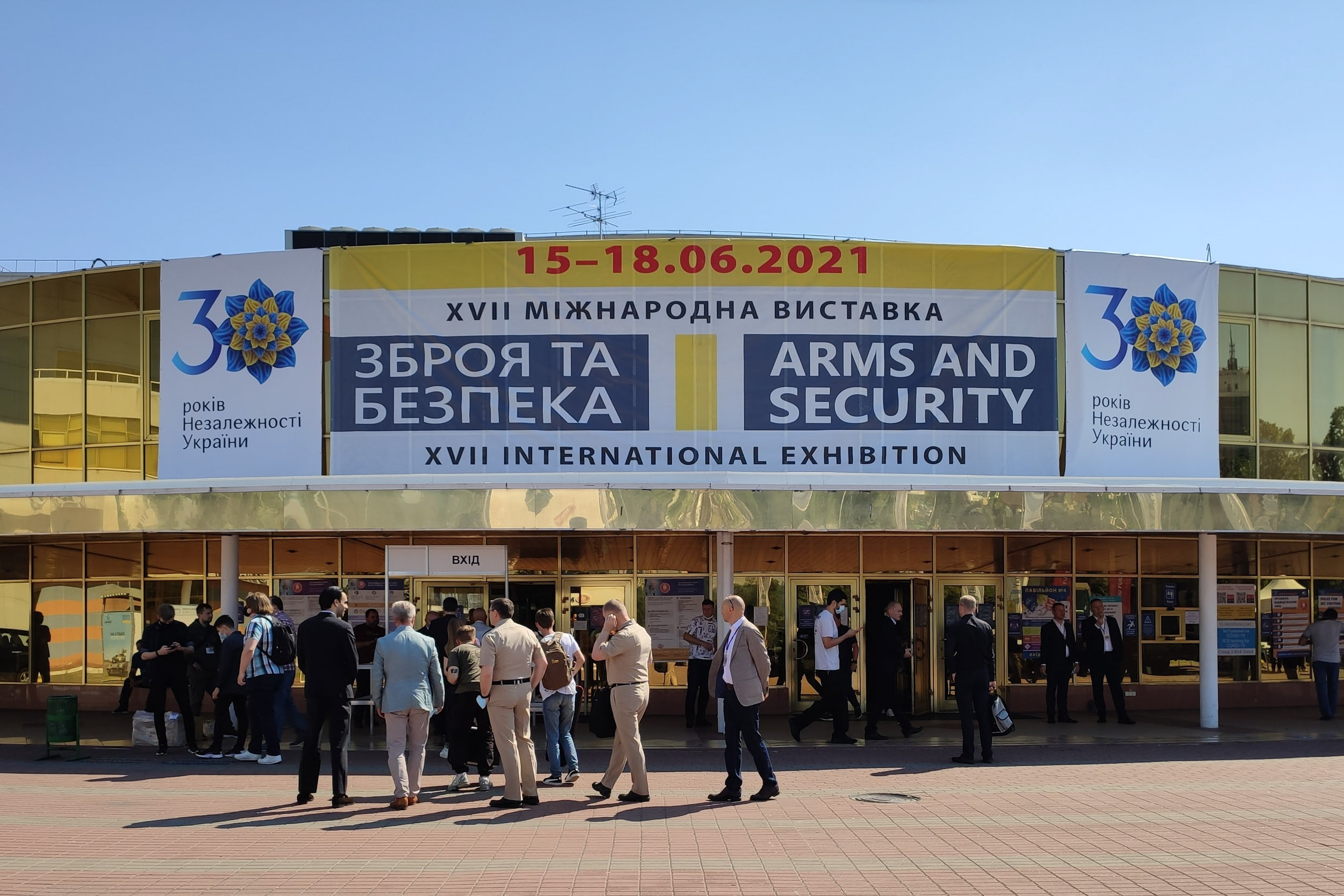
"Arms and Security" 2021

The International specialized exhibition "Arms and Security" (Ukrainian: Міжнародна спеціалізована виставка "Зброя та безпека", "Zbroya ta Bezpeka") is an annual trade show of weapons and military equipment. It takes place in Kyiv, the capital of Ukraine under the patronage of the Cabinet of Ministers of Ukraine The first exhibition was held in September 2004 according to the 2004 decree of the Cabinet of Ministers.

== History ==
In 2018 the exhibitors included 456 Ukrainian participants and 47 foreign ones from 17 countries. Poland, Turkey and the Czech republic exhibited there for the first time.

In 2019 the exhibitors included over 320 Ukrainian participants and 48 foreign ones from 16 countries.

The 2020 exhibition was postponed until June 2021 due to the COVID-19 lockdown.

In 2023 the exhibition was not held due to the Russian invasion of Ukraine and was replaced by a one-day conference, the International Defence Industry Forum, held in Kyiv on September 29, 2023.

== See also ==
- uk:Авіасвіт-XXI, biannual aerospace expo, Ukraine
