= Tanks of the Ukrainian Army =

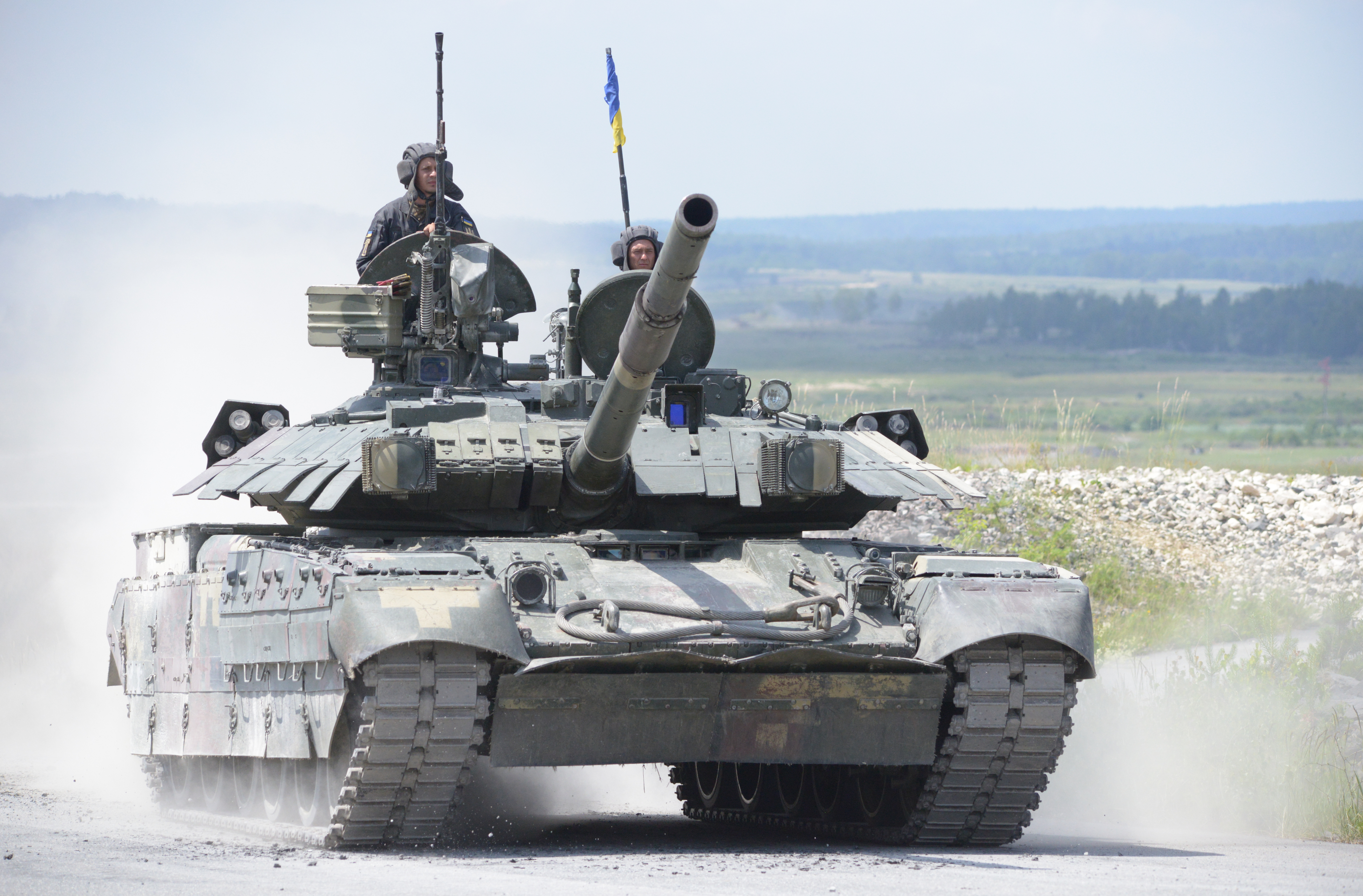
- A T-84U in 2018
- Type: Main battle tank
- Place of origin: Ukraine

Tanks of the Ukrainian Army have been used within the military, with their usage and origin after the Cold War; and the modern era. This includes tanks manufactured in Ukraine, leftover Soviet tanks in the Ukrainian Ground Forces today as well as designs imported from other countries and tanks captured in the Russo-Ukrainian war.

== History ==
Prior to the October Revolution of 1917, independent armed forces in Ukraine existed and had distinct organisation and uniforms in both the First World War and the Second World War. These armed forces, and the independent Ukrainian homeland for which they fought, were eventually incorporated into the neighboring states of Poland, Soviet Union, Hungary, Romania and Czechoslovakia.

=== Collapse of the USSR ===
Upon their establishment in 1991, the Armed Forces of Ukraine was left with its tank forces intact which included approximately 7,000 armored vehicles, 6,500 tanks, and 2,500 tactical nuclear missiles. Following the declaration of Ukrainian independence in 1991, Ukraine inherited the 1st Guards Army, 13th Army, 38th Army, two tank armies (the 6th Guards Tank Army and the 8th Tank Army), and the 32nd Army Corps at Simferopol. The 28th Guards Motor Rifle Division and the 180th Rifle Division were left in Ukraine, having been previously under the 14th Guards Army headquartered at Tiraspol in the Moldovan SSR.

=== Sources of tanks for Ukrainian ground forces ===
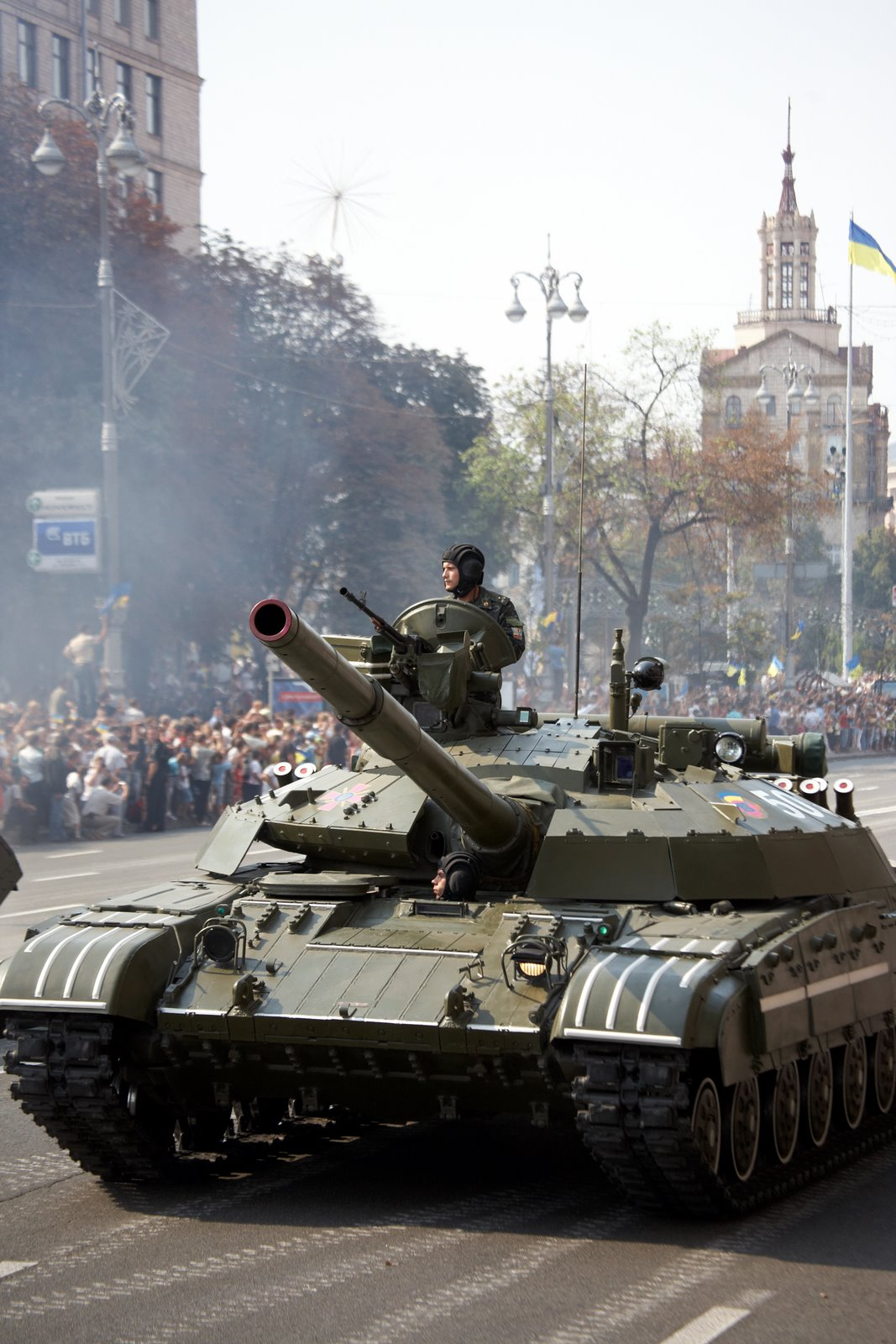
Ukrainian T-64BM Bulat

In the early 1960's, Ukraine developed and built the T-64 tank which is the most numerous tank Ukraine has today and was manufactured in Kharkiv, and designed by the KhMDB. It was a more advanced counterpart to the T-62 with heavier armor and replaced the smaller-diameter guns on the T-54/55/62 line with a new smoothbore 125-millimeter gun. It also introduced a number of advanced features including composite armour, a compact engine and transmission, and its 125-mm gun was equipped with an autoloader to allow the crew to be reduced to three so the tank could be smaller and lighter. In spite of being armed and armoured like a heavy tank, the T-64 weighed only 38 tonnes (42 short tons; 37 long tons). The 700-horsepower diesel engine with a more compact transmission replaced the bigger but less powerful powertrains on older tank types.

These features made the T-64 expensive to build, significantly more so than previous generations of Soviet tanks. This was especially true of the powerpack, which was time-consuming to build and cost twice as much as more conventional designs. Several proposals were made to improve the T-64 with new engines, but chief designer Alexander Alexandrovich Morozov's political power in Moscow kept the design in production in spite of any concerns about price. The result was a fast, heavily armed and thickly armored tank that, on paper, at least matched contemporary Western tanks. Ukraine also had T80 tanks which it captured, and also had the Ukrainian T-80UD diesel engine variant produced in Ukraine. The T-80 variant was sold to many countries, and Ukraine further developed the T-80UD as the T-84.

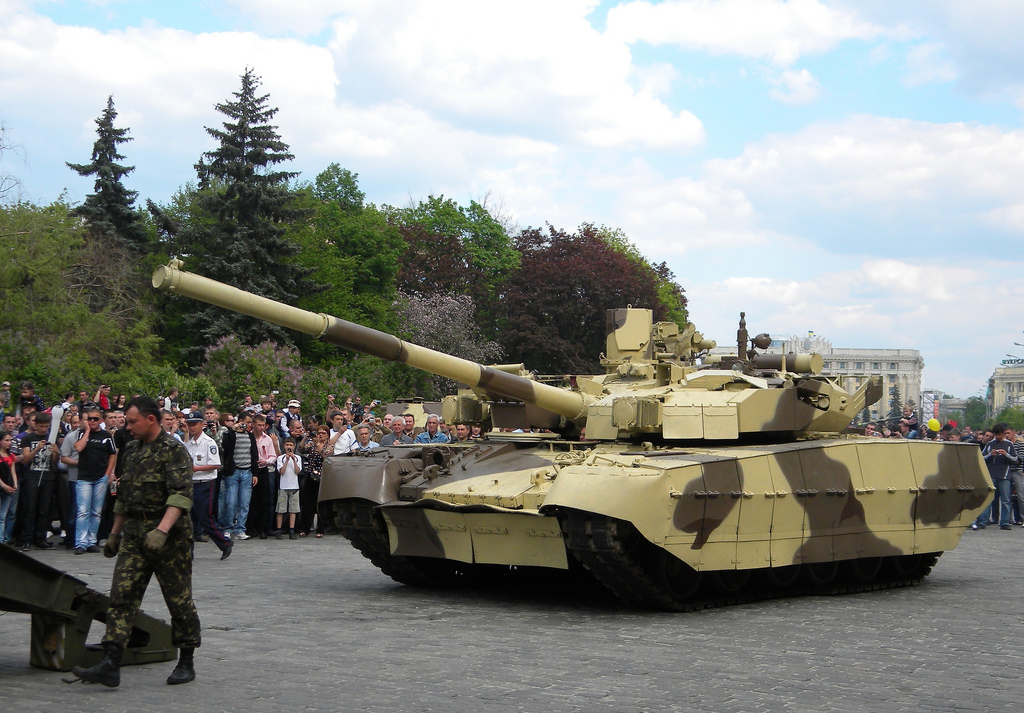
Ukrainian T-84 Oplot

From 1991, the Ukrainian Ground Forces bought its military equipment only from Russia and other CIS states, as well as locally producing some of their own equipment. Until 2014 and the start of the war in Donbas, the defence industry in Ukraine produced equipment mostly for export. The Kharkiv Morozov Machine Building Design Bureau abbreviated KMDB, a Ukrainian state-owned company in Kharkiv, Ukraine, designed armoured vehicles, including the T-80UD and T-84 main battle tanks. The T-84 entered service with the Military of Ukraine in 1999, and the more advanced Oplot version in 2001. The T-84-120 and Yatagan has been developed employing an auto-loaded 120mm tank gun which fires NATO ammunition as well as ATGMs.

Ukraine received a number of PT91 Twardy in 2022, a Polish main battle tank based on T-72M1 that developed sometime between the late 1980s and early 1990s. These PT91 Twardy had a new digital fire-control system, newly developed ERA and an uprated powerplant and had the Soviet-made Volna fire control system replaced by the Czechoslovak-made Kladivo FCS or by the Polish SKO-1 Mérida, which was originally designed for T-55AM "Merida", and is equipped with a Wola 850-horsepower diesel engine. Besides the new FCS, the Radomka passive night vision devices were installed in the driver's compartment, as was the Liswarta night sight, Obra laser illumination warning system, Tellur anti-laser smoke grenade launchers, solid or modular metal side skirts and the Polish-developed Erawa-1 or Erawa-2 explosive reactive armour was also fitted on the PT91 Twardy. Poland is said to have sent Ukraine some 232 T-72 tanks in its fight against the Russian invasion.

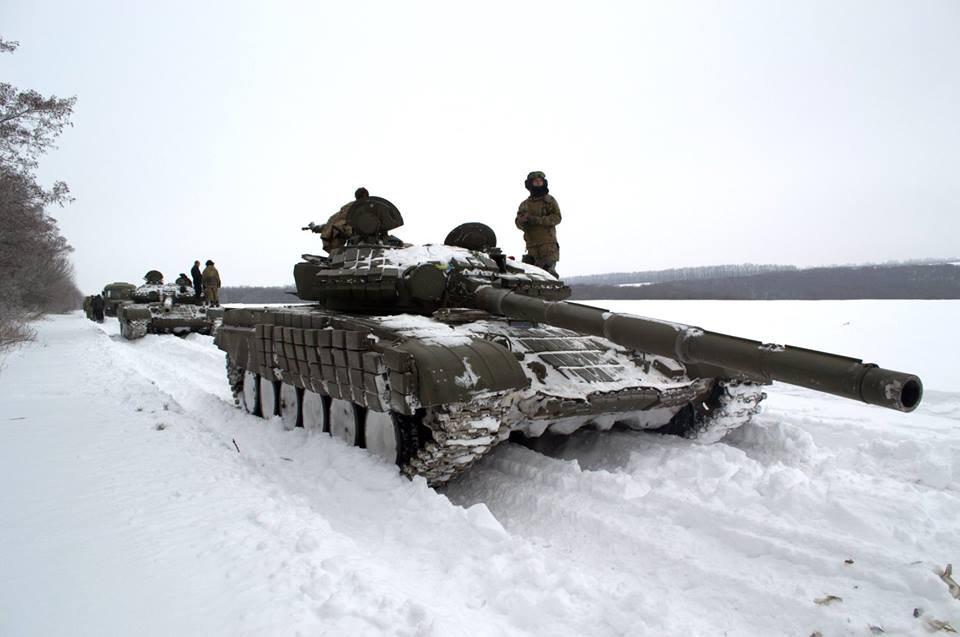
Ukrainian T-72 during training, 2018.

On 20 January 2023, the Netherlands offered Leopard 2 tanks. The offers are conditional on mutual agreement by multiple nations; Germany will not block the export of Leopard 2s (by Poland, Finland, Denmark, to Ukraine. Poland has requested approval to export Leopard 2s to Ukraine. On 25 January 2023, the US agreed to send tanks to Ukraine under the auspices of the Ukraine Security Assistance Initiative (USAI) in a $400 million package; 31 M1 Abrams tanks (an entire Ukraine tank battalion), and 8 M88 Recovery Vehicles (for rescuing mired tanks) will not arrive in Ukraine for months. (Note: The US is attempting to get Abrams tanks to Ukraine earlier, perhaps by August 2023.) Germany has also agreed to send over a dozen Leopard 2s to Ukraine, and will support the donation with ammunition and training in Germany. Germany has agreed to approve the reexport of Leopard 2s from other nations to Ukraine. The goal is to send 80 Leopard 2s to Ukraine. By 25 January 2023, the list of nations willing to send tanks to Ukraine had grown (UK—14 Challenger 2s, US—31 Abrams M1A2, Canada—8 Leopard 2s, Germany— 112 Leopard 1s (eventually 2 battalions (some 88 tanks) plus 14 2A4s immediately), Poland—14 Leopard 2A4s, Finland—14 Leopard 2 A4/A6s, Denmark—6 Leopard 2A5/A7s, Netherlands—18 Leopard 2A4s, Norway—8 Leopard 2A4s, Portugal—4 Leopard 2A4s, and Spain— 20-53 Leopard 2A4s (20 are in good condition, the remainder need repair) respectively). On 23 February, Finland announced its contribution will include 3 pieces of Leopard 2 mine clearing tanks built in Leopard 2A4 platform. A day later, on 24 February 2023, Sweden’s Minister of Defence Pål Jonson announced the donation of 10 Stridsvagn 122 based on the Leopard 2A5 tanks to Ukraine, along with CV90 infantry fighting vehicles.

On 7 February 2023, the European community determined that industrial manufacturers hold 178 Leopard 1 tanks which could be refurbished and provided to Ukraine, with 20-25 Leopard 1A5 tanks available in the upcoming months of 2023. The remainder could be delivered in 2024, assuming that Germany, the Netherlands, and Denmark fund them.

In total, as of January 2023, Western countries have promised to deliver more than 300 tanks to Ukraine, including Leopard 2, Challenger 2, and M1 Abrams tanks.

=== Russian-Ukrainian War ===
==== War in Donbas (2014–2022) ====
In the early months of the war in Donbas that erupted in 2014, the Armed Forces were widely criticised for their poor equipment and inept leadership, forcing Internal Affairs Ministry forces like the National Guard and the territorial defence battalions to take on the brunt of the fighting in the first months of the war.

By February 2018, the Ukrainian armed forces were larger and better equipped, numbering 200,000 active-service military personnel. Most of the volunteer soldiers of the territorial defence battalions were integrated into the official Ukrainian army. Ukraine used mainly Russian or Warsaw Pact designed tanks prior to the invasion, with over 800-900 tanks in service at the beginning of the war. There were some models it had made in its factories, but because of the need on the economic side, some were sold for export. It had mainly T-84BM/U Oplot, T-80BV, a T-64BM with an estimated 800 active T-64 tanks, and a large number of T72 variants, but 700 were sold to third world countries. The most notable Ukrainian tank was the T-64 main battle tank which was designed and produced in Ukraine and was modernized as the T-64BM Bulat and considered technologically superior to the Russian counterparts.

==== Full-scale Russian invasion ====
On 24 February 2022, Russia began a full-scale invasion of Ukraine. The invasion began on 24 February 2022, launched out of Belarus to target Kyiv, and from the northeast against the city of Kharkiv. The southeastern front was conducted as two separate spearheads, from Crimea and the southeast against Luhansk and Donetsk. The Ukrainian tank battle at Chernihiv by the 1st Tank Brigade’s T-64B and T-64BM tanks against the Russian 41st Combined Arms Army with its 20,000 troops and hundreds of T-72 tanks in defense of the city and holding out, was remarkable. On 25 March 2022, the Ukrainians began a counter-offensive in the north which retook several towns to the east and west of Kyiv, including Makariv. Russian troops in the Bucha area retreated north at the end of March. Ukrainian forces entered the city on 1 April. The Ground Forces have been participants of most of the land combat actions of the current war.

The counter offensive also spread to Kharkiv, and on 13 May 2022, BBC reported that Russian troops in Kharkiv were being retracted and redeployed to other fronts in Ukraine following the advances of Ukrainian troops into surrounding cities and Kharkiv itself, which included the destruction of strategic pontoon bridges built by Russian troops to cross over the Seversky Donets river and previously used for rapid tank deployment in the region.

Ukraine in September 2022 did a fall offensive that retook more than 3,088 sq miles from Russian control with armored forces supported by some of the vehicles from Western countries. It retook the major cities of Izyum and Kupiansk, which were key supply centers for the Russian forces. Ukrainian also formed large armor forces to attack around the Kherson in the south of the country, but the Russians retreated across the river before the main attack. The influx of Western material and supplies to the branch before and during the conflict as well as mobilization efforts have resulted in a massive expansion of the Ukrainian forces with more than 500 T-72s from Poland, the Czech Republic and other countries, in addition to ongoing force modernization. The Ukrainian tank forces were an important factor in almost every major sector and its estimated Russian losses have been almost 40 percent of their prewar number of tanks, and had begun to bring in older T-62 tanks out of storage. However, the Ukrainian army have lost half of their most common tank, over 50 percent of their 800 prewar active T-64 tanks, which can't be replaced in contrast to more current t-72's and T-80's.

On 1 August 2022, Russian forces launched massive ground attacks on the city of Bakhmut. Both the Russian Ministry of Defense and pro-Russian Telegram pages claimed that the battle of Bakhmut had begun. The following day, Ukraine reported that Russian forces had increased airstrikes and shelling of Bakhmut, beginning a ground attack on the southeastern part of the city. On 4 August, Wagner Group mercenaries managed to break through Ukrainian defenses and reach the eastern outskirts of Bakhmut. However, German-made Leopard 2 tanks were spotted near Bakhmut near the frontline, and it seemed the battle had become a stalemate. They had started to come into Ukraine on February 24, 2023, when Poland handed over the first four out of 14 Leopard 2A4 main battle tanks to the 4th Tank Brigade. Ukraine has also received the British Challenger 2's that were promised along with Marder infantry fighting vehicles from Germany, and US Cougar armored trucks and Stryker armored personnel carriers.

Some western tanks have been reported as lost in attacks on Russian positions so they are engaged in the fight to recover the territory of Ukraine. On 24 September 2023 during the Zaporizhzhia counteroffensive, two Stridsvagn 122 tanks were lost in combat.

As of 23 June 2025, according Oryx, Ukrainian forces have lost 1,203 tanks of which 882 were destroyed, 80 were damaged, 95 were abandoned, and 146 tanks were captured by Russian forces in Ukraine.

== List of tanks in Ukrainian Army ==
=== Main battle tanks ===
Model	Image	Origin	Variant	Number	Details
T-55		Soviet Union; Slovenia	M-55S	~28	Slovenia delivered 28 in October 2022 after a swap deal was agreed with Germany the previous month.
T-62		Soviet Union; Russia	T-62 obr. 1967; T-62M; T-62MV	1 (T-62 obr. 1967); 33 (T-62M); 8 (T-62MV)	All T-62s in Ukraine's current inventory have been captured during the 2022 Russian invasion of Ukraine.
T-64		Soviet Union; Ukraine	T-64A T-64B T-64BV; T-64BV Zr. 2017; T-64BVK T-64B1M T-64BM 'Bulat'; T-64BM2 'Bulat'	578; 410; 210; 100	There were 578 T-64As and T-64Bs in storage in 2021 before the war, and they would need to be overhauled before returning to service. As of 18 February 2025, 366 T-64BV, 4 T-64B,2 T-64A,126 T-64BV Zr, 1 T-64BVK, 10 T-64B1M, 22 T-64BM 'Bulat', 4 T-64BM2 'Bulat' and 2 Unknown T-64 tanks have been visually confirmed as destroyed or damaged.
T-72		Soviet Union; Czechoslovakia; Czech Republic; Poland; North Macedonia; Morocco; Slovenia; Romania; Bulgaria; Russia; Ukraine	T-72AMT/UA1; T-72B1; T-72AV; T-72M1; T-72M1R; T-72B (refurbished); Captured: T-72A; T-72AV; T-72B; T-72B Obr. 1989; T-72BA; T-72B3; T-72B3 Obr. 2016; T-72 Avenger	130; 230+90; ~300+ 117 (T-72 Avenger)	There were 500 T-72/T-72 in storage in 2021 with no plans yet for repairs. As of 3 January 2022, 308 T-72 tanks have been visually confirmed captured, which is the biggest number among all Russian main battle tank types. Various countries donated T-72s due to the 2022 invasion of Ukraine. Poland delivered more than 260 tanks mainly of T-72M1, T-72M1R and PT-91 Twardy tanks. Czech Republic provided 218+ tanks (62 T-72M1 of that supported by German ring deal; 90 of that being T-72 Avenger in cooperation with the US and the Netherlands, portion of which were modernized from T-72B provided by Morocco, further 15 T-72 Avenger in cooperation with Denmark and Netherlands). North Macedonia donated at least eight T-72 tanks. Additionally, one T-72 Avenger was crowdfunded by citizens of the Czech Republic in October 2022.
T-80		Soviet Union; Russia; Ukraine	T-80BV; T-80UD; T-80U; Captured: T-80BV; T-80BVM; T-80U; T-80UE1; T-80UK	~130; 156+	According to an advisor to then President Petro Poroshenko in 2015, around 100 T-80BV tanks were to be restored to service. As of 13 February 2025, 74 T-80 BV and 1 T-80 UD tanks have been visually confirmed as destroyed or damaged.
T-84		Ukraine	T-84U	5	Ten T-84Us acquired before 2014, with only five being in active service in 2021 with the 14th Mechanized Brigade.
T-90		Russia	T-90A T-90M T-90S	12 (T-90A) 2 (T-90M)	All T-90 in Ukraine's current inventory have been captured from Russia during the 2022 Russian invasion of Ukraine.
PT-91 Twardy		Poland		>60	It was disclosed that Poland is supplying PT-91 tanks in July 2022. On 24 February 2023, Poland's prime minister announced an additional 60 PT-91 tanks would be sent to Ukraine "in the coming days".
Leopard 1		Germany; Norway; Denmark; Netherlands	1A5; Bergepanzer 2 ARV 17; Pionierpanzer 2 Dachs AEV; Biber AVLB; Wisent 1 MC "NM189 Ingeniørpanservogn"	>270	Germany pledged 88 tanks. On March 21, 2023, Norway sent 2 "NM189 Ingeniørpanservogn"(variant of Leopard 1A5) and 2 Bergepanzer 2 ARV tanks to Ukraine. On March 11, 2023, the Danish Ministry of Defense announced the first batch of 80 Leopard 1A5 tanks would be delivered "by spring".
Leopard 2		Germany; Poland; Sweden; Finland; Portugal; Spain; Norway; Canada; Netherlands; Denmark	2A4; 2A6; BPz3 Büffel ARV; 2R Minebreacher "Raivauspanssarivaunu Leopard 2R"; Stridsvagn 122	>167	On 11 January 2023, during the Lublin Triangle meeting of the Ukrainian, Polish and Lithuanian presidents, it was announced that Poland will deliver a company of 14 Leopard 2 tanks. On 9 March 2023, 14 Polish Leopard 2A4 were delivered On 20 March 2023, Norway announced eight Leopard 2A4 were delivered. On 27 March 2023, Portugal announced three Leopard 2A4 were delivered. On 28 March 2023, 18 German Leopard 2A6 were delivered On 26 January 2023, Canadian Prime Minister Justin Trudeau announced that Canada would give Ukraine four combat ready Leopard 2 tanks. Then on 24 February, the one-year anniversary of the Russian invasion of Ukraine, it was announced that Canada would send four more Leopard 2 tanks to Ukraine, totaling eight Leopard 2 tanks. On 23 February 23, the Swedish government pledged to send 10 Leopard 2A5/Strv122 to Ukraine, Finland announced it would send three modified mine-clearing Leopard 2 tanks to Ukraine. On 23 March, three more mine-clearing Leopard 2s were pledged, bringing the total to six. On 15 March 2023, the Spanish government pledged a total of ten Leopard 2A4 tanks, with the first six expected to arrive in Ukraine in the second half of April. On 15 July 2024, Spain announced a second donation batch of 10 Leopard 2A4 tanks to Ukraine. On 17 October 2024, Germany announced a donation of 18 Leopard 2A6. On 20 November, Spain announced the refurbishment of nine Leopard 2A4 tanks for Ukraine.
Challenger 2		United Kingdom		14	On 11 January 2023, the United Kingdom confirmed plans to send modern heavy tanks to Ukraine. On 28 March, 14 Challenger tanks were delivered to Ukraine.
M1 Abrams		United States; Australia	M1A1 SA M1A1 AIM	80	In January 2023, the United States stated they will send 31 M1 Abrams tanks to Ukraine. They have arrived as of September 2023. As of 16 February 2025, 19 M1A1 Abrams tanks have been visually confirmed as destroyed or damaged. On 16 October 2024, Australia announced the donation of 49 Abrams M1A1 AIM tanks to Ukraine. As of July 2025, the majority of the tanks had been delivered to Ukraine.

== See also ==
- Armed Forces of Ukraine
- List of armoured fighting vehicles of Ukraine
- List of equipment of the Armed Forces of Ukraine
- List of equipment of the National Guard of Ukraine

== Sources ==
- Zaloga, Steven J.; Markov, David (2000). Russia's T-80U Main Battle Tank. Hong Kong: Concord Publications. ISBN 962-361-656-2.
- Zaloga, Steven J. (17 February 2009). T-80 Standard Tank: The Soviet Army's Last Armored Champion. Osprey Publishing, New Vanguard. ISBN 978-1-84603-244-8.
- Ukraine pulls US-provided Abrams tanks from the front lines over Russian drone threats | AP News
