= List of armoured fighting vehicles of Ukraine =

This is a list of armoured fighting vehicles originating in Ukraine, including the Ukrainian Soviet Socialist Republic.

Ukraine's main tank factory is the Malyshev Factory, established 1895 as the Kharkiv Locomotive Factory, KhPZ. It started building tractors in 1923, and had the Morozov Design Bureau (KMDB) for tanks added in 1928. It was evacuated to Nizhny Tagil, Russia, from 1941 to 1944/45 during the Second World War.

Important tank refurbishing and repair plants include the Kyiv Armoured Plant (KBTZ, established 1935), Zhytomyr Armoured Plant (ZhBTZ, 1943), Lviv Armoured Plant (LBTZ, 1944), Mykolaiv Armored Plant (MBTZ, 1948), Kharkiv Armoured Plant (KhBTZ, 1996). The Mikrotek Basic Centre for Critical Technologies in Kyiv develops reactive and active armour systems since 1994.

Figures are dates and numbers built in Ukraine, except where noted. As of 22 April the US Defense Department considers that, because of the large number of tanks lost by and captured from Russian forces, as well as vehicles delivered to Ukraine, the Armed Forces of Ukraine operate more tanks than Russia.

== Tanks ==
- T-12 medium tank (1930 prototype, 30 built at the Malyshev Factory, see T-24)
- T-24 medium tank (1931, 25 built by Malyshev)
- BT fast tanks (1932–45, about 8,050 built by Malyshev)
  - BT-1
  - BT-2 (1932)
  - BT-3
  - BT-4
  - BT-5
  - BT-7 (1935)
    - BT-7M (1938, also called BT-8)
  - A-20 (1941 prototype)
  - A-32 (1941 prototype)
- T-35 heavy tank (designed by OKMO in Leningrad, 1930–32, 61 built by Malyshev)
- T-34 medium tank (1940–45 in the Soviet Union, to 1958 in Poland and Czechoslovakia, about 84,070 built in total)
  - T-34
  - T-34-85
- T-44 medium tank (1944–47, 1,823 built by Malyshev)
  - T-44A (production model)
  - T-44S with stabilizer (1966)
  - T-44M (1961)
    - T-44MK command tank (1963)
    - T-44MS (1966)
  - T-44-122 (1944 prototype)
  - SU-122-44 self-propelled gun (1944 prototype)
  - T-44-100 (1945 prototype)
- T-54 medium tank (1946–59 by Malyshev, and until 1983 other factories in the Soviet Union, Poland, and Czechoslovakia)
  - T-54-1 (1947–48)
  - T-54A and T-54B development was moved to Russia
- (T-55, 1958–)
  - T-55AGM
  - T-55MV
  - T-55-64 prototype
- T-64 main battle tank (1963–87, about 13,000 built by Malyshev)
  - T-64 (1961, about 600 built)
  - T-64A
    - T-64AK (1972, command version)
    - T-64R (1980s, upgrade of original T-64)
  - T-64B (1976)
    - T-64BV (1985)
      - T-64BV model 2017 (upgrade)
    - T-64BK
    - T-64B1
      - T-64B1K
      - T-64B1M (1970s upgrade)
    - T-64BM (1985 upgrade)
  - KhTV-64 driver trainer
  - T-64BM2
  - T-64U (1990s)
  - T-64BM Bulat (2005)
  - T-64E (2010 prototype, built by KhBTZ)
  - T-Rex concept tank with unmanned turret
- (T-72, designed and built in Russia)
  - T-72AM Banan modernization (1992)
  - T-72AG modernization (1997)
  - T-72MP modernization (1997)
  - T-72-120 (1999)
  - T-72UA1 (2011–14, 171 delivered to Ethiopia, about 30 to Ukrainian Forces)
  - T-72E (2011)
  - T-72AMT (2017)
- T-80 main battle tank (1976, turret designed at KMDB, tank at the Leningrad Kirov Plant in Russia)
  - T-80UD Bereza, diesel version of the gas-turbine T-80U (1987–2002 by Malyshev, 430 delivered to Pakistan, 4 to the United States)
    - T-80UDK command tank
  - (T-80BV)
    - T-80BVD (2002 prototype)
    - T-80BV upgraded for Ukrainian airborne and marine units
- T-84 main battle tank main battle tank (or BM Oplot, built by Malyshev)
  - T-84U Oplot (1999, 10 in service)
    - T-84 Oplot-M modernization (2009, in progress)
  - T-84-120 Yatagan (2000 prototype)
  - T-84 Oplot-T export version (2014–18, 49 delivered to Thailand)

== Armoured cars ==
- Dozor-A (2004)
- VEPR (2006, built by KrAZ)
  - VEPR-K Komandyr
  - VEPR-K Sport
  - VEPR-M Myslyvets
  - VEPR-S Spetsialnyi
- Kozak (2009, built by NVO Praktyka)
  - Kozak-1
  - SRM-1 Kozak multirole vehicle
  - Kozak-2 (SBA Kozak-001, in service 2016)
    - Kozak-2M.2 (in service 2020)
  - Kozak-4
  - Kozak-5 special ops vehicle (2016)
- KRAZ-ASV Panther Mine-Resistant Ambush Protected (2013, built by KrAZ)
  - KRAZ-ASV Panther 4×4
  - KRAZ-ASV Panther 6×6
- BRDM-2DI Khazar reconnaissance vehicle (2014, built by Mykolaiv BTZd)
- KrAZ Cobra (2014, built by KrAZ)
- KrAZ Cougar (2014, built by KrAZ under licence from STREIT Group)
- KrAZ Fortress on Wheels (2014 designed by NVO Praktika)
- KrAZ-MPV Shrek One 4×4 MRAP (2014, built by KrAZ based on KrAZ-5233 truck)
  - KrAZ Shrek One TC
  - KrAZ Shrek One Ambulance
  - KrAZ Shrek One RCV
- KrAZ Spartan (2014, built by KrAZ under licence from STREIT Group)
- KrAZ Raptor 6×6 (2014)
- KrAZ Raptor 4×4 (2015)
- KrAZ Hurricane 8×8 MRAP (2015, built by KrAZ)
- KrAZ Fiona 6×6 MRAP (2015, built by KrAZ)
- KrAZ-Forpost MRAP, or KrAZ APC (2015, built by KrAZ)
- Godzilla MRAP (2015, built by Reform)
- Makhno reconnaissance vehicle (2015 prototype, built by Kuznia na Rybalskomu)
- Ovid armoured car (2015 prototype, built by ZhBTZ)
- SBA Varta (2015, built by Ukrainian Armor)
- Tryton armoured car (2015, built by Kuznia na Rybalskomu)
- KrAZ Hulk (2016)
- Varta-Redut MRAP (2016, built by Ukrainian Armor)
- Bars-6 (2016, designed by NVO Praktika and Bohdan Motors)
- Bars-8 (2016, designed by NVO Praktika and Bohdan Motors)
  - Bars-8AR artillery reconnaissance vehicle
  - Bars-8MMK (UKR-MMC) 120-mm mortar carrier (2019)
- Dozor-B (2016, built by Malyshev, Kyiv BTZ, and Lviv BTZ)
- BRM Manhust, or BRDM-NIK, modernized BRDM-2 (2017, built by Mykolaiv BTZ)
- SBA Novator (2019, built by Ukrainian Armor)
- KrAZ Convoy
- Inguar-3 MRAP

== Infantry carriers ==
- MT-LBu (1966, designed by Kharkiv Tractor Plant, KhTZ)
  - 1AR1 Polozhennia-2 acoustic counterbattery system (built by LORTA state plant)
  - I-52 Kremin minelayer (2013, built by Kriukiv VBZ, KVBZ)
- MT-LB (1966, designed by KhTZ, over 9,000 built there and elsewhere in the Soviet Union, Bulgaria, Poland, and Russia)
  - MT-LBR6 with ZTM-1 weapons module
  - MT-LBR7 with Shturm weapons module
  - MT-LBMSh with Shkval weapons module (2006, Malyshev)
  - MT-LB-T-23-2 antiaircraft gun (2015, NPK Tekhimpeks)
  - BMP-1LB medium IFV
- BTR-94 (1999–2000, 50 built by Malyshev)
- BVMP-84 heavy IFV, or BMT-84, (2000 prototype, built by Malyshev)
- BTR-3 (2000, built by Malyshev)
  - BTR-3U Myslyvets, redesign of the BTR-94
  - BTR-3E
    - BTR-3E1
    - BTR-3E ARV
    - BTR-3E CPWS-30 fire-support
    - BTR-3M1 self-propelled 82-mm mortar
    - BTR-3M2 self-propelled 120-mm mortar
  - BTR-3K command
  - BTR-3S ambulance
  - BTR-3BR ARV
  - BTR-3DA (2017)
  - BTR-3KSH command and control vehicle
- BMP-1U modernization (2001)
  - BMP-1U (exported to Georgia, Chad, Turkmenistan)
  - BMP-1U Shkval
  - BMP-1M
  - BMP-1UM
  - BMP-1UMD
- BMPV-64 heavy IFV (2005 prototype, built by KhBTZ)
  - BMPT-64
  - YMBP-64
  - UMR-64
  - BTRV-64
  - BMPT-K-64 heavy IFV, 8×8 based on T-64 drivetrain
- BTRV-64 heavy APC (2005 prototype)
- BTR-4 Butsefal (2009, built by Malyshev)
  - BRM-4K reconnaissance
  - BTR-4K command
  - BTR-4KSh command and staff
  - BTR-4E1
  - BTR-4MV1
  - MOP-4K fire support
  - BREM-4 ARV
    - BREM-4K (for Iraq)
    - BREM-4RM
  - BSEM-4K recovery and medical
  - BMM-4A first aid and evacuation
  - BMM-4B battalion-level medical treatment
  - BMM-4C field hospital
- BTR-7 (2011, built by MBTkZ) based on BTR-70 and BTR-80
  - BTR-70Di (BTR-7 Zakhysnyk) APC
  - BTR-70Di-02 Svitiaz command vehicle (2012)
  - BTR-70DiP police vehicle
  - BTR-70SM (BMM Kovcheh) medical vehicle
  - BREM-7K (BREM-2000K) ARV
- Varan armoured personnel carrier (2015, designed by NPK Teximpeks)
- BTR Otaman (2016, designed by NPO Praktika)
  - Otaman 6×6
  - Otaman 3
- Kevlar-E IFV (2017 concept by Ukrinmash)
- Tur IFV (2017 concept by TOV Kort)
- BMT-72 heavy IFV
- Berserk heavy IFV concept

== Combat engineering vehicles ==
- BAT-2

== Support vehicles ==
- PZM-3 trencher (2017, built by Kriukiv VZ)
- BTS-4A ARV (BTS-4-44M) conversion of T-44 (1965)
- BREM-2 ARV based on BMP-1 (1986, designed in the Soviet defence ministry's Kyiv Design-Technology Centre)b
- BREM-64 ARV based on T-64
- BTS-5B ARV, Ukrainian version of BREM-1, based on T-72A tank
- BREM-84 Atlet ARV (2008)
  - BREM-T ARV (2018, 2 delivered to Thailand)
- BREM Lev, based on T-72 (2018, built by LBTZ)
- MTU-80 bridgelayer
- BMU-84 bridgelayer

== Self-propelled artillery ==
- (BM-21 Grad)
  - Bastion-01 (2008, built by ShRZ, Shepetivka)
  - Bastion-02 (built by ShRZ)
  - BM-21K (2009)
  - Bastion-03 (2010 prototype, built by ShRZ)
  - BM-21U Grad-M (2012, built by KrAZ)
  - Verba MRL (2015, built by ShRZ)
  - BM-21UM Berest (2018, built by ShRZ)
- BMPT Azovets (2015)
- BMPT Strazh (2017)
- 2S22 Bohdana 155-mm self-propelled howitzer (2018, built by KhTZ)
- Vilkha 300-mm MRL (2019, built by DAKhK Artem)

== Unmanned AFVs ==
- Fantom multirole wheeled UAVb

== See also ==
- List of tanks of the Soviet Union
- List of Soviet tank factories
