= List of Polish armoured fighting vehicles =

This is a list of armoured fighting vehicles used by Polish forces.

== Armoured cars ==
- Peugeot 1918 armoured car (Poland bought 20 Peugeot 1918 armoured cars from France in 1920)
- Ford FT-B armoured car (Ford Model T with added armour and a turret with one machine gun, 17 built)
- Austin-Putilov armoured car (Poland captured during the Russian Civil War and Polish-Soviet War more than 20 Austin-Putilov armoured cars in different variants. Some were subsequently employed by the Polish. Five remained in service after the war, some until the 1930s.)
- wz. 28 armoured car
- Samochód pancerny wz. 34 (based on wz. 28 armoured car, around 80 built)
- wz. 29 "Ursus" armoured car (11 built)
- AB-41 armoured car (Used for training by the Carpathian Lancers in Egypt from June 1942.)
- Kubuś (made by participants in the Warsaw Uprising. Kubuś, translated as "Jackie", a nickname of "Jacob", is currently preserved in the Polish Army Museum in Warsaw. It was built upon a Chevrolet truck chassis, and used during the first days of the Warsaw Uprising in August 1944. It was designed to carry an assault squad and had no fixed weapons. Firing ports for installed for 2 LMGs and rifles or SMGs. It was used during the attack on Warsaw University.)
- BA-20 (Polish units received 4 BA-20 armoured cars (also in railroad version - BA-20ZD), which were joined to 31. and 59.Division of Armoured Trains of 1.Polish Army(1.WP) Polish BA-20 were used since 1944 to January 1945. Polish divisions with BA-20 fought mainly near Warsaw. After January 1945 they were probably given back to the Soviets. Most probably had standard Soviet painting (dark geen/olive drab) with Polish insignias (white eagle).)
- BA-20ZD (Polish units received 4 BA-20 armoured cars (also in railroad version - BA-20ZD), which were joined to 31. and 59.Division of Armoured Trains of 1.Polish Army(1.WP) Polish BA-20 were used since 1944 to January 1945. Polish divisions with BA-20 fought mainly near Warsaw. After January 1945 they were probably given back to the Soviets. Most probably had standard Soviet painting (dark geen/olive drab) with Polish insignias (white eagle).)
- BA-64
- BRDM-1
- BRDM-2
- FUG
- Honker
- AMZ Dzik-AT (AT for antyterrorystyczny - anti-terrorist) (with 3 doors, room for up to 8 people and 10 firing ports. It succeeded BTR-60 in Polish police)
- AMZ Dzik-2 armoured car (with 5 doors, room for up to 8 people, 8 firing ports and a rotating machine gun turret in the roof)
- AMZ Dzik Cargo (with 2 doors, 2 firing ports, room for up to 3 people and a cargo hold)
- AMZ Żubr New armoured personnel carrier, began production in 2008, can carry 10 fully equipped soldiers. Along with the standard variant are command and air defense variants.
- HMMWV Several variants designated as Tumak.
- M-ATV
- Cougar Operated by Polish forces during the war in Afghanistan
- MaxxPro Operated by Polish forces during the war in Afghanistan

== Armoured personnel carriers ==
- Sonderkraftfahrzeug 251/1 Ausführung D (Two, possibly more Sd.Kfz.-251/1 ausf. D were captured and used during the Warsaw Uprising in 1944. One was named "Szary Wilk" (in English - Grey Wolf. Originally named "Jas" - in English - "Johnny"), and was modified by adding an armoured roof made by adding two armour plates opening to the sides. When closed, they made a kind of a sloped "house roof" above the crew compartment. Between them and hull sides were rifle ports. At least one other Sd.Kfz.-251/1 ausf. D was captured and named "Starowka" which is the name of the oldest district of Warsaw.)
- Sonderkraftfahrzeug 250/10 leichte Schützenpanzerwagen (3.7 cm PaK) (It was captured and later used in 13th Polish Artillery Regiment of 1st Polish Army, March–May 1945, Poland. This vehicle was painted in standard ex-German colours: dark sand (dunkelgelb RAL 8002, FS 33275–33434). German cross was over painted by most probably green paint.)
- Universal Carrier
- BTR-40
- BTR-152
- BTR-60PU Armoured personnel carrier (Polish army used few BTR-60PU)
- BTR-60 Armoured personnel carrier (unknown variant details) (ZOMO and later Polish police used those armoured personnel carriers)
- TOPAS (Poland used about 200 of those until half of 1980s when they have been taken out service.)
- OT-64 SKOT-2A Armoured personnel carrier (also known by the Czechoslovak designation OT-64) (Polish-Czechoslovak armoured personnel carrier, armed with 1 14,5 mm KPWT high calibre machine gun, 1 7,62 mm PKT machine gun)
- OT-64 SKOT-2AP Armoured personnel carrier (also known by the Czechoslovak designation OT-64) (Polish-Czechoslovak Armoured personnel carrier, armed with 1 14,5 mm KPWT high calibre machine gun, 1 7,62 mm PKT machine gun)
- MT-LB
- M113 Used only as command vehicles
- KTO Rosomak (Kołowy Transporter Opancerzony Rosomak - Wheeled Armoured Carrier Wolverine) (Finish Patria AMV (Advanced Modular Vehicle) in Polish service. Poland uses 690 of those in APC, AFV and in various other configurations (delivered between 2004 and 2013). All of them have the ability to swim.)

== Infantry fighting vehicles ==
- BWP-2 (Poland used 60 of those but sold them to other countries)
- BWP-1 (Polish BMP-1 (Bojowy Wóz Piechoty - Infantry Fighting Vehicle))
- BWR-1S (Polish BRM-1 (Bojowy Wóz Rozpoznawczy - Combat Reconnaissance Vehicle))
- BWR-1K (Polish BRM-1K (Bojowy Wóz Rozpoznawczy - Combat Reconnaissance Vehicle))
- KTO Rosomak (Kołowy Transporter Opancerzony Rosomak - Wheeled Armoured Carrier Wolverine) (Finish Patria AMV (Advanced Modular Vehicle) in Polish service. Poland uses 313 of those in an AFV version with the Italian Oto Melara 30mm turret with the ability to swim (up-armoured version lost the ability to swim). Some of the Polish vehicles are currently employed in Afghanistan.)
- BWP Borsuk (Bojowy Wóz Piechoty Borsuk - Infantry Fighting Vehicle Badger)

== Tankettes ==
- Carden-Loyd Mark VI two man tankette (Poland ordered 10 or 11 of those two man tankettes on 29 June 1929. After the fall of Poland Polish units that made it to France used those two man tankettes in 1940)
- TK-1 tankette (based on Carden-Loyd Mark IV tankette, only 1 prototype built)
- TK-2 tankette (based on Carden-Loyd Mark IV tankette, only 1 prototype built)
- TK-3 tankette (based on TK-1 and TK-2 tankettes, about 300 built)
- TKW tankette (based on TK-3 tankette, only few build)
- TKD tankette (based on TK-1 and TK-2 tankettes, only 4 prototypes built)
- TKF tankette (based on TK-3 tankette, about 18 built)
- TKS tankette (based on TK-3 tankette, about 390 built)
- TKS-D tankette (based on TKS tankette, only 2 prototypes built)

== Tanks ==
=== Light tanks ===
- Renault FT light tank (Poland used 174 FT light tanks in different versions: char canon, char mitrailleuse, char signal, NC-1 and M 26/27). Used in the Polish–Ukrainian War in 1919.
- Renault FT CWS light tank (based on Renault FT light tank)
- 4TP light tank (Also known as PZInż.140 light tank) (only one prototype built)
- Renault Char léger Modèle 1935 R light Infantry tank (Poland used 50 of those tanks)
- Hotchkiss Char léger modèle 1935 H (Three Hotchkiss Char léger modèle 1935 H tanks had been exported to Poland in July 1939 for testing by the Polish Bureau of Technical Studies of Armoured Weapons (pl. Biuro Badań Technicznych Broni Pancernych). During the Invasion of Poland in 1939 the Hotchkiss Char léger modèle 1935 H tanks together with 3 Renault Char léger Modèle 1935 R tanks were incorporated into an ad hoc "half company" unit of lieutenant J.Jakubowicz formed on 14 September 1939 in Kiwerce, Poland. The unit joined the task force "Dubno" and lost all of its tanks during the marches and fighting with German and Soviet armies and Ukrainian insurgents.)
- Vickers 6-Ton Type A light tank (also known as Vickers Mark E) (Polish army used 38 of these tanks since 1932 with small improvements: 22 Type B and 16 Type A tanks)
- Vickers 6-Ton Type B light tank (also known as Vickers Mark E) (Polish army used 38 of these tanks since 1932 with small improvements: 22 Type B and 16 Type A tanks)
- 7TP dw light tank (based on Vickers 6-Ton light tank (also known as Vickers Mark E light tank))
- 7TP jw light tank (based on Vickers 6-Ton light tank (also known as Vickers Mark E light tank))
- 10TP light fast tank (Only one prototype built)
- T-70 light tank (In period between July 1943 to January 1945, Polish units in the east (Ludowe Wojsko Polskie) used 53 T-70s. Polish lost 12 T-70s in combat. T-70s were used mainly in 1st Polish Tank Regiment (Pierwszy Pułk Czolgów), the 3rd Training Tank Regiment (Trzeci Szkolny Pułk Czołgów) and at least one in 27th Regiment of Self-propelled Altillery (Dwudziesty siódmy Pułk Artylerii Samobieżnej). The Polish High Officers Tank School had 18 units. After World War II, Polish T-70s were used in combat against the Ukrainian UPA (Nationalist) units in years 1945–1947. A T-70 was found in the Bieszczady forest and restored. It is now in very good condition and on exhibition in High Officer Tank School at Poznań city.(Wyzsza Szkoła Wojsk Pancernych w Poznaniu).)
- PL-01 light tank (first announced in 2013)

=== Medium tanks ===
- Panzerkampfwagen III Ausführung G medium tank (3 Panzerkampfwagen III Ausführung G were captured by the Carpathian Lancers in Egypt in 1941. All three were numbered consecutively 1 to 3. All vehicles were used for training only.)
- M4A4 Sherman V medium tank (The M4 Sherman was the basic tank in Polish armoured units in the West 1943–1947. The 1st Armoured Division, fighting from Falaise (France) to Wilhelmshaven (Germany) used M4A4 Sherman V and M4A4 Sherman VC Firefly and from December 1944 - M4A1(76)W Sherman IIA.)
- M4A4 Sherman VC Firefly medium tank (The M4 Sherman was the basic tank in Polish armoured units in the West 1943–1947. The 1st Armoured Division, fighting from Falaise (France) to Wilhelmshaven (Germany) used M4A4 Sherman V and M4A4 Sherman VC Firefly and from December 1944 - M4A1(76)W Sherman IIA.)
- M4A1(76)W Sherman IIA medium tank (The M4 Sherman was the basic tank in Polish armoured units in the West 1943–1947. The 1st Armoured Division, fighting from Falaise (France) to Wilhelmshaven (Germany) used M4A4 Sherman V and M4A4 Sherman VC Firefly and from December 1944 - M4A1(76)W Sherman IIA.)
- M4A2 Sherman III medium tank (The Sherman was the basic tank in Polish armoured units in the West 1943–1947. The 2nd Warsaw Armored Brigade, fighting in Italy, used M4A2 Sherman III, later also M4 Sherman I, M4 Sherman IC Firefly, M4A1 Sherman II and M4A3 (105) HVSS Sherman IVBY.)
- M4 Sherman I medium tank (The Sherman was the basic tank in Polish armoured units in the West 1943–1947. The 2nd Warsaw Armored Brigade, fighting in Italy, used M4A2 Sherman III, later also M4 Sherman I, M4 Sherman IC Firefly, M4A1 Sherman II and M4A3 (105) HVSS Sherman IVBY.)
- M4 Sherman IC Firefly medium tank (The Sherman was the basic tank in Polish armoured units in the West 1943–1947. The 2nd Warsaw Armored Brigade, fighting in Italy, used M4A2 Sherman III, later also M4 Sherman I, M4 Sherman IC Firefly, M4A1 Sherman II and M4A3 (105) HVSS Sherman IVBY.)
- M4A1 Sherman II medium tank (The Sherman was the basic tank in Polish armoured units in the West 1943–1947. The 2nd Warsaw Armored Brigade, fighting in Italy, used M4A2 Sherman III, later also M4 Sherman I, M4 Sherman IC Firefly, M4A1 Sherman II and M4A3 (105) HVSS Sherman IVBY.)
- M4A3 (105) HVSS Sherman IVBY medium tank (The Sherman was the basic tank in Polish armoured units in the West 1943–1947. The 2nd Warsaw Armored Brigade, fighting in Italy, used M4A2 Sherman III, later also M4 Sherman I, M4 Sherman IC Firefly, M4A1 Sherman II and M4A3 (105) HVSS Sherman IVBY.)
- M4A1 "Grizzly" (Though this tank is preserved at the Polish Army Museum. There is no evidence that the Polish army ever used this vehicle. The vehicle was obtained after the demise of the USSR.)
- Panzerkampfwagen IV Ausführung H medium tank (At least one Panzerkampfwagen IV Ausführung H was used by the Warsaw Tank Brigade of the 2nd Corps in Italy in 1944.)
- T-34/76 Model 1942 medium tank (Polish had 71 T-34/76 Model 1942 and T-34/76 Model 1943 medium tanks.)
- T-34/76 Model 1943 medium tank (Polish had 71 T-34/76 Model 1942 and T-34/76 Model 1943 medium tanks.)
- T-34/85 medium tank
- T-34.85M1 medium tank (Polish refurbishing program, similar to Soviet Model 1960)
- T-34/85M2 medium tank (Polish refurbishing program, similar to Soviet Model 1969)

=== Cruiser tanks ===
- Cromwell Cruiser tank (Used by Polish 1st Armoured Division (Polish 1 Dywizja Pancerna))
- Crusader Cruiser tank (Used by Polish 1st Armoured Division (Polish 1 Dywizja Pancerna))

=== Infantry tanks ===
- Mark I Matilda I (A11) Infantry tank (In the years between 1940 and 1942, Polish units used 18 Matilda I Mark I (A11) tanks. First by the 10th Brygada Kawalerii Pancernej (Armor Cavalry Brigade), which guarded of a part of Scotland's beaches near Dundee and Montrose. After 1941, the Matildas were sent to training units for the teaching of mechanical techniques and driving. In 1942, the British received all the Matilda I Mark I (A11) tanks back from the Polish.)
- Mark IV Churchill (A22) Infantry tank (Used by Polish 1st Armoured Division (Polska 1 Dywizja Pancerna))

=== Heavy tanks ===
- IS-2 (also known IS-122) heavy tank (Poland used 71 of those tanks)
- IS-3 heavy tank (Polish Army received only two IS-3 tanks. These tanks were delivered in 1946. The first was used in Military Technic Academy at Warsaw (Wojskowa Akademia Techniczna), second Polish IS-3 was sent to Officers Armor School (Oficerska Szkola Wojsk Pancernych) at Poznań city. (this IS-3 is still on exhibition.))

=== Main battle tanks ===
- T-54 main battle tank
- T-55 main battle tank
- T-55A main battle tank
- T-55 AM Merida main battle tank (modernized T-55 main battle tank)
- T-55AD-2M main battle tank (modernized T-55 main battle tank, a command variant)
- T-55AMS main battle tank (modernized T-55 main battle tank)
- T-55AD-1M main battle tank (modernized T-55 main battle tank)
- T-72 main battle tank
- T-72M main battle tank
- T-72M1 main battle tank
- T-72M1D main battle tank
- T-72M1M main battle tank
- PT-91 "Twardy" main battle tank (based on T-72M1 main battle tank, 233 built)
- T-72M1Z main battle tank (T-72M1 main battle tank upgraded to PT-91 "Twardy" main battle tank standard)
- PT-94 "Goryl" main battle tank (Project of a Polish main battle tank designed using experience gained on PT-91 project. The tank would be similar in its design to Merkava. This program was also known under the name Anders. The program was cancelled due to lack of funds.)
- PT-91A "Twardy" main battle tank (first proposition for export)
- PT-91Z "Twardy" main battle tank (demonstrator of export variant showed on military exhibitions)
- PT-91M "Twardy" main battle tank (production export variant for Malaysia, 48 built)
- PT-91E "Twardy" main battle tank (demonstrator of export variant showed on MSPO 2006 military exhibitions, Poland)
- Leopard 2 main battle tank
- K2 Black Panther main battle tank

== Tank destroyers ==
- Jagdpanzer 38(t) (Sonderkraftfahrzeug 138/2) "Hetzer" (one captured during the Warsaw Uprising and was nicknamed "Chwat".).
- Mark I Valentine SP 17pdr Archer tank destroyer (Used by 7th anti-tank artillery regiment of 2nd Polish Corp in Italy, 1944)
- SU-76 (SU-76 was one of the main tank destroyers of Polish units in Soviet army and later of the Ludowe Wojsko Polskie (LWP, or People's Army of Poland) which was army of the Polska Rzeczpospolita Ludowa (PRL, or People's Republic of Poland))
- SU-100 (Polish Army received two SU-100s during World War II from the Soviets. More were delivered after the war. The Poles used these self-propelled guns into the late 50s. Some of them were rebuilt into engineering vehicles. One SU-100 is on exhibition in NATO Officer Armor School at Poznań in Poland.)
- SU-57 (also known as T48) (One of the least known American tank destroyers. Armed with a 57 mm main gun, this halftrack was not produced in series for the USA (hence its "T" designation). GMC did produce the vehicle for the British. By the time it entered service, the main gun was found wanting. Instead, the 650 vehicles were shipped to the USSR, who at the time wanted anything they could get. A small number found their way into the Polish People's Army in 1945. One of them is currently at the Polish Army Museum in Warsaw.)
- SU-85 (Polish received SU-85 number 324 built in Factory no.402221 Swierdlovsk and used in the 13th Polish Artillery Regiment.)
- 2P27 tank destroyer
- M10

== Self-propelled guns ==
- ISU-122 (Polish Army received 22 ISU-122 self-propelled guns from the Soviets during the Summer of 1944. Polish ISU-122 took part in the battles in Czechoslovakia and the Berlin Operation. Polish lost 16 units in combat. You may still see four ISU-122 in Poland today. They are located at the Museum of the Polish Army at Warsaw, The Military Museum at Kołobrzeg, The Military Museum at Poznań, and at The Officers NATO Armor School at Poznań.)
- ISU-152 (The Poles received 10 ISU-152s from the USSR (more were received after the war). The first were delivered in November 1944. It was ISU no.40532 joined to 3rd Training Tank Regiment (Szkolny Pulk Czolgow). Polish ISU-152s were used in combat during the battles on Wal Pomorski (Baltic harbour), near Szczecin city, (old North Prussia), and in the Berlin Operation. During the Berlin Operation, the 13th Polish Artillery Regiment equipped with SU-85 and ISU-152 fought near Klietz city and went deep into German territory. Polish ISU-152 were scrapped in early 60s. Some of these ISU were rebuilt to engineering vehicles. Today there are three surviving ISU-152s in Poland (at the Officers Tank School at Poznań, in the Military Museum at Kolobrzeg and in the Historical Museum at Dukla).)
- SU-152 (Polish Army received three Soviet SU-152s. Two were given to the Officers Tank School and one to the 3rd Training Tank Regiment. All three Polish SUs were used as trainers in years 1945-`49. One SU-152 is on exhibition on cemetery of Soviet soldiers at Cybinka in Poland.)
- ASU-57
- ASU-85
- 2S7 Pion (Poland used those from 1985 to 2006)
- ShKH DANA wz. 1977 (Poland uses those since 1983)
- 2S1 "Goździk" (Poland uses 533 of those)
- Krab

== Self-propelled anti-aircraft weapons ==
- Crusader III AA Mark III (Used in France in 1944)
- ZSU-57-2
- Hibneryt
- ZSU-23-4 "Szyłka"
- PZA "Loara" armoured radar directed Self Propelled Anti-Aircraft Gun system (based on PT-91 "Twardy" main battle tank, only a small number was built)

== Amphibious vehicles ==
- PZInż 130 amphibious tank (based on 4TP light tank (Also known as PZInż.140 light tank), only one prototype built)
- PT-76 amphibious light tank (Poland used 30 of those tanks)
- PTS

== See also ==
- Armoured fighting vehicle
- Polish Armed Forces
- List of armoured fighting vehicles
- List of armoured fighting vehicles by country
