= Lists of armoured fighting vehicles =

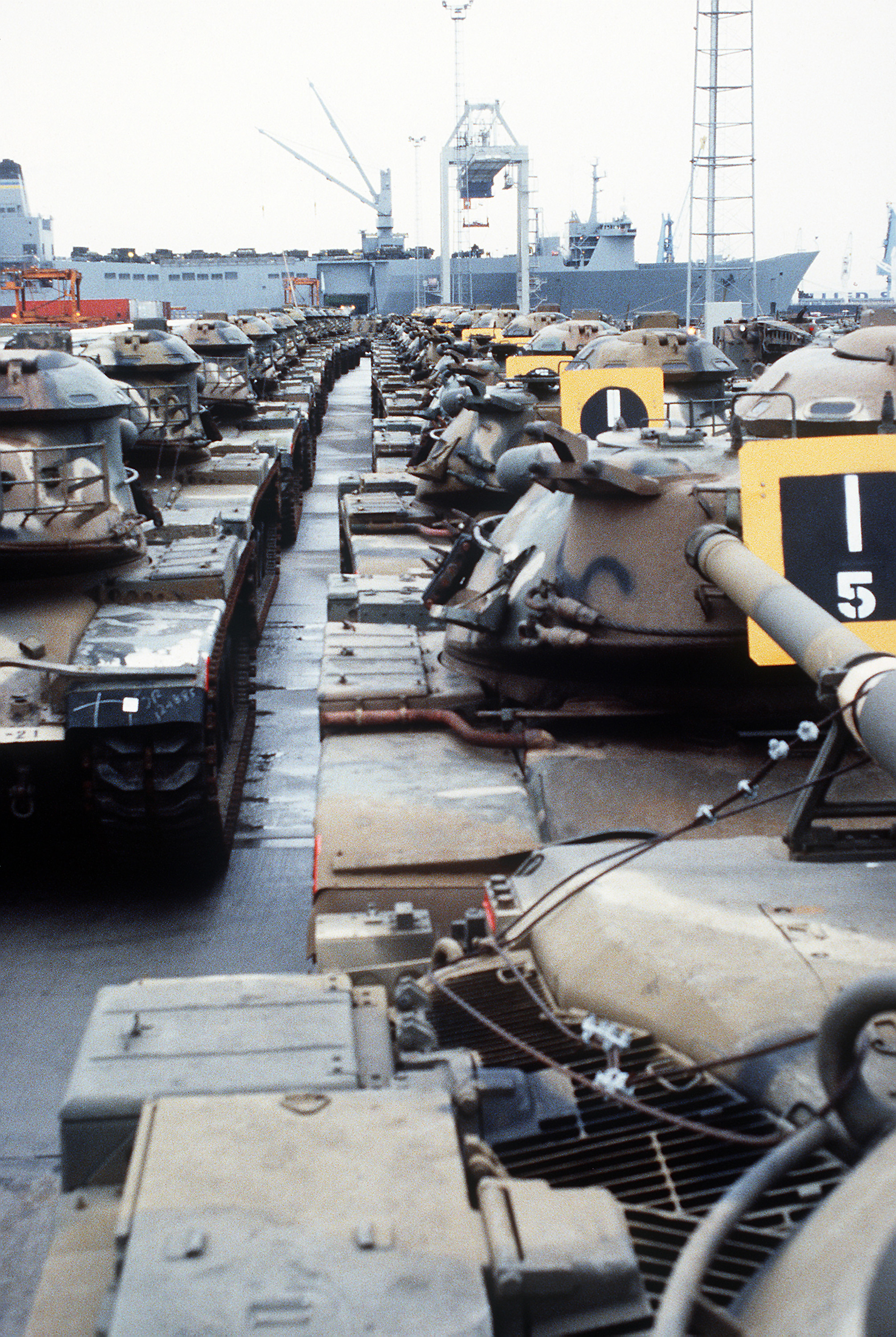

This is a list of lists of armoured fighting vehicles.

== By period ==
- List of armoured fighting vehicles of World War I
- List of interwar armoured fighting vehicles
- List of military vehicles of World War II
- List of armoured fighting vehicles of World War II
- List of modern armoured fighting vehicles
- List of main battle tanks by generation

== By country ==
- List of armoured fighting vehicles by country
- List of Sd.Kfz. designations (Germany from 1939)
- Tanks of Japan (Japan up to present)
- List of Polish armoured fighting vehicles
- List of tanks of the Soviet Union
- List of armoured fighting vehicles of Ukraine
- List of tanks of the United Kingdom (United Kingdom up to 1945)
- List of FV series military vehicles (United Kingdom after 1945)
- List of "M" series military vehicles (United States)

== By type ==
- List of armoured trains
- List of artillery, including self-propelled guns
- List of main battle tanks by country
- List of experimental tanks by country

== See also ==
- Armoured fighting vehicle classification
- Tank
- Tank classification
- History of the tank
