= Triton (armored vehicle) =

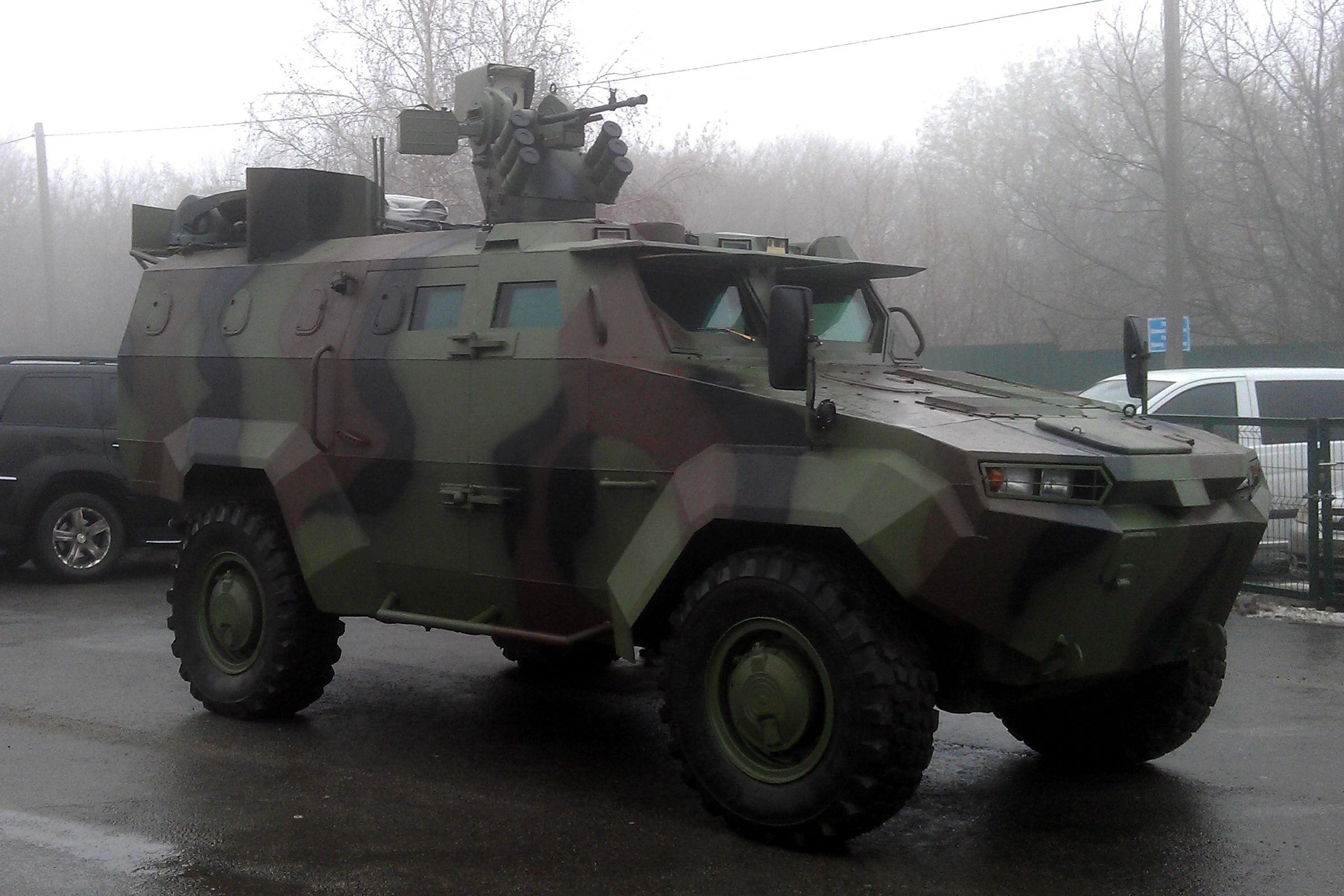
- A Triton-01.
- Type: Armored personnel carrier with MRAP capabilities
- Place of origin: Ukraine

Production history
- Designer: Kuznia na Rybalskomu
- Designed: Before 2015
- Produced: 2015–unknown
- No. built: 4 production, 2 prototype

Specifications
- Mass: 10 t
- Crew: 3 + 8 passengers
- Armor: Steel
- Engine: 5.7-liter Volvo TAD620VE 6-cylinder diesel 211 hp
- Transmission: Allison 1000 CP automatic 5-speed (early) ZF ZTO 1006 (later)
- Suspension: 4x4
- Ground clearance: 0.45 m (1.5 ft)
- Maximum speed: 110 km/h

The Triton is a Ukrainian 4x4 armored personnel carrier designed by the Ukrainian Kuznia na Rybalskomu design company.

== History ==
Development of the Triton-01 began some time in 2014. The vehicle first became known on January 30, 2015, when representatives of Kuznia na Rybalskomu announced the production of the Triton.

The Triton-01's first public appearance was at the Kyiv Arms Show in 2016. The vehicle was developed in order to meet the Ukrainian military's needs for an advanced light armored vehicle.

In 2016, the Ukrainian National Guard announced that it would purchase 60 Triton-01s. That same year, the Ukrainian Border Guards also announced that they would be ordering 62 Triton-01s.

By the Russian Invasion in 2022, only three Triton-01s and one BM Triton had been delivered to the Ukrainian military. This was due to corruption in the Kuznia na Rybalskomu company and their lack of experience in building military equipment.

== Design ==
The Triton-01 uses a standard vehicle layout, with three crew located in the front (driver, commander, gunner) and room for eight additional passengers in the rear of the vehicle. The Triton uses the same chassis as the Dozor-B.

The crew is protected by STANAG 4569 Level 2A armor plating and bulletproof glass.

The Triton-01 also mounts a single remotely-controlled turret armed with a 12.7mm NSVT machine gun and a 40mm automatic grenade launcher.

The early production variant of the Triton was amphibious and equipped with propellers, however this feature was not included in the later Triton-01 and BM Triton.

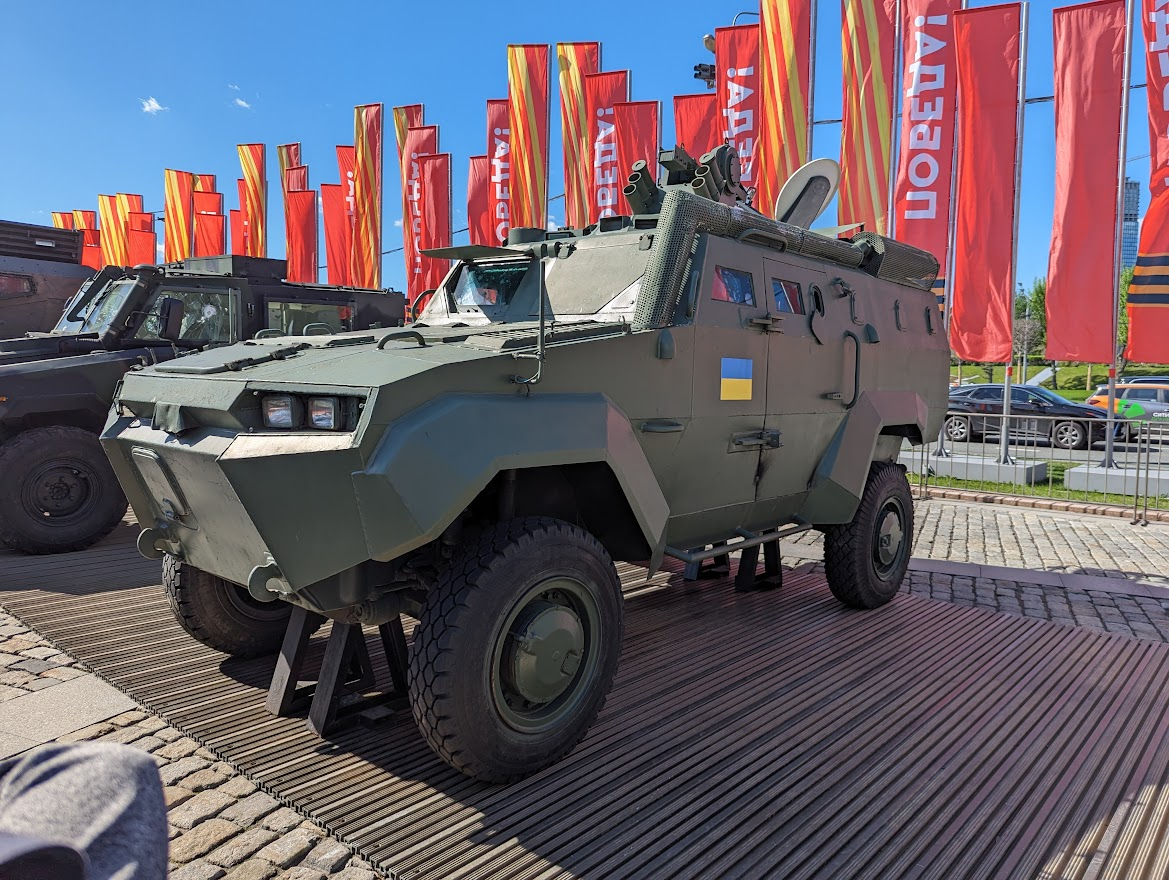
Captured Ukrainian BM Triton on display in Russia.

== Service history ==
By 2022, only four Tritons had been produced and delivered to the Ukrainian military as ordered. All four vehicles were deployed to front line areas following the Russian invasion of Ukraine. By June of 2022, all but one Triton had been captured by Russian forces.

== Variants ==
- Triton: early production variant.
- Triton-01: improved late production variant.
- BM Triton: upgraded variant with modernized weapons systems.

== Operators ==
- Ukraine: 1
- Russia: 3 (captured)
