= Aleksandr Morozov (engineer) =

Soviet tank designer and engineer

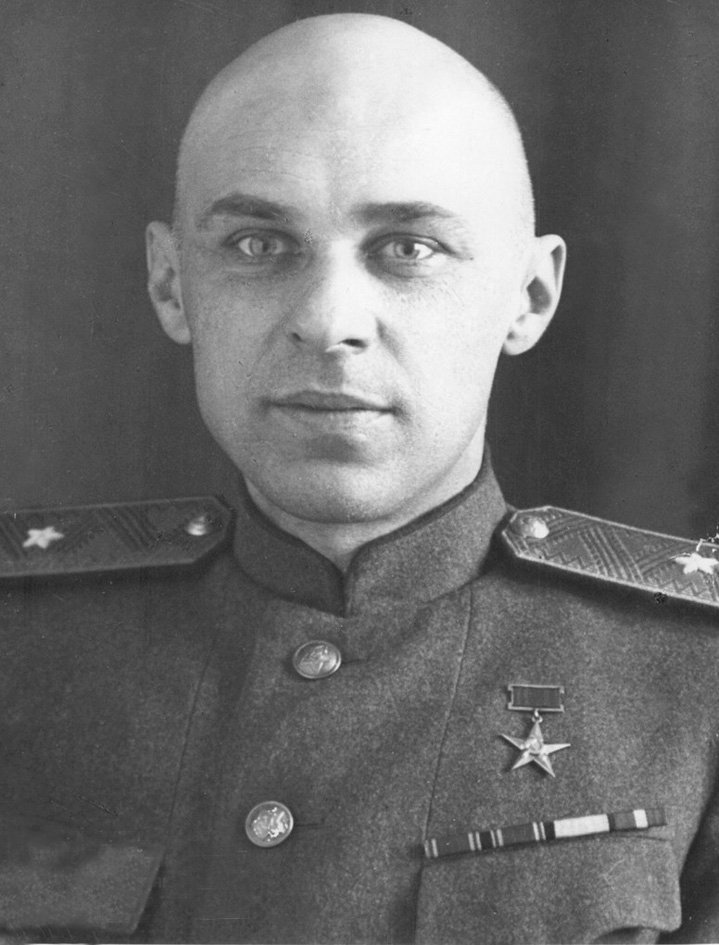
- Morozov in 1948
- Born: 29 October 1904; Bezhitsa, Bryansky Uyezd, Oryol Governorate, Russian Empire
- Died: 14 June 1979 (aged 74); Kharkov, Ukrainian SSR, Soviet Union
- Education: Moscow Polytechnic University
- Military career
- Branch: Red Army
- Rank: Major general

Aleksander Aleksandrovich Morozov (Russian: Александр Александрович Морозов; Ukrainian: Олександр Олександрович Морозов, romanized: Oleksandr Oleksandrovych Morozov; 29 October 1904 – 14 June 1979) was a Soviet tanks designer, general, major-engineer (1945), and doctor of technical sciences (1972). He was awarded the Hero of the Socialist Labour award in 1942 and 1974.

Morozov took part in the development of the first domestic tank, the T-24 (1930), and also the wheel-caterpillar BT-2 (1931), BT-5 (1932), BT-7 (1935) and BT-7M (1939) light tanks. As the technical lead of the project together with M. I. Koshkin and N. A. Kucherenko headed development of the medium T-34 tank in 1940. During the Second World War, he was the chief designer of upgrades of the T-34 tank, which was recognized as one of the best Soviet tanks of the Second World War. After the war, under the direction of Morozov, a number of new types of tanks were created. The Deputy of Supreme Council of the USSR of the 5th convocation awarded state awards of the USSR (1942, 1946, 1948) and Lenin Prize (1967) to Morozov. He was awarded three Orders of Lenin, Order of the October Revolution, the Orders of Kutuzov of the 1st degree, Order of Suvorov of the 2nd degree, three awards of the Labour Red Banner, an award of the Red Star and other medals.

== Career ==
The fourteen-year-old teenager A. A. Morozov, having got a six-year education at the Moscow Mechanical Institute, came in March 1919 to the engine-building plant in Kharkiv, Ukraine. His labor activity began in technical office of the factory as the filing clerk. Further work as a copyist, draftsman, and designer acquainted him with creation at the factory of the first chain track tractor, the "Communar". In 1928 A. A. Morozov returned to the factory after service in the Red Army (as an air brigade aviation technician) Morozov as a part of design group provided production of a prototype of the maneuverable T-1-12 tank, and then participated in designing and release of the subsequent modification of the tank which received the T-24 brand. This tank was one of the first tanks of a domestic design, in it were the powerful engine and a number of original nodes of transmission were established.

The period of 1929–1931 was associated for A. A. Morozov with study on correspondence department of the Moscow automotive institute of M. V. Lomonosov, and then – on evening department of the Kharkiv machine-building technical school. Upon termination of technical school Morozov was directly involved in designing and development of serial production of the BT wheel-caterpillar tank. It designed many nodes and details of transmission and a running gear of the tank which was issued for a number of years in the form of gradually the enhanced modifications (from BT-2 to BT-7M). At this stage of design activities A. A. Morozov in a short space of time gained considerable experience, reached the level of the chief designer, began to direct design group and since July 1936 headed sector of CB on new designing.

In the second half of the 30th years the task on substantial was increase of shell firmness of armored corpus of tanks and increase in their survivability in the battlefield was set for designers of the factory. Designing of the wheel-caterpillar A-20 tank with increased, in comparison with the BT tank, quantity of the leading wheels skating rinks and with the case and a tower of an original form was one of important developments of that period. During the course of performance this work for the purpose of check of a possibility of simplification of a design of the tank it was decided to design in addition the tank, close in parameters, but without the independent wheel course. The new A-32 tank in many parts was the same as A-20: similar configuration and form of the case, same V-2 engine diesel. Separate constructive decisions, such as some nodes of transmission and a running gear without basic changes were used in BT, A-20 and A-32 tanks.

=== World War II ===
At the end of 1938 both projects (A-20 and A-32) were submitted for consideration of the Main Council of War of Red Army where M. I. Koshkin is the chief designer of the factory of a name of Komintern and A. A. Morozov – his deputy made reports of their work. As a result, after discussion of introduced drafts permission to production of both tanks, having tested them to make a final choice of one of them for acceptance on arms was got. In June–August 1939 comparative testing were carried out. No essential benefits of the wheel-caterpillar tank in comparison with caterpillar were revealed, and in conclusions of the commission it was written down: "the A-32 tank as the having inventory on increase in weight, it is reasonable to protect more powerful armor, having respectively increased durability of separate details …" Therefore, soon the A-32 tank was finished loading to 24 tons and will put on additional trials. Testing confirmed a possibility of increasing the mass of the tank approximately by 5 tonnes, that allowed to increase case armor thickness from 20 to 45 mm and to strengthen a number of nodes and aggregates. The committee of Defense in case of Council of People's Commissars of the USSR the resolution of 19 December 1939 accepted the new average tank to production at the Kharkiv plant of a name of Komintern, having appropriated it the T-34 brand.

Due to the innovative approach to solving the complex challenge of creating the average tank of new generation, the designers directed—initially led by M. I. Koshkin, and after his death by A. A. Morozov—shortly before the beginning of the Great Patriotic War created the average T-34 tank. For the first time in the world, they succeeded in combining optimum high rates of fire power, anti-whizband protection and mobility with low production cost, reliability and simplicity in operation.

The State award USSR was awarded by the order of the Government in 1942 for development of a design of the T-34 tank to Alexander Aleksandrovich Morozov, Mikhail Ilyich Koshkin and Nikolay Alekseevich Kucherenko who were during this period the chief of CB of serial production of the plant.

Work at the Kharkov's factory by Comintern in the prewar years was not limited to the formulation of the production of the T-34. The group of designers, itself headed by A.A. Morozov, continued to search for ways to further improve the medium tanks. As a result of the continuation of this work in the 1942–1944 years at the Ural's tank factory were developed even more powerful medium tanks T-43 and T-44.

In the early days of World War II, the Soviet government has set task for designers-tank-builders to ensure a significant expansion of the T-34 tank production, their production was transferred to several factories of the Volga region, the Urals, in Siberia. Development of production of T-34 tanks by factories with different equipment composition, with low qualification of the majority of workers, many of whom were adolescents and women, made possible by good process flue design, that to a large extent, in addition to the work of engineers, determined in the daily hard work of designers on simplification of the tank, finding substitutes for scarce materials, adapting its design to mass production. However, the battle characteristics of tank T-34 are continuously improved and in the second half of 1943 the tank was radically modernized, with a new turret and a powerful 85-mm cannon. This was a response to the new German Panther and Tiger tanks and Elefant Ferdinand tank destroyers. The efforts to improve the design of the T-34 and increase its armaments were directed by Morozov and his deputy N.A. Kucherenko, designers Y.I. Baran, A.A. Moloshtanov, M.I. Tarshinov, B.A. Chernyak, A.I. Shpayhler and others. All of them for a fundamental improvement of the existing medium tank design and development of a new medium tank was awarded the State Prize of the USSR.

During the years of World War II Morozov was released and transferred to 52nd Army, to work with T-34s. Within these factory groups, the directors were U.E. Maksarev, E.E. Rubinchik B. G. Myzrukov, K.A. Zadorozhnyy. After the war, several hundred T-34 tanks were mounted on pedestals, to become monuments in honour of the heroism of Soviet tankmen during World War II.

In the difficult years of the war, Morozov giving himself entirely to work, achieved outstanding success in strengthening the combat power of the armored forces of the Red Army, for which he was in January 1943 awarded the title Hero of Socialist Labor, and was later awarded the highest military leader orders: Kutuzov Class I, and Suvorov II degree. He was promoted to the rank of Major-General of engineering and tank service. Design Bureau, led by Morozov, was awarded the Order of Lenin.

=== Post World War II ===
The post-war period of the Morozov associated with the continuation of the line of the development of mass medium tanks, partially embodied in the final stages of the war in the T-44. The whole wealth of experience in the production and use of the T-34 tank was used on the T-54 and T-55. Their designs were reflected many of the achievements of science and technology of the postwar period, as a result of which they were created and put into mass production, in particular, weapons stabilizers, electronic night-vision goggles, equipment for underwater driving system of protection against weapons of mass destruction, and others. Medium tanks the first post-war generation, started under the guidance and the ideas of Morozov, had high combat characteristics, and they are simple in design and reliable in operation. Their development was attended by many designers KB, including P.P. Vasilyev, V.G. Matyuhin, V.K. Baydakov, A.V. Kolesnikov. For the development of the T-54 A.A. Morozov was the third time awarded the USSR State Prize.

In the second half of the 50s, the creative life of Morozov was associated with laying the foundations of the design of the second generation of postwar period tanks. Morozov was a supporter of the revolutionary development of armored vehicles. Much of the Eastern Bloc was involved in the research organization of industry in conjunction with the Ministry of Defence. Particular attention was paid to minimizing the volume and weight characteristics of various components and assemblies. The development of the T-64 was carried out by close associates of Morozov: Y.I. Baranov, E.V. Morozov, M.A. Nabutovskii, B.N. Poliakov, G.A. Omelyanovich, M.G. Stepanov. The design featured new improvements in engine size, and a redesigned fire control system, ejection cooling system, and a new light weight chassis. For this work, A.A. Morozov, together with Y.A. Baran, L.L. Golints, V.I. Kreopalov, V.S. Staravojtov was awarded the Lenin Prize in 1967.

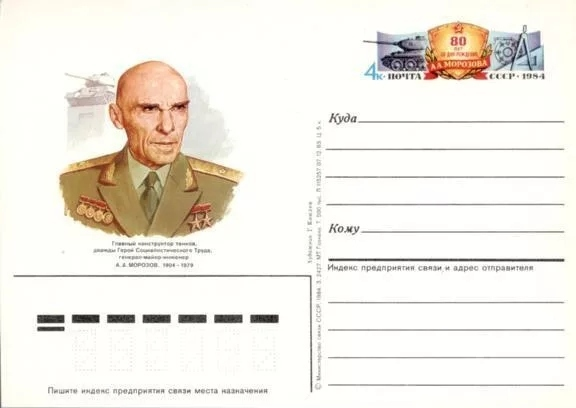
Picture of Morozov on envelope of USSR

Labor way of Alexander Alexandrovich Morozov's was adequately marked the highest awards. It was in 1974 for the second time marked by the rank of the Hero of Socialist Labor. He was awarded many medals and ten medals of USSR. Member of the Communist Party in 1943, he was elected deputy of the Supreme Soviet of the USSR. He was awarded the academic knowledge of Doctor of Technical Sciences, Honored machine building Engineer of the USSR.

"Tanks and People" – the second part of the diary Morozov was published 9 May 2007. In this unique material describes the dramatic events occur in the early to mid 70s in the domestic tank building: final design of the T-64 and development of prospective "T-74".
