= Dozor-B =

KhMDB Dozor-B
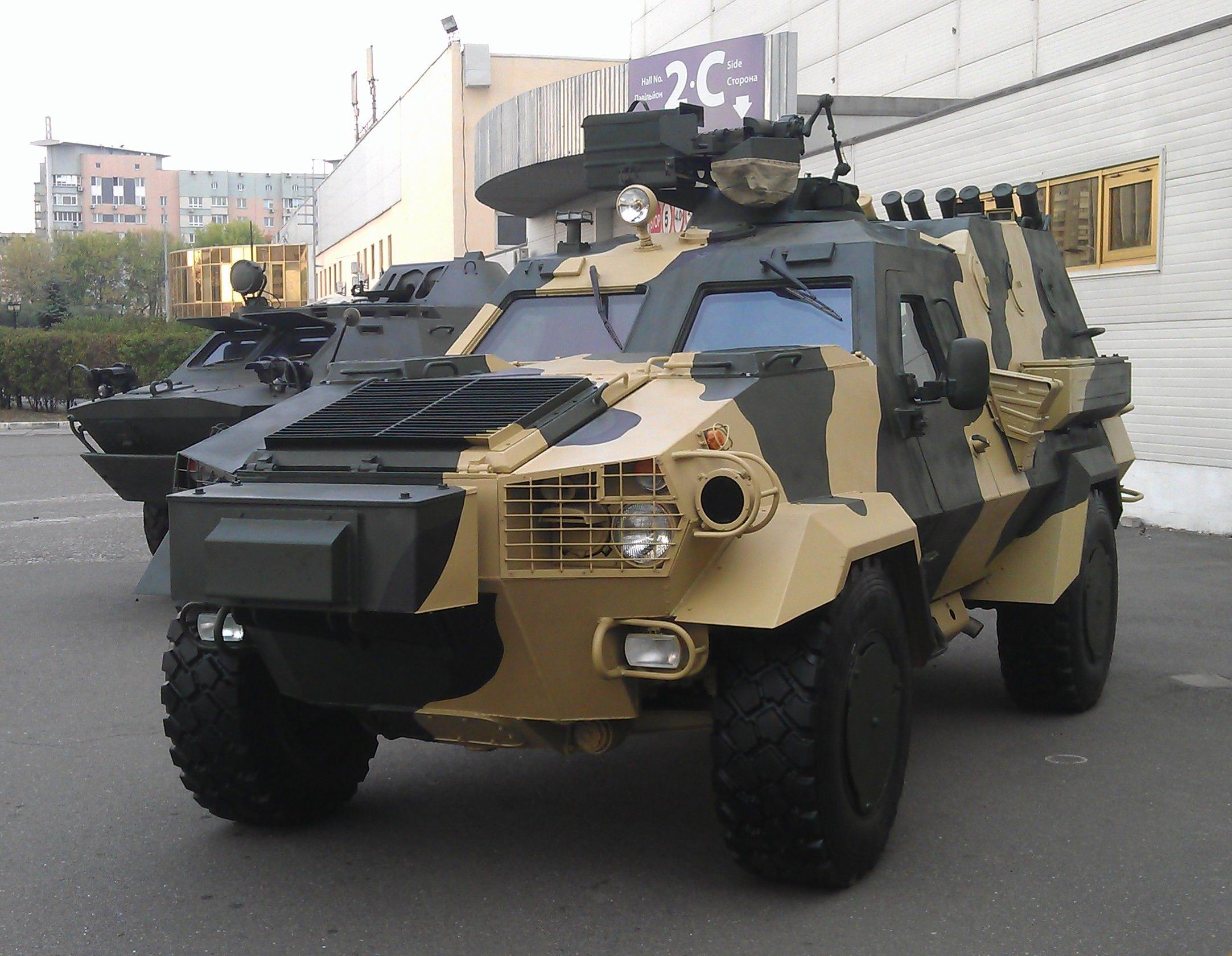
- Dozor-B on display at the Zbroya ta Bezpeka 2015 event
- Type: Infantry mobility vehicle
- Place of origin: Ukraine

Service history
- In service: since July 2016
- Used by: Ukrainian Armed Forces; Armed Forces of Senegal

Production history
- Designer: KhMDB
- Designed: 2004-2007
- Manufacturer: Malyshev Factory (until 2014); Lviv Tank Repair Plant (since 2014)
- Produced: September 2013 - April 2016 (Oncilla)
- No. built: >100

Specifications
- Mass: 6.3 t
- Length: 5.4m
- Width: 2.4m
- Crew: 3 + 8
- Armor: steel
- Main armament: 1 × 12.7 NSVT
- Engine: Deutz BF 4M 1013FC (diesel); 190 hp
- Suspension: 4x4
- Operational range: 750 km
- Maximum speed: 100 km/h

The Dozor-B (Ukrainian: Дозор-Б) is a four-wheeled Ukrainian armored car.

The Dozor-B is also used by special units of the armed forces (quick reaction forces and military police) to carry out reconnaissance, patrolling, and peace-keeping operations, as well as being used as the main transportation vehicle under combat conditions (including NBC environment).

== History ==
The first prototype of Dozor-B was first shown in October 2004.

10 Dozor-B were delivered to the Armed Forces of Ukraine in June 2016, before further orders were cancelled due production delays and manufacturing defects.

In August 2019 was announced that Ukrainian MoD will purchase Polish Oncilla instead of Dozor-B. The Oncilla is a Polish-licensed variant produced by MISTA. As of March 2023, at least 30 Oncillas are in Ukrainian service.

== Design ==
=== Layout ===
The layout of the armoured personnel carrier is based on a motor-car scheme. The vehicle is divided into two main compartments: power pack compartment and crew compartment.

The power pack compartment occupies the front and central parts of the hull and is separated from the crew compartment by an air-tight vibration/noise-insulating bulkhead. The compartment accommodates the engine with its operation support systems, transmission, main elements of the steering system, air system, braking system, and components of the air conditioning system and heating system.

The crew compartment occupies the central and rear parts of the hull and is used for accommodating the crew, installing the assemblies required for operation of the crew, and placing various equipment, ammunition, and SPTA. The crew compartment is divided into the driving compartment, fighting compartment, and troop compartment.

The driving compartment is located in the front part of the crew compartment and comprises the driver’s station fitted with armoured personnel carrier controls, and the commander’s station fitted with communications devices and navigation equipment.

The fighting compartment is located in the central part of the crew compartment and comprises the gunner’s station fitted with machine gun laying and control devices.

The troop compartment is located in the rear part of the crew compartment and comprises seats for troops, periscopic vision blocks, and firing ports to enable the troops to carry out observation and to fire small arms.

The crew compartment accommodates the filtering and ventilating unit and the main components of the ventilation, heating, and air conditioning systems.

=== Protection ===
The armoured hull of the personnel carrier provides protection of the crew, troops, and internal equipment against small arms fire, anti-tank mines, and effects of the mass destruction weapons.

The hull is made of armour and provides protection against 7.62 mm armour-piercing bullets. The bottom of the armoured personnel carrier is made of armour steel in a cylindrical shape and provides protection against mines. The armoured glass installed on the armoured personnel carrier provides protection that is identical to the protection provided by the main armour of the vehicle.

The design of the hull makes it possible to install additional protection array in the form of removable components that will provide protection against larger calibre bullets and more powerful mines.

The vehicle is fitted with a filtering and ventilating unit, which is intended to purify the ambient air in order to remove toxic agents, radioactive dust, and biological warfare aerosols; to feed the purified air into the crew compartment; to create overpressure in the crew compartment; and to remove firing powder gases from the crew compartment.

=== Armament ===
The main armament is a 12.7 mm remote-controlled anti-aircraft NSVT machine gun that can be elevated within a range of - 3° to +68° and traversed through a full 360°. The machine gun is fitted with a PZU-7 optical monocular periscopic sight, which provides a magnification of 1.2 and a field of view of 50°.

=== Observations Devices ===
The surrounding terrain can be observed through the armoured glass windows and the day-time observation devices. The driver can also use the TVN-5 biocular, periscopic, active/passive night vision device in order to drive the armoured personnel carrier under poor visibility conditions or at night.

=== Power Pack ===
The vehicle can be fitted with either Iveco 8142.38.11 engine or Deutz BF 4M 1013 FC engine. Each of the two is a four-stroke four-cylinder turbocharged diesel engine with intermediate cooling of turbocharged air.

==== Power Transmission ====
The power transmission is mechanical. It provides a constant transmission of torque from the engine to all the wheels. The power transmission comprises the following: gearbox, transfer box, wheel reducers, front and rear main transmissions, and cardan shaft.

=== Communications and Navigation Devices ===
For external communications, the vehicle is fitted with the R-173M ultra-short wave, receiving/transmitting radio set and R-173PM radio receiver operating in a frequency range of 30,000-75,999 kHz; for internal communications, with the AVSK-1 crew intercom system.

The vehicle's radio navigation equipment continuously determines the coordinates of location, the time and the vector of absolute travelling speed of the vehicle by using radio signals of the GLONASS and GPS NAVSTAR systems.

=== Crew Comfort Support Systems ===
The vehicle is fitted with a ventilation system, heating system, and air conditioning system.

The ventilation system with forced air circulation is intended to supply fresh air into the crew compartment and to remove powder gases when the troops fire their small arms when the filtering and ventilating unit is switched off.

The heating system of the liquid type provides crew comfort in cold weather due to the heating of the air in the crew compartment and blowing the heated air to the window glasses.

The air conditioning system provides crew comfort in hot weather due to the cooling or ventilation in the armoured personnel carrier. The system ensures the following:

- cooling of air at ambient air temperatures of 20 to 55 degrees Celsius
- ventilation of air without cooling or heating it in the entire operating temperature range of the armoured personnel carrier

=== Special Equipment ===
The vehicle's special equipment includes a central tyre inflation system and a winch. The central tyre inflation system provides automatic regulation of preselected tyre pressure and makes it possible to check and change tyre pressure from the driver’s station to allow for road conditions.

The WARN XD 9000i winch is intended for self-recovery of the armoured personnel carrier, as well as for recovery of other stuck-in vehicles of the same weight class.

== Variants ==
- Dozor-A - unarmored off-road general purpose vehicle
- Dozor-B - armored vehicle. The versions of the Dozor-B include the following vehicles:

- armoured personnel carrier
- armoured vehicle
- NBC reconnaissance vehicle
- command vehicle
- ambulance
- reconnaissance vehicle
- general purpose vehicle

- Oncilla Polish produced version

== Operators ==
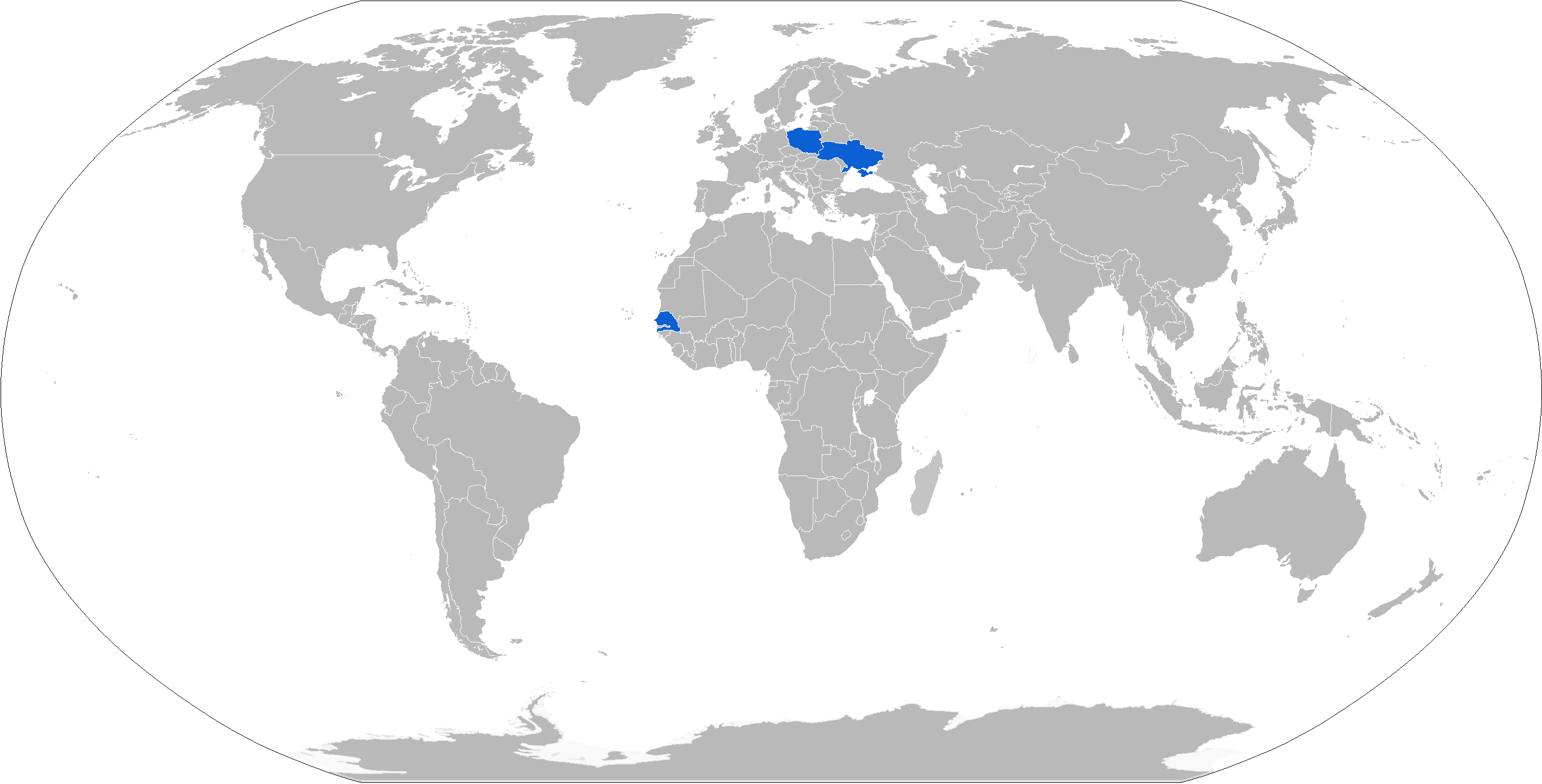
Map with Dozor-B operators in blue

- Poland - one "Dozor-B" prototype was sold to Poland. Produced under license by MISTA as the Oncilla.
- Senegal - at least two Oncilla armoured vehicles operated by Senegalese Army.
- Ukraine - on June 24, 2013 the Odesa military academy received the first "Dozor-B". Extra 200 "Dozor-B" were ordered for the Armed Forces of Ukraine in June 2014. A total of 10 Dozor-Bs were delivered to the Armed Forces of Ukraine before further orders were cancelled, and Polish Oncilla's were ordered instead. As of March 2023, Ukraine received at least 30 Oncillas. In February 2024, the 100th vehicle was delivered.

== See also ==
- VEPR
- Kozak (armored personnel carrier)
