= Mikhail Koshkin =

Soviet tank designer (1898–1940)

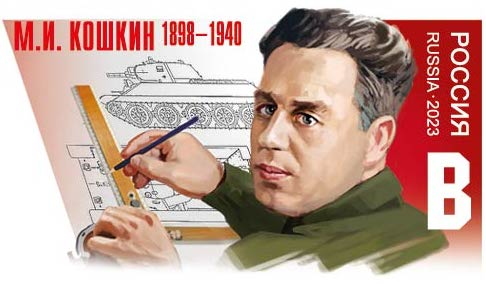
Koshkin on a 2023 stamp of Russia

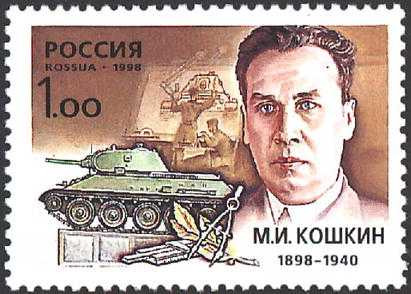
Koshkin on a 1998 stamp of Russia

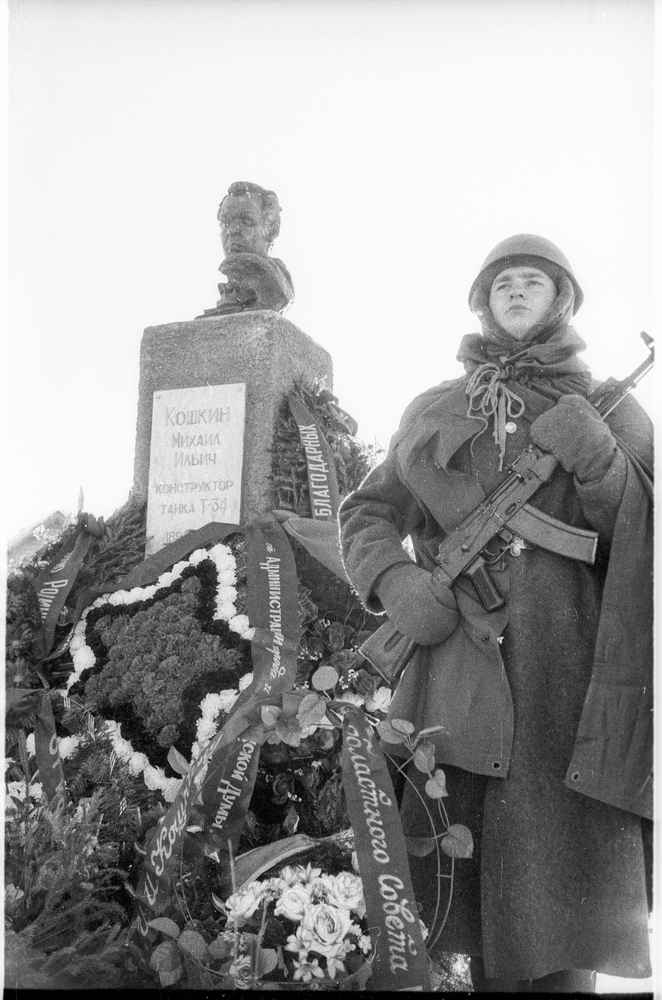
Bust with honor guard, Pereslavl.

Mikhail Ilyich Koshkin (Russian: Михаи́л Ильи́ч Ко́шкин; 3 December 1898, Brynchagi, Yaroslavl Oblast – 26 September 1940) was a Soviet tank designer, chief designer of the famous T-34 medium tank. The T-34 was the most produced tank of World War II. He started out in life as a confectioner, but then studied engineering.

In 1937, the Red Army assigned him to lead design bureau KB-190 to design a replacement for the BT tanks at the Kharkiv Komintern Locomotive Plant (KhPZ) in Kharkiv. Koshkin imagined the T-34 tank after BT tanks tested during the Spanish Civil War proved to be under-armored and prone to catching fire.

Koshkin claimed that he named the tank “T-34” because he began to imagine designs for the tank in 1934. After the Soviet Army rejected his prototype, Koshkin began privately assembling a testable prototype that he would work on in the evenings, after long days designing BT tank improvements.

He died from pneumonia he contracted during T-34 winter tests on 26 September 1940.

Mikhail Koshkin was posthumously awarded the State Stalin Prize in 1942 and the Order of the Red Star. In 1990, shortly before the final collapse of the USSR, he was posthumously decorated with the highest civilian honor, Hero of Socialist Labour.

== See also ==
- Kharkiv Morozov Machine Building Design Bureau
