= 4TP =

1930s Polish light tank prototype

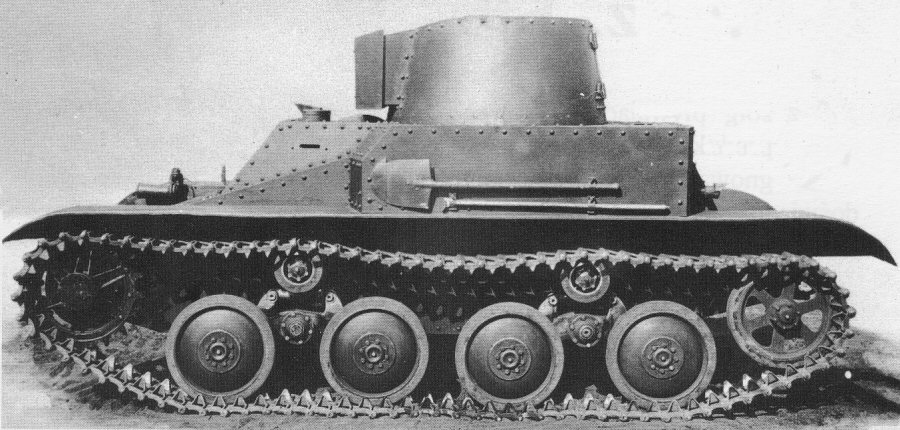
- Prototype with unarmed turret
- Type: Light tank
- Place of origin: Poland

Service history
- In service: 1937-1939 (prototype)

Production history
- No. built: 1 (prototype)

Specifications
- Crew: 2

4TP, otherwise known as PZInż 140, was a Polish light tank prototype. It was designed by 16 December 1936 by Edward Habich of the Państwowe Zakłady Inżynieryjne works. A light reconnaissance tank, it was to become a heavier replacement for TK-3 and TKS tankettes in Polish service. In addition to light, manoeuvrable chassis, the tank was to feature a turret with one nkm wz. 38 FK autocannon and one ckm wz. 30 machine gun.

Only a single prototype was built. Extensively tested by the army, it proved a reliable vehicle. However, the army decided that by the time serial production could start, the design would already be outdated, and no serial production followed.
