= Kharkiv Morozov Machine Building Design Bureau =

State-owned armored vehicle manufacturer in Ukraine

Morozov Machine Building Design Bureau
- Type: state enterprise
- Industry: Arms industry Automotive industry
- Founded: 1927
- Headquarters: Kharkiv, Ukraine
- Key people: Mikhail Koshkin, Alexander Morozov, notable chief designers
- Products: Military vehicles, main battle tanks, armored personnel carriers, tractors, heavy equipment, engines
- Owner: Ukrainian Defense Industry (company)
- Website: http://www.morozov.com.ua/

Kharkiv Morozov Machine Building Design Bureau (Ukrainian: Харківське Конструкторське Бюро з Машинобудування ім. О.О. Морозова, or ХКБМ, KhKBM, romanized: Kharkivske Konstruktorske Biuro z Mashynobuduvannia im. O.O. Morozova), often simply called Morozov Design Bureau or abbreviated KMDB, is a state-owned Ukrainian company in Kharkiv which designs armoured vehicles, including the T-80UD and T-84 main battle tanks, as well as military prime movers. It was responsible for designing and creating many important Soviet-era armoured fighting vehicles, including the BT tank series, with its most famous designs being the T-34, T-54, and T-64 tanks. It is closely associated with the Malyshev Factory.

== History ==
KMDB started as the Tank Design Team of the Kharkov Locomotive Factory Komintern (KhPZ, now Malyshev Factory) in 1927, in Kharkiv, Ukrainian Soviet Socialist Republic, and was responsible for the T-12 and T-24 light tanks. In the 1930s, the design team was designated as the independent T2K Tank Design Bureau, and began work on the BT tank series. In 1936 the plant was re-designated "Plant No. 183", and the design bureau "KB-190". The plant also produced small quantities of multi-turreted T-35 tanks, and had a separate design bureau (KB-35) to assist in their development.

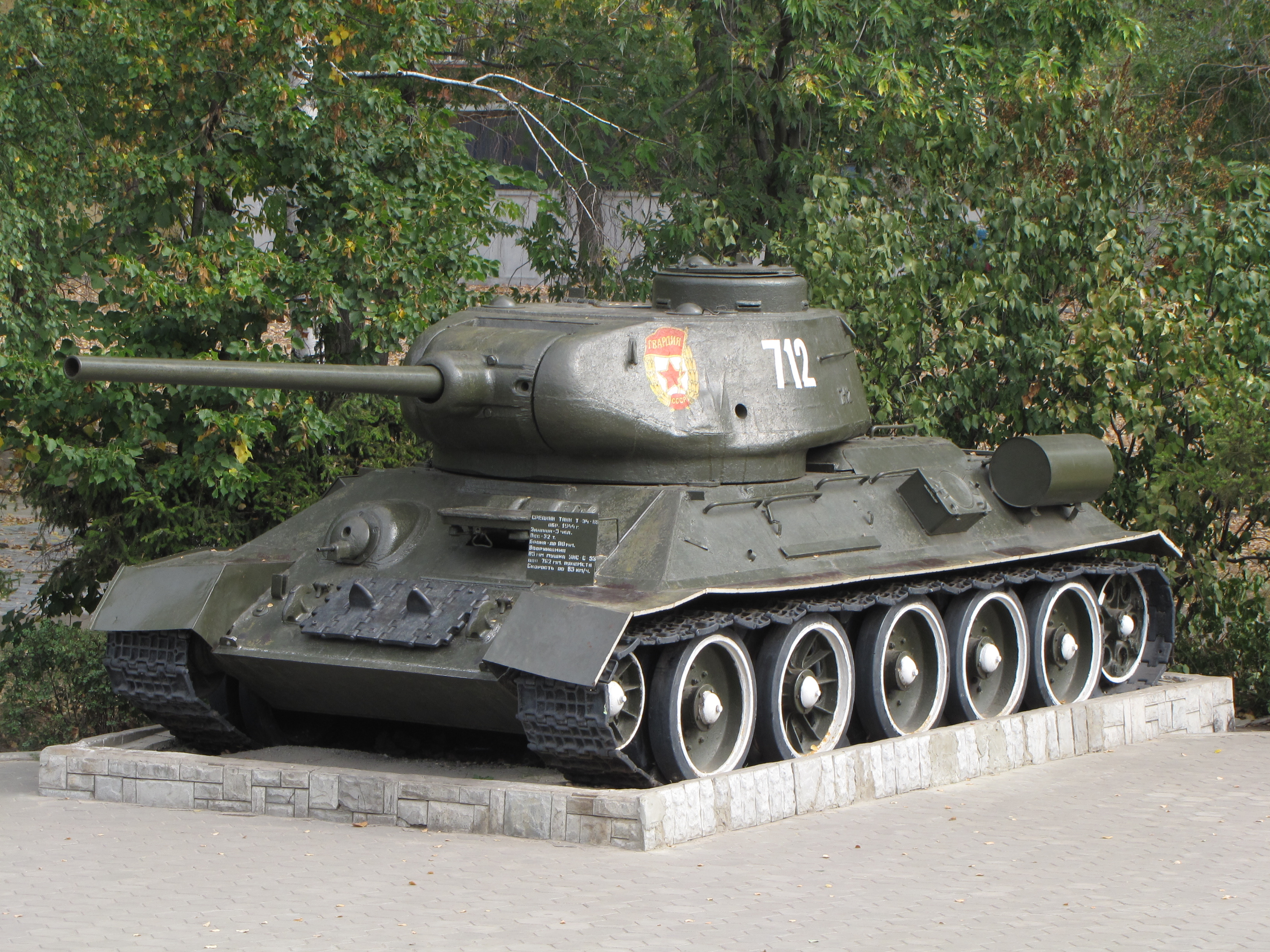
T-34-85 tank on display

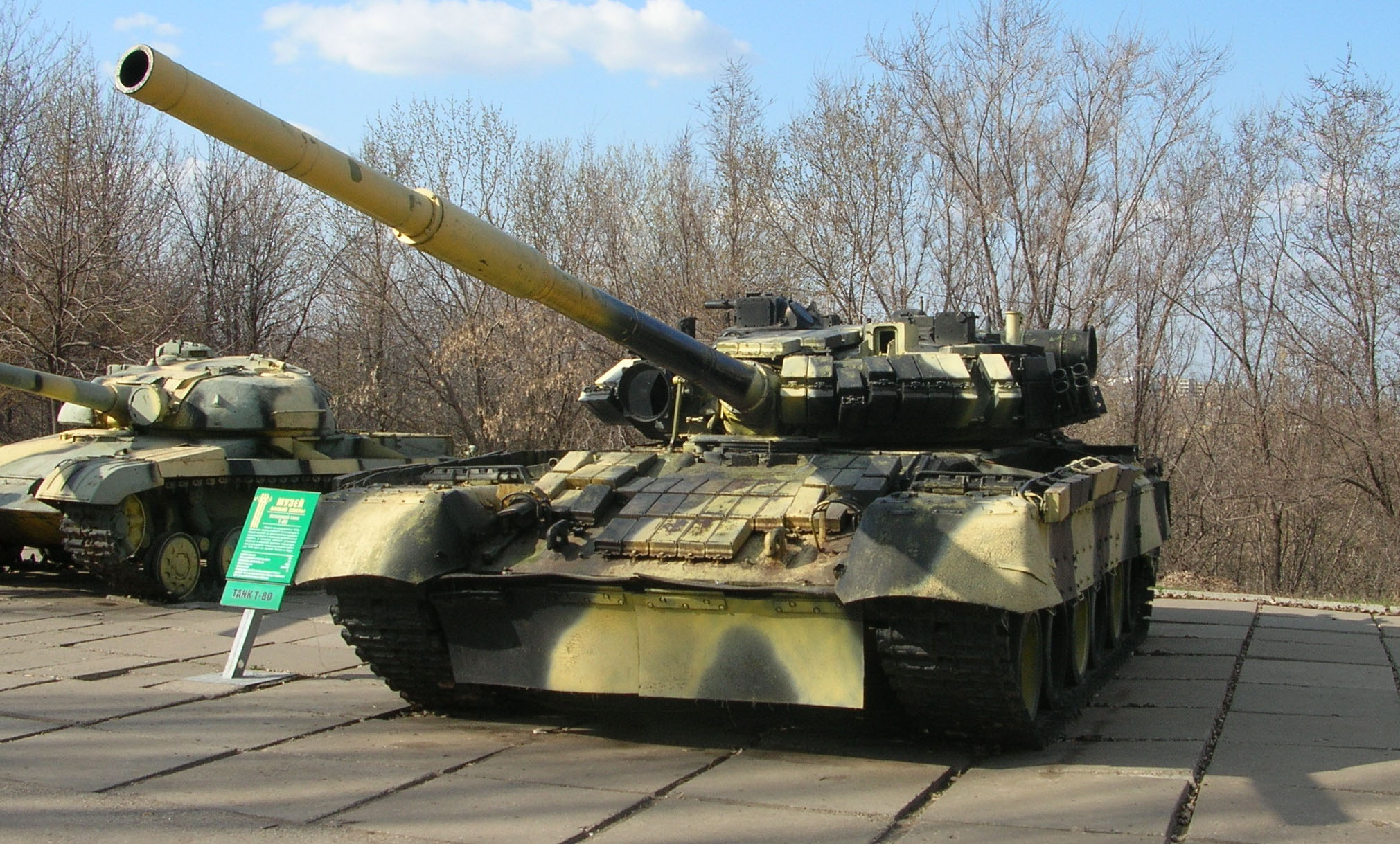
Soviet T-80 tank on display

In 1937, a separate design bureau was established to build a replacement for the BT tank series, under the supervision of Mikhail Koshkin. Koshkin pushed the boundaries of the specification given to him, and further development led to the T-34, the most-produced and one of the best known tanks of World War II. Series production began in June 1940 in Kharkiv, and followed by production at the Stalingrad Tractor Plant and the Sormovo Shipbuilding Plant in Gorky . In the same year, Koshkin died and Alexander Morozov was appointed Chief Designer of the T-34 Main Design Bureau (GKB T-34), a post he would hold for the remaining thirty-six years of his life.

In 1939, the tank design bureaux of Kharkov were merged into a single agency called Department 520. In 1941, due to German advances, the factory and design shops were evacuated to the Ural Mountains. The plant was combined with the Uralvagonzavod Plant in Nizhny Tagil into one enterprise called Urals Tank Plant No. 183.

Although design improvements and production continued to concentrate on the T-34 and improved T-34-85, new design work was also continued during the war. The T-44 began production in the recaptured Kharkov factory in 1945, and the first prototypes of the T-54 were built.

After the war was over, the factory gradually transferred operations back to Ukraine (now named "Kharkov Diesel Factory No. 75"). T-54 production was started in the Urals and Kharkiv in 1947–48, and the move ended with the 1951 establishment of the KB-60M Design Bureau in Kharkiv.

During the post-war period, Morozov turned over further development of the T-54/55 to the Leonid N. Kartsev Design Bureau at Uralvagonzavod, and began work on a next-generation main battle tank, which would become the T-64, for which Morozov would receive the Order of Lenin.

Factory No. 75, renamed Malyshev Plant in 1957, built tank engines, and later took up production of T-54, T-55 (1958, the most-produced tank ever), and T-64 (from 1967) tanks. The T-64 was also built in the Leningrad Kirov Plant and Uralvagonzavod Plant. In the 1960s the bureau also designed OT-54 and TO-55 flame-thrower tanks, for production at the Omsk Transport Machine Construction Plant.

In 1966, the tank design bureau (Department 60) and experimental tank production shop (Shop 190) were combined into the Kharkov Machine Building Design Bureau (KMDB). In 1979, after the death of Morozov, it was renamed in his honor.

KMDB designed the T-80UD, a diesel-engined variant of the gas turbine-powered T-80, in 1985.

== Production ==
=== Military products ===
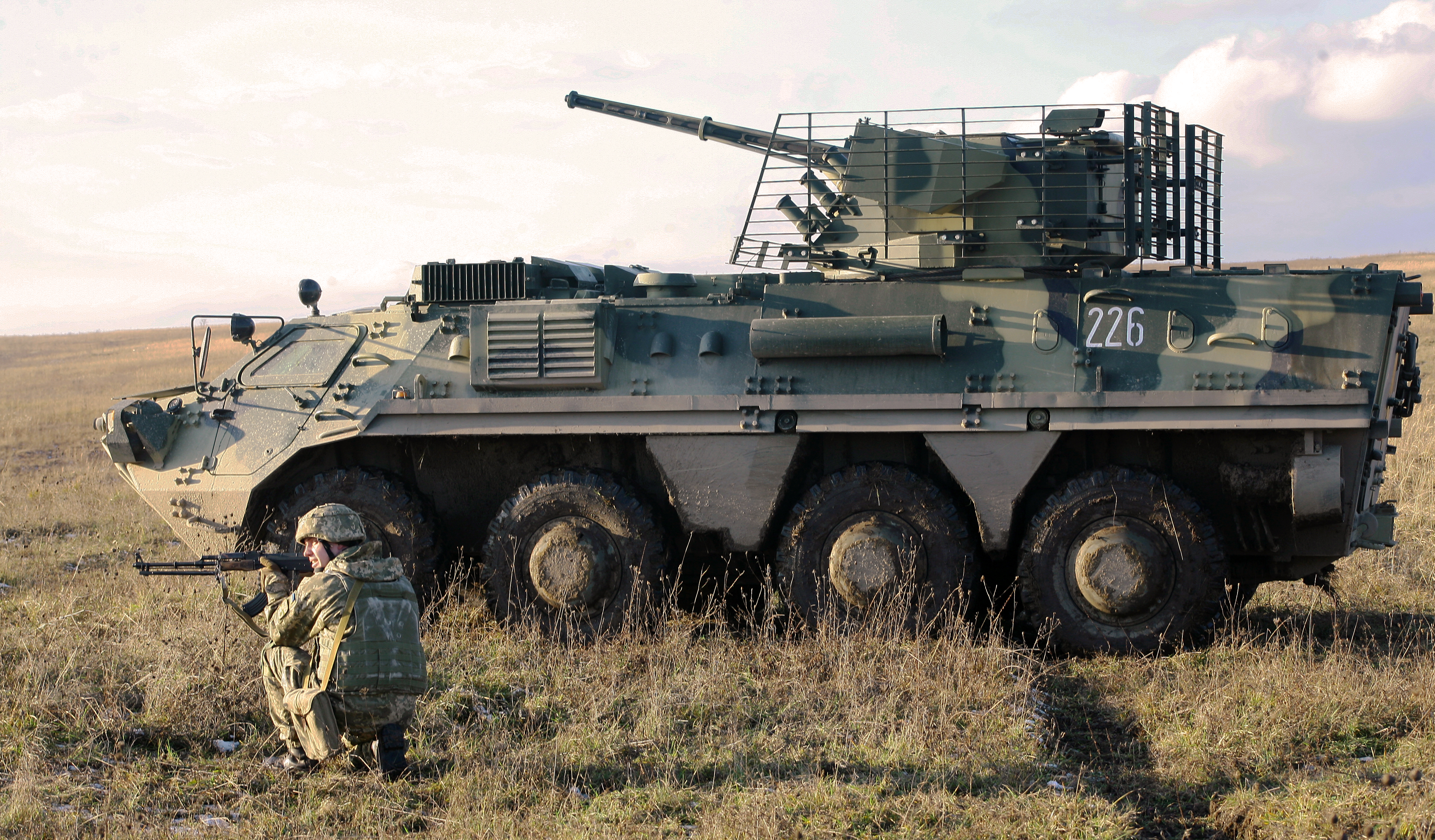
BTR-4 assigned to Ukrainian Armed Forces

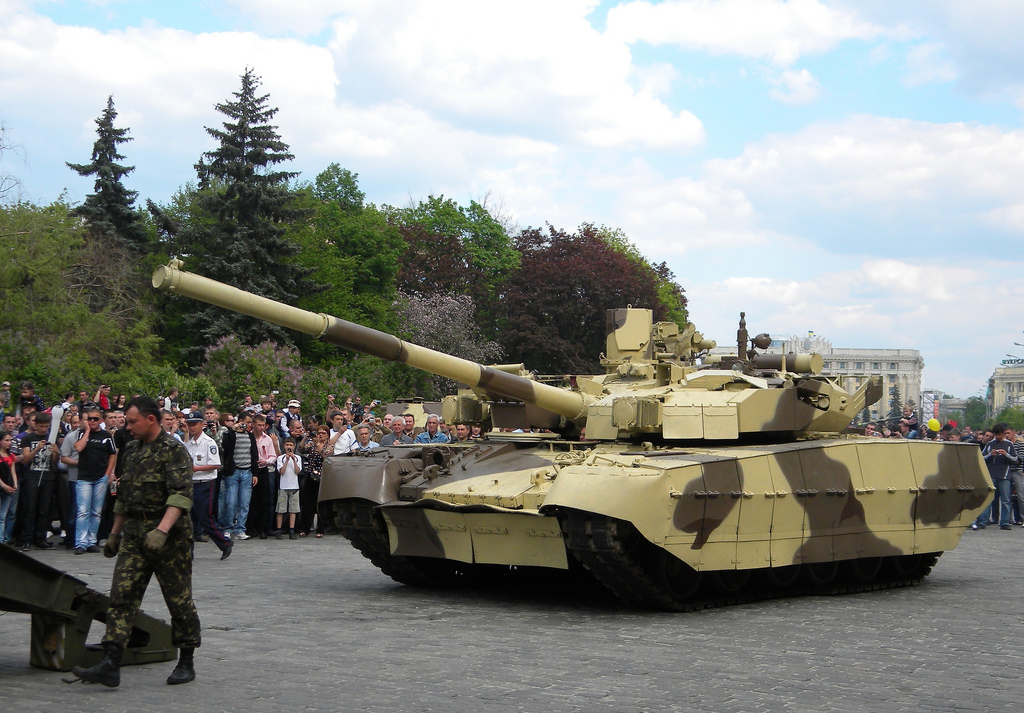
BM Oplot

After the break-up of the Soviet Union, KMDB and the Malyshev factory became the main tank design and manufacture enterprise in Ukraine. However, they were highly dependent on manufacture of components in Russian facilities, especially the Uralvagonzavod factory in Nizhny Tagil. In 1996, Ukraine and Pakistan signed a $650 million contract for delivery of 320 T-80UD tanks. Deliveries were hampered by politically motivated problems with supply of Russian components. Ukraine was forced to develop new manufacturing capabilities and the contract was concluded in 1999. KMDB then began supplying Pakistan with the 6TD-2 diesel engine for installation on the Al-Khalid main battle tank, and has assisted with Pakistan's Al-Zarrar tank project.

The T-84 entered service with the Military of Ukraine in 1999, and the more advanced Oplot version in 2001. The tank is actively marketed for export, and can incorporate Russian countermeasure systems and a French fire-control system. The T-84-120 and Yatagan has been developed employing an auto-loaded 120mm tank gun which fires NATO ammunition as well as anti-tank guided missiles. Versions have seen trials in Greece, Turkey, and Malaysia.

KMDB also produces military tractors, trainers and simulators, and upgrade packages for Soviet tanks and armoured personnel carriers. KMDB's BTR-4 armoured personnel carrier has been supplied to Iraq.

=== Armoured personnel carriers ===
- BTR-3U – developed in 2000/01 by a consortium comprising KMDB, State Scientific Technical Centre of Artillery & Rifle Arms (Ukraine) and ADCOM Manufacturing Company Ltd. of the United Arab Emirates.
- BTR-4 – further development after the BTR-3 with an improved hull and better protection
- Dozor-B – developed in 2005, used by Ukraine
- BMP-55 (AFV-55) – armored personnel carrier, converted from T-55, weighing 28,5 tons.

=== Main battle tanks ===
- T-80UD – supplied to Pakistan
- T-84 – variants include the Oplot, T-84-120 and the Yatagan

=== Diesel engines ===
- 6TD-1
- 6TD-2 – supplied to Pakistan for the Al-Khalid MBT

=== Civil products ===
- Dozor-A – high mobility vehicle developed in 2005, used by Ukraine
- UPG-92 – tracked self-propelled powder-type pulse-action fire-fighting vehicle is intended to suppress fires of A type (firm substances), B type (liquid substances), C type (gas-type substances) and fires
- KGS-25 – tracked crane
- BG-1 – tracked bulldozer
- MT-3 – small-size tractor
