= T-24 tank =

Soviet medium tank

T-24 Medium Tank
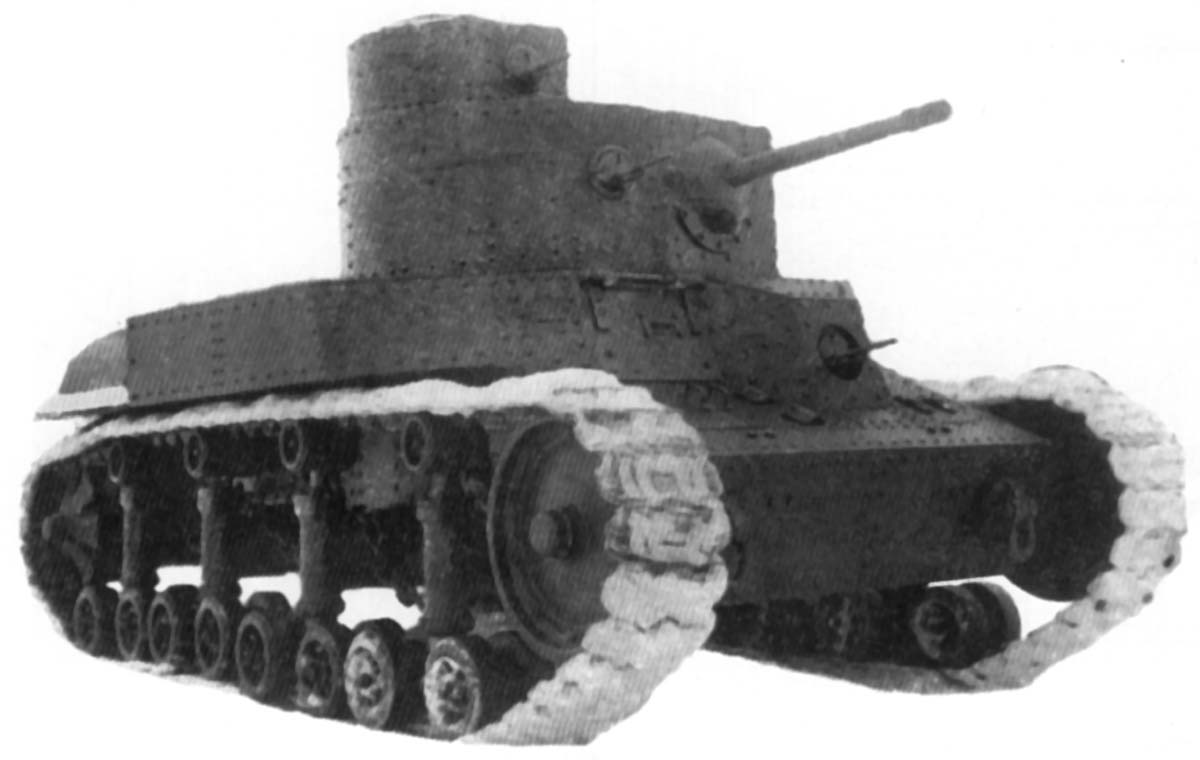
- Type: Medium tank
- Place of origin: Soviet Union

Service history
- Used by: Soviet Union

Production history
- Designer: Ivan N. Aleksenko, T2K design bureau
- Designed: 1930
- Manufacturer: KhPZ
- Produced: 1931
- No. built: 25
- Variants: T-12 tank prototype, Komintern & Voroshilovets artillery tractors

Specifications
- Mass: 18.5 tonnes
- Length: 6.50 m (21 ft 4 in)
- Width: 3.00 m (9 ft 10 in)
- Height: 2.81 m (9 ft 3 in)
- Crew: 5
- Armour: 8–20 mm
- Main armament: 45 mm gun Model 32
- Secondary armament: 3 × DT machine gun
- Engine: 250 hp (190 kW)
- Power/weight: 13.5 hp/tonne
- Suspension: vertical spring
- Operational range: 140 km
- Maximum speed: 25 km/h (16 mph)

The T-24 was a Soviet medium tank built in 1931. Only twenty-four were built, and none saw combat. This was the first tank produced at the KhPZ factory in Kharkov, which was later responsible for the very successful BT series, T-34 and T-54 Soviet tanks. The T-24's suspension was used successfully in the Soviet Union's first purpose-built artillery tractors.

The T-24's main armament was a 45 mm gun. It had a ball-mount 7.62 mm DT machine gun in the hull, another in the turret, and a third in a secondary turret atop the main turret. The tank was well-armoured for its time, but the engine and transmission had problems.

== Production history ==
A tank design bureau was established at the Kharkov Locomotive Factory (KhPZ) in Kharkov, Soviet Ukraine, in 1928. The first tank project of the factory was the T-12 (or T-1-12). This was a larger version of the T-18, with a more powerful engine (the T-18 was based on the Renault FT). The idea of the T-24 tank was so great, in August 1930, the Revolutionary Military Council (RVS) commissioned a staggering 1,600 T-24 tanks, compared to worldwide production being 900 tanks during these years.

The T-24 was commissioned as an effort to recover the engineering that was placed into the T-12 tank. The demise of the T-24 was caused by factors that were overlooked to compensate for the oversight of the T-12, this caused the T-24 to be plagued with faults that were seen as basic. This included mechanical errors within the drive train and the suspension. After twenty five T-24 tanks had been built, the entire project was cancelled. One prototype was built and production of thirty tanks in 1930 was authorized, but automotive performance was so disappointing that it was decided to do further development work. In total, twenty five tanks were built. Eventually, the tanks that remained were used as training tank units of the Red Army.

The project was re-designated T-24, work was completed fixing problems with the transmission and fuel system, and a larger turret was designed. Initial trials were conducted, during which performance was found satisfactory, although the prototype's engine caught fire, and the turret had to be transferred to a T-12 prototype for further testing. Only a total of twenty-four were built during 1931. The T-24s were originally armed only with machine guns, until the 45 mm guns were installed in the following year.

The T-24 was found unreliable and was used only for training and parades. Although the T-24 tank was a failure, it gave the KhPZ its initial tank design and production experience, which was applied much more successfully in adopting production of the US Christie tank as the BT tank series, starting in 1931.

The T-24 ultimately was cancelled midway through production because of where it stood in the lineup of Soviet tanks that already existed at the time. The T-24 was meant to cover the gap in the existing lineup that consisted of light and heavy tanks by introducing the mechanics of a medium tank. During the design process of the T-24, the Soviets focused on many outlets for a solution to their problem, including the T-19, T-21, and T-23 tanks. While undergoing testing however, the T-24 was competing with the more widely known Tank Grotte-1, otherwise known as the TG-1 and eventually dubbed the T-22 by the Soviets.

=== Artillery tractors ===
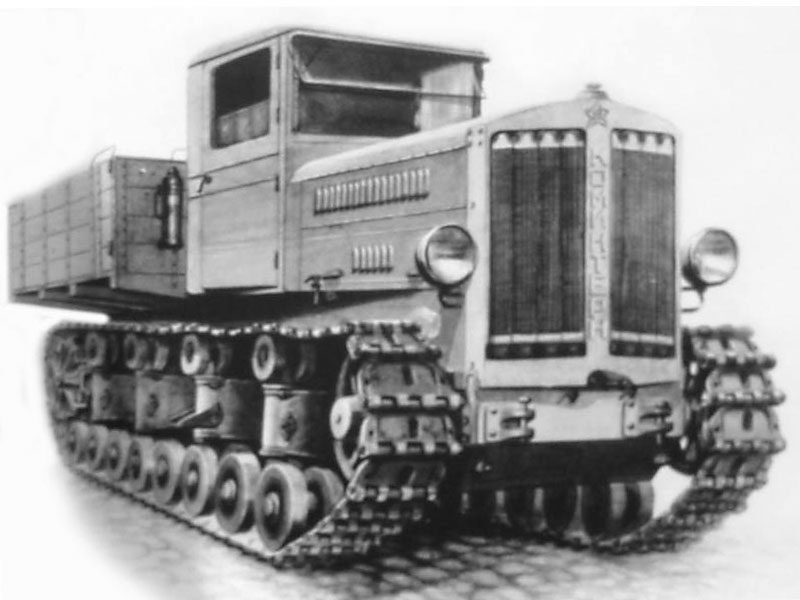
Komintern artillery tractor

The KhPZ's Komintern artillery tractor was based on the suspension of the T-12 tank (50 built from 1930) and later the T-24 (2,000 built from 1935 to 1941), powered by a 131-hp diesel engine. Unlike its predecessor tanks, the tractor was more successful and was put into mass production. The Komintern inherited several of the T-24's disadvantages (like the slow mobility), but some of them were fixed by designers, others were not as significant for tractor as for a tank. The Komintern was used to tow medium artillery such as the 152 mm gun-howitzer.

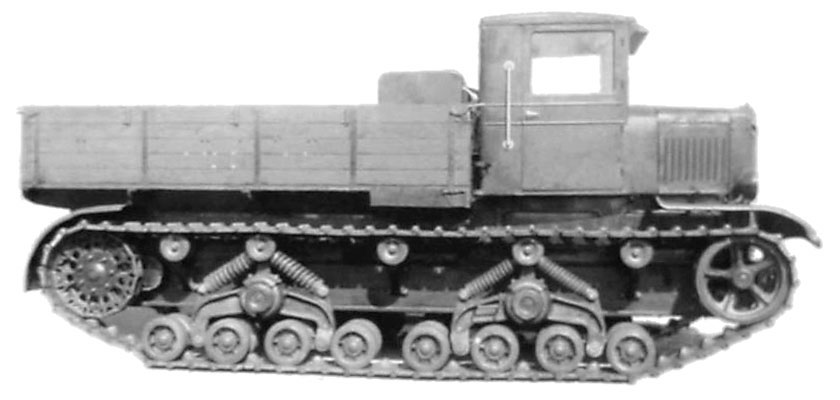
Voroshilovets heavy artillery tractor

The Voroshilovets heavy artillery tractor was also based on the T-24's suspension, using the same but detuned Model V-2 diesel engine as the BT-7M and T-34 tanks. About 230 were built at KhPZ from 1939, and after the German invasion of 1941 production was shifted to the Stalingrad Tractor Factory until August 1942.

== Design process ==
Searching for a heavily armored tank in the “medium tank” category, the Soviets established a committee dubbed the “Tank Design Bureau” at the Kharkov Locomotive Factory. The committee started with drafts of a large version of the T-18, this was the original T-12. The T-12 would have a more powerful 200 horsepower engine, and larger guns. The committee initially created 30 T-12s with their budget allocation in 1930. The prototypes of the T-12 was summed up as a flawed design, and it was decided a new design would be drafted all together.

Eventually, the project was re-designated as the T-24, which sported many changes, including a greater intricacy of the engineering. The initial changes resolved around fixing problems with the transmission and fuel system, which created an opportunity to have a large turret. The hull was widened which provided more space, and the turrets were now rounded, instead of an octagon. The T-24 also provided more armor in certain areas.

Between 1930 and 1931, the improvements the T-24 had made upon the T-12 were promising, where 300 more tanks than the initial 30 were planned. However, during testing of the initial 25 produced, problems that questioned the reliability of the T-24 arose once more. The T-24 was removed from production due not only to its flaws, but also the complexity of manufacturing.

== Specifications ==
=== Size ===
The T-24 had a chassis that was 5.68 meters long, 2.8 meters wide, and 3 meters tall. This allowed for a crew size of around 5. Compared to American WWII tanks of the time, the T-24 shares almost exactly the same dimensions as the M4 Sherman tank, while being larger than the infamous American M18 Hellcat.

=== Engine ===
The T-24 tank had a single M-6 8 cylinder engine. The engine ran on gasoline and developed between 250 and 300 horsepower. This configuration of the engine allowed the tank to have a max speed of 25 kilometers per hour (16 miles-per-hour). The T-24 tank sported a fuel tank large enough to go 120 kilometers (75 miles).

=== Armament ===
The T-24 tank had a single 45 mm Model 32 gun in the main turret. The T-24 also sported 3 7.62mm DT machine guns, placed around the coaxial mounting in the main turret, in the front left bow area to provide flexibility in targeting, and lastly, in an independently-operated turret above the main turret.
