= VEPR =

- Type: Armoured personnel carrier
- Place of origin: Ukraine

Service history
- In service: 2006

Production history
- Designer: Kremenchuk Automobile Assembly Plant
- Designed: 2002
- Manufacturer: Kremenchuk Automobile Assembly Plant
- Unit cost: $50,000–250,000
- Variants: Hunter, Commander, C

Specifications
- Mass: 3.56 t and up depending on the armour
- Length: 5.3 m
- Width: 2.5 m
- Height: 2.1 m
- Crew: 5-9
- Armor: 10 mm. D6, D7 class
- Engine: 4-cylinder 3.9-liter diesel
- Payload capacity: 2 t
- Drive: 4x4, 18–20-inch wheels
- Transmission: Iveco manual
- Suspension: independent
- Ground clearance: 300–600 mm, adjustable
- Operational range: Fuel consumption per 100 km: city: 14 L highway: 11.5 L
- Maximum speed: 140 km/h

VEPR (Ukrainian: Автомобіль Високо-Ефективної ПРохідності (Avtomobil Vysoko-Efektyvnoyi PRokhidnosti, Вепр, wild boar) is a Ukrainian multi-purpose off-road vehicle designed and assembled by the Kremenchuk Automobile Assembly Plant (KrASZ).

The designers' goal was to create an SUV-type vehicle which would have the same terrain ability traditionally reserved for larger cargo vehicles, such as the KrAZ and Ural. The patent has been received for the passenger-cargo vehicle.

The per-unit price of the VEPR is estimated to be between $50,000 and $250,000.

== Description ==
Fuel consumption is said to be modest for a vehicle of this size, with 14 liters per 100 km in urban areas, and 11.5 liters per 100 km on highways. This makes the VEPR more fuel-efficient than the smaller Hummer.

Standard modification includes:

- Adjustable pressure tires for use on all terrains
- A/C and heat independent of the engine
- Drum brakes of closed type, for harsh temperatures and driving over ford crossings, can clear up to 1.5 meter water level
- Stainless steel frame and parts
- BTR-94 wheels

== Variants ==
- VEPR-K "Commander" (ВЕПР-К «Командир»)

- military armored variant
- extreme off-road, civilian unarmored variant. It is said to be targeted at the American Hummer SUV. photo

- VEPR-K "Sport" (ВЕПР-К «Спорт») - unarmored rally car, at least one was made in 2013 photo
- VEPR-M "Hunter" (ВЕПР-М «Мисливець») - Fully enclosed unarmored cab-forward truck photo
- VEPR-S "Special" (ВЕПР-С «Спеціальний») - fully enclosed cab-forward multi-purpose armored vehicle with «Кольчуга» passive sensor or «Мандат-Б1Е» electronic countermeasure system. Only 15 were made. Not produced since May 2011 photo

== Production ==
At least 10 vehicles have been produced for the Siberian Tyumen and Yakutiya regions, Kazakhstan, and Kyrgyzstan until 15 March 2006.

== Operators ==
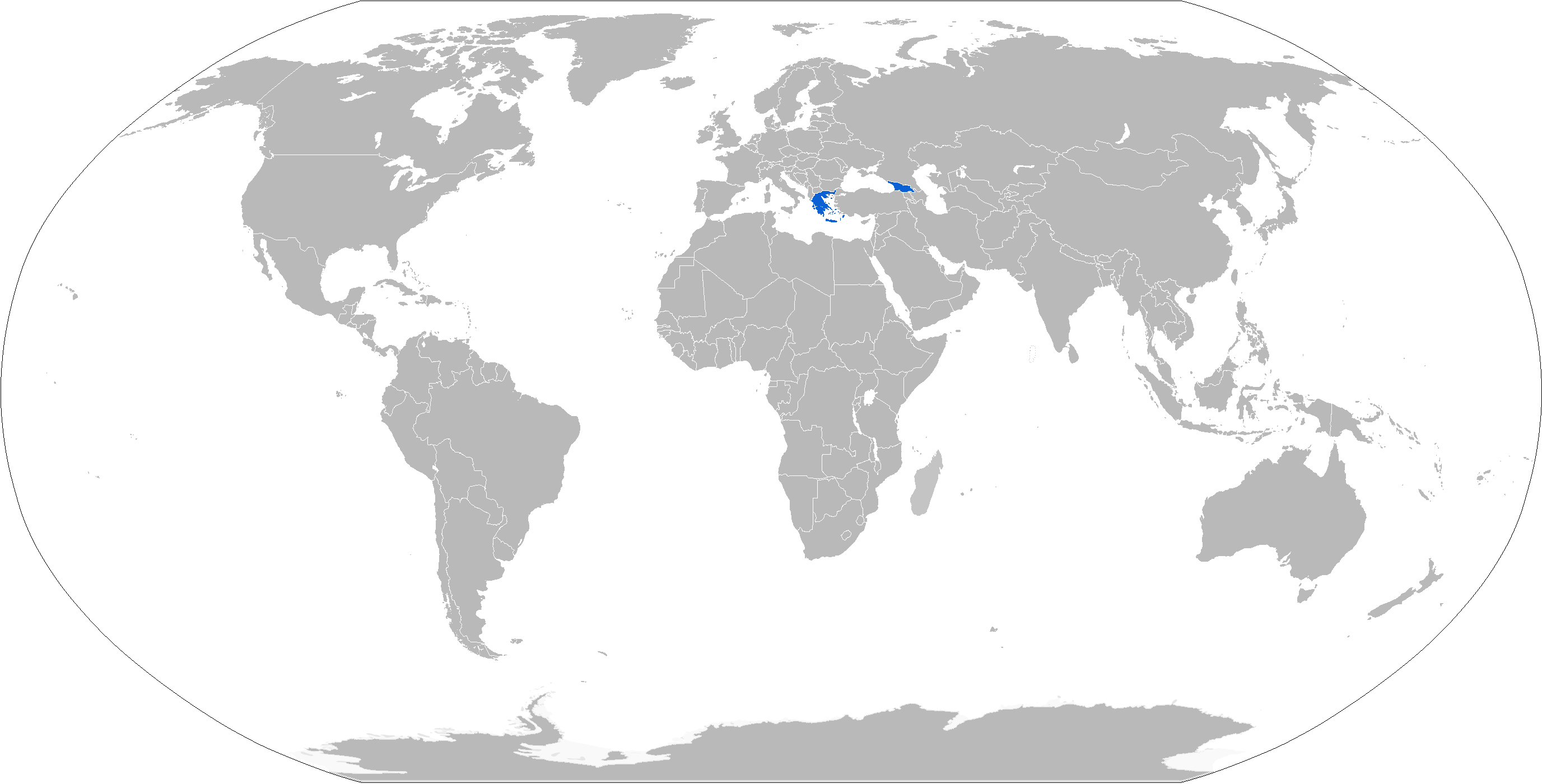
Map of VEPR operators in blue

=== Current operators ===
- Georgia - 1 VEPR-S "Special" since May 2008
- Greece - 1 VEPR-S "Special" since May 2008
