= Ihor Voronchenko =

Ukrainian admiral

- Ігор Олександрович Воронченко
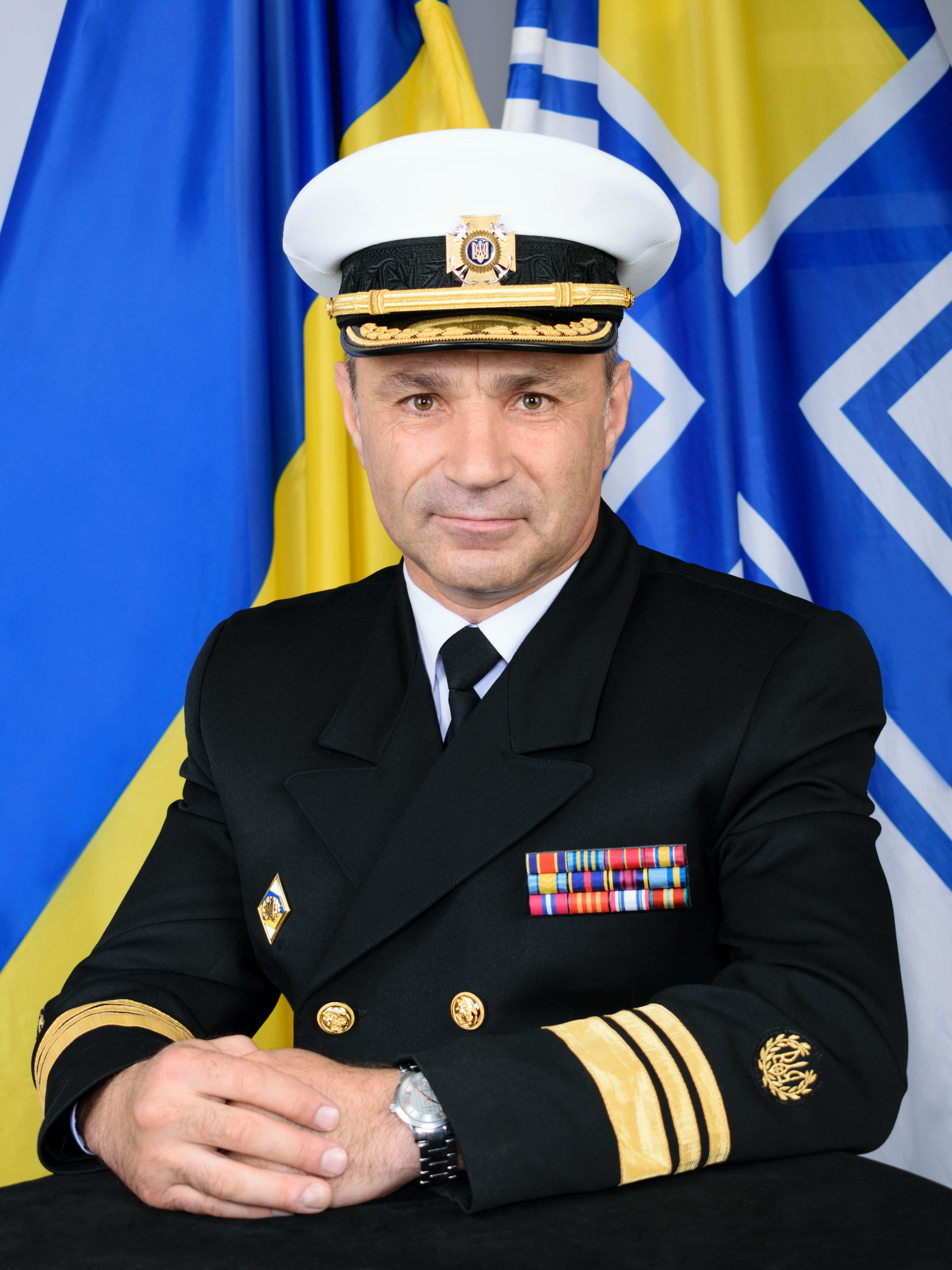
- Voronchenko in 2017
- Born: 22 August 1964 (age 62); Babai, Kharkiv Raion, Ukrainian SSR, Soviet Union
- Military career
- Allegiance: USSR; Ukraine
- Branch: Ukrainian Ground Forces; Ukrainian Navy
- Service years: 1980s–2020
- Rank: Admiral (2018)
- Commands: Commander of the Ukrainian Navy (2016–2020); Chief of the Main administration of personnel (2015–2016); Chief of the Coastal Defense Administration (2013–2015); 25th Regiment/501st Separate Mechanized Regiment (1998–2003)

Ihor Oleksandrovych Voronchenko (Ukrainian: Ігор Олександрович Воронченко; born 22 August 1964) is a Ukrainian admiral and a former commander of the Ukrainian Navy.

Before becoming commander of the Ukrainian Navy, Voronchenko held the staff position in General Staff, the position of chief of the Coastal Defense Administration (Ukrainian Navy), and was a commander of a former National Guard of Ukraine regiment that was later transformed into a battalion of Marine Infantry. Voronchenko served in Crimea starting in 1998.

== Career ==
Voronchenko was born 22 August 1964 in the village of Babai in Kharkiv Raion.

After graduation from the Tashkent Higher Tank Command School Voronchenko was assigned to East-Germany where he was commander of a tank platoon until 1988. Voronchenko then became a commander of a tank company in the Belarusian Military District. After the collapse of the Soviet Union he returned to Ukraine and continued service in the National Guard of Ukraine in Kharkiv. Then he graduated from the Academy of the Armed Forces of Ukraine. Starting in 1998, he served in Crimea on the post of commander of a National Guard regiment. And then became Crimea's chief of the Coastal Defense Administration of the Ukrainian Navy.

During the February/March 2014 Russian annexation of Crimea Voronchenko was captured and detained for 4 days in Crimea before being released on 27 March 2014.

Voronchenko was appointed acting commander of the Ukrainian Navy on 25 April 2016. And on 3 July 2016 President Petro Poroshenko appointed him as commander of the Ukrainian Navy. The same day Voronchenko was conferred the rank of Vice Admiral (on 25 April 2016 he held the rank of Lieutenant General). On 23 August 2018 he was promoted to the rank of Admiral. On 11 June 2020 President Volodymyr Zelenskyy appointed Oleksiy Neizhpapa as commander of the Ukrainian Navy.

Military offices
Preceded by Serhiy Hayduk	Naval Commander of Ukraine; 2016–2020	Succeeded by Oleksiy Neizhpapa
