= Mykhailo Yezhel =

Ukrainian admiral

- Михайло Єжель
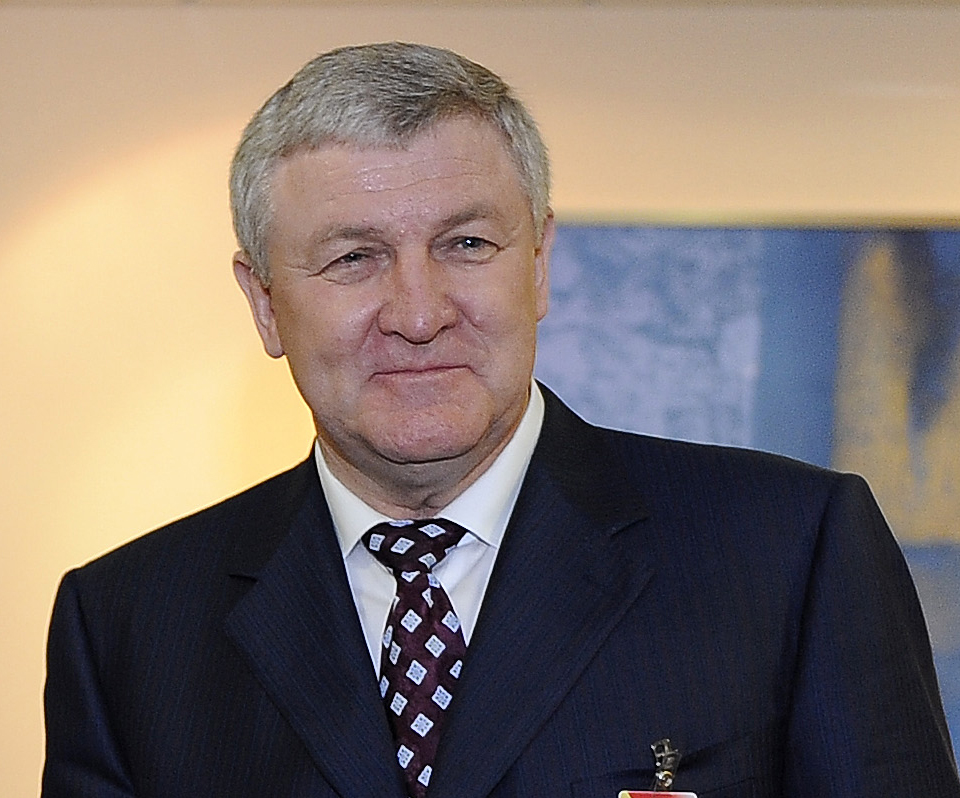
- Yezhel in 2010

Ambassador to Belarus
- In office 3 April 2013 – 11 May 2015
- Preceded by: Viktor Tykhonov
- Succeeded by: Ihor Kyzym

Minister of Defense
- In office 11 March 2010 – 8 February 2012
- Preceded by: Valeriy Ivashchenko (acting)
- Succeeded by: Dmytro Salamatin

Commander-in-Chief of the Ukrainian Navy
- In office 28 October 1996 – 20 May 2003
- Preceded by: Volodymyr Bezkorovainy (acting)
- Succeeded by: Ihor Knyaz

Personal details
- Born: Mykhailo Bronislavovych Yezhel; 19 October 1952 (age 73) Sloboda-Yaltushkivska, Bar Raion, Vinnytsya Oblast, Ukrainian SSR, Soviet Union

Military service
- Allegiance: Soviet Union; Ukraine
- Branch/service: Soviet Navy; Ukrainian Navy
- Years of service: 1970–2003
- Rank: Admiral

Admiral Mykhailo Bronislavovych Yezhel (Ukrainian: Михайло Броніславович Єжель; born 19 October 1952) is a Ukrainian politician, diplomat, and former naval officer who last served as an ambassador to Belarus from 2013 to 2015. He had been the Minister of Defence of Ukraine from 2010 to 2012, as he was the former Commander of the Ukrainian Navy from 1996 to 2003.

== Biography ==
Yezhel was born on 19 October 1952 in a small village of Sloboda-Yaltushkivska, Bar Raion, Vinnytsia Oblast, in the Ukrainian SSR of the Soviet Union.

In 1970 he completed 10th grade in a Republican specialized boarding school in Kyiv and went on military career. Having served in the Pacific Fleet of the Soviet Navy from 1975 till 1993, Yezhel acquired citizenship of the newly independent Ukraine and joined its Navy from the very beginning of its foundation.

From 20 August 2001 until 25 April 2003, he served as commander-in-chief of the Ukrainian Navy. He retired in October 2003.

From 11 March 2010 until 8 February 2012 he served as the Minister of Defence of Ukraine. According to Ukrayinska Pravda he had been forced to resign "for failure to plan for army reform". On 24 February 2012 Yezhel was appointed an adviser to Ukrainian President Viktor Yanukovych.

From 2013 until 2015 Yezhel was Ambassador of Ukraine to Belarus.

In March 2016 Mykhailo Yezhel together with (his successor as Minister of Defence) Pavlo Lebedyev were placed on a wanted list by Ukrainian authorities on suspicion of criminal activities and desertion. Yezhel was specifically wanted in relation to the sale of two Tu-95MS bombers to Russia during his period as defense minister. In April 2015 Belarus refused to respond to the Ukrainian request as to whether Yezhel lived in Minsk. Yezhel than confirmed that he and his family did live in Belarus, and that he will only return to Ukraine after a withdrawal of the criminal charges. He was granted refugee status in Belarus in July 2018.

Military offices
Preceded by Volodymyr Bezkorovainy	Naval Commander of Ukraine; 2001–2003	Succeeded by Ihor Knyaz
