= Commander of the Navy (Ukraine) =

Ukrainian naval rank

Commander of the Ukrainian Navy
- Командувач Військово-Морських Сил ЗС України
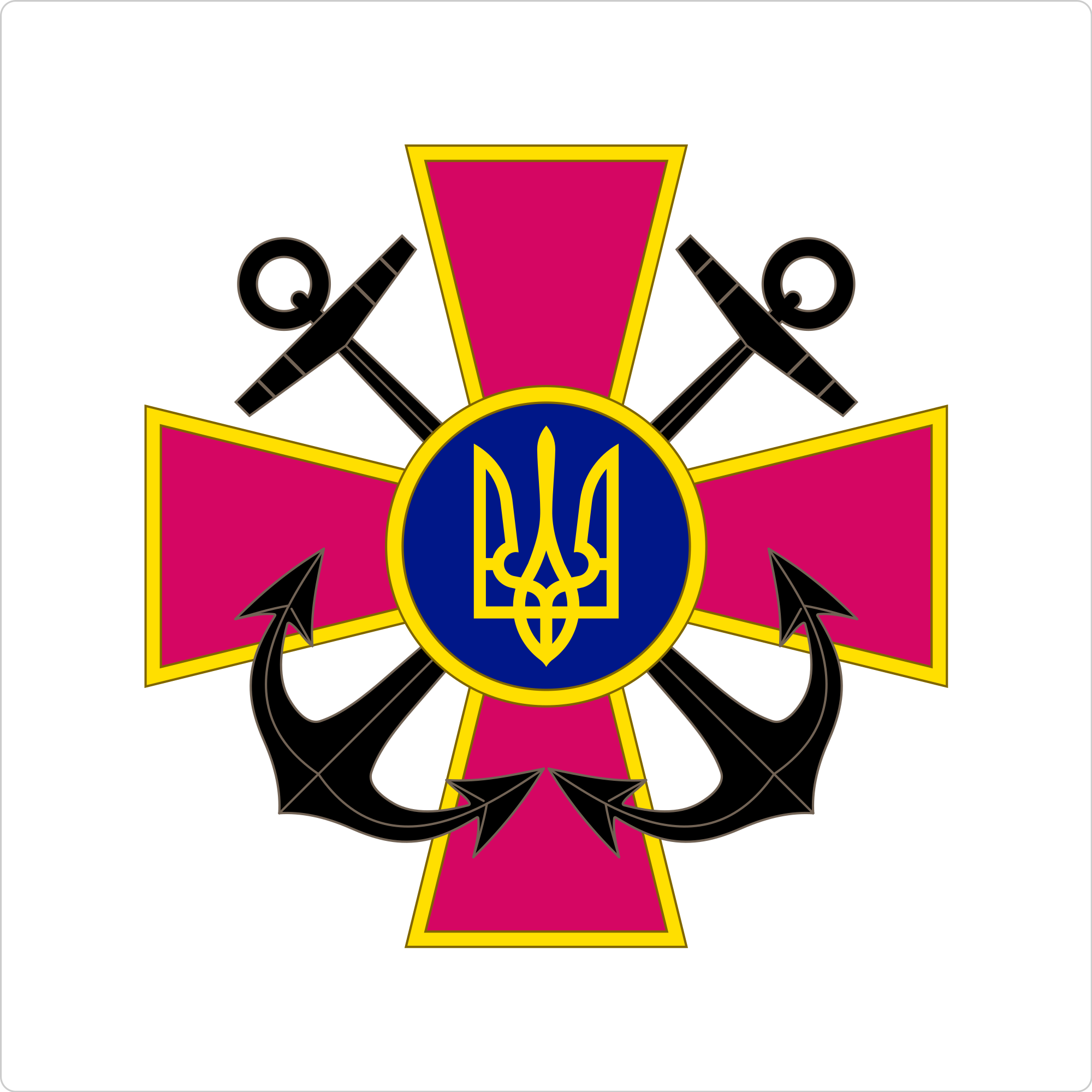
- Ensign of the Commander

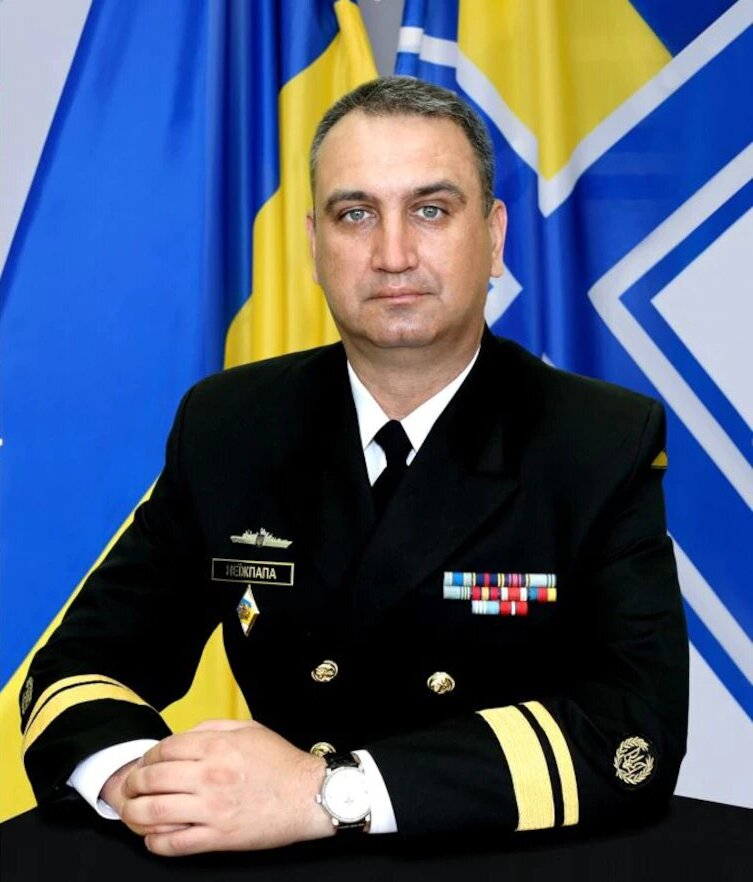
- Incumbent; Oleksiy Neizhpapa since 11 June 2020
- Ukrainian Navy
- Member of: General Staff of the Armed Forces of Ukraine
- Reports to: Commander-in-Chief of the Armed Forces
- Appointer: The president
- Formation: April 1992
- First holder: Boris Kozhin

The commander of the Ukrainian Navy (Ukrainian: Командувач Військово-Морських Сил) is the professional head of the Ukrainian Navy.

== List of commanders ==
No.	Picture	Commander	Took office	Left office	Time in office	Ref.
1	Boris Kozhin	Vice admiral Boris Kozhin (born 1944)	April 1992	October 1993	1 year, 6 months	.
2	Volodymyr Bezkorovainy	Vice admiral Volodymyr Bezkorovainy (1944–2017)	October 1993	October 1996	3 years	.
3	Mykhailo Yezhel	Vice admiral Mykhailo Yezhel (born 1952)	October 1996	May 2003	6 years, 7 months	.
4	Ihor Knyaz [uk]	Vice admiral Ihor Knyaz (born 1955)	May 2003	March 2006	2 years, 10 months	.
5	Ihor Tenyukh	Admiral; Ihor Tenyukh (born 1958)	March 2006	March 2010	4 years	.
6	Viktor Maksymov [uk]	Admiral; Viktor Maksymov (born 1951)	March 2010	June 2012	2 years, 3 months	.
7	Yuriy Ilyin	Admiral; Yuriy Ilyin (born 1962)	July 2012	19 February 2014	1 year, 7 months	
8	Denis Berezovsky	Counter admiral Denis Berezovsky (born 1974)	1 March 2014	2 March 2014	0 months	
–	Serhiy Hayduk	Vice admiral Serhiy Hayduk (born 1963); Acting	2 March 2014	7 March 2014	1 month	
9	Serhiy Hayduk	Vice admiral Serhiy Hayduk (born 1963)	7 March 2014	15 April 2016	2 years, 1 month	
–	Ihor Voronchenko	Vice admiral Ihor Voronchenko (born 1963); Acting	25 April 2016	3 July 2016	2 months	
10	Ihor Voronchenko	Admiral; Ihor Voronchenko (born 1963)	3 July 2016	11 June 2020	3 years, 11 months	
11	Oleksiy Neizhpapa	Vice admiral Oleksiy Neizhpapa (born 1975)	11 June 2020	Incumbent	6 years, 2 months	

== See also ==
- Admiral (Ukraine)
- Commander of the Ground Forces (Ukraine)
- Commander of the Air Force (Ukraine)
- Commander of the Air Defence Forces (Ukraine)
- Commander of the Air Assault Forces (Ukraine)
- Commander of the Marine Corps (Ukraine)
