= Volodymyr Bezkorovainy =

Ukrainian Navy officer (1944–2017)

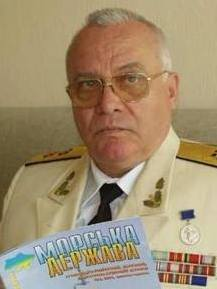
- Native name: Безкоровайний Володимир Герасимович
- Born: 16 August 1944; Uman, Cherkasy Oblast, Ukrainian SSR, Soviet Union
- Died: 23 January 2017 (aged 72) Kyiv, Ukraine
- Allegiance: Ukraine
- Branch: Ukrainian Navy
- Rank: Vice Admiral
- Commands: Commander of the Ukrainian Navy

Admiral Volodymyr Herasymovych Bezkorovainy (Ukrainian: Володимир Герасимович Безкоровайний); August 16, 1944 – January 23, 2017) was a Ukrainian naval officer who served as the Commander of the Ukrainian Navy from 1993 to 1996.

Military offices
Preceded by Boris Kozhin	Naval Commander of Ukraine; 1993–1996	Succeeded by Mykhailo Yezhel
