= Boris Kozhin =

Ukrainian retired vice admiral and politician

Boris Kozhyn
- Борис Кожин
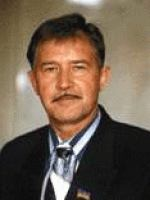
- Kozhyn's official portrait, 1998

People's Deputy of Ukraine
- In office 12 May 1998 – 14 May 2002
- Constituency: People's Movement of Ukraine, No. 12

Personal details
- Born: 25 October 1944 (age 81) Pskov, Pskov Oblast, Russian SFSR, Soviet Union (now Russia)
- Party: People's Movement of Ukraine
- Education: Saint Petersburg Naval Institute; Kuznetsov Naval Academy

Military service
- Allegiance: Soviet Union; Ukraine
- Branch/service: Soviet Union; Ukrainian Navy
- Years of service: 1968–2002
- Rank: Vice Admiral (1993); Counter admiral (1987); Captain of 2nd rank (1980)
- Commands: Ukrainian Navy (1992–1993); Crimean Naval Base (1992); OVR brigade (1980–1986)

Boris Borisovich Kozhin or Borys Borysovych Kozhyn (Ukrainian: Борис Борисович Кожин; born 25 October 1944, Pskov, Russia) is a Ukrainian retired vice admiral and politician who served as the first commander of the Ukrainian Navy from April 1992 to October 1993. He later served as a People's Deputy of Ukraine on the party list of the People's Movement of Ukraine from 1998 to 2002.

== Biography ==
Borys Kozhyn was born in Pskov in 1944 in a family of the World War II veteran who was repressed in 1947 and convicted for 25 years, but in 1956 rehabilitated. In 1959 Kozhyn family moved to Lutsk where the relatives of Borys Kozhyn's mother lived. Borys' mother herself is from a small of Pidhaitsi (within the historical region of Galicia).

Upon finishing school in 1961 Kozhyn worked as a mechanic at the Lutsk vehicle maintenance factory. In 1963, he became a champion of Volyn, a vice-champion of Ukraine in cycling and won a bronze medal of the Spartakiad of Peoples of the USSR in road bicycle racing, competition for which in the framework of the spartakiad was taking place in Ternopil.

In 1968 Kozhyn graduated the Frunze Higher Naval School in Leningrad with specialty "Antisubmarine armament" as an electrical engineer. Upon graduation (August 1968 - November 1971) he was placed as a commander assistant and commander of an anti-submarine boat PR-201 (predecessor of Poti-class corvette) (Note: some sources claim that Kozhyn was assigned to MPK-5, yet in 1968 that ship was just built and was not assigned to any fleet until 1970.) (military unit 99724) that was part of the Black Sea Fleet division of ships carrying out security of water district (Russian: дивизия кораблей ОВР, divizia korablei OVR) in Sevastopol. During that period he also served as a commander assistant of a patrol ship (Russian: сторожевой корабль) PR-159 (Petya-class frigate) (military unit 20935) in Donuzlav.

In 1971-72 Kozhyn completed the Higher Special Officer Classes of the Navy in Leningrad. In 1972-75 he was a commander of a patrol ship PR-159 (Note: some sources state that he commanded SKR-6 (Mirka-class frigate) and later SKR-112 (Petya-class frigate).) in Donuzlav and after that was chief of staff for a brigade of minesweepers (military unit 34234), Black Sea Fleet Naval base in Donuzlav.

In 1978-80 Kozhyn attended and completed the Grechko Naval Academy in Leningrad. After that he was a commander of security brigade of water district (military unit 26977), Black Sea Fleet Naval base in Sevastopol. In 1986-92 he served as a chief of staff – deputy commander of the Black Sea Fleet Naval base (military unit 99324) in Donuzlav. During that period in 1987-88 Kozhyn was a member of the Crimean regional council.

In February – April 1992 Kozhyn was commander of the Black Sea Fleet Crimean Naval base (today Southern Naval base) in Donuzlav. On 1 December 1991, the Crimean Naval Base voted for the Ukrainian independence referendum with 93% of approval for independence.

== Notes ==
Military offices
Preceded by revived post Mykhailo Ostrohradskyi (UNR)	Naval Commander of Ukraine; 1992–1993	Succeeded by Volodymyr Bezkorovainy
