= Serhiy Hayduk =

Ukrainian vice admiral

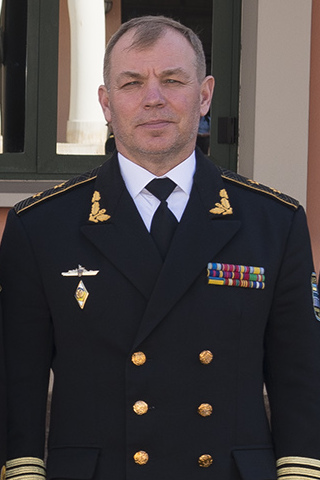
- Hayduk in 2014
- Native name: Сергій Анатолійович Гайдук
- Born: 25 July 1963 (age 63); Dnipropetrovsk, Ukrainian SSR, Soviet Union
- Allegiance: Ukraine
- Branch: Ukrainian Navy
- Service years: 1992–2017
- Rank: Vice Admiral
- Commands: Commander of the Ukrainian Navy
- Conflicts: Annexation of Crimea by the Russian Federation
- Awards: Medal For Military Service to Ukraine Ministry of Defence Badge of Honour

Serhiy Anatoliyovych Hayduk (Ukrainian: Сергій Анатолійович Гайдук; born 25 July 1963) is a Ukrainian Vice Admiral and a former commander of the Ukrainian Navy.

== Career ==
Before becoming commander of the Ukrainian Navy, Hayduk held the staff position in charge of anti-submarine warfare, the position of chief of search and rescue operations, and was the first deputy chief of staff of the navy. In 2007, he prevented an environmental disaster from ensuing when the leaky Russian vessel Odisk arrived in Crimea from Sierra Leone carrying ferroalloys. He was promoted to the rank of rear admiral in 2011.

Hayduk was appointed acting commander on 2 March 2014, and commander on 7 March 2014 following the defection of Denis Berezovsky during the Russian annexation of Crimea. Berezovsky had been dismissed for "high treason" after serving only a single day as commander. On 3 March 2014, Berezovsky, together with several Russian cossacks, had visited high-ranking officers of the Ukrainian Navy and asked them to change allegiance and side with the Russian armed forces in Crimea. After a speech by Hayduk, all the officers rejected the proposal and started to sing the Ukrainian national anthem.

On 19 March 2014, pro-Russian forces took over the Ukrainian Navy's headquarters at Sevastopol and imprisoned its newly appointed commander-in-chief, Hayduk. Hayduk, along with seven other hostages, was held by the pro-Russian so-called "Crimean Security Service" and most of these hostages were tortured while in captivity according to Kharkiv Human Rights Protection Group. The hostages were released by order of the Russian Defense Minister on 20 March 2014.

On 23 August 2014, Hayduk was promoted to vice admiral.

Hayduk was dismissed as commander of the Ukrainian navy by President Poroshenko on 15 April 2016. He was succeeded by Ihor Voronchenko.

== See also ==
- 2014 Russian military intervention in Ukraine
- Hajduk
- List of kidnappings

Military offices
| Preceded by Denis Berezovsky | Naval Commander of Ukraine; 2014–2016 | Succeeded by Ihor Voronchenko |
