= Oleksiy Neizhpapa =

Ukrainian naval commander

- Олексій Неїжпапа
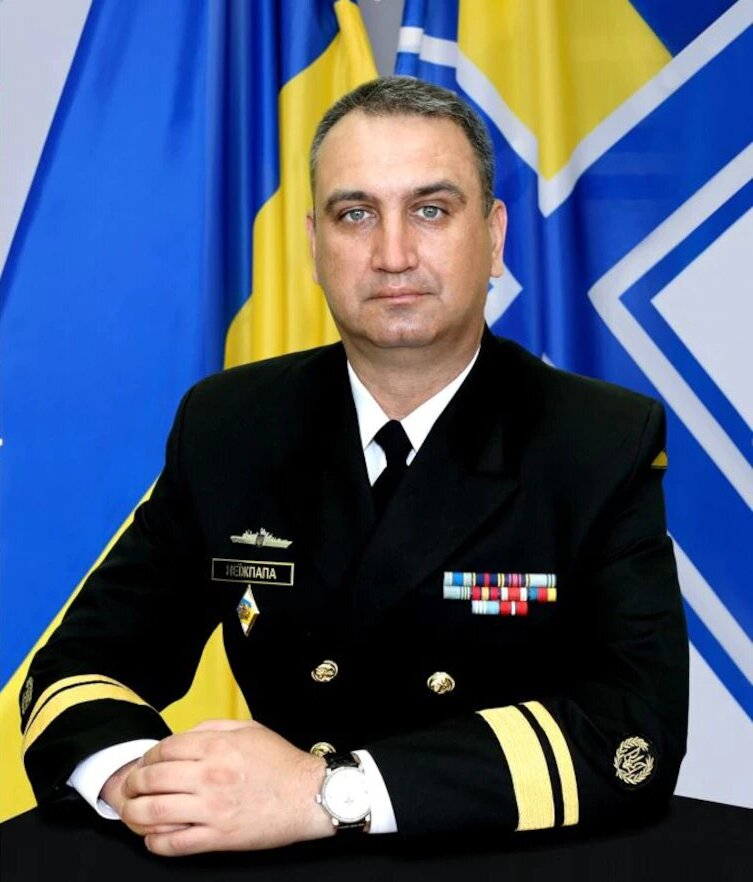
- Official portrait, 2020

Personal details
- Born: 9 October 1975 (age 51) Sevastopol, Ukrainian SSR, USSR

Military service
- Allegiance: Ukraine
- Branch/service: Ukrainian Naval Forces
- Rank: Vice admiral
- Battles/wars: Annexation of Crimea by the Russian Federation; Donbas war 2022 Russian invasion of Ukraine

Oleksiy Leonidovych Neizhpapa (Ukrainian: Олексій Леонідович Неїжпапа; born 9 October 1975) is a Ukrainian vice admiral and a Commander of the Naval Forces of the Ukrainian Navy. Was a Commander of the 1st Surface Ships Brigade.

== Biography ==
Oleksiy Neizhpapa was born on 9 October 1975 in Sevastopol, Ukrainian Soviet Socialist Republic. He graduated from Nakhimov Naval Academy in 1997.

From July 2012 to 2015, he served as the First Deputy Chief of Staff of the Naval Forces Command of the Armed Forces of Ukraine. During this period, from 2013 to 2014, Neizhpapa also temporarily served as the head of the Nakhimov Naval Academy.

In January 2015, Neizhpapa became Deputy Commander of the Ukrainian Navy and Head of the Combat Training Department, and participated in the war in Donbas.

He was appointed Commander of the Ukrainian Navy on 11 June 2020.

Neizhpapa received his promotion to vice admiral two days after the sinking of the Russian Black Sea Fleet's flagship Moskva.
