= Ukrainian frigate Otaman Bilyi =

1967 frigate

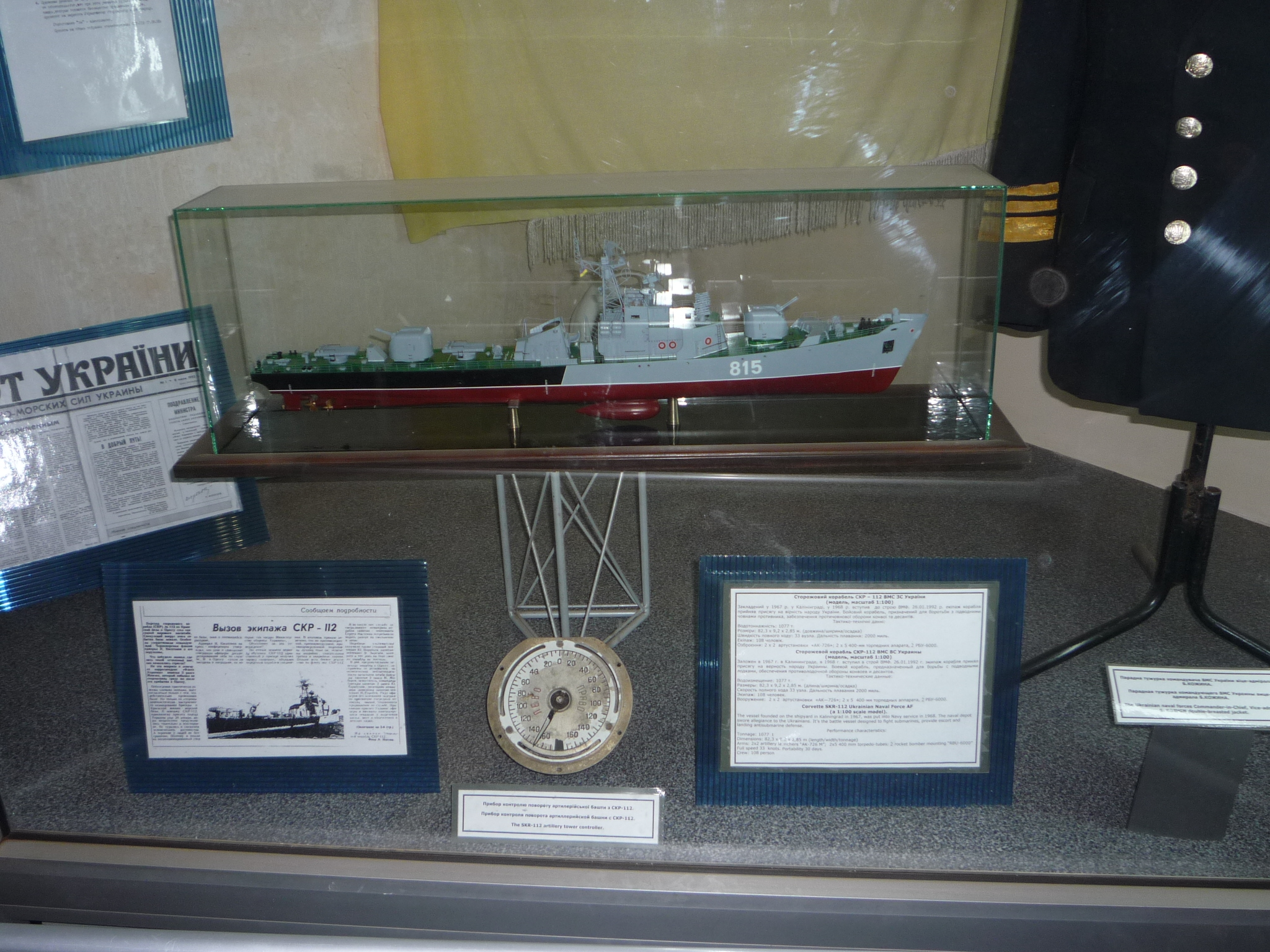
- SKR-112 scale model in the Balaklava Museum of Ukrainian Navy. At the bottom is turret control device from SKR-112

History

Soviet Union
- Name: SKR-112
- Builder: "Yantar", Kaliningrad
- Launched: August 15, 1967
- Commissioned: 1968
- Home port: Crimean Naval Base, Soviet Union
- Fate: 1992 handed over to the Ukrainian Navy

Ukraine
- Name: U132 Otaman Bilyi (unofficial)
- Acquired: 1992
- Decommissioned: December 31, 1993
- Fate: Sold for scrap

General characteristics
- Class & type: Petya-class frigate
- Displacement: 1,077 long tons (1,094 t) standard
- Length: 82.3 m (270 ft)
- Beam: 9.2 m (30 ft 2 in)
- Draught: 2.85 m (9 ft 4 in)
- Installed power: 2
- Propulsion: 2 × turboshaft engines M-2 (30,000 hp); 1 × diesel 61-B (6,000 hp)
- Speed: 33 knots (61 km/h; 38 mph)
- Range: 2,000 nmi (3,700 km; 2,300 mi) at 14 knots (26 km/h; 16 mph)
- Endurance: 10 days
- Crew: 108 (8 Officers)
- Armament: 2 × twin 76 mm (3 in) art system; 2 × RBU-6000 anti-submarine rocket launchers; 2 × 400 mm (16 in) quint torpedo tubes PTA-40-159; 22 × naval mines

Otaman Bilyi (U132) (Ukrainian: Отаман Білий) was a Petya-class frigate of the Ukrainian Navy and formerly the Soviet frigate (guard ship) SKR-112.

== Service history ==
The ship was laid down at the Yantar shipbuilding yard (factory number 191) on April 26, 1967. It entered the service on May 30, 1968 and on September 21 moved from Baltiysk to Sevastopol under jurisdiction of the Black Sea Fleet.

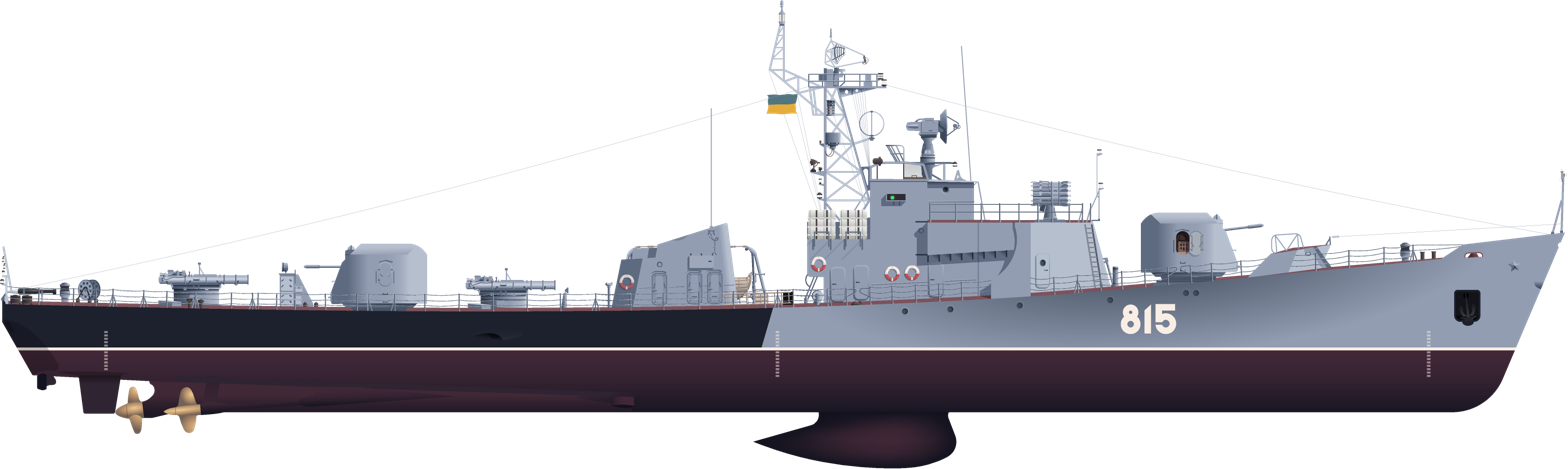
SKR-112 on July 21, 1992

From August 30, 1969 to January 31, 1970 the frigate carried out service in the Mediterranean Sea military zone providing help to the Armed Forces of Egypt during the War of Attrition.

After the declaration of independence of Ukraine, it became the first warship that raised the Ukrainian flag and on July 21, 1992 made an unsanctioned move to Odesa. The initiator of the move was frigate captain Mykola Zhybarev.
