= Mykhailo Ostrohradskyi =

Ukrainian naval officer

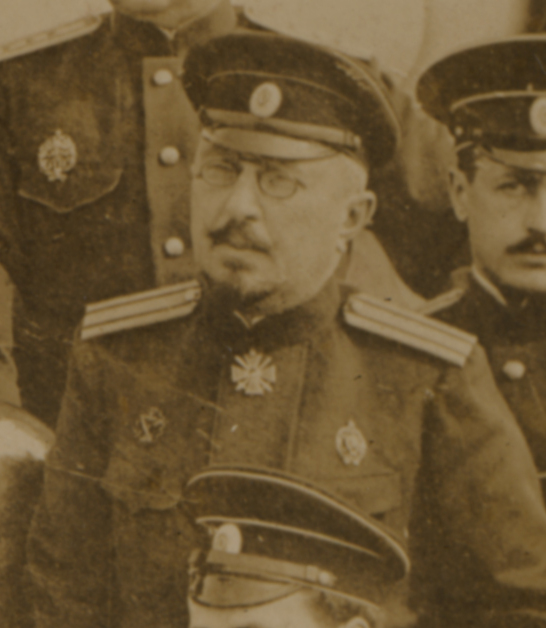
- Born: 21 December 1870 (2 January 1871 N.S.); Poltava Governorate, Russian Empire
- Died: 30 October 1923 (aged 52) Bucharest, Kingdom of Romania
- Allegiance: Russian Empire; Ukrainian State; Ukrainian People's Republic
- Branch: Imperial Russian Navy; Ukrainian Navy
- Service years: 1887–1920
- Rank: Captain 1st rank (Russia); Rear admiral (Ukraine)
- Commands: Cruiser Pamiat Merkuria; Battleship Evstafii; Ukrainian Navy
- Conflicts: World War I Russian Civil War; Polish–Soviet War

Mykhailo Mykhailovich Ostrohradskyi (Ukrainian: Миха́йло Миха́йлович Острогра́дський) or Mikhail Mikhailovich Ostrogradsky (Михаи́л Миха́йлович Острогра́дский; 21 December 1870 [2 January 1871 N.S.] – 30 October 1923) was a Ukrainian naval officer, Captain 1st rank (1917), and in 1918 and 1920 commander of the Ukrainian Navy with the rank of Rear admiral. He is regarder as the founder of the Ukrainian Navy.

== Biography ==
Born into the noble Ostrogradsky family, descendants of the Ukrainian Cossack elite, in Poltava Governorate. He was of the Orthodox faith.

He graduated from the Naval Cadet Corps in Saint Petersburg, and in 1896 completed the Mine Officers’ Class, qualifying as a “1st class mine officer.”

Entering service in 1887 as a naval cadet, he was promoted to midshipman in 1890, then lieutenant and senior lieutenant. On 6 December 1906 he became Captain 2nd rank, serving in the Black Sea Fleet at Sevastopol.

From 1904 to 1905 he was executive officer of the gunboat Zaporozhets, and in 1905–1906 of the gunboat Kubanets.

In 1906–1908 he commanded the destroyer Zhutkiy, and in 1908 served as flag captain to the commander of the Separate Practical Squadron of the Black Sea.

From 1908 to 1911 he commanded the gunboat Terets, and in 1911 the Zaporozhets again.

In 1912–1914 he was flag captain to the commander of the battleship brigade of the Black Sea detachment. Promoted to Captain 1st rank on 6 December 1912.

During World War I, on 28 July 1914 he was appointed commander of the cruiser Pamiat Merkuria (ex-Kagul), one of the most active Black Sea Fleet ships, operating off the Bosporus, Varna, Constanța, and the Caucasian coast. On 4 November 1916, together with the destroyer Pronzitelny, he raided the Romanian port of Constanța, then held by Turkish–Bulgarian forces. In November–December 1916, his cruiser supported Danube estuary landings on the Romanian Front, and engaged the German–Turkish fleet.

From November 1916 to May 1917 he commanded the battleship Evstafii. In May 1917 he joined a commission granting wartime privileges to naval personnel. He was married with two children.

After the February Revolution and the rise of the Ukrainian Central Rada, Ostrogradsky actively supported the Ukrainization of the Black Sea Fleet and the creation of Ukrainian naval forces.

In 1918 he was promoted to rear admiral and served as Naval Minister of the Ukrainian State (1 May – 29 July 1918), commanding the Ukrainian fleet in Sevastopol.

After the fall of the Hetmanate he served in the Armed Forces of South Russia, though some accounts state he resigned in January 1919 and lived privately in Odesa.

On 17 April 1920, shortly before the joint Polish–Ukrainian offensive on Kyiv, Symon Petliura appointed him “Chief of the Fleet and Deputy Minister of War for Naval and Merchant Marine Affairs.”

After the Polish–Soviet War ended in late 1920 and the UPR army was interned in Poland, he emigrated to Romania, where he took a flying course. He then worked at the Ukrainian Embassy in Bucharest, until its closure in 1922, while living at the Athenee Palace Hotel. He died in Bucharest on 30 October 1923 and is buried in the Romanian capital.

== Awards ==
Russian Empire

- Medal In Memory of the Reign of Emperor Alexander III (1896)
- Order of Saint Anna, 3rd Class (1902)
- Order of Saint Stanislaus, 2nd Class (6 Dec 1907)
- Medal In Memory of the 300th Anniversary of the Romanov Dynasty (1913)
- Order of Saint Anna, 2nd Class (6 Dec 1913)
- Medal In Memory of the 200th Anniversary of the Battle of Gangut (1915)
- Swords to the Order of Saint Anna, 2nd Class (23 Feb 1915)
- Order of Saint Vladimir, 3rd Class with Swords (18 Apr 1915)

Distinctions

- Gold badge for completing the full course of the Naval Cadet Corps (1910)

Foreign

- Bulgarian Order "For Military Merit", 4th Class (Officer's Cross; 1903)
- Jerusalem Cross of the Holy Sepulchre with a Relic of the True Cross (1906)
- Bulgarian Order "For Military Merit", 3rd Class (Commander's Cross; 1908)
- Order of the Redeemer (Greece), Commander's Cross (1910)

== Legacy ==
After 2014, streets in several Ukrainian cities were named after Admiral Ostrogradsky. In 2020, the 35th Separate Marine Brigade of the Ukrainian Naval Infantry was named in his honor.
