= Bar Raion =

Former subdivision of Vinnytsia Oblast, Ukraine

Coordinates: 49°04′N 27°41′E

Bar Raion Барський район
- Raion
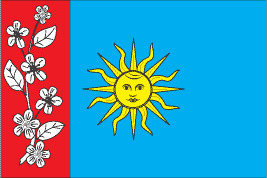
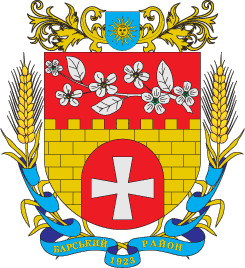
- Flag Coat of arms

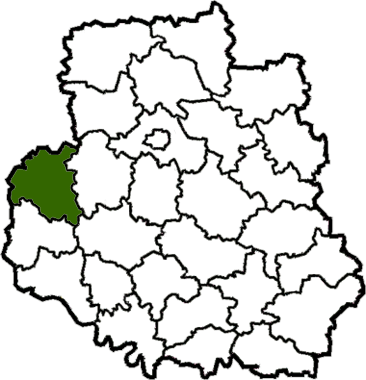
- Country: Ukraine
- Oblast: Vinnytsia Oblast
- Established: 1923
- Disestablished: 18 July 2020
- Admin. center: Bar
- Subdivisions: List: 1 — city councils; 1 — settlement councils; 27 — rural councils; Number of localities: 1 — cities; 1 — urban-type settlements; 85 — villages; — rural settlements

Government
  - Governor: Mykola Radionov

Area
  - Total: 1,100 km^{2} (420 sq mi)

Population (2020)
  - Total: 50,000 ▼
  - Density: 45/km^{2} (120/sq mi)
- Time zone: UTC+02:00 (EET)
  - Summer (DST): UTC+03:00 (EEST)
- Postal index: 23000—23063
- Area code: +380 4341
- Website: http://www.barrda.com.ua/

Bar Raion (Ukrainian: Барський район) was one of raions of Vinnytsia Oblast, located in southwestern Ukraine. The administrative center of the raion was the town of Bar. The raion was abolished and its territory was merged into Zhmerynka Raion on 18 July 2020 as part of the administrative reform of Ukraine, which reduced the number of raions of Vinnytsia Oblast to six. The last estimate of the raion population was 50,000 (2020 est.).
