= Ukrainian Navy =

Maritime force of Ukraine

Ukrainian Naval Forces
- Військово-морські сили Збройних сил України, ВМС ЗСУ
- Emblem of the Ukrainian Naval Forces
- Active: 1917–1921; 1992–present
- Country: Ukraine
- Type: Navy
- Role: Naval warfare
- Size: 30.000 (2024)
- Part of: Armed Forces of Ukraine
- Garrison/HQ: Odesa
- Colors: Blue; Gold
- March: March of the VMS of Ukraine (Марш ВМС України)
- Anniversaries: Navy Day
- Battle honours: Ukrainian–Soviet War; Operation Ocean Shield; Operation Atalanta; Russo-Ukrainian War
- Website: navy.mil.gov.ua/en/

Commanders
- Commander: Vice Admiral Oleksiy Neizhpapa
- Spokesperson: Dmytro Pletenchuk

Insignia
- Ensign

- Jack

- Pennant

- Shoulder sleeve insignia (Note: Adopted in 2016.)

The Ukrainian Navy (Ukrainian: Військово-морські сили Збройних сил України, ВМС ЗСУ, romanized: Viiskovo–morski syly Zbroinykh syl Ukrainy, VMS ZSU, lit. 'Military Naval Forces of the Armed Forces of Ukraine') is the maritime force of Ukraine, and one of the eight service branches of the Armed Forces of Ukraine.

The naval forces consist of five components: surface forces, submarine forces, naval aviation, coastal rocket artillery, and naval infantry. In 2022, the Ukrainian Navy had 15,000 personnel, including 6,000 naval infantry. It is headquartered in Odesa; prior to the 2014 annexation of Crimea by the Russian Federation, it was based in Sevastopol.

Ukraine's navy was composed largely of remnants of the Soviet Black Sea Fleet. Ukraine had sought to update and expand its naval forces, including planning a new class of frigates, patrol boats, and gunboats. However, since the ongoing Russian invasion of the country began in February 2022, the Ukrainian Navy has been severely diminished, with all its largest warships being lost, including its flagship, which was scuttled a month into the war to prevent capture.

The Ukrainian Navy previously operated in the Black Sea, including the Sea of Azov and Danube Delta; additionally, it took part in multinational efforts such as Operation Active Endeavour and Operation Atalanta in the Mediterranean and Horn of Africa, respectively. However, Russia gained complete control of the Sea of Azov and significant control of the Black Sea during the ongoing conflict.

Despite its reduced size and capabilities, Ukrainian Naval Forces remain operationally active via the use of naval asymmetrical warfare and the use of sea drones, allowing the Ukrainian Navy to hamper the operations of its Russian counterpart, limiting their naval control over the Black Sea.

== History ==
=== Zaporizhian (Ukrainian) Cossacks Fleet, c. 1600s ===
The Ukrainian Naval Forces trace their origins to the Zaporizhian Sich Cossacks, who would frequently raid Ottoman settlements along the Black Sea coast. Cossacks used small ships called chaikas, which were similar in design to Viking long ships. Although technologically inferior to the Turks, the Cossacks had great success against their opponent. In 1614, the Cossack forces were able to raid and destroy Trabzon.

In 1615, the Cossacks were able to mount a raid on Istanbul itself, destroying several suburbs of the city. In 1616, a Cossack fleet was able to reach the Bosphorus, once again raiding the surrounding countryside. A Turkish fleet sent to destroy the Cossack forces was defeated in 1617. The Cossacks once again managed to mount an attack on Istanbul in 1625, forcing the Sultan to temporarily flee the capital.

The Cossacks used several strategies to attack the larger Ottoman naval forces, such as positioning their ships during battle in a way where the sun was always at their back. The Cossack ships were small with a low profile, making them hard to hit by cannon. Cossacks were typically armed with small arm muskets, and during battle had the goal of killing the crew and boarding the ship to take it over, rather than sinking the ship.

=== Ukrainian People's Republic navy (1917–1921) ===
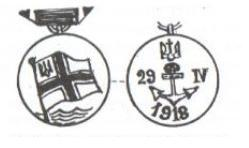
A medal of the Ukrainian fleet of April 29, 1918

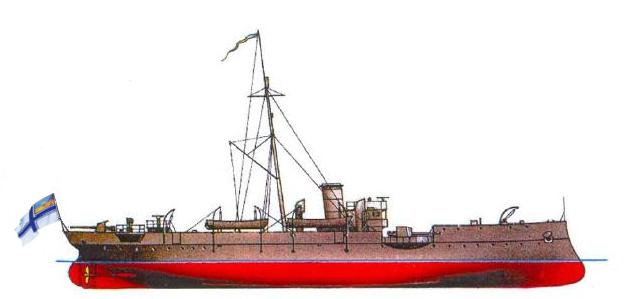
Gunboat "Donets" of Ukrainian Naval Forces, July–November 1918

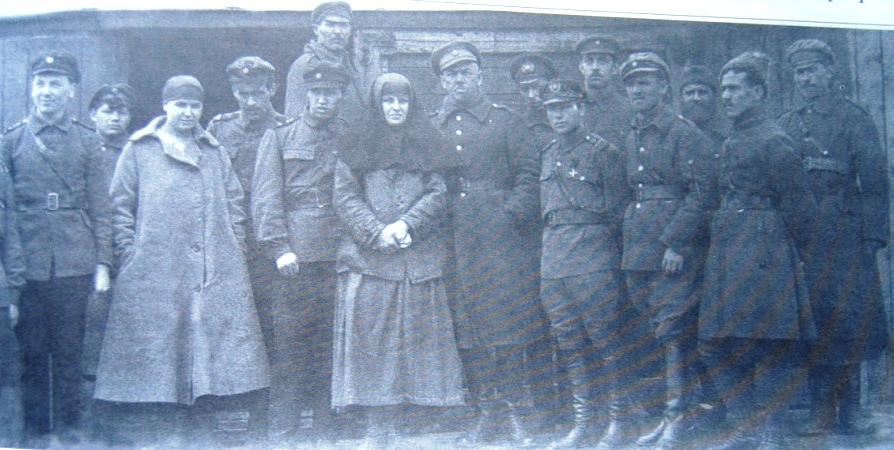
Ukrainian marines in 1921

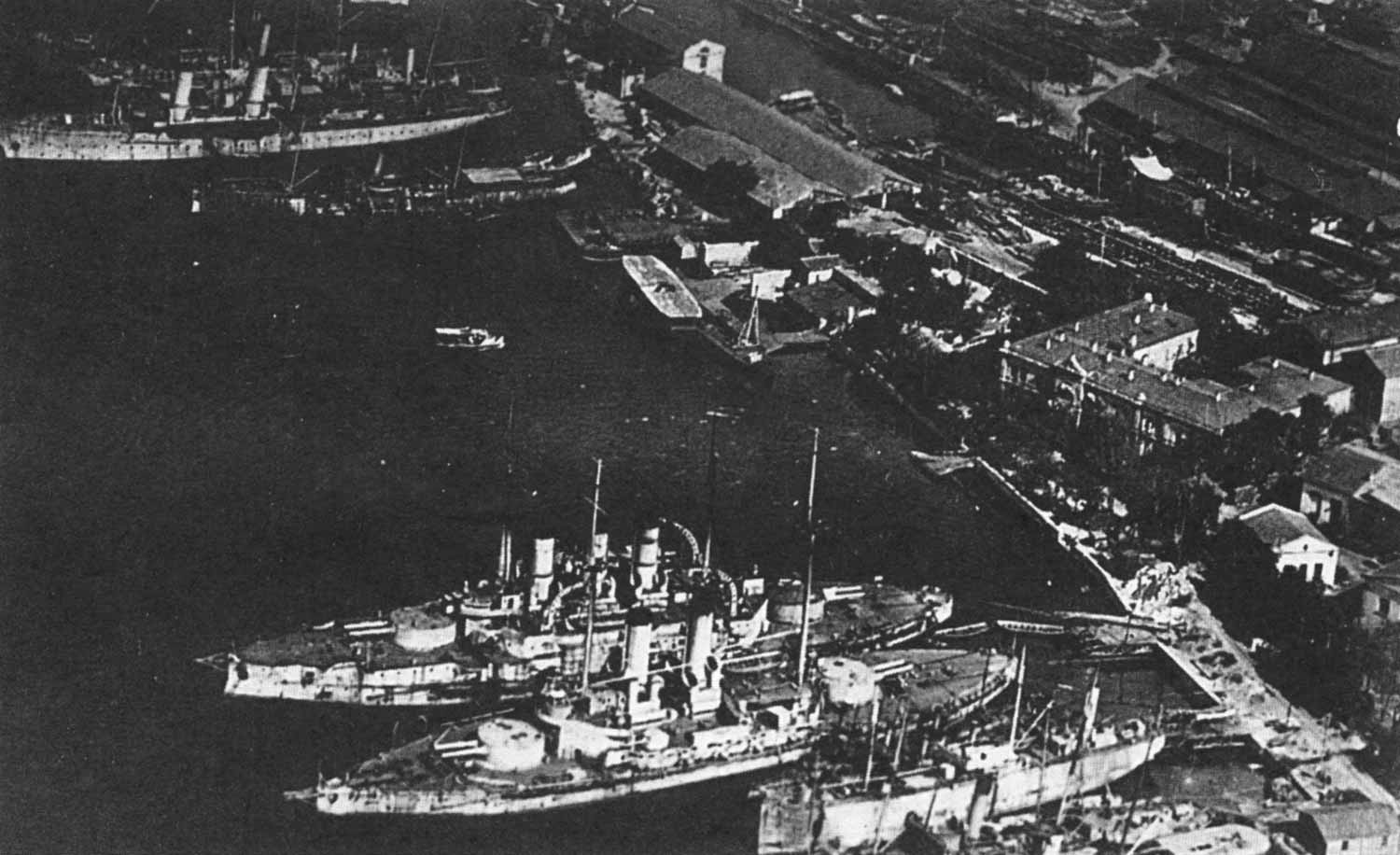
Ukrainian warships in the port of Sevastopol, 1918

During the 1917 Russian Revolution, several ships of the Russian Imperial Navy's Black Sea Fleet, commanded and crewed by ethnic Ukrainians, declared themselves the Navy of the newly autonomous Ukrainian People's Republic. Black Sea Fleet commander Mikhail Sablin raised the colours of the Ukrainian National Republic on 29 April 1918. Few further steps on establishing a navy were made as the Ukrainian government lost control over coastal territories.

After the Revolution 1917 the Central Committee of the Black Sea Fleet. was in command.

The Ukrainian People's Republic aspired to take control of the Fleet. On 17 October 1917 the 2nd rank Captain Ye.Akimov was appointed the representative of the Central Council of Ukraine at the command of the Black Sea Fleet. The General Secretariat for Naval Affairs was established within the government of the Central Rada in Kyiv (in January 1918 it was reformed in a Ministry). The head of it became D. Antonovich. The Main Navy Staff was led by Captain Jerzy Świrski. For the educational and agitational purposes of the seamen the Central Rada seconded the commissars to Odesa, Mykolaiv, Kherson and Sevastopol. On 22 December 1917 the Naval Ministry in Kyiv was established.

Starting October 1917, the crews of the ships established military councils; the blue-yellow flags were flying from the masts. The ships Zavidny and Russian cruiser Pamiat Merkuria (1907) were the first examples.

In November 1917 in Sevastopol was established the Sahaidachny Sea Battalion (kurin) which on 24 November 1917 was sent to Kyiv to extinguish Bolshevik uprisings and participated in the Kiev Arsenal January Uprising.

On 22 November 1917 the whole crew of the newest and most powerful warship of the Black Sea Fleet Volya swore fealty to the Central Rada, followed soon by several ships and submarines. In December 1917 the Black Seas Fleet squadron under Ukrainian flags led by the Russian battleship Imperator Aleksandr III and included another cruiser and three destroyers participated in the evacuation of the 127th Infantry Division from Trabzon back to Ukraine.

On 29 December 1917, most of the Black Sea Fleet was taken over by the Bolsheviks.

As part of Operation Faustschlag, the forces of the German Empire had been advancing on Sevastopol with a goal to capture the Black Sea Fleet. Having no support from the land forces, Admiral Sablin was forced enter negotiations regarding cessation of hostilities. However, the Germans rejected the armistice proposals and the advance continued. In April 1918, German and Ukrainian troops invaded Crimea.

On 29 April 1918, fleet-commanding Rear-admiral Sablin (Russian) gave an order to hoist Ukrainian national flags over all ships in Sevastopol (the medal to the right commemorates that event). That day he was appointed commander-in-chief of the Ukrainian Navy. A telegram to Kyiv was sent from the staff ship Georgiy Pobedonosets, stating: “Effective today the Sevastopol fortress and the Fleet in Sevastopol raised the Ukrainian flag. Admiral Sablin assumed the command of the Fleet”. Having no reply, the admiral ordered the telegram repeated, beginning with the words “Comrades of Kiev Central Rada...”.

Sablin was unaware that at that moment, the Central Rada in Kyiv was already history. The Germans started to occupy Sevastopol, because the Bolsheviks began to lead away ships. Centroflot (the combined fleet revolutionary committee), in order to save the Fleet, took a decision to move it to Novorossiysk. But on 30 April 1918, only the small part of the fleet under command of Admiral Sablin, which trusted the Bolsheviks, headed for Novorossiysk and hoisted Russian St. Andrew (saltire) ensigns. The greater part of the Ukrainian fleet remained in Sevastopol – there were 30 destroyers and torpedo boats, 25 auxiliaries, 7 battleships and small craft as well as 15 submarines left in Sevastopol under Admiral Myhaylo Ostrogradskiy who in this situation assumed command.

On 1 May 1918 Germans captured the ships remaining in Sevastopol, because the actions of Bolsheviks violated the peace agreement. On 17 June 1918, 1 dreadnought and 6 destroyers returned from Novorossiysk to Sevastopol, where they were also captured. The greater part of the ships remaining in Novorossiysk were destroyed by their own crews on Lenin's command. In July–November 1918 Germans gradually transferred many ships to the command of the Ukrainian government (Hetman Pavlo Skoropadskyi).

The main Ukrainian sea power concentrated in Odesa and Mykolaiv was more than 20 minesweepers, 7 small cruisers, 1 dreadnought and more than 30 auxiliaries. In Sevastopol there were only 2 old battleships under Ukrainian flags. On 18 July 1918 the Naval Ministry in Kyiv established new naval ensigns and some rank flags (e.g. the flags of the Naval Minister and the Deputy Minister). The old Russian jack remained as the Ukrainian naval jack. It was regarded as the symbol of glory of the Black Sea Fleet, whose crews were in large part previously Ukrainian. On 17 September, the Germans gave Ukraine 17 U-boats.

In December 1918, when the Entente’s naval forces were approaching Sevastopol, Ukrainian Rear Admiral V. Klokhkovskyy commanded all ships to hoist Russian St. Andrew (saltire) ensigns to demonstrate good intentions towards the Entente. However, the Entente captured the Black Sea Fleet and subsequently transferred it to the Russian "White" forces. Only a small number of naval infantry subdivisions remained in Ukrainian hands. Despite this loss, the Ukrainian naval authorities existed until 1921.

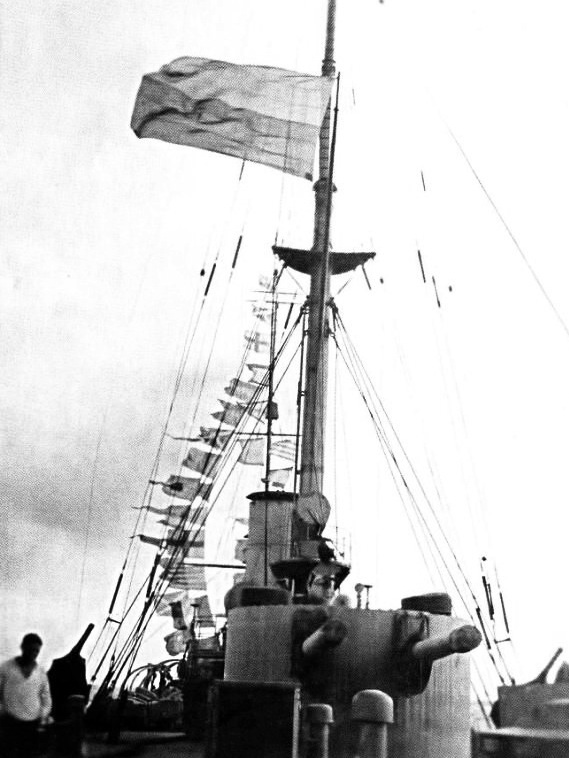
Blue and yellow flag on cruiser Pamiat Merkuria, November 1917

=== Contemporary Navy of Ukraine ===
==== Independence and the "Battle for the oath" ====
Ukraine's naval jack in 1992

The origins of the contemporary Ukrainian Naval Forces intertwined with the fate of the Soviet Black Sea Fleet and with the modern history of the Crimea. Following the dissolution of the Soviet Union (1991), the administration of the Soviet Armed Forces passed to the Joint Armed Forces of the Commonwealth of Independent States (CIS) for a transitional period pending agreement on the division of the ex-Soviet military between members of the former Soviet Union. Marshal of Aviation Yevgeny Shaposhnikov became commander of the Joint CIS Armed Forces command on 14 February 1992.

On 6 December 1991 the Supreme Council of Ukraine (Verkhovna Rada) adopted a resolution on the laws of Ukraine "About the Defense of Ukraine" and "About the Armed Forces of Ukraine", as well as the text of a military oath. On the same day, in the chamber of the parliament of Ukraine, the Minister of Defense of Ukraine, Kostyantyn Morozov, became the first person to take the oath. On 10 December 1991, the Supreme Council of Ukraine ratified the Belavezha Accords.

On 12 December 1991, the president of Ukraine issued ukase #4, ordering all military formations based in Ukraine to pledge allegiance by 20 January 1992. The vast majority of the Black Sea Fleet ignored the order. On 1 January 1992 the newspaper Vympyel of the Black Sea Fleet Filipp Oktyabrskiy Training unit (edited by Captain-Lieutenant Mykola Huk) published the military oath and the anthem of Ukraine in the Ukrainian language.

On 3 January 1992 Ukraine started the practical formation of its national armed forces. On 8 January 1992 the Officers' Assembly of the Black Sea Fleet appealed to all leaders of the CIS to recognise the Black Sea Fleet as an operational-strategic formation and not subordinate to Ukraine. On 12 January 1992, the brigade of border troops in Balaklava (Sevastopol) became the first military formation to pledge allegiance to Ukraine.

On 14 January 1992 the governor of Sevastopol appealed to the Supreme Councils of both Ukraine and the Russian Federation, urging faster adoption of a decision on the status of the Black Sea Fleet. On 16 January 1992, an agreement between the CIS members was signed on the oath in strategic formations.

On 18 January 1992, the 3rd company of the divers school became the first formation of the Black Sea Fleet to pledge their allegiance to Ukraine, along with the Maritime Department of the Sevastopol Institute of Instrument Engineering. On the next day, forty-six naval pilots pledged their allegiance to Ukraine at the central square (Ploshcha Lenina) of Mykolaiv.

Black Sea Fleet military personnel previously under the oath of the Soviet Armed Forces did not hasten to pledge allegiance to the newly formed state. First Deputy Commander-in-Chief of the Russian Navy Fleet Admiral Ivan Kapitanets issued a directive: "to apply severe sanctions, including dismissal from office and separation from service to officers, midshipmen, and warrant officers who create an unhealthy situation in military communities that are prone to treason and taking the oath of allegiance to Ukraine". Nonetheless, on 26 January 1992 the 17th Brigade of Ships for the Guarding the Water Area of the Crimea Naval Base followed the example of the divers.

Right before the Soviet Army and Navy Day (23 February) on 22 February, the 880th Independent Naval Infantry Battalion of Black Sea Fleet pledged allegiance to Ukraine. The battalion had been recognized as the best formation of the fleet in 1991. The Main Navy Staff in Moscow issued an order to dissolve the battalion. After the incident, all military units of the Black Sea Fleet recruited exclusively Russians.

According to estimations by the International Institute for Strategic Studies, in January 1992 the Black Sea Fleet accounted for 80,000 servicemen, 69 major warships including 3 aircraft carriers, 6 missile cruisers, 29 submarines, 235 warplanes and helicopters, and a great number of auxiliary fleet ships. Without informing Ukraine with which it supposed to share control over the Black Sea Fleet in a framework of the Joint Armed Forces Command, the Russian Federation was selling away several ships.

From the beginning of the post-Soviet period, the relationship between Russia and Ukraine was tense. In January 1992, the Supreme Soviet of Russia raised the question of the political status of Crimea (Crimean ASSR) and of the constitutionality of the 1954 decision to transfer of Crimean Oblast of the Russian SFSR to the Ukrainian SSR, accusing Nikita Khrushchev of treason against the Russian people. Although never annulled, many Russian parliamentarians refused to recognize the legal document, pointing out the procedural errors during its adoption.

The Ukrainian side issued reminders of the number of international treaties and agreements between the two countries, such as the 19 November 1990 treaty between the Russian SFSR and the Ukrainian SSR, in which both sides recognized the territorial integrity of the other, as well as the Belavezha Accords (an agreement on creation of the CIS) of 8 December 1991 and the Alma-Ata Protocol of 21 December 1991.

Noticing not much reaction from the Black Sea Fleet command located on the territory of Ukraine, on 5 April 1992 the President of Ukraine issued Decree #209 "About urgent measures on development of the Armed Forces of Ukraine", which accused the Russian Federation and the Joint Armed Forces command of intervening in the internal affairs of Ukraine. On 6 April 1992, a session of the 6th Congress of People's Deputies of the Russian SFSR refused to accept the Belavezha agreement as previously ratified by the Supreme Council of the Russian SFSR (on 12 December 1991). Also, on 6 April 1992, the president of Ukraine appointed Borys Kozhyn as the Commander of Ukrainian Naval Forces. The next day, the president of Russia issued a Decree "On the transfer of the Black Sea Fleet under jurisdiction of the Russian Federation". On 9 April 1992, the effect of both decrees were suspended until the end of the Russian-Ukrainian talks.

==== Ukrainian division of the Black Sea Fleet (1991–1997) ====
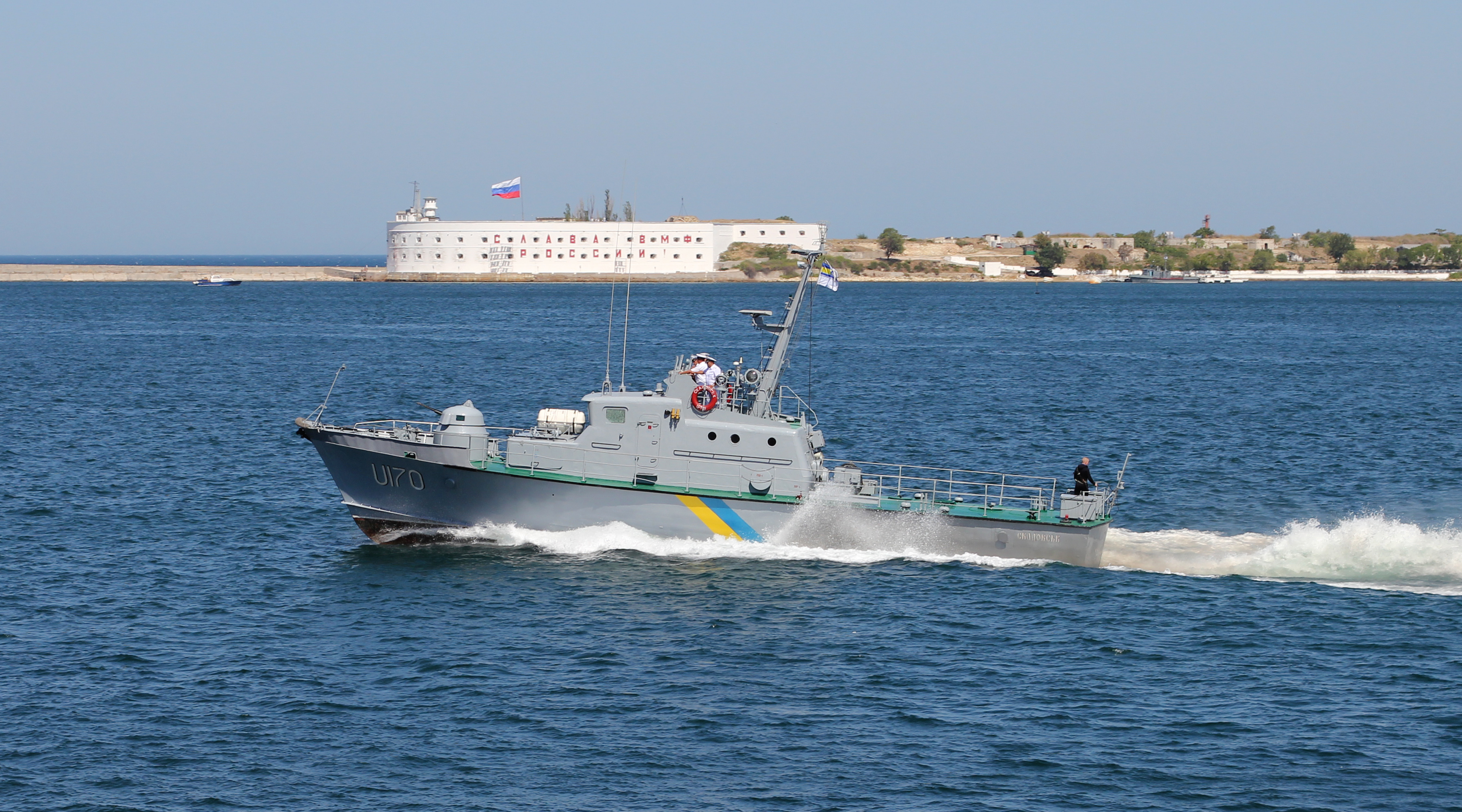
Ukrainian Navy artillery boat Zhuk class U170 Skadovs'k off the Bay of Sevastopol, Crimea

In September 1991, an office of the Society of Ukrainian Officers was opened in Sevastopol on the initiative of Major Volodymyr Kholodyuk and captains-lieutenant Ihor Tenyukh and Mykola Huk. The society became the initiator and nucleus of the organization of the Ukrainian Naval Forces.

On 7 April 1992 at 17:00, 37 officers of the administration and headquarters of the Crimean Naval Base (an administrative entity and not a physical "base") pledged their allegiance and loyalty to people of Ukraine. Rear Admiral Borys Kozhyn, who was in charge, was not present at that time of the event. He was in the office of Ivan Yermakov accepting a proposition of the First Deputy Chairman of the Supreme Council of Ukraine to become the commander of the future Ukrainian Naval Forces.

On 8 April 1992 the minister of defense signed a directive "About creation of the Ukrainian Naval Forces". On 13 April 1992 an organizational group was established regarding the creation of the Ukrainian Naval Forces, which upset the command of the Black Sea Fleet.

The current history of the Ukrainian Naval Forces began on 1 August 1992, when it was formally established by order of the president of Ukraine Leonid Kravchuk. This was followed by a long and controversial dispute and partition of the Soviet Black Sea Fleet between newly independent Ukraine and the Russian Federation.

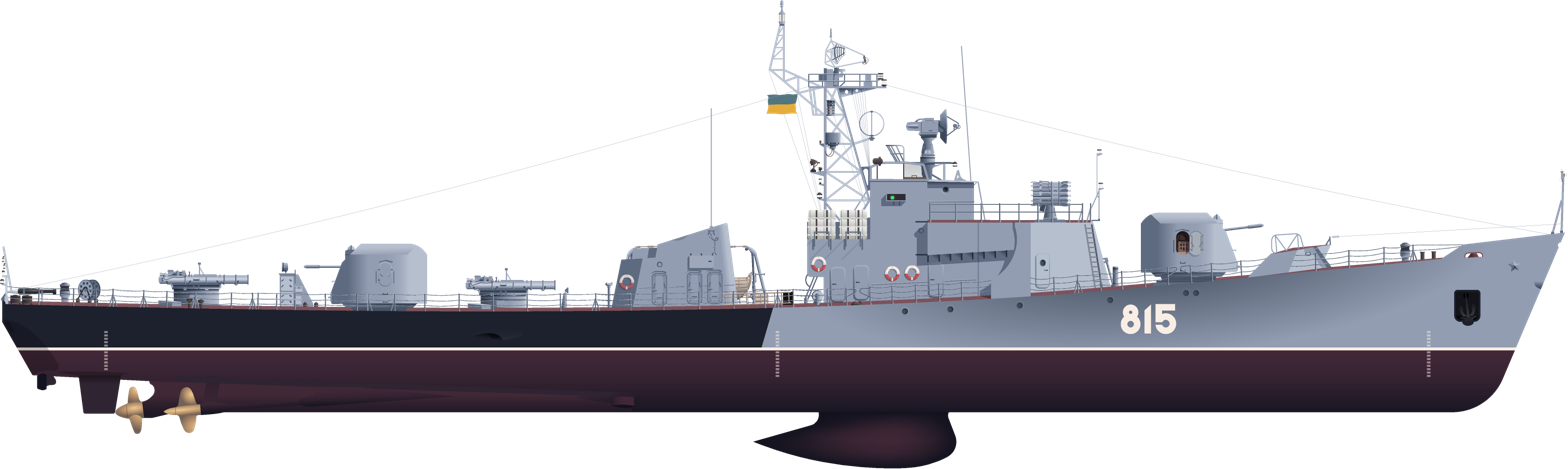
SKR-112 on 20 July 1992

One of the episodes of this process was the story of SKR-112 – effectively the first Ukrainian Navy ship. On 20 July 1992, the crew of SKR-112 declared itself a Ukrainian ship and raised the Ukrainian flag. The Navy headquarters in Moscow considered this a mutiny and attempted to act accordingly. The ship left its base on the Crimean peninsula bound for Odesa, causing a chase and ramming attempts by ships still loyal to Moscow. Soon several other ships, auxiliary vessels, and coastal units of the Black Sea Fleet followed SKR-112's decision but with less violent outcomes.

It was only in 1997 that the ships and equipment of the Black Sea Fleet were officially divided between the two countries. The new Russian formation retained its historic name "Black Sea Fleet". Under the terms of a negotiated lease agreement it was also granted rights to use the majority of its bases on the Crimea Peninsula, Ukraine on a renewable ten-year lease basis at least until 2017.

The newly established Ukrainian Naval Forces received dozens of vessels (mostly obsolete or inoperative, not unlike some of those retained by Russia) and some shore-based infrastructure. The Russian Navy lost several important facilities, most notably the NITKA (Russian acronym for "Scientific testing simulator for shipborne aviation") naval aviation training facility in Saky, and the special forces base in Ochakiv. The process of fleet division remained painful since many aspects of the two navies' co-existence were under-regulated, causing recurring conflicts.

==== Lack of financing and neglect (1998–2014) ====
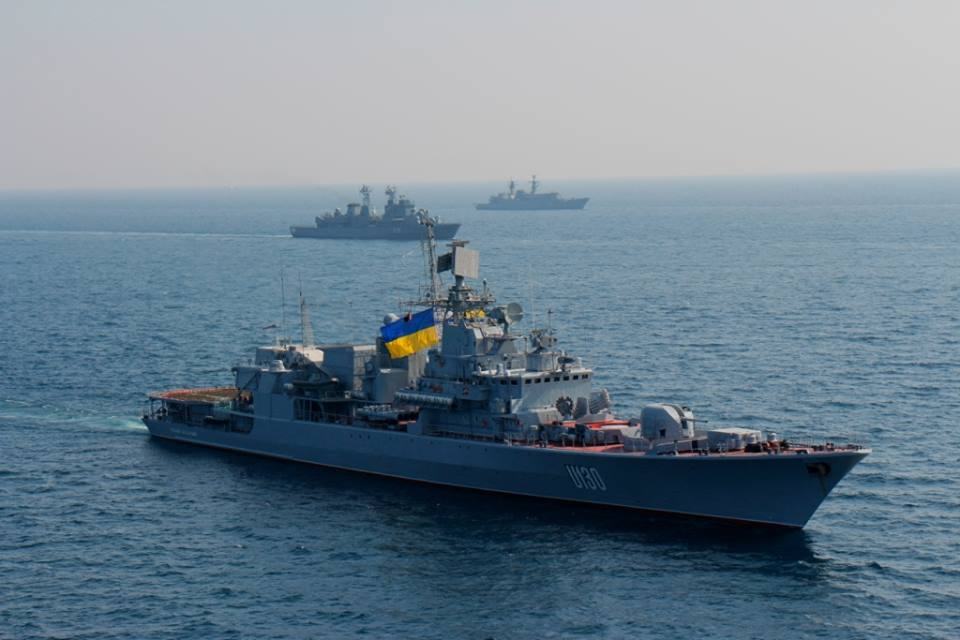
The Krivak III-class frigate Hetman Sahaydachniy was the flagship of the Ukrainian Navy until 2022.

From 1997 due to lack of financing and neglect most of the Ukrainian naval units have been scrapped or poorly maintained. By 2009, only the frigate Hetman Sahaydachniy, originally built to be a Soviet Border Guards ship, was capable of long endurance missions.

Joint exercises of the Ukrainian Naval Forces and the Russian Black Sea Fleet resumed after a seven-year interval in 2010.

The Ukrainian naval assets, as those of the other branches of the armed forces, consisted mainly of Soviet-era equipment. No major plan for modernization emerged, except for a new corvette design completed in 2009 but not built.

On 19 December 2008, United States Ambassador to Ukraine William B. Taylor, Jr. stated that Ukrainian Defense Minister Yuriy Yekhanurov and US Defense Secretary Robert Gates were discussing the purchase by Ukraine of one to three U.S. Navy frigates.

In December 2009, the design for a new Volodymyr Velykyi-class corvette (designed exclusively by Ukraine and to be built at Ukrainian shipyards) for the Ukrainian Naval Forces was completed. That month the Ukrainian defense ministry and Chernomorsky Shipyard (Mykolaiv) signed a contract upon results of the governmental tender for corvettes. The Shipbuilding Research and Design Center (Mykolaiv) was selected as the project developer.

If built, the ship was supposed to operate in the Black and Mediterranean seas. Her endurance would be 30 days, and her displacement 2,500 tons. Leading European arms manufacturers like DCNS, MBDA, and EuroTorp were to deliver weapons for the project. Commissioning of the lead ship was scheduled for 2016. There was a plan to build four corvettes before 2021. According to the corvette construction program approved by the Ukrainian government in March 2011, the overall amount of program financing till 2021 would be about ₴16.22 billion.

In 2007 and prior to the 2014 Russian annexation of Crimea, 15,470 people served in the Ukrainian navy.

Anti-piracy operations in Somalia

A Ukrainian ship carrying military cargo was hijacked off the coast of Somalia on 23 September 2008. The ship was released on 6 February 2009. All commercial news sources reported that the vessel was released after a ransom had been paid. Ukrainian officials, however, stated that special forces eliminated the pirates and retook the ship.

In October 2013 Ukraine deployed its flagship, the frigate Hetman Sahaydachniy, as part of NATO's Operation Ocean Shield anti-piracy mission in the Gulf of Aden. The ship was deployed for a 3-month mission and operated alongside the Norwegian frigate HNoMS Fridtjof Nansen, the Royal Danish frigate HDMS Esbern Snare, and the US Navy's frigate USS De Wert.

The Naval Forces of Ukraine once again deployed Hetman Sahaydachniy with an anti-submarine Ka-27 helicopter aboard to the coast of Somalia as part of the European Union's Operation Atalanta on 3 January 2014. The ship was recalled on 3 March 2014 to Ukraine in response to the annexation of Crimea by the Russian Federation.

==== Russian annexation of Crimea ====
Prior to 2014, Ukraine maintained a very modest naval force. The majority of the bases of the Ukrainian Navy, along with 12,000 of Ukraine's 15,450 Navy personnel were stationed in Crimea. On 24 March 2014, at least 12 of Ukraine's 17 ships in Sevastopol were seized by Russia, while the ensuing conflict saw two Ukrainian navy officers killed by Russian marines.

Ukraine lost control of its Navy's main underground ammunition-storage site at the Inkerman valley, outside Sevastopol, as well as of its helicopter-repair facilities. The Navy's 750-strong 1st Naval Infantry Battalion at Feodosia was arrested and its equipment seized. The Ukrainian Navy also lost all its missile boats. In addition, 51 mainly auxiliaries ships were lost, though most were eventually returned to Ukraine after a brief internment.

In 2015, the Ukrainian navy had 6,500 personnel.

The Ukrainian Naval Infantry was equally affected by the crisis as Russian forces besieged them within their bases. Russia eventually confiscated all military equipment of the naval infantry stationed in Crimea, including the assets of the Ukrainian Naval Aviation, though several planes and helicopters managed to make their way to mainland Ukraine prior to the Russian incorporation of Crimea. The 10th Saky Naval Aviation Brigade, controlling all the Ukrainian Navy's air units, managed to get a number of its aircraft airborne to bases in mainland Ukraine on 5 March 2014. However, more than a dozen aircraft and helicopters undergoing maintenance had to be abandoned.

In the aftermath, the Ukraine Navy relocated its main operational base to its Western Naval Base in Odesa. The current fleet consists of 11, mostly small operational ships, one frigate commissioned in 1993 and four corvettes. Russia also returned a Polnocny-class landing ship to Ukraine, restoring Ukraine's amphibious assault capabilities. On 8 April 2014, an agreement was reached between Russia and Ukraine to return interned vessels to Ukraine and "for the withdrawal of an undisclosed number of Ukrainian aircraft seized in Crimea".

Russian Navy sources had claimed the Ukrainian ships were "not operational because they are old, obsolete, and in poor condition". 35 ships were returned before Russia unilaterally suspended the return of the remainder, alleging that Ukraine had failed to renew its unilaterally declared ceasefire on 1 July 2014 in the war in Donbas. 16 minor auxiliary ships are yet to be returned to Ukraine.

The majority of the forces regrouped in Odesa, with the coast guard relocating its relatively small force to Mariupol on the Azov Sea. The frigate Hetman Sahaydachniy was recalled from a deployment along the Somalian coast and deployed from its port in Odesa to intercept Russian naval vessels crossing into Ukraine's waters on 14 March 2014. The remainder of Ukrainian naval forces continues to patrol the nation's territorial sea.

On 11 January 2018, Russia stated that it was "ready to return Ukrainian military ships that are still in Crimea", along with "aviation equipment and armored vehicles."

On 29 April 2018 Ukrainian president Petro Poroshenko and Prime Minister Volodymyr Groysman greeted Ukrainian Navy personnel on the 100th anniversary since the foundation of Ukraine's Navy. The Black Sea Fleet raised the colours of the Ukrainian National Republic on 29 April 2018.

As of 2020, several captured ships of the Ukrainian Navy remain interned by Russia.

Defections to Russia

When Crimea was annexed by Russia, a number of Ukrainian Navy servicemen defected to Russia. Among those were members of the upper echelon of command of the Ukrainian Navy. The Ukrainian Navy compiled and released a list of defecting officers, calling their actions treasonous.

- Vice Admiral Sergei Yeliseyev, a first deputy commander and acting commander-in-chief of the Ukrainian Navy from 19 February to 1 March 2014.
- Rear Admiral Dmitriy Shakuro, a first deputy commander and chief of staff for the Ukrainian Navy.
- Rear Admiral Denis Berezovsky, commander-in-chief of the Ukrainian Navy for one day, now a Black Sea Fleet deputy commander and chief of the combat training directorate.
- Colonel Sergei Tarkhov, a chief of staff assistant in organization and sustainment of international relations.
- Michman Sergei Gorbachov, a sergeant major of the Ukrainian Navy.
- Administrative command – 5 officers.
- Operation command – 17 officers.
- Intelligence command – 8 officers.
- Finance – 6 officers.

==== War in Donbas and Black Sea incidents ====
Following the Revolution of Dignity and the annexation of Crimea, Pro-Russian separatists in Donetsk and Luhansk Oblasts demanded independence from the rest of Ukraine, resulting in the war in Donbas. Some coast guard forces that were stationed in Crimea relocated to Mariupol, where they resumed patrolling the national border. Separatists have been active in the Azov Sea, which has caused incidents with the coast guard.

Special Purpose units of the navy are reported to have taken part in combat against the separatists. On 18 August 2014, Alex Zinchenko of the 73rd Naval Center of Special Operations was the first member of the Ukrainian Navy killed during the war in Donbas while conducting an operation near Donetsk.

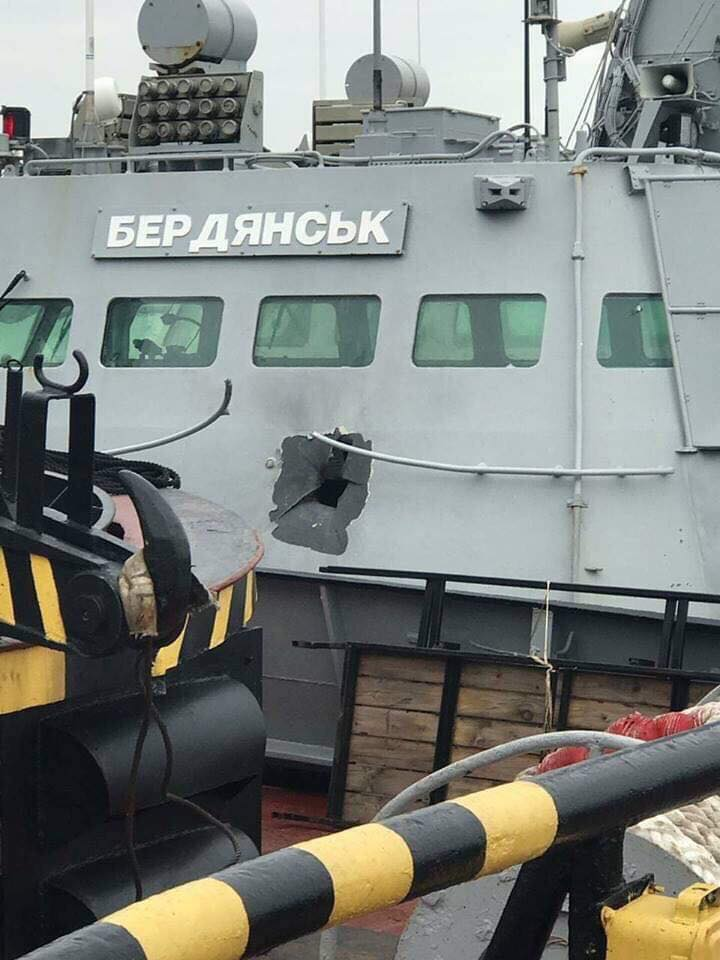
Captured BK-02 Berdiansk with a hole in the pilothouse

On 27 January 2017, the Ukrainian diving support vessel Pochaiv was hit by sniper fire from the Tavrida drilling platform, operated by Chernomorneftegaz, seized by Russian forces in 2014.

On 1 February 2017, a Ukrainian Navy An-26 transport aircraft came under small arms fire from Russian military personnel, stationed on a drill rig, while flying over the Odesa gas field in the Black Sea. This gas field is located within Ukraine's exclusive economic zone, not off the Crimean peninsula, which is also part of Ukraine's EEZ. While the rig in question has not been named, it was amongst those captured by Russian forces in the aftermath of the annexation of Crimea. According to the Ukrainian military, the plane was on a training flight and was hit by small caliber shells.

On 25 November 2018 three Ukrainian navy vessels who attempted to redeploy from the Black Sea port Odesa to the Azov Sea port of Berdiansk were damaged and captured by the Russian FSB security service during the Kerch Strait incident.

During the summer of 2019, Russia issued a number of temporary closures, potentially interrupting navigation and nearly blocking international shipping to and from Georgia, Bulgaria, Romania and Ukraine. Since 25 July 2009, the Russia closures – announced for varying dates and timeframes – covered a total of off 120 thousand square kilometers—nearly 25 percent of the entire Black Sea surface.

In August 2019, the crew of the Ukrainian Navy small reconnaissance ship Pereyaslav, during their trip to Georgia to participate in exercise Agile Spirit 2019 and while in neutral waters, received a warning over the radio from a Russian navy ship. The Russians warned that the Ukrainians needed to turn away because the area was allegedly blocked. International coordinators did not confirm that fact, so the captain of the Pereyaslav decided to maintain the vessel along its original course. Soon thereafter, the Kasimov, a large Russian anti-submarine corvette, Project 1124M/Grisha V-class, was spotted near the Ukrainian ship. The Russian corvette's aggressive behavior only ceased when a Turkish reconnaissance plane arrived close to the Pereyaslav.

On 14 November 2019, during the Third International Conference for Maritime Security, in Odesa, Ukrainian Navy commander Admiral Ihor Voronchenko said that a Russian Tu-22M3 had been observed simulating the launch of a missile strike on this coastal city, Voronchenko added that Russian bombers had made several similar attempts during exercises on 10 July, conducting a virtual airstrike 60 kilometers from Odesa.

The navy was highly affected by the seizure of Crimea by Russia in 2014. At the time of the Russian invasion, the majority of Ukraine's naval vessels were docked in Crimea. Ukraine developed plans to rebuild their naval capability even before 2014 by planning to build 4–10 new corvettes at the Mykolaiv Shipyard. This was one of the Soviet Union's largest shipyards and it built Russia's only and China's first operational aircraft carriers. After the 2014 Crimean status referendum, Ukraine refused to import arms from Russia for its newly-constructed ships. Thus, it is unclear whether weapons for project 58250 (as Ukraine dubbed it) will be built internally in Ukraine or imported from another country.

In 2015, Ukraine received five small (7-and-11-metre (23 and 36 ft)) aluminum Willard Marine patrol boats; the original order was placed in 2013.

In mid 2014, the construction of Gyurza-M-class artillery boats was revived and the first two vessels were expected to be completed in late 2015. In December 2016 the first two Gurza-M artillery boats officially joined the Ukrainian Navy. A new military contract was signed for 20 vessels that should be completed by 2020.

On 27 September 2018, the former United States Coast Guard ships Drummond and Cushing were formally transferred to Ukraine after their retirement from US service. The two vessels were shipped, as deck cargo, and arrived in Odesa on 21 October 2019. The Ukrainian salvage ship Oleksandr Okhrimenko was formally transferred to the Ukrainian Navy from the Ministry of Infrastructure on 29 August 2019.

The Project 58181 Centaur (Kentavr)//Project 58503 Centaur-LK class is a series of small armored assault craft being built for the Ukrainian Navy. The first two vessels were laid down at the Kuznya na Rybalskomu in December 2016. The project was developed by State Research and Design Shipbuilding Center on the basis of the Gyurza-M-class artillery boats. They are designed for patrol service on rivers and coastal maritime areas, the delivery and landing of marines. Two ships on trial, one on order.

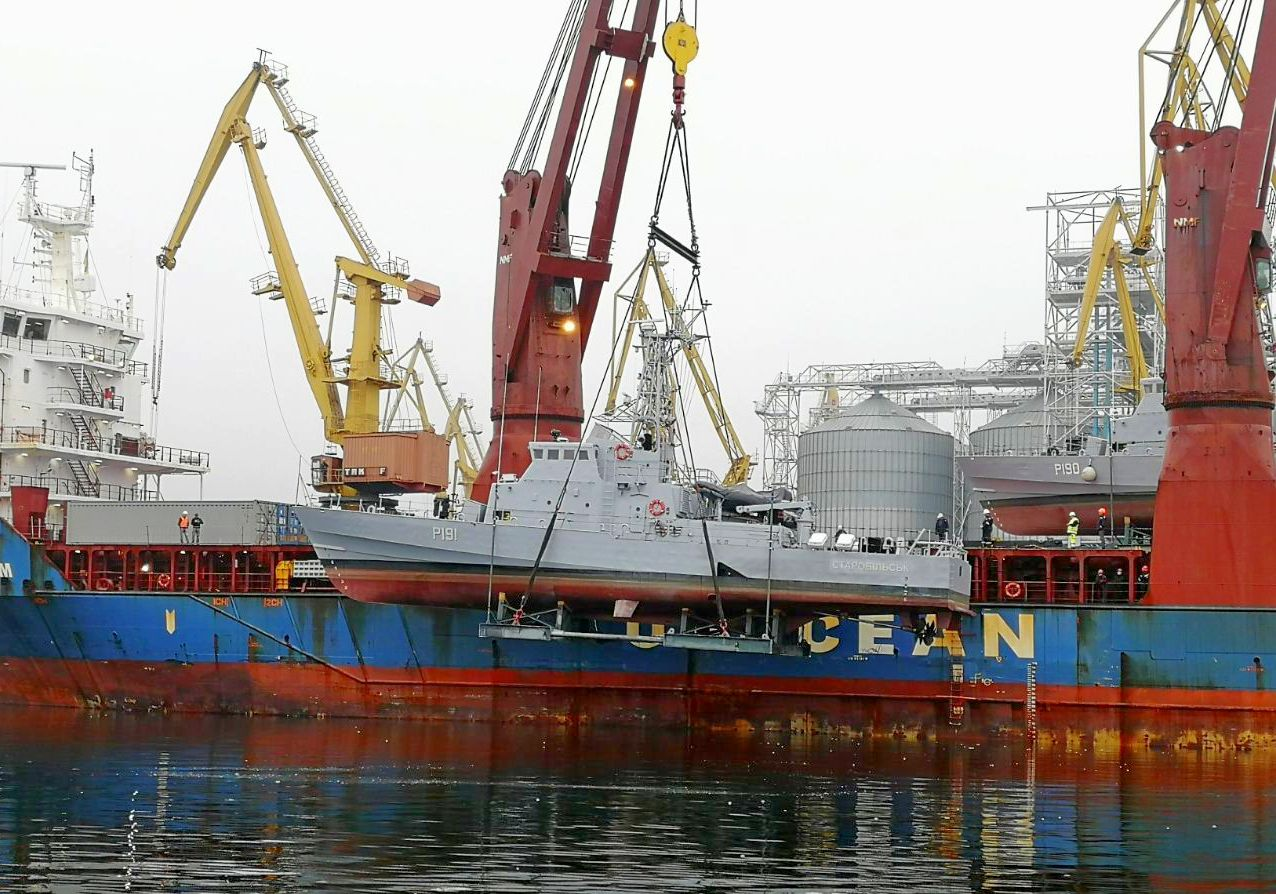
Unloading (the former U.S. Coast Guard) boat Starobilsk in Odesa in October 2019

In 2018 the United States offered Ukraine some of its Oliver Hazard Perry-class frigates from its reserve fleet. The details of this offer were being worked out as of October 2018.

Ukrainian shipbuilder Kuznya na Rybalskomu launched a new medium reconnaissance ship Lahuna for the Ukrainian Navy on 23 April 2019. On 20 October 2019, the unfinished ship arrived in Odesa for completion and commissioning.

The US State Department approved a Foreign Military Sales case for the supply of up to 16 Mark VI patrol boats and associated equipment to Ukraine in June 2020. 12 boats out of the 16 approved for sale has been ordered as of January 2022 and the Ukrainian President (Volodymyr Zelensky) has said that deliveries of the Mark VI patrol boats to Ukraine will begin in 2022.

In October 2020 Ukraine and the United Kingdom signed a memorandum in which the UK government pledged to provide a 10-year loan of up to £1.25 billion ($1.6 billion) for the re-equipment of the Ukrainian Navy. In June 2021, during a visit by HMS Defender to Odesa, it was revealed that an agreement had been reached for two Sandown-class minehunters to be transferred to the Ukrainian Navy upon decommissioning from the Royal Navy.

In December 2020, Ukraine signed an agreement for the production of four Ada-class corvettes. Ukraine is developing a supersonic cruise missile named Bliskavka to arm its warships.

The Ukrainian Navy received its first complex of Bayraktar Tactical Block 2 drones on 15 July 2021.

==== Russian invasion of Ukraine ====
In late February or early March 2022 the Ukrainian frigate Hetman Sahaidachny was scuttled in the port of Mykolaiv to prevent its capture by Russian forces. On March 3 the patrol boat Slavyansk was sunk by an anti-ship missile of Russian naval aviation.

On March 14, the Russian source RT reported that the Russian Armed Forces had captured about a dozen Ukrainian ships in Berdiansk. The vessels reported as captured included two Gyurza-M-class artillery vessels (including the vessel Akkerman), the Matka-class missile boat Pryluky, a Project 1124P (Grisha II)-class corvette (the Vinnytsia, a museum ship), a Zhuk-class patrol boat, a Yevgenya-class minesweeper, the Polnocny-class landing ship Yuri Olefirenko and a Ondatra-class landing craft. Independent confirmation of these captures was secured except for those of the Pryluky, the Grisha, the Yevgenya, the Yuri Olefirenko and the Ondatra. In addition, independent confirmation of the capture of another Zhuk-class patrol boat and 6 small boats was secured. These smaller boats were one Adamant 315-class motor yacht, 3 Kalkan-M-class small patrol boats and 2 UMS 1000-class small patrol boats.

The Naval Infantry has fought in the current conflict, contributing forces to some of the major land battles of the war, especially in the south.

On June 3, 2022, the landing ship Yuri Olefirenko was seen under Ukrainian control near Ochakiv (between Mykolaiv and Odesa) after being targeted by Russian artillery. Rounds landed within 200 ft of the ship but caused no damage. Russia claimed to have captured the ship in Berdiansk early into the conflict.

On June 22, 2022, the BBC published a report showing Royal Navy personnel training Ukrainian Navy personnel on two former Royal Navy Sandown Class Minehunters. The two ships ex-HMS Blyth and ex-HMS Ramsey were offered to Ukraine in 2021. However, in October 2022 it was reported that both ships would be transferred to the Romanian Navy instead. HMS Shoreham was also supposed to be handed over to the Ukrainian Navy.

The Marine Corps, which also fought during the ongoing invasion and was well known internationally for the famous last stand of one of its brigades in Mariupol, was officially separated from the Navy and made an independent service of the Armed Forces of Ukraine effective 23 May 2023.

== Organisation ==
=== Current role ===
The Navy is tasked with the defense of the sovereignty and state interests of Ukraine at sea and in riverine axes. They are required to neutralize enemy naval groups in their operational zones both alone and with other branches of the Armed Forces of Ukraine, and to provide assistance from the sea to the Marine Corps, Unmanned Systems Forces and the Ground Forces during the conduct of their military and non-military operations, as well as with the other uniformed organizations as mandated by the Constitution and laws of the republic. The main missions assigned to the Navy are as follows:

- creation and maintenance of combat forces on a level sufficient to deter maritime and riverine aggression;
- neutralization of enemy naval forces within maritime and inland waters either with other elements of the AFU or by its own personnel;
- destruction of enemy transportation both at sea and the major rivers of Ukraine;
- support of the landing of amphibious elements of the Marine Corps and Ground Forces and other uniformed organizations and fight against enemy amphibious forces alongside other elements of the Armed Forces or on its own actions;
- maintenance of a beneficial operational regime in the operational maritime and riverine zones;
- defense of its bases and sea lines of communications;
- cooperation in coastal defense activities with elements of the Marine Corps and Ground Forces and other uniformed organizations;
- protection of submarine space within territorial sea waters;
- protection of the merchant fleet, maritime oil and gas industries, and other state maritime activities mandated by the Constitution and legislative acts of the Supreme Council;
- assistance to the Marine Corps, Unmanned Systems Forces and Ground Forces in their conduct of operations (military actions) along maritime and riverine axes as well as with other uniformed organizations of the nation;
- and participation in peacekeeping operations overseas in support of UNSC mandates.

=== Bases ===
The headquarters and Main Naval Base of the Ukrainian Navy were located in Sevastopol in Striletska Bay within the Bay of Sevastopol. This was also the main base of the Black Sea Fleet of the Russian Navy. Since February–March 2014 Ukrainian Naval Forces are headquartered in Odesa and based in ports in mainland Ukraine.

Other naval bases

- Western Naval Base in Odesa
- Southern Naval Base in Mykolaiv (mooring place in Ochakiv)
- Azov Naval Base, in Berdiansk (mooring places in Henichesk and Mariupol, late September 2018 two Ukrainian vessels departed from Odesa, passed the Crimean Bridge and arrived Mariupol) (occupied by Russians)
- Southern Naval Base in Crimea at: Novoozerne, Yevpatoria in Donuzlav Lake) (occupied by Russians)

== Structure ==
The branch is designed to protect the sovereignty of Ukraine at sea. The forces were highly affected by the Russian annexation of Crimea, because the majority of Naval Forces were stationed there.

Aviation

- 10th Naval Aviation Brigade

Surface Forces

- 1st MCM Ships Division
- 8th Raid Ships Division
- 9th Surface Ships Division
- 21st Fleet Signals Company
- 28th Auxiliary Division
- 29th Surface Ships Division
- 30th Surface Ships Division
- 31st Supply Ships Division
- 385th USV Brigade (OPCON Unmanned Systems Forces)

Riverine Forces

- Dnieper Fleet
  - 26th Naval River Ships Division
  - 27th Naval River Ships Division

Special Forces

- Angels Detachment
- 29th Intelligence Center
- 30th Command and Intelligence Center
- 801st Underwater Special Forces

Rear Elements

- Center for Combat Support
- 37th Communications Regiment
- 84th Weapon Storage Unit

Educational Institutions

- Naval High School
- 198th Naval Basic Training Center
- 203rd Naval Training Center

== Equipment ==
=== Ships ===
The Ukrainian Navy inherited a large number of warships from the Black Sea Fleet following the Dissolution of the Soviet Union. Following the loss of the majority of its Soviet-era fleet as a result of the 2014 Russian annexation of Crimea, a mosquito fleet strategy was adopted, prioritising fast patrol boats and unmanned systems. By 2021, only a small number of blue-water ships remained in service, such as the frigate Hetman Sahaidachny and the landing ship Yuri Olefirenko. Due to the loss of its blue-water naval capabilities, it is often erroneously claimed that Ukraine 'does not have a navy.'

Several ships were additionally lost in combat throughout the Russo-Ukrainian war, with replacement capabilities focused on asymmetric counterforce in the form of unmanned surface vehicles and coastal defence.

==== Coastal and fast patrol ====
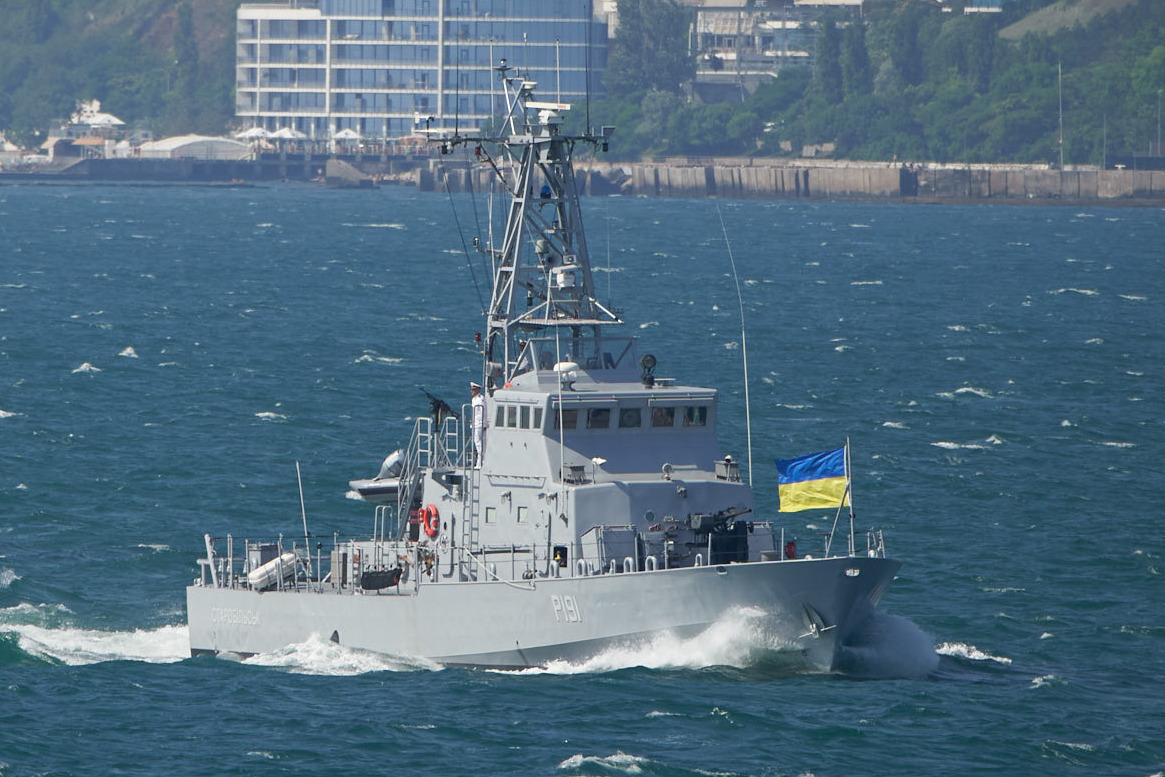
Island-class patrol boat Starobilsk in Odessa, 2020

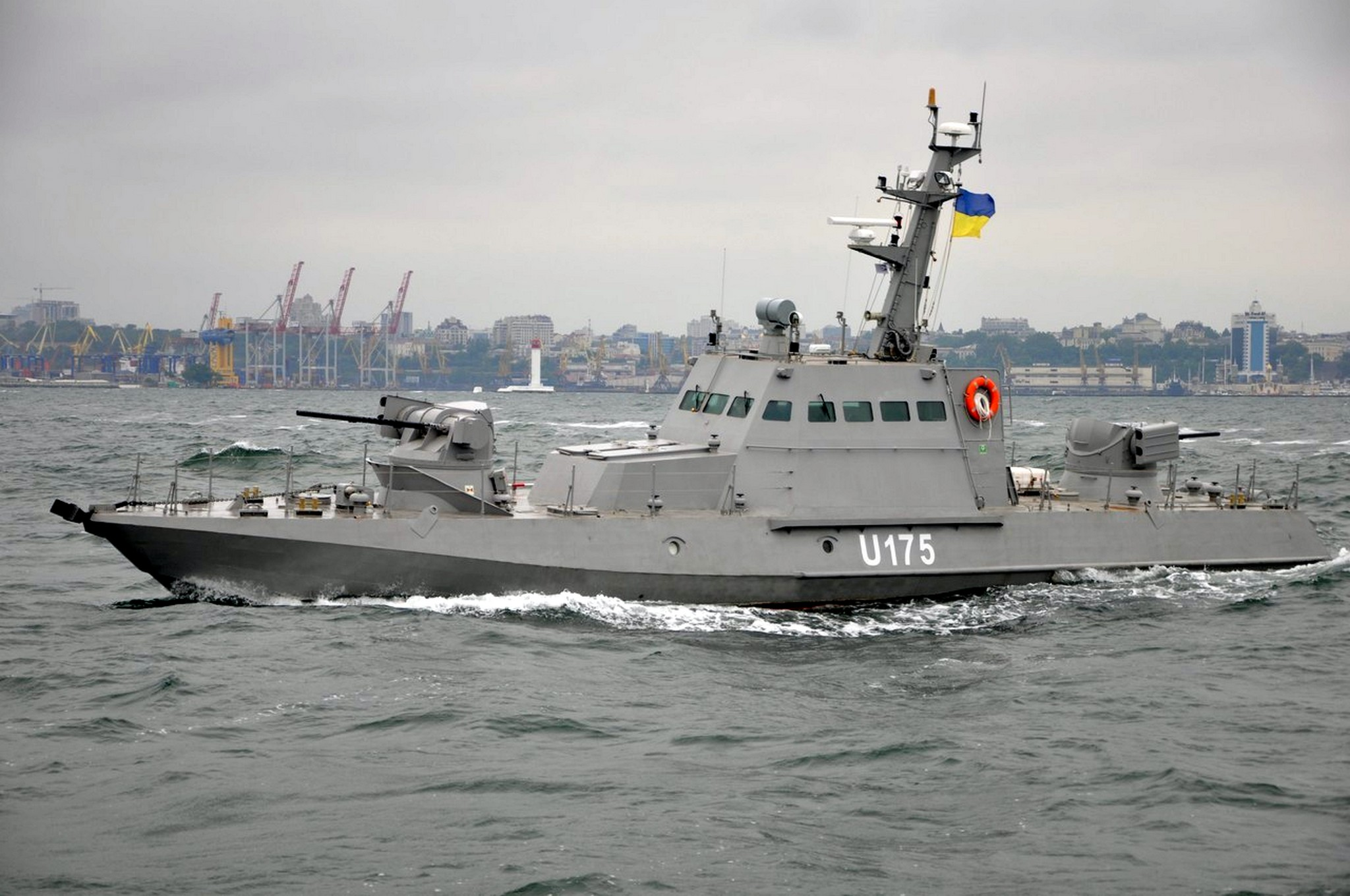
Gyurza-M-class gunboat Berdyansk in Odessa, 2017

The patrol force primarily consists of three Island-class patrol boats, four Project 58155 Gyurza-M gunboats. The majority of these ships are based in Odessa and are responsible for the interception of unmanned aerial vehicles and unmanned surface vessels, in addition to their peacetime role as littoral coastal patrol vessels. This force is complemented by two NAVY 18 WP-class patrol boats as well as a number of smaller vessels. The Gyurza-M class gunboat Bucha is a part of the Dnieper Flotilla and forms a part of the air-defence network of Kyiv.

- 3 Island-class patrol boats (Starobilsk, Sumy, Fastiv)
- 4 Gyurza-M-class gunboats (Berdyansk, Nikopol, Kostopil, Bucha)
- 2 NAVY 18 WP-class patrol boats (Irpin, Reni)

A number of miscellaneous patrol craft are also in service, the current status of which is unknown.

==== Mine warfare ====
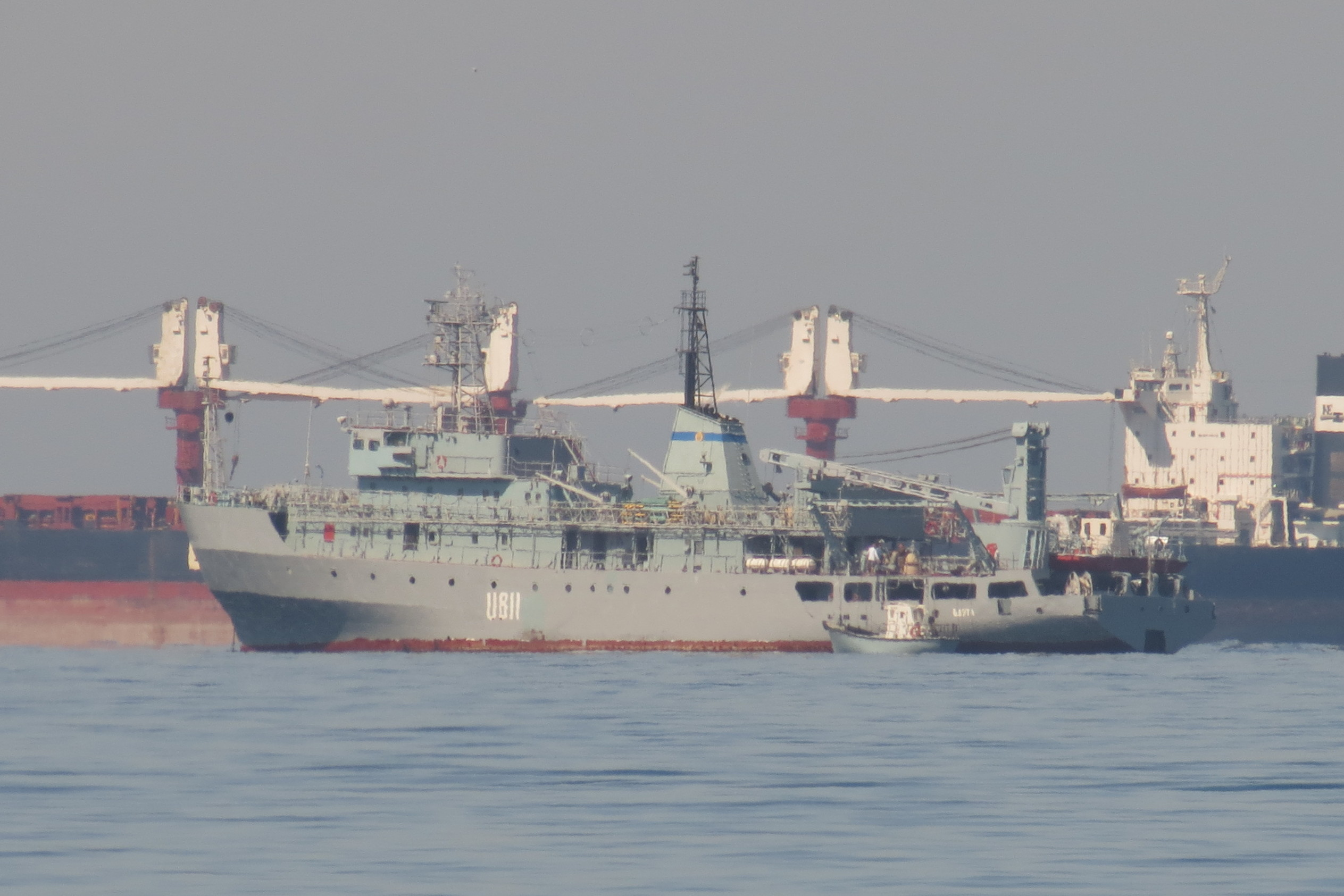
Balta in Sevastopol, 2012

The minehunter force is maintained by the single Bereza-class minehunter Balta based in Odessa. The vessel was inherited from the Black Sea Fleet, in which she initially saw service as a degaussing ship. As the largest vessel by tonnage (auxiliary ships excluded), the ship is the de-facto flagship of the Ukrainian Navy following the loss of Yuri Olefirenko.

- 1 Bereza-class minehunter (Balta)

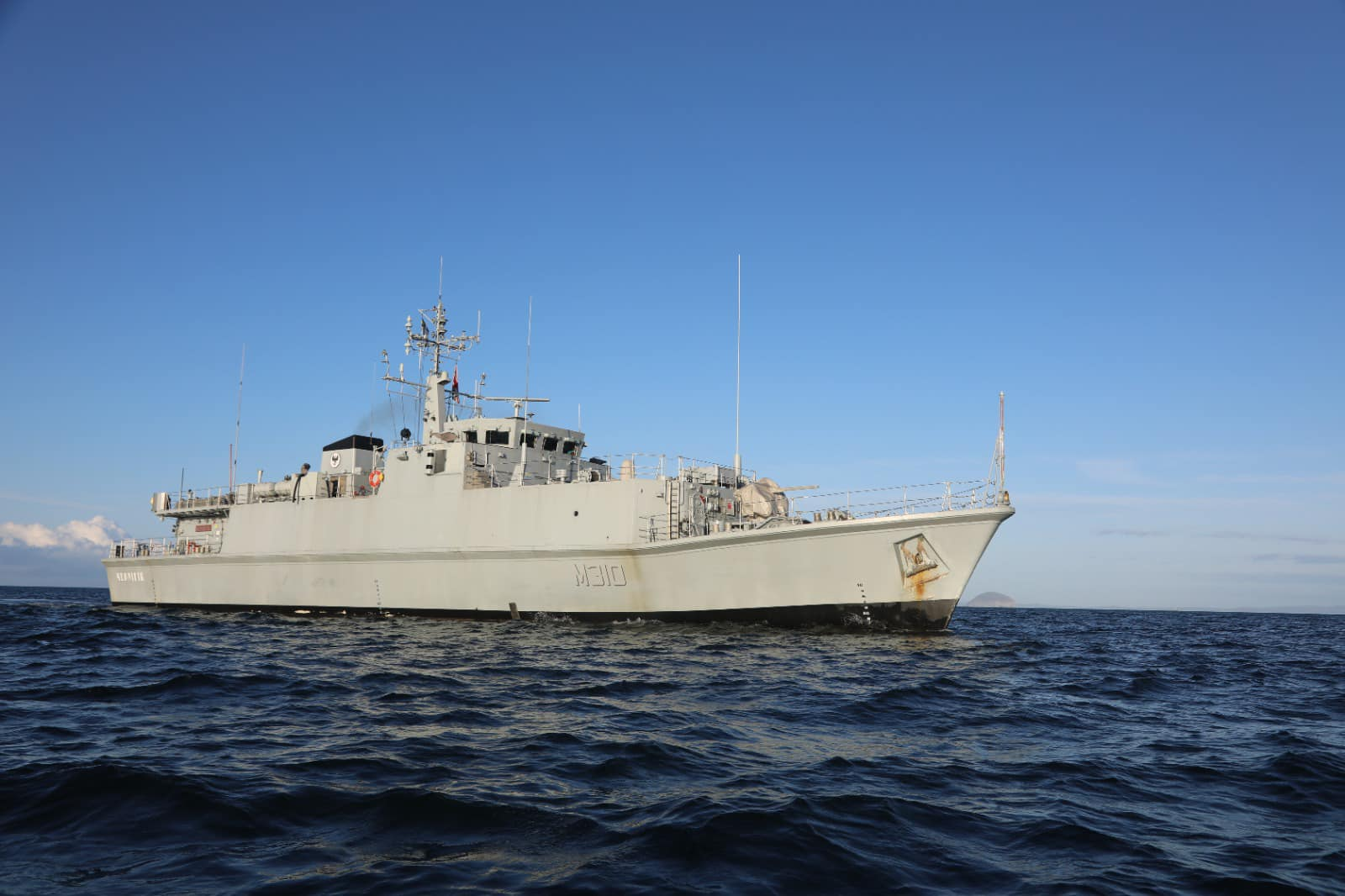
Sandown-class minehunter Chernihiv, 2024

Several minesweepers transferred from the Royal Navy, Royal Netherlands Navy and Belgian Navy are also commissioned in the VMS ZSU. These include the former Royal Navy ships HMS Grimsby and HMS Shoreham, the former Royal Netherlands Navy ships HNLMS Vlaardingen (M863) and HNLMS Makkum (M857), and the former Belgian Navy ship BNS Narcis (M923). However, these vessels remain indefinitely based in the United Kingdom as a result of the Montreux Convention Regarding the Regime of the Straits under contracts with Babcock International.

The transfer of the two Sandown-class minehunters was confirmed as early as June 2021 as part of the Ukrainian Naval Capabilities Enhancement Project (UNCEP) signed with the United Kingdom during the controversial visit of HMS Defender to the Black Sea in 2021.

- 2 Sandown-class minehunters (Chernihiv, Cherkasy)
- 3 Tripartite-class minehunters (Melitopol, Mariupol, Henichensk)

==== Amphibious warfare ====
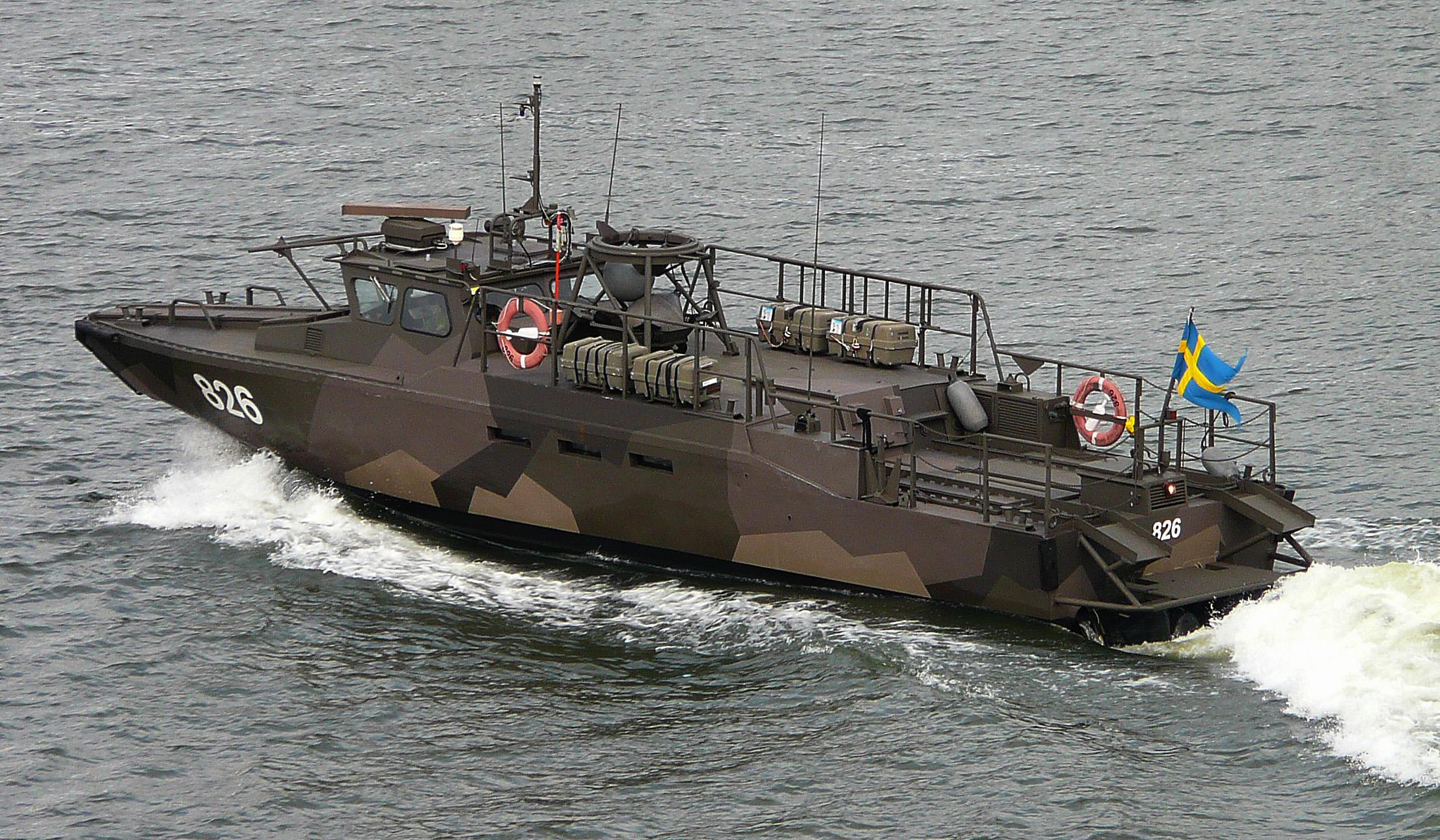
CB90-class fast assault craft (representative)

The amphibious warfare force consists of the single Centaur-class fast attack craft Malyn as well as an unspecified number CB90-class assault boats. A total of 38 CB90-class fast assault craft have been pledged.

The Centaur-class boats failed to pass state tests on 6 February 2022, but were accepted into emergency service in April 2022.

An unspecified number of Uisko-class landing craft and a single SHERP the Shuttle are also in service. The Uisko-class landing craft were transferred from the Finnish Navy via Romania as a result of their pending replacement with the Jurmo-class landing craft.

==== Auxiliary fleet ====
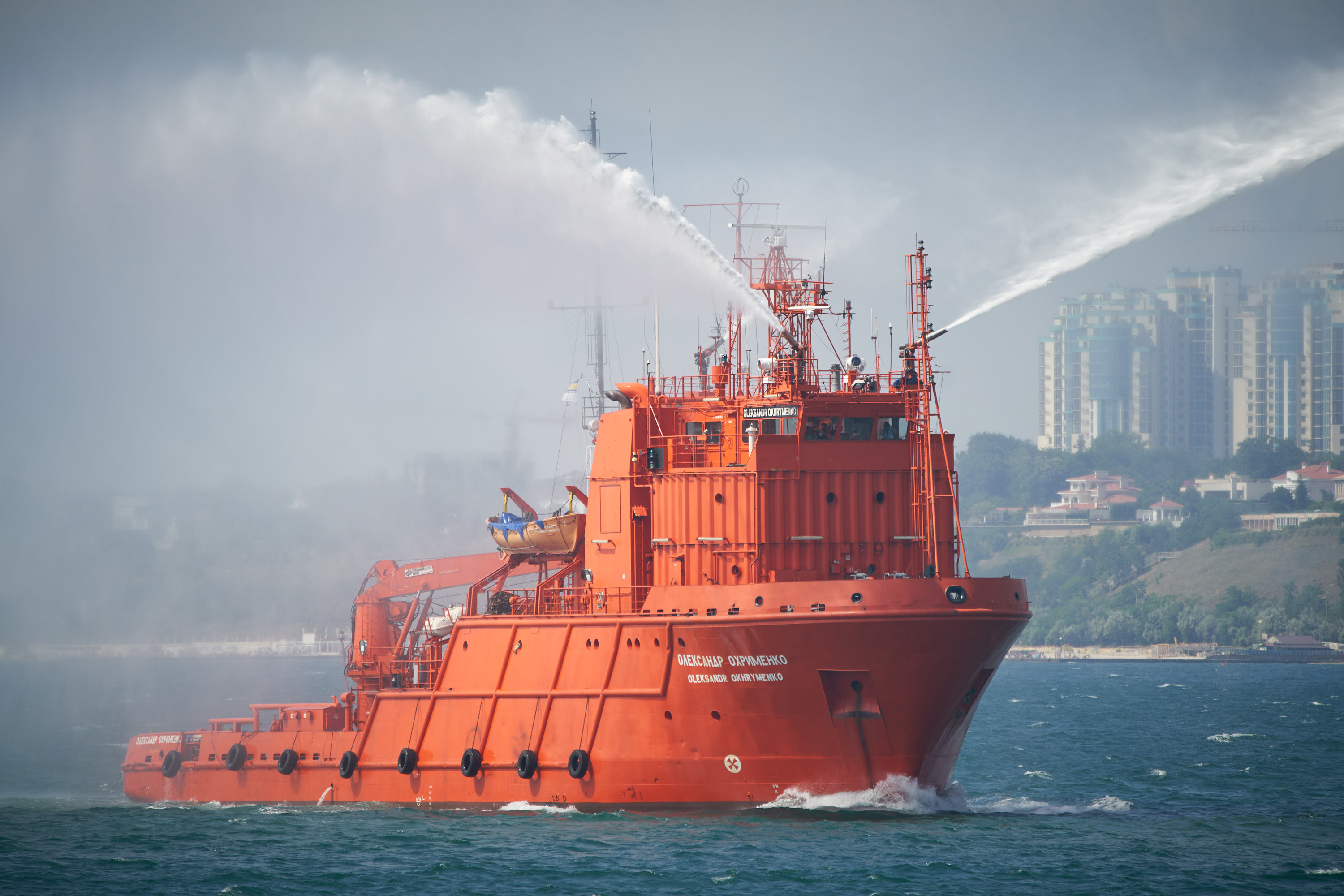
Search and rescue vessel Oleksandr Okhrimenko in Odesa, 2020

A large number of auxiliary vessels were inherited from the Black Sea Fleet. Today, all auxiliary vessels in service remain of Soviet origin. Due to the significant age of the remaining fleet, as well as the forces naval activity largely limited to the littoral zone of the Black Sea, the operational condition of the fleet remains largely unknown.

Notable ships in the auxiliary fleet include the spy ship Pereyaslav, the search and rescue vessel Oleksandr Okhrimenko, the ambulance vessel Sokal and the Yelva-class diving support vessels Netishyn and Pochaiv.

=== Aircraft ===
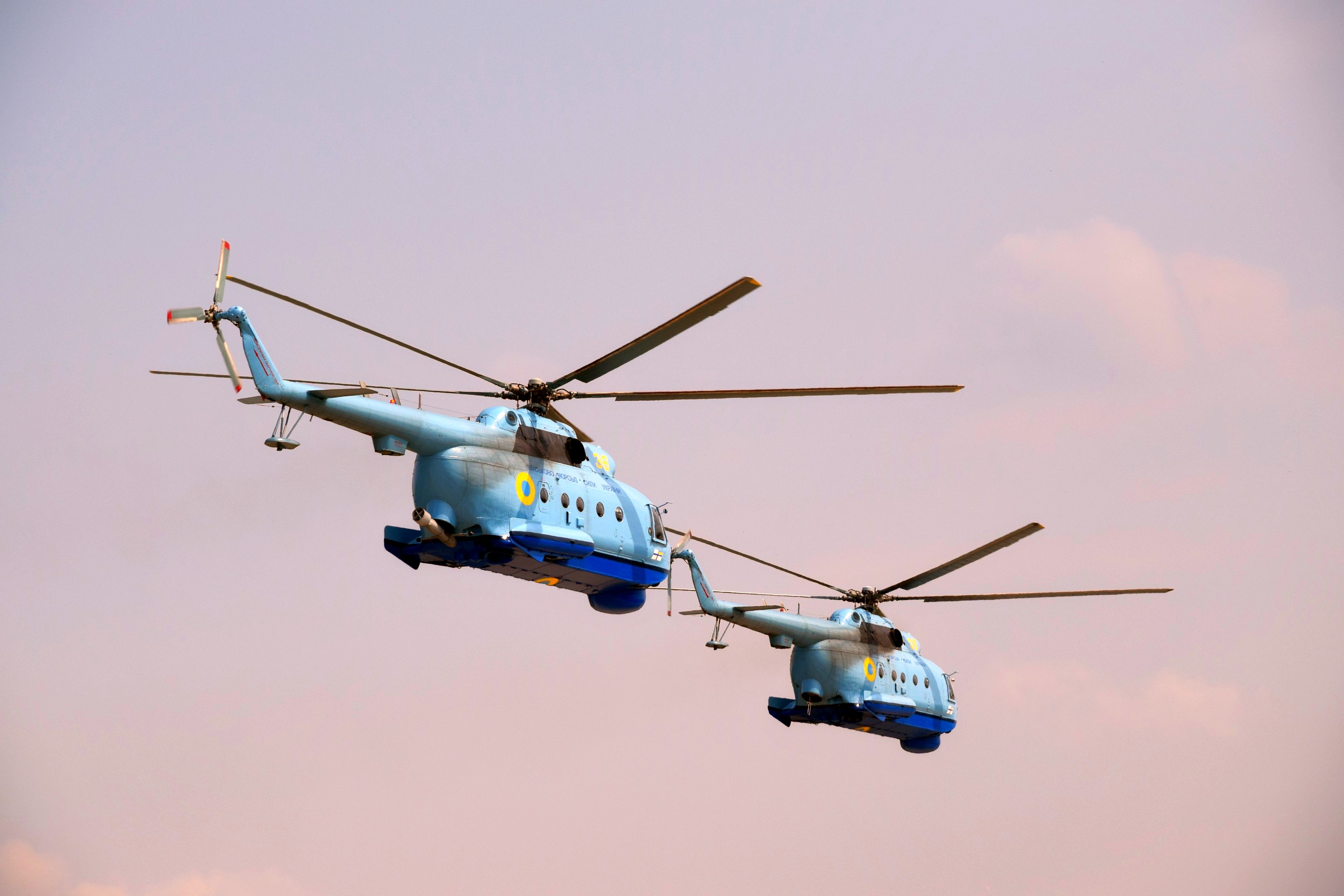
Ukrainian Naval Aviation Mi-14 helicopters during the Exercise Sea Breeze 2018

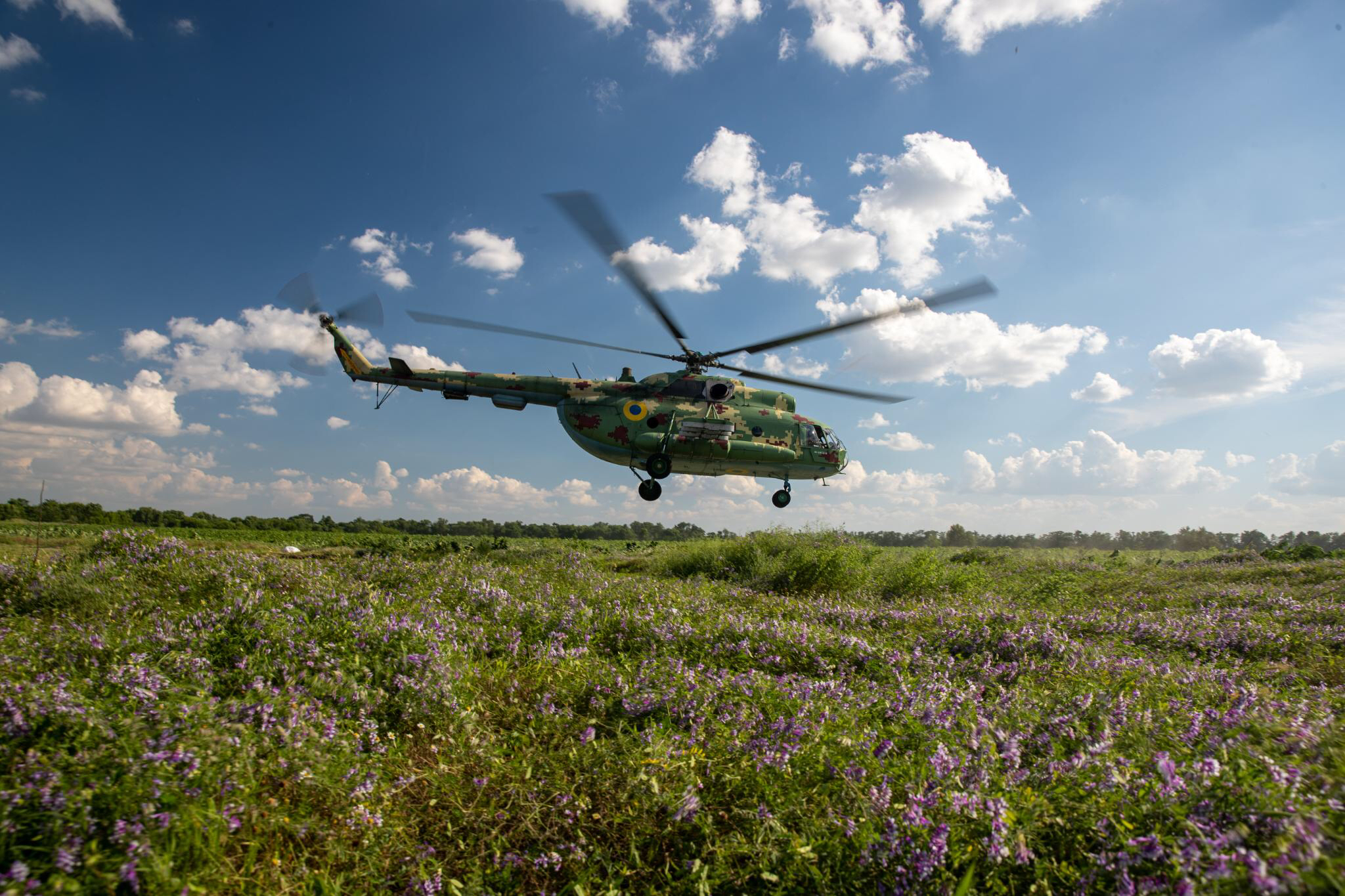
Ukrainian Naval Aviation Mi-8 during the exercise Sea Breeze 2021

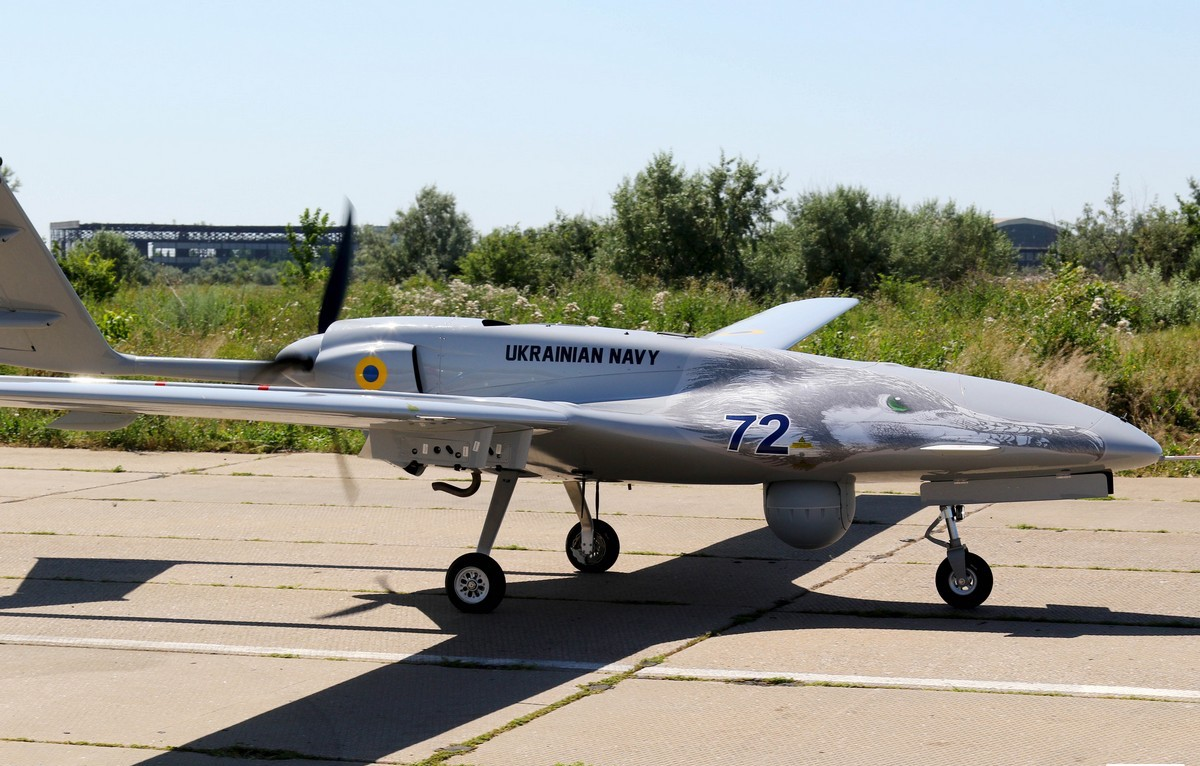
Ukrainian Naval Aviation Bayraktar TB2 at Kulbakino Air Base, 2021

Ukraine inherited significant aviation capabilities from the Soviet Union, including strategic aircraft such as the Tupolev Tu-142, Tupolev Tu-22M. However, these were discarded under the Budapest Memorandum. A large number of aircraft were either decommissioned due to operational and financial reasons, or were transferred to the Ukrainian Air Force. The remaining inventory included transport, attack and anti submarine warfare helicopters, as well as transport aircraft. More aircraft and bases were lost as a result of the 2014 Russian annexation of Crimea. The repair and maintenance of aircraft was further disrupted as a result of worsening relations with Russia.

All aircraft are operated by the 10th Naval Aviation Brigade based at Kulbakino Air Base near Mykolaiv.

In 2021, the Ukrainian Navy received its first batch of Baykar Bayraktar TB2 unmanned combat aerial vehicles.

As of 2026, Ukrainian Naval Aviation operates two Antonov An-26 transport aircraft, supported by two Westland Sea King utility helicopters transferred from HeliOperations formerly operated by the Royal Navy, in addition to an unspecified number of Mil Mi-8 helicopters. An unspecified number of Bayraktar TB2 drones are also in service. Several Mi-14, Ka-27 and Ka-226 helicopters were also formerly in service, but their status remains unknown.

Following the loss of Hetman Sahaidachny, the Ukrainian Navy no longer operates any warships capable of supporting marine helicopter operations. This capability is expected to be restored with the presumed commissioning of the Ada-class corvettes Hetman Ivan Mazepa and Hetman Ivan Vhyovskyi in the future. In late 2021 Rear Admiral Oleksiy Neizhpapa confirmed that the Kamov Ka-27 helicopters in service would be replaced by a "western type".

=== Coastal Defence ===
Under administrative control of the Navy but personnel drawn from both Navy proper and Marine Corps

Name	Image	Origin	Type	Variant	Number	Details
Neptune		Ukraine	Medium range anti-ship missile	RK-360MC	?	In service with the Ukrainian Navy since March 2021. It is believed by both Ukraine and the United States that two of these missiles were used to sink the Russian cruiser Moskva on 13 April 2022, as stated by an official spokesperson for the United States Department of Defense. One coastal defense battalion contains six launchers with four tubes each.
RBS-17		Sweden; United States	Very short range anti-ship missile	Maritime AGM-114 Hellfire variant		In June 2022, Sweden announced supplies of RBS-17 anti-ship missiles based on the maritime AGM-114 Hellfire variant in response to the 2022 Russian invasion of Ukraine.
Harpoon		United States	Medium range anti-ship missile	RGM-84L-4	3+?	Launchers supplied by Denmark in June 2022, with missiles additionally provided by the United Kingdom and the Netherlands in response to the 2022 Russian invasion of Ukraine. United States announced the supply of additional two Harpoon systems the same month.

=== Formerly under the Navy ===
==== Naval Infantry ====
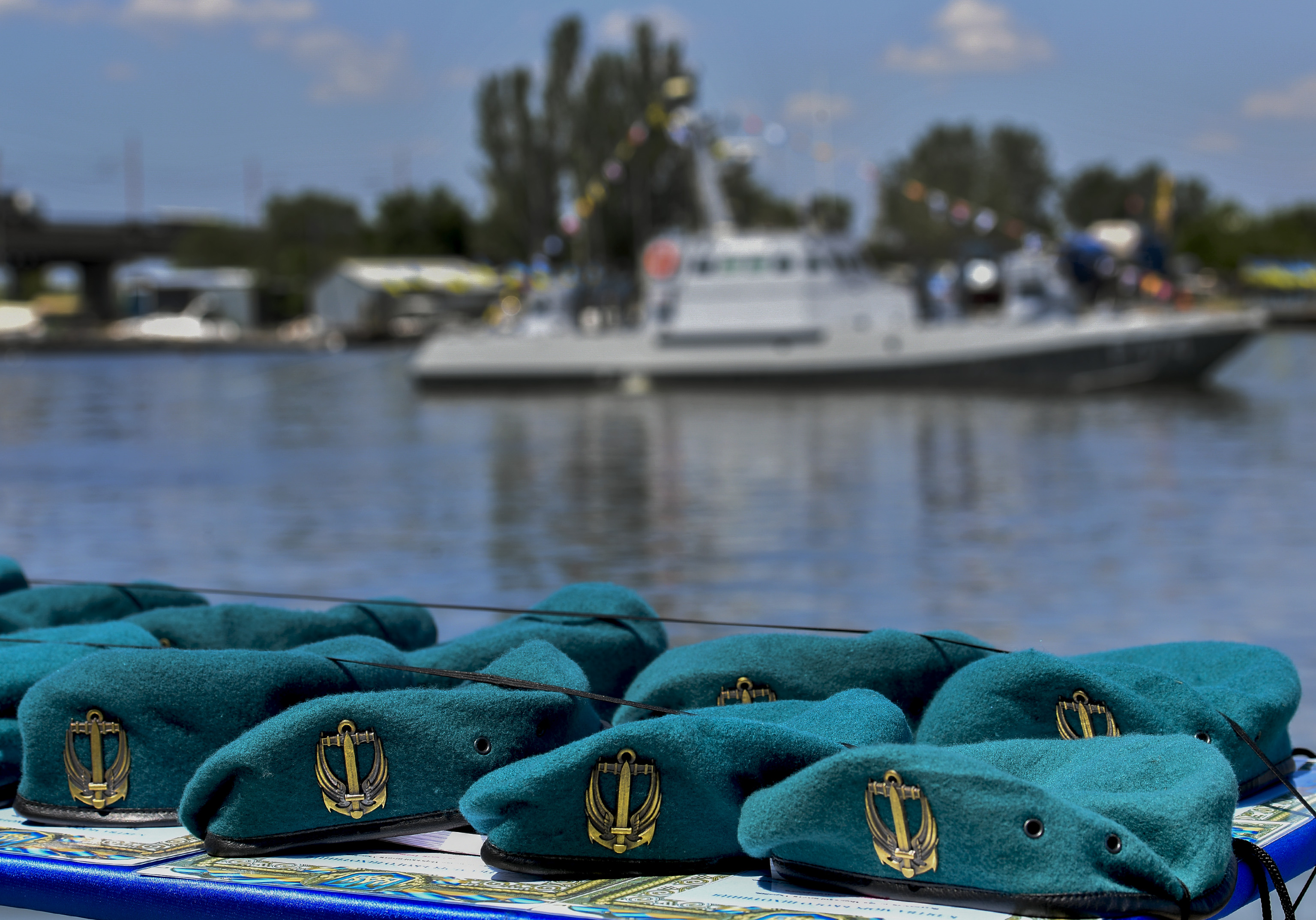
Ukrainian marines' berets

The Ukrainian Marine Corps (Ukrainian: Морська піхота literally means "Naval Infantry") was a long time part of the coastal forces of the Ukrainian Navy when it was raised in 1918 and since its official reactivation in 1993. It was used as a component part of amphibious, airborne and amphibious-airborne operations, alone or in conjunction with formations and units of the Ground Forces in order to capture parts of the seashore, islands, ports, fleet bases, coast airfields and other coastal objects of the enemy. It can also be used to defend naval bases, vital coastal areas and installations, separate islands and coastal facilities and provide security in hostile areas.

Based in Mykolaiv it is organized into a full division with 2 marine brigades (2-4 more are being activated and 1 being transferred from the Ground Forces), 1 coastal artillery brigade and 1 multiple rocket launcher artillery regiment.

The Marine Corps officially separated from the Navy to become a service branch of the Armed Forces of Ukraine on its own right on 23 May 2023, the official Corps Birthday.

== Future ==
Small boats drones, mines and anti-ship missiles were used in 2023 and might be in future.

Ukraine might also take delivery of 2 Ada-class corvettes under construction in Turkey. The Ukrainian corvette Hetman Ivan Mazepa is undergoing sea trials as of 2023. Ivan Mazepa is slated to become the flagship of the Ukrainian Navy. The ship was officially laid down on 7 September 2021, and launched on 2 October 2022. When completed, the vessel will be the flagship of the Ukrainian Navy, and will be the first modern combat vessel of the service.

== External links and further reading ==
- Jane's Navy International, Interview: Admiral Viktor Maksymov, C.-in-C., Ukraine Navy, JNI December 2010, 34.
- Ukrainian Navy: ferial excursions into the past and present
- Interview of Borys Kozhyn. Magazine "Hetman". #1 (24) 2009.
- (in English and Ukrainian) Navy page on the official site of the Ministry of Defence: in English, in Ukrainian
- (in English and Ukrainian) Ukrainian Navy Website: in English, in Ukrainian
- World Navies Today: Ukraine (full unofficial list of vessels with descriptions, as of March 2002; no images)
- (in Russian) Photogallery of Ukrainian Navy vessels (most vessels available, with pennant numbers, no detailed descriptions)
