= Russian gunboat Nayezdnik =

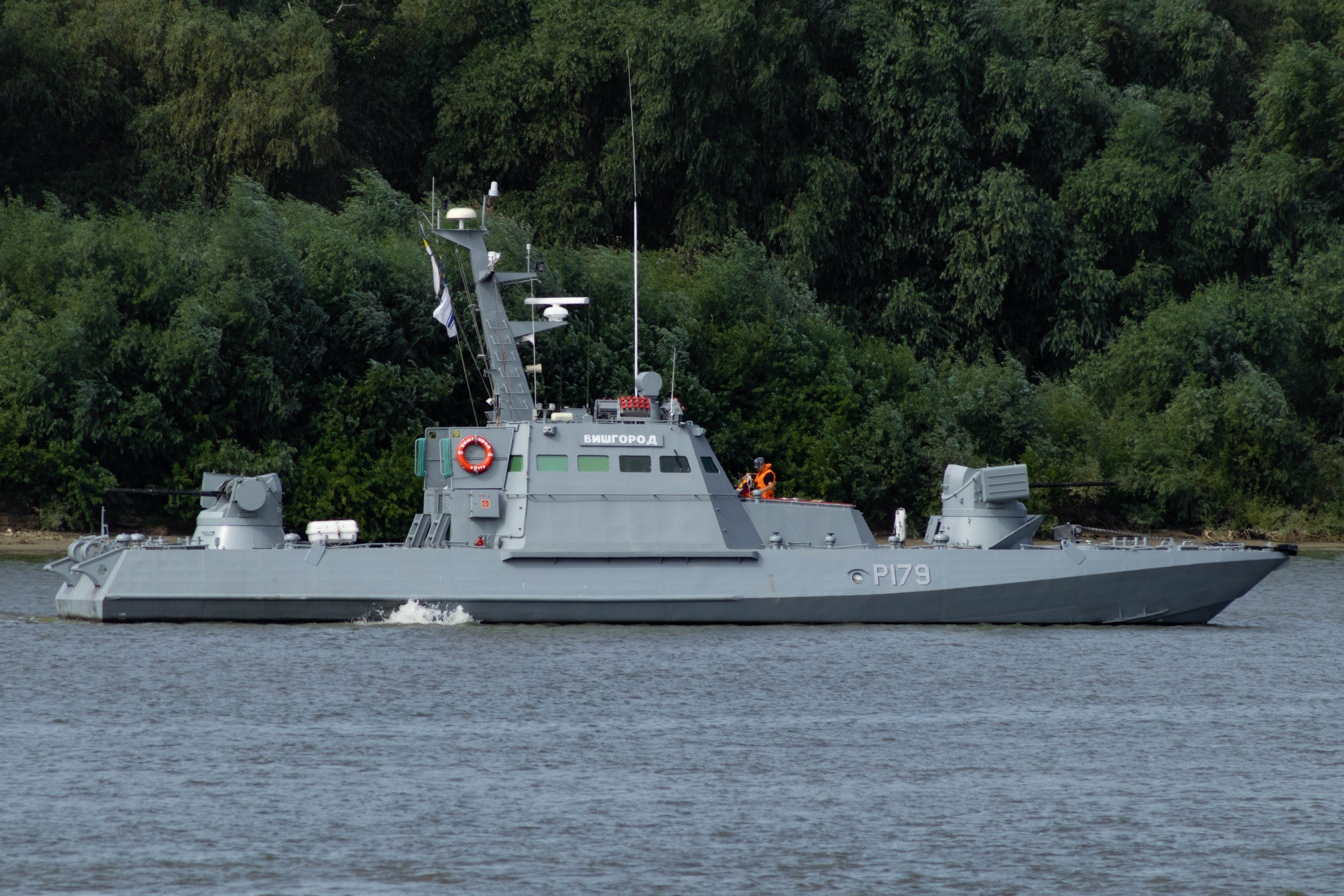
- Vyshhorod in Ukrainian service

History

Ukraine
- Name: Vyshhorod
- Namesake: Vyshhorod
- Builder: Kuznia na Rybalskomu, Kyiv, Ukraine
- Laid down: 7 April 2016
- Launched: 24 June 2017
- Commissioned: 1 July 2018
- Home port: Odessa (2018–2020), Berdyansk (2020–2022)
- Identification: U179 (2018), P179 (2018–2022)
- Captured: 28 February 2022
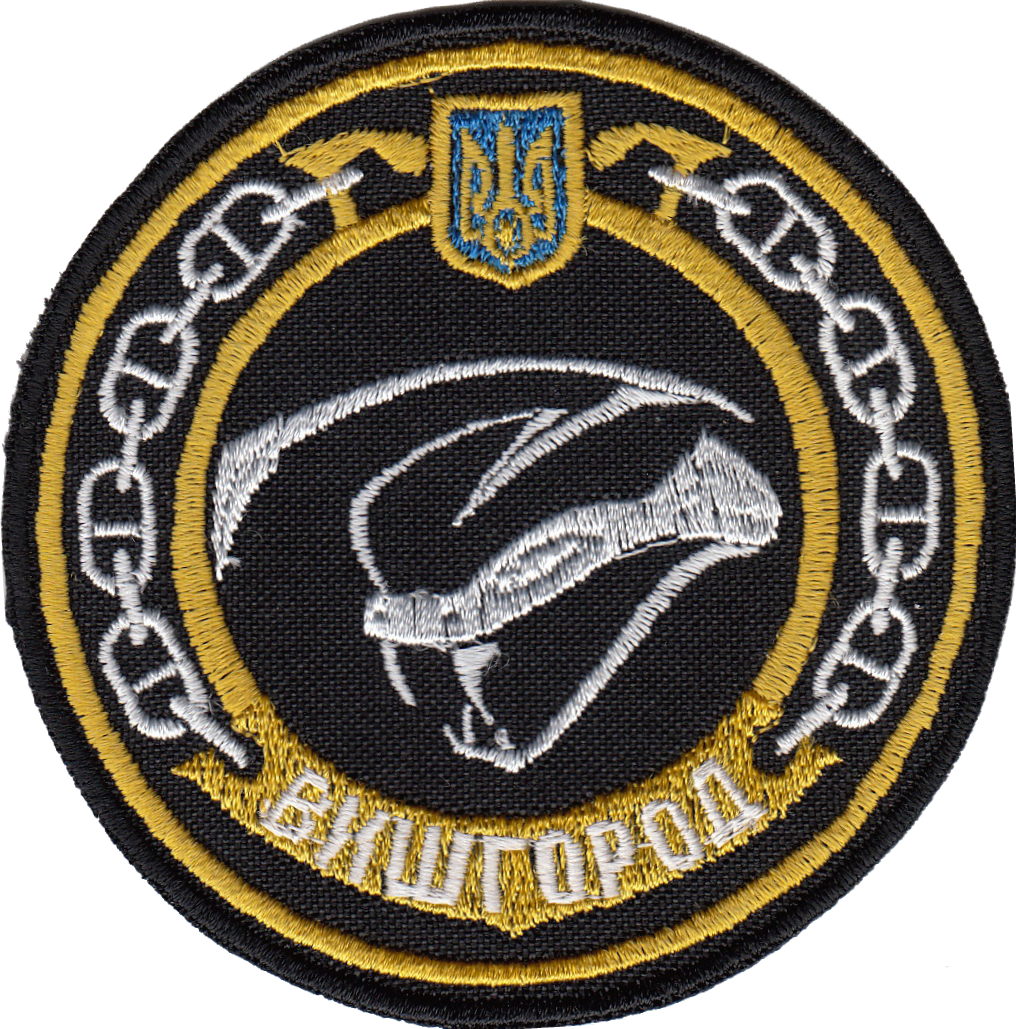
- Badge

Russia
- Name: Nayezdnik
- Namesake: Nayezdnik (1878)
- Acquired: 28 February 2022, by capture
- Home port: Sevastopol
- Status: Active

General characteristics
- Class & type: Gyurza-M-class gunboat
- Displacement: 54 tons
- Length: 23.0 m (75 ft 6 in)
- Beam: 4.8 m (15 ft 9 in)
- Draught: 1.0 m (3 ft 3 in)
- Propulsion: 2 × Caterpillar C18 ACERT marine diesel engines producing 1,125 hp (839 kW) each
- Speed: 25 knots (46 km/h; 29 mph)
- Range: 900 nmi (1,700 km; 1,000 mi) at 12 knots (22 km/h; 14 mph)
- Complement: 5
- Armament: Guns and missiles: Ukraine; 2 × KMDB BM-5M.01 'Katran-M'; 1 × ZTM-1 (Shipunov 2A42) 30 mm autocannon; 1 × KBA-117 (AGS-17 30 mm grenade launcher; 1 × KM-7.62 PK 7.62×54mm machine gun; 2 × Luch Barrier ATGM (for but not with); 9K38 Igla MANPADS; Russia; 2 × Tulamashzavod 2M-3M twin-barreled 25 mm autocannon; 9K338 Igla-S or 9K333 Verba MANPADS; Mine warfare: Mines

Nayezdnik (Russian: Наездник, lit. 'Horseman') is a Project 58155 littoral gunboat operated by the Black Sea Fleet of the Russian Navy, previously the Ukrainian Navy vessel Vyshhorod (P179), which was seized at the Port of Berdyansk, following the capture of the city of Berdyansk.

== Development ==
The Project 58155 armoured boat "Gyurza-M" is intended for coastal and riverine patrol, developed by the State Research and Design Shipbuilding Center based in Mykolaiv, as a follow on to the Gyurza-class gunboat. It is larger than its predecessor, with a displacement of 54 tons, length of 23 metres, a width of 4.8 meters and a draft of 1 meter. The vessel is equipped with two BM-5M.01 Katran-M turrets, a variant of the BM-3 Shturm turret used on the BTR-3.

Following the loss of the majority of its major surface vessels as a result of the Russian annexation of Crimea, the class was considered a key priority by the Ukrainian Navy, in the development of a "mosquito fleet".

== Operational history ==
=== Russia ===
On 28 February 2022, Vyshhorod, as well as Akkerman were captured by Russian forces after it was abandoned at the Port of Berdyansk. The two ships were moved to Novorossiysk in April 2022. In May 2022, the vessel was commissioned into the Black Sea Fleet at Sevastopol, under the new name Nayezdnik, taking the name from the clipper Nayezdnik of 1878.

In 2023, the vessels two BM-5M.01 Katran-M turrets were removed and replaced with two twin-barrel 25 mm 2M-3M autocannon mounts, in common with Russian Project 1204 Schmel gunboats in operation. When in Ukrainian service, Barrier ATGM modules for the turrets had never been integrated due to the lack of a suitable fire control system. The primary dues of the vessel would reportedly be to conduct anti unmanned surface vehicle patrols.

Nayezdnik underwent a minor refit in 2025, receiving a new gray splinter pattern camouflage.

== See also ==
- Russian gunboat Razboynik
