= Russian gunboat Razboynik =

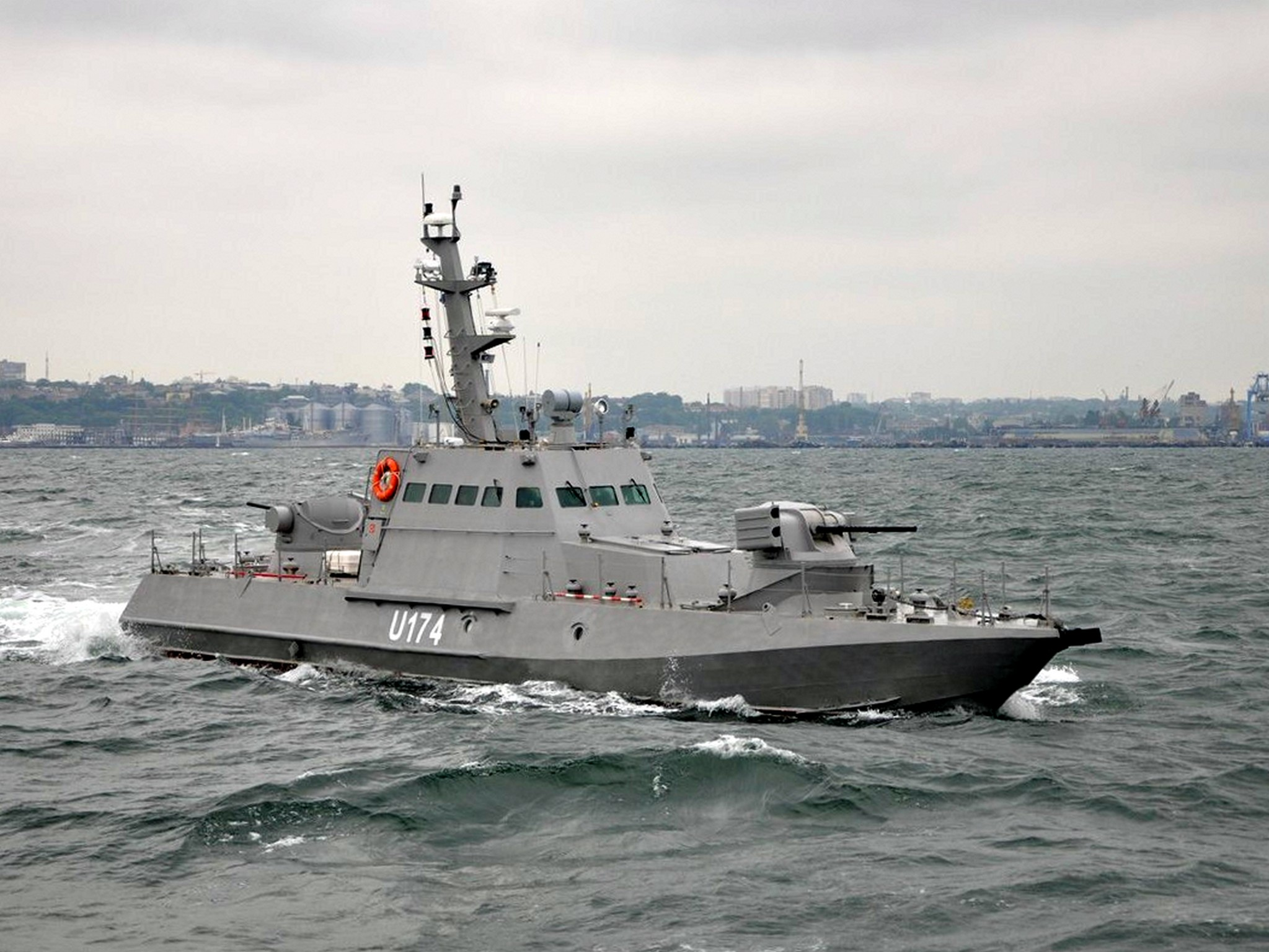
- Akkerman when under Ukrainian service.

History

Ukraine
- Name: Akkerman
- Namesake: Akkerman
- Ordered: 2012
- Builder: Leninska Kuznia, Kyiv, Ukraine
- Laid down: 25 October 2012
- Launched: 11 November 2015
- Commissioned: 6 December 2016
- Home port: Odessa (2016–2020), Berdyansk (2020–2022)
- Identification: U174 (2016–2018), P174 (2018–2022)
- Captured: 28 February 2022
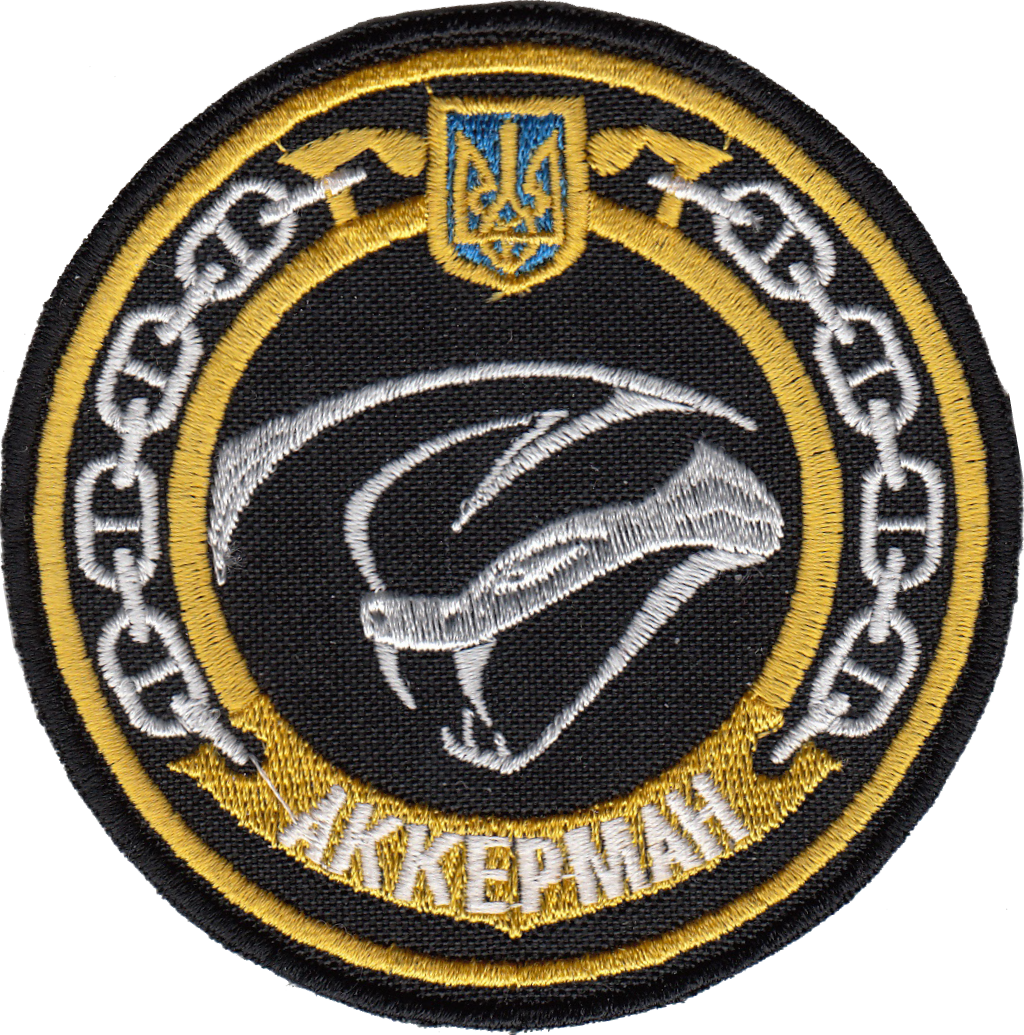
- Badge

Russia
- Name: Razboynik
- Namesake: Razboynik (1878); Nightingale the Robber
- Acquired: 28 February 2022, by capture
- Home port: Sevastopol
- Status: Active

General characteristics
- Class & type: Gyurza-M-class gunboat
- Displacement: 54 tons
- Length: 23.0 m (75 ft 6 in)
- Beam: 4.8 m (15 ft 9 in)
- Draught: 1.0 m (3 ft 3 in)
- Propulsion: 2 × Caterpillar C18 ACERT marine diesel engines producing 1,125 hp (839 kW) each
- Speed: 25 knots (46 km/h; 29 mph)
- Range: 900 nmi (1,700 km; 1,000 mi) at 12 knots (22 km/h; 14 mph)
- Complement: 5
- Armament: Guns and missiles: Ukraine; 2 × KMDB BM-5M.01 'Katran-M'; 1 × ZTM-1 (Shipunov 2A42) 30 mm autocannon; 1 × KBA-117 (AGS-17 30 mm grenade launcher; 1 × KM-7.62 PK 7.62×54mm machine gun; 2 × Luch Barrier ATGM (for but not with); 9K38 Igla MANPADS; Russia; 2 × Tulamashzavod 2M-3M twin-barreled 25 mm autocannon; 9K338 Igla-S or 9K333 Verba MANPADS; Mine warfare: Mines

Razboynik (Russian: Разбойник, lit. 'Brigand') is a Project 58155 littoral gunboat operated by the Black Sea Fleet of the Russian Navy, previously the Ukrainian Navy vessel Akkerman (P174), which was seized at the Port of Berdyansk, following the capture of the city of Berdyansk.

== Development ==
The Project 58155 armoured boat "Gyurza-M" is intended for coastal and riverine patrol, developed by the State Research and Design Shipbuilding Center based in Mykolaiv, as a follow on to the Gyurza-class gunboat. It is larger than its predecessor, with a displacement of 54 tons, length of 23 metres, a width of 4.8 meters and a draft of 1 meter. The vessel is equipped with two BM-5M.01 Katran-M turrets, a variant of the BM-3 Shturm turret used on the BTR-3.

Following the loss of the majority of its major surface vessels as a result of the Russian annexation of Crimea, the class was considered a key priority by the Ukrainian Navy, in the development of a "mosquito fleet".

== Construction ==
Bilhorod-Dnistrovskyi was laid down on 25 October 2012 at the Leninska Kuznia Shipbuilding Plant based in Kyiv. At the time, a total of 9 boats were reportedly planned to be built by 2017.

Despite the turmoil of the Euromaidan, the vessel would be launched on 11 November 2015, overseen by Secretary of the National Security Council Oleksandr Turchynov.

On 3 July 2016, the vessel, now with its name changed to Akkerman was handed over to the Ukrainian Navy, with the President of Ukraine Petro Poroshenko in attendance. Akkerman would complete sea trials in November 2016, and would enter service a month later.

== Operational history ==
=== Ukraine ===
In December 2017, Akkerman, as well as the gunboat Berdyansk and the patrol boat Pryluky intercepted a Tanzanian-flagged cargo ship carrying contraband cigarettes. The ship was escorted to Odessa.

In April 2018, Akkerman underwent a minor refit at the Mykolayiv Shipyard. The vessel returned to service in late May 2018. On 23 May 2018, the vessel, along with the gunboat Vyshhorod and the landing ship Yuri Olefirenko took part in the anniversary celebration of the Ukrainian Marines. During this event, the marines switched from their previously used black berets, a legacy of the Soviet Naval Infantry, to new blue ones.

Akkerman additionally took part in joint exercises with the Romanian Navy in Exercise "Riverine - 2018" along the Danube River.

In late 2018 Akkerman as well as several other Gyurza-M-class gunboats, and the support ships Donbas, Yani Kapu, Korets and Dmitry Chubar were transferred to the new Azov Naval Base, with the support of the United Kingdom. Due to effective Russian control of the Kerch Strait, and in wake of Kerch Strait incident, Akkerman and Vyshhorod were transported by land. In response, Russian naval presence in the Azov Sea was bolstered with the addition of one Project 1400 Grif and two Project 1204 Schmel artillery boats.

=== Russia ===
On 28 February 2022, Akkerman, as well as Vyshhorod were captured by Russian forces after it was abandoned at the Port of Berdyansk. The two ships were moved to Novorossiysk in April 2022. In May 2022, the vessel was commissioned into the Black Sea Fleet at Sevastopol, under the new name Razboynik, taking the name from the clipper Razboynik of 1878.

In 2023, the vessels two BM-5M.01 Katran-M turrets were removed and replaced with two twin-barrel 25 mm 2M-3M autocannon mounts, in common with Russian Project 1204 Schmel gunboats in operation. When in Ukrainian service, Barrier ATGM modules for the turrets had never been integrated due to the lack of a suitable fire control system. The primary dues of the vessel would reportedly be to conduct anti unmanned surface vehicle patrols.

Razboynik underwent a minor refit in 2025, receiving a new brown splinter pattern camouflage. This was further updated in the same year, incorporating more green colouring to its camouflage pattern.

== Gallery ==
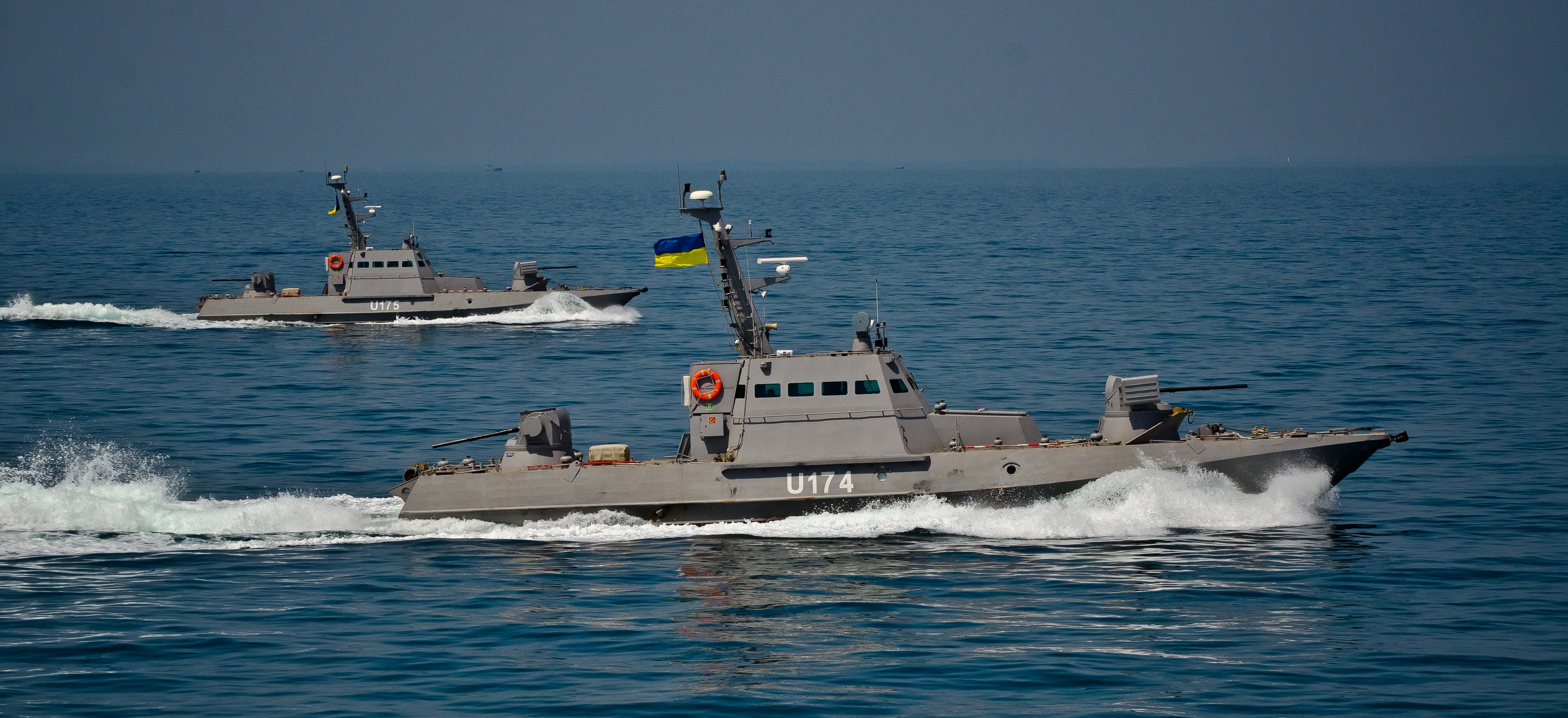
Akkerman and Berdyansk undergoing sea trials in 2016.

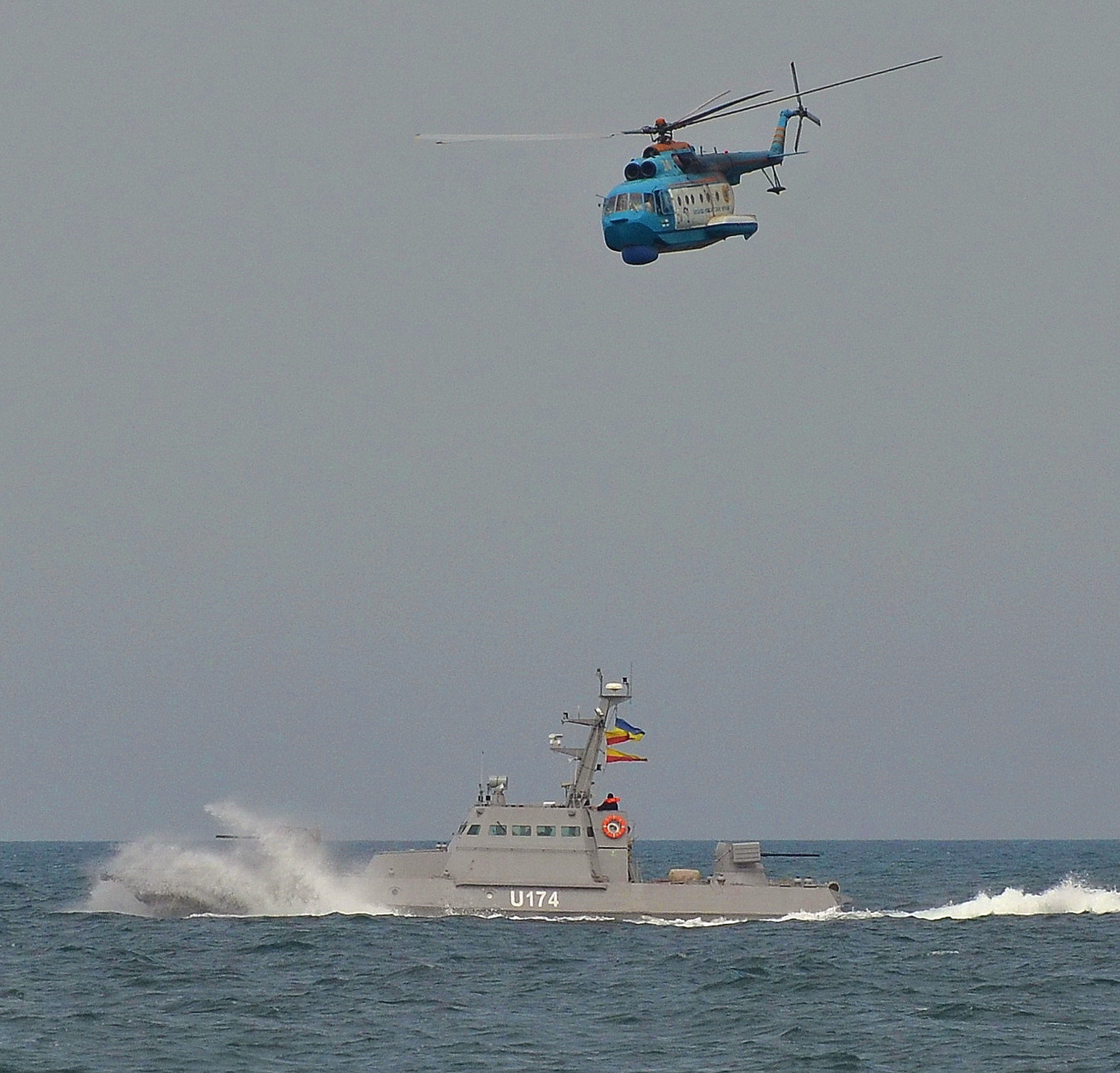
Akkerman during sea trials alongside a Ukrainian Naval Aviation Mi-14.

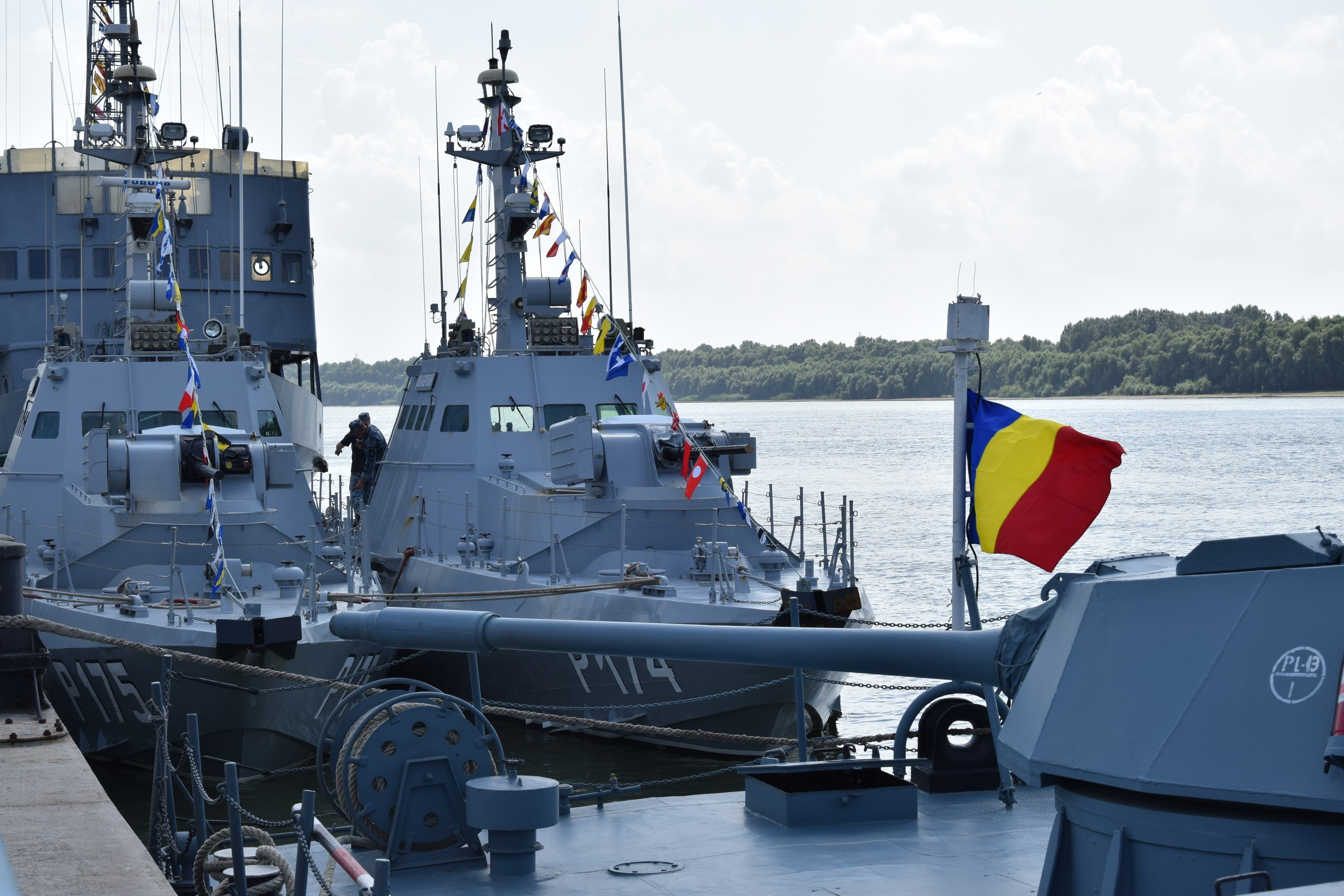
Akkerman and Berdyansk during Riverine-2018 with the Romanian Naval Forces.

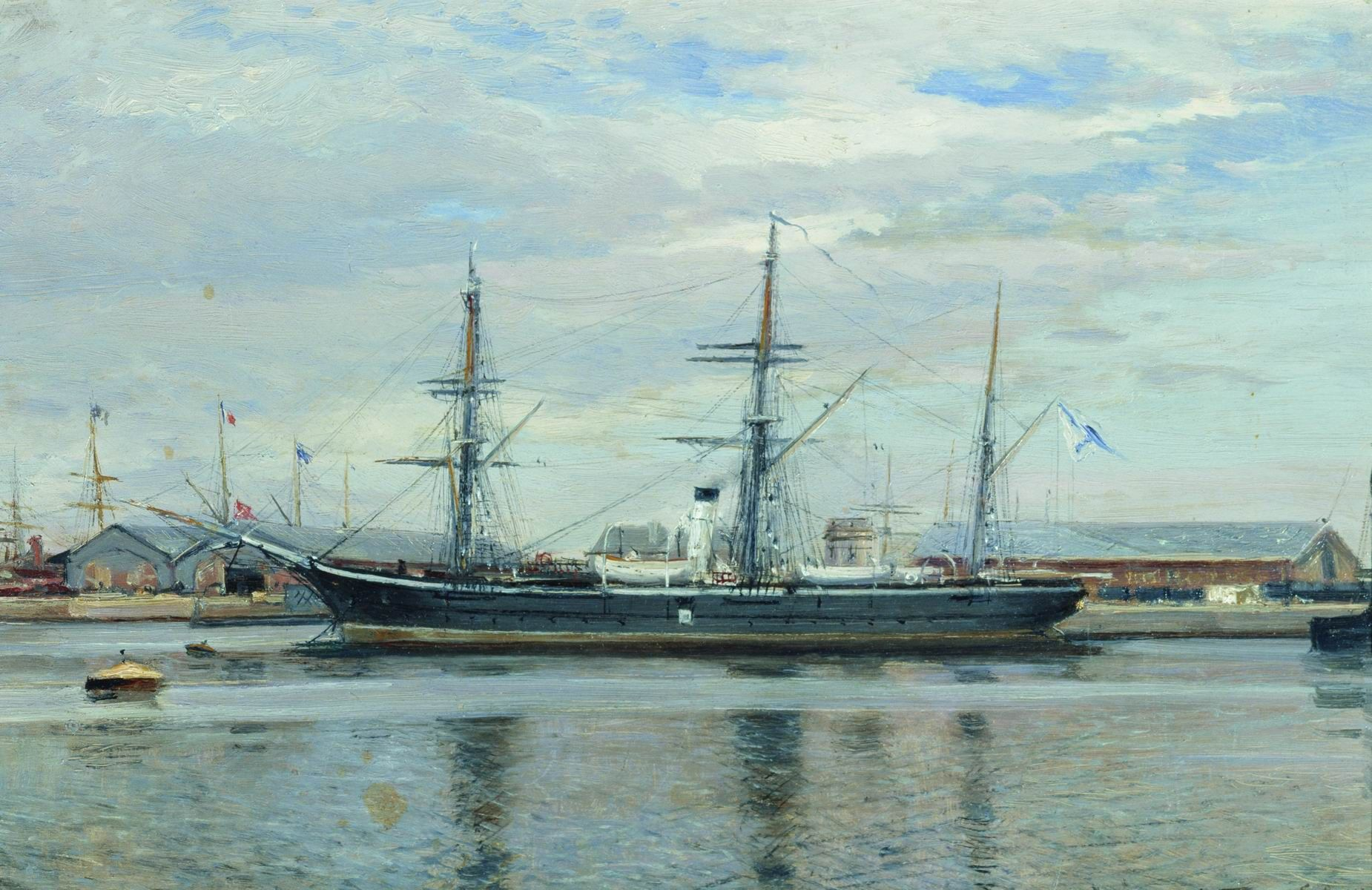
The vessels predecessor, the clipper Razobynik of the Imperial Russian Navy.

== See also ==
- HMS Tiger Bay
