= Ukrainian fast assault craft Stanislav =

Ukrainian fast assault craft

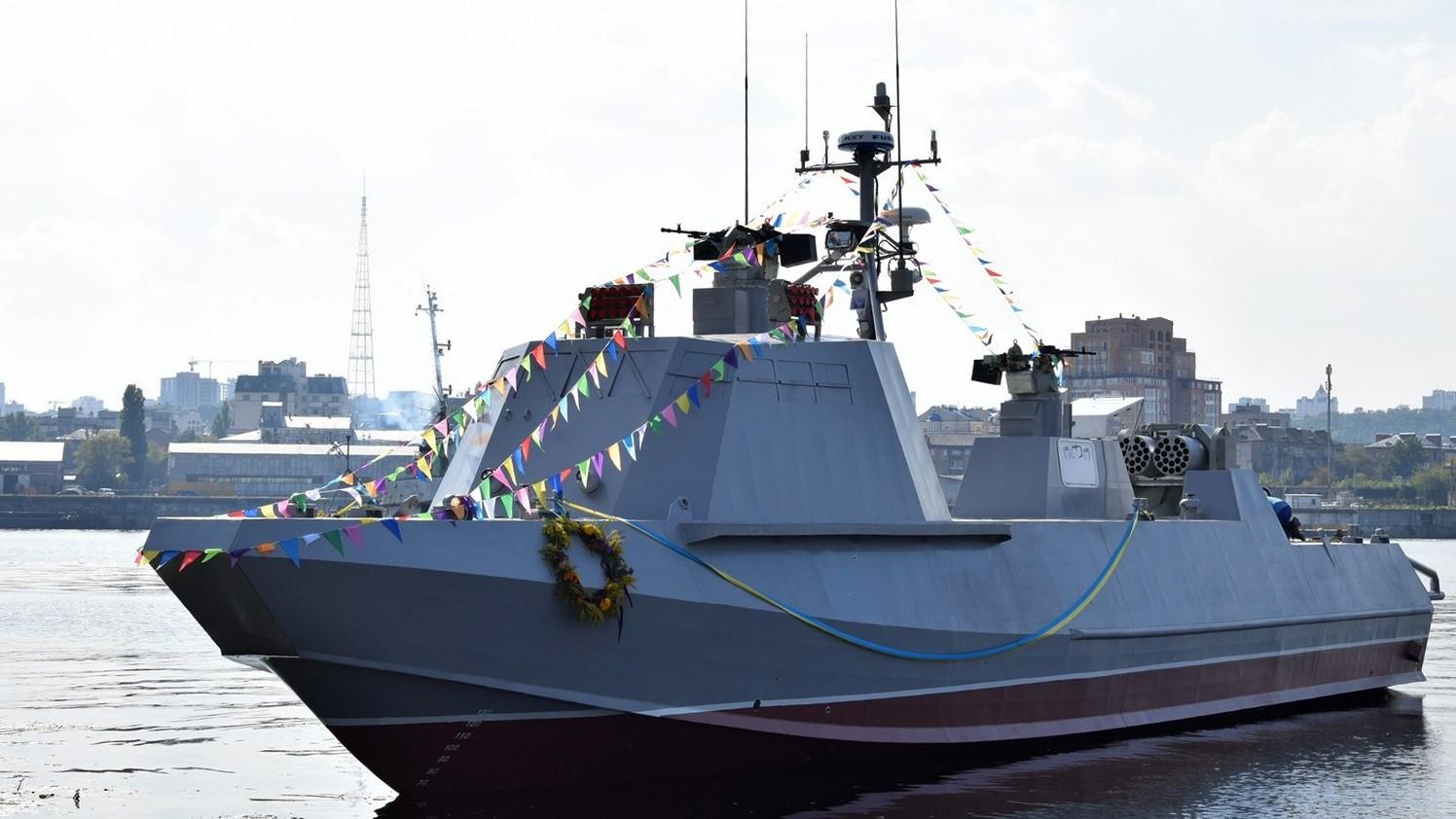
- Stanislav during its launching ceremony

History

Ukraine
- Name: Stanislav
- Builder: Kuznya na Rybalskomu
- Laid down: 28 December 2016
- Launched: 14 September 2018
- Commissioned: 2019
- Out of service: 7 May 2022
- Identification: DSHK-1
- Fate: Sunk by a Russian aircraft on 7 May 2022

General characteristics
- Class & type: Centaur-class fast assault craft
- Displacement: 47 tons
- Length: 24.3 m (79 ft 9 in)
- Beam: 4.8 m (15 ft 9 in)
- Draught: 1 m (3 ft 3 in)
- Speed: 50 knots (93 km/h; 58 mph)
- Range: 500 mi (800 km)
- Endurance: 5 days
- Troops: 32
- Crew: 5

DSHK-1 Stanislav was a Ukrainian fast assault craft of the Centaur class launched in 2018. The ship was built as a successor to the Gyurza-M-class gunboats, and was capable of landing a platoon-sized unit of amphibious infantry for beach assaults.

== Description ==
Stanislav had a full displacement of 47 tons. It was 24.3 metres (79 ft 9 in) long, 4.8 m (15 ft 9 in) wide at its widest point, and had a maximum draft of 1 m (3 ft 3 in). It could reach a maximum speed of 50 knots (93 km/h; 58 mph) using its water jet propulsion. At 11 knots (20 km/h; 13 mph), the vessel had a range of 500 miles (800 km) and could act autonomously for up to five days. It required a crew of five people to operate, and could carry a single platoon-sized unit of infantry (up to 32 people). Stanislav could be equipped with either two machine guns or automatic grenade launchers. It also mounted two MLRS systems which fired unguided S-8 rockets. The ship included extensive reinforced steel armor plating to protect against small arms fire, shells, and splintering. The armor mainly protected the engine room, pilothouse, and the embarked infantry accommodation areas.

The mission set of Stanislav and the other Centaur-class ships is primarily deploying marines and special forces to forward positions, but also includes auxiliary tasks such as search-and-rescue, maritime patrol, and surveillance.

== History ==
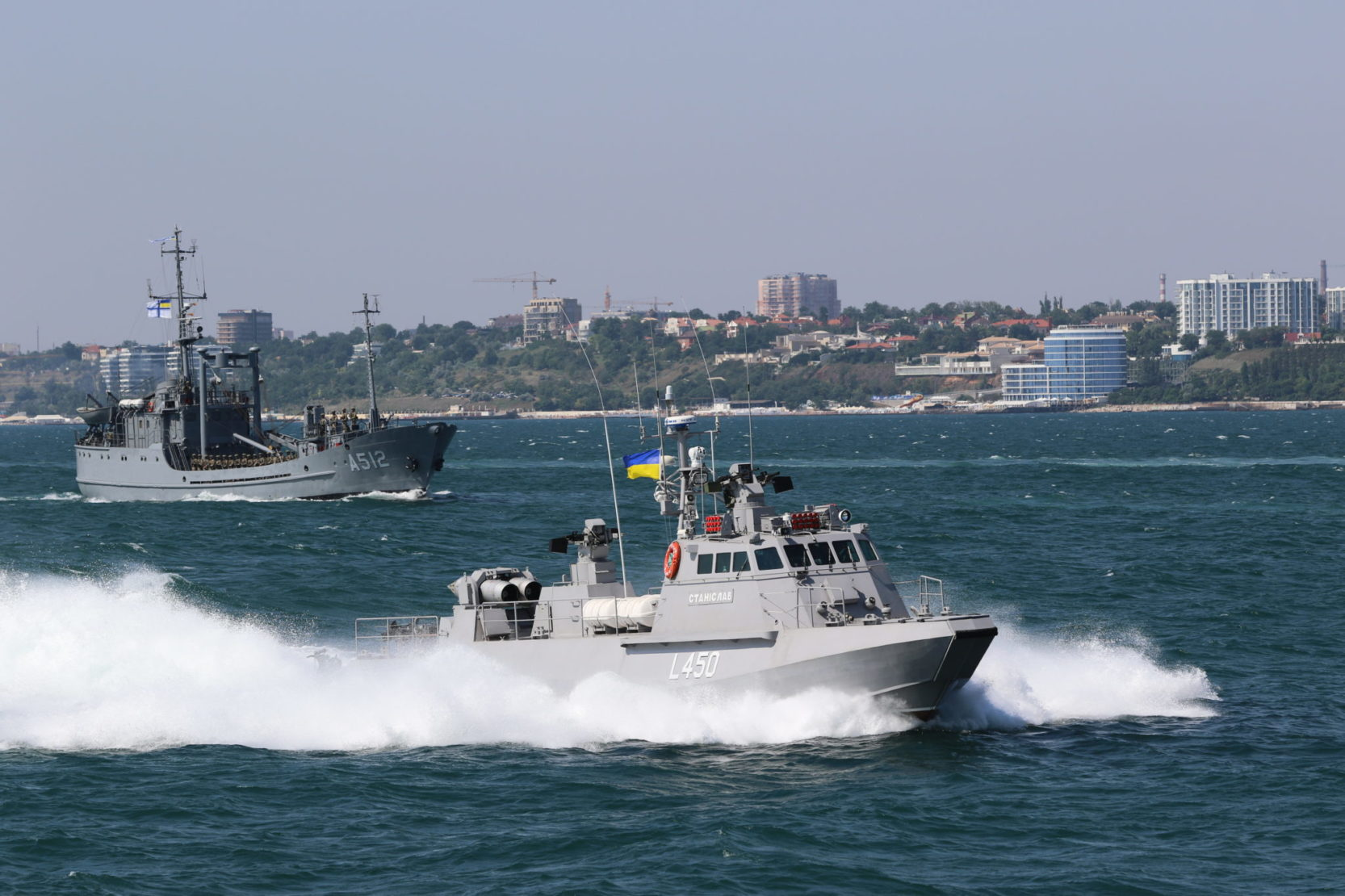
Stanislav underway in July 2020

Along with the other Centaur-class ships, Stanislav was designed by the State Research and Design Shipbuilding Center (SRDSC) of Ukraine in 2015. Stanislav was the first of its class to be laid down, and construction began at the Kuznia na Rybalskomu shipyard in Kyiv on 28 December 2016. It experienced delays in its construction due to issues regarding the procurement of its water jets. The equipment was originally intended to be produced by a Swedish company, but ended up being made in New Zealand. The ship was launched on 14 September 2018 at a ceremony in Kyiv which was attended by Defense Minister Stepan Poltorak and Admiral Ihor Voronchenko. By November 2018, Stanislav reached Odesa to begin functionality tests.

On 7 September 2019, the ship was officially given the name Stanislav, after the village of Stanislav, Kherson Oblast. Failure of the first two units of «Centaur-LK» led to a criminal conviction, the halting of construction of future units (besides the third), and the Ukrainian Navy's decision not to include Stanislav and Malyn in its active combat fleet, despite being in commission. As of 6 February 2022, they had not yet joined its active combat fleet. Between then and April 2022, according to Taras Chmut's reporting, they were accepted into active service.

On 8 May 2022, Russian MoD spokesman Major-General Igor Konashenkov claimed, Russian military aircraft destroyed a Ukrainian assault craft and several jets, helicopters and drones during the 7 May Ukrainian counterattacks on Snake Island. In November 2022, Ukrainian media confirmed the assault craft Stanislav was damaged and sunk on 7 May 2022 during the battle of Snake Island.
