= MS Vereshchagino =

Former Ukrainian soviet medium Vasily Yakovenko class ship

- Missile impact point in the superstructure, with marks made by main wings, stabilizers and bottom-mounted air intake.

History

Ukraine
- Name: Vereshchagino
- Operator: Marine Hydrophysic Institute (National Academy of Sciences of Ukraine)
- Builder: Leninska Kuznya, Kyiv
- Yard number: 1450
- Commissioned: 1978
- Home port: Illichivsk
- Identification: IMO number: 7733826

General characteristics
- Tonnage: 1,220 gross; 400 deadweight
- Length: 54.8 m (179 ft 9 in)
- Beam: 9.80 m (32 ft 2 in)
- Draught: 4.32 m (14 ft 2 in)
- Installed power: Propulsion: Diesel, 1×852 kW (1160 hp); Total: Diesel, 1512 kW (2060 h.p.)
- Speed: 11.6 knots (21.5 km/h)
- Endurance: 28 days
- Capacity: 207 metric tons (as built)
- Crew: 31

MV Vereshchagino is a Ukrainian, former Soviet medium trawler (seiner to be exact), built in 1978 and later converted to coastal passenger shipping. It was one of 345 ships of Vasily Yakovenko (project 502EM) class, which was built in Kyiv from 1971 to 2000. On April 24, 2000, Vereshchagino survived a direct hit by a P-35 Progress anti-ship missile fired by Russian Navy from Sevastopol. There were no fatalities, one seaman was wounded by splinters.

== Class overview ==
In 1968, Leninska Kuznya in Kyiv launched Zhelezny Potok, the lead ship of what became one of the most numerous ship classes in the former Soviet Union and independent Ukraine. In four seasons, 1968 to 1971, Leninskaya Kuznitsa built 40 ships to the original Project 502E specification (Zhelezny Potok sub-class). Eash trawler had gross displacement of 1,192 tons, a 735 kW (1000 hp) main engine for propulsion and an additional 440 kW (600 hp) engine to power on-board freezers, which were capable of deep-freezing 12 tons of fish daily.

In 1971, the class was modernized to Project 502EM (Vasily Yakovenko sub-class). Engine power increased to 852 kW (1160 hp), total installed power to 1512 kW (2060 h.p.), daily fish freezing capacity to 22 metric tons. The hull remained unchanged, displacement increased to 1,220 tons. From 1971 to 2000 Leninskaya Kuznitsa built 345 ships of this subclass. Vereshchagino, hull number 1450, was commissioned in 1978. As of 2010, it sails under its original name, which is still transliterated into Latin alphabet from Russian, rather than Ukrainian language (cf. Vereshchahyn mentioned in the BBC article). In the 1990s Vereshchagino abandoned fishing business and switched to shipping small general cargoes from Turkey to Ukrainian ports. Independent Ukrainian media alleged that the owners of Vereshchagino are running a smuggling operation; Sarata, another ship of the same company, was involved in large-scale smuggling of ephedrine.

A third subclass of 16 ships, Issledovatel Baltiki, was built in 1984-1987. These trawlers, designed to search for fish and lead fishing flotillas, had standard Vasily Yakovenko engines and refrigeration equipment. In Soviet service they were classified in a distinct class of fish search vessels (RPS).

== Missile incident ==
P-500 Bazalt, similar in outline to older P-35 Progress. The length of P-35 marginally exceeds the beam of Vereshchagino.

On April 14, 2000, the Russian Black Sea Fleet command informed Ukrainian naval and maritime agencies in Odesa about a planned naval exercise. The captain of Vereshchagino, which was heading from Istanbul to Skadovsk, ignored the advice to stay outside of the exercise area. Vereshchagino entered the exercise area, 30 miles off Donuzlav in Western Crimea, on April 24.

On that day the Russian Navy base in Sevastopol ran an anti-ship missile exercise. The P-35 Progress missile that hit Vereshchagino was fired from a stationary launcher, operated by the Black Sea Fleet, on Cape Khersones; the missile itself and the crew which fired it actually belonged to the Baltic Fleet. The missile carried a dummy warhead. Russian sources did not disclose the intended target of the exercise. Instead of the target, the missile locked onto Vereshchagino and pierced through the middle of its superstructure, leaving telltale inverted-eight entry and exit holes and destroying the captain's quarters and the ship's radio shack. There was no fire. At the time of impact all crewmembers were dining in the mess, far from impact point, and survived imminent death. One seaman was injured by splinters.

The Vereshchagino incident occurred shortly after two other incidents with post-Soviet missiles. On April 20, an OTR-21 Tochka missile, fired during a routine exercise of Ukrainian armed forces, rammed an apartment block in Brovary, 130 km (81 mi) from its launch site. Three people were killed, five injured, around a hundred lost their homes. On April 21, a Russian missile crashed in Kazakhstan.
