= Igor Kononenko =

Ukrainian businessman and politician

Ihor Kononenko Ігор Кононенко
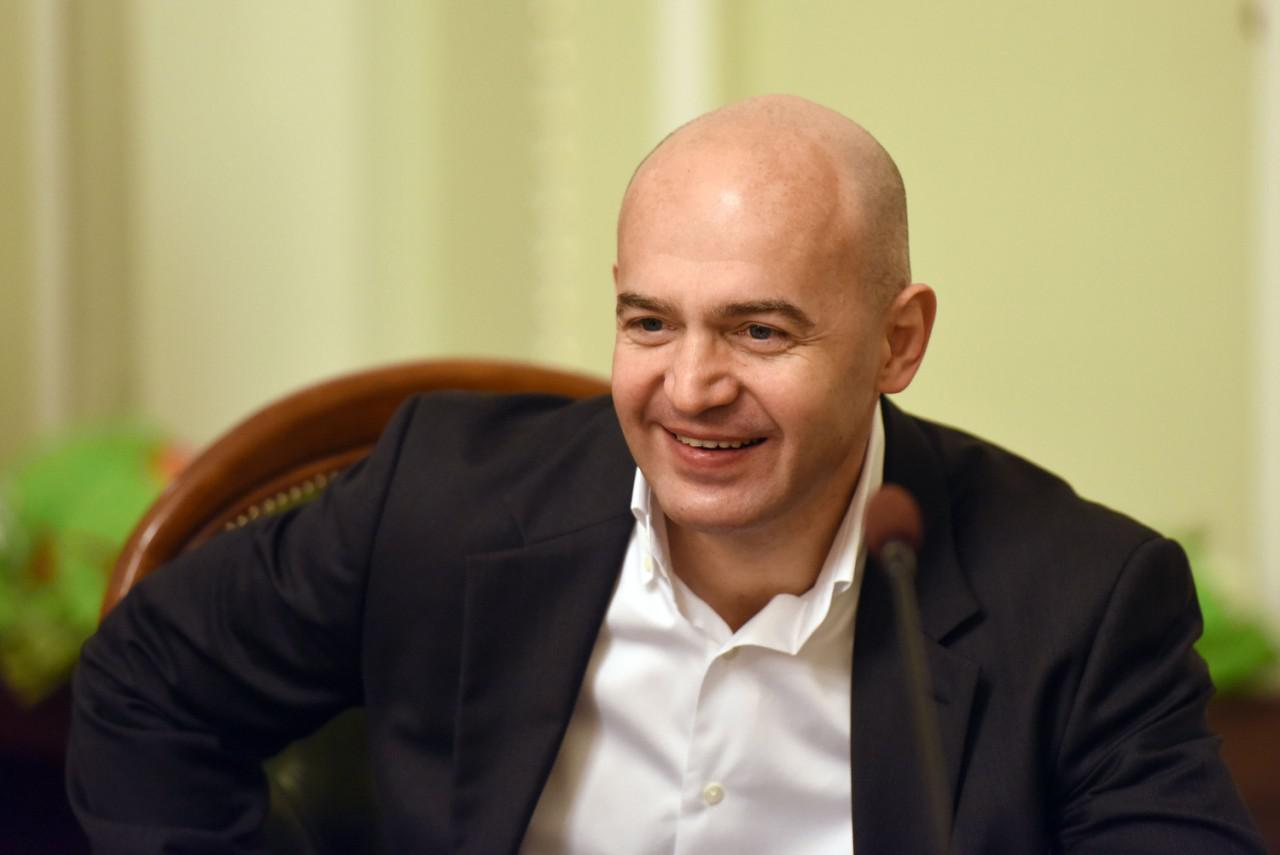

People's Deputy of Ukraine
- In office 27 November 2014 – 24 July 2019

Personal details
- Born: Ihor Vitaliyovych Kononenko; 21 August 1965 (age 61) Kyiv, Ukrainian SSR, Soviet Union
- Citizenship: Ukraine
- Party: Petro Poroshenko Bloc
- Spouse: Liliya Kononenko
- Children: Vitaliy, Darya, Olha
- Education: Kyiv Automobile and Highway Institute
- Website: igorkononenko.com.ua

Ihor Vitaliiovych Kononenko (Ukrainian: Ігор Віталійович Кононенко; born 21 August 1965) is a Ukrainian businessman and politician.

Kononenko is a deputy of the Verkhovna Rada (8th convocation) since November 2014, first deputy chairman of the Bloc "Solidarity", a close friend of Petro Poroshenko. He often referred to as the gray eminence of the Ukrainian president. In the 2019 Ukrainian parliamentary election Kononenko lost reelection as an independent candidate in single-seat constituency 94 (Kyiv Oblast).

== Biography ==
After graduation in 1982 at the 45th secondary school in Kyiv, Kononenko studied at the Automobile and Highway Institute in Kyiv (KAHI; currently called the National Transport University). From 1984 to 1986, he served in the Soviet Army, where he met Petro Poroshenko. In 1989, he graduated with honors in the Kyiv Automobile and Highway Institute with a degree in Economics and Management in Transport. From 1988 to 1990, he worked as secretary of the Komsomol committee in the KAHI. From 1990 to 1991, he was deputy director of the structural unit of the city headquarters of the student brigade. From 1991 to 1994, he worked as commercial director in two companies – MP "Transport" and JSC Exchange House "Ukraine". From 2004 to 2009, he was chairman of the supervisory board of a transport company (OJSC "Kyiv Motor Transport Enterprise – 2240") in Kyiv.

=== Business career ===
Kononenko owns an PJSC Closed Non-diversified Corporate Investment fund VIK, which manages seven companies. Since 2012 he is a chairman of the supervisory board of its fund. Kononenko is the most important business partner of Petro Poroshenko and worked as a chairman of the supervisory board in Poroshenko's company

Kononenko was also a member of the supervisory board and worked in Poroshenko's companies, such as CJSC Ukrainian Industrial and Investment Concern (member of the supervisory board in 1994–2005, first deputy and general director in 2009–2012), Bogdan Motors, Sports-health complex "Monitor" and International Investment Bank. In the latter, Kononenko is a minority shareholder (owner of a 14.92% stake).

In the declaration of 2015, Igor Kononenko indicated the following companies in which he was the head or investor: Shipbuilding plant "Leninska Kuznia" (Kyiv), International Tennis Academy, Medservice Plus, Promavtomatika, European House, Kievgate Investment, Treck Holding Coast S.L. (Spain), Lancashire Big (Spain), Treck Holding Limited (Gibraltar), Vnesheconomservis LLC, RI-SYSTEM LIMITED, Peskovsky glass manufacturing plant (jointly with Petro Poroshenko), Sports and recreational complex "Monitor" (jointly with Poroshenko), insurance company "Kraina" (jointly with Poroshenko), AK Bogdan Motors (jointly with Poroshenko), International Investment Bank (jointly with Poroshenko), Non-diversified investment fund VIK.

=== Political career ===
From 2006 to 2014, Kononenko was a deputy of the Kyiv City Council of the 5th and 6th convocations from the Leonid Chernovetskyi Bloc. He was the deputy chairman of the Standing Committee on Transport and Communications. In the elections to the Kyiv City Council of 2014, Kononenko entered the electoral list of the party UDAR, where he took 11th place.

At the parliamentary elections in 2014, he was elected as a people's deputy on the "Petro Poroshenko Bloc" list (ranked 29th). In the Ukrainian parliament, Kononenko became the first deputy chairman of the faction, also joining the Committee on the Fuel and Energy Complex, Nuclear Policy and Security and the Inter-parliamentary group on relations with Austria.

In the 2019 Ukrainian parliamentary election Kononenko lost reelection as an independent candidate in single-seat constituency 94 (Kyiv Oblast). He earned 9036 votes (12,01%).

As a result of voters' appeals, a pedestrian bridge over the highway H01 was built in Obukhiv (Kyiv Oblast) with the assistance of People's Deputy Igor Kononenko.

== Earnings ==
According to a 2013 electronic declaration, Igor Kononenko officially declared ₴30 million.

In an e-declaration for 2015, Igor Kononenko indicated salaries in the Verkhovna Rada of ₴77,772. From the VIK Foundation, Kononenko received dividends of ₴14 million. Kononenko declared real estate objects (7 land plots and 6 apartment buildings in Kyiv and the Kyiv Oblast) for a total of more than ₴1.8 billion. He also declared US$928 thousand, €965,000, and ₴6,628,000 in cash. The deputy owns a land plots of 4654 m^{2} and 2255 m^{2}, as well as apartment buildings with an area of 1643.6 m^{2} and 36.6 m^{2}. The cost of the first house in the Kyiv's elite area "Tsarskoe Selo" is estimated at ₴244 million, and cost of the site is ₴105 million. In addition, Kononenko has an apartment of 236.6 m^{2} (worth of ₴7.07 million) and Mercedes-Benz GL 600.

In an e-declaration for 2016, Kononenko showed a total income of ₴14,743,000. As a deputy he earned in the Verkhovna Rada ₴161 thousand, he also had ₴82 thousand as a percentage of the deposit in the Ukrsotsbank. From the VIK Foundation, Kononenko received dividends of ₴14.5 million. On the account in the Ukrsotsbank he had ₴2 million.

According to the investigation of the program "Schemes", Igor Kononenko didn't indicate in his E-declaration a villa in southern Spain. The house of 768 square meters is located near the coast of the Mediterranean Sea. Kononenko confirmed this information, but stated that he wasn't obliged to indicate property belonging to his companies in his declaration: "Yes, the companies I own really have an impressive list of property (more than one hundred units). However, according to the provisions of the Law of Ukraine 'On Preventing Corruption', I am not obligated to declare property that belongs to these companies. In particular, the format of the declaration doesn't allow this."

According to the declaration, Igor Kononenko owns the following companies:

Companies controlled by Igor Kononenko
- International Tennis Academy, LLC
- MedService Plus, LLC
- The European House, LLC
- Treck Holding Coast S.L. (Spain)
- Lancashire Big (Spain)
- Treck Holding Limited (Gibraltar)
- RI-SYSTEM LIMITED (Cyprus)
- Piskovskiy glass plant, LLC
- Sport and wellness complex "MONITOR", LLC
- JSC International Investment Bank
- JSC Closed-end non-diversified corporate investment fund "VIK"
- Dzhapan Motors, SC
- Saturn-Trans, LLC
- Yantra, LLC
- Producer center "Together", LLC
- "SMASH" Tennis Group, LLC
- Complex out-of-school educational institution "Health and sports club "ANANAS", LLC

== Social activities ==
In 2017, the International Tennis Academy (ITA), created with the support of the people's deputy Igor Kononenko, signed contracts with the champions of tennis tournaments in the junior group Maria Dolzhenko and Daria Snigur, according to which ITA undertakes to finance the training and away tournaments of young tennis players until they reach 18 age. ITA provides training grants to talented athletes. Tennis training at the academy is conducted by Ukrainian and foreign coaches who have sporting achievements and extensive experience in training tennis players of international level.

For the period 2018–2021, Igor Kononenko Charitable Foundation provided social assistance in the amount of more than ₴7.7 million. In 2020 the fund donated ₴5.7 million to help medical institutions fight against COVID-19, lung ventilators, oxygen concentrators, pulse oximeters and other important equipment were purchased, іncluding for the central district hospitals of Obukhiv and Vasylkiv, despite the fact that he lost the election in this districts. In addition, his foundation financed the printing of an album with the works of students of the famous folk artist Oleksiy Petrenko.

Charitable Foundation presented Vasylkiv Raion a unique specialized bus for disabled children education. There is a patent for this invention.

Igor Kononenko Charitable Foundation also cooperates with Charitable Foundation «Manus Dei» in the field of medical equipment supply.

During each year, Kononenko personally and through his charitable foundation provides multiple assistance to the capital's rehabilitation center "Me + Family" — a unique preschool educational institution that focuses on children with various special educational needs. Financial support for the center did not stop even during the full-scale Russian invasion of Ukraine.

Igor Kononenko and his charity fund help Ukrainian army soldiers in the Anti-Terrorist Operation / Joint Forces Operation in the Donbas region of Ukraine — a sniper unit on the front line is equipped with sniper rifles and new optical sights. In May 2024, the businessman handed over three 700 Compact Pro charging stations, two 1400 Compact Pro charging stations from the Sun for the Army project and four Solar 120 modules to the front.

In 2021, the businessman donated a drone to the Special Operations Forces, a generator and auto parts — for the needs of the 58th Independent Motorized Infantry Brigade.

Kononenko also helped with the repair of St. Olga Shelter for victims of domestic violence.

In 2022, after the start of a full-scale invasion by the Russian army, Kononenko and his Foundation help the Armed Forces of Ukraine, Territorial Defense Forces, hospitals and air raid shelter: body armor, helmets, tourniquets, first-aid kits, hemostatic agents, armored vans, a quad bike, a quadcopter were handed over to the military and to volunteer centers in the east and south of the country, and medical facilities in a number of regions were provided with medicines and medical products. Nissan Navara cars were purchased for the special purpose battalion "Skif". Subsequently, the businessman buys another vehicle for the needs of the Ukrainian army in the war zone. The total cost of the aid provided for the first 4 months is approximately ₴30 million. The foundation also cooperates with other benefactors, at the request of the Charitable Foundation "Terytoriya Dobra", financial assistance was provided for the purchase of a collimator sight for one of the sniper squads.

In 2023, one of the newly created brigades of the Defense Forces of Ukraine received a one-time medical aid of UAH 150,000 from his Foundation. The charitable organization handed over another batch of medicines and medical instruments to the medical company of one of the newly created brigades in the Donetsk region. Doctors created a list taking into account real needs, and after that the Igor Kononenko Charitable Foundation sent a shipment to the front. In particular, the charitable foundation purchased surgical instruments for providing assistance in military field conditions.

Serhiy Varakin, commander of the sniper company of the 58th separate mechanized brigade named after Ivan Vyhovsky, reported on October 6, 2023 that his unit received help from a number of celebrities, including a ground control station for drones from Igor Kononenko. Totally, in 2023, Igor Kononenko Charitable Foundation donated UAH 3,200,000 to help the Armed Forces of Ukraine.

== Awards ==
- Honorary weapon – Fort-21.02 pistol with 15 bullets (27 December 2015)

== Personal life ==
Kononenko is married to Liliya Kononenko (born 1966) and has three children: two daughters (Darya, Olha) and one son (Vitaliy). Vitaliy Kononenko works as Sports director of the Sports school "International Tennis Academy", which until 2015 was the children's pioneer camp "Yunga" at the plant "Leninskaya Kuznitsa". After the reconstruction in 2015, the sports school has become a closed tennis club, which is a violation of Ukrainian law. The Law of Ukraine "On Physical Culture and Sport" forbids tuition for training in children's and youth sports schools.
