= Gyurza-class gunboat =

Series of small armored gunboats built for the Uzbek Frontier Service

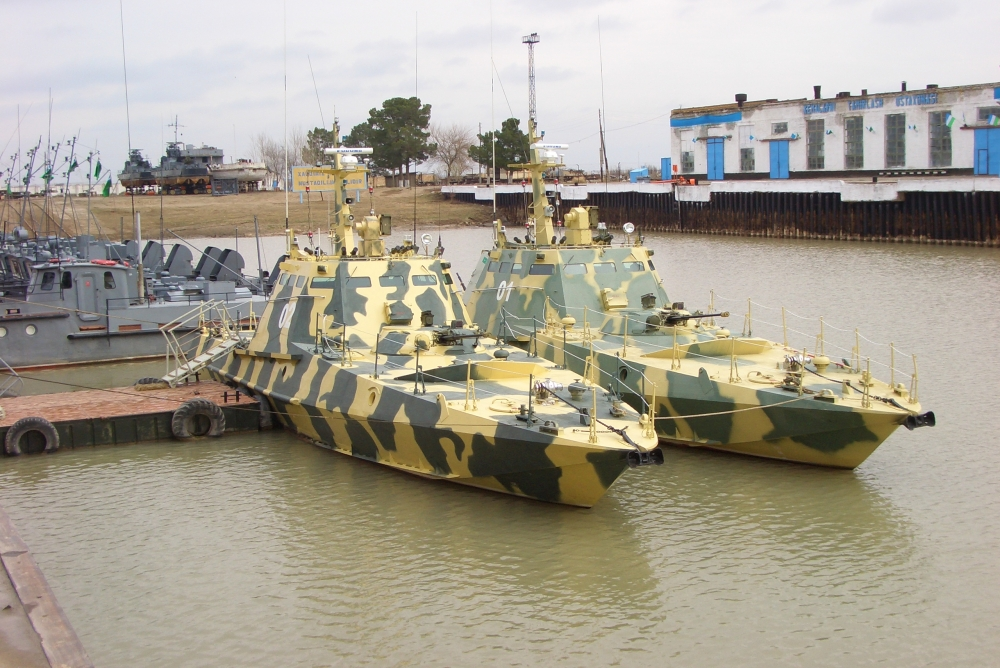
- Dzhaikhun and Saikhun, 2021

Class overview
- Name: Project 58150 (Gyurza class)
- Builders: Kuznya na Rybalskomu
- Operators: Uzbekistan
- Succeeded by: Project 58155 Gyurza-M
- Subclasses: Centaur-class fast assault craft
- Built: 2003–2005
- In commission: 2005–present
- Building: 2
- Completed: 2
- Canceled: 0
- Active: 2
- Lost: 0

General characteristics
- Displacement: 36 tons
- Length: 20.3 m (66 ft 7 in)
- Beam: 4.86 m (15 ft 11 in)
- Draught: 0.86 m (2 ft 10 in)
- Speed: 28 knots (52 km/h; 32 mph)
- Range: 450 miles (11 knots)
- Complement: 5

The Project 58150 Gyurza class is a series of small armored gunboats built for the Uzbek Frontier Service. The whole class is produced by the Kuznya na Rybalskomu (Kyiv). The class is named after the Levant viper, Гюрза, Hiurza, in Ukrainian.

The original and modernized classes are developed by the State Research and Design Shipbuilding Center (Mykolaiv).

There were only two ships of Project 58150 Gyurza in 2004 for the Uzbek Border Guard and were financed by the United States.

The modernized Project 58155 Gyurza-M for the Ukrainian Navy started to be built at the Leninska Kuznya in October 2012. Originally it was planned to build nine such vessels by 2017. In December 2013 the Ministry of Defense withdrew its contract.

In summer of 2014 construction of Gyurza-M was revived and the first two vessels were expected to be completed in fall of 2015. In December 2016 the first two Gyurza-M officially joined the Ukrainian Navy. The new military contract is for 20 vessels that should be completed by 2020.

== Operators ==
- Uzbekistan: Uzbek Frontier Service (Armed Forces of the Republic of Uzbekistan)
  - 2 river gunboats (Dzhaikhun and Saikhun) commissioned in 2005 and stationed in Termez patrolling Amu Darya on the border with Afghanistan.

== See also ==
- Gyurza-M-class gunboat
