= Centaur-class fast assault craft =

Class of small craft of the Ukrainian Navy

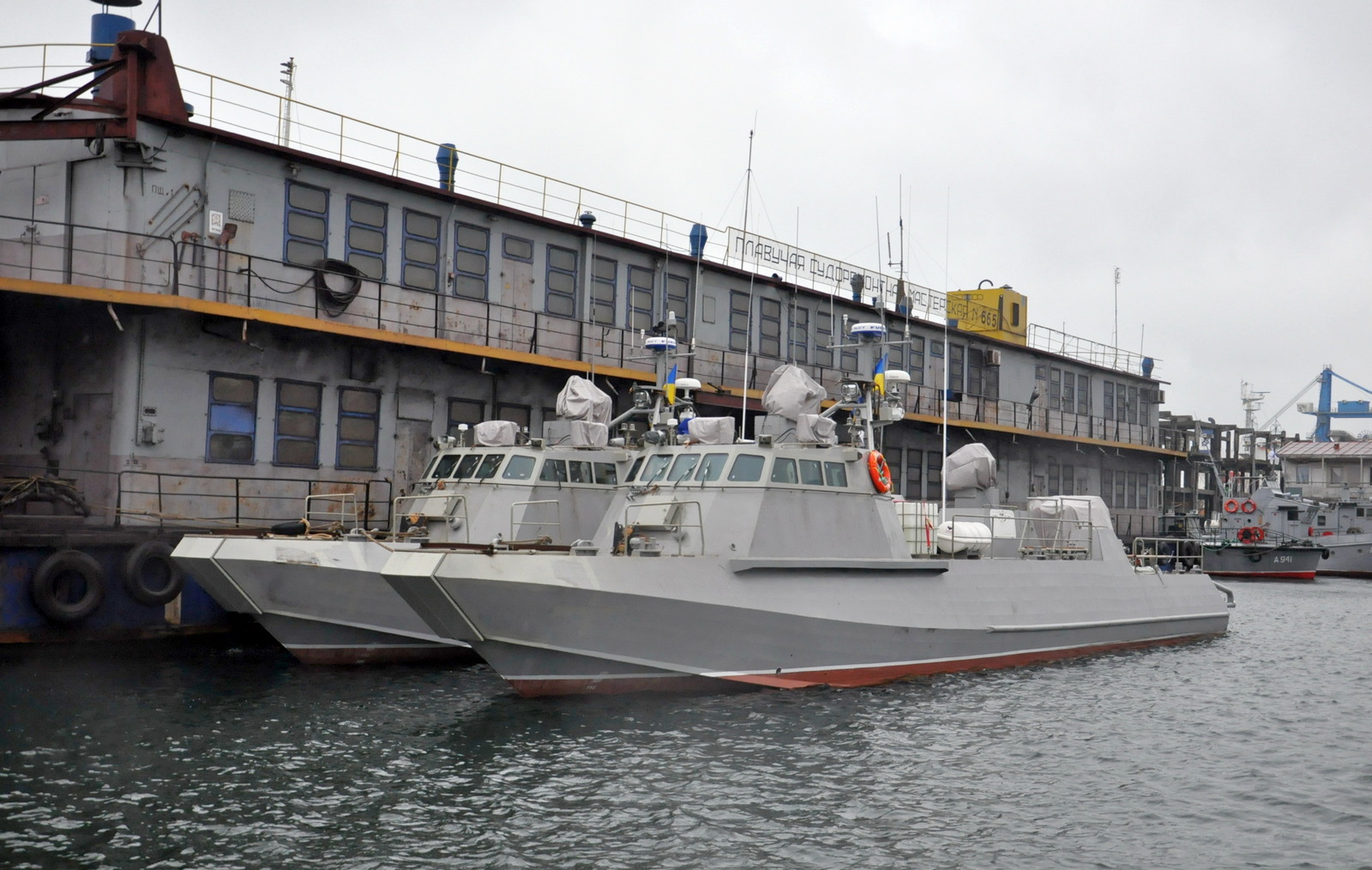

Class overview
- Name: Project 58181 (Centaur class)
- Builders: Kuznya na Rybalskomu
- Operators: Ukraine
- Preceded by: Gyurza-M class
- Built: since 2016
- In commission: since 2019 (Note: In commission since 2019, but only actively part of a combat fleet since 2022)
- Planned: 8
- Building: 1
- Completed: 2
- Active: 1
- Lost: 1

General characteristics
- Type: Fast assault craft
- Displacement: 47 tons
- Length: 24.3 m (79 ft 9 in)
- Beam: 4.8 m (15 ft 9 in)
- Draught: 1 m (3 ft 3 in)
- Propulsion: 2 × Hamilton Waterjet
- Speed: 35 knots (65 km/h; 40 mph)
- Range: 500 nmi (930 km; 580 mi) (at 11 knots (20 km/h; 13 mph)
- Complement: 5 crew; 26–28 amphibious troops with full equipment
- Sensors & processing systems: Navigation radar; Optoelectronic monitoring system; Detection sensors of laser emission
- Armament: 2 × 12.7 mm HMG; 1 × 40 mm rocket launcher; 2 × 80 mm rocket launcher
- Armour: Vital spaces are protected by bullet-proof steel

The Project 58181 Centaur (Kentavr)/Project 58503 Centaur-LK class is a series of small armored assault craft being built for the Ukrainian Navy. The first two vessels were laid down at the Kuznya na Rybalskomu in December 2016. The 58181 project was developed by State Research and Design Shipbuilding Center on the basis of the Gyurza-M-class gunboats, and the 58503 project number was assigned to the altered design used after construction of the first eight units began (by the contractor that oversaw their construction, PJSC ZLK. Designed for carrying patrol service on rivers and coastal maritime areas, delivery and landing of marines.

== Development and design ==
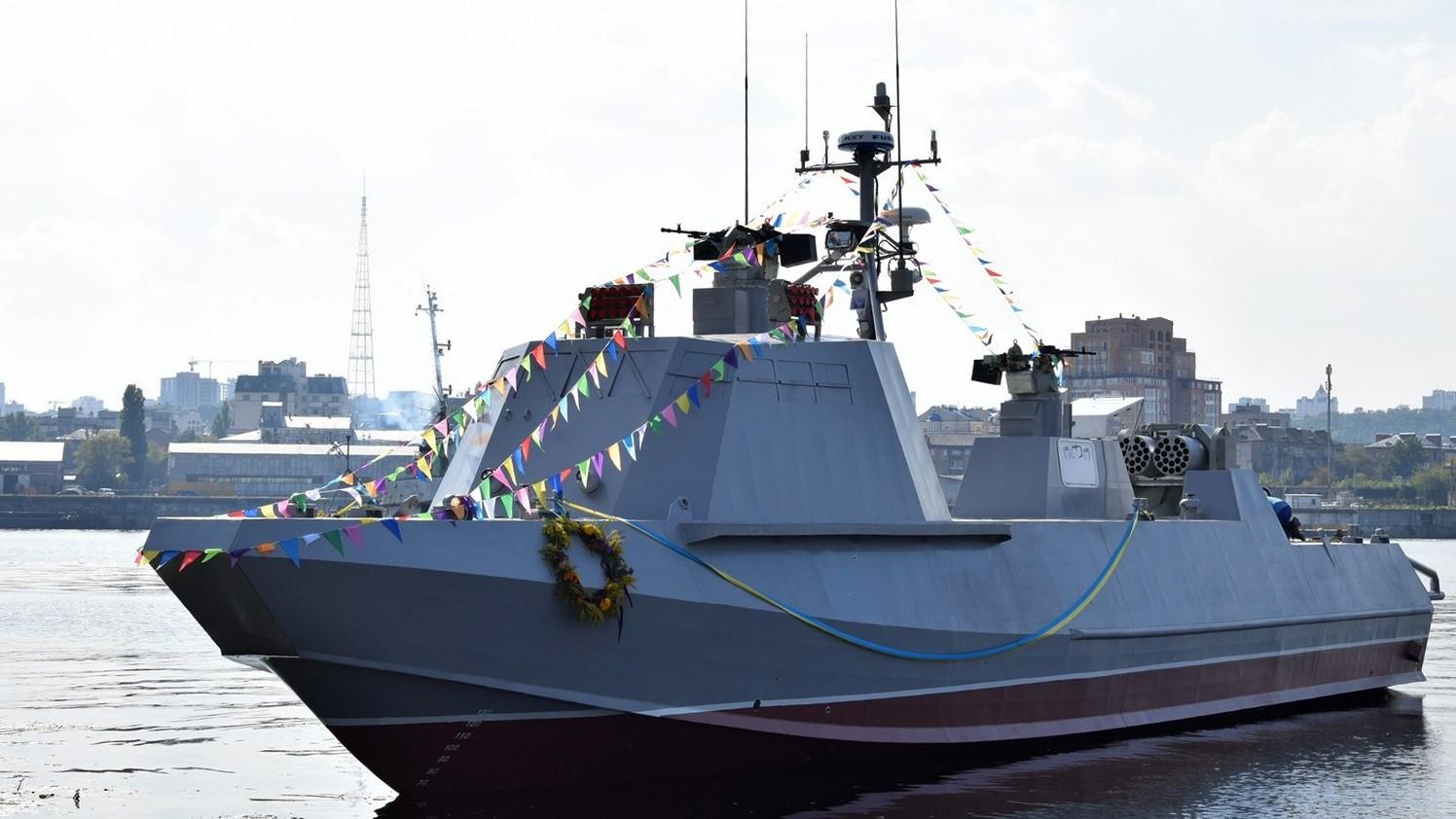
First Centaur during launching ceremony

The project 58181 was developed by State Research and Design Shipbuilding Center on the basis of the Gyurza-M-class gunboats in 2015. However, it was refined during construction. The first contract was signed in 2016. On September 4, 2018, the first launching ceremony for the first boat of the first series was held. The boat was already built on a revised project, which received new project number 58503 and the code «Centaur-LK». On September 20, the second boat of the series was launched. On November 19, 2018, newly built assault boats arrived to Odessa to continue testing. The top speed of 50 knots is achieved by a pair of New Zealand-made Hamilton Jet water jet propulsion engines and can stay at sea for a maximum of five days. The class is armed with two remote weapon stations with 12.7 mm high-caliber machine guns and a 40-mm rocket launcher. The boats also feature two 80-mm rocket-launch systems.

Failure of the first two units of «Centaur-LK» led to a criminal conviction, the halting of construction of future units (besides the third), and the Ukrainian Navy's decision not to include the first two craft in its active combat fleet. As of 6 February 2022, they had not yet joined its active combat fleet. Between then and April 2022, according to Taras Chmut's reporting, they were accepted into active service.

== Deployment ==
On 8 May 2022, Russian Defence Ministry claimed, that the lead vessel of the class, DSHK-1 Stanislav, was destroyed near the Russian-controlled Snake Island. In November 2022, the sinking was confirmed by Ukrainian Pravda and Dumskaya.

A Centaur-LK boat was damaged in port by a Russian missile strike and is currently awaiting repair.

== Vessels ==
Name	Producer	Hull Number	Pennant Number	Laid Down	Launched	Commissioned	Fleet	Homeport	Status
DSHK-1 Stanislav	Kuznya na Rybalskomu	01032		28 December 2016	14 September 2018	2019	Ukrainian Navy		Sunk by Russia on 7 May 2022
DSHK-2 Malyn	Kuznya na Rybalskomu	01033		28 December 2016	20 September 2018	2019	Ukrainian Navy		Active
DSHK-3	Kuznya na Rybalskomu	01037		8 February 2019			Ukrainian Navy		Under construction
DSHK-4	Kuznya na Rybalskomu						Ukrainian Navy		Planned in 2019, but plans of construction halted
	Kuznya na Rybalskomu						Ukrainian Navy		Planned in 2019, but plans of construction halted
	Kuznya na Rybalskomu						Ukrainian Navy		Planned in 2019, but plans of construction halted
	Kuznya na Rybalskomu						Ukrainian Navy		Planned in 2020, but plans of construction halted
	Kuznya na Rybalskomu						Ukrainian Navy		Planned in 2020, but plans of construction halted

== Gallery ==
Project number 58503 «Centaur-LK»

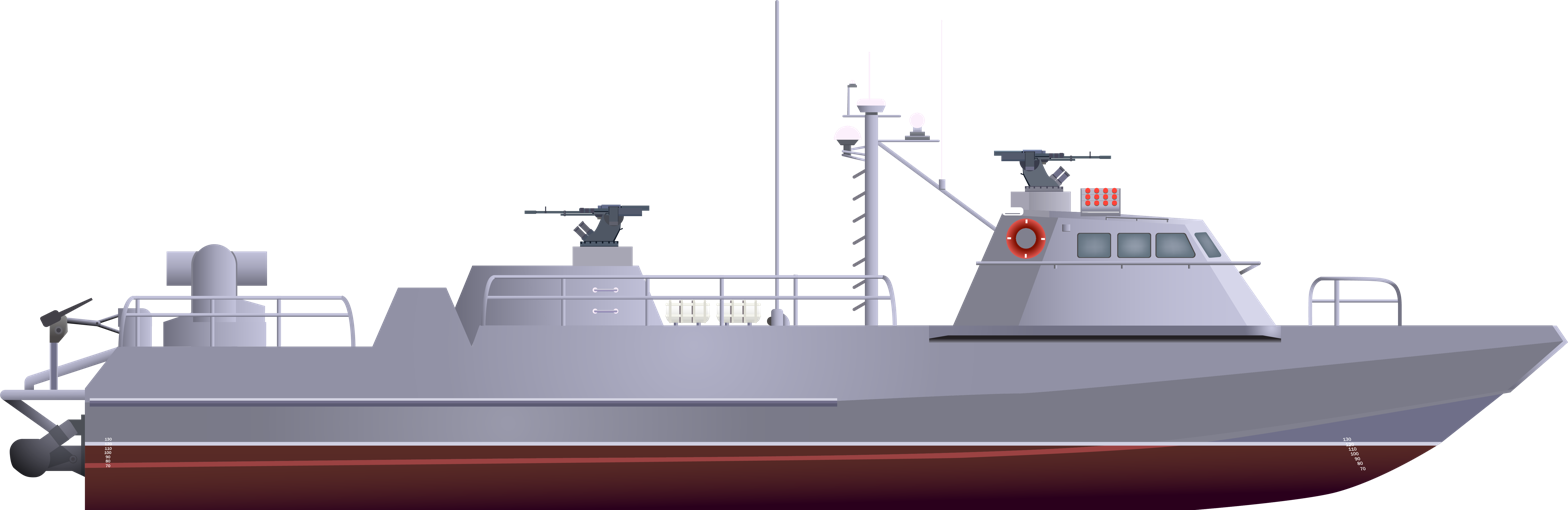

== See also ==
- CB90-class fast assault craft
- Multipurpose Assault Craft
- List of active Ukrainian Navy ships
