= Azov naval base (Ukraine) =

Naval port in Ukraine

Azov Naval Base
- Berdiansk, Ukraine.
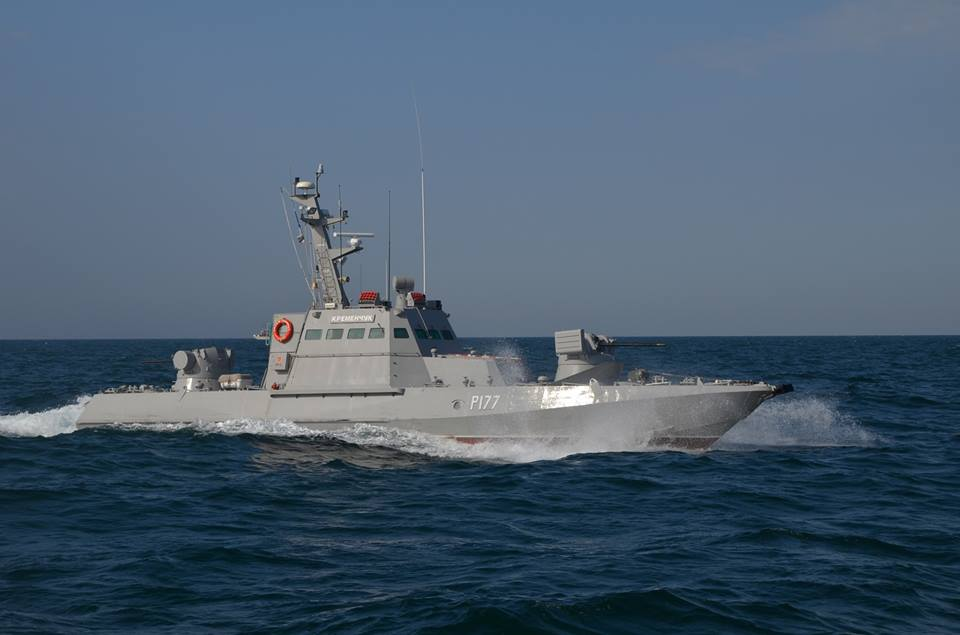
- Kremenchuk off Azov naval base, 2018

Site information
- Type: Naval base
- Owner: Ukraine
- Controlled by: Russia

Location
- Coordinates: 46.7527°N 36.7775°E

Site history
- Built: 2018

Azov Naval Base was the new naval base of the Armed Forces of Ukraine located in Berdiansk along the northern coast of the Azov Sea. The city and the base were captured by Russian forces on 27 February 2022 during the Southern Ukraine campaign, part of the Russian invasion of Ukraine.

== Base History ==
On September 11, 2018, Ukraine's Deputy Infrastructure Minister Yuri Lavrenyuk said that the first Gurza-M small armored artillery boat was deployed in the Sea of Azov.

On September 20, 2018, the Ukrainian military portal informed that A500 Donbas search and rescue vessel and A830 Korets seagoing tug left the western naval base of the Ukrainian Navy in Odesa in the direction of Berdiansk, where they would form the basis of the newly created naval base of the Ukrainian fleet on the Sea of Azov.

Following the 2018 Kerch Strait incident one tug and two artillery patrol boats were grabbed by the Russian Armed Forces, which also detained Ukrainian service members. In the summer of 2019, Russia exchanged Ukrainian sailors for a suspect connected with downing of the Malaysia Airlines Flight 17 (MH17) and in the fall of same year Russia returned Ukrainian boats before revival of international negotiations in the Normandie format framework.

== List of assigned vessels ==
№	Photo	Name	Project	Launch date	Commission date	Type	Displacement	Status
P186 (formerly A830) (formerly U830)		Korets	745 Sorum-type patrol vessel (formerly seagoing tug)	Built in 1973 (launch date unknown)	1973	Patrol vessel (formerly seagoing tug)	1452 ton	Captured by Russia
P174 (U174)		«Akkerman»	58155 «Gurza-M»	2015	2016	Armored artillery boat	54 ton	Captured by Russia
P175 (U175)		Berdyansk	58155 «Gurza-M»	2017	2018	Armored artillery boat	54 ton	Returned by Russia; redeployed west of the Kerch Strait
P176 (U176)		Nikopol	58155 «Gurza-M»	2017	2018	Armored artillery boat	54 ton	Returned by Russia; redeployed west of the Kerch Strait
P177 (U177)		«Kremenchuk»	58155 «Gurza-M»	2017	2018	Armored artillery boat	54 ton	Captured by Russia
P178 (U178)		«Lubny (ship)»	58155 «Gurza-M»	2017	2018	Armored artillery boat	54 ton	Sunk, and then raised, by Russia
P179 (U179)		«Vysshorod»	58155 «Gurza-M»	2017	2018	Armored artillery boat	54 ton	Captured by Russia
А500 (U500)		Donbas	304 Amur	1969	1997	Command/search and rescue ship	5520 ton	Sunk by Russia
A947 (U947)		Yañı Qapı	498 Prometey-type seagoing tug	1974	1974	Seagoing tug	303 ton	Returned by Russia; redeployed west of the Kerch Strait
		Dmitry Chubar	1462 Ruben-type hydrographic boat	Built in 1985 (launch date unknown)	1985	Hydrographic boat	148 ton	Most likely captured or destroyed by Russia
