= Shmel-class patrol boat =

Class of Russian gunboats

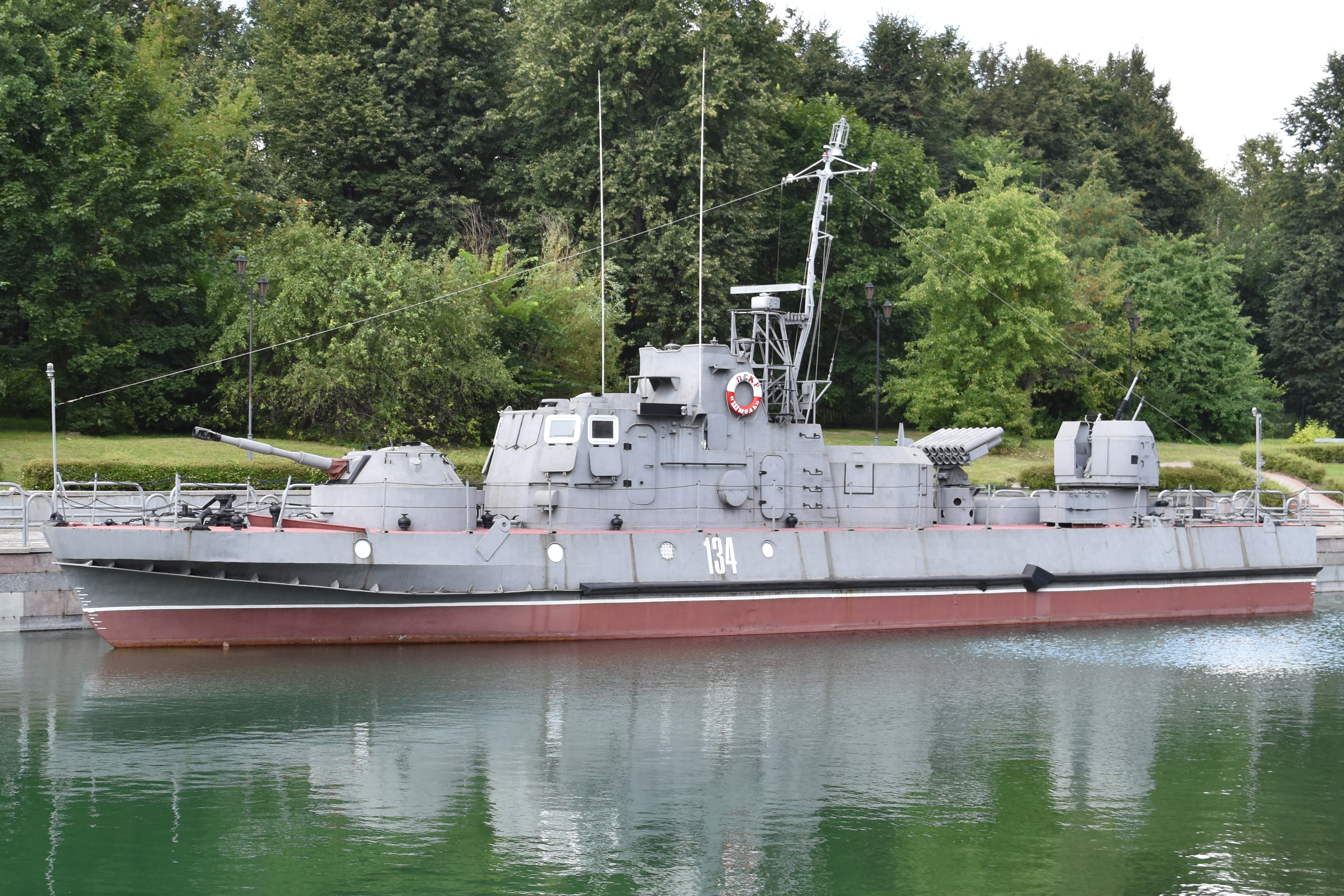
- Project 1204 on display in Victory Park, Moscow

Class overview
- Name: Shmel class (Project 1204)
- Operators: Soviet Navy; Russian Navy; Ukrainian Navy; Abkhazian Navy; Royal Cambodian Navy; Uzbek River Force
- Built: 1967 - 1972
- In service: 1967 - present day
- Completed: 118

General characteristics
- Type: Armoured patrol boat / gunboat
- Displacement: 71 tons full load
- Length: 27.4 m (89 ft 11 in)
- Beam: 4.32 m (14 ft 2 in)
- Draught: 0.85 m (2 ft 9 in)
- Propulsion: 2 x 1200 hp M-50F diesels, 2 x 25 kW DGA-25-9 diesel generators
- Speed: 24 knots (44 km/h; 28 mph)
- Range: 240 nautical miles (440 km; 280 mi) at 20 knots (37 km/h; 23 mph); 320 nautical miles (590 km; 370 mi) at 10 knots (19 km/h; 12 mph)
- Endurance: 7 days
- Complement: 14 men
- Sensors & processing systems: Donets-2 navigation radar
- Armament: 1 × 76 mm D-56TS – 150 rounds; 2 x 25 mm 2M-3M; 2 x 14,5 mm 2M-6; 1 x 7,62 mm SGMT – with D-56TS; 1 x 140 mm BM-14-17 rocket launcher; 4 x 30 mm BP-30 Plamya grenade launcher

The "Shmel" class or Project 1204 armoured patrol boats (Russian "Шмель" for "Bumblebee"), is a class of small gunboats developed for the Soviet Navy during the Cold War as coastal and river patrol vessels. 118 boats of the class were built, and many are still in service with the Russian Navy today.

== Design ==
Between 1967 and 1972, 118 ships were built by three shipyards.

Of these, 56 boats were allocated to the Soviet Navy (10 to the Baltic Fleet, 30 to the Pacific Fleet and 16 to the Black Sea Fleet), while 62 were mobilized by various naval units of the KGB Border Troops.

They were used by the Soviet Union and its successor states. Approximately 50 had been decommissioned by 2008. Many are still operated by the Russian Navy today.

== Hull and armament ==
Since the boats were designed for direct fire support, the 27-meter-long hull is lightly armoured and divided into twelve watertight compartments. The bridge is armoured with 10 mm steel on the sides and 15 mm on the bow, and the windows of the wheelhouse can be closed with armoured shutters. Along the sides, the hull is reinforced with an 8 mm thick steel belt from frame 26 to frame 46. The steel deck is 4 mm thick. The gun turret on the bow is armoured all around with 15 mm.

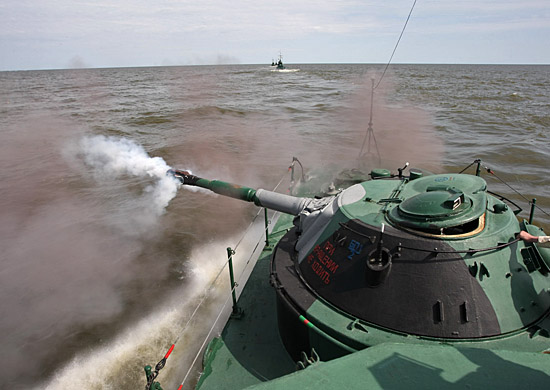
Project 1204 "Shmel" - Division of artillery boats of the Caspian Flotilla

The boats were intended for extended deployment in remote regions and therefore had to offer the crew greater comfort than the wartime gunboats. Thus, the sleeping quarters were separated from the engine room by placing a compartment containing control equipment between them.

The turret of a light PT-76B tank, equipped with a stabilized 76.2 mm L/42 D-56TS cannon and a coaxial 7.62 mm SG-43 machine gun, was mounted on the bow. Behind the turret is the armoured bridge superstructure with a control station and searchlights. A rotating 140 mm BM-14 multiple rocket launcher with 17 tubes is mounted amidships, carrying 34 unguided rockets as ammunition. The launcher must be reloaded manually, is not stabilized, and can only fire accurately when the boat is stationary. At the stern is a 2M-3 turret with two 25 mm L/70 auto-cannons. The boats were designed with launching rails, through which up to ten sea mines can be deployed.

== Propulsion and range ==
The propulsion system consists of two M50F diesel engines driving two propellers. This is sufficient for speeds of up to 24 knots. At 10 knots, the range with the 4.8-ton fuel reserve is 320 nautical miles. Fresh water and food supplies are provided for operations of up to seven days.

== Sensors ==
The boats are equipped with a Donets-2 radar for navigation on the mast.
