= Shturm turret =

Ukrainian remotely controlled turret

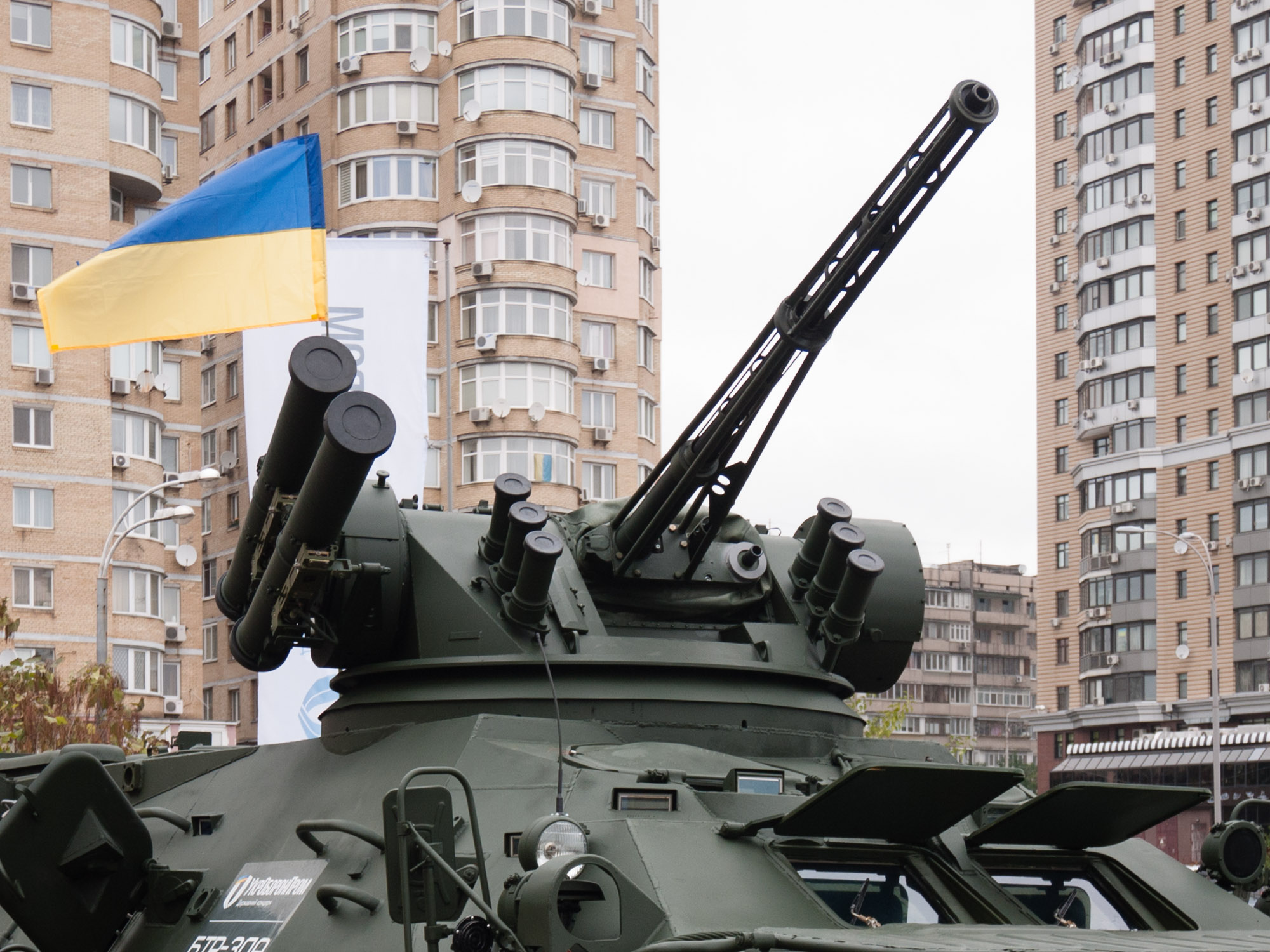
Shturm turret on a BTR-3

The Shturm turret is a remotely controlled turret, developed in Ukraine, for light armored vehicles. The turret adds 1,300 kilograms (2,900 lb) to a vehicle's weight. The turret was developed at the Kyiv Armoured Plant, in Kyiv. The turret is armed with a ZTM-1 30mm autocannon, coaxial 7.62 machine gun, smoke grenades, and a launcher for a pair of anti-tank missiles.
