= Gyurza-M-class gunboat =

Small Ukrainian armored gunboat

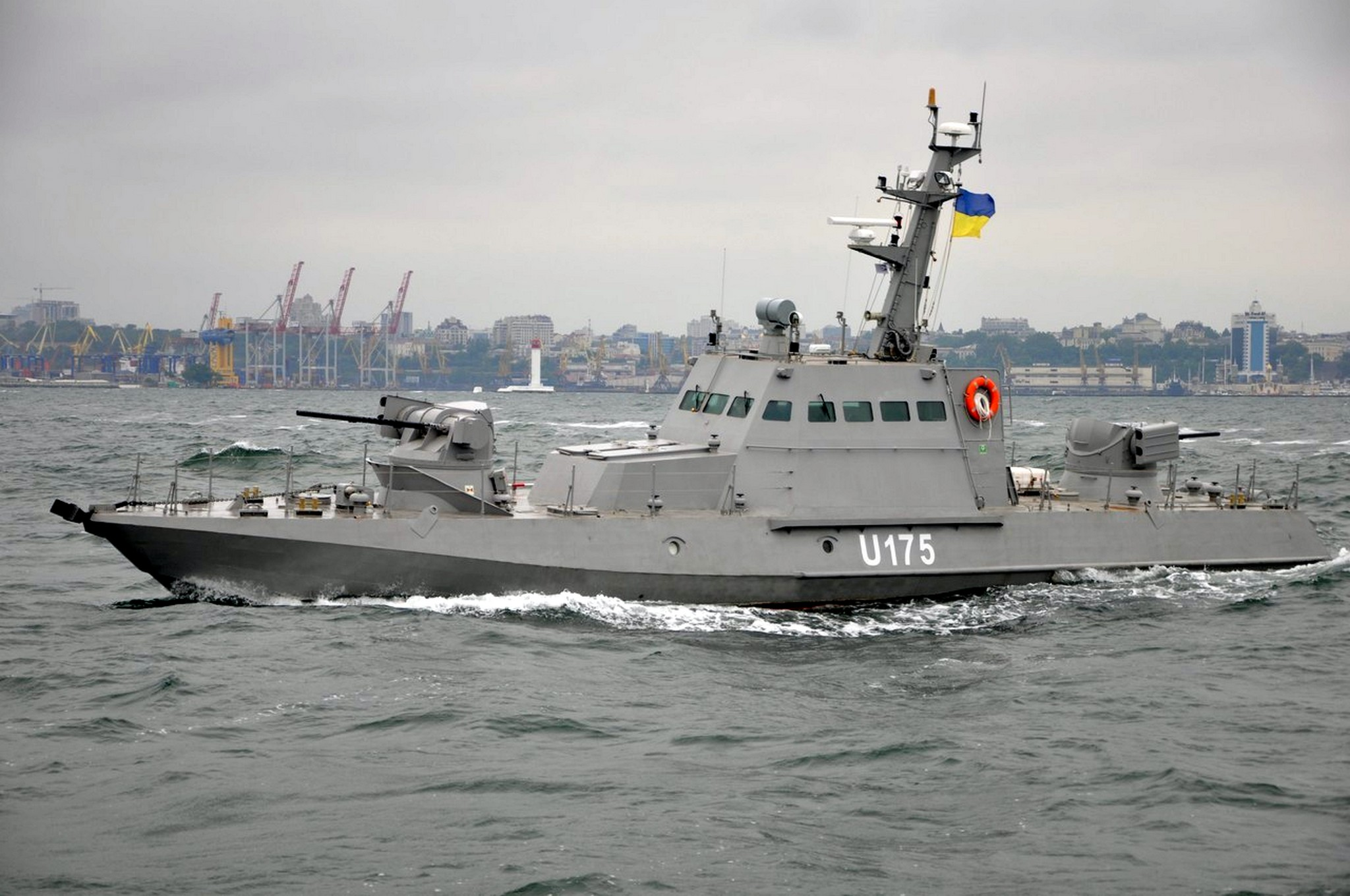
- U175 Berdiansk in the Black Sea near Odesa

Class overview
- Name: Project 58155 (Gyurza-M class)
- Builders: Kuznia na Rybalskomu
- Operators: Ukraine; Russia
- Preceded by: Gyurza-class gunboat
- Subclasses: Centaur-class fast assault craft
- Built: 2012–present
- In commission: 2016–present
- Planned: 20 (originally) (Note: Reduced to 8.)
- Completed: 8
- Active: 4 with Ukrainian Navy (including 1 damaged); 4 captured by Russia

General characteristics
- Displacement: 54 tons
- Length: 23.0 m (75 ft 6 in)
- Beam: 4.8 m (15 ft 9 in)
- Draught: 1.0 m (3 ft 3 in)
- Speed: 25 knots (46 km/h; 29 mph)
- Range: 900 miles (12 knots)
- Complement: 5
- Armament: 2 × BM-5M.01 Katran-M CIWS

The Project 58155 Gyurza-M class is a series of small armored gunboats in service with the Ukrainian Navy. The first two vessels were laid down at the Kuznia na Rybalskomu (previously Leninska Kuznia) shipbuilding plant in October 2012. Originally it was planned to build nine such vessels by 2017. In December 2013 the Ministry of Defence withdrew its contract. The class is named after the Levant viper, Гюрза, Hiurza, in Ukrainian.

In mid-2014 construction of the Gyurza-M class was revived and the first two vessels were launched in late 2015. In December 2016 they officially joined the Ukrainian Navy. The new military contract for twenty vessels was to have been completed by 2020.

With the Russian invasion of Ukraine in 2022 a number Gyurza-class boats were captured by Russia, with some being incorporated into the Russian Navy.

== Vessels ==
Name	Pennant No.	Builder	Hull number	Laid down	Launched	Commissioned	Homeport	Status	Notes
(Russia) Russian Navy
Rasboynik Formerly: BK-01 Akkerman		Kuznia na Rybalskomu	01023	25 October 2012	11 October 2015	6 December 2016 / 2022	Sevastopol	Active	
Nayezdnik Formerly: BK-06 Vyshhorod		Kuznia na Rybalskomu	01031	7 April 2016	24 June 2017	1 July 2018 / 2022	Sevastopol	Active	
(Ukraine) Ukrainian Navy
BK-02 Berdiansk	P175 (U175)	Kuznia na Rybalskomu	01024	25 October 2012	11 November 2015	6 December 2016	Odesa	Active	
BK-03 Nikopol	P176 (U176)	Kuznia na Rybalskomu	01028	7 April 2016	20 June 2017	1 July 2018	Odesa	Unknown	Damaged in a Lancet drone strike in November 2022.
BK-04 Kremenchuk	P177 (U177)	Kuznia na Rybalskomu	01029	7 April 2016	30 June 2017	1 July 2018	Berdiansk	Unknown	Captured by Russia.
BK-05 Lubny	P178 (U178)	Kuznia na Rybalskomu	01030	7 April 2016	29 June 2017	1 July 2018	Berdiansk	Sunk	Sunk, and subsequently raised, by Russian forces during the Siege of Mariupol.
BK-07 Kostopil	P180	Kuznia na Rybalskomu	01034	2018	2 April 2019	6 September 2020	Odesa	Active	
BK-08 Bucha	P181	Kuznia na Rybalskomu	01036	8 February 2019	30 September 2021	26 May 2023	Kyiv	Active	

== Operators ==
Ukraine
Ukrainian Navy: As of May 2023, 4 active; 3 captured by Russia; 1 sunk and then raised by Russia. Previously, 2 ships of the class were captured by Russia and returned in 2018, were repaired and returned to active service in 2020. On 4 November 2022, a Gyurza-M-class gunboat of the Ukrainian Navy was damaged by a Lancet drone. The attack was recorded on video by another UAV.
Russia
Russian Navy: 3 captured complete in the Russian invasion of Ukraine. 1 sunk and then raised in May 2022. BK-01 was renamed Razboynik after an 1878 ship of the Russian Navy, and was rearmed with 2 2M-3 twin 25 mm autocannon turrets, replacing the BM-5M systems which were put on display with other captured equipment.

== Incidents ==
=== Kerch Strait incident ===
On 25 November 2018, two Ukrainian Gyurza-M-class boats, Berdyansk and Nikopol were seized by the Russian Navy. They were captured while they tried to cross the Kerch Strait en route to Ukrainian port city of Mariupol in the Sea of Azov. During the incident, three Ukrainian crew members were injured. The ships were returned on 18 November 2019, but Ukraine accused Russia of returning them in sub-par condition.

=== 2022 Russian invasion of Ukraine ===
Following the capture of Berdiansk by Russian forces, P 179-Vyshhorod and P 174-Akkerman were captured by Russian forces. Russian forces captured another two craft, P-177 Kremenchuk and P-178 Lubny, during the Siege of Mariupol.

On 4 November 2022, a Gyurza-M-class gunboat of the Ukrainian Navy was damaged by a ZALA Lancet drone, the first time a Lancet attacked a naval target during the war.

On 28 December 2023, P-181 Bucha is reported to be part of Kyiv air defences.

== See also ==
- List of active Ukrainian Navy ships
