= State Research and Design Shipbuilding Center =

Soviet-Russian design bureau

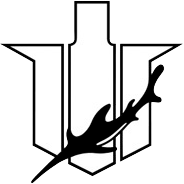

State Research and Design Shipbuilding Center (Ukrainian: Державне підприємство «Дослідно-проектний центр кораблебудування» (ДП «ДПЦК»), romanized: Derzhavne pidpryiemstvo «Doslidno-proektnyi tsentr korablebuduvannia» (DP «DPTsK»)) is a design bureau specializing in shipbuilding and located in Mykolaiv, Ukraine. It is part of the Ukrainian Defense Industries state corporation.

== History ==
Established in 1975 as a regional division of the Northern Planning and Design Bureau (Severnoe PDB, Leningrad) known as the 61st department.

During dissolution of the Soviet Union in 1990, it was transformed into the Southern Planning and Design Bureau (Yuzhnoe PDB, Mykolaiv).

After the succession of Ukraine from the Soviet Union in 1992, the company became a major state design bureau, the State Research and Design Shipbuilding Center located in a seaport of Ukraine, Mykolaiv next to several shipyards.

=== Other design bureaus ===
- Central Design Bureau "Chornomorets" (1949–2018), Sevastopol

== Projects ==
=== Warships ===
- Tornado-class frigate (Wele Nzas frigate for Equatorial Guinea)
- Amazonia-class corvette
- Neptun-class corvette
- Muson-class corvette
- Volodymyr Velykyi-class corvette
- Hajduk-class corvette (Ukrainian continuation of the Soviet Grisha-class corvette)
- Hajduk-M class corvette
- Project RS655 class corvette
- Karakal-class small corvette
- Triton-class landing ship
- BPS-500-class missile boat

=== Smaller crafts ===
- Gurza-class boat
- Gyurza-M class artillery boats
- Centaur-class fast assault craft
- Lan-class missile boats (sold to Vietnam; see TT-400TP gunboat)
- Project Pearl-fac class fast attack craft
- Dozor-class offshore patrol vessel
- Bryz-40M class patrol boats
- Bryz-40P class coast guard boats
- Koral-class patrol boat (Ukrainian continuation of the Soviet Stenka-class patrol boat)
- Arho-2000 class search and rescue
- Bobr-class landing craft
