= Kuznia na Rybalskomu =

Shipbuilding and armament company in Kyiv, Ukraine

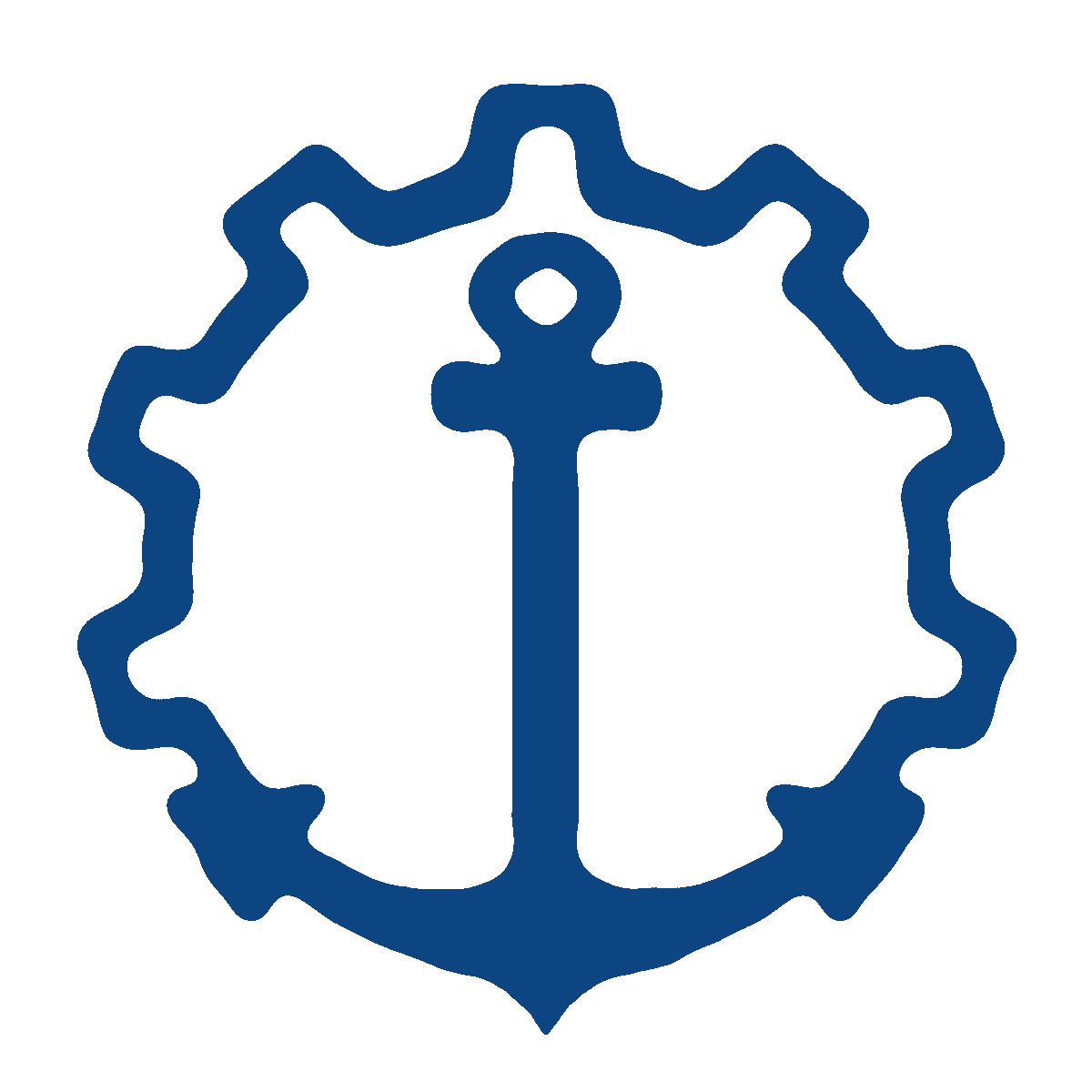
- Type: Privately held company
- Industry: shipbuilding, arms industry
- Founded: 1862 (as "Donat, Lipkowski & Co")
- Founder: Donat Fedir Hryhorovych
- Headquarters: Kyiv, Ukraine
- Revenue: 1,556,000 hryvnia (2025)
- Total assets: 1,073,239,000 hryvnia (2025)
- Owner: Concorde Capital
- Number of employees: 1,260
- Website: https://zkr.com.ua/

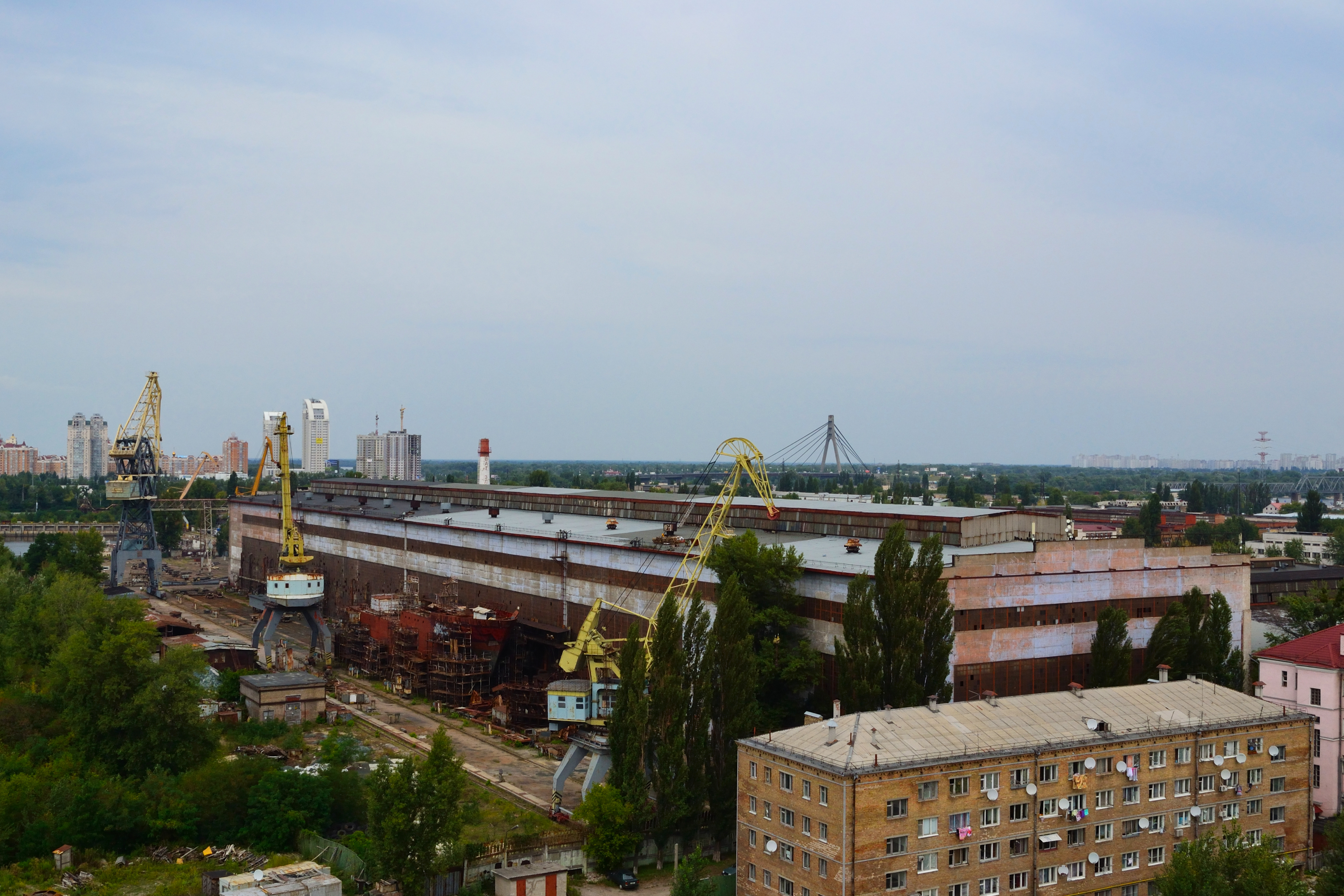

Kuznia na Rybalskomu (Ukrainian: "Кузня на Рибальському") is a ship building and armament company in Kyiv, Ukraine. Situated on the Dnieper River and presently concentrating on river ships, the company is also able to produce and repair small sea vessels (both civil and naval), as well as various military equipment.

Kuznia na Rybalskomu was indirectly controlled by Ukrainian businessman and politician Petro Poroshenko and politician Ihor Kononenko as of 2017.

In 2018, the company was bought by Serhiy Tihipko for $300 million.

The main production facilities of the company have been situated on the Rybalskyi Island in Kyiv since 1928. The shipyard specializes in shipbuilding, ship machines building, and propeller production. In the field of shipbuilding, the plant specializes in building medium fishing vessels, industrial ships and vessels of technical fleet, self-propelled and non-self-propelled barges. Machine building includes steam and hot-water automated boiler units, plate freezing apparatuses, and incinerators. Propeller production includes controllable-pitch propeller (CPP), blades, and lines of shafting.

== History ==
It was founded in 1862 by production engineer Fyodor Gregorevich Donat as a Joint Stock Company in the Russian Empire. It was mainly a mechanical plant and made different metal structures. For a short period of time (1889-1924), the plant was named "Kiev Machine-Building Plant" and in 1924, it was renamed to Leninska Kuznia. In 1928, by the Decree of Supreme Soviet Union Leninska Kuznia was made into a shipyard. During the Soviet period the LK shipyard also was known as the Ship-building Factory SSZ #302.

In 1995, the company completed a change in ownership and open-type joint Stock Company was set up named Leninska Kuznia Plant. The machine building sector still constitutes a high percentage in general scope of production. In 2017 the plant changed its name to Kuznia na Rybalskomu (the Smithy on the Fishers' [Island]).

=== After 2014 ===
On January 30, 2015, it was announced that the plant had started production of two new armored vehicles: Tryton (literally Newt) and Arbalet (literally Crossbow) in accordance to NATO standards.

On November 10, 2015, the plant finished the first two Gyurza-M-class artillery boats for the Ukrainian Navy, which were later named "Akkerman" and "Berdyansk".

In June 2017, the plant finished artillery boats of Gyurza-M-class for the Ukrainian Navy, which were named "Vyshhorod", "Kremenchuk", "Lubny" and "Nikopol".

In July 2018, the plant began production of 40 mm PGOF-40 grenades in a joint venture with the Shostka State Plant "Impuls".

=== Acquisitions, investigations and bankruptcy ===
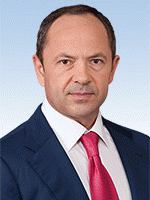
Serhiy Tihipko

In November 2018, six months before the 2019 Ukrainian presidential election, Ukrainian president Petro Poroshenko and his business partner Ihor Kononenko finalised the sale of their combined shares in the shipyard to Ewins Limited, a Cyprus based company owned by the TAS Group, controlled by businessman and former vice prime minister Serhiy Tihipko. Poroshenko stated that his decision to divest from the shipyard was to prevent the perception of a conflict of interest. The deal was approved by the Antimonopoly Committee of Ukraine in October 2018. Subsequently, Tihipko acquired a 94.03% controlling interest in the shipyard for a price of $300 million USD.Tihipko paid a $10.6 million upfront advance, leaving the remaining payment as a deferred debt due in 2025, with the shipyard itself acting as the financial guarantor. Following the acquisition, Tihipko stated that large unused sections of the shipyard were under consideration for residential and commercial property development.

In mid 2019, proposals for large scale development were announced, in the form of the Lipki Island City Resort by City One Development. Plans included the development of thirty six high rise condominiums, schools and a marina.

On 29 May 2019, a fire occurred on the grounds of the plant. Imagery released by the State Emergency Service of Ukraine showed that the fire appeared to have originated from a Project 502EM trawler undergoing conversion into a reconnaissance ship for the Ukrainian Navy.

In 2020, it was reported that the production of Gyurza-M and Centaur vessels had stalled, with the eighth Gyurza-M-class gunboat BK-08 being unfinished, while the third Centaur-class only existed in the form of a small section of the bow. However in 2023, BK-08 would be commissioned under emergency wartime service as Bucha.

==== 'Boats and Ambulances' Scandal ====
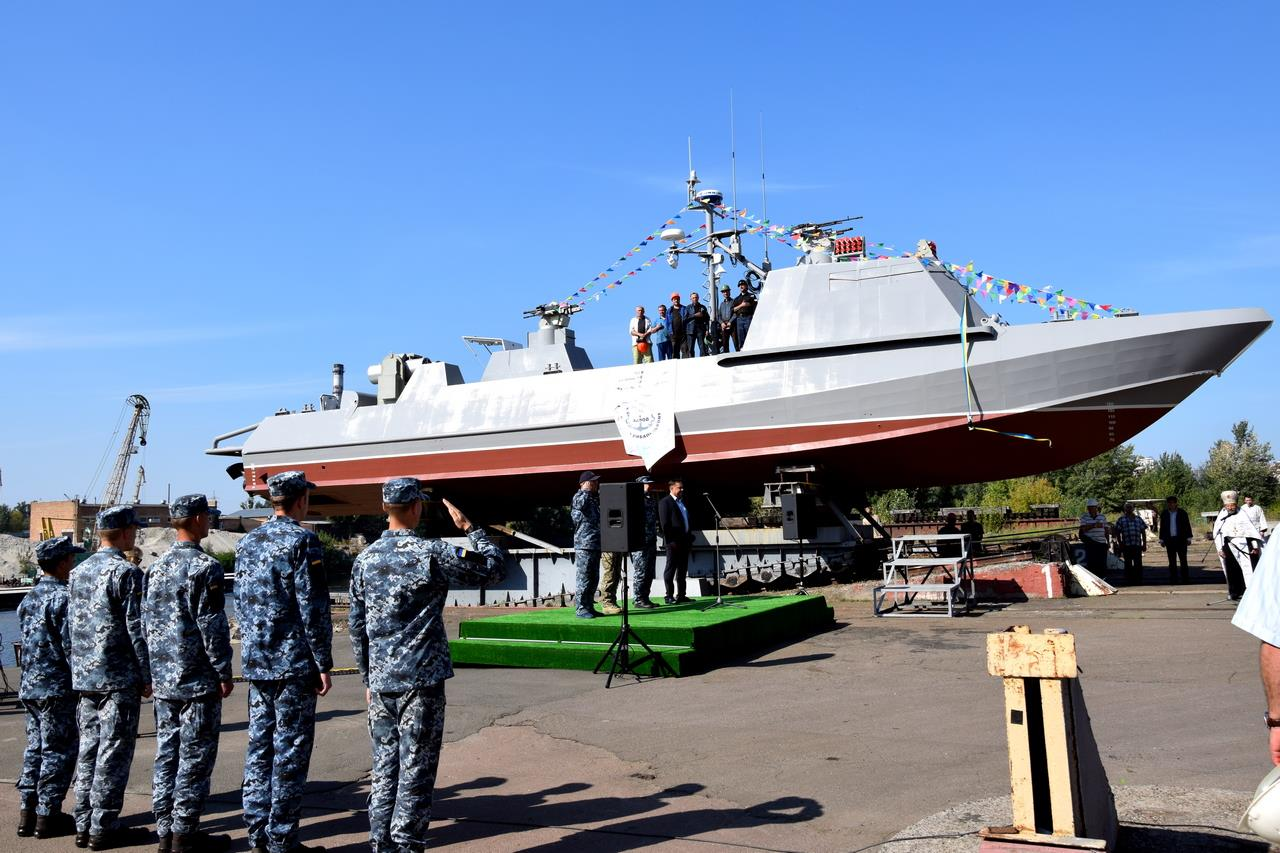
Launch of the Centaur-class fast assault craft Stanislav, 2018

The shipyard was a central focus in the high profile "Boats and Ambulances" corruption investigation conducted by the Ukrainian State Bureau of Investigation against the former Deputy Minister of Defence Ihor Pavlovsky and Chairman of the Shipyard Valery Shandra. As a result, in 2019, all real estate, immovable property and corporate rights belonging to the shipyard were frozen. The case alleged that between 2016 and 2018, military officials colluded with two prominent companies owned by Petro Poroshenko; Kuznia as well as Bogdan Corporation in the supply of substandard Gyurza-M and Centaur combat vessels, as well as Bogdan-2251 military ambulances. The shipyard pushed back against the allegations, claiming that the investigation was conducted using falsified evidence, and had reportedly damaged the fast assault craft Stanislav during its seizure.

Throughout 2021, a number of high profile raids took place involving the two firms, culminating in the arrest and pre-trial detention of Valery Shandra and Ihor Pavlovsky. Shandra's bail was set at over 440 million hryvnia, slammed by the defence as a politically motivated show trial, while the prosecution maintained the severity of the fine, in relation to the degradation of the countries defensive readiness. In October 2021, the Commercial Court of Kyiv ordered the shipyard to pay a 47.3 million hryvnia fine for breaching a 2017 contract on the repair and modernisation of the Ukrainian Navy's flagship, Hetman Sahaidachny.

In 2022, the deal would collapse, with representatives of Poroshenko and Kononenko executing an early repayment clause demanding the remaining balance. With Tihipko unable to pay, the full $290 million debt was legally transferred to the shipyard. On 19 December 2022, the plant filed for bankruptcy protection with the Commercial Court of Kyiv. The filing was triggered by a petition from the Cyprus based Proctoremo Investments over an unpaid debt of 83.3 million hryvnia.

=== Redevelopment ===
In 2023, the bankrupt plant was acquired by the investment company Concorde Capital, led by Igor Mazepa, a close associate of Tihipko. Initially, the company intended to resell the asset, but was forced to pivot when the ongoing conflict and debt liabilities discouraged external buyers. In December 2025, the Antimonopoly Committee of Ukraine approved the formal transfer of the business to the Cyprus based Avalia Investments, an offshore holding of Concorde Capital. In 2026, the company reaffirmed plans to develop the site.

== Production ==
- Gyurza-M-class artillery boat
- Grisha-class corvette
  - Grisha I (5 vessels)
    - MPK-52/U-210 "Kherson" built in 1968-71, transferred to Ukraine in 1997, decommissioned in 1997
    - MPK-31 built in 1969-73, decommissioned in 1995
    - MPK-127 built in 1974-76
    - MPK-6 laid down in 1976, status uncertain
    - MPK-44 "Komsomolets Latvii"/F11 "Zemaitis" laid down in 1977, transferred to Lithuania in 1992, delisted in 2008
  - Grisha III (11 vessels)
    - MPK-134 (MPK-64) "Kievskiy komsomolets"/"Muromets" built in 1980-82, renamed in 1992
    - MPK-118 "Komsomolets Moldavii"/"Suzdalets" built in 1981-83, renamed in 1992
    - MPK-139 built in 1982-84
    - MPK-190 built in 1983-85
    - MPK-199 "Komsomolets Armenii"/"Kasimov" built in 1984-85, renamed in 1992
    - MPK-202 laid down in 1985, status uncertain
    - MPK-113 laid down in 1985, status uncertain
    - MPK-207 "Povorino" built in 1986-88
    - MPK-217 "Eisk" built in 1987-89
    - MPK-125 (MPK-214) "Leninskaya Kuznitsa"/"Sovetskaya Gavan" built in 1987-90, renamed in 1992
    - MPK-82 built in 1989-91
  - Grisha V (4 vessels, project 1124 MU by LK for Ukraine)
    - U205 "Lutsk" built in 1992-93, captured by Russia in 2014
    - U209 "Ternopil" built in 1991-02, captured by Russia in 2014
    - U201 "Lviv" laid down in 1992, never finished
    - "Zaporizka Sich" planned, never realized

== Gallery ==
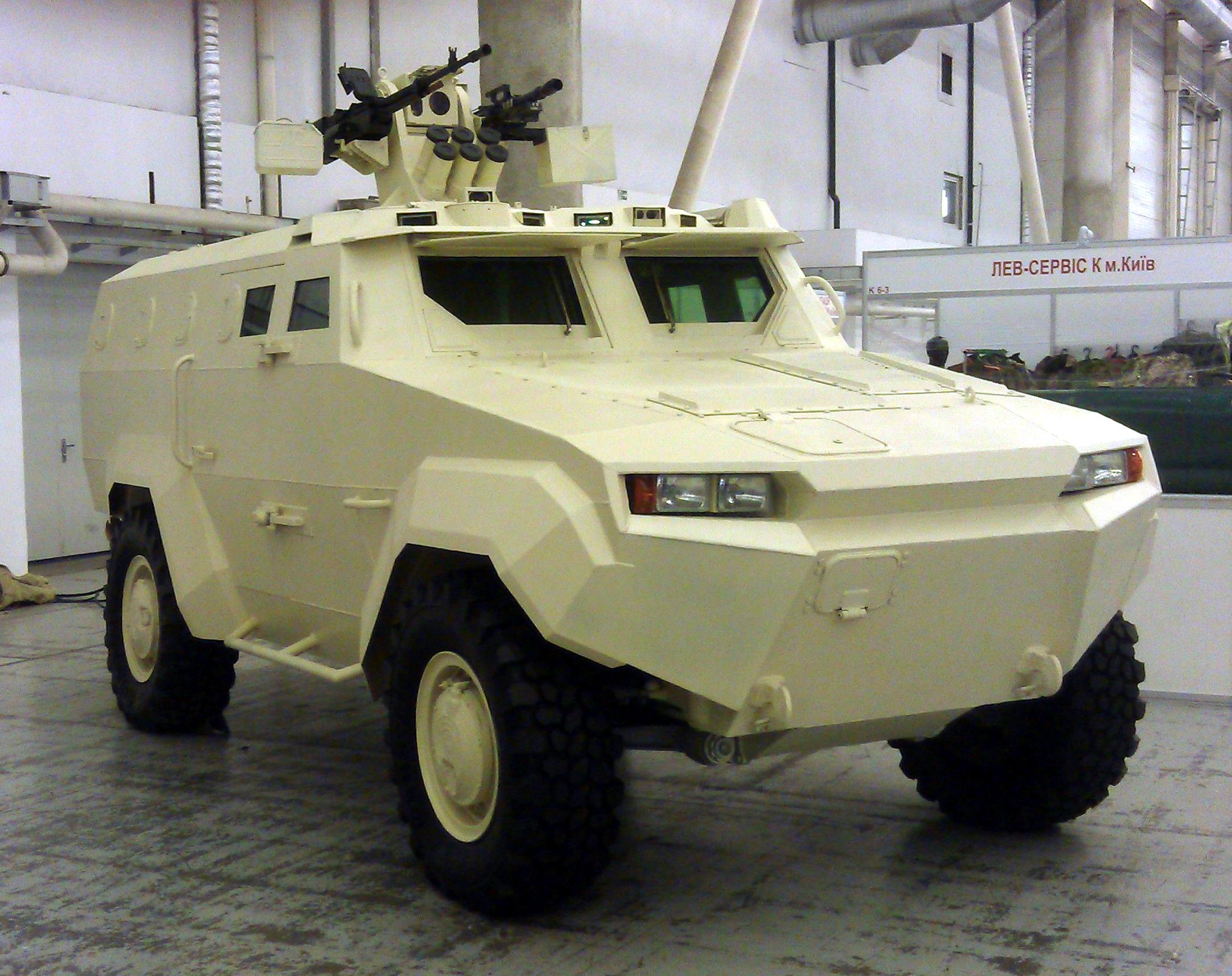
Armoured vehicle "Tryton"

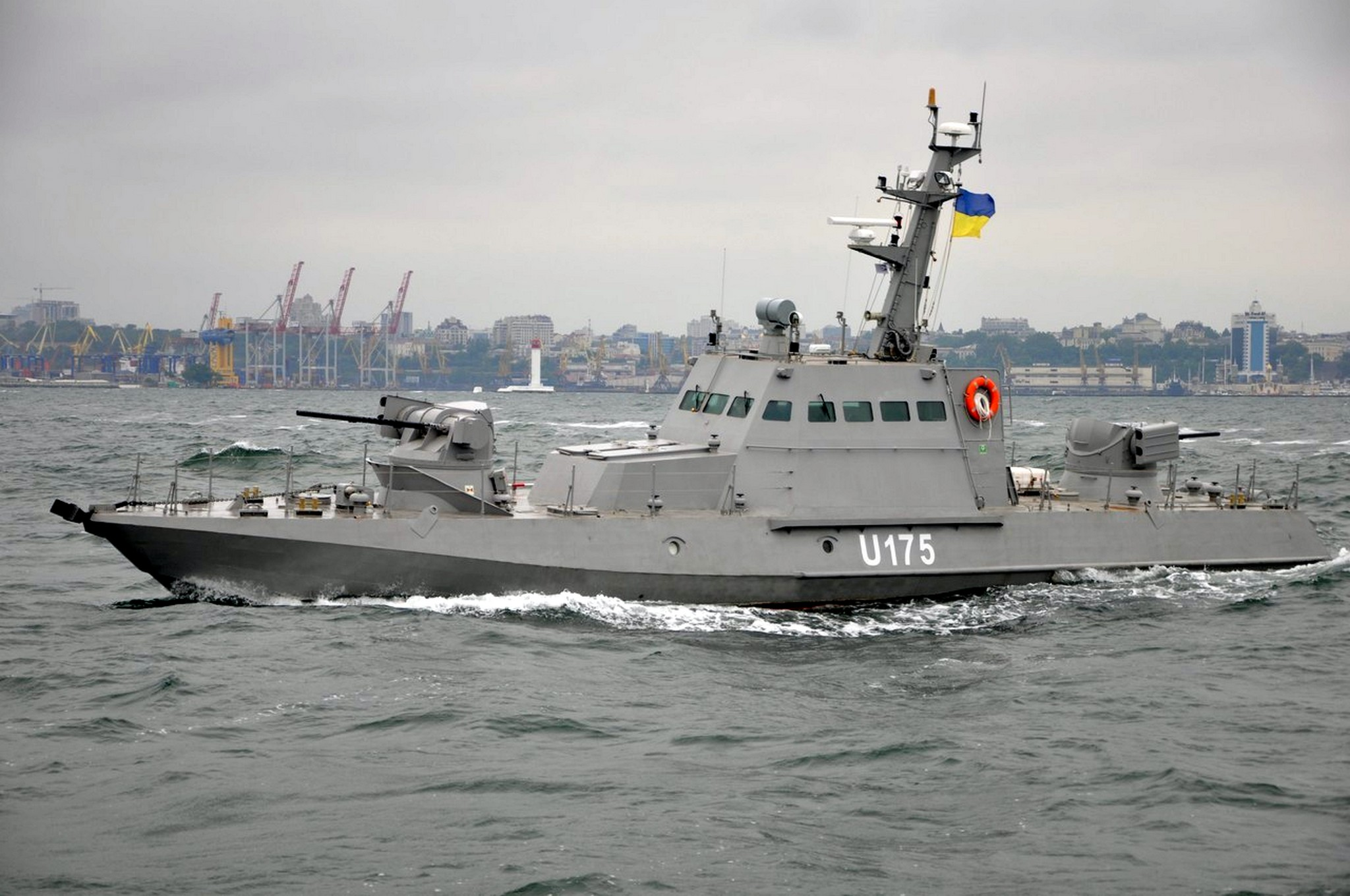
Gyurza-M-class artillery boat

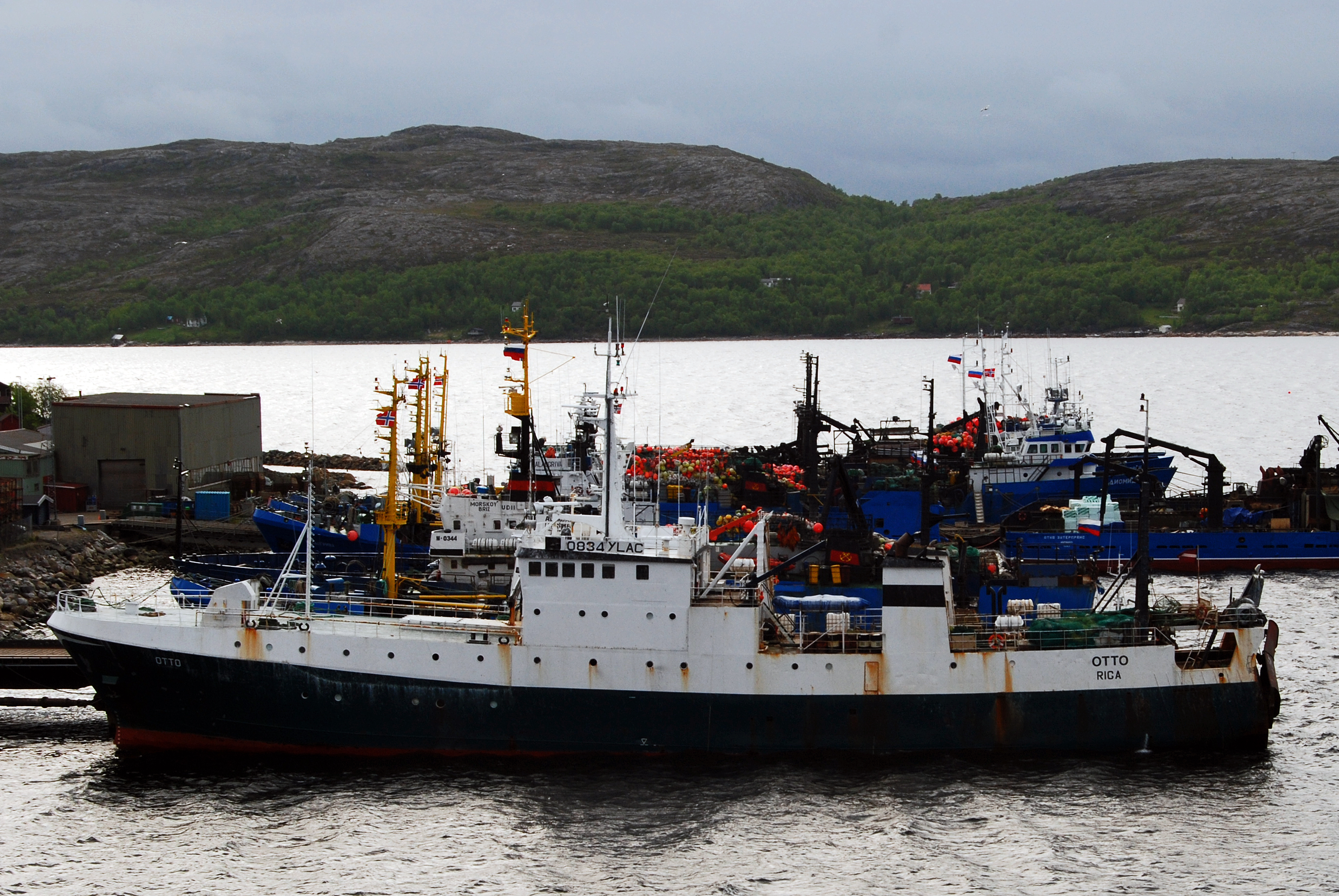
Project 502EM, fishing vessel

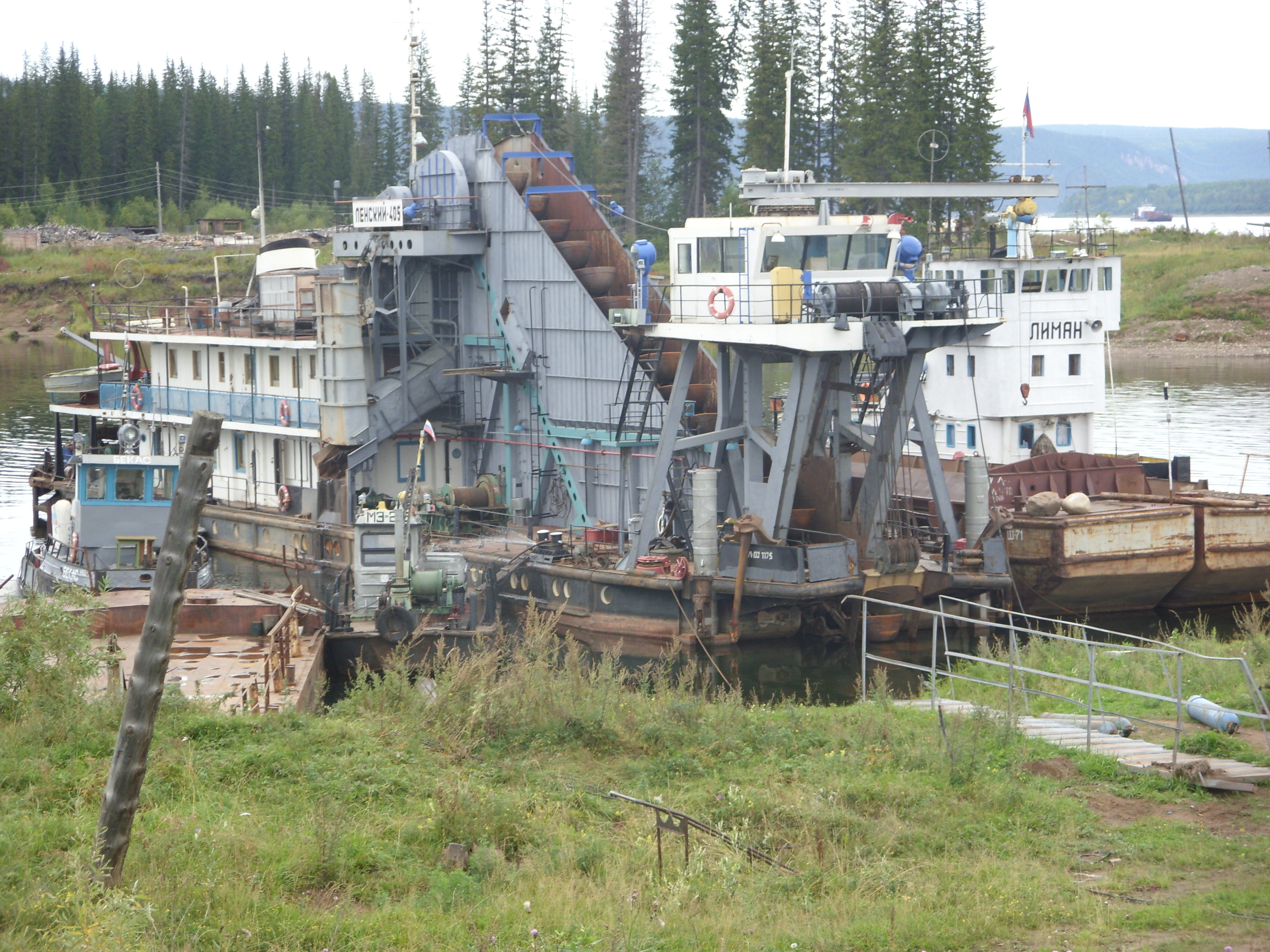
1499-class dredging vessel

== See also ==
- Sudnobudivna (Kyiv Metro)
