= List of active Ukrainian Navy ships =

Naval ensign of Ukraine

This is a list of vessels used by Ukrainian Navy. It includes main naval ships and cutters which are in service or were recently unlisted in the Ukrainian Navy as well as the auxiliary fleet, and lists ships' project numbers where a written class is unavailable or not notable – these are used by the designers to note each ship's type. As of December 2007, the Navy had 27 combat ships and cutters. Some 30 years after the fall of the Soviet Union, the main warships of the Ukrainian Navy are former Black Sea Fleet vessels that were designed and built in the Soviet Union.

Having several shipyards on its territory, the shipbuilding industry of Ukraine was mostly stalled after the fall of the Soviet Union. Following the Orange Revolution, on 9 August 2005 the Cabinet of Ukraine allocated some funding for the first major national program "Corvette" that was initiated by Minister of Defense Anatoliy Hrytsenko. The first warship-class built in the independent Ukraine was expected to produce its first vessel in 2016.

As of 24 March 2014, all of the larger ships but one (the Ukrainian frigate Hetman Sahaydachniy) of the Ukrainian Navy were captured by the Russian Black Sea Fleet. Some ships Russia returned to Ukraine (35 vessels in total). In 2015 Ukraine received 5 small (7 and 11 meter aluminum) Willard Marine patrol boats; the original order was placed in 2013.

During the 2022 Russian invasion of Ukraine, the frigate Hetman Sahaidachny was scuttled by her crew and at least a dozen ships were reported captured or destroyed. In June 2022, the Navy announced that a number of boats had been mobilised, equipped for military needs and inducted into their newly announced river flotilla of 19 vessels; at least 8 vessels not previously known to be in the Navy were shown in the accompanying videos (one of which was previously a pleasure boat). Along with these 8 were 2 unidentified RIBs (which may have been pre-existing Navy vessels), 1 unidentified harbour patrol vessel and 1 other unidentified vessel. The 8 identified vessels are listed below, although it is possible that the 2 PO-2 boats among them were pre-existing Navy vessels which had their pennant numbers painted over. A subsequent video announcing the inclusion of a SHERP the Shuttle landing craft in the flotilla showed at least 2 more unidentified harbour patrol vessels. In 2022 Ukraine start developing MAGURA V5 drones, they became operational in 2023.

== Surface fleet ==
Commissioned vessels of the Ukrainian Navy are listed below. This does not include minor non-commissioned vessels such as riverine patrol boats, rigid hull inflatable boats or unmanned surface vehicles.

Surface fleet
Amphibious warfare (1)
Class	Ship	No.	Image	Commissioned	Displacement	Type	Homeport	Note
Kentavr Project 58181	Malyn	L452		2019	47	Fast attack craft	Ochakiv	Failed to pass state tests as of 6 February 2022. In commission with the Navy since 2019, but not included in its active combat fleet at that time. Between then and April 2022, accepted into active service. A Centaur-LK boat was damaged in port by a Russian missile strike. Active as of May 2026
Mine warfare (1 + 5)
Class	Ship	No.	Image	Commissioned	Displacement	Type	Homeport	Note
Sandown	Chernihiv	M310		2023	590	Minehunter	Indefinitely based in the United Kingdom due to the Montreux Convention Regarding the Regime of the Straits.	Former Royal Navy ships HMS Grimsby and HMS Shoreham. Former Royal Netherlands Navy ships HNLMS Vlaardingen (M863) and HNLMS Makkum (M857). Former Belgian Navy ship BNS Narcis (M923). Ships remain in the United Kingdom indefinitely under contracts with Babcock International.
Sandown	Cherkasy	M311		2023	590	Minehunter	Indefinitely based in the United Kingdom due to the Montreux Convention Regarding the Regime of the Straits.	Former Royal Navy ships HMS Grimsby and HMS Shoreham. Former Royal Netherlands Navy ships HNLMS Vlaardingen (M863) and HNLMS Makkum (M857). Former Belgian Navy ship BNS Narcis (M923). Ships remain in the United Kingdom indefinitely under contracts with Babcock International.
Tripartite	Melitopol	M312		2025	510	Minehunter	Indefinitely based in the United Kingdom due to the Montreux Convention Regarding the Regime of the Straits.	Former Royal Navy ships HMS Grimsby and HMS Shoreham. Former Royal Netherlands Navy ships HNLMS Vlaardingen (M863) and HNLMS Makkum (M857). Former Belgian Navy ship BNS Narcis (M923). Ships remain in the United Kingdom indefinitely under contracts with Babcock International.
Tripartite	Mariupol	M313		2025	536	Minehunter	Indefinitely based in the United Kingdom due to the Montreux Convention Regarding the Regime of the Straits.	Former Royal Navy ships HMS Grimsby and HMS Shoreham. Former Royal Netherlands Navy ships HNLMS Vlaardingen (M863) and HNLMS Makkum (M857). Former Belgian Navy ship BNS Narcis (M923). Ships remain in the United Kingdom indefinitely under contracts with Babcock International.
Tripartite	Henichensk	M314		2025	510	Minehunter	Indefinitely based in the United Kingdom due to the Montreux Convention Regarding the Regime of the Straits.	Former Royal Navy ships HMS Grimsby and HMS Shoreham. Former Royal Netherlands Navy ships HNLMS Vlaardingen (M863) and HNLMS Makkum (M857). Former Belgian Navy ship BNS Narcis (M923). Ships remain in the United Kingdom indefinitely under contracts with Babcock International.
Bereza Project 130	Balta	M361		1987	2,096	Minehunter	Odesa	Former Soviet Navy degaussing ship with pennant U811. Vessel returned to the Ukrainian Navy from Crimea in April 2014 Damaged in a storm after hitting the pier at Snake Island in 2021. Returned to service in 2022.
Coastal & fast patrol (15)
Class	Ship	No.	Image	Commissioned	Displacement	Type	Homeport	Note
Matka Project 206MR	Pryluky	P153		1980	257	Patrol boat	Odesa	Converted into a patrol boat with the removal of its P-15 Termit anti-ship missile launch capability.
Zhuk Project 1400M	Skadovsk	P170		1990	39.7	Patrol boat	Odesa	Current status unknown. In refit in Mykolaiv as of late 2021. Previously named Haidamaka.
PO-2 Project 376	AK-03	P171		1972	46.4	Patrol boat	Ochakiv	1 unidentified PO-2 small patrol gunboat destroyed by a Russian ZALA Lancet strike no later than 17 April 2023
PO-2 Project 376	Rivne	P172		1972	46.4	Patrol boat	Ochakiv	1 unidentified PO-2 small patrol gunboat destroyed by a Russian ZALA Lancet strike no later than 17 April 2023
PO-2 Project 376	AK-02	P173		1973	46.4	Patrol boat	Ochakiv	1 unidentified PO-2 small patrol gunboat destroyed by a Russian ZALA Lancet strike no later than 17 April 2023
Gyurza-M Project 58155	Berdyansk	P175		2016	54	Patrol boat	Odesa	Berdyansk and Nikopol captured in the Kerch Strait incident and returned to the Ukrainian Navy on 18 November 2019.
Gyurza-M Project 58155	Nikopol	P176		2018	54	Patrol boat	Odesa	Damaged by a Russian Lancet loitering munition while patrolling the Dnieper River in November 2022. Returned to service in the Ochakiv area in June 2023 after repairs.
Gyurza-M Project 58155	Kostopil	P180		2020	54	Patrol boat	Odesa	
Gyurza-M Project 58155	Bucha	P181		2023	54	Patrol boat	Kyiv	
NAVY 18 WP	Irpin	P182		2024		Patrol boat	Odesa	Current status unknown. One vessel possibly damaged in combat in 2024. Former Estonian Navy ship. Transferred to the Ukrainian Navy in 2024.
NAVY 18 WP	Reni	P183		2024		Patrol boat	Odesa	Current status unknown. One vessel possibly damaged in combat in 2024. Former Estonian Navy ship. Transferred to the Ukrainian Navy in 2024.
Island	Starobilsk	P191		2019	164	Patrol boat	Odesa	Former US Coast Guard cutters USCGC Drummond, USCGC Ocracoke and USCGC Washington Unidentified Island-class patrol boat damaged in a Russian Lancet strike in March 2024 near Mykolaiv.
Island	Sumy	P192		2021	164	Patrol boat	Odesa	Former US Coast Guard cutters USCGC Drummond, USCGC Ocracoke and USCGC Washington Unidentified Island-class patrol boat damaged in a Russian Lancet strike in March 2024 near Mykolaiv.
Island	Fastiv	P193		2021	164	Patrol boat	Odesa	Former US Coast Guard cutters USCGC Drummond, USCGC Ocracoke and USCGC Washington Unidentified Island-class patrol boat damaged in a Russian Lancet strike in March 2024 near Mykolaiv.
Flamingo Project 1415	Hola Prystan	P241		1986	57	Patrol boat	Odesa	

== Auxiliary fleet ==
Auxiliary fleet
Intelligence & research (1)
Class	Ship	No.	Image	Commissioned	Displacement	Type	Homeport	Note
Muna Project 1824B	Pereyaslav	A512		1986	912	Spy ship	Ochakiv	Possibly damaged in combat in 2022.
Transport & supply (6)
Class	Ship	No.	Image	Commissioned	Displacement	Type	Homeport	Note
Project 1849	Horlivka	A753		1965	2,178	Freight ship	Ochakiv	Vessel returned to the Ukrainian Navy from Crimea in April 2014
Project 1430	Chornomorsk	A783		1976	99.7	Crew supply vessel	Odesa	Vessel returned to the Ukrainian Navy from Crimea by June 2014 (inclusive) at the latest
Sura Project 419	Shostka	A852		1976	3,151.4	AHTS vessel	Odesa	Laid up. Vessel returned to the Ukrainian Navy from Crimea in April 2014
Project 1387	Korosten	A853		1965	52.5	Dispatch cutter	Odesa	Laid up.
Bryza Project 772U	Dobropillya	A854		1975	142.6	Dispatch cutter	Ochakiv	Vessel returned to the Ukrainian Navy from Crimea by June 2014 (inclusive) at the latest Previously a training boat
Bryza Project 772U	Pivdennyi	A855		1974	142.6	Dispatch cutter	Odesa	
Search & rescue (2)
Class	Ship	No.	Image	Commissioned	Displacement	Type	Homeport	Note
Project 2262	Oleksandr Okhrimenko	A715		1987	2,258	Search and rescue vessel	Odesa	In refit. In refit at Nibulon Shipyard as of 2021.
Project SK620	Sokal	A782		1983	235.9	Ambulance vessel	Odesa	In refit. In refit at Nibulon Shipyard as of 2021.
Diving support (6)
Class	Ship	No.	Image	Commissioned	Displacement	Type	Homeport	Note
Yelva Project 535M	Netishyn	A700		1973	285	Diving support vessel	Odesa	
Yelva Project 535M	Pochaiv	A701		1975	285	Diving support vessel	Odesa	
Flamingo Project 1415	Volodimir Volinsk	A721		1983	43.2	Diving support vessel	Odesa	Laid up.
Flamingo Project 1415	Romni	A732		1980	43.2	Diving support vessel	Odesa	Laid up. Vessel returned to the Ukrainian Navy from Crimea on 3 May 2014
PO-2 Project 376	RVK-258	A724		1968	38.2	Diving support vessel	Odesa	
PO-2 Project 376		A734		1974	46.89	Diving support vessel	Odesa	
Tug (1)
Class	Ship	No.	Image	Commissioned	Displacement	Type	Homeport	Note
Prometey Project 498	Jani Kapu	A947		1974	303	Seagoing tug	Odesa	Vessel returned to the Ukrainian Navy from Crimea by June 2014 (inclusive) at the latest Vessel recaptured in the Kerch Strait incident and returned to the Ukrainian Navy on 18 November 2019
Training (2)
Class	Ship	No.	Image	Commissioned	Displacement	Type	Homeport	Note
Petrushka Project UK-3	Smila	A541		1985	345.4	Training boat	Odesa	Vessel returned to the Ukrainian Navy from Crimea by June 2014 (inclusive) at the latest
Petrushka Project UK-3	Nova Kakhovka	A542		1986	345.4	Training boat	Odesa	Vessel returned to the Ukrainian Navy from Crimea by June 2014 (inclusive) at the latest
Special purpose boats and barges (3)
Project 20641	Baikal			1984	1,101.16	Water barge		
Project 889A	Plavmasterskaja			1983	1,354	Float ship/repair barge		
Project 50479	PZh-61			2020	-	Floating dock		

== Non-commissioned vessels ==
A number of non-commissioned auxiliary vessels are used for a number of littoral and support purposes.

Class	Photo	Type	Ships	Displacement (Note: Full load (in long tons))	Shipyard	Commissioned	Note
CB90		Patrol boat	3 vessels	20	(Sweden)	2025	
40 PB (Note: Also known as 40 Defiant)		Small patrol boats	6 vessels	—N/a	(United States) Metal Shark	2020/2022–2022/2022	In June 2022, 6 40-foot maritime combat patrol boats were announced as part of a package of 18 coastal and riverine patrol boats to be drawn down from US stocks and sent to Ukraine by the United States. Metal Shark later confirmed the boats were of this class. Boats of this class were not previously announced to be joining the Ukrainian Sea Guard
Sea Ark Dauntless		Small patrol boats	10 vessels (Note: In November 2022, the Ukrainian Navy released footage of at least one unidentified patrol boat which they claimed was in the Black Sea. Military analyst Taras Chmut implied that all 18 manned patrol boats initially pledged to Ukraine by the US were in service. Upon finding evidence that the 40 PB-class small patrol boats were in service, the Ukrainian publication Telegraf had earlier speculated that the other manned patrol boats initially pledged to Ukraine by the US were probably in service Later that month, Militarnyi confirmed that Sea Ark Dauntless boats were in active service.)	11	(United States) Sea Ark Marine	2002/2022–2011/2022	Announced as part of a package of 18 coastal and riverine patrol boats to be sent to Ukraine by the United States
Small unit riverine craft		Small patrol boats	2 vessels	9.82	(United States) Raytheon/SAFE Boats International/Boat Master	2004/2022–2005/2022	Announced as part of a package of 18 coastal and riverine patrol boats to be sent to Ukraine by the United States
SHERP the Shuttle		Small landing craft	1 vessel	12.88	—N/a	2022 (Note: Assuming this boat was not previously in civilian commission)	
Uisko		Small landing craft	3 vessels	10		2024	
Metal Shark		Rigid inflatable, 7-metre speed boats	10 vessels	—N/a	(United States) Metal Shark	2021	
Wing		RIB	74 vessels	—N/a	(United States) Wing	2021	
Willard		RIB	2 vessels of type Sea Force 11M 3 vessels of type Sea Force 730 2 vessels of type Sea Force 7M	4 3 3	(United States) Willard Marine	2015 2010	
Chibis (project 14100)		Small rescue boat	1 vessel	2.2	(Soviet Union) Sosnovka|	Mobilised in 2022. Previously a pleasure boat	
Richkovi tramva (Note: No project number, but similar to Kashtan (project D-055))		Supply vessels		—N/a	Unknown	Mobilised in 2022.	
(project 371)		Crew cutters	U500-5 (Note: project 371U) (Note: U500-4 and U500-5 were boats of A500 Donbas, and were likely stationed with it when it was captured during the annexation of Crimea. In addition to the 33 named vessels out of the 35 confirmed to have been returned from Crimea, two unspecified smaller boats were returned. U500-4 and U500-5 remain in service and were probably the two boats in question.)	9.83	Soviet Union	Unknown	Vessels returned to the Ukrainian Navy from Crimea by June 2014 (inclusive) at the latest
(project 371)		Crew cutters	A001 Admiralsky	9.83	Soviet Union	1984	Vessels returned to the Ukrainian Navy from Crimea by June 2014 (inclusive) at the latest
(project 371)		Crew cutters	A927 RK-1039 (Note: project 371bis)	8.87	Soviet Union	Unknown	
Aist (project 1398B)		Small patrol boats	A905 RK-1720	20	Soviet Union	1991	
Aist (project 1398B)		Small patrol boats	Head no. 9008	20	(Soviet Union) Batumi	1990	
Sokolenok (project 1404)		Harbour patrol	A237	8.8	(Soviet Union) Redan Shipyard, Leningrad	Unknown	
Strizh (project 1390)		Harbour patrol	U500-4 (Note: project 13901)	3.2	—N/a	Unknown	Vessel returned to the Ukrainian Navy from Crimea by June 2014 (inclusive) at the latest

== Prospective additions ==
In November 2022, the US pledged 40 armored river boats of unspecified type (from industry). By May 2023, this number had risen to 44. In March 2023, Germany pledged 10 unmanned surface vessels of unspecified type to Ukraine.

Class	Photo	Type	Ships	Displacement (Note: Figures apply for individual, finished vessels of these types, and are accurate to no more than 2 decimal places)	Number	Shipyard	Origin	Designed	Status
Awaiting delivery
Island		Patrol boats	P194 Viacheslav Kubrak	168	3	Bollinger Shipyards	United States	United States	Was to be received in January 2022 after being tested, but as of 17 June 2022, delivery is not yet completed due to the Russian invasion of Ukraine
Island		Patrol boats	Unknown	168	3	Bollinger Shipyards	United States	United States	Announced as military aid to be sent to Ukraine by the United States; 2 more boats were planned for inclusion in a 7-strong division of Ukraine’s Island-class patrol boats prior to the Russian invasion of Ukraine
Island		Patrol boats	Unknown	168	3	Bollinger Shipyards	United States	United States	Announced as military aid to be sent to Ukraine by the United States; 2 more boats were planned for inclusion in a 7-strong division of Ukraine’s Island-class patrol boats prior to the Russian invasion of Ukraine
Fleet-class unmanned surface vessel (Note: The most likely class of unmanned surface vehicles to be delivered)		Unmanned surface vehicles	Unknown	7.6	Unknown	AAI Corporation	United States	United States	Unmanned surface vehicles announced as military aid to be sent to Ukraine by the United States in April 2022
Under construction
Ada		Corvettes	Hetman Ivan Mazepa; Laid down in 2021	2362.10	2	Okean Shipyard	Turkey/Ukraine (Note: Construction of both vessels to be finished in Turkey)	Turkey	Contract signed (2020); first ship to enter service in 2024; Hetman Ivan Mazepa launched in October 2022
Ada		Corvettes	Hetman Ivan Vyhovsky Laid down in 2023	2362.10	2	Okean Shipyard	Turkey/Ukraine	Turkey	Contract signed (2020)
Mark VI patrol boat		Patrol boats	2 under construction 10 to be completed and delivered to the Navy by 2026	63.97	10-16	SAFE Boats International	United States	United States	Up to 16 may be acquired for 600 mln dollars, details are being discussed 10 ordered so far

== See also ==
- List of former ships of the Ukrainian Navy
- Ukrainian Sea Guard
