= Ukrainian patrol vessel Sloviansk =

Former Island-class patrol boat

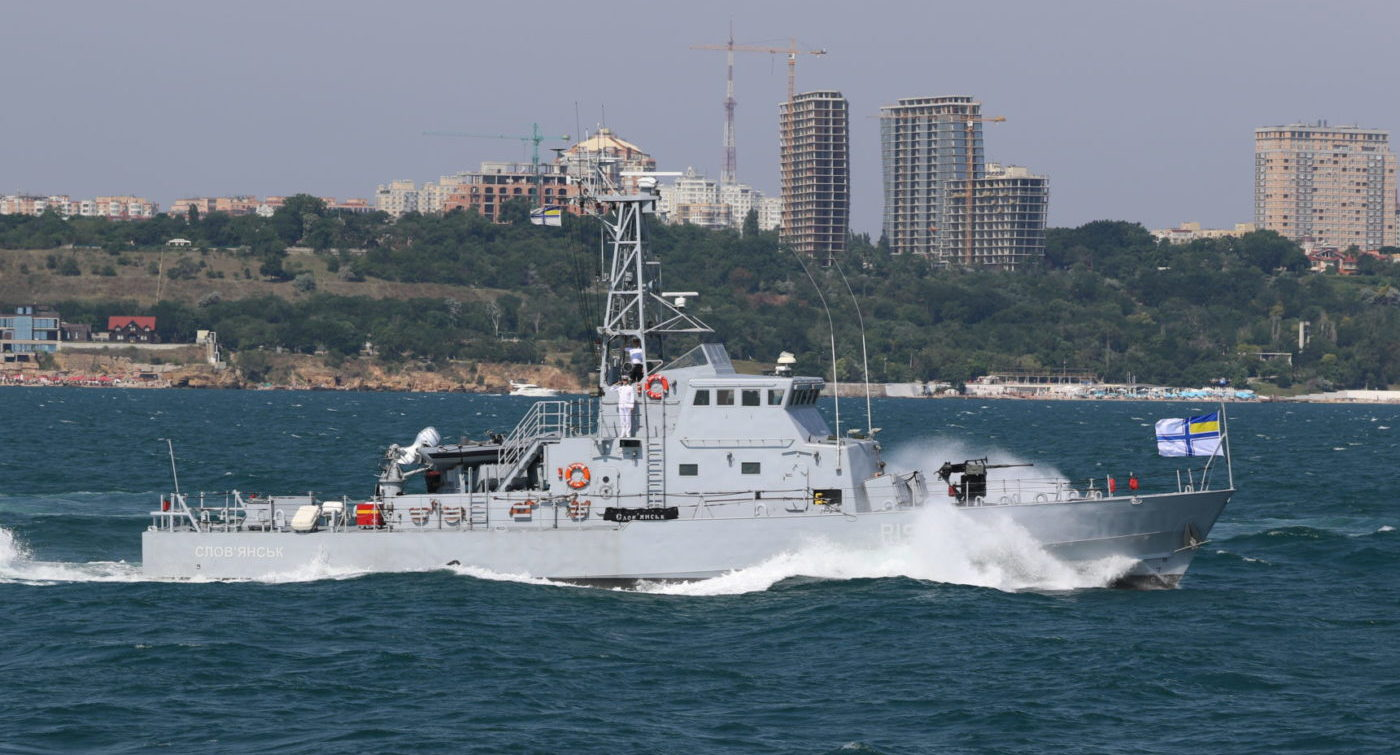
- Sloviansk

History

United States
- Name: USCGC Cushing
- Namesake: Cushing Island, Maine
- Commissioned: 4 August 1988
- Decommissioned: 8 March 2017
- Identification: MMSI number: Unknown; Callsign: NOFR
- Fate: Sold to Ukraine on Sep 18, 2018

Ukraine
- Name: Sloviansk
- Namesake: Sloviansk
- Acquired: 27 September 2018
- In service: 13 November 2019
- Identification: Pennant number: P190
- Fate: Sunk by Russian military aircraft on 3 March 2022

General characteristics
- Class & type: Island-class patrol boat
- Displacement: 168 long tons (171 t)
- Length: 110 ft (34 m)
- Beam: 21 ft (6.4 m)
- Propulsion: 2 diesel engines
- Speed: 28 knots (52 km/h; 32 mph)
- Complement: 2 officers, 14 enlisted
- Armament: 1 × 25mm Mk38 autocannon (USCGC Cushing); 2 × .50 cal M2 machine guns (USCGC Cushing); 1 × 25mm 110-PM autocannon (Sloviansk)

The Ukrainian patrol vessel Sloviansk (P190) was an Island-class patrol boat of the Naval Forces of the Armed Forces of Ukraine. Originally named USCGC Cushing when in service with the United States Coast Guard, the vessel was acquired by Ukraine in 2018 and arrived in Ukraine on 21 October 2019. Sloviansk was sunk in combat on 3 March 2022 by a Russian air-to-surface missile.

She was built at Bollinger Shipyards in Lockport, Louisiana, in early 1988 and commissioned on 4 August 1988, at Coast Guard Base Mobile, Alabama.

== Design and construction ==
The Island-class patrol boats, including Cushing/Sloviansk, were constructed in Bollinger Shipyards, Lockport, Louisiana. Members of the class have an overall length of 110 feet (34 m). They have a beam of 21 feet (6.4 m) and, at the time of construction, a draft of 7 feet (2.1 m). The patrol boats have a displacement of 154 long tons (156 t) at full load and 137 long tons (139 t) at half load. They are powered by two Paxman Valenta 16 CM diesel engines or two Caterpillar 3516 diesel engines. They have two 99 kilowatts (135 PS; 133 shp) 3304T diesel generators made by Caterpillar; these can serve as motor–generators. Their hulls are constructed from highly strong steel, and the superstructure and major deck are constructed from aluminium.

The Island-class patrol boats have maximum sustained speeds of 29.5 knots (54.6 km/h; 33.9 mph). They are fitted with satellite navigation systems, collision avoidance systems, surface radar, and a Loran C system. They have a range of 3,330 miles (2,890 nmi; 5,360 km) and an endurance of five days. Their complement is sixteen (two officers and fourteen crew members). Island-class patrol boats are based on Vosper Thornycroft 33-metre (108 ft) patrol boats and have similar dimensions.

In U.S. service, Cushing was fitted with one 25-millimetre (0.98 in) machine gun and two 7.62-millimetre (0.300 in) M60 light machine guns; it could also be fitted with two Browning .50 caliber machine guns. In Ukrainian service, Sloviansk was armed with a Soviet-era 110-PM autocannon.

== Service history ==
=== United States Coast Guard ===
Cushing was commissioned on Coast Guard Day, 4 August 1988, named after Cushing Island, located near Portland, Maine. Throughout her service life, she would partake in a number of humanitarian and military operations. Cushing primarily supported the United States Coast Guard's search and rescue, law enforcement, living marine resources, and counter drug and illegal migrant missions in the Gulf of Mexico, Caribbean Sea, and the Atlantic. Cushing was homeported in Alabama, Puerto Rico, and North Carolina during her Coast Guard service.

Cushing was involved in Operation Uphold Democracy, the American backed military intervention in Haiti following the 1991 Haitian coup d'état. In 1994, Cushing was among the 55 Coast Guard cutters operating in support of Operation Able Manner and Operation Able Vigil. These patrols consisted of border security operations, and resulted in the rescue and repatriation of over 63,000 Haitian and Cuban migrants. This was the largest United States Coast Guard operation since the Vietnam War.

Cushing was later transferred to Atlantic Beach, North Carolina, where her primary focus was fisheries and marine law enforcement, as well as search and rescue.

On 8 March 2017 Cushing was decommissioned along with USCGC Nantucket in North Carolina. Two Sentinel-class cutters replaced both cutters the following year. Cushing was laid up in the Coast Guard Yard near Baltimore, Maryland.

=== Ukrainian Naval Forces ===
In September 2018, Ukraine was selected to receive the Cushing, as well as her sister ship Drummond through the United States Navy International Programs Office, as part of military aid to the country. The Island-class patrol boat was the first major commissioned ship built in the United States operated by the Ukrainian Navy, which up to this point was composed largely of ships inherited from the breakup of the Soviet Black Sea Fleet into the Russian Black Sea Fleet and the Ukrainian Navy. As a result, the two ships were brought out of storage, and received maintenance and equipment upgrades. Cushing and Drummond were transported to the Black Sea port city of Odesa aboard the Ocean Freedom dry cargo ship, arriving on 21 October 2019.

In Ukrainian service, Cushing was renamed to Sloviansk, in memory of the home town of sailors Roman Napriagila and Sergiy Mayboroda and was subordinate to the 30th Surface Ships Division.

==== Sinking ====
On 3 March 2022, during the Russian invasion of Ukraine, Sloviansk was conducting reconnaissance and patrol missions around the port cities of Odesa, Chornomorsk and Yuzhne. During this period, the vessel was reportedly sunk by a Russian Kh-31 anti-ship missile. The fate of the crew has not been reported.

== See also ==
- Ukrainian patrol vessel Starobilsk
- Ukrainian patrol vessel Sumy
- Ukrainian patrol vessel Fastiv
