= Kurortne =

Kurortne (Ukrainian: Курортне) may refer to several places in Ukraine:

- Kurortne, Bilohirsk Raion, Crimea, village in Bilohirsk Raion
- Kurortne, Feodosia Municipality, Crimea, urban-type settlement in Feodosia Municipality
- Kurortne, Lenine Raion, Crimea, village in Lenine Raion
- Kurortne, Chuhuiv Raion, Kharkiv Oblast, village in Chuhuiv Raion
- Kurortne, Kharkiv Raion, Kharkiv Oblast, rural settlement in Kharkiv Raion
- Kurortne, Odesa Oblast, village in Bilhorod-Dnistrovskyi Raion
