= Kurortny =

Kurortny (Russian: Курортный; masculine), Kurortnaya (Курортная; feminine), or Kurortnoye (Курортное; neuter) is the name of several inhabited localities in Russia.

Urban localities

- Kurortnoye, Feodosiya, Republic of Crimea, an urban-type settlement under the administrative jurisdiction of the town of republic significance of Feodosiya in the Republic of Crimea

Rural localities

- Kurortnoye, Belogorsky District, Republic of Crimea, a selo in Belogorsky District of the Republic of Crimea
- Kurortnoye, Leninsky District, Republic of Crimea, a selo in Leninsky District of the Republic of Crimea
- Kurortnoye, Chernyakhovsky District, Kaliningrad Oblast, a settlement in Kamensky Rural Okrug of Chernyakhovsky District in Kaliningrad Oblast
- Kurortnoye, Pravdinsky District, Kaliningrad Oblast, a settlement under the administrative jurisdiction of the town of district significance of Pravdinsk in Pravdinsky District of Kaliningrad Oblast
