= Ukrainian patrol boat Hola Prystan =

Flamingo class (project R1415) anti-sabotage boat of the Ukrainian Navy

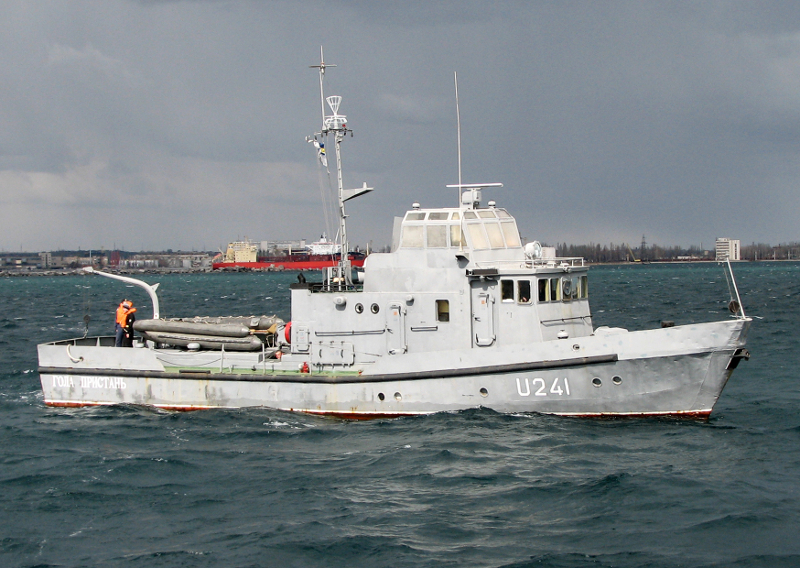
- Hola Prystan in 2011

History

Soviet Union
- Builder: Sosnovka Shipyard
- Yard number: 59
- Launched: 1986
- Commissioned: 1986
- In service: 1986
- Out of service: 1 August 1997
- Fate: Transferred to Ukraine 1 August 1997

Ukraine
- Name: Hola Prystan
- Namesake: Hola Prystan
- Operator: Ukrainian Navy
- In service: 1 August 1997
- Renamed: 1997
- Refit: 2015, 2020
- Home port: Western Naval Base "South", OdesaMUN А2951
- Identification: Pennant number: P241 (2018-present); U241(1997-2018)

General characteristics
- Class & type: Flamingo class Patrol boat
- Displacement: 31.8 long tons (32 t) standard; 57 long tons (58 t) full load
- Length: 21.2 m (69 ft 7 in)
- Beam: 3.93 m (12 ft 11 in)
- Draft: 1.4 m (4 ft 7 in)
- Installed power: 1 auxiliary 300 hp 3D12L diesel generator
- Speed: 12 knots (22 km/h; 14 mph)
- Range: 800 nmi (1,500 km; 920 mi) at 9 kn (17 km/h; 10 mph); 200 nmi (370 km; 230 mi) at 11 kn (20 km/h; 13 mph)
- Endurance: 5 days
- Boats & landing craft carried: At least one rigid lifeboat.
- Capacity: 17 long tons (17 t) of cargo or 27 passengers
- Complement: 8
- Armament: 1 14.5mm marine pedestal machine gun mount

Hola Prystan (P241) (Ukrainian: Гола Пристань) is a Project R1415 (NATO code: Flamingo class) anti-sabotage boat of the Ukrainian Navy. Built in 1986, she has been in Ukrainian Navy service since 1997.

== History ==
=== 1986-1997 ===
In 1986, the harbor boat Project R1415 Flamingo class was laid down at Sosnovka Shipyard, yard #59, Sosnovka Kirov Oblast. The ship began service with the Black Sea Fleet of the Soviet Navy in the same year.

From 1995 to August 1997, the ship was part of the joint Russo-Ukrainian Black Sea Fleet under a bilateral command (and Soviet Navy flag).

=== 1997-2014 ===
On 28 May 1997, Russia and Ukraine signed several agreements regarding the fleet including the Partition Treaty. This finally established an independent Ukrainian Navy and transferred the ship to its control. On 1 August 1997, the boat was renamed U241 Hola Prystan after the town in Kherson Oblast, Hola Prystan.

In 2012, Hola Prystan was serving as part of 1st separate division of protection and maintenance of the water area.

In January 2013, when 24th separate River Boat Division based in Western Naval Base "South" was created, Hola Prystan was assigned to that unit.

On 7 February 2013, Hola Prystan took part in ensuring the survivability of ships exercise. Under command of Senior lieutenant Oleksii Melnyk, the crew trained to provide assistance to a destroyed ship.

In May 2014, the ship took part in a two-day exercise, along with 5 other ships.

=== 2014-present ===
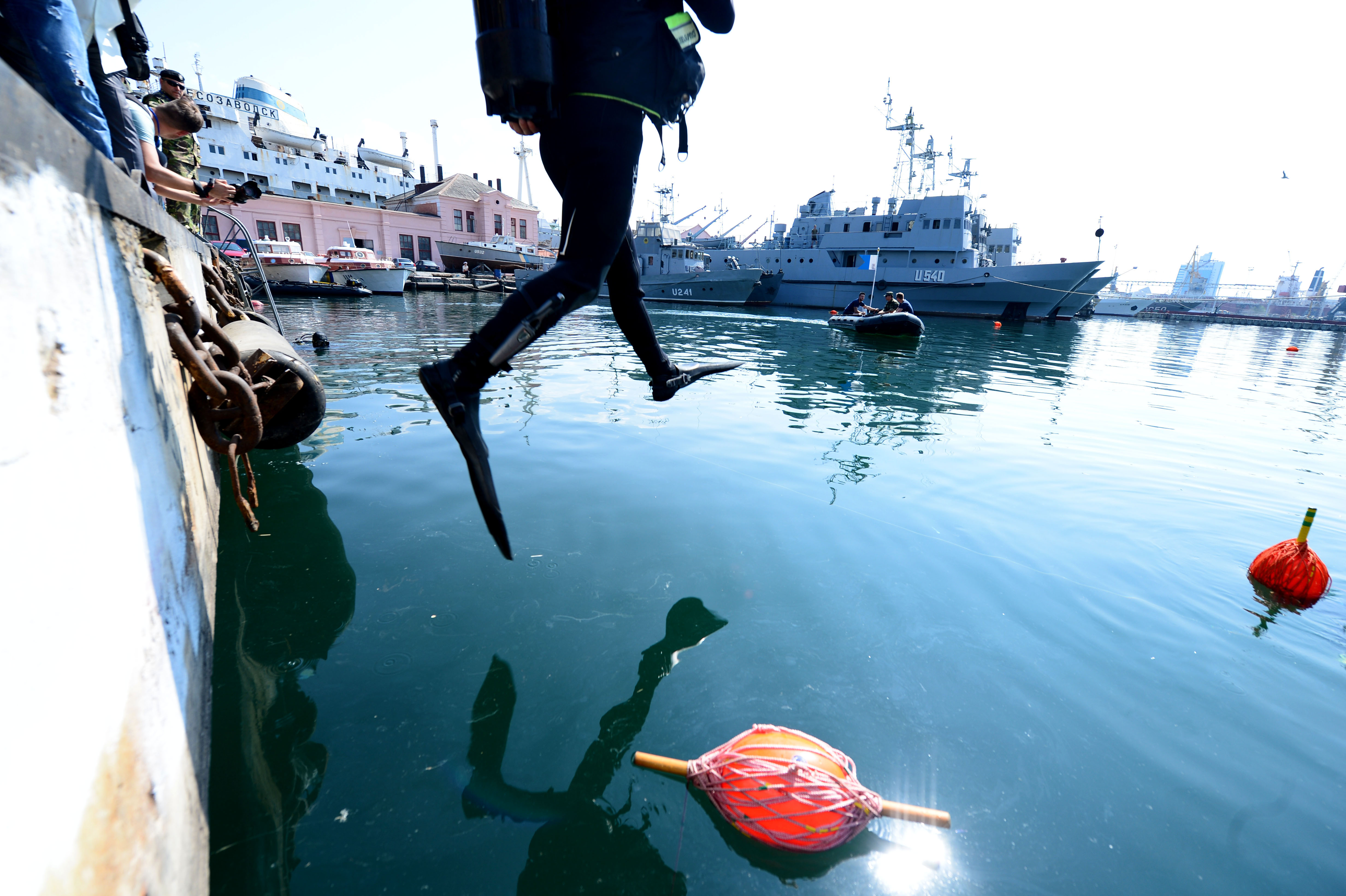
Sea Breeze 2016 exercise

During the annexation of Crimea by the Russian Federation in March 2014, many Ukrainian Navy vessels were captured by Russian forces. Hola Prystan was one of 10 ships that remained under Ukrainian control.

When in 2014, the 24th River Boat Division was disbanded, its former units were transferred to 1st Division of Protection and Security.

The ship underwent major repairs in Shipyard Ukraina in Odesa during 2015. Repairs began in August.

In 2018, the ship's pennant number was changed from U241 to P241. Hola Prystan also took part in annual Exercise Sea Breeze.

Senior Lieutenant Pavlo Hladchenko was commander of the ship prior to August 2019. He was then sent to US to take command and train with crew of Ukrainian patrol vessel Starobilsk.

On September 24, 2019, a Turkish Coast Guard SAR35 type boat TCSG71 visited Odesa and was escorted by Hola Prystan.

In September 2020, work was completed on restoring her hull structure, main engine system and many other components.

== Sources ==
- "ПСКА проект П-1415" [PSKA project P-1415], Russian Navy of the 20th century (in Russian), archived from the original on 16 February 2018
- "Гола пристань" [Hola Prystan], River and Sea Vessels' Gallery and Database, archived from the original on 2 March 2018
