= 30th Naval Surface Ships Division =

30th Surface Ships Division 1st Naval Surface Ship Brigade (1993-2018)
- 30-й дивізіон надводних кораблів
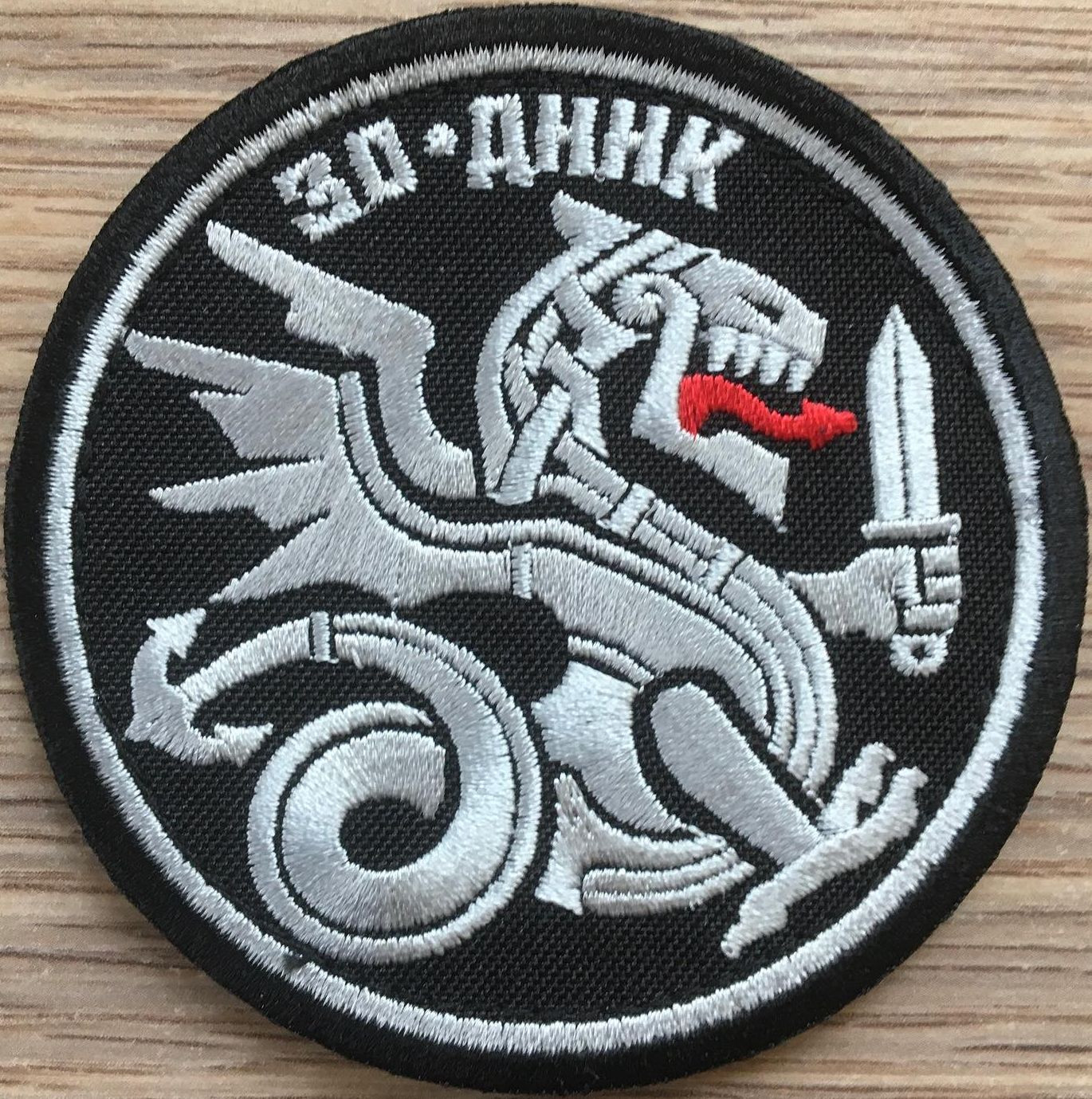
- Division Insignia
- Active: 1993 - present
- Country: Ukraine
- Branch: Ukrainian Navy
- Type: Division
- Role: Naval patrols, Coastal reconnaissance, anti sabotage operations
- Part of: Armed Forces of Ukraine
- Garrison/HQ: Western Naval Base
- Engagements: Operation Active Endeavour; Operation Ocean Shield Russo-Ukrainian War: Annexation of Crimea by the Russian Federation; War in Donbas; 2022 Russian invasion of Ukraine

Insignia
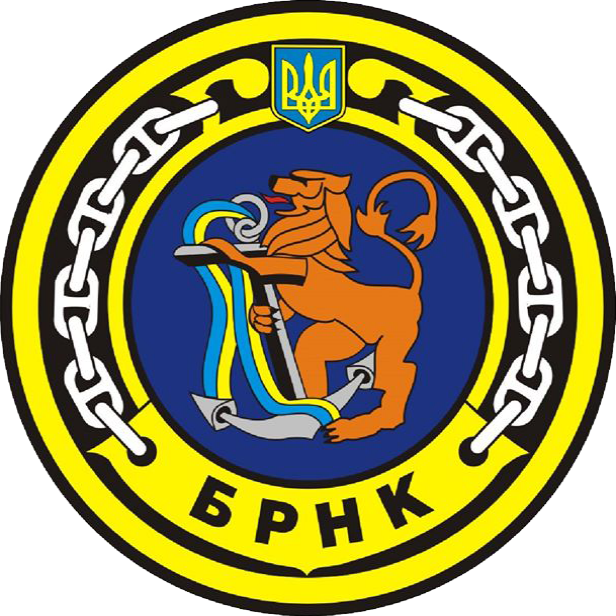
- Insignia of 1st Naval Surface Ship Brigade

The 30th Surface Ships Division formerly known as 1st Naval Surface Ship Brigade is a NATO certified division of the Ukrainian Navy. It is a combat active unit and is amongst one of the most highly active units amongst the Ukrainian Navy. It's flagship Hetman Sahaidachny was also the flagship of Ukrainian Navy. It was established in 1993 and is currently based at the Western Naval Base.

== History ==
It was established on September 1, 1993, as the 1st Naval Surface Ship Brigade of Ukrainian Navy in Sevastopol. In 2014, the brigade was relocated to Odesa, and in 2018 it was reformed per NATO standards becoming the 30th Surface Ship Division.

In 1994, the brigade's flagship Hetman Sahaidachny set sail for France to take part in the 50th-anniversary commemorations of the Allied invasion of Normandy. In fall 1995, Hetman Sahaidachny visited Abu Dhabi during the "Idex-95" exhibitions. The frigate was scheduled to visit Norfolk, Virginia in the United States with Kostiantyn Olshansky. Kostiantyn Olshansky visited, but Hetman Sahaidachny did not for unknown reasons.

The brigade's flagship Hetman Sahaidachny also visited ports in Algeria, Bulgaria, Egypt, Georgia, Gibraltar, Israel, Portugal, Russia and Turkey.

In 2008, the brigade's flagship Hetman Sahaidachny took part in "Operation Active Endeavour" in the Mediterranean Sea.

The brigade's flagship Hetman Sahaidachny joined the Naval Force of the European Union (EUNAVFOR) in early January 2014 for NATO's "Operation Ocean Shield" anti-piracy operations off the Horn of Africa. As she refueled in Greece, while Russian forces seized control of Crimea, Russian state media RT falsely reported on 1 March 2014 that the ship's crew had defected to Russia and raised the Russian flag. Shortly afterwards, the Wall Street Journal reported a Ukrainian Defense Ministry statement that the ship was still flying the Ukrainian flag in port in Crete. According to the Defense Ministry, the commander of the ship stated that the crew had never defected to the Russians. It arrived in Odesa under the Ukrainian flag on 5 March.

On 14 March 2014, the brigade's flagship Hetman Sahaidachny encountered a Russian naval group attempting to enter or having entered Ukrainian territorial waters. As Hetman Sahaidachny approached the group, they withdrew.

On March 20, 2014, during the Russian Invasion of Crimea the missile boat Pryluky of the brigade was captured and the Russian Naval flag was raised on it. It was returned to Ukraine on April 11, 2014. On 22 March 2014 Vinnystia was also seized and was returned on 19 April, after half of its crew defected to Russia.

In 2015 the brigade's missile boat Pryluky participated in the active phase of the Exercise Sea Breeze 2015.

On September 9, 2016, the brigade's flagship Hetman Sahaidachny accompanied by Akkerman and Berdyansk detected the Russian anti-submarine ship Smetliviy, Hetman Sahaidachny set up a smoke screen, under the cover of which the boats came closer to the Russian ship, separated and took it in a semi-circle. Smetliviy was forced to retreat.

At the beginning of April 2017, missile boat of the regiment Pryluky took part in an exercise "PASSEX" with TCG Gaziantep and TCG Heybeliada of the Turkish Navy.

On 31 December 2017, a smuggling ship under Tanzania flag was detected in the Black Sea on way to Kurortne travelling within Ukrainian waters so the regiment's missile boat Pryluky began its pursuit as it could not escape it finally contacted Pryluky only to refuse orders by the Ukrainian Navy, so Pryluky opened fire, Akkerman and Berdyansk along with Ukrainian Sea Guard and Security Service of Ukraine provided reinforcements and the Tanzanian vessel was taken to Odessa.

In July 2018 the division's flagship Hetman Sahaidachny participated in the Sea Breeze 2018 multinational exercises.

In May 2019, the brigade's missile boat Pryluky and Royal Navy ship HMS Echo conducted a joint PASSEX exercise in the Black Sea in accordance with NATO standards.

July 2021, the vessels Sloviansk and Starobilsk of the division took part in naval exercises with NATO vessels and were certified by NATO.

In August 2021, the vessel Sloviansk of the division conducted exercises with Ochamchiri of the Georgian Navy off the coast of Georgia.

On October 13, 2021, the division's vessel Starobilsk took part in the rescue operation of the ship Balta, which suffered a disaster near the Snake Island providing support from am emergency rescue team onboard and was successful in saving the vessel.

In November 2021, the vessel Sloviansk of the division conducted exercises in the Black Sea with the American Navy, Romanian Navy and Turkish Navy.

On February 24, 2022, in the first hours of the 2022 Russian Invasion of Ukraine the populated areas of the Black Sea region came under heavy missile fire. Sloviansk was amongst the first ships to be dispatched.

On March 3, 2022, during the Russo-Ukrainian war, the division's flagship Hetman Sahaidachny was partially sunk by the order of commander. Defense Minister Oleksiy Reznikov said that the reason for the sinking was so that the ship, undergoing repairs, shouldn't fall into the hands of the Russians. On the same day, while conducting reconnaissance near the area of the Kinburn Spit, the engine room of the division's vessel Sloviansk was hit by an Kh-31 missile and it began to sink. An emergency evacuation was carried out by a raft and many crew members were saved but eleven remained missing.

Russian media falsely claimed that a ship of the division Vinnystia was captured by Russian forces at Berdyansk. However, the ship was later sighted as capsized in the port of Ochakiv.

== Vessels ==
- Hetman Sahaidachny (Note: Partially sunk and currently inoperable)
- Pryluky
- Starobilsk
- Sloviansk (Note: Sunk)
- Sumy
- Fastiv
- Vinnytsia (Note: Capsized)

== Commanders ==
- Mykola Evgenovich Zhibarev (1994–1997)
- Ihor Yosypovych Tenyukh (1997–2001)
- Sergey Nastenko (2002–2004)
- Andriy Tarasov (2005–2007)
- Oleksiy Leonidovych Neizhpapa (2008–2012)
- Oleksiy Olegovich Doskato (2013–2015)
- Dmytro Sergeyevich Glukhov (2015–2019)
- Pavlo Hryhorovych Rud (2019-)

== Sources ==
- Військово-Морські Сили
- Особовому складу Західної військово-морської бази та бригади надводних кораблів представлено новопризначених командирів
- УКРАЇНСЬКА КУМЕДІЯ НАД ЯКОЮ СМІЮТЬСЯ В США: 13 адміралів на 2 бригади кораблів ВМС!
- Військово-морські бази ВМС
- Український флот отримав нові бойові кораблі
- Тактичні навчання кораблів ВМС ЗС України.
- УКРАЇНА:ШЛЯХ ДО МОРЯ
