= U937 =

U937 may refer to:

- U937 (cell line), a human cell line
- a ship of the Ukrainian Navy
