= Ukrainian frigate Hetman Sahaidachny =

Krivak-class frigate

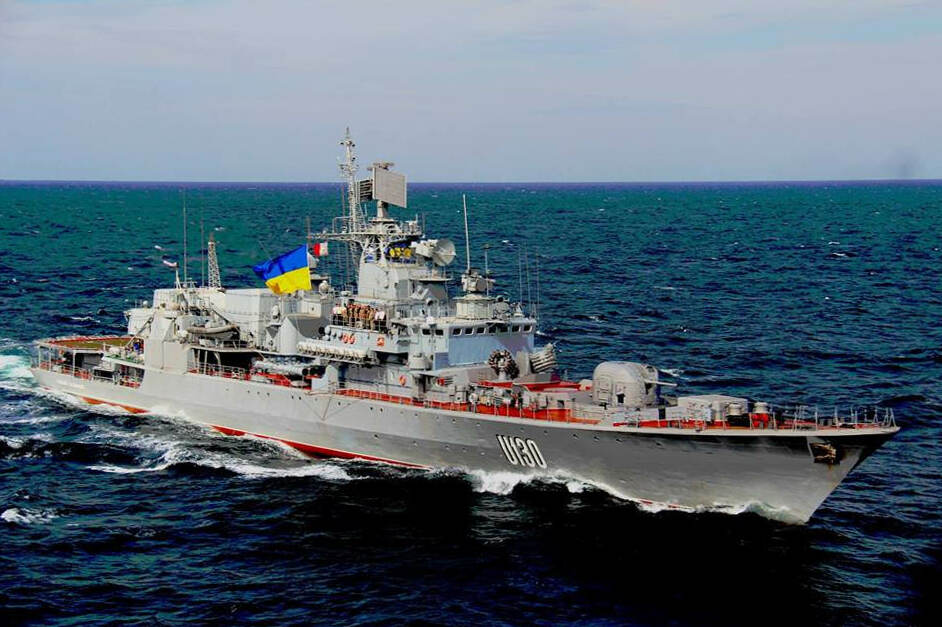
- Hetman Sahaidachny, 2016.

History

Soviet Union
- Name: Kirov
- Namesake: Sergei Kirov
- Builder: Zalyv Shipbuilding yard, Kerch
- Yard number: 208
- Laid down: 5 October 1990
- Fate: Transferred to Ukraine

Ukraine
- Name: Hetman Sahaidachny
- Namesake: Cossack Hetman Petro Konashevych-Sahaidachny
- Launched: 29 March 1992
- Commissioned: 2 April 1993
- Out of service: 3 March 2022
- Renamed: 1991
- Home port: Sevastopol: until 2014; Odesa: 2014-2022.
- Identification: U130; F130
- Honours and awards: Flagship of Ukraine
- Fate: Scuttled to prevent capture, 2022
- Badge

General characteristics
- Class & type: Nerey / Menzhinskiy-class frigate (Krivak III)
- Displacement: 3,100 long tons (3,150 t) standard; 3,510 long tons (3,566 t) full load
- Length: 123 m (404 ft)
- Beam: 14.2 m (46 ft 7 in)
- Draught: 4.7 m (15 ft 5 in)
- Installed power: 5 auxiliary diesel generator DGAS-500/1MSh
- Propulsion: COGAG M7N; 2 cruising turbine M62; 2 jet turbine M8K
- Speed: 32 knots (59 km/h; 37 mph)
- Range: 3,500 nmi (6,500 km; 4,000 mi) at 14 kn (26 km/h; 16 mph); 900 nmi (1,700 km; 1,000 mi) at 30 kn (56 km/h; 35 mph)
- Boats & landing craft carried: At least one rigid lifeboat.
- Crew: 193
- Sensors & processing systems: MR-760 Fregat/Top Plate 3-D air search; Platina-C suite with MGK-335MC Titan-2/Bull; Nose bow mounted MF MG-325 Vega/Mare Tale MF VDS
- Electronic warfare & decoys: Start-2/Bell Shroud intercept; Bell Squat A/B jammer; 4 x HMG PK-16 decoy
- Armament: 1 × single 100 mm (3.9 in) AK-100 gun; 1 × 2 4K33-Osa-M SAM-System; 2 × 30 mm (1.2 in) AK-630 CIWS; 2 × quad 533 mm (21 in) torpedo tubes; 2 × RBU-6000 anti-submarine rocket launchers
- Aircraft carried: 1 × Ka-27 helicopter (2 max)
- Aviation facilities: Hangar for two helicopters.

Hetman Sahaidachny (U130/F130) (Ukrainian: Гетьман Сагайдачний) was a frigate of the Ukrainian Navy that was originally built at the Kerch Shipyard as a Project 11351 patrol ship of the Nerey / Krivak III / Menzhinskiy class. Homeported at Odesa since March 2014, she was the flagship of the Ukrainian Navy, and a part of the 30th Surface Ships Division. Her major armament was a single 100 mm gun.

As Russian forces advanced toward Mykolaiv when the Russo-Ukrainian war escalated, Hetman Sahaidachny was scuttled by Ukraine on 4 March 2022, to prevent capture.

== Construction and career ==
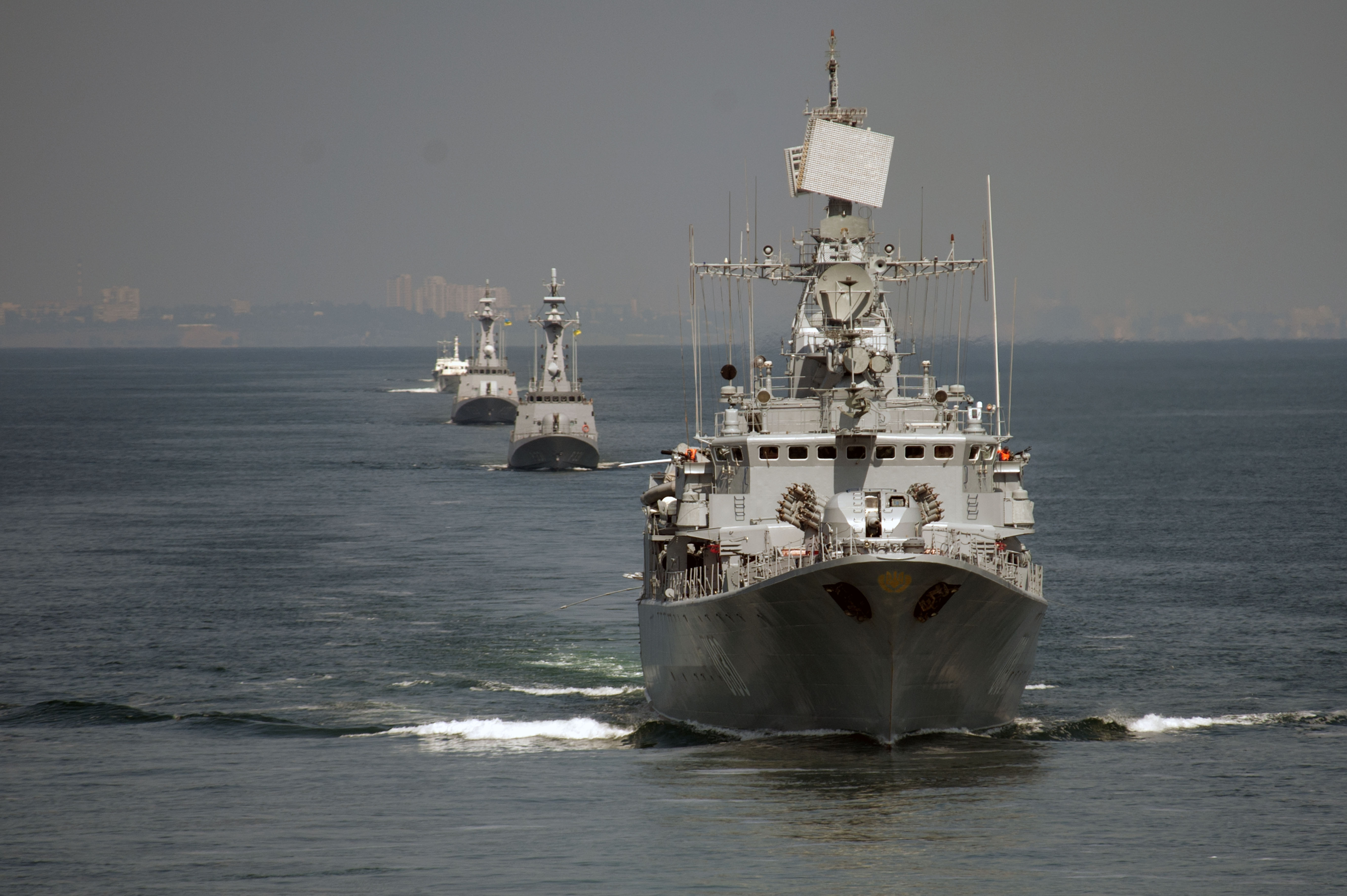
Hetman Sahaydachny with Turkish FAC

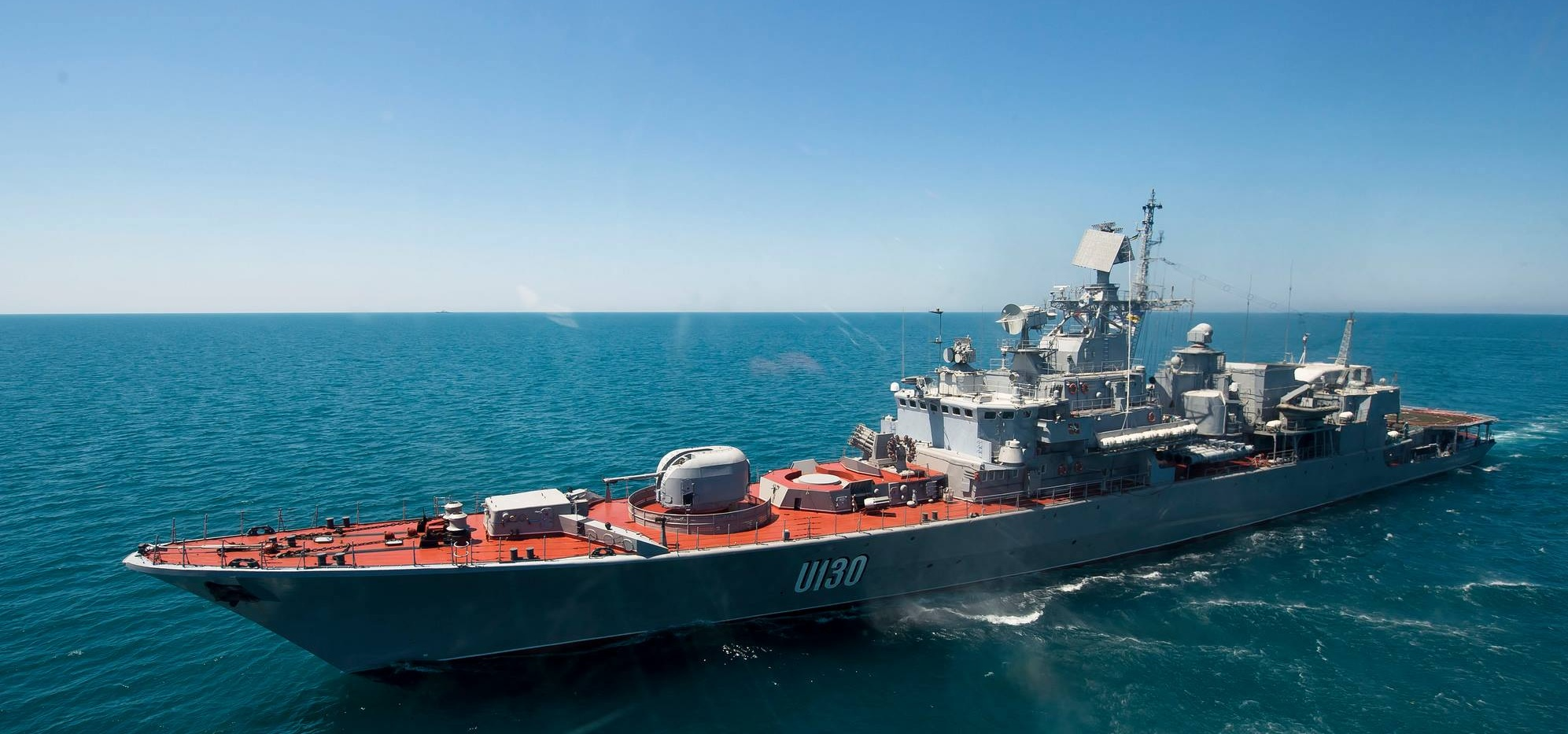
The frigate during Exercise Sea Breeze 2015

She was laid down on 5 October 1990 at the Zalyv Shipbuilding yard with yard number 208, the ship was intended to be used by the Soviet Border Troops as Kirov. However, after the dissolution of the Soviet Union in December 1991, the ship was acquired by the Ukrainian Navy as her shipyard was located in Kerch, Ukraine. The ship was launched on 29 March 1992. She was completed on 2 April 1993 as Hetman Sahaidachny, named after Petro Konashevych-Sahaidachny. She was given the identification number of U130. On 4 July 1993, Hetman Sahaidachny was the first ship to raise the flag of the Ukrainian Navy.

In 1994, Hetman Sahaidachny set sail for France to take part in the 50th-anniversary commemorations of the Allied invasion of Normandy. In fall 1995, Hetman Sahaidachny visited Abu Dhabi during the "Idex-95" exhibitions. The frigate was scheduled to visit Norfolk, Virginia in the United States with Kostiantyn Olshansky. Kostiantyn Olshansky visited, but Hetman Sahaidachny did not for unknown reasons.

The vessel has also visited ports in Algeria, Bulgaria, Egypt, Georgia, Gibraltar, Israel, Portugal, Russia and Turkey.

Between November 2006 and November 2007, she underwent major repairs in Mykolaiv at a cost of ₴15 million.

In 2008, Hetman Sahaidachny took part in "Operation Active Endeavour" in the Mediterranean Sea.

Hetman Sahaidachny joined the Naval Force of the European Union (EUNAVFOR) in early January 2014 for NATO's "Operation Ocean Shield" anti-piracy operations off the Horn of Africa. As she refueled in Greece, while Russian forces seized control of Crimea, Russian state media RT falsely reported on 1 March 2014 that the ship's crew had defected to Russia and raised the Russian flag. Shortly afterwards, the Wall Street Journal reported a Ukrainian Defense Ministry statement that the ship was still flying the Ukrainian flag in port in Crete. According to the Defense Ministry, the commander of the ship stated that the crew had never defected to the Russians. It arrived in Odesa under the Ukrainian flag on 5 March.

The Ukrainian naval command issued a contradictory report that on 14 March 2014, the ship encountered a Russian naval group attempting to enter or having entered Ukrainian territorial waters. As Hetman Sahaidachny approached the group, they withdrew. In September 2014, the frigate entered Odesa to undergo repairs. In December 2015, the frigate received a FURUNO FAR-2117/27 navigation and radar system worth ₴277,000 from the Come Back Alive Foundation. The radar replaced the older MR1000 system and was intended to improve target detection, vessel tracking and navigational safety. According to the frigate's commander, the new system could detect targets at ranges of up to 96 nautical miles (approximately 180 km) and track up to 100 targets. In May 2017, she suffered an engine failure shortly after undergoing repairs. In July 2018 she participated in the multinational Exercise Sea Breeze 2018.

On 2 April 2018, she celebrated the 25th anniversary of her commissioning. In January 2022, it was indicated that the ship would undergo a refit and upgrade.

== Scuttling ==
During the 2022 Russian invasion of Ukraine, the ship was scuttled in Mykolaiv. On 3 March 2022, a photo emerged showing Hetman Sahaidachny partially sunk and with a list to port. On 4 March, the Ukrainian Defence Minister confirmed that Hetman Sahaidachny had been scuttled to prevent her capture by the Russian forces. According to the satellite imagery, it possibly happened on 28 February.

== Bibliography ==
- Apalkov, Yuri Valentinovich (2005). Противолодочные корабли Часть 1. Противолодочные крейсера, большие противолодочные и сторожевые корабли [Anti-submarine ships Part 1. Anti-submarine cruisers, large anti-submarine ships and patrol ships] (in Russian). St Petersburg: Galeya. ISBN 978-5-81720-094-2.
- Saunders, Stephen, ed. (2009). Jane's Fighting Ships 2009-2010. Jane's Information Group. ISBN 9780710628886.
