= 31st Naval Supply Ships Division =

31st Supply Ships Division
- 31-й дивізіон суден забезпечення
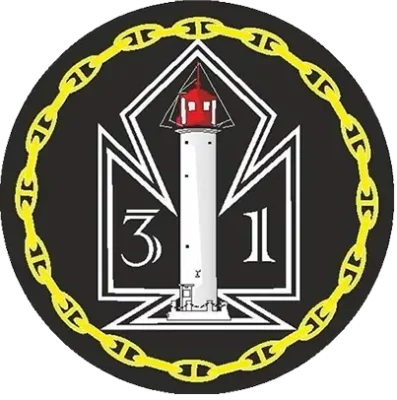
- Division Insignia
- Active: 2018 - present
- Country: Ukraine
- Branch: Ukrainian Navy
- Type: Division
- Role: Logistics
- Part of: Armed Forces of Ukraine
- Garrison/HQ: Western Naval Base
- Engagements: Russo-Ukrainian War: War in Donbass; Kerch Strait incident; 2022 Russian Invasion of Ukraine

Insignia
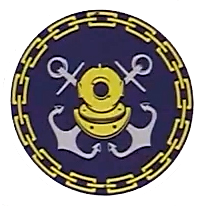
- Former Insignia

The 31st Supply Ships Division is a logistical division of the Ukrainian Navy concerned with providing logistical and technical support to other divisions of the Ukrainian Navy. It is based at the Western Naval Base and was established in 2018 by the splitting of the 8th Security and Support Division.

== History ==
In 2018, the 8th Security and Support Division was split into two units, one being the 8th Raid Protection Ships Division and the other being the 31st Supply Ships Division.

Three vessels of the division ( the Nova Kakhovka, the Smila, and the Chygyrin) became integrated for the training of 2nd and 5th year naval cadets and were scheduled to visit Turkey, Romania, and Bulgaria.

The division's tugboat Yany Kapu attempted to travel from the Black Sea port of Odesa in south-western Ukraine to the Azov Sea port of Mariupol in eastern Ukraine but was intercepted by Russian warships and was captured in the ensuing Kerch Strait incident. The captured vessel was returned to Ukraine on November 18, 2019, near Cape Tarkhankut and was towed to Ochakiv on November 20, 2019.

In April 2020, the division's vessel Shostka carried out exercises with the Ukrainian Marine Corps.

== Vessels ==
- Shostka (Command Ship)
- Yana Kapu (Tugboat)
- Chornomorsk (Troopship)
- Chigyrin (Training Ship)
- Smila (Training Ship)
- Nova Kakhovka (Training Ship)
- Korosten (Communications Ship)
- Boikiy (Communications Ship)

== Commanders ==
- Lisovoy Volodymyr Volodymyrovych (2018-)
