= Liana's Ransom =

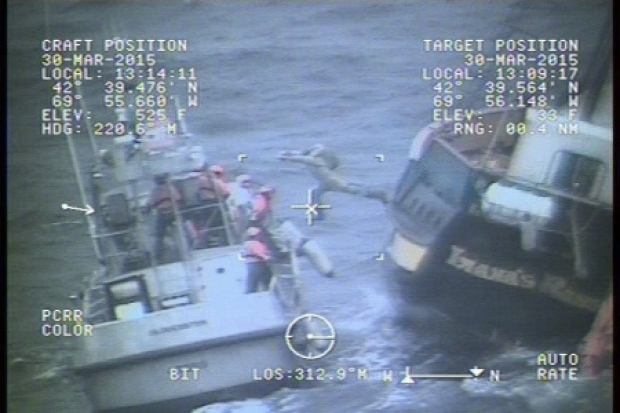
A crew member leaps off the Liana's Ransom during her 2015-03-31 rescue.

Liana's Ransom was a pirate-themed party vessel, operated from Nova Scotia.

The 26 metre topsail schooner was built in Houston, Texas. The vessel arrived in Nova Scotia in 2006. Transport Canada certified to carry up to 70 passengers. The crew don pirate costumes, including replica cutlasses and flintlock pistols, to amuse guests. A replica cannon was mounted on board, capable of giving black-powder salutes. Groups have chartered the vessel for both day excursions and voyages on the Great Lakes, around Nova Scotia, and in the Caribbean.

The vessel was dismasted, off Sable Island, and required assistance from the Canadian Coast Guard on December 17, 2014.

On March 31, 2015, bad weather off Massachusetts, including 3 meter waves and winds of 55 kilometers per hour, required the captain, Ryan Tilley, to radio the United States Coast Guard for assistance. The vessel was proceeding from Meteghan River, Nova Scotia to St. Maarten, Dutch West Indies. The engines had failed, and one of the sails was damaged. When a pair of Coast Guard motor lifeboats were unable to tow the vessel, the decision was made that the vessel's complement of nine should don cold-water immersion suits and be transferred to the Coast Guard rescue vessels. Captain Tilley locked all the steel-hulled vessel's ports and water-tight doors, prior to his departure. A beacon was left aboard the vessel so it could be found and towed into port. The Motor lifeboats were from Gloucester, Massachusetts. The Island class cutter USCGC Ocracoke Island, and air elements from Air Station Cape Cod also rendered assistance. One crew member who sustained a concussion was evacuated by helicopter to Massachusetts General Hospital.
