= Cushing Island =

Privately owned island in Casco Bay, Maine

Coordinates: 43°38′28″N 70°12′28″W

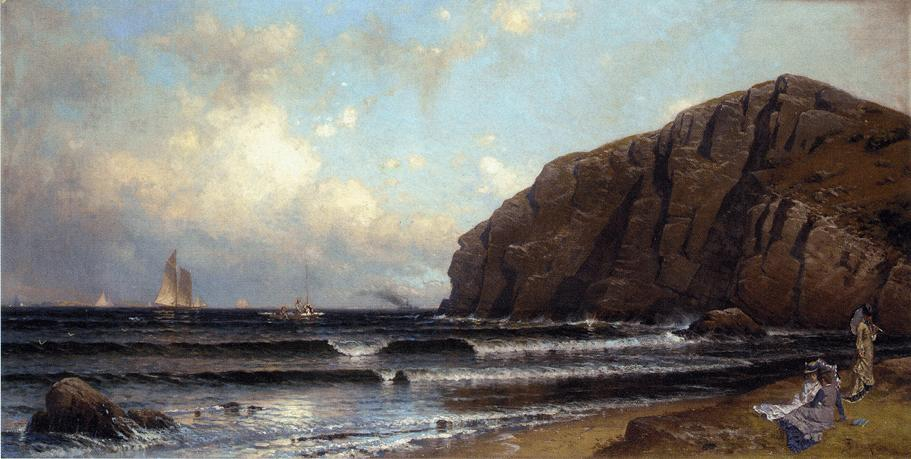
Cushing Island, Portland Harbor, Alfred Thompson Bricher, ca. 1870

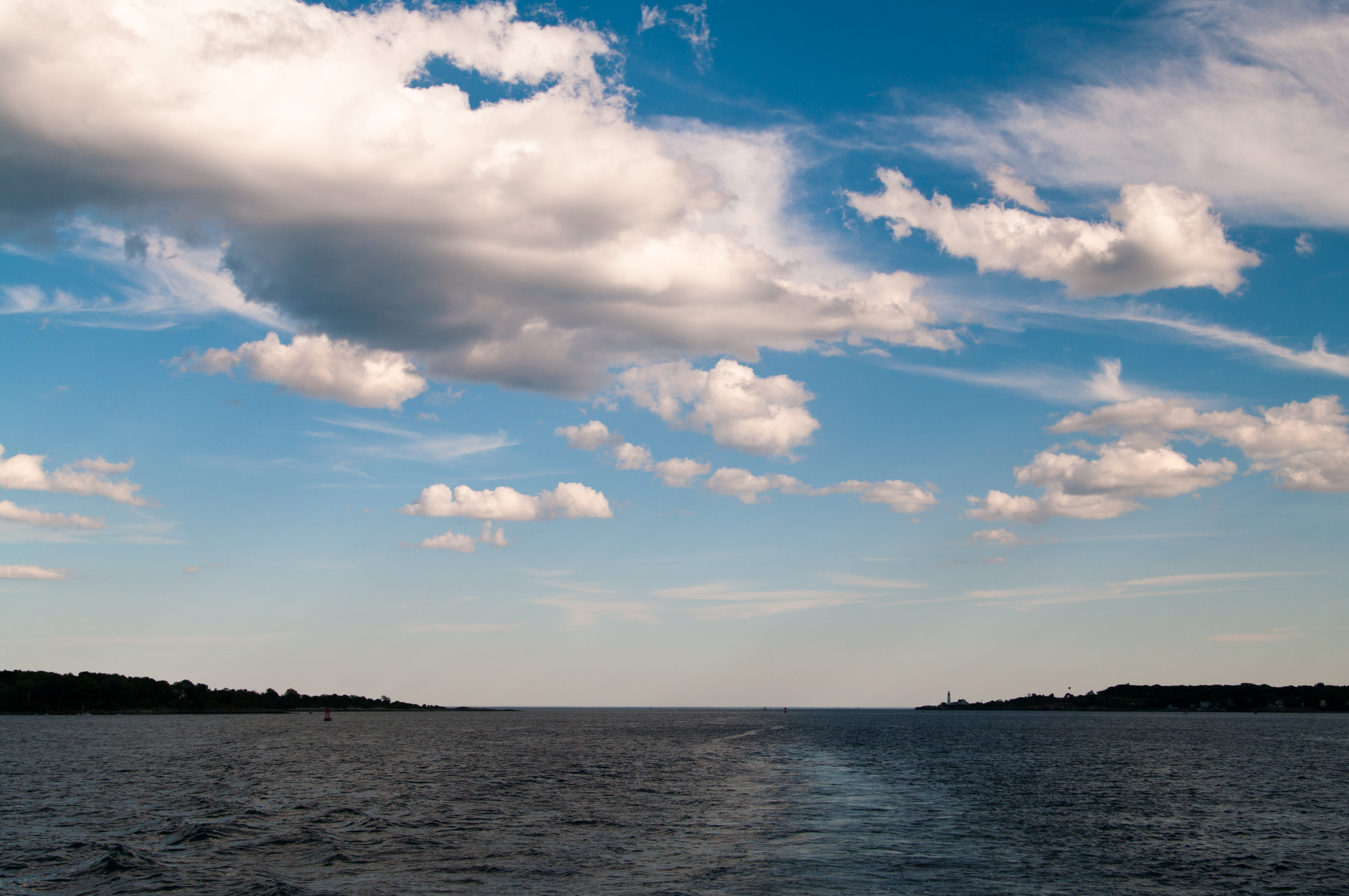
Cushing Island opposite the Portland Head Lighthouse.

Cushing Island, or Cushing's Island, is a privately owned island in Casco Bay in the U.S. state of Maine. Part of the city of Portland, roughly 45 families live there seasonally.

== History ==
In 1623-24 English explorer Christopher Levett built a blockhouse on the island, part of 6,000 acres (24 km^{2}) granted him by the English King. Levett left behind a group of settlers to carry on after he returned to England. But the naval captain and adventurer never returned, and the fate of the men is unknown. After Levett's occupation the island was known as Andrews Island. Levett's early settlement earned him the sobriquet "the pioneer colonist in Casco Bay" from eminent Maine historian James Phinney Baxter.

After a host of owners, in September 1734, Nathaniel Jones conveyed the island to Joshua Bangs. The island was then known as 'Bangs Island'. The name 'Bangs Island' will be found on maps from the period. In the late 1750s Ezekiel Cushing obtained the island from Bangs. In 1760, Bangs regained the island. The island was later conveyed to Jedediah Preble, Joshua Bangs' son-in-law after Bangs' death. Simeon Skillings, a relation of Preble's later lived on the island and purchased small parts of the land. Lemuel Cushing, a fourth cousin of Ezekiel Cushing purchased most of the island in 1859. Cushing then consolidated the holdings of the Preble's and the Skilling's, becoming the sole owner of the island. Born in Quebec, Canada, to Massachusetts emigrants, Lemuel Cushing planned to turn the island into a summer resort and built the Ottawa House hotel. Lemuel's son Francis Cushing formed the Cushing's Island Company in 1883 and hired Frederick Law Olmsted the same year to develop the island as a planned 'summer colony'. Olmsted designed the landscape of the island, along with architect John Calvin Stevens.

The first Ottawa House was destroyed by fire and rebuilt in 1888. The second Ottawa House burned down in 1917 and was not rebuilt.

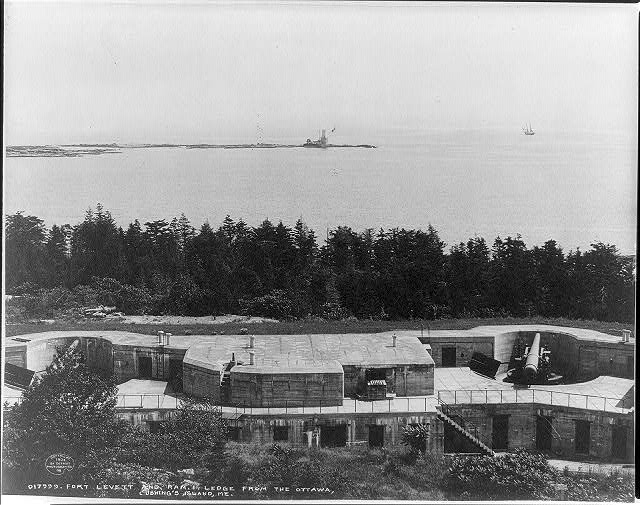
View of Fort Levett and Ram's Island ledge, Cushing Island, Maine, ca. 1904

The United States Army began acquiring land on the island in the 1890s to build Fort Levett, named for explorer Christopher Levett, the English explorer and first settler of what is now Portland, which eventually grew to 200 acres (0.8 km^{2}). (The island was initially known as Levett's Island, after the first English settler of Maine. Levett has been described by the eminent Maine historian James Phinney Baxter as "the first owner of the soil of Portland.") It was last used during World War II for coastal defense. That land was purchased by island residents in 1970. The island is now privately owned.

The island has a US Coast Guard Cutter that bears its name, USCGC Cushing (WPB-1321), previously stationed in Mobile, AL, and homeported in Atlantic Beach, North Carolina. It decommissioned on March 8, 2017, and was sold to the Ukrainian Navy in 2018, being renamed the Sloviansk. The Sloviansk was sunk by the Russian Air Force at the start of the War in Ukraine on March 3, 2022.

== Notable places ==
The island is inhabited seasonally. A caretaker lives on the island year round. Some of the private homes can be rented. Little Beach faces Portland Harbor. Big Beach is located on the southern end of the island. Whitehead is a sheer rock cliff on the northern end of the island across from Peaks Island.

Ferry service is provided by the St Croix, which departs from Long Wharf in Portland and lands at the summer dock, also known as Civilian Dock. Access to the island is for private/owners use only. Water taxi service is available from Portland. Many of the islanders also own boats, with berthing spaces at Civilian and Government docks.

Much of the island is a nature preserve owned by the Cushings Island Conservation and protected from development. This area is largely forested with well-maintained walking trails and abandoned military fortifications from when it was the US Army’s Fort Levitt.

== See also ==
- List of islands of Maine
