= 28th Naval Auxiliary Division =

28th Naval Auxiliary Division (2018-) 28th Separate Search and Rescue Division (2014-2018)
- 28-й дивізіон допоміжних суден
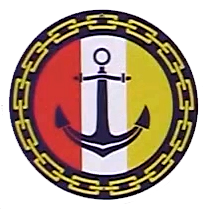
- Division Insignia
- Active: 2014 - present
- Country: Ukraine
- Branch: Ukrainian Navy
- Type: Division
- Role: Auxiliary operations
- Part of: Ukrainian Navy
- Garrison/HQ: Western Naval Base
- Engagements: Russo-Ukrainian War: Annexation of Crimea by the Russian Federation; War in Donbas; 2022 Russian invasion of Ukraine

The 28th Naval Auxiliary Division is an Auxiliary division of the Ukrainian Navy, based at Western Naval Base. It was originally established in 2014 as the 28th Separate Search and Rescue Division and was formerly stationed at Sevastopol. It is mainly concerned with providing support to combatant ships of the Ukrainian Navy.

== History ==
in the spring of 2014, it was the established as the 28th Separate Division of Emergency Rescue Vessels at the Sevastopol Naval Base before its takeover by Russia.

On March 21, 2014, during the takeover by Russia the regiment's ships Borscht, Romny, Tokmak, Sokal, Shostka, Zolotonosha and Izyaslav and the Ukrainian flags were replaced by the tricolor of the Russian Federation and the St. Andrew's flag of Black Sea Fleet. The vessels were returned to Ukraine in the coming months. (Note: Shostka and Zolotonosha were returned to Ukraine on April 16, Borscht, Romny and Tokmak on April 30, Sokal on May 24 and Izyaslav on June 3.)

On June 5, 2020, the ship Oleksandr Okhrimenko participated in the test of Neptune land-based cruise missile complex in a designated area of the Black Sea performing the tasks of the closure of the area, the establishment of the target area, search and rescue and medical support during the sea trials.

In 2022, during the Russo-Ukrainian war, the division's ship Balta equipped with high caliber weapons was involved in the Defense of Odessa from Russian naval assaults. Moreover, during a naval engagement, the division's ship Pochayiv managed to force the newest Russian frigate Admiral Makarov to retreat. Admiral Makarov opened fire on Pochayiv using its 100-mm but missed the targets due to its careful maneuvering. Admiral Makarov was much larger and better equipped but the crew of Pochayiv lured it into the range of Ukrainian coastal artillery forcing it to retreat to Sevastopol.

== Vessels ==
- Izyaslav (Tugboat)
- Borscht (Fireboat) (Note: Decommissioned)
- Romny (Diving support vessel)
- Tokmak (Diving support vessel) (Note: Decommissioned)
- Sokal (Hospital ship)
- Shostka (Anchor handling tug supply vessel)
- Zolotonosha (Depot ship) (Note: Decommissioned)
- Dubno (Tugboat)
- Kremenets (Tugboat)
- Balta (Minesweeper)
- Pochayiv (Diving support vessel)
- Oleksandr Okhrimenko (Search and Rescue ship)
- RVK-258 (Diving support vessel)

== Commanders ==
- Afanasenko Evgeny Mykolayovych (2014)
- Lezhniuk Vitaliy Valeriyovych (2016 — 2017)
