= Ukrainian salvage ship Oleksandr Okhrimenko =

Ukrainian salvage ship

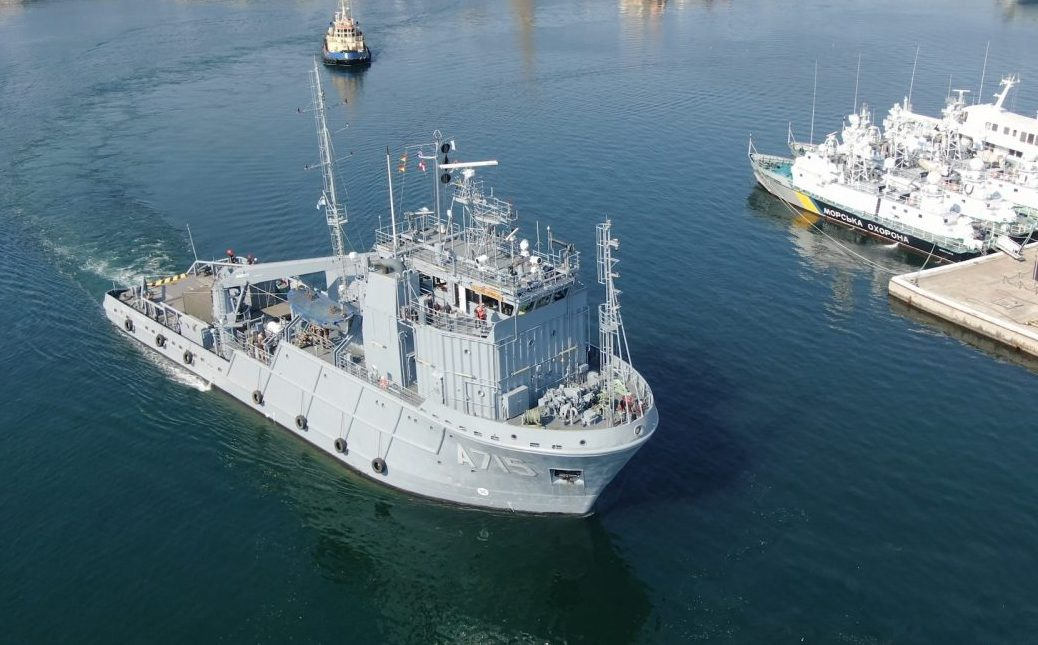
- The search and rescue ship Oleksandr Okhrimenko

Soviet Union
- Name: Svetlomor-4
- Owner: Black Sea Shipping Company
- Port of registry: Odesa
- Builder: Keppel Fels, Singapore
- Launched: 1987

Ukraine
- Name: Оleksandr Okhrimenko
- Owner: Maritime Search and Rescue Service
- Port of registry: Odesa
- Acquired: 1992
- Out of service: 2019
- Identification: IMO number: 8606496; MMSI number: 272888000; Callsign: USJX

Ukraine
- Name: Oleksandr Okhrimenko
- In service: 13 November 2019

General characteristics
- Type: Salvage ship
- Displacement: 1,258 tons (empty) 2,258 tons (loaded)
- Length: 61 m (200 ft 2 in)
- Beam: 14 m (45 ft 11 in)
- Draft: 3.7 m (12 ft 2 in) (empty), 4.5 m (14 ft 9 in) (loaded)
- Propulsion: Wartsila 8R22HFD (2 × 1,300 kW (1,700 hp)) diesels; 3 Volvo Penta power supply units (190 kW (250 hp) each)
- Speed: 12 knots (22 km/h; 14 mph) max
- Range: 5,800 mi (9,300 km)
- Complement: 26 men (by project), maximum 37 men (number of racks in compartments)

Oleksandr Okhrimenko is a search and rescue ship of the Naval Forces of Armed Forces of Ukraine belonging to 28th Naval Auxiliary Division.

== History ==
Oleksandr Okhrimenko, a Project 2262 search and rescue ship, was built by Keppel Fels shipyard for the USSR. The ship was launched in 1987 as Svetlomor-4.

In late 1992, the ship was assigned to the Black Sea Shipping Company's expeditionary search and rescue group. In 2012 the ship was renamed Оleksandr Okhrimenko and reassigned to the state (treasury) company Maritime Emergency and Rescue Service (МАРС). It was later reassigned again to the Seaports Administration of Ukraine.

In 2016, the Seaports Administration ran a tender to find a contractor to refit the ship. The winner was Millenium Maritime, LLC, pledging to repair the vessel at a cost of ₴49 million. The Seaports Administration transferred funds with the exception of the few millions that were acknowledged as missing. Millenium Maritime, LLC sued the Seaports Administration for ₴3 million, winning the case. During the period, the ship was impounded.

In December 2018, the Solomyanskyi court in Kyiv lifted the impoundment to allow her transfer to the Ukrainian Navy. The ship was formally transferred to the Ukrainian Navy from the Ministry of Infrastructure on August 29, 2019.

The ship appeared on the horizon at 15.30 and at 17:20 was moored at Pivdenna Naval Base, Praktychna harbor.

On November 13 2019, solemn events on the occasion of the transfer of the search and rescue vessel to the Ukrainian Navy took place in Odesa.
