= Ocean Freedom =

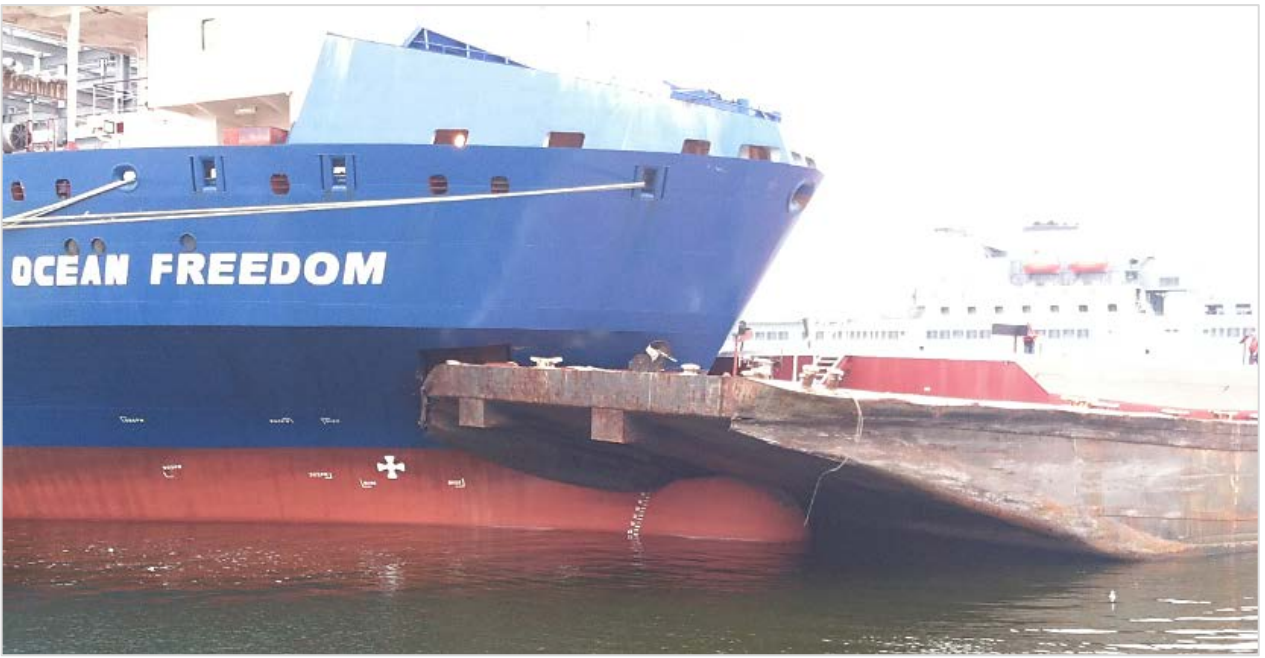
The cargo vessel Ocean Freedom collided with the barge Kirby 28044 on October 29, 2015.

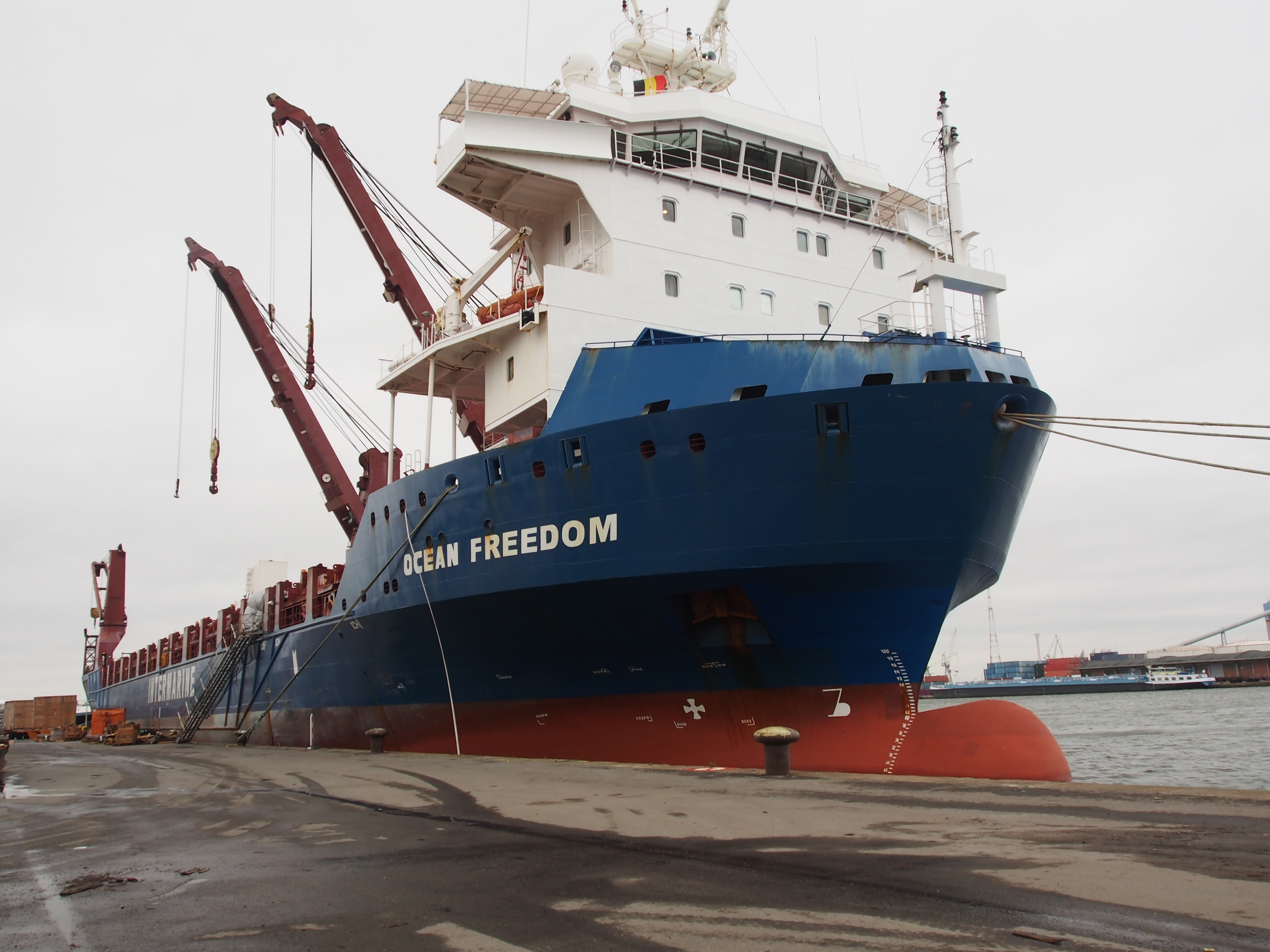
Ocean Freedom in the Port of Antwerp.

The Ocean Freedom is a multi-purpose dry cargo ship, commissioned in 2010.

She was damaged in a collision with a barge in the Port of Corpus Christi, Texas, on October 29, 2015. Damage totalled $750,000.

She carried two former United States Coast Guard cutters to Odesa, to serve in the Ukrainian Navy, in October 2019.
