= Kurortne, Chuhuiv Raion, Kharkiv Oblast =

Village in Kharkiv Oblast, Ukraine

Kurortne Курортне
- Village
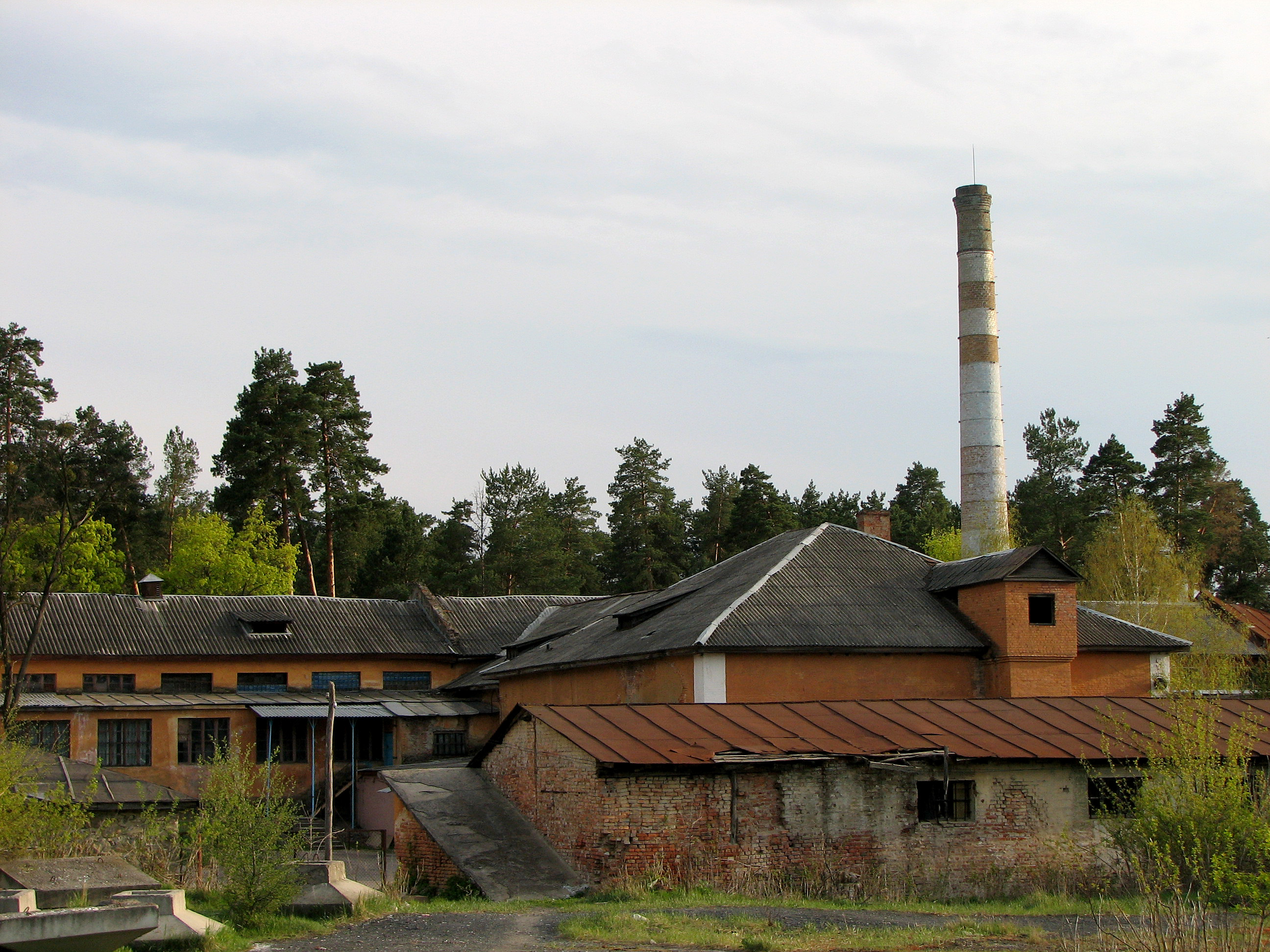
- Interactive map of Kurortne
- Location of Kurortne Kurortne (Ukraine)
- Coordinates: 49°40′33″N 36°27′10″E
- Country: Ukraine
- Oblast: Kharkiv Oblast
- Raion: Chuhuiv Raion
- Hromada: Slobozhanske urban hromada
- Elevation: 109 m (358 ft)

Population (2001)
  - Total: 294
- Postal code: 63434
- Area code: +380 5747
- Climate: Cfa

Kurortne (Ukrainian: Курортне) is a village in Chuhuiv Raion, Kharkiv Oblast (province) of Ukraine.

Until 18 July 2020, Kurortne was located in Zmiiv Raion. The raion was abolished on that day as part of the administrative reform of Ukraine, which reduced the number of raions of Kharkiv Oblast to seven.
