= Western Naval Base (Ukraine) =

Main Ukrainian naval base in Odesa

- Odesa, Ukraine.

Site information
- Type: Naval base
- Owner: Ukraine
- Controlled by: Ukrainian Navy

Western Naval Base is the current main naval base of the Armed Forces of Ukraine located in Odesa along the northwest coast of the Black Sea. It is one of two active naval bases of the Ukrainian Navy along with the Azov Naval Base in Berdyansk. Until 2014, Ukraine also operated the Southern Naval Base and Main Naval Base in Sevastopol.

The Western Naval Base was formerly a base of the Soviet Navy.

== Units ==
- 1st Guard and Patrol Division, A2951
- 22nd Separate Radio and Engineering company, A2408
- 28th Naval Auxiliary Division, A4414
- 30th Separate Surface Ship Division, A0937
- 31st Supply Ships Division

== Commanders ==
- Ukrainian Dmytro Stepanovych (1994—2002)
- Khachaturov Karen Yervandovych (2003—2012)
- Ihor Petrovych Zaitsev (2012—2013)
- Kinzersky Yevhen Eduardovych (2013—2015)
- Doskato Oleksii Olehovych (2015—2018)
