= USCGC Washington =

Island-class patrol boat of the US Coast Guard

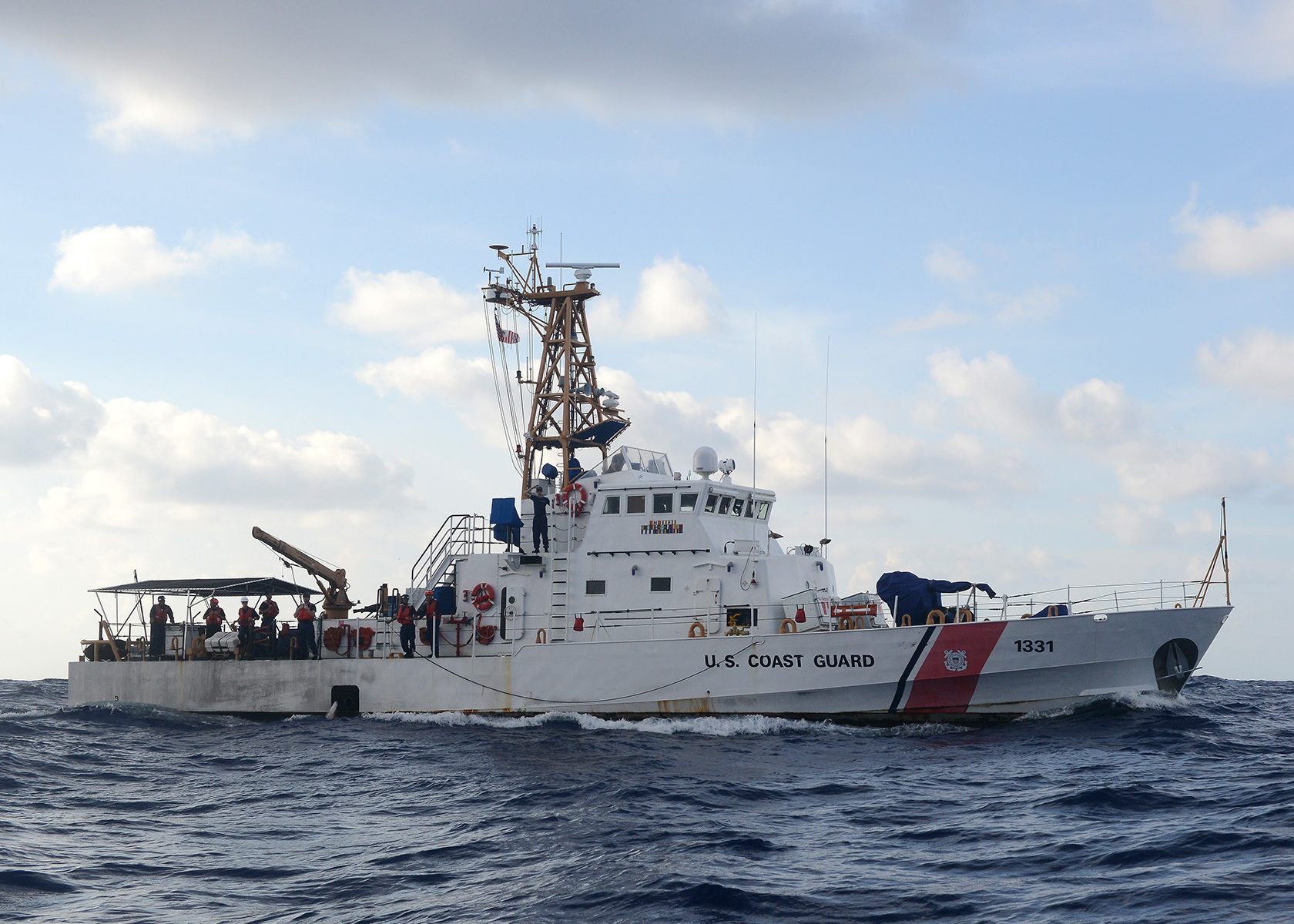
- USCGC Washington off Palau in 2019

History

United States
- Name: USCGC Washington
- Namesake: Washington Island, Washington, WI
- Builder: Bolinger Shipyard, Lockport, Louisiana
- Cost: $7 million
- Launched: 10 November 1989
- Commissioned: 15 June 1990
- Decommissioned: 18 December 2019
- Home port: Apra Harbor, Guam
- Identification: MMSI number: 367915000; Callsign: NVWJ; Hull number: WPB-1331
- Motto: Our Cause is Noble
- Status: Transferred to Ukraine, 2021
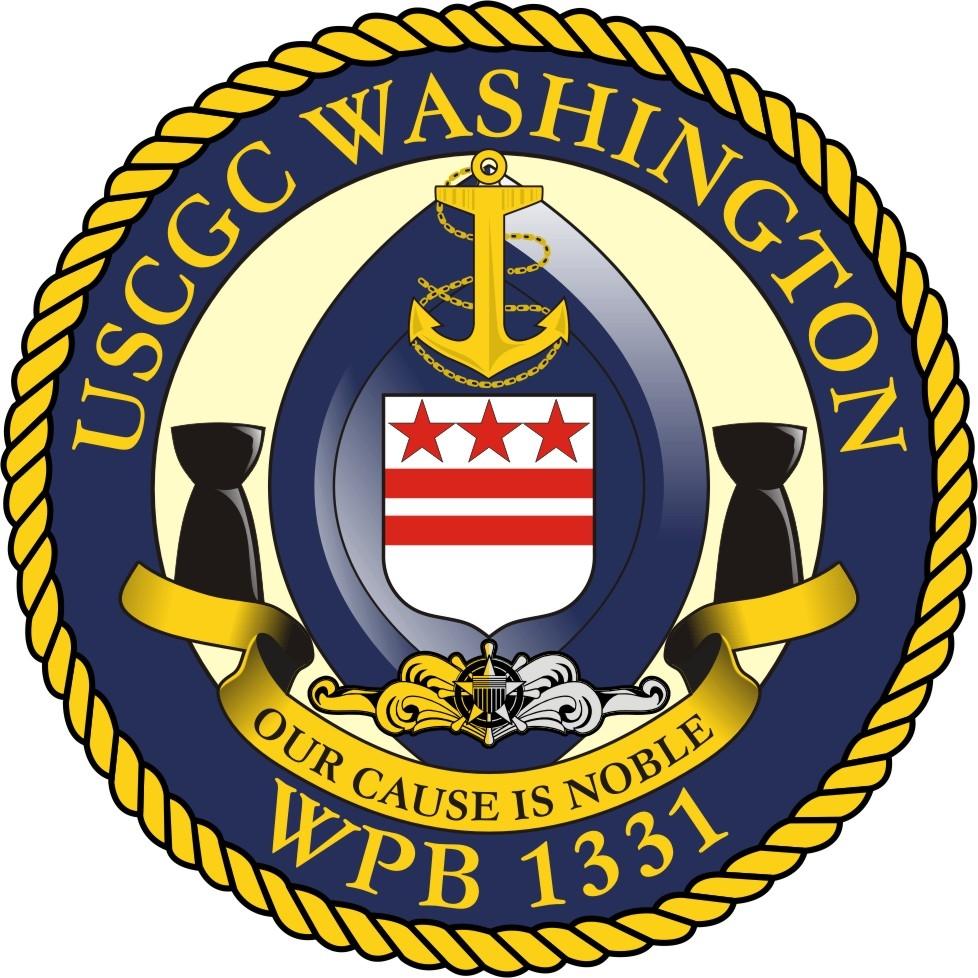
- Badge

Ukraine
- Name: Fastiv
- Namesake: Fastiv
- Acquired: 23 November 2021
- Commissioned: 29 November 2021
- In service: 6 December 2021
- Identification: Pennant number: P193
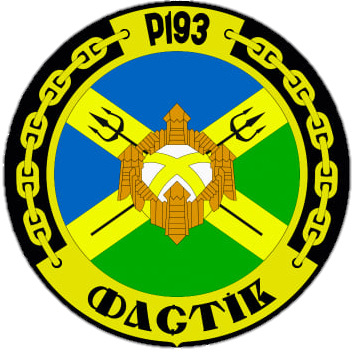
- Badge

General characteristics
- Class & type: Island-class cutter
- Displacement: 168 tons
- Length: 110 ft (33.5 m)
- Beam: 21 ft (6.4 m)
- Speed: 28 knots (52 km/h; 32 mph)
- Range: 2,000 nmi (3,704 km; 2,302 mi)
- Complement: 18

P193 Fastiv, formerly USCGC Washington (WPB-1331), is an Island-class cutter, formerly belonging to the United States Coast Guard. Washington was constructed at Bollinger Machine Shop and Shipyard in Lockport, Louisiana and commissioned on 15 June 1990. She was transferred to Odessa, Ukraine in 2021 and is currently in service of the Ukrainian Navy.

Formerly operating in the Coast Guard 14th District, the cutter reported to Sector Guam. Washington supported multi-mission operations throughout Sector Guam's vast area of responsibility, which includes the U.S. Exclusive Economic Zones surrounding Guam and the Commonwealth of the Northern Mariana Islands and an international SAR area that includes the Republic of Palau and the Federated States of Micronesia, conducting search & rescue response missions, and ports, waterways & coastal security operations.

Washington was decommissioned at Naval Base Guam on 18 December 2019.

It was then delivered to Odessa, Ukraine on November 23, 2021 together with the USCGC Ocracoke on board the cargo ship Ocean Grand. It was then enrolled into the service of the Ukrainian Navy on November 29, 2021 as a part of the 30th Surface Ships Division.

== Design ==
The Island-class patrol boats were constructed in Bollinger Shipyards, Lockport, Louisiana. Washington has an overall length of 110 feet (33.5 m). she has a beam of 21 feet (6.4 m) and a draft of 7 feet (2.1 m) at the time of construction. The patrol boat has a displacement of 154 tonnes (152 long tons; 170 short tons) at full load and 137 tonnes (135 long tons; 151 short tons) at half load. It is powered two Paxman Valenta 16 CM diesel engines or two Caterpillar 3516 diesel engines. It has two 99 kilowatts (135 PS; 133 shp) 3304T diesel generators made by Caterpillar; these can serve as motor–generators. Its hull is constructed from highly strong steel, and the superstructure and major deck are constructed from aluminum.

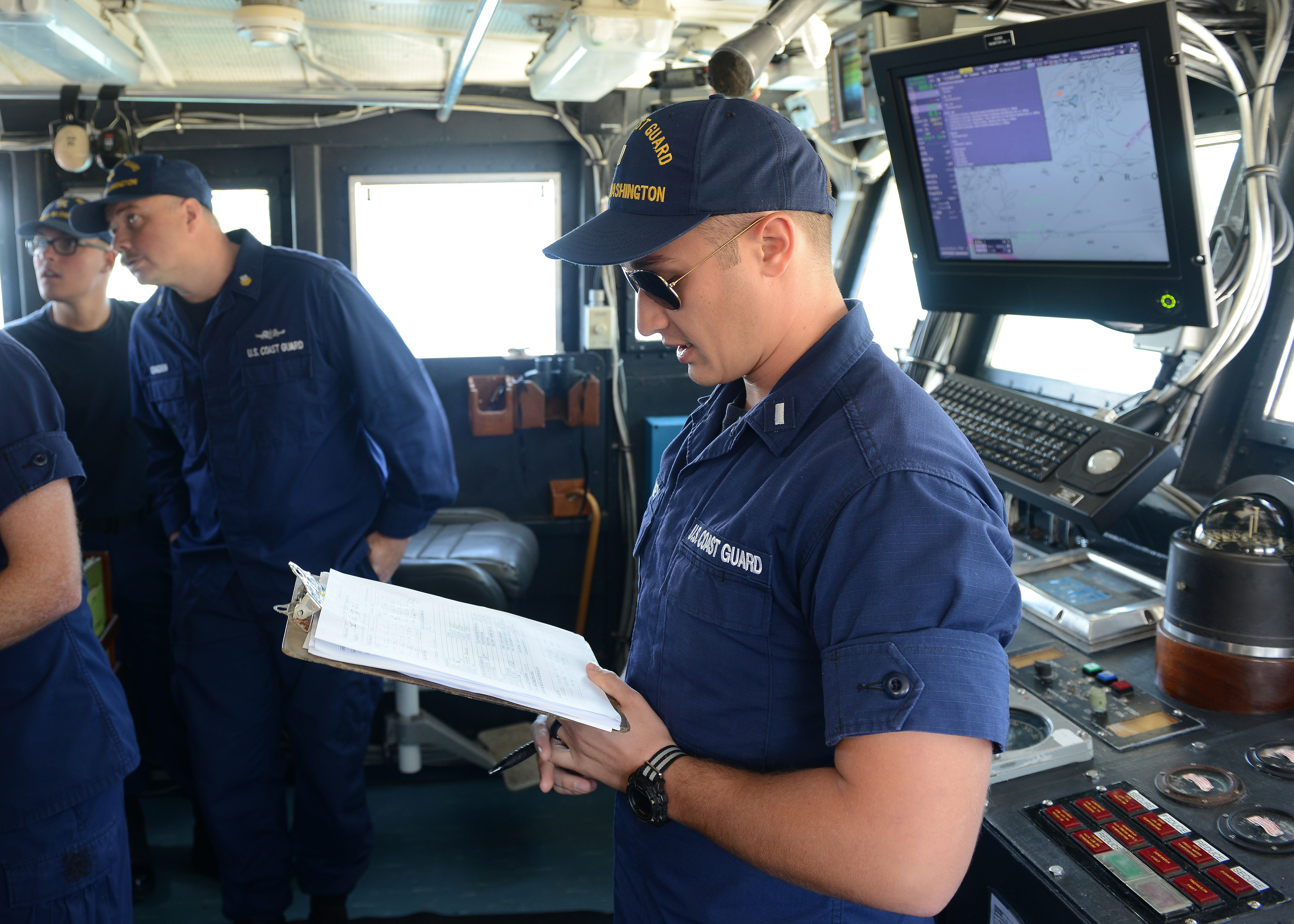
Bridge of the Washington off Palau in October 2019.

The Island-class patrol boats have maximum sustained speeds of 29.5 knots (54.6 km/h; 33.9 mph). It is fitted with one 25 mm (0.98 in) machine gun and two 7.62 mm (0.30 in) M60 light machine guns; it may also be fitted with two Browning .50 caliber machine guns. It is fitted with satellite navigation systems, collision avoidance systems, surface radar, and a Loran C system. It has a range of 3,330 miles (2,890 nmi; 5,360 km) and an endurance of five days. Its complement is sixteen (two officers and fourteen crew members). Island-class patrol boats are based on Vosper Thornycroft 33 m (108 ft) patrol boats and have similar dimensions.

== Operational career ==
In October 2019, the Washington participated in a joint fisheries patrol, off Palau, in cooperation with the Pacific Islands Forum Fisheries Agency.
