= Kurortne, Bilohirsk Raion, Crimea =

Kurortne Курортне
- Village
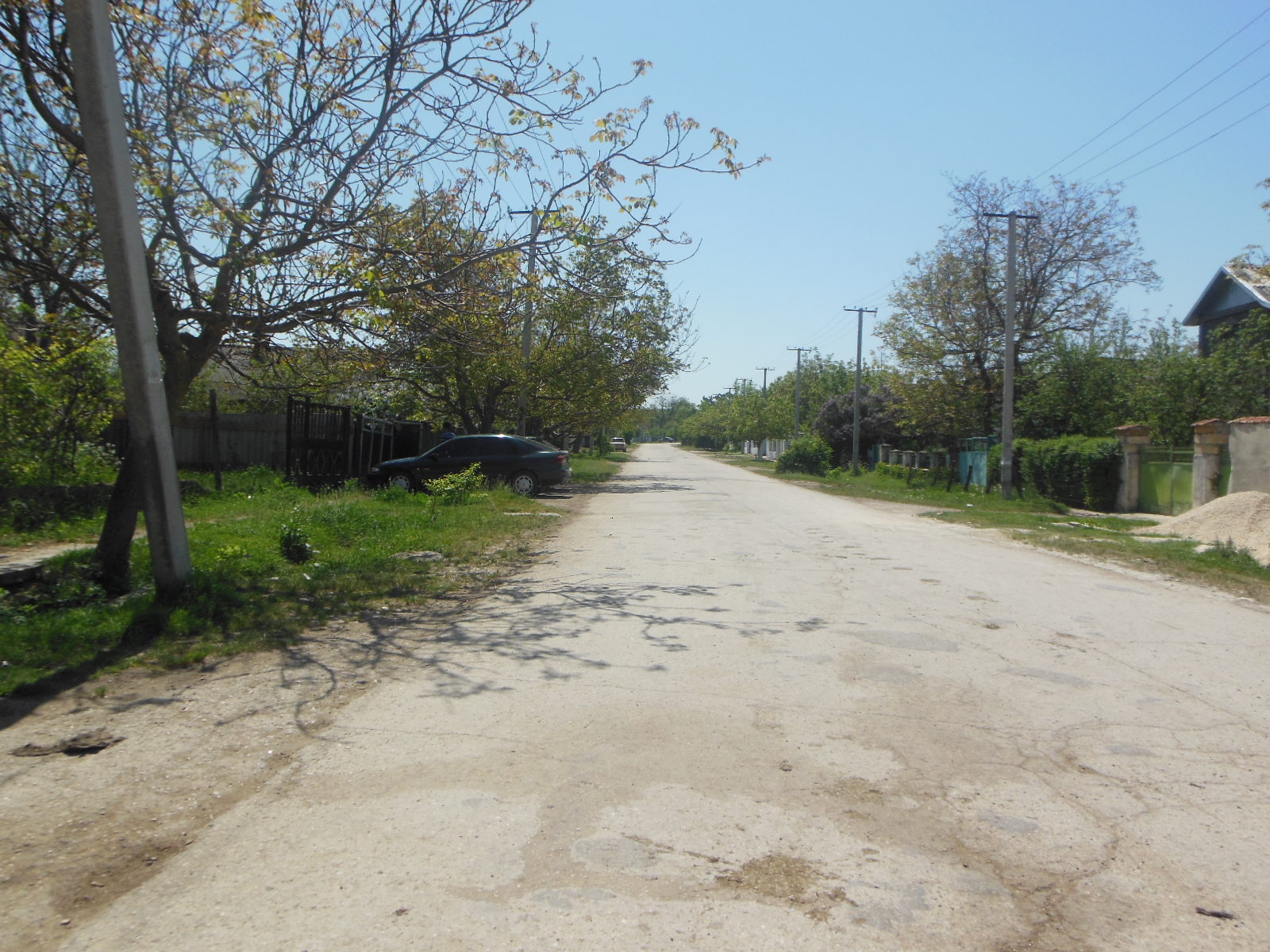

- Location of Kurortne in Crimea
- Coordinates: 44°59′46″N 34°21′47″E
- Country: Disputed; Russia, Ukraine
- Republic: Crimea
- Raion: Bilohirsk
- Elevation: 433 m (1,421 ft)

Population (2014)
  - Total: 431
- Time zone: UTC+4 (MSK)
- Postal code: 97637
- Area code: +380 6559

Kurortne (Ukrainian: Курортне; Russian: Курортное; Crimean Tatar: Han Toquz) is a village in the Bilohirsk Raion of Crimea. Population: 431 (2014 Census).
