= USCGC Ocracoke =

Island-class patrol boat of the US Coast Guard

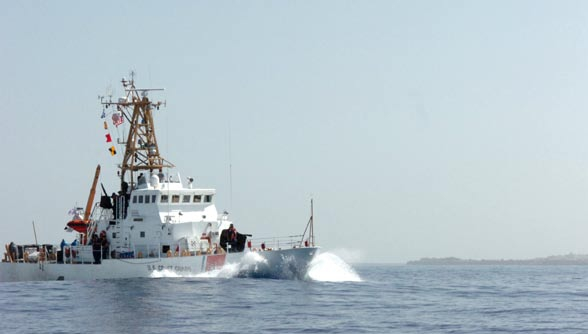
- USCGC Ocracoke, leaving Naval Base Guantanamo Bay, May 12, 2008.

History

United States
- Name: USCGC Ocracoke
- Namesake: Ocracoke Island
- Builder: Bollinger Shipyards, Lockport, Louisiana
- Commissioned: 1986
- Decommissioned: 22 November 2019
- Identification: MMSI number: 367929000; Callsign: NGBL
- Status: Transferred to Ukraine, 2021

Ukraine
- Name: Sumy
- Namesake: Sumy
- Acquired: 23 November 2021
- Commissioned: 29 November 2021
- In service: 6 December 2021
- Identification: Pennant number: P192
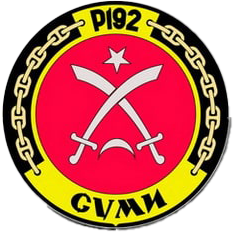
- Badge

General characteristics
- Class & type: Island class patrol boat
- Displacement: 168 tons
- Length: 110 feet
- Beam: 21 feet
- Propulsion: 2 diesel engines
- Speed: 28 knots
- Complement: 2 officers, 15 enlisted
- Armament: 25 mm Mk 38 machine gun, 2 .50 cal M2 machine guns

P192S Sumy , formerly USCGC Ocracoke (WPB-1307), is an Island Class Cutter formerly belonging to the United States Coast Guard. She was homeported in Maine, where she patrolled international & territorial waters as a humanitarian, law enforcement, and Homeland Security asset. Her primary missions were search and rescue, counter-smuggling activities, and homeland security. She was transferred to Odesa, Ukraine in 2021 and is currently in service of the Ukrainian Navy.

Upon commissioning in 1986 and until 1991, she was assigned to Coast Guard Patrol Boat Squadron Two (CG SLATER TWO) in Roosevelt Roads, Puerto Rico. During this period, she conducted law enforcement, search & rescue, and expeditionary naval operations. When USS Slater was decommissioned on July 1, 1991 she was assigned to Commander, Greater Antilles Section.

As of 2014, she was working out of Portland, Maine. On March 31, 2015, together with other USCG elements, she assisted the distressed Canadian sailing ship Liana's Ransom when she lost engine power during a storm off Gloucester, Massachusetts. On November 22, 2019, Ocracoke was decommissioned at a ceremony held in South Portland, ME.

She was delivered to Odesa on November 23, 2021 together with the ship USCGC Washington on board the cargo ship Ocean Grand and was enrolled in the service of the Ukrainian Navy on November 29, 2021. as a part of the 30th Surface Ships Division.

== Design ==
The Island-class patrol boats were constructed in Bollinger Shipyards, Lockport, Louisiana. Ocracoke has an overall length of 110 feet (34 m). It had a beam of 21 feet (6.4 m) and a draft of 7 feet (2.1 m) at the time of construction. The patrol boat has a displacement of 154 tonnes (152 long tons; 170 short tons) at full load and 137 tonnes (135 long tons; 151 short tons) at half load. It is powered two Paxman Valenta 16 CM diesel engines or two Caterpillar 3516 diesel engines. It has two 99 kilowatts (135 PS; 133 shp) 3304T diesel generators made by Caterpillar; these can serve as motor–generators. Its hull is constructed from highly strong steel, and the superstructure and major deck are constructed from aluminium.

The Island-class patrol boats have maximum sustained speeds of 29.5 knots (54.6 km/h; 33.9 mph). It is fitted with one 25 millimetres (0.98 in) machine gun and two 7.62 millimetres (0.300 in) M60 light machine guns; it may also be fitted with two Browning .50 Caliber Machine Guns. It is fitted with satellite navigation systems, collision avoidance systems, surface radar, and a Loran C system. It has a range of 3,330 miles (2,890 nmi; 5,360 km) and an endurance of five days. Its complement is sixteen (two officers & fourteen crew members). Island-class patrol boats are based on Vosper Thornycroft 33 metres (108 ft) patrol boats and have similar dimensions.
