= Kurortne, Lenine Raion, Crimea =

Kurortne Курортне
- Village
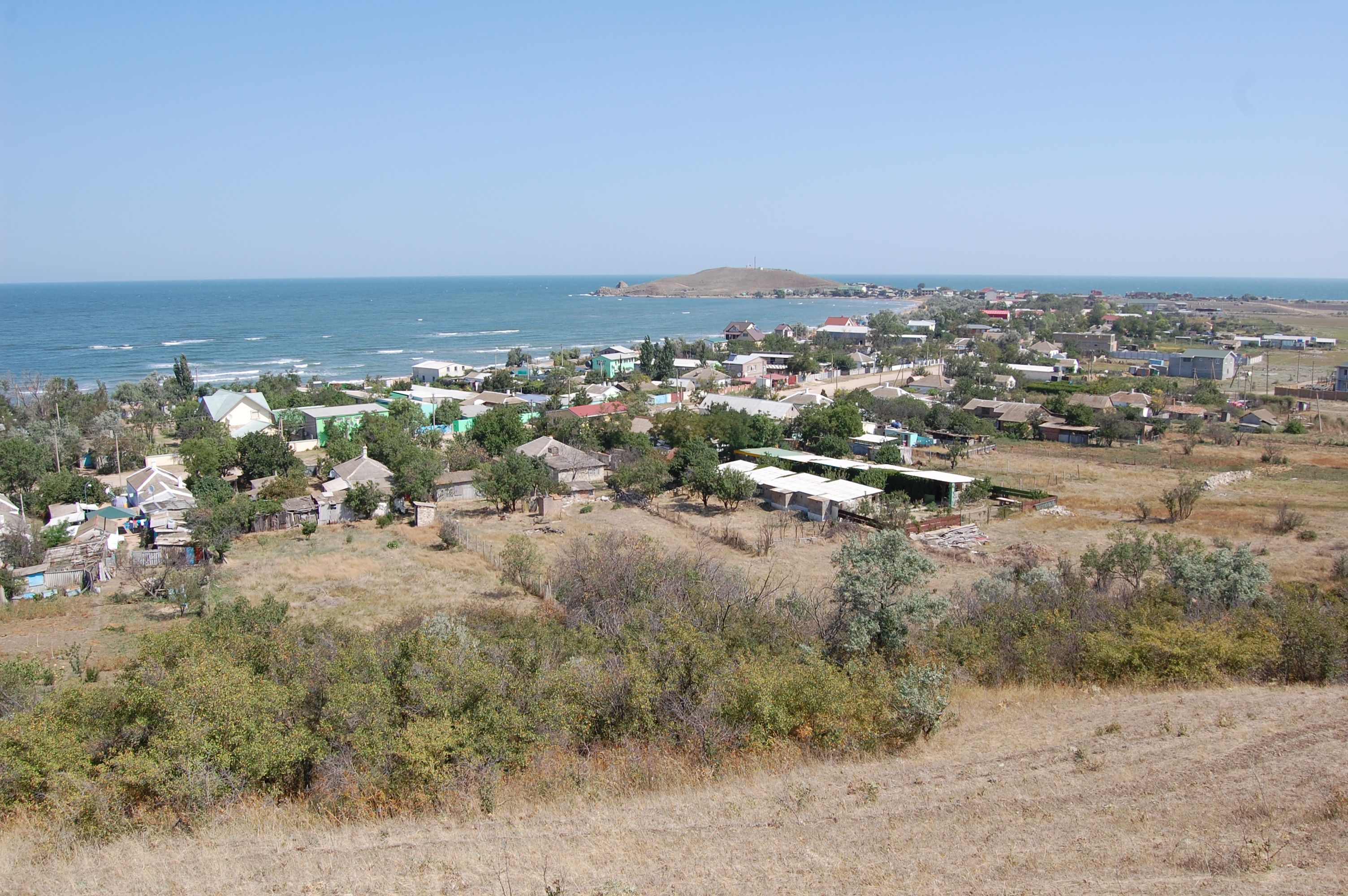

- Location of Kurortne in Crimea
- Coordinates: 45°28′27″N 36°20′32″E
- Country: Disputed; Russia, Ukraine
- Republic: Crimea
- Raion: Lenine
- Elevation: 0 m (0 ft)

Population (2014)
  - Total: 202
- Time zone: UTC+4 (MSK)
- Postal code: 98221
- Area code: +380 6557

Kurortne (Ukrainian: Курортне; Russian: Курортное; Crimean Tatar: Mama) is a village in the Lenine Raion of Crimea. Population: 202 (2014 Census).
