= Ukrainian patrol vessel Starobilsk =

Island-class patrol boat of the Ukrainian Navy

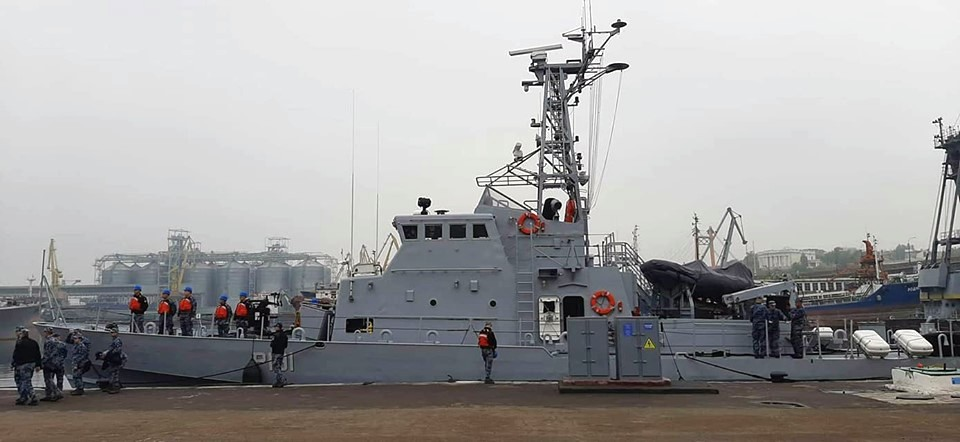
- Starobilsk in Odesa

History

United States
- Name: USCGC Drummond
- Namesake: Drummond Island, Michigan
- Builder: Bollinger Shipyard, Lockport, Louisiana
- Commissioned: 19 October 1988
- Home port: Miami Beach, Florida
- Identification: MMSI number: Unknown; Callsign: NRUF
- Motto: Keep On, Keepin' On
- Fate: Transferred to Ukraine

Ukraine
- Name: Starobilsk
- Namesake: Starobilsk
- Acquired: 27 September 2018
- In service: 13 November 2019
- Identification: Pennant number: P191

General characteristics
- Class & type: Island-class patrol boat
- Displacement: 164 tons
- Length: 110 ft (34 m)
- Beam: 21 ft (6.4 m)
- Draft: 6.5 ft (2.0 m)
- Propulsion: Twin Paxman-Valeta 16-CM RP-200M
- Speed: over 30 knots (56 km/h; 35 mph)
- Range: 9,900 miles
- Endurance: 6 days
- Boats & landing craft carried: 1 - RHI (90 HP outboard engine)
- Complement: 18 personnel (2 officers, 16 enlisted)
- Armament: 25 mm Mk 38 machine gun; 2 × .50 caliber machine gun

The Ukrainian patrol vessel Starobilsk (P191) is an Island-class patrol boat of the Naval Forces of Armed Forces of Ukraine, belonging to the 30th Surface Ships Division.

Originally named USCGC Drummond, named for Drummond Island, Michigan, for the United States Coast Guard and then, upon joining Ukraine, renamed for the town Starobilsk. Drummond was commissioned on 19 October 1988, at Bollinger Shipyard in Lockport, Louisiana and was last homeported in San Juan, Puerto Rico. With a top speed in excess of 30 knots (56 km/h; 35 mph) and a cruising speed of 26 knots (48 km/h; 30 mph), the ship is capable of enduring unsupported operations for six days and accommodates two officers and sixteen enlisted personnel.

The US Coast Guard's first Sentinel-class cutters were stationed in Florida, replacing Island-class cutters like Drummond.

== History ==
=== Service in the U.S. Coast Guard ===
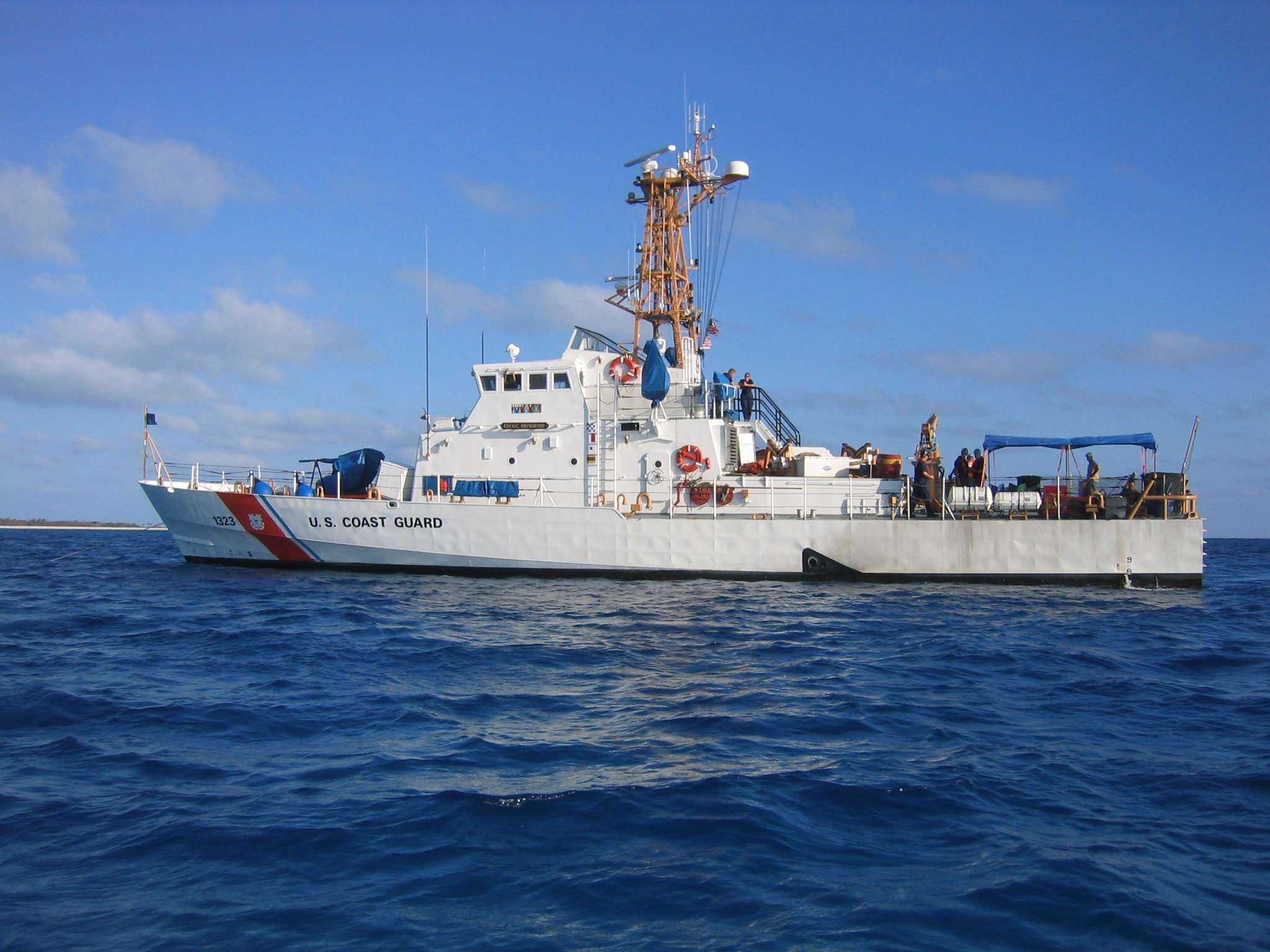
USCGC Drummond anchored off Cay Sal Island, Bahamas.

After commissioning, Drummond served in the U.S. Coast Guard's busiest district and was decorated for her involvement in a variety of operations. In 1992 and 1994, Drummond was awarded the Coast Guard Meritorious Unit Commendation while working with other U.S. Coast Guard and U.S. Navy units that combined for the safe interdiction of over 20,502 Haitian migrants at sea.

Originally homeported in Port Canaveral, Florida, Drummond's home port was changed to Key West in the summer of 2002. Typical patrols in Key West's area of operations involved search and rescue, migrant interdiction operations, fisheries law enforcement, counter narcotics operations, and homeland security. Drummond shifted homeports to Miami Beach in support of the Coast Guard's effort to maximize the operational hours of the patrol boats in the Seventh District by utilizing a dual-crew manning concept.

In April 2004, Drummond again returned to Haiti in support of Operation Able Sentry and Operation Secure Tomorrow as that country's poor political and economic situation generated an exodus of migrants. In 2005, Drummond was again awarded the Coast Guard Meritorious Unit Commendation for her efforts in stemming the illegal flow of Cuban migrants in the Florida Straits. Drummond also was credited for saving more than $500,000 in property during this period in search-and-rescue cases, including a daring rescue of a dismasted sailboat during Tropical Storm Arlene.

After 2004, Drummond was credited with interdicting over 550 illegal Cuban migrants in the Florida Straits, on eight go-fast vessels and 26 homebuilt boats and rafts. Drummond also recovered nearly 120 illegal migrants from various Bahamian islands, working closely with the Royal Bahamas Defence Force. Drummond cared for 1,600 illegal migrants on her decks while conducting 32 politically sensitive repatriations to Cabanas, Cuba.

=== Transfer to the Ukrainian Naval Forces ===
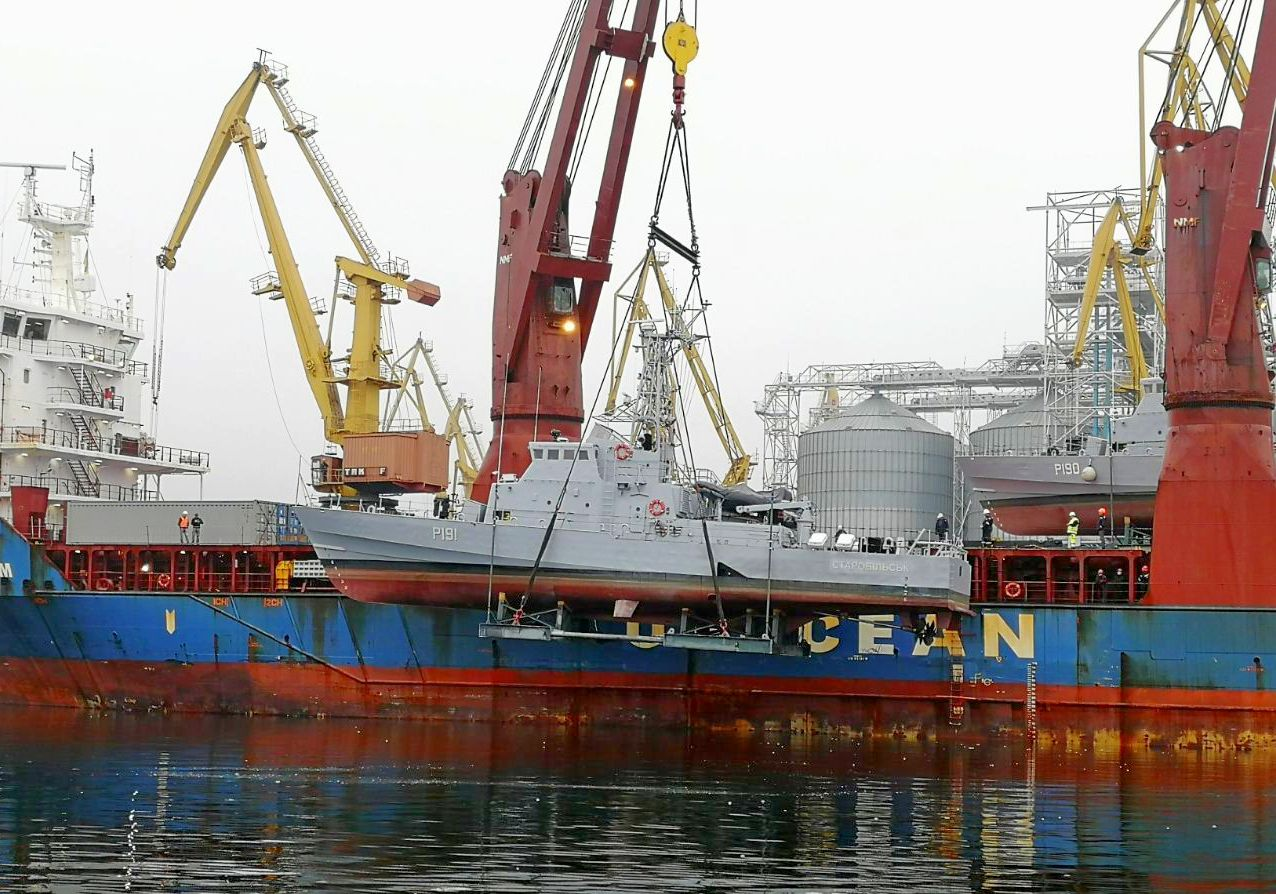
Unloading of the boats in Odesa.

On 27 September 2018, Drummond and USCGC Cushing were formally transferred to Ukraine, after their retirement from the US Coast Guard. The two vessels were shipped, as deck cargo, and arrived in Odesa on 21 October 2019.

The patrol boat was renamed after the Donbas town Starobilsk. This name perpetuates the memory of two deceased sailors, natives of the namesake town — sailor Olexandr Veremeyenko and senior sailor Stepan Kryl.
