= Exercise Sea Breeze =

Naval military exercise

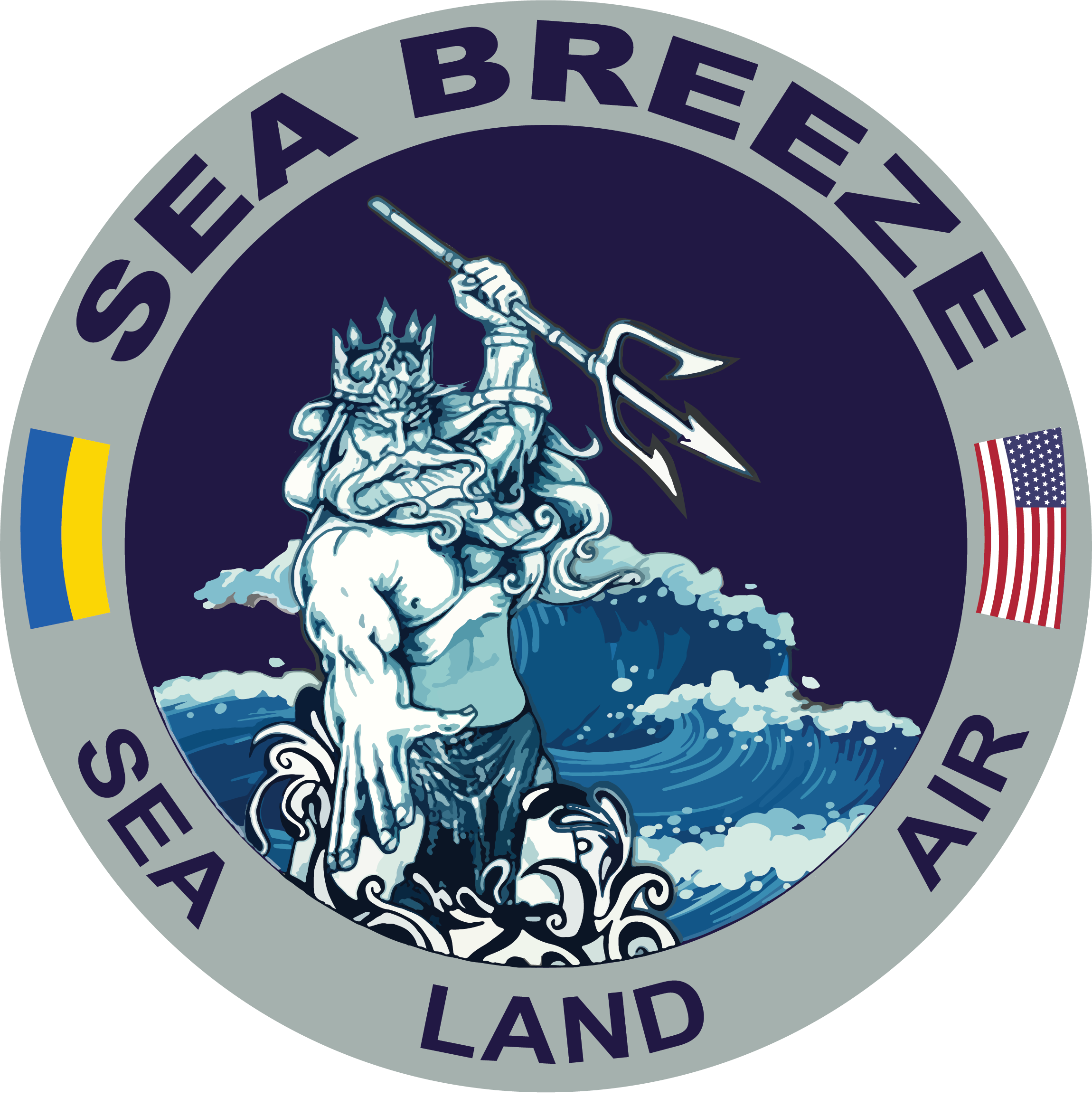
See Breeze 2021 logo

The Exercise Sea Breeze is an annual multinational military exercise regularly carried out since 1997 co-organized by Ukraine and the United States, with the participation of other NATO members. Later the geography of the exercise increased.

In 1998 Russia took part in the exercise.

== Skipped years ==
In 2000 it was cancelled due to the Kosovo War. In 2003 it was skipped due to other U.S. Navy's commitments.

It was planned, but not held in 2006 due to the 2006 anti-NATO protests in Feodosia.

In 2009 it was skipped due to lack of the Ukrainian legislation to provide status protection for U.S. ground forces to deploy to Ukraine. In 2022 it was skipped to the Russo-Ukrainian war.

== 1997 ==
It was held during August 25–31. The ground exercise was intended to be carried out at the Shyrokyi Lan training area near the Donuzlav Lake, Crimea. However due to harsh reactions of the Russian population of Crimea, as well as Russia, coming of the US troops ashore in Crimea was cancelled and the exercise was relocated to the mainland of Ukraine. While NATO countries were invited to send their ships to Donuzlav, only Turkey did so. To lessen the tensions, the exercise was vaguely described as "in the spirit of NATO's Partnership for Peace program", rather than "in the partnership with NATO". The naval part was carried out in the northwestern part of the Black Sea. The two US Navy ships were USS Ponce and the destroyer USS Spruance.

== 2026 ==
The exercise was conducted in two iterations. Sea Breeze 26-1 (June 3-19) was hosted by Romania in the Babadag Training Area and Danube Delta region. Sea Breeze 26-2, (July 13-24) was hosted by the United Kingdom in Portland.

Sea Breeze 2026 included forces from Bulgaria, Denmark, Estonia, France, Georgia, Greece, Japan, Latvia, Moldova, Poland, Romania, Spain, Sweden, Türkiye, Ukraine, the United Kingdom, the United States, and NATO Allied Maritime Command.
