= List of former warships of the Ukrainian Navy =

== List of the Navy of the Ukrainian People's Republic ships ==
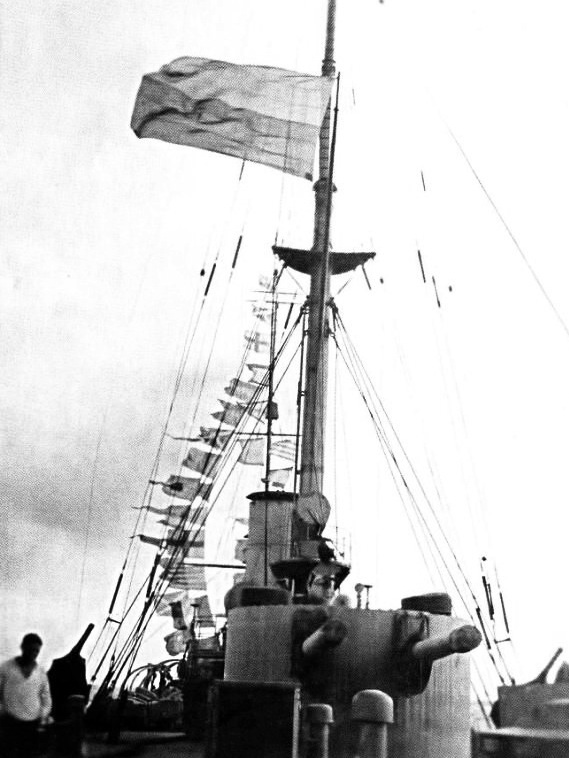
Yellow & blue flag on the cruiser Pamiat Merkuria, November 1917

On 17 October 1917, the 2nd rank Captain Ye.Akimov was appointed the representative of the Central Council of Ukraine at the command of the Black Sea Fleet. In November 1917, the Sahaidachny Sea Battalion (kurin) was established in Sevastopol, which, on 24 November 1917, was sent to Kiev and participated in the Kiev Arsenal January Uprising. On 29 December 1917, most of the Black Sea Fleet sided with the Bolsheviks. Earlier, in December 1917, the Ukrainian squadron led by the Russian battleship Imperator Aleksandr III, including another cruiser and three destroyers, participated in the evacuation of the 127th Infantry Division from Trebizond back to Ukraine.

=== Baltic Fleet ===
- Soviet cruiser Krasny Krym (12 October 1917)
- Russian destroyer Ukraina (12 October 1917)
- Russian destroyer Haidamak (12 October 1917)

=== Black Sea Fleet ===
- Russian battleship Georgii Pobedonosets (9 November 1917)
- Soviet cruiser Pamiat Merkuria (12 November 1917)
- Russian destroyer Zorkiy (12 November 1917)
- Russian destroyer Zvonkiy (12 November 1917)
- Russian battleship Imperator Aleksandr III (22 November 1917)
- Russian battleship Imperatritsa Ekaterina Velikaya

== Vessels captured during the Russian annexation of Crimea (2014) ==
List of captured ships of the Ukrainian Navy (at least 100 vessels). On 8 April 2014, an agreement had been reached between Russia and Ukraine to return captured vessels to Ukraine and "for the withdrawal of an undisclosed number of Ukrainian aircraft seized in Crimea". At the time, Russian naval sources claimed that the Ukrainian ships were "not operational because they are old, obsolete, and in poor condition". Four combatant ships (a Grisha corvette, a Polnocny small landing ship, a Yevgenya minesweeper, and a Matka ex-missile boat) and 31 various auxiliary vessels were returned to Ukraine by June 2014 at the latest; at least 9 vessels were not returned, but scrapped. All vessels returned were in service at their time of capture; all but one of the vessels (U926) confirmed to have been scrapped were decommissioned at their time of capture.

Class	Photo	Type	Ships	Displacement (Note: Full load (in long tons))	Origin	Commissioned	Note
Submarine (1 in service; 0 returned, 0 scrapped)
Foxtrot		Patrol submarine	U01 Zaporizhzhia (Note: Previously named B-435)	2,471.5 (Note: Submerged)	(Soviet Union) Novo-Admiralteyskiy Shipyard	1970	Was taken over by Russian forces but was deemed too obsolete to join Russia's Black Sea Fleet
Other warships (5 in service, 2 under construction, 2 decommissioned; 1 returned, 1 scrapped)
Grisha		Anti-submarine ships	U205 Lutsk (Note: Grisha V-class) (Note: Previously named MPK-85)	1,030	(Soviet Union) / (Ukraine) Leninska Kuznya	1993	All mentioned ships were raided by unidentified military, raised Russian flags. Vinnytsia was returned to Ukraine on 19 April 2014 and subsequently retired from service (see below). Lutsk and Ternopil were scheduled to be handed back to Ukraine in May 2014, but this never materialized at the time due to souring relations between the two countries. Both ships were described in 2018 as being in "poor condition" due to negligence. Putin stated that the ships were already in this condition when acquired Prior to retirement from service, Vinnytsia converted to training ship in 2018; subsequent to its retirement, sunk at moorings – seemingly after being damaged by Russia on 24 February 2022 (see below)
Grisha		Anti-submarine ships	A206 Vinnytsia (Note: Grisha II-class) (Note: Previously named Dnieper)	990	(Soviet Union) Zelenodolsk Shipyard	1976	
Grisha		Anti-submarine ships	U209 Ternopil	1,030	(Soviet Union) / (Ukraine) Leninska Kuznya	2006	
Pauk		Anti-submarine ships	U207 Uzhhorod (Note: Previously named MPK-93)	580	(Soviet Union) Yaroslavl	1982	Decommissioned in 2012 prior to capture (see below)
Pauk		Anti-submarine ships	U208 Khmelnytskyi (Note: Previously named MPK-116)	580	(Soviet Union) Yaroslavl	1985	Believed to have been hulked as floating barrack
Tarantul		Missile corvettes	U155 Pridneprovye (Note: Previously named R-54, then Nikopol)	540	(Soviet Union) Sredne-Nevsky Shipyard, Pontonny	1984	Believed to have been hulked as floating barrack
Tarantul		Missile corvettes	U156 Kremenchuk (Note: Previously named R-63)	540	(Soviet Union) Sredne-Nevsky Shipyard, Pontonny	1985	Decommissioned in 2013 prior to capture (see below); subsequently scrapped
Mukha		Small anti-submarine ships	U201 Lviv (Note: Previously named MPK-231)	475 (Note: Figures apply for finished vessels of these types)	(Soviet Union) / (Ukraine) More	Construction halted in 1992	Completion for Lviv 95% and Luhansk 60%, in More Shipyard, Feodosiya, Crimea
Mukha		Small anti-submarine ships	U203 Luhansk	475	(Soviet Union) / (Ukraine) More	Construction halted in 1992	Completion for Lviv 95% and Luhansk 60%, in More Shipyard, Feodosiya, Crimea
Fast attack craft (2 in service, 1 decommissioned; 1 returned, 1 scrapped)
Matka		Missile boats	P153 Pryluky (Note: Previously named R-262) (Note: Russia Today claims this was recaptured by Russia after the Battle of Berdiansk.)	257	(Soviet Union) Sredne-Nevsky Shipyard	1979	Pryluky returned to Ukraine in May 2014; Converted to patrol boat in 2018
Matka		Missile boats	U154 Kakhovka (Note: Previously named R-265)	257	(Soviet Union) Sredne-Nevsky Shipyard	1980	Kakhovka decommissioned in 2012 prior to capture (see below); subsequently scrapped in 2014
Shelon (project 1388N)		Gunboat (Note: Designed as a torpedo retriever)	U891 Kherson (Note: Previously named TL-1616, then Monastyryshche)	400	(Soviet Union) Sosnovka	1987	Despite reporting by Unian that it would be returned in 2014, Kherson remains under the control of the Russian Black Sea Fleet
Patrol ship (1 in service; 0 returned, 0 scrapped)
Flamingo (project 1415)		Anti-sabotage craft	U240 Feodosiya (Note: project R1415) (Note: Previously named P-99)	57	(Soviet Union) Sosnovka	1983	
Landing craft (2 in service, 1 decommissioned; 1 returned, 0 scrapped)
Ropucha		Landing ship tank	U402 Konstantin Olshanskiy	4,080	(Poland) Stocznia Północna, Gdańsk	1985	Preemptively disabled by own crew in anticipation of an assault, but reported back in service (with no name) under Russian command as part of the Black Sea Fleet, destined for Syria. Extensively disabled, no evidence for Ukrainian LST being repaired or put back in service by Russia
Polnocny-C		Mid-size landing ship	L401 Yuri Olefirenko (Note: Previously named SDK-137, then Kirovograd)	1,192	(Poland) Północna Shipyard	1971	Returned to Ukraine on 19 April 2014
Zubr		Air-cushioned landing craft	U423 Horlivka (Note: Previously named MDK-93)	550	(Soviet Union) More	1991	Horlivka decommissioned in 2011 prior to capture (see below); subsequently planned to be used as a monument
Mine warfare (3 in service, 2 decommissioned; 1 returned, 1 scrapped)
Yevgenya		Minesweeper	M360 Henichesk (Note: Previously named RT-214)	96.5	(Soviet Union) Sredne-Nevsky Shipyard	1985	Returned to Ukraine by June 2014 (inclusive); Sunk by Russia between 23 February-24 August 2022 (inclusive), during the Russian invasion of Ukraine (see below)
Natya		Minesweepers	U310 Chernihiv (Note: Previously named Zenitchik, then Zhovty Vody)	800	(Soviet Union) Sredne-Nevsky Shipyard	1974	Cherkasy reportedly tried twice to go around the ships scuttled by the Russians to block Donuzlav Bay. Her crew reportedly fended off one vigorous attempt by Russian speedboats to seize the vessel. She was eventually disabled and captured on 25 March by the tug Kovel, three speedboats, and two Mi-35 helicopters
Natya		Minesweepers	U311 Cherkasy (Note: Previously named Razvedchik)	800	(Soviet Union) Sredne-Nevsky Shipyard	1977	Cherkasy reportedly tried twice to go around the ships scuttled by the Russians to block Donuzlav Bay. Her crew reportedly fended off one vigorous attempt by Russian speedboats to seize the vessel. She was eventually disabled and captured on 25 March by the tug Kovel, three speedboats, and two Mi-35 helicopters
Sonya		Base minesweepers	U331 Mariupol (Note: Previously named Orenburgskiy Komsomolets, then BT-126)	450	(Soviet Union) Avangard Shipyard, Petrozavodsk	1978	Decommissioned in 2012 and 2013 respectively, prior to capture (see below); Melitopol subsequently scrapped
Sonya		Base minesweepers	U330 Melitopol (Note: Previously named BT-79)	450	(Soviet Union) Avangard Shipyard, Petrozavodsk	1979	Decommissioned in 2012 and 2013 respectively, prior to capture (see below); Melitopol subsequently scrapped
Special purpose RIB (6 in service; 0 returned, 0 scrapped)
«Willard»		RIB	2 vessels of type Sea Force 11M 1 vessel of type Sea Force 7M 3 vessels of type Sea Force 540	4 3 3	(United States) Willard Marine	2010	
Auxiliary vessels
Submersibles (5 in service, 1 awaiting repair, 1 decommissioned; 0 returned, 0 scrapped)
Omar		Deep sea submersible	Langust	9.8		1987	Used as a monument in the Kronstadt Patriot Park exhibition from 2018
Type Ryf		Deep sea submersible	Ryf	2.8		1985	Awaiting repair prior to capture Used as a monument in the Kronstadt Patriot Park exhibition from 2018
Type Sever-2 (project 1825)		Deep sea submersible	Sever-2 (Note: Not owned by the Navy, but operated by it)	40	(Soviet Union) New Admiralty Shipyard	1970	
Tethys (project 1605)		Manned underwater cameras (search and rescue)	1 vessel (Note: Type Tethys-N (project 16051)) (Note: Vessel most likely named BK-89-01 according to a linked source)	2.96	(Soviet Union) Leningrad	1990	
Tethys (project 1605)		Manned underwater cameras (search and rescue)	BK-72-05 (Note: Type Tethys (project 1605))	2.95	(Soviet Union) Leningrad	1974	Monument in Sevastopol prior to capture by 2013 (inclusive) at the latest (see below)
Agent-1		Remotely operated underwater vehicle (search and rescue)	Agent-1				
MTK-200		Remotely operated underwater vehicle (search and rescue)	1 vessel		Soviet Union	1970s	
Replenishment (2 in service, 1 decommissioned; 2 returned, 1 scrapped)
Toplivo (project 1844)		Tankers	U759 Bakhmach (Note: project 1844) (Note: Previously named VTN-81)	1,127	(Egypt) Alexandria shipyard	1972	Bakhmach decommissioned in 2013 prior to capture (see below) and subsequently scrapped
Toplivo (project 1844)		Tankers	A760 Fastiv (Note: project 1844D) (Note: Previously named VTN-38)	1,127	(Soviet Union) Kherson Shipyard	1981	Fastiv returned to Ukraine in April 2014 and subsequently retired from service (see below)
Boda (project 561)		Depot ship	A756 Sudak (Note: Previously named Sura)	2,115	(Soviet Union) Yantar Shipyard	1957	Returned to Ukraine in April 2014
Transport (1 in service, 1 decommissioned; 1 returned, 1 scrapped)
(project 1849)		Freight ship	A753 Horlivka (Note: Previously named Mezen, then Kryvyi Rih)	2,178	(Hungary) MHD Angyalföld Gyaregyseg	1965	Returned to Ukraine on 19 April 2014
Muna (project 1823)		Transport	U754 Dzhankoi (Note: Previously named VTR-93)	686	(Soviet Union) Rybinsk	1968	Dzhankoi decommissioned in 2013 prior to capture (see below); subsequently scrapped
Intelligence and research (2 in service, 2 decommissioned; 2 returned, 1 scrapped)
Moma (project 861)		Scout boat	U543 Simferopol (Note: Previously named Jupiter)	1,560	(Poland) Gdańsk Shipyard	1973	(2006–2012 training ship); Decommissioned in 2012 prior to capture (see below); subsequently scrapped in 2014
Yelva (project 535M)	Pochayiv A701	Diving support	A701 Pochayiv (Note: Previously named VM-152, then Krab)	285	(Soviet Union) Gorokhovets Shipyard	1973	Returned to Ukraine on 7 May 2014
Niryat (project 522)		Diving support	U707 Vilnohirsk (Note: Previously named VM-114, then Brody, then Alchevsk)	119	(Soviet Union) Rybinsk	1965	Decommissioned in 2013 prior to capture (see below)
(project 431PU) (Note: Designed as a seagoing dry cargo barge)		Diving support	A860 Kamianka (Note: Previously named MBSS-155150, then OS-94, then Kasatka)	323.7	(Soviet Union) Gorokhovets Shipyard	1957	Returned to Ukraine on 3 June 2014
Command and SAR/medevac (5 in service; 3 returned, 0 scrapped)
Amur (project 304)		Command and search and rescue ship	A500 Donbas (Note: Previously named PM-9, then Krasnodon)	5,520	(Poland) Szczecin Shipyard	1969	Returned to Ukraine in April 2014 and subsequently destroyed during the Siege of Mariupol (see below) (1991–2001 floating workshop)
Bambuk (project 12884)		Command ship	U510 Slavutych	5,830	(Soviet Union) / (Ukraine) Chernomorsky Shipbuilding Yard	1992	On 2 March, the crew of the Slavutych reportedly thwarted an attempt to capture the vessel by a boat manned by unidentified armed personnel
Goryn (project 714)		Rescue tugboat	U705 Kremenets (Note: Previously named SB-524)	2,210	(Finland) Rauma-Repola	1983	
Okhtenskiy (project 733S)		Search and rescue/ex-rescue tugboat	A706 Izjaslav (Note: Previously named SB-15)	934	(Soviet Union) Petrozavod, Leningrad	1962	Returned to Ukraine by June 2014 (inclusive)
Drakon (project SK620/II)		Ambulance vessel	A782 Sokal (Note: Previously named PSK-1410)	235.9	(Soviet Union) Azov ship-repair factory	1983	Returned to Ukraine on 7 May 2014 (1991–2006 communications boat)
Survey (5 in service, 1 decommissioned; 3 returned, 0 scrapped)
Bereza (project 130)		Degaussing ship	A811 Balta (Note: Previously named SR-568)	2,096	(Poland) Polnocna Shipyard	1987	Returned to Ukraine in April 2014; Converted to minelayer in 2022
Onega (project 18061)		Hydroacoustic monitoring	A812 Sieverodonetsk (Note: Previously named SFP-322)	1,460	(Soviet Union) Zelenodolsk Shipyard	1987	Returned to Ukraine by June 2014 (inclusive)
Niryat II (project 1896)		Large hydrographic survey boat	U635 Skvyra (Note: Previously named BGK-697)	126	(Soviet Union) Vympel Shipyard	1976	
Drofa (project 16830)		Small hydrographic survey boats	MGK-1694	5.4	(Soviet Union) Lazarevskoye	1987	MGK-1694 decommissioned in 2013 prior to capture (see below)
Drofa (project 16830)		Small hydrographic survey boats	A659 MGK-1877 (Note: One of the linked sources likely misnomers this as MGK-1887)	5.4	(Soviet Union) Sochi	1989	MGK-1877 returned to Ukraine by June 2014 (inclusive)
Drofa (project 16830)		Small hydrographic survey boats	U662 MGK-1889	5.4	(Soviet Union) Lazarevskoye	1989	
Fire rescue (2 in service; 2 returned, 0 scrapped)
Pozharny-I (project 364)		Firefighting	A722 Borshchiv (Note: Previously named PZhK-38)	180.8	(Soviet Union) Rybinsk	1954	Both returned to Ukraine (Evpatoria returned on 19 April 2014 and Borshchiv returned on 3 May 2014) and subsequently retired from service (see below)
Pozharny-I (project 364)		Firefighting	A728 Evpatoria (Note: Previously named PZhK-20)	180.8	(Soviet Union) Rybinsk	1954	Both returned to Ukraine (Evpatoria returned on 19 April 2014 and Borshchiv returned on 3 May 2014) and subsequently retired from service (see below)
Supply (4 in service; 4 returned, 0 scrapped)
Bryza (project 722U)		Dispatch cutter	A854 Dobropiljai (Note: Previously named UK-649, then Titan)	142.6	(Poland) Wisla Shipyard, Gdańsk	1975	Returned to Ukraine by June 2014 (inclusive); Previously a training boat
(project 1387)		Dispatch cutter	A853 Korosten (Note: Previously named KSV-9, then Chigrin, then Shulyaivka)	52.5	(Soviet Union) Feodosiya	1965	Returned to Ukraine on 7 May 2014
Shura (project 419)		AHTS vessel	A852 Shostka (Note: Previously named KIL-33)	3,151.4	(East Germany) Neptun Werft, Rostock	1976	Returned to Ukraine in April 2014
(project 1430)		Crew supply vessel	A783 Chornomorsk (Note: Previously named PSK-608, then Ilyichevsk)	75,7	(Soviet Union) Ilyichevsk Shipyard	1976	Returned to Ukraine by June 2014 (inclusive)
Tug (5 in service; 4 returned, 0 scrapped)
Prometey (project 498)		Seagoing tug	A947 Jani Kapu (Note: Previously named RB-308, then Krasnoperekopsk)	303	(Soviet Union) Gorokhovets Shipyard	1974	Returned to Ukraine by June 2014 (inclusive) (Note: Subsequently captured and re-released after the Kerch Strait incident); Recaptured in the Kerch Strait incident and returned to the Ukrainian Navy on 18 November 2019
Sorum		Seagoing tug	P186 Korets (Note: Previously named MB-30)	1,620	(Soviet Union) Zelenodolsk Shipyard	1973	Returned to Ukraine by June 2014 (inclusive) and subsequently captured by Russian forces following the Battle of Berdiansk (see below); Converted to patrol vessel in 2022
Goliat		Seagoing tug	A831 Kovel (Note: Previously named MB-51)	890	(Soviet Union) Petrozavod, Leningrad	1965	Returned to Ukraine on 19 April 2014
Sidehole (project 737M)		Harbor tug	U953 Dubno (Note: Previously named RB-295)	206	(Soviet Union) Petrozavod, Leningrad	1974	
(project T63OZh)		Towing tug	A942 Novoozerne (Note: Previously named BUK-261)	19.8	(Soviet Union) Kostroma	1956	Returned to Ukraine on 19 April 2014
Training (4 in service; 3 returned, 0 scrapped)
T43		Training ship (Note: Designed as a minesweeper)	U951 Velikaya Alexandrovka (Note: Previously named UTS-433)	577	(Soviet Union) Kerch	1956	
Petrushka (project UK-3)		Training boats	A540 Chyhyryn (Note: Previously named UK-96)	345.4	(Poland) Wisla Shipyard, Gdańsk	1984	Returned to Ukraine on 3 May 2014
Petrushka (project UK-3)		Training boats	A541 Smila (Note: Previously named UK-68)	345.4	(Poland) Wisla Shipyard, Gdańsk	1985	Returned to Ukraine on 3 May 2014
Petrushka (project UK-3)		Training boats	A542 Nova Kakhovka (Note: Previously named UK-65, then Darnitsa)	345.4	(Poland) Wisla Shipyard, Gdańsk	1986	Returned to Ukraine on 3 May 2014
Harbor cutters (10 in service, 3 awaiting repair, 4 decommissioned; 6 returned, 2 scrapped)
Flamingo (project 1415)		Diving cutters	U931 RK-1935	57	(Soviet Union) Sosnovka	1979	RK-1935 and Konotop decommissioned in 2013 prior to capture (see below)
Flamingo (project 1415)		Diving cutters	Konotop (Note: Previously named RK-1934)	57	(Soviet Union) Sosnovka	1981	RK-1935 and Konotop decommissioned in 2013 prior to capture (see below)
Flamingo (project 1415)		Diving cutters	A732 Romni (Note: project RV1415) (Note: Previously named RVK-1403)	43.2	(Soviet Union) Sosnovka	1981	Romni and Tokmak returned to Ukraine on 3 May 2014; Tokmak subsequently retired from service (see below)
Flamingo (project 1415)		Diving cutters	A733 Tokmak (Note: Previously named RVK-1475)	43.2	(Soviet Union) Sosnovka	1983	Romni and Tokmak returned to Ukraine on 3 May 2014; Tokmak subsequently retired from service (see below)
PO-2 (project 376)		Harbor diving boats	RVK-761 (Note: project RV376A)	41	Soviet Union	1971	Decommissioned in 2008 prior to capture (see below); Sunk at some point after decommissioning, possibly after capture; raised and then scrapped in 2020
PO-2 (project 376)		Harbor diving boats	Delfin (Note: project R376U) (Note: Previously named RK-395)	46.89	(Soviet Union) Sosnovka		Awaiting repair prior to capture
PO-2 (project 376)		Harbor diving boats	RK-1931	46.89	(Soviet Union) Sosnovka		Awaiting repair prior to capture; subsequently decommissioned
PO-2 (project 376)		Harbor patrol	U926	46.89	(Soviet Union) Sosnovka	1971	Previously owned by the Navy but operated by the Security Service of Ukraine; scrapped in 2019
(project 371)		Patrol cutters	U500-5 (Note: project 371U) (Note: U500-4 and U500-5 were boats of A500 Donbas, and were likely stationed with it when it was captured during the annexation of Crimea. In addition to the 33 named vessels out of the 35 confirmed to have been returned from Crimea, two unspecified smaller boats were returned. U500-4 and U500-5 remain in service and were probably the two boats in question.)	9.83	Soviet Union		U500-5, Admiralsky and RK-767 returned to Ukraine by June 2014 (inclusive); RK-767 subsequently retired from service (see below)
(project 371)		Patrol cutters	RK-1362 (Note: project 371) (Note: Last seen in Crimea prior to annexation, and not addressed in the Ukrainian report on post-Soviet division of the Black Sea Fleet)	9.41	(Soviet Union) Yaroslavl		U500-5, Admiralsky and RK-767 returned to Ukraine by June 2014 (inclusive); RK-767 subsequently retired from service (see below)
(project 371)		Patrol cutters	A001 Admiralsky	9.83	Soviet Union	1984	U500-5, Admiralsky and RK-767 returned to Ukraine by June 2014 (inclusive); RK-767 subsequently retired from service (see below)
(project 371)		Patrol cutters	U002 (Note: One of the linked sources likely misnomers this as RK-002)	9.41	(Soviet Union) Yaroslavl		U500-5, Admiralsky and RK-767 returned to Ukraine by June 2014 (inclusive); RK-767 subsequently retired from service (see below)
(project 371)		Patrol cutters	A925 RK-767	9.83	(Soviet Union) Rybinsk	1984	U500-5, Admiralsky and RK-767 returned to Ukraine by June 2014 (inclusive); RK-767 subsequently retired from service (see below)
(project 1394A)		Harbor patrol	RK-603	8.62	(Soviet Union) Lazarevskoye	1973	Decommissioned in 2005 prior to capture (see below)
Type Conrad-900 Aramis		Harbor patrol	RK-1695	3.5	(Poland) Gdańsk Shipyard		RK-1695 awaiting repair prior to capture
Strizh (project 1390)		Harbor patrol	U500-4 (Note: project 13901)	3.2	Soviet Union		U500-4 returned to Ukraine by June 2014 (inclusive)
Strizh (project 1390)		Harbor patrol	RK-735 (Note: project 1390)	3.2	Soviet Union	1964	RK-735 put into operation in the Russian Black Sea Fleet
Yachts (6 in service; 0 returned, 0 scrapped)
Type Cetus-136R		Yacht	Hermes	10	(Poland) Gdańsk Shipyard	1988	Put into operation under Russia
Type Alkor		Yacht	Fiolent	6.9	(Soviet Union) Leningrad Experimental Shipyards	1978	Put into operation under Russia
Type Tallinn 1/4 ton		Yachts	Antika	1.77	(Soviet Union) Tallinn Experimental Shipyard	1974	
Type Tallinn 1/4 ton		Yachts	Lira	1.77	(Soviet Union) Tallinn Experimental Shipyard		Lira put into operation in the Russian Black Sea Fleet
Type Tallinn 1/4 ton		Yachts	Spray	1.77	(Soviet Union) Tallinn Experimental Shipyard		
Type Conrad-25RT		Yacht	Yunona	1.5	(Poland) Gdańsk Shipyard		Put into operation under Russia
Special purpose boats and barges (5 in service, 2 decommissioned; 1 returned, 1 scrapped)
(project 1784)		Target ship	U948 SM-15	823	(Soviet Union) Zhovtnevoe	1963	Decommissioned in 2012 prior to capture (see below); subsequently scrapped in 2014
(project 1526)		Dry cargo barge	U761 Novgorod-Siversky (Note: Previously named MBSS-5200)	392	(Soviet Union) Ilyichevsk	1965	Decommissioned in 2004 prior to capture (see below)
(project 14630)		Oil and garbage collector	U954 MUS-482	208.8	(Soviet Union) Azov Shipyard	1983	
(project 814M)		Floating warehouse	A955 Zolotonosha (Note: Previously named PSKL-19)	2,064	(Soviet Union) Gorodets	1986	Returned to Ukraine on 19 April 2014, decommissioned in 2019 and sunk as a target ship in 2019 (see below)
(project 1758)		Floating dock	PD-51	9,620	(Bulgaria) Burgas	1978	Previously owned by the Navy but operated by a private owner; subsequently appropriated by that owner
(project 889)		Floating dock	PMR-152	1,332	(Soviet Union) Gorodets	1970	Previously owned by the Navy but operated by a private owner; subsequently appropriated by that owner
(project 771)		Crane vessel	U802 Kalanchak (Note: Previously named PK-23050)	1,524	(Soviet Union) Sevmorzavod, Sevastopol	1961	

== Vessels lost and captured during the Russo-Ukrainian War (2022) ==
Class	Photo	Type	Ships	Displacement	Shipyard	Commissioned	Fate
Warships (1 undergoing repair, 1 decommissioned)
Krivak III		Frigate	F130 Hetman Sahaydachniy (Note: Previously named Kirov)	3,510	(Soviet Union) / (Ukraine) Zaliv Shipyard	1993	Hetman Sahaydachniy, under major refit in Mykolaiv, was scuttled by her crew during the 2022 Russian invasion of Ukraine to avoid capture as a trophy
Grisha		Anti-submarine ship	A206 Vinnytsia	990	(Soviet Union) Zelenodolsk Shipyard	1976	Previously decommissioned in 2021 and converted to a museum ship (see below); Sunk at moorings, apparently after being damaged by Russia on 24 February 2022. Footage first publicly released in June 2022 (2018–2021 training ship)
Patrol ships (7 in service)
Sorum		Patrol vessel	P186 Korets	1,620	(Soviet Union) Zelenodolsk Shipyard	1973	Captured by Russian forces following the Battle of Berdiansk. (1991–2022 seagoing tugboat)
Island		Patrol boat	P190 Sloviansk (f/k/a USCGC Cushing)	168	(United States) Bollinger Shipyards	1988/2019	Sloviansk was sunk by a Russian anti-ship missile launched from an aircraft. Her entire crew was reported as missing
Gyurza-M		Patrol boats	P174 Akkerman	54	(Ukraine) Kuznya na Rybalskomu	2016	Akkerman and Vyshhorod captured by Russian forces following the Battle of Berdiansk.
Gyurza-M		Patrol boats	P179 Vyshhorod	54	(Ukraine) Kuznya na Rybalskomu	2018	Akkerman and Vyshhorod captured by Russian forces following the Battle of Berdiansk.
Gyurza-M		Patrol boats	P177 Kremenchuk	54	(Ukraine) Kuznya na Rybalskomu	2018	Kremenchuk captured by Russian forces during the Siege of Mariupol.
Gyurza-M		Patrol boats	P178 Lubny	54	(Ukraine) Kuznya na Rybalskomu	2018	Lubny sunk, and subsequently raised, by Russian forces during the Siege of Mariupol
PO-2 (project 376)	U172 Rivne	Small patrol gunboat	1 vessel	—N/a	Soviet Union	Unknown	1 unidentified PO-2 small patrol gunboat destroyed by a Russian ZALA Lancet strike no later than 17 April 2023
Landing craft (1 in service)
Centaur-LK		Fast assault [landing] craft	L450 Stanislav	47	(Ukraine) Kuznya na Rybalskomu	2019	Failed to pass state tests as of 6 February 2022. In commission with the Navy since 2019, but not included in its active combat fleet at that time. Between then and April 2022, according to Taras Chmut's reporting, accepted into active service. Sank by Russia on 7 May 2022 during the 2022 Snake Island campaign
Mine warfare (1 in service)
Yevgenya		Minesweeper	M360 Henichesk	96.5	(Soviet Union) Sredne-Nevsky Shipyard	1985	Sunk by Russia between 23 February-24 August 2022 (inclusive), during the Russian invasion of Ukraine
Auxiliary vessels
Unmanned surface vessels (16–24 in service)
(No formal type or project number) (Note: Propelled by a Sea-Doo waterjet)		Explosive/reconnaissance drone boats	16–24 vessels, including: Head no. 45V2NS1; Kit ta Yenot	1.18 (Note: Applies for the first version; the second version has a different design and possibly a different displacement)	Ukraine	2022	By October 2022, the Ukrainian Navy was reported to (probably) have received several dozen domestically-produced kamikaze drone boats. Reported detonations of these boats 1 was captured and subsequently destroyed by Russia in September 2022. In an attack on 29 October 2022, Russia claimed Ukraine used 7 USVs; independent analysis indicated the use of 6-8 vessels, among which at least 2 were destroyed by Russia and at least 3 detonated when they hit Russian vessels. 1 was reported to have detonated in an attack on the Sheskharis oil terminal in Novorossiysk on 17 November 2022. 3 were reported to have been destroyed by Russia in an attack on the Sevastopol naval base on 22 March 2023. 2 were reported to have been destroyed in an attack on the Sevastopol naval base on 24 April 2023. In an attack on the Russian Navy intelligence ship Ivan Khurs, of which footage was first released on 24 May 2023, Russia claimed 3 were destroyed. Footage indicated that 1 was destroyed by Ivan Khurs and 1 detonated upon impacting the ship. In an attack on the Russian Navy intelligence ship Priazovye, of which footage was released on 11 June 2023, Russia claimed 6 were destroyed and showed evidence of the destruction of Kit ta Yenot
Command and SAR/medevac (1 in service)
Amur (project 304)		Command and search and rescue ship	A500 Donbas	5,520	(Poland) Szczecin Shipyard	1969	Sunk during the Siege of Mariupol (1991–2001 floating workshop)
Survey (1 in service)
Rubin (project 1462)		Hydrographic boat	Dmitry Chubar	148	(Soviet Union) Krasny Moryak, Rostov-on-Don	1985	Vessel most likely captured between the beginning of the full-scale invasion and 20 May 2022 (inclusive); in 2021, it was reported to be deployed in Berdyansk, east of the Kerch Strait – prior to this. Later in 2022, its capture was confirmed due to a change in the ship's registration. As of 2023, it is operated by the Russian port authorities in occupied Mariupol
Intelligence & Research (1 in service)
Project 502		Spy ship	Simferopol	1,220	Odesa	2021	On 28 August 2025, the ship was sunk after a Russian naval drone strike in the delta of the Danube River. Videos posted later confirmed that the ship was hit.
Training (1 in service)
Petrushka Project UK-3		Training boat	Chyhyryn	345.4	Odesa	1984	

== Decommissioned and sold ships ==
Note: (Note: Not counting those recommissioned by or sent to the Ukrainian Special Operations Forces (an unspecified number of Sirena-class midget submarines), the Ukrainian Sea Guard or any other branch of the State Border Guard Service of Ukraine, the (state-owned) hydrographic service of Ukraine, the State Tax Service of Ukraine, the State Emergency Service of Ukraine or the (state-owned) Odesa Commercial Seaport)

Class	Photo	Type	Ships	Displacement	Origin	Commissioned	Decommissioned
Submarines (3 unlisted)
Triton-2 (project 908)		Midget submarines	V-504	15.5	(Soviet Union) Leningrad Admiralty Association	1982	All decommissioned by the end of 2010 and subsequently scrapped by 2017 (inclusive) at the latest
Triton-2 (project 908)		Midget submarines	V-509	15.5	(Soviet Union) Leningrad Admiralty Association	1983	All decommissioned by the end of 2010 and subsequently scrapped by 2017 (inclusive) at the latest
Triton-2 (project 908)		Midget submarines	V-528	15.5	(Soviet Union) Leningrad Admiralty Association	1984	All decommissioned by the end of 2010 and subsequently scrapped by 2017 (inclusive) at the latest
Other warships (11 unlisted)
Krivak		Frigates	U134 Dnipropetrovsk (Note: Krivak I-class) (Note: Previously named Bezzavetny)	3,190	(Soviet Union) Zaliv Shipbuilding yard	1978	Unlisted in 2000; Sunk in 2005 while being towed in the Black Sea
Krivak		Frigates	U133 Mykolaiv (Note: Previously named Bezukoriznenny)	3,190	(Soviet Union) Zaliv Shipbuilding yard	1979	Unlisted in 2001; Scrapped in 2001
Krivak		Frigates	U132 Sevastopol (Note: Krivak II-class) (Note: Previously named Razitelny)	3,305	(Soviet Union) Yantar Shipyard	1974	Unlisted in 2004; Sold to Turkey in 2005; subsequently scrapped
Petya		Multipurpose frigate	U132 Otaman Bilyi (Note: Previously named SKR-112)	1,150	(Soviet Union) Yantar Shipyard	1968	Unlisted: 1993, never really entered service; better known by its previous name Subsequently scrapped
Grisha		Anti-submarine ships	U209 Sumy (Note: Grisha I-class) (Note: Previously named MPK-52)	990	(Soviet Union) Leninska Kuznya	1974	Decommissioned in 1998; Subsequently scrapped
Grisha		Anti-submarine ships	U210 Kherson (Note: Previously named MPK-43)	990	(Soviet Union) Zelenodolsk Shipyard	1971	Decommissioned in 1999; Subsequently scrapped
Grisha		Anti-submarine ships	U205 Chernihiv (Note: Also named Izmail)	990	(Soviet Union) Leninska Kuznya	1980	Decommissioned in 2005; Sank during scrapping in 2010
Grisha		Anti-submarine ships	A206 Vinnytsia	990	(Soviet Union) Leninska Kuznya	1976	Decommissioned in 2021 (to become a museum ship) (2018–2021 training ship); Sunk at moorings after being damaged by Russia on 24 February 2022 (see above)
Pauk		Anti-submarine ship	U207 Uzhhorod	580	(Soviet Union) Yaroslavl	1982	Unlisted: 2012; Subsequently captured during the Russian annexation of Crimea (see above)
Tarantul		Missile corvette	U156 Kremenchuk	540	(Soviet Union) Sredne-Nevsky Shipyard, Pontonny	1985	Unlisted: 2012; Subsequently captured during the Russian annexation of Crimea and scrapped (see above)
T43		Gun-ship (Note: Similar displacement to corvettes of the same era)	U861 Svitlovodsk (Note: Previously named OS-35)	544	(Soviet Union) Shipyard No. 363, Pontonny	1954	Unlisted: 1999 (1991–1995 minesweeper); Subsequently scrapped
Fast attack craft (4 unlisted)
Matka		Missile boats	U150 Konotop (Note: Previously named R-15)	257	(Soviet Union) Sredne-Nevsky Shipyard, Pontonny	1981	1999 given away to Georgia
Matka		Missile boats	U151 Tsyurupinsk (Note: Previously named R-251)	257	(Soviet Union) Sredne-Nevsky Shipyard, Pontonny	1981	Decommissioned in 2000 and subsequently scrapped
Matka		Missile boats	U152 Uman (Note: Previously named R-260)	257	(Soviet Union) Sredne-Nevsky Shipyard, Pontonny	1979	Decommissioned in 2008
Matka		Missile boats	U154 Kakhovka	257	(Soviet Union) Sredne-Nevsky Shipyard, Pontonny	1980	Decommissioned in 2012; subsequently captured during the Russian annexation of Crimea and scrapped in 2014 (see above)
Patrol ship (1 unlisted)
Zhuk 1400		Small patrol gunboat	AK-22	40	(Soviet Union) More Shipyard	1968–1973	1994
Landing craft (7 unlisted)
Alligator		Landing ship	U762 Rivne (Note: Previously named Ilya Azarov)	4,946	(Soviet Union) Yantar Shipyard	1971	Unlisted: 2004 – sold to a private client (1997–2004 cargo ship); Sunk and then raised in 2006; taken to Turkey to be scrapped in 2007
Zubr		Air-cushioned landing craft	U422 Kramatorsk (Note: Previously named MDK-57)	550	(Soviet Union) More	1988	Unlisted in 1999; Subsequently scrapped
Zubr		Air-cushioned landing craft	U424 Artemivsk (Note: Previously named MDK-123)	550	(Soviet Union) More	1989	Unlisted in 2000; Subsequently scrapped
Zubr		Air-cushioned landing craft	U421 Ivan Bohun (Note: Previously named MDK-100)	550	(Soviet Union) / (Ukraine) More	2001	2001 sold to Greece
Zubr		Air-cushioned landing craft	U420 Donetsk (Note: Previously named MDK-100)	550	(Soviet Union) / (Ukraine) More	1993	Unlisted in 2008; Subsequently scrapped
Zubr		Air-cushioned landing craft	U423 Horlivka	550	(Soviet Union) More	1991	Unlisted in 2011; subsequently captured during the Russian annexation of Crimea (see above)
(project 1785)		Small landing craft	U431 Bryanka (Note: Previously named D-455, then Tarpan)	102	(Soviet Union) Azov Shipyard	1970	Decommissioned in 2013
Mine warfare (2 unlisted)
Sonya		Base minesweepers	U331 Mariupol	450	(Soviet Union) Sredne-Nevsky Shipyard	1978	Unlisted in 2012 and 2013 respectively. Both subsequently captured during the Russian annexation of Crimea; Melitopol scrapped while under Russian control (see above)
Sonya		Base minesweepers	U330 Melitopol	450	(Soviet Union) Sredne-Nevsky Shipyard	1979	Unlisted in 2012 and 2013 respectively. Both subsequently captured during the Russian annexation of Crimea; Melitopol scrapped while under Russian control (see above)
Auxiliary vessels
Submersibles (5 unlisted)
Tethys (project 1605)		Manned underwater cameras (search and rescue)	1 vessel (Note: Vessel most likely named BK-89-02 according to a linked source)	2.96	(Soviet Union) Leningrad	1990	Most likely inherited by the Navy after the fall of the USSR along with other Tethys and Tethys-N manned underwater cameras Most likely decommissioned and sold to a private client by 2013 (inclusive) at the latest, as it was used a monument on this client's territory in 2013
Tethys (project 1605)		Manned underwater cameras (search and rescue)	1 vessel (Note: Vessel most likely named BK-89-04 according to a linked source)	2.96	(Soviet Union) Leningrad	1990	Most likely inherited by the Navy after the fall of the USSR along with other Tethys and Tethys-N manned underwater cameras Decommissioned and sold to a private client by 2013 (inclusive) at the latest
Tethys (project 1605)		Manned underwater cameras (search and rescue)	BK-72-03	2.95	(Soviet Union) Leningrad	1973	Most likely inherited by the Navy after the fall of the USSR along with other Tethys and Tethys-N manned underwater cameras Decommissioned and used as a monument in Chornomorsk by 2013 (inclusive) at the latest
Tethys (project 1605)		Manned underwater cameras (search and rescue)	BK-72-05	2.95	(Soviet Union) Leningrad	1974	Decommissioned and used as a monument in Sevastopol by 2013 (inclusive) at the latest; captured during the Russian annexation of Crimea (see above)
Tethys (project 1605)		Manned underwater cameras (search and rescue)	BK-72-06	2.95	(Soviet Union) Leningrad	1974	Most likely inherited by the Navy after the fall of the USSR along with other Tethys and Tethys-N manned underwater cameras Most likely decommissioned and sold to a private client by 2013 (inclusive) at the latest, as it was used a monument on this client's territory in 2013
Replenishment (6 unlisted)
Boris Chilikin		Fleet oiler	U757 Makeyevka (Note: Previously named Boris Chilikin)	22,460	(Soviet Union) Baltic Shipyard	1970	Decommissioned in 2001 and sold to a private client in 2002; subsequently scrapped in 2004
Type Dubna		Medium sea tanker	U758 Kerch (Note: Previously named Sventa)	12,891	(Finland) Rauma-Repola	1979	Decommissioned in 2001 and converted to a civil vessel in the same year; subsequently scrapped in 2004
Toplivo (project 1844)		Tankers	U759 Bakhmach	1,127	(Egypt) Alexandria shipyard	1972	Decommissioned in 2013; subsequently captured during the Russian annexation of Crimea and scrapped (see above)
Toplivo (project 1844)		Tankers	A760 Fastiv	1,127	(Soviet Union) Kherson Shipyard	1981	Decommissioned in 2019; sunk in 2020
(project 440)		Electric power station	U813 Berdychiv (Note: Previously named ENS-5)	1,920	(Soviet Union) Okean Shipyard	1966	Decommissioned in 2004; Sold to a private client in 2005; subsequently sent to Turkey for scrapping
Boda (project 561)		Depot ship	A756 Sudak (Note: Previously named Sura)	2,115	(Soviet Union) Yantar Shipyard	1957	Vessel returned to the Ukrainian Navy from Crimea in April 2014
Transport (4 unlisted)
(project 233)		Large seagoing dry cargo transport	Volga	6,700	East Germany		Decommissioned in 2004
(project 502R)		Seagoing refrigerator transport	U755 Yalta (Note: Previously named Buzuluk)	965	(Soviet Union) Yaroslavl	1971	Decommissioned in 1997, converted to a civil vessel and sold to a private client
Muna (project 1823)		Transport	U754 Dzhankoi	686	(Soviet Union) Rybinsk	1968	Unlisted: 2013; Subsequently captured during the Russian annexation of Crimea and scrapped (see above)
(project 14301)		Passenger ship	U781 Ostrog	99.7	(Soviet Union) / (Ukraine) Kherson Shipyard	1993 (Note: Built in that year. Unclear when first commissioned)	Decommissioned in 2013; scrapped in 2018
Intelligence and research (6 unlisted)
Moma (project 861)		Scout boat	U543 Simferopol	1,560	(Poland) Gdańsk Shipyard	1973	Unlisted: 2012 (2006–2012 training ship); Subsequently captured during the Russian annexation of Crimea and scrapped in 2014 (see above)
Project 431PU		Diving support	A860 Kamianka	323.7	(Soviet Union) Vyborg Shipyard	1957	Decommissioned in 2016. In storage at Ochakov.
Niryat (project 522)		Diving support	U709 Energodar (Note: Previously named VM-14)	119	(Soviet Union) Petrozavod shipyard	1960	Decommissioned in 2004, converted to a civil vessel and sold to a private client
Niryat (project 522)		Diving support	U707 Vilnohirsk	119	(Soviet Union) Rybinsk	1965	Decommissioned in 2013 and subsequently captured during the Russian invasion of Crimea (see above)
Stend (project 1236)		Research boat	U863 Artsyz (Note: Previously named OS-100)	943	(Soviet Union) Zelenodolsk Shipyard	1972	Decommissioned in 2000; subsequently scrapped
Vydra (project 106K)		Research boat	U862 Korosten (Note: Previously named OS-237)	610	Soviet Union	1966	Decommissioned in 2004
Command and SAR/medevac (3 unlisted)
Vytegrales II (project 596P)		Search and rescue/Control	U702 Chernivtsi (Note: Previously named Baskunchak)	7,230	(Soviet Union) Leningrad	1968	Both decommissioned in 1999; subsequently scrapped
Vytegrales II (project 596P)		Search and rescue/Control	U704 Ivano-Frankivsk (Note: Previously named Taman)	7,230	(Soviet Union) Leningrad	1967	Both decommissioned in 1999; subsequently scrapped
Okhtenskiy (project 733S)		Search and rescue vessel/ex-rescue tug	A706 Izjaslav (Note: Previously named SB-15)	934	(Soviet Union) Petrozavod, Leningrad	1962	Vessel returned to the Ukrainian Navy from Crimea by June 2014 (inclusive) at the latest Decommissioned in 2015.
Survey (4 unlisted)
(project 220)		Degaussing ship	SR-173	659	(Finland) Wärtsilä Crichton-Vulcan	1953-1957 (Note: Built between these years (inclusive). Unclear when first commissioned)	Decommissioned and converted to a civil vessel; subsequently decommissioned in this role by 2020 at the latest
Drofa (project 16830)		Small hydrographic survey boat	MGK-1694	5.4	(Soviet Union) Lazarevskoye	1987	Decommissioned in 2013; Subsequently captured during the Russian invasion of Crimea (see above)
Drofa (project 16830)		Small hydrographic survey boat	A659 MGK-1877 (Note: One of the linked sources likely misnomers this as MGK-1887)	5.4	(Soviet Union) Sochi	1989	Vessel returned to the Ukrainian Navy from Crimea by June 2014 (inclusive) at the latest
Onega (project 18061)		Hydroacoustic monitoring	A812 Sieverodonetsk (Note: Previously named SFP-322)	1,460	(Soviet Union) Zelendolsk Shipyard	1987	Vessel returned to the Ukrainian Navy from Crimea by June 2014 (inclusive) at the latest
Fire rescue (2 unlisted)
Pozharny-I (project 364)		Firefighting	A722 Borshchiv	180.8	(Soviet Union) Rybinsk	1954	Both decommissioned in 2019
Pozharny-I (project 364)		Firefighting	A728 Evpatoria	180.8	(Soviet Union) Rybinsk	1954	Both decommissioned in 2019
Supply (2 unlisted)
Shelon (project 1388N)		Torpedo retriever	U890 Malin (Note: Previously named TL-1005)	400	(Soviet Union) Sosnovka	1974	Decommissioned in 2002
Klazma (project 1274)		Cable layer	U851 Novi Bug (Note: Previously named Tsna)	7,031	(Finland) Oy Wärtsilä Ab Turku Shipyard	1968	Decommissioned in 2004 and sold to a private client in the same year
Tug (6 unlisted)
Type Z		Harbor tug	RB-69	360	(Nazi Germany) Regensburg	1941	Decommissioned, renamed and sold to a private client in 1997
Type O		Harbor tug	U944 Mikhalych (Note: Previously named RB-27)	190	(Nazi Germany) Linz	1940	Leased by the Navy to a private client from 1996; Decommissioned, renamed and sold to Romania all between 2002 and 2004 (inclusive)
(project T63OZh)		Towing tug	U943 BUK-300	19.8	(Soviet Union) Kostroma	1956	Decommissioned in 2004
(project T63OZh)		Towing tug	A941 BUK-239	19.8	(Soviet Union) Kostroma	1954	Decommissioned in 2014.
(project T63OZh)		Towing tug	A942 Novoozerne (Note: Previously named BUK-261)	19.8	(Soviet Union) Rybinsk	1955	Vessel returned to the Ukrainian Navy from Crimea on 19 April 2014 Decommissioned in 2015.
Goliat		Seagoing tug	A831 Kovel (Note: Previously named MB-51)	890	(Soviet Union) Petrozavod, Leningrad	1965	Vessel returned to the Ukrainian Navy from Crimea on 19 April 2014 Decommissioned in 2015.
Harbor cutters (23 unlisted)
Flamingo (project 1415)		Diving cutters	U931 RK-1935	57	(Soviet Union) Sosnovka	1979	RK-1935 and Konotop decommissioned in 2013; Both subsequently captured during the Russian invasion of Crimea (see above)
Flamingo (project 1415)		Diving cutters	Konotop	57	(Soviet Union) Sosnovka	1981	RK-1935 and Konotop decommissioned in 2013; Both subsequently captured during the Russian invasion of Crimea (see above)
Flamingo (project 1415)		Diving cutters	A733 Tokmak	43.2	(Soviet Union) Sosnovka	1983	Tokmak decommissioned in 2021
PO-2 (project 376)		Harbor diving boats	RVK-5	41	(Soviet Union) Sosnovka	1959	RVK-5, Mirgorod, RK-936 and RK-1036 decommissioned in 2004; Mirgorod subsequently scrapped
PO-2 (project 376)		Harbor diving boats	U731 Mirgorod (Note: project RV376U) (Note: Previously named RVK-493)	38.2	(Soviet Union) Sosnovka	1977	RVK-5, Mirgorod, RK-936 and RK-1036 decommissioned in 2004; Mirgorod subsequently scrapped
PO-2 (project 376)		Harbor diving boats	RK-936	38.2	(Soviet Union) Sosnovka		RVK-5, Mirgorod, RK-936 and RK-1036 decommissioned in 2004; Mirgorod subsequently scrapped
PO-2 (project 376)		Harbor diving boats	RK-1036	43.2	(Soviet Union) Sosnovka	1973	RVK-5, Mirgorod, RK-936 and RK-1036 decommissioned in 2004; Mirgorod subsequently scrapped
PO-2 (project 376)		Harbor diving boats	RVK-761	41	Soviet Union	1971	RVK-761 decommissioned in 2008 and subsequently captured during the Russian invasion of Crimea (see above); Sunk at some point after decommissioning, possibly after capture; raised and then scrapped in 2020
(project 371) (Note: All are of project 371U)		Patrol cutters	Shiryaevo	9.83	(Soviet Union) Vympel Shipyard		Decommissioned in 2004
(project 371)		Patrol cutters	A932 RK-1942	9.83	(Soviet Union) Rybinsk	1984	Decommissioned in 2019
(project 371)		Patrol cutters	A925 RK-767	9.83	(Soviet Union) Rybinsk	1982	Decommissioned in 2021
(project 366)		Regatta harbor boat	Head no. 7634				Decommissioned in 2004
Sochi (project RK-26S)		Harbor patrol	Sochi		(Soviet Union) Lazarevskoye	1968	Decommissioned in 2004
Rhythm-450 (project 299)		Harbor patrol	Head no. 1370	1.5	(Soviet Union) Leningrad Experimental Shipyard	1984	Head no. 1370 and head no. 1371 decommissioned in 2004
Rhythm-450 (project 299)		Harbor patrol	Head no. 1371	1.5	(Soviet Union) Leningrad Experimental Shipyard	1984	Head no. 1370 and head no. 1371 decommissioned in 2004
Rhythm-450 (project 299)		Harbor patrol	Head no. 851385	1.5	(Soviet Union) Leningrad Experimental Shipyard		Head no. 851385 decommissioned in 2013
(project 1394A)		Harbor patrol	RK-603	8.62	(Soviet Union) Lazarevskoye	1973	Decommissioned in 2005 and converted to a civil vessel in the same year Subsequently captured during the Russian invasion of Crimea (see above)
Strizh (project 1390)		Harbor patrol	RK-1346	3.2	Soviet Union	1968	Decommissioned in 2004
Strizh (project 1390)		Harbor patrol	A923	3.2	Soviet Union		
(project LM-4-87MK)		Harbor patrol	Head no. 574 (Note: One of the linked sources likely misnomers this as head no. 47547)	2.15	(Soviet Union) Svir Shipyard, Nikolsky	1985	Both decommissioned in 2004
(project LM-4-87MK)		Harbor patrol	Head no. 578	2.15	(Soviet Union) Svir Shipyard, Nikolsky	1985	Both decommissioned in 2004
(project LM-87MK)		Harbor patrol	Head no. 532 (Note: Also a measuring boat) (Note: One of the linked sources likely misnomers this as head no. 32532)	2.15	(Soviet Union) Svir Shipyard, Nikolsky		Both decommissioned in 2004
(project LM-87MK)		Harbor patrol	Borey	2.15	Soviet Union	1984	Both decommissioned in 2004
(project 363M)		Harbor support	RBK-60	25.5	(Soviet Union) Shipyard No. 345, Yaroslavl	1960	Decommissioned in 2004
Special purpose boats and barges (21 unlisted)
(project DD-17)		Barracks ship	PKZ-69			1980	Decommissioned in 2004
Danube-sea (project 1635K)		Target ships	SM-1	1,300		1986 (Note: Built in that year. Unclear when first commissioned)	Both decommissioned in 2021 (previously used as target ships for testing the R-360 Neptune anti-ship cruise missile)
Danube-sea (project 1635K)		Target ships	SM-2	1,300	(Soviet Union) Kiliia	1988	Both decommissioned in 2021 (previously used as target ships for testing the R-360 Neptune anti-ship cruise missile)
(project 1784)		Target ship	U948 SM-15	823	(Soviet Union) Zhovtnevoe	1963	Decommissioned in 2012; subsequently captured during the Russian annexation of Crimea and scrapped in 2014 (see above)
(project 436B)		Target barge	Target shield no. 22	142	Soviet Union	1981–1983	Decommissioned in 2004
BAMT-14790		Artillery barge	U906 BAMT-14790			1942	Decommissioned in 1996, sold to a private client and renamed in the same year; subsequently scrapped in 2000
(project 106)		Dry cargo barge	U904 Bilyaivka (Note: Previously named BSS-699200)	534	(Soviet Union) Kherson Shipyard	1965	Decommissioned in 2004
(project 1526)		Dry cargo barge	U761 Novgorod-Siversky	392	(Soviet Union) Ilyichevsk	1965	Decommissioned in 2004; Subsequently captured during the Russian invasion of Crimea (see above)
BSS-35085		Dry cargo barge	BSS-35085	85	Nazi Germany	1940	Decommissioned in 2013
BSS-34125		Dry cargo barge	BSS-34125 Bryanka		Nazi Germany	1940	Decommissioned in 2013
BNN-86980		Barge	BNN-86980		Nazi Germany	1945	Decommissioned in 2000; sold to a private client, converted to a floating dock and renamed in 2010
PMR-66		Floating repair station barge	BSN-188595		Austria	1926	Decommissioned in 2013
Sovremenny		Floating storage barge (Note: Designed (but unfinished) as a destroyer)	Vnushitelnyy	7,940 (Note: This is the displacement of a finished Sovremenny-class destroyer, but the displacement of Vnushitelnyy is likely to be smaller as construction of the destroyer was abandoned and the remaining hull was launched as this floating storage barge)	(Soviet Union) Mykolaiv	1987	Scrapped in 1996
(project 1515)		Oil and garbage collector	MUS-857	39.12	(Soviet Union) Azov Shipyard	1974	Decommissioned in 2004
(project 814M)		Floating warehouse	A955 Zolotonosha	2,064	(Soviet Union) Gorodets	1986	Decommissioned in 2019 and sunk as a target ship in the same year
Oskol I (project 300)		Floating workshop	Olvia (Note: Previously named PM-2)	2,546	(Poland) Szczecin Shipyard	1964	Decommissioned in 2000 and scrapped in the same year
(project SPD-201)		Floating docks	U950 PD-19 Khmilnyk (Note: Previously named PD-26)		(Soviet Union) Mykolaiv	1979	Decommissioned in 2004 and sold to a private client in the same year
(project SPD-201)		Floating docks	U949 PD-23 Berestechko		(Soviet Union) Mykolaiv	1977	Decommissioned in 2008 and sold to a private client in the same year
Lama (project 2001)		Floating dock	U533 Kolomyia (Note: Previously named PRTB-13)	4,770	(Soviet Union) Chernomorsky	1971	Decommissioned in 1999; subsequently scrapped
(project D-9030)		Crane vessel	U804 Sarny (Note: Previously named PK-112025)	1,060	(Hungary) Budapest	1983	Decommissioned in 2004 and sold to a private client in the same year
(project 4LDG)		Crane vessel	Kagarlik (Note: Previously named PK-81005)	328	(Hungary) Gheorgiu-Dej	1965	Decommissioned in 2000 and sold to a private client

== Never completed ==
Class	Photo	Type	Ships	Displacement	Origin	Laid down	Fate
Warships (6 unlisted)
Kuznetsov		Aircraft carrier	Varyag	60,900	(Soviet Union) Shipyard 444	1985	1998 sold to China as unfinished 68%
Slava		Missile cruiser	Ukraina (Note: Previously named Admiral Flota Lobov)	11,490	(Soviet Union) 61 Kommunara Shipbuilding Plant	1983	2017 ordered to be demilitarized, unfinished 75% (2015)
Krivak III		Frigates	U131 Hetman Vyshnevetskyi (Note: Previously named Krasny Vympel)	3,642	(Soviet Union) / (Ukraine) Zaliv Shipbuilding yard	1992	Cancelled in 1995, sold to Russia and then North Korea
Krivak III		Frigates	Head no. 210	3,642	(Soviet Union) / (Ukraine) Zaliv Shipbuilding yard	—	Scrapped incomplete in 1995
Grisha V		Anti-submarine ships	Lviv	1,030	(Soviet Union) / (Ukraine) Leninska Kuznya	1992	Cancelled in 1993
Grisha V		Anti-submarine ships	Zaporizka Sich	1,030	(Soviet Union) / (Ukraine) Leninska Kuznya	—	Cancelled in 1993
Auxiliary vessel
Command and SAR/medevac (1 unlisted)
Gindukush (project 05430)		Rescue	Ayu-Dag	7,000	(Soviet Union) Mykolaiv	1989	Scrapped in 1996

== Miscellaneous ==
Class	Photo	Type	Ships	Displacement	Origin	Commissioned	Fate
Auxiliary vessels
Fire rescue (1 missing)
(project 424)		Firefighting	PZhK-1819	56.4	(Soviet Union) Aral Shipyard	1987	Possibly unlisted at some point between 1997 and 2017 (inclusive); no information about ship's removal from the navy and unclear whether this occurred
Special purpose boats and barges (9 missing)
(project 454)		Small target barge	MKSch-46		(Soviet Union) 7th Shipyard, Tallinn	1978	Returned to the Russian Navy at some point between 1997 and 2017 (inclusive); no information about ship's removal from the navy
(project 436B)		Target barge	Target shield no. 26	142	Soviet Union	1991	Returned to the Russian Navy at some point between 1997 and 2017 (inclusive); no information about ship's removal from the navy
(project 411)		Artillery barge	BAMT-70250 (Note: project 411DT)	429	Soviet Union	1954	Unlisted at some point between 1997 and 2017 (inclusive); ships removed from the navy, but no information about this
(project 411)		Dry cargo barge	MBSN-405250 (Note: project 411bis)	440	Soviet Union	1952	Unlisted at some point between 1997 and 2017 (inclusive); ships removed from the navy, but no information about this
(project 106)		Dry cargo barge	MBSS-233200	534	Soviet Union	1965	Unlisted at some point between 1997 and 2017 (inclusive); ship removed from the navy, but no information about this
BSN-351900		Dry cargo barge	BSN-351900			1989	Unlisted at some point between 1997 and 2017 (inclusive); ship removed from the navy, but no information about this
BNN-90970		Dry cargo barge	BNN-90970			1941	Unlisted at some point between 1997 and 2017 (inclusive); ship removed from the navy, but no information about this
(project 1515)		Oil and garbage collector	MUS-595	39.12	(Soviet Union) Azov Shipyard	1977	Unlisted at some point between 1997 and 2017 (inclusive); ship removed from the navy, but no information about this
Babochka (project 1141)		Floating dock (Note: Designed as a small anti-submarine ship)	SPD-203	465		1960	Unlisted at some point between 1997 and 2017 (inclusive); ship removed from the navy, but no information about this

== List of ship classes ==
Notes: (Note: Excluding those for which all lost vessels were returned to Ukraine and are still in service with its Navy or one of the other branches of the state mentioned in the note under Decommissioned and sold ships) (Note: Also excluding the unfinished Sovremenny-class destroyer used as a floating storage barge)

- Submarine
  - Foxtrot-class submarine
  - Triton-2-class midget submarine
- Frigates
  - Krivak-class frigate
  - (Petya-class frigate) (Note: SKR-112 carried Ukrainian flag; scrapped before commissioned with the Ukrainian Navy)
- Corvettes (Note: Excluding the T43-class minesweeper converted to a gun-ship and the Babochka-class small anti-submarine ship converted to a floating dock)
  - Tarantul-class corvette
  - Grisha-class corvette
  - Pauk-class corvette
- Fast attack craft (Note: Excluding the Shelon-class torpedo retriever converted to a gunboat)
  - Matka-class missile boat
- Patrol (Note: Excluding the Sorum-class tugboat converted to a patrol vessel)
  - Island-class patrol boat
  - Gyurza-M-class patrol boat
  - Zhuk-class patrol boat
  - Flamingo-class anti-sabotage craft
- Landing craft
  - Ropucha-class landing ship tank
  - Alligator-class landing ship
  - Zubr-class LCAC
  - project 1785-class small landing craft
  - Centaur-LK-class fast assault craft
- Mine warfare
  - Sonya-class minesweeper
  - Natya-class minesweeper
  - Yevgenya-class minesweeper
  - T43-class minesweeper
- Auxiliary vessels (Note: Only notable classes or classes containing notable vessels)
  - Boris Chilikin-class fleet oiler
  - Amur-class command/search and rescue ship
  - Bambuk-class command ship
  - Sorum-class tugboat
