= Slavutych (disambiguation) =

Slavutych or Slavutich (Cyrillic: Славутич) means son of Slavuta. Slavuta is an archaic name for the Dnieper river. Nowadays it may refer to the following:

- Slavutych, a town in the Kyiv Oblast of Ukraine
- Slavutych (Kyiv Metro), a station of the Kyiv Metro
- Ukrainian command ship Slavutych, formerly of the Ukrainian Navy
- Slavutych (beer), a brand of Ukrainian beer
- Slavutych Brewery, Kyiv, Ukraine
- Slavutych-Arena, a football (soccer) stadium in Zaporizhzhya
- FC Slavutych, Slavutych, Kyiv, Ukraine; a soccer team
- Ukrainian command ship Slavutych
