= Zhdanov Shipyard =

Zhdanov Shipyard may refer to:

- Severnaya Verf, formerly Zhdanov shipyard, in Saint Petersburg, Russia
- Azov ship-repair factory, in Mariupol (formerly Zhdanov), Ukraine
