= Ukrainian reconnaissance ship Simferopol =

Ukrainian naval vessel

Coordinates: 45°25′03″N 29°30′32″E

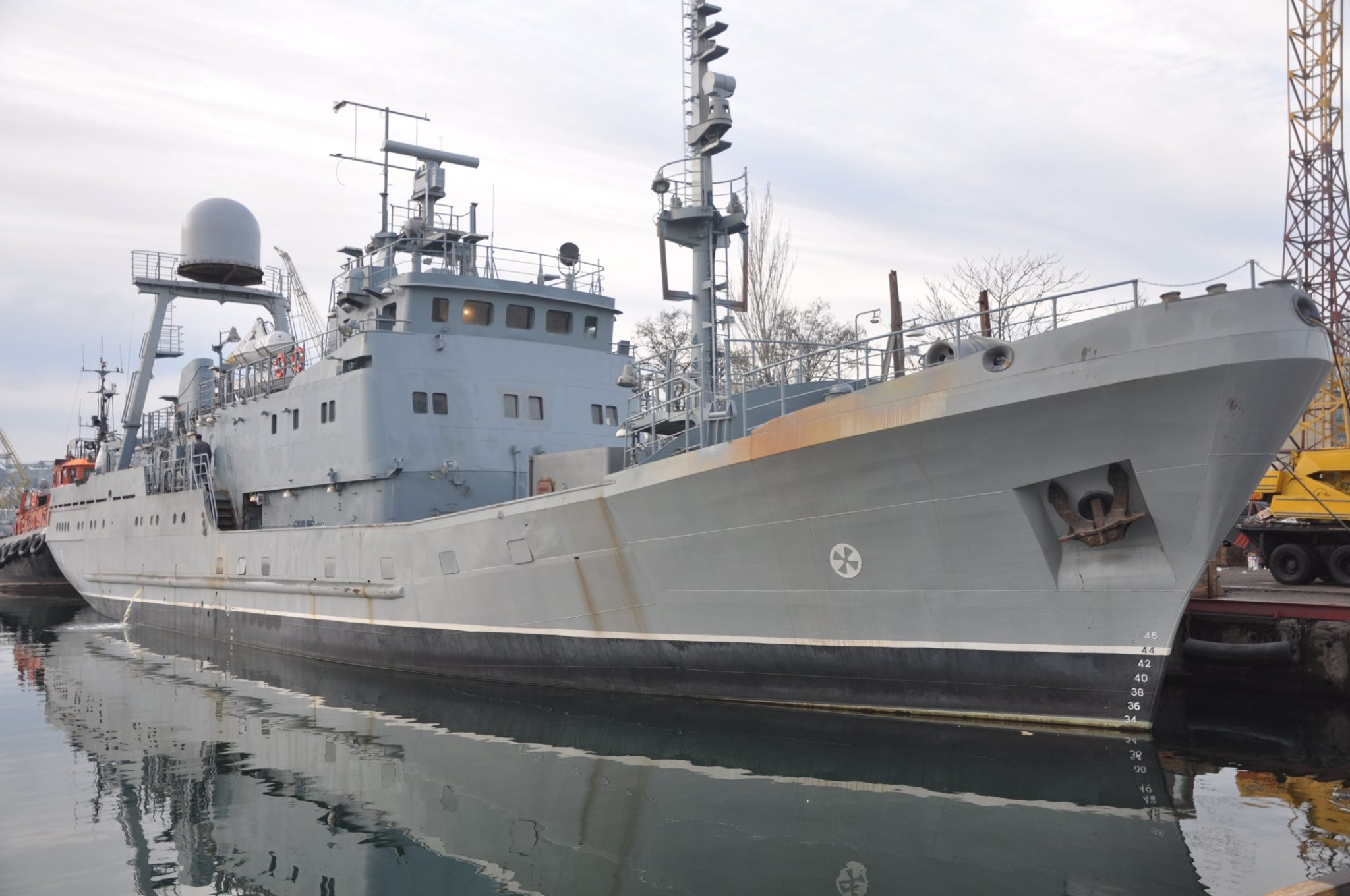
- Simferopol at launch

History

Ukraine
- Name: Simferopol
- Namesake: U543 Simferopol
- Owner: Ukraine
- Operator: Ukrainian Navy
- Ordered: 2017
- Builder: Kuznya na Rybalskomu
- Launched: 23 April 2019
- Fate: Sunk after a Russian naval drone strike in the delta of the Danube River on 28 August 2025

General characteristics
- Displacement: 1,220 long tons (1,240 t) standard; 3,510 long tons (3,566 t) full load
- Length: 54.8 m (179 ft 9 in)
- Beam: 9.8 m (32 ft 2 in)
- Draught: 4.7 m (15 ft 5 in)
- Installed power: 1 auxiliary diesel generator 853kWt
- Speed: 11.6 knots (21.5 km/h; 13.3 mph)
- Range: 7,200 nmi (13,300 km; 8,300 mi) at 14 kn (26 km/h; 16 mph); 900 nmi (1,700 km; 1,000 mi) at 30 kn (56 km/h; 35 mph)
- Boats & landing craft carried: At least one rigid lifeboat
- Crew: 29
- Armament: АК-306 artillery system

Simferopol (Ukrainian: Сімферополь) was a medium reconnaissance ship of the Ukrainian Navy that was originally built at the Kuznia na Rybalskomu (previously Leninska Kuznya) shipbuilding plant. The reconnaissance ship, built under the project Laguna, used the hull of the Project 502EM trawler.

== Development and design ==
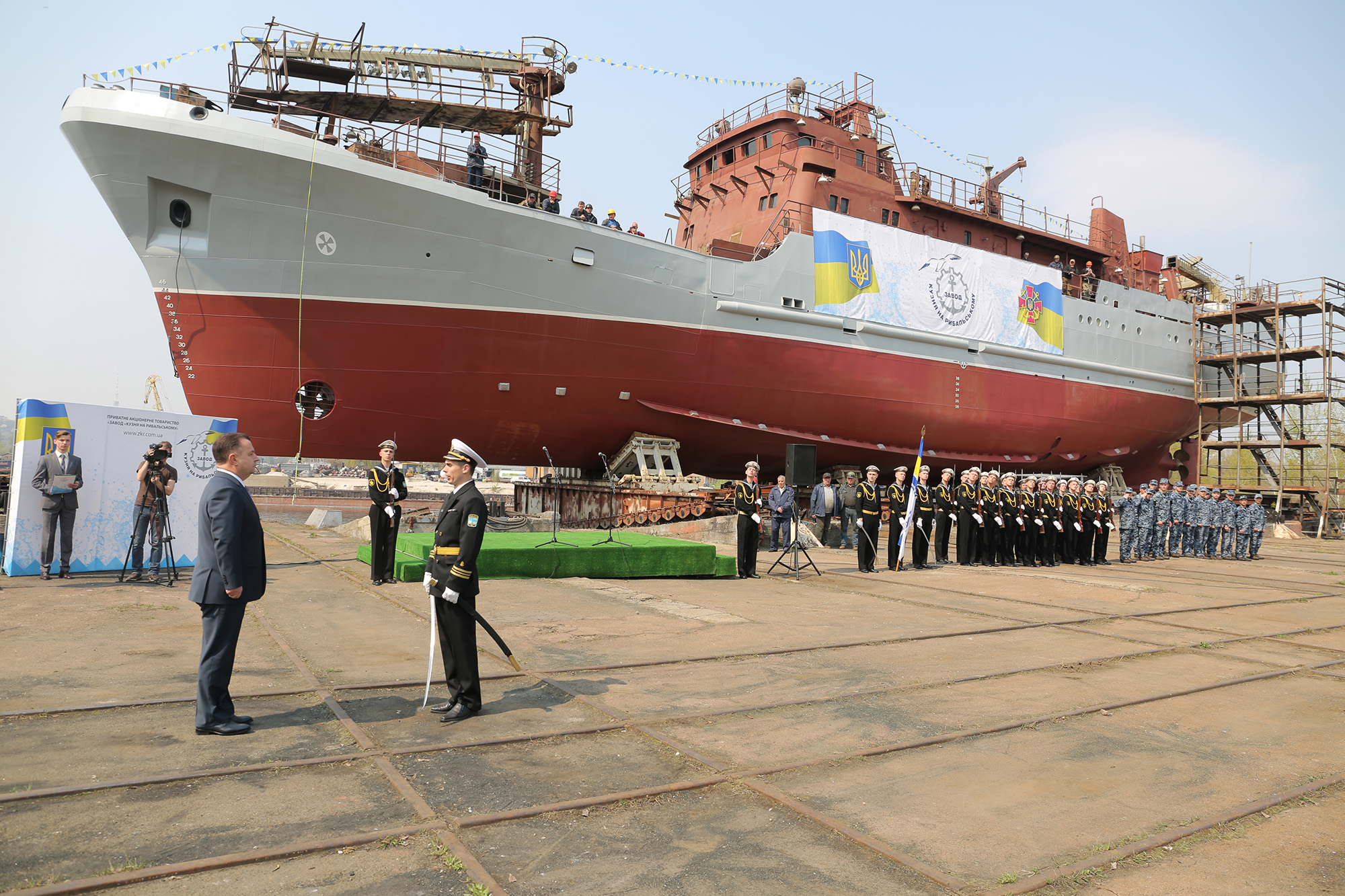
Simferopol during launch in Kyiv

The Deputy Commander of the Naval Forces of Ukraine announced the construction of a new ship for the Ukrainian Navy during an interview for one of the Odesa TV channels in March 2017. The Ukrainian shipbuilder PSC Kuznia na Rybalskomu was specified as the lead manufacturer. It was built using an unfinished hull of the Project 502EM trawler.

Kuznia na Rybalskomu launched the new medium reconnaissance ship on 23 April 2019.

In October 2019, the ship was loaded into a floating dock and delivered by inland waterways from Kyiv to Odesa. Since January 2020, it had been undergoing factory tests in the Black Sea near Odesa.

In December 2020, it was named "Simferopol" - in honor of the training ship U543 Simferopol captured by Russia in 2014. The National Industrial Portal UProm.info stated:

The decision to give the new reconnaissance ship such a name expresses the connection between generations of ships of this class in the Ukrainian Navy, serves to support and symbolize Crimea's affiliation with Ukraine, and is a sign of support for the captain of the Simferopol project 861, who is oppressed by Crimean occupation authorities.

In particular, various antennas were installed during the works, namely the Melchior radio intelligence station and other systems.

== Sinking ==
On 28 August 2025, the Russian defence ministry stated that Simferopol was sunk after a naval drone strike in the delta of the Danube River, with the Ukrainian navy stating that the attack killed two crew members and left several others injured or missing.

== See also ==
- Ukrainian command ship Slavutych
- Raid on Suda Bay
