= 9th Naval Surface Ships Division =

9th Surface Ships Division
- 9-й дивізіон надводних кораблів
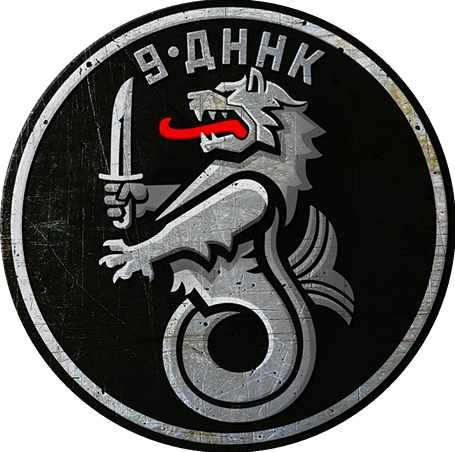
- Division Insignia
- Active: 2018 - present
- Country: Ukraine
- Branch: Ukrainian Navy
- Type: Division
- Role: Naval patrols, Coastal reconnaissance, anti sabotage operations, naval engagements
- Part of: Armed Forces of Ukraine
- Garrison/HQ: Berdyansk and Mariupol
- Engagements: Russo-Ukrainian War: War in Donbas; Kerch Strait incident; Russian invasion of Ukraine

Commanders
- Current commander: Maksym Vasyliovych

The 9th Surface Ships Division is a division of the Ukrainian Navy tasked with protecting and guarding the Ukrainian coast along the Sea of Azov. It was established in 2018 and has participated in multiple engagements during the Russo-Ukrainian War. Although officially active, all the ships of this unit have been either captured or sunk and the fact that entirety of Ukrainian coast along the Sea of Azov has been captured by Russia has rendered it out of operation.

== History ==
In 2018, the 9th division of Surface Ships was established for the defense of the Sea of Azov at Berdyansk and Mariupol. Berdyansk, Nikopol and Yana Kapu were originally set to be a part of this division but following the Kerch Strait incident, the plan wasn't implemented.

On September 20, 2018, two new vessels commanded to join the division (Donbass and Korets) set off on a trip from the Western Naval Base to Berdyansk. Near Sevastopol a vessel of the FSB Coast Guard began following them and was later joined by another vessel. Two other vessels of the division (the Kremenchuk and the Lubny) departed from Berdyansk as reinforcement. Soon multiple vessels of the FSB Coast Guard and Russian Navy accumulated in the area, but the division's vessels were able to safely reach their destination without combat.

During 2019, the vessel Korets, along with other vessels from the Ukrainian Navy and Ukrainian Sea Guard conducted exercises in the Sea of Azov. In November while conducting exercises with another vessel of the division, the Kremenchuk, they discovered a Russian vessel forcing them to withdraw.

On September 22, 2020, two vessels and a large amount of equipment were transferred to the division via the Melitopol highway to strengthen the security in the Sea of Azov.

In March 2022, the ship Korets was captured by Russians during the Siege of Mariupol and was moved to Novorossiysk. Also in March 2022, the ship Kremenchuk was captured by the Russians in Mariupol, and the Ackerman and Vyshhorod were captured in Berdyansk and transferred to Novorossiysk. Also in March 2022, the vessel Lubny of the division was sunk during the Siege of Mariupol.

On April 6, 2022, during the Battle of Mariupol, the brigade's ship Donbass was partially sunk but raised by Russians who then captured it.

On May 16 2022, the vessel Lubny of the division was raised by Russian forces from the ocean floor.

On February 23, 2023, brigade's former ship Donbass captured by the Russians was sunk in a Ukrainian Airstrike on Mariupol.

== Vessels ==
- Donbass (Command Ship) (Note: Captured and later sunk by Ukrainian Airstrike)
- Korets (Tugboat) (Note: Captured)
- Ackerman (Gunboat) (Note: Captured)
- Kremenchuk (Gunboat) (Note: Captured)
- Lubny (Gunboat) (Note: Sunk)
- Vyshhorod (Gunboat) (Note: Sunk)

== Commanders ==
- Nosenko Maksym Vasyliovych (2019-)

== Sources ==
- Військово-Морські Сили України (структура)
- Бердянск превращают в военно-морскую базу Украины на Азове
