= Slavutych Brewery =

Brewery in Ukraine

Slavutich
- Industry: Alcoholic and non-alcoholic beverage
- Headquarters: Kyiv, Ukraine
- Products: Beer
- Production output: Slavutych
- Owner: Carlsberg Group
- Number of employees: 3,000
- Parent: Carlsberg Group
- Website: http://www.slavutich.com/

The Slavutich Brewery (Ukrainian: Славутич) is a brewery in Ukraine, part of the Carlsberg Group. The company produces a number of brand name beers and non-alcoholic products for domestic as well as foreign markets.

== History ==
The Slavutich concern has over 3000 employees in Ukraine, mainly at Slavutich breweries in Kyiv and Zaporizhia) and at the Lvivska Brewery in Lviv. The newly built Kyiv brewery opened in 2004, the Zhaporyzia Brewery was acquired in 1996 and the Lvivska Brewery was bought in 1998.

1996 BBH starts activities in Ukraine by purchasing the JSC Slavutich Beer and Non-alcoholic Beverages company of Zaporizhiya. 1998 Slavutich (Zaporizhia) launches Slavutich as its first local brand.
1999 BBH and JSC Lvivska Brewery (Lviv, Western Ukraine) sign a contract to work together.
2000 Slavutich Beer and Non-alcoholic Beverages Enterprise appointed as exclusive licensee for production of Pepsi, Mirinda and 7Up.
2001 Slavutich starts production of Tuborg beer.
2004 New brewery opens in Kyiv.
2007 Launch of Holsten brand beer in Ukraine.
2008 Carlsberg becomes the 100% owner of the BBH Group Ukraine.
2008 Launch of the Group's first non-beer product: "Taras" brand kvass
2009 Licensed to distribute Corona Mexican beer.
2010 Launch of second non-beer product - "TopTea" brand iced tea.

== Brands ==
Slavutich is the main brand produced by Slavutich, Carlsberg Group Company. Slavutich Svitle is one of the lighter beers in the Slavutich family. Carlsberg Group brands Tuborg and Baltika lead the premium beer market. After a re-launch of the Slavutich brand in 2007, its sales increased considerably, pushing Slavutich to the number four position in the Ukrainian market by volume sold.

Brands produced by Slavutich include: "Slavutich" and "Slavutich Ice", "Lvivske", "Tuborg", "Holsten Pilsener", "Carlsberg", "Baltika", "Arsenal", "Khmilne", "Kvas Taras", "TopTea"
