= Chernomorsky =

Chernomorsky (Russian: Черноморский; masculine), Chernomorskaya (Черноморская; feminine), or Chernomorskoye (Черноморское; neuter) is the name of several places in Ukraine and inhabited localities in Russia.

Urban localities

- Chernomorsky, Seversky District, Krasnodar Krai, an urban-type settlement under the administrative jurisdiction of Chernomorsky Settlement Okrug in Seversky District of Krasnodar Krai; 44°51′N 38°29′E
- Chornomorske, an urban-type settlement in Crimea (Chernomorsky District of the Republic of Crimea) a territory occupied by Russia but internationally recognized as a part of Ukraine.

Rural localities

- Chernomorsky, Krymsky District, Krasnodar Krai, a khutor in Yuzhny Rural Okrug of Krymsky District in Krasnodar Krai; 45°0′N 38°2′E
- Chernomorsky, Saratov Oblast, a settlement in Voskresensky District of Saratov Oblast
- Chernomorskaya, a stanitsa in Chernomorsky Rural Okrug under the administrative jurisdiction of the City of Goryachy Klyuch in Krasnodar Krai; 44°42′N 39°22′E
