= Sorum-class tugboat =

1972 Russian seagoing tug

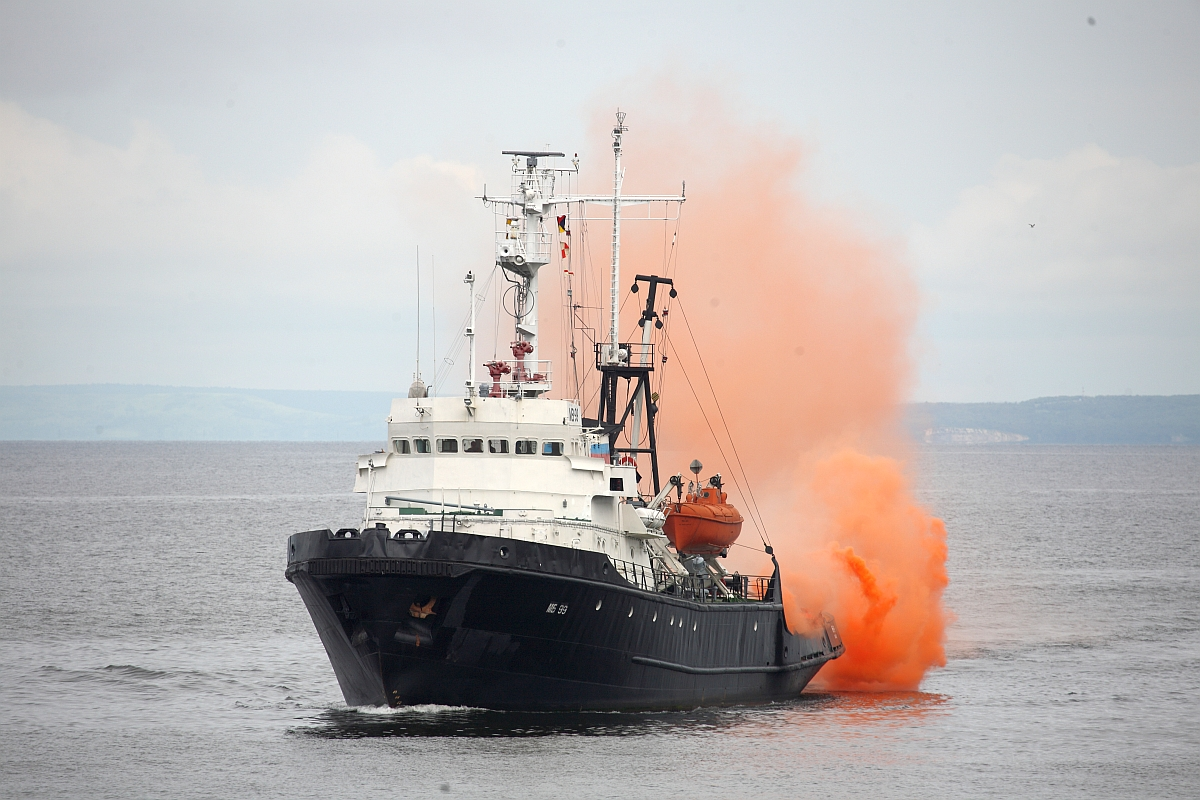
- The Russian Navy Sorum-class seagoing tug MB-99 (Project 745) during the Navy Day celebrations at Vladivostok in 2008

Class overview
- Name: Sorum class
- Builders: Yaroslavl Shipyard; Zelenodolsk Shipyard (Project 745MB)
- Operators: Soviet Navy (former); Soviet Border Troops (former); Russian Navy; Russian Coast Guard; (Russia) Rosmorport (former) (Note: One Project 745 tug—the ex–Soviet Navy seagoing tug MB-26 (1973)—that was scrapped in 2019.); Ukrainian Navy (former) (Note: One Project 745 tug—the Ukrainian Navy seagoing tug Korets, ex–Soviet Navy's MB-30 (1973)—that was captured by the Russian Armed Forces in the Port of Berdiansk during the Russian invasion of Ukraine on February 28, 2022.); Vietnam People's Navy (Note: One Project 745 tug—the ex–Soviet Navy seagoing tug MB-13 (1983)—that was acquired in 1989.)
- In commission: 1972
- Completed: c. 43

General characteristics (Project 745)
- Type: Seagoing tug
- Displacement: 1,452 t (1,429 long tons; 1,601 short tons)
- Length: 56.5 m (185 ft 4 in)
- Beam: 12.64 m (41 ft 6 in)
- Draft: 4.47 m (14 ft 8 in)
- Installed power: 2 × 1,000 kW main diesel gensets; 2 × 100 kW auxiliary diesel gensets
- Propulsion: IEP; two shafts: 2 × 1,500-metric-horsepower (1,480 hp) DC propulsion motors
- Speed: Max: 13.2 knots (24.4 km/h; 15.2 mph)
- Range: 6,200 nmi (11,500 km; 7,100 mi) at 13 kn (24 km/h; 15 mph)
- Endurance: 40 days
- Complement: 35
- Sensors & processing systems: 2 × Don navigational radars; Communication systems
- Armament: One tug since 2015: 2 × twin 12.7 mm Utyos-M machine gun turrets

The Sorum class, Soviet designation Project 745, is a series of seagoing tugs built for the Soviet Navy and the KGB Border Troops, and later operated by the Russian Navy and the FSB Border Service.

These vessels perform the standard missions of a seagoing tugboat with other missions such as protecting and patrolling Russian maritime borders, enforcing navigational rules and law enforcement, search and rescue, and fisheries protection.

== Design ==
Project 745 seagoing tug
The oceangoing tugs are auxiliary vessels for the Soviet Navy, later the Russian Navy.

Project 745P patrol ship
The border patrol ships are modified versions of the original Project 745. They are armed with two 30 mm AK-230M or AK-306 (Note: The AK-306s were mounted on the last five of nineteen ships built.) gun mounts giving them the ability to fire on surface, air and ground targets, and are equipped with the Kolonka-1 fire-control system to control these weapons.

Project 07452 experimental vessel
The reconnaissance vessel is a version of the original Project 745, which is a testbed for SIGINT and hydroacoustic equipment.

Project 745MB seagoing tug
The oceangoing tug is a modernized version of the original Project 745. It is equipped with two main diesel gensets (2 × 1,500 kW), three auxiliary diesel gensets (2 × 200 kW + 1 × 100 kW), an asynchronous propulsion motor (2,720 metric horsepower or 2,680 hp), and a bow thruster.

Project 745MBS rescue tug
The rescue tug is a SAR version of the modernized Project 745MB, which is equipped with a switched reluctance propulsion motor instead of an asynchronous one.

Project 745MB and 745MBS tugs differ externally from original Project 745 tugs by having twin funnels instead of single.

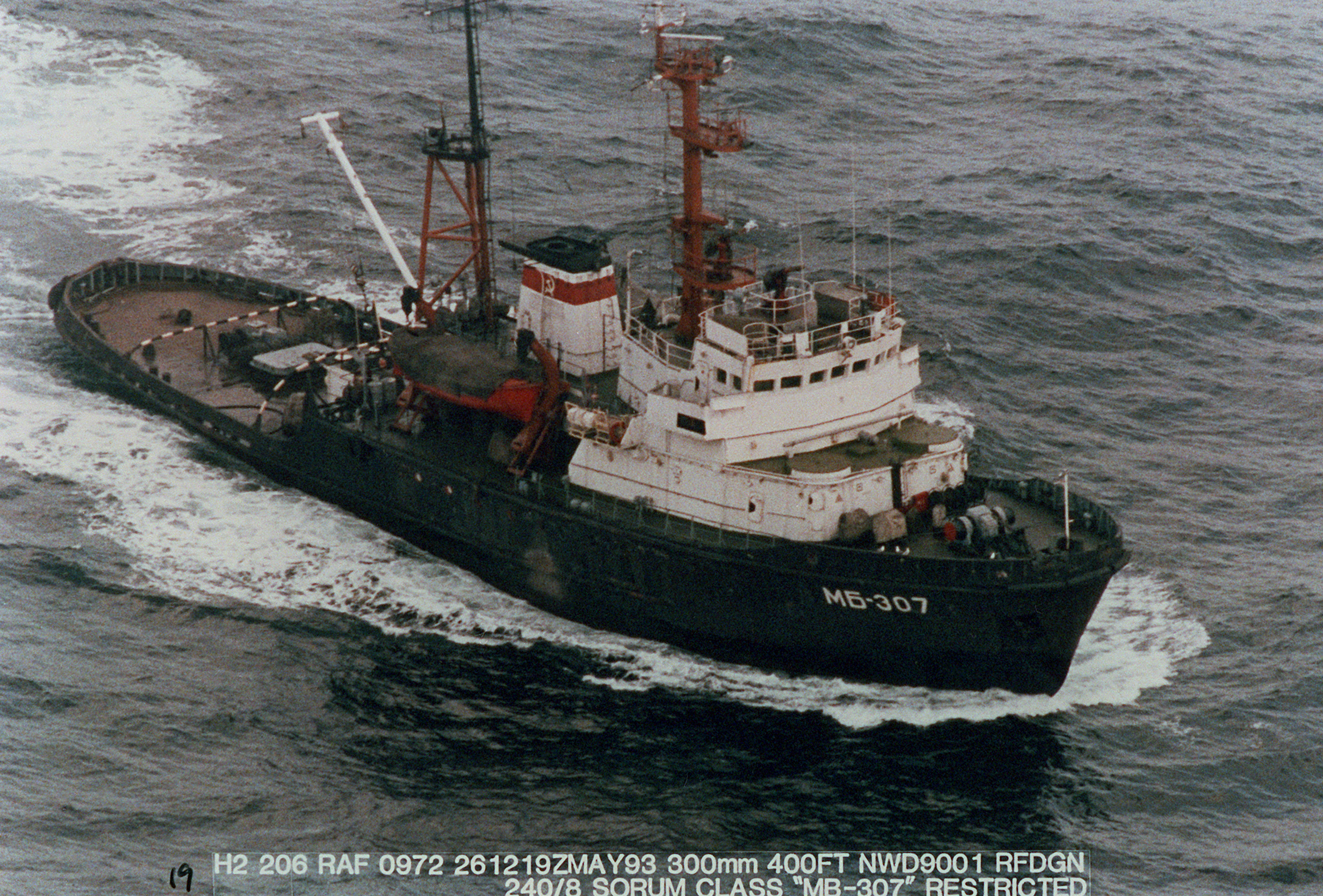
The Russian Navy Project 745 seagoing tug MB-307 in the North Atlantic Ocean in 1993

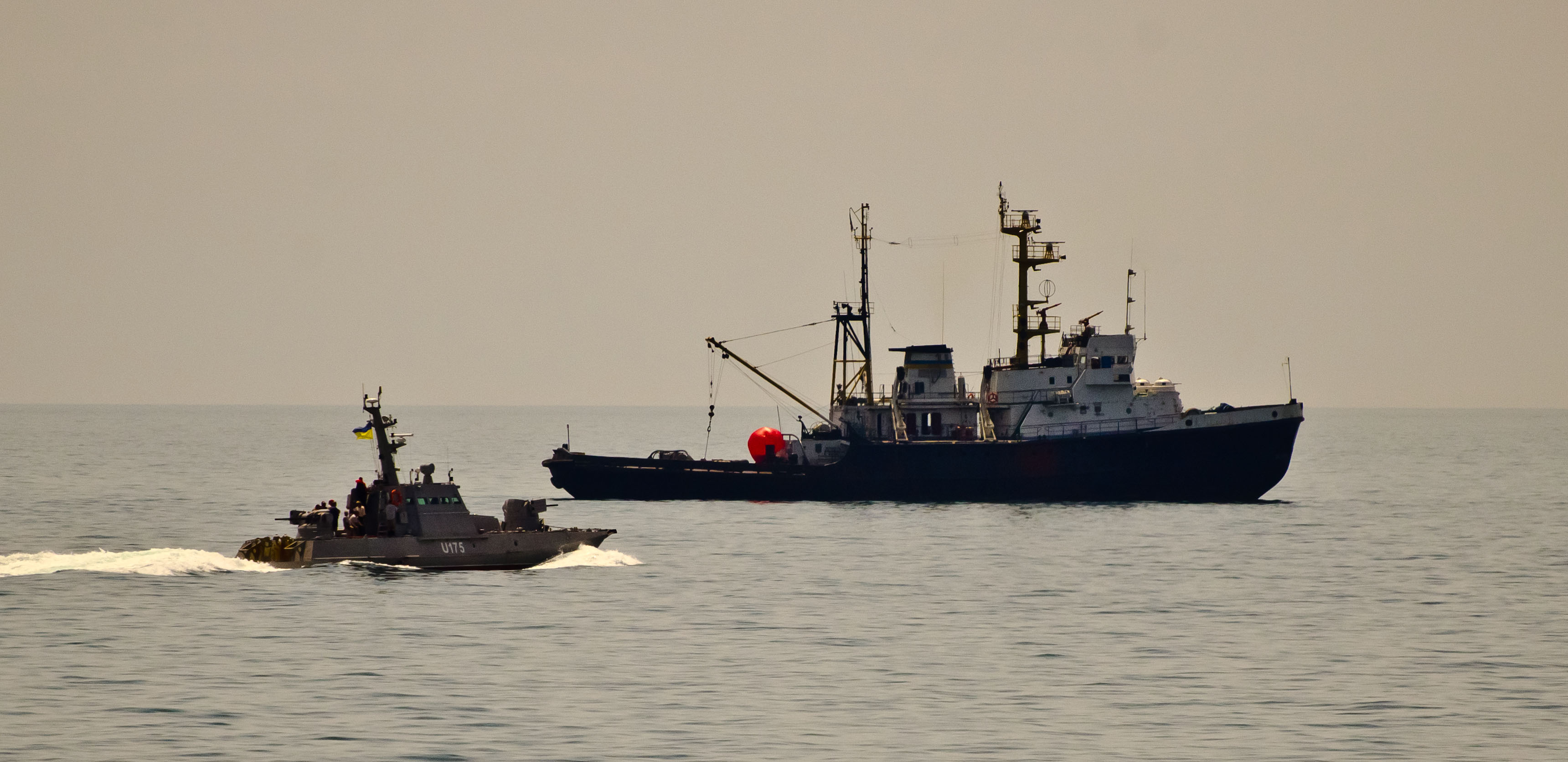
The Ukrainian Navy Project 745 seagoing tug Korets and the Gyurza-M-class gunboat Berdiansk (U175) in the Black Sea in 2016

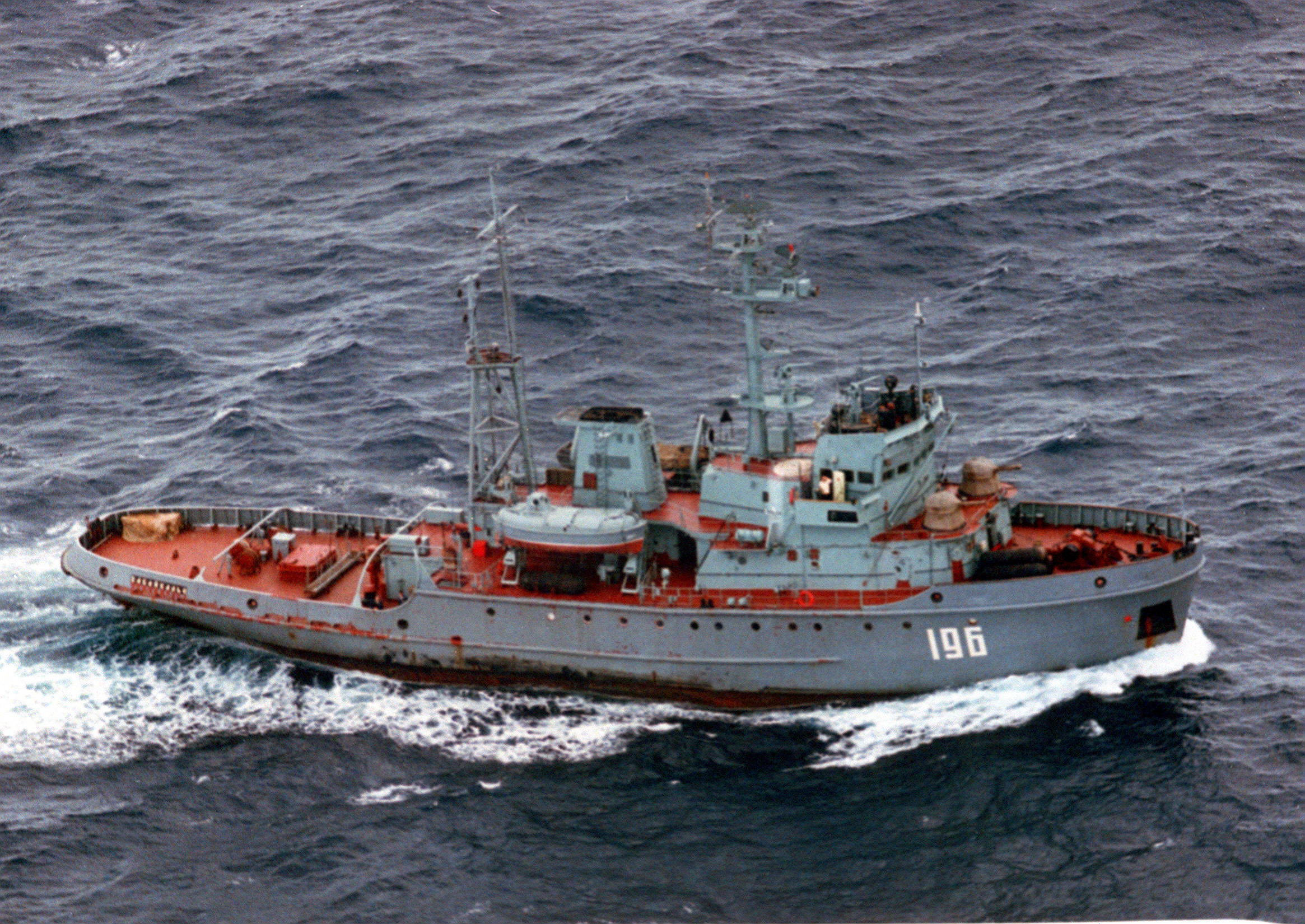
The Russian Border Troops Project 745P border patrol ship Zabaykalye in the western Pacific in 1992

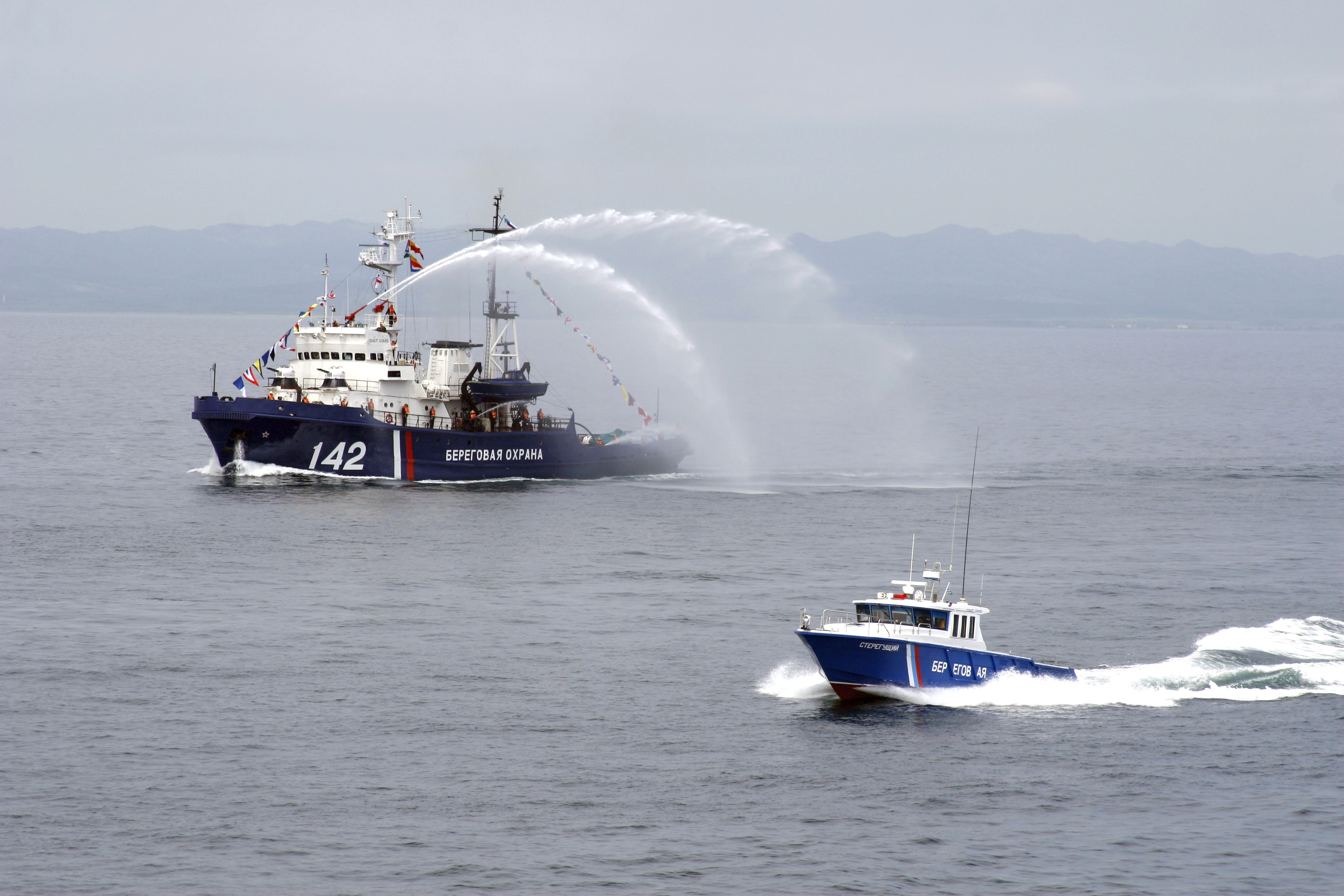
The Russian Coast Guard Project 745P border patrol ship Bug and the Yamaha S-329-class border patrol boat Steregushchiy during the Russian-Japanese exercise in Aniva Bay in 2009

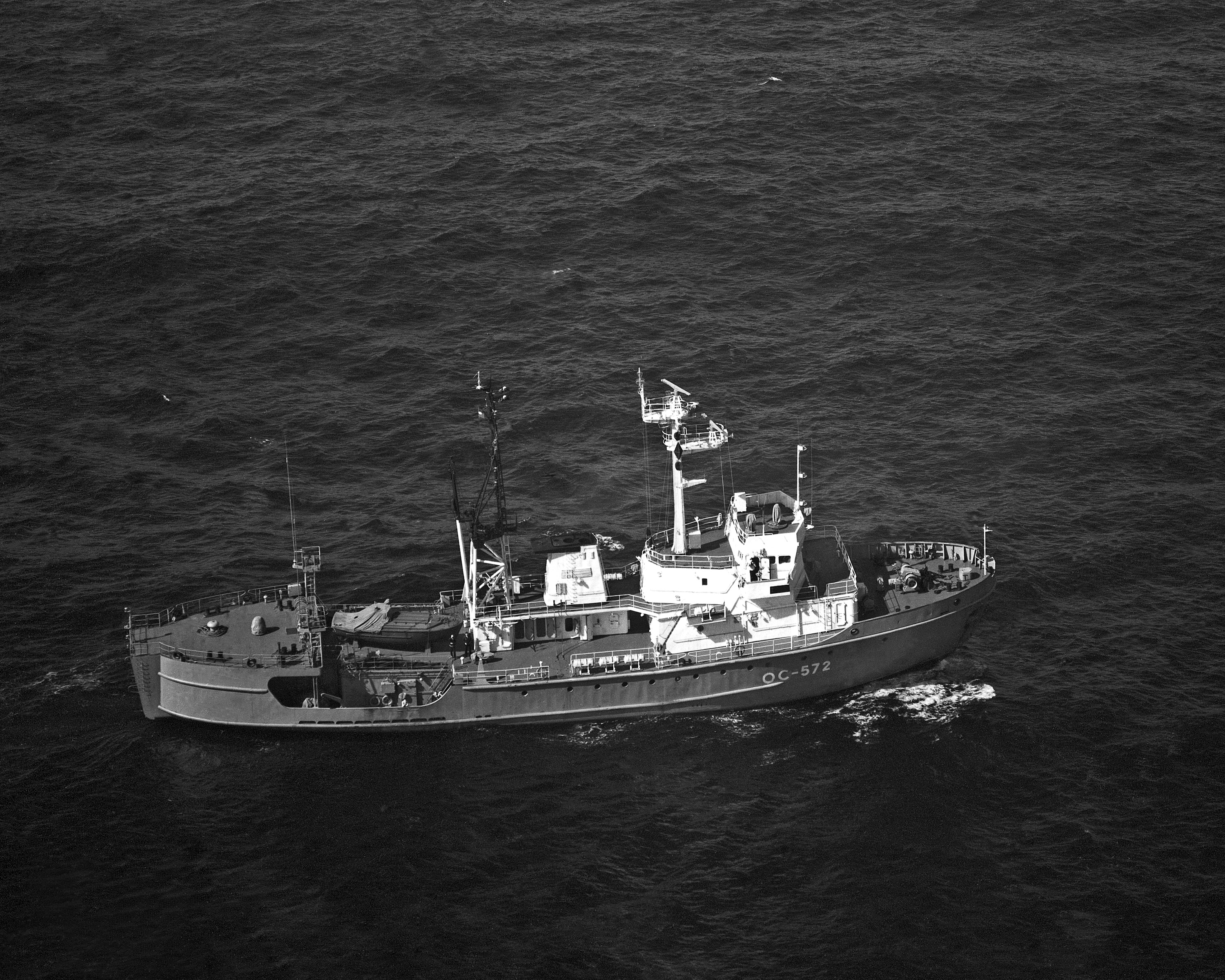
The Soviet Navy Project 07452 experimental vessel OS-572, a de facto reconnaissance vessel, between 1987 and 1991

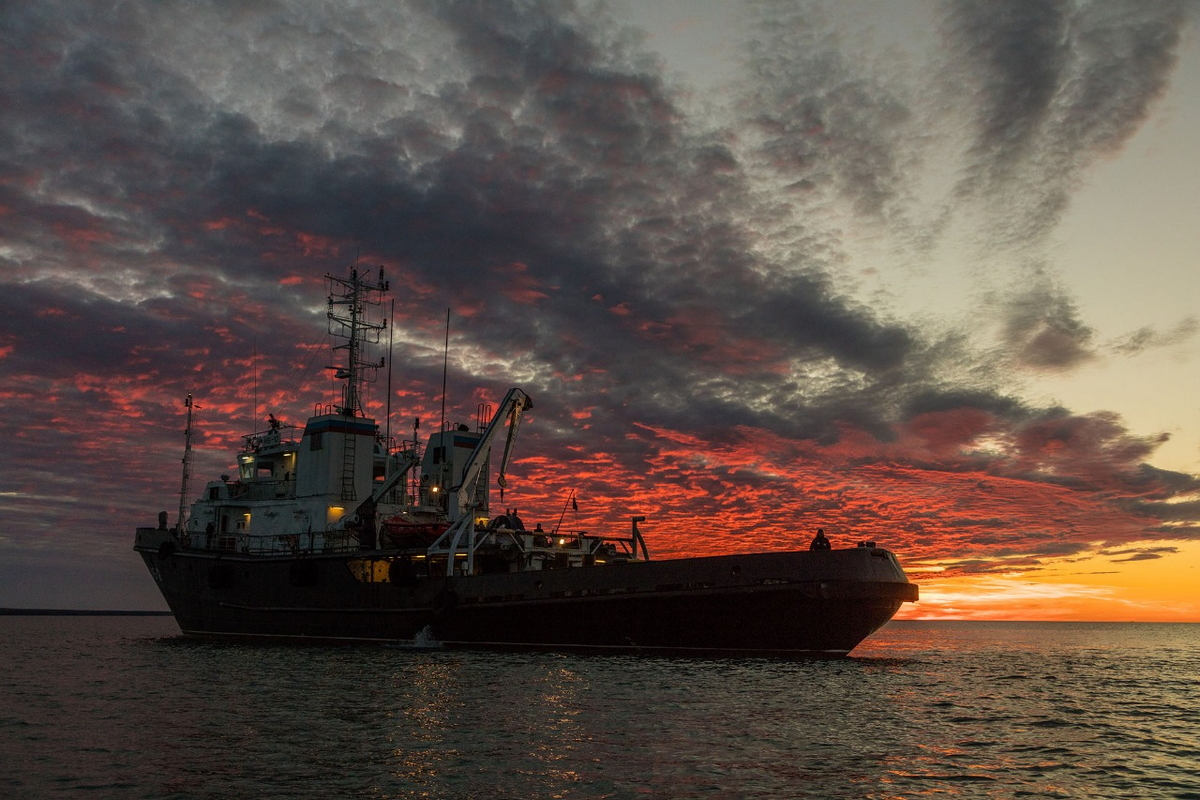
The Russian Navy Project 745MB seagoing tug MB-12 at Cape Zhelaniya in 2020

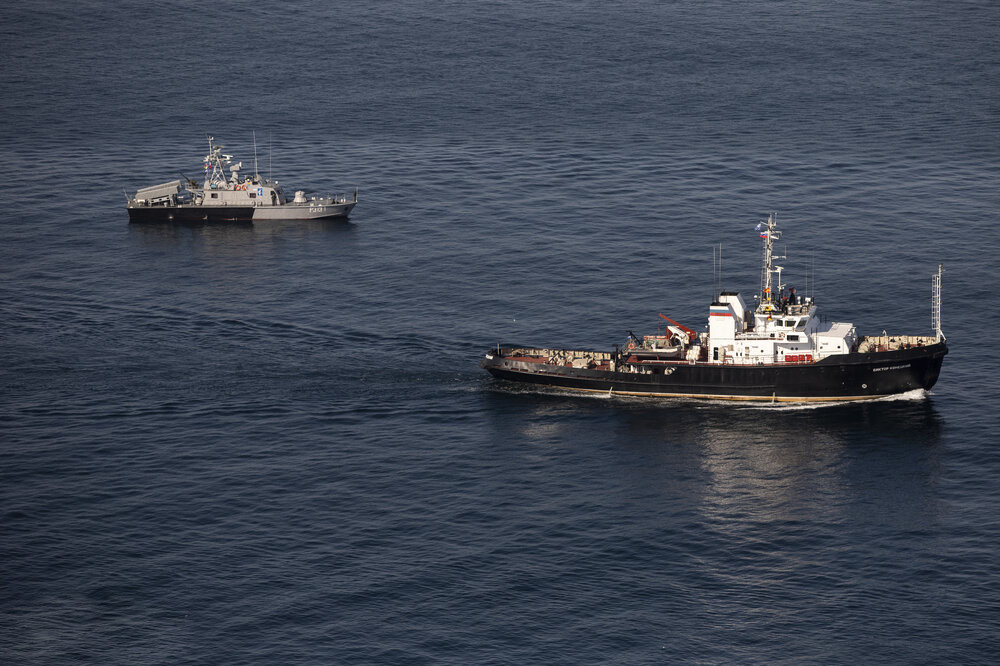
The Russian Navy Project 745MBS rescue tug Viktor Konetsky and IRIS Shahid Mahdavi (P313-1) during the CHIRU exercise in 2019

== History ==
A Project 745P border patrol ship was involved in an incident involving Greenpeace vessel where the Russian ship fired warning shots, and later seized a Greenpeace vessel after they attempted to board an oil rig in the Arctic in 2013.

Another Project 745P border patrol ship rammed a Ukrainian tug in the Kerch Strait on November 25, 2018.

== See also ==
- List of ships of Russia by project number
- List of NATO reporting names for equipment
