= Boris Chilikin-class fleet oiler =

Class of fleet replenishment oilers

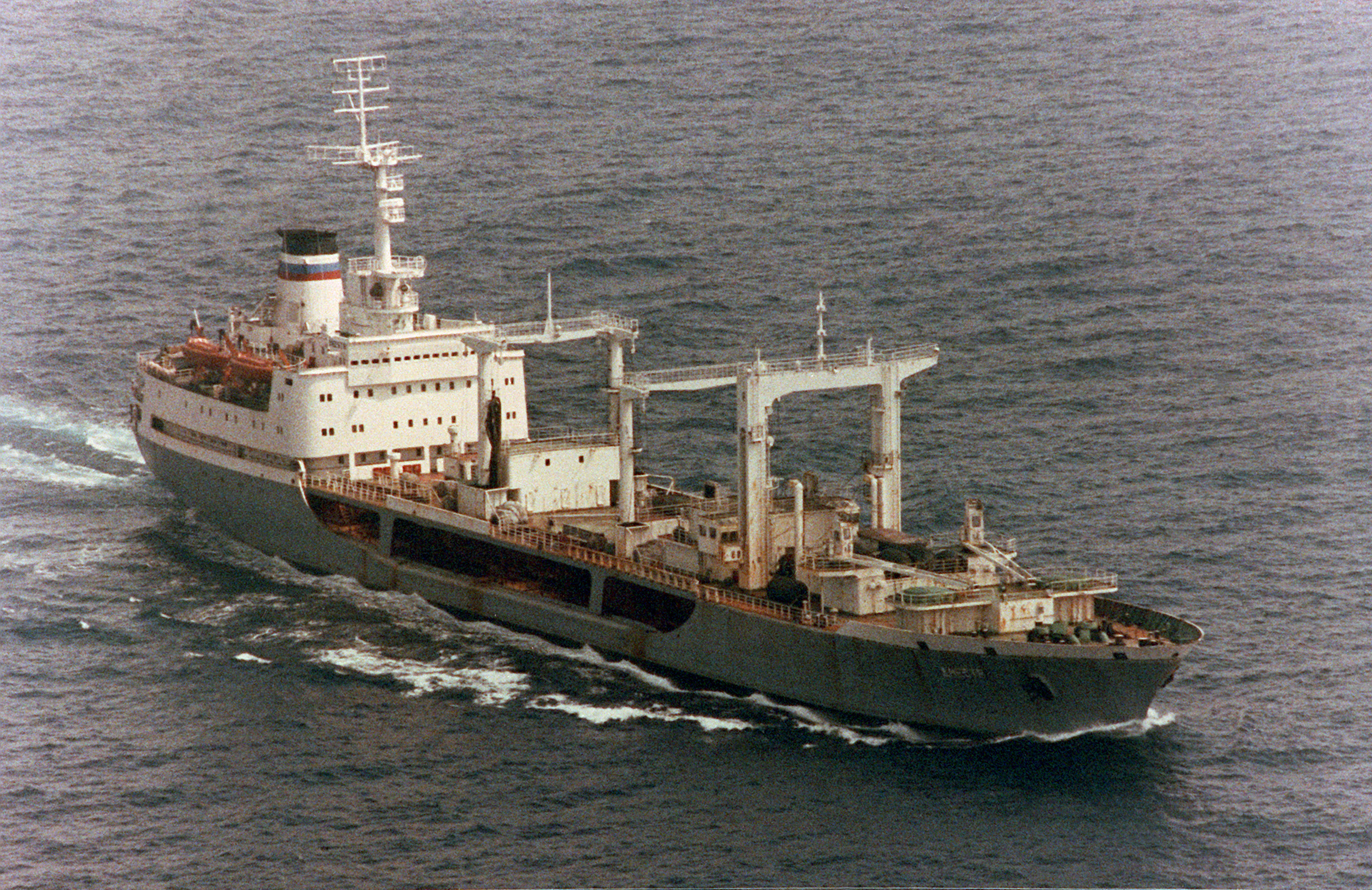
- Boris Chilikin-class replenishment oiler Dnestr underway

Class overview
- Name: Boris Chilikin class
- Builders: Baltic Shipyard, Saint Petersburg, Russia
- Operators: Soviet Navy; Russian Navy; Ukrainian Navy
- Planned: 6
- Completed: 6
- Active: 3
- Retired: 3

General characteristics
- Type: Replenishment oiler
- Displacement: 6,950 tons (standard load); 22,460 tons (full load)
- Length: 162.3 m (532 ft)
- Beam: 21.4 m (70 ft)
- Draught: 9.0 m (29.5 ft)
- Propulsion: 1 Sulzer diesel 6DNRN-74/160, 1 shaft 9,600 bhp (7,159 kW)
- Speed: 16 knots (30 km/h)
- Range: 22,000 km (12,000 nmi) at 12 knots (22 km/h; 14 mph); 19,000 km (10,000 nmi) at 16 knots (30 km/h; 18 mph)
- Endurance: 90 days
- Capacity: 13,440 tons
- Complement: 75-93
- Armament: 2 × 57 mm AK-725 guns; 2 × 30 mm AK-630 rotary cannons

The Boris Chilikin class, Soviet designation Project 1559V Morskoy prostor (Sea space), is a series of fleet replenishment oilers built in 1970s for the Soviet Navy and currently in service with the Russian Navy.

== History ==
As the Soviet Navy began to more regularly operate in large areas of the world's oceans and because of the emergence of the Kiev-class aircraft carriers, demand for large surface supply ships increased. In 1967, the TsKB "Baltsudoproyekt" (now Baltic Shipyard) received technical and tactical assignment for the design of Project 1559V sea oilers based on the civilian Project 1559 or Velikiy Oktyabr class. The main designers were S.N. Shumilov and Captain 2nd rank Yu. D. Makshanchikov.

== Construction ==
The maximum length of the ship is 162.3 m (532.5 ft), the maximum width 21.4 m (70.2 ft) and draft 9.0 m (29.5 ft). When in standard load, the ship has displacement about 6,950 tons and 22,460 tons while fully loaded. Endurance of the ships is 90 days during which they can travel the distance about 22,000 km (12,000 nmi).

The oilers of this class are equipped with a device for the transfer of goods in move by the traverse method. This allows carrying out cargo operations during significant sea waves. A wide range of transported goods (for example, bunker fuel - 8,250 tons, diesel - 2,050 tons, jet fuel - 1,000 tons, drinking water - 1,000 tons, boiler feedwater - 450 tons, lube oil - 250 tons, provisions 220 tons) allows to rank the oilers of this class to the ships for providing of complex supply.

== Armament ==
Originally, the ships were armed with two 57 mm AK-725 guns and two 30 mm AK-630 rotary cannons, but during later operations these defensive weapons were removed.

== Ships ==
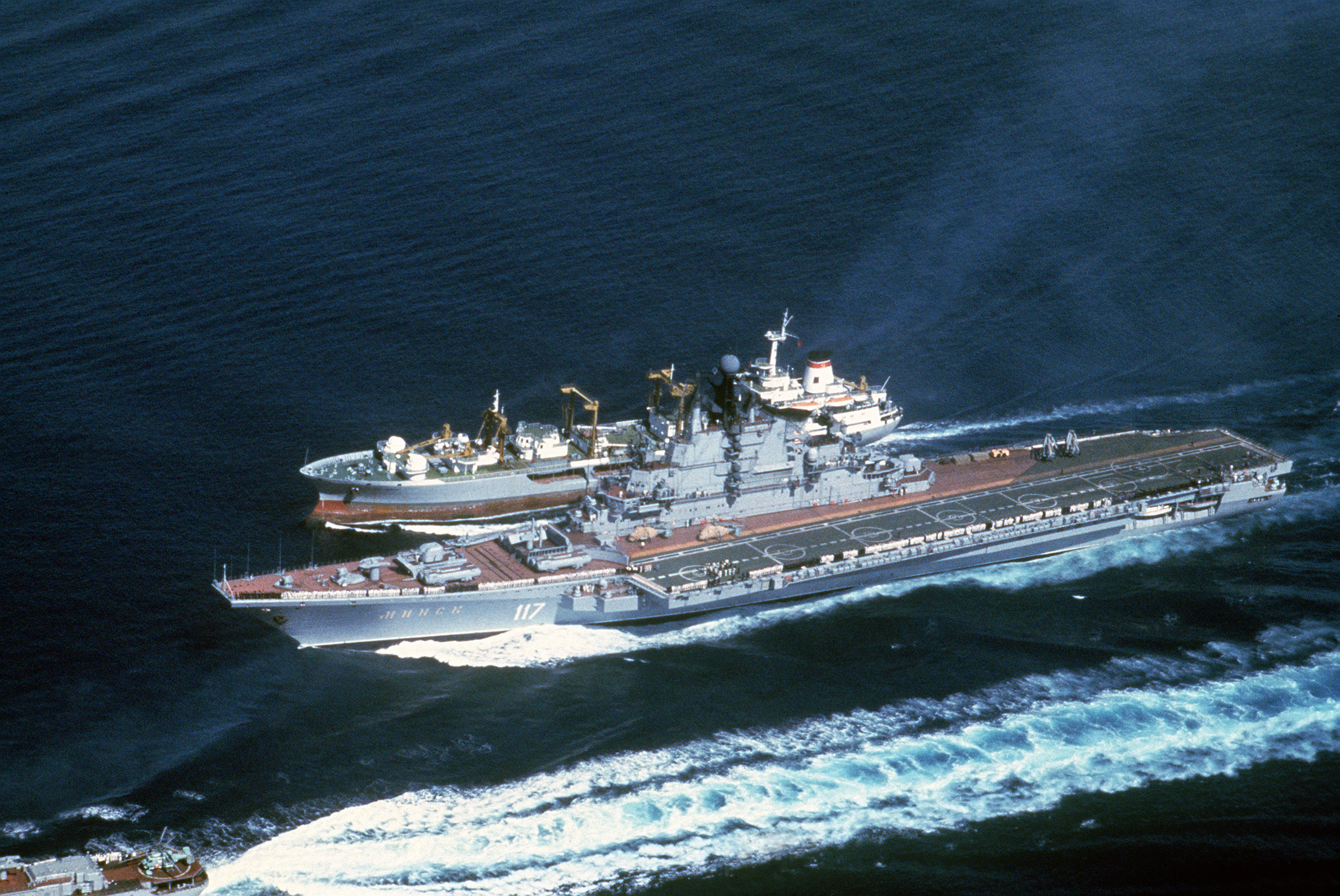
An aerial port bow view of the Soviet aircraft carrier Minsk and the Boris Chilikin-class oiler during an underway replenishment.

| Name | Builder | Laid down | Launched | Commissioned | Fleet | Status |
|---|---|---|---|---|---|---|
| Boris Chilikin | Baltic Shipyard | | | October 1970 | Black Sea Fleet | Decommissioned in 2004 |
| Vladimir Kolechitskiy | Baltic Shipyard | | | 1972 | Pacific Fleet | Decommissioned in 2012 |
| Sergey Osipov (ex-Dnestr) | Baltic Shipyard | | | 1973 | Northern Fleet | Active as of 2026 |
| Ivan Bubnov | Baltic Shipyard | | 20 April 1974 | 19 July 1975 | Black Sea Fleet | Active |
| Genrikh Gasanov | Baltic Shipyard | | | 1976 | Northern Fleet | Decommissioned in 2015 |
| Boris Butoma | Baltic Shipyard | | | 30 October 1978 | Pacific Fleet | Active as of 2025 |

Boris Chilikin was transferred to Ukrainian Navy in 1997 as Makeevka and used as commercial bulk carrier since 2001.
