= Ukrainian command ship Donbas =

1970 command ship

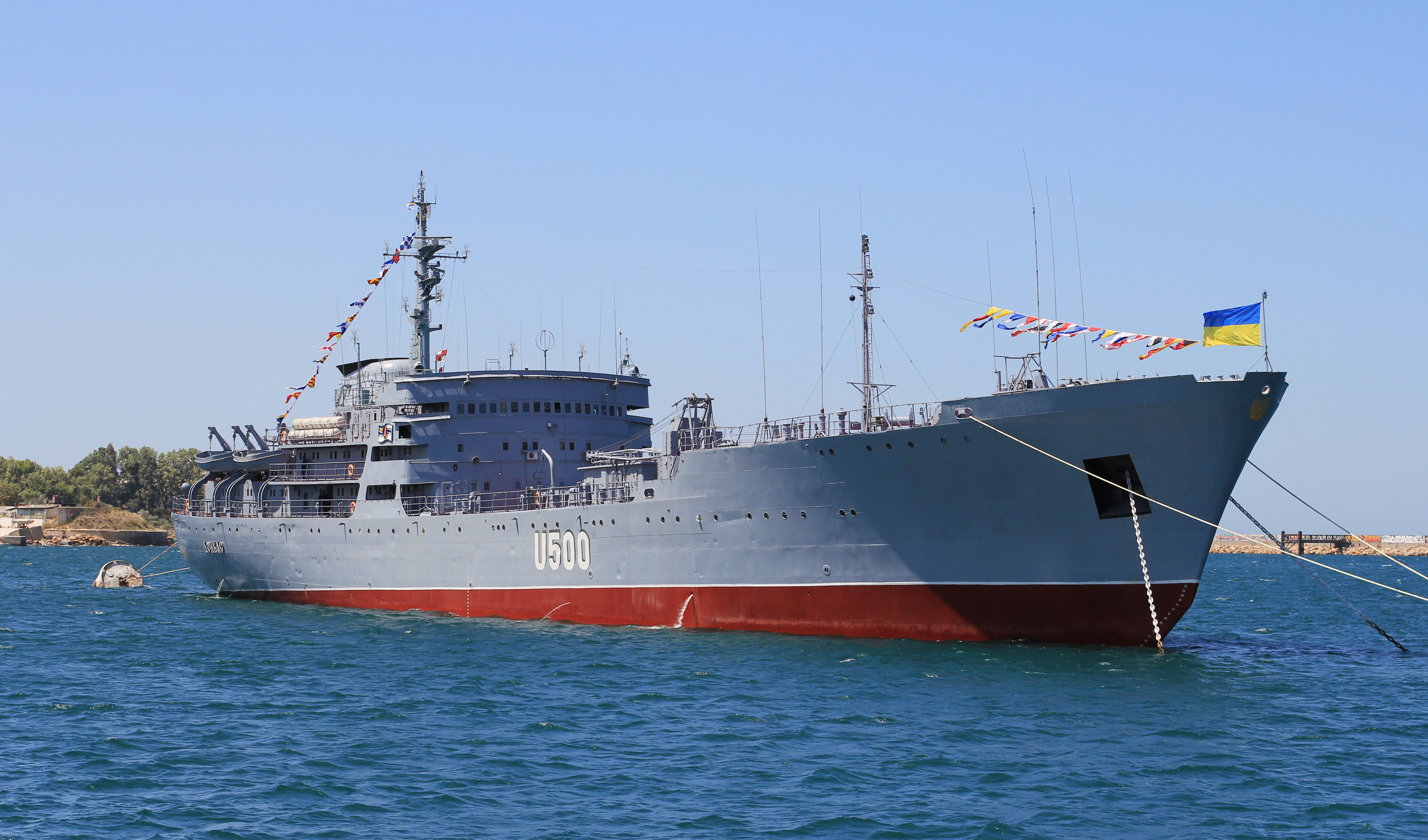
- Donbas at Sevastopol Bay in July 2012

History

Soviet Union
- Name: Krasnodon (formerly PM-9)
- Commissioned: 11 November 1969
- Decommissioned: Transferred to the Ukrainian Navy in the 1990s

Ukraine
- Name: Donbas (formerly Krasnodon)
- Commissioned: 1990s
- Fate: Sunk in April 2022 during the Siege of Mariupol
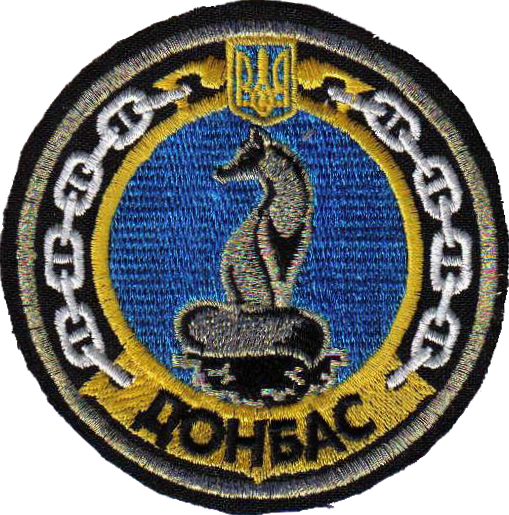
- Badge

General characteristics
- Class & type: Amur-class repair ship
- Displacement: 5,520 tons
- Length: 122 m (400 ft 3 in)
- Beam: 17 m (55 ft 9 in)
- Draft: 4.63 m (15 ft 2 in)
- Speed: 12 knots (22 km/h; 14 mph)
- Complement: 145

Donbas (Ukrainian: Донбас) was a Project 304 (NATO reporting name: Amur) former Soviet repair ship that was converted to a command ship of the Ukrainian Navy's 9th Division. She was built on Szczecin Shipyard in Poland in 1969 for the Soviet Navy and entitled PM-9. "PM" is a Russian abbreviation for a repair ship (Russian: Плавучая мастерская, Plavuchaya masterskaya), and literally means a floating repair shop. Donbas was destroyed during the Siege of Mariupol as a part of the 2022 Russian invasion of Ukraine.

== Service history ==
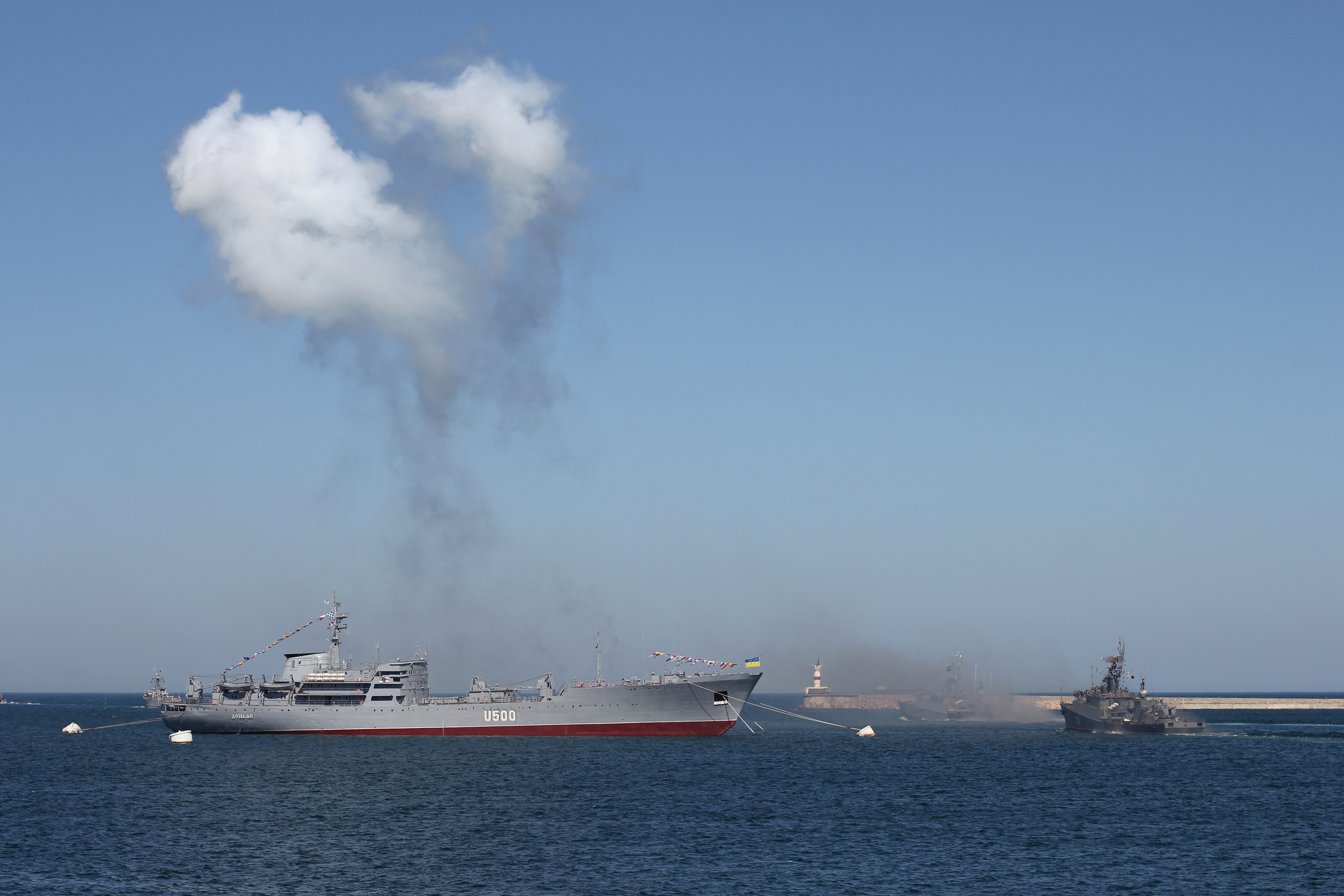
Donbas supervises a joint parade of the Ukrainian Navy and the Black Sea Fleet on Navy Day in 2012

The ships of this company were considered the most durable, they were actively applied in military campaigns since the early 1970s.

As a result of the distribution of the Black Sea Fleet, PM-9 changed her name to Krasnodon. In 2001, she was renamed the Donbas. During her service in the Ukrainian Navy, the ship has repeatedly participated in international exercises, as well as in local military parades and cruises. On 11 November 2007, the ship was caught in a hurricane near Sevastopol, but suffered minor injuries and remained intact due to the assistance of the Russian tug MB-160.

The ship Donbas marked her fourth decade of naval service on 4 December 2009. On this occasion, the Ministry of Defence of Ukraine allocated on 6 December 2010 around ₴4 million for the ship reconstruction. On 25 January 2011, she successfully passed the first stage of sea trials.

On 20 March 2014, the ship was captured by the Russian Navy during the annexation of Crimea. On 17 April 2014, she was released by Russia and transported from Sevastopol to Odesa by the Ukrainian tug Hennadiy Savelyev. On 27 September 2014, with the war in Donbas at its height, Donbas shot down a pro-Russian drone while sailing off Mariupol. On 4 September 2016, the ship was damaged by fire at Odesa.

The search and rescue vessel Donbas and the sea tug Korets got underway from Odesa on 20 September 2018 and transited the Kerch Strait on 23 September, escorted by a number of Russian Navy units. Ukrainian Navy Gyurza-M-class gunboats Kremenchuk and Lubny got underway from the port of Berdyansk to meet the two vessels as they entered the Sea of Azov. Ukrainian President Petro Poroshenko congratulated the crews of the two ships on a successful transit on his Facebook page, adding that they would become part of a newly created base in the Sea of Azov.

"The rescue ship Donbas and the tugboat Korets have arrived in Mariupol. Two small armored gunboats, the Kremenchuk and the Lubny [which were previously redeployed to the Azov Sea and set out to meet the other two ships on 23 September] arrived together with them," as stated at the Ukrainian Military Portal.

Satellite images published on 6 April 2022 show the Donbas being engulfed in heavy smoke in the port of Mariupol, indicating the ship was likely hit. On 16 April 2022, Ukrainian Defence Ministry confirmed the ship was destroyed, purportedly by artillery fire, during the Siege of Mariupol.

== See also ==
- List of active Ukrainian Navy ships
