= Ukrainian command ship Slavutych =

Ukrainian command ship

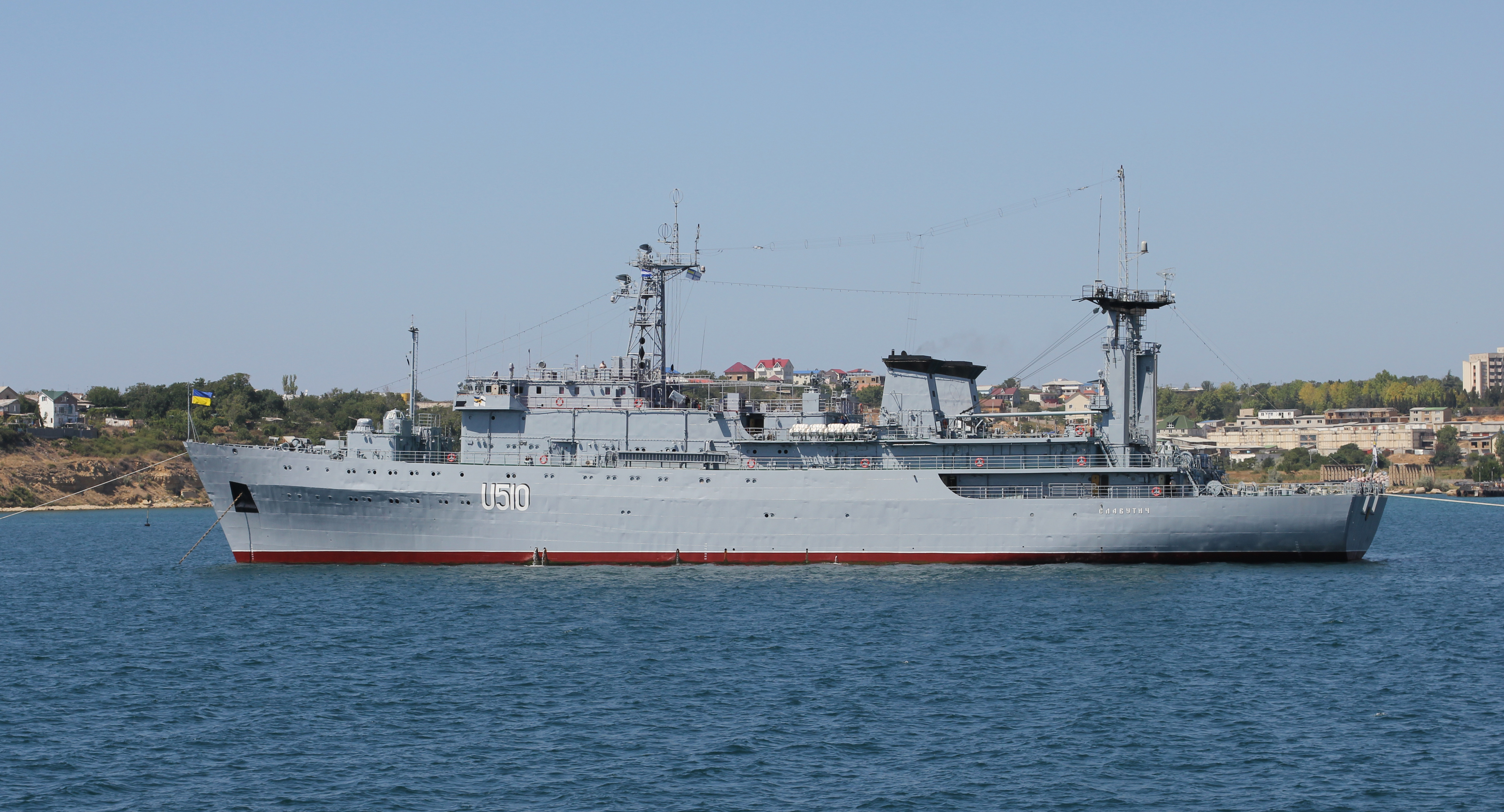
- Slavutych in Sevastopol in 2012

History

→ Soviet Union → Ukraine
- Name: Pridneprovie
- Ordered: July 1988
- Builder: Black Sea Shipyard (Mykolaiv)
- Launched: 12 October 1990
- Commissioned: 24 August 1992
- Renamed: Slavutych
- Identification: U510
- Status: Captured by Russia since 2014

Russian Federation
- Acquired: Captured during the 2014 Annexation of Crimea by the Russian Federation
- Status: undeclared

General characteristics
- Class & type: Bambuk-class spy ship
- Displacement: 5,010 tons; 5,400 full tons
- Length: 106.5 m (349 ft 5 in)
- Beam: 16 m (52 ft 6 in)
- Draft: 6 m (19 ft 8 in)
- Propulsion: 2 × Skoda 6L2511 diesels, 6,100 shp (4,500 kW); 4 × DG diesels, 630 shp (470 kW)
- Speed: 16 knots (30 km/h; 18 mph)
- Range: 8,000 nmi (15,000 km; 9,200 mi) at 12 knots (22 km/h; 14 mph)
- Complement: 178
- Sensors & processing systems: Radar: 3 x Palm Frond
- Electronic warfare & decoys: 2 x PK-16 decoy
- Armament: 1 × 4 MTU-4 (SA-N-5 'Grail') SAM missiles; 2 × 6 30 mm artillery (AK-306); 2 × 1 45 mm artillery (21-K); 2 × 2 14.5 mm AA (2M7)

The Ukrainian command ship Slavutych is a former Soviet auxiliary ship Pridneprovie of the Gofri-class intelligence ships (NATO codename: Bambuk) ship built for the Soviet Navy in the late 1980s.

== Description ==
The ship was designed by the Central Design Bureau "Chernomorets" in Sevastopol, Ukrainian SSR initially for the purpose to serve the nuclear submarines of the Soviet Northern Fleet. It was planned to realize the project based on a big refrigerated fishing trawler (BMRT) project 1288 and placed in a dock of the Black Sea Shipyard as a special ship SSV-189. Due to dissolution of the Soviet Union, the construction was abandoned and continued by the newly formed early administration of the Ukrainian Navy. It was decided to reequip the warship as a big spy ship project 1288.4 as "Prydniprovia".

=== Ukrainian service ===
On the Ukrainian independence day 24 August 1992 the former Pridneprovie was renamed Slavutych and commissioned into the Ukrainian Navy. In 1994 its identification number was switched from 800 to U510.

=== Fate ===
Slavutych was captured by Russians forces during the 2014 Russian annexation of Crimea. The ship was not returned to Ukrainian authorities.

== See also ==
- Ukrainian command ship Donbas
