= Azov Shipyard =

Shipyard in Mariupol, Ukraine

Coordinates: 47°5′45″N 37°32′58″E

- Company type: Limited liability company
- Industry: Mechanical engineering; shipbuilding; ship repair; transshipment
- Headquarters: Mariupol, Ukraine

Azov Shipyard (SRZ, LLC), formerly known as Zhdanov Shipyard, located in Mariupol, Ukraine, is the largest ship repair enterprise in the Sea of Azov, specializing in ship repair, shipbuilding, mechanical engineering, and cargo transshipment. The company is managed by Mariupol Investment Group. It is a subsidiary of SCM Holdings.

== History ==
The history of Azov Shipyard begins in 1886, when the first mechanics' workshops were built for Mariupol's port. In 1989, the shipyard got its current name. The enterprise has been managed by MC MIG, LLC, since 2010.

== Operations ==
=== Ship repair ===
Azov Shipyard has a floating dock with a lifting capacity of 15 thousand tons. The enterprise is capable of handling vessels with lengths of up to 200 meters and widths of up to 25 meters, with an approach channel allowing vessels with a draft of up to 8 meters. The enterprise performs the repair of sea and river vessels, with a capacity of up to 120 vessels annually. The yard also manufactures spare parts for all kinds of vessels.

=== Transshipment of cargo ===
SRZ, LLC provides the transshipment of oversized and heavy cargo using railroads and berth lines, its own diesel shunters, cranes, and other equipment. The enterprise has eight berths (1.24 kilometers in total length) equipped with gantry cranes with a capacity from 5 to 40 tons. The total area for cargo accumulation is over 21 thousand square meters. The depth of the water near the berths is 8 meters.

=== Shipbuilding ===
SRZ, LLC builds different types of self-propelled and non-self-propelled ships, seaport roads, oil-skimming ships, floating docks, berths, pontoons, and other elements of hull shipbuilding. More than 200 ships have been built by the enterprise since it started operating.

=== Engineering ===
The enterprise provides mechanical processing for fleet and fleet-related industries. It provides work on universal lathe, milling, vertical-turning lathe, boring, and gear-cutting machines. Casting and forging production at the yard allows production from cast iron and non-ferrous metals for vessels and equipment. Azov Shipyard produces hoisting and handling equipment and metal structures. The enterprise has gained experience in production and can supply over 120 different models of rope grabs (with a capacity of 2.5 to 35 tons) that can be used by metallurgical plants as well as sea and river ports to transship bulk cargo and scrap metal.

== Notable vessels ==
Azov is one of several shipyards that built the Ondatra-class landing craft.
