= List of Russo-Ukrainian war military equipment =

The weapons, vehicles and equipment used in the Russo-Ukrainian war, from 2014 to the present include the following. The war involves the Armed Forces of Ukraine, the Russian Armed Forces, the Korean People's Army (In Kursk only) and a number of national guard and volunteer groups from both sides.

The pro-Russian Donetsk and Luhansk People's Militias fought alongside the Russian Armed Forces until September 2022, when the separatist republics were formally annexed by Russia, and their militias incorporated into the Russian Army.

== Russian, Separatist, and North Korean forces ==
=== Individual equipment ===
==== Helmets ====
- SSh-68
- 6B47
- 6B48

==== Optics and night vision ====
- PU
- 1P8

=== Small arms ===
==== Pistols and revolvers ====
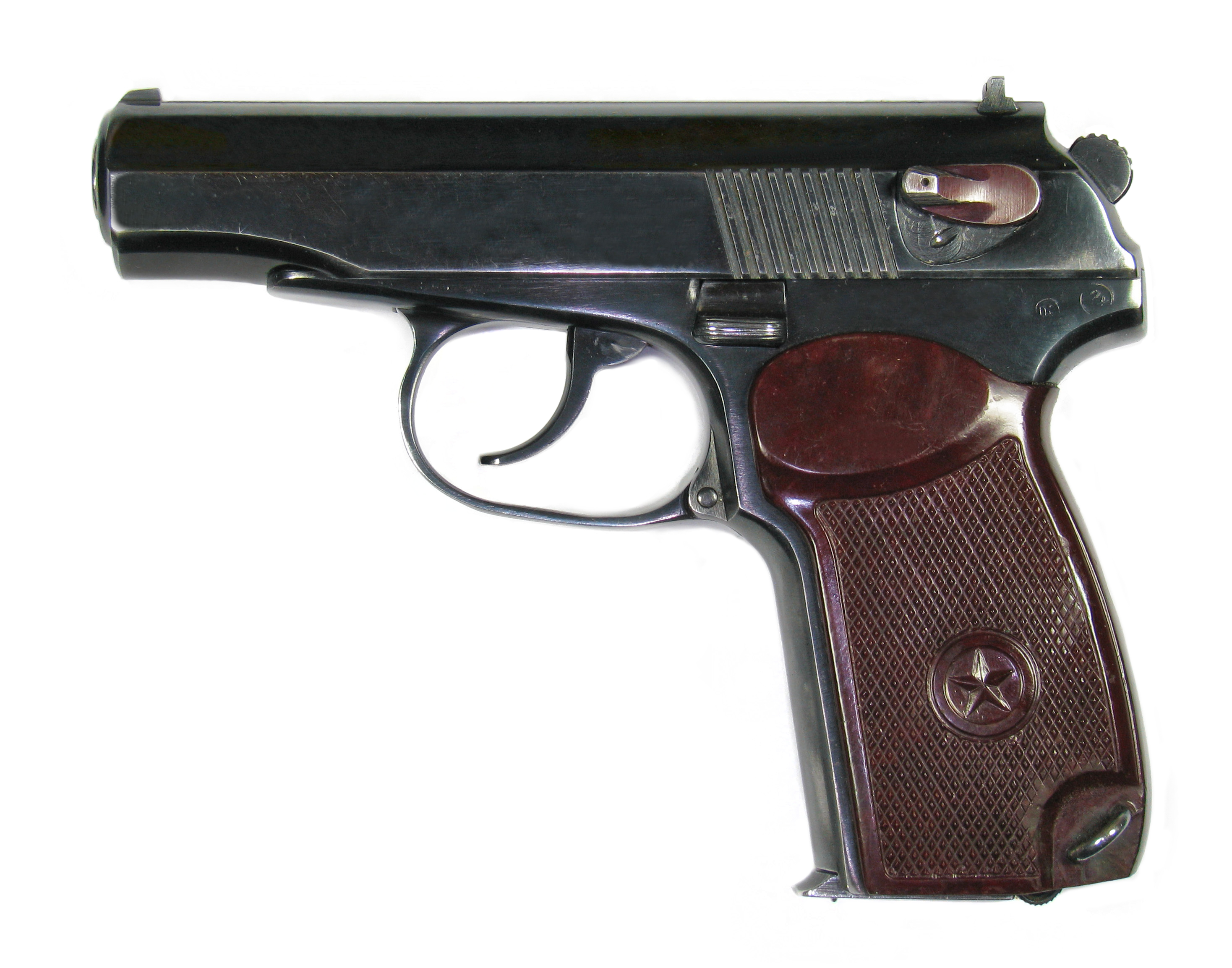
Makarov pistol. Former primary sidearm of the Soviet Army and Ukrainian Ground Forces. Most commonly used sidearm among both Russian, Ukrainian and militia forces.

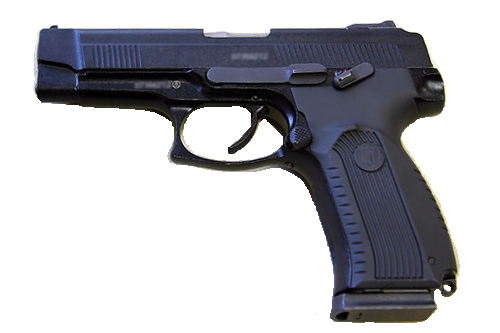
MP-443 Grach. Standard sidearm for all branches of the Russian Armed Forces.

- MP-443 Grach
- PM
- APS
- Fort-17 (captured)

==== Submachine guns ====
- PPSh-41
- PPS-43
- FB PM-63 (captured)

==== Bolt-action rifles ====
- Mosin-Nagant M1891/30

==== Semi-automatic rifles ====
- SVT-40
- SKS

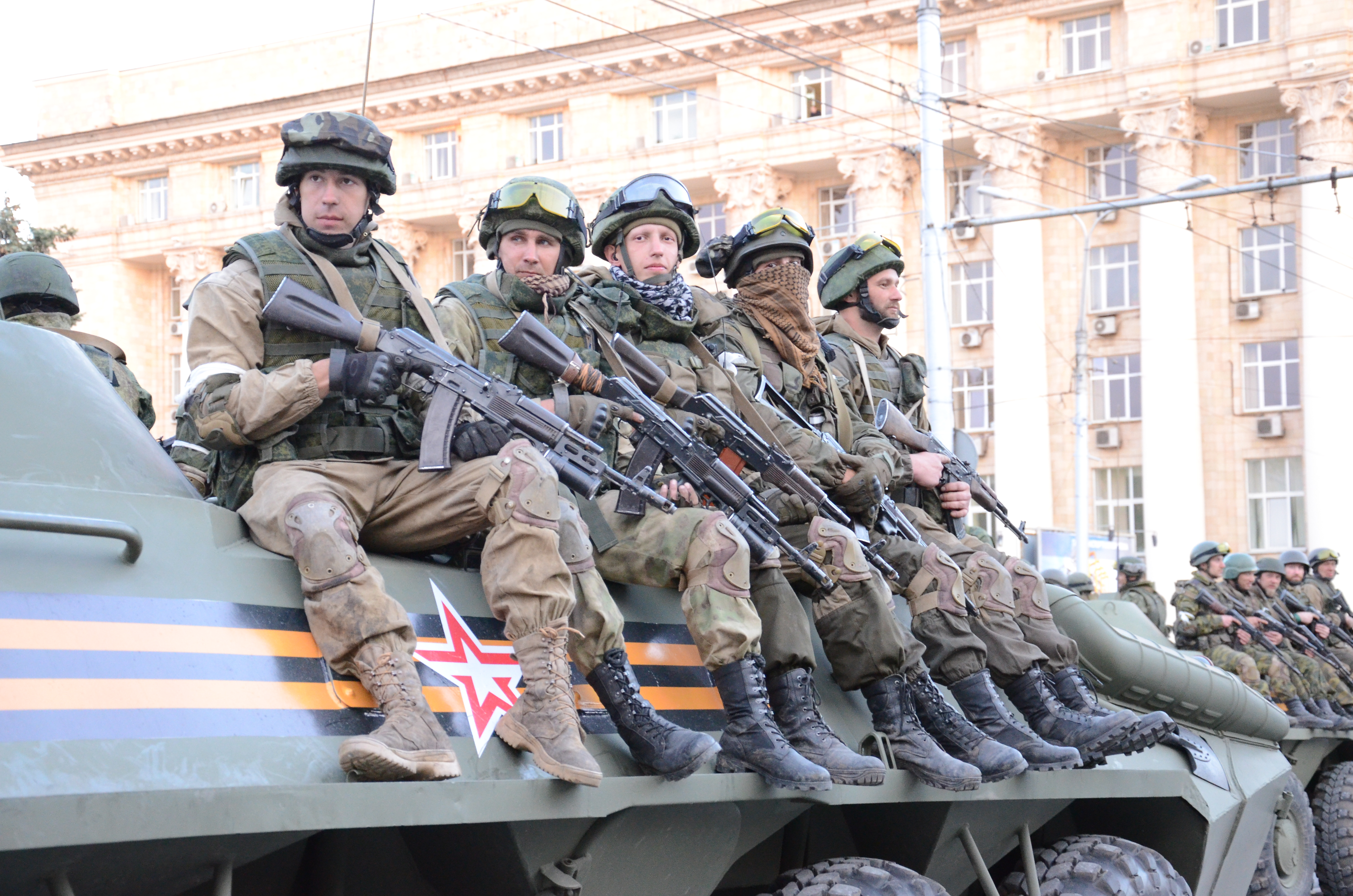
DPR soldiers with AK-74 style rifles

==== Assault rifles and carbines ====
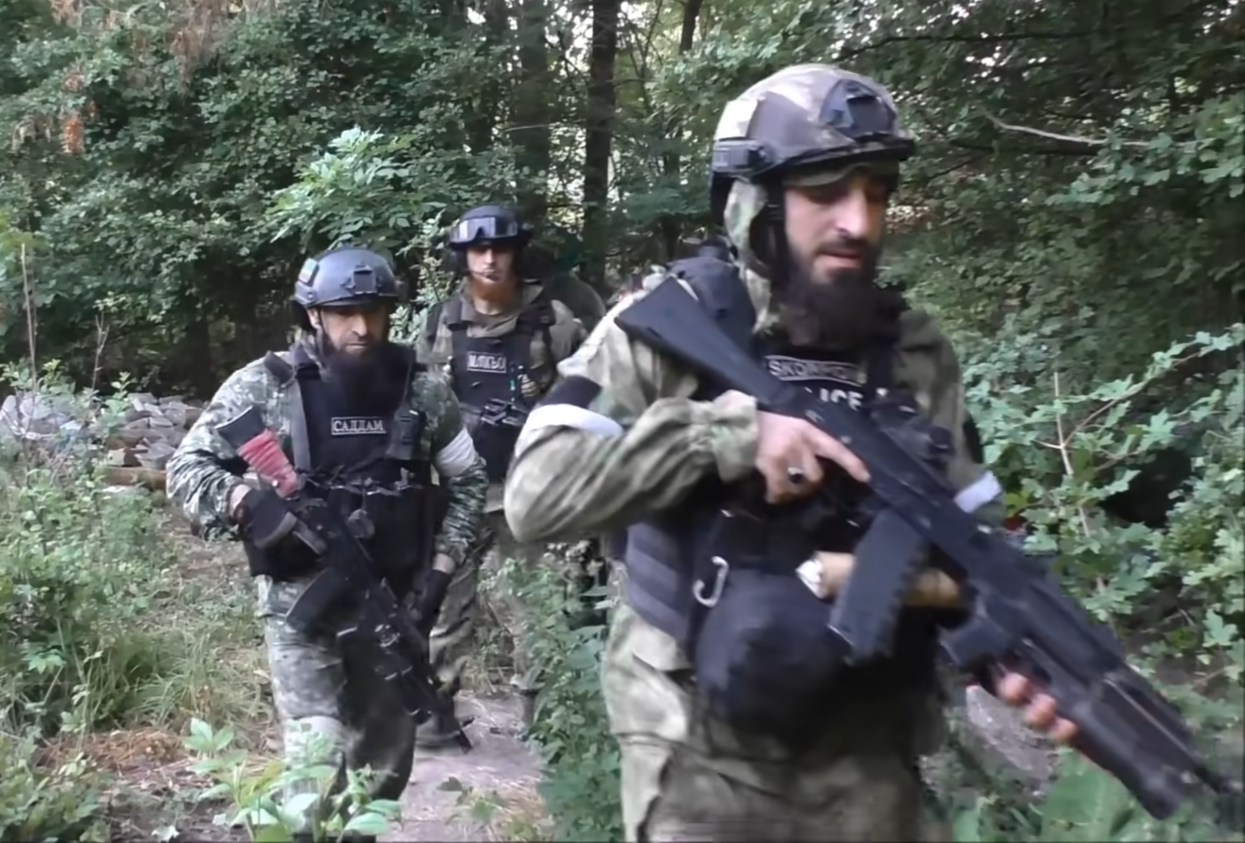
Chechen forces with AK-74 style rifles

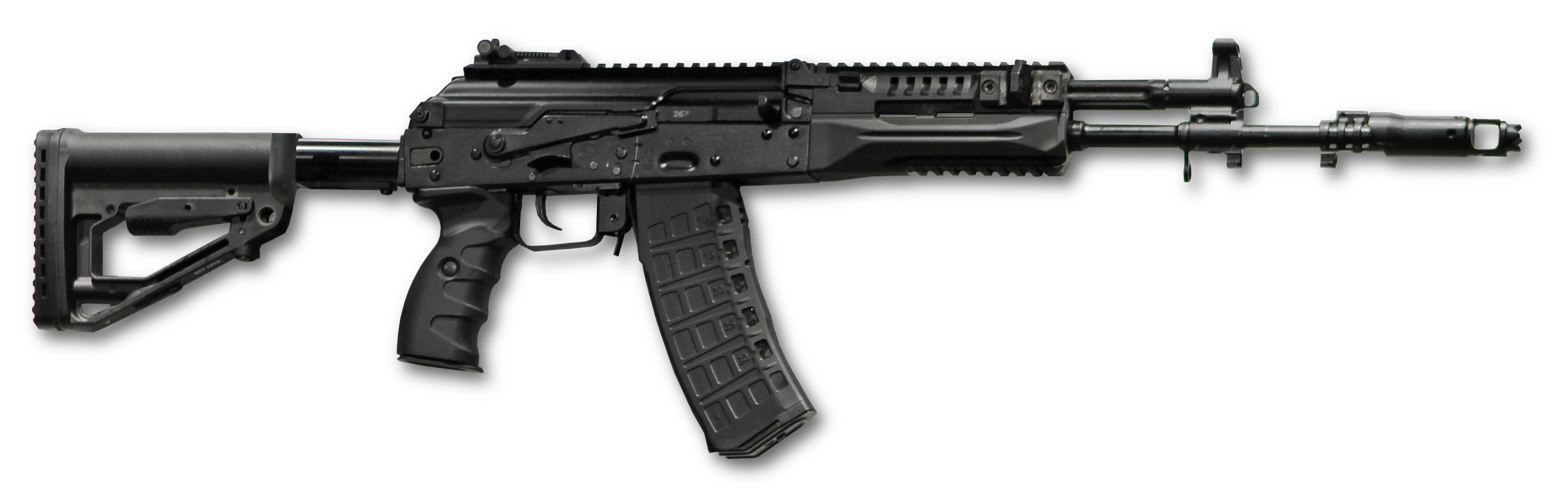
AK-12 assault rifle, replacing the AK-74M as the primary service rifle of the Russian Ground Forces

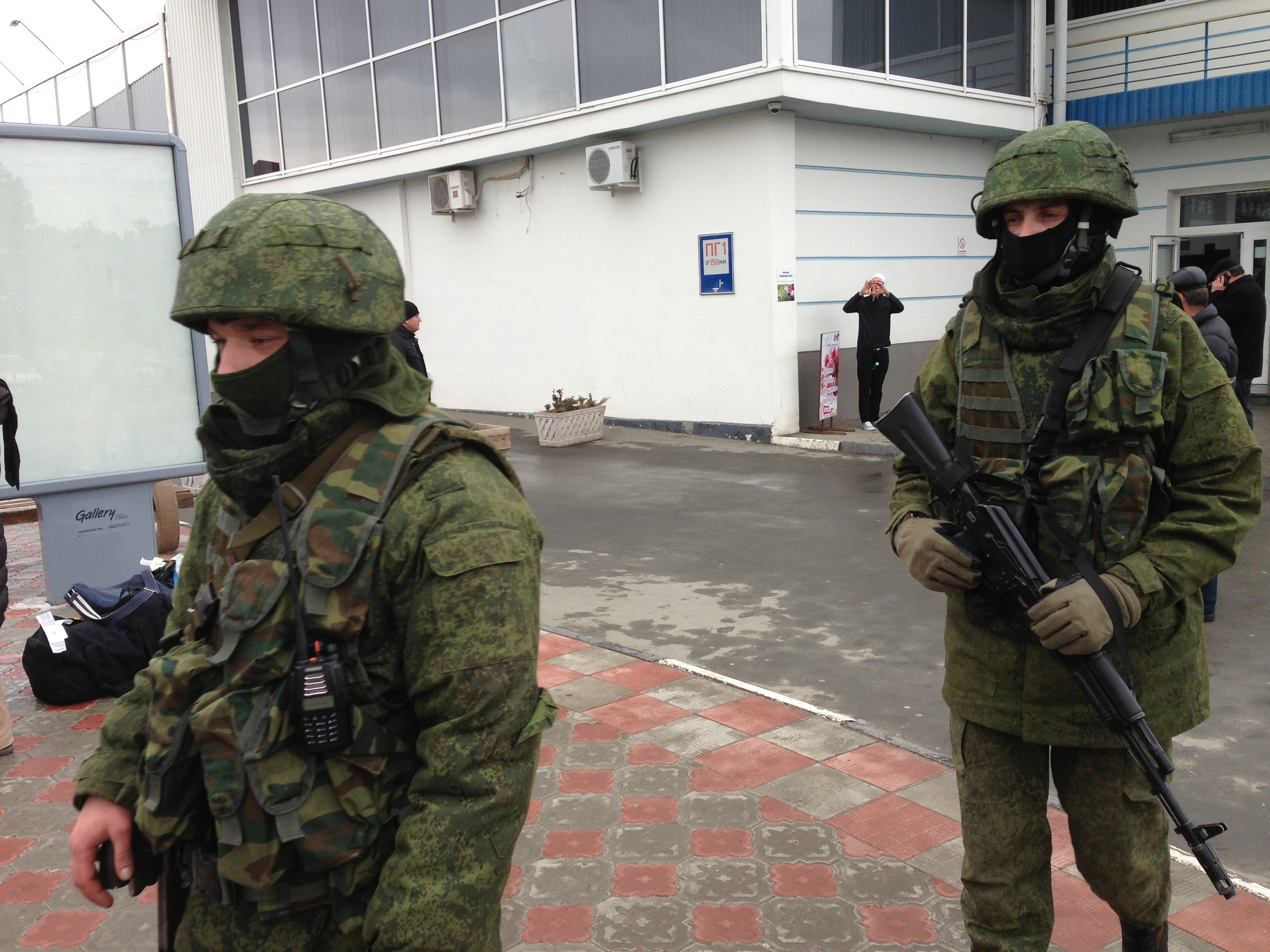
Unidentified riflemen wearing Ratnik equipment and armed with AK-74 rifles at Simferopol Airport in February 2014. The AK-74 carried by the rifleman on the right does not have a magazine inserted.

- AKM
- AKMS
- AK-74
- AK-74M
- AK-12
- AS Val
- FAMAS (captured)
- Malyuk (captured)

==== Precision rifles ====
- SVD
- VSSM Vintorez
- Zbroyar Z-10 (captured)

==== Anti-materiel rifles ====
- PTRD-41
- PTRS-41
- ASVK
- VKS Vykhlop

==== Machine guns ====
- RPK-74
- RPL-20
- PK
- PKM
- PM 1910/30
- PKP Pecheneg
- DShK
- KPV
- NSV

=== Explosives ===
==== Grenades ====
- RG-41
- F-1
- RGD-5
- RGN

==== Grenade launchers ====
- GP-25 Kostyor
- GP-34
- GM-94
- AGS-17 Plamya
- AGS-30 Atlant

==== Rocket launchers and recoilless rifles ====
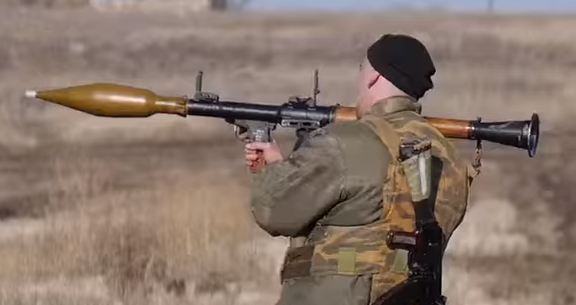
Donetsk 1st Slavyansk Brigade fighter with a RPG-7

- RPG-7
- RPG-18 Mukha
- RPG-22 Netto
- RPG-26 Aglen
- RPG-27 Tavolga
- RPG-29 Vampir
- RPG-30 Kryuk
- RPG-32 Barkas
- RPO-A Shmel
- MRO-A
- SPG-9 Kopyo

==== ATGMs ====
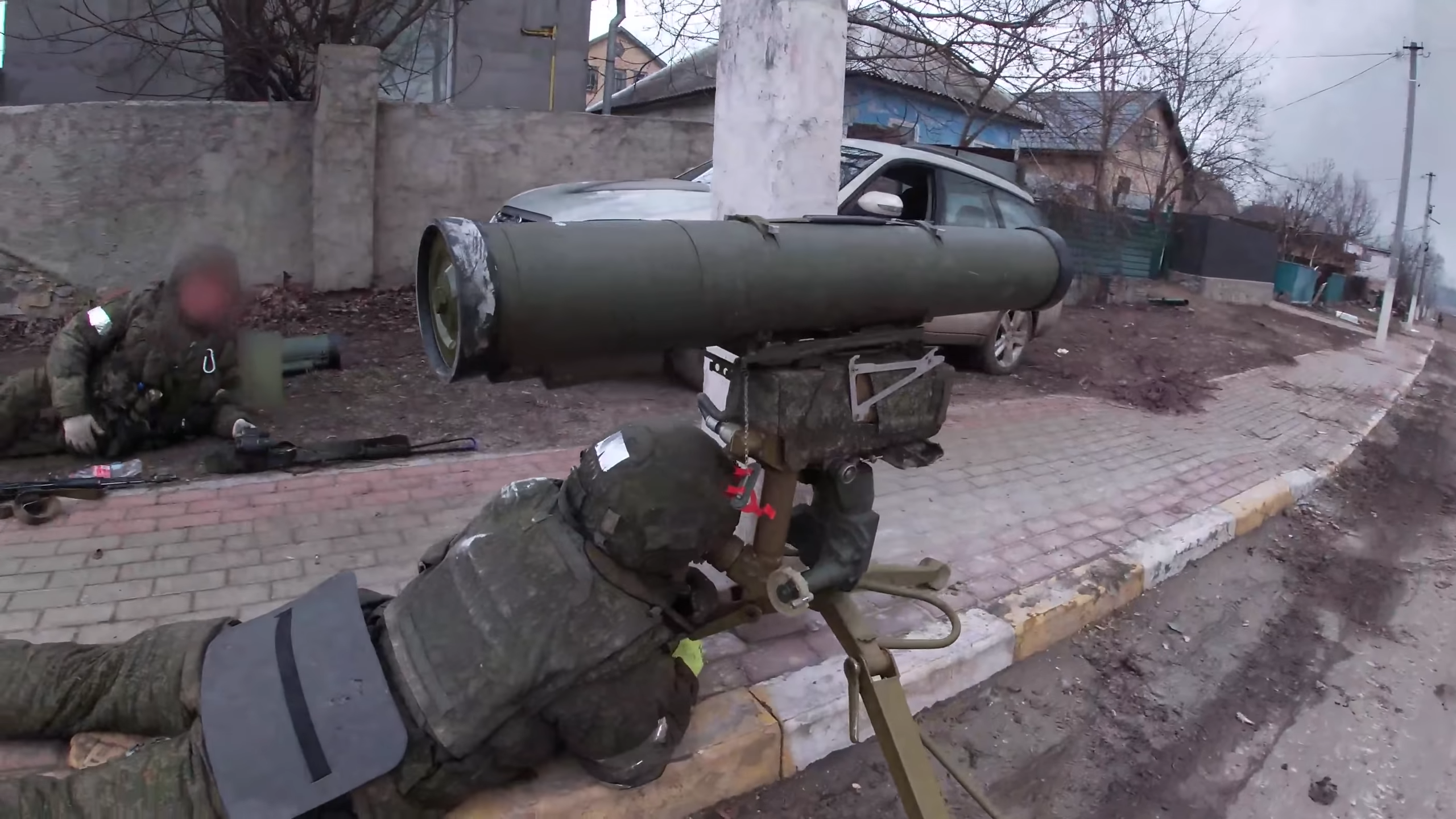
Russian Airborne Forces at Hostomel Airport armed with a 9M133 Kornet ATGM.

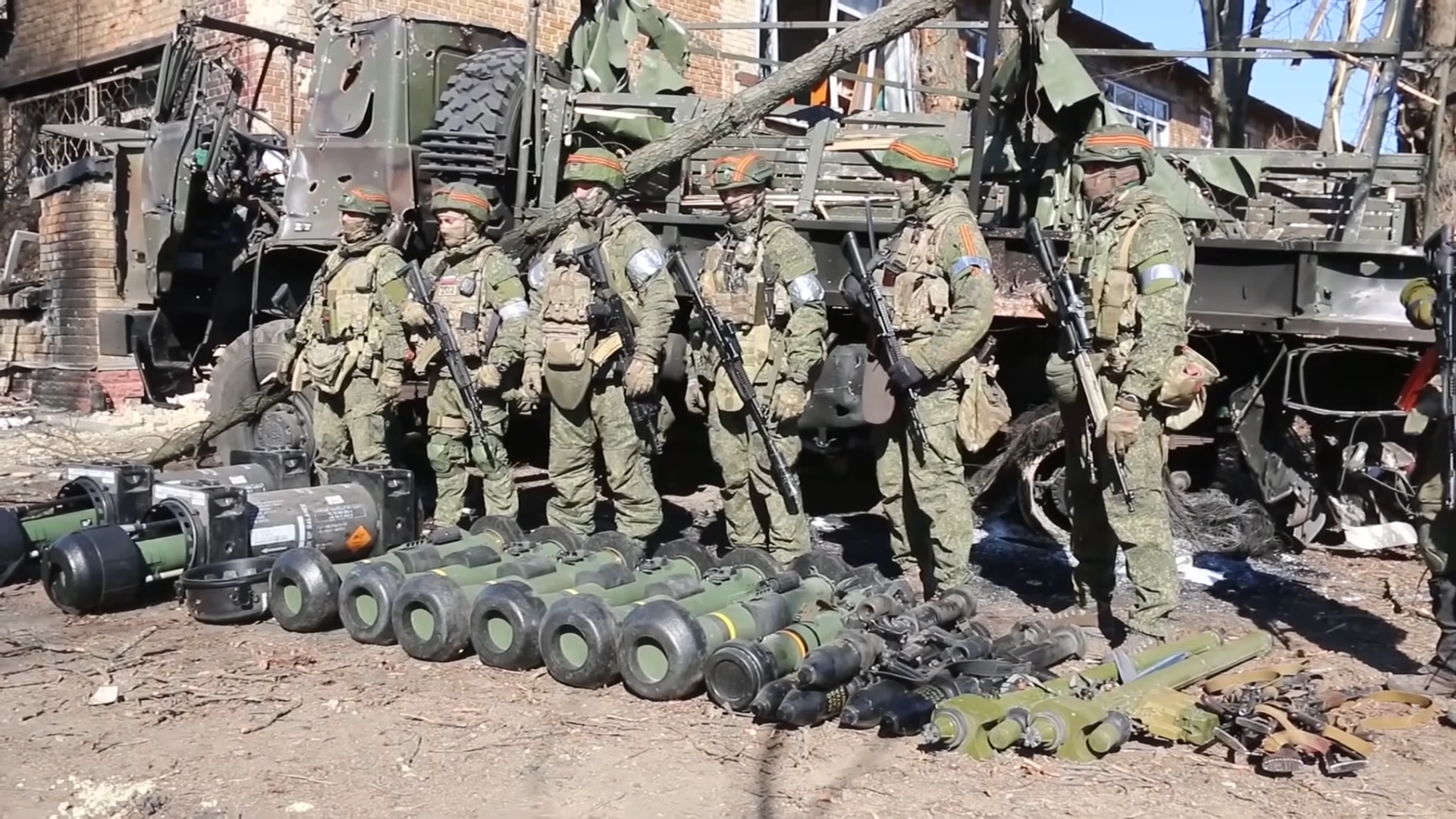
Russian Airborne Forces with captured Ukrainian weapons including NLAWs and Javelins.

- 9K111 Fagot
- 9K114 Shturm
- 9K115 Metis
- 9M113 Konkurs
- 9M133 Kornet
- M-2010
- NLAW (captured)
- FGM-148 Javelin (captured)

==== Anti-personnel mines ====
- MON-50
- MON-90
- MON-100
- OZM-72
- PMN-1
- PMN-2
- PMN-4
- POM-2
- PFM-1

==== Anti-tank mines ====
- PTM-1
- PTM-4M
- TM-62
- TM-72

=== Mortars ===
==== Infantry and towed mortars ====
- BM-37
- 2B14
- PM-43

==== Self-propelled mortars ====
- 2S4 Tyulpan
- 2S9 Nona
- 2S23 Nona-SVK
- 2S40 Floks

=== Artillery ===
==== Towed artillery ====
2A36 Giatsint-B of the Kalmius Brigade of the Donetsk People's Republic People's Militia

Russian Airborne Forces with 2A18 Lyagushka (D-30) towed artillery guns

- BS-3
- MT-12
- D-30
- M-30
- M-46
- 2A36 Giatsint-B
- 2A65 Msta-B
- D-1
- D-20
- 2B16 Nona-K
- M777 howitzer (captured)

==== Self-propelled artillery ====
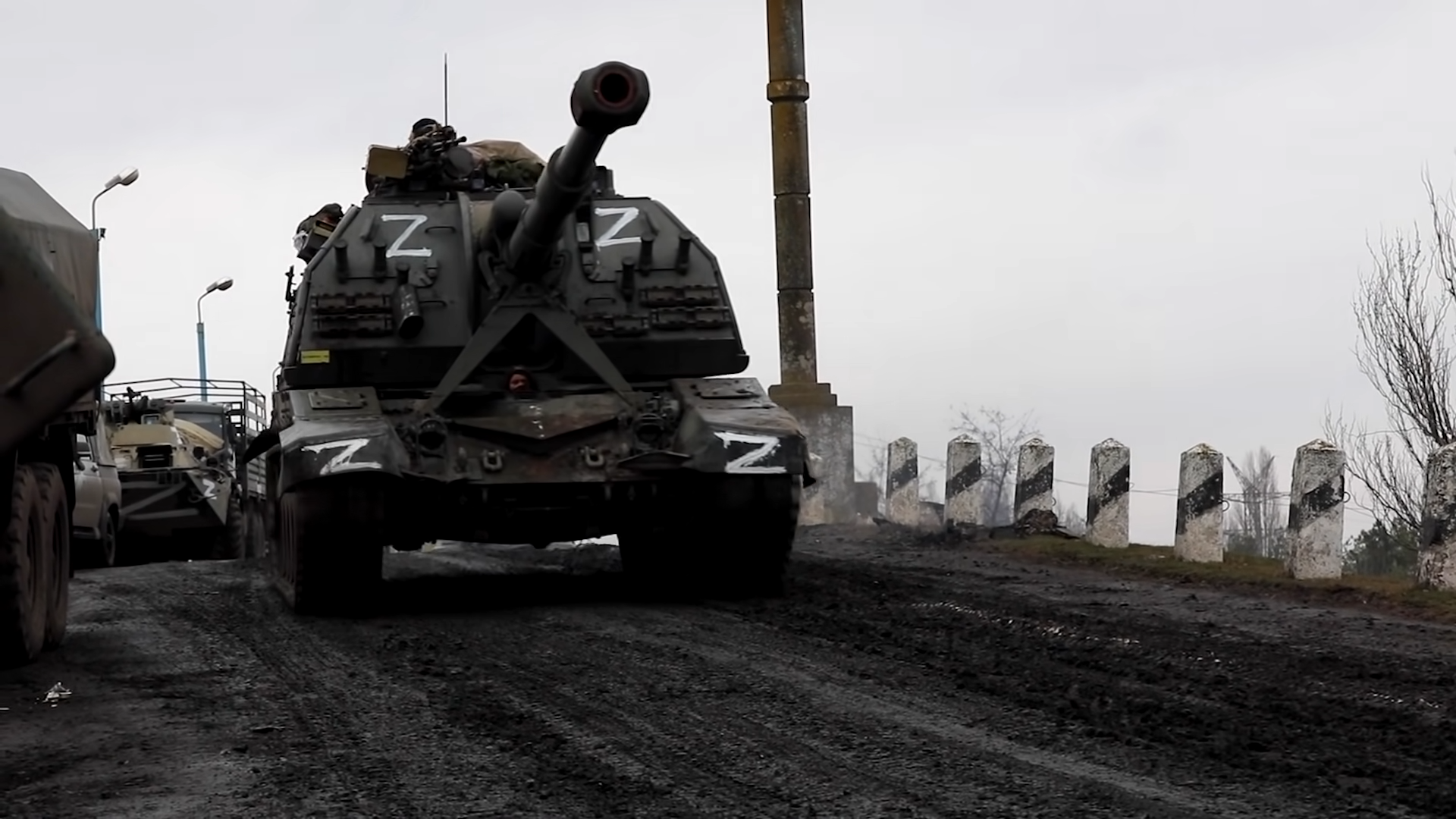
2S19 Msta-S

- 2S1 Gvozdika
- 2S3 Akatsiya
- 2S19 Msta-S
- 2S35 Koalitsiya-SV
- 2S43 Malva
- 2S7 Pion
- 2S7M Malka
- M1989 Koksan

==== Rocket artillery ====
TOS-1A Solntsepyok crews in combat action

- BM-21 Grad
- 9K51M Tornado-G
- BM-27 Uragan
- BM-30 Smerch
- 9K515 Tornado-S
- TOS-1A Solntsepyok
- TOS-2
- TOS-3
- Cheburashka
- Snezhinka

=== Air defense ===
==== MANPADS ====
- 9K32 Strela-2
- 9K34 Strela-3
- 9K38 Igla
- 9K333 Verba
- PPZR Grom

==== Anti-aircraft guns ====
- AZP S-60
- ZU-23-2

==== Air defense platforms ====
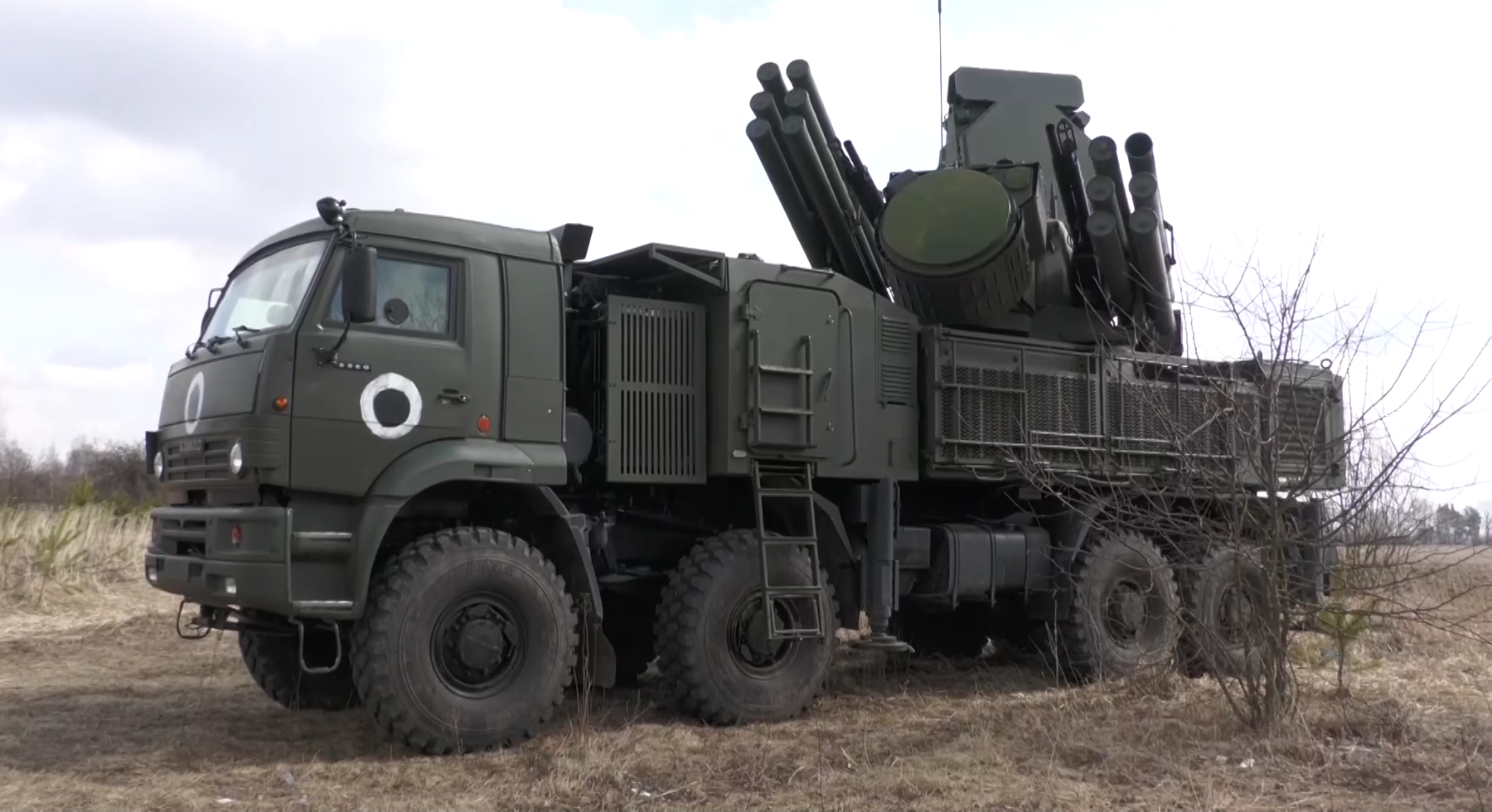
Pantsir-S1 air defense system.

- ZSU-23-4 Shilka
- 2K22 Tunguska
- 9K33 Osa
- 9K35 Strela-10
- 9K37 Buk
- 9K330 Tor
- Pantsir-S1
- S-300
- S-350 Vityaz
- S-400 Triumf

=== Electronic warfare and communication ===
- 51U6 Kasta-2E1
- R-330ZH Zhitel
- Stupor
- 1B76 Penicillin

=== Vehicles ===
==== Tanks ====
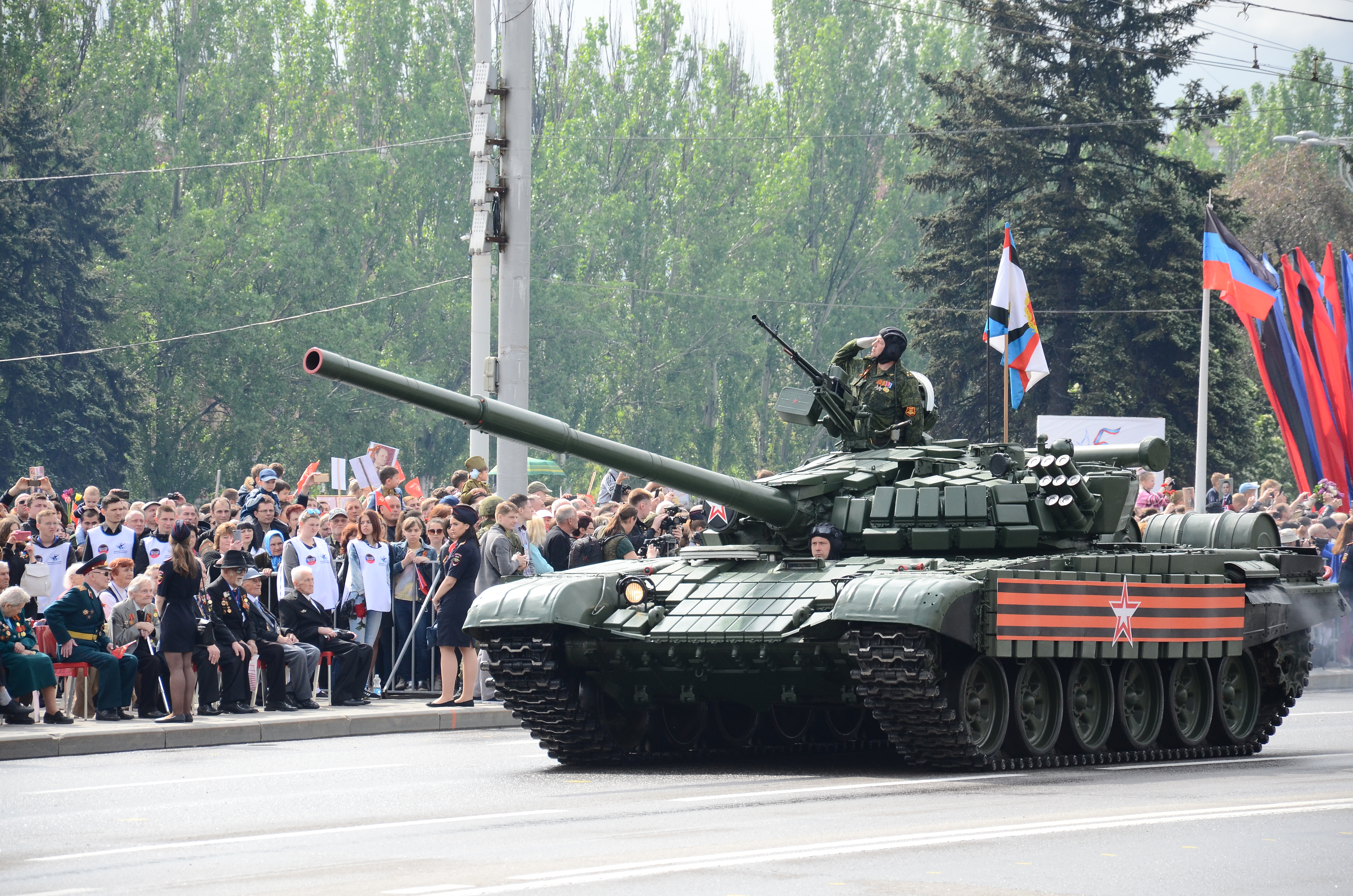
T-72 of the Donetsk People's Republic People's Militia

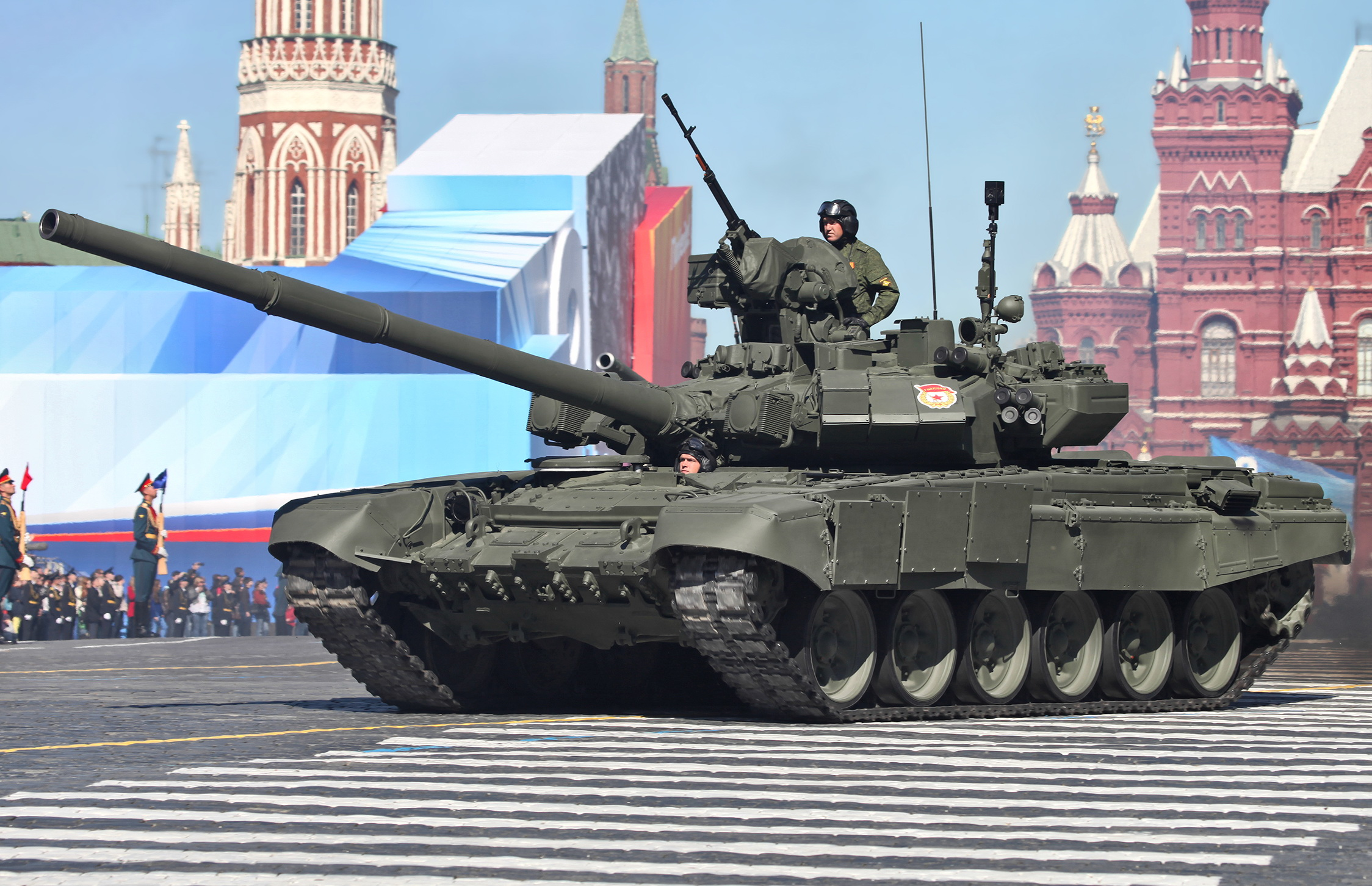
T-90 of the Russian Ground Forces.

- T-55
- T-62
- T-64
- T-72
- T-80
- T-90

==== Tank destroyers ====
- BMPT Terminator 2

==== Infantry fighting vehicles ====
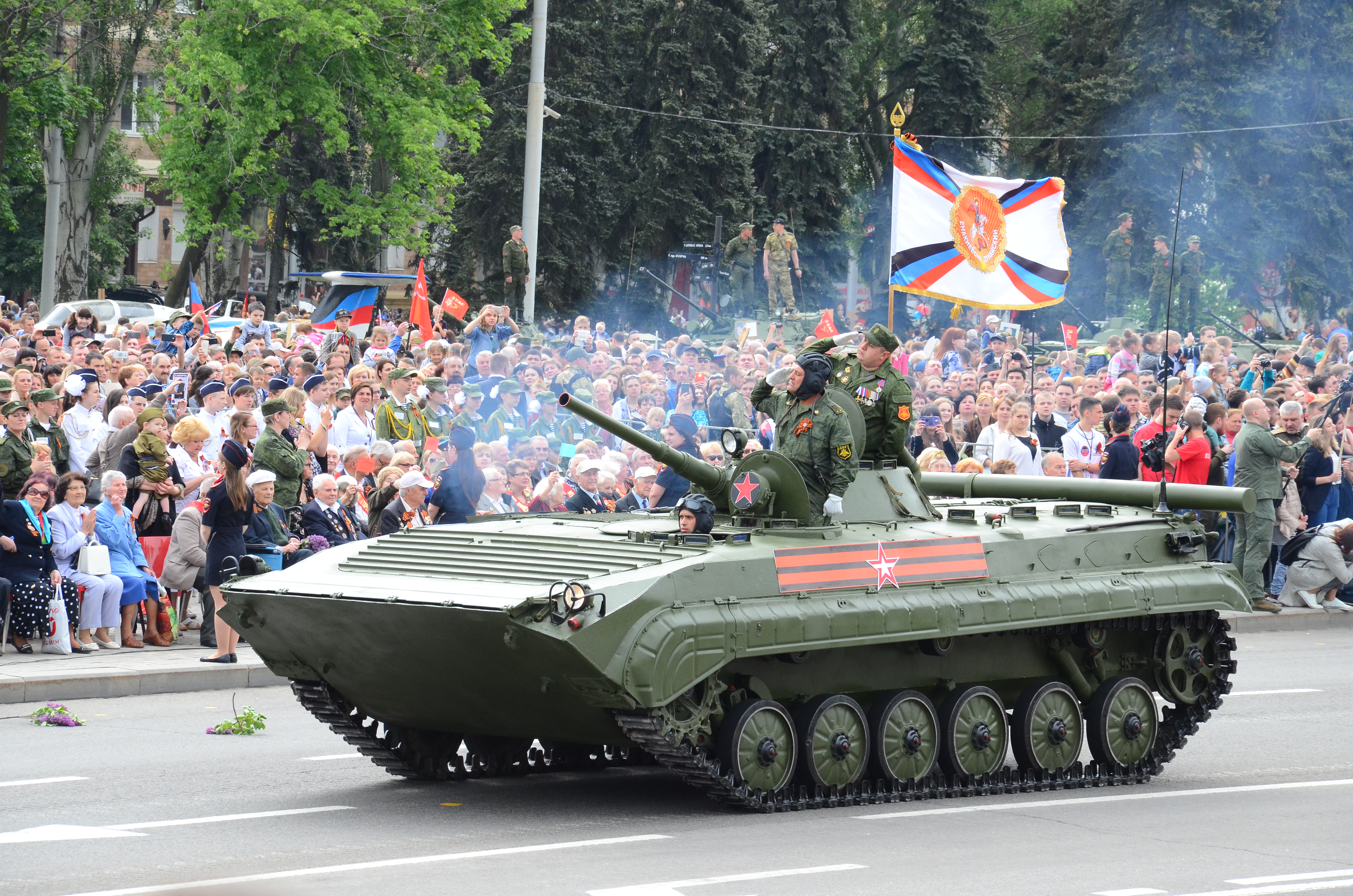
BMP-1 of the Donetsk People's Republic People's Militia

- BMP-1
- BMP-2
- BMP-3
- BMD-2
- BMD-4
- BTR-4 (captured)
- BTR-80A
- BTR-82A
- M2 Bradley (captured)
- YPR-765 (captured)

==== Armored personnel carriers ====
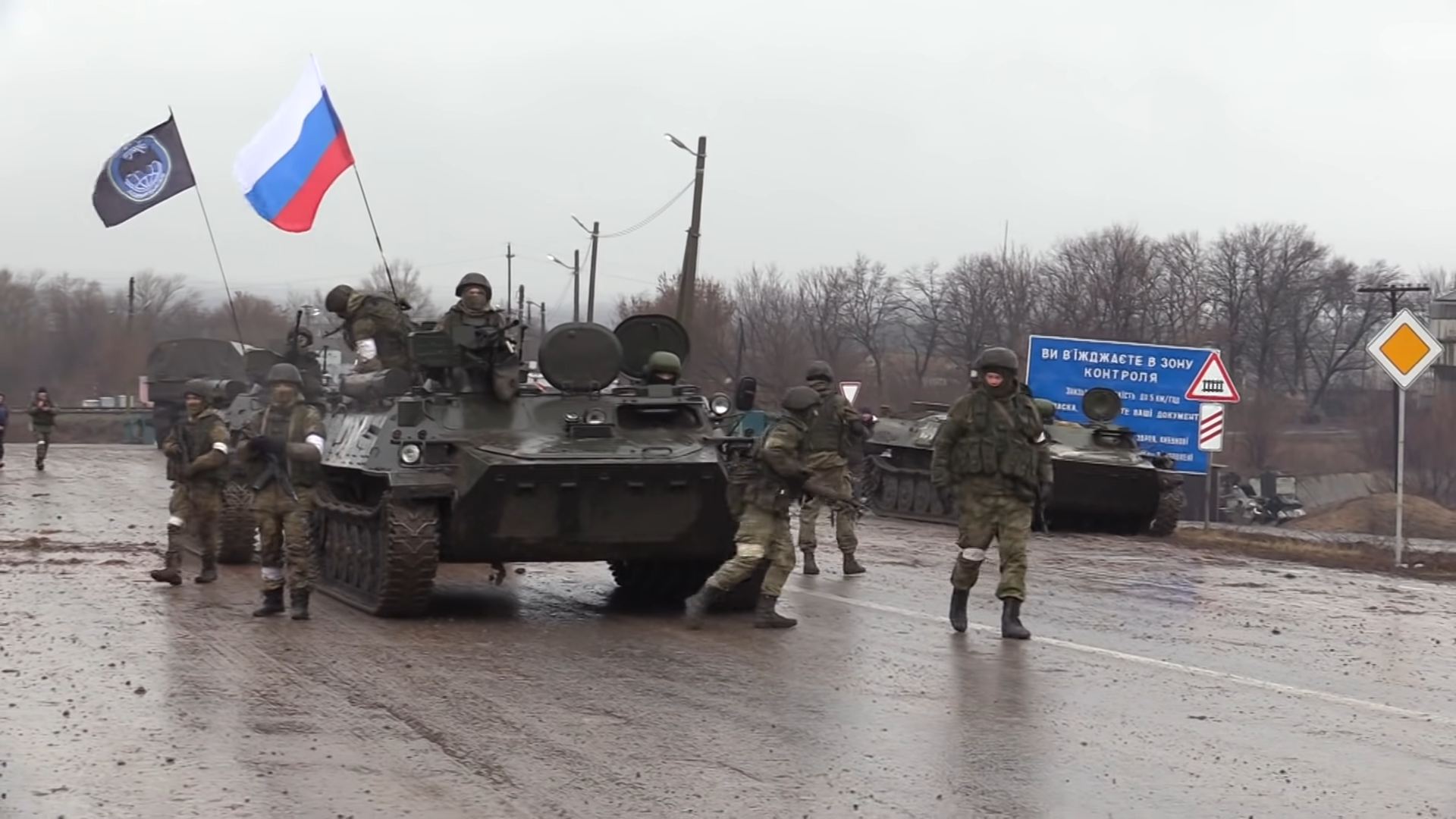
MT-LB

- MT-LB
- BTR-50
- BTR-60
- BTR-70
- BTR-80
- BTR-82
- BTR-D
- BTR-MD Rakushka
- BMO-T
- M113 (captured)
- Kozak (captured)

==== Infantry mobility vehicles ====
- Kamaz Typhoon
- KamAZ-435029 Patrul-A
- GAZ-2975 Tigr
- GAZ-3937 Vodnik
- Iveco Rys
- Vystrel
- Z-STS Akhmat
- Novator (captured)
- Roshel Senator (captured)
- STS Sarmat-2
- STS Sarmat-3

==== Improvised fighting vehicle ====
- Tsar Mangals

=== Trains ===
==== Armoured train ====
- Armored train (Yenisei, Volga, Amur, Baikal)

=== Aircraft ===
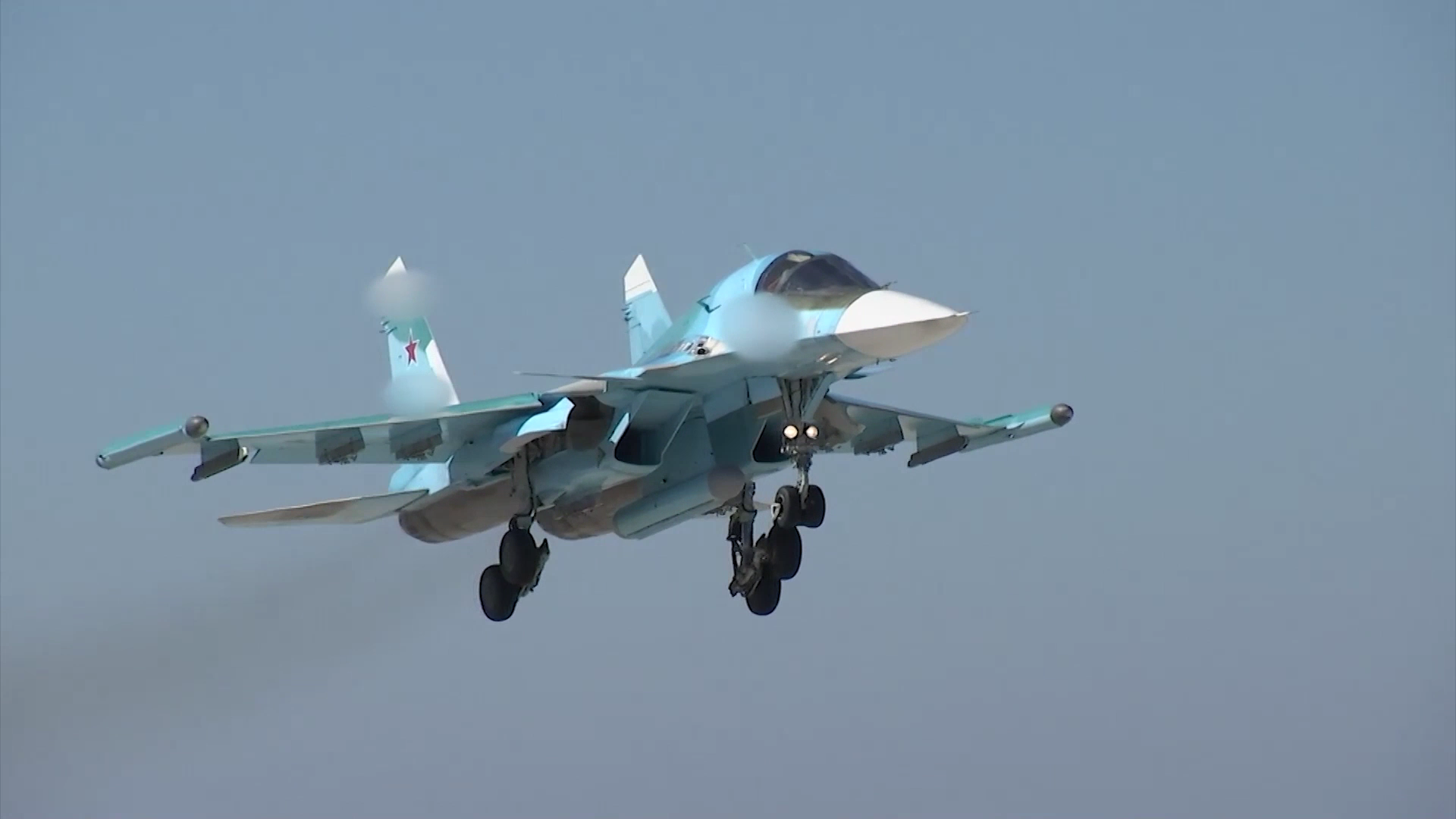
Sukhoi Su-34 fighter-bomber

==== Fixed-wing ====
- Aero L-39 Albatros
- Antonov An-22
- Beriev Be-12
- Beriev A-50U
- Ilyushin Il-20M
- Ilyushin Il-22PP
- Ilyushin Il-76
- Mikoyan MiG-29
- Mikoyan MiG-31
- Sukhoi Su-24
- Sukhoi Su-25
- Sukhoi Su-27
- Sukhoi Su-30
- Sukhoi Su-34
- Sukhoi Su-35
- Sukhoi Su-57
- Tupolev Tu-22M
- Tupolev Tu-95
- Tupolev Tu-214R

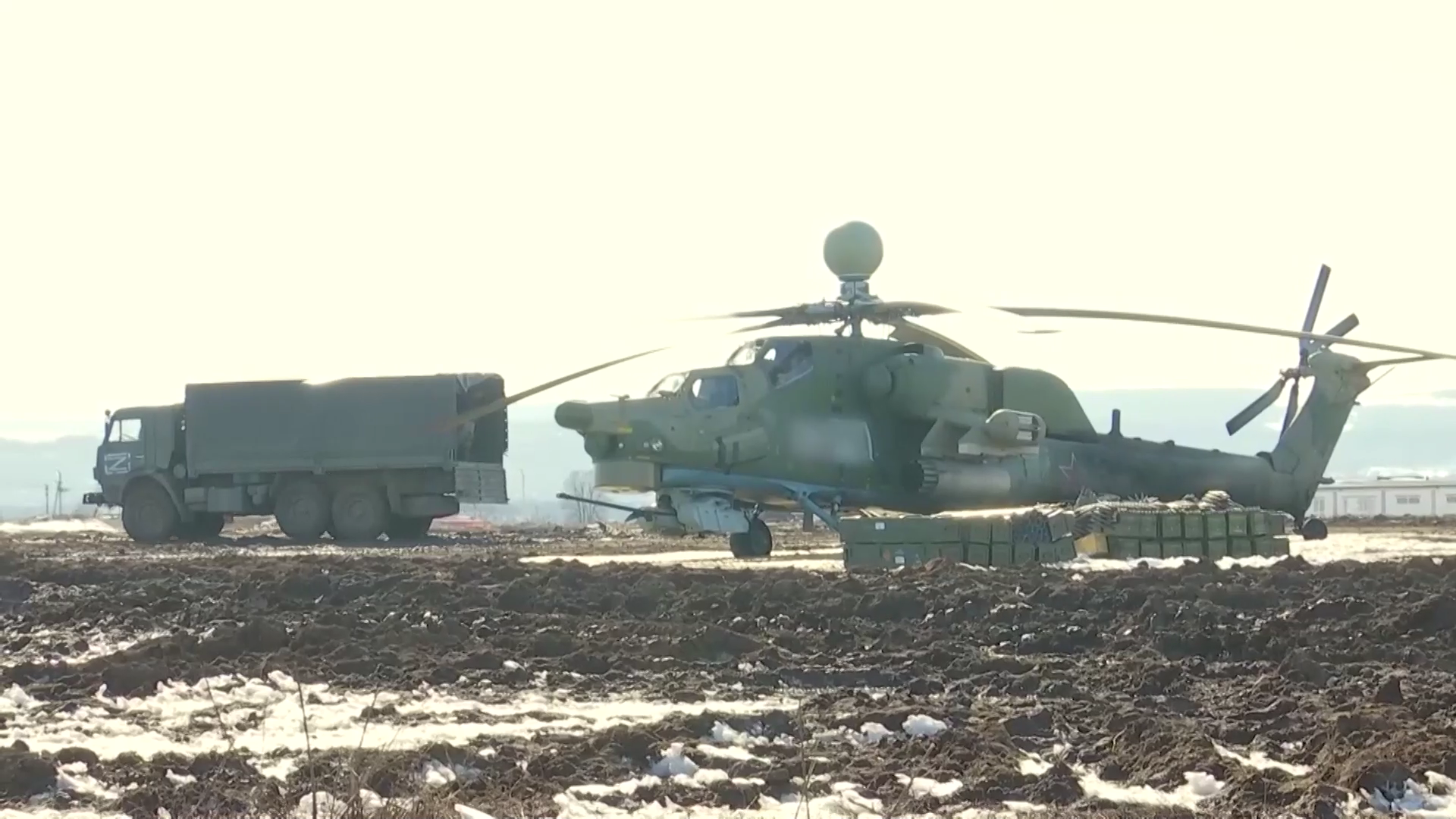
Mil Mi-28 attack helicopter at a forward deployment point.

==== Helicopters ====
- Kamov Ka-52
- Mil Mi-2
- Mil Mi-8
- Mil Mi-24/35
- Mil Mi-26
- Mil Mi-28

==== Unmanned aerial systems ====
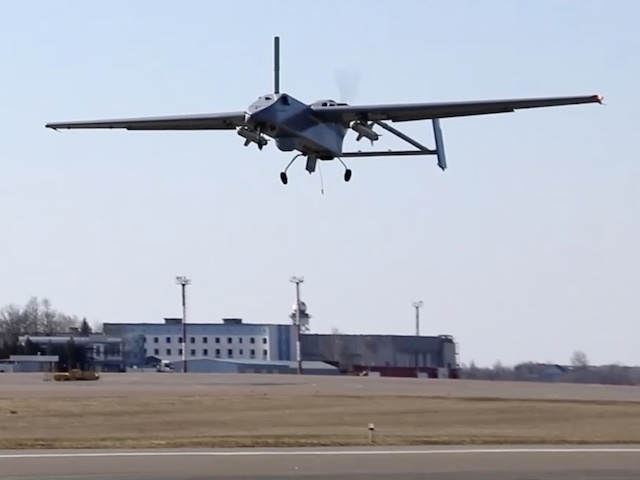
Forpost-R

===== Unmanned combat aerial vehicles =====
- Orion
- Forpost
- Mohajer-6

===== Reconnaissance drones =====
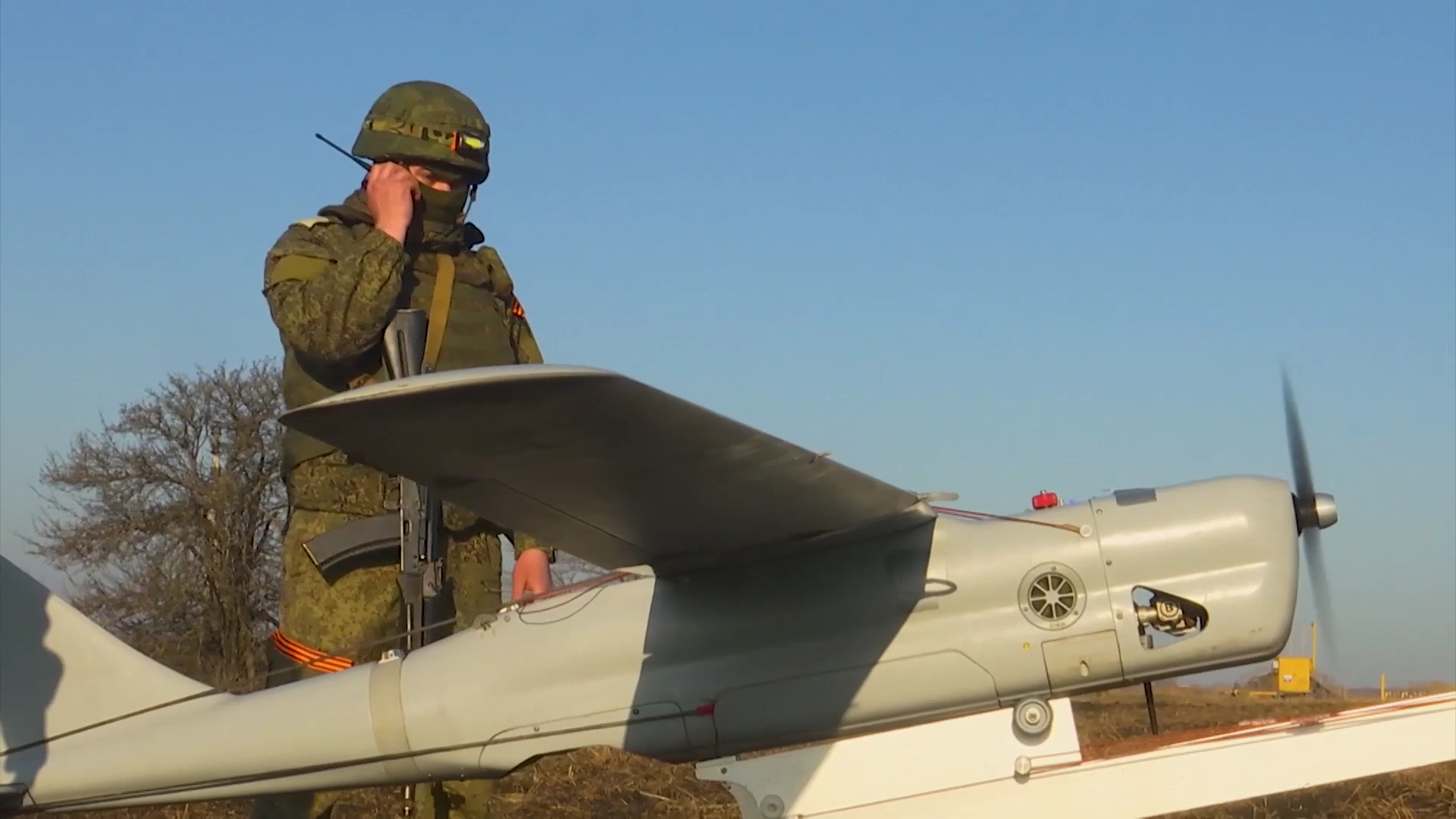
Russian soldier launches an Orlan-10 light unmanned reconnaissance vehicle.

- Orlan-10
- Supercam S350
- Granat-1
- Granat-2
- ENICS Eleron-3
- Zastava
- ZALA 421-08

===== Loitering munitions =====
- ZALA Lancet
- Chekan
- Geran-1
- Geran-2
- DJI FPV

=== Ships ===
==== Cruisers ====
- Project 1134B Berkut B [Kara-class] (Ochakov). Scuttled, used as blockship.Refloated towed to Inkerman to await scrapping a few months later.
- Project 1164 Atlant [Slava-class] (Moskva). Sunk in action.

==== Frigates ====
- Project 11356R/M [Admiral Grigorovich-class] (Admiral Essen, Admiral Makarov)

==== Corvettes ====
Project 21631 corvette of the Black Sea Fleet launching 3M-54 Kalibr cruise missiles

- Project 21631 Buyan-M (Grad Sviyazhsk, Uglich, Velikiy Ustyug, Vyshniy Volochyok, Orekhovo-Zuyevo, Ingushetiya, Grayvoron)

==== Amphibious warfare ships ====
- Project 11711 [Ivan Gren-class] (Pyotr Morgunov)
- Project 775 [Ropucha class] (Tsezar Kunikov, Novocherkassk, Yamal, Azov, Korolyov, Minsk, Kaliningrad, Georgy Pobedonosets, Olenegorsky Gornyak)
- Project 1171 Tapir [Alligator-class](Saratov, Orsk, Nikolai Filchenkov)
- Project 11770 Serna [Serna-class]
- Project 02510 [Type BK-16]

==== Auxiliary vessels ====
- Project 22870 (Spasatel Vasily Bekh). Sunk in action.
- Project 22160 (Sergey Kotov). Sunk in action.

=== Ordnance ===
==== Air-to-surface missiles ====
- Kh-22
- Kh-29 (Sukhoi Su-34)
- Kh-31
- Kh-32
- Kh-47M2 Kinzhal
- Kh-58
- Kh-69
- Kh-101 (Tupolev Tu-95, Tupolev Tu-160)
- Kh-555 (Tupolev Tu-95, Tupolev Tu-160)

==== Surface-to-surface missiles ====
- 3M-51 Alfa
- 3M-54 Kalibr
- 3M-59 Oniks
- 9K720 Iskander
- 9M728 Iskander-K
- OTR-21 Tochka
- Hwasong-11A (KN-23)

==== Air-to-air missiles ====
- R-77-1
- R-77M
- R-37M
- R-60

== Ukrainian and Ukrainian volunteer forces ==
=== Individual equipment ===
==== Helmets ====
- SSh-60
- SSh-68
- Kaska-2M
- Hełm wz. 2000
- Hełm wz. 2005
- Mk 6 helmet
- Mk 7 helmet
- Schuberth B826
- PASGT
- Ops-Core FAST

=== Small arms ===
==== Pistols and revolvers ====
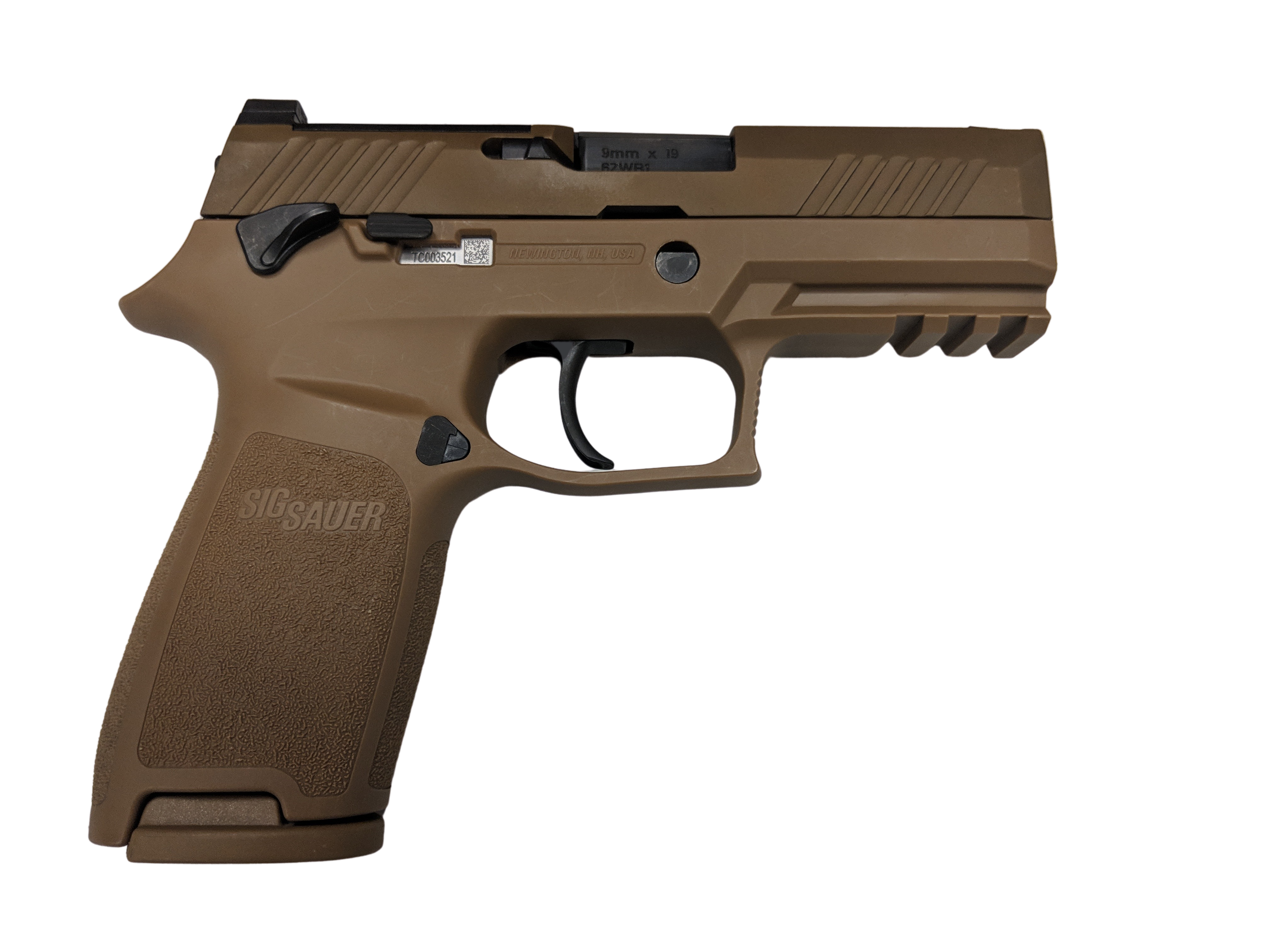
M18 pistol, supplied by the United States to Ukraine.

- TT-33
- PM
- APS
- Fort-12
- Fort-14TP
- Fort-17
- CZ-75B
- CZ 82
- Glock 17
- Kimber R7 Mako
- Heckler & Koch VP9
- Beretta M9
- Browning Hi-Power

==== Submachine guns ====
- Brügger & Thomet APC
- FB PM-63
- Fort 230
- Škorpion vz. 61

==== Shotguns ====
- Mossberg 500
- Benelli M4
- Saiga-12
- KS-23
- Fort-500

==== Bolt-action rifles ====
- Mosin-Nagant 1891/30

==== Battle rifles ====
- M14 rifle
- Beretta ARX200
- FN FAL
- Robinson Armament XCR

==== Assault rifles and carbines ====
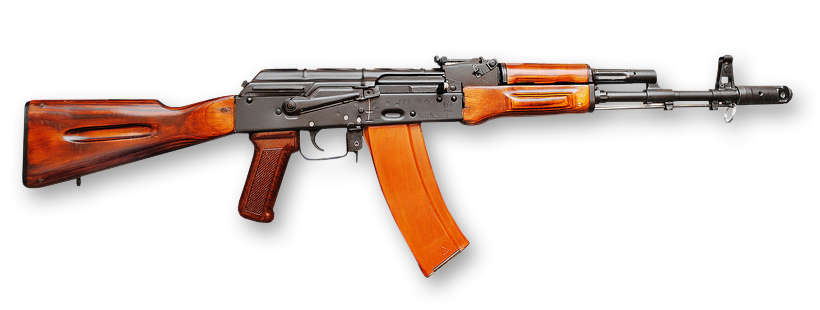
AK-74

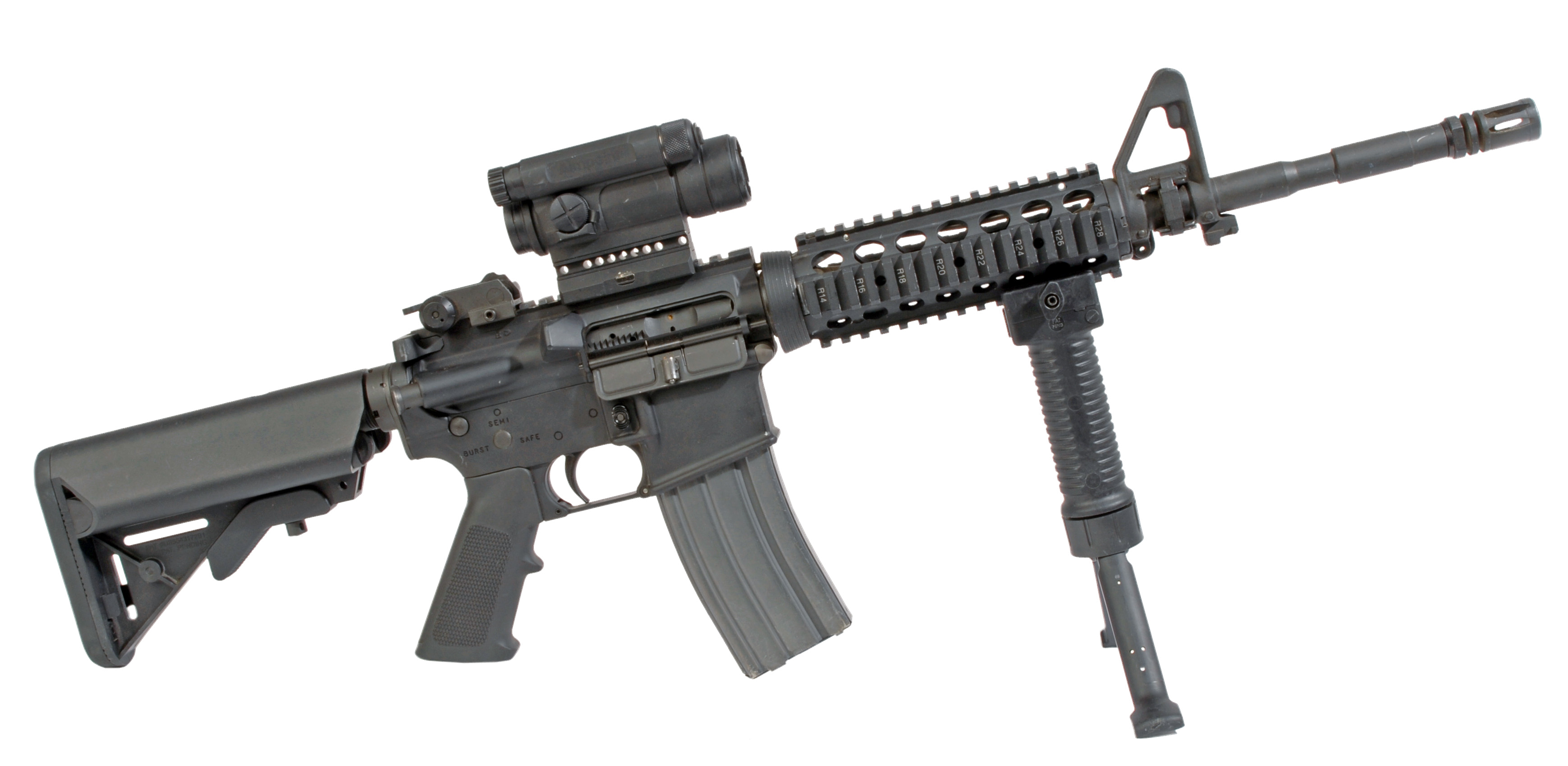
M4 carbine

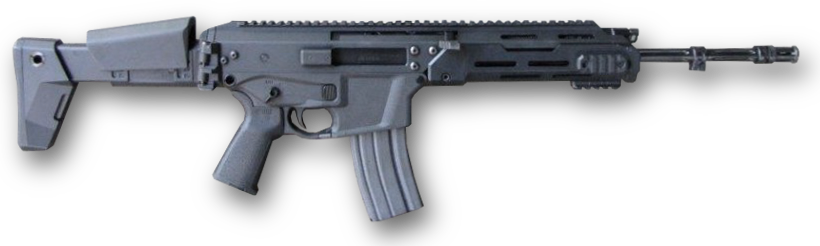
FB Radom MSBS Grot

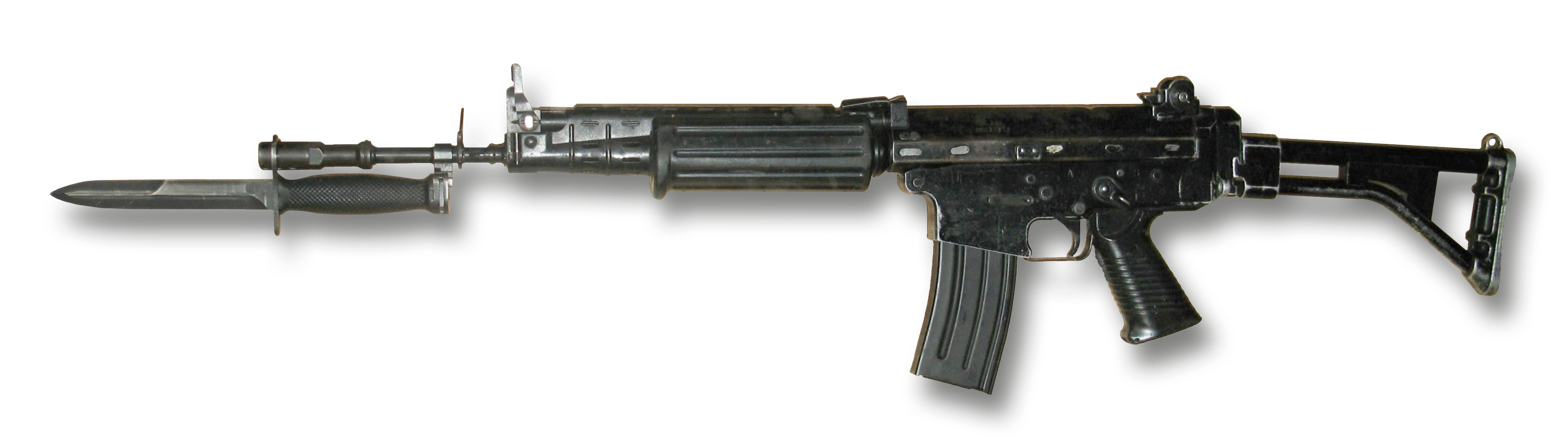
FN FNC

- Malyuk
- Fort-221
- Fort-222
- AK-74
- AK-74M (captured)
- AK-12 (captured)
- AKS-74
- AKS-74U
- vz. 58
- FN FNC
- FN SCAR-L
- FN F2000
- Zastava M70
- Colt Canada C7
- Colt Canada C8
- Steyr AUG
- Mk 18 Mod 0/1
- FAMAS
- FB Tantal
- FB Beryl
- FB MSBS Grot
- Mayak MZ-10
- M16 rifle
- M4 carbine
- PM md. 90
- SA80 (during training in Britain)

==== Precision rifles ====
- C14 Timberwolf
- Colt Canada C20
- SVD
- M110 Semi-Automatic Sniper System
- UAR-10
- Savage Model 110
- Kimber Model 84
- Desert Tech SRS
- Desert Tech HTI
- SIG Sauer SSG3000
- Sauer 100
- SV-98
- M21 sniper weapon system
- M24 sniper weapon system
- Type 85 marksman rifle
- Stiletto Systems STL-016

==== Anti-material rifles ====
- Snipex Alligator
- Snipex T-Rex
- Snipex Rhino Hunter
- Snipex M100
- PGW Defence LRT-3
- ZVI Falcon
- Bushmaster BA50
- Barret M82
- ASVK (Captured)

==== Machine guns ====
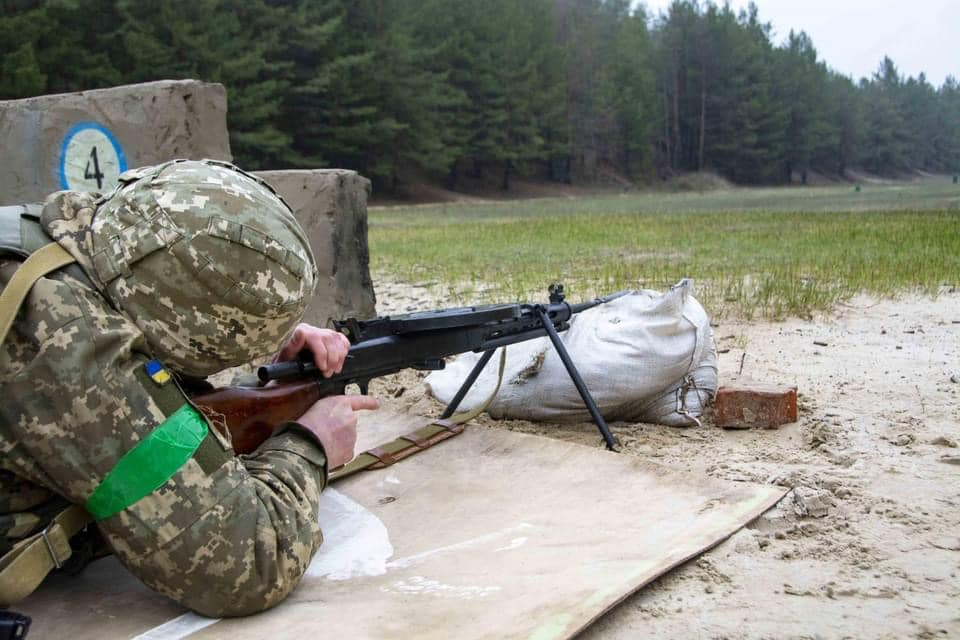
Ukrainian soldier with a DPM machine gun

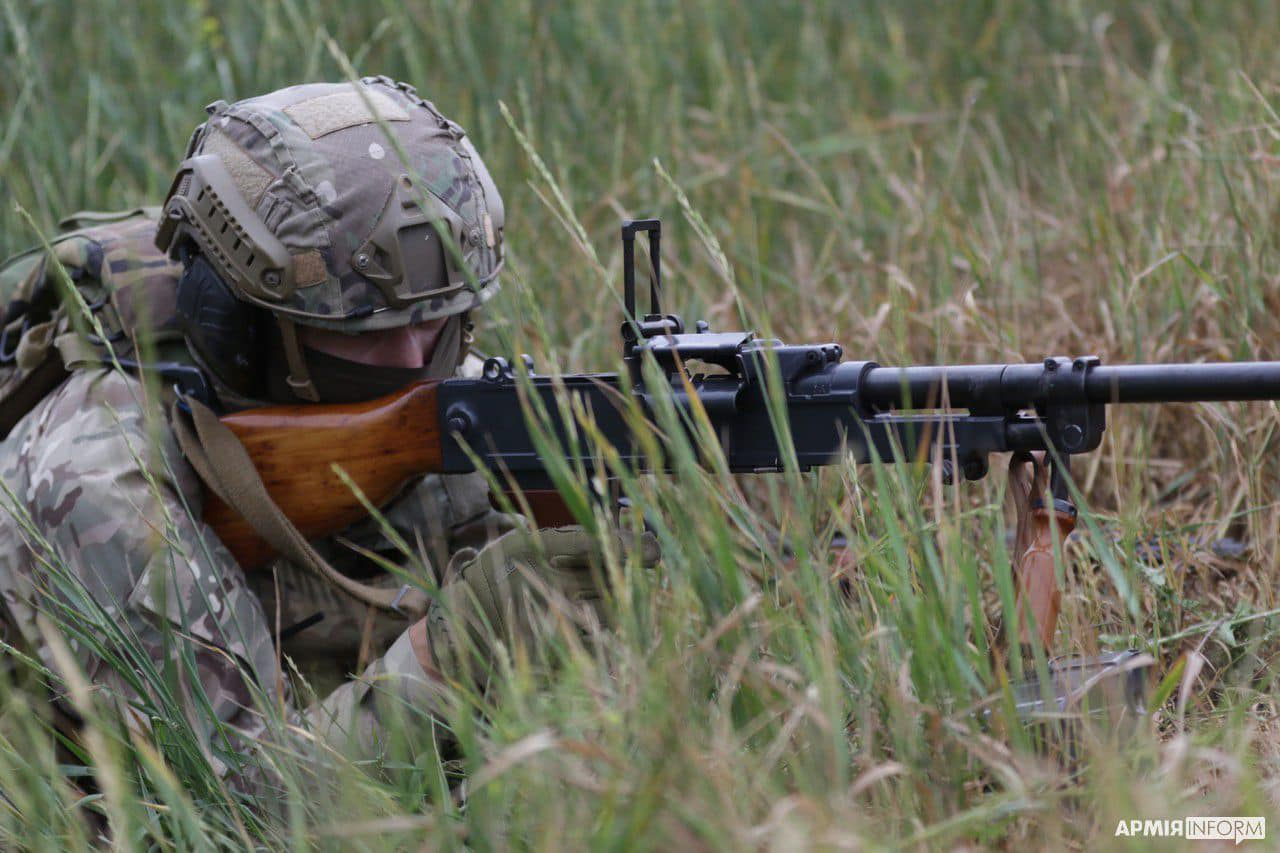
Ukrainian soldier with a UK vz. 59 machine gun

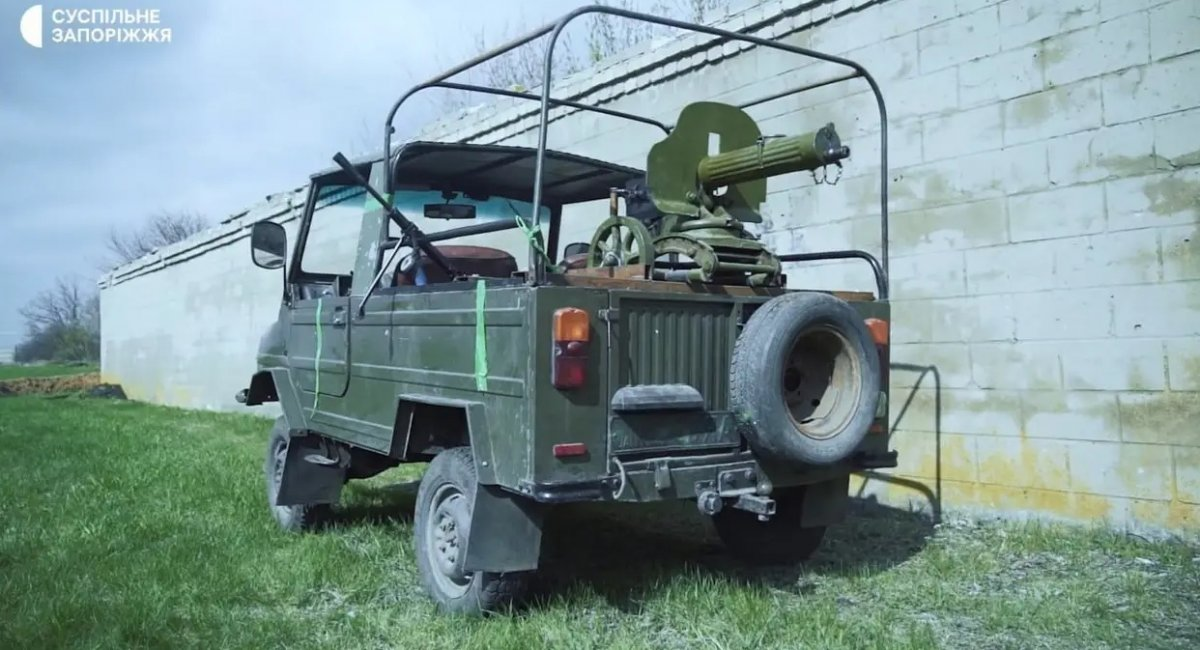
Ukrainian technical made with a LuAZ-969 with PM M1910 and DP-27 machine guns.

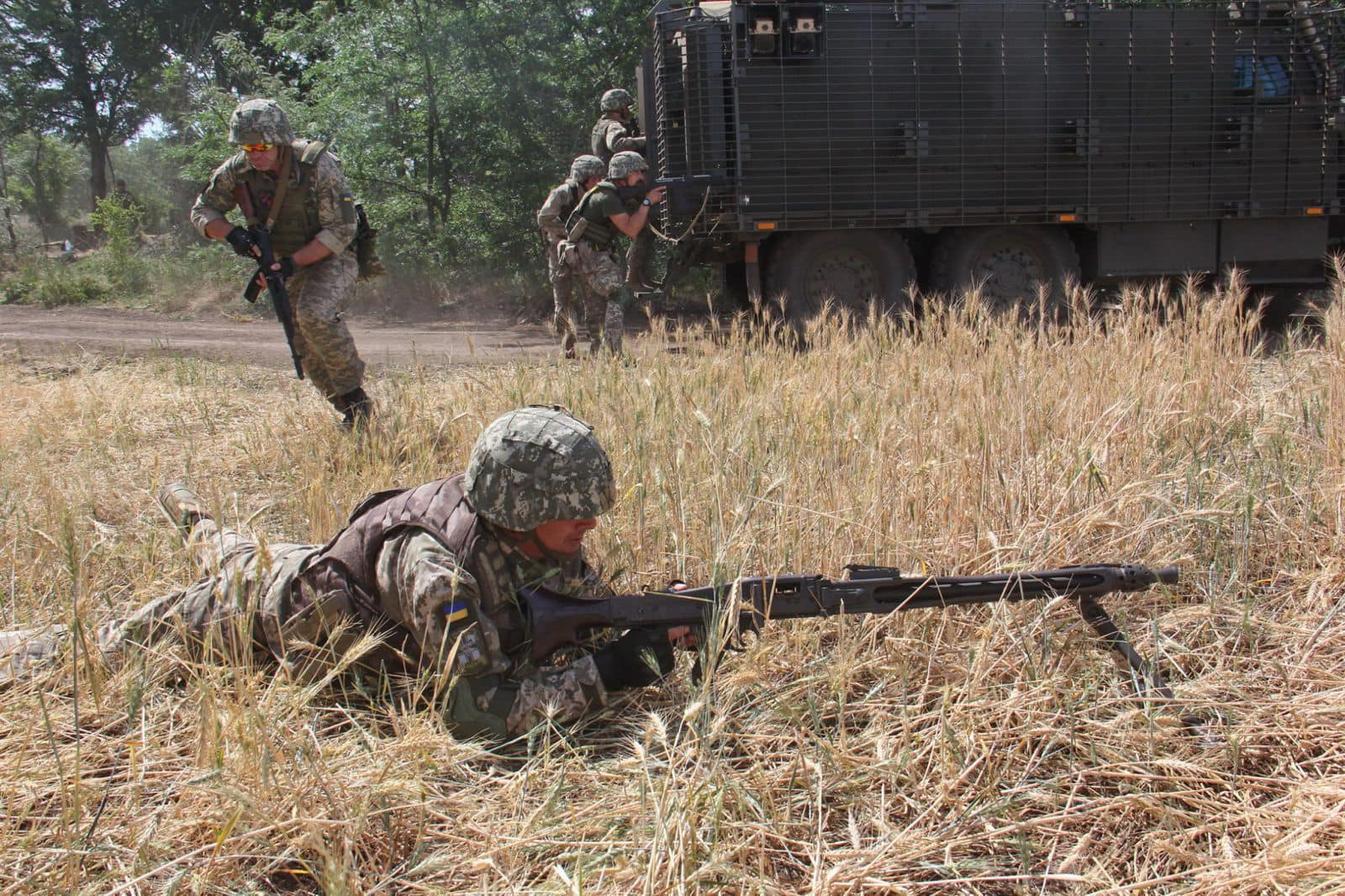
Ukrainian Naval Infantry with a Rheinmetall MG 3 machine gun

- DP-27
- RPD
- RPK
- RPK-74
- Zastava M53
- Beretta MG 42/59
- Rheinmetall MG 3
- Ksp 58 B
- UK vz. 59
- FN Minimi
- M2 machine gun
- M240 machine gun
- M249 light machine gun
- PK
- PM M1910
- DShK
- NSV
- KPV
- IWI Negev
- W85 heavy machine gun
- Arsenal MG-1M
- UKM-2000

=== Explosives ===
==== Grenades ====
- VOG-25
- RGD-5
- F-1
- RDG-2
- RGN
- RGO
- RKG-3
- M18 smoke grenade
- M67 grenade
- L109 grenade
- DM51
- Sirpalekäsikranaatti m/50

==== Grenade launchers ====
- UAG-40
- AGS-17
- GP-25 Kostyor
- Fort-600
- RGP-40
- RGSh-30
- EAGLE grenade launcher
- M32 multi-shot grenade launcher
- M203 grenade launcher
- M320 grenade launcher module
- Mk 19 grenade launcher

==== Anti-personnel mines ====
- OZM-72
- M18 Claymore mine

==== Anti-tank mines ====
- TM-62
- TM-72
- AT2
- DM 31
- DM 12 PARM 2
- HPD-2
- PK-14

==== Rocket launchers and recoilless rifles ====
- RPG-7
- RPG-16
- RPG-18 Mukha
- RPG-22 Netto
- RPG-26 Aglen
- RPG-32 Nashshab
- RPG-75
- RPG-76 Komar
- Panzerfaust 3
- Instalaza Alcotán-100
- Instalaza C90
- M72 LAW
- M80 Zolja
- M141 Bunker Defeat Munition
- PSRL-1
- SPG-9 Kopyo
- MATADOR
- APILAS
- M136 AT4

==== ATGMs ====
- Skif
- RK-3 Corsar
- MILAN
- NLAW
- FGM-148 Javelin
- BGM-71 TOW
- 9M133 Kornet (captured)

=== Mortars ===
==== Infantry mortars ====
- 120-PM-38
- 2S12 Sani
- M120-15 Molot
- KBA-48M
- LMP-2017
- 120 KRH 92
- HM 15
- HM 16
- HM 19
- MO-120 RT
- 240 mm mortar M240
- M224 Lightweight Company Mortar System
- 20N5
- vz. 82 PRAM-L
- M69

==== Self-propelled mortars ====
- 2S9 Nona
- Bars-8
- M113 Panzermörser

=== Artillery ===
==== Towed artillery ====
- 2P22 Bohdana
- D-20
- D-44
- D-30
- L118 light gun
- 2A36 Giatsint-B
- 2A65 Msta-B
- 2B16 Nona-K
- M-46
- MT-12 Rapira
- OTO Melara Mod 56
- M101 howitzer
- M119 howitzer
- M777 howitzer
- FH70 howitzer
- Pansarvärnspjäs 1110 recoilless gun
- TRF1

==== Self-propelled artillery ====
- 2S1 Gvozdika
- 2S3 Akatsiya
- 2S5 Giatsint-S
- 2S7 Pion
- 2S19 Msta
- 2S22 Bohdana
- ASU-85
- SpGH DANA
- ShKH Zuzana 2
- M109 howitzer
- CAESAR
- Panzerhaubitze 2000
- AHS Krab
- L131 AS-90
- Archer

==== Rocket artillery ====
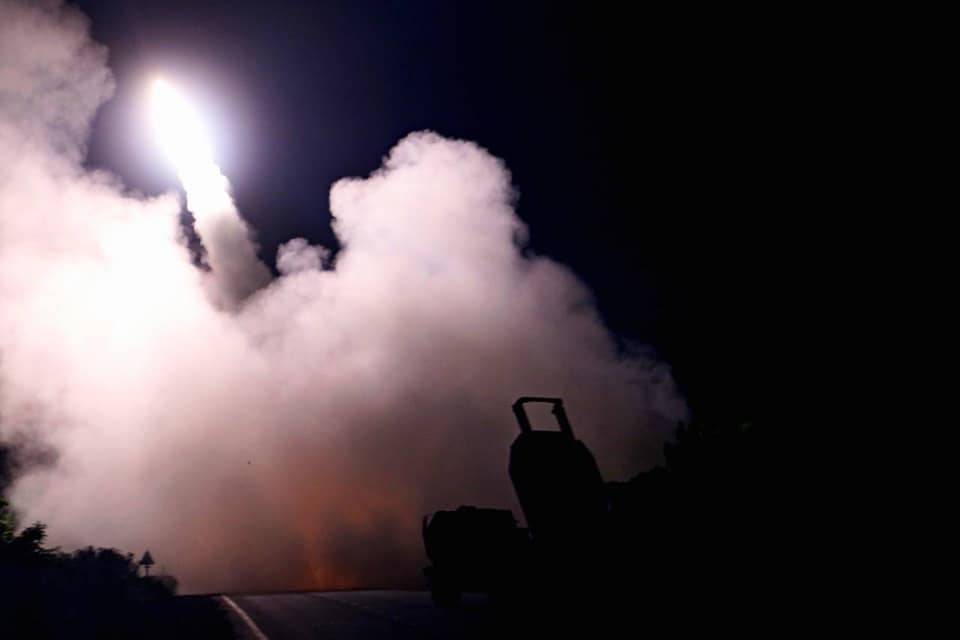
Ukrainian M142 HIMARS vehicles in Zaporizhia Oblast in June 2022

- BM-21 Grad
- BM-27 Uragan
- BM-30 Smerch
- Bureviy
- Vilkha
- RM-70 Vampir
- TLRG-230
- M142 High Mobility Artillery Rocket System
- M270 Multiple Launch Rocket System

=== Air defense ===
==== MANPADS ====
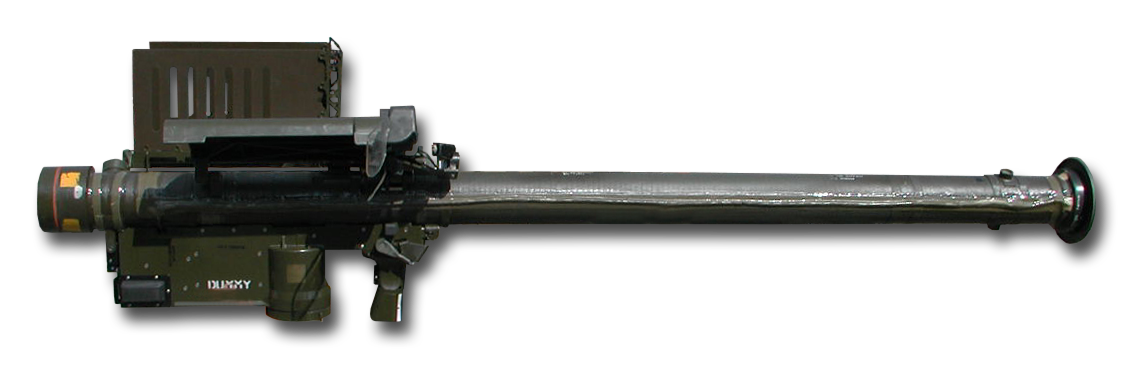
FIM-92 Stinger

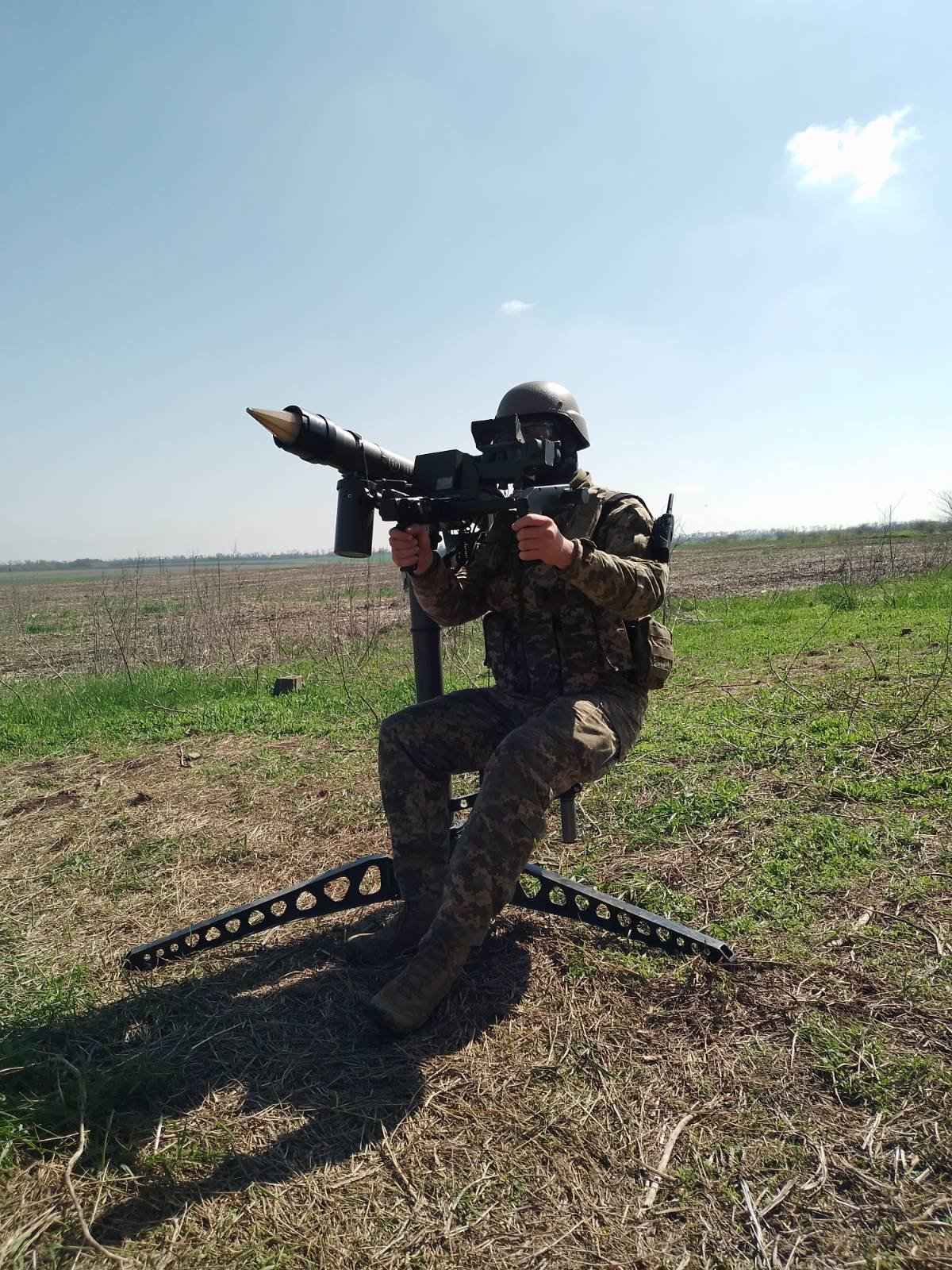
Soldier of the Ukrainian 3rd Tank Brigade showing a Mistral short range air defense system provided by France.

- 9K38 Igla
- 9K32 Strela-2
- 9K34 Stela-3
- Piorun
- FIM-92 Stinger
- Starstreak
- Mistral

==== Anti-aircraft guns ====
- KS-19
- ZPU-1
- ZPU-2
- AZP S-60
- ZU-23-2
- ITK 61 Sergei
- Zastava M55
- Bofors 40 mm Automatic Gun L/70

==== Air defense platforms ====
- ZSU-23-4 Shilka
- 2K12 Kub
- 2K22 Tunguska
- 9K33 Osa
- 9K35 Strela-10
- 9K37 Buk
- 9K330 Tor
- S-125 Pechora
- S-300 Antey
- Flugabwehrkanonenpanzer Gepard
- SIDAM 25
- Alvis Stormer
- Crotale
- NASAMS
- IRIS-T SL
- VAMPIRE
- Excalibur Army Viktor
- AN/TWQ-1 Avenger
- MIM-23 Hawk
- MIM-104 Patriot
- RIM-7 Sea Sparrow
- SAMP/T
- ASRAAM
- V2X Tempest

=== Electronic warfare and communication ===
==== Radars ====
- P-14
- P-18 Terek
- P-19 Danube
- P-35 Saturn
- AN/TPQ-36 Firefinder
- AN/TPQ-48
- AN/TPQ-49 Forward Area Alerting Radar
- AN/MPQ-64 Sentinel
- SQUIRE
- COBRA
- ARTHUR
- Telefunken Radar Mobil Luftraumüberwachung-3D/4D
- Ground Master 200

==== Communications equipment ====
- SpaceX Starlink
- Clansman

==== Jamming equipment ====
- UAB EDM4S Sky Wiper
- Steelrock NightFighter
- NOTA

=== Vehicles ===
==== Tanks ====
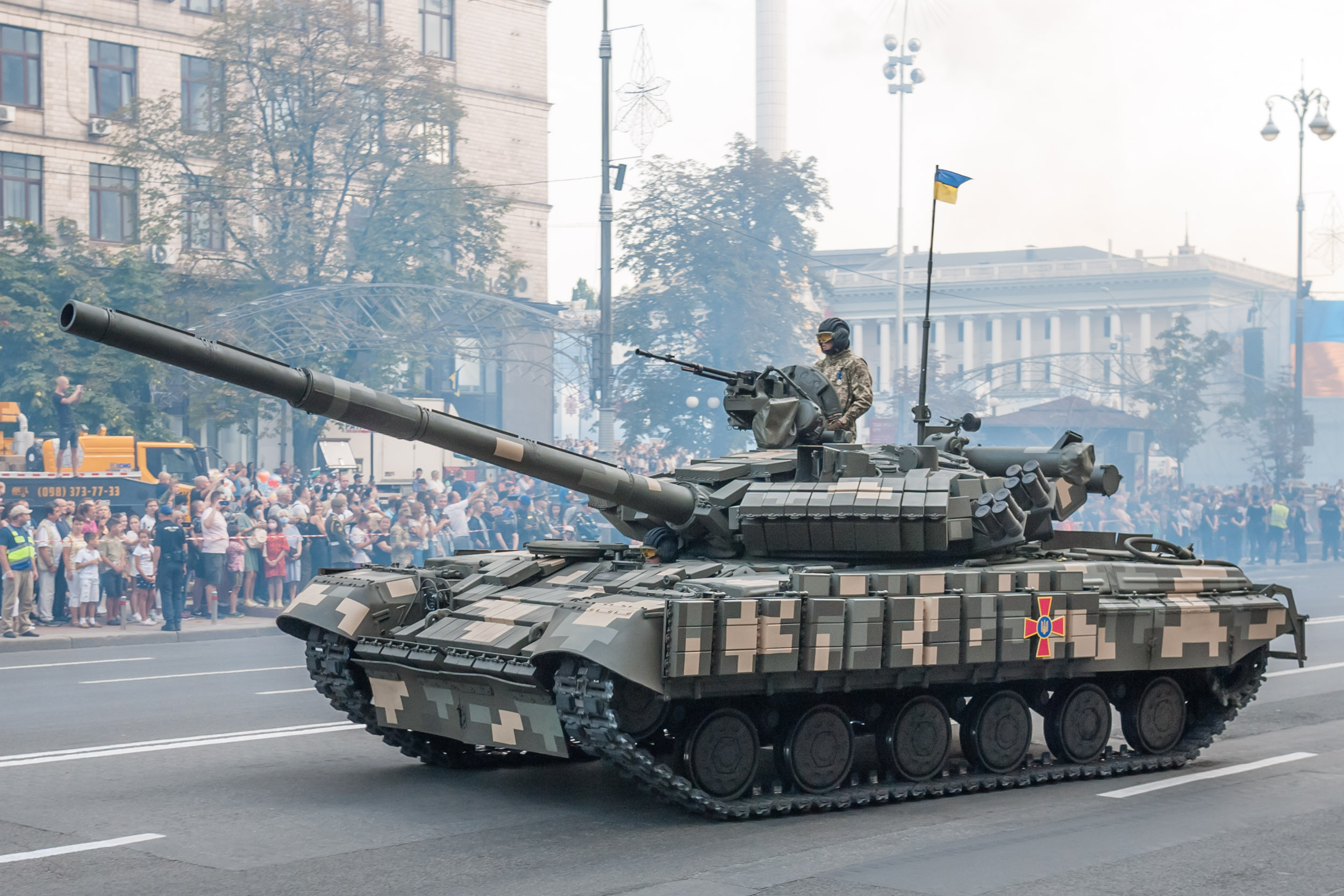
T-64 of the Ukrainian Ground Forces

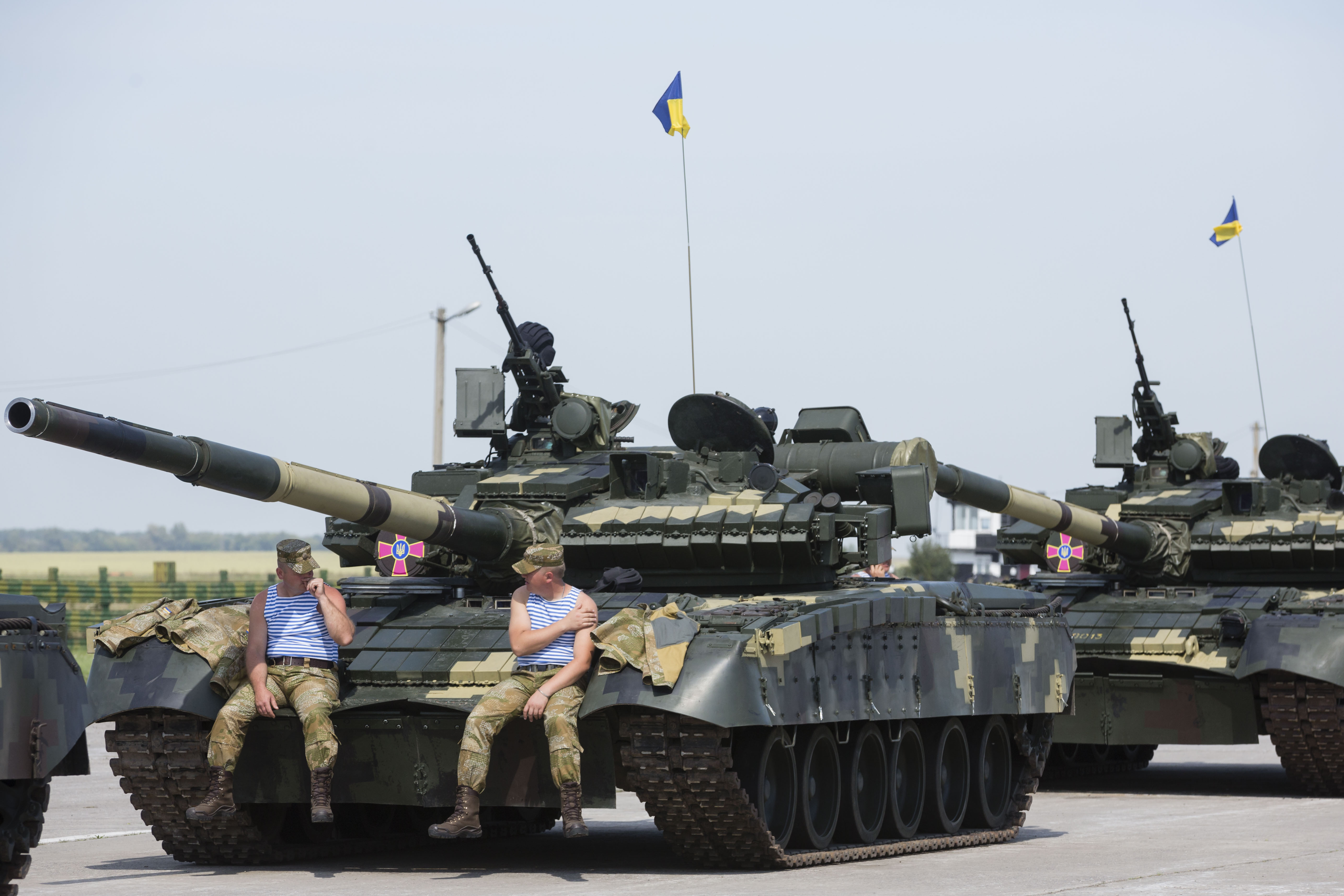
T-80 of the Ukrainian Ground Forces

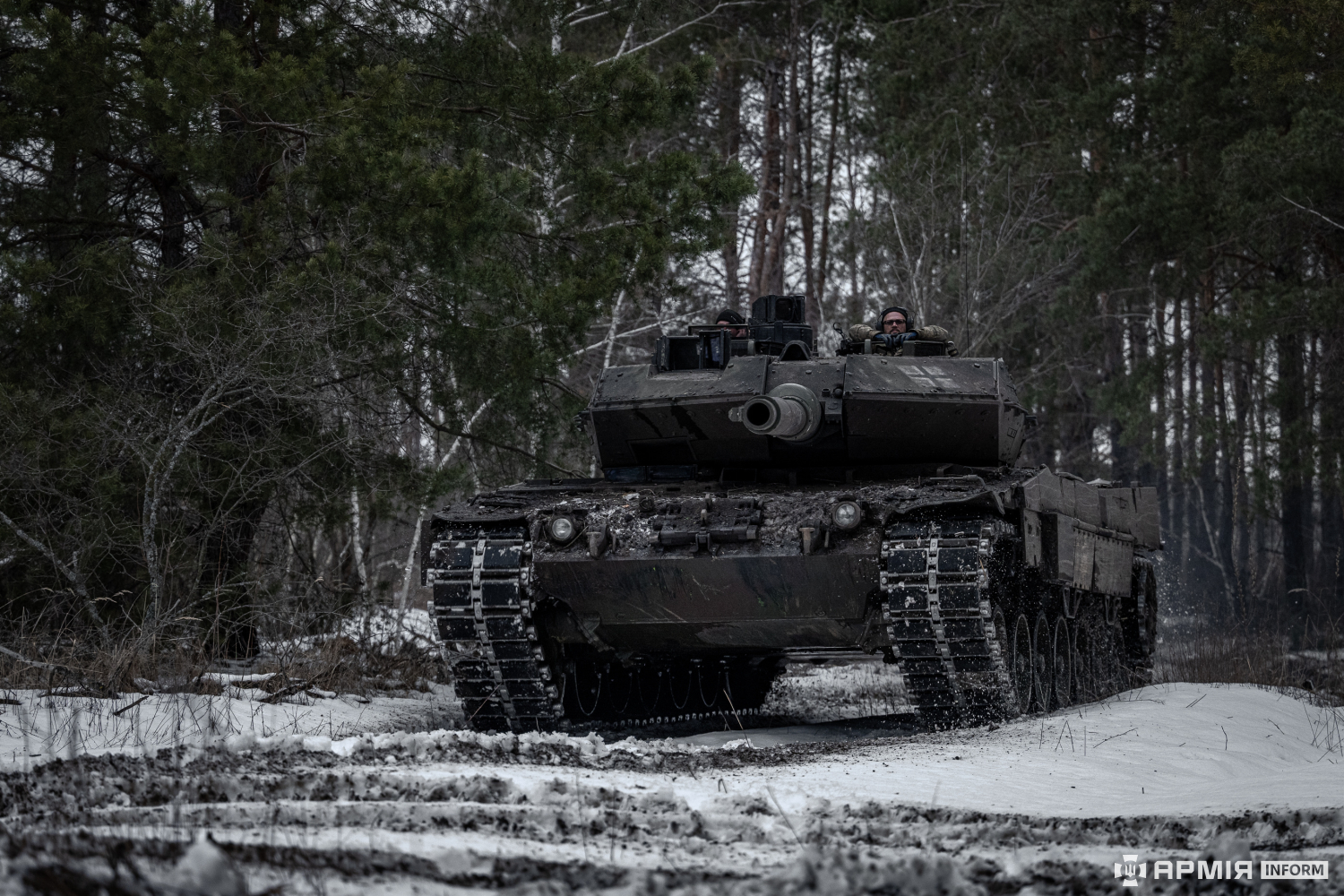
Leopard-2 of the Ukrainian Ground Forces

- M-55
- T-62
- T-64
- T-72
- T-80
- T-84
- T-90 (Captured)
- PT-91 Twardy
- Kampfpanzer Leopard 1
- Kampfpanzer Leopard 2
- Stridsvagn 122
- M1 Abrams
- Challenger 2

==== Tank destroyers ====
- AMX-10 Roues-Canon

==== Infantry fighting vehicles ====
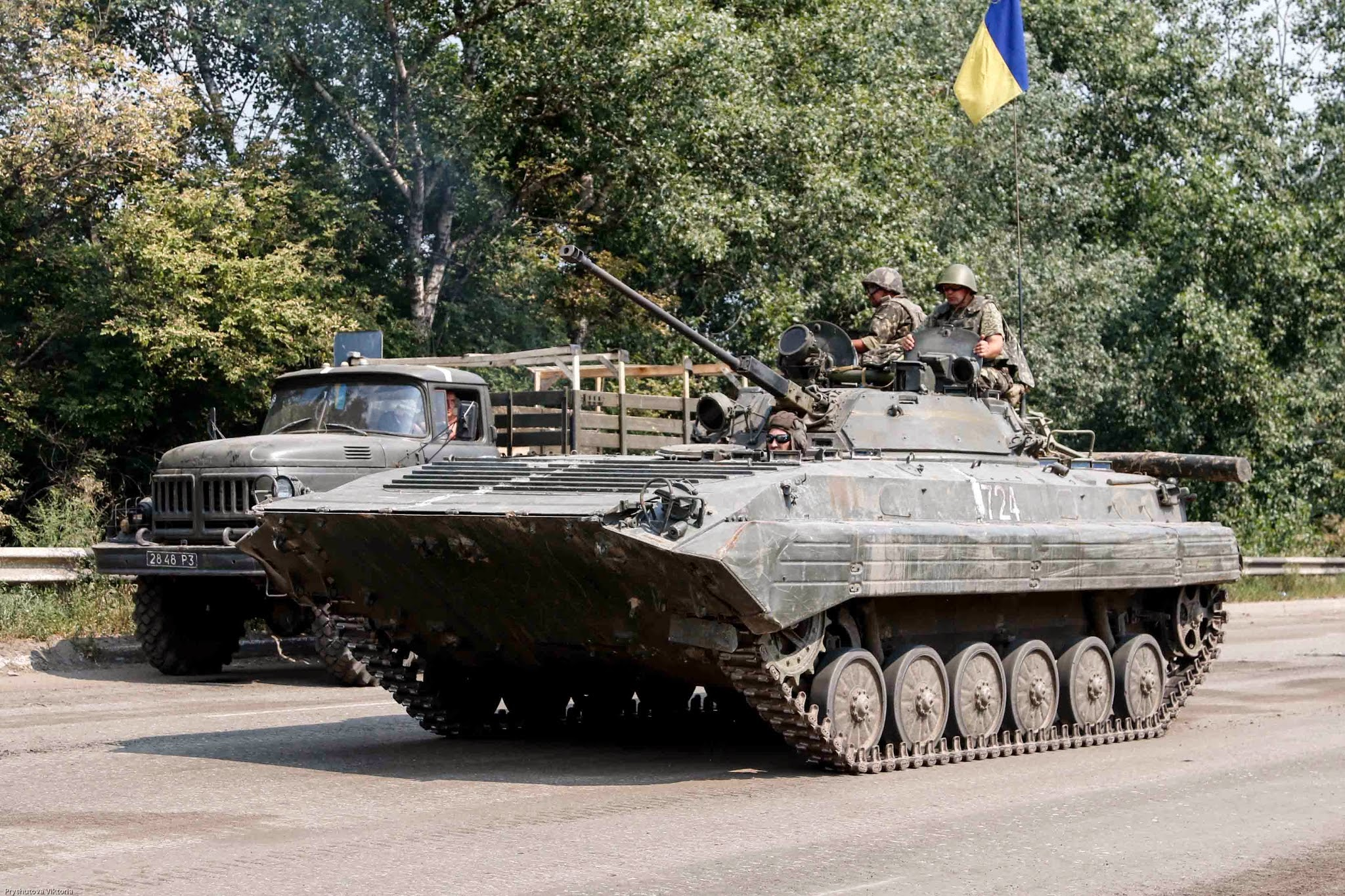
BMP-2 infantry fighting vehicle and ZIL-131 truck

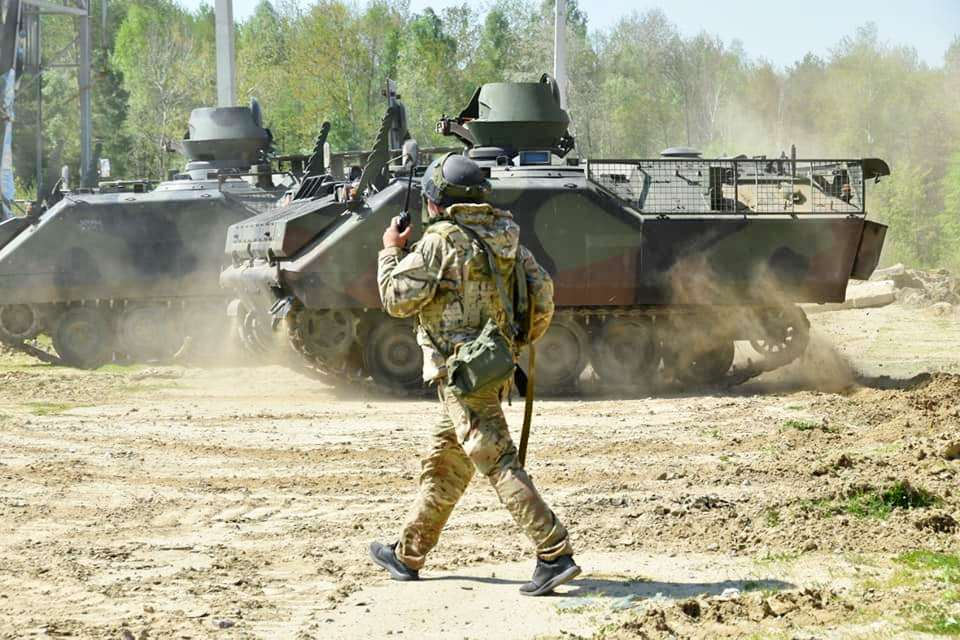
YPR-765 infantry fighting vehicles donated to Ukraine by the Netherlands. The YPR-765 is a Dutch derivative of the American M113 armoured personnel carrier.

- BMP-1
- BMP-2
- BMP-3
- BMD-1
- BMD-2
- BMD-4
- BTR-4 Bucephalus
- BVP M-80
- M2 Bradley
- Schützenpanzer Marder 1
- Combat Vehicle 90
- AMX-10P
- KTO Rosomak

==== Armored personnel carriers ====
- GT-MU
- MT-LB
- PTS
- BTR-60
- BTR-70
- BTR-80
- BTR-3 Hunter
- BTR-7 Defender
- BTR-D
- BTR-MDM Rakushka
- Vepr
- AT105 Saxon
- FV103 Spartan
- FV105 Sultan
- FV430 Bulldog
- M113 armored personnel carrier
- M577 command post carrier
- Véhicule de l'Avant Blindé
- Opal
- Oncilla
- LAV 6 armoured combat support vehicle
- Patria Pasi
- YPR-765
- M1126 Infantry Carrier Vehicle Stryker
- Pandur I
- Bandvagn 206

==== Scout and reconnaissance vehicles ====
- BRDM-2
- BRM-1K
- FV107 Scimitar
- FV701 Ferret
- Polaris Ranger
- VOLS Petliura

==== Infantry mobility vehicles ====
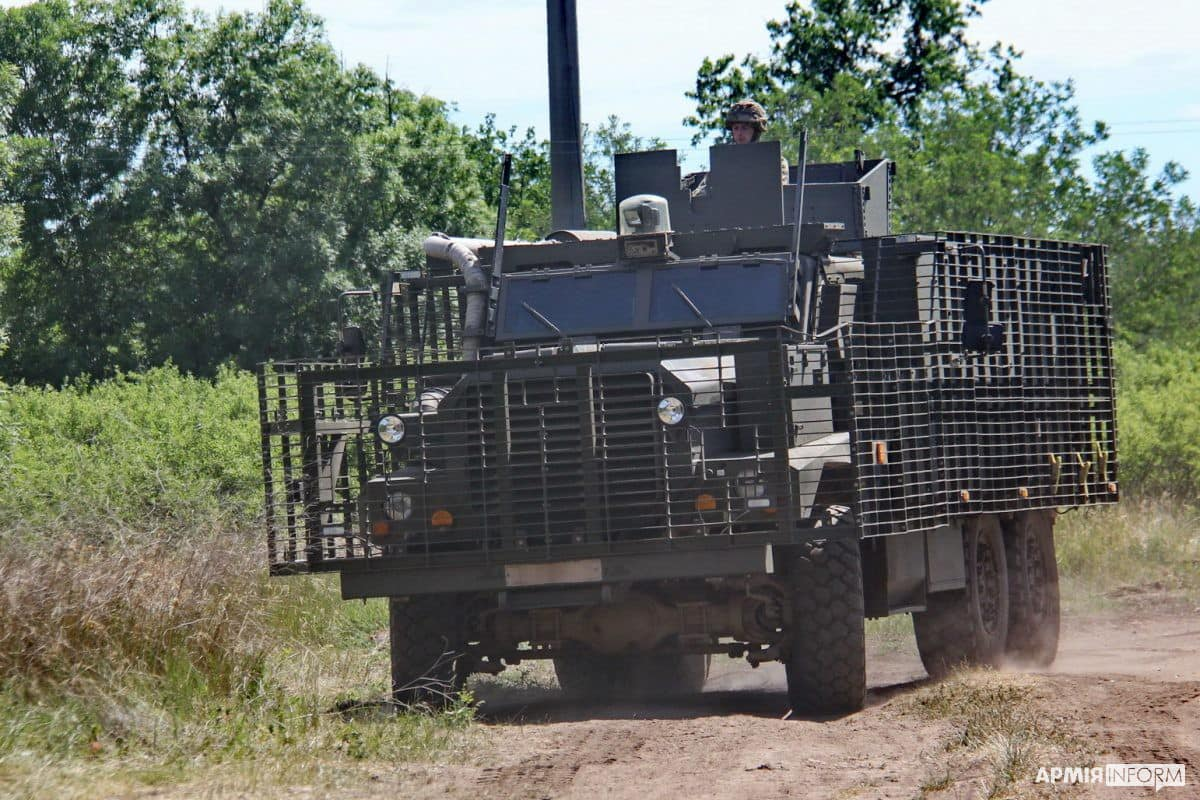
Mastiff

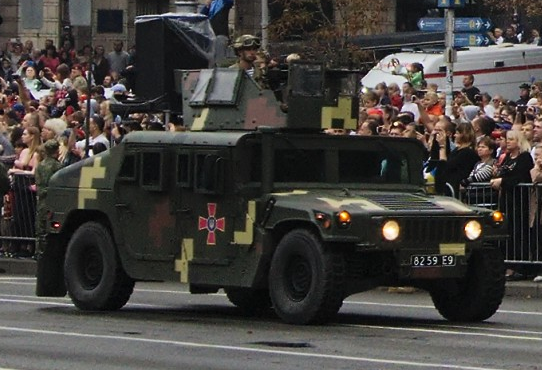
Humvee

- Roshel Senator
- Triton
- Kozak-2
- KrAZ Cobra
- STREIT Group Cougar
- KrAZ Shrek
- KrAZ Spartan
- Bogdan Bars-6
- Bogdan Bars-8
- Ukrainian Armor Novator
- Dozor-B
- Gadfly
- Bushmaster Protected Mobility Vehicle
- Iveco LMV
- Iveco VM 90
- AMZ Dzik
- Snatch Land Rover
- Alvis 4
- Mastiff
- Wolfhound
- Husky
- M998/M1025/M1097/M1114/M1116/M1152/M1167 high mobility multipurpose wheeled vehicle
- M1224 International MaxxPro mine resistant ambush protected
- M1280 joint light tactical vehicle
- M1117 armored security vehicle
- MLS Shield
- BMC Kirpi
- ATF Dingo
- GAIA Amir
- Inkas Titan-S
- GAZ Tigr (captured)
- Alvis Tactica
- Terradyne Gurkha
- Bandvagn 202
- Cougar
- KAMAZ Typhoon (captured)

==== Recovery and engineering vehicles ====
- BTS-4
- BREM-1
- BREM-2
- BREM-4K
- BREM-64
- BREM-84 Atlet
- BREM-Ch
- IRM
- RKhM Kashalot
- IMR-2
- MK-3
- MT-55
- MT-T
- MTO-AT
- MTU-12
- MTU-20
- MTU-72
- TMM-3
- GMZ-3
- MDK-2M
- UMP-350
- PMP
- UR-67
- UR-77
- VT-72B
- M58 mine-clearing line charge
- M88 recovery vehicle
- M984 wrecker
- M1089 wrecker
- FV106 Samson
- Brückenlegepanzer Biber
- Bergepanzer 2
- Bergepanzer 3 Büffel
- Pionierpanzer 2 Dachs
- Wisent 1
- Challenger armoured repair and recovery vehicle
- Minewolf MW240
- Armtrac 400
- GMC TopKick
- M1150 assault breacher vehicle

==== Utility and transport vehicles ====
- FV104 Samaritan
- RG-31 Nyala
- Bogdan-2251
- Argo 8x8
- HEP 70
- RMMV HX
- M113A4 armored medical evacuation vehicle
- M984 heavy expanded mobility tactical truck
- M992 field artillery ammunition support vehicle
- M1070 heavy equipment transporter
- M1083 medium tactical vehicle
- Ark
- Volvo N10

==== Unmanned ground vehicles ====
- Milrem Robotics THeMIS

=== Aircraft ===
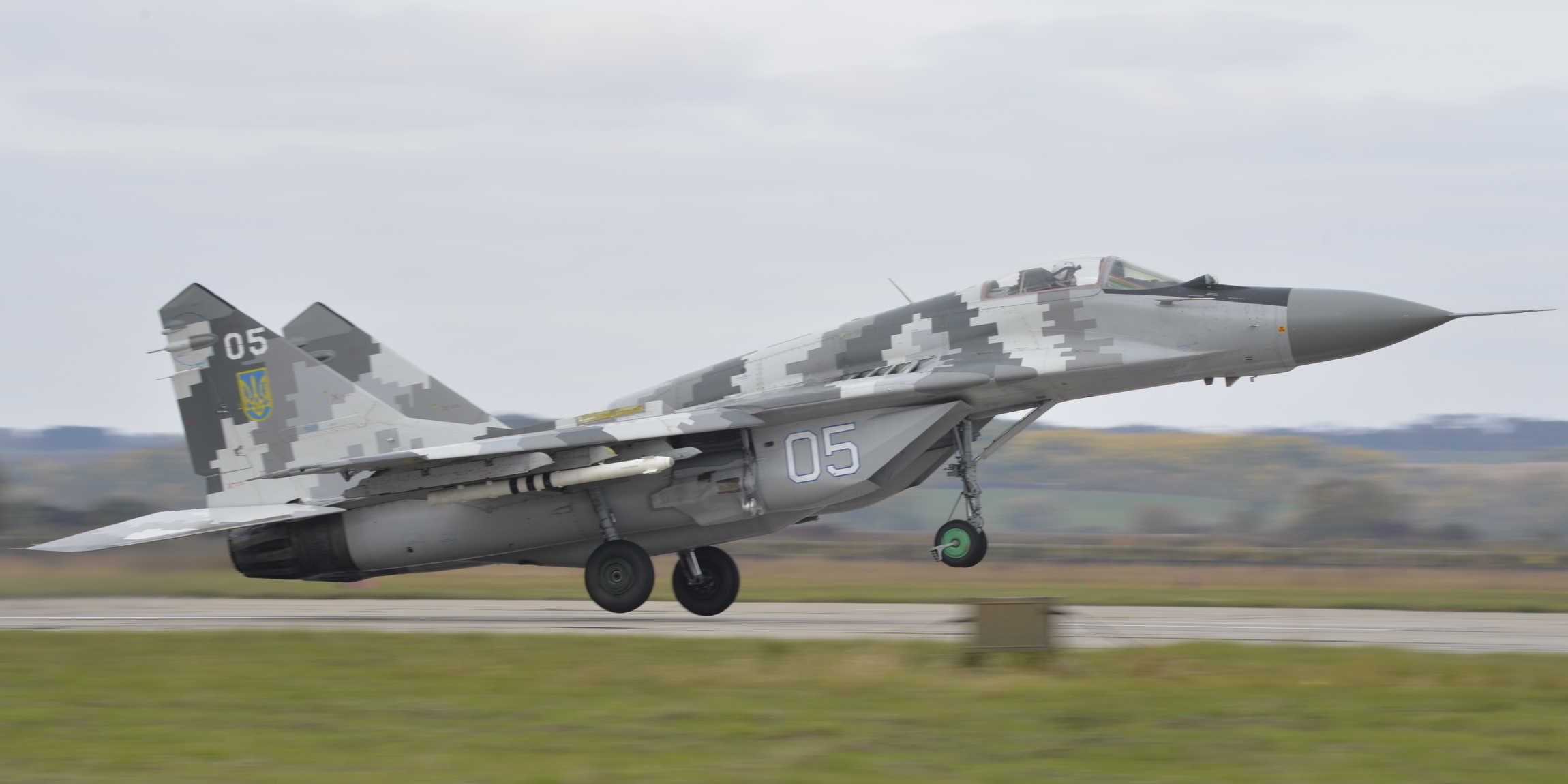
Mikoyan MiG-29

==== Fixed-wing ====
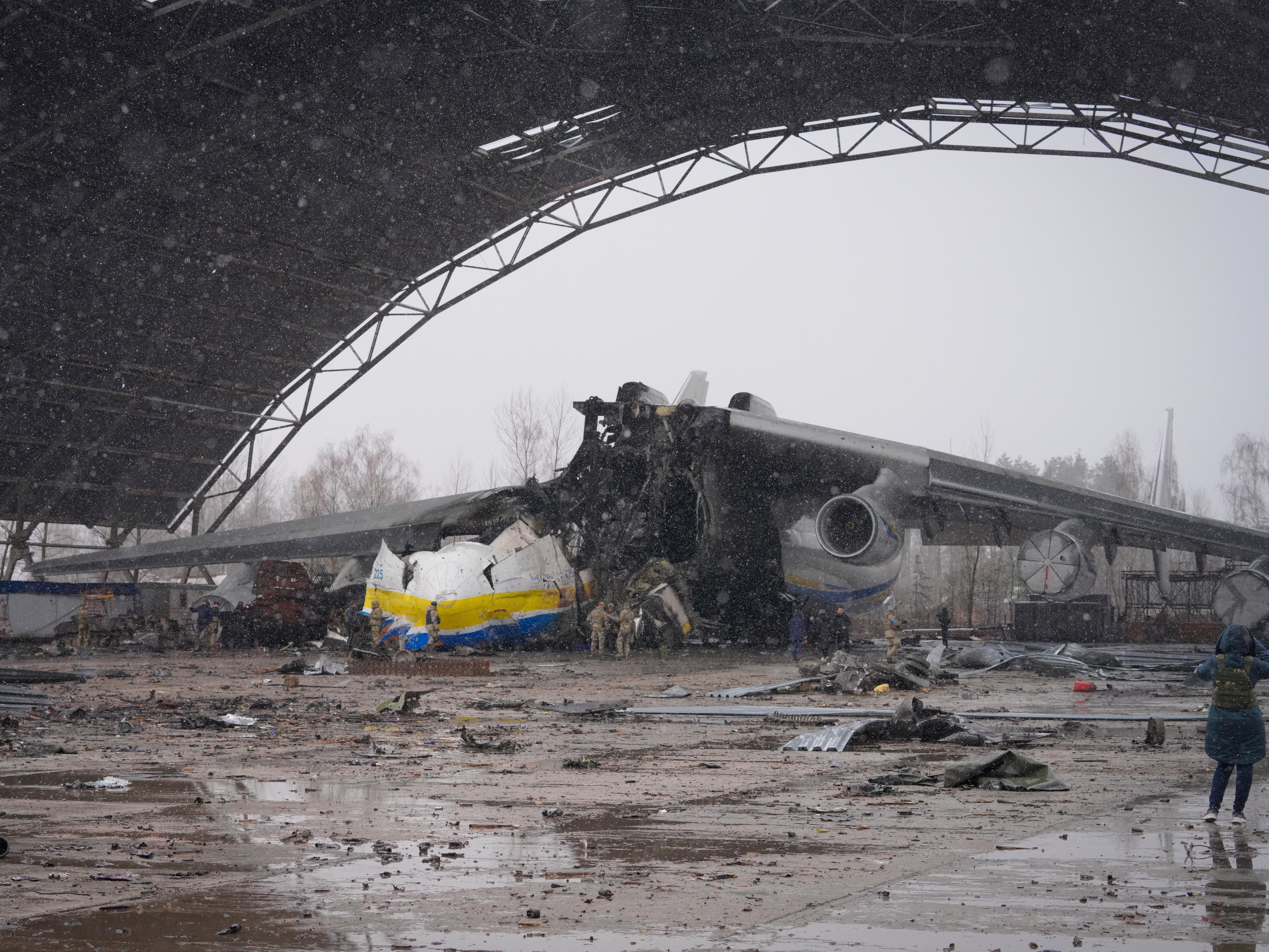
Destroyed Antonov An-225 at Hostomel Airport

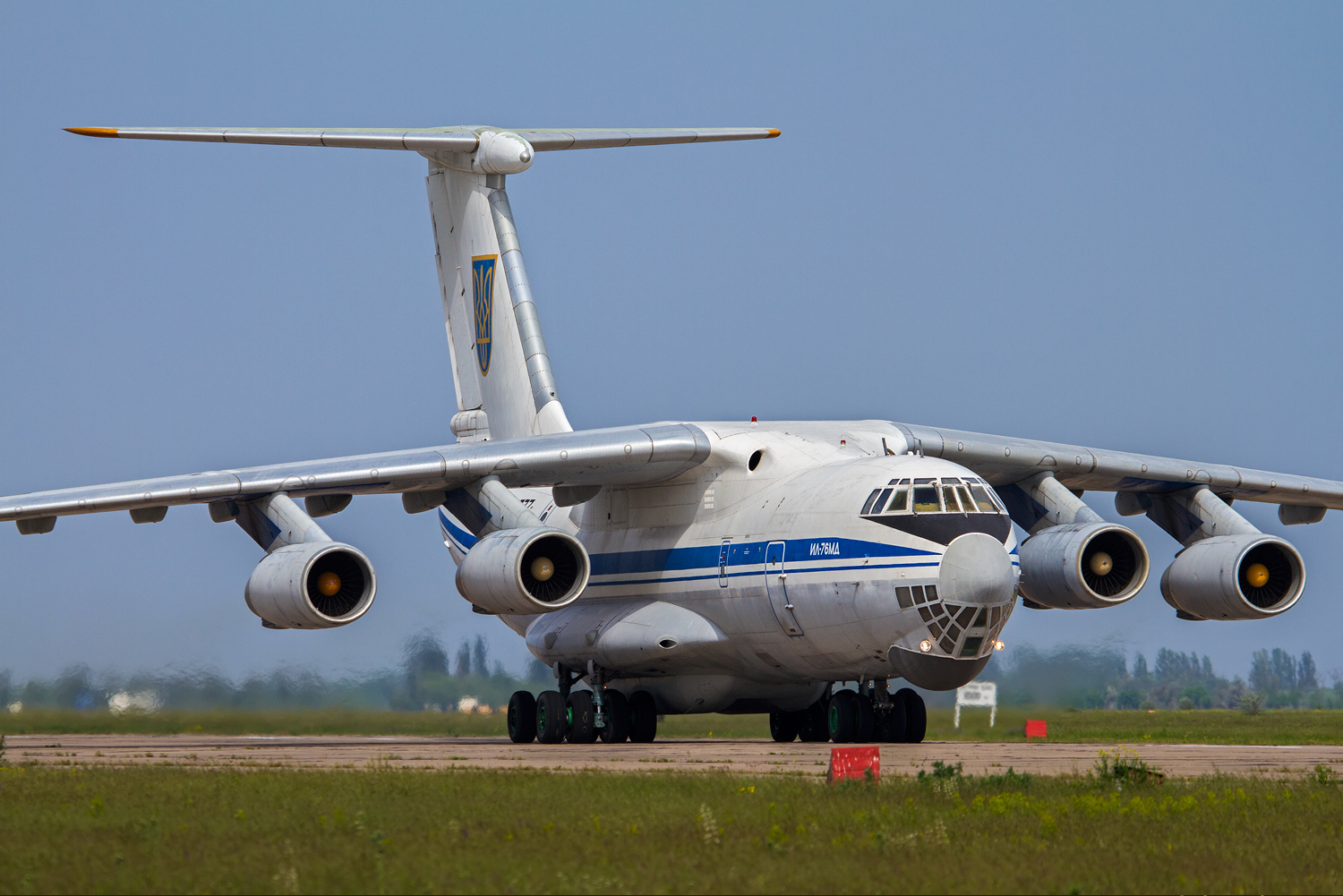
Ukrainian Air Force Ilyushin Il-76 at Kulbakino Air Base

- Aero L-39 Albatros
- Antonov An-2
- Antonov An-8
- Antonov An-24
- Antonov An-26
- Antonov An-30
- Antonov An-70
- Antonov An-72
- Antonov An-225
- Dassault Mirage 2000
- General Dynamics F-16 Fighting Falcon
- Ilyushin Il-76
- Mikoyan MiG-29
- Sukhoi Su-24
- Sukhoi Su-25
- Sukhoi Su-27
- Tupolev Tu-134

==== Rotary ====
- Mil Mi-2
- Mil Mi-8
- Mil Mi-14
- Mil Mi-17
- Mil Mi-24
- Messerschmitt-Bölkow-Blohm Bo 105
- Westland Sea King
- Airbus Helicopters H225

==== Unmanned aerial systems ====
===== Unmanned combat aerial vehicles =====
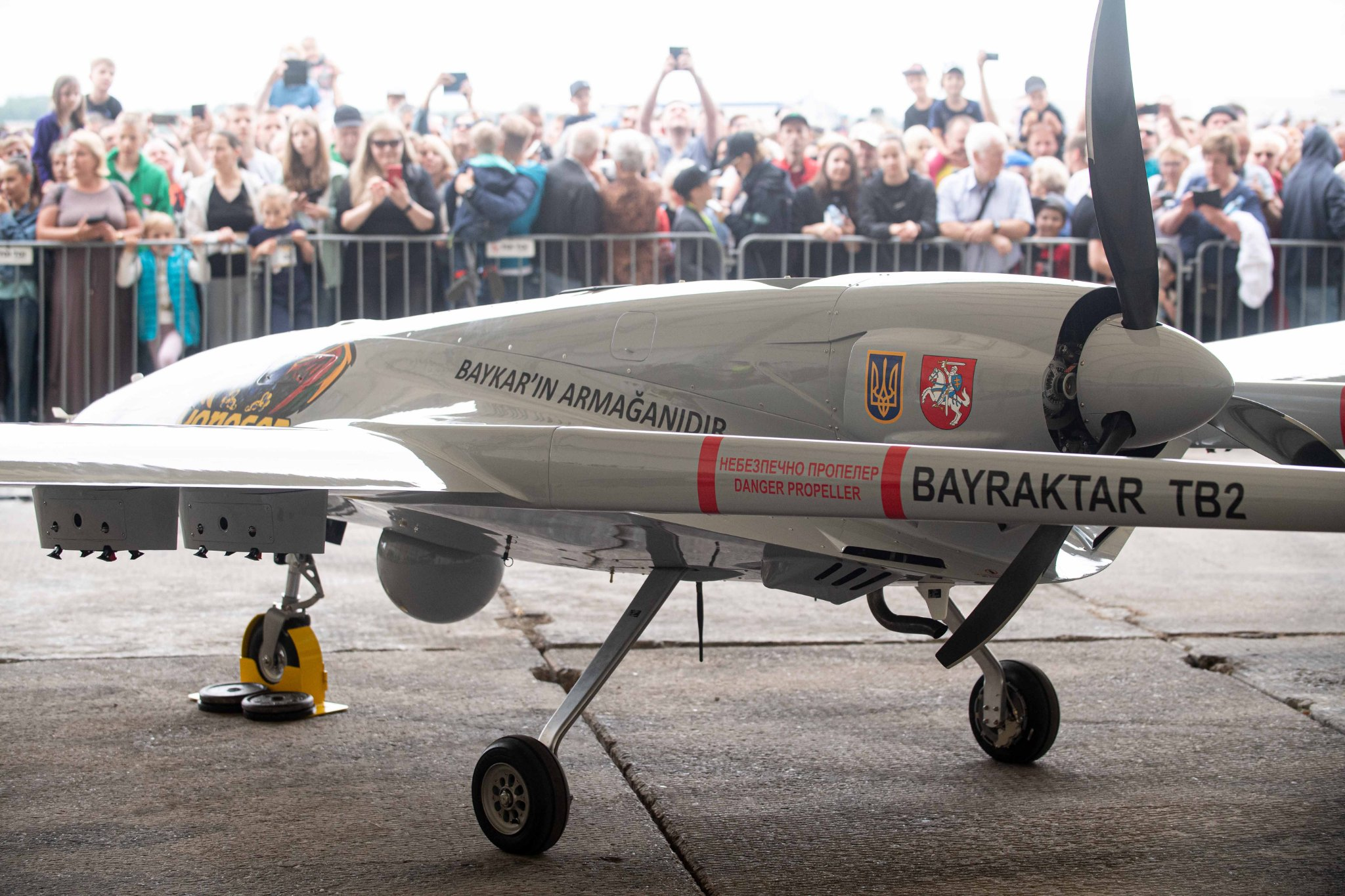
Baykar Bayraktar TB2

- Baykar Bayraktar TB2
- SkyEye 5000mm Pro UAV
- DronesVision Revolver 860

===== Reconnaissance drones =====
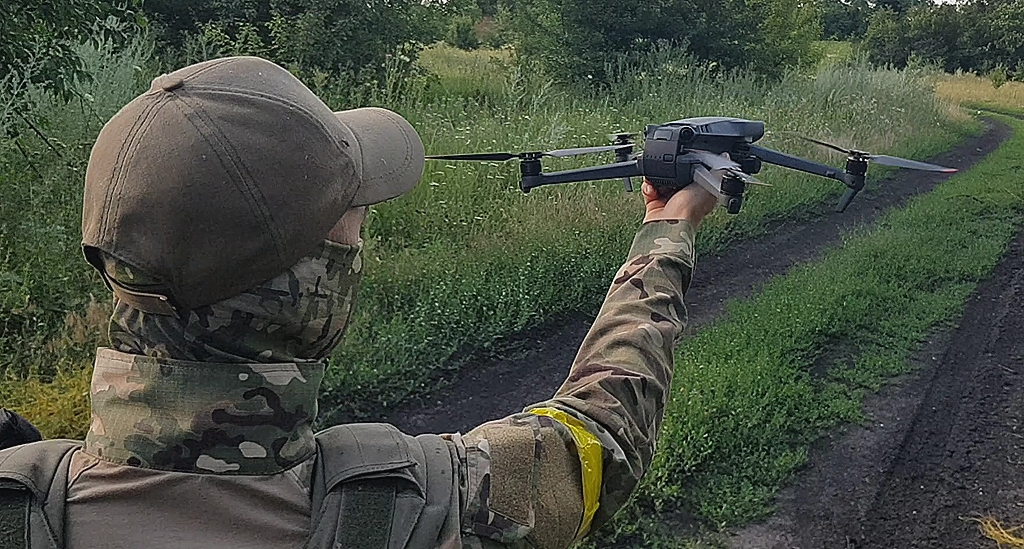
Ukrainian soldier with DJI Mavic 3 quadcopter

- Aeryon SkyRanger R60
- AeroVironment Quantix Recon
- Atlas Dynamics AtlasPRO
- RQ-11 Raven
- RQ-20 Puma
- MQ-27 ScanEagle
- Baykar Bayraktar Mini UAV
- IAI Bird-Eye
- WB Electronics FlyEye
- Sky-Watch Heidrun
- Tupolev Tu-141
- Tupolev Tu-143
- Ukrspecsystems PD-1
- Ukrspecsystems PD-2
- Leleka-100
- Ukrjet UJ-22 Airborne
- Ukrjet UJ-23 Topaz
- UA Dynamics Punisher
- Athlon Avia A1-CM Furia
- Spaitech Sparrow
- Spectator
- DJI Mavic 2
- DJI Mavic Air 2s
- DJI Mavic 3
- DJI Phantom 4
- DJI Matrice 300
- Brinc Lemur
- XDynamics Evolve 2
- Quantum Systems Vector
- Quantum Systems Scorpion
- EOS C VTOL
- Black Hornet Nano
- Parrot Anafi
- Autel EVO II
- Primoco One 150
- Shark
- Orlik
- UAV Factory Penguin C

===== Loitering munitions =====
- AN-196 Liutyi
- UJ-25 Skyline
- UJ-26 Bober
- AQ-400 Scythe
- FP-1 (UAV)
- AeroVironment Switchblade 300
- AeroVironment Switchblade 600
- Phoenix Ghost
- WB Electronics Warmate
- Ukrjet UJ-31 Zlyva
- Ukrjet UJ-32 Lastivka
- Athlon Avia ST-35 Silent Thunder
- DefendTex D40
- DJI FPV
- Sting

===== Delivery drones =====
- Malloy Aeronautics T150

=== Ships ===
==== Submarines ====
- Project 641 [Foxtrot-class] (Zaporizhzhia). (captured)

==== Frigates ====
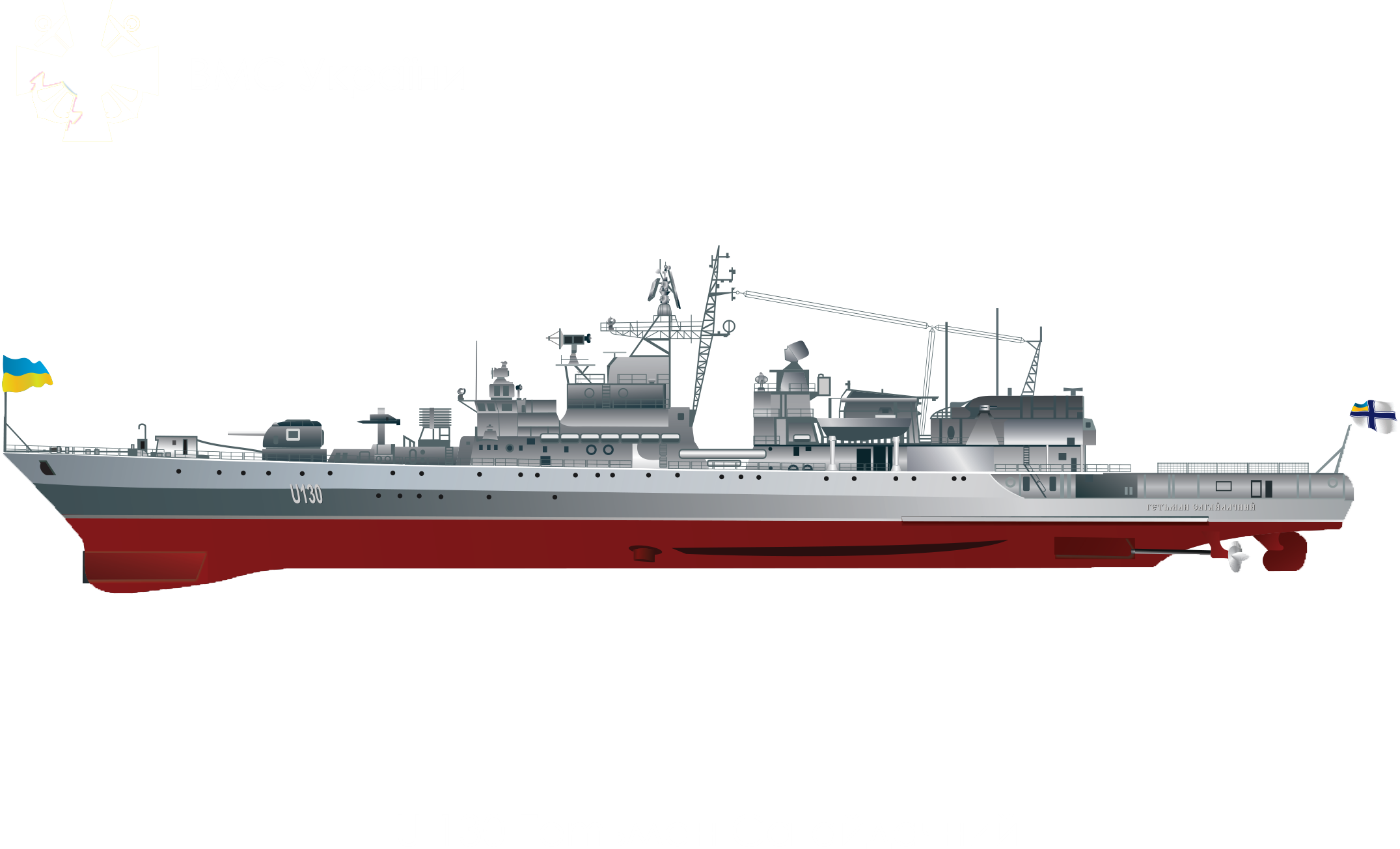
Project 1135 Hetman Sahaidachny

- Project 1135 [Krivak-class] (Hetman Sahaidachny). Scuttled

==== Corvettes ====
- Project 1124 [Grisha-class] (Lutsk (captured), Vinnytsia (sunk in port),Ternopil (captured))
- Project 1241.2 Molniya-2 [Pauk-class] (Uzhhorod, Khmelnytskyi (captured), Hryhoriy Hnatenko, Poltava)
- Project 1241 Molniya [Tarantul-class] (Prydniprov'ya (captured), Kremenchuk)
- Project 11451 Sokol [Mukha-class] (Lviv, Luhansk)

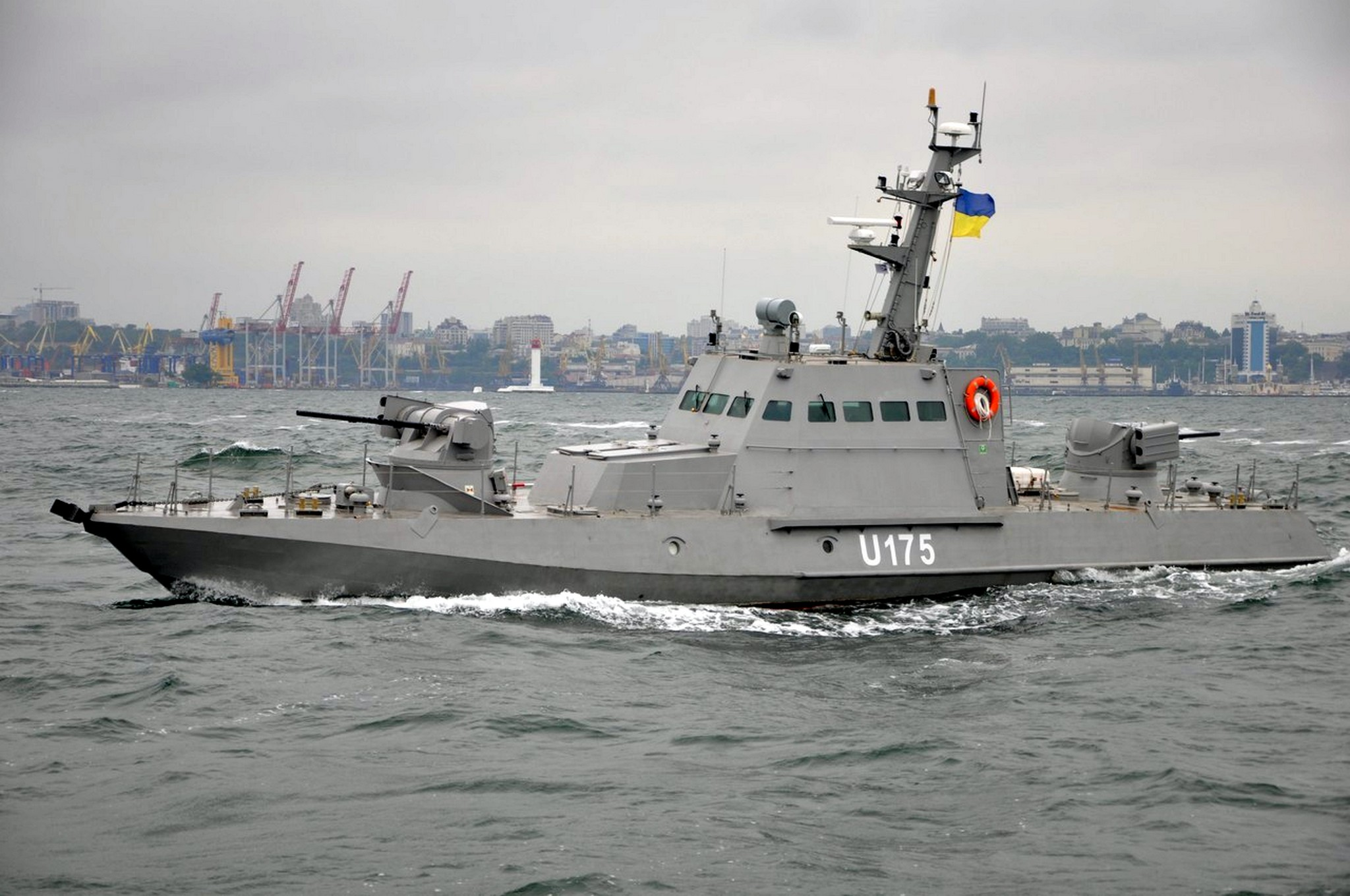
Berdiansk in the Black Sea near Odesa

==== Fast attack craft ====
- Project 206MR [Matka-class] (Kakhovka)
- Project 1388N [Shelon-class] (Kherson)
- Project 205P Tarantul [Stenka-class] (Bukovyna, Donbas)

==== Patrol vessels ====
- Project 745P [Sorum-class] (Korets). Captured.
- Project 58160 [Koral-class]
- Island-class (Sloviansk). Sunk in action.
- Project 58155 [Gyurza-M-class] (Akkerman (captured), Vyshhorod (captured), Kremenchuk (sunk in port), Lubny)
- Project 1400M [Zhuk-class] (Obolon, KaMO-521, KaMO-527 (sunk in port), Arabat (captured), KaMO-517)
- Project 14670 [Gurzuf-class] (Lviv, Kryvyi Rih)
- Project RV376U [PO-2-class] (RK-796)
- Project 13432 Volga (head numbers: 8203, 8305, 8306, 8402)
- Project R1415 [Flamingo-class] (Feodosiya)
- Project 09104 [Kalkan-P-class] (BG-09, BG-11)
- Project 50030 [Kalkan-class] (BG-504, BG-304, BG-308, BG-310, BG-311, BG-304, BG-309)
- Katran-class (BG-820)
- UMS 1000-class (BG-18, BG-14, BG-24, BG-22, BG-23)
- Project 14720 [Hvilya-class]
- UMS 600-class (BG-721)

==== Amphibious warfare ships ====
- Project 775 [Ropucha-class] (Konstantin Olshanskiy). Captured.
- Project 1232.2 Zubr [Pomornik-class] (Horlivka)
- Project 1176 [Ondatra-class] (Svatovo)
- Project 58503 Kentavr-LK [Centaur-LK-class] (Stanislav). Sunk in action.

==== Mine warfare ships ====
- Project 1258 [Yevgenya-class] (Henichesk). Sunk in action.
- Project 266M Akvamarin [Natya-class] (Chernihiv, Cherkasy). Captured.
- Project 1265 Yakhont [Sonya-class] (Mariupol, Melitopol)

==== Special-purpose RIBs ====
- BRIG Navigator N730M-class
- BRIG Navigator N700M-class (BG-40)
- Willard Sea Force 540/7M/11M-class
- Heavy Duty 460-class
- Brig Eagle 6-class

==== Auxiliary vessels ====
- Omar-class (Langust)
- Type Ryf (Ryf)
- Project 1825 [Type Sever-2] (Sever-2)
- Project 1605 [Tethys-class] (BK-89-01, BK-72-05)
- Agent-1-class (Agent-1)
- MTK-200-class
- [No formal type or project number] explosive/reconnaissance drone boat (head no. 45V2NS1)
- Project 1844 [Toplivo-class] (Bakhmach)
- Project 1823/1824B [Muna-class] (Dzhankoi, Pereyaslav)
- Project 861 [Moma-class] (Simferopol)
- Project 522 [Niryat-class] (Vilnohirsk)
- Project 304 [Amur-class] (Donbas). Sunk in port.
- Project 12884 [Bammbuk-class] (Slavutych). Captured.
- Project 714 [Goryn-class] (Kremenets)
- Project 1896 [Niryat II-class] (Skvyra)
- Project 1462 [Rubin-class] (Dmitry Chubar). Captured.
- Project 16830 Drofa (MGK-1694, MGK-1889)
- Project 737M [Sidehole-class] (Dubno)
- Project 254K [T43-class] (Velikaya Alexandrovka)
- Project R1415 [Flamingo-class] (RK-1935, Konotop)
- Project 376 [PO-2-class] (RVK-761, Delfin, RK-1931, U926)
- Project 371 (RK-1362, U002)
- Project 1394A (RK-603)
- Type Conrad-900 Aramis (RK-1695)
- Project 1390 Strizh (RK-735)
- Adamant 315-class (BG-732)
- Galia-280-class
- Type Cetus-136R (Hermes)
- Type Alkor (Fiolent)
- Type Tallinn 1/4 ton (Antika, Lira, Spray)
- Type Conrad-25RT (Yunona)
- Baba Hasan-class (Onyx)
- GTI SE 155 Sea-Doo-class
- Project 1784 (SM-15)
- Project 50150 [Nalim-class] (Nalim (project 50150))
- Project 1526 (Novgorod-Siversky)
- Project 14630 (MUS-482)
- Project 1758 (PD-51)
- Project 889 (PMR-152)
- Project 771 (Kalanchak)

==== Ground Forces' Towing and Motor Boats ====
- BMK-150
- BMK-130

=== Ordnance ===
==== Small arms ammunition ====
- 5.45×18mm MPTs
- 5.45×39mm Soviet
- 5.56×45mm NATO
- .22 Long Rifle
- 7.62×25mm Tokarev
- 7.62×39mm Soviet
- 7.62×51mm NATO
- 7.62×54mmR Russian
- .308 Winchester
- .338 Lapua Magnum
- 9×18mm Makarov
- 9×19mm Parabellum
- 9×39mm Soviet
- 12.7×99mm NATO
- 12.7×108mm Soviet
- 14.5×114mm Soviet
- 23×75mmR Soviet
- 12 gauge

==== Recoilless gun projectiles ====
- PG-9

==== Mortar shells ====
- O-832DU
- M68P1
- JVA 1571

==== Artillery shells ====
- 155 BONUS
- M107 155mm projectile
- M549 155mm projectile
- M718 155mm Remote Anti-Armor Mine System
- M795 155mm projectile
- M982 155mm Excalibur

==== Air-to-air missiles ====
- R-27 (Mikoyan MiG-29, Sukhoi Su-27)
- R-73 (Mikoyan MiG-29, Sukhoi Su-27)
- Cirit (Mil Mi-8)
- UMTAS (Mil Mi-8, Baykar Bayraktar TB-2)
- MAM (Baykar Bayraktar TB-2)
- AIM-9 Sidewinder
- AIM-120 AMRAAM
- R.550 Magic
- MICA

==== Air-to-surface missiles ====
- AGM-88 High-speed Anti-Radiation Missile (Mikoyan MiG-29)
- Storm Shadow
- Scalp EG

==== Surface-to-air missiles ====
- Martlet

==== Surface-to-surface missiles ====
- OTR-21 Tochka
- R-360 Neptune
- FP-5 Flamingo
- AGM-114 Hellfire
- RBS-17
- Brimstone
- RGM-84 Harpoon
- MGM-140 ATACMS
- Ground Launched Small Diameter Bomb

==== Air-to-surface rockets ====
- Zuni 5-inch Folding-Fin Aircraft Rocket

==== Guidance kits ====
- Joint Direct Attack Munition
- Advanced Precision Kill Weapon System

==== Guided bombs ====
- Equalizer (or Leveler) - a Ukrainian designed and made precision-guided munition, guided bomb, and glide bomb, intended to be cheaper than Joint Direct Attack Munition kits and domestically produced.

== See also ==
Ground Forces

- List of equipment of the Russian Ground Forces
- List of equipment of the Ukrainian Ground Forces

Naval Forces

- List of active Russian Navy Ships
- List of active Ukrainian Navy Ships

Air Forces

- List of active Russian Air Force aircraft
- List of active Ukrainian Air Force aircraft
