= 422nd Unmanned Systems Regiment (Ukraine) =

422nd Unmanned Systems "Luftwaffe" Regiment
- Ukrainian: 422 Окремий Полк Безпілотних Систем “Люфтваффе”
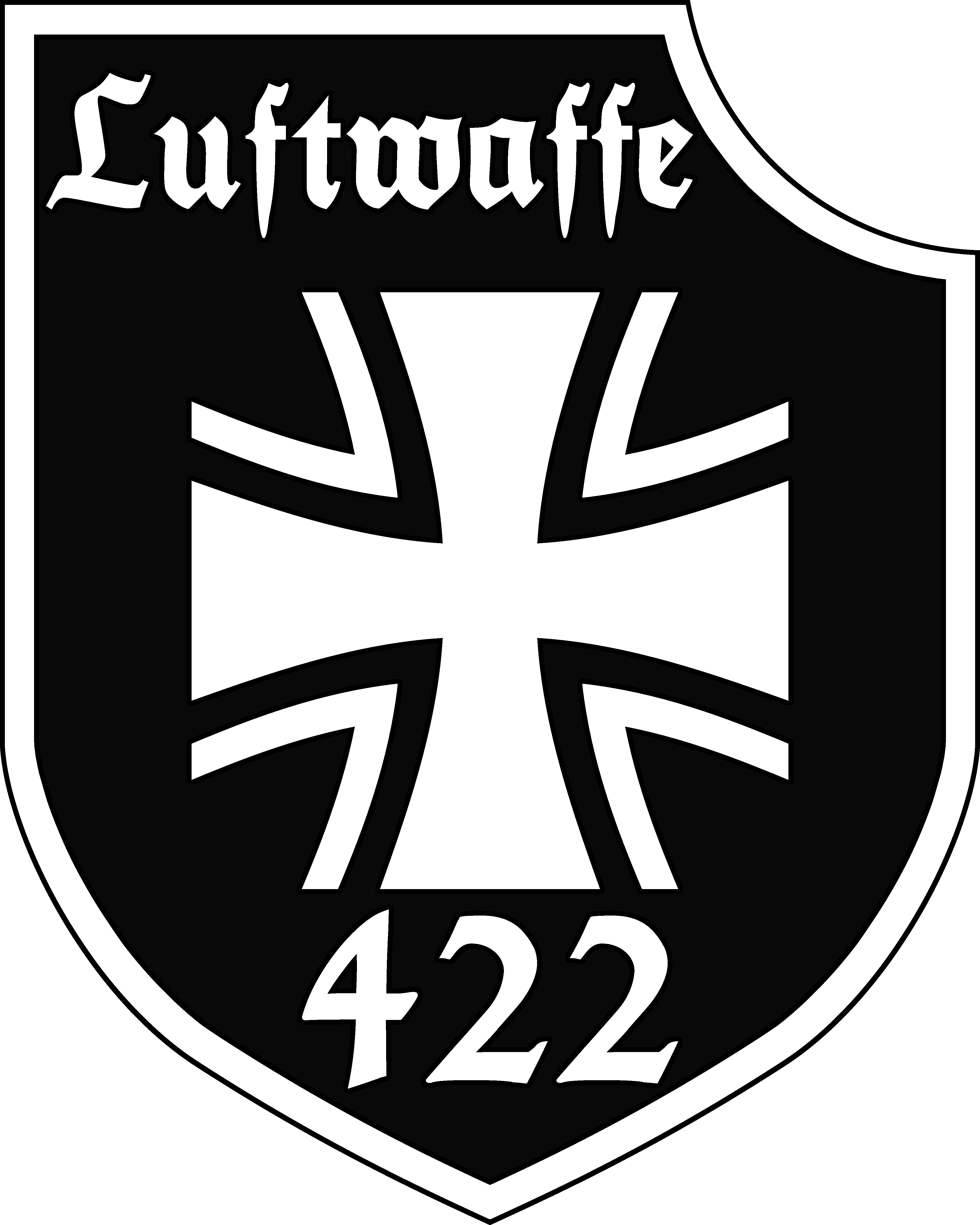
- Insignia
- Active: 2022–present
- Country: Ukraine
- Allegiance: Armed Forces of Ukraine
- Branch: Ukrainian Ground Forces
- Type: Unmanned Systems Forces
- Role: Aerial Reconnaissance, Drone Warfare, FPV drone strikes, Ground Drone Warfare, Cargo Transport
- Size: Regiment
- Part of: 17th Army Corps
- Garrison/HQ: Kryvyi Rih
- Engagements: Russo-Ukrainian war; 2022 Russian invasion of Ukraine

Commanders
- Current commander: Major Mykola Kolesnyk "Tyson"

Insignia
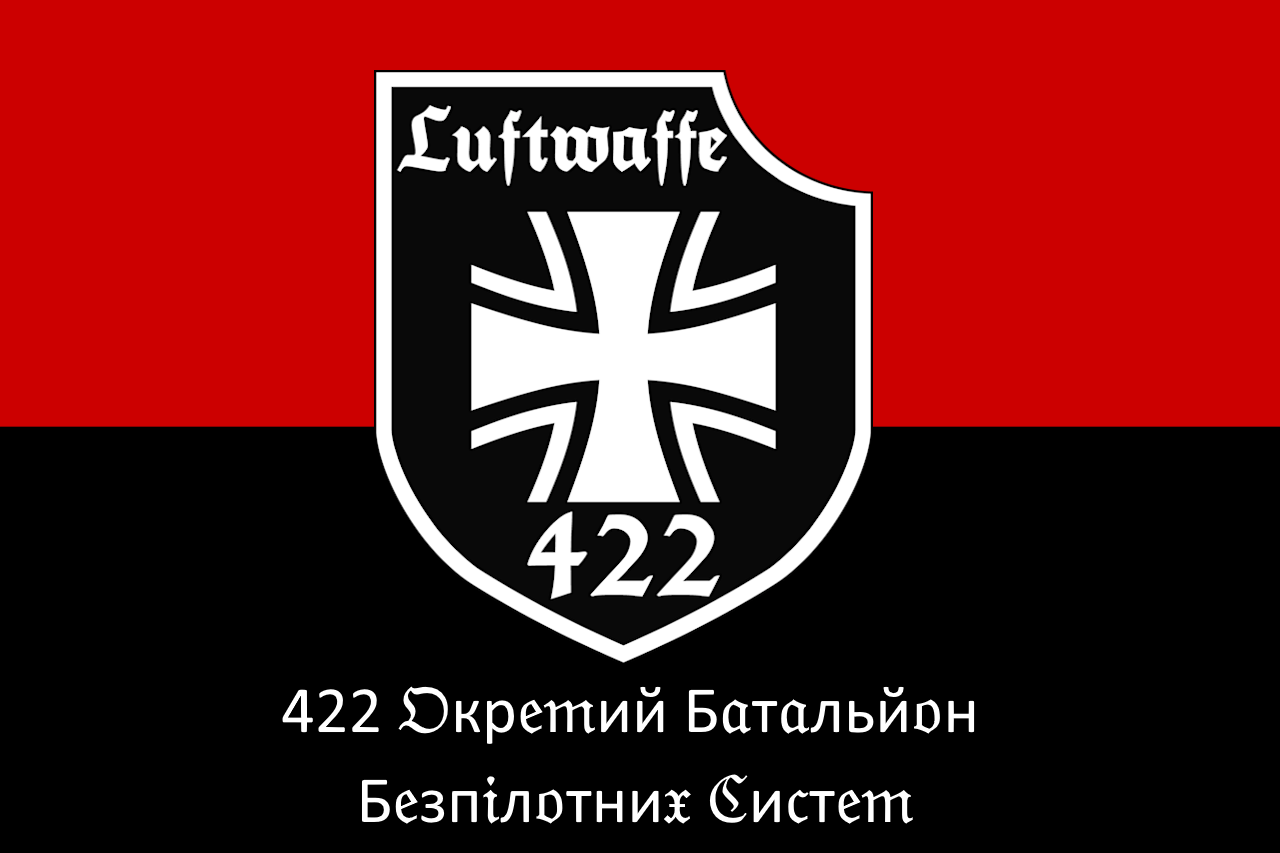
- Flag

The 422nd Unmanned Systems "Luftwaffe" Regiment (MUN A5047), formerly the 129th "Luftwaffe" Unmanned Systems Platoon of the Reconnaissance Company of the 129th Heavy Mechanized Brigade is a regiment level military unit of the Ukrainian Ground Forces, concerned with drone warfare using aerial and ground unmanned vehicles. It was established in 2022 at the start of the Russian invasion of Ukraine and has seen heavy action. It is a part of the 17th Army Corps.

== History ==
It was established at the start of the full-scale Russian invasion of Ukraine as the 129th "Luftwaffe" Unmanned Systems Batallion of the 129th Heavy Mechanized Brigade, formed mostly of civilian volunteers. At the end of February 2022, volunteers with quadcopters came under the commander in Kryvyi Rih, using drones from TV stations, private DJI Mavic-1 of a musician turned soldier of the unit and later received donated DJI Mavic-2 and Leleka-100 drones. Its first mission was breaking up Russian columns moving from Bashtanka, splitting the force, a part of which was intercepted by the 80th Airborne Brigade and the other towards Kryvyi Rih. It saw heavy operation in the city of Ingulets and the village of Tykhy Stav. Its forces came 300 meters close to a column of six Russian IFVs and coordinated with the 17th Tank Brigade to destroy the convoy. It conducted aerial reconnaissance in southern Ukraine and participated in the 2022 Kherson counteroffensive, during which its forces were ambushed by T-90 tanks and also saw action in Donbas and Zaporizhzhia. It had, as of July 2024, successfully destroyed several Russian air defense systems including Buk M1, Tor missile system, Pantsir-S1, 9K33 Osa, 9K35 Strela-10, 2K22 Tunguska and EW installations, such as Borisoglebsk-2, R-330Zh Zhitel, Polye-21, Lyer-3 as well as MLRSs including the BM-27 Uragan and BM-21 Grad. Additionally Zoopark-1 counter-battery artillery radar and Msta-S self-propelled artillery. Its reconnaissance unit detected almost 4,000 targets and destroyed 300 while its strike group destroyed more than 500 targets. Its forces were using Athlon Avia A1-CM Furia and Leleka-100 drones when the commander of Operational Command South visited its positions. Two Russian "Superkami" and two STC Orlan-10 drones discovered its positions and bombarded it using cluster from BM-27 Uragan, but the Furia operators were able to evacuate unscathed. Its forces found an artillery piece with several containers of ammunition, directed an artillery strikes and destroyed it in a major explosion. On 19 July 2024, Zaporozhia Regional Administration handed over 83 Synytsia EW systems, 100 thermal imaging and 50 night vision monoculars, 60 DJI Mavic 3 quadcopters of which 30 were equipped with thermal imaging while 30 were equipped with daytime optics, 70 Motorola radio stations, 34 laptops and 200 remote antennas.

On 31 July 2024, it was expanded to the 422nd Unmanned Systems "Luftwaffe" Battalion of the 17th Army Corps. In July 2024, it discovered a major gathering of Russian personnel and equipment at a training ground in Zaporizhzhia Oblast, which was later destroyed on 9 August by cluster munitions. On 22 August 2024, a soldier of the regiment (Shulzhenko Yevheny Oleksandrovych) died off-duty by a cardiac arrest, caused due to partaking in excessive combat. In October 2024, it was fighting in Zaporizhzhia Oblast. In March 2025, it started a recruitment campaign. Also in March 2025, it struck Russian forces destroying personnel and equipment. On 13 June 2025, it inflicted heavy losses on Russian forces including the destruction of personnel, vehicles and equipment. On 2 August 2025, a soldier of the battalion (Roman Basaraba) died from wounds sustained in combat. On 14 August 2025, it discovered Russian forces looting grain of the new harvest from Zaporizhzhia Oblast.

On 11 Jan 2026, it was announced on the unit's official social media platforms that 422nd had been expanded into a regiment. The regiment has continued to perform combat missions in the Zaporizhzhia direction.

== Structure ==
Unit Headquarters

- Armagedron Strike Group
- Intelligence unit "Sparta"
- Company "Luftwaffe Old"
- Electronic Warfare
- Technical Support and Repair Departments
- Logistics Departments
- Special Units

== Commanders ==
- Mykola Kolesnyk "Tyson" (2022-)

== Equipment ==
Model	Image	Origin	Type	Number	Notes
Unmanned Aerial Vehicles
Leleka-100		Ukraine	Loitering munition/Aerial Reconnaissance Drone		
Athlon Avia A1-CM Furia		Ukraine	Aerial Reconnaissance Drone		
Chaklun		Ukraine	Loitering munition/Aerial Reconnaissance Drone		
H10 Poseidon Mk III		Ukraine	Aerial Reconnaissance Drone		
DJI Mavic 1/2/3		China	FPV quadcopter		
Autel 4N		China	FPV quadcopter		
Interceptor		Ukraine	Counterdrone Drone		
