= 9K33 Osa =

Vehicle-launched surface-to-air missile system

9K33 Osa (NATO reporting name: SA-8 Gecko, SA-N-4 Gecko)
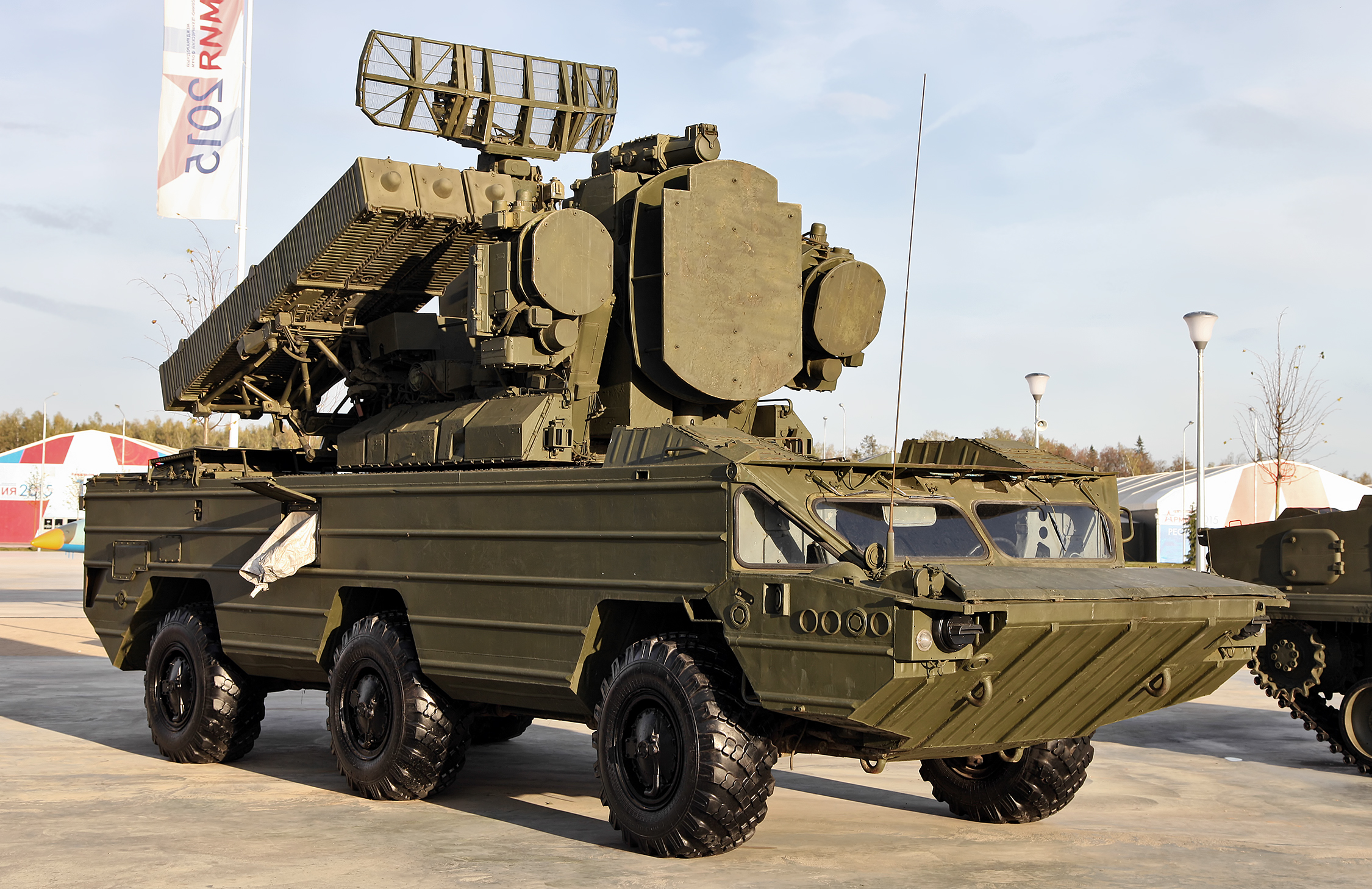
- 9A33BM3 transporter-launcher and radar vehicle of the upgraded 9K33M3 Osa-AKM.
- Type: 6×6 amphibious SAM system
- Place of origin: Soviet Union

Service history
- In service: 1971–present
- Used by: See list of present and former operator
- Wars: Iran–Iraq War; 1982 Lebanon War; Angolan Civil War; Western Sahara War; Gulf War; Russo-Georgian War; First Libyan Civil War; Syrian Civil War; 2020 Armenian–Azerbaijani skirmishes; Second Nagorno-Karabakh War; Russo-Ukrainian War; 2025 India-Pakistan conflict

Production history
- Designer: NII-20 Research Institute
- Designed: 1960–1972
- Manufacturer: Znamya Truda Plant
- Produced: 1970–1988
- No. built: 1,200
- Variants: OSA-A, OSA-AK, OSA-AKM, OSA-M

Specifications (OSA-AKM)
- Mass: 17.5 tonnes
- Length: 9.14 m (30 ft 0 in)
- Width: 2.75 m (9 ft 0 in)
- Height: 4.20 m (13 ft 9 in) (radar mast stowed)
- Crew: 5 soldiers
- Main armament: 6 9M33, 9M33M1, 9M33M2 or 9M33M3 missiles
- Engine: D20K300 diesel
- Ground clearance: 400 mm (16 in)
- Operational range: 500 km (311 mi)
- Maximum speed: 80 km/h (50 mph); 8 km/h (5.0 mph) (swimming)

The 9K33 Osa (Russian: 9К33 «Оса»; English: "wasp"; NATO reporting name SA-8 Gecko) is a highly mobile, low-altitude, short-range tactical surface-to-air missile system developed in the Soviet Union in the 1960s and fielded in 1972. Its export version name is Romb.

== Description ==
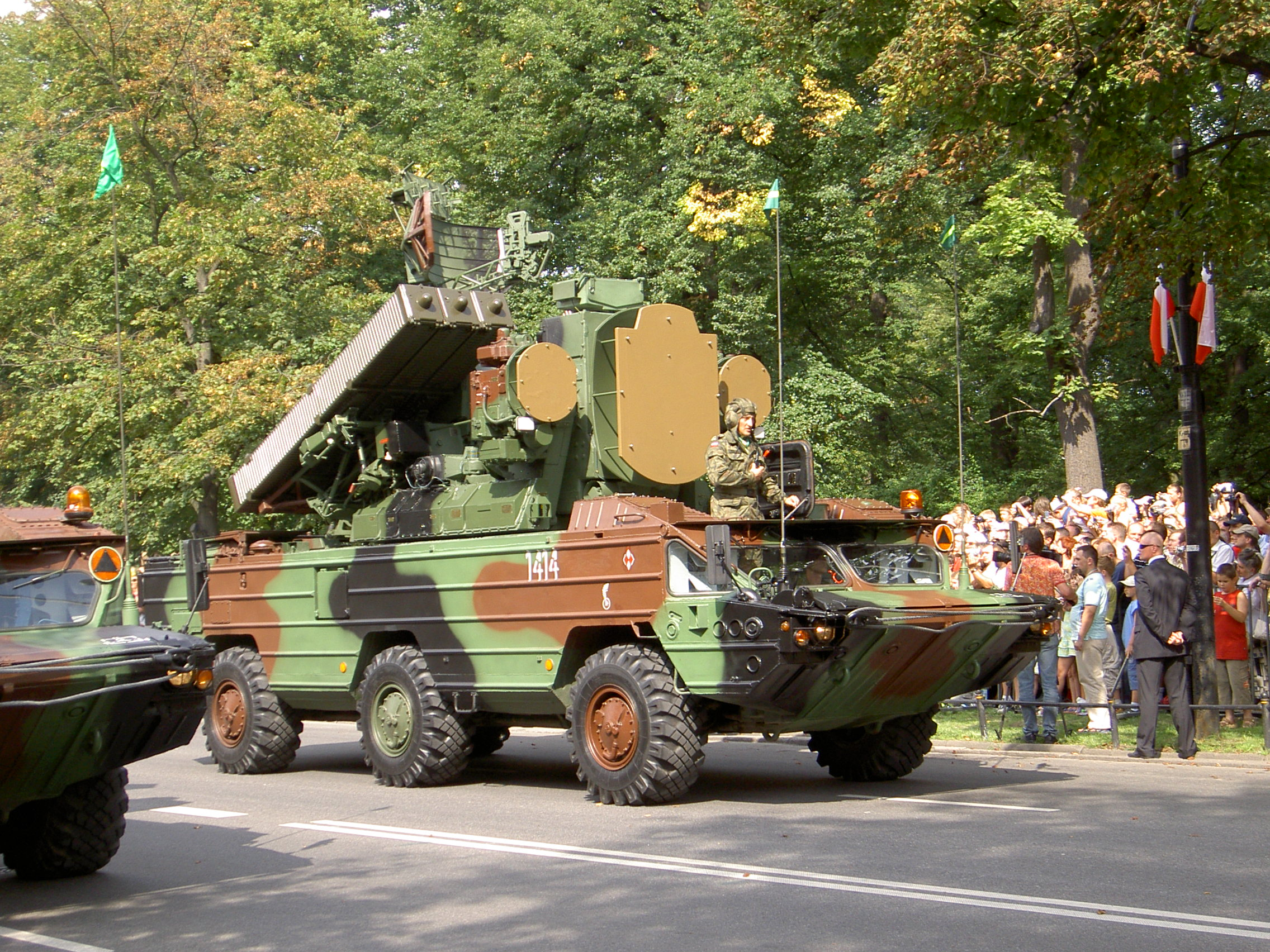
Polish OSA-AKM.

The Osa was the first mobile air defense missile system incorporating its own engagement radars on a single vehicle.

All versions of the 9K33 feature all-in-one 9A33 transporter erector launcher and radar (TELAR) vehicles which can detect, track and engage aircraft independently or with the aid of regimental surveillance radars. The six-wheeled transport vehicles BAZ-5937 are fully amphibious and air transportable. The road range is about 500 km.

The 1S51M3-2 radar system of the 9K33 Osa TELAR received the NATO codename Land Roll. It was derived from the naval 'Pop Group' radar system but is smaller as it does not require a stabilisation system. An improved system, the Osa-AKM (NATO reporting name SA-8B 'Gecko' Mod 1) was first seen in Germany in 1980. It had improvements to the launcher configuration, carrying six missiles in ribbed containers.

The system is reported to be of the frequency-agile monopulse type. It consists of an elliptical rotating surveillance antenna mounted on top of the array, operates in H band (6 to 8 GHz) and has a 30 km acquisition range against most targets. The large pulsed J band (14.5 GHz) engagement antenna is mounted below it in the centre of the array and has a maximum tracking range of about 20 km.

Mounted on either side of the tracking radar antenna is a small J band parabolic dish antenna to track the missile. Below it is a small circular antenna which emits an I band uplink capture beam to gather the missile shortly after launch. The final antennas in the array are two small white rectangular ones, one on either side of the array mounted alongside the I band, used for command uplink to the missile. The twin antenna system permits the 'Land Roll' radar to control up to two missiles simultaneously against a single target.

Two missiles can be guided on different frequencies to further complicate electronic countermeasures (ECM). The 9Sh33 electro optical tracker is fitted to and above the tracking radar, used to track the target when the main tracking radar is jammed by ECM.

A 9K33 battery comprises four 9A33B TELAR vehicles and two 9T217 transloader vehicles on BAZ-5939 chassis with reload missiles and a crane. A reload time of five minutes has been reported per TELAR.

In addition to the TELARs, each regiment is assigned a 9V914 radar collimation vehicle (initially on the BAZ-5938 chassis but more often found on the ZiL-131 truck) that assists in the alignment of the TELAR's radar systems, ensuring accurate target tracking and engagement.

== Variants ==
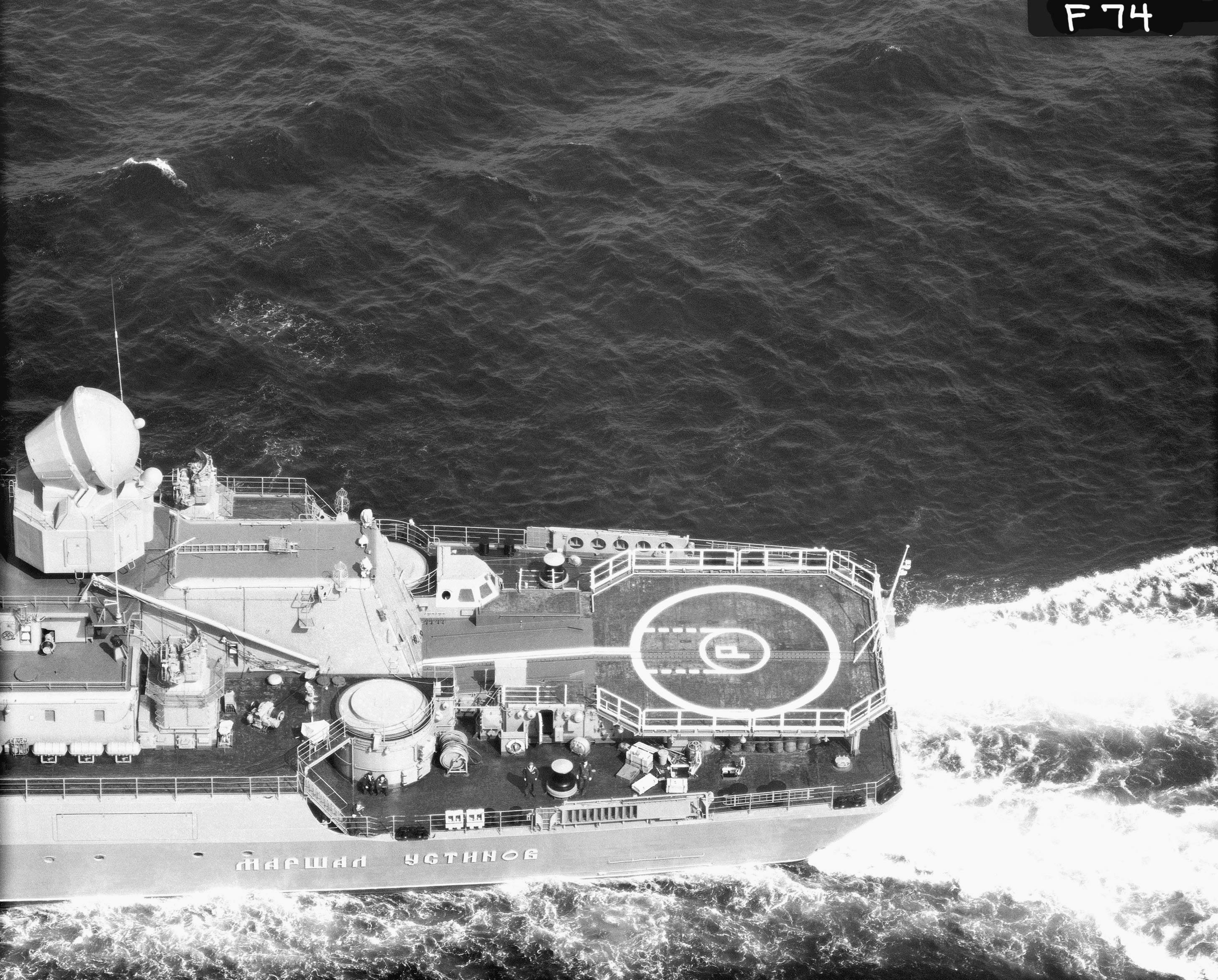
SA-N-4 launcher covered by a circular plate on the Slava-class cruiser Marshal Ustinov.

- 9K33 "Osa" (US DoD designation SA-8A "Gecko") began development in 1960 and was introduced in 1971–1972 with four exposed 9M33 missiles per 9A33B TELAR and maximum range of 12 km (7.5 mi).
- 4K33 "OSA-M" (NATO reporting name SA-N-4 "Gecko") was introduced in 1972 and is the naval version of the system with two 9M33M missiles on a ZIF-122 retractable rotating launcher and improved performance. It has been installed on Gepard-class frigate, Kara-class guided missile cruisers, Kiev-class VTOL cruisers and also the Kirov, Slava and Krivak classes.
- 9K33M2 "Osa-AK" (US DoD designation SA-8B "Gecko Mod-0") with 9A33BM2 TELAR was introduced in 1975 with the new six-missile box launcher, each 9M33M2 missile being a sealed round.
- 9K33M3 "Osa-AKM" (US DoD designation SA-8B "Gecko Mod-1") with 9A33BM3 TELAR and 9M33M3 missiles was introduced in 1980 with the maximum range extended to 15 km (9.3 mi) and maximum altitude to 12 km (40,000 ft) as explained above. Most OSA-AKM systems also feature an IFF antenna.
- Saman and Saman-M (Russian Саман – adobe) is a development of the Osa\Osa-M system into target drones, used for testing and training with air defense systems, including SAMs.

The 9K33M3 is also able to use wire-guided missiles, presumably for use in an ECM-heavy environment where radio command guidance may not operate properly.

== Missiles ==
9M33
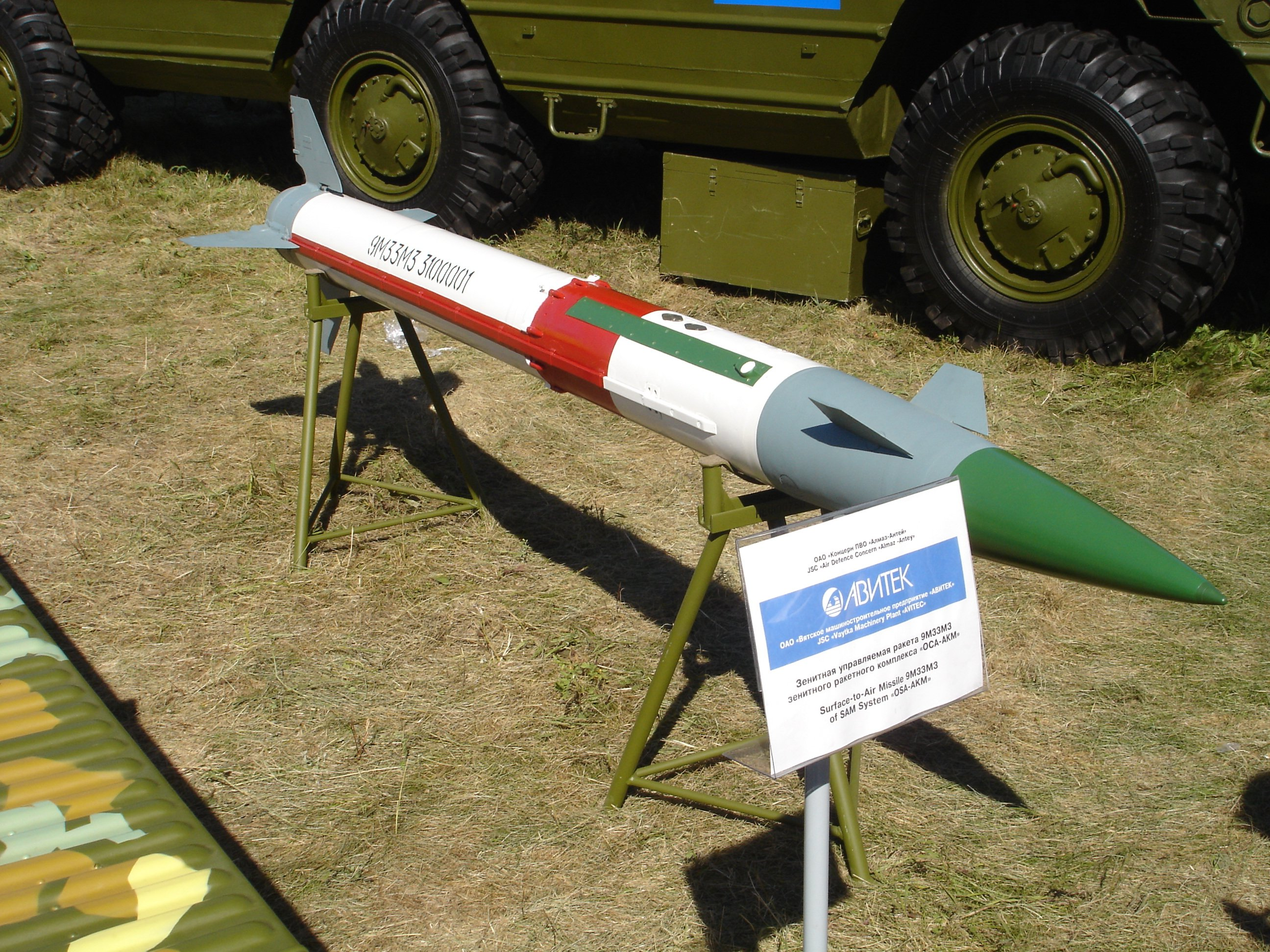
- 9M33M3 missile
- Type: Surface-to-air missile
- Place of origin: Soviet Union

Service history
- In service: 1971–present
- Used by: See list of present and former operator

Production history
- Designer: MKB "Fakel"
- Designed: 1960–1972
- Manufacturer: Znamya Truda Plant
- Produced: 1970–1988
- Variants: 9M33, 9M33M1, 9M33M2, 9M33M3, 9A33BM3

Specifications (9K33M3)
- Mass: 170 kg (370 lb)
- Length: 3,158 mm (10 ft 4.3 in)
- Diameter: 209.6 mm (8 in)
- Warhead: Frag-HE
- Warhead weight: 15 kg (33 lb)
- Detonation mechanism: Contact and proximity
- Propellant: Solid propellant rocket motor
- Operational range: 15 kilometres (9.3 mi)
- Flight altitude: 12,000 metres (39,000 ft)
- Boost time: 2 s boost, then 15 s sustain
- Maximum speed: 1020 m/s (Mach 2.9)
- Guidance system: RF CLOS
- Steering system: dual-thrust rocket motor
- Accuracy: 5 m
- Launch platform: 9P35M2

Engagement range for early versions is approximately 2–9 km (1.3–5.6 mi) with engagement altitudes of between 50 and 5,000 m (164–16,400 ft). The 9M33M2 "Osa-A" missile extends the ranges to 1.5–10 km (1–6.2 mi) and engagement altitudes to 25–5,000 m (82–16,400 ft). The 9M33M3 missile greatly enhances the altitude engagement envelope to 10–12,000 m (33–42,500 ft), and are able to travel further (about 15 km/9 mi). However, the system is unable to engage targets at longer ranges, due to other factors such as the limitations of the radar tracking of the missiles. The system is designed for use primarily against jet aircraft and helicopters in any weather.

The 9M33 missiles are 3.158 m (10.3 ft) long, weigh 126 kg (278 lb) and use command guidance. A backup low-light optical tracking system is available for heavy ECM environments. The latest 9M33M3 missiles have an increased total weight of 170 kg (375 lb) in order to provide extended range coverage and larger warhead. Propulsion is provided by a dual-thrust solid fuel rocket motor. Both versions feature a missile speed of around Mach 2.4 (peaking at around Mach 3) for a maximum target engagement speed of around Mach 1.4 for the original 9M33 missile and Mach 1.6 for the 9M33M2\M3 missiles. The warhead for 9M33/M2 versions weighs 19 kg (42 lb), increased to 40 kg (88 lb) in the M3 version to improve performance against helicopters. All versions have impact and proximity fuzes.

Each TELAR is able to launch and guide two missiles against one target simultaneously. Kill probability is quoted as 0.35–0.85 for the Osa and 0.55–0.85 for the Osa-AK and Osa-AKM (presumably depending upon target aspect, speed, maneuverability and radar cross section). Reaction time (from target detection to launch) is around 26 seconds. Preparation time for engagements from transit is around 4 minutes and missile reloading takes around 5 minutes. Each battery of four TELARs is usually accompanied by two reload vehicles carrying 18 missiles in sets of three, with a crane mounted on the reload vehicles to assist in moving the missiles.

When launched, the booster motor burns for two seconds, permitting the radar to gather and control it at very short ranges (about 1.6 km). The sustainer motor burns for 15 seconds, bringing the missile to a top speed of about Mach 2. Once launched, the missile is command-guided for the whole flight, and the warhead is detonated by its proximity fuze or possibly command. The warhead is said to have a lethal radius of 5 m at low altitude against an F-4 Phantom II size target.

== Radars ==
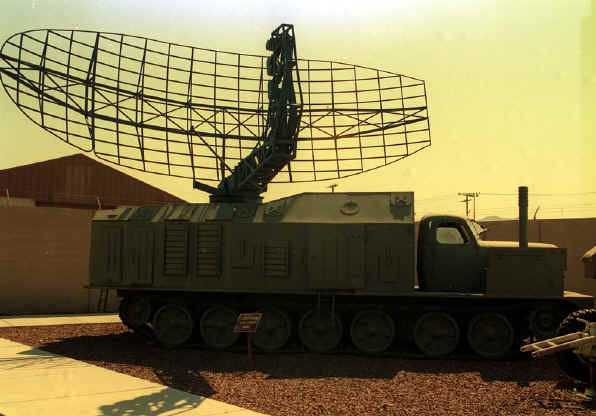
P-40 'Long Track' radar set

- 1S51M3 ("Land Roll") – C band target acquisition radar, H band conical scan target tracking radar and two J band pulse mode fire control radars (range 35 km/22 mi for acquisition, 30 km/19 mi for tracking and 25 km/16 mi for guidance). Mounted on the TELAR.
- P-40 ("Long Track") – E band early warning radar (also used by 2K11 Krug and 2K12 Kub, range 175 km/108 mi), mounted on a tracked vehicle (a modified AT-T).
- P-15 ("Flat Face A") or P-19 ("Flat Face B") or P-15M(2) ("Squat Eye") – 380 kW C band target acquisition radar (also used by the S-125 Neva/Pechora and 2K12 Kub, range 250 km/155 mi), mounted on a ZiL-131 truck.
- PRV-9 or PRV-16 ("Thin Skin") – E band height finding radar (also used by 2K11 Krug and 2K12 Kub, range 240 km/148 mi), mounted on a KrAZ-255B truck.

== Deployment and operational history ==
Produced by the Soviet Union/Russia, the system was exported to many countries, including Cuba, Greece (from the former East Germany), Polish People's Republic, Ba'athist Syria, Republic of Ecuador and Ba'athist Iraq.

During the 1982 Lebanon war in which Syrian air defenses were obliterated by a massive air campaign against Syrian SAM sites in the Beqaa valley, the Syrians deployed Osas. An F-4 Phantom in a SEAD mission was shot down on 24 July 1982 by an Osa system. The WSO (back seater), Aharon Katz was killed, while the pilot, Gil Fogel, survived and was held captive by the Syrians for two years.

In the late 1980s, Cuba deployed several 9K33 Osa units in southern Angola, which posed a significant threat to South African air superiority at shorter ranges. The South African 61 Mechanised Battalion Group captured an intact 9K33 Osa anti-aircraft missile system on 3 October 1987 during the Battle of Cuito Cuanavale. This was the first time that such a system had fallen into possession of non-Warsaw Pact forces, giving Western intelligence agencies an opportunity to examine an important Soviet-bloc weapon system.

Iraq fielded Osa systems during the 1991 Gulf War. The Soviets claimed that it was the most effective system alongside the ZSU-23-4 Shilka at shooting down Tomahawk cruise missiles, with several downings credited to hits from Osa weapons.

The system also saw use in the 2008 Russo-Georgian War by both the Georgian and Russian militaries.

Libya deployed 9K33 Osa, with some destroyed during the 2011 Libyan Civil War by NATO airstrikes.

=== Syrian Civil War ===
In October 2012, fighters from the insurgent faction Liwa al-Islam (renamed Jaish al-Islam the following year) captured three operational 9K33 Osa mobile SAMs in Damascus's Eastern Ghouta. In the following years, at least six missiles were launched at Ba'athist Syria - Syrian Arab Air Force helicopters that were flying over the area: on the 29th of July 2013, an Mi-8/17 helicopter was apparently destroyed; in the following months (on an unknown date), there was a second launch—its effect was unclear; on the 16th of January 2014, an Mi-17 helicopter was shot down; two days later, another missile was fired and it missed its intended target; in March 2014, Jaish al-Islam released an undated video that showed a 9M33 missile exploding in the proximity of an Mi-8/17. In October and December 2015, the Russian Ministry of Defence claimed its forces had destroyed Osa systems operated by the insurgents in the Eastern Ghouta. No further launch was reported until the 26th of June 2016, when a missile heavily damaged an Mi-25 helicopter, forcing it to make an emergency landing at Damascus International Airport. All of Jaysh al-Islam's Osa systems were likely retaken, or destroyed, upon the Syrian Arab Army's recapture of the Eastern Ghouta in April 2018.

=== Yemeni Civil War ===
On 29 November 2019, Russian sources speculated that a Soviet-made 9K33 Osa fired by Houthi forces had shot down a Saudi Arabian Army Aviation AH-64 Apache attack helicopter in Yemen. This deduction was made because the armed forces of neither Yemen nor Iran deploy the 9K33 Osa, while some known Houthi-operated systems are based on the Soviet-made 2K12 Kub surface-to-air missile system which employs a two-stage rocket engine, and the air-to-air missiles R-73 and R-27T which both have a single-stage rocket engine.

=== 2020 Nagorno-Karabakh conflict ===
The Armenian Air Defense extensively employed 9K33 Osa missile systems during the 2020 Nagorno-Karabakh conflict. During the opening days of the war, several videos released by the Azerbaijani military showed Armenian 9K33 Osa and 9K35 Strela-10 vehicles destroyed by Bayraktar TB2 armed drones; more of them were destroyed on the battlefield in the following weeks. The Azerbaijani army used Bayraktar TB2s to destroy twelve Armenian 9K33 Osa systems. On 4 October 2020, Armenian forces, probably using a 9K33 Osa, shot down an Azerbaijani Air Force Sukhoi Su-25 aircraft while it was targeting Armenian positions in Fuzuli. Its pilot, Colonel Zaur Nudiraliyev, died in the crash. Azerbaijani officials acknowledged the loss in December 2020, with the 9K33 Osa vehicle possibly using passive detection and shoot and scoot tactics to survive the Azerbaijani suppression of air defenses (SEAD) missions.

=== Russo-Ukrainian War ===
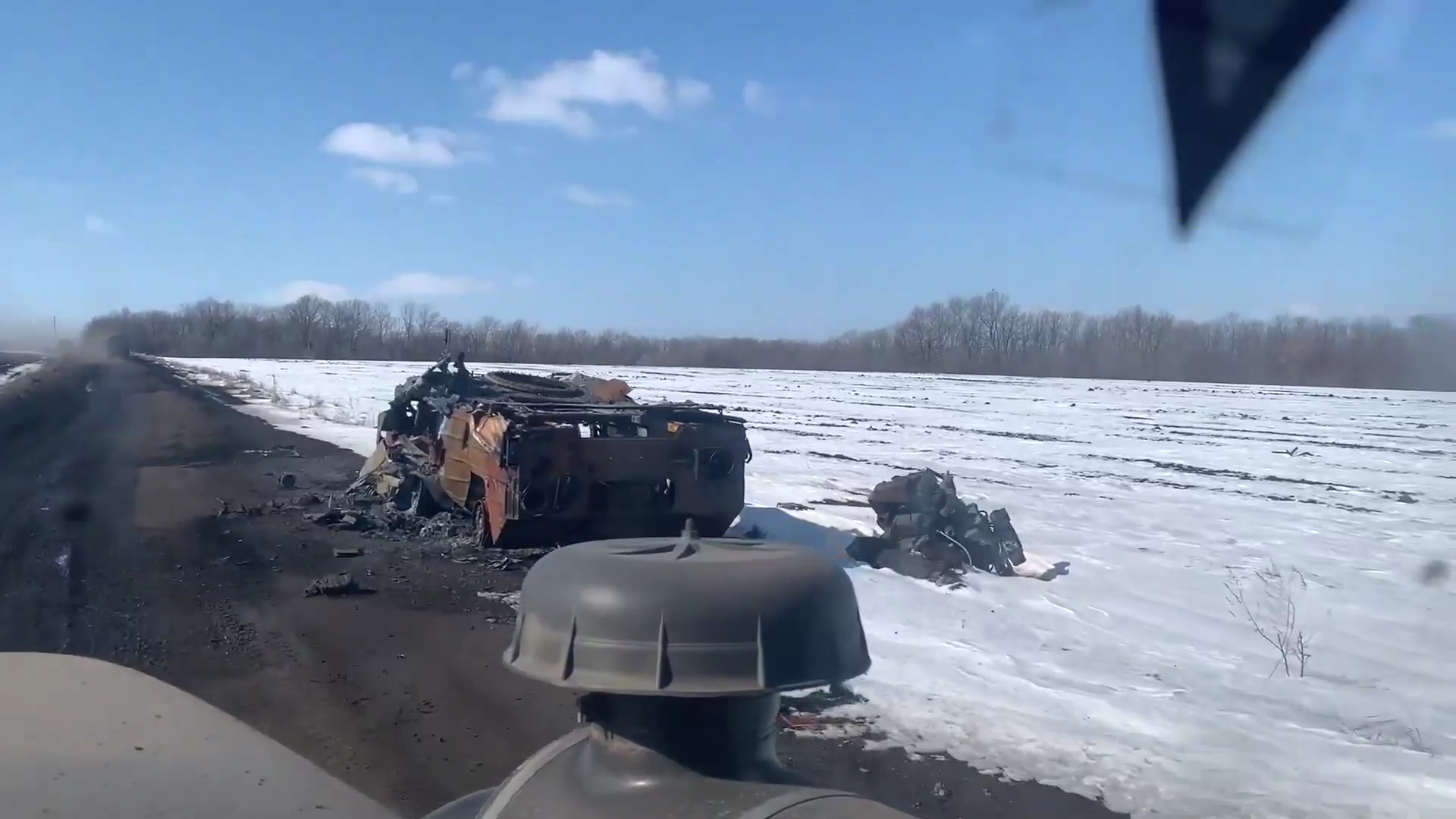
Ukrainian 9K33 Osa launcher destroyed during the 2022 Russian invasion.

Both Russia and Ukraine have 9K33 Osa systems in their inventory.

On 30 March 2019, during the war in Donbas, the Ukrainian Joint Forces reported destruction of an Osa-AKM surface-to-air missile system along with a Zhitel R330Zh automatic jamming system.

Senior sources of the Ukrainian Air Force stated that some Osa and Buk systems were destroyed by Kh-31P and Kh-58 anti-radiation missiles during the early stages of the Russian invasion in the spring of 2022. Following the invasion, The Washington Post reported that the United States was sending additional Osa systems to Ukraine. Poland has also provided Ukraine with an undisclosed number of systems in 2022.

In December 2024, it was revealed that all Ukrainian Ground Forces units operating the Osa received modified versions capable of firing the R-73 air-to-air missile in response to the dwindling stocks of the 9M33 missile.

As of 24 July 2026, 40 losses of 9K33s by Russia and 24 by Ukraine are documented with photos or video by the OSINT website Oryx. The War Zone notes that the number of losses could be higher since Oryx only tabulates visually confirmed losses.

=== 2025 India-Pakistan conflict ===
The Indian Army employed its Osa regiments as part of its Integrated Air Defence System during the 2025 India-Pakistan Conflict. Footage shot by Asian News International after the conflict, shows that an Osa regiment scored a number of claimed kills against low-flying Pakistani drones, such as the Turkish made Yiha-IIIs.

== Command post ==
PPRU-M1 (PPRU-M1-2) is a mobile command center for a mixed grouping of air defense forces, including 9K33 Osa, and Tor missile system, 2K22 Tunguska, 9K35 Strela-10 and 9K38 Igla.

== Upgrades ==
=== Belarus ===
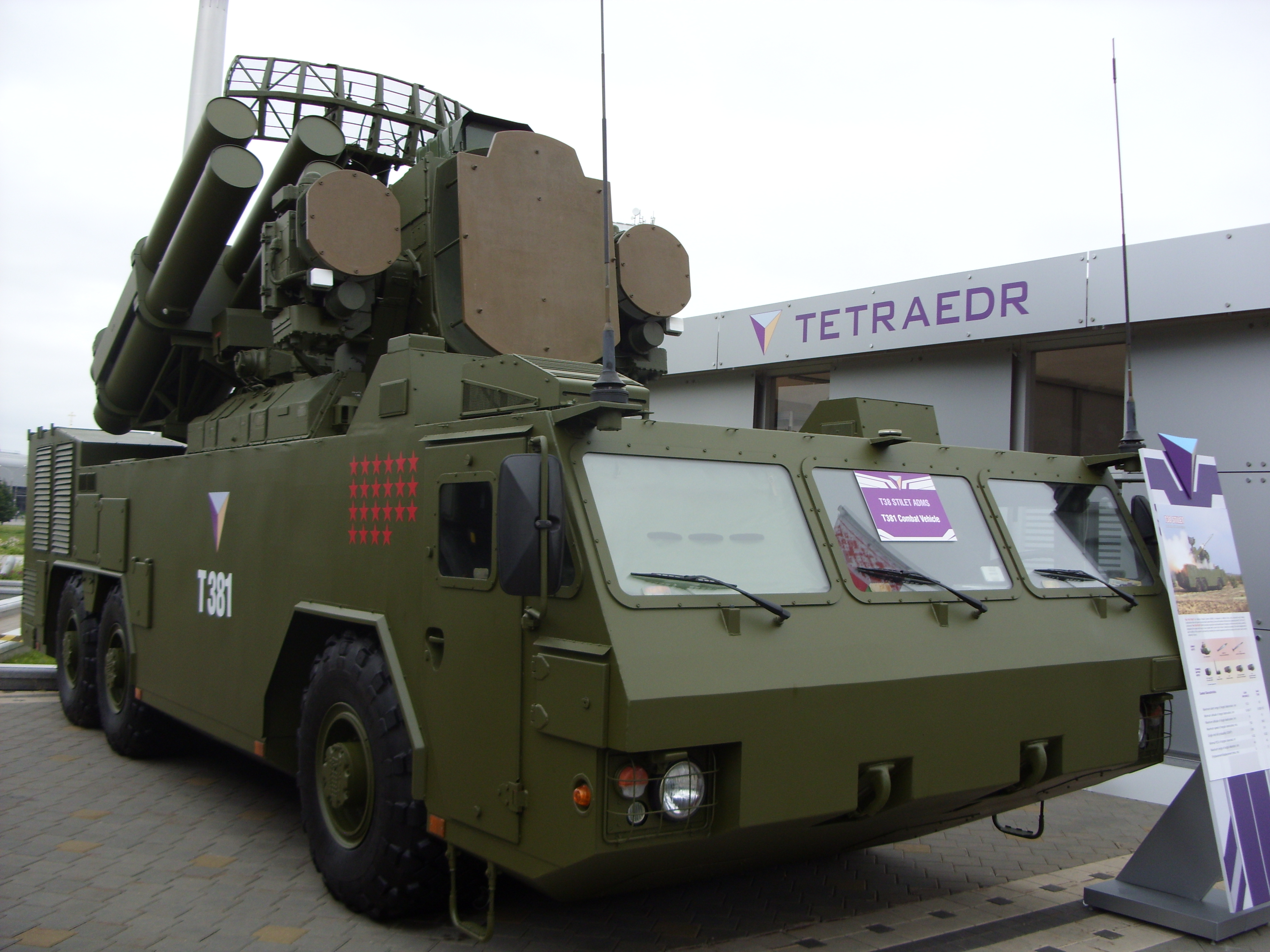
T38 Stilet

- 9K33-1T "Osa-1T" was developed by UE "Tetraedr" from Belarus. A SAM system comprises combat assets and technical support means, including:
  - 9А33-1Т TELAR or "Combat Vehicle", based on the original BAZ-5937 (or the new MZKT-69222) and equipped with a new day/night camera system OES-1T instead of the original day-only 9Sh33 or 9Sh38-2 "Karat";
  - 9M33M2 or M3 SAMs, or the new 9M33M3-1 with a range of 20 km;
  - 9Т217-1T Transportation and Loading Vehicle (TLV);
  - 9V210-1T Maintenance Vehicle (MV);
  - 9V214-1T Alignment Vehicle (AV);
  - 9V242-1T Automatic Mobile Check-up and Testing Station (AKIPS) and
  - 9F16M2 Ground Equipment Kit (GEK).
- T38 "Stilet" is a further development of Osa-1T. Main components are the T381 TELAR on MZKT-69222 chassis and the new T382 missile. Maximum range of targets' destruction 20 km, minimal RCS of targets detected 0.02 m^{2}.

=== Poland ===
- Osa-AKM-P1 "Żądło" (export name SA-8P Sting) is a Polish upgrade of 9K33M2 "Osa-AK" and 9K33M3 "Osa-AKM". Probably 32 of the 64 systems purchased from the Soviet Union have been upgraded. An upgraded 9A33BM3-P1 TELAR was displayed at the MSPO 2004 exhibition in Kielce, Poland. The upgraded vehicle is fitted with the SIC 12/TA passive detection and identification system as well as the ISZ-01 IFF system.

In 2019, Poland began modification of the whole environment of the Osa system. Those works has been commissioned to WZU Grudziądz. The total cost is about €40-50 million.

=== Ukraine ===
- Osa-AKM "FrankenSAM" is a 2024 Ukrainian upgrade funded by the Come Back Alive Foundation, which invested over 14 million hryvnias (around US$336,000) to upgrade an undisclosed number of Osa-AKM systems. This upgrade allows the R-73 air-to-air missile to be mounted and launched, in addition to the original 9M33 missile series.

== Operators ==
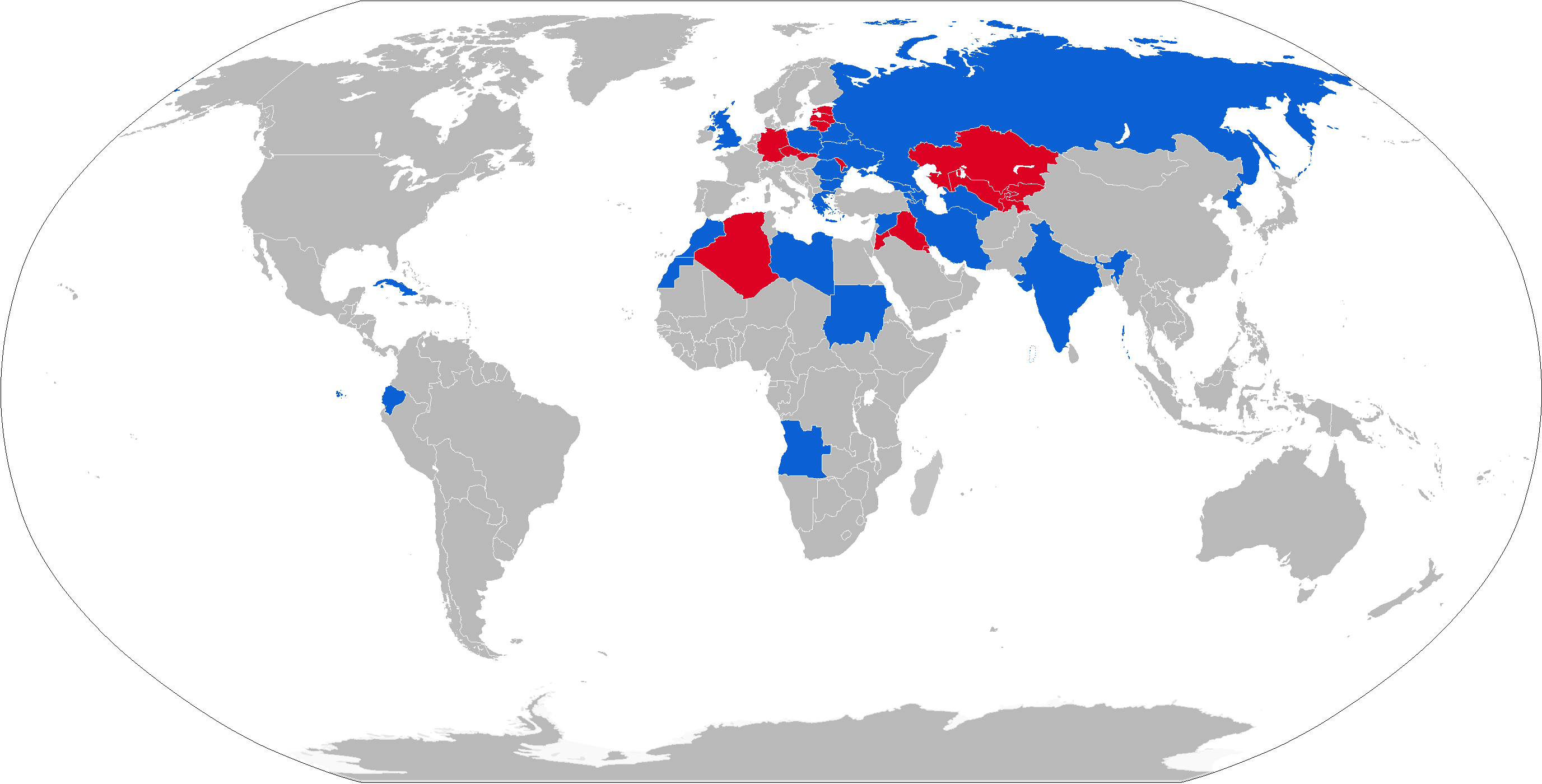
Operators Current Former

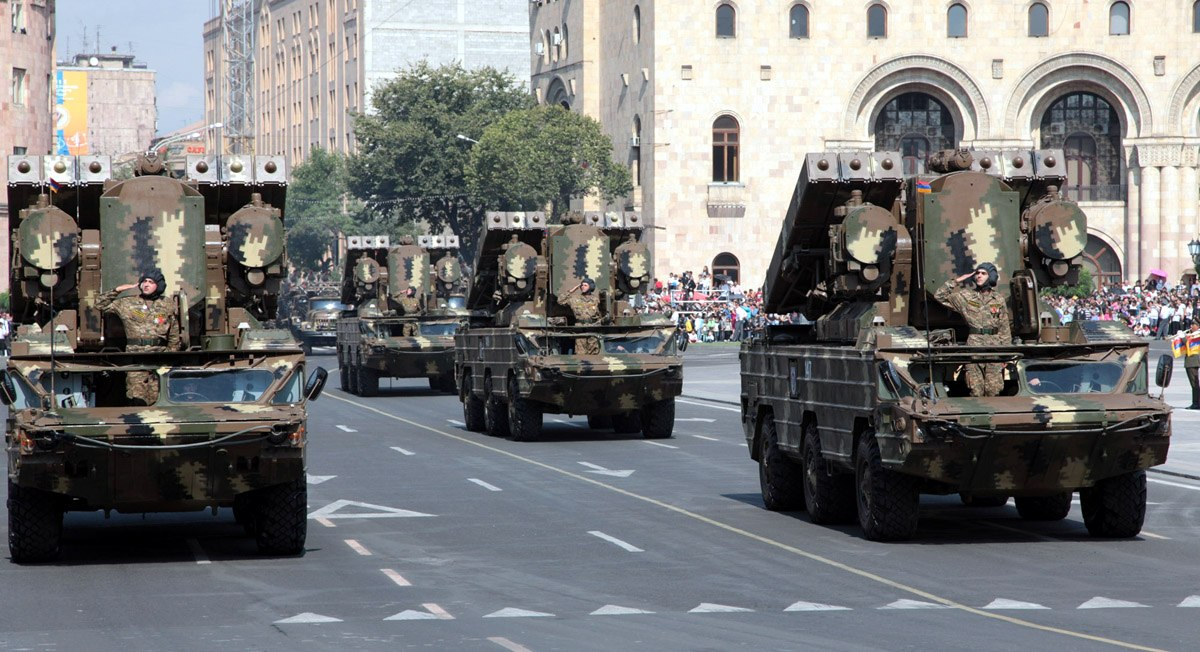
Armenian 9K33 Osa missiles during a military parade in Yerevan

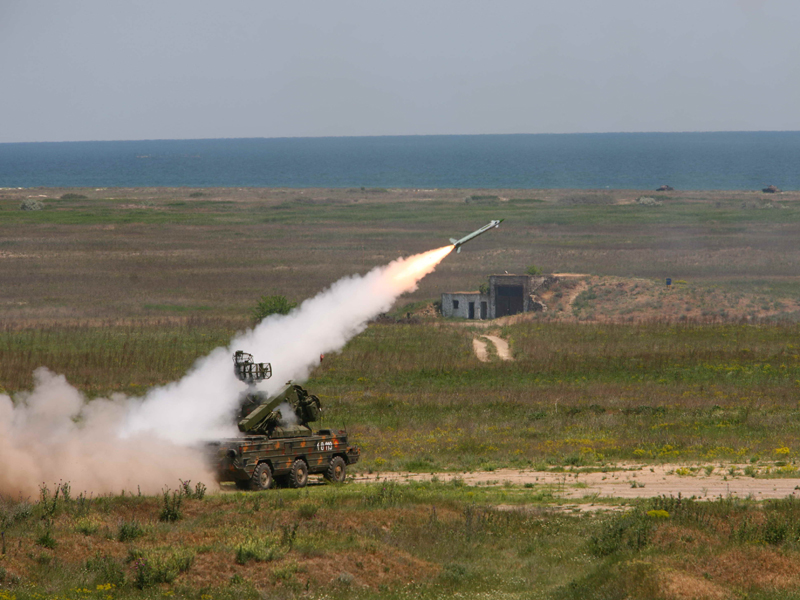
Romanian 9K33 Osa missile launch at the Capu Midia firing range.

=== Current operators ===
- Angola – 15 as of 2024
- Armenia
- Azerbaijan – Upgraded to the Osa-1T standard
- Belarus
- Bulgaria − 24 as of 2024
- Cuba
- Germany – unknown number retained from East German stocks for OPFOR training
- Ecuador − 10 as of 2024, operated by the Air Force
- Georgia − 8 Osa-AK and Osa-AKM as of 2024
- Greece – 38 Osa-M as of 2024 Being transferred to Armenia
- India – 50+ Osa-AKM as of 2024

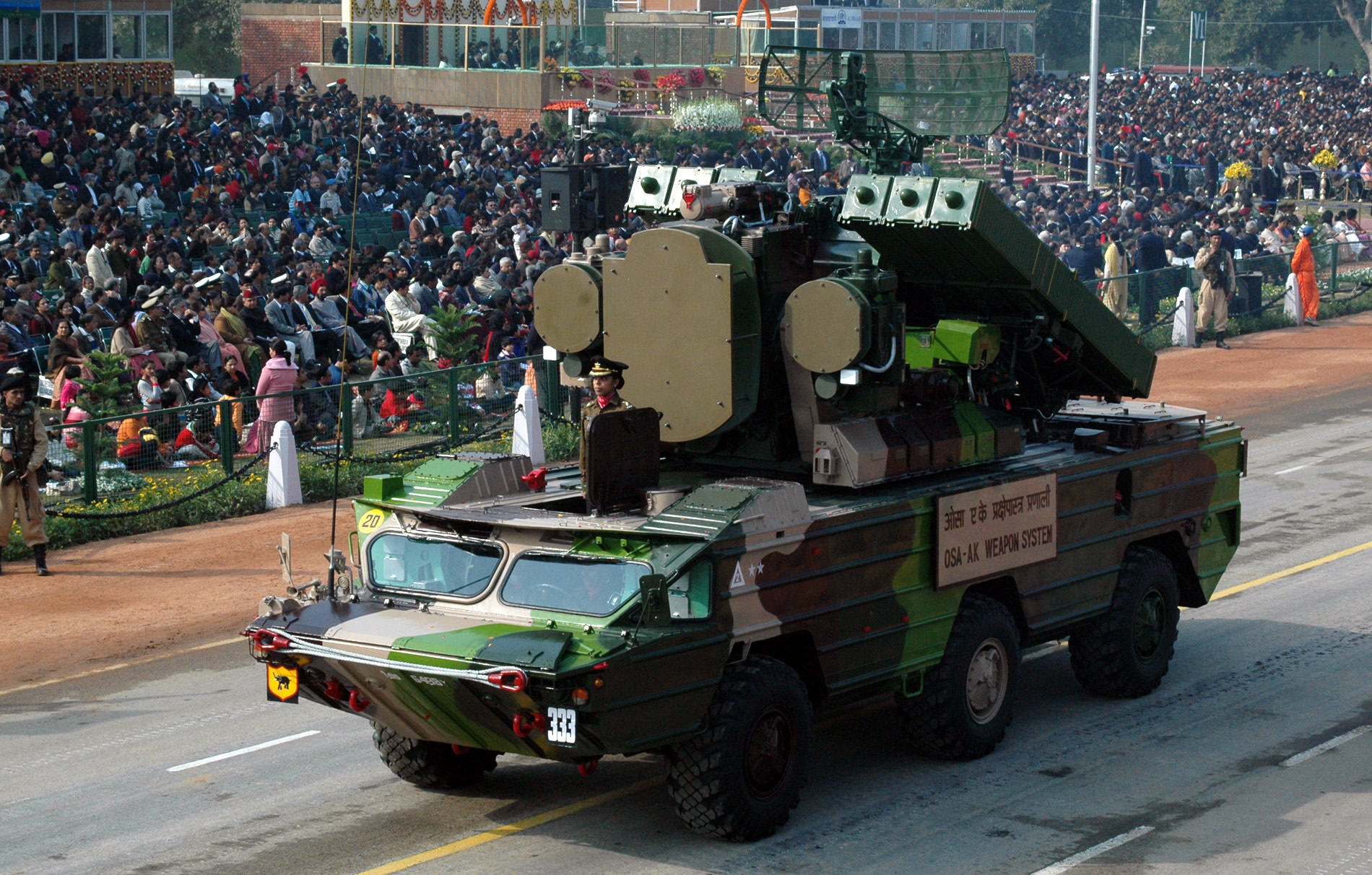
Indian 9K33 Osa missile system in Delhi during a military parade

- Poland − 64 as of 2024. Modernized to the Osa-AKM-P1 standard
- Romania – 16 as of 2024
- Russia – 390 Osa-AKM used by the Ground Forces and 20 by the Naval Infantry as of 2024
- Sudan
- Syria
- Turkmenistan – 40 as of 2024
- United Kingdom – 5 systems, obtained from German and Polish surplus, and registered 35AY74 - 35AY78 inclusive, are operated by the RAF Threat Delivery Flight, based out of RAF Spadeadam
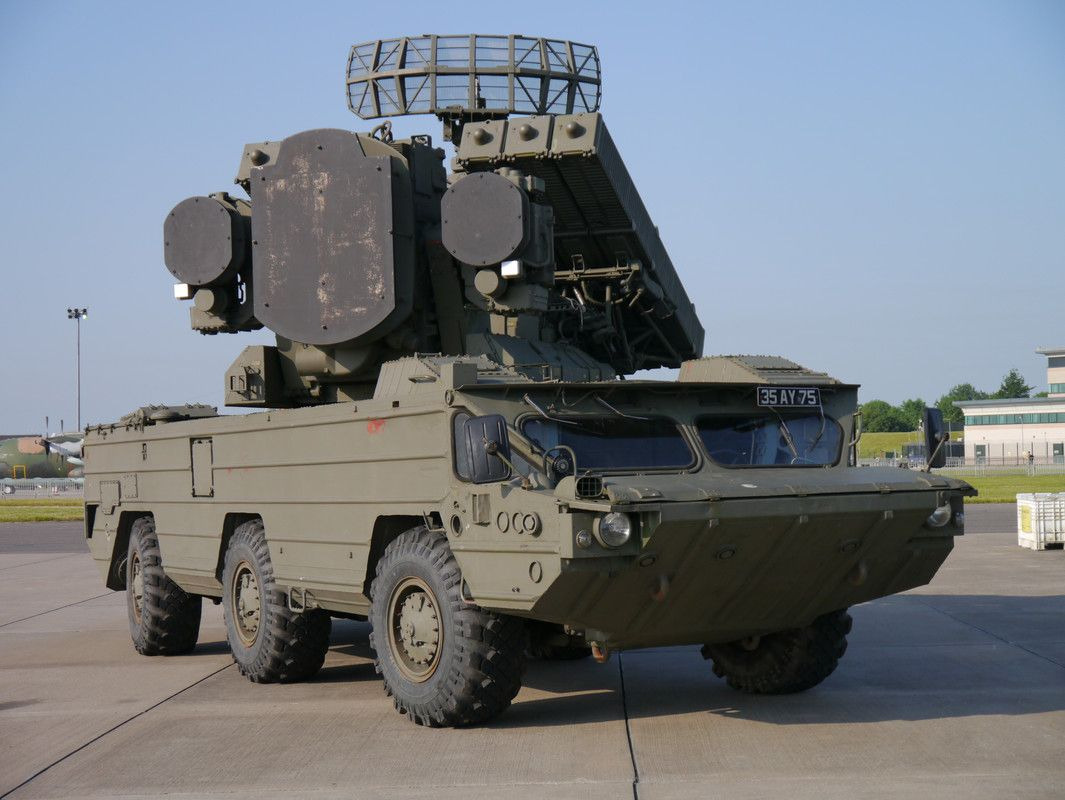
  British operated 9K33 Osa during an RAF airshow
- Ukraine – Estimated by the IISS to have 65 OSA-AKM in 2024. Received an unknown number of systems from Poland during the Russian invasion of Ukraine

=== Former operators ===
- Algeria
- Artsakh − Seized by Azerbaijan after the 2023 Nagorno-Karabakh clashes
- Croatia
- Czechoslovakia – 40 in 1992. Passed on to the Czech Republic
- Czech Republic
- East Germany – 41 received from the Soviet Union between 1981 and 1985. 12 sold to Greece after the German reunification.
- Iraq – 50 systems delivered from the Soviet Union between 1982 and 1985. As well as captured Kuwaiti units.
- Jordan – retired in 2017, 52 offered for sale. 35 Osa-AKs sold to Armenia before 2020.
- Kuwait – Purchased in the late 1980s. Captured by the Iraqi forces in the Gulf War.
- Libya – 40 used by the Army and 50 by the Air Defense Command in 1992, unknown number operational prior to the First Libyan Civil War.
- Serbia and Montenegro
- South Africa − Captured from Angola. Used for training
- Soviet Union – 1000+ in 1991. Passed on to successor states.
- Yugoslavia − 20 in 1992. Passed on to successor states
