= Sealed round =

Munition stored ready-to-use in a container

A sealed round is a munition which is typically stored in some kind of container (usually a cylinder or box, but the container may in fact be the outside of the munition), so that the munition does not require any sort of maintenance and is stored in this container until use. The advantage of this type of system is that such munitions can be stored for long periods without needing to be periodically checked and possibly repaired. Typically these, like all munitions, still do have a shelf life—but it is often quite long. Bullets-based cartridges have been sealed rounds (in particular Captive-piston ammunition) ever since the cartridge case was invented.

== Anti-aircraft missiles ==
Many surface-to-air missiles (SAMs) and air-to-air missiles (AAMs), which are traditionally very maintenance-intense systems, are moving to this type of system. Examples of modern missile systems which feature sealed rounds include:

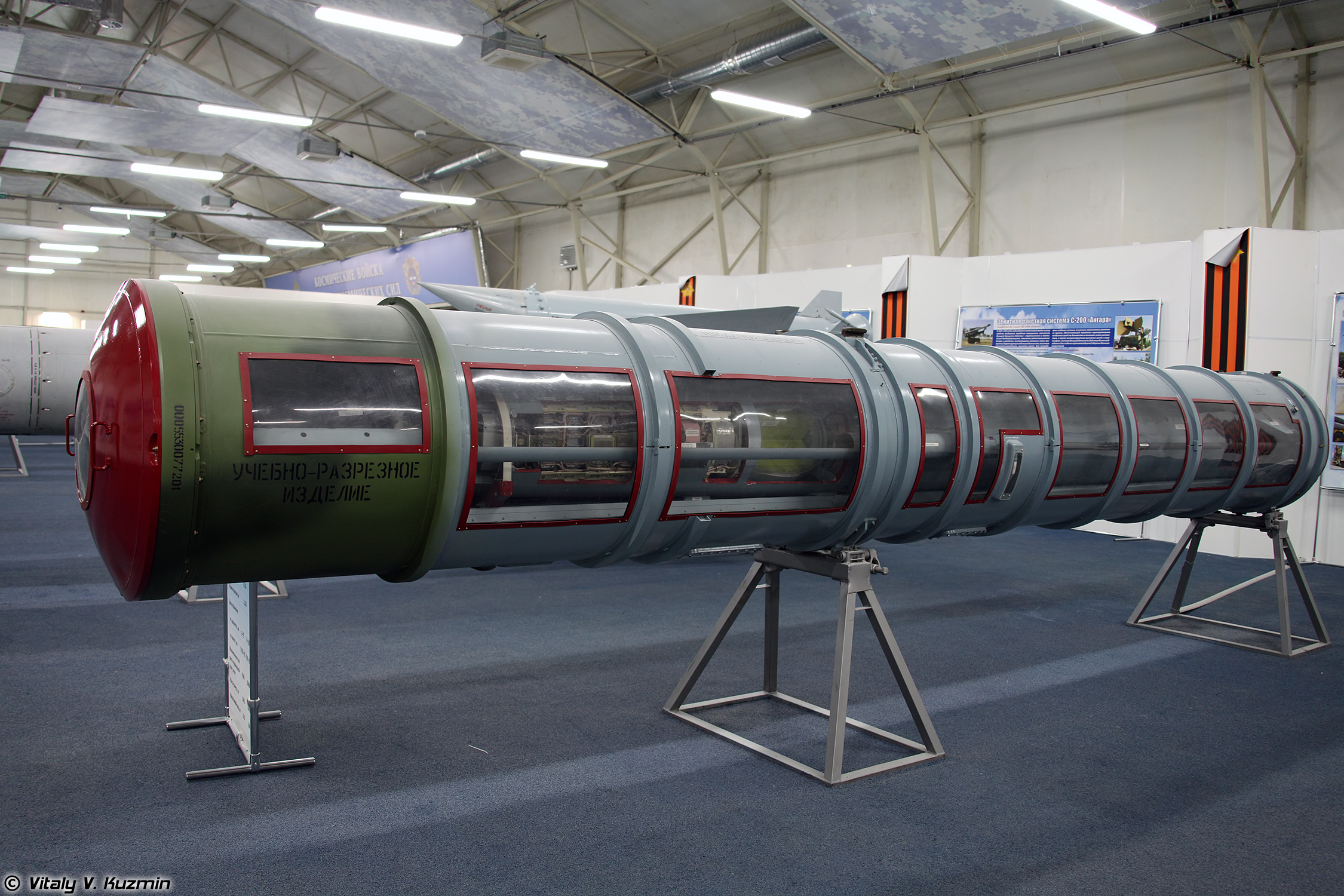
S-300 cutaway exhibit

- MIM-104 "Patriot" SAM
- S-300P (SA-10 "Grumble") SAM
- S-300V (SA-12 "Gladiator"/"Giant") SAM
- 9M33M2/3 "Osa-AKM" (SA-8B "Gecko") SAM
- AIM-54C ECCM/Sealed "Phoenix" AAM

The MIM-104, S-300P and S-300V missiles are stored in cylinders, which they are ejected out of upon launch. The 9M33 missiles are stored in boxes in the factory and launched out of them. The AIM-54C missiles are not stored in any kind of container, but are sealed unlike the earlier AIM-54A and AIM-54B which exchanged fluids with the host aircraft. In this case, the advantage of low maintenance has been exchanged for the disadvantage of lower capability, but this is not the case with the other examples.

== Anti-tank weapons ==
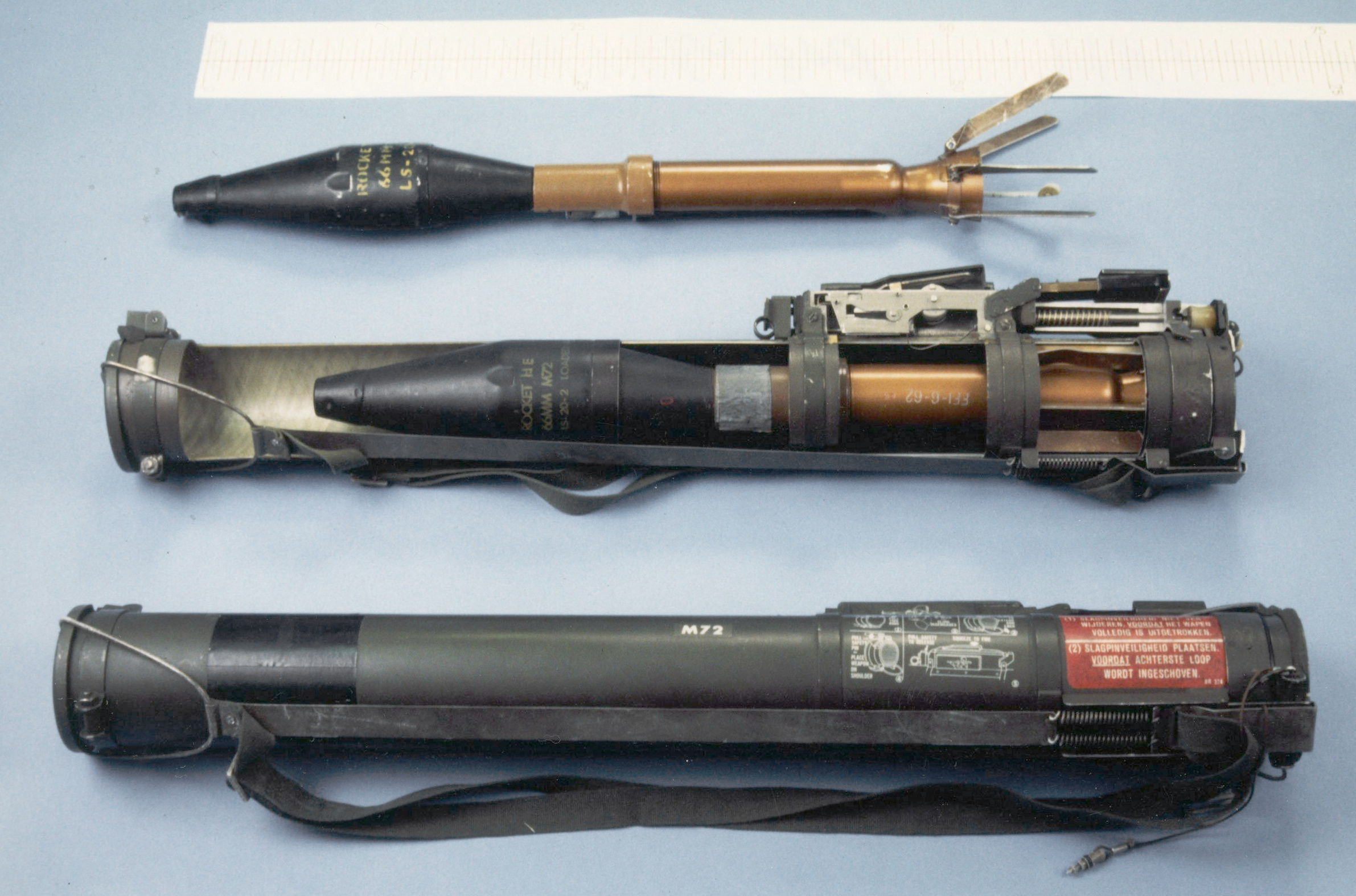
Cross section of M72 LAW

Many infantry anti-tank weapons use sealed rounds; some—such as the US M72 LAW, the Russian RPG-18 and the Swedish AT4—also use the container as the launcher, so that the whole system is discarded after firing.

== See also ==
- List of established military terms
- Glossary of firearms terms
- Glossary of British ordnance terms
