= 118th Mechanized Brigade (Ukraine) =

Ukrainian Ground Forces unit

- 118-та окрема механізована бригада
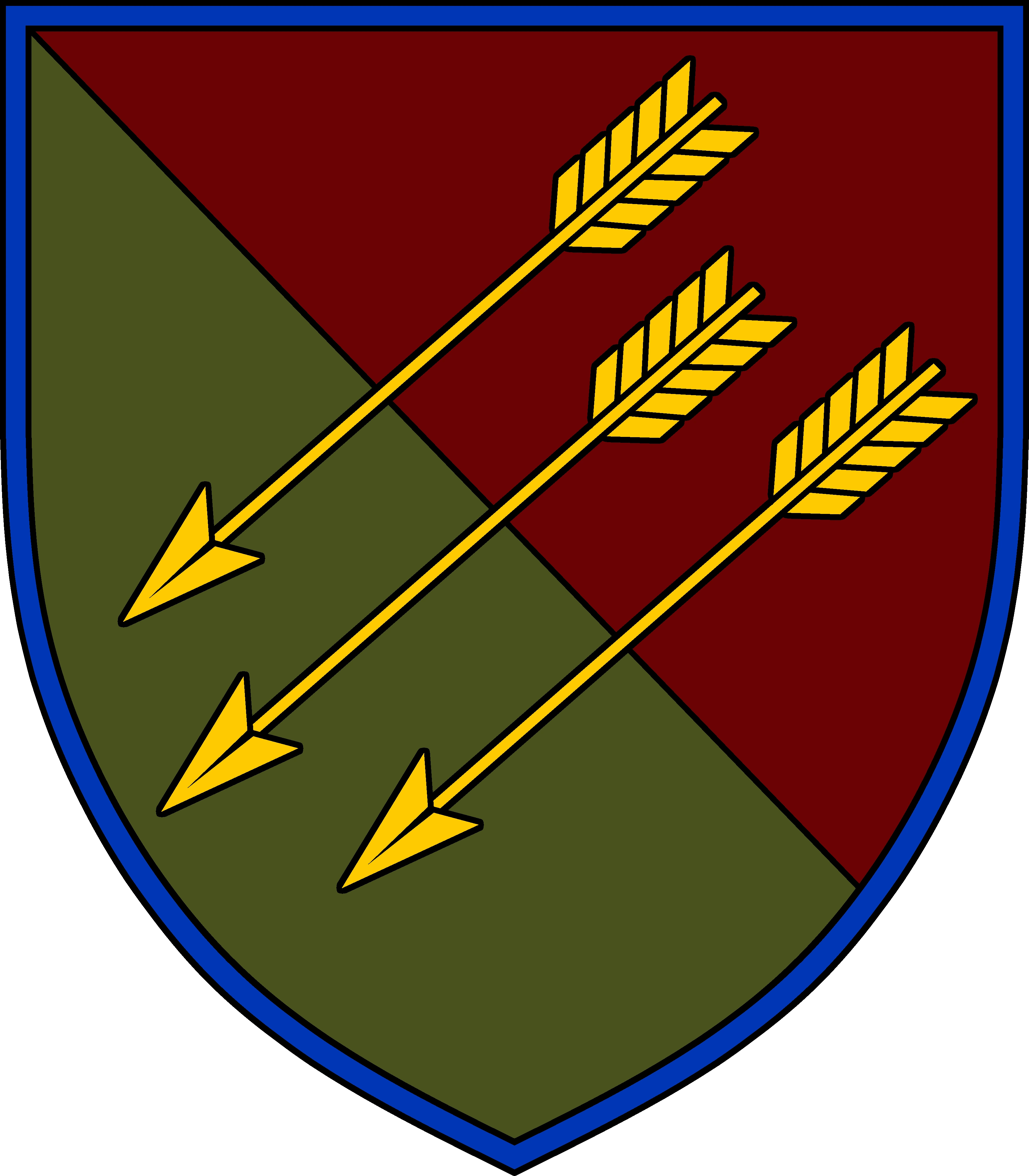
- Active: February 15, 2023 – Today
- Country: Ukraine
- Branch: Ukrainian Ground Forces
- Role: Mechanized Infantry
- Part of: 17th Army Corps
- Garrison/HQ: Holovach, Poltava Oblast
- Motto: We’ll do it
- Engagements: Russo-Ukrainian War: 2023 Ukrainian counteroffensive; Defense of Mala Tokmachka
- Website: Official Facebook page

Commanders
- Current commander: Colonel Oleh Dmytryshyn

The 118th Mechanized Brigade (Ukrainian: 118-та окрема механізована бригада) is a brigade of the Ukrainian Ground Forces formed in 2023.

== History ==
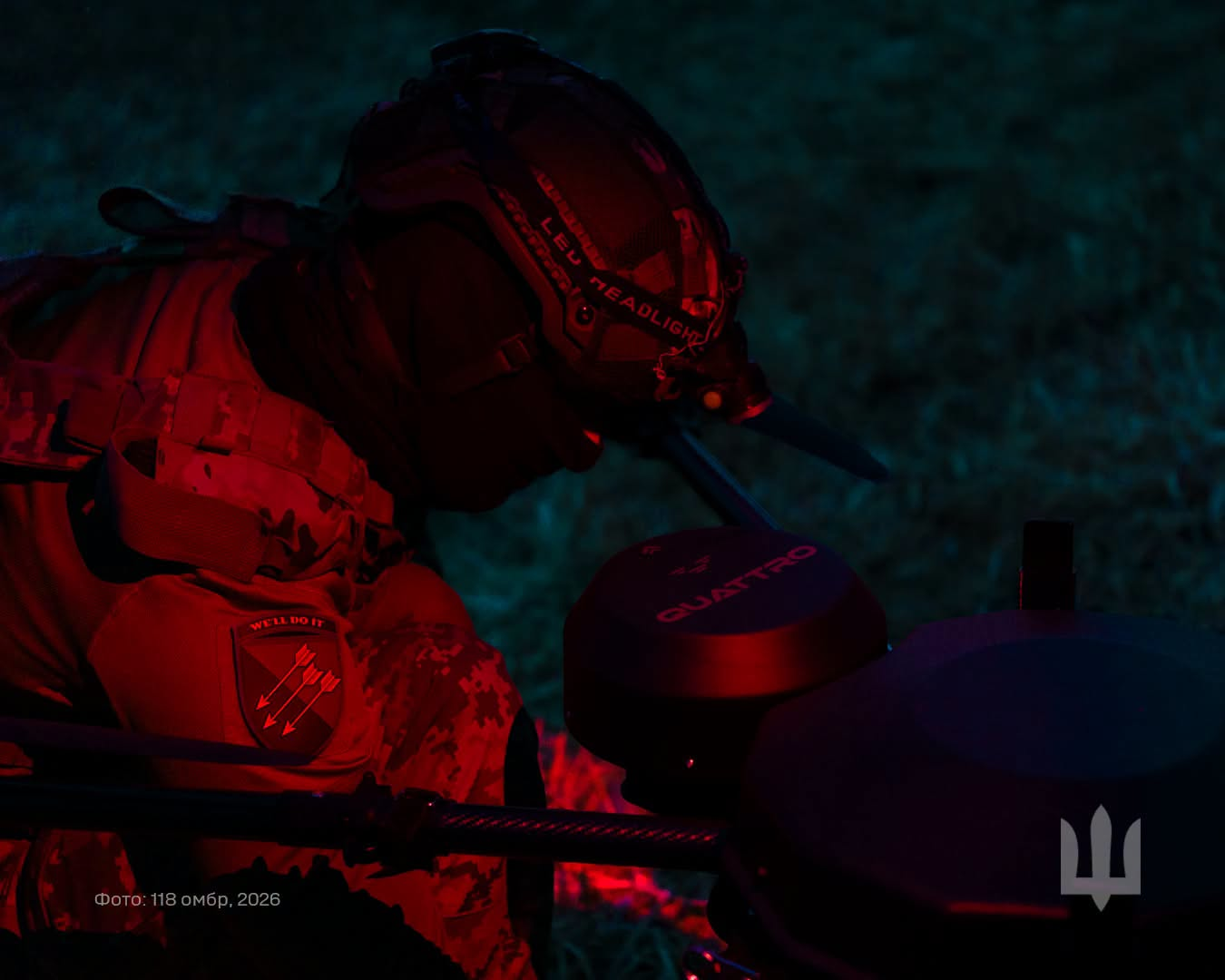
Soldier Brigade preparing a UAV at night

The unit was created for the Ukrainian summer offensive in Zaporizhzhia Oblast in 2023 and is part of 10th Army Corps. At least part of the brigade was trained by NATO forces in Romania. In lead up to the counteroffensive the Brigade would be equipped with M109A6 155mm self-propelled howitzers.

The 118th Mechanized Brigade has helped to develop new drone technology. In October 2024 in the southern area of the Zaporizhzhia Oblast droner operators successfully tested a new quadcopter on advancing Russian soldiers. In December 2024, battalion and company commanders of 118th Mechanized Brigade met with President Volodymyr Zelenskyy to discuss training and use of drones of mobilized soldiers.

In August 2025, the second company of the 23rd Reconnaissance Battalion effectively used an Unmanned Ground Vehicle to help rescue and evacuate a wounded soldier.

== Structure ==
- 118th Mechanized Brigade
  - Headquarters & Headquarters Company
    - 1st Mechanized Battalion
    - 2nd Mechanized Battalion
    - 3rd Mechanized Battalion
    - Motorized Battalion
    - Tank Battalion
    - Unmanned Systems Battalion
    - Artillery Group
      - Headquarters and Target Acquisition Battery
      - 1st Artillery Divizion
      - 2nd Artillery Divizion
      - Rocket Artillery Battery
      - Anti-Tank Battery
      - Maintenance Company
      - Logistics Company
      - Signals Battalion
      - CBRN Company
    - Anti-Aircraft Defense Divizion
    - Engineer Battalion
    - Logistic Battalion
    - Maintenance Battalion
    - Reconnaissance Company
    - EW Company
    - Signal Company
    - Radar Company
    - Medical Company
