= 17th Army Corps (Ukraine) =

Ukrainian Ground Forces formation

- 17 армійський корпус
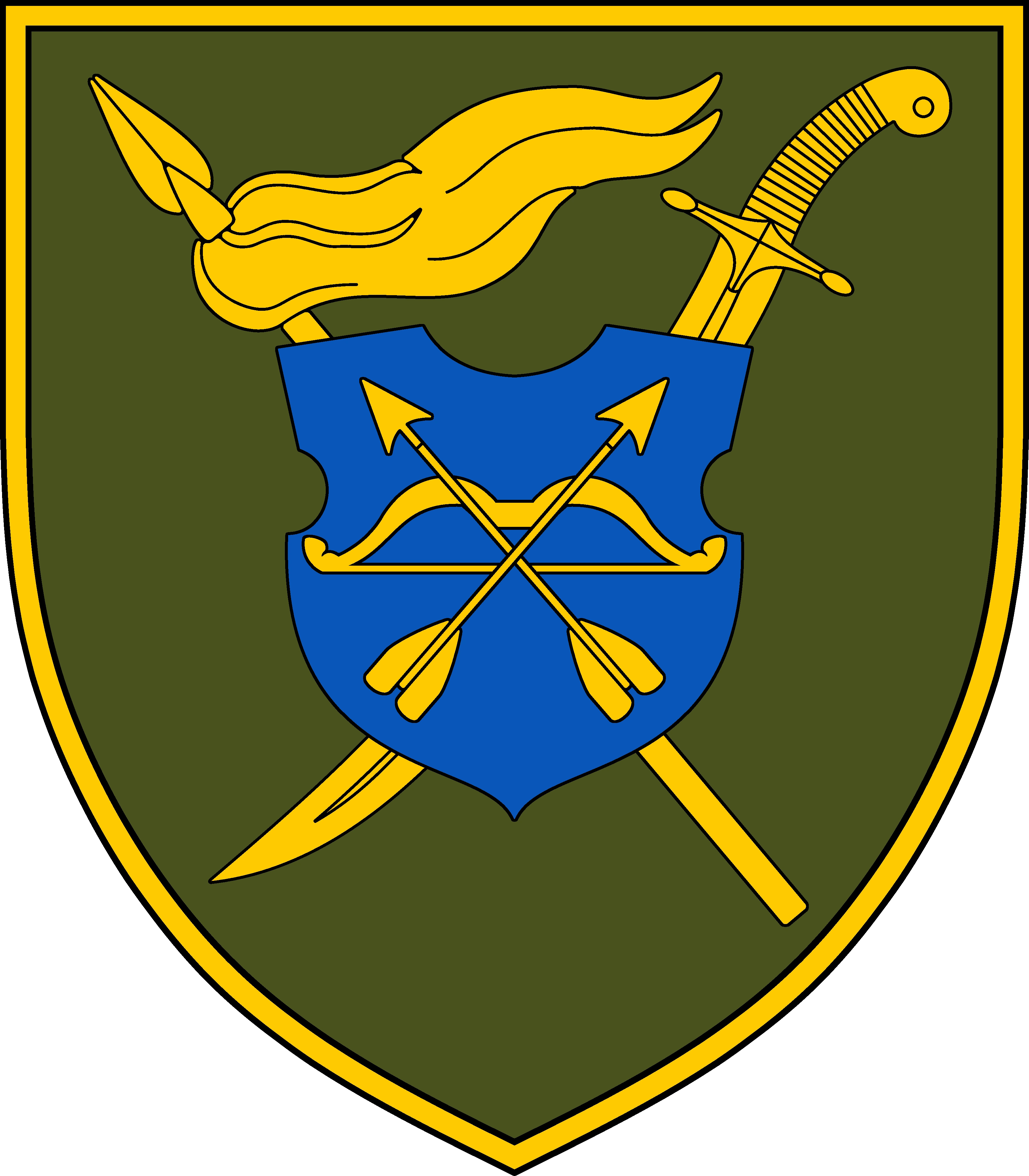
- Insignia of the corps
- Active: 2025–present
- Country: Ukraine
- Branch: Ukrainian Ground Forces
- Size: 40,000–80,000
- Garrison/HQ: Zaporizhzhia, Zaporizhzhia Oblast
- Motto: "Fortune Favors the Brave"
- Engagements: Russo-Ukrainian War
- Website: Official Facebook page

Commanders
- Notable commanders: Volodmyr Silenko (until September 2025)

The 17th Army Corps (Ukrainian: 17 армійський корпус) is a Corps of the Ukrainian Ground Forces.

== History ==
The 17th Army Corps is a military unit formed as part of Ukraine's ongoing defense reforms. These reforms aim to improve command structures and operational readiness amid ongoing conflicts.

It was reported in August 2025 that the 17th Corps's units were holding the defense of the Zaporizhzhia front, and that it was meant to replace Ukraine's Zaporizhzhia operational-tactical group.

According to Ukrainska Pravda, in September 2025, corps commander Volodymyr Silenko was removed from his post for the loss of positions in the corps' area of responsibility.

== Structure ==
As of 2025 the corps structure is as follows:

- 17th Army Corps
  - Corps Headquarters
    - Management
    - Commandant Platoon
  - 7th Recon Battalion
  - 54th Artillery Brigade
  - 65th Mechanized Brigade
  - 101st Anti-Tank Battalion
  - 108th Territorial Defense Brigade
  - 110th Mechanized Brigade
  - 118th Mechanized Brigade
  - 124th Communications Battalion
  - 128th Mountain Assault Brigade
  - 128th Heavy Mechanized Brigade
  - 151st Mechanized Brigade
  - 186th Material Support Battalion
  - 241st Territorial Defense Brigade
  - 422nd Unmanned Systems Battalion
  - 514th Repair and Restoration Battalion
