= Air National Guard (Ukraine) =

- Гвардійська авіаційна база НГ (Ukrainian)
- Air National Guard Insignia
- Founded: 1992
- Country: Ukraine
- Allegiance: Ministry of Internal Affairs
- Branch: National Guard of Ukraine
- Type: Air National Guard
- Role: Aviation
- Part of: National Guard Command
- Garrison/HQ: Oleksandriia
- Engagements: Transnistrian War; 1992–94 Crimean crisis Russo-Ukrainian war: War in Donbas; Russian invasion of Ukraine

Commanders
- Current commander: Colonel Vitaliy Volodymyrovych Buldovich

Insignia
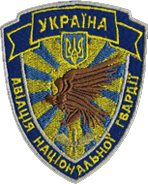
- Former Insignia

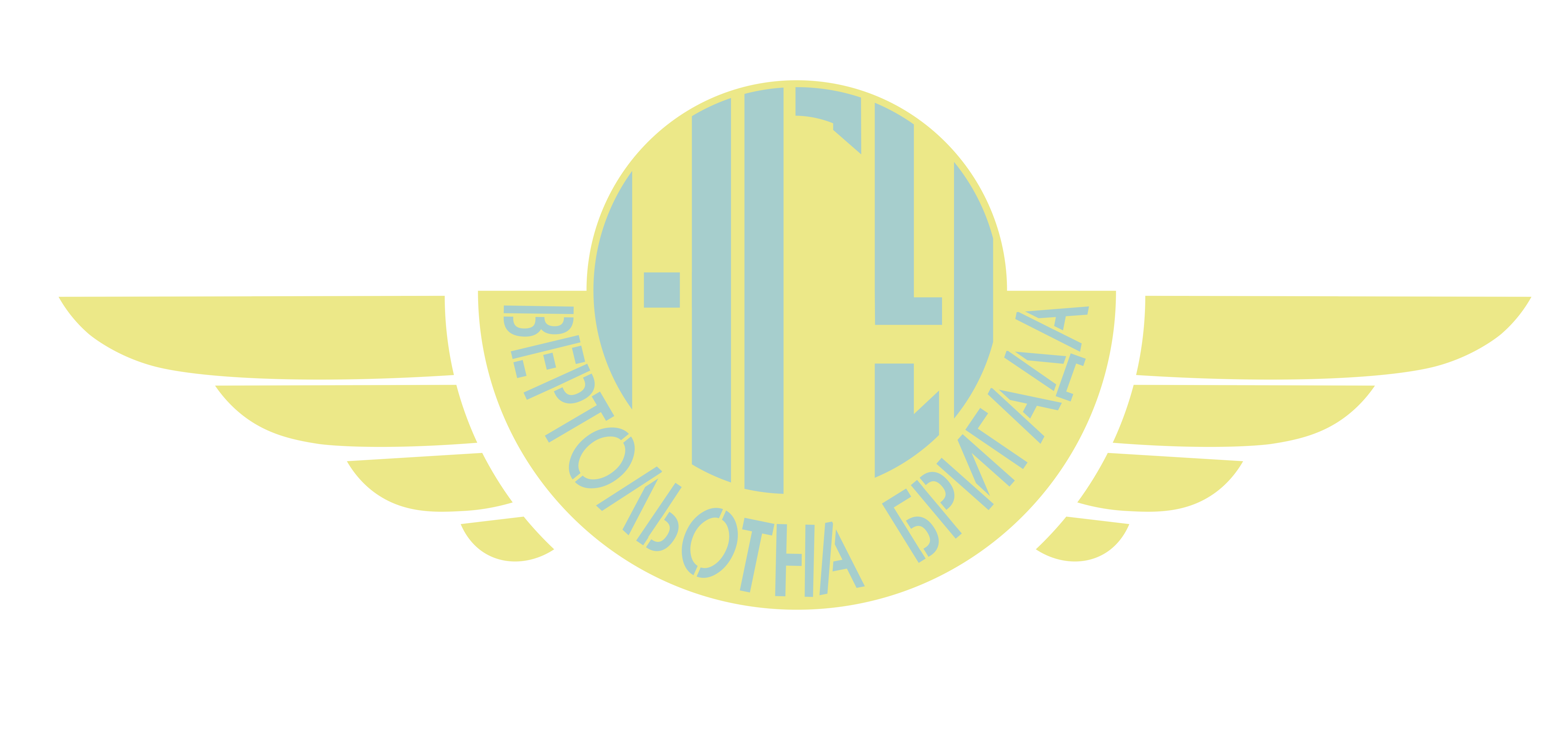
- Former Insignia

Aircraft flown
- Cargo helicopter: Mi-8T/MT/МSB, Eurocopter EC225 Super Puma
- Utility helicopter: Mil Mi-2MSB, Eurocopter AS350 Écureuil
- Transport: An-26, An-72V/P, An-74, Tu-134

The Air National Guard is the aerial component of the National Guard of Ukraine tasked with all aviation related operations of the National Guard. It was established in 1992 and has seen combat during the Transnistrian war, War in Donbass and the Russian invasion of Ukraine. It operates a variety of rotary wing, fixed wing and unmanned aircraft. Headquartered in Oleksandriia.

== History ==
The aviation department of the National Guard of Ukraine was established on 1 January 1992, with Mymka Lubomyr Volodymyrovych becoming its first commander. The Aviation units of the National Guard of Ukraine were merged into a single helicopter brigade. This brigade was created on the basis of the 51st Guards Separate Helicopter Regiment of the Internal Troops of the Soviet Union with Colonel Bondarchuk Vyacheslav Mykolayovych being appointed as the first commander of the brigade. It included two Mi-6 transport squadrons, two Mi-8T/MT/S/PS, Mi-9 transport and combat squadrons and 31 Mi-24B/K/R/P squadrons. In total the Air Guard had 72 helicopters.

In the summer of 1992, during the Transnistrian war, 14 Mil Mi-8 and Mil Mi-24 helicopters were deployed to provide air support at the Ukrainian-Moldovan border. Four Mi-8s and one Mi-24 were also deployed to the Vapnyarka and Krasnoy Vikna for rear support. The helicopters were engaged in transportation of troops, air patrols and logistical support.

On 1 August 1992, it became the 51st Separate Helicopter Brigade. In March 1993, 88 fishermen were carried away by the ice in the Kremenchuk Reservoir, which were rescued by the helicopters of the brigade.

During the 1992–94 Crimean crisis, the National Guard of Ukraine deployed a large contingent of over 60,000 personnel to Crimea, the deployment also included aircraft of the 51st Helicopter Brigade.

In 1996, the Mil Mi-6 helicopters of the brigade took part in large-scale exercises at the Yavoriv training ground, taking part in the transport and evacuation of personnel as well as GAZ-3307 vehicles.

In 1998, more than a thousand residents of Zakarpattia Oblast had to be evacuated after severe flooding. On 2 November 1998, 2 Mi-8MT and one Mi-8T flew from Oleksandriia to Uzhgorod, the helicopters were commanded by Lieutenant Colonels Klymenko, Strygin, and Major Kovtun while Colonel Anatoly Mykolayovych Sulima commanded the group. They had to go above the mountains up to 1,600 meters high, in populated areas, where food and medicine were urgently needed to be delivered. In the early days, the crews worked from Uzhgorod, but the flight took an hour so they were transferred to Tiachiv, reducing the flight time to 15–20 minutes, soon ground vehicles were able to reach the area, decreasing the load on aviation. One Mi-8MT was converted into a medevac helicopter and deployed to Chornotysov. During the 19 days of the mission, the Air Guard helicopters had a flight time of 117 hours, transported 94,370 tons of various equipment and 649 people including 72 needing medical assistance.

On 17 December 1999, it became a part of the Internal Troops of Ukraine. On 26 April 2000, a monument was consecrated at the headquarters of the brigade in honor of the liquidators of the Chernobyl incident with the inscription "You closed the whole world." On 19 December 2000, the Mil Mi-6 helicopters were retired from the brigade.

In 2014, the brigade again became a part of the National Guard of Ukraine renamed as the Air National Guard of Ukraine. On 29 May 2014, during the Siege of Sloviansk, after unloading food and personnel at a checkpoint, and while returning from Mount Karachun, an Mi-8MT helicopter of the National Guard was shot by a MANPAD, causing the blast of its fuel tanks killing the commander of National Guard, Serhii Kulchitskyi, two officers of the Air Guard, pilot Colonel Buldovych Serhiy Ivanovich and flight engineer Captain Kravchenko Sergey Mykolayovych, three other National Guard servicemen and six Berkut personnel. The copilot, Captain Oleksandr Mykolayovych Makeyenko survived but was seriously wounded. In Autumn 2014, Athlon Avia A1-CM Furia UAVs were delivered to the Air Guard. On 22 July 2015, Athlon Avia A1-CM Furia UAVs were officially adopted by the Air Guard. On 24 August 2015, during the "Independence March" parade, the Air Guard was presented its new Colours replacing the former Soviet and 1990s designs with a ceremony taking place on 29 August, the "Aviation Day". In 2016, the Air National Guard started operating Polish-manufactured "Fly eye" reconnaissance UAVs. On 14 October 2016, the open-air Mil Mi-6 helicopter museum was opened at the Air Guard Headquarters by the mayor of Oleksandria, Stepan Tsapyuk. From 2014 to 2019, the Air Guard received an Antonov An-26, an Antonov An-72, three Mil Mi-8 and two Mi-2MSB. A squadron of Unmanned Aerial Vehicles was established which received "Fly-eye", A1-CM/KS-1 Furia, RQ-11B Raven, and MARA-2M UAVs. In 2018, Eurocopter AS350 Écureuil helicopters were also purchased for the Air Guard. On 21 December 2018, the Air Guard received its first Eurocopter EC225 Super Puma, followed by a second Eurocopter EC225 Super Puma in December 2019.

On 15 April 2022, during the Russian invasion of Ukraine, Russian forces conducted a missile attack on the airfield of the Air Guard causing casualties, there were multiple wounded, and an officer, Captain Oleg Anatoliyovych Zabolotnyi was killed as a result of the missile strike.

== Structure ==
The structure of the Air Guard is as follows:

- Air National Guard
  - Headquarters and HQ Battalion, Air National Guard of Ukraine
  - 1st Helicopter Aviation Squadron (Mi-8T/MT/МSB, Eurocopter EC225 Super Puma)
  - 2nd Helicopter Aviation Squadron (Mil Mi-8T/MT/МSB, Mil Mi-2MSB, Eurocopter AS350 Écureuil)
  - 3rd Fixed-wing Aviation Squadron (Antonov An-26, Antonov An-72V/P, Antonov An-74, Tupolev Tu-134)
  - 4th Unmanned Aerial Vehicle Squadron (Flyeye, RQ-11B Raven, A1-CM/KS-1 Furia, MARA-2M, BpAK P-100)
  - Operational Support Component
  - Airfield Technical Support Battalion
    - Logistical Support Company
    - Guardian Company
  - Signal Battalion
    - Communications and Radio Technical Flight Support Company
  - Medical Center
  - Band of the Air National Guard of Ukraine

== Commanders ==
- Colonel Bondarchuk Vyacheslav Mykolayovych (1992-?)
- Colonel Pobyvanets Gennadiy Yuriyovych (2014–2015)
- Colonel Yakovlev Ruslan Petrovych (2015–2019)
- Colonel Vitaliy Volodymyrovych Buldovich (2019-)

== Aircraft ==
Model	Image	Origin	Type	Number	Details
Aircraft
Antonov An-26		Soviet Union; Ukraine	Transport	20	
Antonov An-72		Soviet Union; Ukraine	Transport	2	
Antonov An-74		Soviet Union; Ukraine	Transport	N/A	
Tupolev Tu-134		Soviet Union	Transport	2	
Helicopters
Mil Mi-2		Poland; Ukraine	Utility	1	Upgraded to the Mi-2MSB standard.
Mil Mi-8		USSR	Transport	7	
Airbus Helicopters H125		France	Utility	2	
Airbus Helicopters H215		France	Medium utility helicopter		
Airbus H225		France	Transport	4	
Unmanned aerial vehicles
BpAK P-100		Ukraine	Multi-purpose		
Fly-eye		Poland; Ukraine	Reconnaissance		
RQ-11 Raven		United States	SUAV		
A1-CM/KS-1 Furia		Ukraine	Reconnaissance		
MARA-2M		Ukraine			

== Sources ==
- Вертолеты Ми-8 Армейской Авиации, Воздушных Сил и Национальной Гвардии Украины. Часть 1
- В/ч 2269 Национальной гвардии Украины (Александрия)
- Церемония замены знамени в александрийской ВЧ 2269
- Авіатори Гвардійської авіаційної бази відзначили День захисника України
- Річниця формування і день пам'яті по загиблим пілотам.
- Олександрія. Церемонія прийняття присяги у в\ч 2269 Національної гвардії України
- Генерал-лейтенант Микола Балан проінспектував проведення парашутно-десантних зборів у Олександрії
- Гвардійська авіаційна база НГУ
- Гвардія у повітрі
- Авіація Національної гвардії України (4К)
- В Олександрії відкрили меморіал 5 загиблим вертолітникам
- Десант нацгвардії успішно виконав завдання у небі
- Олександрійські авіатори удосконалюють льотну майстерність в Карпатських горах
- У військовій частині 2269 проходить збір парашутистів
- У військовій частині 2269 проходить збір парашутистів
- "У Ніжині створять сервісний центр для гелікоптерів Airbus". ukrmilitary.com. Ukrainian Military Pages. 2018-09-25. Archived from the original on 25 September 2018.
- International Institute for Strategic Studies (15 February 2023). The Military Balance 2023 (1st ed.). Routledge. p. 204. ISBN 978-1032508955.
