= Zoopark-1 =

Russian counter-battery radar system

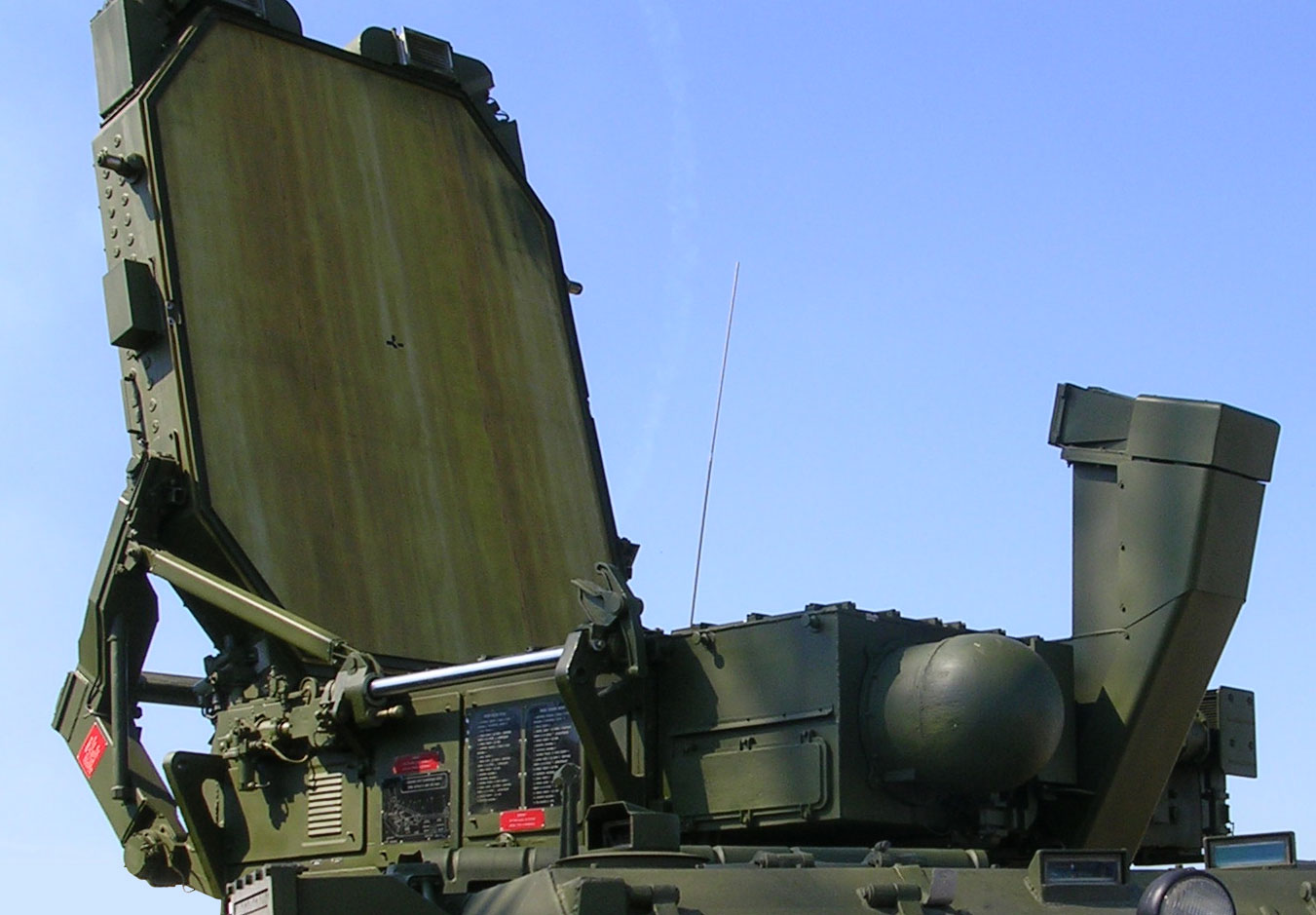
Zoopark-1

Zoopark-1 (Russian: Зоопарк, lit. 'zoo'; GRAU index 1L219) is a counter-battery radar system developed by Almaz-Antey for the Soviet Armed Forces from the late 1970s. Zoopark-1 deploys a mobile active electronically scanned array radar (based on a tracked MT-LBu chassis) for the purpose of enemy field-artillery acquisition. The system can detect:

- mortar shells at a distance of up to 20 kilometers
- artillery shells at a distance of up to 30 kilometers
- ground-to-air rockets at a distance of up to 50 kilometers
- moving ground-targets at a distance of up to 40 kilometers

determining location of origin of a fire.

Zoopark-1 reached initial operating status in 1989. The later 1L260 / 1L261 variant has received the designation Zoopark‑1M.

== Gallery ==
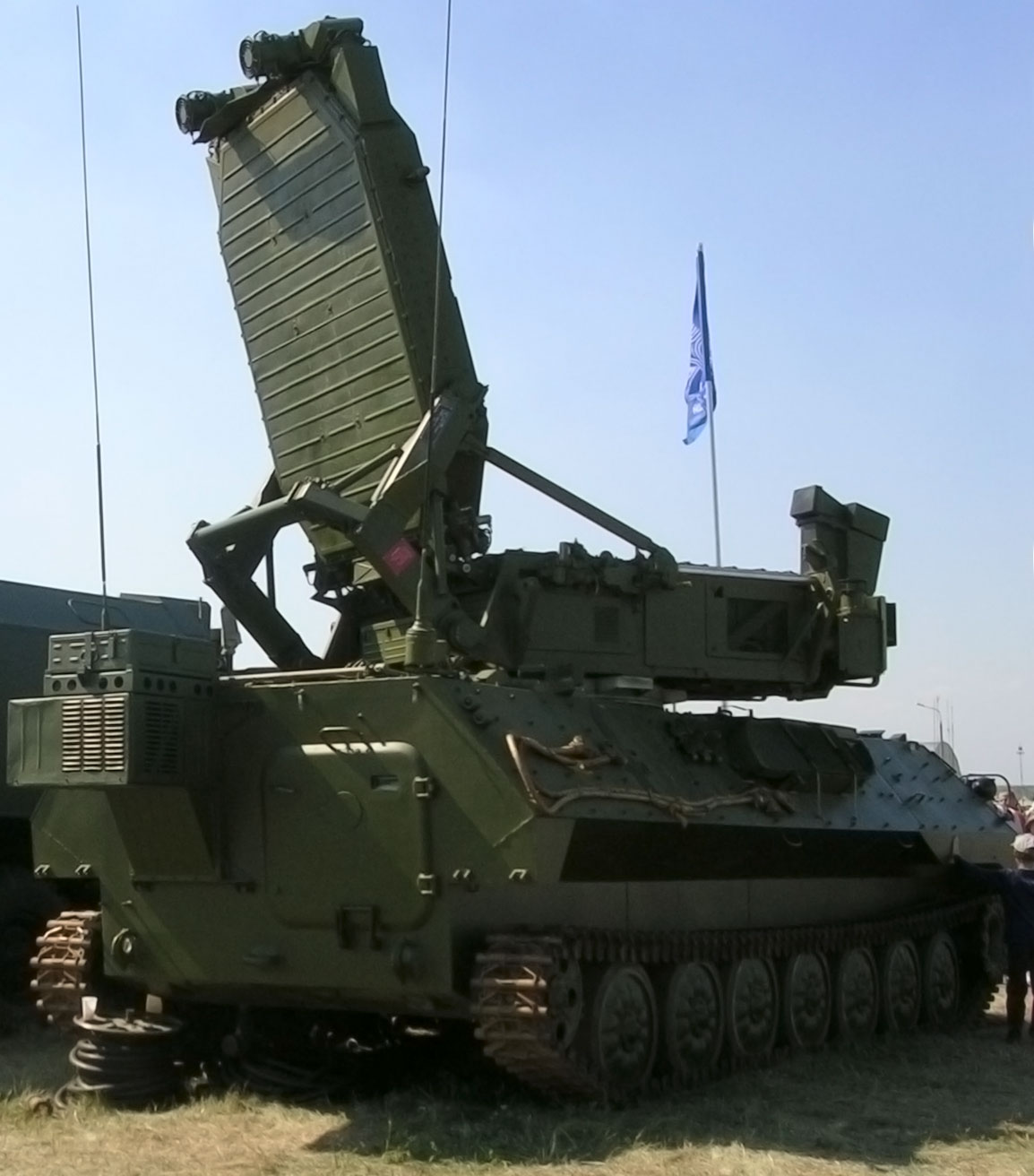
Back view of 1L219M radar at the MAKS2005 airshow

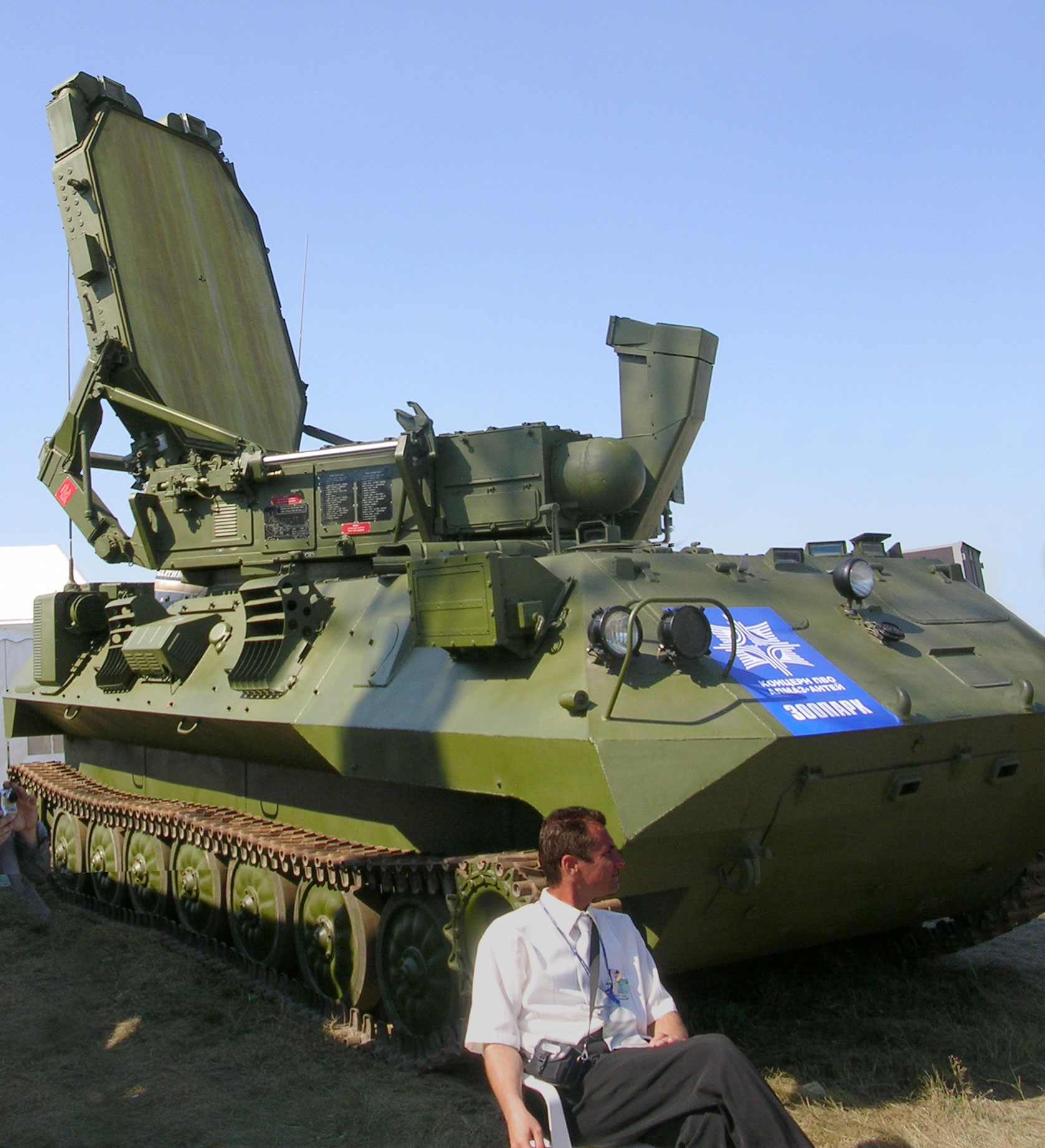
1L219M radar at the MAKS-2005 airshow

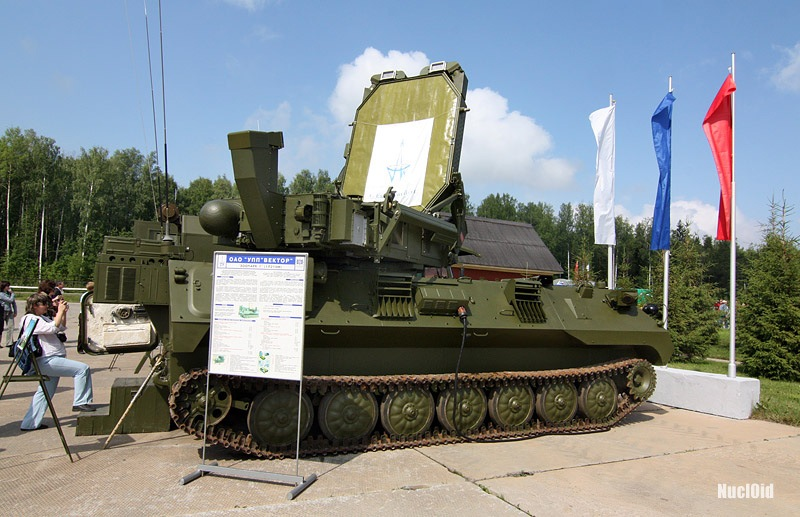
1L219M "Zoopark" radar at Russian Expo Arms 2009 in Nizhny Tagil

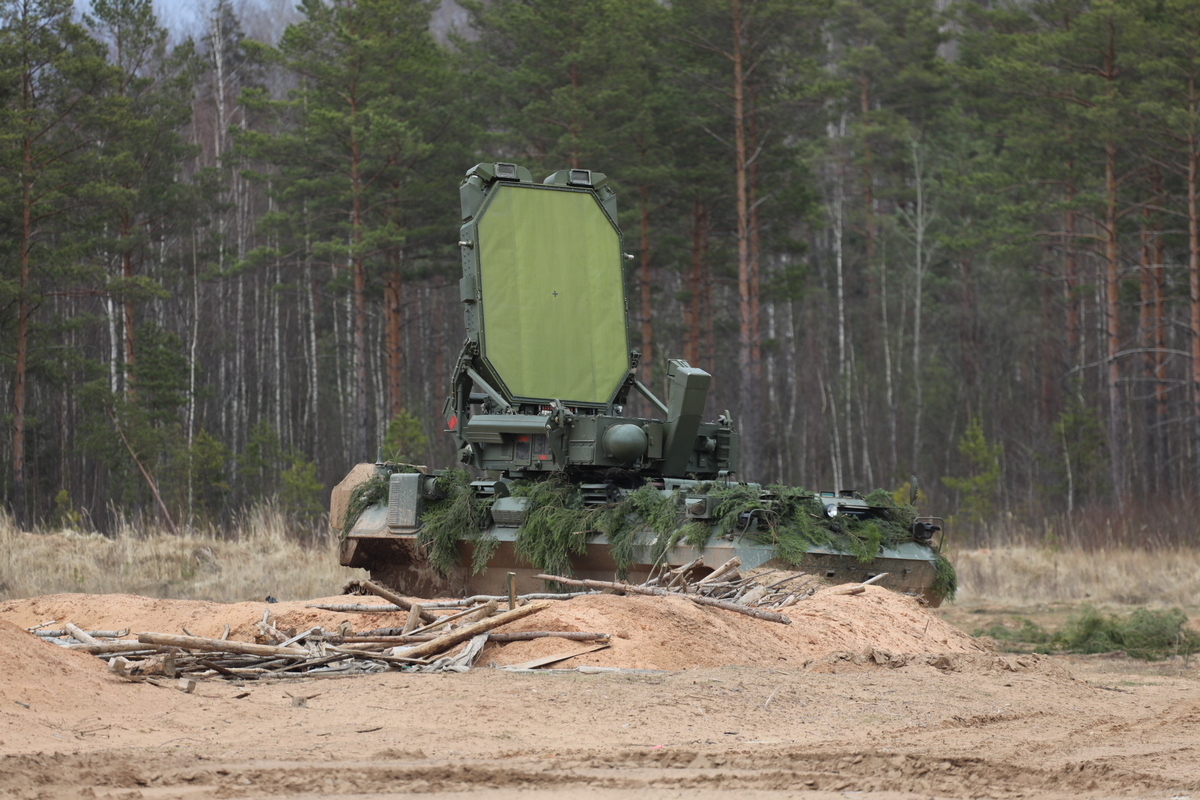
9th Guards Artillery Brigade's 2S19 Msta-S firing with Zoopark radar system

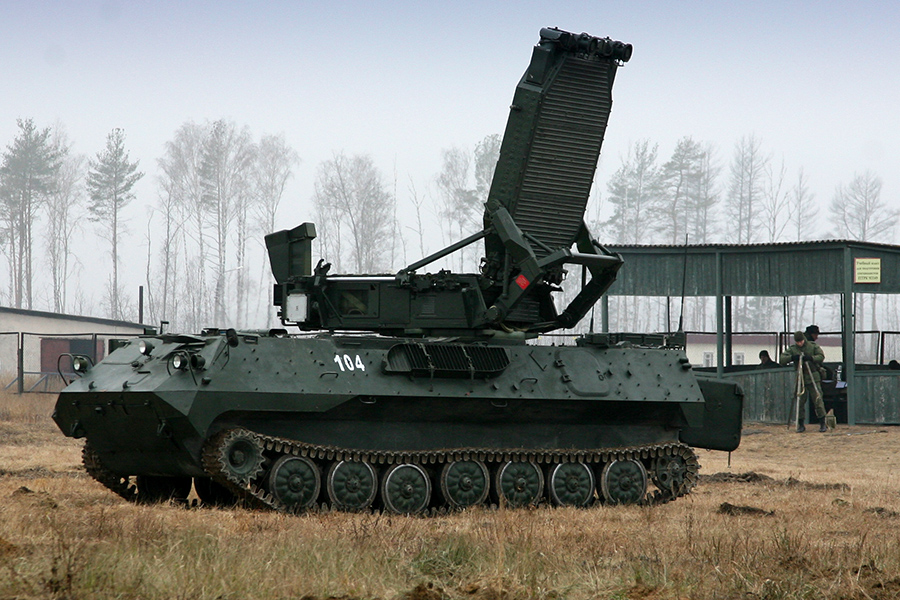
1000th Training Center of Rocket and Artillery Troops. 1L219 Zoopark radar

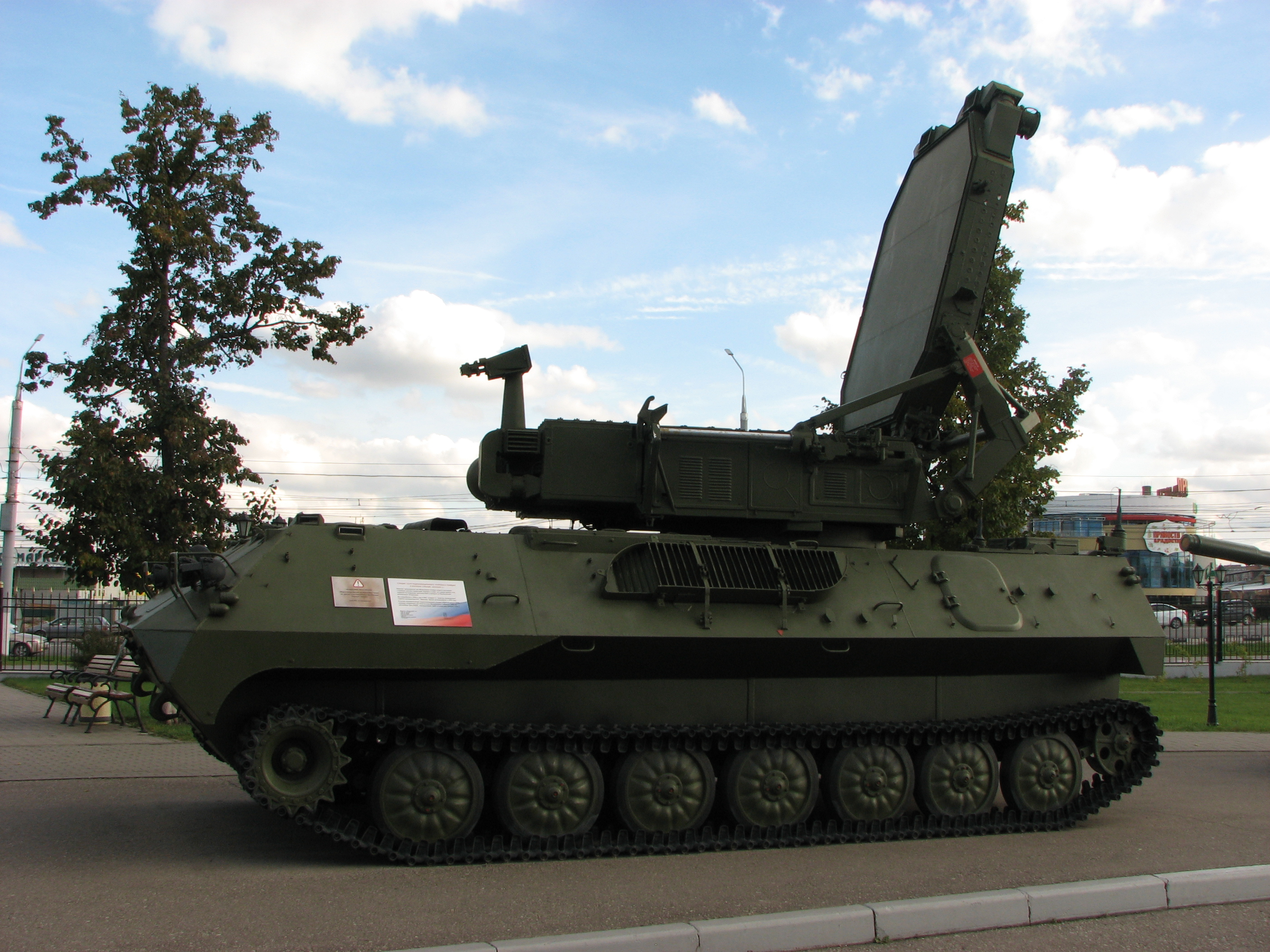
Radar complex for reconnaissance and fire control (counter-battery radar) 1L219 Zoo-1 (Tula, Museum of Weapons)

== See also ==
- Penicillin (counter-artillery system)
- AN/TPQ-36 Firefinder radar
- AN/TPQ-37 Firefinder radar
- Swathi Weapon Locating Radar
- Aistyonok
- COBRA (radar)
