= Zaur Nudiraliyev =

Azerbaijani military officer (1978–2020)

- Native name: Zaur İsmayıl oğlu Nudirəliyev
- Born: Zaur Ismayil oglu Nudiraliyev; September 1, 1978; Baku, Azerbaijani SSR, Soviet Union
- Died: October 4, 2020 (aged 42) Jabrayil, Jabrayil District, Azerbaijan
- Buried: Second Alley of Honor
- Allegiance: Azerbaijani Armed Forces
- Branch: Azerbaijani Air Force
- Service years: 2000–2020
- Rank: Colonel
- Commands: 1st Aviation Squadron
- Conflicts: Second Nagorno-Karabakh War; Aras Valley campaign
- Awards: "For Faultless Service" medal; Hero of the Patriotic War Medal
- Education: Jamshid Nakhchivanski Military Lyceum; Turkish Air Force Academy
- Children: 2

Zaur Ismayil oglu Nudiraliyev (Azerbaijani: Zaur İsmayıl oğlu Nudirəliyev; 1 September 1978 – 4 October 2020) was an Azerbaijani military officer, colonel who served in the Air Forces of the Azerbaijani Armed Forces. He had participated in the 2020 Nagorno-Karabakh war, and was killed during the Aras Valley campaign. Nudiraliyev had received the title of the Hero of the Patriotic War.

== Early life and education ==
Zaur Ismayil oglu Nudiraliyev was born on 1 September 1978, in Baku, capital of the then Azerbaijani SSR, Soviet Union. In 1985, he entered the secondary school No. 192 in Zabrat of Sabunchu District, where he studied until 1992. From 1992 to 1995, he continued his education at the Military Lyceum named after Jamshid Nakhchivanski. Nudiraliyev entered the Turkish Air Force Academy in 1995 and graduated from there in 2000 with a degree in aviation.

== Military service ==
From February 2000 to July 2004, Zaur Nudiraliyev served as a pilot in the Azerbaijani 3rd Air Squadron's flight of the Military Unit N, and from July 2004 to December 2004, he was the chief pilot of the same flight. From December 2004 to March 2007, Nudiraliyev served as the chief pilot of the Azerbaijani 1st Air Squadron's flight in the Military Unit N, and from March 2007 to December 2009, he was the flight commander in the same air squadron. From December 2009 to May 2011, he served as Deputy Commander-Navigator of the 1st Aviation Squadron in the Military Unit N. Nudiraliyev was the Chief of Staff of the 1st Aviation Squadron in the Military Unit N from May 2011 to November 2013, and from November 2013 to August 2015, he was the Chief of Staff of the Military Unit N. He was the commander of the 1st Aviation Squadron. Nudiraliyev served as Deputy Flight Training Commander and Head of Flight Planning Division of the Military Unit N since August 2015.

=== 2020 Nagorno-Karabakh war ===
Zaur Nudiraliyev, as a colonel, flew Su-25 attack aircraft of the Azerbaijani Air Forces during the 2020 Nagorno-Karabakh war, which began on 27 September 2020. According to the Azerbaijani military officials, during the opening days of the war, Nudiraliyev flew combat missions supporting the Madagiz offensive and the Aras Valley campaign, often flying the Su-25 aircraft at its design ceiling to avoid Armenian air defence systems. On 4 October, while approaching Armenian positions in Jabrayil, the Azerbaijani intelligence warned Nudiraliyev flight about active Armenian air defence systems in the area, requesting the pilots to return to base, however Nudiraliyev opted for pushing on with the attack mission, bombing the Armenians positions. The Su-25 he was piloting was hit. The ejection seat was not activated and Nudiraliyev died on impact. He was buried in the Second Alley of Honor.

== Personal life ==
Zaur Nudiraliyev was married and had 2 children.

== Awards ==
- Nudiraliyev was awarded the title of the Hero of the Patriotic War on 9 December 2020, by the decree of the President of Azerbaijan, Ilham Aliyev.
