= Athlon Avia A1-CM Furia =

Ukrainian hand-launched reconnaissance drone

A1-CM Furia
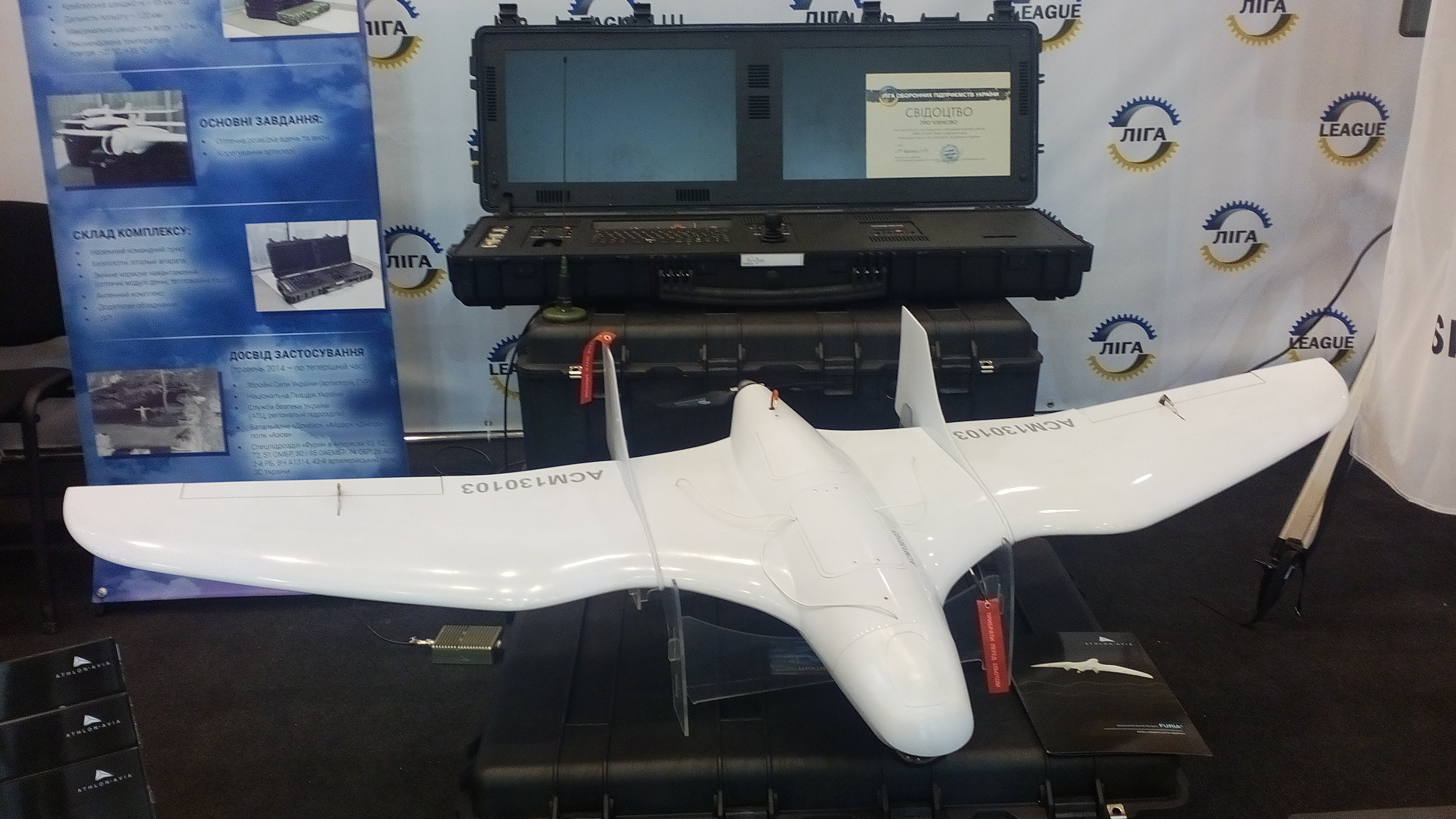
- Furia UAVs

General information
- Type: Reconnaissance UAV
- National origin: Ukraine
- Manufacturer: Athlon Avia
- Primary user: Armed Forces of Ukraine

History
- Introduction date: 2020
- First flight: 2014

A1-CM Furia (Ukrainian: Фурія) — is a Ukrainian hand-launched, unmanned aerial vehicle (UAV) designed for aerial reconnaissance. It is controlled using a dedicated rectangular, guitar-case sized, portable station (displayed behind UAV in photo).

== History ==
It made its first flight in 2014 and was commissioned by the Air Guard of Ukraine in 2015 and Armed Forces of Ukraine in 2020. A1-CM Furia UAVs are used in the 2022 Russian invasion of Ukraine.

== Capabilities ==
According to the Ukrainian Ministry of Defence, its latest modification, the A1-CMX, is able to correlate and pinpoint visual map data with GPS and GLONASS coordinates in realtime, and can reliably beam a laser target designator up to 7 km away onto an area of 2x2m - even in harsh weather conditions. The CMX version was dubbed a new "Wunderwaffe" in the fight against Russia due to its ability to give final guidance correction to the M982 Excalibur artillery shells.

== Design ==
Airframe is based on the RVJet RC plane by RangeVideo.

Analysis of destroyed versions that floated on Russian social-network VK at the end of August 2023 showed custom FPGA and NVIDIA chips on tailor-made motherboards and daughterboards, expensive industrial grade ball-bearings, multiple 830/905nm laser range finders and laser designators as well as precision electric motors and stepper-motors from Northrop Grumman Corporation, Honeywell International Inc., L-3 Technologies, and ABB.

Features included multi-band long-range digital radio, backup gyroscopes, designated chipsets for satellite reception and a secondary high-resolution IR camera. Almost all electronic parts were enclosed in individual hardened shock-proof casings with Mu-metal EMI and RFI shielding. Members of the Russian hacker-group Killnet commented that they were "severely impressed" and attributed "high quality" and "an obvious technological advantage".

The A1-CMX is claimed to have assisted in precision strikes to destroy over 43 Russian tanks and 181 assorted armored and support vehicles during the first half of the Counter-Offensive in the Robotyne region alone. It was described by General Yevhen Moisiuk as an "absolute game changer“ that "leads to spotted targets getting destroyed in under 15 minutes at a 95% probability“.

Characteristic	A1-CM	A1-CMX
Introduced	2014	Early 2023
Type	Fixed Wing UAV	Fixed Wing UAV
Tasks	Reconnaissance	Reconnaissance
	Artillery Correction	Artillery Correction
		Precision Strike Guidance
Takeoff mass	5.5 kg	6kg
The maximum radius of interaction	< 50 km	< 55 km
Flight range	up to 200 km	up to 220km
Power unit	Electric motor	Electric motor
Feeding	2x 42000mAh Li-ion	2x 48000mAh & 1x 4000mAh Li-ion
Flight duration	up to 3 hours	up to 3 hours
Maximum speed	130 km/h	140 km/h
Cruise speed	65 km/h	70 km/h
Payload	HighRes Camera	Ultra-HighRes Camera
		Secondary HighRes IR Camera
		830nm Laser Distance Measurement
		905nm Laser Target Designator
Target Resolution	20m	<2m
Satellite Navigation	GPS	GPS & GLONASS
Target Tracking	Yes	Yes
AI Target Identification	No	Yes
GPU Chipset	Unknown	NVIDIA Jetson
Notable Features	Space for additional modular payload	Huge amount of high-end Western components, tailor made custom PCB‘s.
Estimated Unit Cost	25.000,- USD	>70.000,- USD
Units produced	400+	Unknown
