= R-330Zh Zhitel =

Russian jamming system

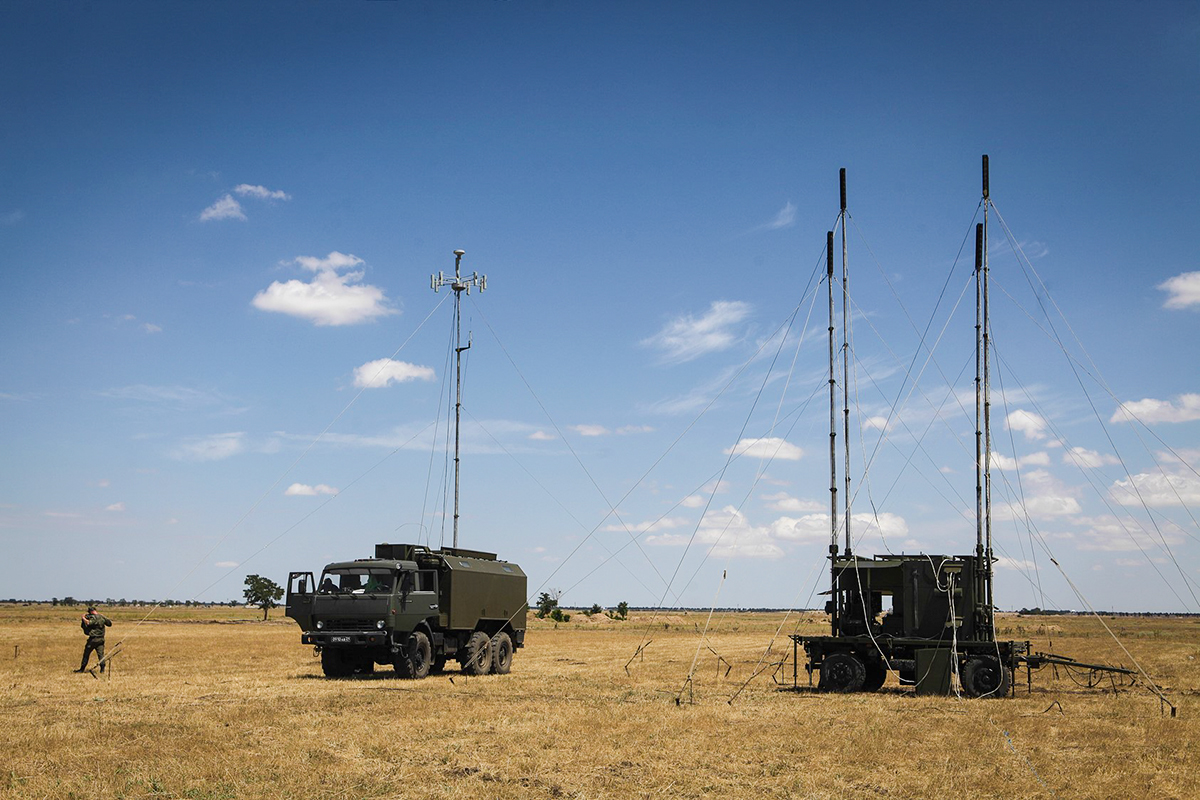
R-330Zh Zhitel ECW signal jammer, deployed on exercises

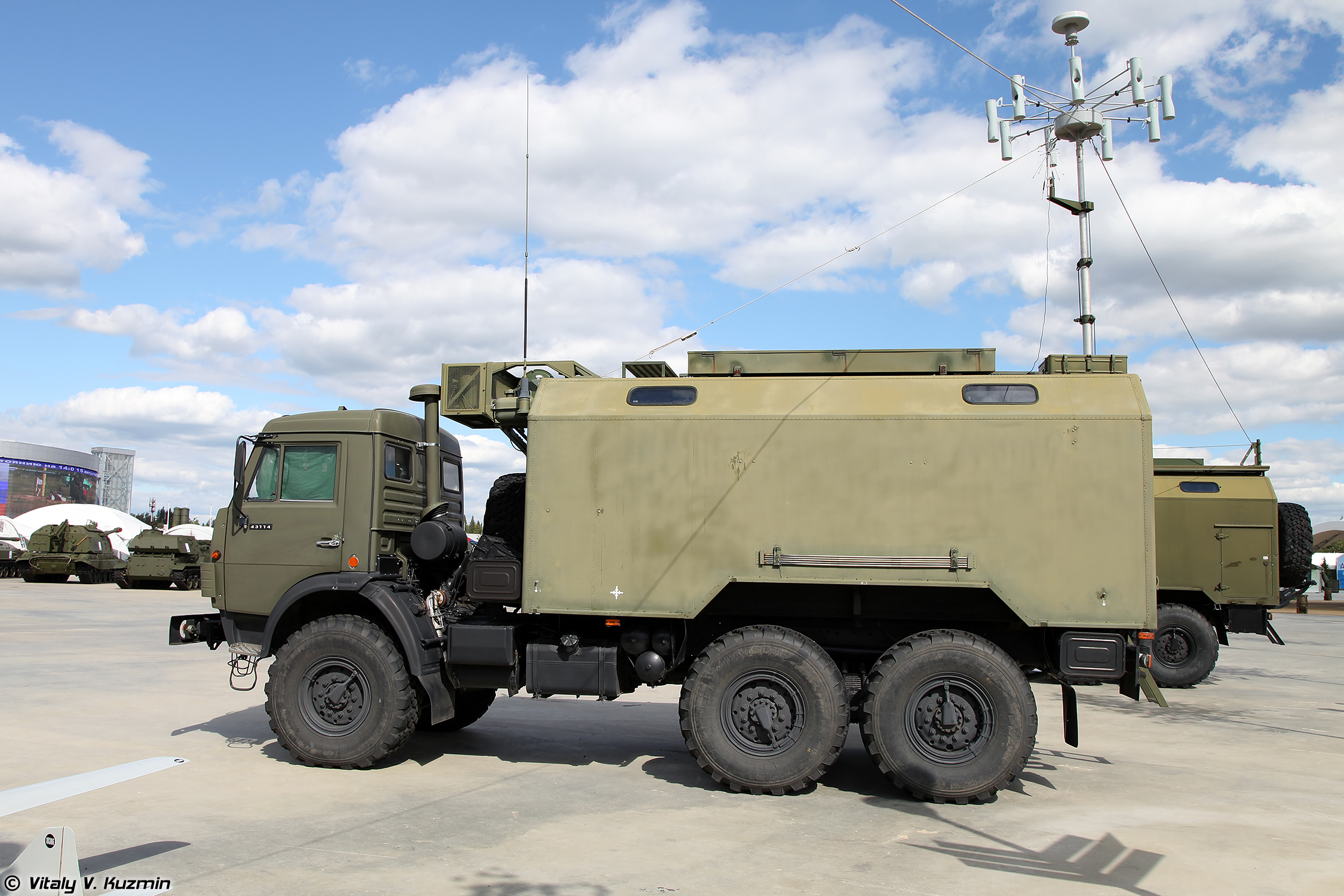
R-330Zh Zhitel ECW signal jammer, side view while parked at a military exhibition

The R-330Zh Zhitel is a mobile truck-mounted electronic warfare jamming communication station, manufactured by NVP Protek and fielded by the Armed Forces of the Russian Federation (AFRF). It is preferably deployed within range of the frontline, and is mounted on a Ural-43203 or KamAZ-43114 three-axle truck.

== System ==
One Zhitel system consists of two elements: a wheeled platform with an operator station for the reconnaissance system (0.1–2 GHz frequency range) and a trailer with emitters and antennas of the active jamming system. According to the official information, the system's purpose is to detect, track and jam the Inmarsat and Iridium satellite communications and GSM-1900 cellphones, and also to act against GPS navigation system utilizing the NAVSTAR satellites. Activation of the station jams all communications and navigation systems. Zhitel covers a waveband of 100 MHz to two gigahertz; this allows attack on both military and civilian communications; for example V/UHF UAV RF links in addition to GNSS satcom signals. The Zhitel system is designed to protect brigade- or division-level command posts against precision-guided munitions (PGMs). It is reportedly able to jam Inmarsat and Iridium satellite broadcasts within a limited region.

== History ==
The Zhitel system was allegedly employed during the 1996 assassination of the President of Ichkeria, Dzhokhar Dudayev.

The Zhitel system was allegedly used in the 2008 Russo-Georgian War.

In spring 2014 a Zhitel system was spotted on the road to Crimea, as well as in the Donbas region at various times over the pre-invasion War in Donbas period of the Russo-Ukrainian War.

In November 2018 difficulties with communications were reported in the Finnmark region of Norway and the Zhitel system was suspected.

In spring 2019 Zhitel systems were reported to be in the Donbas region of Ukraine. This was simultaneous with "a sharp uptick of drone losses" remarked by both the OSCE Special Monitoring Mission to Ukraine and the Ukrainian military. A Zhitel system was spotted by the OSCE SMMU near Luhansk city.

On 14 June 2019, Russia was reported to have trialled new techniques with its Zhitel systems, which were able to interfere with satellite communications equipment, navigation systems and mobile phones within a 30 km radius.

On 28 November 2020, during the War in Donbas, a Zhitel system was spotted by an OSCE drone, a few kilometres north-west of Kovske, Novoazovsk Raion of Donetsk Oblast of Ukraine, within reach of the border with the Russian Federation.

In 2021, the AFRF tried to use Zhitel systems to jam signals from RQ-4 drones.

In May 2022 the Ukrainians destroyed a Zhitel system by drone-targeted artillery.

In September 2022 the Zhitel system was reported to have jammed the AWACS E-3 Sentry and AEW E-2 Hawkeye airborne warning and control aircraft, which tried to locate Russian attack aircraft in flight.

On 26 September 2022, during the 2022 Russian invasion of Ukraine, a Zhitel system was destroyed somewhere in the Kharkiv region, with the aid of a Bayraktar TB-2 drone.

On 26 March 2023, Ukraine reported the destruction of a Zhitel system by drone-targeted artillery, by an M982 Excalibur PGM with the help of a targeting drone.

On 6 June 2023, the Royal United Services Institute (RUSI) presented a paper on the jamming of Joint Direct Attack Munitions (JDAMs) by Russian forces. The paper notes that the Russian R-330Zh Zhitel impacted GPS signals that JDAMs rely on. Having "travelled up to 10,900 nautical miles (20,200 km) from the satellite to Earth", the GPS signals can be weak when compared to those broadcast at ground level.

This directly affects the JDAM's accuracy which is its key selling point. When the target is small the JDAM must fall back on its Inertial Navigation System (INS). With GPS signals a JDAM, on open source figures, can hit within "5 m (16 ft) of a target or less". Relying on INS, the accuracy falls to "within 30 m (98 ft) of the target".

Ukrainian forces have been able to locate these jammers and hit them with "kinetic" attacks such as artillery. Some Russian EW units have been targeted and lost equipment.

The Zhitel can also effect the accuracy of HIMARS strikes, which has forced the US to modify the software for the GMLRS rockets fired by HIMARS.
