= Aistyonok =

Russian counter-battery radar system

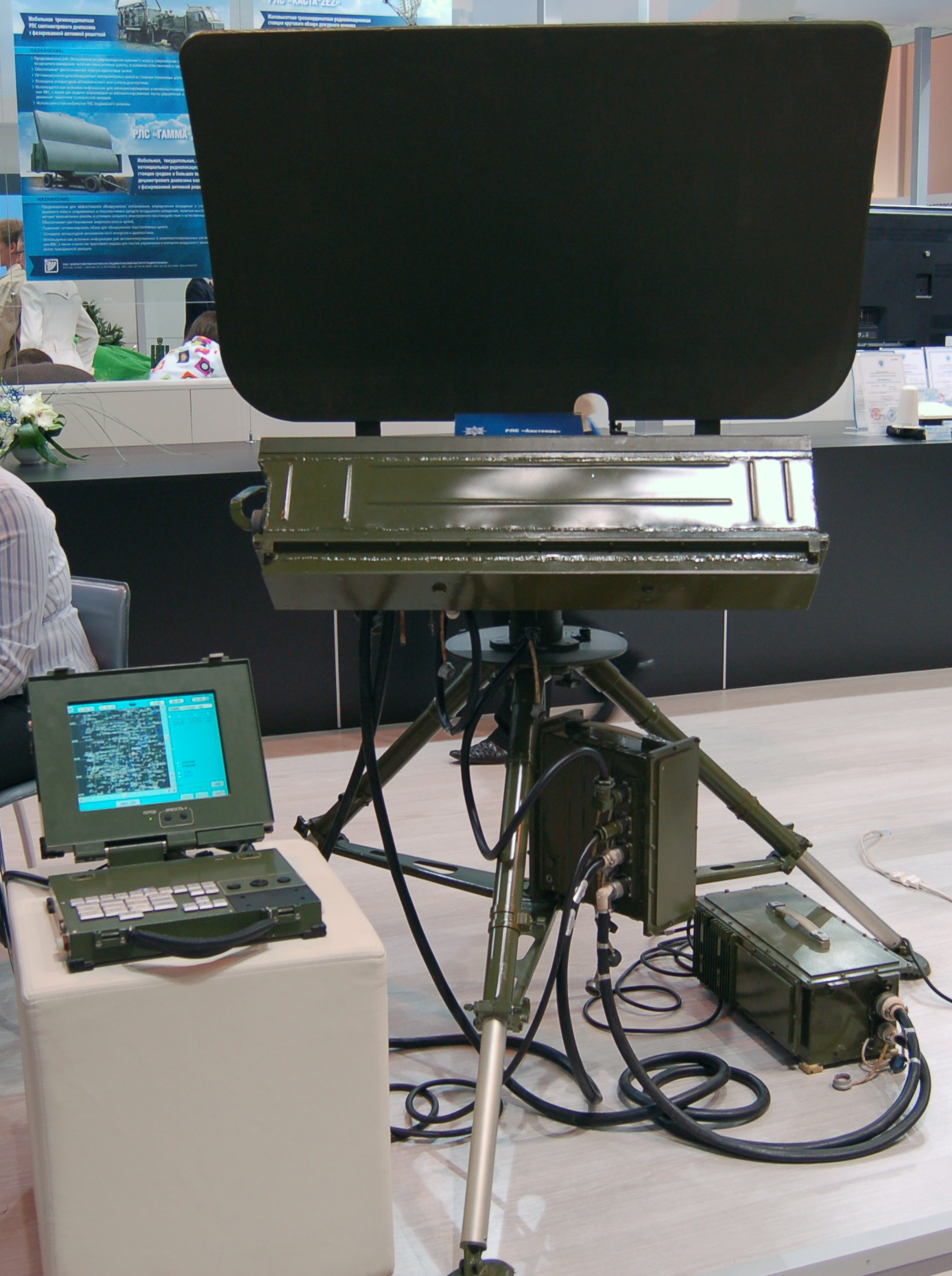
- Aistyonok on display in 2009
- Country of origin: Russia
- Manufacturer: Almaz-Antey
- Designer: Almaz-Antey
- Introduced: 2008
- Type: Counter-battery radar
- Range: 20 kilometres (12 mi)

Aistyonok (Russian: Аистёнок, Little Stork; GRAU designation 1L271) is a portable counter-battery radar system developed and produced by the state-owned Almaz-Antey corporation for the Russian Armed Forces.

It is a mobile radar for the purpose of detecting position of weapons such as field artillery and anti-aircraft weapons, calculating the trajectory of incoming shells, and the control of unmanned aerial vehicles. Aistyonok is claimed to detect moving ground targets at a distance of up to 20 kilometres (12 mi), with capabilities to detect mortar fire positions at a distance of up to 5 kilometres (3.1 mi), moving ground equipment at a distance of up to 20 kilometres (12 mi), and the adjustment of artillery fire from 5 kilometres (3.1 mi) to 15 kilometres (9.3 mi) depending on the conditions.

The Aistyonok system was debuted in 2008, and has since been introduced for limited use in the North Caucasus by the Russian Armed Forces. The counter-battery radar has also been used in the Russo-Ukrainian war.

== See also ==
- ARTHUR
- Penicillin (counter-artillery system)
- AN/TPQ-36 Firefinder radar
- AN/TPQ-37 Firefinder radar
- Swathi Weapon Locating Radar
- Red Color
