= List of equipment of the Royal Thai Army =

2 This is a list of equipment of the Royal Thai Army.

== Individual Equipment ==
Photo	Model	Type	Notes
	Thai Digital Camo	Camouflage/Combat uniform	Standard issued in 2009.
	ERDL pattern	Camouflage/Combat uniform	Former standard issue.
	Desert Battle Dress Uniform	Camouflage/Combat uniform	Used by Royal Thai Army during humanitarian mission at overseas, including Iraq.
	M1	Combat helmet	Limited use, Military police and training purpose.
	CVCH	Combat helmet	Standard issue Crewman Helmet for Main battle tank and Armored Fighting Vehicle Crewman.
	PASGT	Combat helmet	Standard issue combat helmet for Royal Thai Army.
	ACH	Combat helmet	Current standard issue combat helmet.
	MICH	Combat helmet	Used by Royal Thai Army Special Warfare Command.
	M1956 Load Bearing Equipment	Load-bearing Equipment	In use by Royal Thai Army.
	ALICE equipment	Load-bearing Equipment	In use by Royal Thai Army.
	Personnel Armor System for Ground Troops	Bulletproof vest	In use by Royal Thai Army.
	Scalable Plate Carrier	Plate carrier	Used by Royal Thai Army Special Warfare Command.

== Small arms and light weapons ==
Photo	Model	Type	Caliber	Origin	Notes
Pistols
	M1911	Semi-automatic pistol	.45 ACP	United States	Thai M1911A1 pistols produced under license; locally known as the Type 86 pistol (ปพ.86).
pistol.jpgcentre	SIG Sauer P320	Semi-automatic pistol	9×19mm Parabellum	United States	M17E/M18E versions seen procured and in use by Royal Thai Army.
	CZ 75	Semi-automatic pistol	9×19mm Parabellum	Czech Republic	Used by Royal Thai Army Special Forces.
	SIG Sauer P226	Semi-automatic pistol	9×19mm Parabellum	Germany; Switzerland	Used by Royal Thai Army Special Forces.
	Beretta 92FS	Semi-automatic pistol	9×19mm Parabellum	Italy	
	Glock 17/19	Semi-automatic pistol	9×19mm Parabellum	Austria	
	Daewoo K5	Semi-automatic pisto	9×19mm Parabellum	South Korea	200 K5s transferred according to a 2019 SIPRI small arms report.
	FN Five-seven	Semi-automatic pistol	FN 5.7×28mm	Belgium	Used by Royal Thai Army Special Forces.
Shotguns
	Remington Model 870	Pump-action shotgun	12 gauge	United States	
	Remington Model 1100	Semi-automatic shotgun	12 gauge	United States	
	Daewoo USAS-12	Automatic shotgun	12 gauge	South Korea	396 USAS-12 transferred according to a 2019 SIPRI small arms report.
Submachine guns
	Heckler & Koch MP5	Submachine gun	9×19mm Parabellum	Germany	Used by Royal Thai Army Special Forces.
	Uzi	Submachine gun	9×19mm Parabellum	Israel	Used by military police.
	FN P90	Submachine gun	FN 5.7x28mm	Belgium	FN P90 submachine guns used by Special Forces.
Assault rifles and carbines
	M16A1 M16A2 M16A4	Assault rifle	5.56×45mm NATO	United States	Standard issue rifle. 48,000+ M16A4
	Daewoo K2	Assault rifle	5.56×45mm NATO	South Korea	403 K2s transferred according to a 2019 SIPRI small arms report.
	Type 11 (HK33A2) Type 11 A1 (HK33A3) Type 11 K (HK33KA3) Type 11 ZF (HK33SG/1)	Assault rifle	5.56×45mm NATO	Thailand	The Type 11 (ปลย.11) is a Thai license produced version of the Heckler & Koch HK33. Used by rear line troops and Army Reserve Force Students.
	Colt M5	Assault rifle	5.56×45mm NATO	United States	10.3" and 14.5"-inch versions in use with Special Forces as its standard issue rifle.
	FN SCAR-L	Assault rifle	5.56×45mm NATO	Belgium	Scar-L CQC seen in use with 112th Mechanised Infantry Brigade (Stryker Regiment Combat Team).
	IWI Tavor TAR-21	Assault rifle	5.56×45mm NATO	Israel	Widely used by Cavalry units and First Army Area units. 73,000+ TAR-21
	Galil Ace N-23	Assault rifle	5.56×45mm NATO	Israel	Used by 9th Infantry Division. 3,000+ Galil
	IWI Tavor X95	Carbine	5.56×45mm NATO	Israel	
	M4	Carbine	5.56×45mm NATO	United States	M4 ACC-M and M4A1 versions in use. 30,000+ M4A1
	Norinco CQ-A	Carbine	5.56×45mm NATO	China	Used by Thahan Phran.
	AK-102	Carbine	5.56×45mm NATO	Russia	Used by Thahan Phran. Also seen in use with special forces.
	AK-104	Carbine	7.62×39mm	Russia	Used by Thahan Phran.
Sniper rifles and marksman rifles
	IMI Galatz	Sniper rifle	7.62×51mm NATO	Israel	Used in small numbers.
	SIG Sauer SSG 3000	Sniper rifle	7.62×51mm NATO	Germany	
	SR-25	Marksman rifle	7.62×51mm NATO	United States	
	Barrett M82/ Barrett M107	Anti-materiel rifle	.50 BMG	United States	Used by special forces.
Machine guns
	M249	Light machine gun	5.56×45mm NATO	United States	Used by Royal Thai Army Special Forces.
	Daewoo K3	Light machine gun	5.56×45mm NATO	South Korea	2 K3s transferred according to a 2019 SIPRI small arms report.
	Ultimax 100	Light machine gun	5.56×45mm NATO	Singapore	
	IWI Negev	Light machine gun	5.56×45mm NATO	Israel	1,550 NG-5s were delivered.
	FN Minimi	Light machine gun	5.56×45mm NATO	Belgium	
	FN MAG	General-purpose machine gun	7.62×51mm NATO	Belgium	
	M60	General-purpose machine gun	7.62×51mm NATO	United States	
	Heckler & Koch HK21	General-purpose machine gun	7.62×51mm NATO	Germany	
	M2 Browning	Heavy machine gun	.50 BMG	United States	Locally known as Type 93 machine gun (ปก.93). Use by infantry units and mobile vehicles and helicopters.
Grenade launchers
	M320	Grenade launcher	40×46mm	Germany; United States	
	M203	Grenade launcher	40×46mm	United States	
	M79	Grenade launcher	40×46mm	United States	
	STK 40 AGL	Automatic grenade launcher	40×53mm	Singapore	
	MK19	Automatic grenade launcher	40×53mm	United States	
Anti-tank systems
	FGM-148 Javelin	Anti-tank guided missile	127 mm	United States	50 systems 300 missiles
	Spike-MR	Anti-tank guided missile	152 mm	Israel	30 systems
	BGM-71 TOW	Anti-tank guided missile	152 mm	United States	
	M72 LAW	Rocket-propelled grenade	66 mm	United States	
	Type 69	Rocket-propelled grenade	85 mm	China	
	Carl Gustaf M3	Recoilless rifle	84 mm	Sweden	
	M40	Recoilless rifle	105 mm	United States	Mounted on M151 utility vehicles.

== Armoured fighting vehicles ==
=== Tanks ===
Model	Image	Origin	Quantity	Details
Main battle tanks
VT-4		China	62	The VT-4 shares many subsystems technology and features from other latest Chinese main battle tanks such as Type 96B and Type 99A.
T-84 Oplot		Ukraine	49	One visible feature is the new PNK-6 panoramic tank sight. "BM Oplot-T" is an export version of the OPLOT-M for Thailand.
M60A3 TTS		United States	125	38-48 M60A3 TTS was upgraded with Israeli TIFCS, HMA, index loader, electric gun and turret drive systems.
M60A1 RISE		United States	53	
M48A5		United States	105	Conversions of M48A1 hulls to the M48A5 standard. Retained the engine, transmission and track. All were further upgraded with components from the M60A1 RISE Hull PIP Update Kit.
Light tanks
Stingray		United States	106	
FV101 Scorpion		United Kingdom	154	Surveillance Target Acquisition and Weapon Sight from SELEX Galileo Ltd replacing its aging one. Replacing diesel-engine instead of gasoline-engine. (50 in store for a total of 154 tanks).
M41A3		United States	24	Spotted in use during the 2025 Cambodia–Thailand conflict as static firing positions.

=== Combat vehicles ===
Photo	Model	Type	Origin	Quantity	Notes
Combat vehicles
	M901 ITV	Tank destroyer	United States	18	
	BTR-3E1	Infantry fighting vehicle	Ukraine	238	Two variants were purchased, the BTR-3E1 Infantry Fighting Vehicle, and a specifically designed tank destroyer variant of the BTR-3, the BTR-3RK. The BTR-3RK is equipped with a special combat module that features 4 × RK-2S anti-tank guided missiles and a coaxial KT-7.62mm machine gun. A BTR-3E with a Cockerill CSE 90LP was also tested but not adopted.
	M1126 ICV	Infantry fighting vehicle	Canada; United States	147 (+200)	As of 2022, there were a total of 130 vehicles in service. 17 more Stryker ICV delivered to Thai Army in Hanuman Guardian 2026 after training is ended makes the total of 147 units in service. There are plans to procure an additional of 200 units by 2027. Recently upgraded with CROWS Remote Controlled Weapons System.
	VN-1	Infantry fighting vehicle	China	111	As of 2021, a total of 111 Type 08 IFV or VN-1 delivered. Thailand acquired 38 vehicles for first batch and another 34 for second batch and 39 for third batch in 2021.
	First Win	Infantry mobility vehicle	Thailand	71	Mine-protected vehicle. 21 ordered in 2012 and 50 ordered in 2013 for the total of 71. It is believed that more on order apart from 71 in service.
	REVA-3	Infantry mobility vehicle	South Africa	87	Mine-protected vehicle. Order in 3 Batch.
	V-100 V-150	Armoured personnel carrier	United States	19 113	
	M113A1/A2/A3	Armoured personnel carrier	United States	450	
	Type 85	Armoured personnel carrier	China	396	
Combat engineering vehicles
	M577	Armored command vehicle	United States	Unknown	
	FV105 Sultan	Armored command vehicle	United Kingdom	Unknown	
	Bronco ATTC	Amphibious armoured vehicle	Singapore	10	Troop carrier variant. Used by engineers.
	Bandvagn 206	Amphibious armoured vehicle	Sweden	Unknown	Used by engineers.
	BREM-84 Atlet	Armoured recovery vehicle	Ukraine	2	Based on the T-84 Oplot chassis.
	Type 84	Armoured recovery vehicle	China	5	
	FV106 Samson	Armoured recovery vehicle	United Kingdom	Unknown	
	M806	Armoured recovery vehicle	United States	Unknow	M113 Version Recover Vehicle.
	M88A1 Hercules M88A2 Hercules	Armoured recovery vehicle	United States	22 6	28 total in service.
	M578 LVR	Armoured recovery vehicle	United States	Unknown	
	M992A2	Resupply vehicle	United States	20	
	Type 84 AVLB	Armoured vehicle-launched bridge	China	4	Based on the Type 69 MBT. 18 m long mobile bridge.

== Utility and logistic vehicles ==
Photo	Model	Type	Origin	Notes
Utility vehicles
	Humvee	Military light utility vehicle	United States	
	M50 M51A M51B M51 Ambulance	Military light utility vehicle/Ambulance	Thailand	
	Land Rover Defender	Military light utility vehicle	United Kingdom	Militarised Land Rover Defender 4x4 towing vehicle, digital fire control systems, and associated accessories.
	Mercedes-Benz G-Class	Military light utility vehicle	Germany	
	Mitsubishi Type 73	Military light utility vehicle	Japan	Virtually replaced by the M50/M51 series of light utility vehicles.
	M151	Military light utility vehicle	United States	M151A2, M718A1, M825. Virtually replaced by the M50/M51 series of light utility vehicles.
	Chevrolet Colorado	Light utility vehicle	United States	
	Toyota Hilux Vigo	Light utility vehicle	Japan	
	Isuzu D-Max	Light utility vehicle	Japan	
	Toyota HiAce	Utility Vehicle/Ambulance	Japan	
	Polaris MRZR	All-terrain vehicle	United States	
Logistical vehicles
	M911	Tractor unit	United States	
	M1088	Tractor unit	United States	
	Sinotruk Howo	Tractor unit	China	
	Mercedes-Benz NG	Tractor unit	Germany	
	Mercedes-Benz Arocs	Tractor unit	Germany	
	Renault	Tractor unit	France	
	Scania R730	Tractor unit	Sweden	
	M35	Truck	United States	M35, M35A1, M35A2, M50A2, M50A3, M49A1, M49A2, M109A3, M185A1, M292A2, M275, M36A2.
	M54	Truck	United States	M54, M54A2, M51A1, M51A2, M52, M52A1, M52A2, M246, M543, M543A2, M813, M813A1, M820A2, M817, M818, M816.
	Bedford TM3250	Truck	United Kingdom	TM3250 is 5-ton 4x4 truck.
	UNIMOG	Truck	Germany	RTA use U1100/L 4x4, U1550 4x4, U2450/L 6x6, U2405 6x6.
	Kia KM450	Truck	South Korea	
	Kia KM250	Truck	South Korea	
	KrAZ-6322	Truck	Ukraine	KrAZ-6322 were ordered for Royal Thai Army in April 2013. In October 2013 first KrAZ-6322 trucks were delivered to RTA.
	TATA 715	Truck	India	Chaiseri truck 1 1/4 ton built based on TATA LPTA 715 4x4.
	Hino 500	Truck	Japan	Hino 500 has been locally produced by Hino Motors Manufacturing (Thailand) Ltd.
	Isuzu F-Series	Truck	Japan	RTA use Isuzu FTS 800 4x4, FTS 33 H2E 4x4.
	Mitsubishi Fuso	Truck	Japan	
	Nissan Diesel UD	Dump truck	Japan	
	M945	Bridge Transporter	United States	
	Norinco MFB	Modular fast bridge	China	Chinese modular fast bridge is a modular fast bridge launcher truck 10x10.
Unmanned ground vehicles
	D-Iron	Unmanned ground vehicle	Estonia	DTI integrated with Australian manufacturer EOS's R400S-Mk2 Direct Drive-Heavy Duty (D-HD) RWS, with the complete system.

== Artillery ==
Photo	Model	Type	Origin	Quantity	Notes
Multiple rocket launcher
	D11A	Multi-purpose self-propelled multiple rocket launcher	Israel; Thailand	1(+1)	DTI is partnering with Elbit Systems to develop a Thai version of the PULS.
	DTI-1G	302 mm self-propelled multiple rocket launcher	China; Thailand	3	The multiple guided rocket launcher is based on WS-32 The GTI-1G has been used in combat in the Thai-Cambodian conflict, and there is a plan to purchase it for import to the national defense plan in 2026.
	DTI-1	302 mm self-propelled multiple rocket launcher	China; Thailand	2	The weapon is a derivative of the WS-1B.
	DTI-2	122 mm self-propelled multiple rocket launcher	Thailand	1	The second generation of 122 mm rocket developed by the Thai Defense Industry and DTI. Mounted on Type 85 AFV.
	SR-4	122 mm self-propelled multiple rocket launcher	China	6	Export version of PHL-11 using 6x6 Shaanxi SX2190KA truck chassis.
	Type 85	130 mm self-propelled multiple rocket launcher	China	6	Type 85 Self-Propelled Artillery Rocket Launcher or Type YW306 - Variant with a 30-round 130 mm rocket launcher mounted on top of the hull. A total of 60 rockets is carried on board. Crew: 6.
Howitzer
	M109	155 mm self-propelled howitzer	United States	20	
	ATMOS 2000	155 mm self-propelled howitzer	Israel; Thailand	30	As 2025, 30 in service. Locally produced and designated as M758 ATMG. Mounted on 6×6 10 tonne Tatra truck.
	CAESAR	155 mm self-propelled howitzer	France	6	
	M425	105 mm self-propelled howitzer	Thailand	3	M35 truck with a mounted M101A1 (Improved) gun at the back.
	Soltam M-71	155 mm towed howitzer	Israel	32	Some units modified to be self-propelled howitzer mounted on 6×6 truck.
	M198	155 mm towed howitzer	United States	116	
	M777	155 mm towed howitzer	United States	0(+6)	1 Battalion plan
	GHN-45	155 mm towed howitzer	Canada	92	
	M101A1	105 mm towed howitzer	France	285	Thai M101 rebuilt to M101/30; Thai designation M101A1 (Improved).
	L119	105 mm towed howitzer	United Kingdom	22	
	GIAT LG1	105 mm towed howitzer	France	36	
	OTO Melara Mod 56	105 mm towed howitzer	Italy	12	
Mortar
	M1064A3	120 mm self-propelled mortar	United States	12	12 M1064A3 ordered in 1995 and delivered in 1997.
	Type85	81/120 mm mortar self-propelled mortar	China	Unknown	
	Cardom	120 mm self-propelled mortar	Israel	24	SPEAR version for the locally produced and designated as ATMM. Mounted on a 4×4 truck supplied by Tata truck.
	BTR-3	81/120 mm self-propelled mortar	Ukraine	~33	~12 BTR-3M1,~11 BTR-3M2
	VN1	120 mm self-propelled mortar	China	~12	
	M132A1	120 mm mortar	Thailand	Unknown	
	M29	81 mm mortar	United States	Unknown	
	M121	60 mm mortar	Thailand	Unknown	M121A1 mortar, M121A2 mortar and M121A3 commando mortar.

== Air defence ==
Photo	Model	Type	Origin	Notes
Surface-to-air missiles
	VL MICA	Surface-to-air missile	France	1 entered service in 2019, receive two launchers and one command truck.
	Starstreak	Man-portable air-defense system	United Kingdom	24 launchers with 240 missiles.
	9K38 Igla-S	Man-portable air-defense system	Russia	60 part of order placed in 2010.
Anti-aircraft gun
	M163 VADS	20 mm self-propelled anti-aircraft gun	United States	24 in service. Currently undergoing upgrade by IMI.
	M42 Duster	40 mm self-propelled anti-aircraft gun	United States	18 units in service with the 4th Anti-Aircraft Battalion.
	M167 VADS	20 mm towed anti-aircraft gun	United States	24 M167 Vulcan Air Defense System (VADS) in service.
	Oerlikon GDF	35 mm twin cannon towed anti-aircraft gun	Switzerland	8 GDF-007 in service.
	Bofors L60	40 mm towed anti-aircraft gun	Sweden	30 L/60 (M1) in service. 16 EL/70 LVS in service.
	BAE Systems EL/70 LVS	40 mm towed anti-aircraft gun	United Kingdom	70 EL/70 LVS in service.
	Type 59	57 mm towed anti-aircraft gun	China	24 Type 59 in service.

== Radar system ==
Photo	Model	Type	Origin	Notes
Air search radar
	Flycatcher	Mobile short range air search radar	Netherlands	Use supports Bofors L60.
	Skyguard 3 FC	Mobile short range air search radar	Switzerland	Use supports Oerlikon GDF.
	TRML-3D/32	Mobile medium range air search radar	Germany	Use supports VL Mica.
	ATAR	Medium range air search radar	Israel	
Artillery-locating radar
	AN/TPQ-36(V)11	Counter-battery radar	United States	
	BL-904A	Counter-battery radar	China	

== Aircraft ==
Photo	Model	Type	Origin	Quantity	Notes
Fixed-wing aircraft
	Embraer ERJ-135LR	VIP transport aircraft	Brazil	2	Both aircraft delivered (serial numbers 1084/HS-AMP and 1124).
	British Aerospace Jetstream 41	VIP transport aircraft	United Kingdom	2	Serial numbers 41060 and 41094. Based with the VIP unit at Don Mueang Airport.
	Gulfstream G500	VIP transport aircraft	United States	1	
	Beechcraft Super King Air 200	VIP transport aircraft	United States	2	Serial numbers 0342 and 1165. Based at the Lopburi army complex.
	Pilatus PC-12	VIP transport aircraft	Switzerland	1	
	CASA C-295W	Military transport aircraft	Spain	3	The RTA ordered one C-295W.
	CASA C-212-300 Aviocar	Military transport aircraft	Spain	2	Serial numbers 446 and 447 based with the VIP squadron at Don Mueang International Airport.
	C-208 Grand Caravan Ex	Utility aircraft	United States	2	
	Cessna 182T	Utility aircraft	United States	3	
	Kodiak 100	Utility aircraft	United States	3	
	Maule MX-7-235	Utility aircraft	United States	12	
Helicopter
	Bell AH-1F Huey Cobra	Attack helicopter	United States	7	Four were ordered in 1988 and another four were ordered in 2005. One was lost in 2001 crash. Three in storage for spare parts. Will be replaced by the Boeing AH-6.
	Boeing AH-6	Light attack helicopter	United States	8	
	Airbus Helicopters H125M	Light attack helicopter	France	8	
	Sikorsky UH-60L/M/A Blackhawk	Utility helicopter	United States	22(+6)	Two UH-60Ls were lost in 2011 and 2022 crashes. Current fleet now up to 22 helicopters. 8 UH-60L,3 UH-60A,11 UH-60M. 6 UH-60A/M on order.
	UH-1N Twin Huey	Utility helicopter	United States	48	
	Bell 206 Jet Ranger	Utility helicopter	United States	20	Both the Bell 206A and Bell 206B are in use.
	Airbus Helicopters UH-72A Lakota	Utility helicopter	United States	5	One lost in 2016 crash.
	AgustaWestland AW139	Utility helicopter	Italy	10	
	AgustaWestland AW149	Utility helicopter	Italy	5	
	Airbus Helicopters H145	Utility helicopter	Germany	6	
	Mi-17V-5	Utility/Transport helicopter	Russia	10	
	Schweizer 300C	Observation/Trainer helicopter	United States	45	For observation and training.
	Enstrom 480B	Trainer helicopter	United States	21	For training. One lost in crash.
	Robinson R44	Trainer helicopter	United States	1	For training.
Surveillance Unmanned Aerial Vehicles
	Elbit Hermes 450	Unmanned aerial vehicle	Israel	4	The unmanned aerial vehicles are operated by the 21st Aviation Battalion at the Army Aviation Centre at Lopburi. In use since 2018.
	IAI Searcher Mk.II	Unmanned aerial vehicle	Israel	4	In use since 2001.
	AeroVironment RQ-11 Raven	Unmanned aerial vehicle	United States	Unknown	In use since 2010.
	Sky Saker FX80	Unmanned aerial vehicle	China	4	VTOL UAV.
	ATIL DP-20	Unmanned aerial vehicle	Thailand	2	It is unknown whether they are in army service (in use since 2023).
	ATIL DP-20A	Unmanned Combat Aerial Vehicle	Thailand	0(+1)	It is unknown whether they are in army service (in use since 2026).
	DTI D-Eyes 02	Unmanned aerial vehicle	Thailand	Unknown	It is unknown whether they are in army service (in use since 2017).
	MOAI	Target drone	Spain	Unknown	In use since 2019.
