= SLC-2 =

SLC-2 may refer to:

- SLC-2 Radar - a military defence radar system.
- Vandenberg AFB Space Launch Complex 2 - a rocket launch pad at Vandenberg Air Force Base
