= Counter-battery radar =

Radar that locates artillery pieces by tracking their projectiles

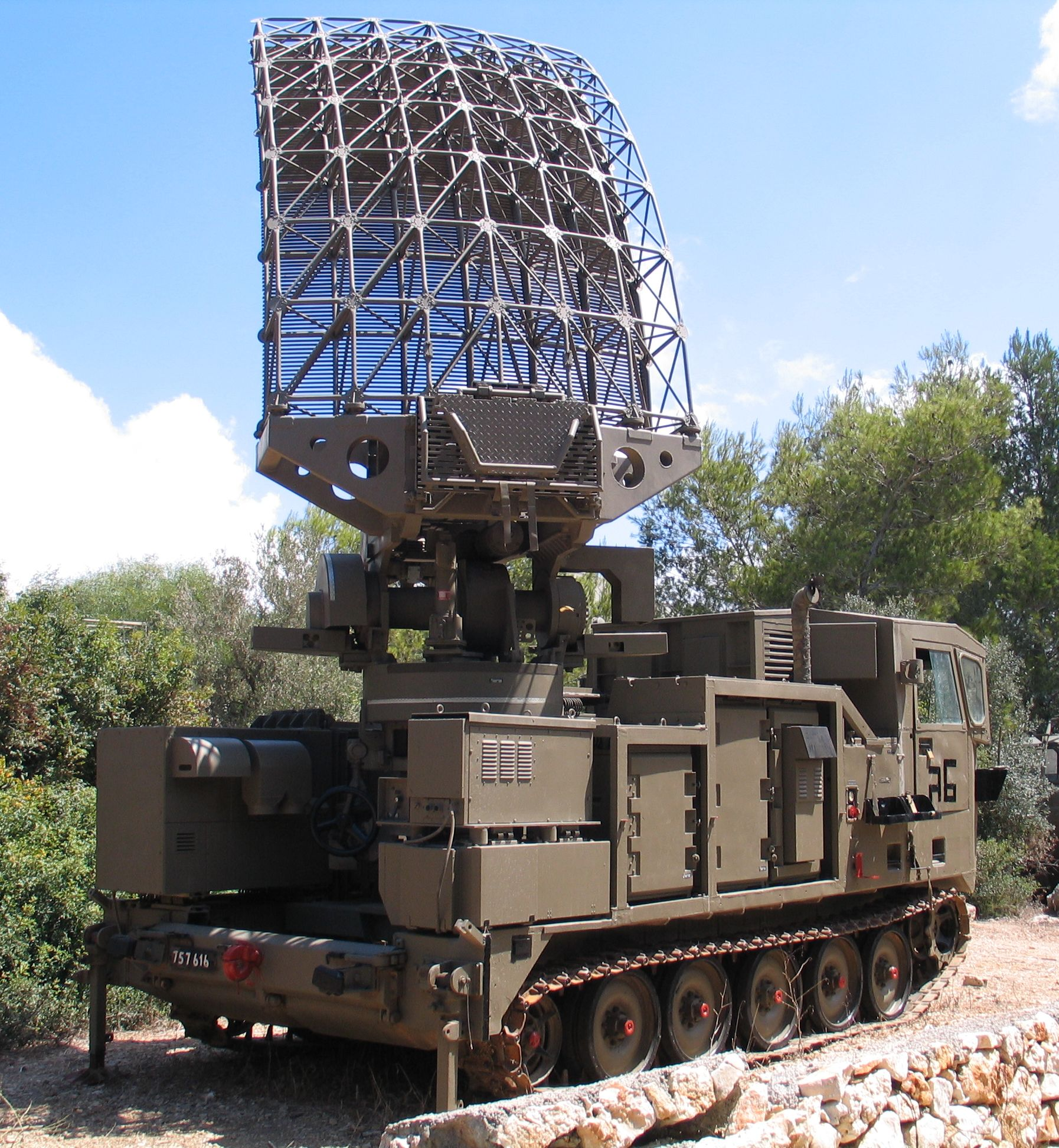
An Israeli Shilem counter-battery radar

Functional principle of counter-battery radar

A counter-battery radar, weapon locating radar or weapon tracking radar is a radar system that detects artillery projectiles fired by one or more guns, howitzers, mortars or rocket launchers and, from their trajectories, locates the position on the ground of the weapon that fired it. Such radars are a subclass of the wider class of target acquisition radars.

Early counter-battery radars were generally used against mortars, whose lofted trajectories were highly symmetrical and allowed easy calculation of the launcher's location. Starting in the 1970s, digital computers with improved calculation capabilities allowed more complex trajectories of long-range artillery to also be determined. Normally, these radars would be attached to friendly artillery units or their support units, allowing them to quickly arrange counter-battery fire.

With the aid of modern communications systems, the information from a single radar can be rapidly disseminated over long distances. This allows the radar to notify multiple batteries as well as provide early warning to the friendly targets. Modern counter-battery radar can locate hostile batteries up to about 50 kilometres (31 mi; 27 nmi) away depending on the radar's capabilities and the terrain and weather. Some counter-battery radars can also be used to track the fire of friendly artillery and calculate corrections to adjust its fire onto a particular place, but this is usually a secondary mission objective.

Radar is the most recently developed means of locating hostile artillery. The emergence of indirect fire in World War I saw the development of sound ranging, flash spotting and aerial reconnaissance, both visual and photographic. Radars, like sound ranging and flash spotting, require hostile guns, etc., to fire before they can be located.

== History ==
The first radars were developed for anti-aircraft purposes just before World War II. These were soon followed by fire control radars for ships and coastal artillery batteries. The latter could observe the splashes of water from missing shots, enabling corrections to be plotted. Generally, the shells could not be seen directly by the radar, as they were too small and rounded to make a strong return, and travelled too quickly for the mechanical antennas of the era to follow.

Radar operators in light anti-aircraft batteries close to the front line found they were able to track mortar bombs. This was likely helped by the fins of the bomb producing a partial corner cube that strongly reflected the signal. These accidental intercepts led to their dedicated use in this role, with special secondary instruments if necessary, and development of radars designed for mortar locating. Dedicated mortar-locating radars were common starting in the 1960s and were used until around 2000.

Locating mortars was relatively easy because of their high, arcing, trajectory. At times, just after firing and just before impact, the trajectory is almost linear. If a radar observes the shell at two points in time just after launch, the line between those points can be extended to the ground and provides a highly accurate position of the mortar, more than enough for counter-battery artillery to hit it with ease. Better radars were also able to detect howitzers when firing at high angles, elevations greater than 45°, although such use was quite rare.

Low angle trajectories normally used by guns, howitzers and rockets were more difficult. Purely ballistic low-angle trajectories are lopsided, being relatively parabolic for the start of the flight but becoming much more curved near the end. This is further modified by otherwise minor effects like wind, air pressure differences and aerodynamic effects, which have time to add up to a noticeable effect on long-range fire but can be ignored for short-range systems like mortars. These effects are minimized immediately after launch, but the low angle makes it difficult to see the rounds during this time, in contrast to a mortar which climbs above the horizon almost immediately. Adding to the problem is the fact that traditional artillery shells make for difficult radar targets.

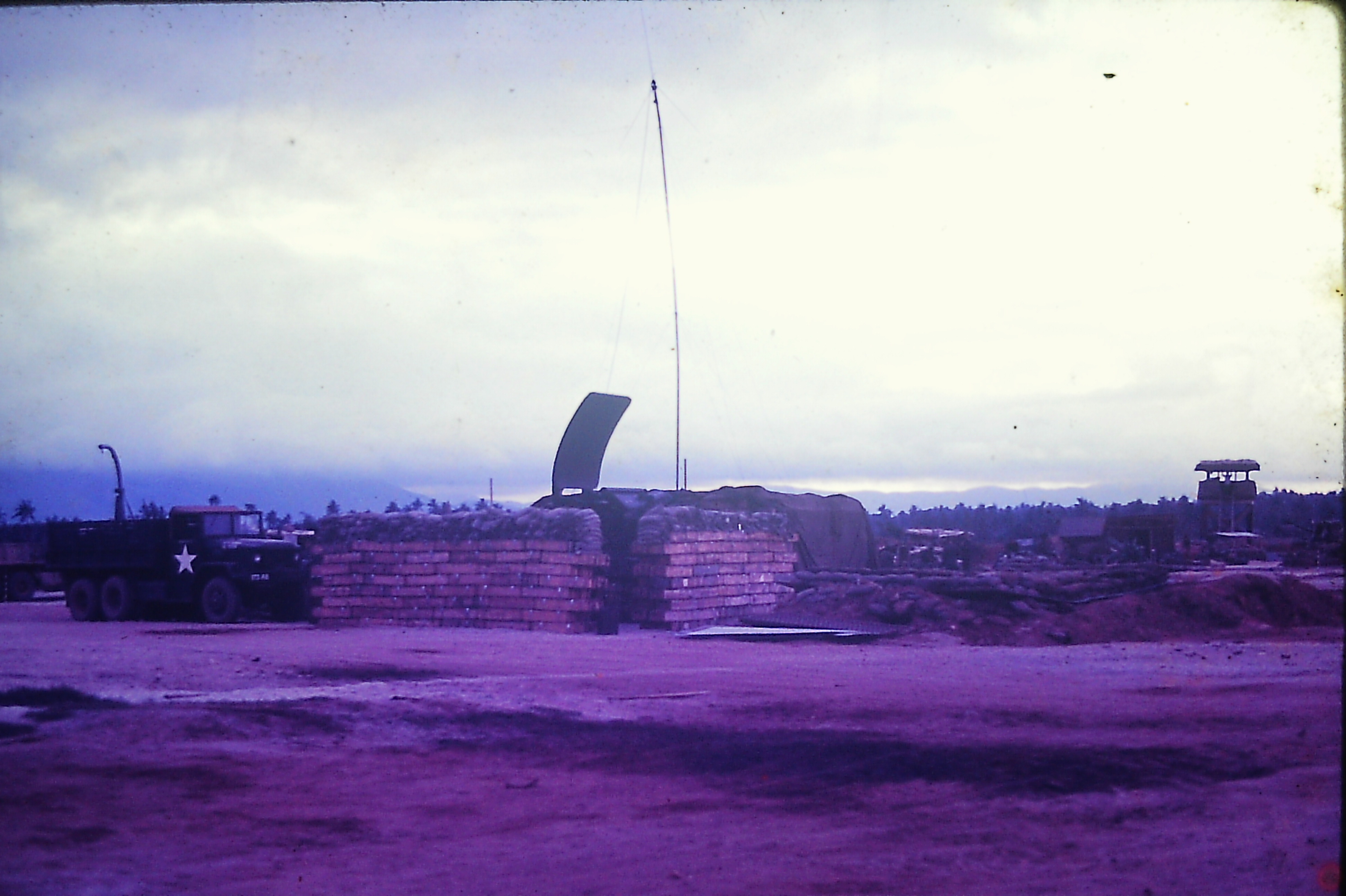
Counter battery radar of the 19th Engineer Battalion in Vietnam, 1968.

By the early 1970s, radar systems capable of locating guns appeared possible, and many European members of NATO embarked on the joint Project Zenda. This was short-lived for unclear reasons, but the US embarked on its Firefinder program and Hughes Aircraft Company developed the necessary algorithms, although it took two or three years of difficult work.

The next step forward was European when in 1986 France, West Germany and UK agreed the 'List of Military Requirements' for a new counter-battery radar. The distinguishing feature was that instead of just locating individual guns, etc., the radar would be able to locate many simultaneously and group them into batteries with a centre point, dimensions and attitude of the long axis of the battery. This radar eventually reached service as Euro-ART's COBRA (COunter Battery RAdar) AESA system. 29 COBRA systems were produced and delivered in a roll-out which was completed in Aug. 2007 (12 to Germany – out of which two were re-sold to Turkey, 10 to France and 7 to the UK).

Three additional systems were ordered in Feb. 2009 by the United Arab Emirates Armed Forces. Simultaneous with the development of COBRA, Norway and Sweden developed a smaller, more mobile counter-battery radar known as ARTHUR. It was taken into service in 1999 and is today used by 7 NATO countries and The Republic Of South Korea. New versions of ARTHUR have twice the accuracy of the original.

Operations in Iraq and Afghanistan led to a new need for a small counter-mortar radar for use in forward operating bases, providing 360° coverage and requiring a minimal crew. In another back to the future step it has also proved possible to add counter-battery software to battlefield airspace surveillance radars.

== Description ==
The basic technique is to track a projectile for sufficient time to record a segment of the trajectory. This is usually done automatically, but some early and not so early radars required the operator to manually track the projectile. Once a trajectory segment is captured it can then be processed to determine its point of origin on the ground. Before digital terrain databases this involved manual iteration with a paper map to check the altitude at the coordinates, change the location altitude and recompute the coordinates until a satisfactory location was found.

An additional problem was detecting the projectile in flight in the first place. The conical shaped beam of a traditional radar had to be pointing in the right direction, but in order to have sufficient power and accuracy for this the beam's angle was limited, typically to about 25°, which made finding a projectile quite difficult. One technique was to deploy listening posts that told the radar operator roughly where to point the beam; in some cases the radar was not switched on until this point to make it less vulnerable to electronic counter-measures (ECM). However, conventional radar beams were not notably effective.

Since a parabola is defined by just three points, tracking a long segment of the trajectory was not notably efficient. The Royal Radar Establishment in the UK developed a different approach for their Green Archer system. Instead of a conical beam, the radar signal was produced in the form of a fan, about 40° wide and 1° high. A Foster scanner modified the signal to cause it to focus on a horizontal location that rapidly scanned back and forth. This allowed it to comprehensively scan a small slice of the sky.

The operator would watch for mortar bombs to pass through the slice, locating its range with pulse timing, its horizontal location by the location of the Foster scanner at that instant, and its vertical location from the known angle of the thin beam. The operator would then flick the antenna to a second angle facing higher into the air, and wait for the signal to appear there. This produced the necessary two points that could be processed by an analogue computer. A similar system was the US AN/MPQ-4, although this was a somewhat later design and somewhat more automated as a result.

Once phased array radars compact enough for field use and with reasonable digital computing power appeared, they offered a better solution. A phased array radar has many transmitter/receiver modules which use differential tuning to rapidly scan up to a 90° arc without moving the antenna. They can detect and track anything in their field of view, providing they have sufficient computing power. They can filter out the targets of no interest (e.g., aircraft) and depending on their capability track a useful proportion of the rest.

Counter-battery radars used to be mostly X band because this offers the greatest accuracy for the small radar targets. However, in the radars produced today, C band and S band are common. The Ku band has also been used. Projectile detection ranges are governed by the radar cross section (RCS) of the projectiles. Typical RCS are:

Type	Radar cross-section	
Mortar bomb	0.01 m^{2}	16 sq in
Artillery shell	0.001 m^{2}	1.6 sq in
Light rocket e.g., 122 mm (4.8 in)	0.009 m^{2}	14 sq in
Heavy rocket e.g., 227 mm (8.9 in)	0.018 m^{2}	28 sq in

The best modern radars can detect howitzer shells at around 30 km (19 mi; 16 nmi), and rockets/mortars at 50 km (31 mi; 27 nmi). The trajectory has to be high enough to be seen by the radar at these ranges, and since the best locating results for guns and rockets are achieved with a reasonable length of trajectory segment close to the gun, long range detection does not guarantee good locating results. The accuracy of location is typically given by a circular error probable (CEP), the circle around the target in which 50% of locations will fall, expressed as a percentage of range. Modern radars typically give CEPs around 0.3–0.4% of range. However, with these figures, long range accuracy may be insufficient to satisfy the rules of engagement for counter-battery fire in counter insurgency operations.

Radars typically have a crew of 4–8 soldiers. Only one is needed to actually operate the radar. Older types were mostly trailer-mounted with a separate generator, so it took 15–30 minutes to bring into action and needed a larger crew. Self-propelled ones have been used since the 1960s. To produce accurate locations, radars have to know their own precise coordinates and be precisely oriented. Until about 1980 this relied upon conventional artillery survey, although gyroscopic orientation from the mid-1960s helped. Modern radars have an integral inertial navigation system, often aided by GPS.

Radars can detect projectiles at considerable distances. Larger projectiles give stronger reflected signals (RCS). Detection ranges depend upon capturing at least several seconds of a trajectory and can be limited by the radar horizon and the height of the trajectory. For non-parabolic trajectories, it is important to capture a trajectory as close as possible to its source in order to obtain the necessary accuracy.

Action on locating hostile artillery depends on policy and circumstances. In some armies, radars may have the authority to send target details to counter-battery fire units and order them to fire. In others they may merely report data to an HQ that then takes action. Modern radars usually record the target as well as the firing position of hostile artillery. This is usually for intelligence purposes because it is seldom possible to give the target sufficient warning time in a battlefield environment, even with data communications.

There are exceptions. The new lightweight counter-mortar radar (LCMR – AN/TPQ 48) is crewed by two soldiers and designed to be deployed inside forward positions. In these circumstances it can immediately alert adjacent troops as well as pass target data to mortars close by for counter-fire. Similarly the new GA10 (Ground Alerter 10) radar was qualified and successfully deployed by the French land forces in 2020 in several different FOBs worldwide.

== Threats ==
Radars are vulnerable and high-value targets. They are easy to detect and locate if the enemy has the necessary ELINT/ESM capability. The consequences of this detection are likely to be attack by artillery fire or aircraft, including anti-radiation missiles, or electronic countermeasures. The usual measures against detection are using a radar horizon to screen from ground-based detection, minimising transmission time and using alerting arrangements to tell the radar when hostile artillery is active. Deploying radars singly and moving frequently reduces exposure to attack.

In low-threat environments, such as the Balkans in the 1990s, they may transmit continuously and deploy in clusters to provide all-around surveillance.

In other circumstances, particularly counter-insurgency, where ground attack with direct fire or short range indirect fire is the main threat, radars deploy in defended localities but do not need to move, unless they need to cover a different area.

== Safety ==
Counter-battery radars operate at microwave frequencies with relatively high average energy consumption, up to the tens of kilowatts. The area immediately forward of the radar array for high energy radars is dangerous to human health. The intense radar waves of systems like the AN/TPQ-36 can detonate electrically fused ammunition at short ranges.

== Counter-battery radar systems ==
- (Soviet Union) (Russia) 1RL126 (NATO reporting name: Small Fred) counter-battery/surveillance radar, mounted onto a PRP-3 Val
- (Russia) 1B75 Penicillin acoustic-thermal artillery-reconnaissance system
- (United States) AN/MPQ-10 (mortar locating), Echo Band, before 1945. Modified in 1980's to AN/MPQ-10S (Saunders Modification) provided Echo Band tracking and C-Band surface-to-air missile guidance simulations for ECM training.
- (United States) AN/KPQ-1 (mortar locating), before 1954
- (United States) AN/MPQ-4 (mortar locating), 1958
- (United States) AN/TPQ-36 Firefinder radar, 1982
- (United States) AN/TPQ-37 Firefinder radar, 1980
- (United States) AN/MPQ-64F1 Improved Sentinel (in Multi Mode Sentinel), 1997 initial Sentinel, ~2020 improved
- (United States) AN/TPQ-48 Lightweight Counter Mortar Radar (LCMR)
- (United States) AN/TPQ-49 LCMR Counterfire Radar
- (United States) AN/TPQ-50 LCMR Counterfire Radar, 2011
- (United States) AN/TPQ-53 Quick Reaction Capability Radar, 2009
- (United States) AN/TPS-80 combined air surveillance and counter-battery radar, 2016
- (Soviet Union) ARSOM 2P (NATO reporting name: Small Yawn)
- (Russia) Aistyonok, 2008
- (Turkey) ASELSAN STR
- (Norway) (Sweden) ARTHUR counter-battery radar
  - Mod D variant is used by the British Army under the designation TAIPAN.
- (Brazil) DTCBia combined air surveillance and counter-battery radar, 2024
- (European Union) Euro-Art COBRA (radar) Active electronically scanned array
- (Israel) EL/M-2084 combined air surveillance and counter-battery radar
- (Sweden) Giraffe AMB combined air surveillance and counter-battery radar

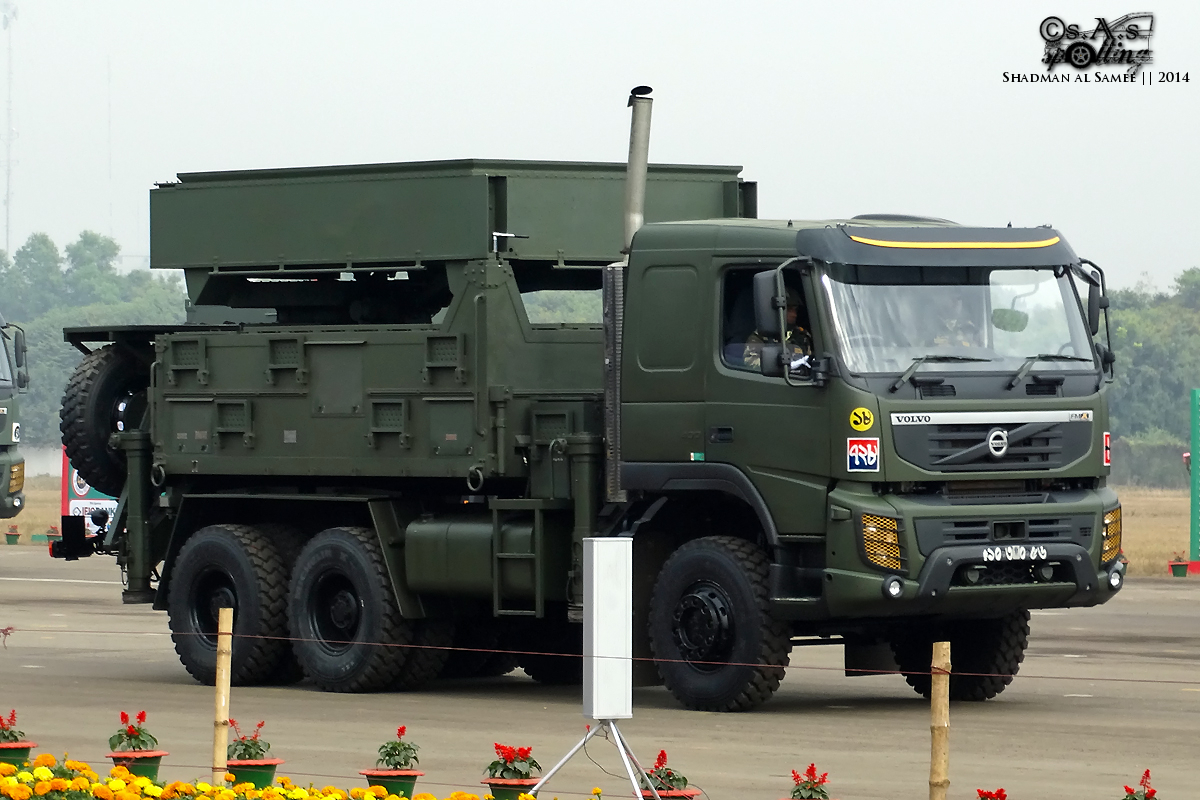
SLC-2 Counter-battery radar

- (Soviet Union) (Russia) SNAR 1, SNAR 2 (NATO reporting name: Pork Trough) mortar-projectile tracking radar
- (India) Swathi Weapon Locating Radar
- (China) SLC-2 Radar
  - (China) Type 373 Radar
- (United Kingdom) Radar FA No 15 (Cymbeline) (mortar locating)
- (United Kingdom) Radar FA No 8 (Green Archer) (mortar locating)
- (Poland) RZRA Liwiec Artillery Reconnaissance Radar System
- (Israel) Red Color
- (China) Type 704 Radar
  - (China) BL904 radar
- (Soviet Union) (Russia) 1L219 Zoopark-1, 1989
  - (Ukraine) 1L220 Zoopark-2

== See also ==
- Counter-battery fire
- Counter rocket, artillery and mortar (C-RAM)
- Short range air defense (SHORAD)
- Shoot-and-scoot
