= Swathi Weapon Locating Radar =

Counter-battery radar

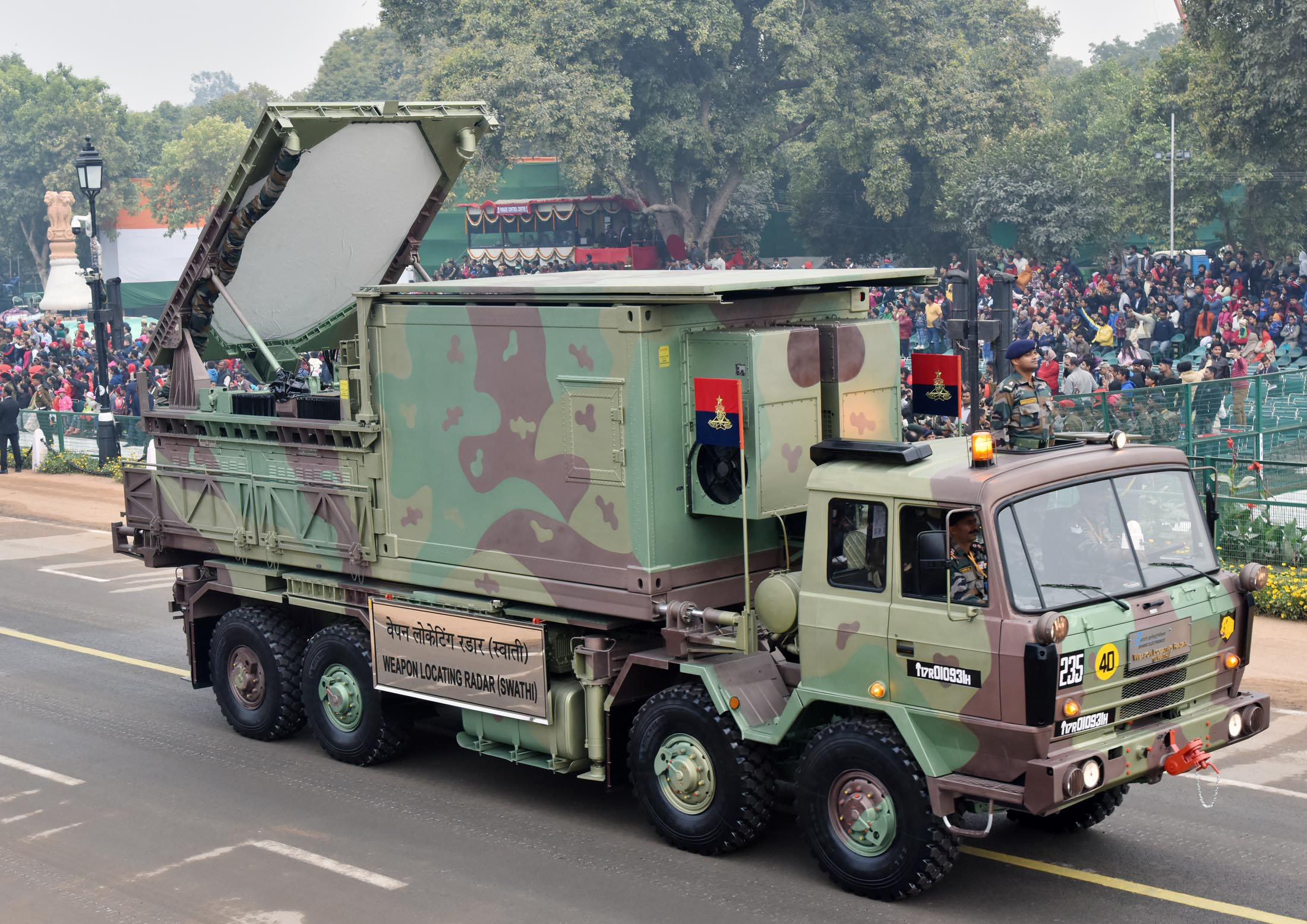
- Swathi Weapon Locating Radar (Plains) at Republic Day 2018
- Country of origin: India
- Manufacturer: Bharat Electronics
- Designer: Electronics and Radar Development Establishment
- No. built: 53+
- Type: Artillery Locating Radar
- Frequency: C band
- Range: Artillery → 2-30 km Rockets → 4-80 km Mortars → 2-20 km
- Azimuth: +/-45° Electronic scan (Slewable Array)
- Elevation: -5 to 75°
- Power: 40 kW
- Other names: Swathi

The Swathi (lit.Very Beneficent) weapon locating radar is a mobile counter-battery, phased array radar jointly developed by the Electronics and Radar Development Establishment, and Bharat Electronics. This is designed to detect and track incoming artillery and rocket fire, to determine the point of origin for counter-battery fire.

The sub-systems have been fabricated by BEL based on the designs from Defence Research and Development Organisation, and delivered to LRDE for integration. It is networked with the Artillery Combat Command and Control System.

== Development ==
=== Background ===
The Indian army projected a requirement for fire-finding radars in the 1980s. As early as 1989, the Indian Army evaluated the American AN/TPQ-36 and AN/TPQ-37 Firefinder radars. However, these radars were not allowed to be sold, and the procurement process was stopped by the Indian Government. In February 1995, a Request for Proposal (RFP) was issued to five companies for procurement of 4 WLRs. Only Hughes (now Raytheon) responded to the RFP. After trials, the radar was found to not meet the General Staff Quality Requirements (GSQRs) of the Indian Army, which were found to be too stringent, and the GSQRs were then relaxed. At the same time, it was decided to consider development of an indigenous WLR by India's primary defence contractor, DRDO.

In September 1998, an RFP was issued for the urgent purchase of WLRs - AN/TPQ-36/37 from Hughes (USA), Thomson-CSF (France) and ISKARA of (Ukraine). However, the American and French radars were withheld when sanctions were imposed after India's Pokhran-II nuclear weapon tests, and negotiations with the Ukrainian manufacturers came to no conclusion. Additionally, DRDO was not authorised to begin development of a WLR. These lacklustre efforts to obtain a WLR system were severely criticised by the Parliamentary Standing Committee on Defence.

Efforts to acquire such a system intensified after the Kargil War in 1999 where the Indian Army was severely disadvantaged by its lack of radar that could detect artillery fire. While the Pakistani forces were equipped with American AN/TPQ-36 Firefinder radars, India only had British Cymbeline mortar detecting radars, which were not suitable. Almost 80% of Indian casualties during the war resulted from enemy artillery fire, making such a radar critical.

=== Development ===
In 2002, the Ministry of Defence issued an RFP to five manufacturers. With the lifting of sanctions in late 2001, the US Government offered to sell the AN/TPQ-37 radar to India under their Foreign Military Sales (FMS) programme for ₹. 680 million each. In July 2002, India placed a US$ 200 million order for 12 AN/TPQ-37 Firefinder radars. Initially, only 8 were ordered for US$140 million, but the order was later increased to 12. The radars were integrated on BEML Limited manufactured Tatra truck platforms. Delivery of all 12 radars was completed in May 2007. Concept design work on the WLR also accelerated in the aftermath of the Kargil War.

The WLR project was officially sanctioned in April 2002, with a sanctioned amount of ₹ 200 million and an estimated completion time of 40 months. The first working prototype was to be ready by April 2004. The final project cost was US$ 49 million. In January 2003, an intent for procurement of 28 WLRs was placed with BEL.

A basic prototype of the WLR was first unveiled at Aero India-2003. The WLR was showcased at the Republic Day Parade in 2007. User trials of the WLR began in 2005. The Army also used WLRs to further their "shoot-and-scoot" doctrine using self-propelled guns and artillery to loosen up defence before an offensive onslaught into hostile territory. By mid-2006, the WLR was in advanced user acceptance trials and the radar was stated to be ready for production.

After user trials by the Indian Army in severe electronic clutter and "high density fire environment", in June 2008, the WLR was accepted by the Indian Army. 28 units are on order, and are being manufactured by BEL. A large number of components will be sourced from the private sector, including some commercial off-the-shelf (COTS) components from the international market. The WLR will eventually service the Army's requirement for 40-50 systems. Further improved versions of the WLR are being planned and designed, including longer range versions, as well as more compact variants for better operation and navigation over mountainous terrains.

== Design ==
The WLR is similar to the AN/TPQ-37 radar in design and performance but is reportedly more user friendly. It is a passive electronically scanned array radar, derived from the Rajendra Radar (which is the fire control radar for the Akash missile system). During tests of the Akash missile at Chandipur, engineers noticed the Rajendra radar was able to detect and track artillery shells being test fired at a nearby range. Based on this observation, LRDE scientists were able to adapt the Rajendra Array into the WLR.

The WLR Array is an electronically steered radar, meaning the radar antenna does not move while in operation. The radar can electronically scan a +/-45° range of azimuths for incoming rocket, artillery and mortar fire. The radar antenna is slewable up to +/-135° within 30 seconds, which gives the WLR the ability to quickly change its scanning sector, and provides it 360° scan capability. The coherent travelling-wave tube (TWT) based transmitter of the WLR emits 40 kilowatts of power.

Tracking of the target is done with monopulse signals with pulse compression, which improves the radar's range accuracy. The radar processors conduct real-time signal processing of the received signals. The weapon locating algorithm is an adaptive algorithm based on a modified version of the Runge-Kutta method, and uses constant false alarm rate (CFAR) techniques to detect the target accurately. The operator can choose the CFAR technique to be used to maximise the accuracy of information. The data is processed on a programmable digital signal processor using a modified extended Kalman filter, with two filters - one with 6 states, and another with 7 states. Clutter rejection is achieved through a moving target indicator (MTI), Airborne MTI (AMTI) and Fast Fourier Transform (FFT).

Information is displayed on ruggedised power PCs on a high resolution multi-mode colour display. The data is displayed in real-time and can be overlaid on a 3D digital map. The WLR can store a 100 km x 100 km size digital map for display at any time. Other modes include plan position indicator (PPI) display, RHI displays, etc. Up to 99 weapon locations can be stored and tracked at any time and can be transmitted to the command centre.

== Operation ==
The WLR is designed to detect and track incoming artillery rounds, mortar and rockets and locate their launchers. In its secondary role, it can also track and observe the fall of shot from friendly guns and provide fire corrections to counter-battery fire.

The detection range for large caliber artillery rounds is up to 30 km, and increases to 40 km for unguided rockets. The robust design of the radar array and algorithms allows the WLR to effectively operate even in a high density fire environment, in severe radar clutter and interference (jamming) conditions. Up to 7 targets can be tracked simultaneously. The radar can track rounds fired at both low and high angles, and at all aspect angles - from behind or towards the radar, or at an oblique angle to the array. The WLR features adaptive radar resource scheduling to increase efficiency and reliability.

At a given position, the radar can scan for targets in one quadrant, encompassing a 90° sector. The array can electronically scan up to +/-45° from its mean bearing. Additionally, for 360° coverage from a given position, the whole array can be rotated by 135° on either side within 30 seconds to quickly change the scanning sector in response to threats.

Upon detecting an incoming round, the automatically acquires and classifies the threat and initiates a track sequence, while continuing to search for new targets. The incoming round's trajectory is tracked, and a computer program analyses the track data and then extrapolates the round's point of origin. This calculated point of origin is then reported to the radar operator and can be stored up to 99 target locations with broad digital map displays thus allowing friendly artillery to direct counter-battery fire towards the enemy artillery.

The WLR also allows for remote operation, and data-linking for better situational awareness at higher echelons of the command hierarchy. The data can be automatically transmitted to a command center, and can communicate with higher echelons. The radar data can also be displayed on a remote screen to protect operators from any targeted attacks on the radar. The operators can also remotely change the scanning sector. Many radars can be networked together to work in tandem and increase the accuracy and provide more information.

The Radar is designed to operate in harsh environments ranging from -20 to +55 °C, in hot and humid conditions, and can be safely stored from -40 to +70 °C. It can operate at high altitudes up to 16,000 feet (4,900 m). Shock and vibration performance and resistance to electromagnetic interference (EMI)/electromagnetic compatibility (EMC) are according to international military standards. The WLR is designed for quick deployment and decamp, and can be ready for action within 30 minutes. In case of any incoming threats, the radar can be quickly moved out of the threat area.

=== Platform ===
The WLR is configured on a wheeled Tatra truck platform. The trucks are manufactured by BEML in India under license. The WLR is designed to operate in a high-density fire environment and has all weather capability, high mobility and quick reaction time. The system is a two vehicle configuration, with the primary sensor, processors, displays and control unit on a single vehicle, and a separate power vehicle to power the radar. The radar data can also be displayed remotely.

== Variants ==
- Swathi Mk1 (Plains) - based on Tatra 8x8 truck platform.
- Swathi Mk2 (Mountains) - based on Tatra 6x6 truck platform. To be used in mountainous terrains with ease of mobility.

== Orders ==
- On 29 March 2015, the Defence Acquisition Council (DAC) cleared the procurement of 30 Swathi WLRs. The contract to Bharat Electronics was worth ₹1,605 crore (equivalent to ₹24 billion or US$250 million in 2023). The DRDO officially handed over the WLR Swathi to the Indian Army on 2 March 2017 for service induction. All units delivered by 2022 and deployed along Line of Control.
- Armenia had conducted trials of similar systems offered by Russia and Poland, but they gave the final nod to the Indian system. The deal is for supplying four SWATHI weapon locating radars manufactured by BEL at a cost of $40 million to Armenia. As per the agreement, India will supply four SWATHI weapon locating radars. In February 2023, it was reported that Armenia recently arrested an armenian army Captain who was providing sensitive information about the radar to undisclosed foreign agencies for money.
- In December 2021, six Swathi Mountain variants were ordered all of which were delivered by March 2023.
- On 30 March 2023, MoD signed a contract for WLR Swathi (Plains) with BEL at a cost of over ₹990 crore (US$100 million). Induction was planned to be completed in 24 months. Proposal for the contract was initiated in May 2022. Last of the radar was delivered on 5 March 2025.

== Operational history ==
Swathi Weapon Locating Radar was used by the Indian military during Operation Sindoor in 2025 India–Pakistan conflict.

== Operators ==
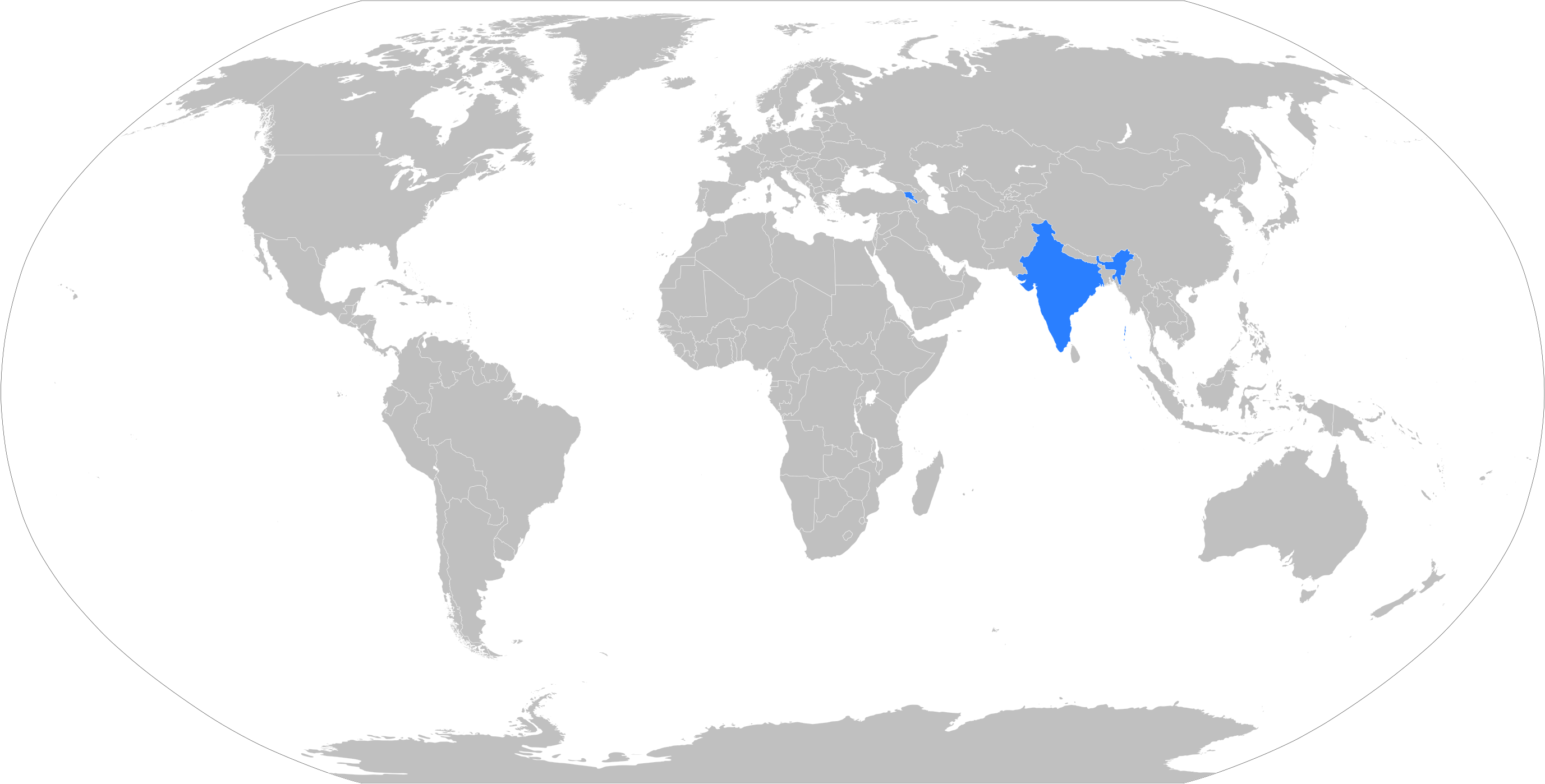
Map of Swathi WLR operators in blue

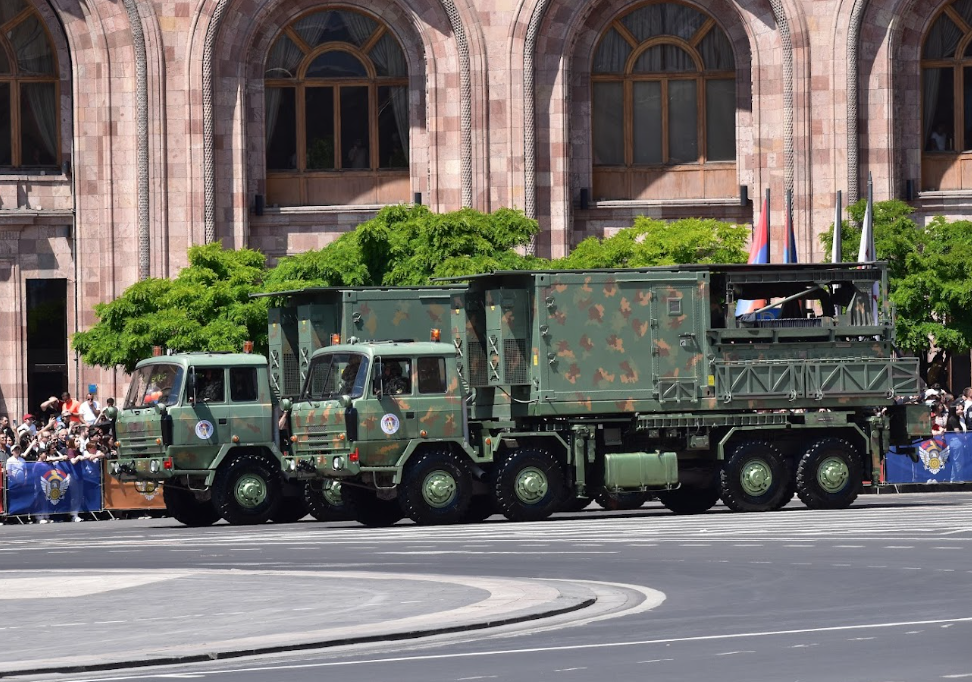
Swathi WLR of the Armenian Ground Forces

India

- Indian Army :
  - Plains variant: 43 in service
  - Mountains variant: 6 Mk2 in service.

Armenia

- Armenian Ground Forces : 4 in service Designation: Paylatsu (lit. 'Mercury').

== Specifications ==
=== Performance ===
- Range:
  - > 81 mm mortars: 2–20 km
  - > 105 mm guns: 2–30 km
  - Unguided rockets: 4–48 km
- Elevation coverage: −5 to 75°
- Azimuth coverage: ±45° mean settable bearing
- Slewability: ±135° within 30 seconds.
- Targets tracking: 7 simultaneously (maximum)
- Firing angles: Both High & Low
- Aspect angles: 0–180°

=== Technical specifications ===
- Instrumented range: 50 km
- Frequency band: C band
- Probability of:
  - Detection: 0.9
  - False alarm: 10^{−6}
- Weapon locations: 99 stored (maximum)
- Digital map storage: 100 × 100 km

=== Environmental specifications ===
- Operating temperature: –20 to +55 °C
- Storage temperature: –40 to +70 °C
- Damp heat: 95% RH at 40 °C
- Operational altitude: Up to 16,000 feet (4,900 m)

== See also ==
- Counter-battery radar
- AN/TPQ-36 Firefinder radar
- AN/TPQ-37 Firefinder radar
- ARTHUR (military)
- Penicillin (counter-artillery system)
- Red Color
- SLC-2 Radar
