= AN/TPS-63 =

Mobile radar system

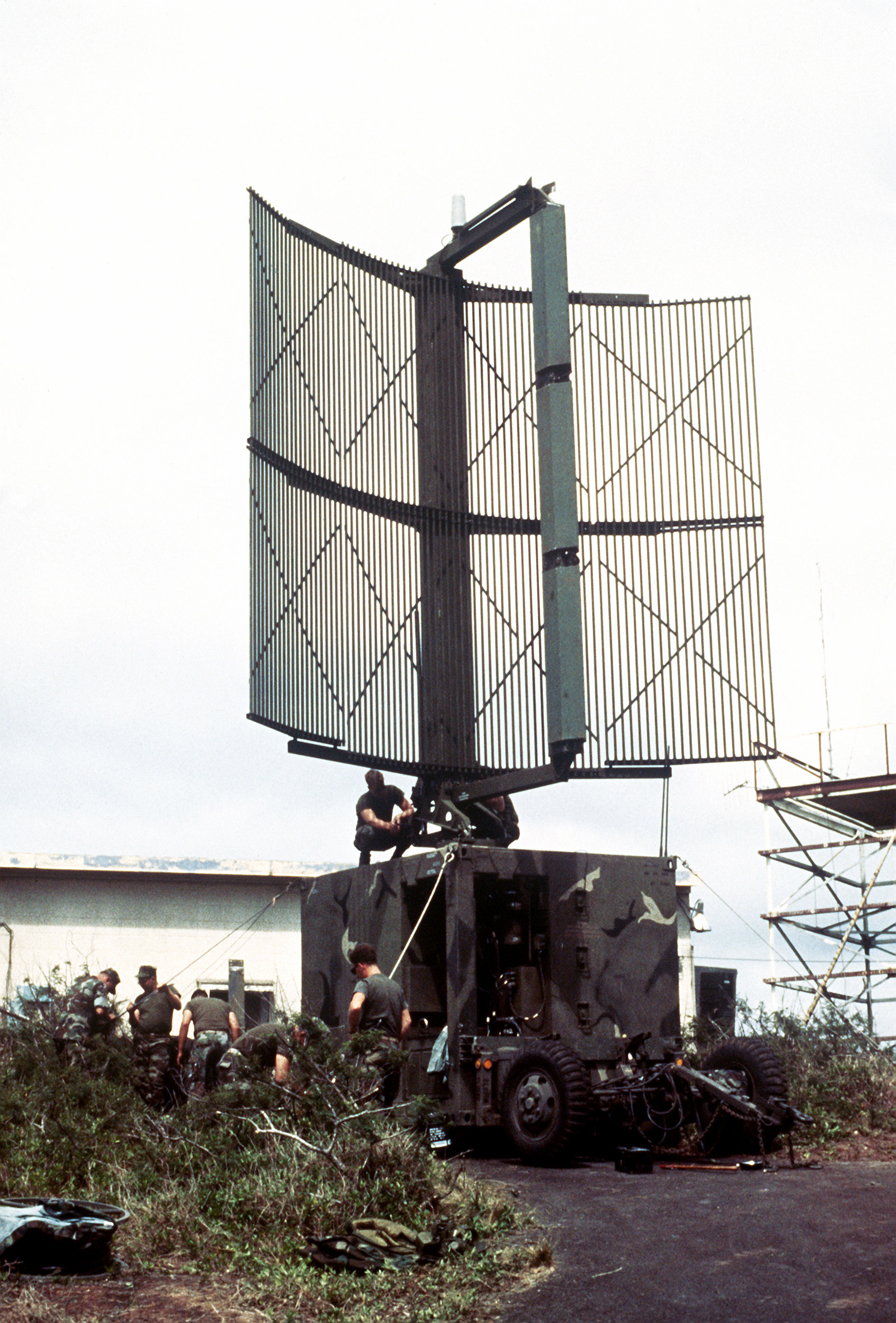
- Country of origin: United States
- Introduced: 1978
- No. built: 97
- Type: Short/Medium Range Radar System
- Frequency: 1.25 to 1.35 GHz (24.0 to 22.2 cm)
- PRF: 300, 375, 500, 750 Hz
- Pulsewidth: 41 microseconds
- RPM: 6, 12, 15
- Range: 150 nmi (170 mi; 280 km)
- Altitude: 40,000 ft (12 km)
- Azimuth: 360°
- Power: 50 or 60 Hz, 20 kW

The AN/TPS-63 was a medium range, two-dimensional, L band radar system utilized by the US Marine Corps from the early 1980s until finally retired in 2018. This mobile radar was developed by Northrop Grumman and complimented the AN/TPS-59 long range radar by providing 360°, gap-filling coverage of low altitude areas. Because it was more mobile, the TPS-63 was also employed as the first radar ashore during amphibious operations until the larger and more capable AN/TPS-59 was established. The TPS-63 was used in combat operations during the Gulf War, the 2003 invasion of Iraq and subsequent operations in Iraq and Afghanistan. The TPS-63 was eventually phased out of service in 2018 as it was replaced by the AN/TPS-80 Ground/Air Task Oriented Radar.

== Mission and description ==
Provided tactical surveillance and detection of low-flying aircraft in clutter weather and electronic interference. The radar operated as part of an overall tactical air defense or tactical air operations system. The radar's antenna was a parabolic cylinder which allowed for the combination of electronic and physical steering of the beams. The antenna could be broken down into multiple sections and stored inside the radar shelter which allowed for increased mobility and decreased disassembly time. As a mobile radar, the AN/TPS-63 was able to be set up within one hour of arriving at a new location.

In accordance with the Joint Electronics Type Designation System (JETDS), the "AN/TPS-63" designation represents the 63rd design of an Army-Navy electronic device for ground transportable search radar system. The JETDS system also now is used to name all Department of Defense electronic systems.

== Development ==
In September 1971, the United States Navy released its first solicitations for the AN/TPS-63. The first contract was awarded in June 1974 to Northrup Grumman's Electronic Sensors and Systems Division in Baltimore, Maryland which was formerly the Westinghouse Electronics Systems Group. The first system was completed in September 1976 and shipped to Marine Air Control Squadron 2 (MACS-2) at Marine Corps Air Station Kaneohe Bay, Hawaii for operational test and evaluation. The system went into full-rate production beginning in February 1978. The Marine Corps received its last TPS-63 in Fiscal Year 1981. In 1985, the Marine Corps initiated additional upgrades to the radar to include the addition of a side lobe antenna for operations in a higher threat environment.

== Operational use ==
Marine Air Control Squadrons 1 & 2 utilized the AN/TPS-63 during the 2003 invasion of Iraq. Both squadrons were initially consolidated at Tactical Assembly Area Coyote, in the northern Kuwaiti desert. The -63 radar was used in conjunction with the AN/TPS-59 to provide early warning, assist air defense controllers with strike coordination and reconnaissance, and coordinate allied aircraft use of kill boxes in support of coalition forces.

Depot level maintenance for the AN/TPS-63 was conducted at the Tobyhanna Army Depot, Pennsylvania from 2011 until 2018 when the radar was decommissioned.

== Other users ==
The AN/TPS-63 was a popular sensor for Foreign Military Sales. Other nations that utilized the radar include: Egypt, Israel, Jordan, South Korea, Kuwait, Mexico, Morocco, Saudi Arabia, Taiwan, Turkey, United Arab Emirates, Yugoslavia (8), Serbia, and Venezuela.

== Variants ==
- AN/TPS-65 - adapted as an airfield surveillance radar for air traffic control
- W-630 - commercial version of the radar.
- Low Altitude Surveillance Radar (LASS) - Aerostat containing an AN/TPS-63

== See also ==
- List of radars
- List of United States Marine Corps aviation support units
- List of military electronics of the United States

== Bibliography ==
- Saint, Patricia D. (2015). 23 Days to baghdad: U.S. Marine Aviation Combat Element in Iraq, 2003 (PDF). Quantico, VA: History Division, United States Marine Corps.
