= Penicillin (counter-artillery system) =

Acoustic-thermal artillery-reconnaissance system

Penicillin or 1B75 Penicillin is an acoustic-thermal artillery-reconnaissance system developed by Ruselectronics for the Russian Armed Forces. The system aims to detect and locate enemy artillery, mortars, MLRs, and anti-aircraft or tactical-missile firing positions with seismic and acoustic sensors without emitting any radio waves. It locates enemy fire within 5 seconds at a range of 25 km (16 mi; 13 nmi). Penicillin completed state trials in December 2018 and entered combat duty in 2020.

== Design ==
The Penicillin is mounted on the 8x8 Kamaz-6350 chassis and consists of a 1B75 sensor suite placed on a telescopic boom for the infrared and visible spectrum as well as several ground-installed seismic and acoustic receivers as a part of the 1B76 sensor suite. It has an effective range for communication with other military assets up to 40 kilometres (25 mi) and is capable of operating even in a fully automatic mode without any crew. One system can reportedly cover an entire division against an enemy fire. Besides that, it co-ordinates and corrects friendly artillery fire.

== Operators ==
Russia

- Russian Ground Forces

== See also ==
- Zoopark-1
- Aistyonok
- ARTHUR (radar)
- AN/TPQ-37 Firefinder radar
- Swathi Weapon Locating Radar
