= ThalesRaytheonSystems =

French-American Joint Venture

Thales-Raytheon Systems Company LLC
- Company type: Private joint venture
- Industry: Aerospace, defence
- Founded: June 2001
- Headquarters: Massy, France; Fullerton, California, United States
- Key people: Philippe Duhamel (Chief Executive Officer)
- Products: Air operation command and control systems, battlefield radars, ground-based weapon-locating radars, surveillance radars
- Services: Maintenance, repair, logistic support, technical assistance, software support, test benchmarking, upgradation and system life extension services
- Owner: Raytheon Technologies (50%); Thales Group (50%)
- Number of employees: 1,600
- Website: www.thalesraytheon.com

Thales-Raytheon Systems Company LLC (ThalesRaytheonSystems or TRS) is an aerospace and defence company co-headquartered in Massy, France and Fullerton, California, United States. It is operated as a 50:50 joint venture between Raytheon Technologies (formerly Raytheon Company) and Thales Group.

ThalesRaytheon was formed in June 2001 to combine the radar and Command, Control, Communications, Computers and Intelligence or C4I systems product lines of the two firms. aerospace control systems. In addition to the supply of various defense electronics systems, the company provides maintenance, repair, logistic support, technical assistance, software support, overhaul, and system life extension services to end users.

== History ==
On 16 December 2000, French electronics and defense specialist Thales S.A. and American defense contractor Raytheon Company announced the creation of ThalesRaytheon Systems. Prior to this, the two companies already cooperated on 17 individual programs of various sizes; they both possessed extensive military electronics product lines that generated between $500 million and $700 million in annual revenue by 2000. Upon its formation, ThalesRaytheon Systems held roughly 40 percent of the global market for air defense command and control centers, air defense radars and battlefield surveillance systems.

In March 2002, ThalesRaytheonSystems received a contract valued at roughly $99 million from the French defence procurement agency (DGA) to deliver the first version of the mobile command and control centre (C3M); this system formed the deployable component of France’s Air Command and Control System.

During 2008, American defense conglomerate Lockheed Martin entered into a commercial relationship with ThalesRaytheonSystems to deliver NATO's Theater Missile Defence capability. During July 2018, Lockheed Martin and ThalesRaytheonSystems signed a teaming agreement to deepen their cooperation and to jointly pursue the provision of a territorial Ballistic Missile Defence (BMD) command and control capability to NATO member states.

In February 2011, ThalesRaytheonSystems, was awarded a contract by NATO ACCS Management Agency (NACMA) to implement various enhancements to the Air Command and Control System (ACCS) as a part of the Active Layered Theatre Ballistic Missile Defence (ALTBMD). The improvements included sensor and weapon system configuration, management and coverage, air and missile track processing, dissemination, classification, display and alerting modifications. Four years later, the firm was awarded a follow-on contract covering further functionality improvements by NATO.

During June 2016, ThalesRaytheonSystems was restructured at the direction of its parent companies, it was restructured to focus solely on NATO agencies and NATO member nations for the delivery of the Air Command and Control System, Theatre Missile Defense, and Ballistic Missile Defense. The joint venture's former business in ground-based radars and non-ACCS-related air command and control systems transitioned back to their parent companies.

In July 2019, Italian aerospace conglomerate Leonardo S.p.A. signed a memorandum of understanding with ThalesRaytheonSystems to cooperation on air command and control system (ACCS) for NATO customers.
