= AN/TPQ-37 Firefinder radar =

US mobile counter-battery radar system

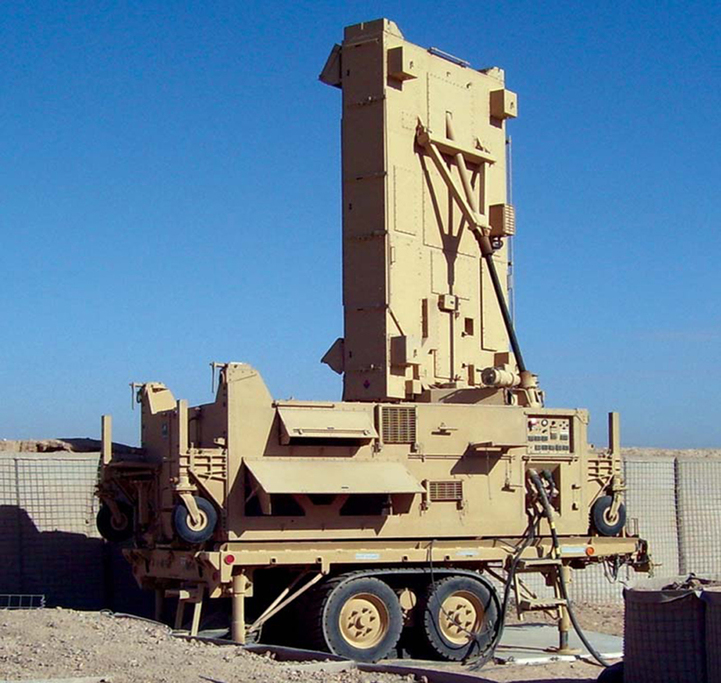
AN/TPQ-37 Firefinder radar

AN/TPQ-37 Firefinder Weapon Locating System is a mobile radar system developed in the late 1970s by Hughes Aircraft Company, achieving Initial Operational Capability in 1980 and full deployment in 1984. Currently manufactured by ThalesRaytheonSystems, the system is a long-range version of "weapon-locating radar", designed to detect and track incoming artillery and rocket fire to determine the point of origin for counter-battery fire. It is currently in service at brigade and higher levels in the United States Army and by other countries. The radar is trailer-mounted and towed by a 2 1/3-short-ton (2,100 kg) truck. A typical AN/TPQ-37 system consists of the Antenna-Transceiver Group, Command Shelter and 60 kW Generator.

Twelve of the radar systems had been delivered to the Indian Army by 2007 under a deal signed in 2002 as a cost of around $200 million. Carrier vehicles and support systems were supplied by Bharat Earth Movers Limited (now, BEML).

In accordance with the Joint Electronics Type Designation System (JETDS), the "AN/TPQ-37" designation represents the 37th design of an Army-Navy electronic device for ground transportable special combination radar system. The JETDS system also now is used to name all Department of Defense electronic systems.

== Operation ==
The AN/TPQ-37 is an electronically steered radar, meaning the radar does not actually move while in operation. The radar scans a 90-degree sector for incoming rocket, artillery and mortar fire. Upon detecting a possible incoming round, the system verifies the contact before initiating a track sequence, continuing to search for new targets. The incoming round/rocket is tracked during its initial upward/launch trajectory (i.e., the linear portion of its flight path) prior to reaching apogee. A computer program analyzes the track data and then extrapolates the round's point of origin. This calculated point of origin is then reported to the operator with map coordinates, thus allowing friendly artillery to direct counter-battery fire towards the enemy artillery. The system has a reported range of up to 31 miles (50 km). The system may also be operated in a friendly fire mode to determine the accuracy of counterbattery return fire.

== Main characteristics ==
Capabilities

- Frequency: S-band, 15 frequencies
- Locates mortars, artillery, rocket launchers, and missiles
- Locates targets on first round
- Performs high-burst, datum-plane, and impact registrations
- Adjusts friendly fire
- Interfaces with tactical fire
- Predicts impact of hostile projectiles

Specifications

- Azimuth sector: 1600 mils (90 degrees)
- Prime power: 115/200 VAC, 400 Hz, 3-phase, 43 kW
- Peak transmitted power: 120 kW, min.

Features

- Permanent storage for 99 targets
- Field exercise mode
- Digital data interface

== Manufacturer ==
Before acquisition by Raytheon, the Hughes Aircraft Co. developed the AN/TPQ-37 Firefinder radar at its facility in Fullerton, California, and manufactures it at its plant in Forest, Mississippi.

== Upgrades ==
ROCS for AN/TPQ-36 and AN/TPQ-37

The 'radar operational control system upgrade' is manufactured by BES Electronic Systems Ltd in Israel

- The WLU drum is replaced with two 19" LCD screens. Weapon Locations and impacts are displayed on electronic map.
- Radar Shelter includes two Work-Stations for two radar operators. Additional operators can join with optional Notebooks.
- Windows XP Embedded, menus, screens and full GIS electronic maps.
- Automatic operation and high speed AHC using DTED Level II (30 meters between elevation points) to enhance accuracy of weapon location process.
- Support of many digital formats of electronic maps, for example GeoTIFF, Shape files, CADRG, DXF, etc.
- Weapon locations are displayed on various projections such as UTM, GIS, RSO, Lambert, etc.
- Automatic Initialization. High-speed radar programs loading from ROCS computer. (Raymond Cassette is removed)
- Shelter can be controlled from remote using Notebook via LAN.
- Recording of radar operation for off line debriefing. Recording includes weapons, impacts, Friendly registration targets, etc.
- Storage of up to 500 hostile targets.
- 50 Artillery Zones, defined by clicking the electronic map.
- Option for custom-made protocols to communicate radar data and targets to remote Users such as Command & Control, batteries, etc.
- UPS with enhanced 28VDC supply system.

== See also ==
- List of radars
- COBRA (radar)
- ARTHUR (military)
- SLC-2 Radar
- Swathi Weapon Locating Radar
- Penicillin (counter-artillery system)
- Red Color
- List of military electronics of the United States
