= SLC-2 Radar =

Chinese weapon identification radar

The SLC-2 Radar is a Chinese active electronically scanned array counter-battery radar designed to locate hostile artillery, rocket and ground-to-ground missile launchers immediately after firing, and to support friendly artillery by guiding counter-battery fire.

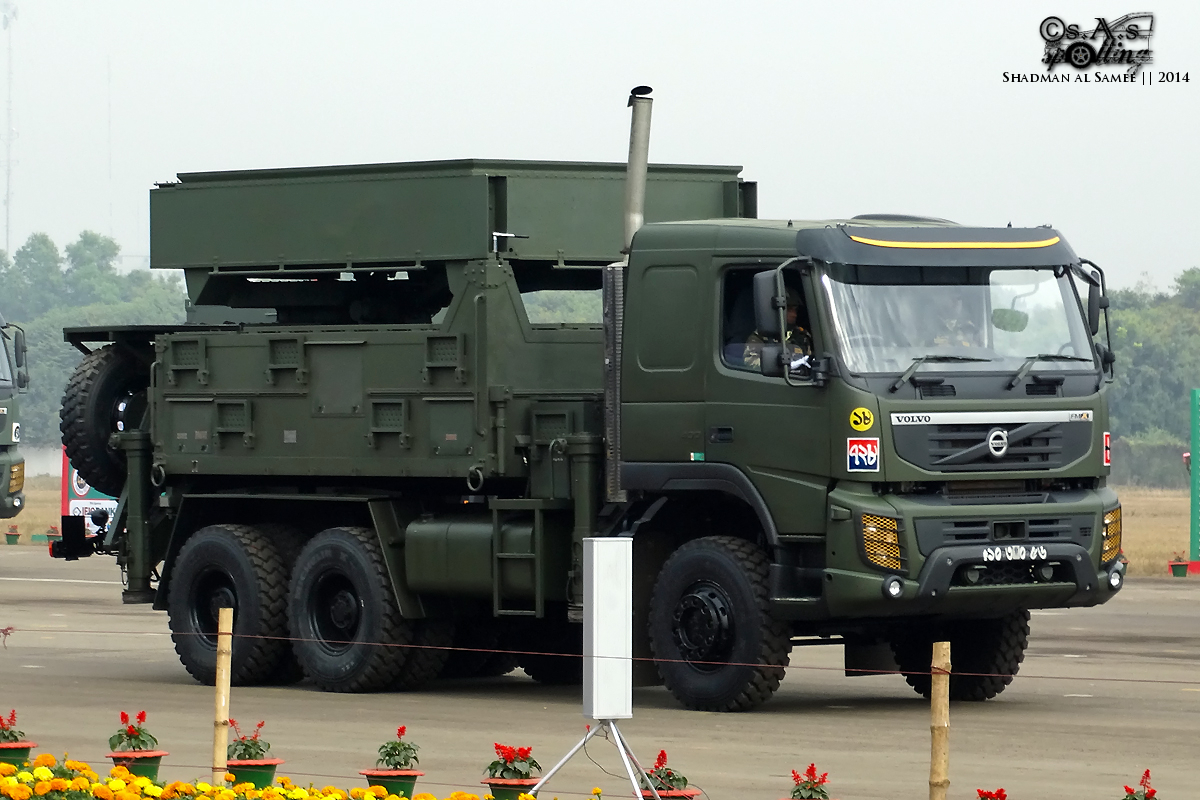
SLC-2 Radar of Bangladesh Army

SLC-2 radar can also be applied in adjusting firing of friendly weapons or rockets. With slight modification to software parameters the radar can also be used to detect and track low flying targets such as light aircraft, helicopters and RPVs.

SLC-2 systems have sometimes been mounted on a Dongfeng EQ2102 3.5 ton truck.

== Development ==
Four AN/TPQ-37 Firefinder radars were sold to China, and these became the foundation of the SLC-2 radar development. Aside from political reasons, the US$10 million plus unit price tag of the TPQ-37 (including after sale logistic support) was simply too costly for the Chinese. The decision was made to develop a domestic equivalent after mastering the technologies of the TPQ-37. After the initial test of the TPQ-37 in Tangshan (汤山) Range near Nanjing in 1988, and in Xuanhua District in October of the same year, several shortcomings of the TPQ-37 were discovered, and further intensive tests were conducted and completed in 1994.

The requirement of the Chinese domestic equivalent was subsequently modified to address these issues revealed in trials. Due to the limitation of the Chinese industrial capability at the time, decision was made to develop the Chinese domestic equivalent in several steps. The first step was to develop a smaller one, which would result in the Chinese equivalent of the AN/TPQ-36 Firefinder, and based on the experience gained from this program, a more capable larger version in the same class of the AN/TPQ-37 Firefinder would be developed, which eventually resulted in SLC-2 series.

== Type 373 radar ==
This is the predecessor of SLC-2 radar, using older passive electronically scanned array technology. Type 373 radar is fielded after the Type 704 radar series, which Type 373 radar is based on. The Type 373 radar is designed to specifically improve the performance of the TPQ-37 by solving the shortcoming revealed in tests. One limitation of the TPQ-37 revealed in tests was that it was less effective against projectiles with flat trajectory, so it was much more effective against high-angle howitzer and mortar rounds than rounds from the M-46 and its Chinese derivative Type 59–1. Type 373 radar was designed to improve the capability against flat trajectory rounds.

Another problem revealed in the tests was that the TPQ-37's reliability was much lower than claimed. The reason was that when the TPQ-37 was deployed in environments with high humidity and high level of rainfall (southern China), high salinity (coastal regions), high altitude (southwestern China), and subjected to daily high temperature differences (northwestern China), malfunctions occurred more frequently. The Type 373 radar was designed specifically to improve the reliability against these harsh environmental factors.

== SLC-2 ==
As Chinese capability in microelectronics matured, an updated version of passive phased array Type 373 radar was developed, designated the SLC-2. This is a fully solid-state, highly digitized version that adopts planar active phased array antenna.

One of the shortcomings of TPQ-37 revealed in tests was in its multi-targeting capability. When enemy artillery batteries located more than two hundred meters apart fired simultaneously, the TPQ-37 could provide accurate coordinate for distance, but coordinates for positions were less accurate. This would not be a problem for most users because TPQ-37 can be used in pairs in conjunction, provide accurate coordinates for locations. However, these costly radars could not be purchased in large numbers and China thus developed the capability for SLC-2 to provide accurate coordinates for both distance and position. Myanmar Army currently operating as many as 27 SLC-2 radars for artillery force. Bangladesh Bought two in 2012. Pakistan also operates significant number of SLC-2 Radar

Analysts say that footage of Pakistan's artillery deployments have shown that Pakistan has used SLC-2 radar alongside the A-100E.

== Specifications ==
- S - band
- Detection range: (for 80% detection probability against 81-mm mortar rounds sized target)
  - For artillery—35 km
  - For rockets—50 km
- Accuracy: 0.35% of range (for range more than 10 km)
  - 35 m (for range less than 10 km)
- Peak power: 45 kW
- Noise: 3 dB
- Clutter improvement factor: 55 dB
- Other features:
  - Active phased array antenna with electronic scanning both in azimuth and elevation
  - Sophisticated computer-controlled digital signal processing
  - Comprehensive online or offline BITE
  - Automatic/manual height correction with digital/video map
  - Various effective ECCM
  - Tracking while scanning
