= Red Color =

Early warning radar system of the Israel Defense Forces

The Red Color (Hebrew: צבע אדום, transl.: Tzeva Adom, i.e. code red) is an early-warning radar system originally installed by the Israel Defense Forces in several towns surrounding the Gaza Strip to warn civilians of imminent attack by rockets (usually Qassam rockets). Outside of areas originally serviced by the Red Color system, standard air raid sirens are used to warn of rocket attacks.

The system originally operated in areas around the so-called Gaza envelope, including in Sderot. When the signature of a rocket launch is detected, the system automatically activates the public broadcast warning system in nearby Israeli communities and military bases. A recorded female voice, intoning the Hebrew words for Red Color ("Tzeva Adom"), is broadcast 4 times. A intermittent tone with 2-second intervals between sound and pause is transmitted after the pre-recorded female voice in case the missile attacks do not cease after a certain time. The entire alert system is repeated until all rockets have been shot down and no further launches are detected.

The system was installed in Ashkelon between July 2005 and April 2006.

Up to June 2006, the announcement was called Red Dawn (Hebrew: שחר אדום, transl.: Shakhar Adom) but it was changed to the Hebrew words for Red Color (Hebrew: צבע אדום, transl.: Tzeva Adom) due to a complaint made by a 7-year-old girl named Shakhar (Hebrew for dawn).

It was the subject of a documentary, which focused on how children are to cope with an alert, directed by Yoav Shoam.

Since 2014, alerts have been available as an app on iPhone and Android from the App Store and Play Store. It was the most downloaded app in Israel in July 2014 during Operation Protective Edge. Users can select to receive alerts for rocket attacks nationwide, or only in their districts.

Red Color (Tzeva Adom) alarm and Gazan Qassam rocket attacks on Sderot, Israel – 2007

In October 2023 it was reported that a version of the system modified to suit Ukraine "would start working in Kyiv soon" to warn against the Russian missile strikes of the Russian invasion of Ukraine. It became active in Kyiv on 24 July 2025.

== See also ==
- Counter-battery radar
- List of Qassam Rocket Attacks
- Iron Dome – an Israeli air defense system for short-range projectiles
