= Ground Master 400 =

Mobile long-range radar system

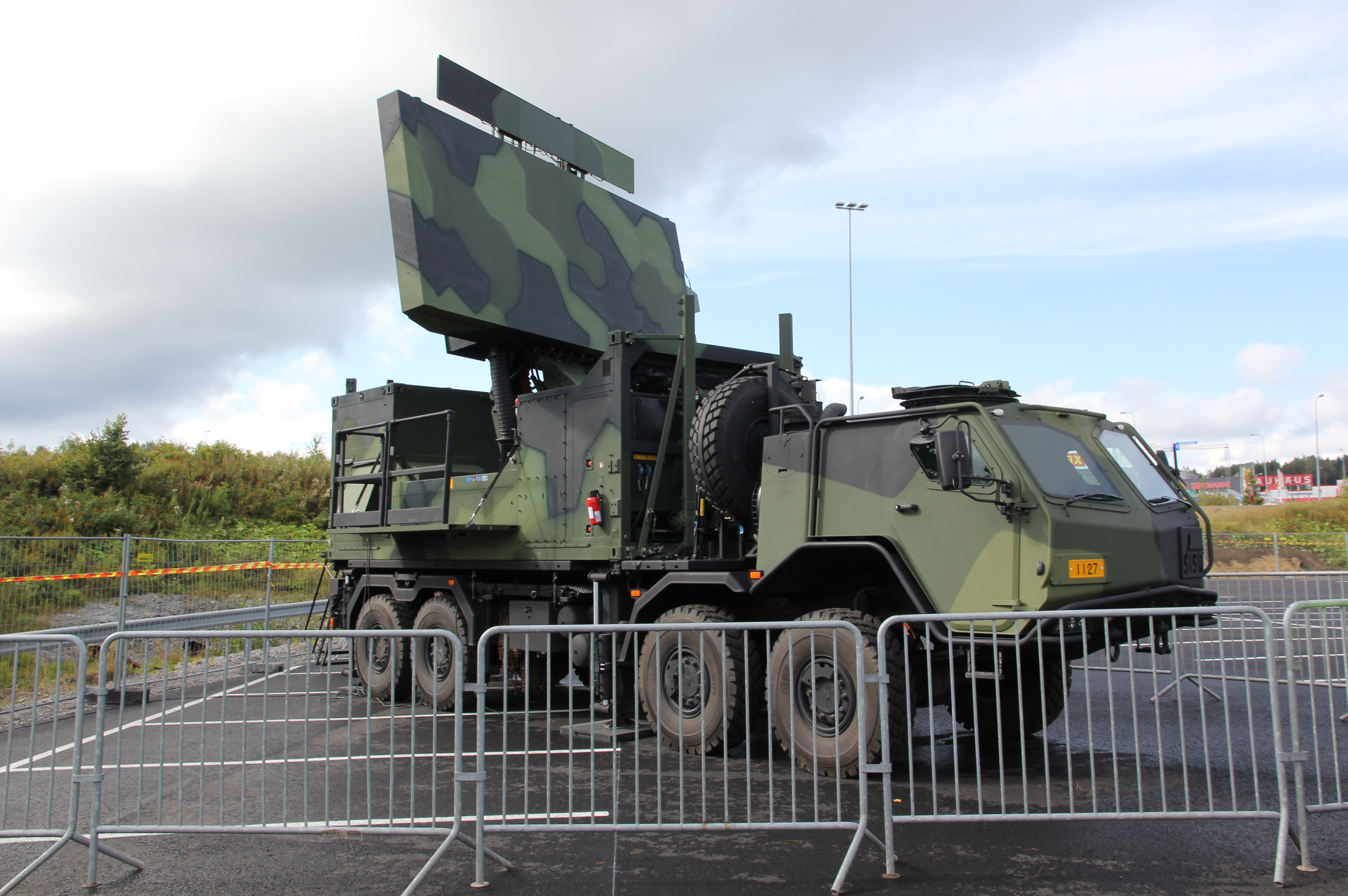
- Finnish Ground Master 403
- Country of origin: France
- Introduced: 2007
- No. built: >90
- Type: Digital 3D AESA
- Frequency: S banded
- RPM: 10
- Range: 470 km (290 mi) GM400; 515 km (320 mi) GM400α
- Altitude: 30,500 m (100,100 ft)
- Azimuth: 360°
- Elevation: 20° and 40-60°
- Precision: <50 m (160 ft)

The Ground Master 400 (GM400) is a mobile long range radar system manufactured by Thales (formerly by Thales-Raytheon Systems). GM400 is a fully digital active electronically scanned array long-range air defense 3D radar, offering detection from very high to very low altitudes. It tracks a wide range of targets from highly maneuverable tactical aircraft flying below several hundred feet to the unconventional small radar cross section devices, such as UAVs or cruise missiles.

The system can be set up by a four-man crew in 60 minutes and can be remotely operated. The system fits in a 20-feet shipping container and weighs less than ten tons. The system can be rapidly deployed mounted on a 6x6 or 8x8 tactical truck and can be transported by a single C-130 aircraft or a helicopter.

The GM400 with a field-proven operational availability of more than 98,5% and a MTBCF (Mean Time Between Critical Failures) of 3500 hrs has been selected by many countries as well as France to protect the European Space Agency's Guiana Space Centre. The system was to be operational by the end of 2012.

The GM400 family includes the GM403 and the GM406. The GM406 has a transmitter which is twice as powerful as the GM403, giving it 20% greater range, increasing from 390 km to 450 km. The GM406 is primarily designed to equip fixed sites, with the GM403 designed to be deployable.

In 2023, the Indonesian state-run defense company PT Len Industri acquired 13 GM403 radars at an approximate cost of $30,000,000 each, totaling $390,000,000. While there is no publicly available information on the cost of the GM406 model, it is estimated that the price of a GM403 radar is around $30,000,000, excluding any additional modifications that may be requested by buyers.

In 2021, Thales introduced a new version, GM400α, with 5 times more processing power, extended range from 470 to 515 km and upcoming advanced artificial intelligence algorithms.

These systems are part of the Ground Master family of radars (alongside the medium range GM200 and GM200 MM/A and MM/C as well as the short-range GM60 and its variants) and have been purchased by many countries.

== Main characteristics ==
- Air Surveillance Radar
- Crew: 4
- S-band, 3D AESA Radar
- GaN technology
- Modern algorithm to mitigate windfarm effect
- 10 RPM Rotation Rate
- High, medium and low-altitude detection, long-range air defense sensor
- Detects fixed- and rotary-wing aircraft, cruise missiles, UAVs, and tactical ballistic missiles
- Coverage:
  - Azimuth: 360°
  - Elevation: 20° and 40°
- Performance:
  - Detection range:
    - Fighter aircraft: > 450 km
    - Cruise missile: > 250 km
  - Max detection rate in altitude: 30.5 km
  - Instrumented range: 515 km
- High mobility, transportability, and reliability
- GM400 requires minimum maintenance (30 hours/year)
- Technical characteristics:
  - Digital Beam Forming
  - Stacked beam (maximum time on target) technology
  - S-Band (high part 2.9 / 3.3 GHz)
  - Clear & Doppler modes
  - Electronic Counter-CounterMeasures (ECCM) capabilities
  - Tactical ballistic missile (TBM) detection capability.

== Operators ==
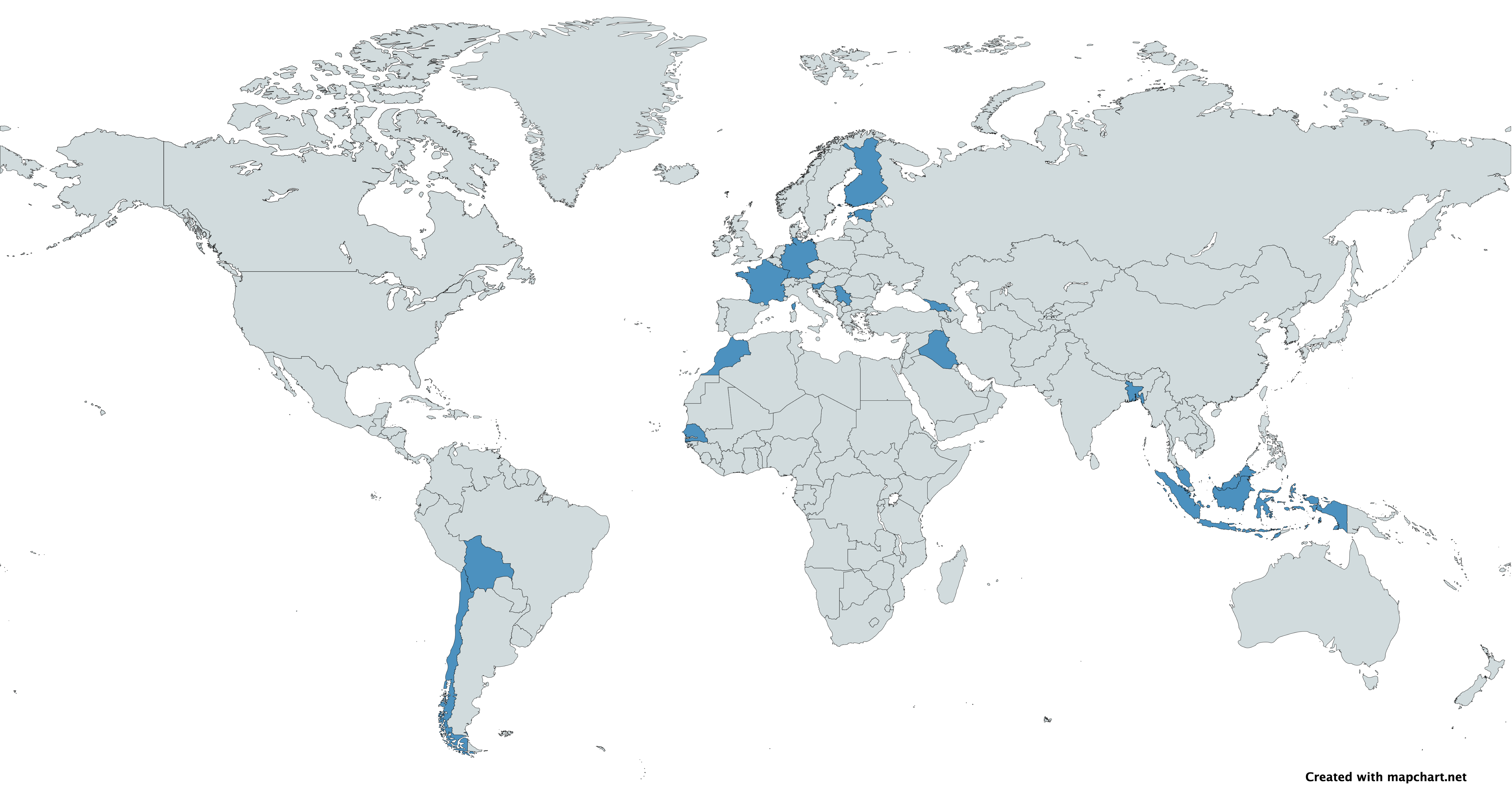
Map with Ground Master 400 operators in blue

- Albania: 1 GM400α
- Bangladesh: 2 GM403M systems.
- Bolivia
- Bulgaria: 7 GM400α ordered in 2026
- Chile: 9 systems
- Egypt: 4 GM400
- Estonia: 2 GM 403 ordered in 2010, and 2 GM400α ordered in 2023
- Finland: 12 GM403 Local designation is Keva 2010.
- France: 3 GM406 and 12 GM403
- Georgia: 6 GM403
- Germany: 6 systems
- Indonesia: 13 GM403
- Iraq: 4 GM403
- Ireland: 4 GM400α ordered
- Kazakhstan
- Malaysia: 1 GM400. 3 GM400α on order.
- Morocco: 3 GM403, and 2 GM400
- Qatar: GM400α ordered 2026
- Netherlands: 1 GM400α
- Senegal: 2 GM400
- Serbia: 3 GM400α
- Slovenia: 2 GM403

== See also ==
- KALKAN Air Defence Radar
- TAFLIR, another ground-based, non-fixed (i.e., transportable) search radar (AN/TPS)
- AN/TPS-43
- AN/TPS-75
- ALP 300-G
