= AN/APS-154 =

Multifunction radar

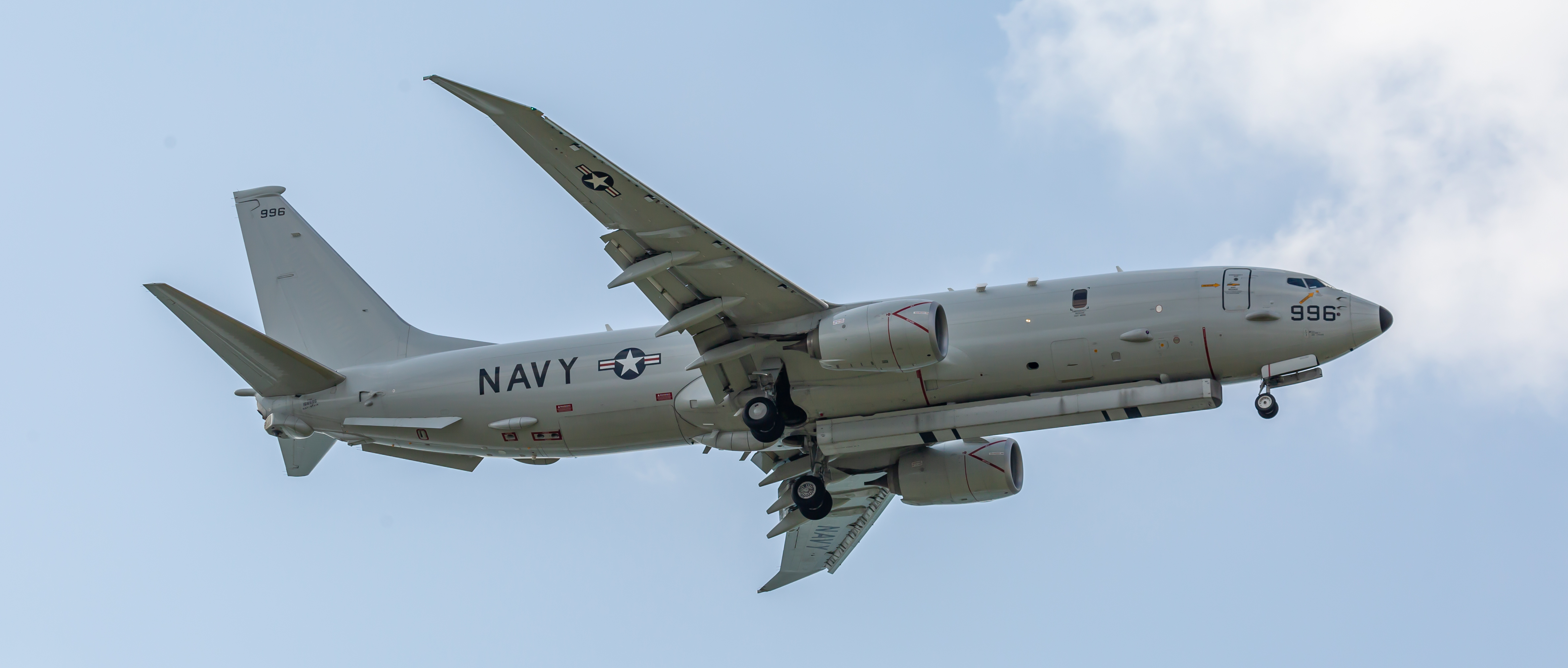
A US Navy P-8 Poseidon with an AN/APS-154 attached to its belly

The AN/APS-154 Advanced Airborne Sensor (AAS) is a multifunction radar installed on the P-8 Poseidon maritime patrol aircraft. The radar is built by Raytheon as a follow-on to their AN/APS-149 Littoral Surveillance Radar System (LSRS).

The AAS has its roots in the highly classified AN/APS-149 LSRS, which was designed to provide multi-function moving target detection and tracking and high resolution ground mapping at standoff ranges covering land, littoral, and water areas. The radar was deployed on a small number of P-3C Orions, with "game changing" results. Containing a double-sided AESA radar with near 360-degree coverage, it could scan, map, track, and classify targets, and do all of these tasks near simultaneously; it was reportedly sensitive enough to pick up a formation of people moving over open terrain. Building upon the LSRS, the AAS also has a double-sided AESA radar, which contains a moving target indicator (MTI) that can detect, classify, and track targets on land and at sea at the same time, with synthetic aperture radar (SAR) and inverse synthetic aperture radar (ISAR) for picture-like radar imagery of both inland and ocean areas at the same time; these can profile vessels from a long distance and generate fine resolution without relying on optical sensors, especially in day or night and in adverse weather conditions. Once it detects and classifies a hostile vessel, the P-8 can send targeting information to another armed platform and guide a networked weapon (e.g. Tomahawk cruise missiles, SLAM-ER, JASSM, LRASM, SDB II) to it through a data link. The AAS is in ways superior to the AN/APY-7 used on the U.S. Air Force's E-8 Joint STARS, looking both port and starboard rather than just being side-looking.

The AAS may be able to track submerged submarines by the faint tracks of their wakes on the surface of the oceans.

== See also ==
- List of radars
- List of military electronics of the United States
- Phased array
- Active electronically scanned array
