= 5N65 radar =

Soviet military phased array radar

- РЛС 5Н65
- Part of S-225 ABM system, 5K17 measurement system
- Kamchatka, Russia
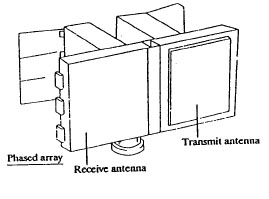
- Drawing of the radar's antenna station by the CIA

Site information
- Type: Active phased array radar station
- Condition: dismantled

Location
- Coordinates: 56.270°N 162.735°E

Site history
- Built: 1975
- Demolished: 2006

Garrison information
- Garrison: formerly в/ч 03253

The 5N65 radar (Russian: РЛС 5Н65, NATO: Flat Twin, also RSN-225 (Russian: РСН-225)) was a Soviet military phased array radar initially designed for the S-225 anti-ballistic missile system which was never commissioned. The radar was later installed near the Kura Test Range in Kamchatka in the Russian Far East as a part of 5K17 (GRAU index) tracking and measuring system and was demolished in 2006.

== S-225 ==
The radar was built as part of the S-225 anti-ballistic missile system (codename of the R&D work: Azov; US name: ABM-X-3), a marginally mobile system designed to defend high status targets against attack by ballistic missiles. Work started on the system in the early 1960s and S-225 was one of three competing systems; A-35 (the one chosen) and "Saturn" were the others.

S-225 was designed by A.A. Raspletin, who worked in special design bureau OKB-31, of KB-1 design bureau. The first design was done in 1964 and the first prototype of the system was installed in Sary Shagan in 1971, at site 53 (46°26′45″N 72°51′23″E). The radar was tested on the descent phase of missiles launched from the Kapustin Yar military launch range. Because of this it was decided that the second prototype should be installed in Kamchatka, near the Kura Test Range, to pick up missiles landing there after being launched elsewhere in the Soviet Union. In 1975 this second prototype was installed and checked in Sary Shagan and then dismantled and shipped to Vladivostok to be installed in Kamchatka.

S-225 consisted of a 5N65 radar, a device transmitting commands to the missiles which NATO called "Pawn Shop", and two types of missiles. One missile, 5Ya27 (developer's name V-825), was designed by OKB Fakel for exoatmospheric intercepts (above the atmosphere). The other, high-acceleration 5Ya26 (aka PRS-1) was designed by OKB Novator for endoatmospheric intercepts (within the atmosphere).

== Radar ==
The 5N65 was a demountable active phased array radar. The CIA estimated it could be installed in six weeks. It contained separate receive and transmit sections. The array was mounted on a pedestal and could be moved in azimuth and elevation. It is listed as being associated with the Russian space surveillance system in 2004.
