= Active electronically scanned array =

Type of phased-array radar

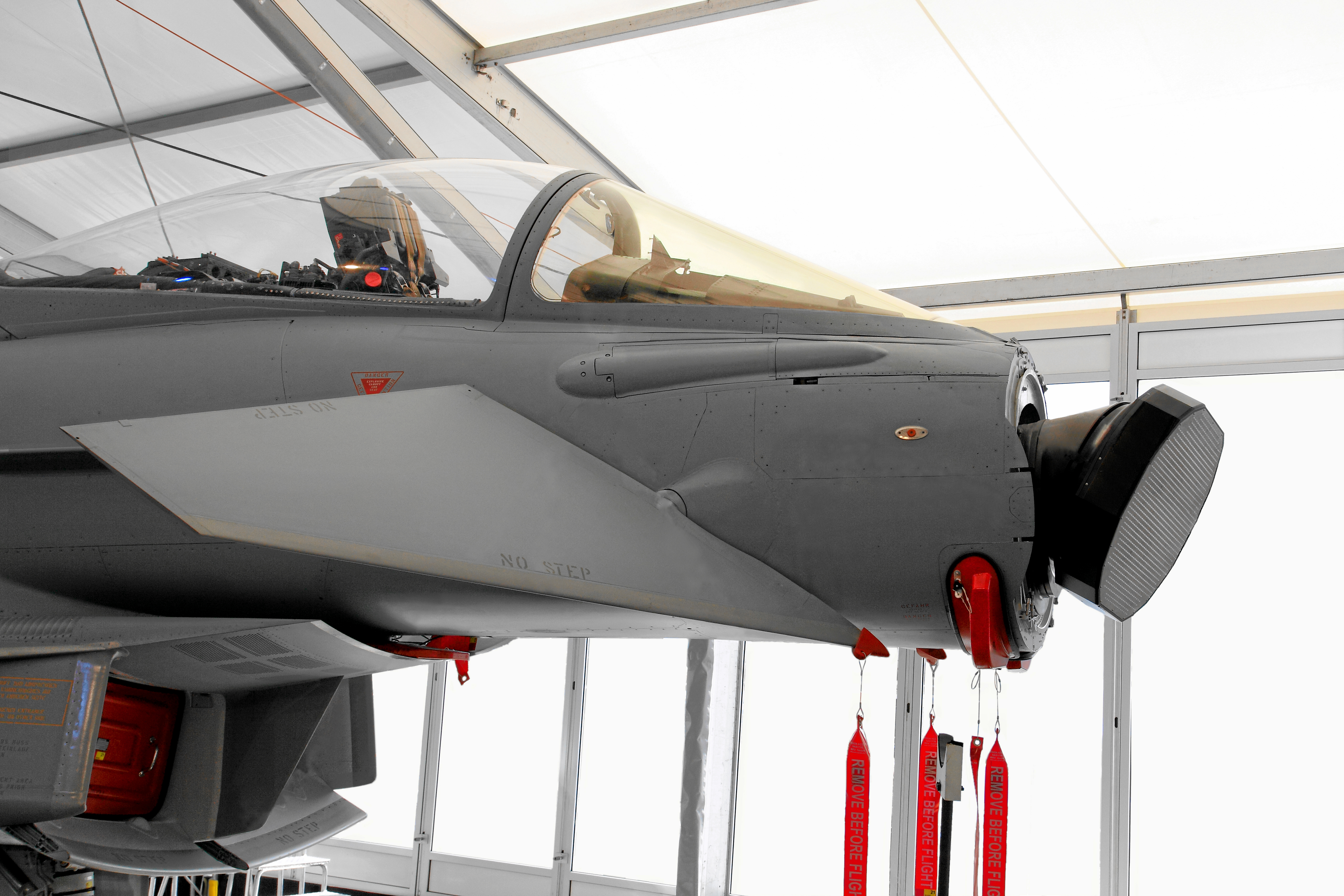
The Eurofighter Typhoon combat aircraft with its nose fairing removed, revealing its Euroradar CAPTOR AESA radar antenna

An active electronically scanned array (AESA) is a type of phased array antenna, which is a computer-controlled antenna array in which the beam of radio waves can be electronically steered to point in different directions without moving the antenna. In the AESA, each antenna element is connected to a small solid-state transmit/receive module (TRM) under the control of a computer, which performs the functions of a transmitter and/or receiver for the antenna. This contrasts with a passive electronically scanned array (PESA), in which all the antenna elements are connected to a single transmitter and/or receiver through phase shifters under the control of the computer. AESA's main use is in radar and these are known as active phased-array radar (APAR).

The AESA is a more advanced, sophisticated, second-generation of the original PESA phased-array technology. PESAs can only emit a single beam of radio waves at a single frequency at a time. The PESA must utilize a Butler matrix if multiple beams are required. The AESA can radiate multiple beams of radio waves at multiple frequencies simultaneously. AESA radars can spread their signal emissions across a wider range of frequencies, which makes them more difficult to detect over background noise, allowing ships and aircraft to radiate powerful radar signals while still remaining stealthy, as well as being more resistant to jamming. Hybrids of AESA and PESA can also be found consisting of subarrays that individually resemble PESAs, where each subarray has its own RF front end. Using a hybrid approach, the benefits of AESA (e.g., multiple independent beams) can be realized at a lower cost compared to pure AESA.

The first ground-based, ship-based and airborne AESA radars became operational in the mid 1990s.

== History ==
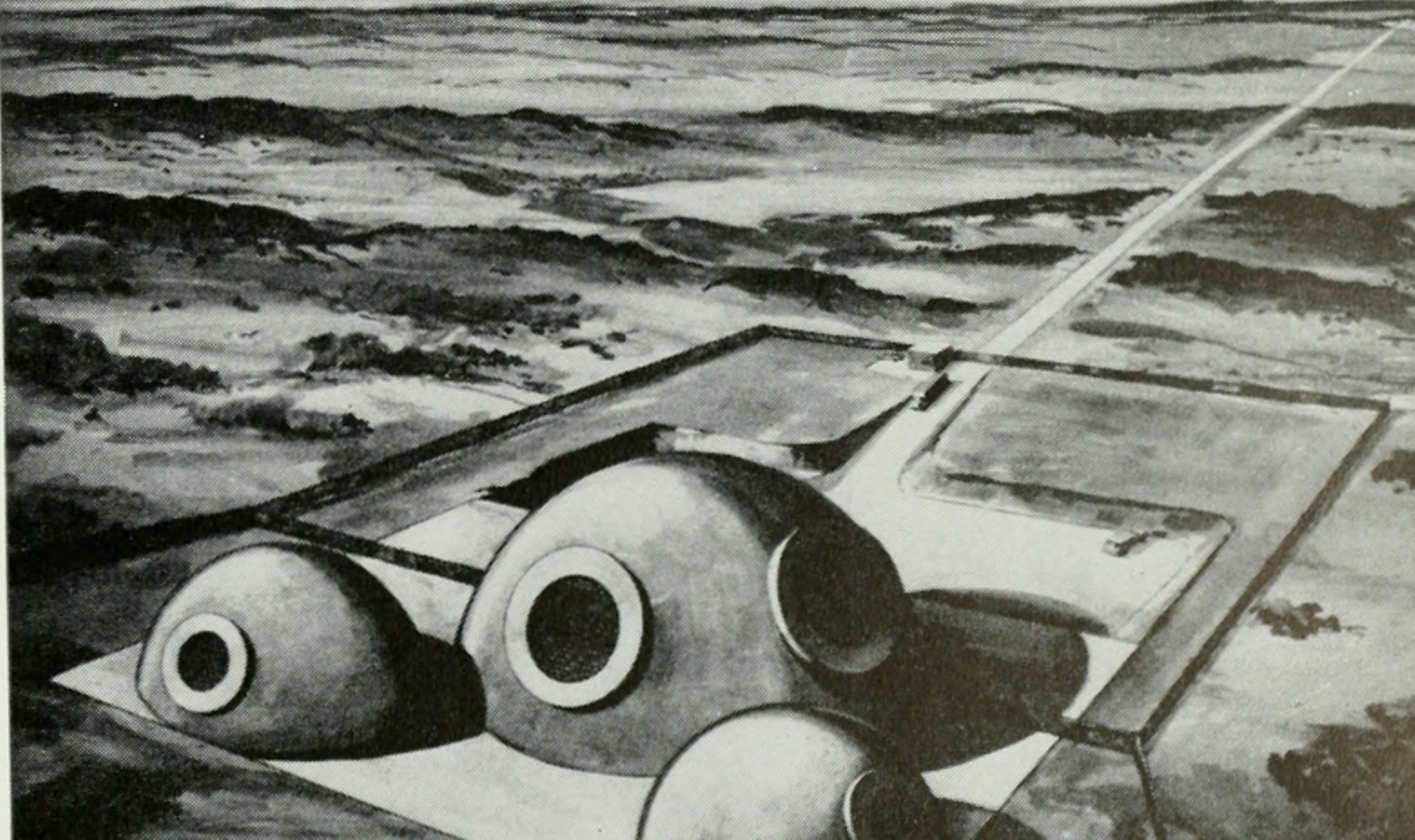
ZMAR concept sketch, 1962

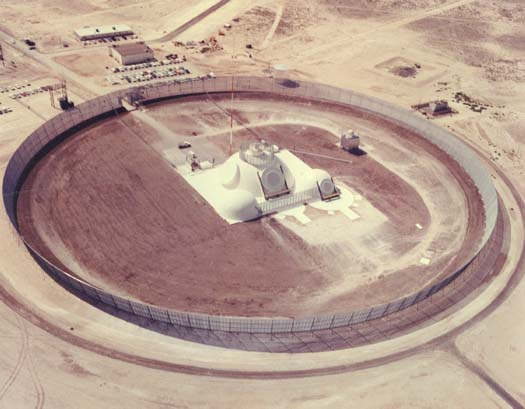
An aerial view of the three domes of the Multifunction Array Radar prototype, surrounded by a clutter fence, at White Sands Missile Range, N.M.

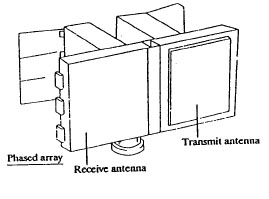
Sketch of the FLAT TWIN antiballistic missile radar

Bell Labs proposed replacing the Nike Zeus radars with a phased-array system in 1960, and was given the go-ahead for development in June 1961. The result was the Zeus Multi-function Array Radar (ZMAR), an early example of an active electronically steered array radar system. ZMAR became MAR when the Zeus program ended in favor of the Nike-X system in 1963. The MAR (Multi-function Array Radar) was made of a large number of small antennas, each one connected to a separate computer-controlled transmitter or receiver. Using a variety of beamforming and signal processing steps, a single MAR was able to perform long-distance detection, track generation, discrimination of warheads from decoys, and tracking of the outbound interceptor missiles.

MAR allowed the entire battle over a wide space to be controlled from a single site. Each MAR, and its associated battle center, would process tracks for hundreds of targets. The system would then select the most appropriate battery for each one, and hand off particular targets for them to attack. One battery would normally be associated with the MAR, while others would be distributed around it. Remote batteries were equipped with a much simpler radar whose primary purpose was to track the outgoing Sprint missiles before they became visible to the potentially distant MAR. These smaller Missile Site Radars (MSR) were passively scanned, forming only a single beam instead of the MAR's multiple beams.

While MAR was ultimately successful, the cost of the system was enormous. When the ABM problem became so complex that even a system like MAR could no longer deal with realistic attack scenarios, the Nike-X concept was abandoned in favor of much simpler concepts like the Sentinel program, which did not use MAR. A second example, MAR-II, was abandoned in-place on Kwajalein Atoll.

The first Soviet APAR, the 5N65, was developed in 1963–1965 as a part of the S-225 ABM system. After some modifications in the system concept in 1967 it was built at Sary Shagan Test Range in 1970–1971 and nicknamed Flat Twin in the West. Four years later another radar of this design was built on Kura Test Range, while the S-225 system was never commissioned.

- The first military ground-based AESA was the J/FPS-3 which became fully operational with the 45th Aircraft Control and Warning Group of the Japan Self-Defense Forces in 1995.
- The first series production ship-based AESA was the OPS-24, a fire-control radar introduced on the Japanese Asagiri-class destroyer DD-155 Hamagiri launched in 1988.
- The first airborne series production AESA was the EL/M-2075 Phalcon on a Boeing 707 of the Chilean Air Force that entered service in 1994.
- The first AESA on a combat aircraft was the J/APG-1 introduced on the Mitsubishi F-2 in 1995.
- The first AESA on a missile is the seeker head for the AAM-4B, an air-to-air missile carried by the Mitsubishi F-2 and Mitsubishi-built McDonnell-Douglas F-15J.

US based manufacturers of the AESA radars used in the F-22 and Super Hornet include Northrop Grumman and Raytheon. These companies also design, develop and manufacture the transmit/receive modules which comprise the 'building blocks' of an AESA radar. The requisite electronics technology was developed in-house via Department of Defense research programs such as MMIC Program. In 2016 the Congress funded a military industry competition to produce new radars for two dozen National Guard fighter aircraft.

== Basic concept ==
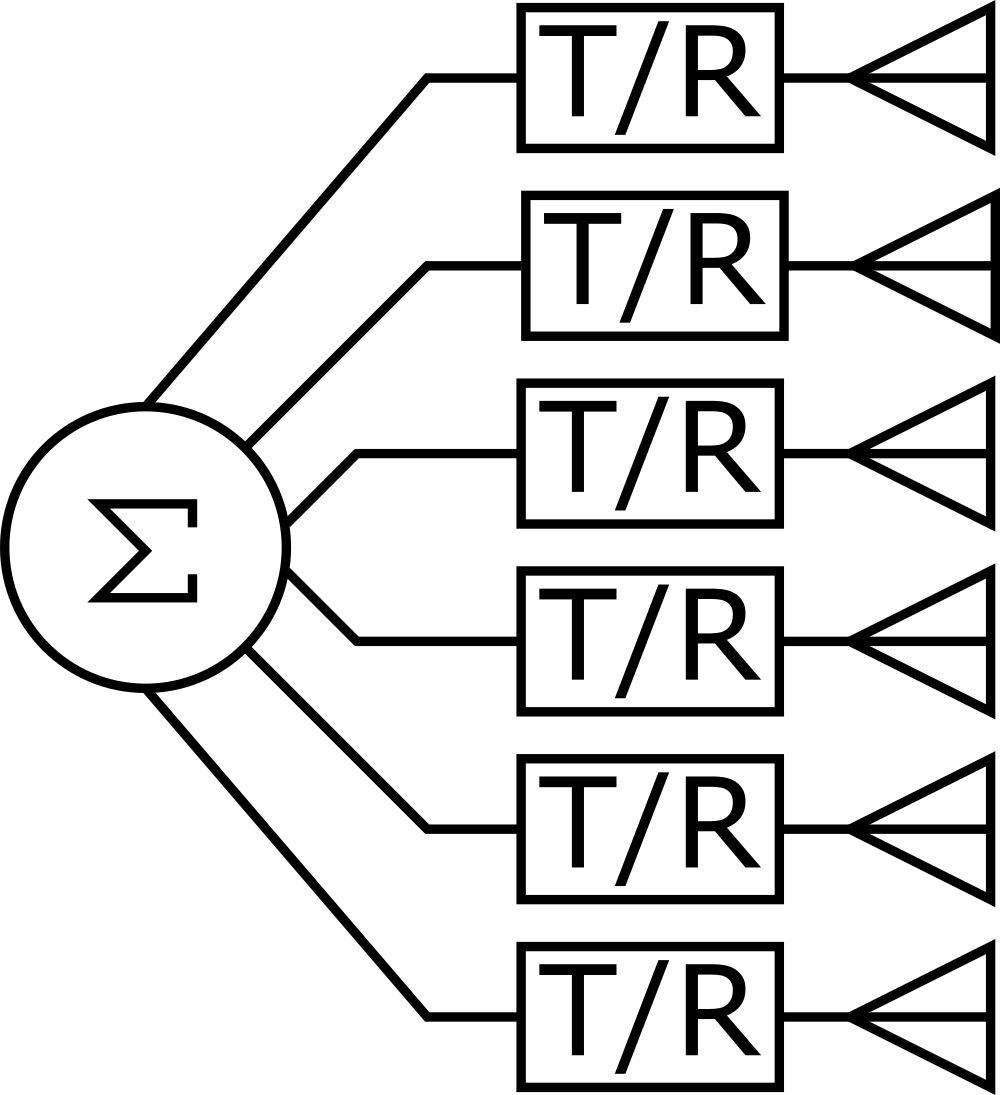
AESA basic schematic

Radar systems generally work by connecting an antenna to a powerful radio transmitter to emit a short pulse of signal. The transmitter is then disconnected and the antenna is connected to a sensitive receiver which amplifies any echos from target objects. By measuring the time it takes for the signal to return, the radar receiver can determine the distance to the object. The receiver then sends the resulting output to a display of some sort. The transmitter elements were typically klystron tubes or magnetrons, which are suitable for amplifying or generating a narrow range of frequencies to high power levels. To scan a portion of the sky, the radar antenna must be physically moved to point in different directions.

Starting in the 1960s new solid-state devices capable of delaying the transmitter signal in a controlled way were introduced. That led to the first practical large-scale passive electronically scanned array (PESA), or simply phased-array radar. PESAs took a signal from a single source, split it into hundreds of paths, selectively delayed some of them, and sent them to individual antennas. The radio signals from the separate antennas overlapped in space, and the interference patterns between the individual signals were controlled to reinforce the signal in certain directions, and mute it in all others. The delays could be easily controlled electronically, allowing the beam to be steered very quickly without moving the antenna. A PESA can scan a volume of space much quicker than a traditional mechanical system. Additionally, thanks to progress in electronics, PESAs added the ability to produce several active beams, allowing them to continue scanning the sky while at the same time focusing smaller beams on certain targets for tracking or guiding semi-active radar homing missiles. PESAs quickly became widespread on ships and large fixed emplacements in the 1960s, followed by airborne sensors as the electronics shrank.

AESAs are the result of further developments in solid-state electronics. In earlier systems the transmitted signal was originally created in a klystron or traveling wave tube or similar device, which are relatively large. Receiver electronics were also large due to the high frequencies that they worked with. The introduction of gallium arsenide microelectronics through the 1980s served to greatly reduce the size of the receiver elements until effective ones could be built at sizes similar to those of handheld radios, only a few cubic centimeters in volume. The introduction of JFETs and MESFETs did the same to the transmitter side of the systems as well. It gave rise to amplifier-transmitters with a low-power solid-state waveform generator feeding an amplifier, allowing any radar so equipped to transmit on a much wider range of frequencies, to the point of changing operating frequency with every pulse sent out. Shrinking the entire assembly (the transmitter, receiver and antenna) into a single "transmitter-receiver module" (TRM) about the size of a carton of milk and arraying these elements produces an AESA.

The primary advantage of an AESA over a PESA is the capability of the different modules to operate on different frequencies. Unlike the PESA, where the signal is generated at single frequencies by a small number of transmitters, in the AESA each module generates and radiates its own independent signal. This allows the AESA to produce numerous simultaneous "sub-beams" that it can recognize due to different frequencies, and actively track a much larger number of targets. AESAs can also produce beams that consist of many different frequencies at once, using post-processing of the combined signal from a number of TRMs to re-create a display as if there was a single powerful beam being sent. However, this means that the noise present in each frequency is also received and added.

== Advantages ==
AESAs add many capabilities of their own to those of the PESAs. Among these are: the ability to form multiple beams simultaneously, to use groups of TRMs for different roles concurrently, like radar detection, and, more importantly, their multiple simultaneous beams and scanning frequencies create difficulties for traditional, correlation-type radar detectors.

=== Low probability of intercept ===
Radar systems work by sending out a signal and then listening for its echo off distant objects. Each of these paths, to and from the target, is subject to the inverse square law of propagation in both the transmitted signal and the signal reflected back. That means that a radar's received energy drops with the fourth power of the distance, which is why radar systems require high powers, often in the megawatt range, to be effective at long range.

The radar signal being sent out is a simple radio signal, and can be received with a simple radio receiver. Military aircraft and ships have defensive receivers, called "radar warning receivers" (RWR), which detect when an enemy radar beam is on them, thus revealing the position of the enemy. Unlike the radar unit, which must send the pulse out and then receive its reflection, the target's receiver does not need the reflection and thus the signal drops off only as the square of distance. This means that the receiver is always at an advantage [neglecting disparity in antenna size] over the radar in terms of range – it will always be able to detect the signal long before the radar can see the target's echo. Since the position of the radar is extremely useful information in an attack on that platform, this means that radars generally must be turned off for lengthy periods if they are subject to attack; this is common on ships, for instance.

Unlike the radar, which knows which direction it is sending its signal, the receiver simply gets a pulse of energy and has to interpret it. Since the radio spectrum is filled with noise, the receiver's signal is integrated over a short period of time, making periodic sources like a radar add up and stand out over the random background. The rough direction can be calculated using a rotating antenna, or similar passive array using phase or amplitude comparison. Typically RWRs store the detected pulses for a short period of time, and compare their broadcast frequency and pulse repetition frequency against a database of known radars. The direction to the source is normally combined with symbology indicating the likely purpose of the radar – airborne early warning and control, surface-to-air missile, etc.

This technique is much less useful against a radar with a frequency-agile (solid state) transmitter. Since the AESA (or PESA) can change its frequency with every pulse (except when using doppler filtering), and generally does so using a random sequence, integrating over time does not help pull the signal out of the background noise. Moreover, a radar may be designed to extend the duration of the pulse and lower its peak power. An AESA or modern PESA will often have the capability to alter these parameters during operation. This makes no difference to the total energy reflected by the target but makes the detection of the pulse by an RWR system less likely. Nor does the AESA have any sort of fixed pulse repetition frequency, which can also be varied and thus hide any periodic brightening across the entire spectrum. Older generation RWRs are essentially useless against AESA radars, which is why AESAs are also known as low probability of intercept radars. Modern RWRs must be made highly sensitive (small angles and bandwidths for individual antennas, low transmission loss and noise) and add successive pulses through time-frequency processing to achieve useful detection rates.

=== High jamming resistance ===
Jamming is likewise much more difficult against an AESA. Traditionally, jammers have operated by determining the operating frequency of the radar and then broadcasting a signal on it to confuse the receiver as to which is the "real" pulse and which is the jammer's. This technique works as long as the radar system cannot easily change its operating frequency. When the transmitters were based on klystron tubes this was generally true, and radars, especially airborne ones, had only a few frequencies to choose among. A jammer could listen to those possible frequencies and select the one to be used to jam.

Most radars using modern electronics are capable of changing their operating frequency with every pulse. This can make jamming less effective; although it is possible to send out broadband white noise to conduct barrage jamming against all the possible frequencies, this reduces the amount of jammer energy in any one frequency. An AESA has the additional capability of emitting a single broad-spectrum pulse, called a chirp, which is more difficult to jam.

AESAs can also be switched to a receive-only mode, and use these powerful jamming signals to track its source, something that required a separate receiver in older platforms. By integrating received signals from the targets' own radar along with a lower rate of data from its own broadcasts, a detection system with a precise RWR like an AESA can generate more data with less energy. Some receive beamforming-capable systems, usually ground-based, may even discard a transmitter entirely.

However, using a single receiving antenna only gives a direction. Obtaining a range and a target vector requires at least two physically separate passive devices for triangulation to provide instantaneous determinations, unless phase interferometry is used. Target motion analysis can estimate these quantities by incorporating many directional measurements over time, along with knowledge of the position of the receiver and constraints on the possible motion of the target.

=== Other advantages ===
Since each element in an AESA is a powerful radio receiver, active arrays have many roles besides traditional radar. One use is to dedicate several of the elements to reception of common radar signals, eliminating the need for a separate radar warning receiver. The same basic concept can be used to provide traditional radio support, and with some elements also broadcasting, form a very high bandwidth data link. The F-35 uses this mechanism to send sensor data between aircraft in order to provide a synthetic picture of higher resolution and range than any one radar could generate. In 2007, tests by Northrop Grumman, Lockheed Martin, and L-3 Communications enabled the AESA system of a Raptor to act like a WiFi access point, able to transmit data at 548 megabits per second and receive at gigabit speed; this is far faster than the Link 16 system used by US and allied aircraft, which transfers data at just over 1 Mbit/s. To achieve these high data rates requires a highly directional antenna which AESA provides but which precludes reception by other units not within the antennas beamwidth, whereas like most Wi-Fi designs, Link-16 transmits its signal omni-directionally to ensure all units within range can receive the data.

AESAs are also much more reliable than either PESAs or older designs. Since each module operates independently of the others, single failures have little effect on the operation of the system as a whole. Additionally, the modules individually operate at low powers, perhaps 40 to 60 watts, so the need for a large high-voltage power supply is eliminated.

Replacing a mechanically scanned array with a fixed AESA mount (such as on the Boeing F/A-18E/F Super Hornet) can help reduce an aircraft's overall radar cross-section (RCS), but some designs (such as the Eurofighter Typhoon and Gripen NG) forgo this advantage in order to combine mechanical scanning with electronic scanning and provide a wider angle of total coverage. This high off-nose pointing allows the AESA equipped fighter to employ a crossing the T maneuver, often referred to as "beaming" or "notching", against a mechanically scanned radar that would filter out the low closing speed of the perpendicular flight as ground clutter while the AESA swivels 40 degrees towards the target in order to keep it within the AESA's 60 degree off-angle limit.

== Limitations ==
With a half wavelength distance between the elements, the maximum beam angle is approximately $\pm 45$°. With a shorter element distance, the highest field of view (FOV) for a flat phased-array antenna is currently 120° ($\pm 60$°), although this can be combined with mechanical steering as noted above.

== List of existing systems ==
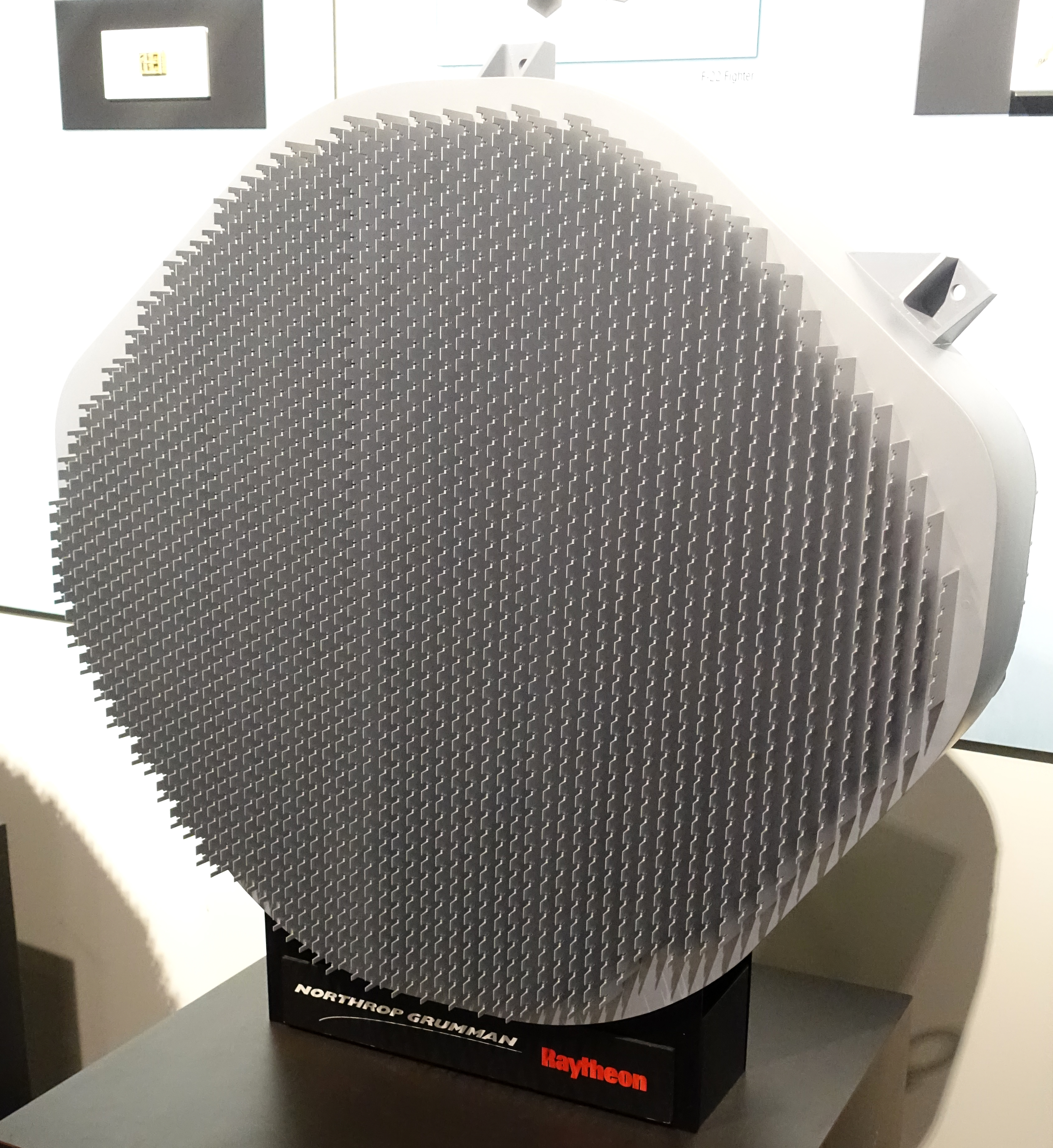
F-22 Raptor's AN/APG-77 AESA radar

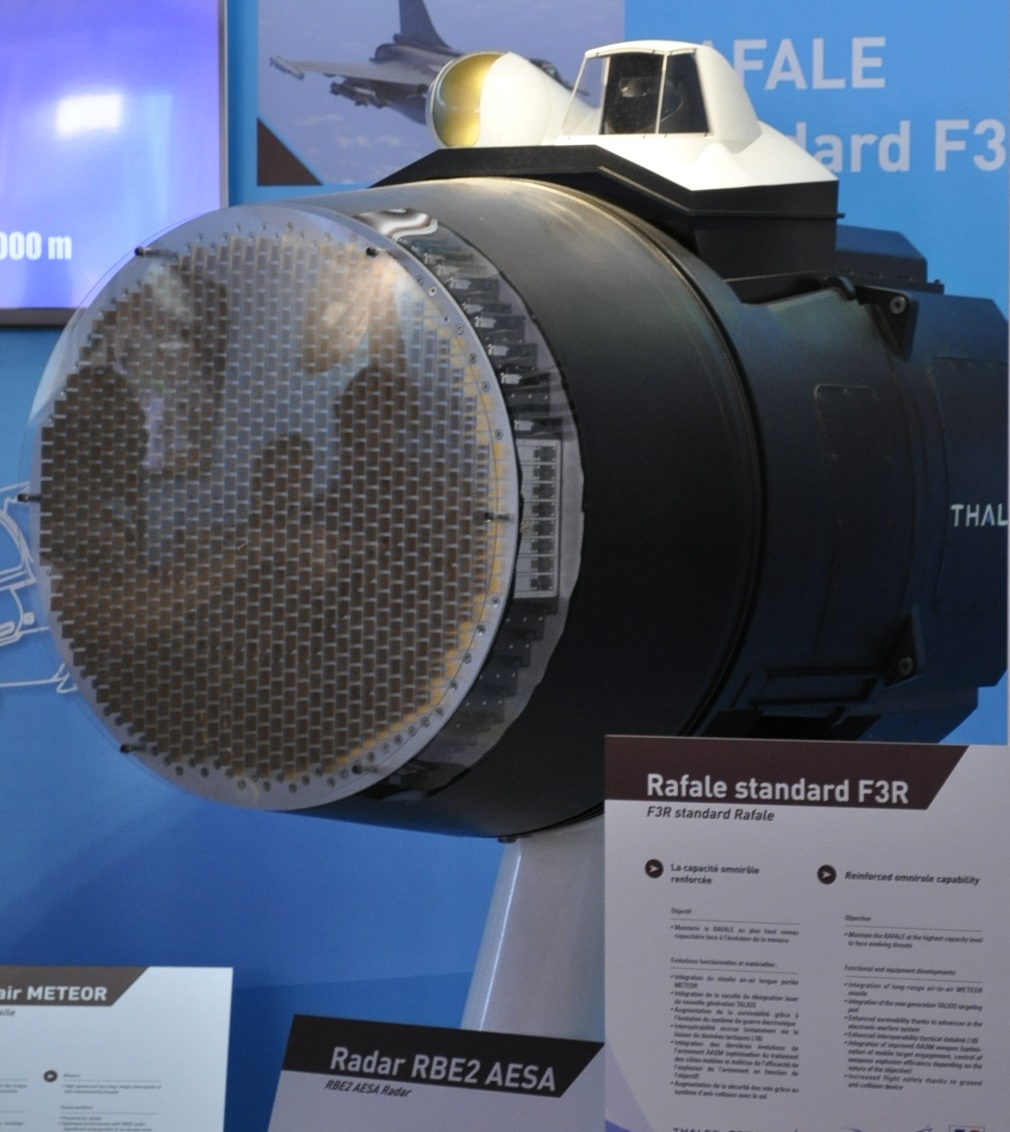
Close up of the Thales RBE2-AA mounted on Rafale since F3R standard. (The OSF behind it is not part of the radar.)

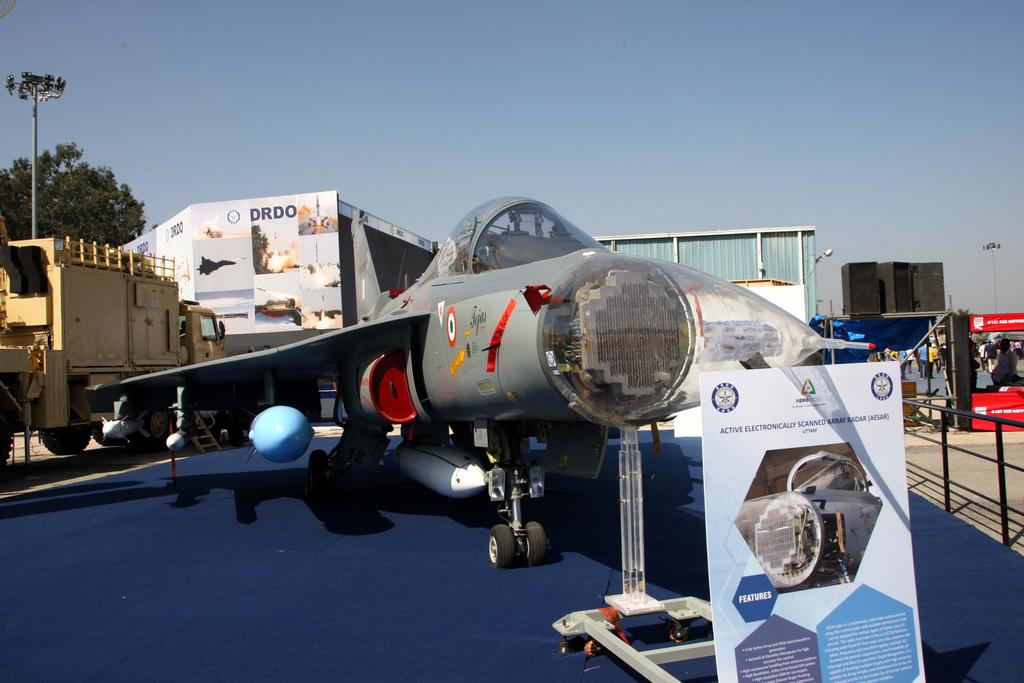
The HAL Tejas combat aircraft equipped with Uttam AESA radar

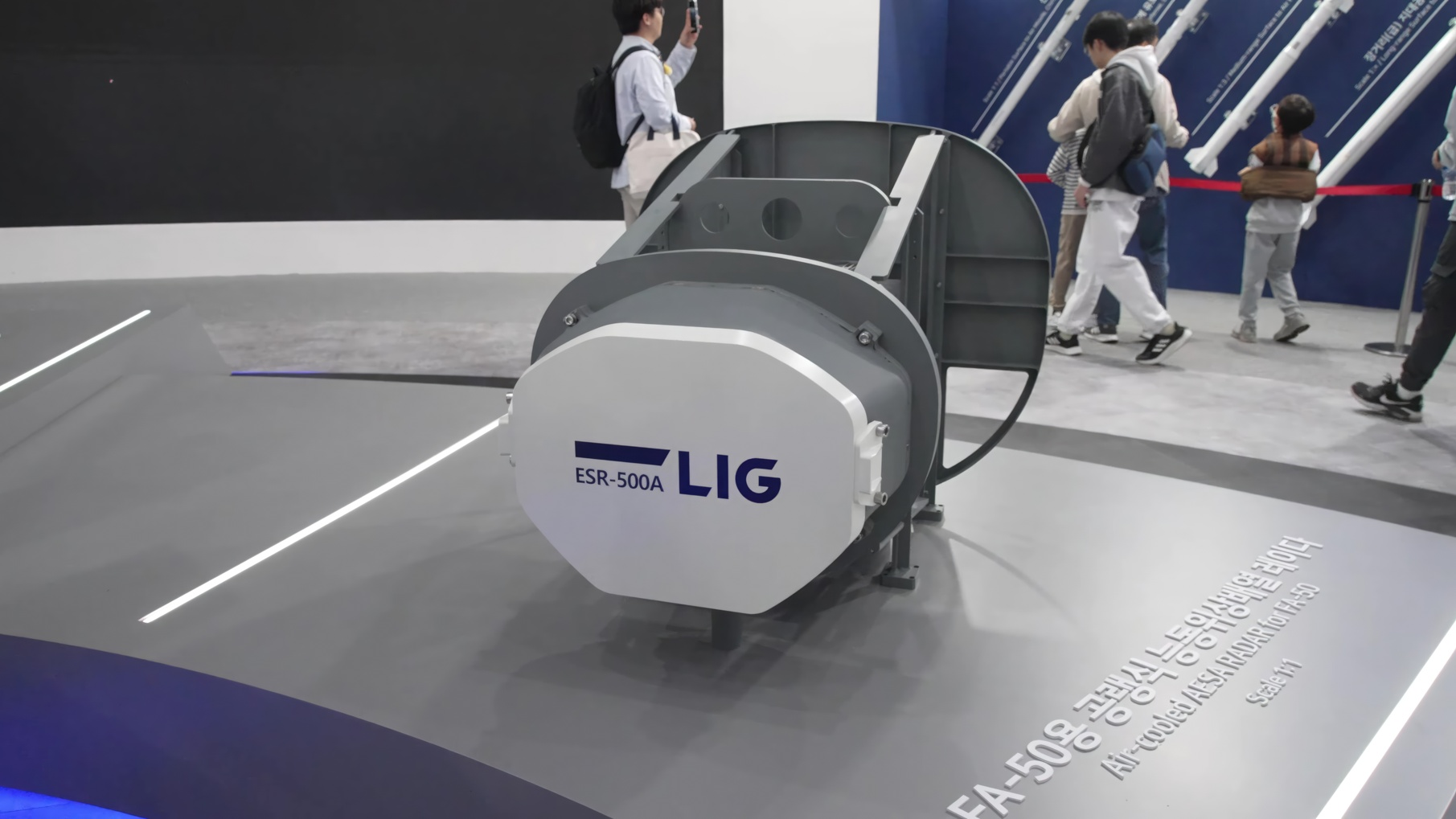
LIG Nex1 ESR-500A AESA radar

=== Airborne systems ===
- Aselsan
  - MURAD, for the Baykar Bayraktar Akıncı, F-16 and TAI TF-X Kaan.
  - FULMAR, for the maritime aircraft and helicopters.
- Captor-E CAESAR (CAPTOR Active Electronically Scanning Array Radar) for the Eurofighter Typhoon
- Defence Research and Development Organisation
  - DRDO LSTAR – Radar for Airborne Early-Warning platform
  - Uttam AESA – Gallium Arsenide (GaAs) based multifunction radar for India's combat aircraft HAL Tejas
  - Virupaaksha – an advanced variant of Uttam AESA radar based on Gallium Nitride (GaN). To be used in air superiority fighter Su-30MKI
- Elta Systems
  - EL/M-2083 aerostat-mounted air search radar
  - EL/M-2052, for fighters. Interim candidate for HAL Tejas. Suitable for F-15, MiG-29, Mirage 2000, FA-50 Block 20.
  - EL/M-2075 radar for the IAI Phalcon AEW&C system
  - EL/W-2085 advanced version of the radar for the EL/M-2075, used on the Gulfstream G550
  - EL/W-2090 similar to the EL/W-2085, only used on the Ilyushin Il-76
- Ericsson
  - Erieye AEW&C
  - PS-05/A MK-5 for JAS 39 Gripen.
  - EMB 145 AEW&C
- Hanwha Systems
  - APY-016K for KAI KF-21 Boramae
- LIG Nex1
  - ESR-500A air-cooled radar, roughly equivalent to Raytheon PhamtomStrike, option for KAI FA-50 Block 20
- Mitsubishi Electric Corporation
  - J/APG-1 / J/APG-2 AESA for the Mitsubishi F-2 fighter
  - HPS-104 for the Mitsubishi SH-60
  - Multifunction RF Sensor for Mitsubishi ATD-X
- Northrop Grumman
  - AN/APG-77, for the F-22 Raptor
  - AN/APG-80, for the General Dynamics F-16 Fighting Falcon
  - AN/APG-81, for the F-35 Lightning II
  - AN/APG-83, for the F-16V Viper and Rockwell B-1B Lancer upgrades.
  - AN/APG-85, for the F-35 Lightning II (Block 4)
  - AN/APY-9, for the E-2D Advanced Hawkeye
  - Multi-role Electronically Scanned Array (MESA), for the Boeing E-7 Wedgetail
  - AN/ASQ-236 Podded AESA Radar
  - AN/ZPY-1 STARLite Small Tactical Radar – Lightweight, for crewed and uncrewed aircraft
  - AN/ZPY-2 Multi-Platform Radar Technology Insertion Program (MP-RTIP)
  - AN/ZPY-3 Multi-Function Active Sensor (MFAS) for MQ-4C Triton
- NRIET (Nanjing Research Institute of Electronics Technology/14 institute), 607 institute, and 38 institute
  - Radar for KJ-2000 AEW&C system
  - Radar for KJ-500 & Y-7 AWACS
  - Radar for KJ-200
  - KLJ-7A for JF-17 Thunder Block 3
  - ZDK-03
  - Type 1475 Radar for Chengdu J-20
  - Chengdu J-10B/C
  - Shenyang J-16
  - Z-8AEW
  - Vehicle Dismount and Exploitation Radar (VADER)
- Phazotron NIIR
  - Zhuk-A/AM, optional for MiG-35
- Raytheon
  - AN/APG-63(V)2 and AN/APG-63(V)3, for the F-15C Eagle, Republic of Singapore's F-15SG
  - AN/APG-79, for the F/A-18E/F Super Hornet and EA-18G Growler
  - AN/APG-82(V)1 for the F-15E Strike Eagle & F-15EX Eagle II
  - AN/APG-84 RACR (Raytheon Advanced Combat Radar) for F-16 and F/A-18 upgrades.
  - AN/APQ-181 upgrade from PESA to AESA, for Northrop Grumman B-2 Spirit bomber
  - AN/APS-154 AAS (Advanced Airborne Sensor), AESA follow-on to LSRS (Littoral Surveillance Radar System), AN/APS-149. Also for the Boeing P-8 Poseidon
  - PhantomStrike air-cooled AESA radar for the FA-50 Block 20.
  - Raytheon Sentinel ASTOR (Airborne STand-Off Radar)
- Saab
  - GlobalEye AEW&C, advanced version of the Erieye with extended range.
- Selex ES (now Leonardo)
  - PicoSAR
  - Raven ES-05 AESA for the JAS-39E Gripen NG
  - Seaspray 5000E
  - Seaspray 7000E, for helicopters
  - Seaspray 7500E for General Atomics MQ-9 Reaper
  - Vixen 500E
  - Vixen 1000E
- Tikhomirov NIIP
  - N036 Byelka, for Sukhoi Su-57
- Thales
  - RBE2-AA for Rafale fighter
- Toshiba
  - HPS-106, air & surface search radar, for the Kawasaki P-1 maritime patrol aircraft, three antenna arrays.
- Vega Radio Engineering Corporation -
  - radar for Beriev A-100

=== Surface systems (land, maritime) ===
The first AESA radar employed on an operational warship was the Japanese OPS-24 manufactured by Mitsubishi Electric introduced on the JDS Hamagiri (DD-155), the first ship of the latter batch of the Asagiri-class destroyer, launched in 1988.

- APAR (active phased-array radar): Thales Netherlands' multifunction radar is the primary sensor of the Royal Netherlands Navy's De Zeven Provinciën-class frigates, the German Navy's Sachsen-class frigates, and the Royal Danish Navy's Ivar Huitfeldt-class frigates. APAR is the first active electronically scanned array multifunction radar employed on an operational warship.
- Aselsan
  - AKREP, for marine platforms
  - CENK, for marine platforms
  - ALP 100-G mobile multifunction Air Surveillance Radar
  - ALP 300-G mobile long range early warning radar
- BAE Systems
  - SAMPSON multifunction radar for the UK's Type 45 destroyers
  - ARTISAN Type 997 multifunction radar for the UK's Type 23 and Type 26 Frigates and the Queen Elizabeth class aircraft carriers
- Bharat Electronics
  - RAWL-03 – Multi-Function Active phased-array Air Surveillance Radar.
  - Naval Missile Defense Radar (NMDR) – S-Band Multi-Function Active phased-array Radar.
- Cassidian
  - BÜR – Bodenüberwachungsradar by Cassidian, for the Bundeswehr
  - COBRA Counter-battery radar
- CEA Technologies
  - CEAFAR a 4th generation, S-Band multifunction digital active phased-array radar, installed on all of the Royal Australian Navy's Anzac class frigates, HMAS Choules, and the future Hunter-class frigates.
- China
  - Road-mobile "Anti-Stealth" JY-26 "Skywatch-U" 3-D long-range air surveillance radar.
  - H/LJG-346(8) on Chinese aircraft carrier Liaoning
  - H/LJG-346 on Type 052C destroyer
  - H/LJG-346A on Type 052D destroyer
  - H/LJG-346B on Type 055 destroyer
  - Type 305A Radar (Acquisition radar for the HQ-9 missile system)
  - YLC-2 Radar
- Defence Research and Development Organisation (DRDO)
  - Ashwini LLTR Radar – 4D AESA radar (used by Indian Air Force).
  - Arudhra Radar – Multi function AESA radar (used by Indian Air Force).
  - Swordfish Long Range Tracking Radar– Target acquisition and fire control radar for Indian Ballistic Missile Defence system.
  - Air Defence Tactical Control Radar (ADTCR) – Tactical control radar.
  - Atulya Air Defence Fire Control Radar (ADFCR) – X-band, 3D Fire control radar.

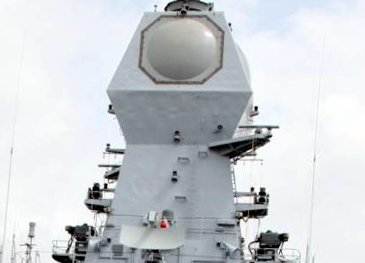
EL/M-2248 MF-STAR on board a Kolkata-class destroyer

- Elta
  - EL/M-2080 Green Pine ground-based early-warning AESA radar
  - EL/M-2106 ATAR air defense fire control radar
  - EL/M-2180 – WatchR Guard Multi-Mode Staring Ground Surveillance Radar
  - EL/M-2248 MF-STAR multifunction naval radar
  - EL/M-2258 Advanced Lightweight Phased-Array ALPHA multifunction naval radar
  - EL/M-2084 multimission radar (artillery weapon location, air defence and fire control)
  - EL/M-2133 WindGuard – Trophy active protection system radar
- Hensoldt
  - TRML-4D
  - TRS-4D
- Larsen & Toubro
  - Air Defence Fire Control Radar System – 3D surveillance radar.
- LIG Nex1
  - SPS-550K medium-range air and surface surveillance radar for Incheon-class frigates and Daegu-class frigates
- Lockheed Martin
  - AN/TPQ-53 Counterfire Target Acquisition Radar
  - AN/SPY-7 Long Range Discrimination Radar
  - AN/MPQ-64A4 Sentinel
  - AN/TPY-4 3DELRR Three-Dimensional Expeditionary Long-Range Radar

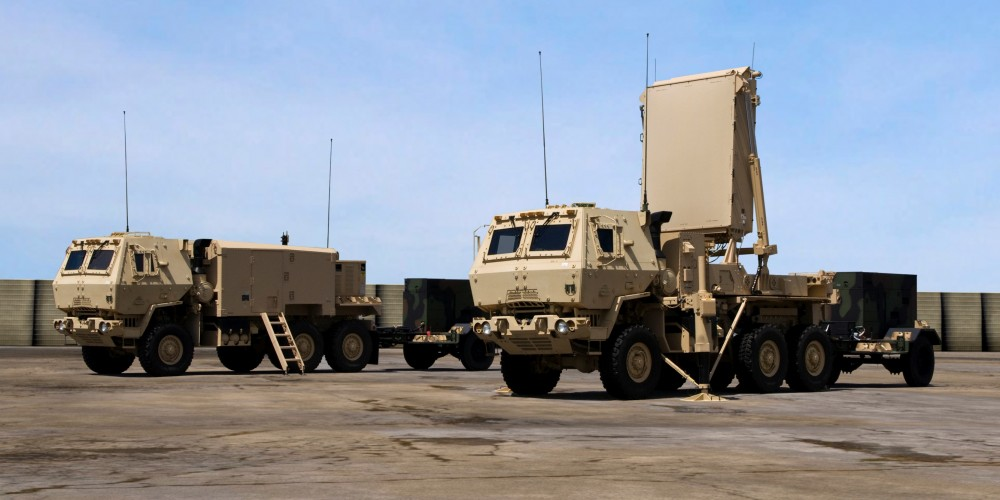
AN/TPQ-53 phased-array radar

- MEADS's fire control radar
- Mitsubishi Electric Corporation
  - Type 3 Chū-SAM Medium Range Surface-to-Air MissileSystem (Chu-SAM, SAM-4) multifunction radar
  - OPS-24 (The world's first Naval Active Electronically Scanned Array radar) on Asagiri-class destroyers, Murasame-class destroyer (1994) and Takanami-class destroyers
  - OPS-50 (FCS-3) on the Hyūga-class helicopter destroyer, Izumo-class helicopter destroyer and Akizuki-class destroyer (2010)
  - J/FPS-3 Japanese main ground-based air defense
  - J/FPS-5 Japanese ground-based next-generation missile defense radar
  - JTPS-P14 Transportable air defence radar
  - JTPS-P16 Counter-battery radar
- National Chung-Shan Institute of Science and Technology
  - Sea eagle eye – Multi function AESA radar
- National Radio & Telecommunication Corporation
  - AM-350S Pakistani ground-based early warning radar
- NEC
  - J/TPS-102 Self-propelled ground-based radar, cylindrical array antenna.
- NNIIRT 1L119 Nebo SVU mobile AESA 3-dimensional surveillance radar
- Northrop Grumman
  - AN/TPS-80 Ground/air task-oriented radar (G/ATOR)
  - HAMMR Highly Adaptable Multi-Mission Radar
- PIT-RADWAR
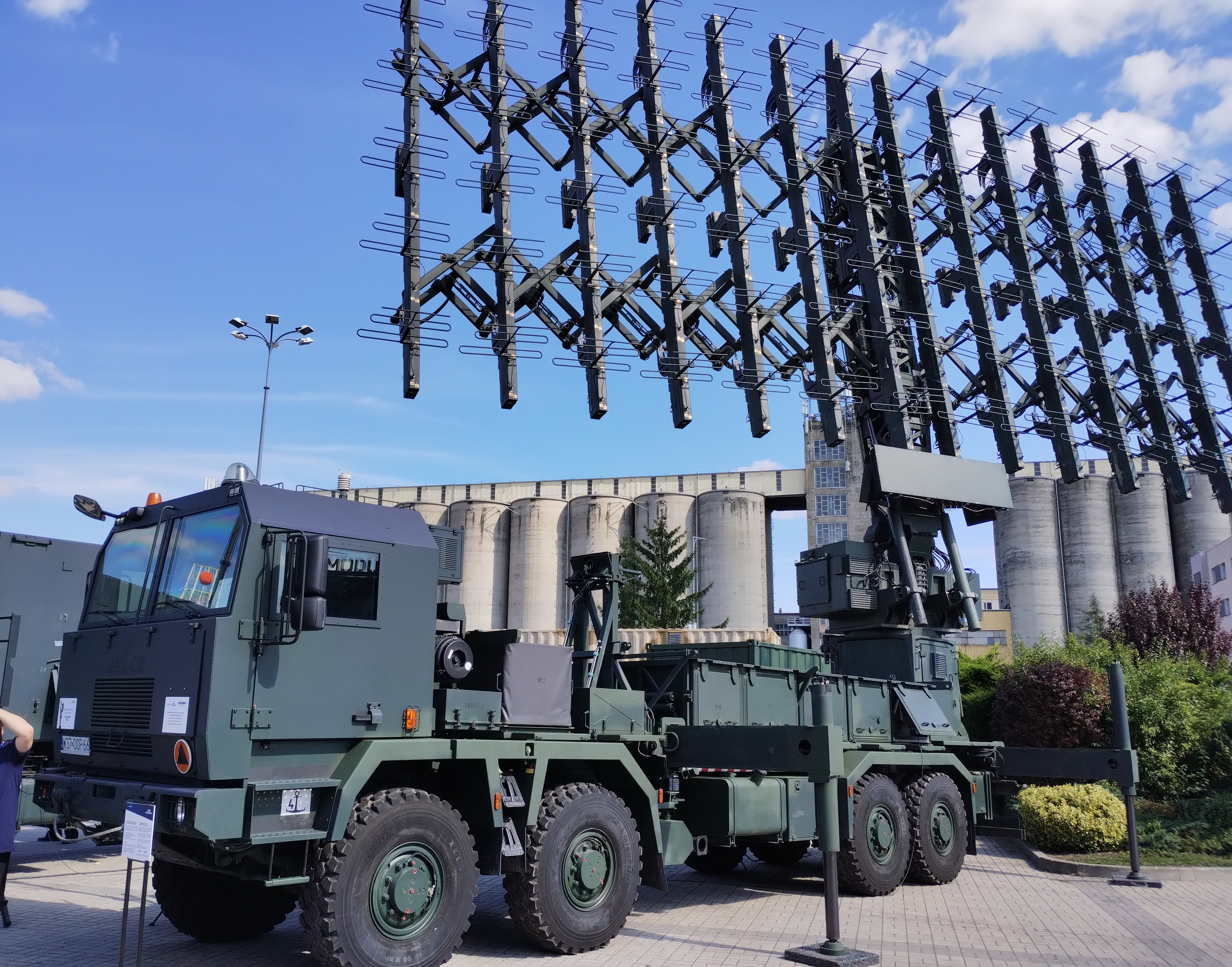
  Polish P-18PL VHF AESA early-warning radar prototype at MSPO 2023
  - ZDPSR Bystra – C-band AESA multifunction three-dimensional radar for SHORAD and VSHORAD systems.
  - P-18PL – VHF AESA mobile long-range three-dimensional early-warning radar.
  - SAJNA – C-band AESA multifunction fire-control radar being developed for the Narew short-range air-defense system.
  - TUGA – X-band 4D AESA frequency-modulated continuous-wave radar being developed for VSHORAD and counter-UAS systems.
  - WARTA – L-band AESA mobile long-range three-dimensional air-surveillance radar.
- RADA Electronic Industries
  - RPS-10
  - RPS-15
  - RPS-40
  - RPS-42
  - RHS-44

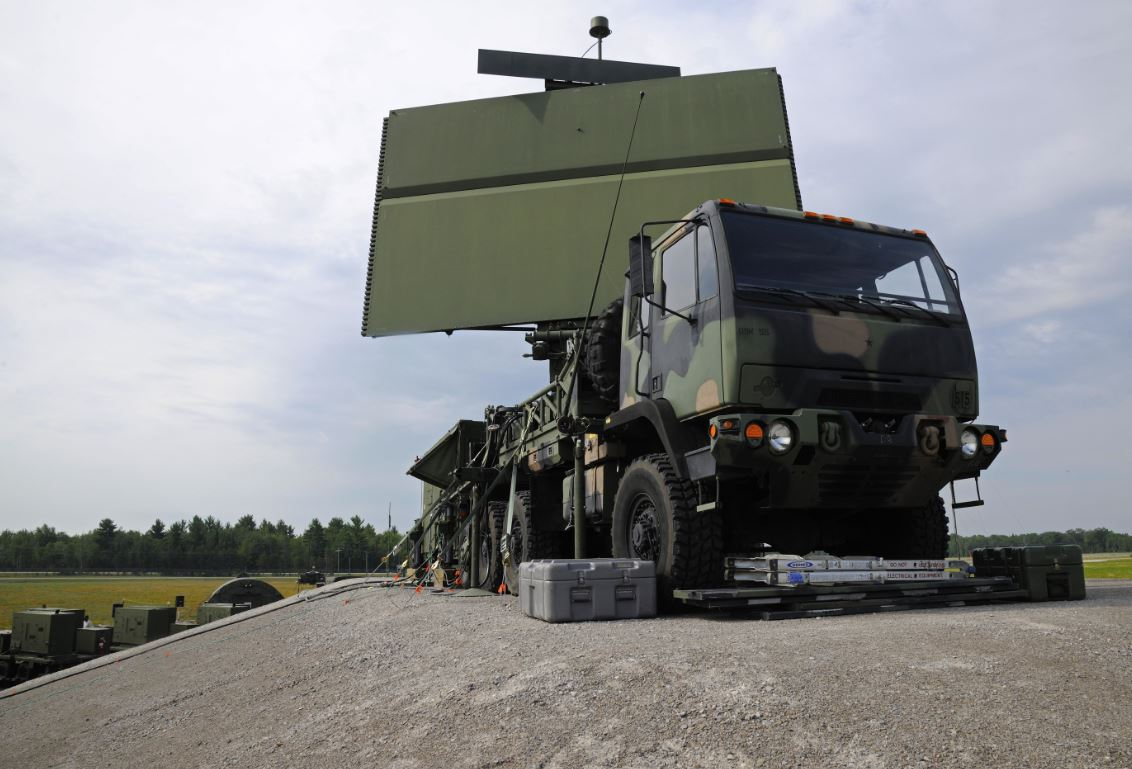
3DELRR long-range radar system

- Raytheon
  - FlexDAR Flexible Distributed Array Radar
  - U.S. National Missile defense Sea-based X-band radar (XBR)
  - AN/TPY-2 Anti-Ballistic Missile radar that can stand alone or be a part of the THAAD ABM system
  - AN/SPY-3 multifunction radar for U.S. DD(X) and CVN-21 next-generation surface vessels
  - AN/SPY-6 Air and Missile Defense Radar (AMDR) multifunction radar for U.S. Arleigh Burke destroyers, Gerald R. Ford-class aircraft carrier
  - Cobra Judy Replacement (CJR)/Cobra King on USNS Howard O. Lorenzen (T-AGM-25)
  - AN/FPS-132 Upgraded Early Warning Radar (UEWR) – PAVE PAWS upgrade from PESA to AESA
  - KuRFS
- Saab Group
  - GIRAFFE Radar: GIRAFFE 1X, GIRAFFE 4A, GIRAFFE 8A
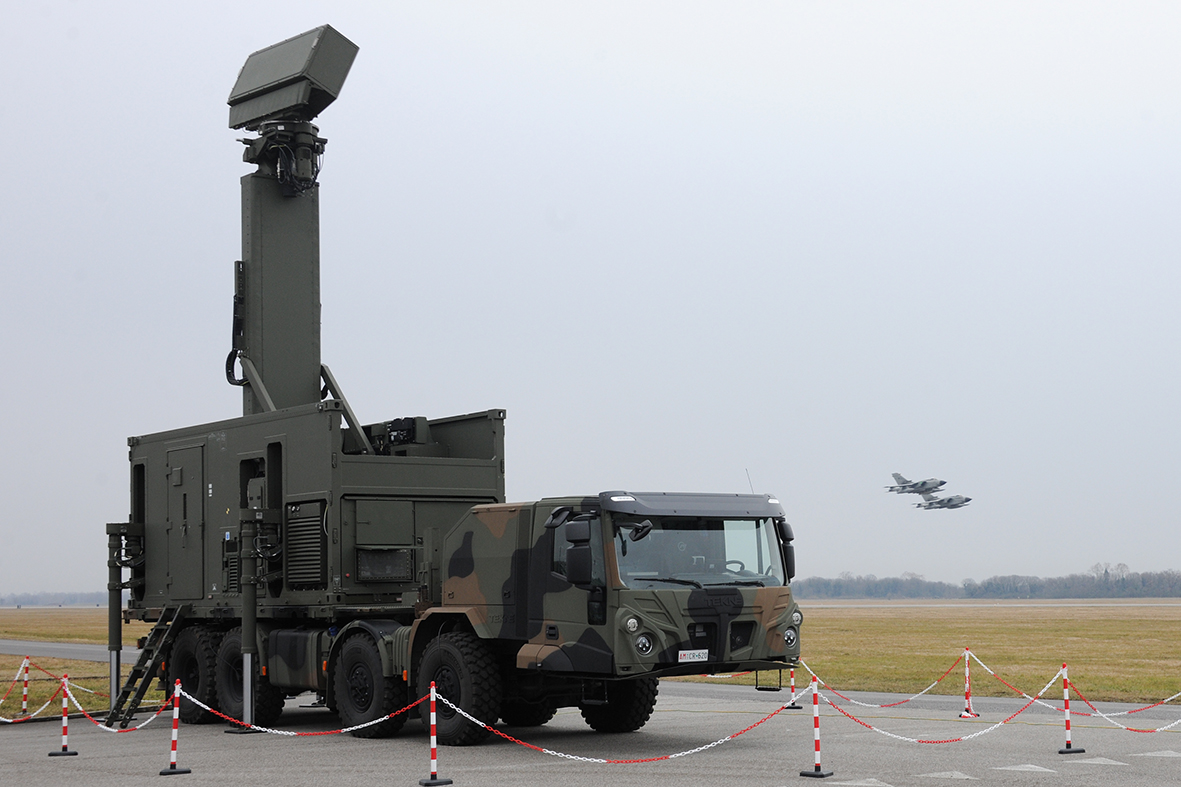
- Leonardo KRONOS AESA Italian Air Force Medium Advanced Air Defence System
  Selex ES
  - KRONOS Land & Naval 3D multi-function radar
  - RAN-40L 3D EWR
  - RAT-31DL
  - RAT-31DL/M
- Thales
  - Ground Master 200 MM
  - SMART-L MM
  - Sea Fire 500 on FREMM-ER frigates
  - Sea Watcher 100

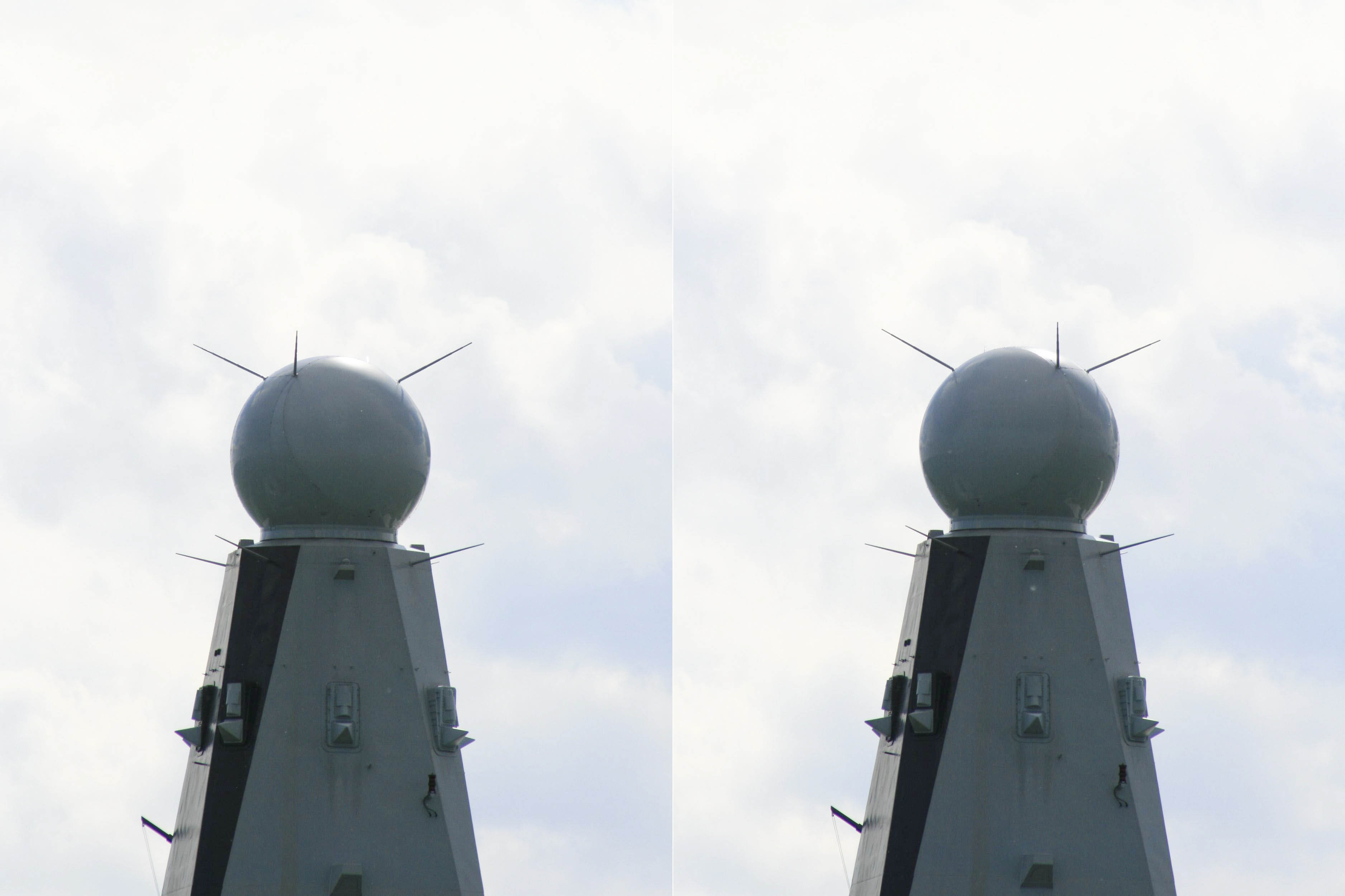
SAMPSON AESA on board the Type 45 destroyer

- ThalesRaytheonSystems
  - M3R
  - Ground Master 200
  - Ground Master 400
  - Sea Master 400
- Toshiba
  - J/FPS-4 Cheaper than J/FPS-3, produced by Toshiba
  - JMPQ-P13 Counter-battery radar, Toshiba
- VNIIRT Gamma DE mobile 3-dimensional solid-state AESA surveillance radar
- 50N6A multifunctional radar of the Vityaz missile system and 42S6 "Morfey" ("Morpheus")

== See also ==
- Radar configurations and types
- Receiver
- Passive electronically scanned array
- Low-probability-of-intercept radar (LPIR)
- Terrain-following radar
- Solid State Phased Array Radar System

== Bibliography ==
- Bell Labs (October 1975). ABM Research and Development at Bell Laboratories, Project History (PDF) (Technical report).
