= Ground Master 200 =

French military medium-range 3D radar

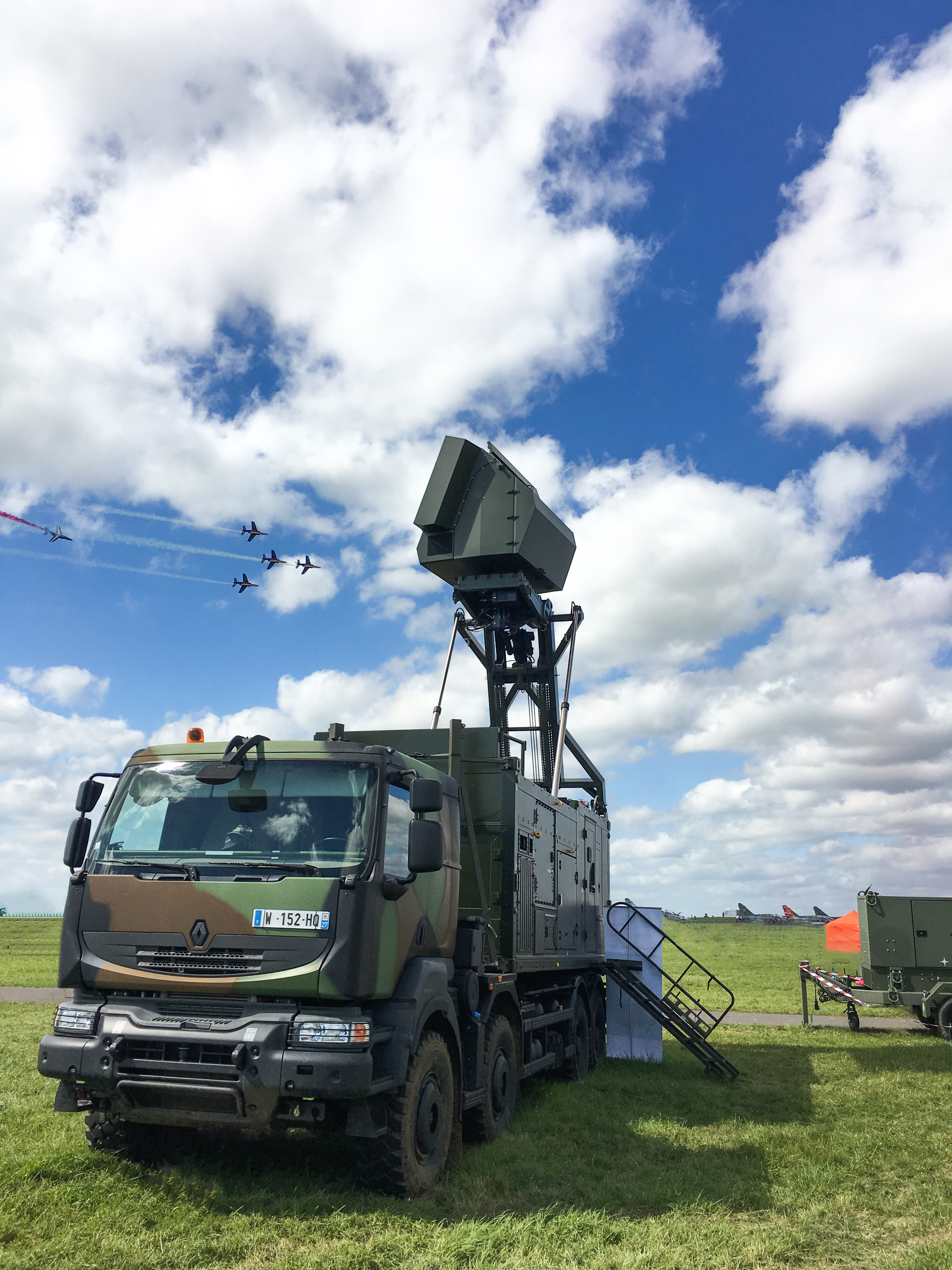
- Ground Master 200 in Évreux (France)
- Country of origin: France
- Introduced: 2008
- No. built: >60
- Type: Digital 3D AESA
- Frequency: S band
- RPM: 20 or 40
- Range: 250 km (160 mi)
- Altitude: 80,000 ft (24,000 m)
- Azimuth: 360°
- Elevation: -7° and 70°

The Ground Master 200 (GM200) is a medium range AESA 3D radar manufactured by Thales Group.

The GM200 can operate both as an independent air surveillance radar or as the sensor module of an air defence system. The GM200 also features a surface channel and a Rocket/Artillery/Mortar sense and warn capability.

The system fits in a 20 ft ISO shelter and weighs less than ten tons. It includes power generator unit, mast, and room for 2 workstations with a set of radio voice and data communications. The GM200 is transportable by road, rail, tactical aircraft (such as the C-130) or helicopter and can be set up in 15 minutes.

This radar is part of the Ground Master family alongside its GM200 MM/A and MM/C variants as well as the short-range GM60 and long-range GM400 and their respective variants. The GM200's unit cost is stated to be €30 million (FY2023).

== Main characteristics ==
=== Detection domain ===
- Instrumented range:
  - 250 km Surveillance
  - 100 km Engagement
- Ceiling: up to 80,000 feet
- Elevation coverage: 70°

=== Key Features ===
- Update rate: up to 1.5 s
- S-Band
- GaN transmitters
- Artificial Intelligence inspired algorithms
- Electronic Counter Counter Measures (ECCM) capabilities
- Full digital stacked beam
- Full doppler waveforms
- GaN Technology

=== Detection Performances ===
- Air Breathing Targets (ABTs)
- Helicopters (including hovering during pop-up phase)
- Cruise Missiles (CMs)
- Sea surface targets
- Rockets
- Artillery and Mortars
- UAV from Class I (Mini) up to Class IV (HALE).

== Operators ==
Note: The GM 200 MM/A and MM/C are not the same radar as the GM 200.

=== Current operators ===
Armenia (3)
3 systems ordered in 2023
France (8)
Orders:
- 4 ordered in 2014 with the SCCOA step 4 phase 2
- 4 ordered in February 2023 with the SCCOA step 5
Georgia (–)
GM200 and GM4000 installed on Renault Kerax 8×8 presented by the Georgian Army in May 2018
Indonesia (10)
10 GM200 system were bought as part of Indonesian Army Thales ForceSHIELD system.
Iraq (14)
14 ordered for €600 million.
Malaysia (1)
Ordered one system together with Thales ForceSHIELD Advanced Air Defence System.
Moldova (1)
Agreement made in October 2023 with the French government, one system delivered in 2023.
Portugal (1)
Portuguese Army ordered one Ground master 200 unit in 2024.
Serbia (6)
7 systems
Singapore (–)
Unknown numbers, locally known as Shikra radar. One system was displayed during Singapore Airshow 2014.
Ukraine (2)
Orders
- 1 delivered in July 2023, ordered in February 2023 and financed by France
- 1 ordered in June 2024 by France for Ukraine
