= Ground Master 200 Multi Mission =

Series of medium-range radars

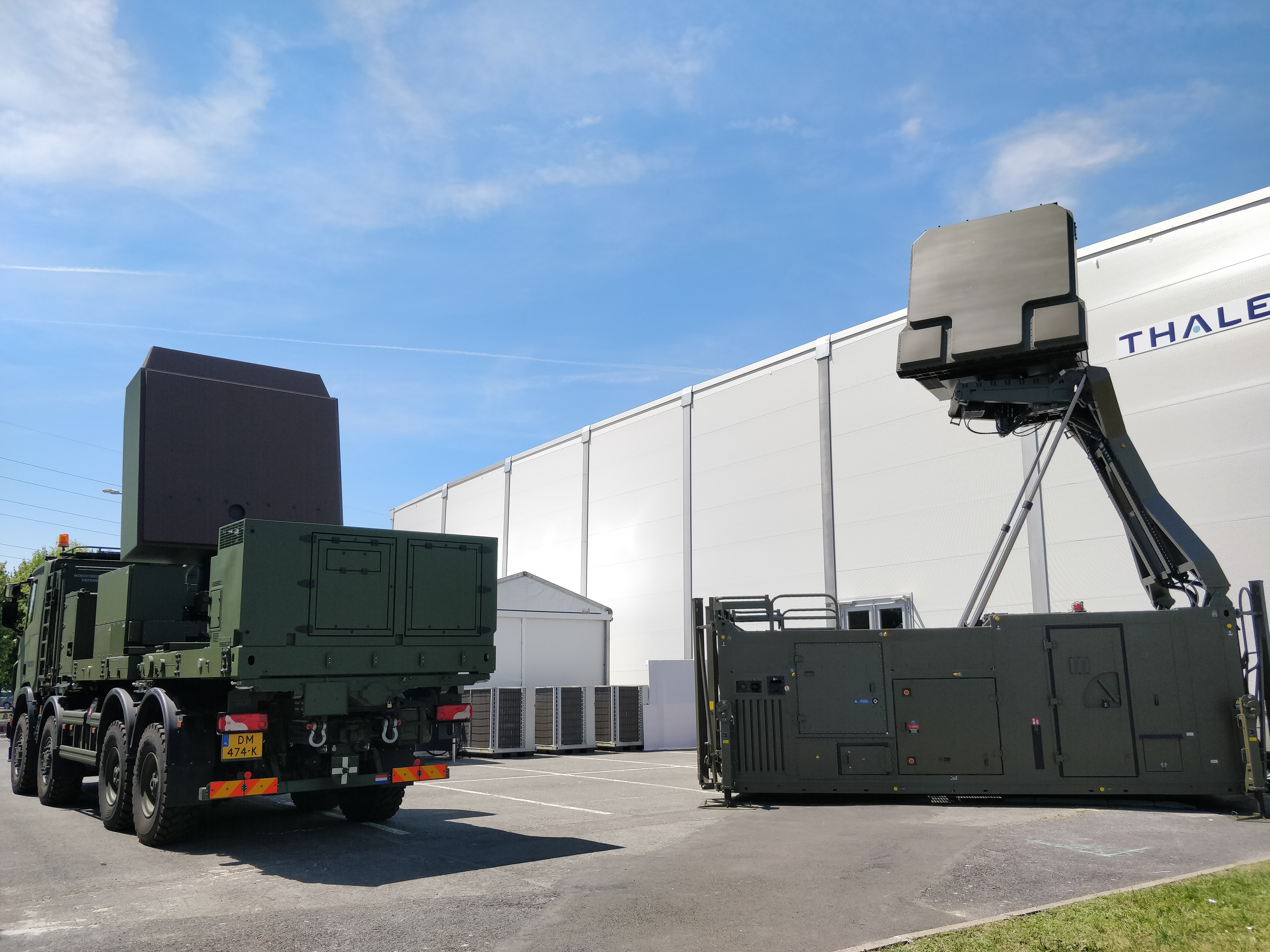
- Eurosatory 2022; GM200 MM/C (left) / GM200 MM/A (right)
- Country of origin: France; Netherlands
- Manufacturer: MM/A: Thales France (Limours); MM/C: Thales Nederland (Hengelo)
- Designer: MM/A: Thales France (Limours); MM/C: Thales Nederland (Hengelo)
- Introduced: MM/C: Feb 2024
- Type: MM/A: 4D, AESA, dual-axis multi beam, with: GaN TRM, IFF (mode 5): Role: Early warning radar, air-surveillance (missile / aircraft); Threats: aircraft, helicopters, UAS; MM/C: 4D, AESA, dual-axis multi beam, with GaN TRM: Role: air surveillance, detection, tracking and classification of threats; Threats: C-RAM / C-UAS (class I (mini) to class IV (HALE), ASuW, cruise missiles, aircraft and helicopters
- Frequency: S-Band (IEEE)
- Range: MM/A: Surveillance: 350 km (220 mi); Engagement: 150 km (93 mi); MM/C: Surveillance: 400 km (250 mi); Weapon locating: 100 km (62 mi)
- Altitude: MM/C: 30,000 m (98,000 ft)
- Azimuth: MM/A: 360° MM/C: 360°
- Elevation: MM/A: up to 80°
- Other names: MMR (multi-mission radar): the MM/C in the Netherlands armed forces
- Related: Thales NS200

The Ground Master 200 Multi-Mission (GM200 MM) is a family of medium-range ground-based radars developed and manufactured by Thales.

Benefiting from the technology of the land-based Ground Master 200 and naval NS100/200 radar systems, the GM200 MM family consists of the GM200 MM/A, designed and manufactured in France, on the one hand; and the GM200 MM/C on the other, developed by the company's Dutch subsidiary, Thales Nederland, for, and in consultation with, the Royal Netherlands Army (RNLA). The two radars feature 4D Active Electronically Scanned Array (AESA) technology, a ‘dual-axis multi-beam’ technology providing flexibility in both elevation and bearing.

The first delivery of the GM200 MM/C to the RNLA took place on 14 February 2024.

== Design ==
There are two radars within the GM200 MM family:

- The GM200 MM/A (All-in-one) fits in a 20 ft ISO container and weighs 10 tons. It includes a power generator unit, an 8-meter-high-antenna, and room for 2 workstations with the voice and data radio communications. The GM200 MM/A can be set up in 15 minutes and be operated remotely or locally. The primary missions of the GM200 MM/A are Air Surveillance and GBAD (Ground Based Air Defence) up to MRAD (Medium Range Air Defence).
- The GM200 MM/C (Compact) is suited for Counter Battery and Weapon Locating operations and supports Very Short Ranged Air Defence (V/SHORAD) up to Medium range air defense (MRAD) missions. The radar is deployable in less than 2 minutes.

Both radars are transportable by road, rail or tactical aircraft.

The Ground Master 200 MM is a variant of the Ground Master 200, improving detection of small targets such as Unmanned Aerial Vehicles (UAVs) and Rockets, Artillery and Mortars (RAM).

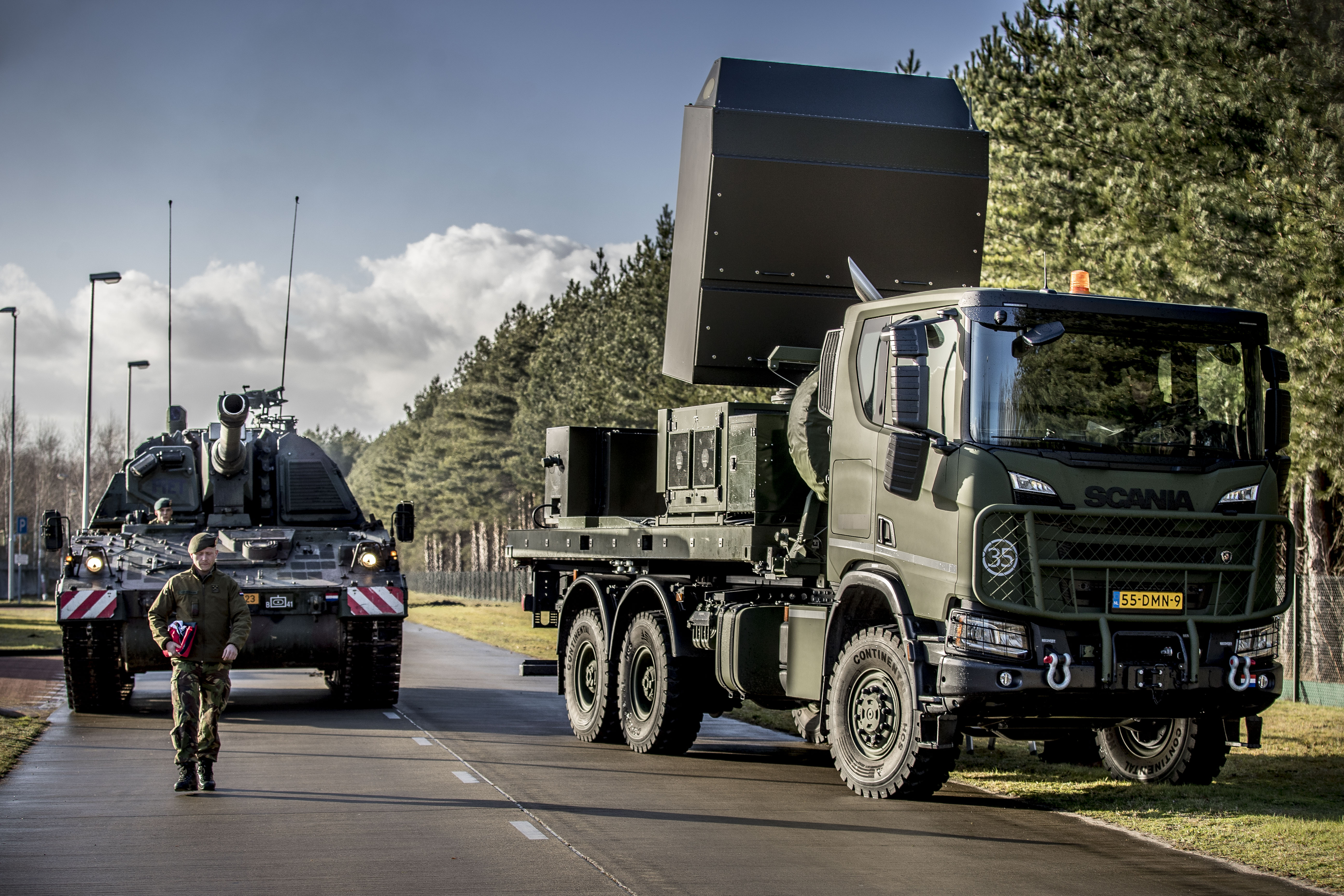
GM200 MM/C

== Main characteristics ==
=== Key Features ===
- Electronic Counter Counter Measures (ECCM) capabilities
- Full doppler waveforms
- Cyber protection

== Unit Price ==
The unit price for the GM200 MM/C variant is approximately 14.5 million EUR (based on a Danish purchase of five for 540 million DKK in 2022).

== Operators ==
=== Current operators ===
==== GM200 MM/C ====
Lithuania (1 in service, 5 on order)
GM 200 MM/C selected in 2023 to be used as counter-battery radar, to be installed on Mercedes-Benz Zetros 6×6 trucks. The contract is worth €126.7 million.
The Netherlands Armed Forces announced that the Netherlands (9), Denmark (5), Norway (8) and Lithuania, ordered a total of 28 radars as of February 2024, which means that Lituania purchased 6 radars.
The first delivery took place in November 2026.
Netherlands (26 ordered)

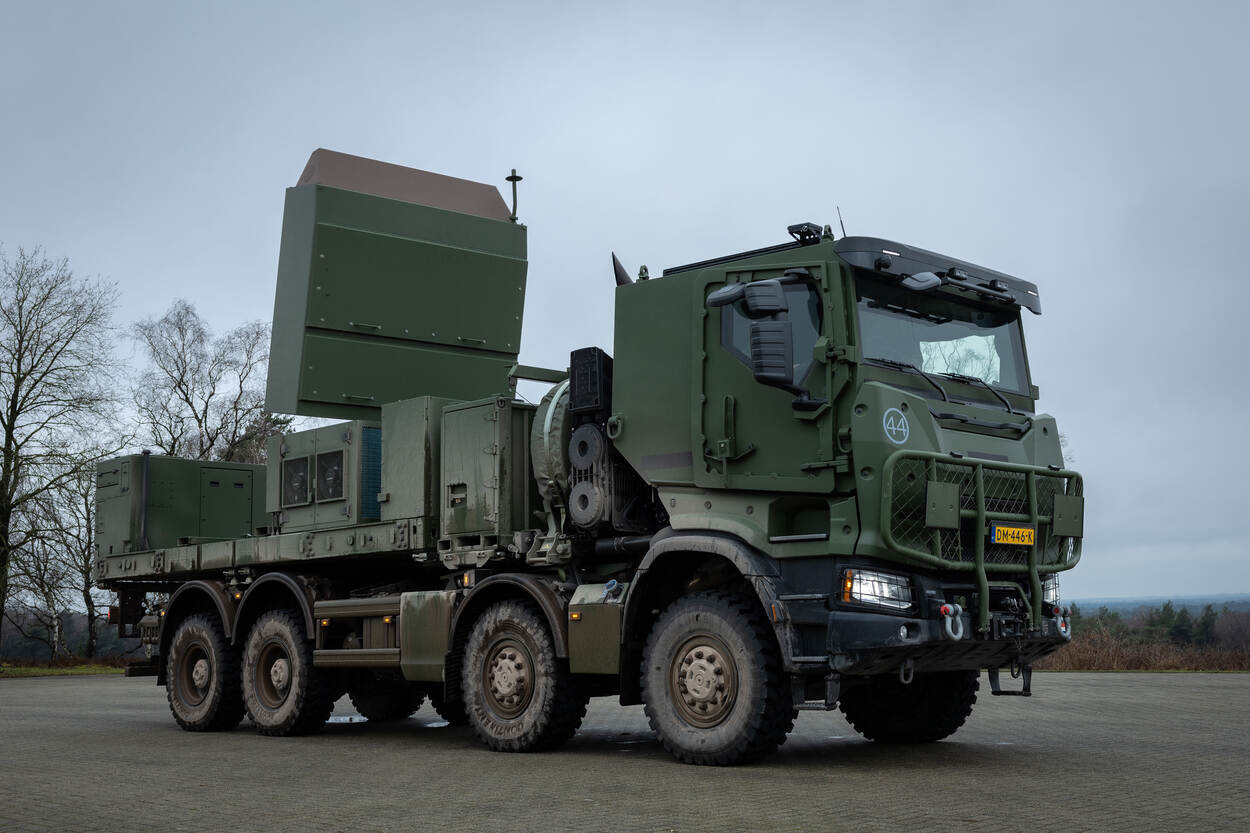
GM200 MM/C

Radars installed on Scania Gyraphus (100kN 8×8 trucks), known as the MMR in the Netherlands Armed Forces.
Orders:
- 9 in January 2019
- 7 (with an option for 2) in April 2024 (counter-battery role)
- 2 in September 2024, option activated from a contract signed in April 2024
- 8 in October 2024, for the air and missile defence
Deliveries:
- First in February 2024.
Note: the 26 radars ordered are in the GM200 MM/C variants, the use is:
- 14 to be used for missile defence
- 12 to be used as a counter-battery radar and light UAV surveillance

=== Future operators ===
==== GM200 MM/A ====
Brazil (unknown quantity ordered)
GM200 MM/A ordered in June 2024.
Ireland (1 ordered)
One GM200 MM/A ordered in October 2026, with 4 GM400 α radars.
Romania (12 ordered)
Purchase approved in May 2026, purchased through the SAFE Loan programme.
The order for 12 GM200 MM/A was signed in July 2026.
Qatar (unknown quantity ordered)
GM200 MM/A ordered in January 2026, with also GM400 α radars.
Switzerland (5 planned to be ordered)
System selected in November 2026 (Thales Suisse SA), and to be purchased as part of the Armament Programme 2026, replacing the TAFLIR radar, part of the Tmob Radar MR (Teilmobiles Radarsysteme mittler Reichweite - Mobile tactical radars - medium range).
Five systems are expected.

==== GM200 MM/C ====
Belgium (14 ordered)
The Belgian Defense Minister confirmed joining the Netherlands air defence model, which includes the GM 200 MM/C radar systems used with the NASAMS-3. Belgium decided to purchase 10 fire units. This programme is also being joined by the Luxembourg Armed Forces which will buy one NASAMS-3 fire unit.
Denmark (5 ordered)
5 GM200 MM/C ordered in October 2023.
Norway (8 ordered)
5 GM200 MM/C ordered in May 2021 with an option for 3 radars.
3 GM200 MM/C ordered in November 2022.
Sweden (unknown quantity ordered)
GM 200 MM/C contracted in April 2025 as part of the "Sensorsystem Ny" programme.It is a successor to the PS-871 radar. The delivery is planned for 2026, and the contract has a value of SEK 1 billion.

=== Potential operators ===
United Kingdom (unknown quantity)
The UK plans to procure the GM 200 MM/C as part of the Serpens Project. The radar systems might be installed on mission modules for the Boxer.
