= Capture of Southern Naval Base =

Blockade during the annexation of Crimea by the Russian Federation

Coordinates: 45.34000°N 33.01000°E

The blockade of the Ukrainian fleet in Donuzlav
- Part of the Annexation of Crimea by the Russian Federation
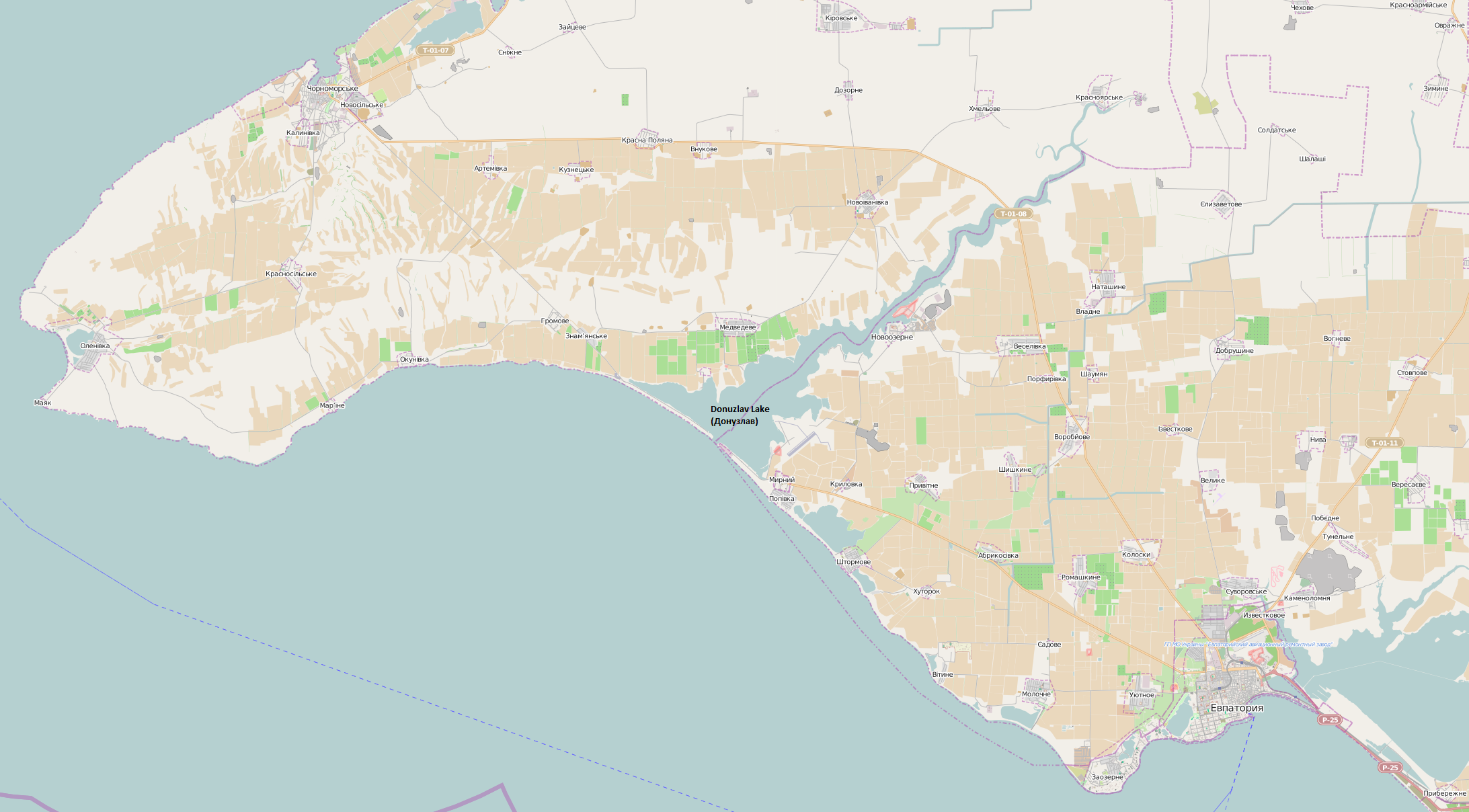
- Location of Donuzlav Bay
Date	3 – 26 March 2014 (3 weeks and 2 days)
Location	Donuzlav, Crimea, Ukraine
Result	Russian victory

Belligerents
Russia	Ukraine

Commanders and leaders
(Russia) Viktor Chirkov (Russia) Aleksandr Vitko (Autonomous Republic of Crimea) Denis Berezovsky (surrendered) (defected on March 2)	(Ukraine) Ihor Tenyukh (Ukraine) Serhiy Hayduk (Ukraine) Yuriy Fedash (Ukraine) Dmytro Kovalenko

Units involved
Russian Navy: Black Sea Fleet	Ukrainian Navy

Strength
1 missile cruiser 4 support ships 2 helicopters	1 corvette 3 minesweepers 2 landing ships

Casualties and losses
None	13 ships captured, some later returned

The siege of Southern Naval Base lasted from 3 March 2014 until its definitive capture on 27 March 2014. The action began with the blockade of Donuzlav bay by the Russian missile cruiser Moskva. The Russian Navy later scuttled the Russian anti-submarine ship Ochakov and several smaller vessels in the mouth of the bay to prevent Ukrainian ships from sailing to open sea and reaching the Ukrainian fleet in Odesa. As a result, 13 Ukrainian ships were bottled up and eventually captured by Russia in Donuzlav bay. The blockade ended when the Russian Navy seized the last ship under the Ukrainian flag in Crimea, the minesweeper Cherkasy.

== Military base ==
In 1961 a 200-meter canal was built, linking Donuzlav bay to the settlement of Novoozerne. Since then, the region's economy has benefited from the Southern Naval Base. After the separation of the Black Sea Fleet, the base passed under the control of Ukraine. The Southern Naval Base of Ukraine was created. Joint exercises between NATO and Ukraine, Exercize Sea Breeze, took place at Donuzlav, in 1997, which drew disapproval from Russia, as well as the pro-Russian forces of the peninsula.

At the beginning of the blockade, the following military units and naval units of Ukraine were moored in Novoozerne: 257 combined armaments and assets (air force A4290), a naval intelligence station (A / 343 military unit), the Southern Naval Base Ukraine (air force A2506) and 21 districts of the coastal surveillance system (airborne A4249). Also, in the Donuzlav area in the village Mirny is an abandoned naval air station, home of Be-12 flying boats and Ka-25 and Ka-27 helicopters, all of them designed for anti-submarine warfare.

As of March 2014, the ships of five brigades of surface ships of the Naval Forces were based in Novoozerne:

- Corvette Vinnytsia (U206); (Returned)
- Minesweeper Chernihiv (U310);
- Minesweeper Cherkasy (U311);
- Minesweeper Henichesk (U360); (Returned)
- Middle landing ship Kirovohrad (U401);( Returned)
- Large landing ship Konstantin Olshansky (U402);
- Transport Horlivka (U753); (Returned)
- Anti-diversion boat Theodosius (U240);
- Torpedo cutter Kherson (U891);
- Dispatch boat Dobropillia (U854). (Returned)

In the structure of eight separate divisions of the ships were the provision of:

- Fire rescue vessel Evpatoria (U728); (Returned)
- Seagoing tug Kovel (U831); (Returned)
- Towboat Novoozerne (U942); (Returned)

== Background ==
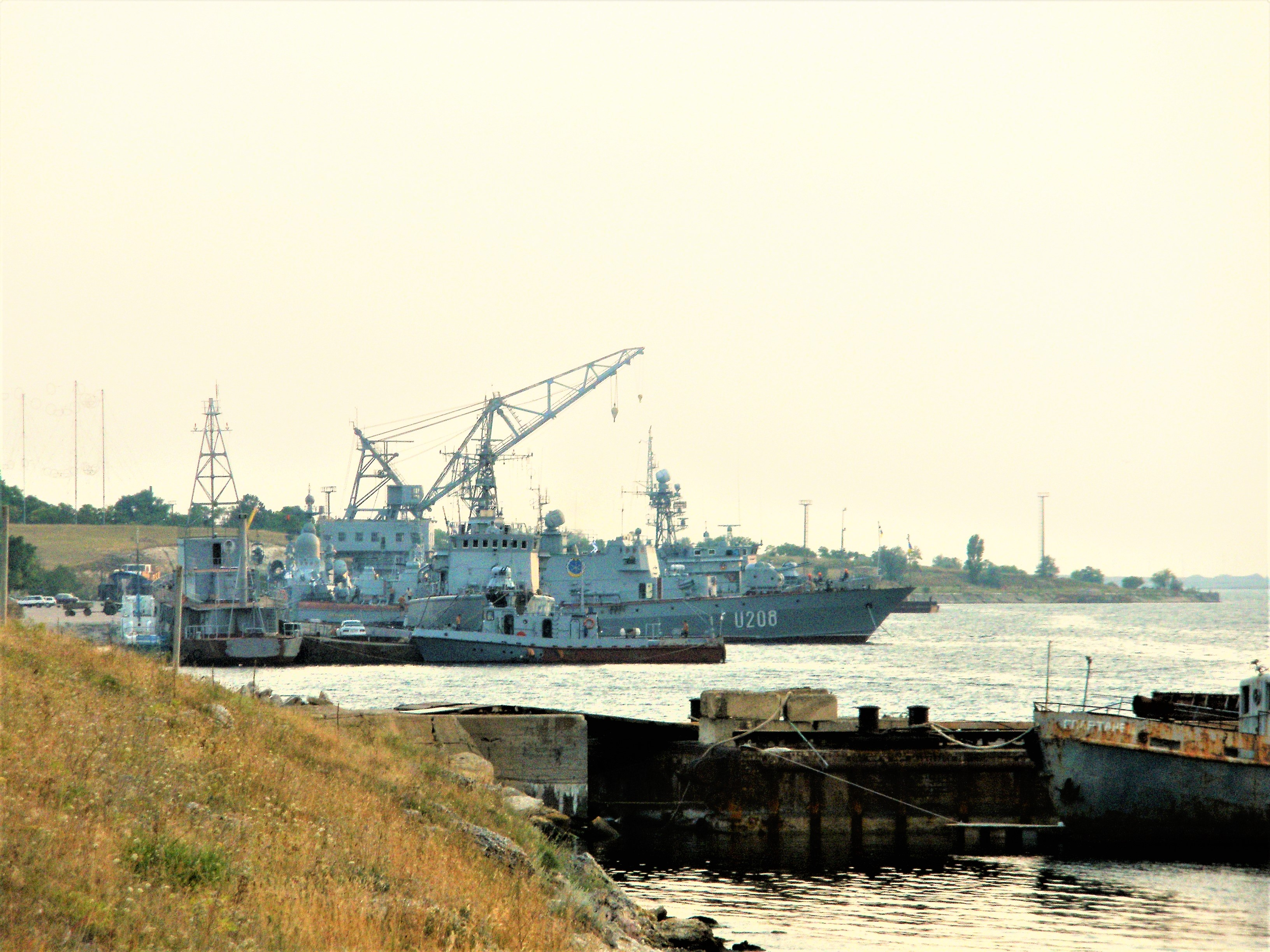
Southern Naval Base in 2008

From 23 to 27 February, the executive power of Sevastopol and the Autonomous Republic of Crimea changed. The new Crimean authorities have declared illegitimacy of the authorities of Ukraine and appealed for help to the leadership of Russia, which gave its support.

Since February 27, the actions of numerous armed groups have been unfolding on the territory of the Crimea - some of these armed groups were self-defense detachments from local residents, Berkuvtsev, Cossacks and representatives of various Russian public organizations who came to Crimea on their own initiative to "protect their compatriots". On the other hand - a group of well-armed and equipped men in uniform without identifying signs. Until the end of the Crimean crisis, these formations provided control over strategic objects and local authorities, their protection and functioning, and blocked Ukrainian military units and headquarters. The Ukrainian and Western media, the Ukrainian authorities and the leadership of the Western powers from the very first days said with certainty that they were Russian forces, qualifying their actions as aggression, military invasion and occupation. Russian officials until April 2014 refused to publicly admit this.

On March 1, after receiving an appeal from the Government of Crimea and Viktor Yanukovych, Russian President Vladimir Putin appealed to the Federation Council on the use of Russian troops on the territory of Ukraine. The same day, the Federation Council, having gathered for an extraordinary meeting, agreed to use Russian troops in Ukraine.

Also on March 1, 2014 a decree of President of Ukraine Oleksandr Turchynov appointed Denis Berezovsky commander of the Naval Forces of Ukraine. The next day, he swore an oath to the new leadership of Crimea and was appointed Commander of the Navy of Crimea. That same day he was removed from office by a decision of Defense Minister of Ukraine Ihor Tenyukh and decree by President of Ukraine. Instead of Berezovsky, commander Serhiy Hayduk was appointed.

== Main events ==
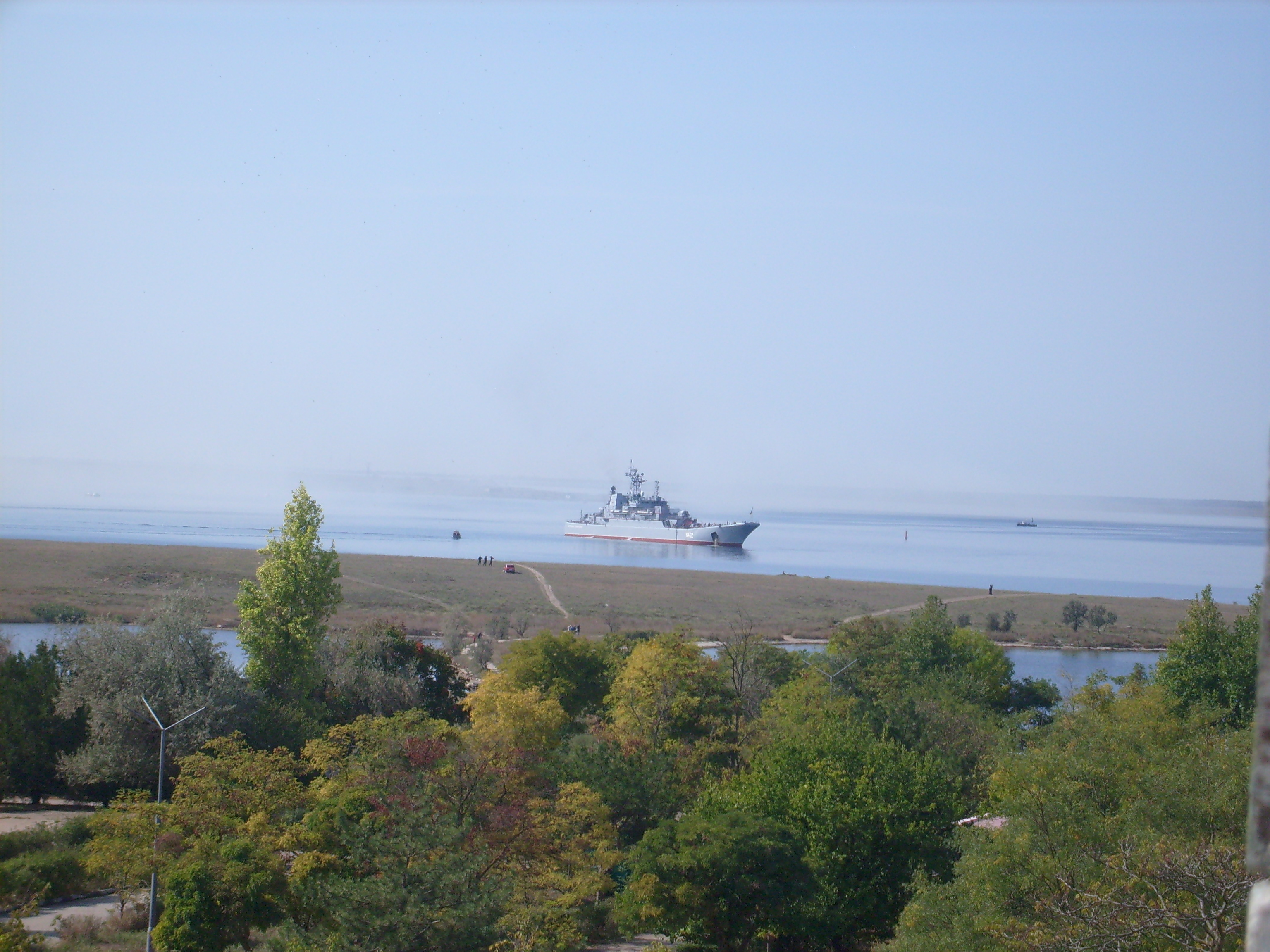
The landing ship Konstantin Olshansky during exercises in Donuzlav in 2009

According to Ukrainian minister of defense Ihor Tenyukh, at the moment of the blockade, only four ships remained in quasi-combatant capacity, including the large landing ship Konstantin Olshansky, which was based in Donuzov. Over the question why Ukrainian ships were not withdrawn from Crimea at the end of February 2014, Tenyukh accused the commander-in-chief of the Armed Forces of Ukraine, Yuriy Ilyin, who, according to him did not issue an order. However, Ilyin himself accused Tenyukh of the absence of such an order.

On March 2, 2014, four KamAZ trucks full of armed people arrived in Novoazerne. On March 3 information appeared on the blocking of the Southern Naval Base of Ukraine by military servicemen of the Russian Federation. The 200-meter-long exit from the Donuzlav bay was blocked by the flagship of the Black Sea Fleet of Russia, missile cruiser Moskva, supported by four other ships. On land, the Ukrainian base was surrounded by about 100 Russian servicemen. At the same time, Ukrainian Navy's ships were ordered to take off from the pier and gather in Donuzlav bay.

The commander of the Black Sea Fleet of the Russian Federation, Aleksandr Vitko, personally came to negotiations with the command of the part, during which he offered to surrender and oath to the Crimean people, but he was denied. Denied and in execution of the order of Denis Berezovsky - the ships retired to the berth and handed over the weapons to the warehouses. On the morning of March 4 Crimean Prime Minister Sergei Aksyonov said that the personnel of the Ukrainian military units were ready to submit to the new government of Crimea and that commanders who refused to do his bidding would be prosecuted.

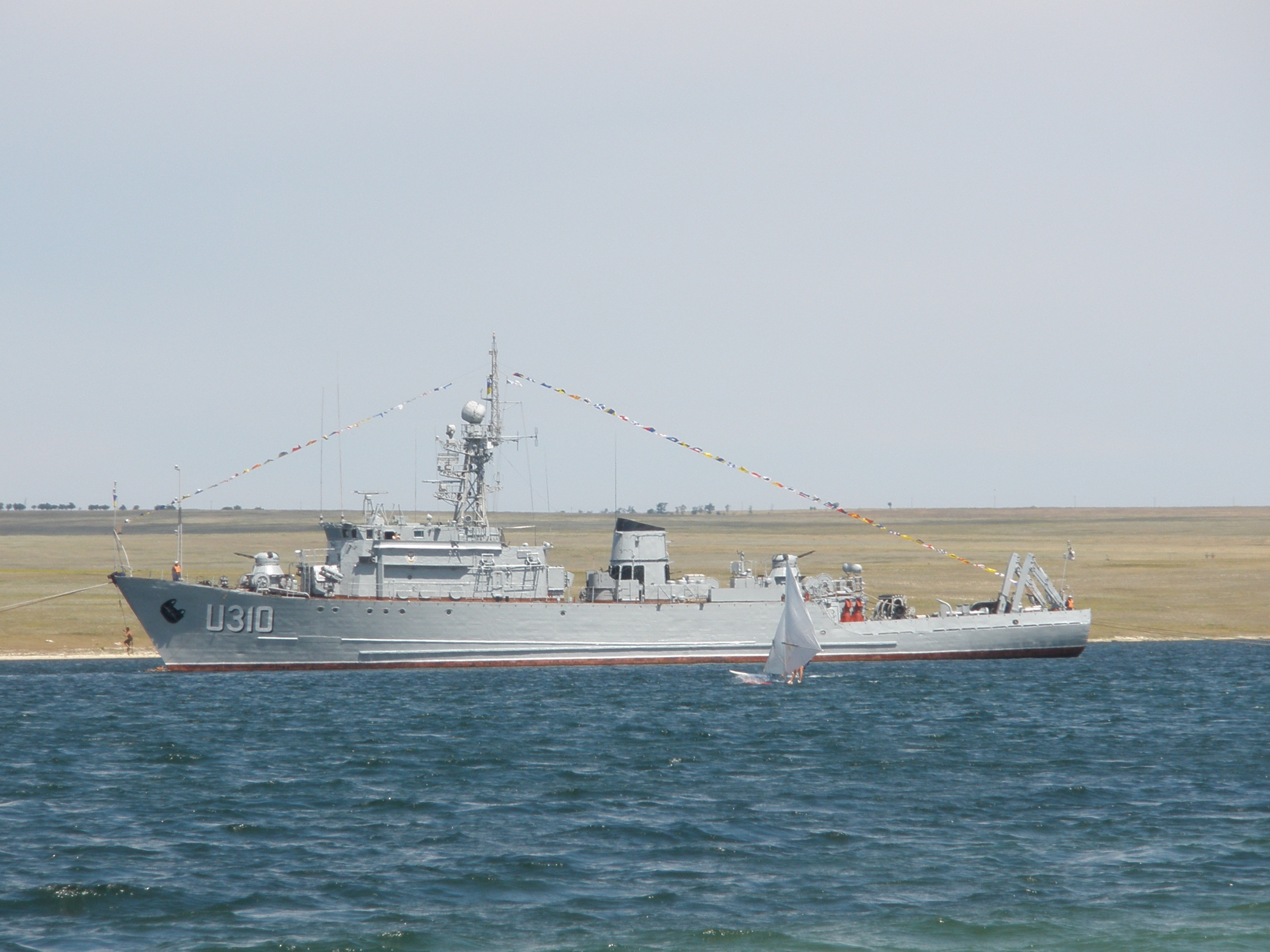
The minesweeper Chernihiv in Donuzlav in 2008

On March 4, armed people without identification marks began to dig trenches near the berth. On March 5, Donuzlav blocked the exit of ships SFP-183, Moskow, Shtel and Lightning. In order to prevent the release of Ukrainian ships to Odesa on the night of March 5 to 6, 2014, the light cruiser Ochakov (length about 180 meters) and the rescue ship Shakhty, both of them belonging to the Russian Federation, were scuttled at the exit from Donuzlav. Ochakov obstructed the mouth of the bay. The sinking of Ochakov took about 80 minutes.

In connection with the blockade of Ukrainian ships in Donuzlav, the Ministry of Foreign Affairs of Ukraine strongly protested to the Russian Federation. On March 7, fire-fighting boat BM-416 was also sunk as an obstacle; it had a displacement of 30-40 tons.

On March 13, in response to the intentional sinking of a fourth ship at the mouth of the bay, the Ministry of Foreign Affairs of Ukraine handed a verbal note to Russia over the scuttled ships and the threat to environmental safety in the Black Sea. Director of the Information Policy Department of the Ministry of Foreign Affairs of Ukraine Yevhen Perebyinis stated that the responsibility for damage to the marine environment and natural resources rested on the Russian side.

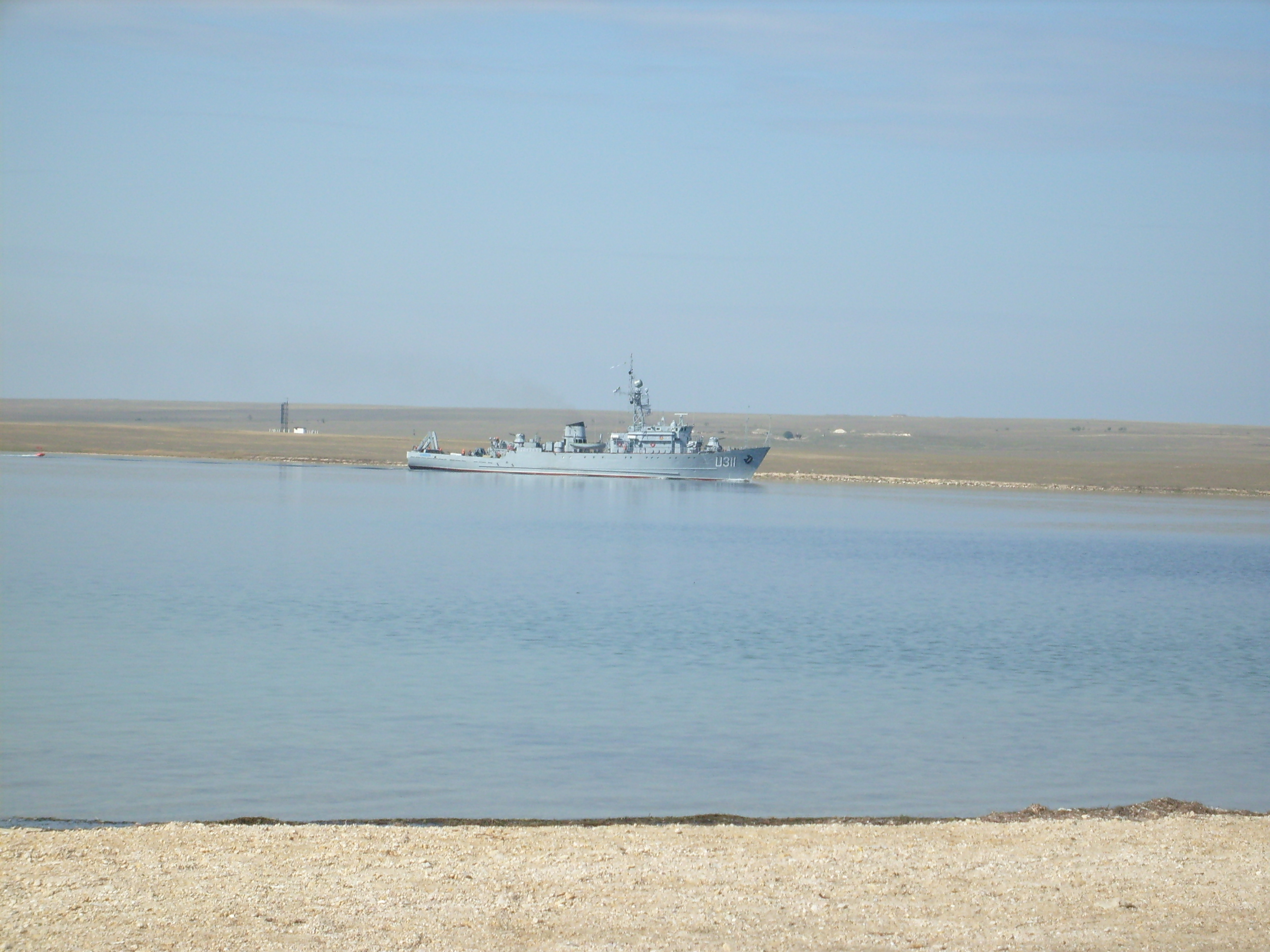
The minesweeper Cherkasy during exercises in Donuzlav in 2009

Also, on March 13, farmers from the Rivne region delivered about 25 tons of food to the Ukrainian sailors. Base commander Vladimir Dogonov said that there was a lot of assistance to the naval base, to the point that they shared it with neighboring military units. With the assistance of the Red Cross, residents of Kropyvnytskyi and Novomyrhorod were able to pass along the aid. Yuri Fedash, commander of the minesweeper Cherkasy, said that Crimean Tatars from the neighboring villages of Medvedev and Kirovske also provided assistance.

Following a referendum on the Crimea status on March 16, the seamen requested a clear plan from the Ukrainian leadership for further action on the evacuation of servicemen and their families from Donuzlav. However, the acting president of Ukraine, Oleksandr Turchynov, said that the Ministry of Defense and the General Staff issued orders to protect the ships. Turchynov also stressed the need to withstand and prevent further Russian invasion of Ukraine.

Volodymyr Komoedov, deputy of the State Duma of Russia and former commander of the Black Sea Fleet, said that Ukrainian vessels that were in the Crimea would become Russian after the referendum.

On March 19, 2014, the headquarters of the Southern Naval Base of Ukraine went under the control of the Russian Federation. The headquarters gates near the checkpoint were demolished by a bulldozer. Russian military vehicles blocked the road to the barracks. After that, the ships Vinnitsa, Konstantin Olshansky, Kirovograd, Cherkassy and Chernigov sailed to the middle of Donuzlav to prevent capture. On March 20, Vitaliy Zvyagintsev, commander of the five brigades of the surface ships of the Naval Forces of Ukraine, who defected to Russia, ordered all ships to berth.

On March 21, three machine gun points were deployed on the shore, and the berth was occupied by Russian military personnel. On the same day, the ships Kirovograd, Theodosius and Chernigov approached the berth and surrendered. The commander of Kirovgrad, Captain of the 3rd rank Volodymyr Khromchenkov, called the Shuster Live transmission live in the evening and told that the ships are waiting for an adequate order for their further fate, adding that the leadership is not connected with him. The next day, the commander contacted the head of the Presidential Administration Serhiy Pashynskyi.

Later, the commander of Kirovograd, Volodymyr Khromchenkov, the commander of Theodosius, O. Bily and the commander of Chernigov, Boris Paliy defected to the Russian side.

On March 21, the minesweeper Cherkasy made the first attempt to break through Donuzlav. Cherkasy was hit by mooring cables from one of the scuttled ships and tried to break free. The operation lasted about two hours, but the minesweeper was not able to do it because of a lack of power. The commander of the ship Yuri Fedash asked for help from the minesweeper Chernigov, but he was denied. On this day, two officers, one midshipman and nine people disembarked from Cherkassy. Converserly, three sailors from the minesweeper Chernigov climbed onboard.

On March 22, the corvette Vinnitsa, raised the St. Andrew flag, and the commander Sergei Zagolnikov eventually defected to Russia. On the same day, Sergei Gaiduk said that food supplies on ships that are in Donuzlav would last only 10 days. On March 23, the minesweeper Henichesk attempted to exit Donuzlav, however, it was intercepted by a tug of the Black Sea Fleet of Russia. On the same day, Yuri Fedash, commander of the Cherkasy, said to a reporter that he was in contact with the Ukrainian Navy headquarters.

On the night of March 24, another small vessel was scuttled by the Russian Navy at the bay. Later, the Konstantin Olshansky laid smokescreens, but was still captured by the Russian boat U8301 using automatic weapons and small grenades. The minesweeper Henichesk was captured on the same date. Captain Dmitry Kovalenko, commander of the Konstantin Olshansky said that the issue of scuttling his ship never was on the table. At the time of capture of the ship was crewed by only 20 seamen from a usual complement of 120. The U8301 launched about 400 grenades around Konstantin Olshansky before the amphibious ship was assaulted by a boarding party. The Ministry of Foreign Affairs of Ukraine dubbed the seizure of the ships by Russia "piracy".

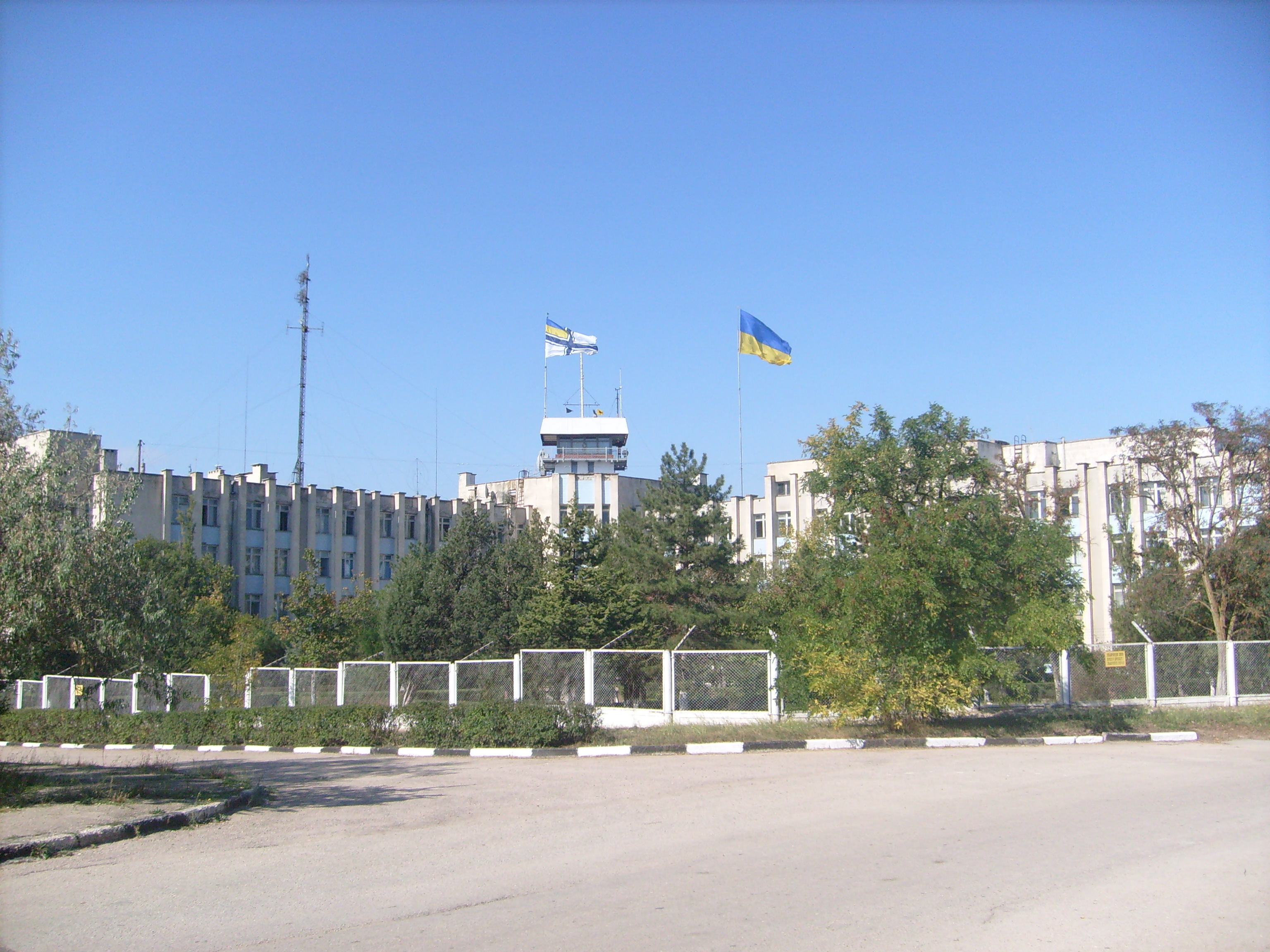
Headquarters of the Southern Naval Base of Ukraine

Cherkasy made an attempt to leave Donuzlav, passing between the wrecks of two ships. As a result, the trawler was intercepted by a tug, from which there were attempts to board the minesweeper. According to Fedash, he considered the possibility of capturing the Russian vessel, but the leadership in Kyiv refused. He also said that in order to prevent the seizure of Cherkasy, they fired small arms on the water and used grenades. Also on March 24 President of Ukraine Oleksandr Turchinov said that the Ministry of Defense was given an order to withdraw military units from the Crimea.

On March 25, an unknown boat traveled around the minesweeper Cherkasy, the last Ukrainian ship in Crimea. Cherkasy was eventually captured by the ocean-going tug Kovel, three speedboats, and two Mi-35 helicopters. The ship maneuvered for at least two hours, but was eventually stormed using firearms and light-and-noise grenades. According to Fedash, Spetsnaz forces from the 16th Brigade participated in the capture of Cherkasy.

During the assault there were no casualties, but control mechanisms of the ship were damaged by the Russian forces. As a result, the tug Kovel towed Cherkasy to a harbor berth. The next day the crew went to the coast and traveled to the mainland Ukraine, the last to left the ship was commander Yuri Fedash, after which the Ukrainian flag was removed from the minesweeper.

== Return of captured ships ==
Following the capture of Ukrainian ships, Alexander Turchinov instructed the Defense Minister of Ukraine Mykhailo Koval that "no warships should remain in captivity". On April 19, 2014, the ships Kirovograd, Vinnytsia, Kherson, Kovel, Gorlovka and Novoozernye were returned to Ukraine and relocated to Odesa. The transfer took place in neutral waters, to which the ships were towed by the Russian side, after which the Ukrainian flags were again raised on the ships. In May the minesweeper Genichesk and passenger boat Dobropillya were transferred to Ukraine.

As of June 2015, the ships Chernihiv, Cherkasy and Konstantin Olshansky had not been returned to Ukraine.

== Memorials ==
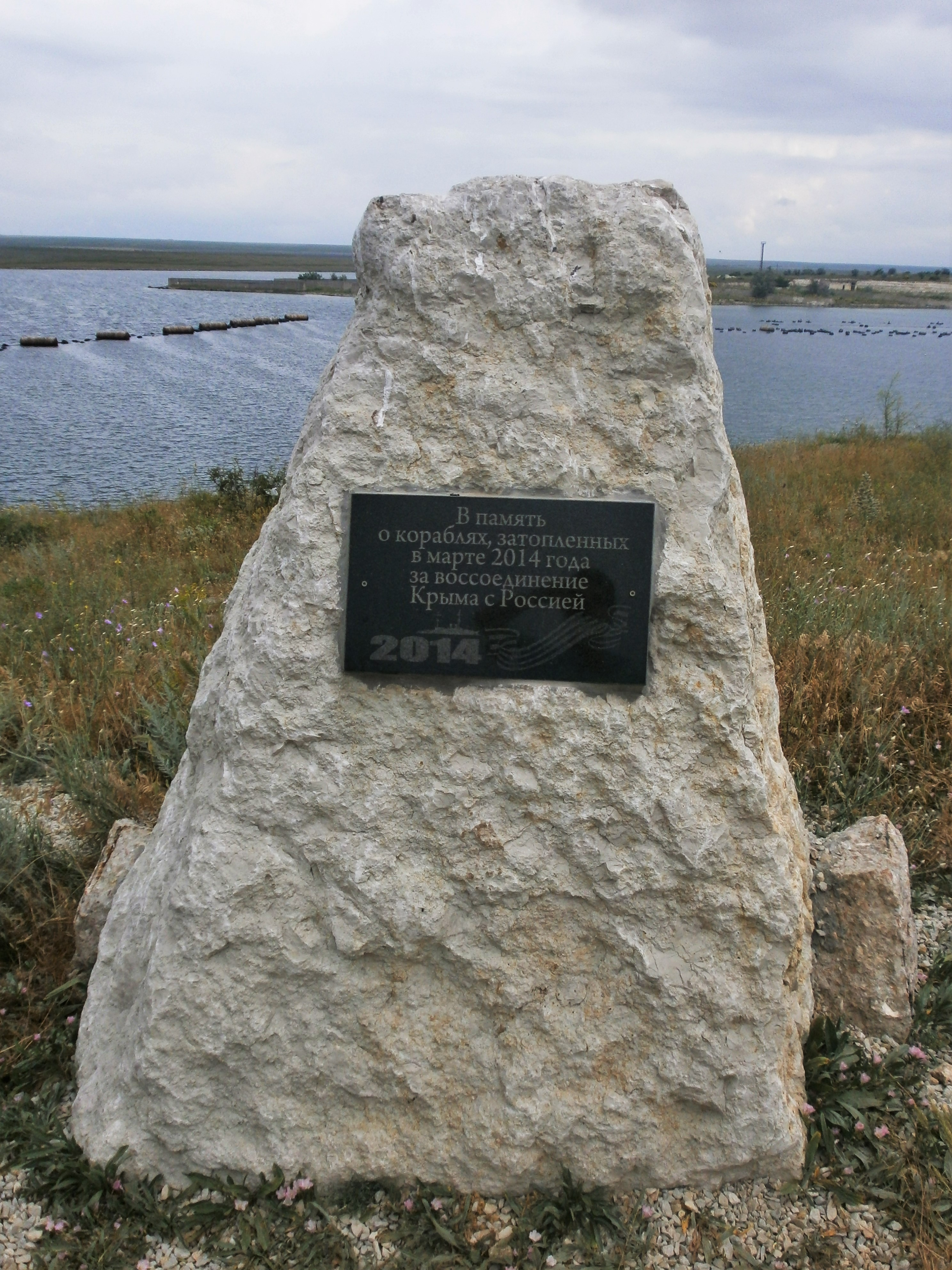
A memorial sign for the scuttled ships in Novoozerne

=== Russian side ===
On August 8, 2014, in Novoozerne, the head of the State Council of the Crimea, Volodymyr Konstantinov, dedicated a memorial plaque to the scuttled ships that blocked the exit of the naval ships of the Naval Forces of Ukraine. On the memorial plaque it is written: In memory of the ships that were intentionally sunk in March 2014 for the reunification of the Crimea with Russia.

=== Ukrainian side ===
On March 27, 2014, the commander of the minesweeper Cherkasy, Yury Fedash, was awarded the title of honorary citizen of the city of Cherkasy, and on August 24 the Order of Danylo Halytsky was presented. On April 4, congratulations were received by the crew of the minesweeper Cherkasy in the center of the city of the same name, where they were greeted as heroes.

In April 2014, the members of the rock band Lyapis Trubetskoy invited the crewmembers of the Konstantin Olshansky to their concert in Odesa and called the Ukrainian sailors in Donuzlav "heroes". They also noted a video clip that was shot on a ship, where sailors perform the song "Warriors of the World". However, it is erroneously believed that the video was taken on the Cherkasy minesweeper. On April 6, 2014, before the match between Dynamo Kyiv and Kharkiv Metalist within the framework of the Ukrainian Championship, seamen from Kirovograd were invited to the stadium Olimpiysky, where they were received as heroes.

On August 24, 2014, during a military parade on the occasion of the Independence Day of Ukraine, the President of Ukraine, Petro Poroshenko, said: "Ukraine will never forget the actions of the crew of the minesweeper Cherkasy, which recently maneuvered and defended their ship in the Donuzlav bay". The actions of the minesweeper inspired the 2018 featured film Cherkasy by Timur Yashchenko.

== See also ==
- Battle of Sibenik
- Battle of Santiago de Cuba
- Scuttling of the French fleet at Toulon
- Cherkasy (film)
