= List of military units in the 2014 Russian annexation of Crimea =

This is a list of military units in the 2014 Crimean crisis. At the date of writing (May 2014) this includes (a) the Armed Forces of Ukraine units stationed in Crimea at the time the crisis began, (b) the Russian units stationed in the Crimea at the time the crisis began, and (c) the Russian units that entered Crimea until the peninsula was formally annexed by the Russian Federation.

== Russia ==
By governmental treaty, Russia was allowed to station a limited number of troops in Crimea, specifically 25.000. During the conflict, there appeared numerous fully equipped soldiers, who bore no military rank insignia or cockade. The official position of the Russian government was that Russia was uninvolved in events on the peninsula and that these troops did not belong to the Russian federation, but were based on the local initiatives.

Many vehicles used by unmarked soldiers have Russian license plates. Ukrainian troops reported that the pro-Russian forces stated they were Russian, spoke perfect Russian, and in one case arrived in Russian planes

=== Commanders ===
- Chief of General Staff - General of the Army Valery Gerasimov
- Commander, Southern Military District -
- Russian Occupational Forces - Lieutenant General Igor Turcheniuk, deputy commander, Southern Military District
- Black Sea Fleet - Vice Admiral Aleksandr Vitko
- Main Intelligence Administration (GRU) - Lieutenant General Igor Sergun

=== Land force ===
- 18th Detached Yevpatorian Red Banner Guards Motorised Rifle Brigade (Chechen Republic) (18-я гвардейская Евпаторийская Краснознаменная мотострелковая бригада).
  - 1st Mechanized Battalion "Vostok"
- 31st Air Assault Brigade (Airborne Forces) (Ulyanovsk)
- 76th Guards Air Assault Division (Airborne Forces), possibly (Pskov)
- 7th Guards Airborne Division (Airborne Forces) (Novorossiisk), possibly
- 22nd Spetsnaz Brigade (GRU) (Krasnodar Krai), allegedly
- 45th Detached Reconnaissance Regiment (Moscow)

=== Navy ===
- Black Sea Fleet
  - 810th Naval Infantry Brigade
  - Kuban Cossacks (used as auxiliaries)
  - four ships purposely scuttled to block the Southern Naval Base of Ukraine
  - Important ships: Moskva
- Baltic Fleet
- Northern Fleet

== Ukraine ==
On 19 March 2014, the Ukrainian military announced plans to withdraw all personnel and their families (up to 25,000 people) from the Crimean peninsula.

Units that RUSI identified in the Crimea:

- 55th Anti-Aircraft Rocket Regiment
- 36th Separate Coastal Defense Brigade, Pereval'ne
  - 5th Marine Battalion, Feodosiya
- 801st Naval Spetsnaz Battalion, Feodosiya

=== Air force ===
- 204th Tactical Aviation Brigade, Belbek Air Base: Base mostly occupied by pro-Russian forces since February 27, fully taken over by Russian soldiers on 23 March.

=== Navy ===
On 19 March, Russian media reported that the Russian flag flew over 189 Ukrainian military units, and that there were no naval vessels in Crimea still flying the Ukrainian flag.

==== Southern Naval Base (Ukraine) ====
The Ukrainian fleet was largely surrounded by the Russian fleet and thus inoperable by the Ukrainian command. On the Donuzlav Lake since the night between 5 and 6 March, seven Ukrainian vessels were blocked by sunken Russian vessels. Lutsk (U205), Vinnytsia (U206), Chernihiv (U310), Cherkasy (U311), Henichesk (U360), Kirovohrad (U401) and Konstyantin Olschansky (U402)

==== Sevastopol Naval Base ====
Two Ukrainian vessels were trapped in the Bay of Sevastopol at the Streletska bukhta, a submarine Zaporizhzhia (U01) and a small anti-submarine vessel Khmelnytskyi U208.

=== Land forces ===
==== Internal Troops of Ukraine ====
- 9th Independent Interior Troops Brigade, Simferopol
- 42nd Independent Interior Troops Brigade, Sevastopol
- 47th Independent Interior Troops Brigade, Feodosia
- 15th Independent Interior Troops Battalion, Yevpatoria
- 18th Motor Police Battalion, Gaspra

==== State Border Guard Service ====
- Independent Special Purpose Border Guard Battalion, Yalta

== Autonomous Republic of Crimea ==
Crimea was controlled by a mixture of militias and unmarked, pro-Russian soldiers. The new authorities in Crimea announced the creation of the independent Armed Forces of Crimea, which as of 10 March apparently included about 186 soldiers.
