= Cherkasy (film) =

2019 Ukrainian film

- Черкаси
- Directed by: Tymur Yashchenko
- Based on: Defense of the Ukrainian minesweeper U311 Cherkasy (2014)
- Starring: Yevhen Lamakh; Dmytro Sova; Roman Semysal; Vadym Lyalko; Ruslan Koval
- Production company: State Cinema of Ukraine
- Distributed by: Multi Media Distribution (MMD) UA
- Release dates: 16 July 2019 (Odesa International Film Festival); 27 February 2020 (Ukraine)
- Country: Ukraine
- Language: Ukrainian
- Budget: ₴40 million

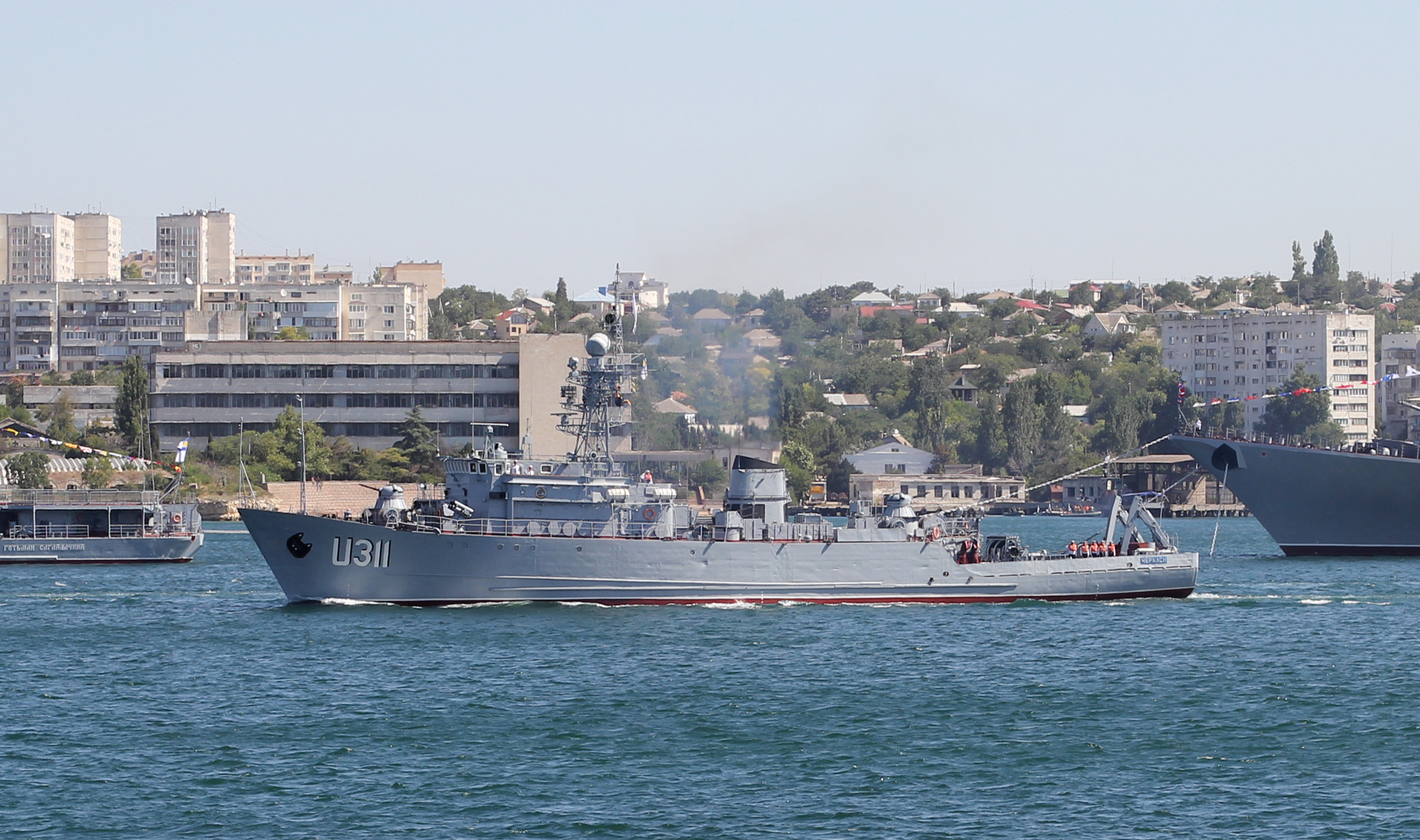
U311 Cherkasy in 2012

Cherkasy (Ukrainian: «Черкаси», pronounced [tʃerˈkɑsɪ]), also known as U311 Cherkasy, is a Ukrainian feature film directed by Tymur Yashchenko about the defense of the eponymous naval Natya-class minesweeper, blocked by Russian troops in Donuzlav Bay, Crimea during the 2014 capture of Southern Naval Base. The film was created with the support of the State Cinema of Ukraine.

The premiere of the festival version of the film took place on 16 July 2019, at the Odesa International Film Festival. The distribution version of the film was released in Ukraine on 27 February 2020 by Multi Media Distribution (MMD) UA.

== Synopsis ==
Myshko and Lev are men from a Ukrainian village who, for various reasons, find themselves as sailors aboard the Ukrainian Navy warship Cherkasy, stationed in the port of the Crimean Lake Donuzlav, during the events on the Maidan public protests in 2014.

At a time when the crew of the minesweeper Cherkasy is being trained, President Yanukovych is fleeing Ukraine and Crimea is being seized by "little green men." The occupation of the Crimean peninsula begins. The ship returns to base, but the port is already lost. Cherkasy, along with the other ships of the Ukrainian fleet, is blockaded in Lake Donuzlav when the path to the sea is blocked by scuttled ships.

Ukrainian ships surrender one after another. Only the crew of Cherkasy resists and continues a brave, albeit hopeless, fight against the enemy.

== Cast ==
| Actor | Role |
|---|---|
| Yevhen Lamakh | Myshko (Mykhaylo), senior sailor |
| Dmytro Sova | Lev, sailor |
| Roman Semysal | Yuri Fedash, captain of the 3rd rank, ship commander |
| Vadym Lyalko | Midshipman |
| Ruslan Koval | Serhiy, Foreman |
| Yevhen Avdieyenko | Іllya |
| Oleh Shcherbyna | "Hare" |
| Mykhaylo Voskoboynyk | "Sport" |
| Oles Katsion | Cook |
| Maksym Zapisochnyy | Hena, Foreman |
| Serhiy Detyuk | Navigator |
| Dmytro Havrylov | Vadym Boyko, Lieutenant |
| Tymur Aslanov | Senior mechanic |
| Vitalina Bibliv | Mother of Myshko |
| Orest Harda | Father of Myshko |
| Valery Astakhov | Village head |
| Oleksandr Laptiy | Tagir |
| Alexandra Bohna Rodzik | |
| Oleh Karpenko | |

== Shooting ==
In early April, Yuriy Tkachenko, the chairman of the Cherkasy regional state administration, said that in April 2017, the Odesa region would continue shooting a film about the minesweeper Cherkasy. Officially, filming of the events on Donuzlav began on 18 April 2017, off the coast of Ochakiv and Kinburn Spit. For filming, the scene of the sunken Russian ships with which the invaders blocked the way of the Cherkasy was recreated. Instead of the actual minesweeper Cherkasy, which Russia never returned to Ukraine, the Ukrainian fleet tug Korets was used for filming. Yuri Fedash, the real-life commander of the Cherkasy, was the military consultant for the film.

The scenes with pro-Russian appearances in Crimea were shot in Odesa. Filming was also carried out in a village in Chernihiv Oblast.

== Budget ==
The total budget of the film was about 40 million hryvnias, of which the support of Goskino was about 17.3 million. The rest of the budget was provided by the navy of the armed forces of Ukraine of the Odesa and Chernihiv regions. In February 2019, the creators collected 350 thousand hryvnias for post-production (200 thousand was collected on the crowdfunding platform biggggidea, as well as 150 thousand hryvnias, which were added by the International Renaissance Foundation).

== Release ==
Initially, it was planned that the film would be released on 24 August 2018 on the Independence Day of Ukraine, but it was postponed to 2019.

The Ukrainian premiere of the festival version of the film took place on 16 July 2019 at the Odesa International Film Festival 2019, where the film competed in the section "National films — full-length." On 15 October, the film was premiered internationally at the Warsaw Film Festival 2019, where it competed in the main competition.

The wide release distribution version of the film was released in Ukraine on 27 February 2020, by the distributor MMD UA.

On 14 October 2020, Day of the Defenders of Ukraine, the TV premiere version of the film took place in Ukraine on the TV channel "1 + 1."
