= Donuzlav (air base) =

Airport in Crimea

- Myrnyi, Crimea; Near Myrnyi in Ukraine
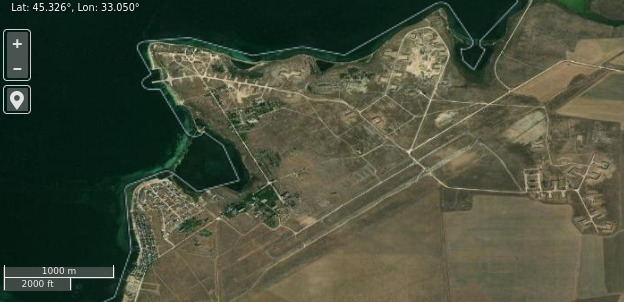
- Satellite imagery of Donuzlav air base

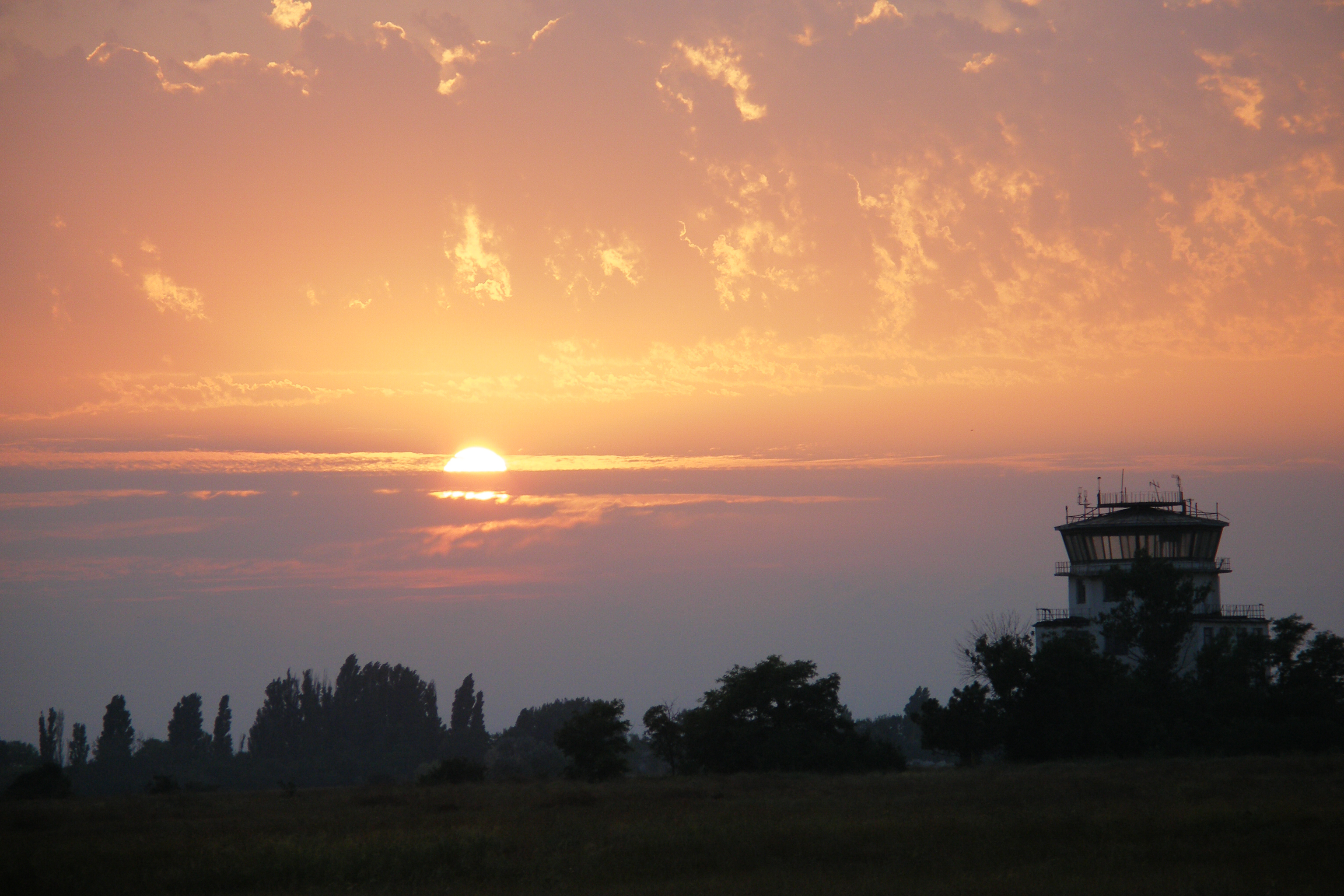
- The former air traffic control tower of the air base

Site information
- Type: Air Base
- Operator: Russian Air Force (allegedly)
- Controlled by: Russian Armed Forces

Location
- Shown within Crimea Shown within Ukraine
- Coordinates: 45°19′32″N 33°03′01″E

Site history
- In use: 1941 - 1995; 2022 - present (allegedly)

Airfield information
- Identifiers: IATA: none, ICAO: XKFD
- Elevation: 11 metres (36 ft) AMSL
Runways
Direction	Length and surface
04R/22L	2,000 metres (6,562 ft) Concrete

Donuzlav is an air base near Lake Donuzlav in Crimea, Ukraine. The air base was decommissioned in 1995, but has been claimed to have been revived by the Russian military since the Russo-Ukrainian war.

== History ==
In 1941, after the outbreak of the Soviet-German War, the Soviet military began to use Donuzlav air base and complement the seaplanes that were already operating on Lake Donuzlav. Throughout the war, the 119th Marine Reconnaissance Regiment was mainly responsible for operating the air base.

In 1958, the 307th Separate aviation squadron operated Ka-15 helicopters on the air base, which later became the 872nd Separate Aviation Helicopter Regiment.

In December 1959, the 270th Separate Naval Long-Range Reconnaissance Squadron was formed as part of the Black Sea Fleet and stationed at the air base.

In September 1969, the 78th Separate Anti-Submarine Helicopter Regiment and stationed at the air base.

In 1995, the General Staff of the Navy disbanded the 318th Separate Anti-submarine Long-Range Aviation Regiment, and relocated a remnant 327th Separate Anti-Submarine Squadron to Kacha Air base. Donuzlav air base was decommissioned afterwards.

=== Russo-Ukrainian War ===
In the months leading up to the Russian invasion of Ukraine, with some as early as April 2021, there were media reports of satellite images revealing military equipment amassed on the air base. This included over 50 helicopters packed onto the airfield, with some even parking on dirt lots.
