= Ukrainian landing ship Konstantin Olshansky =

Project 775-class large landing ship launched 1985

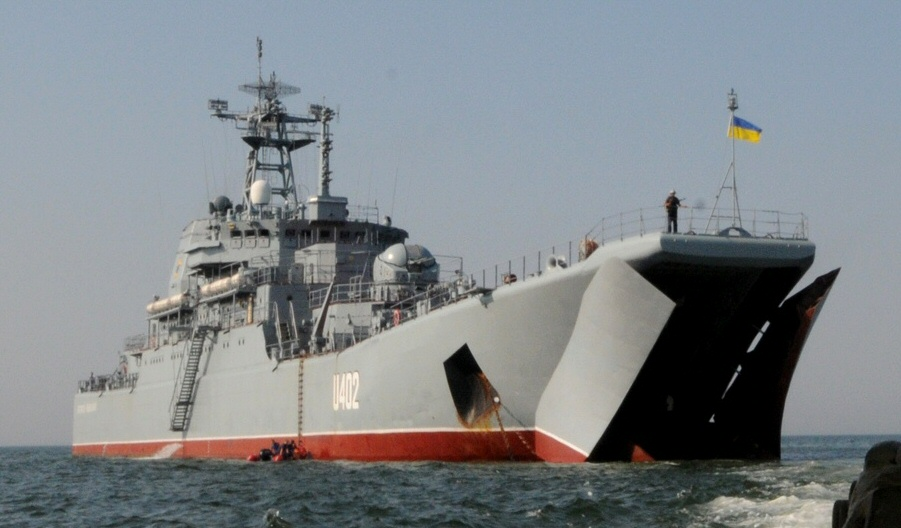
- Konstantin Olshansky

History

→ Soviet Union → Russia
- Name: Konstantin Olshansky
- Namesake: Konstantin Olshansky
- Builder: Stocznia Północna, Gdańsk, Poland
- Commissioned: 1985
- Home port: Sevastopol
- Identification: 112 (1985); 139 (1987); 154 (1990).
- Fate: Transferred to Ukrainian Navy in 1996

Ukraine
- Name: Konstantin Olshansky
- Acquired: 10 January 1996
- Commissioned: 27 March 1996
- Home port: Donuzlav
- Identification: Pennant number: U402
- Captured: 24 March 2014 by Russia
- Status: Unknown
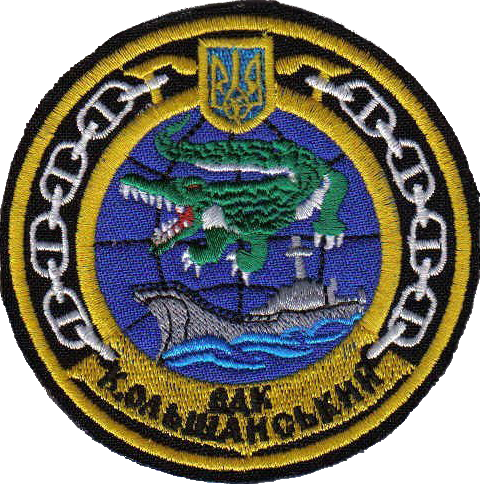
- Badge

General characteristics
- Class & type: Ropucha-class landing ship
- Displacement: 2,768 long tons (2,812 t) standard; 4,012 long tons (4,076 t) full load
- Length: 112.5 m (369 ft 1 in)
- Beam: 15.01 m (49 ft 3 in)
- Draught: 4.26 m (14 ft 0 in)
- Ramps: Over bows and at stern
- Installed power: 3 × 750 kW (1,006 hp) diesel generators
- Propulsion: 2 × 9,600 hp (7,159 kW) Zgoda-Sulzer 16ZVB40/48 diesel engines
- Speed: 17.59 knots (32.58 km/h; 20.24 mph)
- Range: 6,000 nmi (11,000 km; 6,900 mi) at 12 knots (22 km/h; 14 mph); 3,500 nmi (6,500 km; 4,000 mi) at 16 knots (30 km/h; 18 mph)
- Endurance: 30 days
- Capacity: 10 × main battle tanks and 340 troops or 12 × BTR APC and 340 troops or 3 × main battle tanks, 3 × 2S9 Nona-S SPG, 5 × MT-LB APC, 4 trucks and 313 troops or 500 tons of cargo
- Complement: 98
- Armament: 2 × AK-725 twin 57 mm (2.2 in) DP guns; 4 × 8 Strela 2 SAM launchers; 2 × 22 A-215 Grad-M rocket launchers

Konstantin Olshansky (Ukrainian: Костянтин Ольшанський), formerly known as BDK-56 (Russian: БДК-56), is a Project 775 (NATO reporting name: Ropucha-I-class) large landing ship of the Ukrainian Navy. The ship was built in Poland, launched in 1985 and initially served in the Soviet Navy where the vessel was renamed after Soviet Naval Infantry officer Konstantin Olshansky. The landing ship was transferred to Ukraine in 1996. On 24 March 2014, the ship was captured by Russian forces during the annexation of Crimea.

== Service history ==
The ship was built at the Stocznia Północna shipyard in Gdańsk, Poland, and launched in 1985 as BDK-56. In 1990, the ship was renamed to Konstantin Olshansky, after Konstantin Olshansky, a Soviet naval infantry officer.

In mid 1996 during the division of the Soviet Black Sea Fleet, the landing ship was transferred to the Ukrainian Navy, and the Ukrainian naval flag was raised on the ship on 27 March 1996.

In March–April 2011, in the Libyan civil war, Konstantin Olshansky took part in the evacuation of foreign specialists and members of their families from Libya, bringing 193 citizens from 15 different countries to Malta.

On 24 March 2014, the ship was captured by Russian forces during the annexation of Crimea by the Russian Federation, Konstantin Olshansky was seized by Russian soldiers at her pier in the Southern Naval Base.

On 26 March 2024, Ukraine claimed to have struck Konstantin Olshansky with a Neptune missile. The ship was reportedly being refitted for use against Ukraine. On 7 June 2025, Atesh partisan reported that Konstantin Olshansky was being used as a "donor" to supply parts to other ships of a similar type at Sevastopol.

== Gallery ==
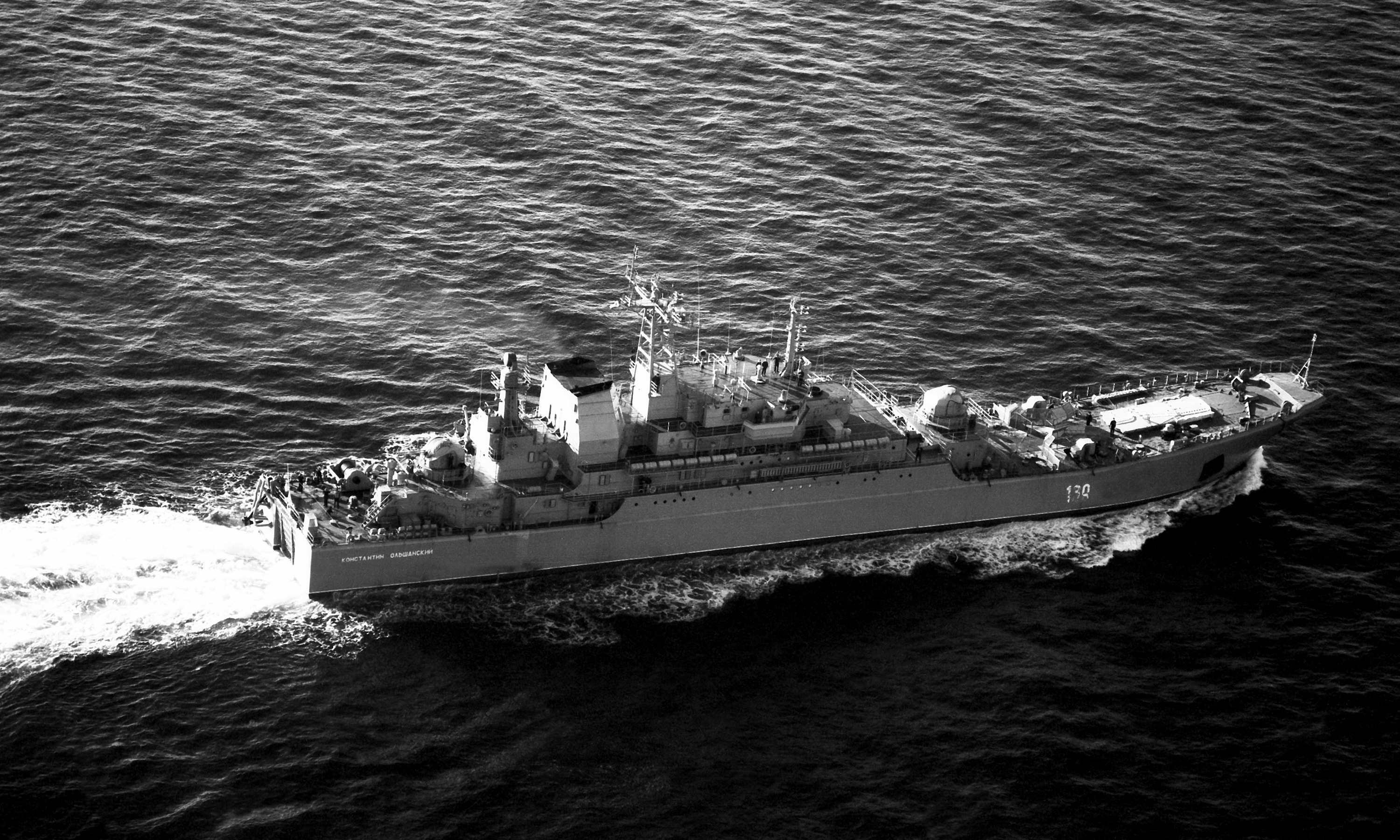
Konstantin Olshansky in 1990

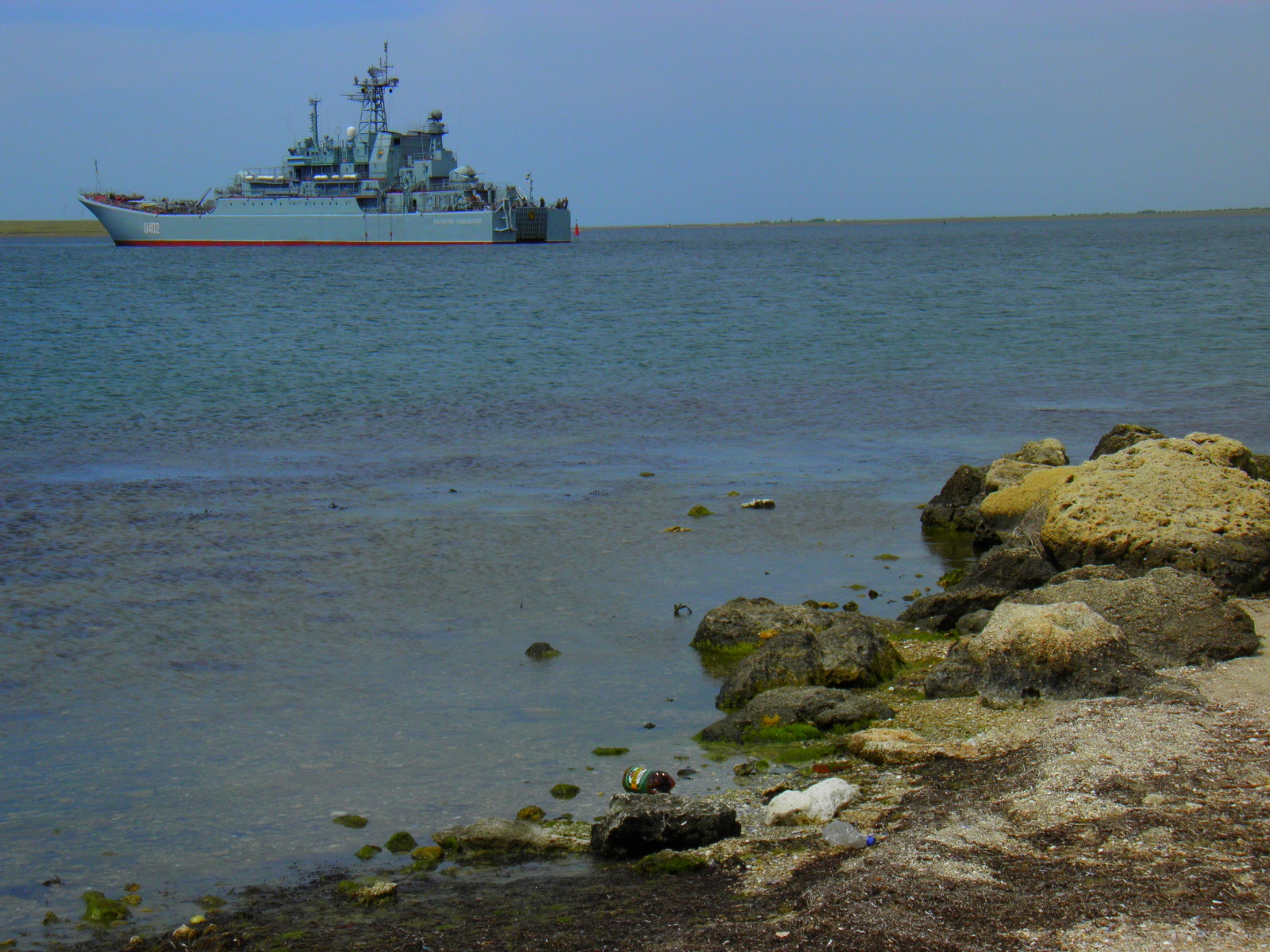
Konstantin Olshansky at Donuzlav in 2011

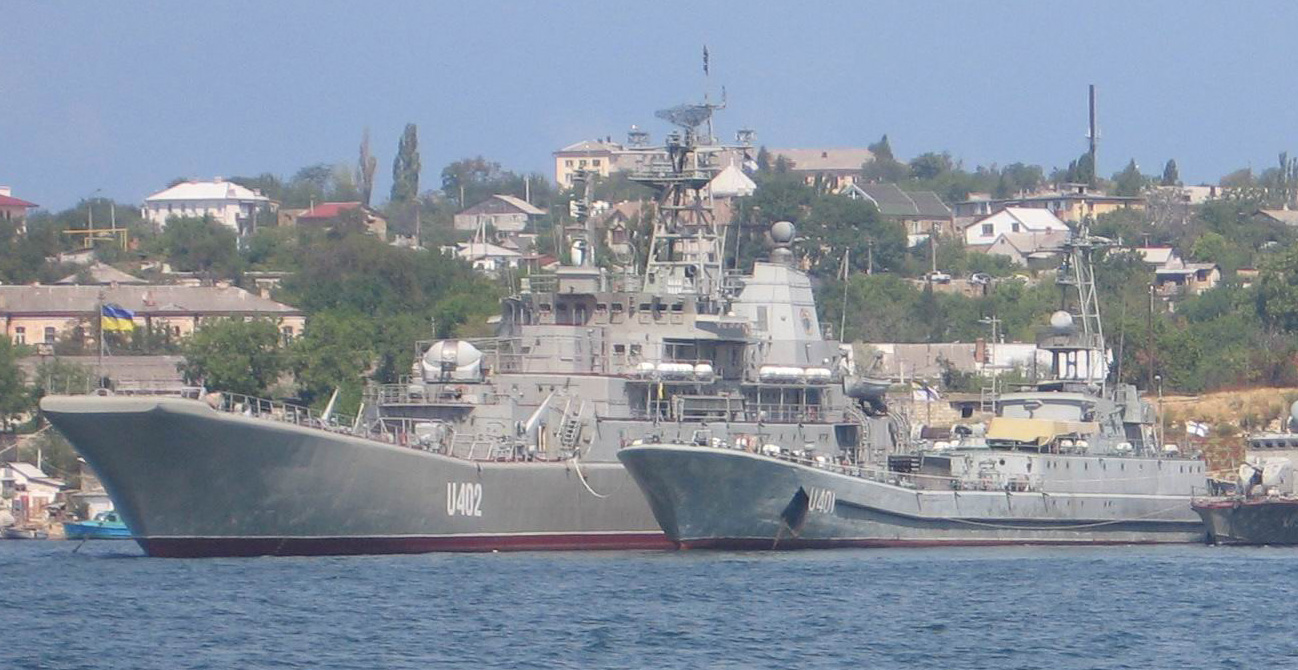
Kostiantyn Olshansky (bigger) and Yuri Olefirenko (smaller) landing ships

== See also ==
- Ukrainian ship Yuri Olefirenko
- List of active Ukrainian Navy ships
