= Russian cruiser Ochakov =

Kara-class cruiser of the Russian Black Sea Fleet

Coordinates: 45.3269°N 32.9857°E

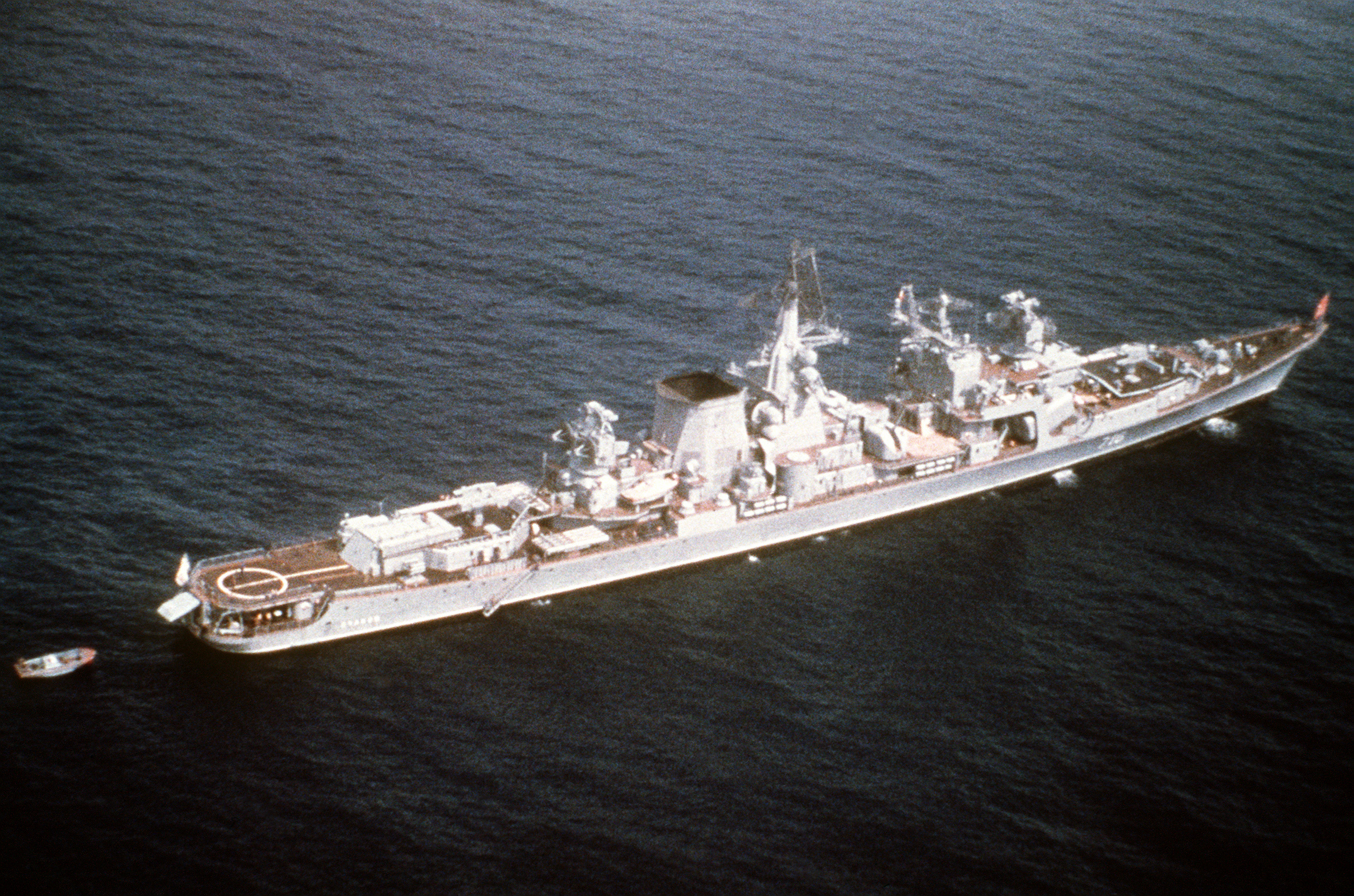
- Ochakov in 1982

History

Russia
- Name: Ochakov
- Namesake: Ochakov
- Builder: 61 Communards Shipyard
- Laid down: 19 December 1969
- Launched: 30 April 1971
- Commissioned: 4 November 1973
- Decommissioned: 20 August 2011
- Status: Laid up, awaiting scrapping

General characteristics
- Class & type: Kara-class cruiser
- Displacement: 8,900 tons
- Length: 173.4 m (568.9 ft)
- Beam: 18.5 m (60.7 ft)
- Draft: 5.4 m (17.7 ft)
- Propulsion: 4 turbine-type generators GTG-12,5A x1250 kW; 1 turbine-type generator GTG-6M 600 kW
- Speed: 32 knots
- Range: 9,000 miles
- Complement: 425
- Armament: 2 quad SS-N-14 Silex anti-submarine missiles; 2 twin SA-N-3 Goblet surface-to-air missile launchers (80 missiles); SA-N-4 Gecko surface-to-air missile launchers (40 missiles); 2 twin 76mm AK-726 dual purpose guns; 4 30mm AK-630 CIWS; 2 × 5 533 mm PTA-53-1134B torpedo tubes; 2 RBU-6000 anti-submarine rocket launchers; 2 RBU-1000 anti-submarine rocket launchers
- Aircraft carried: 1 Kamov Ka-25

Ochakov was a Kara-class cruiser of the Russian Navy Black Sea Fleet. She was decommissioned in 2011 but remained laid-up in Sevastopol, until on 3 March 2014 she was towed and sunk as a blockship in the channel to Donuzlav lake, in Novoozerne, in western Crimea. A few months later she was refloated and returned to Inkerman to await scrapping.

== History ==
Ochakov was laid down in the Soviet Union on 25 December 1969, launched on 30 April 1971, and commissioned in the Soviet Black Sea Fleet on 4 November 1973. The ship was constructed in the 61 Kommunar Shipyard at Nikolayev (Mykolaiv) on the Black Sea. She was in service with the Soviet Fleet until 1991, and then joined its successor, the Russian Navy. In 2000, the ship was laid up for modification and repairs. By 2006, all work on the ship had been halted, and, in 2008, the ship was towed from Sevmorzavod.

On 20 August 2011, the naval flag of Ochakov was hauled down and the ship prepared to be sold for scrap.

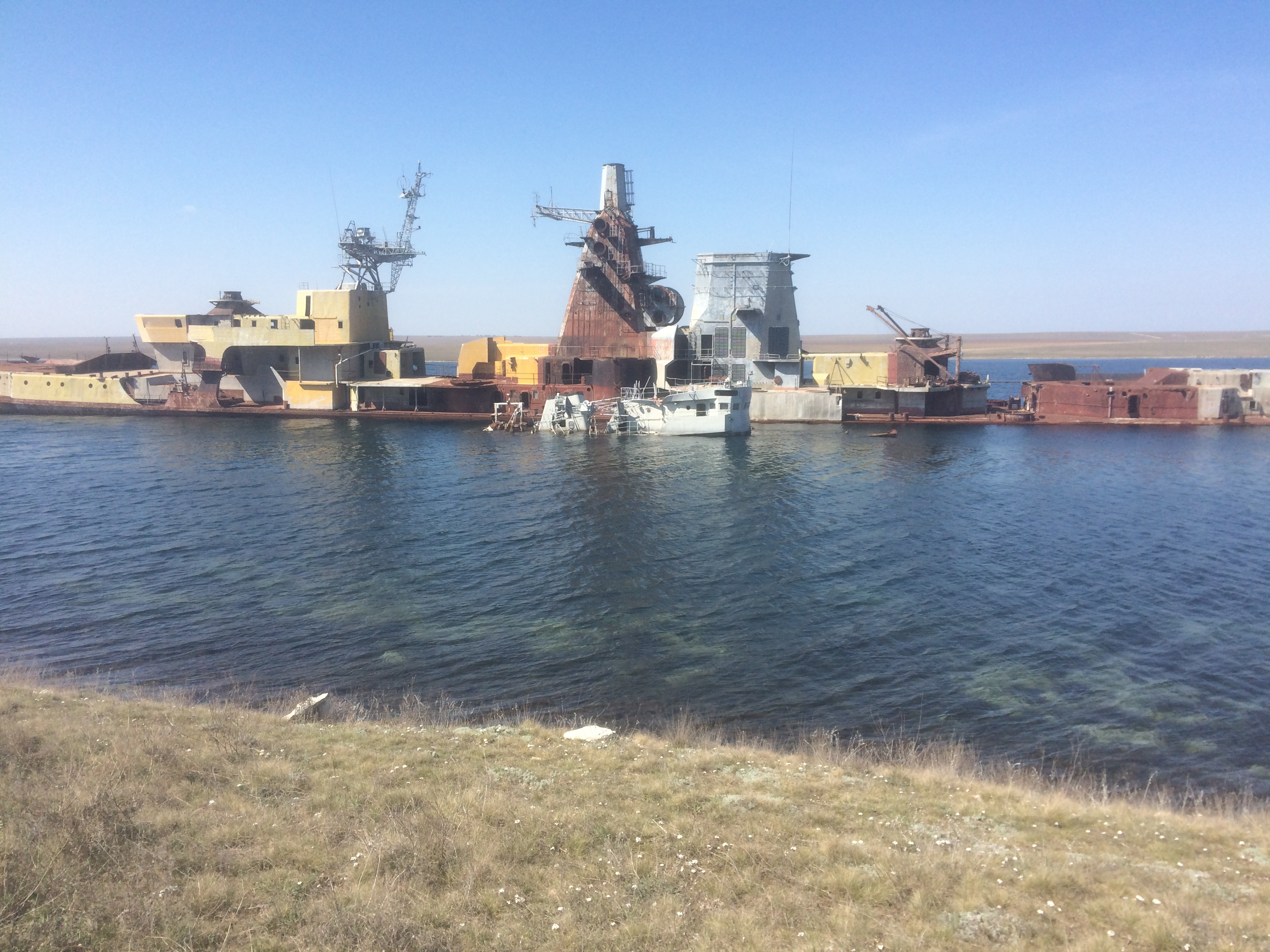
Ochakov in 2017 at the scrapyard.

On 6 March 2014, during the annexation of Crimea by the Russian Federation, Russian sailors scuttled the hull of Ochakov in Donuzlav Lake at the entrance to Donuzlav Bay in western Crimea as a blockship, in an attempt to prevent Ukrainian Navy ships from gaining access to the Black Sea. Trapped in the bay, the Ukrainian squadron based at the Southern Naval Base surrendered without a shot being fired. The Ochakov was refloated several months later, and returned to Inkerman to await scrapping.
