= Yuriy Fedash =

Ukrainian navy captain (born 1980)

Yuri Petrovych Fedash
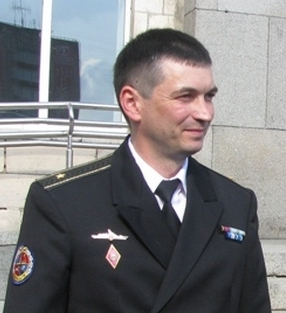
- Native name: Федаш Юрій Петрович
- Born: 25 August 1990 (age 35) Velyki Birky, Ukrainian SSR, Soviet Union
- Allegiance: Ukraine
- Branch: Ukrainian Navy
- Commands: Minesweeper Cherkasy (2012–2014)
- Conflicts: Russo-Ukrainian War: Capture of Southern Naval Base

Yurii Petrovych Fedash (Ukrainian: Федаш Юрій Петрович; born 25 August 1980) is a Ukrainian military sailor and captain of the first rank of the Ukrainian Navy, and former commander of the sea minesweeper Cherkasy. During the occupation of Crimea by Russian troops, the crew of the minesweeper refused to surrender to the Russian occupiers and under his leadership, made repeated attempts to break through Donuzlav which was blocked by the Russians. He was made an honorary citizen of Cherkasy.

== Biography ==
Yurii Fedash born on 25 August 1980 Velyki Birky, Ternopil Raion, Ternopil Oblast, Ukrainian SSR, Soviet Union. He studied at the Sevastopol Naval Institute from 1997 to 2002.

From 2002 to 2006, he served as the commander of the anti-aircraft artillery team on the Kirovohrad amphibious assault ship.

From 2006 to 2014, he continued his service on the minesweeper Cherkasy first as commander of the artillery and mine-torpedo combat unit, then as the assistant commander of the ship, and from 2012 as commander of the ship.

From 2014 to 2016, he served as the chief of staff of the surface ships brigade in Ochakiv, Mykolaiv Oblast.

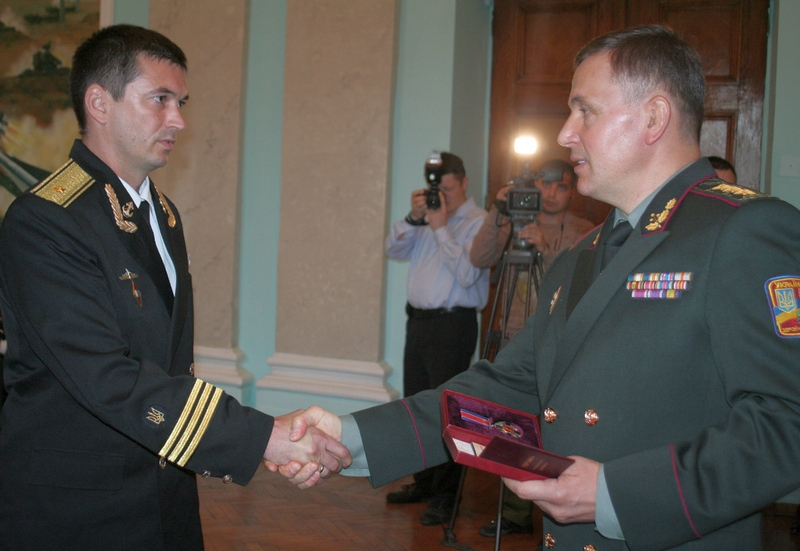
Ukrainian Defense Minister Valeriy Heletey awards Yuriy Fedash with the Order of Danylo Halytsky in 2014

From 2016 to 2017, he was head of the Department of Chief Specialists of the Ukrainian Navy.

Since 2017, is serving as the head of the combat training department of the combat training department of the Ukrainian Navy.

== Breakthrough from Donuzlav ==
Being blocked in Donuzlav by the Russian occupiers who had sunk several old ships at the exit of the bay, the minesweeper Cherkasy on 21 March 2014 attempted to tow the sunken ship to the open sea. According to Fedash, after the expiration of the ultimatum, his ship left Lake Donuzlav to the words of the song "Our proud Varyag does not surrender to the enemy." He reported that:

"Because there was not enough power, the ends began to break, but within an hour we were pulling the ship away. We asked for help from the sea minesweeper Chernigiv so that we could pull the two of us away, to which we were refused... During this time, helicopters were flying up, snipers were around. The situation escalated every minute, we didn't pay attention to it, it didn't scare us."

— Yuri Fedash

On 21 March the minesweeper Cherkasy with its crew, although not in full force, continued to hold the defense. On 23 March the minesweeper Cherkasy made another attempt to break through the blockade on Lake Donuzlav. The ship attempted to pass between two sunken Russian ships and almost succeeded. However, a Russian tugboat approached them, hit the side and ran the bow of the minesweeper Cherkasy aground. On 25 March after a long assault, the ship was captured by the special forces of the Russian Federation, and its captain and crew went ashore.

== Awards ==
- Medal For Military Service to Ukraine: for selfless service to the Ukrainian people, exemplary performance of military duty and on the occasion of the Armed Forces Day.
- Order of Danylo Halytsky, (21 August 2014): for personal courage and heroism, shown in the defense of the state sovereignty and territorial integrity of Ukraine, loyalty to the military oath, and high professional performance of duty.

== Honorary titles ==
- On 27 March 2014, by the decision of the Cherkasy City Council session, Fedash was awarded the title of honorary citizen of the city of Cherkasy.
- On 25 April 2014, the Velyki Birki settlement council adopted a decision awarding Fedash the title of "Honorary Citizen of the Velyki Birki settlement."

== See also ==
- Russo-Ukrainian War
- Annexation of Crimea by the Russian Federation
- Capture of Southern Naval Base
