= Southern Naval Base =

Former Armed Forces of Ukraine naval base in Novoozerne, Crimea

- Novoozerne, Yevpatoria, Autonomous Republic of Crimea, Ukraine
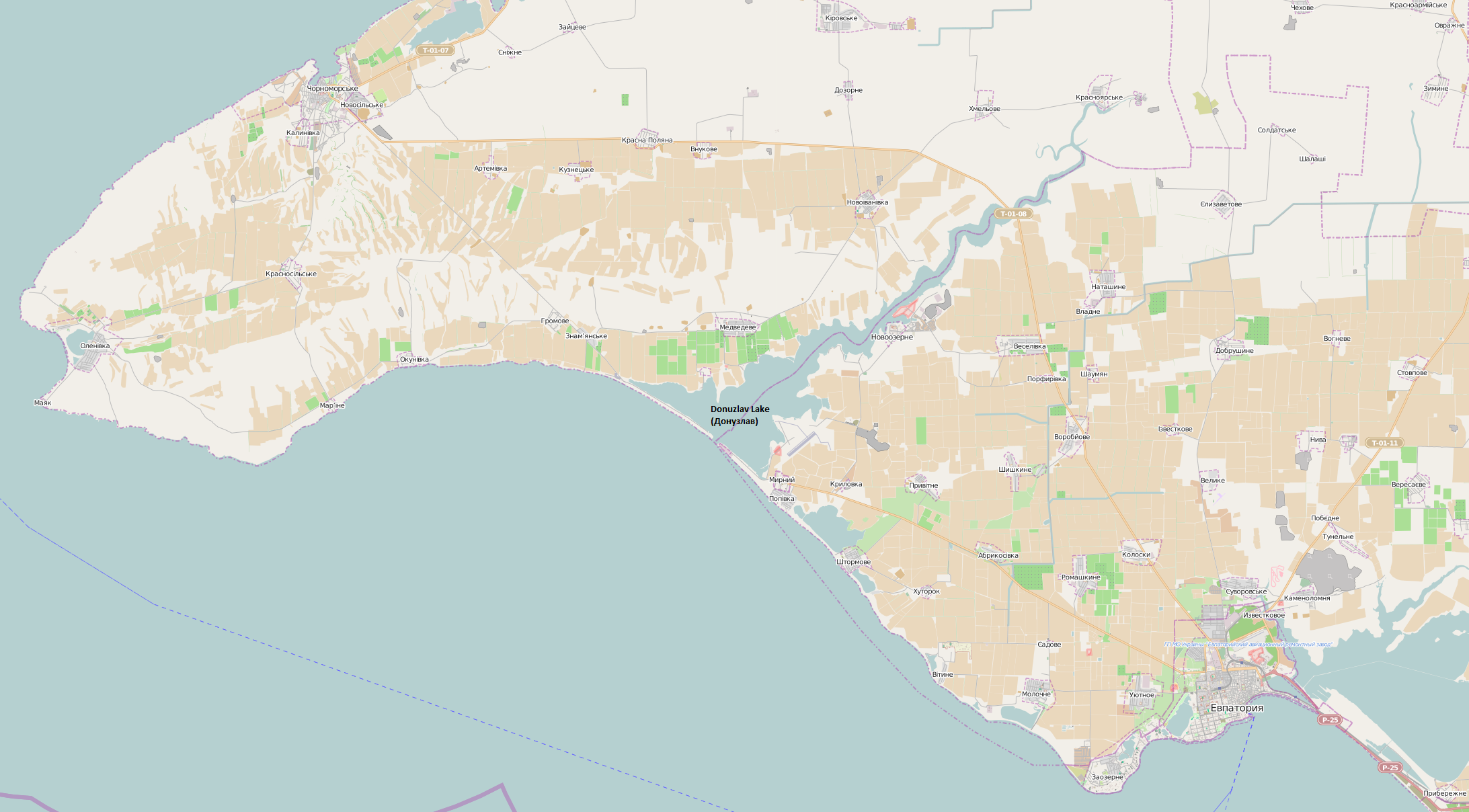
- Map of Donuzlav Lake

Site information
- Type: Naval base
- Owner: Ukraine
- Controlled by: Russia

Location
- Location within Crimea
- Coordinates: 45°23′51″N 33°7′42″E

Site history
- In use: 1996-2014

Southern Naval Base (Ukrainian: Південна військово-морська база, Russian: Южная военно-морская база) was a naval base of the Armed Forces of Ukraine located in the town of Novoozerne (part of Yevpatoria city municipality) on Donuzlav Bay in the western part of Crimea.

The base was reorganized in place of the Crimean Naval Base of the Soviet Union which completely occupied the southern shores of Donuzlav Bay and included hovercraft berths, Donuzlav Air Station, and a submarine base. Most of the former base is disassembled, while the former Donuzlav Air Station is non-operational.

Donuzlav Bay is separated from the Black Sea by two sandspits which serve as a small freight port of the Yevpatoriya Commercial Trade Port located in the city.

== History ==
The naval base was established by Ukraine in 1996, having previously been a Soviet naval base from 1976 to 1991, and then a Russian base. It celebrated its 15th anniversary in 2011.

=== Capture by Russia ===
In connection with the events of social and political instability that led the Ukraine government to resignation on 28 January 2014, Russian parliament authorized the deployment of Russian military troops on Ukrainian soil with the official mandate of protection for Russian native population living in Crimea. These actions violated the treaties of 1997 and are qualified as an act of aggression according to Article 3(e) of United Nations General Assembly Resolution 3314 (XXIX) on the Definition of Aggression of 1974:

The use of armed forces of one State which are within the territory of another State with the agreement of the receiving State, in contravention of the conditions provided for in the agreement or any extension of their presence in such territory beyond the termination of the agreement.

=== Naval blockade ===
During the night between 5 and 6 March 2014 ships of the Russian Black Sea Fleet, led by the Slava-class cruiser Moskva sank the decommissioned Russian Kara-class cruiser Ochakov and the rescue tugboat Shakhter at the entrance to Donuzlav Bay as blockships to prevent the Ukrainian fleet stationed at the Southern Naval Base from reaching the open sea. The following day the decommissioned diving support vessel BM-416 was also scuttled in the bay entrance. Trapped in the bay, the Ukrainian squadron surrendered without a shot being fired. The Ochakov was refloated several months later, and returned to Inkerman to await scrapping.

The surrendered Ukrainian ships included the corvette Vinnytsia, minesweepers Chernigov, Cherkasy and Genichesk, medium landing ship Kirovograd, large landing ship Konstantin Olshansky, fire boat Evpatoria, transport Gorlovka, tugboats Kovel and Novoozernoe, patrol boat Feodosia, and torpedo boat Kherson.
