= Yevpatoria Municipality =

Yevpatoria City Municipality Євпаторійська міськрада
- Municipality
- Flag Coat of arms

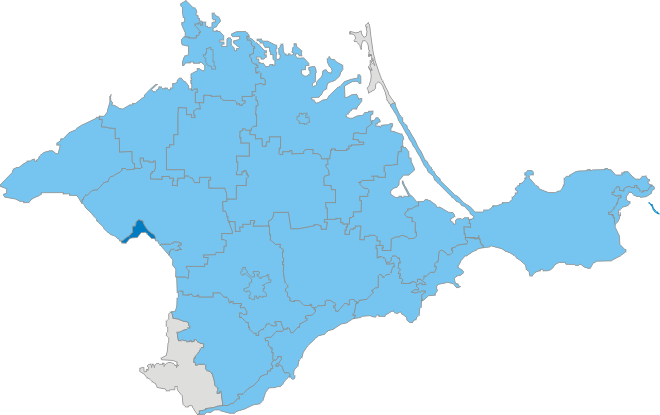
- Location of the municipality (dark blue) in Crimea
- Coordinates: 45°12′13″N 33°21′41″E
- Country: Ukraine (de jure); Russia (occupied by)
- Republic: Crimea
- Established: February 11, 1963
- Admin. center: Yevpatoria
- Subdivisions: List: 1 cities; 3 towns; 0 villages

Government
  - City Mayor: Andriy Danylenko

Area
  - Total: 65 km^{2} (25 sq mi)

Population (2013)
  - Total: 119,258
  - Density: 1,800/km^{2} (4,800/sq mi)
- Time zone: UTC+3 (MSK)
- Dialing code: +380 6569
- Website: evp.rk.gov.ru

The Yevpatoria City Municipality (Ukrainian: Євпаторійська міськрада, translit. Yevpatoriis'ka mis'krada) is one of the 25 regions of the Autonomous Republic of Crimea, a territory recognized by almost all countries as part of Ukraine but occupied by Russia as the Republic of Crimea. The region is located on the western coast of Crimea on the Black Sea's shore. Its administrative center is the city of Yevpatoria. Population: 119,258 (2014 Census).

== Name ==
The Yevpatoria City Municipality is also known by its two other native official names; in Russian as Evpatoriyskiy gorsovet (Евпаторийский горсовет), and in Crimean Tatar as Kezlev şeer şurası. Colloquially, the municipality is known as "the territory governed by the Yevpatoria City Council (Ukrainian: Євпаторійська міська рада).

== History ==
The Yevpatoria City Municipality was formed on February 11, 1963 when the territory of the Yevpatoria Raion was absorbed into the already existing Saky Raion. At that time, the Yevpatoria municipality was established with the city of Yevpatoria governing the territory. The municipality was reestablished on May 1, 1990.

== Demographics ==
The Yevpatoria City Municipality's population was 117,565 as of the 2001 Ukrainian Census and 123,505 as of April 1, 2013.

The region's nationality composition results of the 2001 census was as follows:

- Russians—64.9 percent
- Ukrainians—23.3 percent
- Crimean Tatars—6.9 percent

All of the other nationalities took up the remaining 4.9 percent.

== Administrative and municipal status ==
Within the framework of administrative divisions of Russia, Yevpatoria is, together with a number of urban and rural localities, incorporated separately as the town of republican significance of Yevpatoriya—an administrative unit with the status equal to that of the districts. As a municipal division, the town of republican significance of Yevpatoriya is incorporated as Yevpatoriya Urban Okrug.

Within the framework of administrative divisions of Ukraine, Yevpatoria is incorporated as the town of republican significance of Yevpatoria. Ukraine does not have municipal divisions.

Besides the city of Yevpatoria which serves as the region's administrative center, the Yevpatoria municipality also includes three urban-type settlements:

- Myrnyi, a remote enclave on the Black Sea's coast surrounded by Saky Raion
- Novoozerne, inland remote enclave surrounded by Saky Raion
- Zaozerne, situated by the Black Sea's coast near Yevpatoria

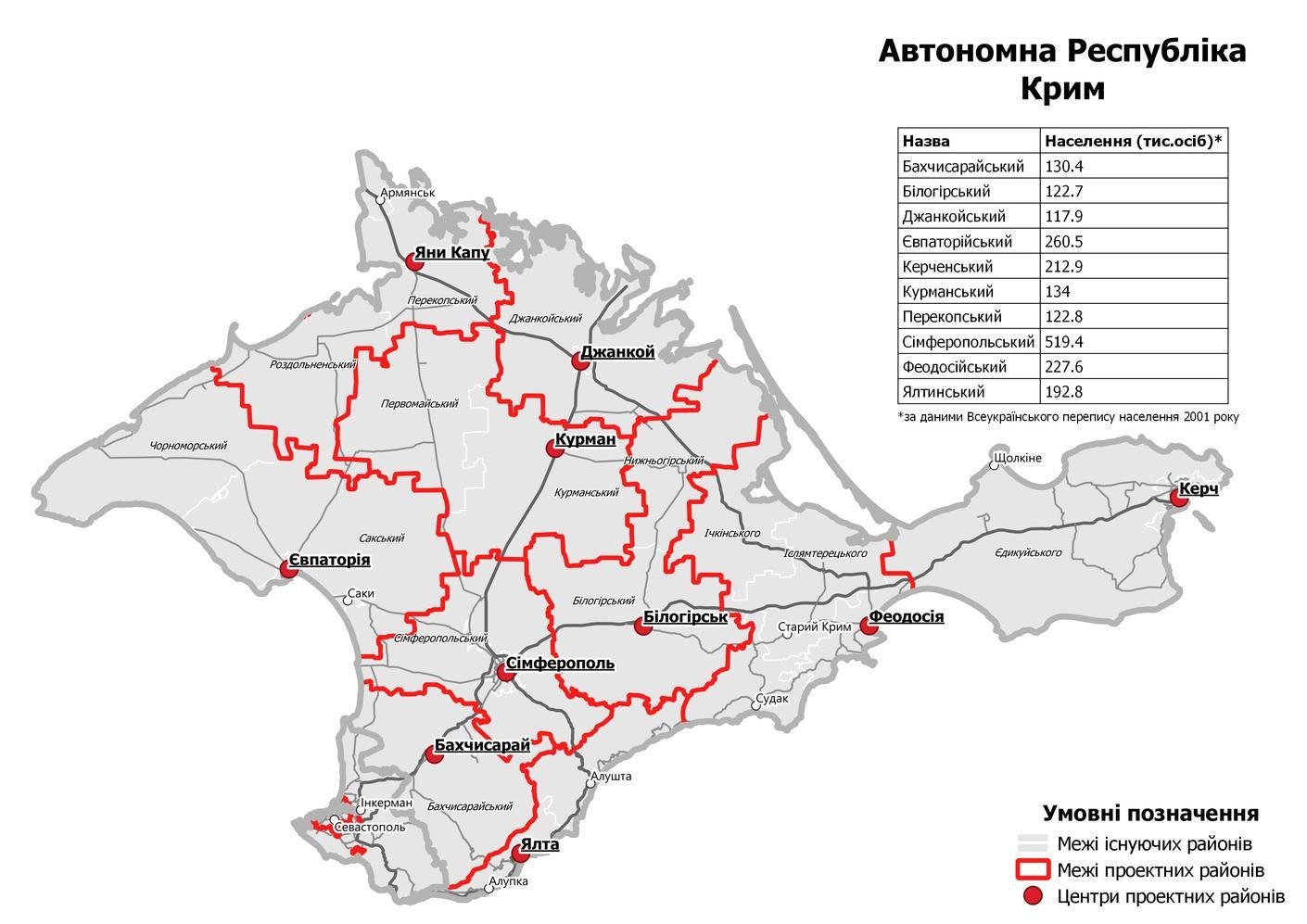
In July 2020, the Verkhovna Rada approved an administrative reform in Crimea

== 2020 Ukrainian Administrative Reform ==
In July 2020, Ukraine conducted an administrative reform throughout its de jure territory. This included Crimea, which was at the time occupied by Russia, and is still ongoing as of October 2023. Crimea was reorganized from 14 raions and 11 municipalities into 10 raions, with municipalities abolished altogether.

Yevpatoria Municipality was abolished, and its territories to become a part of Yevpatoria Raion, but this has not yet been implemented due to the ongoing Russian occupation.
