= Donuzlav =

Bay in Crimea

- Донузлав, Doñuzlav
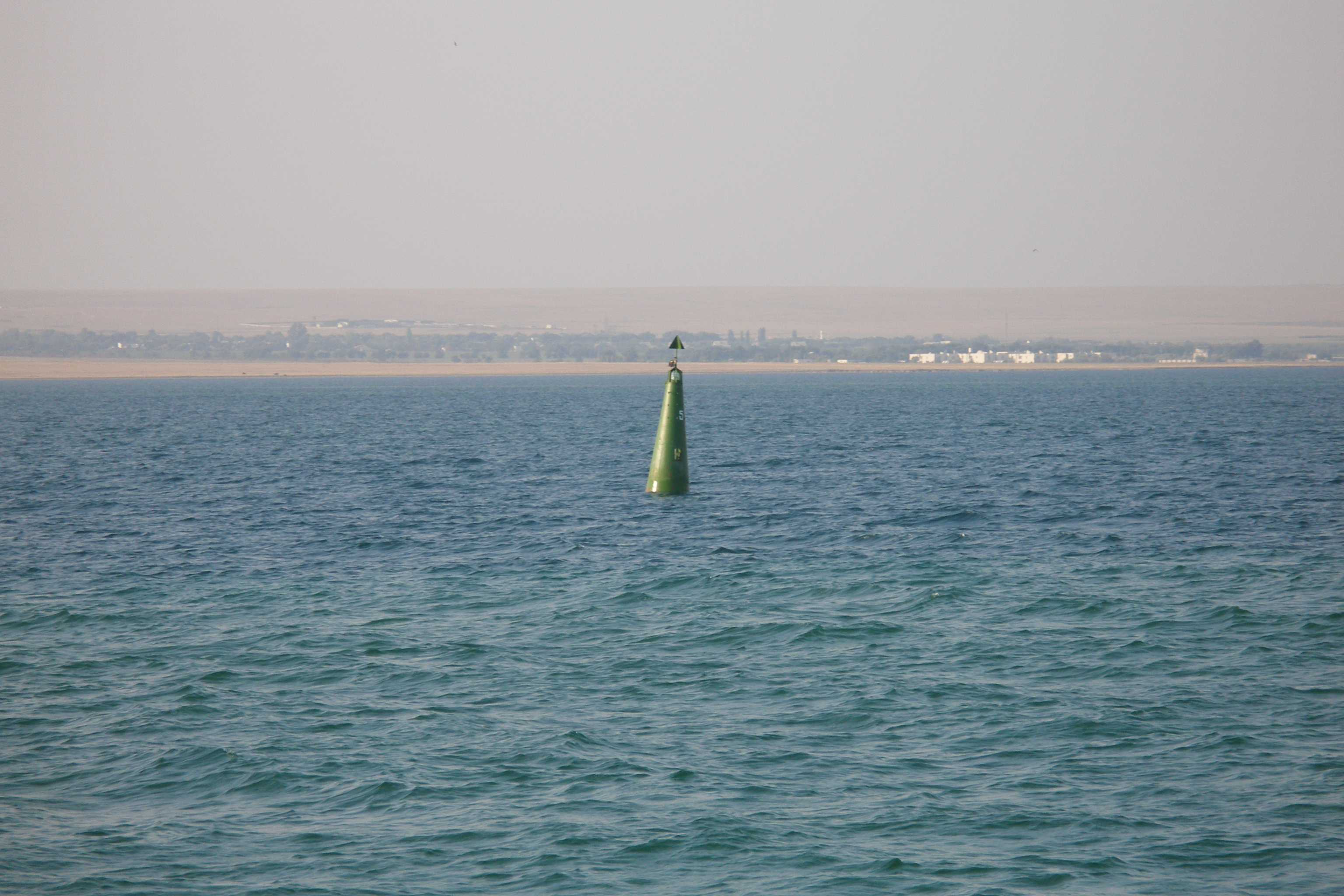
- Donuzlav Lake near Novoozerne

- Location within Crimea
- Location: Crimea
- Coordinates: 45°20′24″N 33°00′36″E

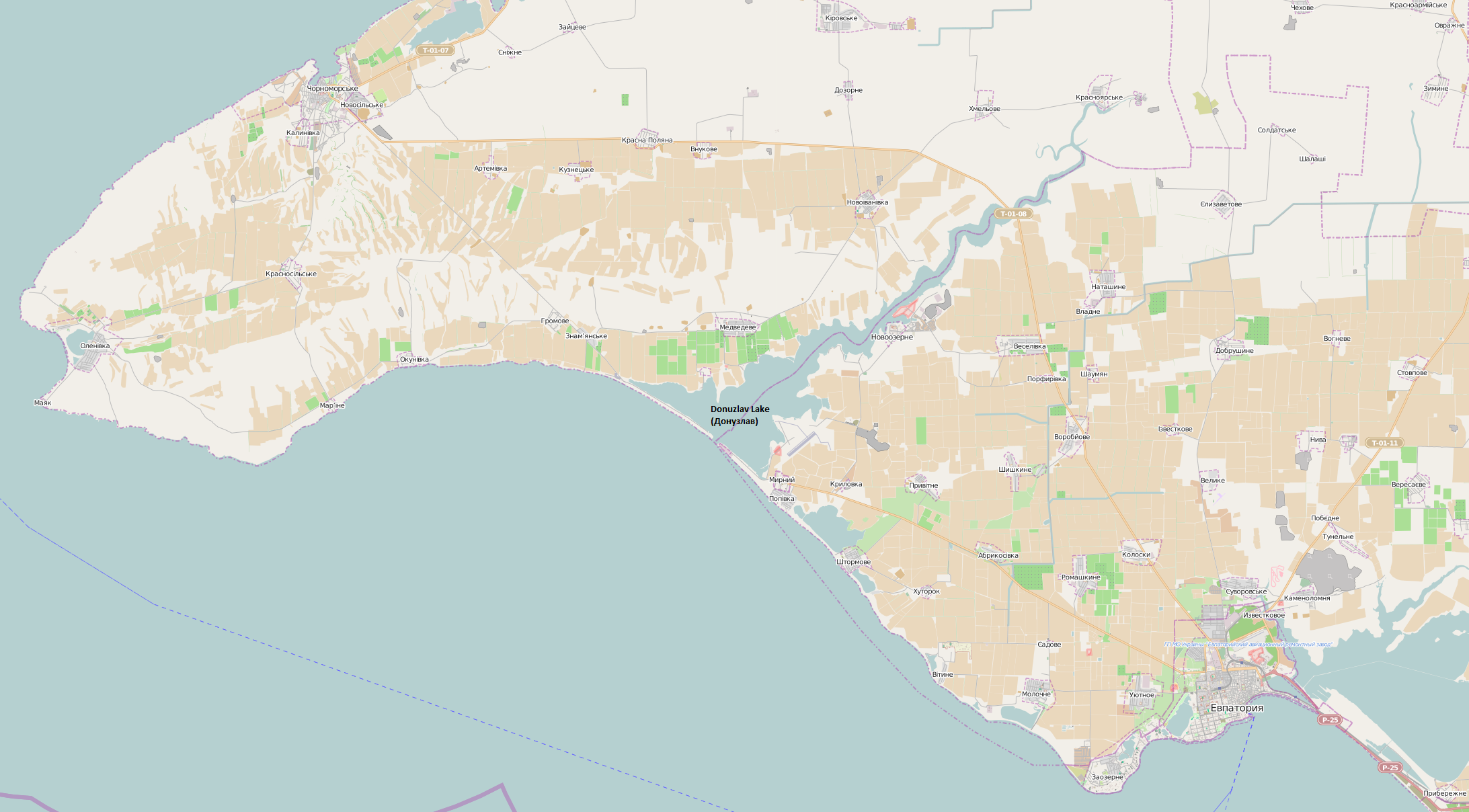
Donuzlav Lake on the map

Lake Donuzlav (Russian and Ukrainian: Донузлав, Crimean Tatar: Doñuzlav), also referred to as Donuzlav Bay, is the deepest lake of Crimea (27 m, 89 ft) and biggest in Chornomorske Raion (47 km^{2}, 18 sq mi). It is a protected landscape and recreational park of the Autonomous Republic of Crimea.

The lake is as salty as the sea near its mouth but bottom springs make the water much less saline near the head.

== Overview ==
Technically it is no longer a lake but rather a bay since 1961, when a 200-metre width canal was washed through the sandy peresyp separating it from the Black Sea, when the construction of a Soviet naval base started. The peresyp length is about 12 km (7.5 mi) with widths varying between 0.3 km (980 ft) to 1 km (3,300 ft).

Donuzlav is located in Chornomorske and Saky raions (districts) at the Tarkhankut Peninsula as well as Yevpatoria Municipality. Donuzlav is one of several lakes located around the peninsula.

The length of Donuzlav is 30 km (19 mi), its width is up to 8.5 km (5.3 mi), it covers an area of 42 km^{2} (16 mi^{2}) and its depth is up to 27 m (89 ft). It has several small bays. Banks are high, steep, and winding. At separate parts of the lake, a wetland vegetation is common (featuring common reed, cattail, and others).

In the upper portion of the lakes are located two dams for fish farming; in the mid portion is a naval base. On the banks there is a wind-powered energy station (Sakska Wind Farm) with 53 wind turbines.

Several gulches (semi-dried streams) lead to the lake, among which are Staryi Donuzlav, Donuzlav, Chernushka, and Burnuk.

The Donuzlav recreational park, with an area of 2,335 hectares, is in the northern part.

=== Settlements ===
- Novoozerne, Yevpatoria Municipality
- Myrnyi, Yevpatoria Municipality
- Ozerivka, Chornomorske Raion
- Krasnoyarske, Chornomorske Raion

== Military bases ==
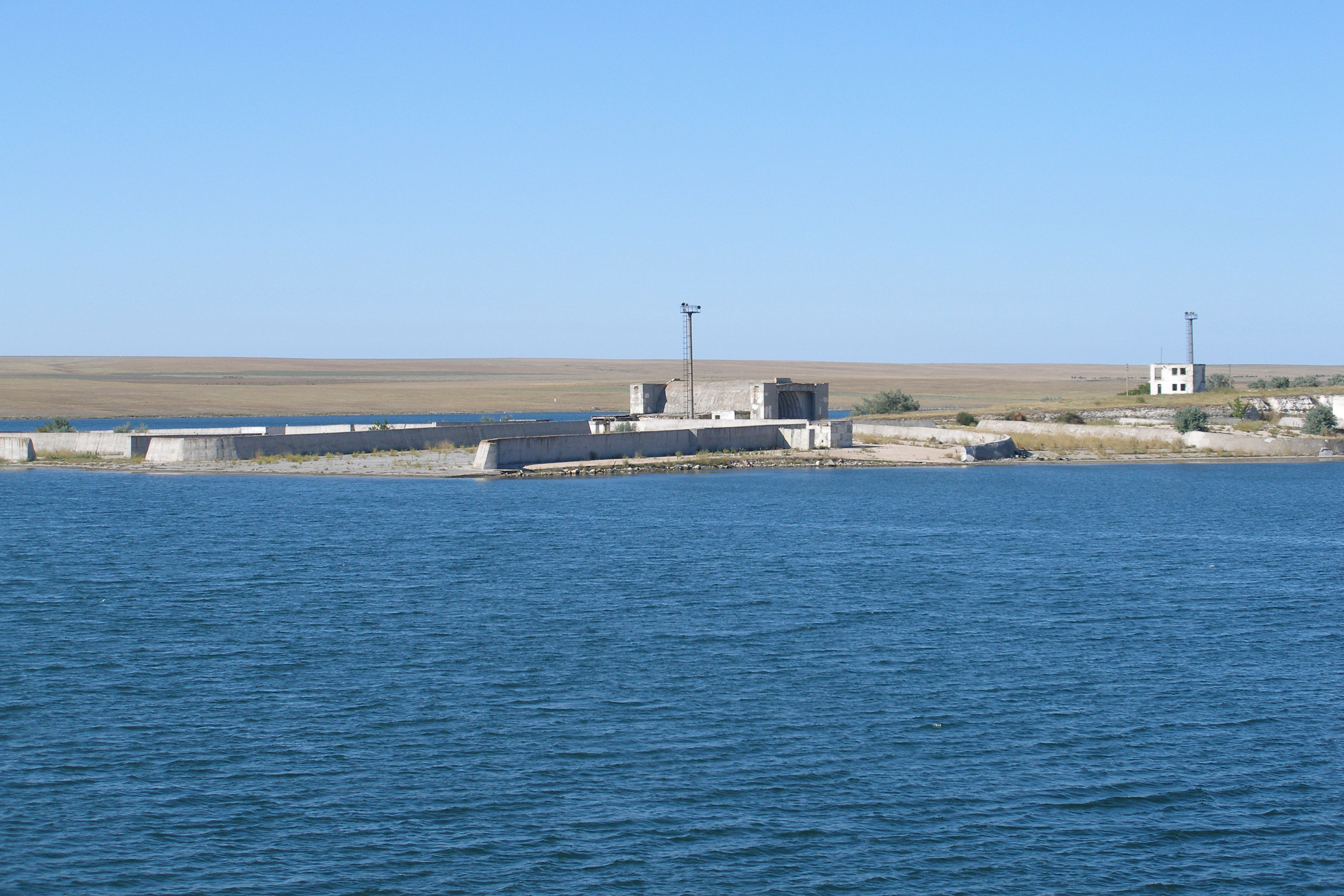
A mooring site of anti-submarine amphibious seaplanes and fighter ships of the naval base, 2006

Donuzlav was the location of the Crimean Naval Base of the Soviet Union. The base was particularly notable for housing air-cushioned landing craft (Zubr class). After the dissolution of the Soviet Union it was converted into the Southern Naval Base of Armed Forces of Ukraine.

On 5 March 2014, during the annexation of Crimea, Russian sailors scuttled two Russian Black Sea Fleet vessels, the anti-submarine ship Ochakov and the rescue tugboat Shakhter, at the entrance to Donuzlav Bay to prevent Ukrainian Navy ships from accessing the Black Sea and established the Russian naval base there, reinstating its previous name.

Early on 1 February 2024, Ivanovets, a Russian Tarantul-class corvette, was sunk in Lake Donuzlav after an attack by surface drones.

The Soviets also established the Donguzlav air base near the lake. It was decommissioned in 1995, but has been reused by the Russian military since the Russo-Ukrainian war.

== See also ==
- Cherkasy, a film
