= Ukrainian minesweeper Chernihiv =

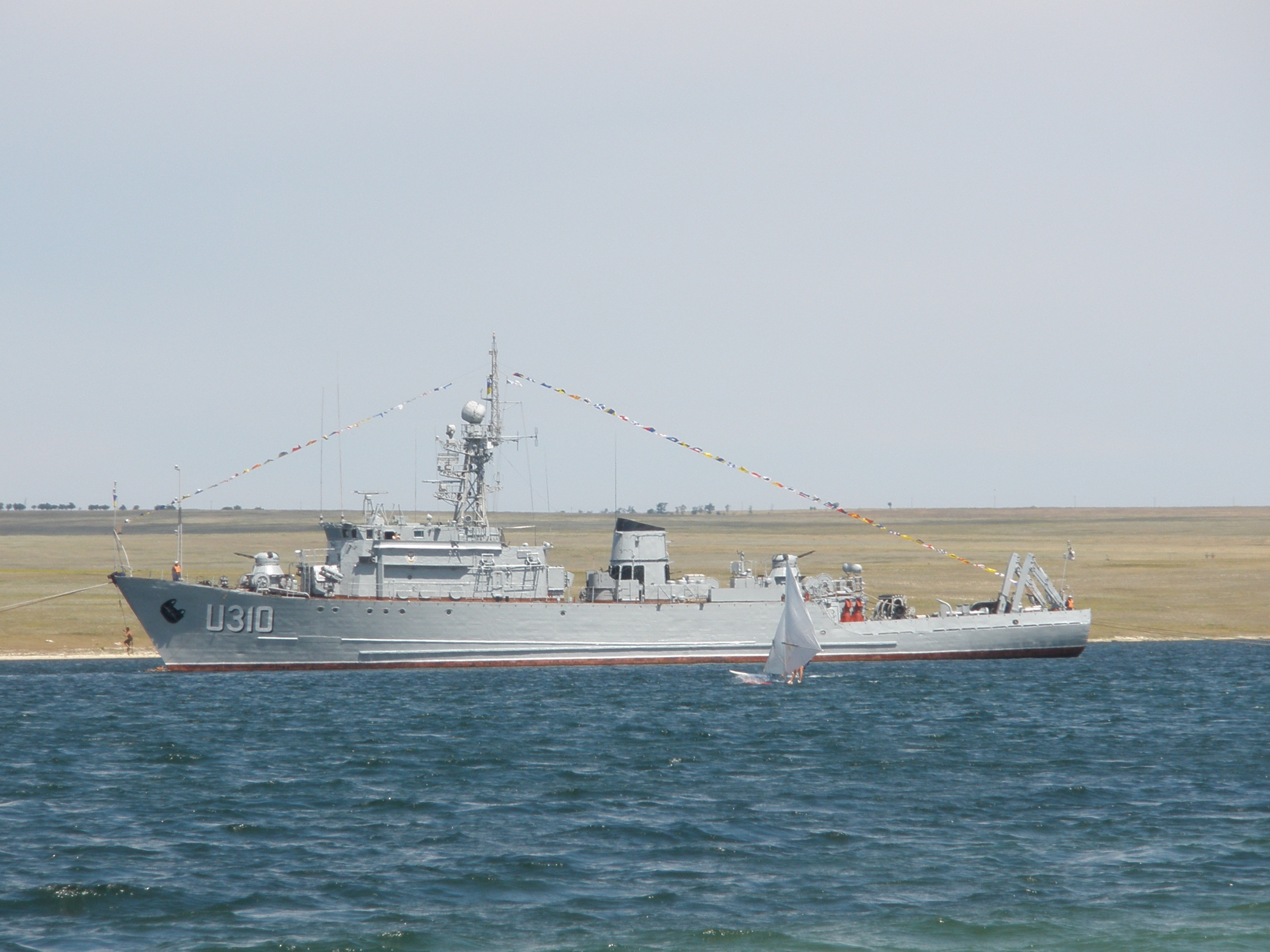

History

Soviet Union
- Name: Zenitchik
- Builder: Sredne Nevskiy SS3 Shipyard
- Yard number: 928
- Completed: 1974
- Commissioned: 1974
- In service: 1974
- Out of service: July 25, 1997

Ukraine
- Name: Zhovti Vody; Chernihiv
- Namesake: Battle of Zhovti Vody; Chernihiv
- Operator: Ukrainian Navy
- In service: July 25, 1997
- Renamed: 1997; June 18, 2004
- Identification: Pennant number: U310
- Captured: by Russia in 2014
- Status: Held in custody by Russian authorities
- Badge

Russia
- Acquired: captured from Ukraine in 2014

General characteristics
- Class & type: Natya-class minesweeper
- Displacement: 873 tons
- Length: 61 m (200 ft 2 in)
- Beam: 10.2 m (33 ft 6 in)
- Draught: 3.6 m (11 ft 10 in)
- Propulsion: Diesel
- Speed: 17 knots (31 km/h; 20 mph)
- Range: 1,500 nmi (2,800 km; 1,700 mi) at 12 knots (22 km/h; 14 mph)
- Complement: 68 (6 officers)
- Armament: 2 х twin 30 mm AK-230 guns; 2 х twin 25 m 2М-3М; 2 х quintuple RBU 1200; 7 AMD-1000 naval mines or 32 depth charges; Underwater mine searcher MKT-210; Trawlers BKT, AT-3, TEM-4

Chernihiv (U310) was a Natya-class minesweeper of the Ukrainian Navy captured by the Russian Navy when the Black Sea Fleet seized Ukraine's Southern Naval Base, during the 2014 annexation of Crimea.

== History ==
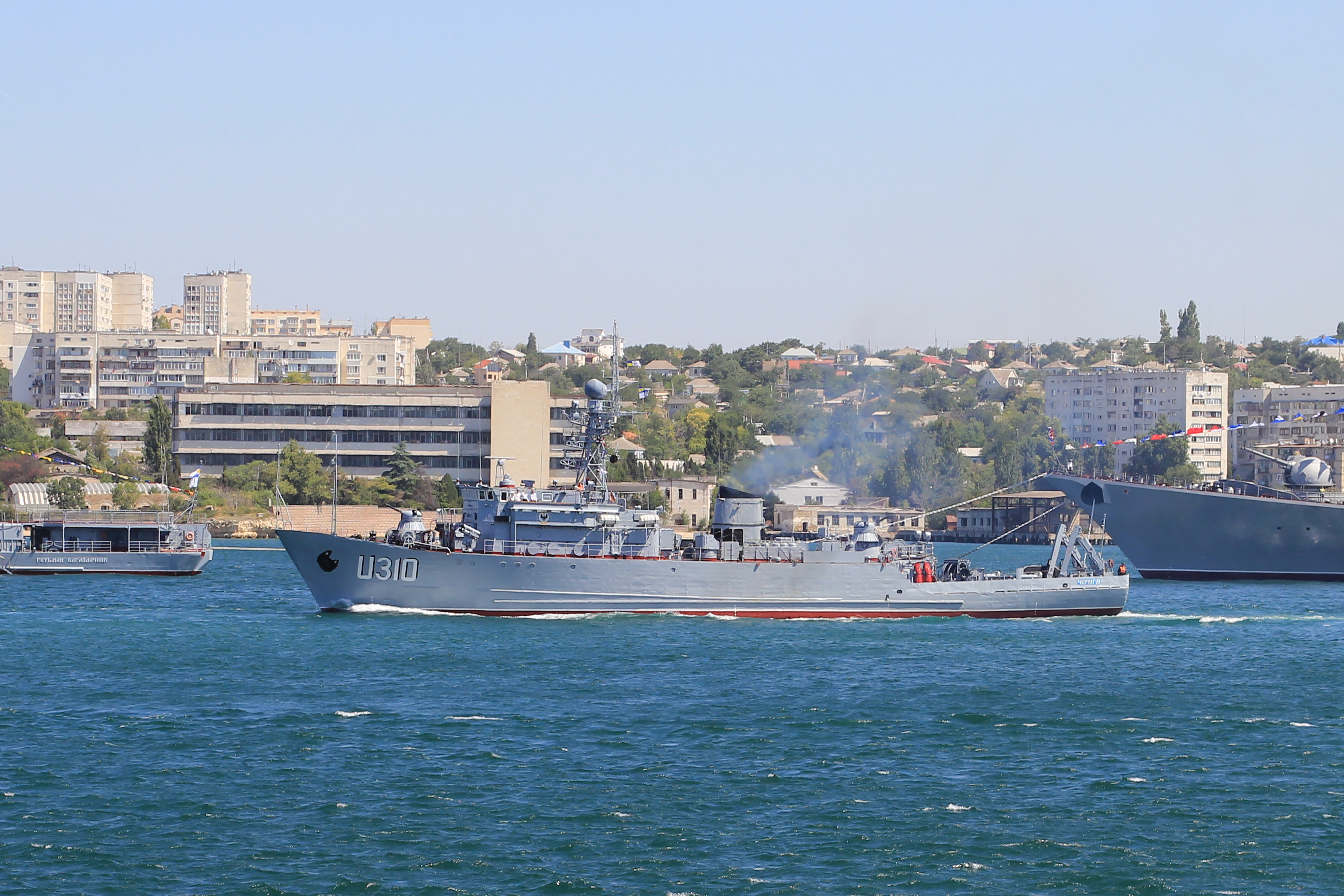
Chernihiv in 2012

Minesweeper Zenitchik was built in the Sredne-Nevskiy SS3 shipbuilding yard in Leningrad in 1974. The ship was deployed on combat tours in Persian Gulf, Red Sea and the Atlantic between 1977 and 1988.

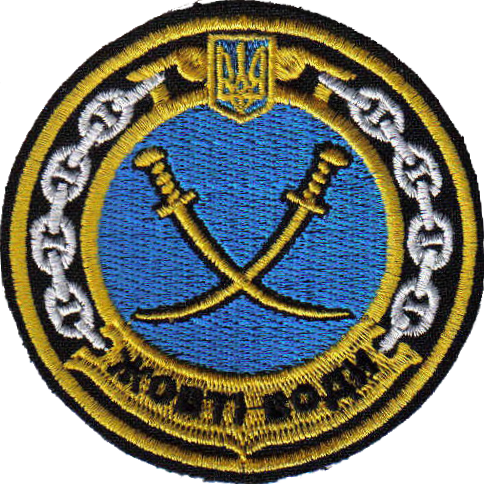

During the partition of the Black Sea Fleet, the minesweeper was transferred to Ukrainian Navy on July 25, 1997. It was renamed Zhovti Vody (U310), in honor of the Battle of Zhovti Vody. On June 18, 2004 the minesweeper was renamed Chernihiv.
