= Ukrainian corvette Vinnytsia =

Anti-submarine corvette of the Ukrainian Navy

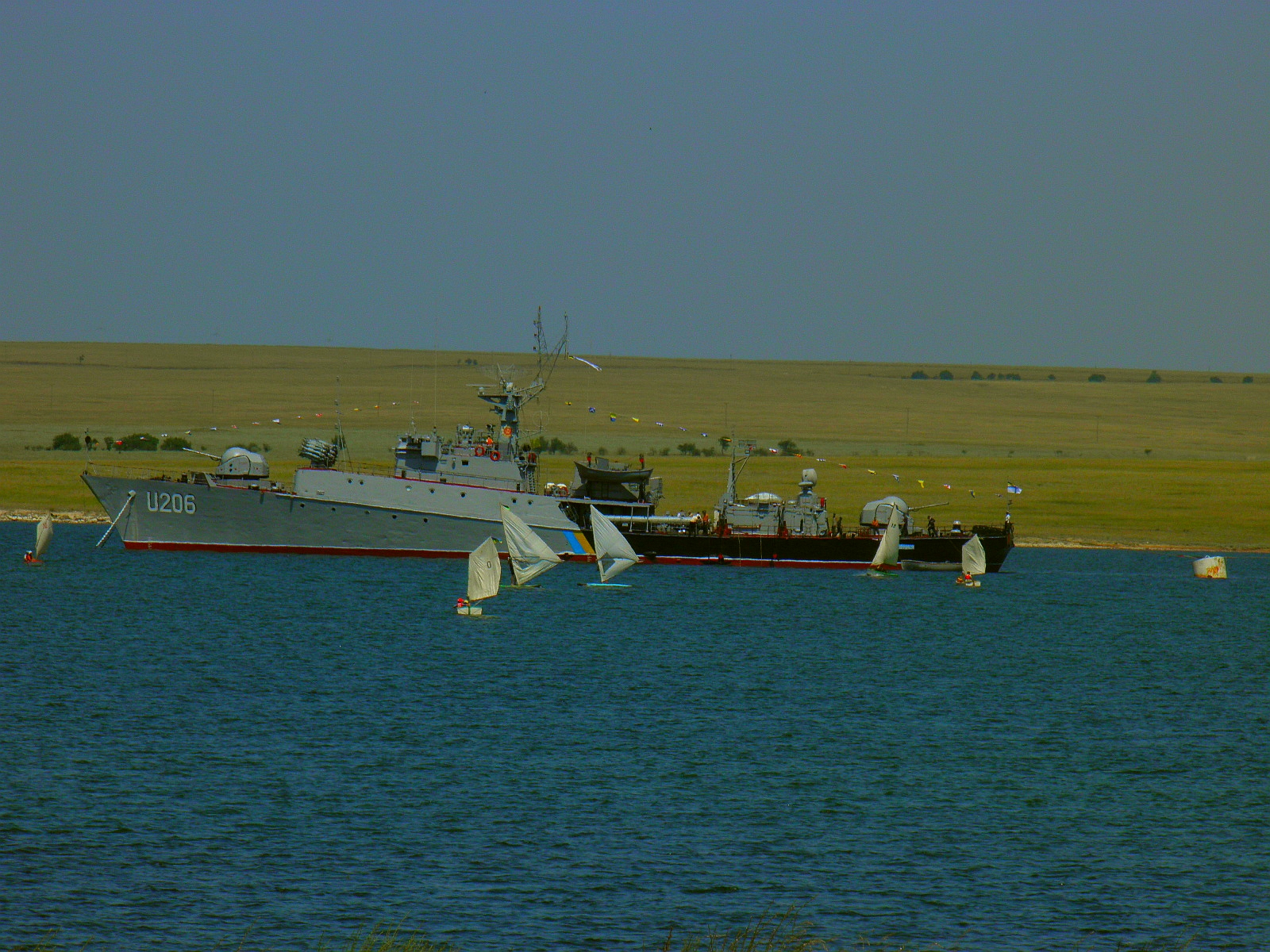
- Vinnytsia in 2011

History

Soviet Border Troops
- Name: Dnepr
- Builder: Zelenodolsk Shipyard, Zelenodolsk, Republic of Tatarstan
- Yard number: 775
- Laid down: 23 December 1975
- Launched: 17 June 1976
- Commissioned: 12 September 1976
- Decommissioned: 29 January 2021
- In service: 31 December 1976 (Coast Guard)
- Fate: Transferred to Ukraine June 1992

Ukraine
- Name: Vinnytsia
- Namesake: Vinnytsia
- Acquired: 1996
- Commissioned: 19 January 1996
- Identification: U206
- Fate: Capsized in the port of Ochakiv on 10 June 2022
- Badge

General characteristics
- Class & type: Grisha II-class corvette
- Displacement: standard 830 tons, full load 990 tons
- Length: 71.2 m (233 ft 7 in)
- Beam: 10.1 m (33 ft 2 in)
- Draught: 3.8 m (12 ft 6 in)
- Propulsion: 3 shaft, 2 × М-507А cruise diesels, 28,000 kW (38,000 shp), (2 shafts); 1 × М-8М boost gas turbine 13,000 kW (18,000 shp), (1 shaft); Electric Plant: 1×DG-500 (500 kW), 1×DG-300 (300 kW), 1×DG-200 (200 kW)
- Speed: 35 knots (65 km/h; 40 mph)
- Range: 2,500 nautical miles (4,600 km; 2,900 mi) at 14 knots (26 km/h; 16 mph)
- Endurance: 9 days
- Complement: 79 (9 chiefs)
- Sensors & processing systems: Radar: MR-302 Rubka air/surface search radar; MR-1031 AK-725 fire control radar; Don-2 navigation radar; Sonar: MGK-322T Argun'/Bull Horn low-frequency hull-mounted sonar; MGK-339T Shelon'/Elk Tail medium-frequency through-hull dipping sonar
- Electronic warfare & decoys: Bizan-4B suite with Watch Dog intercept, 2 PK-16 decoy RL
- Armament: artillery: 2×2 57mm AK-725 gun mount (1000 rounds); antisubmarine: 2 twin 533 mm torpedo tubes DTA-5E-1124; 2 RBU-6000 A/S rocket launchers (96 rockets); 2 depth charge racks (12 depth charges); Up to 18 mines in place of depth charges

Vinnytsia (U206) was an anti-submarine corvette of the Ukrainian Navy. Prior to joining the Ukrainian Navy she was a former KGB Border Guard patrol ship named Dnepr. In March 2014, she was seized by Russian soldiers and de facto came under control of the Russian Black Sea Fleet. The ship was returned to the Ukrainian Navy from Crimea on 19 April 2014.

== Class and role ==
Vinnytsia was a 1124P project corvette (NATO reporting name: Grisha II class, Soviet classification: Albatros class Russian: Альбатрос). In Soviet service she was designated as a Border Guard Patrol Ship, modified versions of the naval Small Anti-Submarine Ship design.

The Grisha-class anti-submarine ships were designed to search for and destroy enemy submarines found in coastal areas. They were equipped with a variety of anti-submarine warfare (ASW) weapons. All were fitted with retractable fin stabilizers. The Grisha II class were modified variants built for the border guard between 1972 and 1983. These ships had a second 57-millimetre (2.2 in) gun mounting replacing the SA-N-4 missile system forward.

== Service ==
The corvette Dnepr was laid down on 23 December 1975 at the Zelenodolsk Shipyard, Zelenodolsk, Republic of Tatarstan. The ship was launched on 17 June 1976. The corvette was moved from Zelenodol'sk to the Sea of Azov along the Volga and Don. The corvette was initially based at Sevastopol for trials.

On 24 December 1976, an act was signed adding the ship to the Border Guard Service of USSR. The Soviet Maritime Border Guard flag was raised on the ship on 31 December 1976.

=== Service in the Coast Guard ===
Dnepr saw service throughout the late 1970s and into the 1980s, guarding the state border and the economic zone of the USSR and patrolling off the coast of the Crimean peninsula in the Black Sea.

In 1977, Dnepr patrolled the Black Sea between Zmiinyi Island and the Kerch Strait. In 1978, the ship was assigned to patrol between Odessa Port and Novorossiysk Port. In 1979, her patrol area stretched from Cape Tarkhankut to Novorossiysk Port. In 1980, Dnepr patrolled between Cape Tarkhankut and Ochamchire Port, and in 1981 along the southern coast of Crimea.

In June 1992, after the dissolution of the Soviet Union Dnepr and her sister ship Izmail joined the Coast Guard of the State Border Guard Service of Ukraine.

=== Service in the Ukrainian Navy ===
In late 1995, it was decided to transfer the Grisha-class vessels Dnepr and Izmail to the Naval Forces of Ukraine. The Ukrainian naval flag was raised on the ship on 19 January 1996. Dnepr was renamed Vinnytsia and reclassified as a corvette.

Following her commissioning into the Ukrainian Navy, Vinnytsia participated in many joint training exercises with other nations. In July 1996 Vinnytsia participated in the naval multinational exercise Cooperative Partner—96 off Bulgaria. In August of the same year, the corvette was a participant in the strategic exercise Sea—96, following that up with the naval multinational exercise Classic—96 off Romania.

In April 1998, the ship was among the vessels that took part in a Ukrainian-Russian naval exercise. She spend the better part of 1999 in naval exercises, the highlight being the Ukrainian-Russian naval exercise Farvater Miru—99 (English: Fairway peace—99) in August. In 2000, again the ship participated in naval exercises, including the multinational Cooperative Partner—2000 in June. In 2002 Vinnytsia performed in a multitude of naval exercises including the naval multinational exercise Breeze—2002 and strategic exercise Farvater Forpost—2002. She repeated that a year later in 2003, participating in the naval multinational exercises Breeze—2003, Farvater Miru—2003, Cooperative Partner—2003, Black Sea Partner—2003 and the BLACKSEAFOR Activation. In 2007 the corvette took part in the strategic exercise Artery—2007, Morsky vusol—2007 (English: Nautical knot—2007). Her captain in 2009 was Captain, 3rd rank Alexander Kostyuk.

On 22 March 2014, following the annexation of Crimea by the Russian Federation, Vinnytsia was seized by Russian soldiers at her pier in the Southern Naval Base. Crimean separatist units lined up the crew and gave them the choice of remaining in Crimea and taking the oath of allegiance to the Republic of Crimea or leaving the peninsula. Half of the crew remained in Crimea, and on 19 April the corvette was towed to Odesa after Russia returned seized Ukrainian Navy ships. At Odesa, she became a training ship. By May 2016 the ship's complement numbered less than 30. Due to the need for major repairs and lack of spare parts for the ship, the Ukrainian Navy planned to decommission her in 2017, but the ship remained in service as of May 2016.

In October 2017, the ship was placed in dry dock in order to evaluate her condition. Vice Admiral Ihor Voronchenko, the commander of Ukraine's Navy, commented that despite being over 40 years old the ship may be repaired and continue service as Ukraine's forces desperately need anti-submarine assets in order to counter Russia's growing submarine fleet in the Black Sea region.

In February 2021, it was announced that the Ministry of Defence was going to turn the warship into a floating museum, but details of the plan were unknown at the time. Russian media falsely claimed that the ship was captured by Russian forces at Berdyansk during the 2022 Russian invasion of Ukraine. However, the ship was later sighted as capsized in the port of Ochakiv.
