= Novoozerne =

Novoozerne Новоозерне
- Urban-type settlement
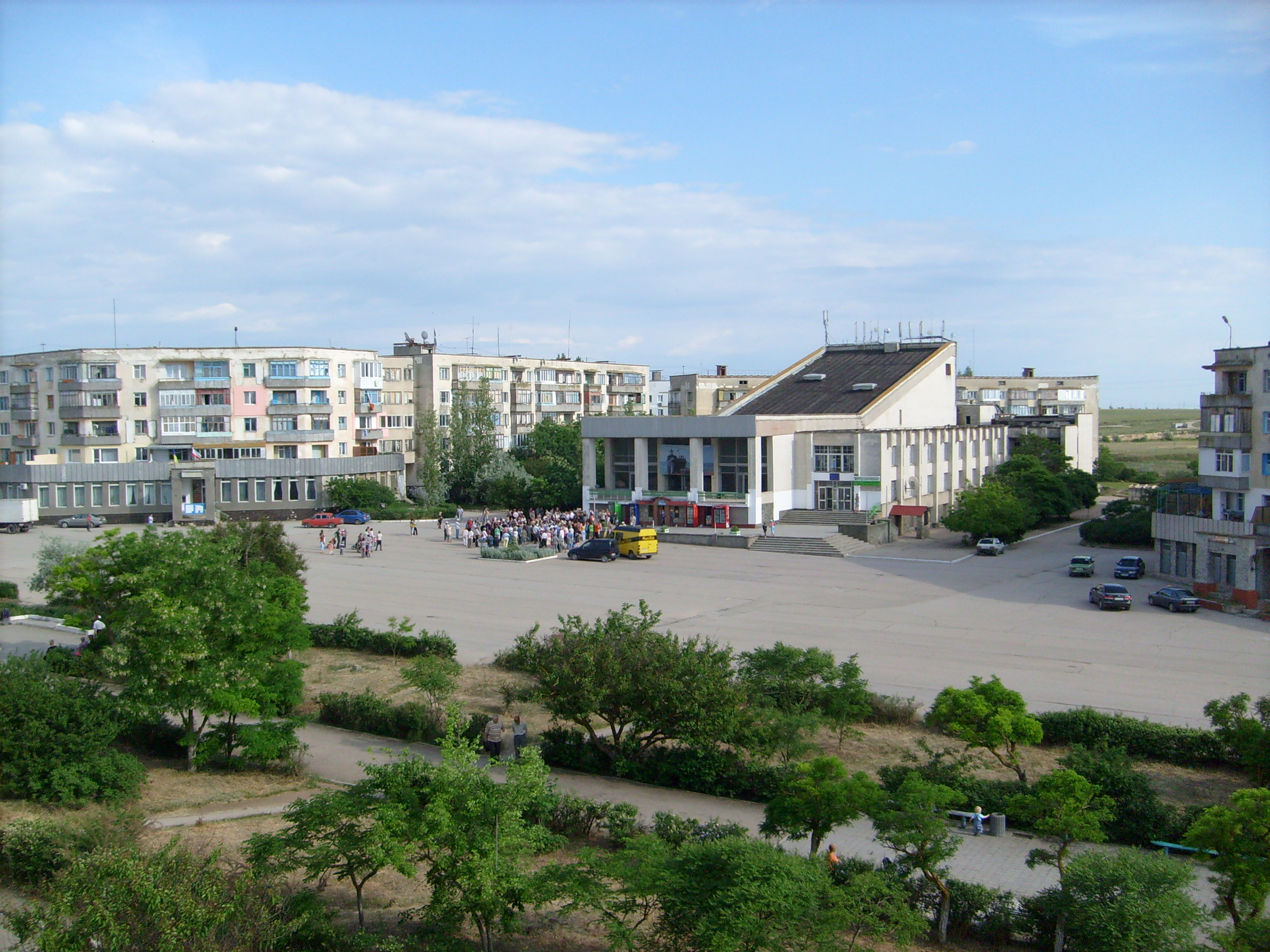
- View of Novoozerne's city center

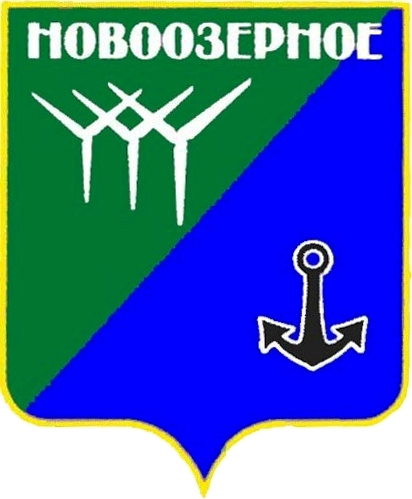
- Coat of arms

- Location within Ukraine Location within Crimea
- Coordinates: 45°23′09″N 33°07′04″E
- Country: Disputed; Ukraine, Russia
- Republic: Crimea
- Municipality: Yevpatoria
- Founded: 1971
- Town status: 1977

Area
  - Total: 6.3 km^{2} (2.4 sq mi)
- Elevation: 20 m (66 ft)

Population (2014)
  - Total: 4,998
  - Density: 790/km^{2} (2,100/sq mi)
- Time zone: UTC+4 (MSK)
- Postal code: 97491
- Area code: +380 6569
- Website: http://rada.gov.ua/

Novoozerne (Ukrainian: Новоозерне; Russian: Новоозёрное, romanized: Novoozyornoye; Crimean Tatar: Novoozörnoye) is an urban-type settlement in the Yevpatoria municipality of the Autonomous Republic of Crimea, a territory recognized by a majority of countries as part of Ukraine and since 2014 occupied and incorporated by Russia as the Republic of Crimea. Population: 4,998 (2014 Census); 6,108 as of the 2001 Ukrainian Census, and 7,242 in 2011.

The settlement was founded in 1971. It received the status of an urban-type settlement in 1977.

== See also ==
- Southern Naval Base (Ukraine)
