= Myrnyi =

Myrnyi Мирний
- Urban-type settlement
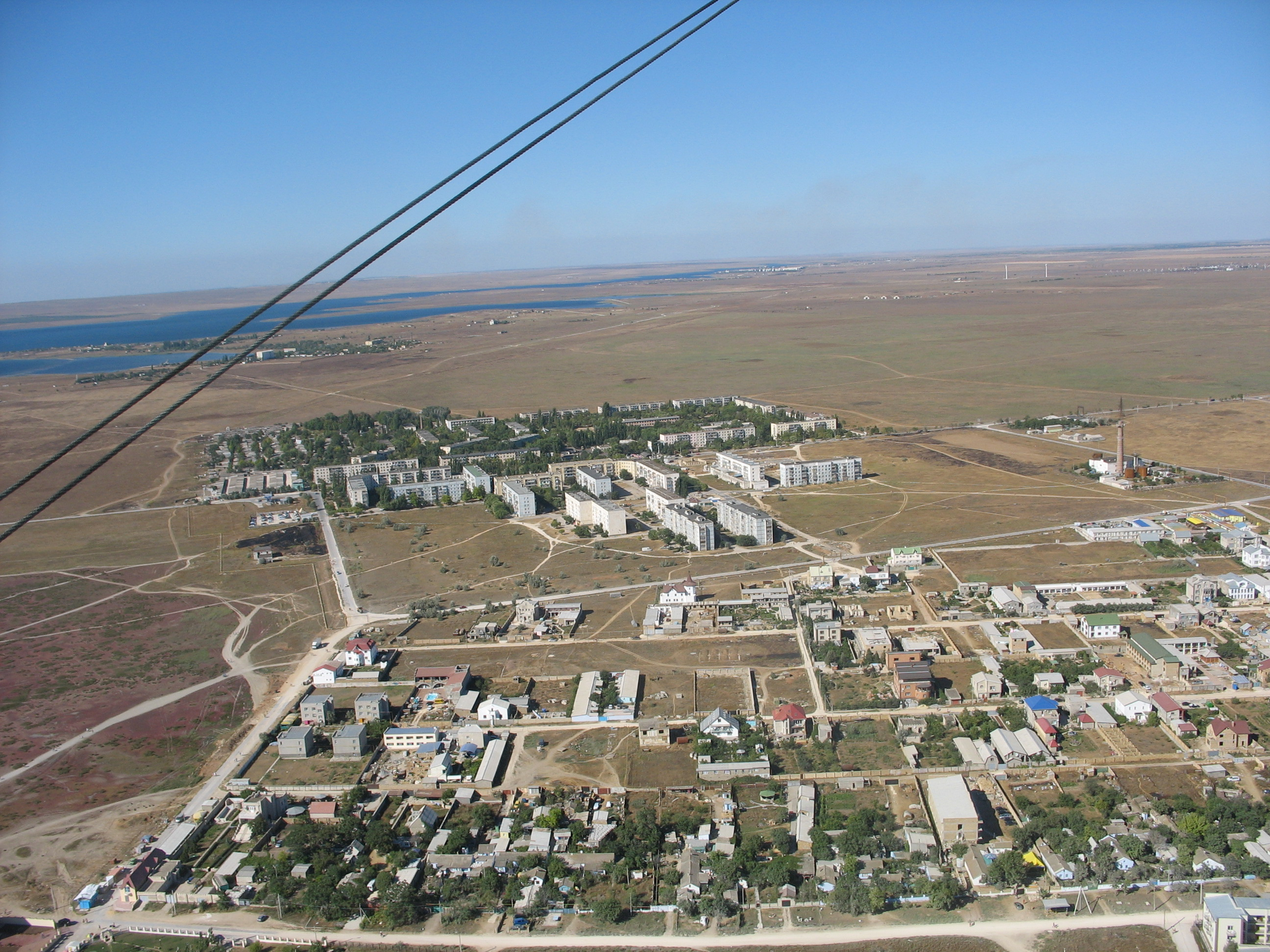
- View of Myrnyi from above

- Flag Coat of arms

- Location of Myrnyi in Crimea
- Coordinates: 45°18′30″N 33°02′03″E
- Country: Ukraine (occupied by Russia)
- Republic: Crimea
- Municipality: Yevpatoria
- Founded: 1969
- Town status: 1977

Government
  - Town Head: Oleh Paraskiv

Area
  - Total: 7.25 km^{2} (2.80 sq mi)
- Elevation: 4 m (13 ft)

Population (2014)
  - Total: 4,209 ▲
  - Density: 581/km^{2} (1,500/sq mi)
- Time zone: UTC+4 (MSK)
- Postal code: 97492
- Area code: +380 6569
- Website: http://rada.gov.ua/

Myrnyi (Ukrainian: Мирний; Russian: Мирный, romanized: Mirnyi; Crimean Tatar: Mirnıy) is an urban-type settlement in the Yevpatoria municipality of the Autonomous Republic of Crimea, a territory recognized by a majority of countries as part of Ukraine and incorporated by Russia as the Republic of Crimea. The town's population was 4,052 as of the 2001 Ukrainian Census. Population: 4,209 (2014 Census).

The settlement was founded in 1969. It received the status of an urban-type settlement in 1977.
