= List of ship losses during the Russo-Ukrainian war =

This is a list of vessels damaged, sunk, or captured during the Russo-Ukrainian War, including the 2014 annexation of Crimea, the 2018 Kerch Strait incident, and the 2022 Russian invasion of Ukraine.

== List of ships ==
=== 2014 annexation of Crimea ===
==== Russian Navy ====
- Ochakov — The Kara-class cruiser was scuttled in Donuzlav Bay, Crimea, Ukraine, on 6 March 2014. The scuttling was part of the Russian annexation of Crimea and was intended to block ships of the Ukrainian Navy. Ochakov was raised and scrapped at Inkerman in 2015.
- VM-416 — The Yelva-class diving support vessel was scuttled next to Ochakov on 7 March.

==== Ukrainian Navy ====
- At least 100 Ukrainian Navy vessels were captured by Russian forces during the capture of Southern Naval Base, Sevastopol Bay, and Striletska Bay; 35 of the ships were returned by the end of June 2014. According to one estimate, 75% of the Ukrainian naval fleet was captured in 2014.
- Ukrainian corvette Lutsk was captured on 20 March 2014 by the Russian Black Sea Fleet.
- Ukrainian landing ship Konstantin Olshansky was captured on 24 March 2014 by Russians during the capture of Southern Naval Base.

==== Ukrainian Sea Guard ====
- Numerous Ukrainian Sea Guard vessels were captured by Russian forces during the capture of Southern Naval Base, Sevastopol Bay, and Striletska Bay.

==== Civilian vessels ====
- Numerous civilian vessels owned by the Ukrainian state were expropriated by Russia during the annexation of Crimea.

=== 2014–2015 War in Donbas ===
==== Ukrainian Sea Guard ====
- BG-119 KaMO-527 — The Zhuk 1400M-class gunboat was destroyed by Donetsk People's Republic (DPR) forces near Mariupol on 31 August 2014.
- Kalkan-class patrol cutter — The boat was damaged by DPR forces near Mariupol on 31 August 2014.
- BG-22 — On 7 June 2015, the UMS-1000-class patrol cutter exploded and then sank in Mariupol while leaving its anchorage. On 26 May 2017, the boat was put back into service after being raised and repaired.

=== 2018 Kerch Strait incident ===
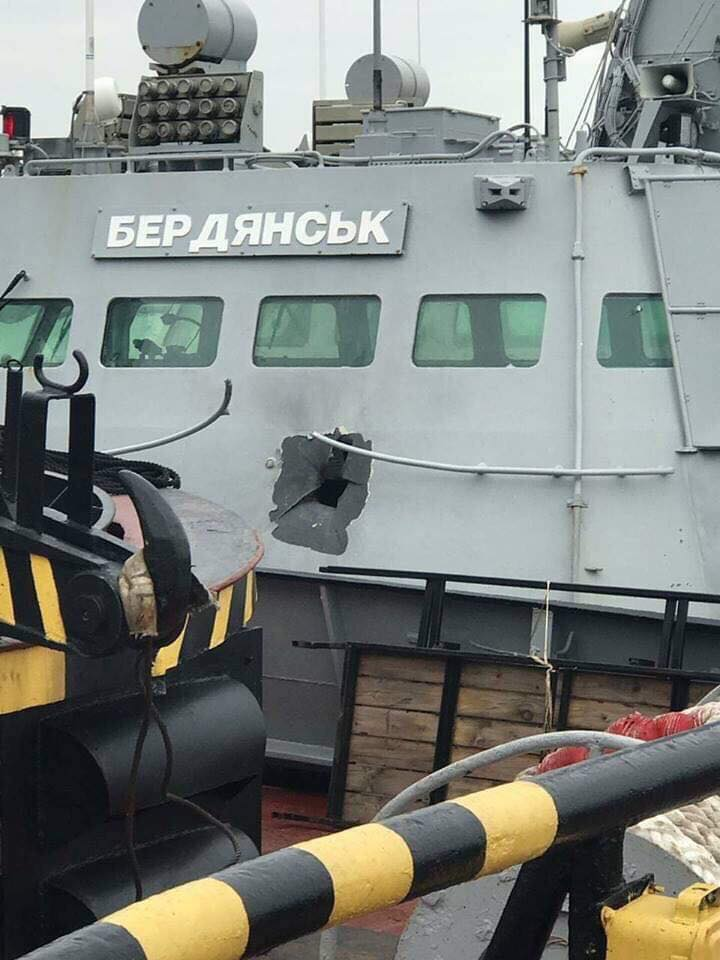
Berdiansk, after its capture by Russian forces, with a hole in the pilothouse

==== Russian Navy ====
- Izumrud — The patrol boat was damaged during the Kerch Strait incident of 25 November 2018 after colliding with the Russian tug Don.
- One unidentified Russian vessel was damaged the same day while ramming the Ukrainian tugboat Yany Kapu.

==== Ukrainian Navy ====
- P175 Berdiansk and P176 Nikopol — The two Gyurza-M-class artillery boats were damaged and captured by Russian ships on 25 November 2018. The ships were returned to Ukraine on 18 November 2019.
- A947 Yany Kapu — The Prometey-class tugboat was damaged and captured by Russia on 25 November 2018. It was returned to Ukraine on 18 November 2019.

=== Russian invasion of Ukraine (2022–present) ===
==== Russian Navy ====
- Five Raptor-class patrol boats — On 22 March 2022, a video appeared of a Raptor-class patrol boat being hit and damaged by an anti-tank guided missile. According to Russian sources, it had to be towed away afterwards. In May 2022, Ukrainian forces using Bayraktar TB2 drones attacked four Raptor-class boats (in addition to one BK-16 high-speed boat, mentioned below) near Snake Island. On 2 May 2022, two Raptor-class patrol boats were sunk by a Ukrainian Bayraktar TB2 off Snake Island in the Black Sea. The extent of the damage was not initially known, but it emerged that three boats were destroyed, while one of the Raptor boats withstood the damage and was filmed in Sevastopol, where it had been taken for repairs.
- Saratov — On 24 March 2022, a Russian Navy Alligator-class landing ship that was docked in Berdiansk, Ukraine, caught fire. The Ukrainian military claimed that they had hit it, that it was destroyed and that it was the Orsk. Later, the General Staff of the Ukrainian Armed Forces claimed that Saratov had been destroyed. Two other Russian ships, the Tsezar Kunikov, and the Novocherkassk, that were docked nearby sailed away, with fire and smoke billowing out of one. On 2 July 2022, Russian official said the Saratov had been scuttled in March by its own crew in order "to prevent detonation of the on-board munitions by the fire that had started" due to a Tochka-U ballistic missile that had hit the port. The Saratov was subsequently salvaged and was to be towed to Kerch, Crimea.
- Moskva — On 13 April 2022, two Ukrainian officials said that the Slava-class cruiser had been hit by Ukrainian Neptune anti-ship missiles and was on fire in heavy seas. The Russian Ministry of Defense said the ship was seriously damaged after a fire caused a munitions explosion. The next day, Russian officials said that the ship had sunk while being towed to port.
- BK-16 high-speed assault boat — In the first week of May 2022, a video appeared of a Ukrainian Bayraktar TB2 drone hitting and sinking a high-speed assault boat near Snake Island. The wreck was later recovered.
- Serna-class landing craft — On 7 May 2022, a video appeared of a Ukrainian Bayraktar TB2 drone hitting and sinking a landing craft on Snake Island.
- D-106 Ondatra-class landing craft - reportedly sunk after striking mine, mid-2022
- Veliky Ustyug — On 17 June 2022, a photo emerged of the ship being towed on the Volga River in a damaged state. The Buyan-M-class corvette had participated in the 2022 Russian invasion of Ukraine.
- Vasily Bekh — On 17 June 2022, Ukraine claimed to have sunk the rescue tug (Russian: Спасатель, "Spasatel") Vasily Bekh with two Harpoon missiles, causing it to sink shortly thereafter. On 21 June, British military intelligence confirmed the attack, stating that the vessel sunk was almost certainly Vasily Bekh.
- Natya-class minesweeper Ivan Golubets — On 29 October 2022, Ukrainian forces used an Unmanned Aerial and Submarine Vehicle to strike Russian forces in Sevastopol, Crimea. According to Russia, Ukrainian UAVs slightly damaged the Natya-class minesweeper;
- Natya-class minesweeper Kovrovets reportedly destroyed in Ukrainian attack in May 2024.
- On 29 October 2022, Admiral Makarov suffered damage during an attack on Sevastopol by several air and sea drones, with at least one sea drone striking the ship, reportedly disabling its radar. Naval News subsequently reported that little damage had been inflicted on either of the two warships (Ivan Golubets, Admiral Makarov) that were hit by the sea drones. On 15 August 2023, Admiral Makarov returned to active duty.
- Yury Ivanov-class intelligence ship Ivan Khurs was possibly damaged by one of three Ukrainian sea drones on 24 May 2023. On 23 March 2024, a missile strike on the port of Sevastopol reportedly damaged the ship again; satellite imagery taken after the attack seemingly confirmed the damage.
- Olenegorsky Gornyak — On 4 August 2023, near the Port of Novorossiysk the Project 775 Ropucha-class landing ship was seriously damaged by a joint effort of the Security Service of Ukraine and the Ukrainian Navy, possibly using a sea drone, and towed to port by the Russian Navy. Following the attack, the Ukrainian Navy reported Russian ships leaving port and dispersing in the Black Sea.
- Rostov-on-Don and Minsk — On 13 September 2023, this submarine and landing ship, respectively, were attacked by Ukrainian Su-24 bombers armed with Storm Shadow missiles, visibly destroying the Minsk landing ship following a nighttime raid on Sevastopol. Rostov-on-Don, the Kilo-class submarine, was damaged beyond economic repair, according to a military analyst. However, the Russian government stated they would repair both ships and return them to full operational status.
- A Russian Project KS-701 Tunets-class patrol boat was sunk on 13 September 2023 in the Black Sea in a Ukrainian attack.
- Sergey Kotov – A project 22160 patrol ship was reported commissioned in May 2022 and was reported to be damaged by a Ukrainian naval drone attack on 14 September 2023. On 5 March 2024, the Sergey Kotov was again attacked by Ukrainian forces, this time using MAGURA V5 unmanned surface vehicles while the ship was off the coast of Crimea near the Kerch Strait. Ukrainian military spokesmen announced that the ship took damage to the stern and later sank.
- Askold (ru) — On 4 November 2023, Ukrainian forces struck Zalyv Shipbuilding yard in Russian-occupied Kerch, Crimea, with cruise missiles, damaging the relatively new Karakurt-class corvette Askold, which carried Kalibur cruise missiles. On 6 November 2023 President Zelenskyy stated that the ship was destroyed.
- Novocherkassk, a major Russian landing ship, was struck 26 December 2023 while docked in Feodosia, southern Crimea, by air-launched cruise missiles, according to Ukraine's Air Force. The strike was reportedly confirmed by Russian authorities and by Russian media. Ukraine said that it was destroyed and unlikely to return to service. Video supplied by various sources, including Ukrainian authorities and Russian reports on Telegram, showed massive and multiple explosions and fires, with indications that munitions aboard the ship had been detonated by the attack (Ukraine said the ship had been used to launch cruise missiles against Ukrainian cities). Russian authorities conceded that one person had been killed, and other sources indicated more, though no official confirmation of the ship's loss was immediately made. Independent analysts said that the strike substantially impeded Russia's ability to further attack and invade Ukraine's Black Sea coast. Reported casualties of 74 crew killed and 27 wounded. Wreck apparently removed in late January/early February 2024. Novocherkassk was also damaged at Berdiansk on 24 March 2022.
- Ivanovets — On 1 February 2024, Ukraine released video claiming to show the sinking of the Tarantul-class corvette R-334 Ivanovets in Donuzlav, a bay located in the western part of Crimea, using MAGURA V5 USVs.
- Tsezar Kunikov — On 14 February 2024, Ukraine released a video showing the sinking of the Project 775 (Ropucha-I-class) large landing ship Tsezar Kunikov off the coast of Crimea by Ukrainian MAGURA V5 sea drones. Tsezar Kunikov had been previously damaged in a Ukrainian attack on 24 March 2022 at Berdiansk port, Ukraine. The sinking of the ship has been confirmed by Russian sources.
- Mangust-class patrol boat — On 6 May 2024, Ukraine used MAGURA V5 sea drones to attack a Russian patrol boat in Crimea. Footage was released appearing to show the drone detonating next to a small boat appearing to resemble a Mangust-class vessel.
- Saturn – On 6 June 2024, Ukrainian naval drones sank the Russian tugboat Saturn.
- Admiral Essen – On 6 April 2026, the Russian frigate was attacked by Ukrainian drones as it was docked in the Port of Novorossiysk on the eastern end of the Black Sea. Fires on the ship lasted over 18 hours, and after-action battle damage assessments indicated significant internal damage as well as critical damage in its ability to use its Kalibr cruise missiles, leaving it unable to strike Ukrainian territory.
- Merkury – on 22 November 2026, the Russian corvette was struck by a Ukrainian naval drone while docked at the port of Benghazi, Libya. The Merkury capsized and was left most submerged.

==== Ukrainian Navy ====
- A206 Vinnytsia – In June 2022, footage emerged showing the Grisha II-class ship sunk at moorings, after a Russian attack on 24 February 2022. The ship had previously been converted to an auxiliary ship in 2018 and decommissioned in 2021.
- Eight unidentified vessels were claimed, on 26 February 2022, as destroyed by Russian forces.
- F130 Hetman Sahaidachny — On 3 March 2022, it was reported by Ukrainian forces that the Krivak-III class frigate, the flagship of Ukraine, was scuttled in Mykolaiv to prevent its capture by the Russian Navy.
- P190 Sloviansk — On 3 March 2022, the patrol boat was sunk by a Russian aircraft using an X-31 air-to-surface missile.
- Henichesk (M360) – In August 2022, Ukrainian officials reported the loss of the Yevgenya-class minesweeper during the opening phases of the Russian invasion, alongside P190 Sloviansk.
- On 14 March 2022, the Russian source RT reported that the Russian Armed Forces had captured about a dozen Ukrainian ships in Berdiansk. The vessels reported as captured included two Gyurza-M-class artillery boats (including Akkerman), the Matka-class missile boat Pryluky, a Project 1124P (Grisha II)-class corvette (likely an already decommissioned vessel given the absence of active ships of this class in the Ukrainian Navy), a Zhuk-class patrol boat, a Yevgenya-class minesweeper, the Polnocny-class landing ship Yuri Olefirenko, and an Ondatra-class landing craft.
- P186 Korets — A Sorum-class sea-going tug converted to a patrol vessel was captured by Russian forces during the fall of Berdiansk.
- Five Gyurza-M-class gunboats — P174 Akkerman and P179 Vyshhorod were captured by Russian forces during the fall of Berdiansk. P177 Kremenchuk was captured by Russian forces during the Siege of Mariupol. P178 Lubny was declared missing by Ukraine; the ship was sunk and then raised by Russia during the Siege of Mariupol. On 4 November 2022, one Gyurza-M class boat from the Ukrainian Navy was damaged by a Russian ZALA Lancet loitering munition near Ochakiv.
- A500 Donbas — On 6 April 2022, satellite images showed the command ship being engulfed in heavy smoke in the port of Mariupol; the Ukrainian Defence Ministry confirmed that the ship was destroyed during the Siege of Mariupol.
- Dmitry Chubar — The Rubin-class hydrographic boat was most likely captured or destroyed between the beginning of the invasion on 24 February 2022 and 20 May 2022; in 2021, it had been reported as deployed in Berdyansk. In May 2022, satellite imagery of a Rubin-class boat captured by Russia in Mariupol emerged. Later in 2022, its capture was confirmed due to a change in the ship's registration. As of 2023, it is operated by the Russian port authorities in occupied Mariupol.
- L450 Stanislav — On 29 November 2022, Ukrainian media reported the loss of the Centaur-LK-class fast assault craft Stanislav during the 7 May Ukrainian counterattacks on Snake Island.
- 16 to 24 attack/reconnaissance USVs — Head no. 45V2NS1 was captured and subsequently destroyed by Russia in September 2022. In an attack on 29 October 2022, Russia claimed that Ukraine used seven USVs; independent analysis indicated the use of six to eight vessels, among which at least two were destroyed by Russia and at least three detonated when they hit Russian vessels. One USV was reported to have detonated in an attack on the Sheskharis oil terminal in Novorossiysk on 17 November 2022. Three USVs were reported to have been destroyed by Russia in an attack on the Sevastopol naval base on 22 March 2023. Two USVs were reported to have been destroyed in an attack on the Sevastopol naval base on 24 April 2023. In an attack on the Russian Navy intelligence ship Ivan Khurs, of which footage was first released on 24 May 2023, Russia claimed that three USVs were destroyed. Footage indicated that one was destroyed by Ivan Khurs, and one detonated upon colliding with the ship. In an attack on the Russian Navy intelligence ship Priazovye, of which footage was released on 11 June 2023, Russia claimed six were destroyed and showed evidence of the destruction of Kit ta Yenot.
- PO-2-class small patrol gunboat — On 17 April 2023, footage released by Russia showed the destruction of a PO-2-class gunboat by a Russian ZALA Lancet strike.
- Centaur LK — On 26 June 2023, a Centaur LK fast assault craft was damaged at port by a Russian attack.
- Simferopol – On 28 August 2025, the ship was sunk after a Russian naval drone strike in the delta of the Danube River, killing two sailors and leaving seven other wounded or missing.

==== Ukrainian Sea Guard ====
- Four Zhuk-class patrol boats – BG-118 Arabat and one unidentified boat were captured at Berdyansk. BG-108 KaMO-517 and one unidentified boat were destroyed, and their wrecks subsequently captured, during the Siege of Mariupol.
- Six Kalkan-class patrol cutters – BG-308, BG-310, and BG-311 were captured at Berdyansk. BG-304, which was awaiting repair prior to capture, BG-309, and one unidentified boat were captured during the Siege of Mariupol.
- Four UMS-1000-class patrol cutters – BG-14 and BG-24 were captured at Berdyansk. BG-22 and BG-23 were both damaged and captured by Russia during the Siege of Mariupol.
- BG-732 – The Adamant 315-class motor yacht was captured at Berdyansk.
- BG-32 Donbas – The Stenka-class patrol boat was sunk during the Siege of Mariupol. In June 2022, it was reported that Russian forces raised the ship and sent it to Novosibirsk for repairs.
- One BRIG Navigator N730M – This RIB was most likely destroyed in the Siege of Mariupol.

===== Unaccounted for east of the Kerch Strait =====
- BG-59 Onyx – This border support ship converted from a fishing vessel in 2000 was most likely captured or destroyed between the beginning of the invasion and 20 May 2022; as of 2020, it had been reported as deployed in Mariupol.

==== Russian ships claimed to have been lost or damaged – later rebutted ====
- Vasily Bykov - On 7 March 2022, it was reported that the Russian patrol ship Vasily Bykov may have been damaged by Ukrainian shore-based multiple-launch rocket fire. However, the ship was subsequently reported as having entered Sevastopol on 16 March 2022 with no obvious damage. On 14 September 2023, Ukrainian forces claimed that they had damaged Vasily Bykov.
- Admiral Essen - According to an advisor to the Ukrainian President's Office, Oleksiy Arestovich, on 3 April 2022, the ship was allegedly seriously damaged by Ukrainian Armed Forces as a result of an attack using an initially unspecified weapon system, later reported as being an R-360 Neptune anti-ship cruise missile. On 12 April 2022, the Russian Defence Ministry released a video showing Admiral Essen allegedly destroying a Ukrainian Bayraktar TB2 unmanned aerial vehicle (UAV) off the coast of Crimea, using two missiles of the Shtil-1 surface-to-air missile system.
- Admiral Makarov – On 6 May 2022, Ukrainian MP Oleksiy Honcharenko claimed that Admiral Makarov had been struck and badly damaged by a Ukrainian missile. On 7 May 2022, an adviser to the Office of the President of Ukraine, Oleksiy Arestovych, said that the report was a "misunderstanding", and that the vessel attacked was actually a Serna-class landing craft. On 9 May, Admiral Makarov was spotted sailing intact near Sevastopol.
- Vsevolod Bobrov, a project 23120 logistics support vessel, was claimed to have suffered major fire damage during the night of 11–12 May 2022 after an alleged Ukrainian attack. The ship returned unharmed to Sevastopol on 15 May 2022. It had arrived in the Black Sea in January 2022.
- Azov and Yamal – On 24 March 2024, the Ukrainian general staff claimed that the Russian landing ship Azov and its sister ship Yamal were hit by cruise missiles and seriously damaged. Satellite images did not reveal any damage, showing that the missile had hit the pier next to the ships, presumably diverted by the electronic warfare systems of the ships. Ukrainian sources claimed that Yamal had been critically damaged in the attack despite satellite images not showing any damage.
- Kommuna – On 21 April 2024, Ukrainian sources claimed that the Ukrainian Navy had struck Kommuna with an R-360 Neptune missile while it was docked at the Port of Sevastopol. The governor of Sevastopol reported that an anti-ship missile had been repelled in Sevastopol and that "fragments caused a small fire, which was quickly extinguished". Subsequent satellite images did not reveal any damage.

==== Ships sunk in practice ====
- Ukrainian corvette Ternopil – On 20 July 2023, the captured – originally Ukrainian and after capture Russian – Grisha-class anti-submarine corvette was sunk as a target during live fire exercises by the Black Sea Fleet. It was reportedly struck by an SS-N-22 missile fired by the Tarantul III missile boat Ivanovets in the northwestern part of the Black Sea.

==== Summary ====
Number of vessels listed above as destroyed, sunk, scuttled, or captured excluding claims by the opposing side
Ship type	Russian Navy	Ukrainian Navy
Surface vessels
Cruisers	1 (9,380 t)	
Frigate		1 (3,150 t)
Corvette		2 (1,706 t)
Patrol Boats	3 (69 t)	6 (1,947 t)
Gunboat		6 (180 t)
Assault boats/craft	1	1 (94 t)
Surface vessels subtotal	5 (>9,449 t)	16 (>7,907 t)
Auxiliary vessels
Command ships		1 (5,520 t)
Landing ships (>50m length)	1 (3,400 t)	1 (1,192 t) (Note: Includes the Yuri Olefirenko.)
Landing craft (<50m)	1 (61 t)	
Minesweeper		1 (88.5 t)
Tug	2 (1,457 t)	
Hydrographic vessels		1 (? t)
Auxiliary vessels subtotal	4 (7,473 t)	3 (>5,608.5 t)
Total vessels	9	15
Total tonnage	>12,391 t	>12,845.5 t

==== Other naval vessels ====
On 9 September 2022, the engine of the Romanian Navy minesweeper Locotenent Dimitrie Nicolescu was damaged by the explosion at the waterline of a floating sea mine, 40 km off Constanța. There were no casualties.

== Civilian vessels ==
=== 2022 ===
- SGV-Flot — The ore-bulk-oil carrier, owned by the Samarashipping and heading from Batumi to Yeysk, was struck by a missile fired by Ukrainian forces in the Sea of Azov off Dolzhanskaya, Russia, at around 11:00 a.m. on 24 February 2022 and was moderately damaged, according to the Russian border guard service at Krasnodar. They claimed that two crew were injured, one of them seriously.
- (Russia) Seraphim Sarovskiy — The general cargo ship, owned by Rechmortrans and following a route from Turkey to Azov, was struck by a missile fired by Ukrainian forces in the Sea of Azov off Dolzhanskaya at around 11:00 a.m. on 24 February 2022 and was moderately damaged, according to the Russian border guard service at Krasnodar.
- (Marshall Islands) Yasa Jupiter — The bulk carrier, owned by Ya-Sa Holding of Turkey, was struck by a missile fired by Russian forces in the Black Sea off Odesa, Ukraine, on 24 February 2022 and was damaged. It was on a voyage from the Dniepr to Constanța, Romania.
- (Moldova) Millennial Spirit — The chemical tanker was shelled in the Black Sea off the coast of Ukraine on 25 February 2022. Its crew of ten were rescued, and the ship caught fire and was sunk.
- (Panama) Namura Queen — The cargo ship was struck in the Black Sea off the coast of Ukraine by a missile fired by Russian forces on 25 February 2022. There were no casualties reported and ship remained afloat.
- (Ukraine) Sapphire – On 26 February 2022, the civilian rescue ship was captured by Russian forces after trying to rescue Ukrainian sailors at Snake Island. On 25 March, the crew was returned as part of a prisoner exchange. On 8 April, Russia returned the ship to Ukrainian authorities.
- (Ukraine) Afina – On 26 February 2022, the bulk carrier was captured by Russian forces near Snake Island en route to Constanța, Romania. It was later released.
- (Ukraine) Princess Nikol – On 26 February 2022, the bulk carrier was captured by Russian forces near Snake Island en route to Constanța.
- (Saint Vincent and the Grenadines) Lady Anastasia — The motor yacht, owned by Russian oligarch and Rosoboronexport head Aleksandr Mikheyev, experienced an attempted scuttling by one of its crew, a Ukrainian mechanic, at Palma de Mallorca, Spain, on 27 February 2022.
- Banglar Samriddhi — The bulk carrier belonging to the Bangladesh Shipping Corporation was struck by a Russian missile at Mykolaiv and was set afire on 2 March 2022. One crew member, third engineer Hadisur Rahman, was killed.
- Helt — The cargo ship, owned by the Tallinn-based Vista Shipping Agency, sank off the coast of Ukraine on 2 March 2022, likely after striking a mine. The Panama Maritime Authority later reported that the ship had been sunk by a Russian missile. Four crew members were initially reported as missing and were later found. The ship was also reported to have been captured by the Russian Navy and used as a shield against Ukrainian shelling.
- Lord Nelson — The Panama Maritime Authority reported that Russian missiles had damaged the Panamanian-flagged ship, which remained afloat with no casualties reported.
- (Russia) Omskiy-205 – On 27 March 2022, the cargo ship became flooded in its engine room in the Kerch Strait. The vessel was on a voyage from Istanbul, Turkey, to Rostov-on-Don. It is unclear if the ship was hit by a rogue wave, or was a casualty of the 2022 Russian invasion of Ukraine.
- (Dominica) Azburg — The cargo ship was shelled and sunk on 4 April 2022 during the Battle of Mariupol, after being damaged the day before by two Russian missiles. One crew member was injured.
- (Ukraine) Kapitan Belousov — According to the Ukrainian military, the Mariupol Port Authority–owned icebreaker was shelled during the Siege of Mariupol, overnight between 7 and 8 April 2022. One crew member was killed and several injured.
- (Malta) Apache — According to Russian Ministry of Defence spokesman Igor Konashenkov, the bulk carrier, belonging to Turkey-based Misha Shipping, was fired upon by a patrol vessel of the Black Sea Fleet while in the Sea of Azov on 8 April. The bombardment started a fire in the stern, which was extinguished by its crew. Konashenkov called the vessel a "Ukrainian cargo ship" and claimed that it had diverted from a convoy in an attempt to evacuate leaders of the Azov Battalion and mercenaries from Mariupol. Konashenkov reported no injuries, and that the vessel along with its crew were being escorted to Yeysk.
- (Liberia) Smarta — Ukrainian reports claimed that the bulk carrier, docked at Mariupol, was shelled on 11 April 2022 and boarded by Russian forces. Verkhovna Rada Human Rights Ombudsman Lyudmyla Denisova claimed that the crew member was taken "in an unknown direction".
- (Russia) Ten unidentified vessels — The State Border Guard Service of Ukraine stated on 13 April 2022 that eight Russian cargo ships and two tankers, originally docked in Odesa for maintenance, were seized to "serve in the interests of Ukraine to restore its economy".
- Petr Godovanets or Ukraine – On 20 June 2022 one or the other of the Russian oil field jackup rigs was destroyed by a Ukrainian missile in the Black Sea. The other, plus Tavrida (Russia), was damaged.

=== 2023 ===
- (Russia) Sig – The chemical tanker was damaged near Kerch Strait on 5 August 2023.
- (Turkey) Tuzla – On 24 January 2023, the cargo ship was severely damaged by Russian shelling while in port at Kherson.
- (Liberia) Ali Najafov – The oil tanker was damaged by a sea mine near the coast of Romania on 16 October 2023. Minor damage and no injuries were reported.
- (Liberia) Kmax Ruler – On 8 November 2023, an empty bulk carrier was damaged when hit by an airborne-launched Russian anti-radar missile Kh-31P, killing the port pilot and injuring crew members, whilst the ship was entering the Port of Pivdennyi near Odesa.
- (Panama) Vyssos – On 27 December 2023, the freighter struck a naval mine off Bystre at the entrance to the Danube Delta. The ship was grounded to prevent sinking. One crewman was injured.

=== 2024 ===
- On 12 September 2024, an unidentified cargo vessel was damaged in a Russian missile attack while sailing inside Romania's exclusive economic zone.
- (Saint Kitts and Nevis) Paresa — On 6 October 2024, the freighter was damaged in a Russian air attack on Pivdennyi Port.

=== 2025 ===
- (Panama) MSC Levante F – On 1 March 2025, the freighter was damaged in a Russian ballistic missile attack on the Port of Odesa.
- (Barbados) MJ Pinar – On 12 March 2025, the bulk carrier was damaged in a Russian ballistic missile attack on the Port of Odesa, killing four Syrian nationals.
- (Turkey) On 12 December 2025, three Turkish-owned ships, including the Cenk T, struck by Iranian-designed Russian-operated Geran-2 loitering munitions, were damaged at the Ukrainian Chornomorsk and Odesa ports.

=== 2026 ===
- (Russia) Volgo-Balt 138 - on 3 April 2026 the sea-river vessel was struck by Ukrainian drones in the Sea of Azov and either sank on 3 April, or was towed to shore on 5 April to Kuchugury, where it probably sank. Three crew members died.
- (Guinea-Bissau) MV Golden Leo, 26 July 2026 - The ship was scuttled, or capsized and sank, after being hit at starboard side by three Russian Kh-59/Kh-69 cruise missiles on 20 July off the coast of Odesa, Ukraine. The attack killed nine crew and a harbor pilot after the grain-laden vessel had just departed the port, while eight crew members were rescued. Her cargo was removed by lightering.
- (Russia) Yanina, 1 August 2026 - The cargo ship was sunk by two Ukrainian drones in the Black Sea 130 nautical miles (240 km) from Novorossiysk. Sixteen of her seventeen crew were rescued by Delphius (Antigua and Barbuda) and one by a Russian helicopter.
- (Guinea-Bissau) Mera Queen, 5 August 2026 - The cargo ship was sunk by a Russian air attack by three missiles and several drones at Odesa.
- (Dominican Republic) MV Progress IV, 27 August 2026 - The cargo ship caught fire and subsequently sank in Romania's exclusive economic zone approximately 15 nautical miles (28 km) from Sfântu Gheorghe in the Black Sea after a probable Russian drone attack. All 12 crew members were recovered alive, ten of them by the Romanian Border Police, and two by Mohamad B (Comoros).
- (Saint Kitts and Nevis) Royad Mammadov, 5 October 2026 - The cargo ship was sunk by Russian drones some 20 miles (32 km) off Romania in the Black Sea. 11 crew members were rescued by Romanian vessels and helicopters, 2 others were killed.
- (Togo) Alfa Wattan, 6 October 2026 - The cargo ship was sunk by Russian drones 70 nautical miles (130 km) off Bulgaria in the Black Sea. Its crew was unaccounted for.
- (Guinea-Bissau) HS Dignity, 12 October 2026 - The cargo ship was sunk by drones in the Black Sea, about 17 nautical miles (31 km) off Krapets, Dobrich Province, Bulgaria (43°32′N 28°59′E) east of Cape Shabla. Five crew were rescued and 11 crew were unaccounted for.
- (Palau) Able, 19 October 2026 - The cargo ship sank in the Black Sea off Turkey after being damaged by Russian drones on 6 October in Bulgaria's exclusive economic zone about 70 nautical miles (130 km) from Byala, Varna Province.
- (Liberia) Contship Jet, 28 October 2026 - The cargo ship was hit by three sea drones approximately 21 nautical miles (39 km) off Shabla, 16 kilometres (9.9 mi) off Cape Kaliakra around Noon. She sank after drifting south before midnight. Her 18 crew were safe.
- (Comoros) Khoryv, 29 October 2026 - The cargo ship was attacked by Russian drones and set on fire about 13 nautical miles (24 km) from Constanța, outside Romania's territorial waters, but close to their boundary, in the Black Sea on 23 October. She capsized and started sinking, bottom up adrift. Nine crew were rescued by the offshore supply ship Sartor.
- (Somalia) Betul 8, 16 November 2026 - The cargo ship capsized and sank after being struck by two Russian drones in the Black Sea about 40 nautical miles (74 km) southeast of Cape Kaliakra. The crew was rescued.
- (Liberia) Gas Husky, 17 November 2026 - The propane tanker was sunk after being struck by four Russian drones in the Black Sea approximately 50 nautical miles (93 km) off Byala, 55 nautical miles (102 km) southeast of Varna, Bulgaria. The crew was rescued by a Cougar helicopter.

== See also ==
- List of aviation shootdowns and accidents during the Russo-Ukrainian war
- List of Black Sea incidents involving Russia and Ukraine
- Black Sea Fleet
