= Askold (disambiguation) =

Askold, as part of Askold and Dir, was one of the earliest rulers of Kiev.

The term may also refer to the following:

- Askold's Grave, a park in Kyiv
  - Askold Grave Church, rotunda
- Askold's Grave (opera)
- Russian ship Askold, a series of ships that used the name
  - Russian frigate Askold, frigate stricken in 1861
  - Russian corvette Askold, corvette stricken in 1893
  - Russian cruiser Askold, cruiser scrapped in 1922
  - Russian missile corvette Askold, Karakurt-class corvette of the Russian Navy launched in 2021

== People ==
- Askold Ivantchik (born 1965), Russian historian
- Askold Khovanskii (born 1947), Russian mathematician
- Askold Krushelnycky, British journalist
- Askold Lozynskyj (born 1952), American lawyer
- Askold Makarov (1925–2000), Russian ballet dancer
- Askold Melnyczuk (born 1954), American writer
- Askold Vinogradov (1929–2005), Russian mathematician

== See also ==
- Askolds Hermanovskis (1912–1967), Latvian skier
