= Russian ship Askold =

At least three ships of the Imperial Russian Navy, and one corvette of the modern Russian Navy, have been named Askold after the semi-legendary rulers of Kiev, Askold and Dir.

- Russian frigate Askold – a 46-gun frigate stricken in 1861 and subsequently broken up.
- Russian corvette Askold – a 17-gun corvette stricken in 1893 and sold for scrap in 1901.
- Russian cruiser Askold – a protected cruiser that participated in the Battle of the Yellow Sea during the Russo-Japanese War. Scrapped in 1922.
- Russian corvette Askold (2021) – a Karakurt-class corvette of the Russian Navy launched in 2021. In 2023 reportedly struck by Ukrainian missiles and significantly damaged.

== Civilian ships ==
- Russian steamboat Askold – a freight steamboat of Russian Steam Navigation and Trading Company, etc. (1879–1928, till 1886 freight steamboat named Astrakhan)
