= Sig (tanker) =

Tanker built in 2014

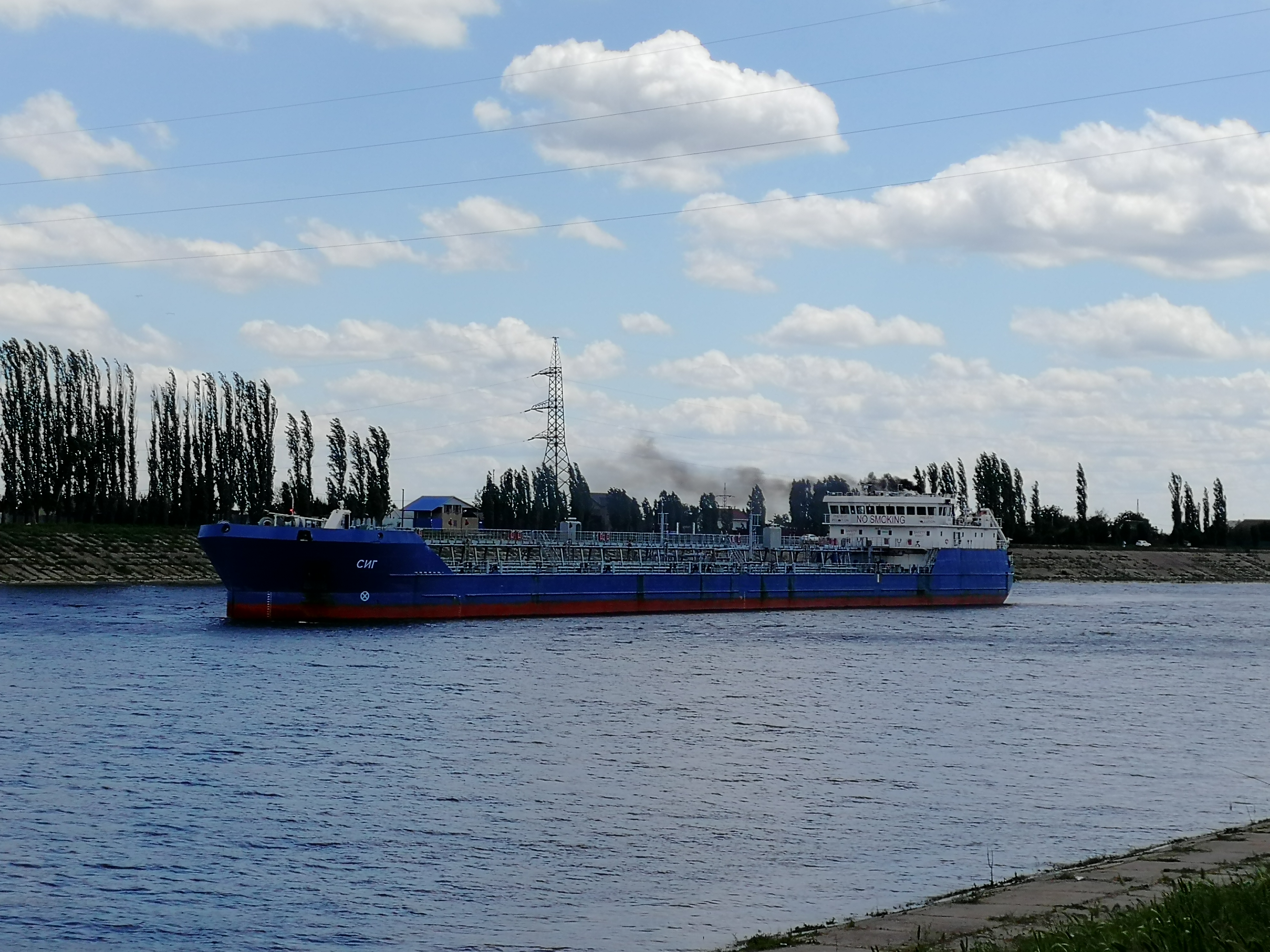
- The oil tanker Sig in 2020

History
- Name: Sig
- Owner: Transpetrochart
- Operator: Transpetrochart
- Port of registry: St. Petersburg
- Builder: Kostromskoy Shipbuilding Shiprepairing Plant
- Completed: 2014
- Identification: IMO number: 9735335; MMSI number: 273340190; Callsign: UDKP

General characteristics
- Type: Product tanker
- Tonnage: 4,754 GT; 6,619 DWT
- Length: 141 m (462 ft 7 in)
- Beam: 16 m (52 ft 6 in)
- Draft: 4.08 m (13 ft 5 in)
- Crew: 11

Sig (Russian: Сиг) is a Russian product tanker, designed to transport refined oil products, it is 141 m (462 ft 7 in) long, measured at 4,754 gross tonnage (GT). The vessel is registered in St. Petersburg, Russia.

== History ==
The Sig, and its owner, Transpetrochart, were placed under the United States Office of Foreign Assets Control sanctions in 2019 for supplying jet fuel to Russian forces in Syria and is sanctioned by the US Department of Treasury under Ukraine/Russia-Related Sanctions Regulations UKRAINE-EO13685 which relates to blocking property of certain persons and prohibiting certain transactions with respect to the Crimea Region of Ukraine.

On 5 August 2023 the tanker was reported to have been the target of a naval drone attack by Ukrainian forces in the Black Sea 17 kilometres (11 mi) south of the Crimean Bridge which damaged the engine room on the starboard side. The drone carried 450 kilograms (990 lb) of TNT and left a 1 by 2 m (3 ft 3 in by 6 ft 7 in) hole in the side of the ship, partly below the waterline. The Russian media company TASS reported that the vessel was afloat and was being assisted by two tugboats. The tanker was not carrying any cargo at the time of the attack.

A video of the ship in dry dock shows the hole below the waterline to be much larger than the initial assessment.

== See also ==
- List of ship losses during the Russo-Ukrainian War
