= List of Black Sea incidents involving Russia and Ukraine =

The following is a list of Black Sea incidents involving Russia and Ukraine since 1994 with the Odessa incident until the full-scale Russo-Ukrainian War in 2022.

== 1994 ==
On 8 April 1994, during the Black Sea Fleet dispute, the Ukrainian marines attempted to block a Russian research vessel from leaving the Ukrainian port of Odessa with 10 million dollars' worth of radio-navigational equipment, with Ukraine claiming piracy. However, Russian official claimed that the move was justified by Ukraine's failure to provide its share of funds for navigation services of the Black Sea Fleet, which was at that time under a joint Russo-Ukrainian command pending a division between Russia and Ukraine. Russian sailors arrested one Ukrainian Navy border guard for attempting to inspect the ship, while Ukraine sent six ships and four Su-15 fighters to intercept it, although they retreated after an attack group was sent by the Black Sea Fleet. Some have reported that the tracer bullets and water cannons were used to drive off a Ukrainian coastguard vessel. The next day, Ukraine responded to the incident by sending commandos to seize the maintenance base of the fleet's 318th division at Odessa and arrested Russian officers, with Russia claiming that the Russian officers and civilians had been beaten and evicted by Ukrainians. Claiming that the Ukrainian authorities were forcing 18 naval families in Odessa out, Russia sent a big troopship, a cruiser and an anti-submarine vessel to Odessa from Sevastopol to pick up families, although the further tensions were averted after the ships turned back following the statements of Ukrainian Defence Minister Vitaliy Radetsky that he "would bar them from entering Odessa". Russian units of Black Sea Fleet went on combat alert. Ukrainian navy put Odessa base and Black Sea Fleet river patrol unit under its own control.

== 2000 ==
- Russian shelling of civilian vessel Vereshchagino

== 2003 ==
In October, Russia started to build a dam from the Taman Peninsula towards Tuzla island in Ukraine (near Crimea) without any preliminary consultations with the Ukrainian government. After the construction of the 3.8 km long dam was stopped at the Russian-Ukrainian border. The construction of the dam caused the increased intensity of stream in the strait and deterioration of the Ukrainian Tuzla island. To save the island from deterioration, the Ukrainian authorities financed ground works to deepen the bed of the strait.

The aim for building a dam was to stop Russian ships from having to pay a toll to Ukraine while crossing the Strait of Kerch, which is considered as territorial waters of Ukraine.

In late 2003, Ukraine and Russia agreed that the strait of Kerch became shared internal waters of both countries. In 2014 after Russia annexed the Crimean peninsula, the strait was occupied by Russia.

== 2013 ==
- Incident with fishermen and Russian border guards in the Sea of Azov (2013)

== 2015 ==
On June 3, the Ukrainian frigate Hetman Sahaydachniy detected the Russian frigate Ladny, which was on a reconnaissance mission near the territorial waters of Ukraine. Moreover, the ship was on the way to interfere with shipping in the area. The Ukrainian Navy mobilized the cutter Pryluky and the harbor minesweeper Henichensk, an Mi-14 helicopter, and the cutter Mykolaiv of the Maritime Border Guard. Ladny was forced to cancel operations and sailed back.

== 2017 ==
On January 27, the Ukrainian diving support vessel Pochaiv was hit by sniper fire from the Tavrida drilling platform, originally operated by Chernomorneftegaz, being seized by Russian forces in 2014.

On February 1, a Ukrainian Navy An-26 transport aircraft came under small arms fire from Russian military personnel stationed on a drill rig, while flying over the Odesa gas field in the Black Sea. This gas field is located within Ukraine's exclusive economic zone. While the rig in question has not been named, it was among those stolen by Russian forces in the aftermath of the annexation of Crimea. According to the Ukrainian military, the aircraft was on a training flight and was hit by small caliber shells.

== 2018 ==
On 21 September, a Russian Su-27 fighter from Russian-occupied Crimea, approached dangerously at a close distance an An-26 military transport aircraft of the Ukrainian Naval Forces, which was executing a scheduled task above the Black Sea. On 25 September, during the Volia-2018 Ukrainian strategic command and staff exercises, a Russian Su-27 fighter jet made a dangerous flyby over Ukrainian warships.

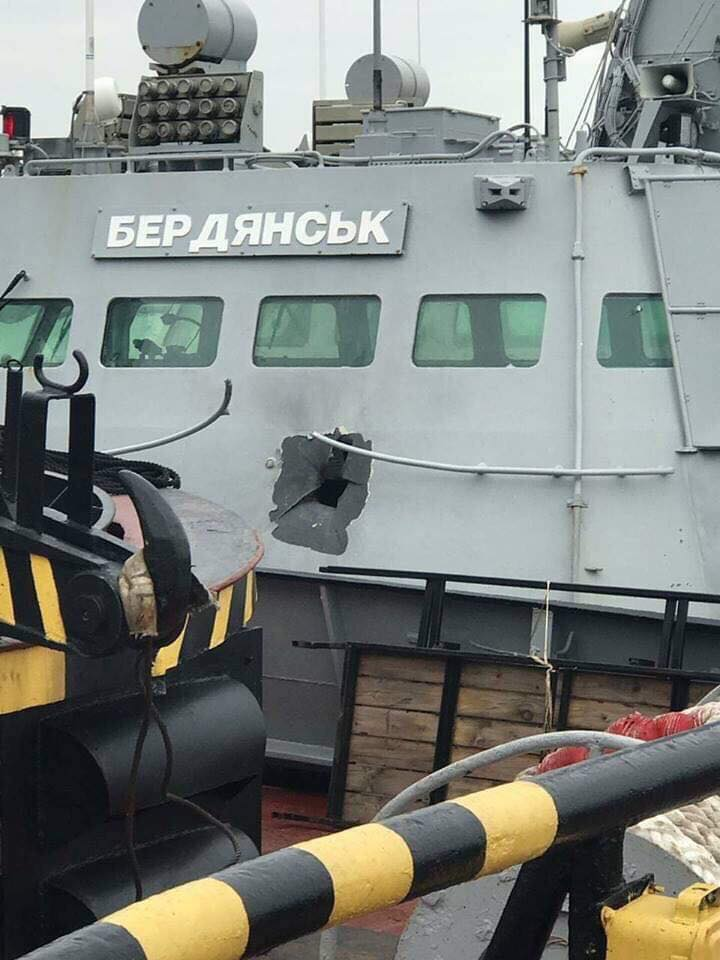
BK-02 Berdyansk after being captured, with a hole in the pilothouse

On 25 November three Ukrainian navy vessels which attempted to redeploy from Odesa on the Black Sea to the Sea of Azov port of Berdyansk were damaged and captured by the Russian FSB during the Kerch Strait incident.

== 2019 ==
In the summer, Russia blocked many areas without having first filed any such requests, thus interrupting navigation and nearly blocking international shipping to and from Georgia, Bulgaria, Romania and Ukraine. On July 24, Russia blocked off 120 thousand square kilometers—nearly 25 percent of the entire Black Sea surface.

On 10 July, despite a coastal notification for seafarers regarding the closure of the area for conducting the international Exercise Sea Breeze 2019, the destroyer Smetlivy, a ship of the Russian Black Sea Fleet, entered at about 08:00 on July 10, an area closed to navigation, where practical naval artillery shooting was conducted by a naval group of an international coalition, and provoked a dangerous situation.

In August, the Ukrainian Navy small reconnaissance ship Pereyaslav during their trip to Georgia to participate in exercise Agile Spirit 2019 and while in neutral waters, crew received a warning over the radio from a Russian navy ship. The Russians warned that the Ukrainians needed to turn away because the area was allegedly blocked. International coordinators did not confirm that fact, so the captain of the Pereyaslav decided to maintain the vessel along its original course. Soon thereafter, the Kasimov, a large Russian anti-submarine corvette, Project 1124M/Grisha V-class, was spotted near the Ukrainian ship. The Russian corvette's aggressive behavior only ceased when a Turkish reconnaissance plane arrived close to the Pereyaslav. This incident was filmed by a Ukrainian team of military journalists as part of the Ukrainian delegation participating in the exercise.

On 14 November, during the Third International Conference for Maritime Security in Odesa, Ukrainian Navy commander Admiral Ihor Voronchenko said that a Russian Tu-22M3 had been observed simulating the launch of a missile strike on the city, adding that Russian bombers had made several similar attempts during exercises on July 10, conducting a virtual airstrike 60 kilometers from Odesa.

== See also ==
- List of ship losses during the Russo-Ukrainian war

== Bibliography ==
- Felgenhauer, Tyler (1999), Ukraine, Russia, and the Black Sea Fleet accords, Woodrow Wilson School of Public and International Affairs, OCLC 41417451
