= Grisha-class corvette =

Soviet anti-submarine corvettes class

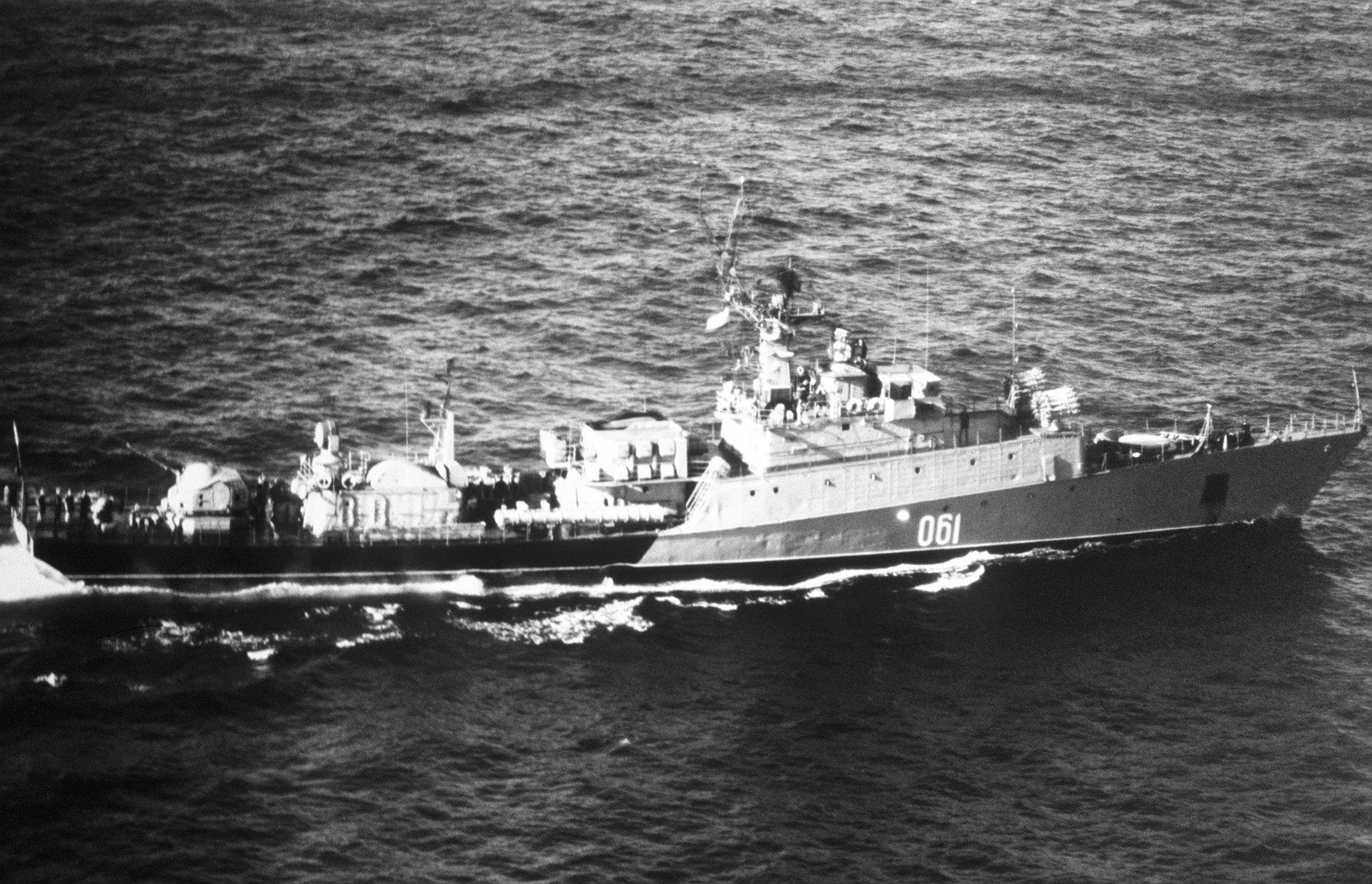
- Grisha I-class corvette

Class overview
- Name: Grisha class
- Builders: Zelenodolsk Gorky Plant (340), Zelenodolsk; Leninska Kuznya (302), Kiev; Kirov Shipyard (876), Khabarovsk; Eastern Shipyard (602), Vladivostok
- Operators: Soviet Navy (former); Soviet Border Troops (former); Russian Navy; Russian Coast Guard; Ukrainian Navy (former); Border Police of Georgia (former); Lithuanian Naval Force (former)
- Succeeded by: Gepard class; Steregushchiy class
- Planned: 92
- Completed: 86
- Cancelled: 6
- Active: 16 in Russian Navy as of 2025 (6 Pacific, 6 Northern, 4 Black Sea)
- Retired: 69

General characteristics
- Type: Anti-submarine corvette
- Displacement: Project 1124/P/M: 980 tons full load; Project 1124K: 1,070 tons full load
- Length: 71.6 m (235 ft)
- Beam: 9.8 m (32 ft)
- Draught: 3.7 m (12 ft)
- Propulsion: 3 shaft, 2 M-507A cruise diesels, 20,000 shp, (2 shafts); 1 boost gas turbine, 18,000 shp, (1 shaft); Electric Plant: 1 × 500 kW, 1 × 300 kW, and 1 × 200 kW diesel sets
- Speed: 34 knots (63 km/h; 39 mph)
- Range: 4,000 nautical miles (7,400 km; 4,600 mi) at 10 kn (19 km/h; 12 mph)
- Complement: 60
- Sensors & processing systems: 1 Don-2 navigation radar; 1 Strut Curve air/surface search radar; 1 Pop Group SA-N-4 fire control radar; 1 Muff Cob MR-103 fire control radar; Bull Nose low-frequency hull-mounted sonar; Elk Tail medium-frequency through-hull dipping sonar
- Electronic warfare & decoys: Bizan-4B suite with Watch Dog intercept
- Armament: 1 twin SA-N-4 Gecko surface-to-air missile launcher (20 missiles); 1 twin 57mm 70-caliber AK-725(ru) dual purpose guns; 2 RBU-6000 anti-submarine rocket launchers (96 rockets); 2 twin 533 mm torpedo tubes; 2 depth charge racks (12 depth charges); Up to 18 mines in place of depth charges

The Grisha class, Soviet designation Project 1124 Al'batros, are a series of anti-submarine corvettes built by the Soviet Union between 1970 and 1990 and later by Russia and Ukraine. These ships have a limited range and are largely used only in coastal waters. They have been equipped with a variety of anti-submarine weapons and an SA-N-4 'Gecko' surface-to-air missile launcher. All were fitted with retractable fin stabilizers.

The designation "corvette" for these ships was a conditional adaptation as the Soviet classification was a small anti-submarine ship (Russian: Малый противолодочный корабль, romanized: Malyy protivolodochnyy korabl, lit. 'Small anti-submarine ship') (MPK). In the Russian Navy, the Grishas are expected to be partially replaced by the Steregushchiy-class corvette.

== Variants ==
- Grisha I (1124.1) – 12 ships built between 1970 and 1974 and decommissioned by 1999
- The Grisha II class (1124P) were built for the KGB border guard and marked with P for pogranichnyi meaning "on the border". This class was built only in Zelenodolsk and Vladivostok. These ships had a second 57 mm gun mounting replacing the SA-N-4 missile system forward. 17 ships were built in the 1970s. Two were transferred to the Ukrainian Navy and some may remain in service with the Russian Maritime Border Guard.
- The Grisha III class (1124 2nd batch) were built in the late 1970s to early 1980s. These ships incorporated several small scale modifications, including a 30 mm gun and new electronics. Thirty four units were built. Two ships were in service with the Lithuanian Navy until 2009.
- A single Grisha IV class (1124K) ship was built in Zelenodolsk. This ship was a test ship for the SA-N-9 missile system and later was decommissioned.
- The Grisha V class (1124 M, 1124.4) ships were built between 1985 and 1994. This incorporated further modifications with the twin 57 mm guns being replaced by a single 76 mm gun. Thirty ships were built.
  - The Grisha V class (1124MU) ships were Ukrainian ships built after the dissolution of the Soviet Union among which is Ternopil that entered service in 2006 with the Ukrainian Navy.
  - Currently on the RF ships are being modernized "Tornado 2" combat complex for antisubmarine "Zapad" type missiles firing.
  - As of 2023, some 19 Grishas (mostly Grisha IIIs) remain active in the Russian Navy.

== Ships ==
Name	Builders	Laid down	Launched	Commissioned	Fleet	Status	Notes
Project 1124 (Grisha I)
MPK-147	Zelenodolsk	26 December 1966	11 December 1967	31 August 1970	Black Sea	Decommissioned 19 September 1994	
MPK-5	Zelenodolsk	30 December 1967	16 October 1968	31 October 1970	Black Sea	Decommissioned 24 August 1993	
MPK-131	Zelenodolsk	25 May 1968	4 July 1969	30 December 1970	Northern	Decommissioned 31 January 1991	
MPK-133	Zelenodolsk	4 October 1968	17 December 1969	15 September 1971	Northern	Decommissioned 11 February 1994	
MPK-33	Zelenodolsk	23 May 1969	30 April 1970	24 December 1971	Northern	Decommissioned 7 February 1995	
MPK-47	Zelenodolsk	5 September 1969	17 July 1970	30 December 1971	Northern	Decommissioned 31 December 1991	
MPK-65	Zelenodolsk	10 July 1970	5 February 1971	30 September 1972	Northern	Decommissioned 19 April 1990	
MPK-3	Zelenodolsk	12 October 1970	9 July 1971	29 December 1972	Northern	Decommissioned 20 April 1991	
MPK-8	Zelenodolsk	3 March 1971	30 January 1972	28 September 1973	Black Sea	Decommissioned 3 July 1992	
MPK-43	Zelenodolsk	1 August 1972	2 June 1973	28 December 1974	Black Sea	Decommissioned in 1999	Renamed Odesskiy Komsomolets (5 April 1983); Renamed MPK-43 (15 February 1992); Transferred to Ukraine in 1990s Renamed Sumy (1 August 1997)
MPK-40	Zelenodolsk	28 April 1973	23 May 1974	30 September 1975	Northern	Decommissioned 25 January 1994	
MPK-138	Zelenodolsk	26 March 1975	11 May 1976	31 December 1976	Northern	Decommissioned 3 July 1992	
MPK-141	Zelenodolsk	3 July 1976	16 April 1977	30 September 1977	Northern (Black Sea until 21 September 1978)	Decommissioned 5 July 1994	
MPK-152	Zelenodolsk	18 November 1976	18 June 1976	30 December 1977	Northern (Black Sea until 21 September 1978)	Decommissioned 5 July 1994	
MPK-161	Zelenodolsk	1 October 1977	6 May 1978	30 December 1978	Baltic	Decommissioned 31 July 1996	
MPK-2	Zelenodolsk	10 February 1978	24 March 1979	28 November 1979	Baltic	Decommissioned 17 July 1997	
MPK-49	Zelenodolsk	23 March 1980	14 February 1982	31 August 1982	Black Sea (Baltic until 8 August 1984)	Decommissioned 2022	Renamed Aleksandrovets (29 August 2004)
MPK-52	Kuznya na Rybalskomu	30 October 1968	30 May 1971	31 December 1971	Black Sea	Decommissioned 11 June 1999	Transferred to Ukraine in 1990s Renamed Kherson (1 August 1997)
MPK-31	Kuznya na Rybalskomu	30 September 1969	8 April 1973	30 September 1973	Northern (Black Sea until 5 July 1974)	Decommissioned 7 February 1995	
MPK-127	Kuznya na Rybalskomu	16 September 1974	10 July 1976	27 December 1976	Black Sea	Decommissioned 22 June 2005	Renamed Komsomolets Gruzii (26 August 1980); Renamed MPK-127 (15 February 1992)
MPK-6	Kuznya na Rybalskomu	15 July 1976	3 June 1978	12 December 1978	Black Sea	Decommissioned 16 March 1998	
MPK-36	Khabarovsk	1970		31 December 1972	Pacific	Decommissioned 30 June 1993	
MPK-41	Khabarovsk	12 April 1971	22 August 1972	31 December 1972	Pacific	Decommissioned 30 June 1993	
MPK-117	Khabarovsk	19 April 1972	8 September 1973	31 December 1973	Pacific	Decommissioned 28 February 1992	
MPK-81	Khabarovsk	26 March 1973	10 August 1974	31 December 1974	Pacific	Decommissioned 11 February 1994	
MPK-122	Khabarovsk	27 April 1974	23 August 1975	31 December 1975	Pacific	Decommissioned 5 July 1994	
MPK-143	Khabarovsk	25 February 1975	3 September 1976	31 December 1976	Pacific	Decommissioned 17 July 1997	
MPK-145	Khabarovsk	29 October 1975	11 June 1977	30 November 1977	Pacific	Decommissioned 4 August 1995	
MPK-170	Khabarovsk	31 May 1976	30 September 1977	14 October 1978	Pacific	Decommissioned 31 July 1996	
MPK-4	Khabarovsk	27 November 1976	15 May 1978	27 July 1979	Pacific	Decommissioned 17 July 1997	
MPK-101	Khabarovsk	31 May 1977	3 October 1978	23 December 1979	Pacific	Decommissioned 16 March 1998	Renamed Zaporozhskiy Komsomolets (3 November 1989); Renamed MPK-101 (15 February 1992)
MPK-155	Khabarovsk	20 December 1977	29 May 1979	30 September 1980	Pacific	Decommissioned 5 July 1994	
MPK-37	Khabarovsk	31 May 1978	20 October 1979	19 December 1980	Pacific	Decommissioned 4 August 1995	
MPK-178	Khabarovsk	30 November 1982	8 May 1984	21 December 1984	Pacific	Decommissioned in 2012 (sunk as target ship in 2013)	
MPK-191	Khabarovsk	30 November 1982	7 May 1985	21 November 1985	Pacific	Active with Russian Navy	Renamed Kholmsk (1 June 2006)
Project 1124P (Grisha II)
Brilliant	Zelenodolsk	1 February 1972	19 October 1972	25 December 1973	Northern	Decommissioned 13 March 1995	
Zhemchug	Zelenodolsk	28 March 1972	14 January 1973	30 August 1974	Northern	Decommissioned 4 October 1995	
Izumrud	Zelenodolsk	8 February 1973	3 February 1974	28 December 1974	Northern	Decommissioned 2012	
Rubin	Zelenodolsk	22 December 1973	17 November 1974	31 December 1975	Northern	Decommissioned 15 June 1992	
Almaz	Zelenodolsk	10 June 1974	12 July 1975	31 December 1975	Northern	Decommissioned 23 May 1997	Renamed Ametist (September 1975)
Dnepr	Zelenodolsk	23 December 1975	12 September 1976	31 December 1976	Black Sea	Decommissioned 29 January 2021	Transferred to Ukraine in 1990s Renamed Vinnitsa (19 January 1996); Renamed A206 (April 2018); reported scuttled during Russian invasion of Ukraine
Sapfir	Zelenodolsk	4 May 1977	31 January 1978	31 July 1978	Northern	Decommissioned 13 June 1998	
Izmail	Zelenodolsk	12 September 1978	22 June 1980	28 December 1980	Black Sea	Decommissioned 30 November 2004	Transferred to Ukraine in 1990s Renamed Chernigov (19 January 1996); Renamed Izmail (26 July 2004)
Provorny	Zelenodolsk	21 june 1980	30 July 1982	30 December 1982	Northern (Baltic until 1991)	Decommissioned 4 August 1998	
Predanny	Zelenodolsk	18 March 1982	16 April 1983	30 September 1983	Northern (Baltic until 1991)	Decommissioned 2002	
Nadezhny	Zelenodolsk	19 September 1982	25 February 1984	20 September 1984	Northern	Decommissioned 2002	
Dozorny	Zelenodolsk	1982	1985	26 December 1985	Northern	Decommissioned 2009	
Bditelny	Khabarovsk	1979	18 April 1981	25 September 1981	Pacific	Decommissioned 13 June 1998	
Bezuprechny	Khabarovsk	1979	1981	19 December 1981	Pacific	Decommissioned 2015	
Zorky	Khabarovsk	15 February 1980	2 November 1981	29 October 1982	Pacific	Decommissioned 20 June 2006	
Reshitelny	Khabarovsk	28 October 1980	18 September 1982	31 August 1983	Pacific	Decommissioned 13 June 1998	
Smely	Khabarovsk	27 May 1981	7 April 1983	15 December 1983	Pacific	Decommissioned 2015	
Bravy	Vladivostok	1988				Not Completed	
Verny	Vladivostok	1988				Not Completed	
Strogy	Vladivostok	1988				Not Completed	
Project 1124M (Grisha III)
MPK-44	Kuznya na Rybalskomu	18 July 1977	29 March 1980	25 October 1980	Baltic	Decommissioned 22 October 2008	Renamed Komsomolets Latvii (30 September 1983); Transferred to Lithuania in 1990s Renamed MPK-44 (15 February 1992); Renamed Zemaitis (28 April 1993)
MPK-108	Zelenodolsk	14 May 1979	6 February 1981	25 September 1981	Baltic	Decommissioned in April 2010	Transferred to Lithuania in 1990s Renamed Aukstaitis (28 April 1993)
MPK-64	Kuznya na Rybalskomu	30 March 1980	27 March 1982	10 December 1982	Black Sea	Active with Russian Navy	Renamed Kievskiy Komsomolets (27 July 1982); Renamed MPK-134 (15 February 1992); Renamed Muromets (5 April 1999)
MPK-118	Kuznya na Rybalskomu	1 August 1981	27 March 1983	3 October 1983	Black Sea	Active with Russian Navy	Renamed Komsomolets Moldavii (10 April 1984); Renamed MPK-118 (15 February 1992); Renamed Suzdalets (5 April 1999)
MPK-139	Kuznya na Rybalskomu	8 April 1982	18 February 1984	2 August 1984	Northern	Decommissioned 22 June 2005	
MPK-190	Kuznya na Rybalskomu	5 April 1983	20 January 1985	8 August 1985	Northern	Decommissioned 16 March 1998	
MPK-199	Kuznya na Rybalskomu	20 February 1984	7 December 1985	7 October 1986	Black Sea	Active with Russian Navy	Renamed Komsomolets Armenii (18 December 1985); Renamed MPK-199 (15 February 1992); Renamed Kasimov (2001)
MPK-202	Kuznya na Rybalskomu	22 January 1985	10 November 1986	6 October 1987	Northern	Decommissioned 16 March 1998	
MPK-113	Kuznya na Rybalskomu	12 November 1985	31 July 1987	5 August 1988	Northern	Decommissioned 1 June 2001	
MPK-207	Kuznya na Rybalskomu	12 June 1986	6 May 1988	3 April 1989	Black Sea	Decommissioned 2022	Renamed Povorino
MPK-217	Kuznya na Rybalskomu	16 March 1987	12 April 1989	26 December 1989	Black Sea	Active with Russian Navy	Renamed Eysk (9 September 1999)
MPK-214	Kuznya na Rybalskomu	20 August 1987	30 March 1990	29 September 1990	Pacific	Active with Russian Navy	Renamed Leninskaya Kuznitsa (2 February 1990); Renamed MPK-125 (15 February 1992); Renamed Sovetskaya Gavan (12 November 2005)
MPK-82	Kuznya na Rybalskomu	20 April 1989	20 April 1991	26 September 1991	Pacific	Active with Russian Navy	
MPK-142	Zelenodolsk	20 February 1982	19 May 1984	30 December 1984	Northern	Decommissioned 16 March 1998	
MPK-198	Zelenodolsk	3 August 1984	27 April 1986	29 December 1986	Northern	Decommissioned 16 March 1998	
MPK-69	Zelenodolsk	4 April 1985	2 May 1987	29 December 1987	Northern	Decommissioned 16 March 1998	
MPK-194	Zelenodolsk	11 May 1987	30 July 1988	27 September 1988	Northern	Active with Russian Navy	Renamed Brestskiy Komsomolets (22 July 1988); Renamed MPK-194 (15 February 1992); Renamed Brest (July 2000)
MPK-196	Zelenodolsk	11 May 1987	30 July 1988	30 December 1988	Northern	Decommissioned in 2002	
MPK-197	Zelenodolsk	27 October 1987	8 April 1989	25 October 1989		Decommissioned 3 May 2001	
MPK-203	Zelenodolsk	26 March 1988	19 July 1989	28 December 1989	Northern	Active with Russian Navy	Renamed Yunga (2 February 1990)
Arkhangelskiy Komsomolets	Zelenodolsk	17 August 1988	9 March 1990	28 September 1990	Northern	Active with Russian Navy	Renamed MPK-130 (15 February 1992); Renamed Naryan-Mar (2002)
MPK-56	Zelenodolsk	12 April 1989	30 June 1990	29 December 1990	Northern	Decommissioned 22 June 2005	
MPK-7	Zelenodolsk	20 April 1989	30 June 1990	28 December 1990	Northern	Active with Russian Navy	Renamed Onega (June 2003)
MPK-10	Zelenodolsk	19 March 1990	27 July 1991	28 December 1991	Northern	Decommissioned 1 June 2006	
MPK-14	Zelenodolsk	27 March 1991	6 June 1992	31 May 1993	Northern	Active with Russian Navy	Renamed Monchegorsk (17 August 1999)
MPK-59	Zelenodolsk	20 November 1990	22 May 1993	12 August 1994	Northern	Active with Russian Navy	Renamed Snezhnogorsk
MPK-200	Khabarovsk	8 February 1985	29 April 1987	29 December 1987	Pacific	Decommissioned 16 December 2023	Renamed Primorskiy Komsomolets (11 August 1987); Renamed MPK-221 (15 February 1992)
MPK-89	Khabarovsk	27 January 1986	3 November 1987	13 December 1988	Pacific	Decommissioned 17 July 1997	
MPK-222	Khabarovsk	7 January 1987	27 April 1989	20 December 1989	Pacific	Reported decommissioned October 2025	Renamed Koreets (24 November 2003)
MPK-28	Khabarovsk	2 September 1987	9 September 1989	27 December 1989	Pacific	Decommissioned 22 June 2005	
Irkutskiy Komsomolets	Khabarovsk	22 February 1988	5 June 1990	14 December 1990	Pacific	Active with Russian Navy	Renamed MPK-107 (15 February 1992)
MPK-64	Khabarovsk	4 January 1988	2 October 1990	31 December 1990	Pacific	Active with Russian Navy	Renamed Metel (1 October 2003)
MPK-17	Khabarovsk	22 January 1990	28 August 1991	30 December 1991	Pacific	Active with Russian Navy	Renamed Ust-Ilimsk (16 January 2010)
MPK-20	Khabarovsk	1990				Not Completed	
Project 1124K (Grisha IV)
MPK-104	Zelenodolsk	12 June 1979	23 March 1980	30 October 1980	Black Sea	Decommissioned 16 March 1998	
Project 1124 MU (Grisha V)
MPK-85	Kuznya na Rybalskomu	11 January 1991	22 May 1993	30 December 1993	Black Sea	Captured by Russia during the annexation of Crimea; status unknown	Completed for Ukraine; Renamed Lutsk (July 1994)
Ternopil	Kuznya na Rybalskomu	23 April 1991	15 March 2002	28 December 2005	Black Sea	Captured by Russia during the annexation of Crimea; Used as an exercise target for the fleet.	Completed for Ukraine
Lviv	Kuznya na Rybalskomu					Not Completed	
Zaporozhskaya Sech	Kuznya na Rybalskomu					Not Completed	

== Gallery ==
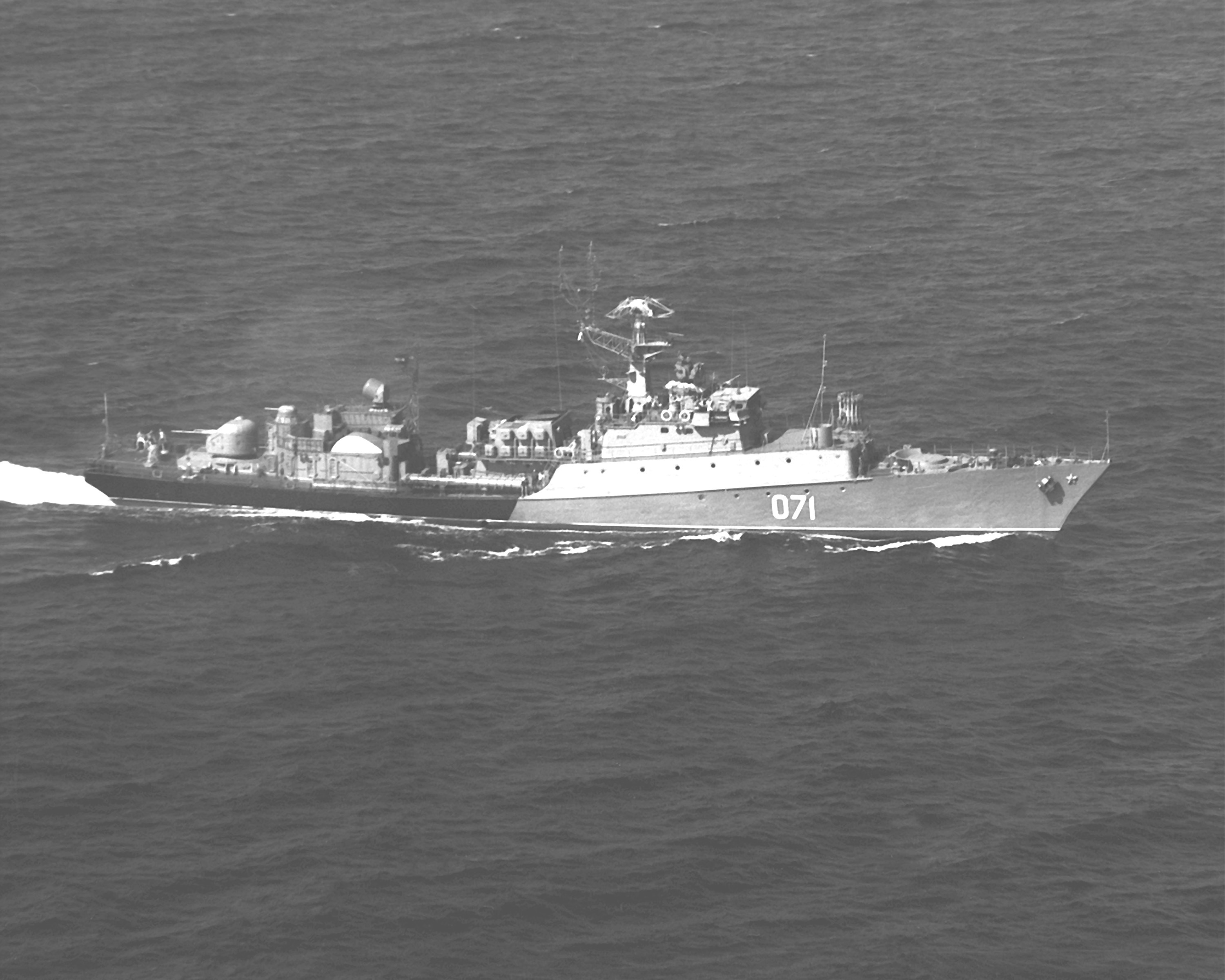
Grisha V-class corvette

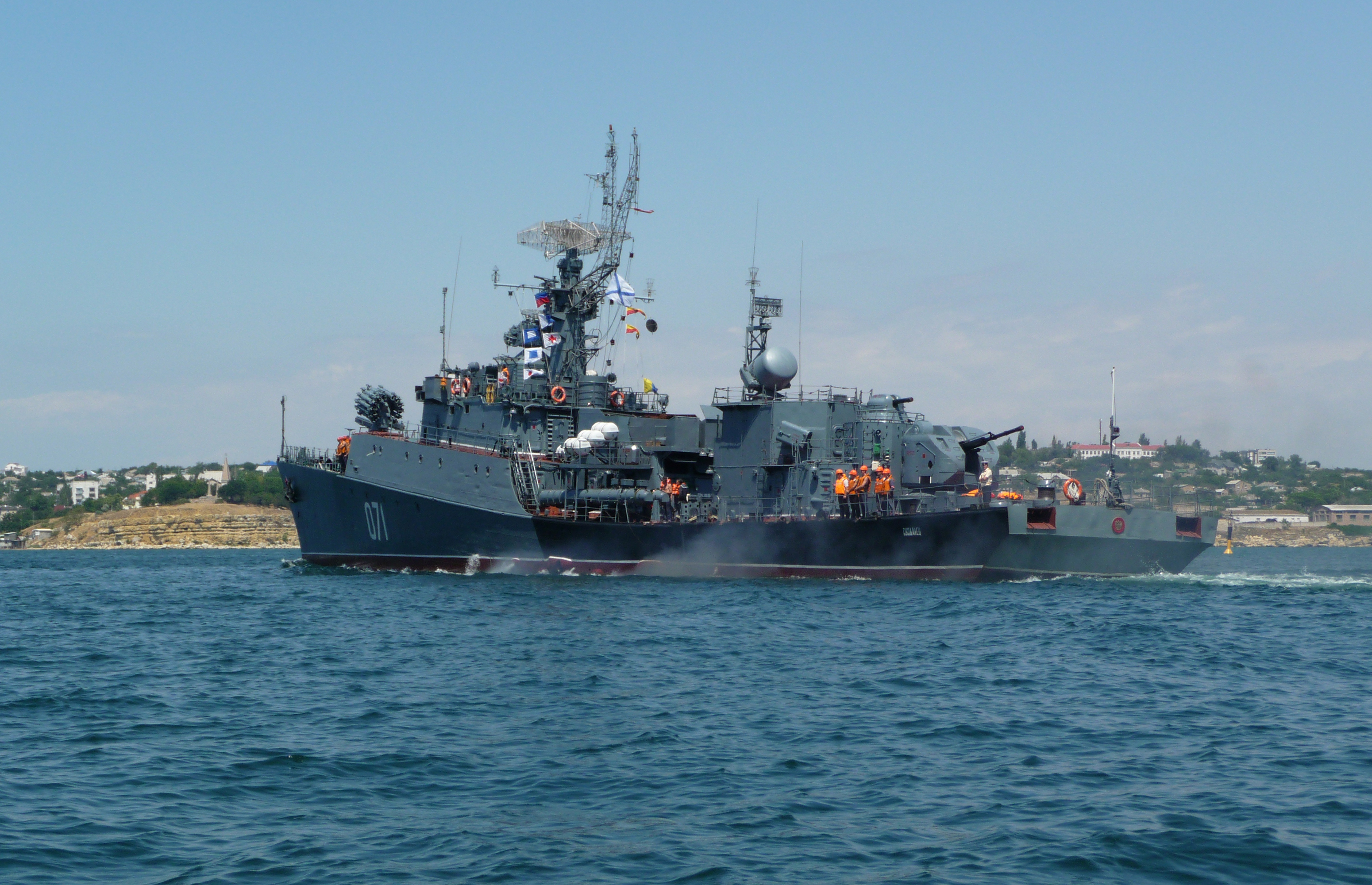
Grisha V-class corvette MPK-118 Suzdalets.

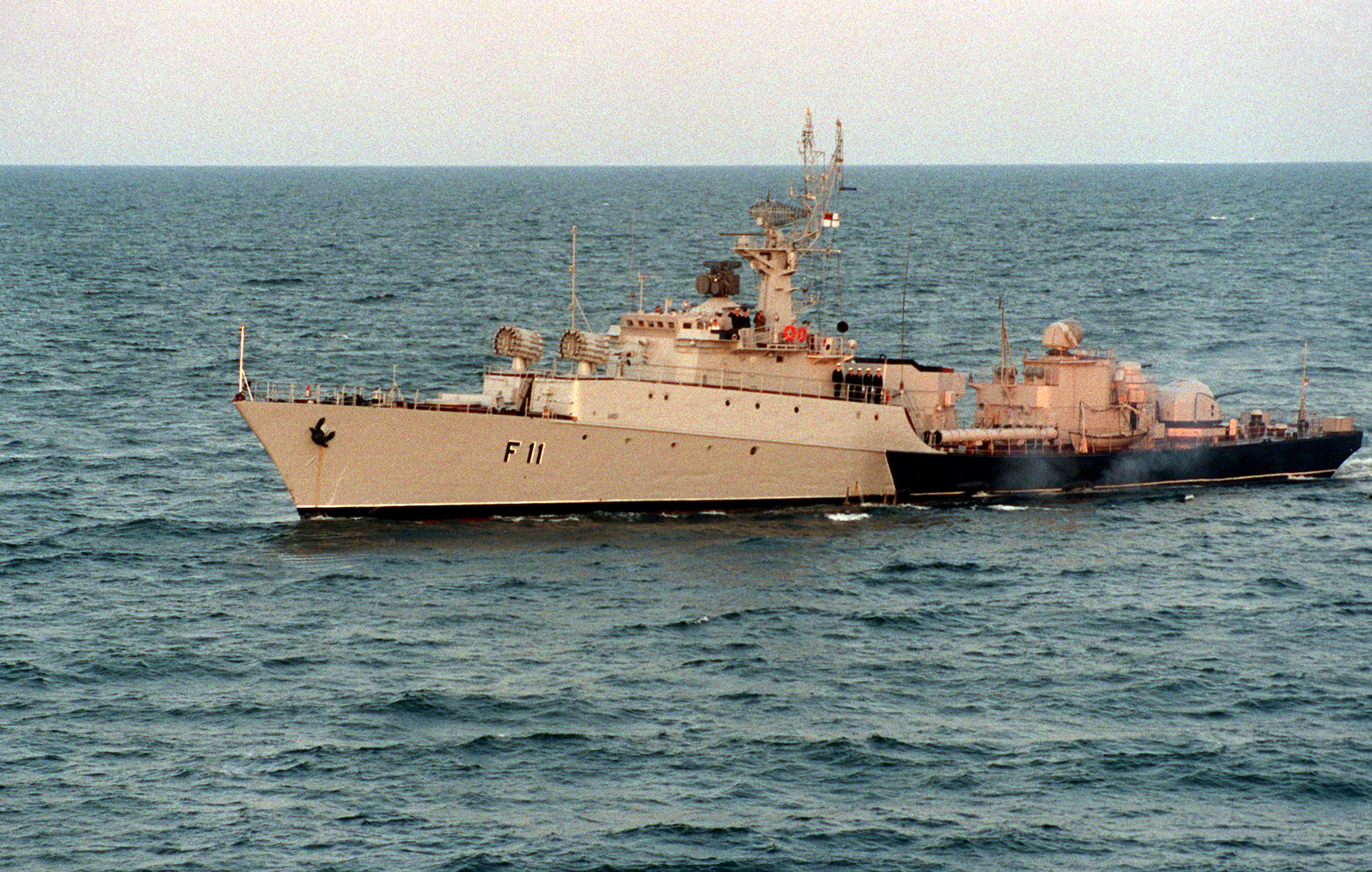
Grisha III-class corvette Žemaitis (Lithuanian Navy, 2003)

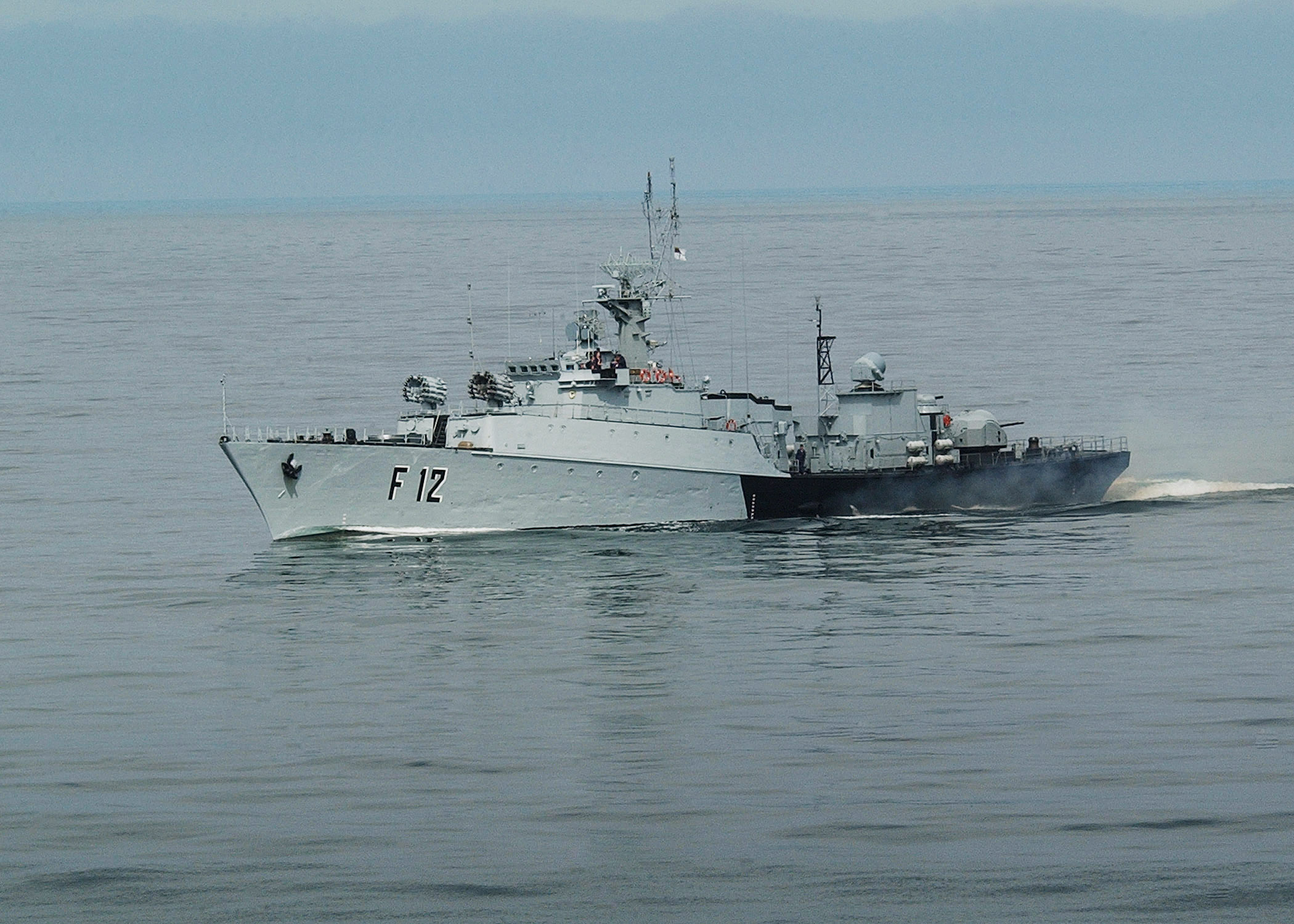
Grisha III-class corvette Aukštaitis (Lithuanian Navy, 2003)

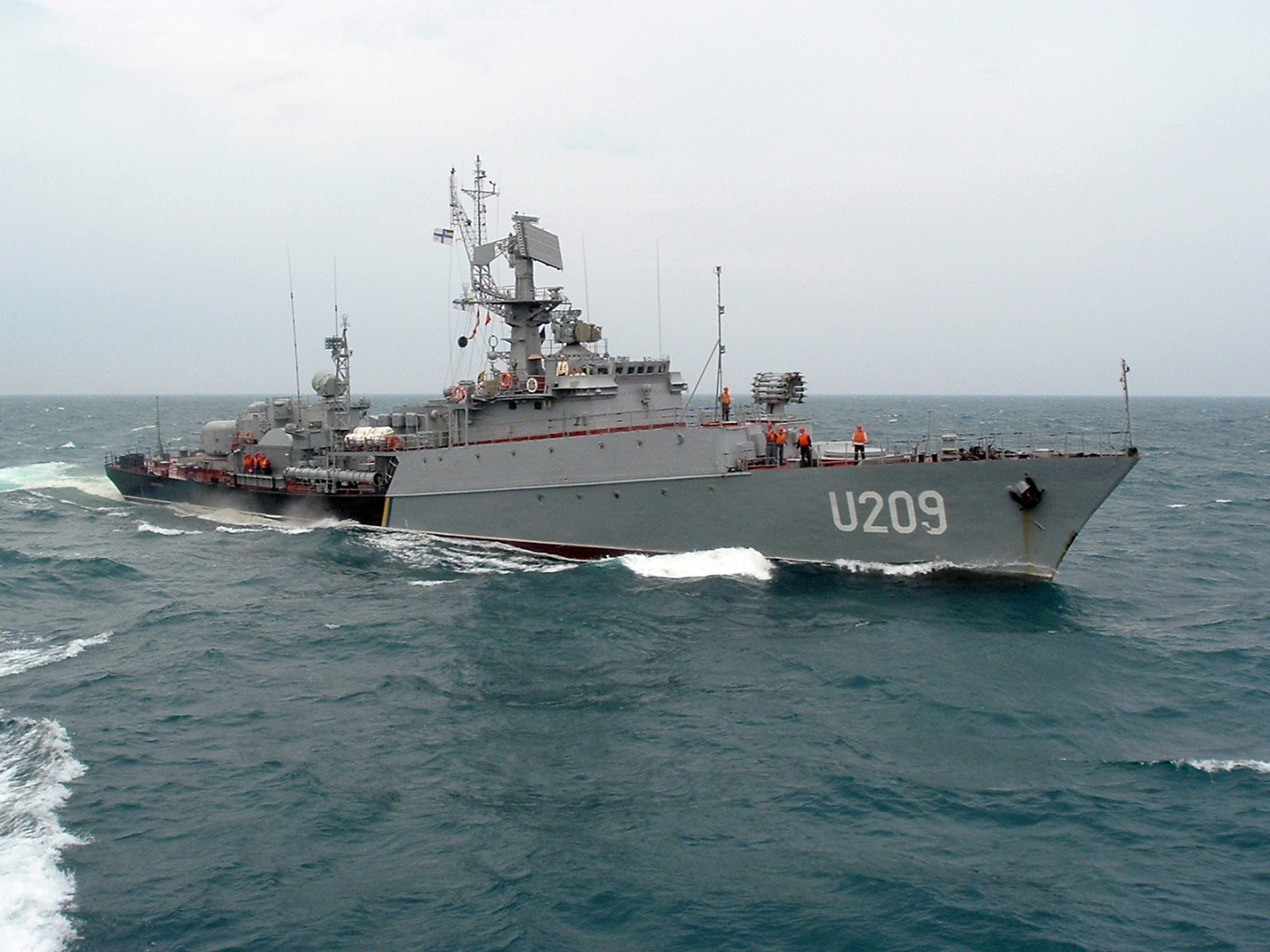
Grisha V (Ukrainian Navy, 2013)

== See also ==
- List of ships of the Soviet Navy
- List of ships of Russia by project number
