= Russian corvette Askold =

Russian corvette Askold may refer to:

- Russian corvette Askold (1863) - 17-guns steam corvette of the Imperial Russian Navy launched in 1863
- Russian corvette Askold (2021) - Karakurt-class corvette of the Russian Navy launched in 2021.
