= Saturn-class tugboat =

Soviet ship class

The Saturn class, Russian designation Project 498, also called Proteus (Russian: Протей, Protey), is a series of Soviet/Russian tugboats built for use in harbours and roadsteads. Project 498 boats were built from 1962 until 1983, after which production switched to an upgraded version, Project 04983. They have been used for both civil and naval purposes. A few have been exported to other countries.

== Operational history ==
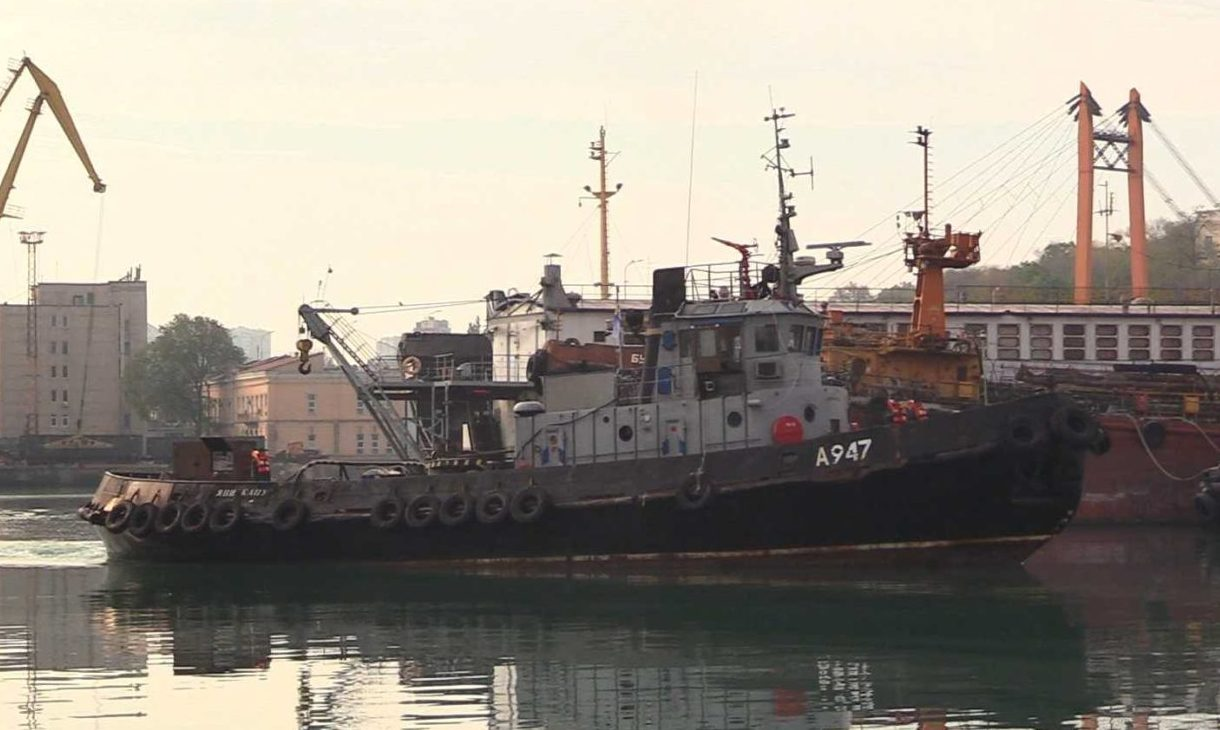
Yany Kapu in the Port of Odesa for repair in 2020

The Kerch Strait incident of 25 November 2018 unfolded when Yany Kapu, a Ukrainian Saturn-class tugboat, and two Ukrainian gunboats attempted to transit through Kerch Strait. Russian boats rammed Yany Kapu and that evening seized the three Ukrainian boats, returning them to Ukraine nearly a year later.

A Saturn-class tugboat in the Black Sea Fleet of the Russian Navy was sunk in Crimea on 6 June 2024 by the Ukrainian military amid the Russian invasion of Ukraine.
