= MV Azburg =

Dominica-flagged container ship

History
- Name: Azburg
- Owner: MSCO Global Ltd., Valletta
- Port of registry: Portsmouth, Dominica
- Builder: Ferus Smit Scheepswerf
- Yard number: 299
- Launched: 15 September 1995
- Completed: 1995
- Identification: IMO number: 9102899
- Fate: Sunk by Russian shelling in Mariupol on 5 April 2022

General characteristics
- Type: General cargo ship
- Tonnage: 6,353 GT, 9,085 DWT
- Length: 130.65 m (428 ft 8 in)
- Beam: 15.87 m (52 ft 1 in)
- Draught: 7.45 m (24 ft 5 in)
- Installed power: 5,200 bhp (3,900 kW)
- Crew: 12

MV Azburg was a Dominica-flagged general cargo ship that was sunk by Russian shelling while in port at Mariupol, Ukraine, on 5 April during the 2022 Russian invasion of Ukraine. It was built in The Netherlands in 1995 as Kroonborg.

== Description ==
Azburg was a cargo ship with a gross tonnage of 6,353 tons. The ship was 130 metres (430 ft) long and 15 metres (49 ft) wide, and its engines provided 3,450 KW of power. At the time of its sinking, it had a total crew of twelve.

== History ==
The ship was built by the Dutch shipbuilding company Ferus Smit Scheepswerf at Hoogezand, The Netherlands in 1995 for the Dutch operator Wagenborg Shipping as Kroonborg and the first of their fleet to trade across the Atlantic. Its name was changed to Azburg in 2013 when sold to the Turkish operator Albros Denizcilik ve Ticaret. In 2020 the ship was sold to a Maltese company, MSCo Global, without change of name. MSCo Global is connected with the Ukrainian company Dneprtrans PC, of Kherson.

=== Sinking ===
Azburg arrived in the port of Mariupol on 23 February 2022, just before the outbreak of the Russian invasion of Ukraine, which caused its inability to leave. At around 10 P.M. on 4 April, the vessel came under heavy fire from Russian artillery shells and missiles. One crewmember was injured, the engine room caught fire, and the pilothouse was destroyed. The fire began to spread, and the ship started to sink. Because of the unsafe conditions aboard Azburg, the captain issued a distress call and the Ukrainian Sea Guard helped to move the crew to nearby vessels. Azburg sank in the harbor shortly after the crew was evacuated.

In response, the Commonwealth of Dominica Maritime Administration condemned the sinking of the ship and called for Russia to cease its attacks on maritime shipping in Ukraine.
