= Ukrainian corvette Lutsk =

Anti-submarine corvette of the Ukrainian Navy

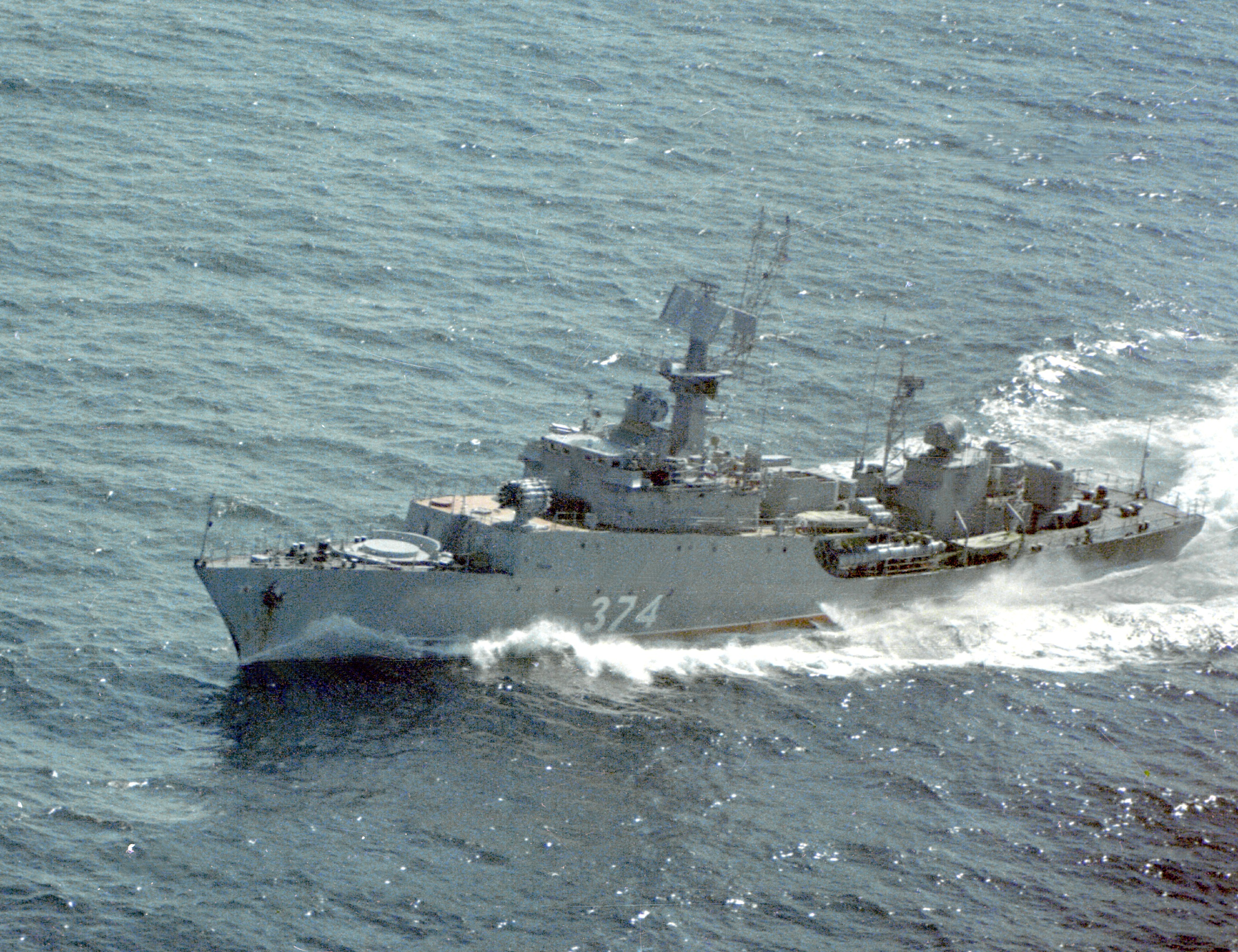
- A Soviet Grisha V-class small ASW ship

History

Ukraine
- Name: Lutsk
- Namesake: Lutsk
- Builder: JSC Leninska Kuznya, (Kyiv)
- Yard number: С-012
- Laid down: 11 January 1991
- Launched: 22 May 1993
- Commissioned: 14 October 1993
- In service: 30 December 1993
- Home port: Naval Station Novoozerne; (Donuzlav Lake), Crimea
- Identification: U205
- Status: Unclear as of March 2014
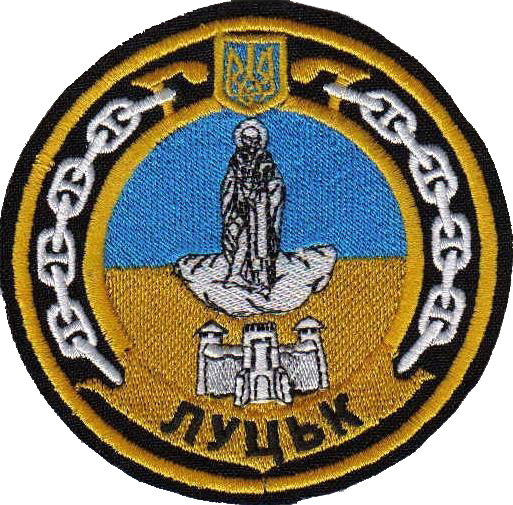
- Badge

General characteristics
- Class & type: Grisha V class corvette
- Displacement: standard 876 tons, full load 1030 tons
- Length: 71.2 m (233 ft 7 in)
- Beam: 10.15 m (33 ft 4 in)
- Draught: 3.53 m (11 ft 7 in)
- Propulsion: 3 shaft, 2 × М-507А cruise diesels, 28,000 kW (38,000 shp), (2 shafts); 1 × М-8М boost gas turbine 13,000 kW (18,000 shp), (1 shaft); Electric Plant: 1×DG-500 (500 kW (670 hp)), 1×DG-300 (300 kW (400 hp)), 1×DG-200 (200 kW (270 hp))
- Speed: full 32 kn (59 km/h; 37 mph), economic 14 kn (26 km/h; 16 mph)
- Range: 2,500 nautical miles (4,600 km; 2,900 mi) at 14 kn (26 km/h; 16 mph)
- Endurance: 9 days
- Complement: 89 (9 officers)
- Sensors & processing systems: Radar: MR-755 Fregat-MA-1 air/surface search radar; 4R-33MA Pop Group SA-N-4 fire control radar; MR-123-01 AK-176 fire control radar; Don-2 navigation radar; Sonar: MGK-335MC Platina/Bull Horn low-frequency hull-mounted sonar; Shelon'/Elk Tail medium-frequency through-hull dipping sonar
- Electronic warfare & decoys: Bizan-4B suite with Watch Dog intercept, 2 PK-16 decoy RL
- Armament: air-defense gun-missile systems: AD Osa-M missile system — 1 twin SA-N-4 Gecko surface-to-air missile launcher (20 missiles); Strela-3 ADM system — 2 SA-N-8 Gremlin surface-to-air missile (8 missiles); artillery: 76mm AK-176 gun mount (304 rounds); 1 × 6 30mm AK-630 AD gun mount (3,000 rounds); antisubmarine: 2 twin 533 mm torpedo tubes DTA-5E-1124; 2 RBU-6000 A/S rocket launchers (96 rockets); 2 depth charge racks (12 depth charges); Up to 18 mines in place of depth charges

Lutsk (Луцьк) was an anti-submarine corvette of the Ukrainian Navy. Board number U205 (to July 1994 was number 400, from 1994 until January 2007 – U200). In March 2014 Lutsk was captured by Russian forces during the annexation of Crimea.

== History ==
Lutsk is the ship 1124ME project (NATO reporting name: Grisha V class, in the Soviet classification: Albatros class Russian: Альбатрос).

The Russian type designation is Small Anti-Submarine Ship. The Grisha-class anti-submarine ship was designed to search for and destroy enemy submarines found in coastal areas. They were equipped with a variety of ASW weapons and an SA-N-4 surface-to-air missile launcher. All were fitted with retractable fin stabilizers. Some of them (the Grisha II class) were built for the border guards.

The Grisha V-class ships were built between 1985 and 2002. This incorporated further modifications with the twin 57-millimetre (2.2 in) guns being replaced by a single 76-millimetre (3.0 in) gun. Thirty ships were built. About 28 ships remain in the Russian Navy. Two ships — Lutsk and Ternopil were built in Ukraine. Lutsk was launched on 22 May 1993 and alongside Ternopil, entered service on 16 February 2006 with the Ukrainian Navy.

On 20 March 2014, Lutsk was captured by Russian forces during the annexation of Crimea. The ship was scheduled to be handed back to Ukraine in May 2014. But as of 6 August 2014 it was not; Russia suspended the return of Ukrainian Navy materials from Crimea to Ukraine proper because Ukraine did not renew its unilaterally declared ceasefire on 1 July 2014 in the War in Donbas.

== Service ==
The corvette was laid down on 11 January 1991 at the Leninska Kuznya shipyard. The actual building of the ship started on 27 December 1992 and the ship was launched on 22 May 1993.

The ship's crew began to move in on 14 October 1993. The corvette was moved from Kyiv to Mykolaiv between 4 and 16 November 1993. Five days later the corvette was moved again, this time to a port of Sevastopol. On 30 December 1993 an act was signed turning the ship over to the Ukrainian Navy. The Ukrainian naval flag was raised on the ship on 12 February 1994.

In January 2002 the corvette was added to Joint Rapid Reaction Force.

Beginning on 5 March 2014, Lutsk was blockaded in Streletska Bay at Sevastopol by Russian vessels. On 20 March 2014, Lutsk surrendered to the Black Sea Fleet and the Ukrainian personnel left the vessel.

== Activity ==
- July 1994 — the naval multinational exercise Breeze—94 (Bulgaria),
- August 1995 — the naval multinational exercise Breeze—95 (Bulgaria),
- August 1996 — the strategic exercise Sea—96,
- January 1997 — the first in the history of Naval Forces of Ukraine missile firing,
- April 1997 — the Ukrainian-Russian naval exercise,
- July 1997 — the naval multinational exercise Cooperative Partner—97 (Bulgaria),
- August 1997 — the naval multinational Exercise Sea Breeze—97,
- November 1997 — the Ukrainian-Russian naval exercise,
- April 1998 — the Ukrainian-Russian naval exercise,
- June 1998 — the naval multinational exercise Cooperative Partner—98 (Romania),
- November 1998 — the naval multinational exercise Sea Breeze—98,
- April 1999 — naval tactical exercises,
- August 1999 — the Ukrainian-Russian naval exercise Farvater Miru—99 (English: Fairway peace—99),
- September 1999 — the strategic exercise Duel—99,
- April 2000 — naval tactical exercises,
- June 2000 — the naval multinational exercise Cooperative Partner—2000,
- July 2000 — the naval multinational exercise Breeze—2000,
- September 2000 — the naval multinational exercise Black Sea Partner—2000 Turkey,
- 2001 — the naval multinational exercise Farvater Miru—2001, strategic exercise Duel—2001,
- 2002 — the naval multinational exercise Breeze—2002, naval tactical exercises,
- 2003 — the naval multinational exercises Farvater Miru—2003, Cooperative Partner—2003, Black Sea Partner—2003,
- 2004 — the naval multinational exercise Cooperative Partner—2004, naval tactical exercises,
- 2005 — the strategic exercise Reaction—2005,
- 2007 — took part in NATO Active Endeavour anti-terrorist operation,
- 2008 — the strategic exercise Morsky vusol—2008 English: Nautical knot—2008
