= Ukrainian corvette Ternopil =

Ukrainian Grisha-class anti-submarine corvette

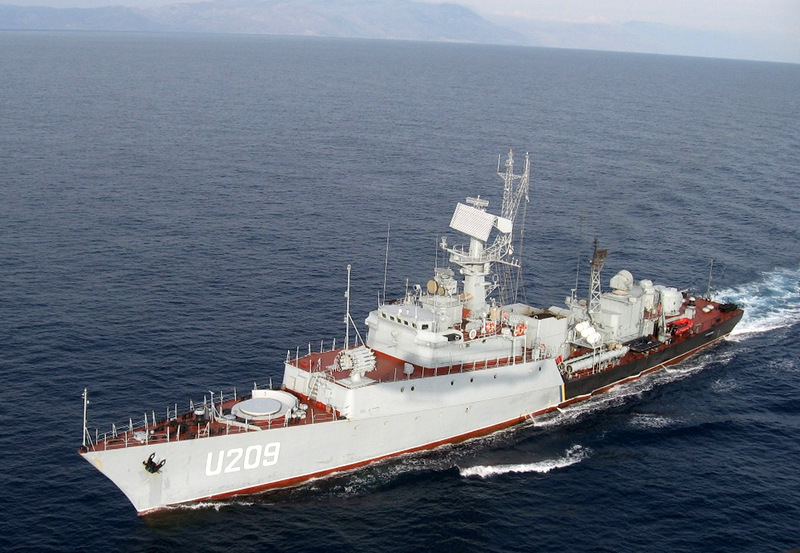
- Ternopil in 2006

History

Ukraine
- Name: Ternopil
- Namesake: Ternopil
- Builder: JSC Leninska Kuznya, (Kyiv)
- Yard number: С-013
- Laid down: 15 April 1991
- Launched: 15 March 2002
- Acquired: 2 February 2006
- Commissioned: 16 February 2006
- Home port: Donuzlav
- Identification: Pennant number: U209
- Captured: 20 March 2014 by Russia
- Fate: Sunk as a target, 20 July 2023
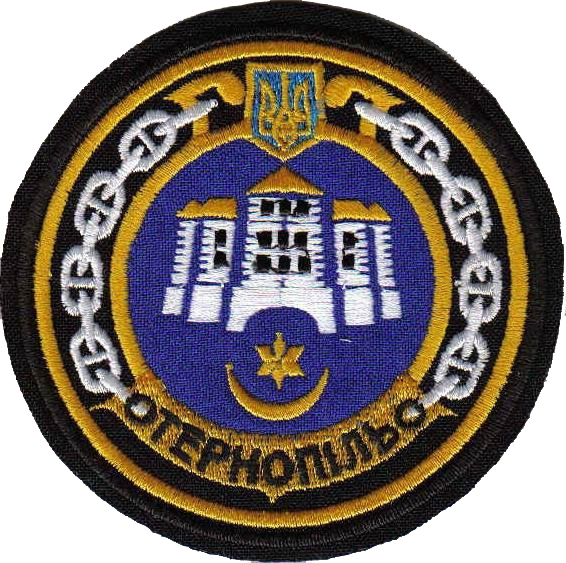
- Badge

General characteristics
- Class & type: Grisha V-class corvette
- Displacement: Standard 876 t (862 long tons); Full load 1,030 t (1,010 long tons)
- Length: 71.2 m (233 ft 7 in)
- Beam: 10.15 m (33 ft 4 in)
- Draught: 3.53 m (11 ft 7 in)
- Propulsion: 3 shaft, 2 × М-507А cruise diesels, 28,000 kW (38,000 shp), (2 shafts); 1 × М-8М boost gas turbine 13,000 kW (18,000 shp), (1 shaft); Electric plant: 1 × DG-500 (500 kW), 1 × DG-300 (300 kW), 1 × DG-200 (200 kW)
- Speed: Max 32 knots (59 km/h; 37 mph)
- Range: 2,500 nmi (4,600 km; 2,900 mi) at 14 knots (26 km/h; 16 mph)
- Endurance: 9 days
- Complement: 89 (9 officers)
- Sensors & processing systems: Radar: MR-755 Fregat-MA-1 air/surface-search radar; 4R-33MA Pop Group SA-N-4 fire-control radar; MR-123-01 AK-176 fire-control radar; Don-2 navigation radar; Sonar: MGK-335MC Platina/Bull Horn low-frequency hull-mounted sonar; Shelon'/Elk Tail medium-frequency through-hull dipping sonar
- Electronic warfare & decoys: Bizan-4B suite with Watch Dog intercept, 2 PK-16 decoy RL
- Armament: Air-defense gun-missile systems: AD Osa-M missile system – 1 twin SA-N-4 Gecko surface-to-air missile launcher (20 missiles); Strela-3 ADM system – 2 SA-N-8 Gremlin surface-to-air missile (8 missiles); Artillery: 76 mm AK-176 gun mount (304 rounds); 1 × 6 30 mm AK-630 AD gun mount (3,000 rounds); Anti-submarine: 2 twin 533 mm torpedo tubes DTA-5E-1124; 2 RBU-6000 A/S rocket launchers (96 rockets); 2 depth charge racks (12 depth charges); Up to 18 mines in place of depth charges

Ternopil (U209) was a Grisha-class anti-submarine corvette of the Ukrainian Navy. In March 2014, the ship was captured by Russian forces during the annexation of Crimea, and was sunk as a live fire target in 2023.

== History ==
Ternopil was the 1124ME Project ship (NATO reporting name: Grisha V class, of the Soviet classification: Albatros class Russian: Альбатрос).

The Russian type designation is Small Anti-Submarine Ship. The Grisha-class anti-submarine ship is designed to search for and destroy enemy submarines found in coastal areas. They were equipped with a variety of anti-submarine warfare weapons and an SA-N-4 surface-to-air missile launcher. All were fitted with retractable fin stabilizers.

The Grisha V-class ships were built between 1985 and 2002. They incorporated further modifications with a single 76 mm gun replacing the twin 57 mm guns. Thirty ships were built. About 28 ships remain in the Russian Navy. Two ships—Lutsk and Ternopil—were built in Ukraine. Lutsk was launched on 22 May 1993 and Ternopil entered service on 16 February 2006 with the Ukrainian Navy.

== Service ==
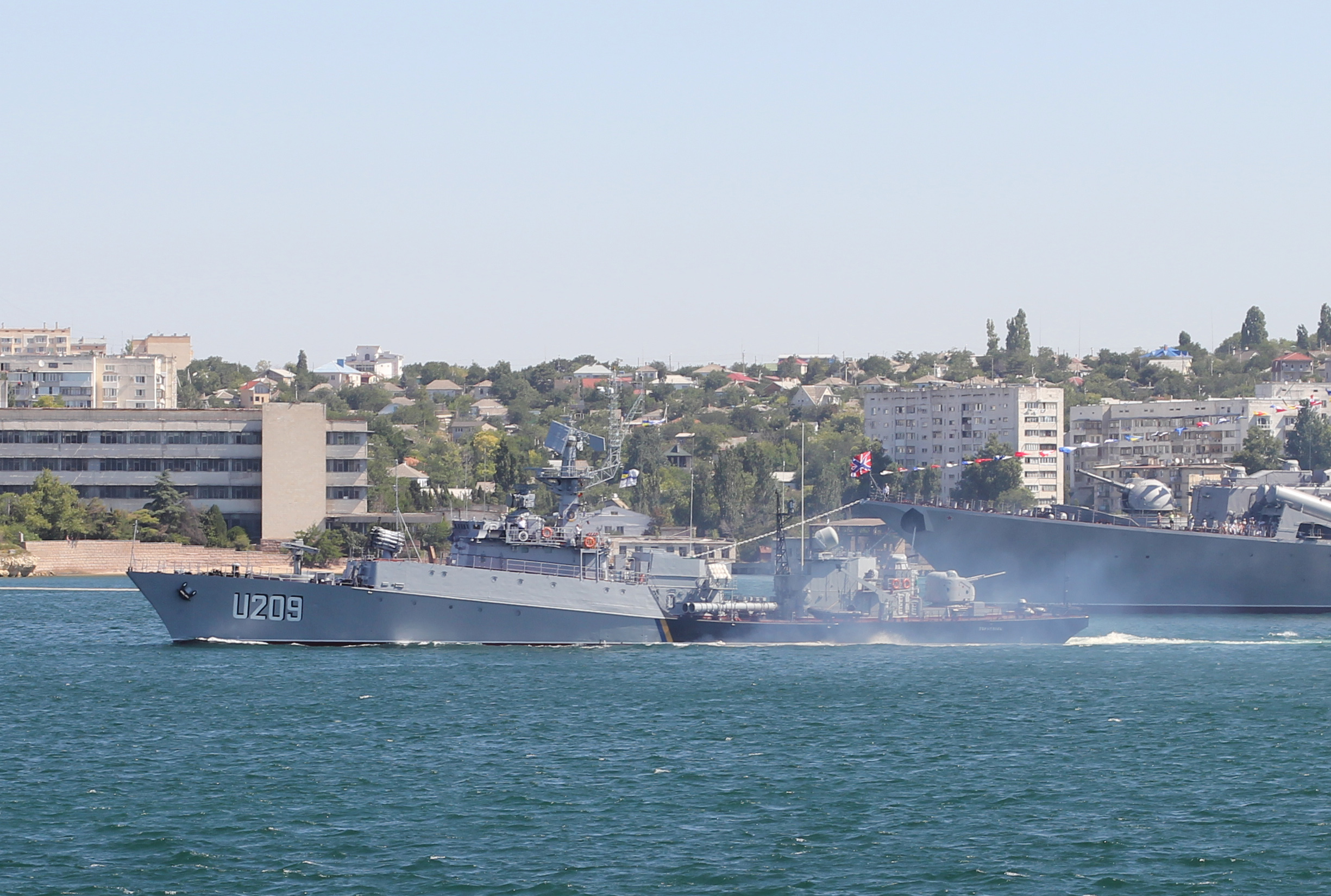
Ternopil in 2012

The corvette was laid down on 23 April 1991 at the Leninska Kuznya shipyard. The ship was launched on 15 March 2002. The corvette was moved 1,668 nmi (3,089 km; 1,920 mi) from Kyiv to Mykolaiv. The corvette was moved again to the port of Sevastopol for trials testing. On 15 February 2006, an act was signed adding the ship to the Ukrainian Navy; and the Ukrainian naval flag was raised on the ship on 16 February 2006.

The first deployment of the ship was in late 2006 for NATO Mission Oriented Training/MОТ. The Ukrainian crew practiced tactical episodes between 25 May and July 2007 while Ternopil took part in NATO's Operation Active Endeavour.

Ternopil participated in Operation Active Endeavour regularly in 2008, 2009 and 2010.

On 20 March 2014, the ship was captured by Russian forces during the annexation of Crimea by the Russian Federation. The ship was scheduled to be handed back to Ukraine in May 2014. As of 6 August 2014 it was not; Russia suspended the return of Ukrainian Navy assets from Crimea to Ukraine proper ostensibly because Ukraine did not renew its unilaterally declared ceasefire on 1 July 2014 in the War in Donbas. In 2016, it was reported that pieces from Ternopil were being used to repair Russia's Black Sea Fleet.

On 20 July 2023, Ternopil was sunk as a target during live fire exercises by the Black Sea Fleet. She was reportedly struck by an SS-N-22 missile fired by the Tarantul III missile boat Ivanovets.
