= Ukrainian corvette Kherson =

Grisha I-class corvette

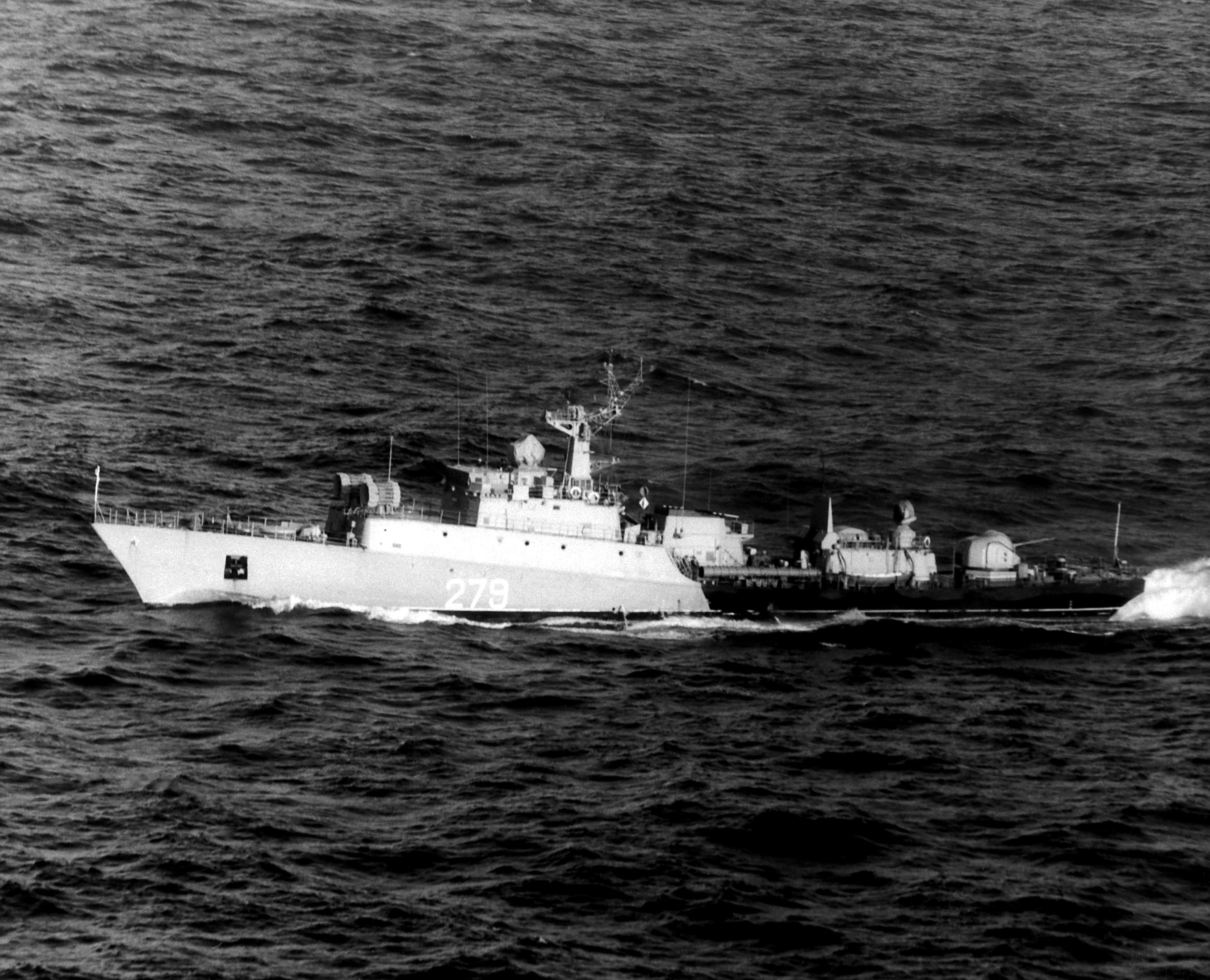
- MPK-52 in 1983

History

Soviet Union
- Name: MPK-52; (МПК-52)
- Builder: Kuznya na Rybalskomu, Kyiv
- Yard number: 100
- Laid down: 30 October 1968
- Launched: 30 May 1971
- Commissioned: 31 December 1971
- Identification: See Pennant numbers
- Fate: Transferred to Ukraine, 1997

Ukraine
- Name: Kherson; (Херсон)
- Namesake: Kherson
- Commissioned: 1 August 1997
- Decommissioned: 8 September 1999
- Identification: Pennant number: U210
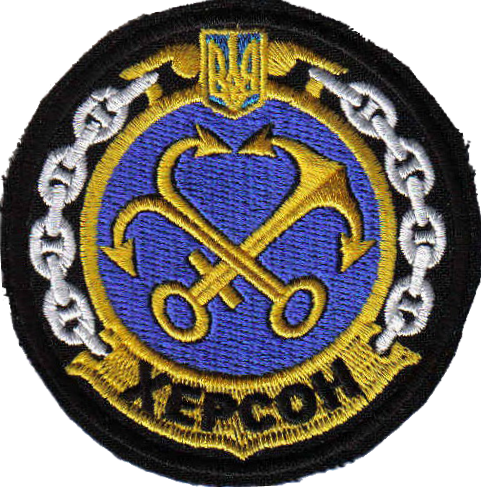
- Badge

General characteristics
- Class & type: Grisha I-class corvette
- Displacement: standard 830 tons, full load 990 tons
- Length: 71.2 m (233 ft 7 in)
- Beam: 10.1 m (33 ft 2 in)
- Draught: 3.8 m (12 ft 6 in)
- Propulsion: 3 shaft, 2 × М-507А cruise diesels, 28,000 kW (38,000 shp), (2 shafts); 1 × М-8М boost gas turbine 13,000 kW (18,000 shp), (1 shaft); Electric Plant: 1×DG-500 (500 kW), 1×DG-300 (300 kW), 1×DG-200 (200 kW)
- Speed: 35 knots (65 km/h; 40 mph)
- Range: 2,500 nautical miles (4,600 km; 2,900 mi) at 14 knots (26 km/h; 16 mph)
- Endurance: 9 days
- Complement: 79 (9 chiefs)
- Sensors & processing systems: Radar: MR-302 Rubka air/surface search radar; MR-1031 AK-725 fire control radar; Don-2 navigation radar; Sonar: MGK-322T Argun'/Bull Horn low-frequency hull-mounted sonar; MGK-339T Shelon'/Elk Tail medium-frequency through-hull dipping sonar
- Electronic warfare & decoys: Bizan-4B suite with Watch Dog intercept, 2 PK-16 decoy RL
- Armament: artillery: 2×2 57mm AK-725 gun mount (1000 rounds); antisubmarine: 2 twin 533 mm torpedo tubes DTA-5E-1124; 2 RBU-6000 A/S rocket launchers (96 rockets); 2 depth charge racks (12 depth charges); Up to 18 mines in place of depth charges

Kherson (U210) was a Grisha I-class anti-submarine corvette of the Ukrainian Navy. Prior to joining the Ukrainian Navy she was a former Soviet Navy corvette named MPK-52.

== Development and design ==
The 1124P project corvette (NATO reporting name: Grisha I class, Soviet classification: MPK-147 class Russian: МПК-147) were intended to counter enemy submarines in nearby area of naval bases, ports and scattered berths, on the deployment of naval forces to carry out anti-submarine surveillance and protection of ships and vessels at sea.

Project 1124 of the first series were armed with SAM Osa-M in the bow of the hull. One twin AK-725 gun was located in the stern. Control of firing AK-725 was carried out by the MR-103 Leopard radar with a maximum detection range of 40 km, which was also located on the stern superstructure. The MR-302 Rubka radar was installed as a radar for detecting air and surface targets on the ship's mast. The basis of the sonar consisted of submersible GAS MG-322 Argun (operated in echo direction-finding mode) and lowered GAS MG-339 Shelon in the stern superstructure, which operated only in the "stop" mode. The basis of anti-submarine weapons were located two twin torpedo tubes for DTA-5E-1124 and two RBU-6000 on the bow of the ship's superstructure.

Construction of small anti-submarine ships on Project 1124 began in 1967 at the Zelenodolsk Shipyard. A total of twelve ships of this project were built, after which they were replaced by the corvettes of Project 1124 of the second series (Grisha-III according to NATO reporting name).

== Construction and career ==
The corvette MPK-52 was laid down on 30 October 1968 at the Kuznya na Rybalskomu, Kyiv. The ship was launched on 30 May 1971. The corvette was commissioned on 31 December 1971.

MPK-52 was a member of the 400th division of anti-submarine ships of the 68th brigade of ships of the Black Sea Fleet, which took an active part in training and combat activities of the fleet. Navy of the USSR for anti-submarine training. On 13 March 1987, as a result of a three-day search of the CPUG (MPK-52, MPK-127 and MPK-93), the MPK-52 discovered an underwater target at a distance of 13 km (8.1 mi). As a result of almost a day of persecution, the Turkish submarine was forced to enter the territorial waters of Turkey and ascend.

During the division of the Black Sea Fleet of the USSR, the ship was intended to be handed over to the Ukrainian Navy, which was why it was stolen in a short period of time.

Despite the unsatisfactory technical condition, on 1 August 1997, the ship was handed over to the Ukrainian Navy. Few years later due to lack of funds for repairs, the corvette could not be put in service. On 8 September 1999, MPK-52 was expelled from the Ukrainian Navy and disposed of.

=== Pennant numbers ===
Date	Pennant number
1973	198
	190
	057
1992	068
