= Russian corvette Askold (2021) =

Russian Karakurt-class corvette

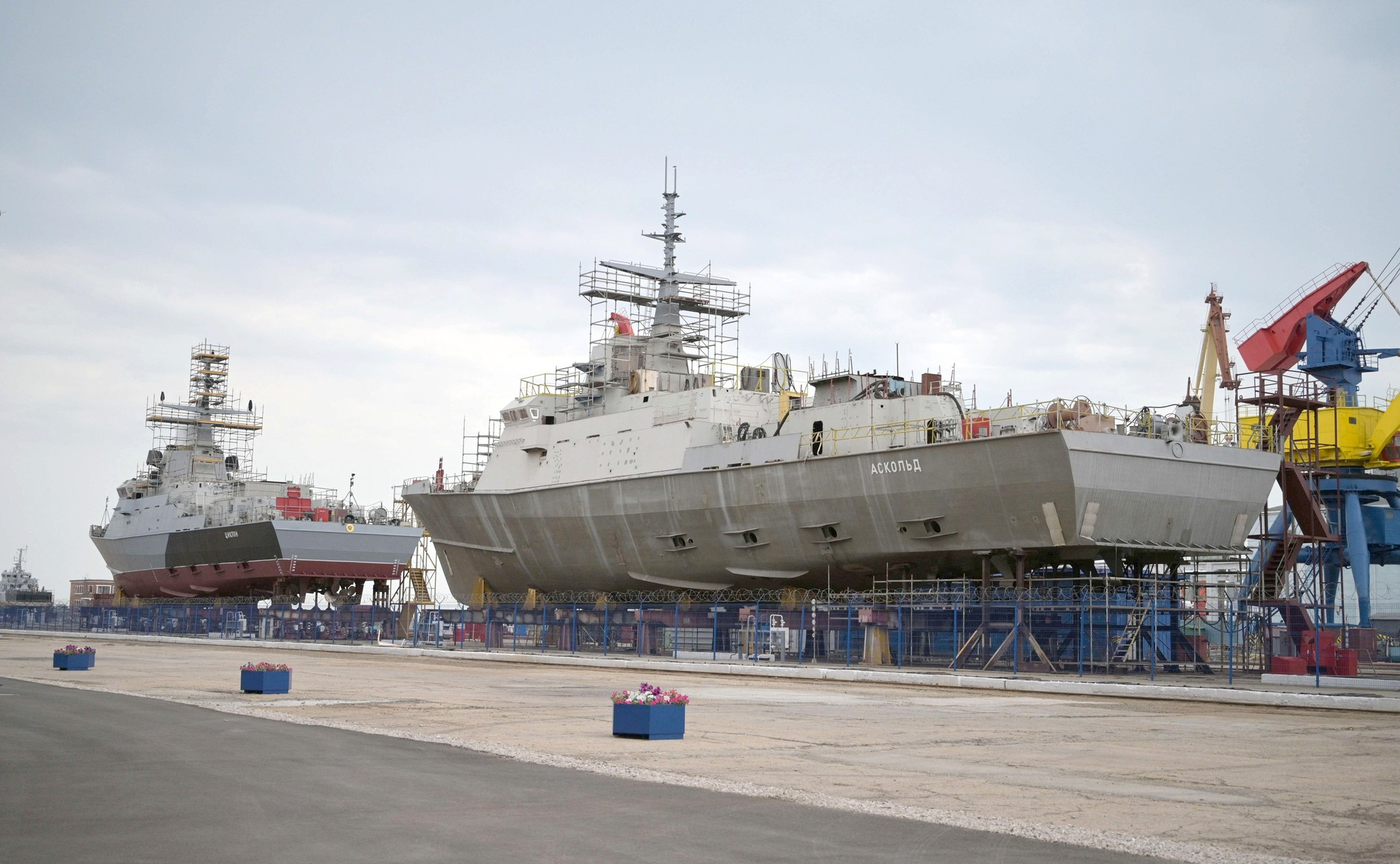
Askold in 2021.

Askold is a Russian Karakurt-class corvette launched in 2021. On 4 November 2023, the ship was reportedly damaged by a SCALP missile.
