= R-360 Neptune =

Ukrainian family of cruise missiles

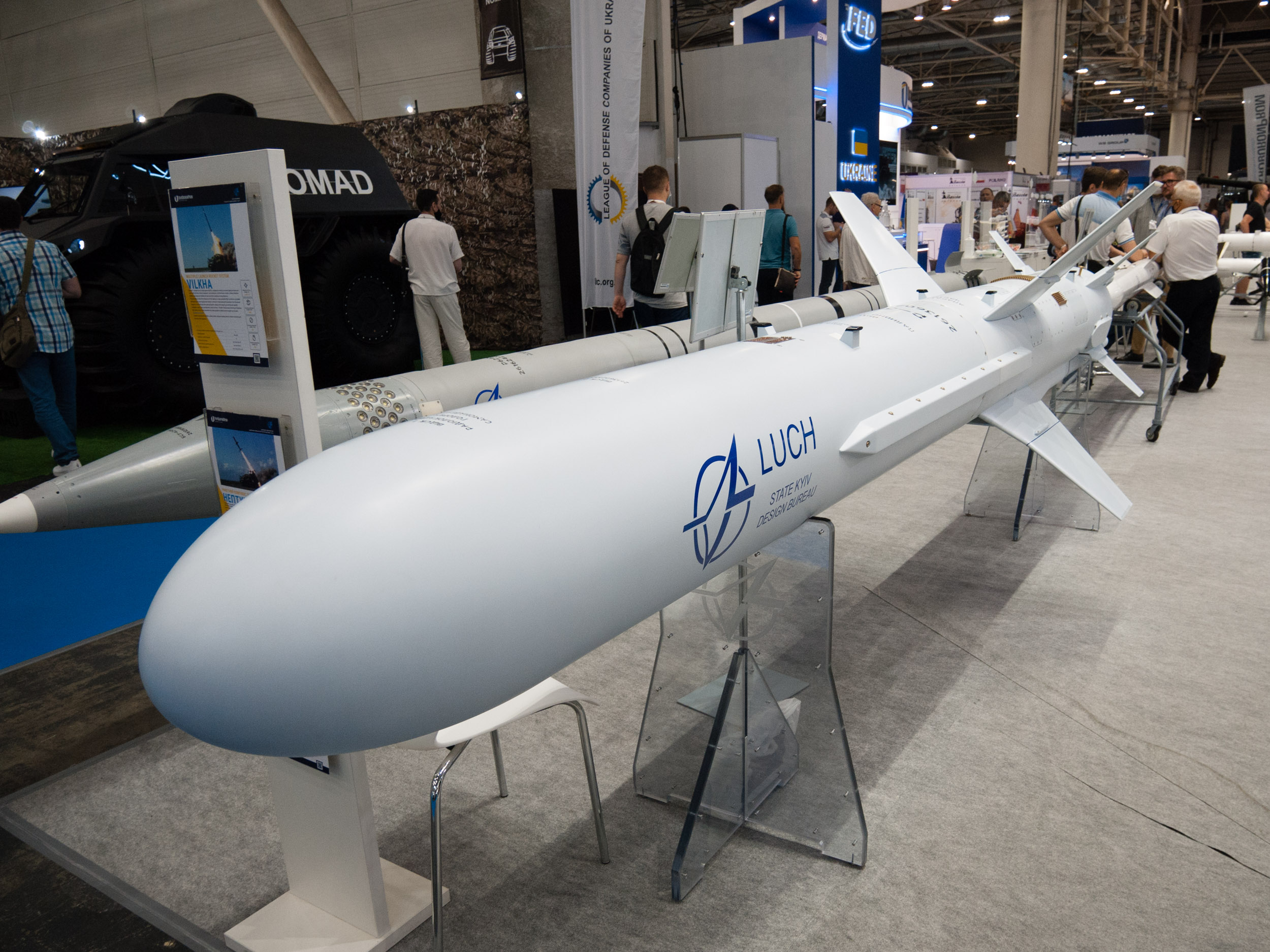
- R-360 Neptune at Arms and Security exhibition 2021
- Type: Anti-ship missile Cruise missile
- Place of origin: Ukraine

Service history
- In service: 2021–present
- Used by: Ukrainian Navy
- Wars: Russo-Ukrainian War

Production history
- Designer: Luch Design Bureau

Specifications
- Mass: 870 kg (1,920 lb)
- Length: 5.05 m (16.6 ft)
- Diameter: 38 cm (15 in)
- Warhead weight: Neptune 150 kg (330 lb); Long Neptune 260 kg (570 lb)
- Engine: Motor Sich MS400 turbofan
- Operational range: Over 280 km (170 mi) up to 1,000 km (620 mi) for Long Neptune
- Maximum speed: Subsonic

The R-360 Neptune (Ukrainian: Р-360 «Нептун», romanized: R-360 "Neptun") is a Ukrainian family of subsonic cruise missiles with all-weather capabilities developed by the Luch Design Bureau in Kyiv as an anti-ship missile, with a later variant for land attack. Neptune's design is based on the Soviet Kh-35 subsonic anti-ship missile, with substantially improved range, targeting and electronics equipment. It has a range of over 200 kilometres.

The system requirement was for a single missile to defeat surface warships and transport vessels with a displacement of up to 9,000 tonnes, either in convoys or moving individually. The first training missile divizion (battalion) entered service with the Ukrainian Navy in March 2021, with the first operational naval use in 2022. The land-attack variant has a new guidance system and was first fielded and used in 2023. "Long Neptune", an extended range land-attack variant with a claimed 1,000 km range, was first used in 2025, according to Ukrainian president Volodymyr Zelenskyy.

== Development ==
The missile was first revealed at the 2015 Arms and Security international exhibition in Kyiv.

According to information from open sources, the first flight examples of the cruise missile were manufactured in the second quarter of 2016. Production of advanced missile systems took place in cooperation with other Ukrainian companies, including Artem Luch, Motor Sich (MS400 turbofan engine), ZhMZ Vizar Kyiv, Radionix (seeker) and Arsenal SDP SE (navigation system).

The first tests of the system were conducted on 22 March 2016, attended by Secretary of the National Security and Defense Council (NSDC) Oleksandr Turchynov. In mid-2017, Neptune missiles were tested concurrently with Vilkha launchers and missiles. The test results and capabilities of the Neptune were not made public, unlike those of the Vilkha. According to the press service of the NSDC, the first successful flight tests of the system took place on 30 January 2018. On 17 August 2018, the missile successfully hit a target at a range of 100 kilometres (62 mi) during test firings in southern Odesa Oblast. On 6 April 2019, the missile was again successfully tested, hitting targets during tests near Odesa. According to President Petro Poroshenko, the Neptune system would be delivered to the Ukrainian military in December 2019.

After the withdrawal of the United States and Russia from the Intermediate-Range Nuclear Forces Treaty, Ukraine announced that it was considering developing intermediate-range cruise missiles. Ukraine signed a memorandum with Indonesia on concluding a contract for the supply of Neptune missiles, first reported in December 2020. Thus, Indonesia may become the first foreign buyer of Neptune, according to Defense Express with reference to the Ukrainian special exporter State Enterprise (SE) "Progress".

In March 2021, the Ukrainian Navy obtained the first training missile battalion of the RK-360MC Neptune.

On 18 November 2024, Ukraine claimed that serial production of Neptune missiles had been expanded and it had built 100 so far that year.

On 15 March 2025, President Zelenskyy claimed that the new Long Neptune missile can reach targets up to 1,000 km away, which is further than the 500 km range of the Taurus cruise missile.

== Operational history ==
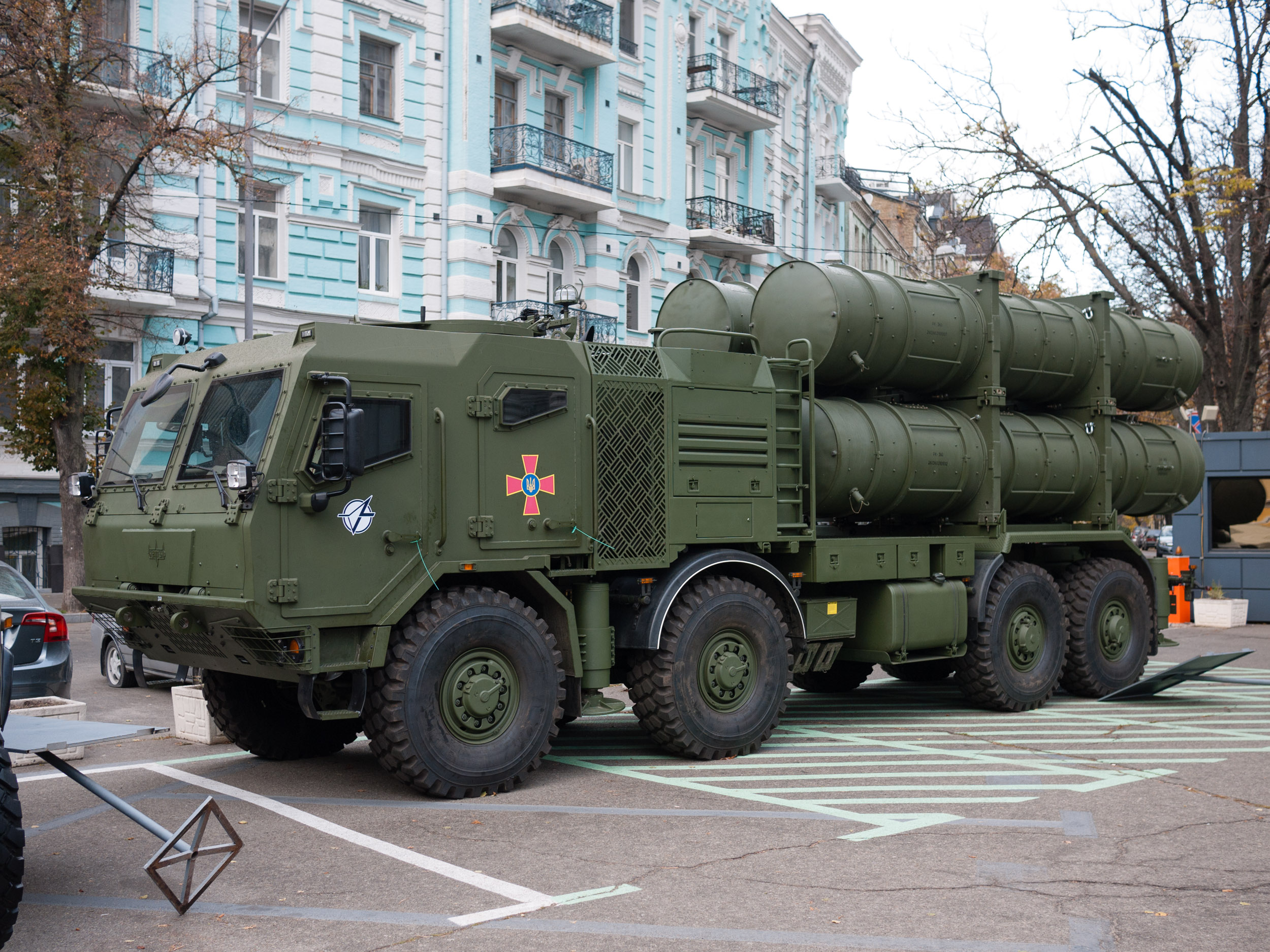
Transport-Erector-Launch vehicle with quad-pack of Neptune missiles

On 3 April 2022, during the Russian invasion of Ukraine, Ukrainian sources claimed that the Russian frigate Admiral Essen had been damaged by Ukrainian forces. Later, Oleksiy Arestovych, a freelance adviser to the Office of the President of Ukraine, clarified that Admiral Essen had been hit by a Neptune missile. The Russians did not comment on the claim and the ship continued its mission as normal.

On 13 April 2022, Ukrainian sources claimed the Russian cruiser Moskva was hit by two Neptune missiles, resulting in a fire and subsequent explosion of a shipboard ammunition store. The Russian Ministry of Defence stated, without discussing the cause, that a fire had caused munitions to explode and the crew had been fully evacuated. Russia reported the vessel as still being afloat later in the day of the fire, but Russian state media subsequently reported that she had sunk in inclement weather while being towed.

According to Thomas Shugart, a former U.S. Navy submarine commander, Slava-class cruisers like Moskva have been typically "known for their offensive punch, not for their defensive systems or their damage control". Moskva was one of the largest warships sunk in combat since World War II. The successful use of the Neptune system to sink the warship was cited by Ukrainian Defence Minister Oleksii Reznikov as giving confidence to Ukraine's allies that more weapon supplies to Ukraine would be worth it.

A land attack variant was being designed and, as of April 2023, was close to completion. The Neptune missile was initially designed to hit ships at sea. According to a Ukrainian official: "Ukraine is working to modify Neptune missile to strike land targets ... A new guiding/homing system is required, but Ukrainians are working on that ... Once we get that, the Neptunes can hit targets 360 km (about 225 miles) away. We are pretty close."

On 23 August 2023, according to Ukrainian media reports, a modified R-360 missile was used to destroy a S-400 missile system radar, deployed on Cape Tarkhankut in Crimea since 2016.

On 14 September, Ukrainian forces subsequently claimed to have destroyed S-400 missile systems near Yevpatoriya using drones and Neptune missiles. One day earlier, two Russian vessels in Sevastopol were heavily damaged by either Neptune or Storm Shadow cruise missiles.

On 26 March 2024, Ukraine claimed to have struck the landing ship Konstantin Olshansky with a Neptune missile. The vessel had been seized from Ukraine in 2014, when Russian forces took control of the Crimean peninsula.

On 9 April 2024, Russian forces claimed to have intercepted a Neptune missile near the Crimean coast.

On 21 April 2024, a video was released from Sukharnaya Bay, Sevastopol, that allegedly shows the salvage ship Kommuna hit by a Ukrainian Neptune missile. Kommuna took part in salvage efforts after Moskva was hit in 2022.

In April 2024, Ukraine was working on extending the range of the missile to 1,000 km (620 mi), while increasing production tenfold.

On 31 May 2024, Ukraine fired several Neptune missiles at an oil depot attached to Port Kavkaz, Krasnodar Krai. Russian officials claimed to have shot down the missiles. Ukrainian officials and Russian opposition reported a fire and damage to three petroleum tanks.

The new land attack variant is called Neptune-MD by Russian forces. Ukrainians call it the Long Neptune. On 21 June 2024, a Neptune struck a Shahed drone depot and training facility in Krasnodar.

On 31 July 2024, a Neptune struck an airbase in Kursk, Russia, one hundred kilometres from the border with Ukraine, hitting "a warehouse for storing weapons and military equipment", according to Ukrainian officials. Russia claimed to have shot down the missile.

On 2 August 2024, Romania and Ukraine announced a plan to manufacture and improve the Neptune missile.

On the morning of 21 August 2024, the Ukrainian military claimed to have struck a Russian S-300 air defense system in Rostov Oblast overnight, possibly by using a Neptune missile.

On 10 January 2025, the Ukrainian military claimed to have hit a military warehouse in the Rostov region by a long range Neptune missile.

Images of the Long Neptune were released. Roughly one and a half metres longer than the R-360 version, the fuselage of the missile has been expanded from 38 cm to about 50 cm. Enlarged as well are the wing and tail surfaces. The warhead appears the same as the original R-360 version.

On 28 August 2025, a Neptune missile battery tried to attack targets in Krasnodar Krai, from a location in Ukraine. Four S-300 missiles intercepted the Neptune missiles. A drone then gave the launcher’s location to a Russian Iskander ballistic missile team, that then managed to either damage or destroy the Neptune missile launcher.

On 29 September 2025, four Neptune missiles struck the Karachev electrical components plant. The plant manufactured electrical components for the Russian military.

During 2024 over 50 plus attacks were carried out by the Ukrainian Navy using Neptune missiles.

On 31 October 2025, Neptune missiles struck the Oryol thermal power plant resulting in a power outage. Neptune missiles also struck the Novobryansk substation, near Bryansk.

On 19 April 2026, the Atlant-Aero drone factory, in Taganrog, was destroyed by Neptune missiles.

On 31 May 2026, the Ukrainian Navy fired Neptune missiles at Novoshakhtinsk refinery striking “two crude distillation units, AVT-1 and AVT-2, followed by a fire on the facility's premises.”

On 11 June 2026, Ukrainian Navy Neptune missiles struck a Black Sea Fleet ammunition dump located at Strilets'ka bay.

On 16 August 2026, Neptune missiles were fired at the Kamensky Combine, in Rostov Oblast. A plant that manufactured both solid rocket fuel and explosives. The solid rocket fuel was used in Uragan, Smerch and Tornado-S MLRS systems. Two workshops were reported destroyed and four damaged, according to Ukrainian officials.

On 9 September 2026, the Russian frigate Admiral Essen was struck by a Neptune missile, while in port at Novorossiysk naval base, starting a fire on the ship’s superstructure. A Project 11711 and minesweeper Zheleznyakov. A Buyan-class corvette was also attacked, both it and the Admiral Essen were capable of launching Kalibr cruise missiles.

On 15 September 2026, the Atlant Aero drone factory in Taganrog was struck by Neptune missiles, resulting in damage that collapsed a section of roof some 70 × 40 meters.

On 26 September 2026, the Ukrainian Navy and Alpha Special Operations Center struck the Azov Optical-Mechanical Plant in the Rostov region using Neptune missiles, plus Ruta, Palianytsia, and Bars missile drones. The plant manufacturers electronics for “precision artillery, missile, and anti-tank weapons, as well as radar seekers for tactical guided missiles, thermal imaging equipment, and optoelectronic systems”.

On 15 October 2026, Borisoglebsk air base was attacked by Neptune missiles, some six Su-34s were claimed to be destroyed along with support equipment, satellite imagery confirmes two, and suggests perhaps another two.

On 30 October 2026, a Neptune missile strike destroyed two Su-34s at the Marinovka Air Base.

On 31 October 2026, a chemical company in Kamensk-Shakhtinsky was attacked by Ukrainian drones and Neptune missiles, damaging four production and starting a fire at the finished goods warehouse. The Ukrainian General Staff claimed the company made solid rocket propellant used for Russian MLRS systems.

On 7 November 2026, Ukrainian Neptune Missiles attacked the 'Proton' industrial cluster in Oryol. The plant builds components for various Russian missile systems, including Iskander-M, S-71 'Kover' cruise missiles, and Pantsir-S1 systems. the General Staff of the Armed Forces of Ukraine wrote on Facebook:"...A direct hit on the target was recorded. A fire broke out on the facility's premises, and explosions were heard,"

On 13 November 2026, Ukrainian Neptune missiles struck targets three targets in Rostov, striking a production facility, maintenance facility and storage area for drones.

On 17 November 2026, Ukrainian Neptune missiles were used to strike the Crimean Bridge. The Neptine was used alongside other weapons such as the FP-5 Flamingo and Ruta missile. The result was a “span (of the bridge) more than 270 meters long fell into the water”. While the road section of the bridge was destroyed, the attack failed to destroy the rail section of the bridge.

On 19 November 2026, an unspecified number of Neptune missiles were fired at the Crimean Bridge to “finish off” the still operational rail section that remained, the third attack in four days. However the damage was “limited to only one of the two sets of tracks on the bridge”.

== Design ==
The Neptune uses a solid-fuel booster rocket to launch it into the air. After the fuel is expended the rocket stage falls away and the jet engine takes over, providing the necessary thrust. A Neptune missile, including rocket motor, is 5.05 metres (16 ft 7 in) in length, with a cross-shaped hard wing. They are designed to be housed in transport and launch containers with dimensions 5.3 by 0.6 by 0.6 metres (209 in × 24 in × 24 in). The system has a maximum range of about 300 kilometres (190 mi). A single missile weighs 870 kilograms (1,920 lb), of which 150 kilograms (330 lb) is the warhead. It uses a Motor Sich MS400 engine which has a high thrust-to-weight ratio.

When deployed, a Neptune coastal defence system comprises a truck-based USPU-360 mobile launcher, four missiles, a TZM-360 transport/reload vehicle, a RCP-360 command and control vehicle, and a special cargo vehicle. Czech Tatra T815-7 trucks replaced prototype KrAZ vehicles. The system is designed to operate inland up to 25 kilometres (16 mi) from the coastline.

== Variants ==
=== R-360 Neptun ===
Anti-ship variant, capable of ground attack as well, carrying a 150-kilogram warhead. Range is said to be 280 kilometres.

=== R-360L "Long Neptune" ===
Extended range "Long Neptune" land-attack variant, allegedly capable of flying up to 1,000 kilometers and armed with a 260-kilogram warhead. Capable of striking land and sea targets, operating without satellite navigation and "terrain-following flight". First used in 2025, according to Ukrainian president Volodymyr Zelenskyy.

=== Unknown variant ===
On 7 October 2025, a new version of the Neptune was revealed. It is believed to be a version in between the range of 280 kilometres for the original R-360 anti-ship missile and the 1,000 kilometres range for the Long Neptune. Notable features include side bulges from the fuselage, believed to be fuel tanks.

=== Neptune 2 ===
On 16 June 2026, Luch Design Bureau and MBDA signed a memorandum of understanding to develop the Neptune 2. No technical specifications were released but MBDA said the move would "implement revolutionary innovations to advance the deep-strike capabilities of Neptune 2 while strengthening strategic defense cooperation with Ukraine." Possible developments could include the introduction of low observable technology, improved navigation and improved warhead capabilities given MBDA developed both the BROACH and MEPHISTO warheads.

== Gallery ==
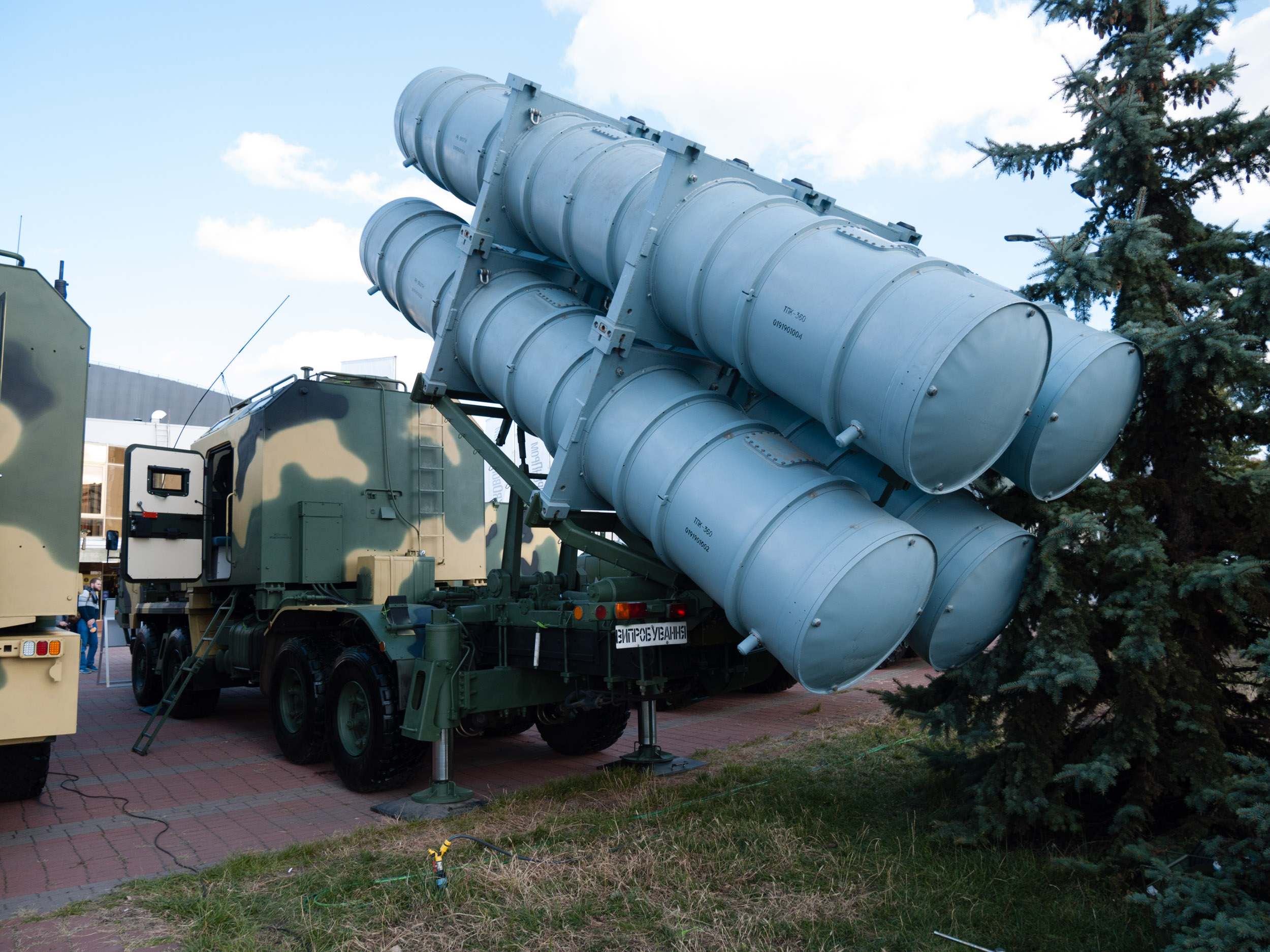
Launch vehicle

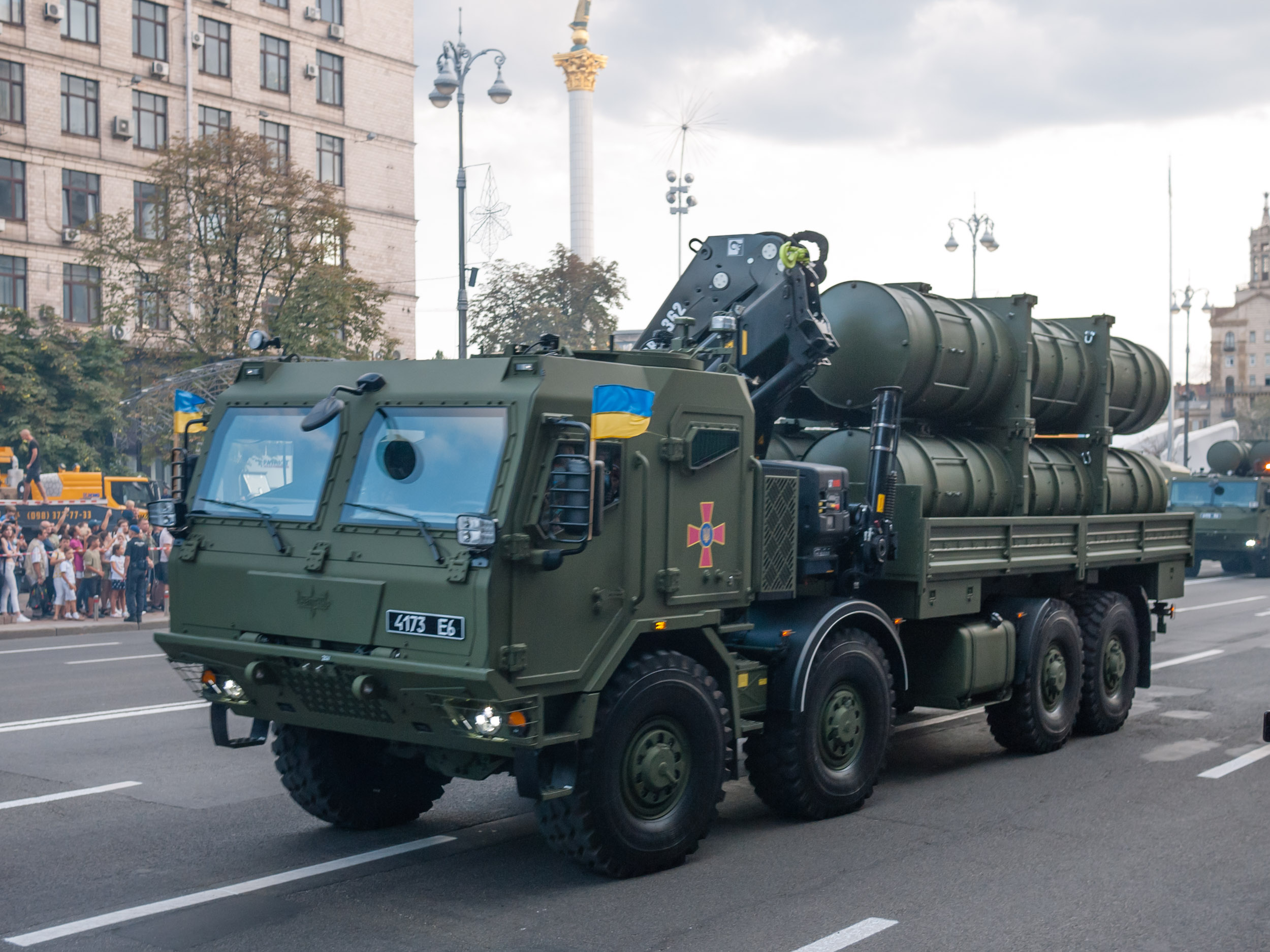
Reload transporter with crane

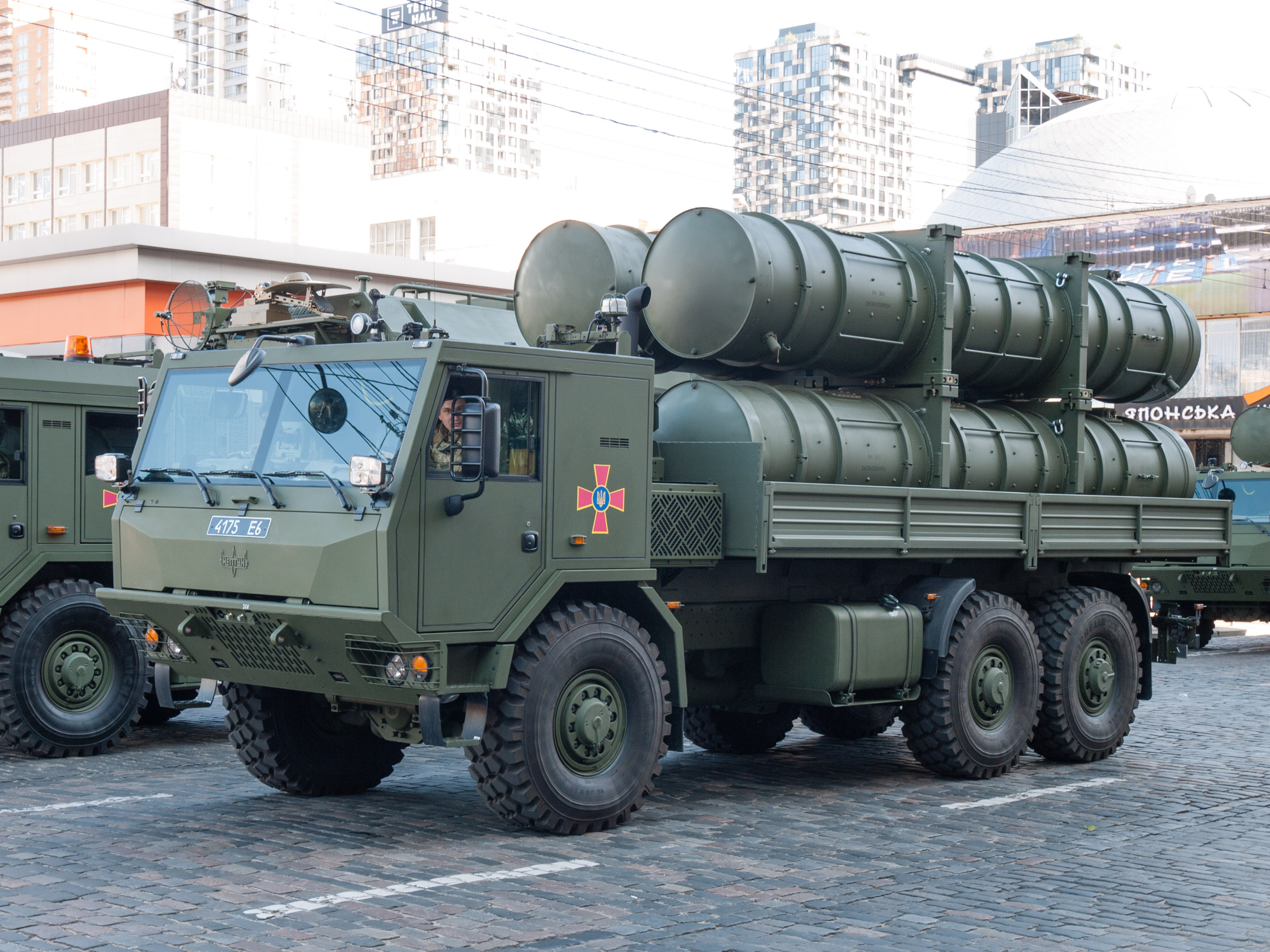
Transport without crane

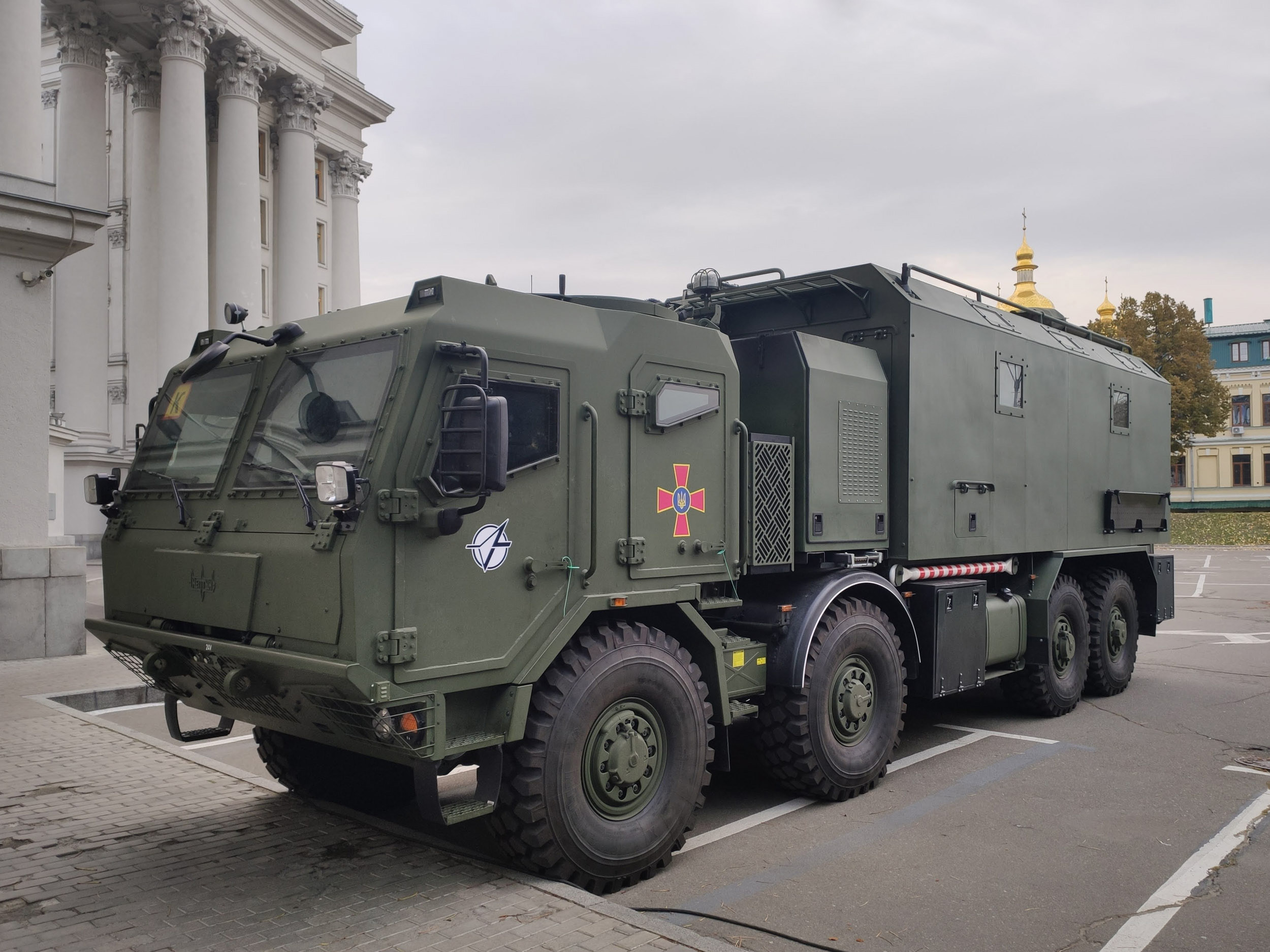
Command vehicle

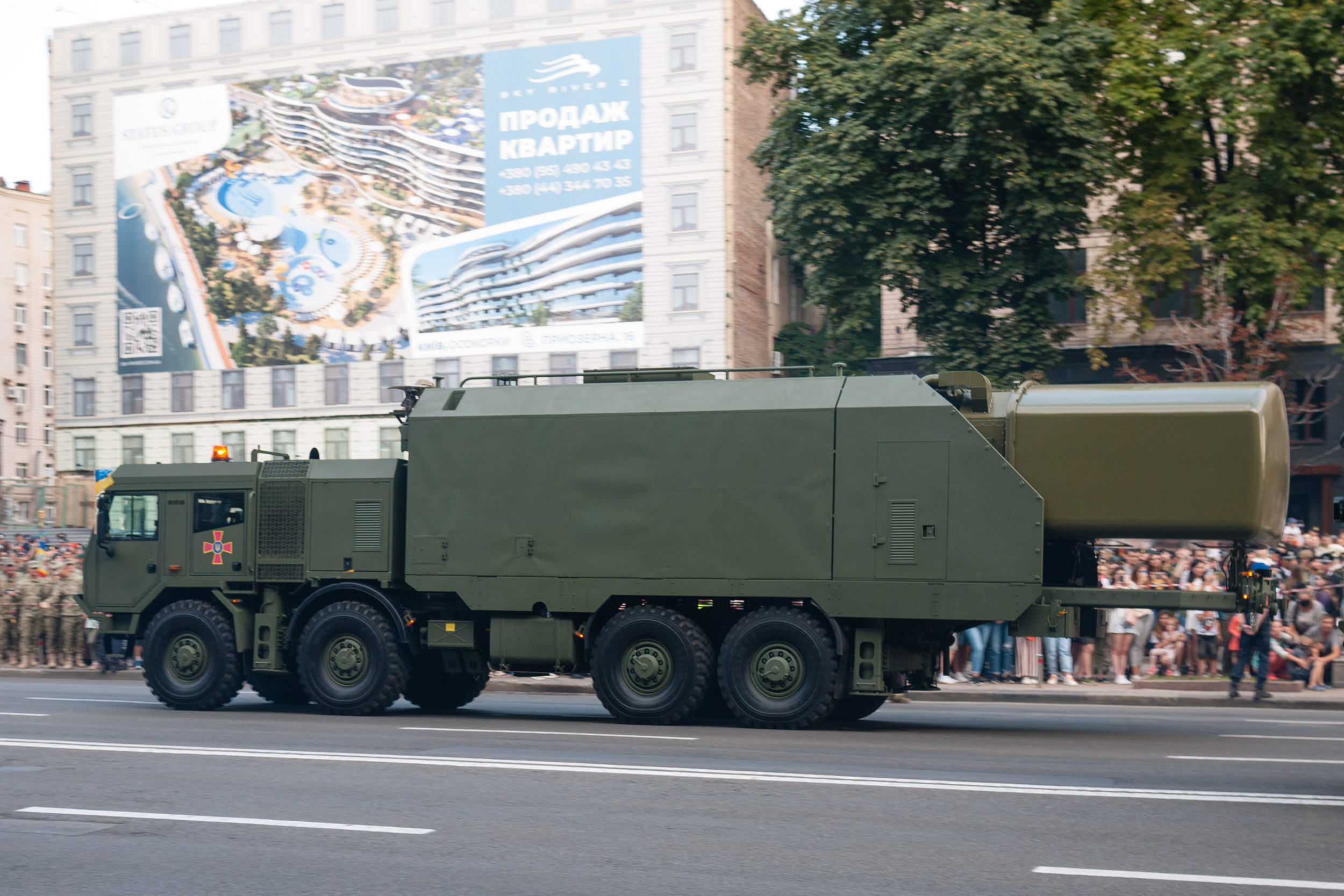
Mineral-U radar

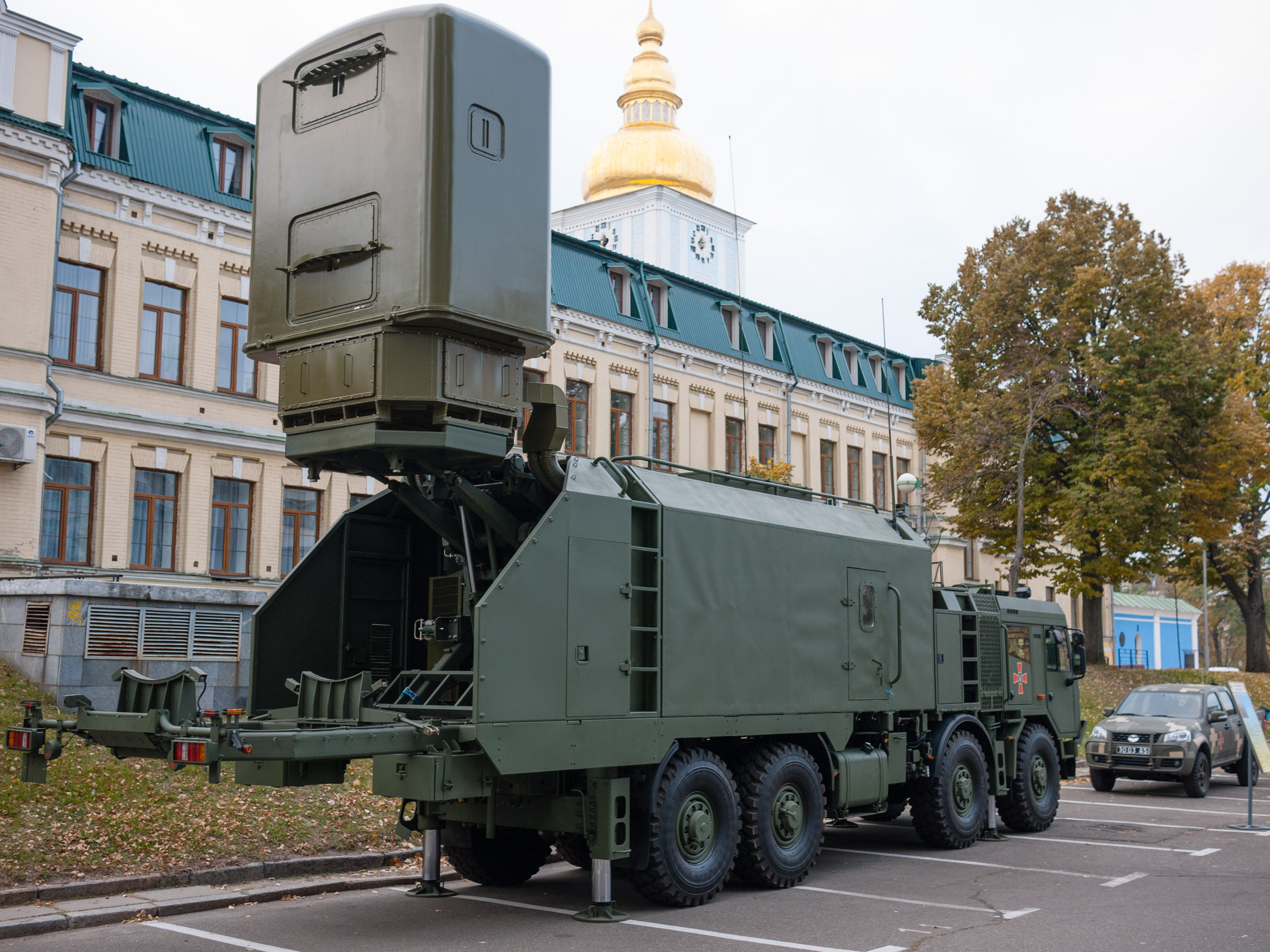
with radar erected

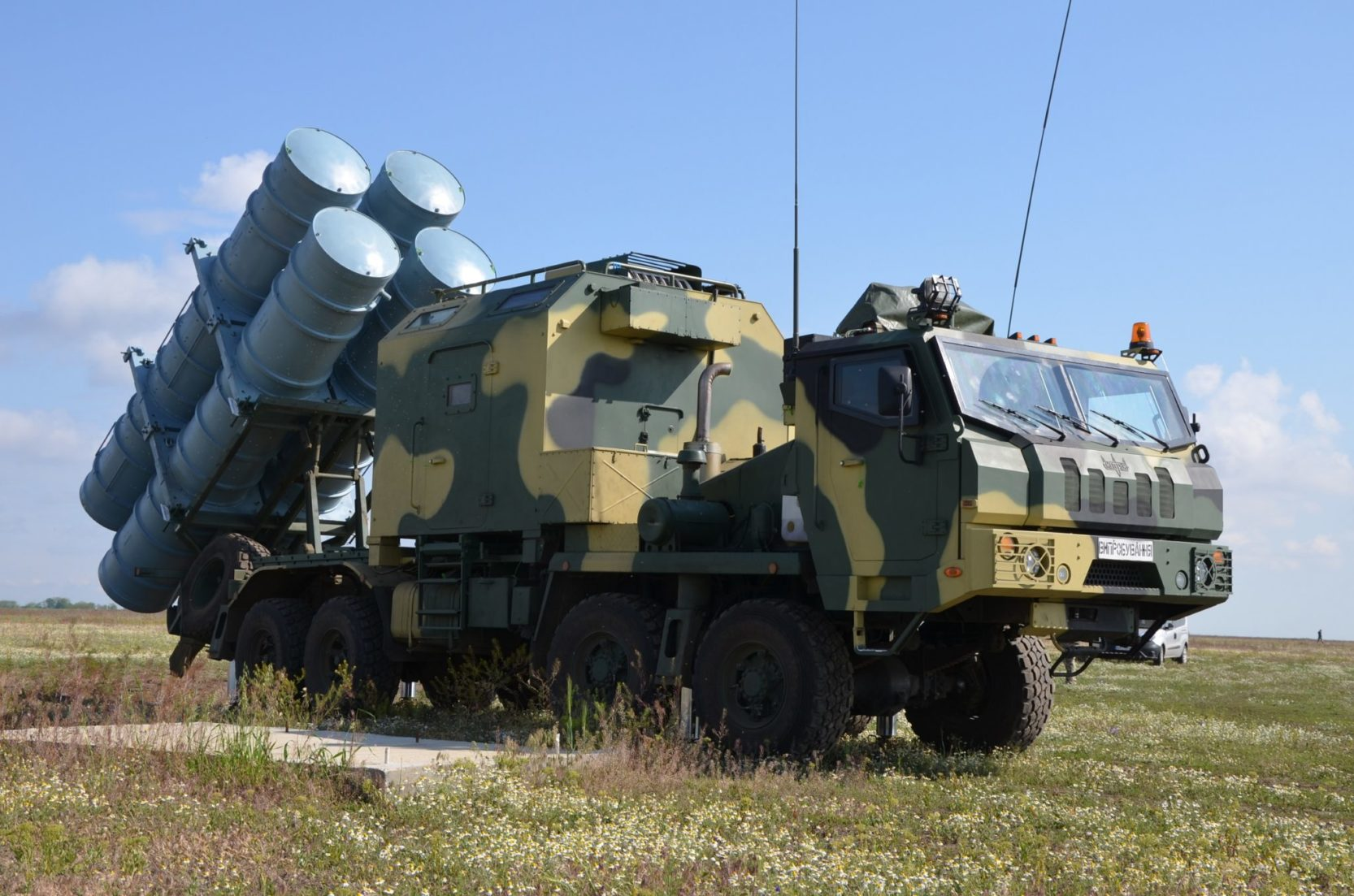
Prototype KrAZ-7634-based launch vehicle

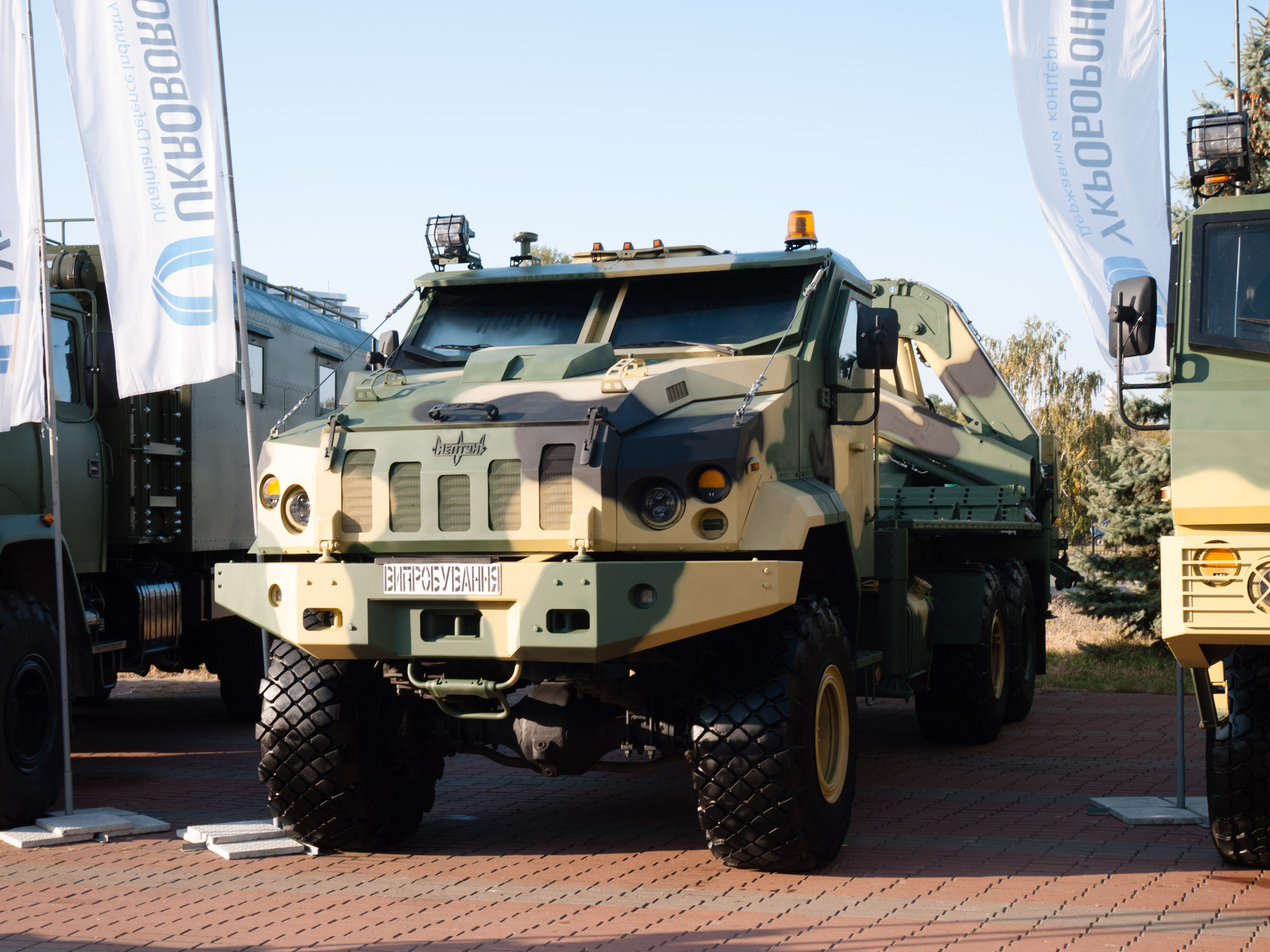
Prototype KrAZ-6322-based loader vehicle

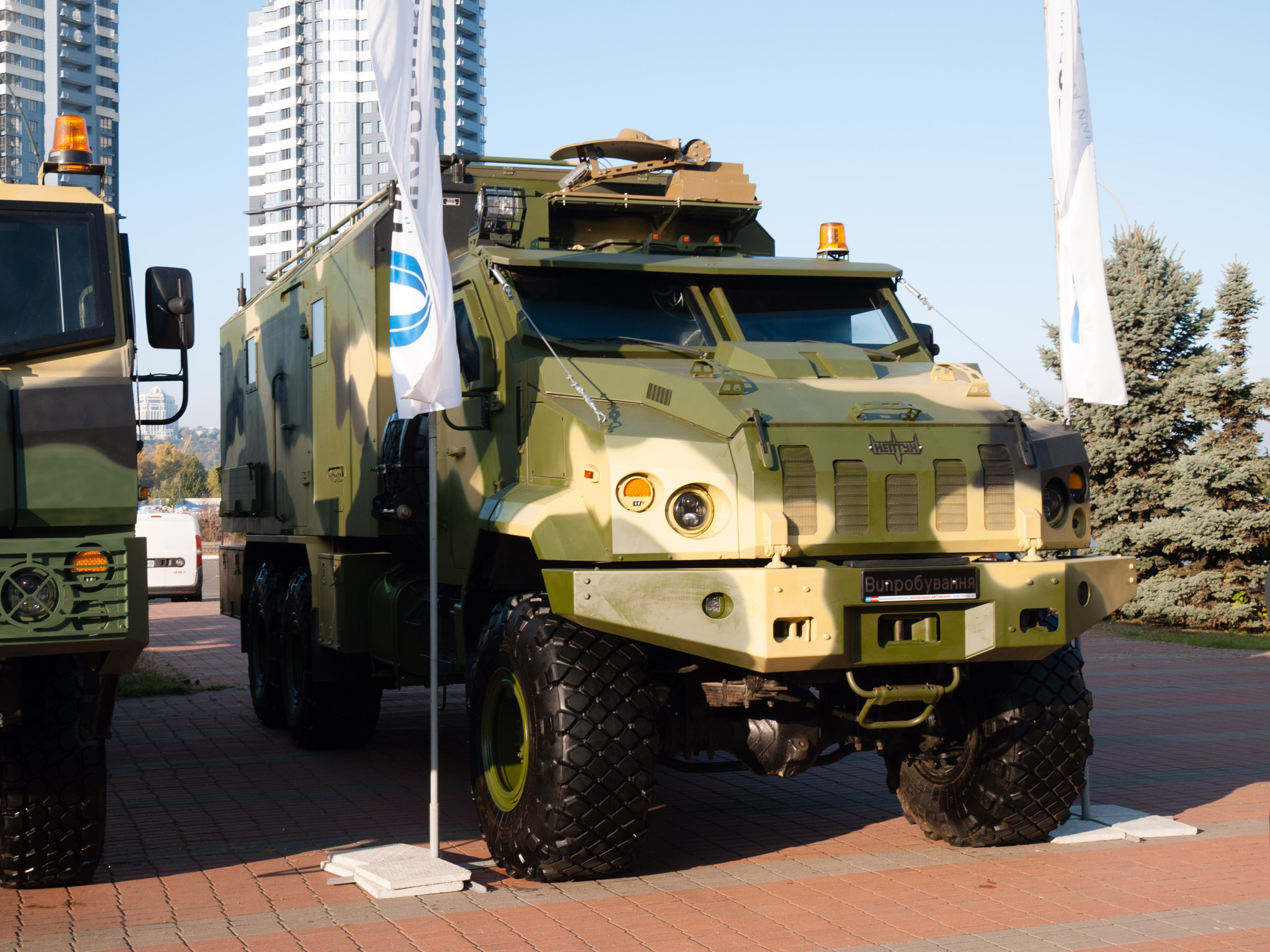
Prototype command vehicle

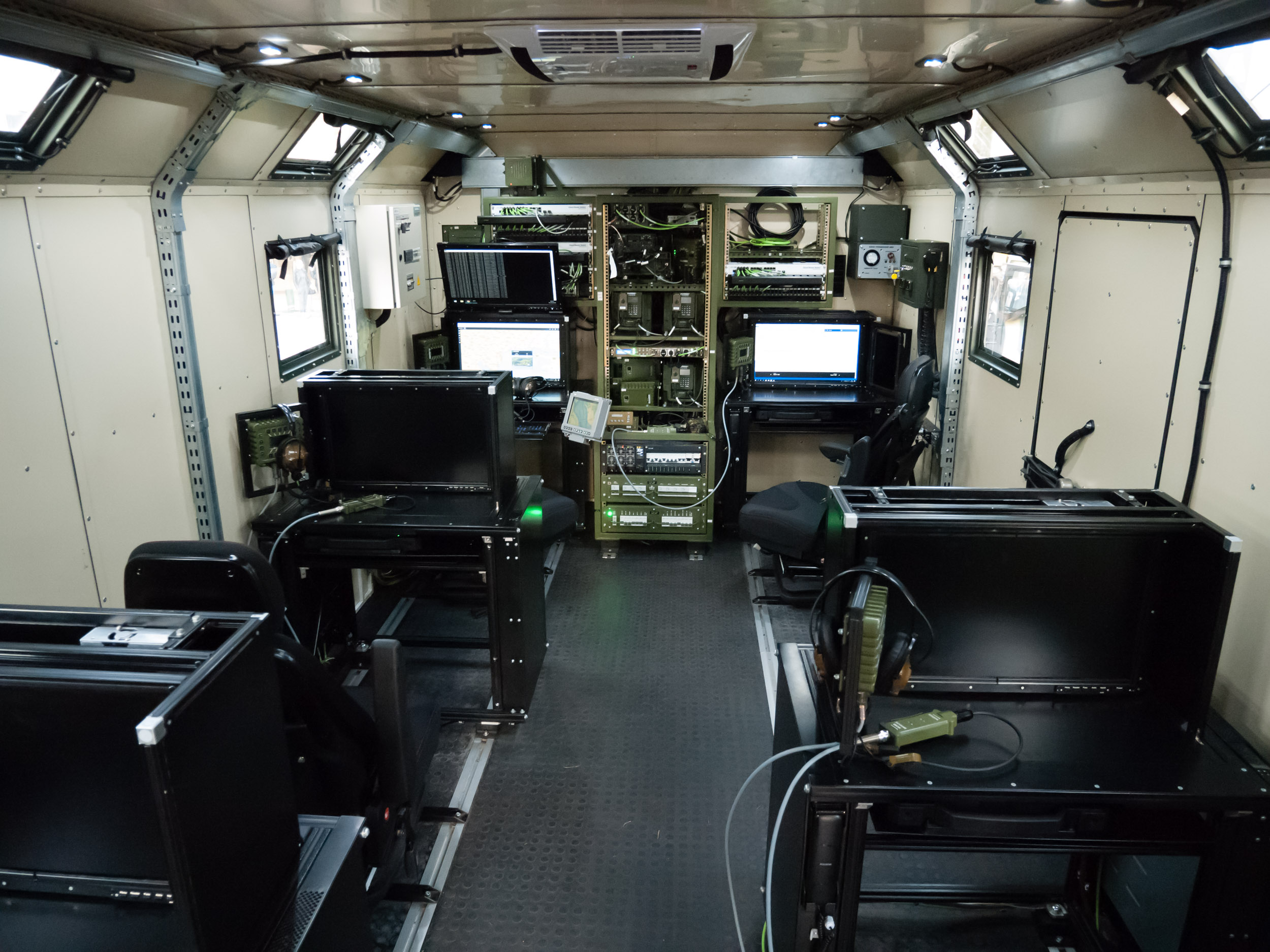
Prototype command vehicle interior

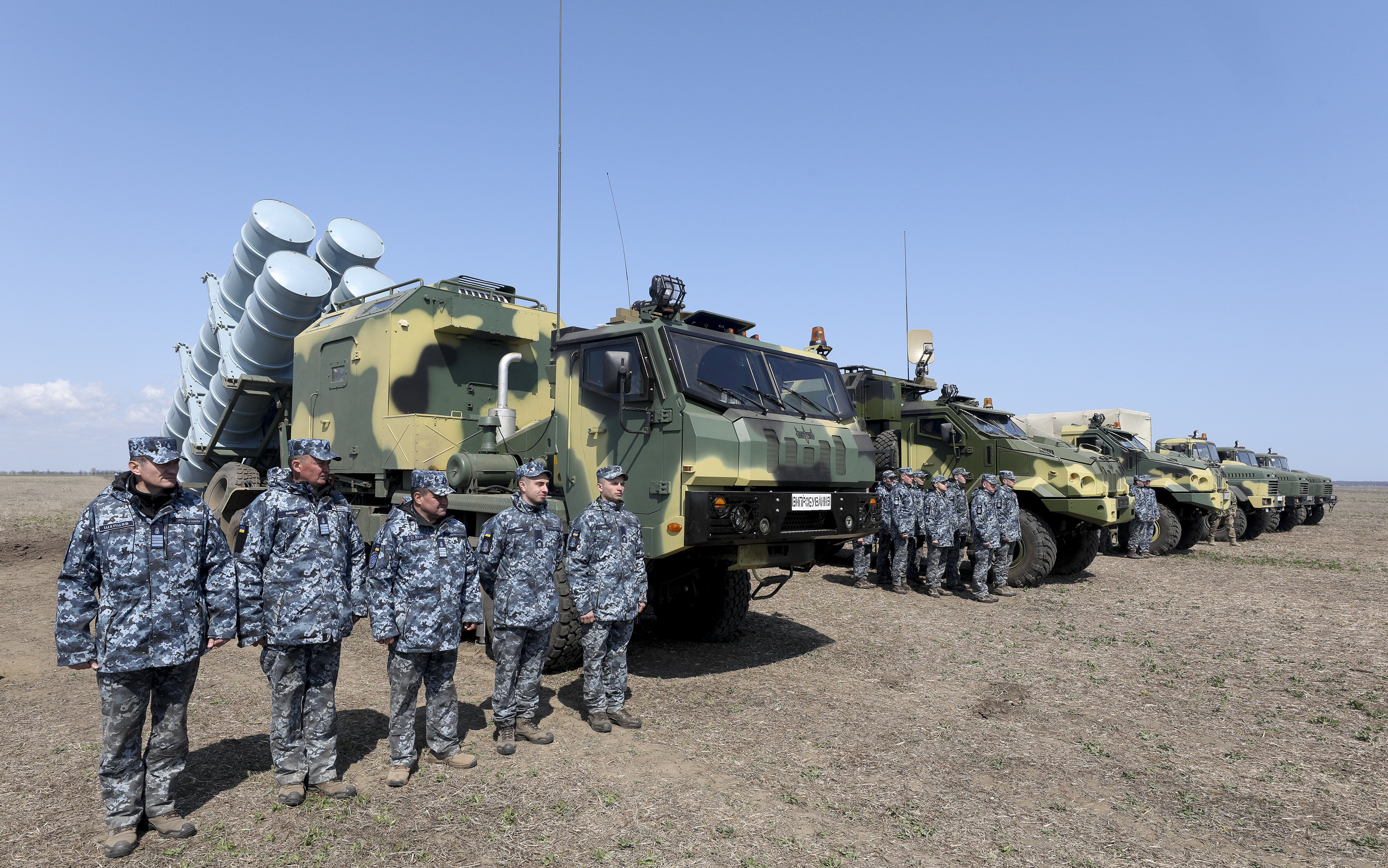
Prototype launcher with supporting vehicles

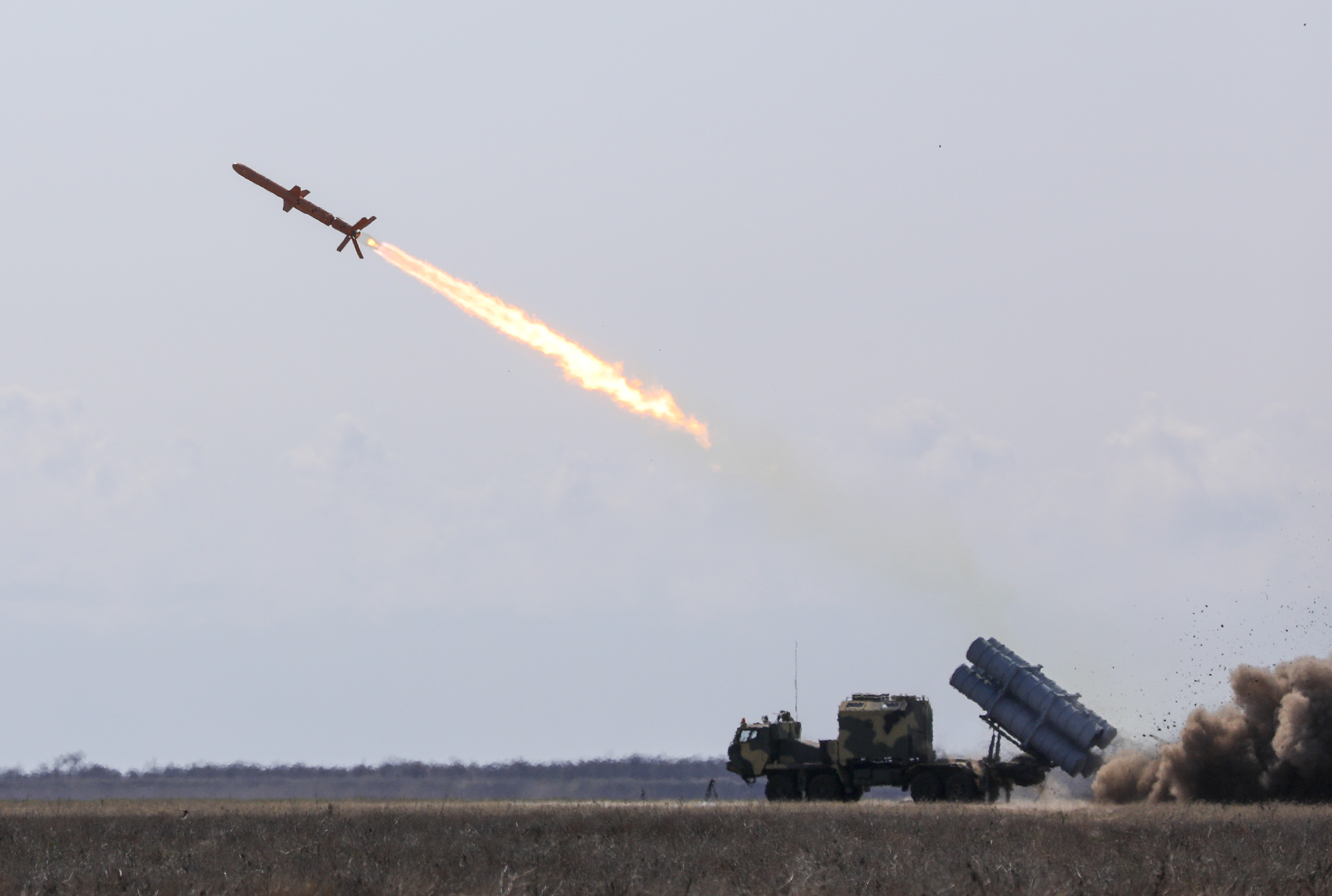
Test launch, 2019

== See also ==
Other subsonic anti-ship missiles

- Atmaca (Turkey)
- Blue Spear (Israel – Singapore)
- Exocet (France)
- Gabriel (Israel)
- Harbah (Pakistan)
- Harpoon (United States)
- Hsiung Feng II (Taiwan)
- NASM-MR (India)
- Naval Strike Missile (Norway)
- Otomat (Italy - France)
- RBS 15 (Sweden)
- SSM-700K C-Star (Republic of Korea)
- VCM-01 (Vietnam)
- YJ-83 (China)
- Zarb (Pakistan)
