= North Crimean Plain =

Geographic region

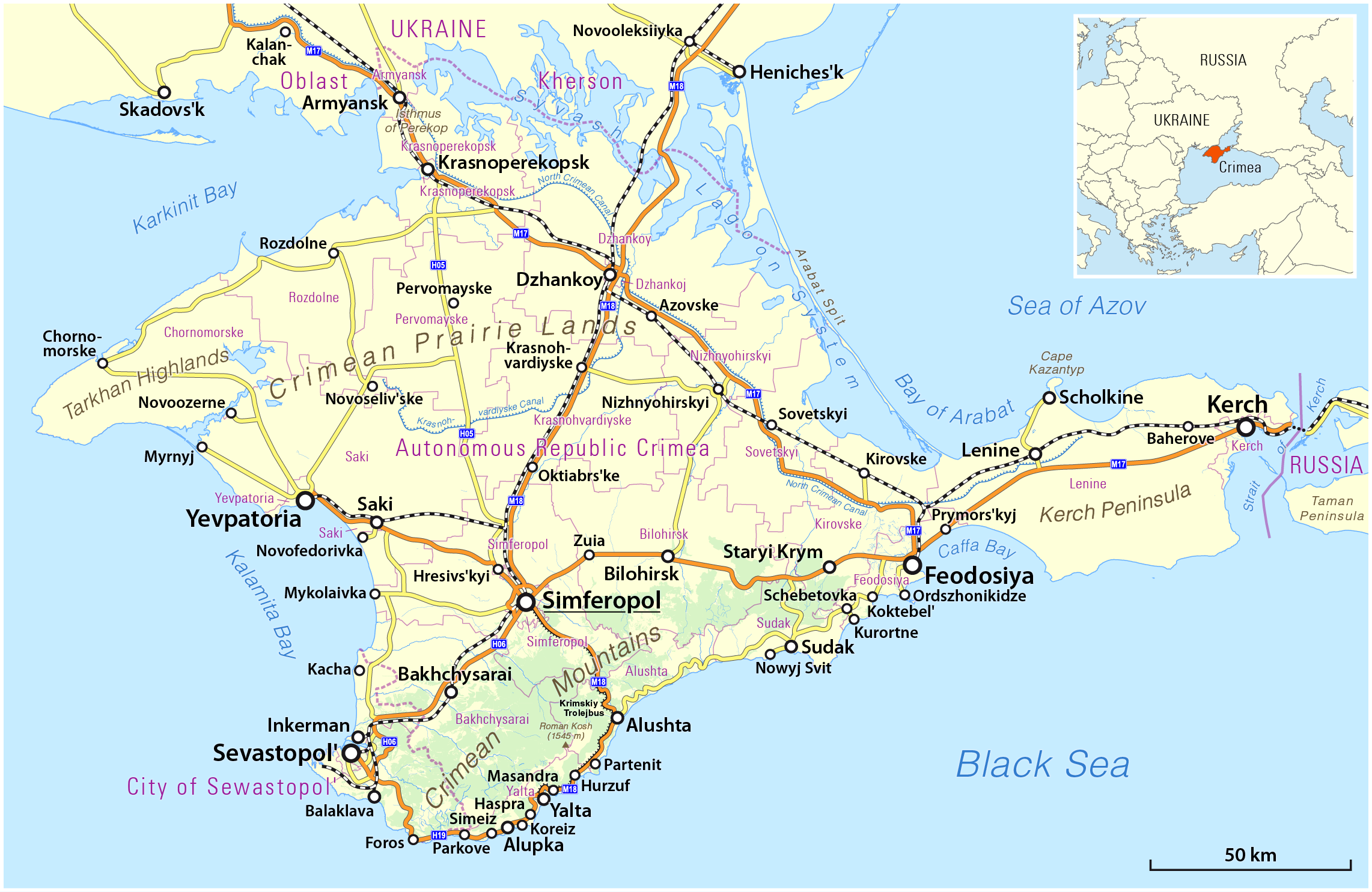
Geography map of Crimea with North Crimean Plain marked in yellow

Crimean Lowland, also known as North Crimean Plain (Ukrainian: Північнокримська рівнина, romanized: Pivnichnokrymska rivnyna is a geographic region located in the northern part of Crimea. It lies between the Perekop Isthmus in the north and the foothills of Crimean Mountains in the south, covering the major part of the peninsula.

== Geology ==
Geologically, the plain constitutes part of the Black Sea Lowland. It base is formed by Upper Cretaceous and Paleogene sediments, superseded by Neogene and Quaternary layers on the surface. The plain rises from the lowlands of Syvash in the northeast towards Tarkhankut Highlands in the southwest; the latter reaches the heights of 178 meters above sea level, ending in a steep shoreline rising 30-40 meters over the sea.

The far eastern part of the plain in Kerch Peninsula presents a hilly region with elevations up to 190 meters above sea level, whose ridges are dissected by valleys and depressions. It is built of limestone and soft clay soils of the Tertiary period. It contains a number of lakes, large areas of solonetz soils and numerous mud volcanoes in coastal regions.

== Climate and nature ==
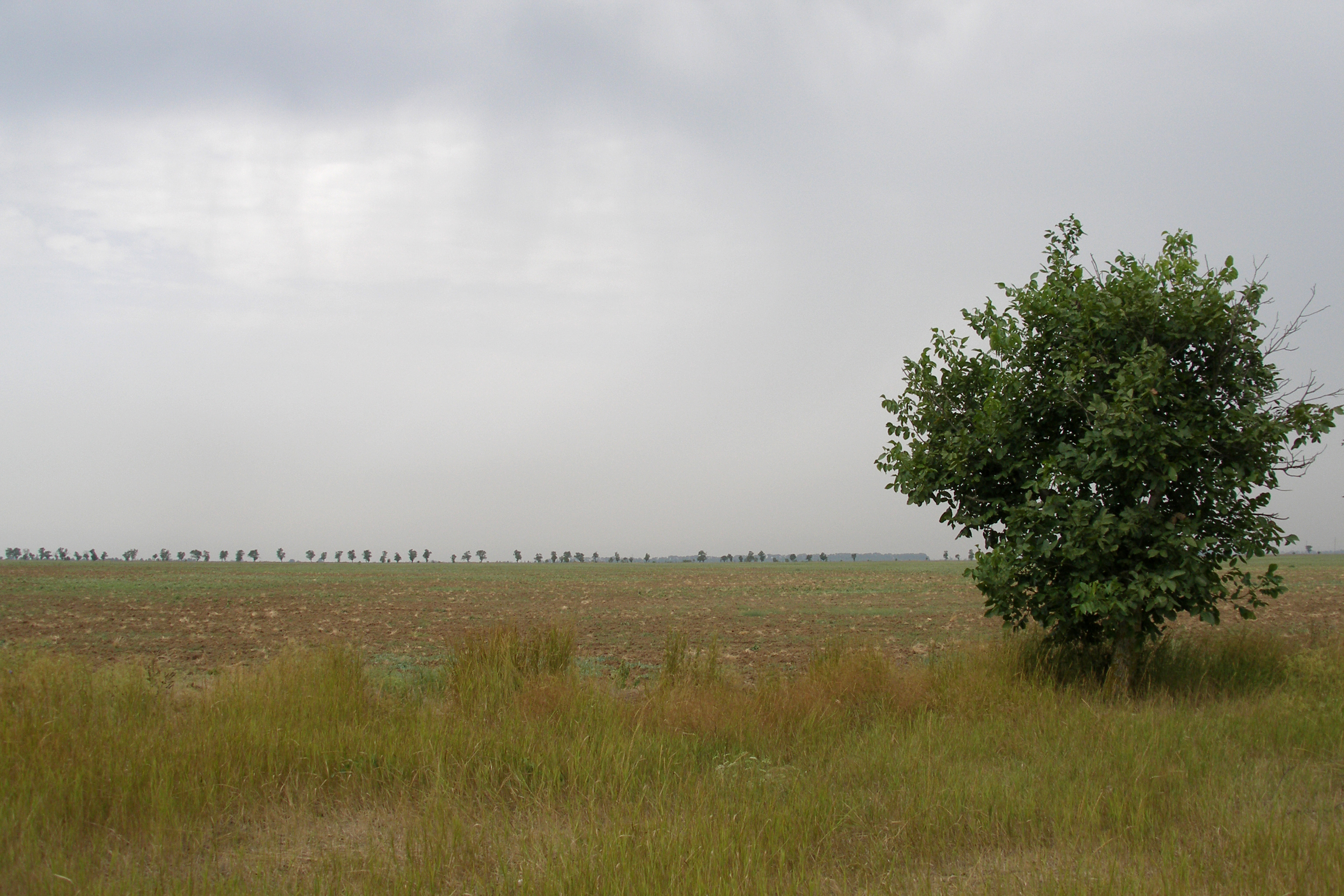
A typical Crimean steppe landscape

Crimean Lowland is dominated by a Steppe climate with mild winters, characterised by strong winds but little snowfall, and hot summers. Most of the precipitation comes during the summer period, with rainfall increasing towards the south. Local rivers are small and frequently dry up in summer; the longest one is Salhyr (232 km). No rivers are present on Tarkhankut and Kerch peninsulas, and irrigation is provided mostly by artesian wells. The driest part of the plain in the northeast is covered by salt marshes; in the northern areas fescue and feather grass steppes are predominant. The most humid southern areas contain low-humus chernozem soils and are likewise covered with steppe plants. Most of the steppe area is cultivated or used as pasture ground.
