= Black Sea Lowland =

Part of the East European Plain near the Black Sea

Coordinates: 47°N 33°E

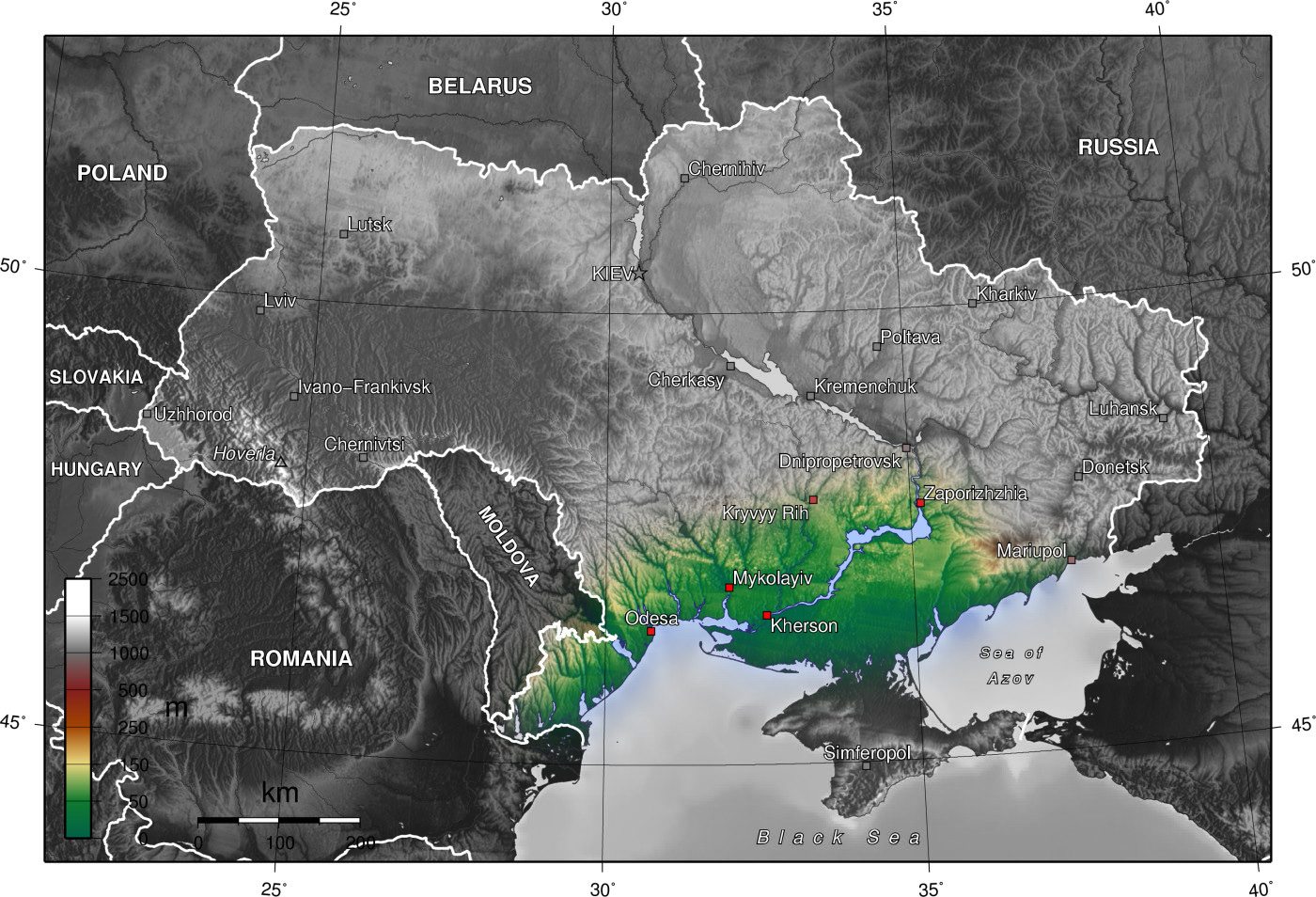
Black Sea Lowland

The Black Sea Lowland or Cisblack-sea Lowland (Ukrainian: Причорноморська низовина, romanized: Prychornomrska nyzovyna) is a major geographic feature of the Northern Pontic region and the East European Plain. It is almost completely within Southern Ukraine, covering half of its territory.

== Location ==
The lowland is located along the northern shores of the Black Sea, stretching from west to east from the Danubian Plain, contiguous with the Wallachian Plain and forming the Lower Danubian Plain, and Bugeac. Past Molochna River to the east, it transforms into a narrow Azov Littoral, Azov Lowland. To the south-east the Black Sea Lowland extends onto the Crimean peninsula, where it is known as the Crimean Lowland. The northern borders are composed of several uplands, such as the Moldavian Plateau, Podillia Upland, Dnieper Upland, Zaporizhian Ridge, and Azov Upland. The Azov, Crimean, and Bugeac lowlands are considered to be an extension of the Black Sea Lowland and its regional extremities.

== Description ==
The Black Sea Lowland is an accumulative, weakly divided plain that, being part of the greater Eastern European Plain, slopes gradually towards the Black Sea and the Sea of Azov.
