= MS400 turbofan engine =

Aircraft engine

MS400
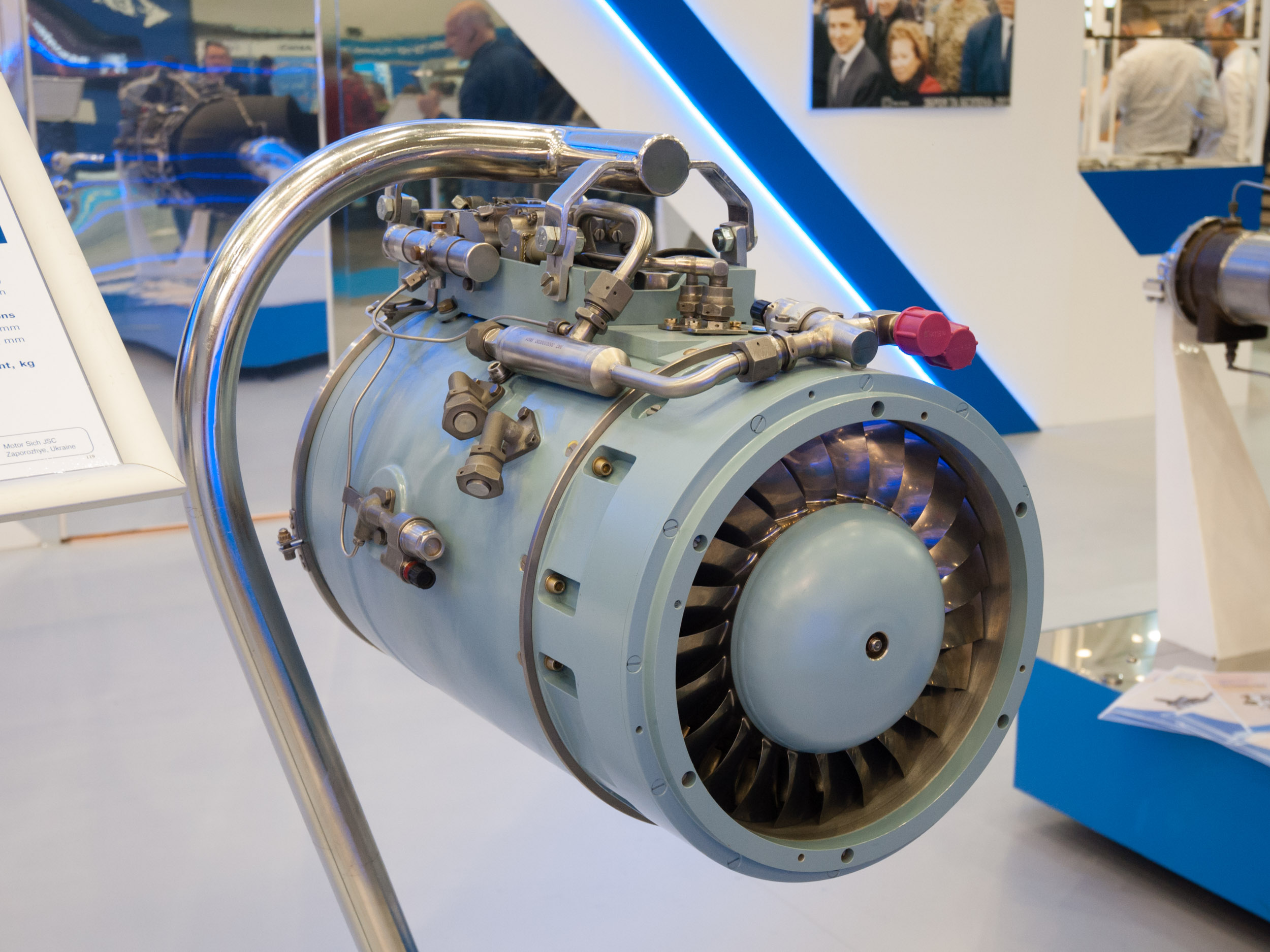
- MS450 turbofan engine, part of the MS400 engine family
- Type: Turbofan
- National origin: Ukraine
- Manufacturer: Motor Sich
- Major applications: R-360 Neptune
- Developed from: R-95-300
- Developed into: MS450

The MS400 (Ukrainian: MC-400) is a turbofan engine developed by the Ukrainian aircraft engine manufacturer Motor Sich. The engine is used for subsonic unmanned air vehicles, and is based on the earlier R-95-300 engine designed for use in the Kh-35/Kh-55 missiles. It was also proposed for the Turkish Gezgin missile.

== Specification ==
The engine's specifications are as follows:

==== General characteristics ====
- Type: turbofan
- Length: 846 mm (33.3 in)
- Diameter: 315 mm (12.4 in) with cowling
- Dry weight: 85 kg (187 lb)

==== Components ====
- Compressor:

==== Performance ====
- Maximum thrust: 3.96 kN (404 kgf; 890 lbf), ISA, SLS
- Specific fuel consumption: 22 g/(kN⋅s) (0.78 lb/(lbf⋅h))
- Thrust-to-weight ratio: 4.75

== Use ==
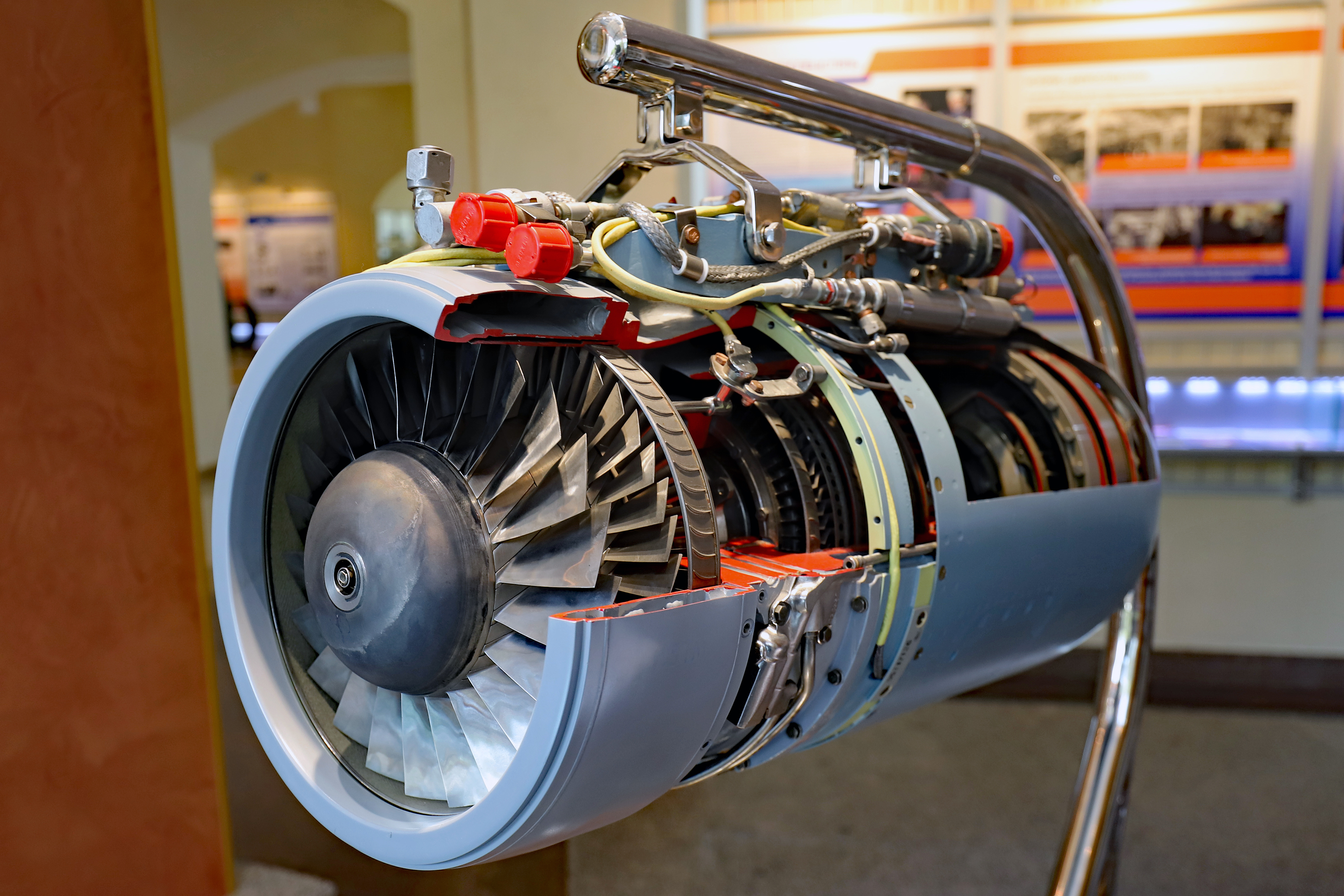
A cutaway model of the R-95-300 engine, which forms the basis for the MS400 engine.

The Luch Design Bureau in Kyiv designed a Ukrainian subsonic cruise missile with all-weather capabilities, the R-360 Neptune, with a range of up to 300 kilometres.

The MS400 is also studied for the development of Vietnam's VCM-01 cruise missile family.
