= Charming Harbor National Nature Park =

National park in Crimea

- Ukrainian: Національний природний парк «Чарівна гавань» Russian: Природный парк «Тарханкутский» Also: Tarkanhut National Park
- IUCN category II (national park)
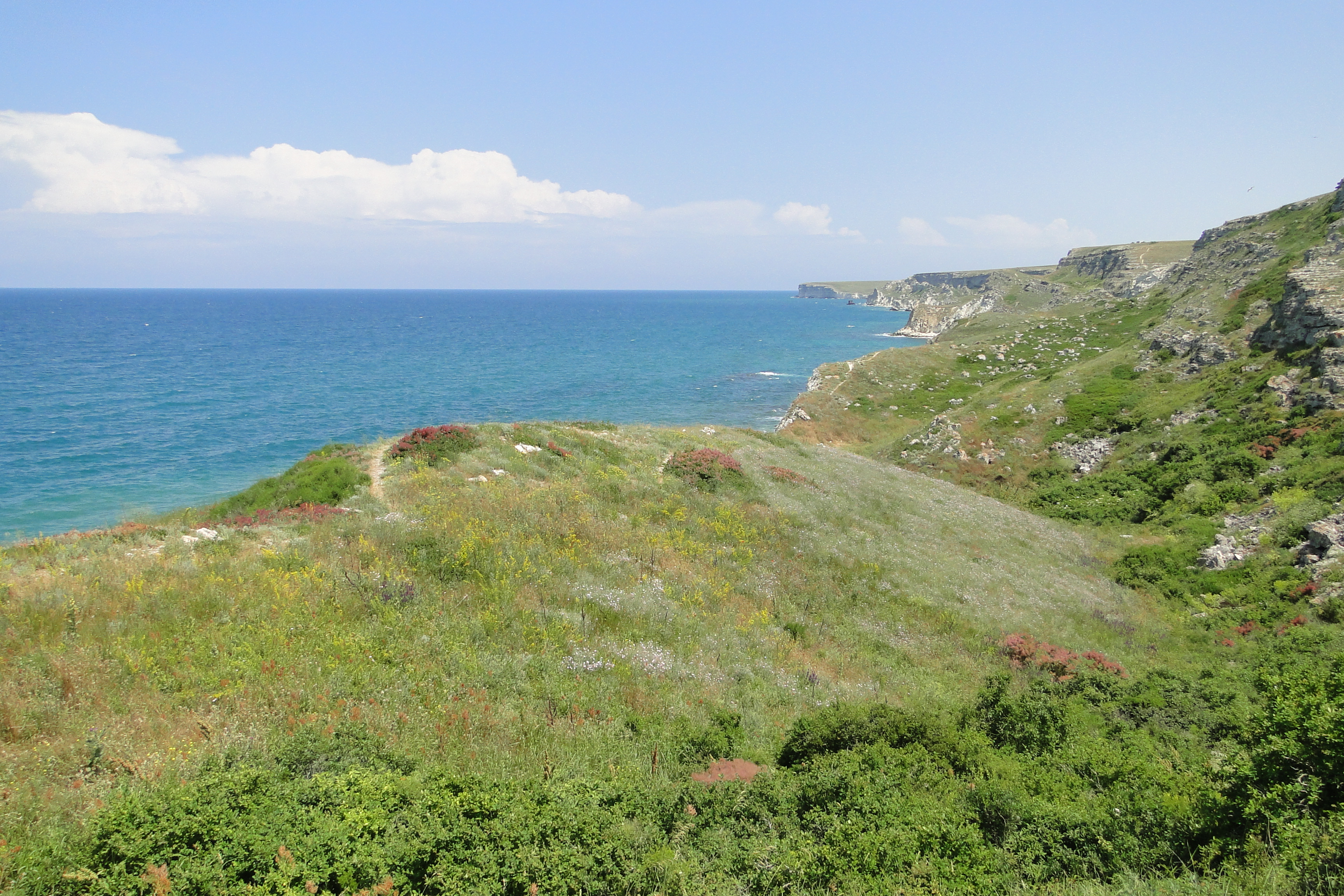
- Canğul coast

- Location within Crimea Location within Ukraine
- Location: Autonomous Republic of Crimea (de jure) / Republic of Crimea (de facto)
- Nearest city: Chornomorske
- Coordinates: 45.5°N 32.7°E
- Area: 10,900 hectares (26,934 acres; 109 km^{2}; 42 sq mi)
- Established: 2009
- Governing body: Ministry of Ecology and Natural Resources (Ukraine) / Ministry of Natural Resources and Environment (Russia)

The Charming Harbor National Nature Park or Tarkhankut National Park (Ukrainian: Національний природний парк «Чарівна гавань», romanized: Natsionalnyi pryrodnyi park «Charivna havan'»; Russian: Природный парк «Тарханкутский», romanized: Pryrodny park «Tarkhankutsky») covers a coastal sector of the Tarkhankut Peninsula (itself a part of the Crimean peninsula) on the Black Sea. The national park protects and exhibits steppe landscape as it descends to the seacoast in a semi-arid environment and with dramatic cliffs and rock formations. The park is in the administrative district of Chornomorske Raion.

== Topography ==
The park covers three separate sections of the western Crimean Peninsula, where the dry mountain steppe meets the Black Sea in a rugged and rocky coast. The three areas are:

- Bolshoy Castel, which features a gorge running down to a beach, and ruins of former settlements.
- Atlesh, a sector of significant coastal rock formations in the southern section of the park.
- Canğul, are area of "beams" or dry gullies with flat bottoms that are only periodically inundated. These formations, also referred to as "arroyos" in English, are typically 5 – 50 meters deep, and widen into rocky canyons as they reach the coast.

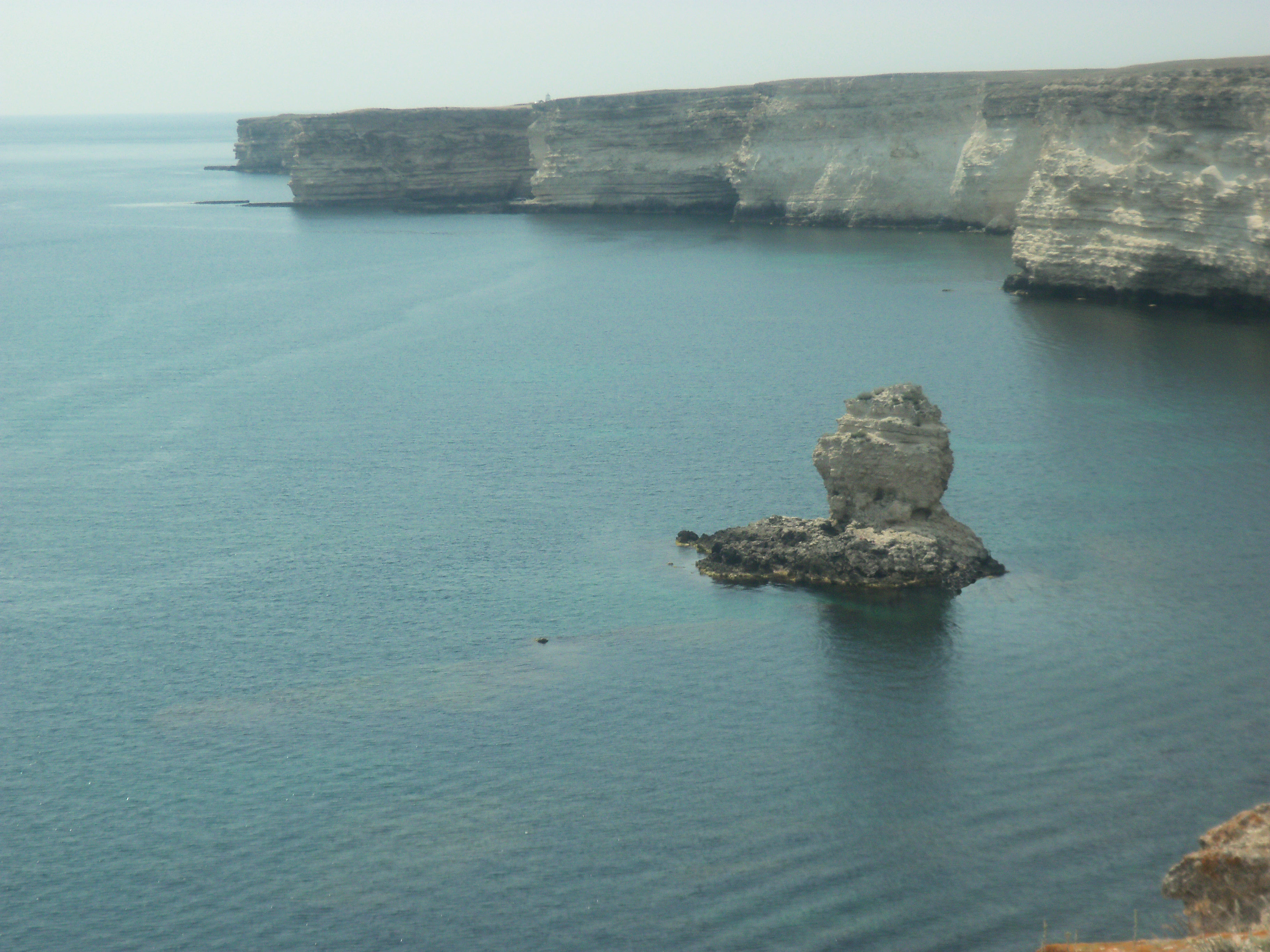
Atlesh coast

== Ecoregion and climate ==
The park is in the Pontic–Caspian steppe ecoregion. The official climate designation for the Tarkhanhut area is Humid continental climate - hot summer sub-type (Köppen climate classification Dfa), with large seasonal temperature differentials and a hot summer (at least four months averaging over 10 °C (50 °F), at least one of which is over 22 °C (72 °F). Park management claims 2,350 hours of sunshine per year. Summer runs from late May to mid-September, with 316 mm of average annual precipitation.

== Flora and fauna ==
The area is notable for preserving some of the last primeval coastal steppes, particularly in the gullies of the Castel sectors, where 50 plant species are found that are not generally found in the greater coastal steppes, and over 400 species of vascular plants have been recorded on site. Overall, the park includes coastal steppe, shrub-steppe, and shrub habitats.

== Public use ==
As a national park, NNP Charming Harbor is divided into four zones, providing for a protected area, a regulated recreation zone, a local recreation area, and an 'economic zone'. There are recreational facilities in each of the main sections, with heated cabins available for rent, boats, fishing, and campsites. Park administration requests checking in with the visitor center to register and for review of the park's rules. Hiking on the ecological trails in the protected zones requires escort by park staff.

== See also ==
- National Parks of Ukraine
