= Canğul =

Nature reserve and coast in Crimea

- Джангуль
- IUCN category IV (habitat/species management area)
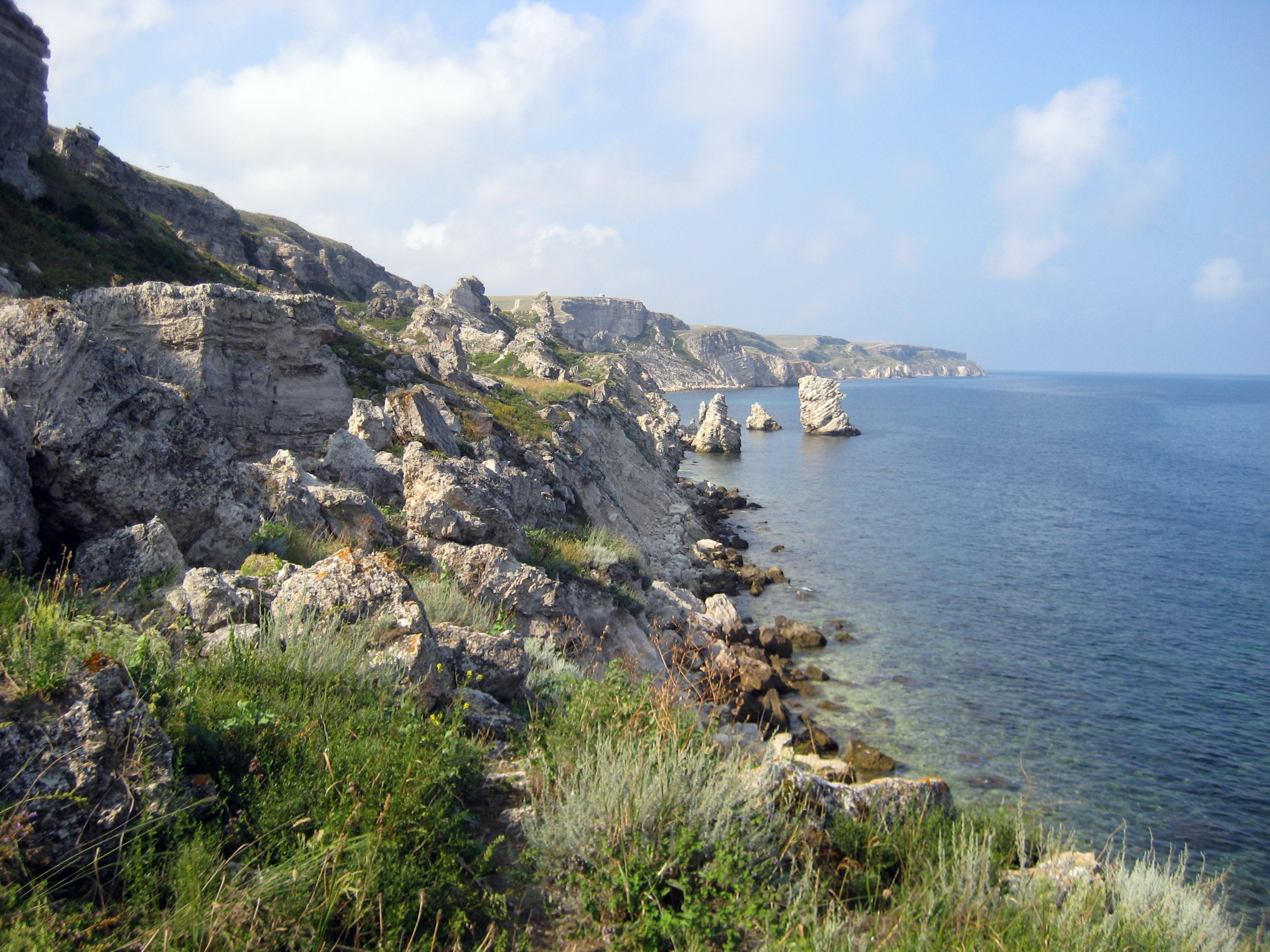

- Location within Crimea Location within Ukraine
- Nearest city: Yevpatoria
- Coordinates: 45°26′37″N 32°32′21″E
- Area: 10 ha (0.10 km^{2})
- Established: 20 May 1980

Canğul (Note: Russian and Ukrainian: Джангуль, romanized: Dzhangul, Dzhanhul), officially known in Russia as the Canğul landslide coast (Russian: Джангульское оползневое побережье, romanized: Dzhangulskoye opolznevoye poberezhye; Ukrainian: Джангульське оползневе узбережжя, romanized: Dzhanhul's'ke opolzneve uzberežž'a; Crimean Tatar: Canğul yer yılışuvlı yalısı)) is a coast and regional nature reserve (zakaznik) located on the Tarkhankut Peninsula in Crimea, a peninsula internationally recognised as part of Ukraine but occupied by Russia since 2014. It is part of the larger Charming Harbor National Nature Park.

== Description ==
Located on the Tarkhankut Peninsula, Canğul is known for its steep cliffs stretching up to 60 m (200 ft), several limestone formations, and frequent landslides. It is also noted for its white beaches and caves, many of which are only accessible by boat. In the law which established Canğul as a nature reserve, it was noted as an exhibition of erosion and their effects.

Canğul also serves as a resting spot for 90 species of birds, which serve as the most significant factor of local fauna. Other noteworthy species include wild rabbits. In terms of flora, the coast is dominated primarily by herbs and shrubbery, though a variety of flowers bloom during the spring.

== History ==
The name of Canğul is derived from a Persian term from the Middle Ages, literally meaning "soul of the flower".

The largest landslide in Canğul's history occurred in the summer of 1933, when a rock with a volume of 3,500,000m^{3} fell into the sea. On 20 May 1980, it was declared a regional nature reserve (zakaznik).

In 2005, the Sirius, a Russian-registered ship travelling from Yeysk to Turkey, partially sank after colliding with a rock formation off Canğul. The crew escaped uninjured, but the wreckage has remained, and has since become a local landmark.

In 2007, Viktor Yushchenko included Canğul in the Charming Harbor National Nature Park.
