= Tarkhankut Highlands =

Coordinates: 45.4191°N 32.7562°E

The Tarkhankut Upland or Tarkhankut Hills is a highland that covers most of the Tarkhankut Peninsula. It is part of the North Crimean Plain.

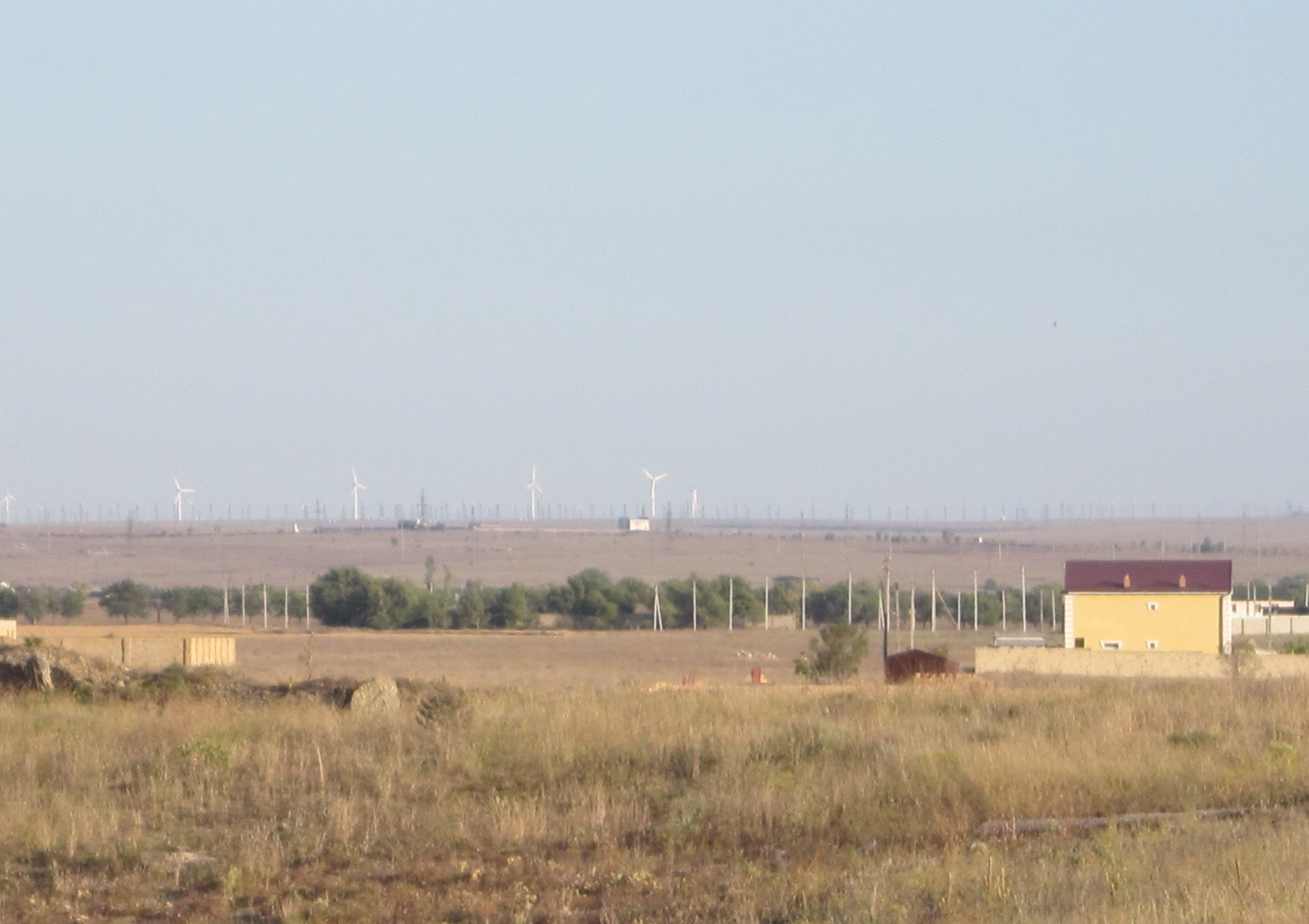
Wind power plant near Chornomorske

Its highest point is Melovoy Uval, 176 m. (In Russian geomorphology, uval is a type of elongated, elevated terrain). The Melovoy Uval is abundant in kurgans, and remnants of ancient settlements, including a hillfort at the highest point. In fact, stony kurgans are present in onther places of the highland, unevenly distributed.

The Tarkhankut Wind Farm (Tarkhankut Wind Plant, Ukrainian: Тарханкутська вітряна електростанція) is a wind power plant located at Donuzlav lake on the Tarkhankut Upland. It is a state property. Its construction was contracted to Windenergo Ltd., At the commissioning date of November 30, 2001, 21 wind turbines were installed with total capacity of 2.26 MW. The planned capacity was 70 MW.
