= Tarkhankut Peninsula =

Peninsula in Crimea

- Peninsula
- Tarkhankutskyi Peninsula
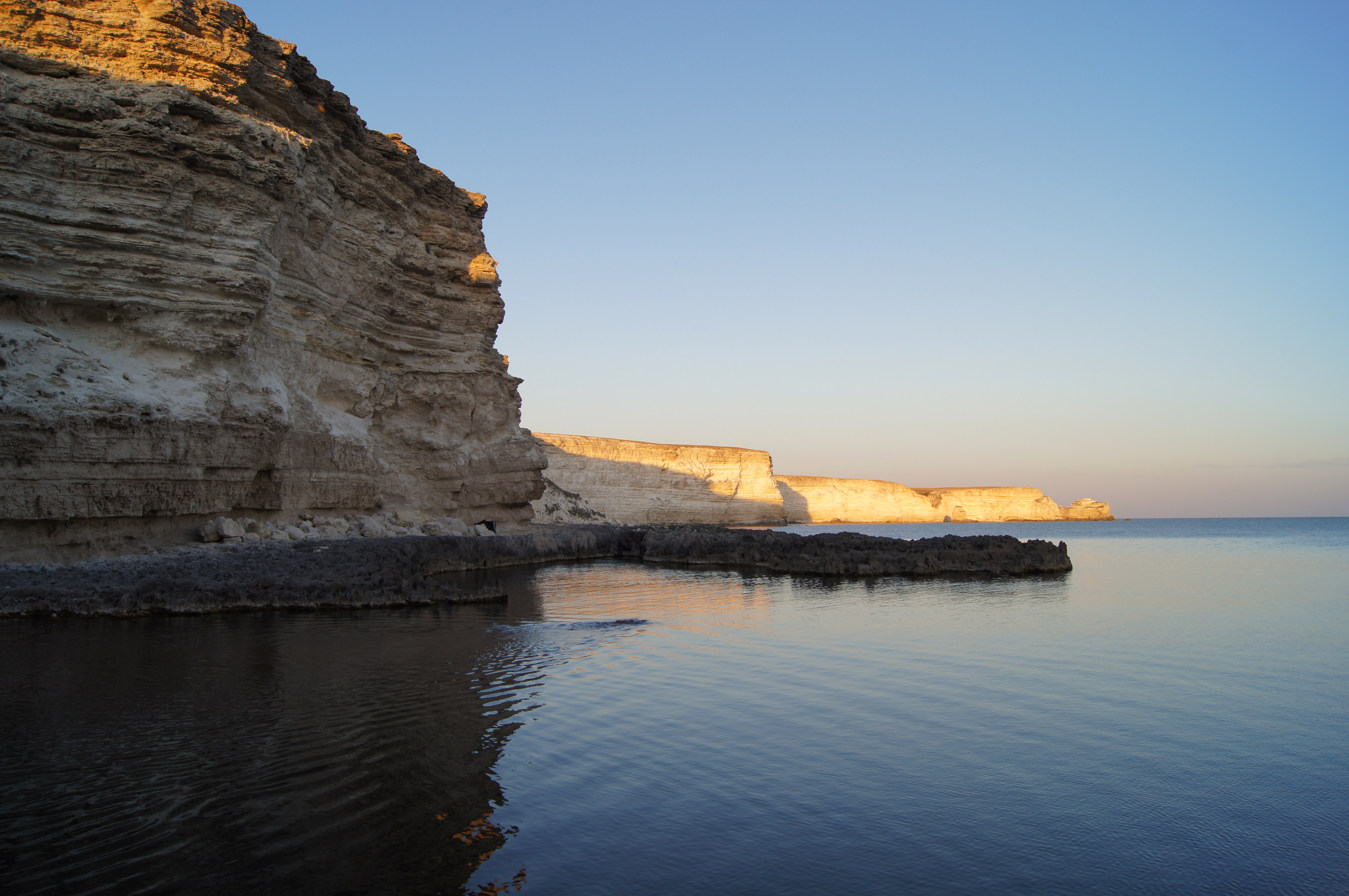
- The coastline to the east of Cape Tarkhankut

- Location within Crimea
- Interactive map of Tarkhankut Peninsula
- Coordinates: 45.4167°N 32.6667°E
- Location: Crimea
- Part of: Crimea

The Tarkhankut Peninsula (Ukrainian: Тарханкутський півострів, romanized: Tarkhankutskyi pivostriv; Crimean Tatar: Tarhanqut yarımadası; Russian: Тарханкутский полуостров) is the peninsula which constitutes the western extremity of Crimea into the Black Sea. Its northern shore is a southern coast of the Karkinit Bay. Its westernmost point is Cape Prybiynyi; to the south of it is Cape Tarkhankut. The terrain of the peninsula is the Tarkhankut Highlands.

== Geography ==
=== Cape Tarkhankut ===
Cape Tarkhankut is a south-western cape of the Peninsula. The Tarkhankut Lighthouse is located on the cape.

=== Tarkhankut Upland ===
The Tarkhankut Upland or Tarkhankut Hills is an upland that constitutes the Tarkhankut Peninsula.

The Tarkhankut Wind Farm is located by the Donuzlav lake on the Tarkhankut Upland.

=== Donuzlav ===
The Donuzlav Lake (Ukrainian: Донузлав) is a salty lake that is connected to the Black Sea via a ship channel and located at the southern shores of the peninsula.

== History ==
=== Russo-Ukrainian War ===
During the Russo-Ukrainian War, the Russian Armed Forces stationed the 3rd Radio Engineering Regiment to the region. The area was also equipped with S-400 missile system for air defense. On August 23, 2023, the Ukrainian military allegedly destroyed the site.

== See also ==
- Canğul
- Charming Harbor National Nature Park
