= 29th Naval Surface Ships Division =

29th Surface Ships Division 5th Naval Surface Ship Brigade (1996-2018)
- 29-й дивізіон надводних кораблів
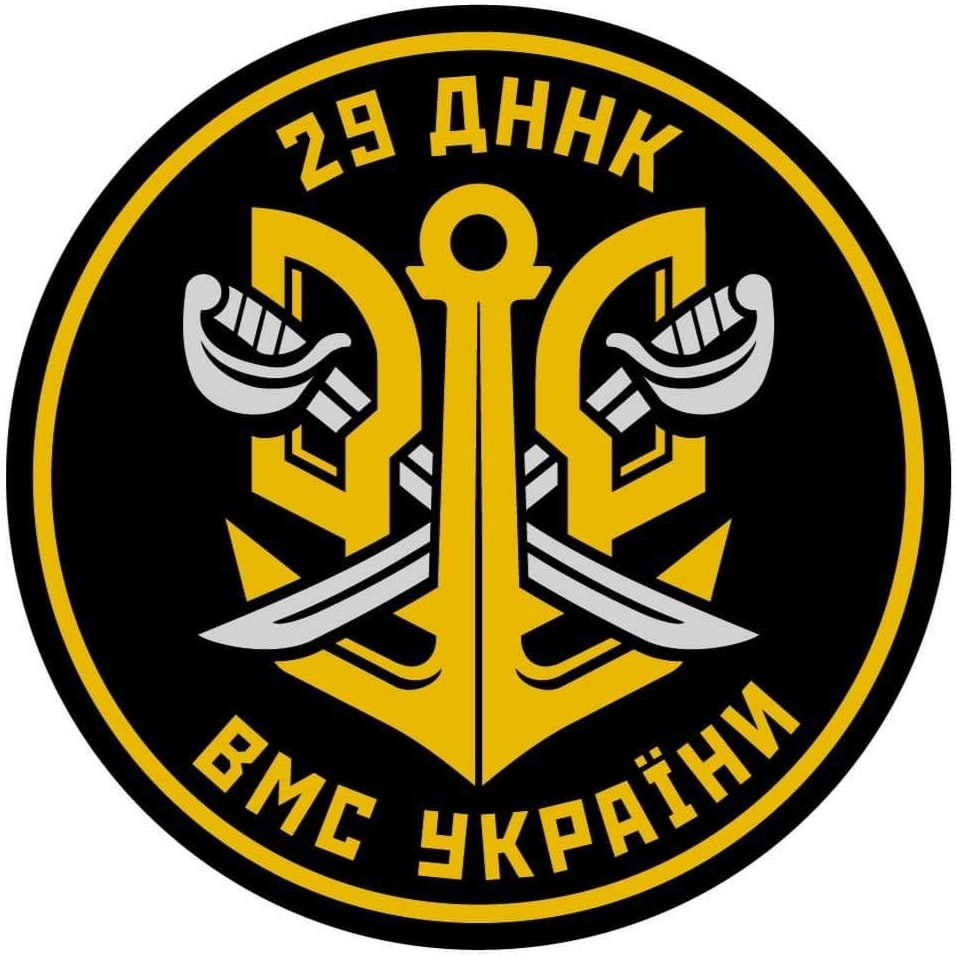
- Division Insignia
- Active: 1996 - present
- Country: Ukraine
- Branch: Ukrainian Navy
- Type: Division
- Role: Naval patrols, Coastal reconnaissance, anti sabotage operations, naval engagements
- Part of: Armed Forces of Ukraine
- Garrison/HQ: Ochakiv (2014-); Southern Naval Base (1996-2014)
- Engagements: Russo-Ukrainian War: Annexation of Crimea by the Russian Federation; War in Donbas; 2022 Russian invasion of Ukraine
- Decorations: For Courage and Bravery

Commanders
- Current commander: Dmytro Kovalenko

Insignia
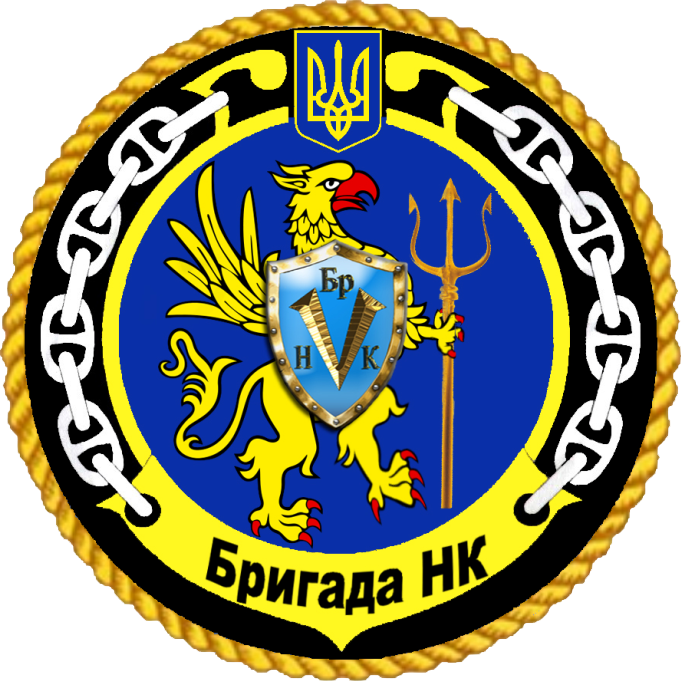
- Insignia of 5th Naval Surface Ship Brigade

The 28th Surface Ships Division formerly called as the 5th Naval Surface Ship Brigade is a division of the Ukrainian Navy based at Ochakiv. It was established in 1996 at the Southern Naval Base in Balaklava but was transferred following the Russian Invasion of Crimea.

== History ==
On March 22, 1996, it was established as 8th Brigade of Surface Ships at the Southern Naval Base, based in Balaklava, Sevastopol and was transferred to Ochakiv following the Russian Invasion of Crimea. In 2018, it was reformed into the 29th division of surface ships

On 21 March 2014 Yuri Olefirenko was surrendered to unmarked Russian naval personnel at Lake Donuzlav and was returned on April 19. On March 23, 2014, Henichesk engaged the Russian warships during the Russian Invasion of Crimea trying to break through the encirclement but was captured the next day and was returned on May 20.

On December 15, 2015, at 10:15 a.m, the brigade's ship Pereyaslav approached the Russian self-elevating floating drilling rig "Tavrida" and asked it to explain the purpose of its presence to which it showed no response.

On March 20, 2017, the brigade's warship Henichesk participated in PASSEX exercise with NATO warships in the Black Sea.

In August 2019, the Pereyaslav transported the 503rd Separate Marine Infantry Bataillon to the port of Poti in Georgia for exercise "Agile Spirit". After leaving Ukrainian waters it was followed by a Russian warship"Kasimov" and while returning two Russian ships"Zheleznyakov" and "Naberezhnye Chelny" tailed it back to Ukrainian waters.

In November 2019, the Ukrainian gunboat "Nikopol" which had been captured by Russia during the Kerch Strait incident was returned to Ukraine and the regiment's ship Pereyaslav escorted it to Ochakiv along with two Willard-type speedboats.

On July 7, 2020, the division's Svatov of the Naval Forces took part in naval exercises with the 88th Separate Marine Infantry Battalion.

On June 23, 2022, during the Russo-Ukrainian war, the division was awarded the honorary award For Courage and Bravery.

In April 2022 the ship was claimed by Russian media to have again been captured by Russia at the port of Berdyansk and that she may have been moved to Novorossiysk. However, on 3 June 2022 the division's ship Yuri Olefirenko was spotted in Ukrainian control near Ochakiv, Ukraine under fire by Russian artillery. The ship is believed to have survived the strikes and that it had not been captured at Berdyansk as previously claimed by Russian media.

In June 2022, the brigade's ship Henichesk was sunk by a Russian missile strike in the Black Sea.

On October 29, 2022, a video was published showing the division's ship Yuri Olefirenko firing the BM-14 at ground targets in the Kinburn Spit.

Russia's Defense Ministry said on 31 May 2023 that the division's ship had been destroyed two days prior. Russian Defense Ministry spokesman Igor Konashenkov claimed that the division's ship Yuri Olefirenko had been hit with "high-precision weapons" - a term he often uses to describe missiles. The Ukrainian Navy refused to comment.

== Vessels ==
- Pereyaslav (Reconnaissance Ship) (Note: Shared with 73rd Regiment)
- Svatov (Amphibious warfare ship) (Note: Shared with 73rd Regiment)
- Yuri Olefirenko (Logistical Ship) (Note: Allegedly Sunk)
- Henichesk (Minesweeper) (Note: Sunk)

== Commanders ==
- Vitaly Zvyagintsev (2012–2014)
- Dmytro Kovalenko (2014-)

== Sources ==
- Військово-Морські Сили
- УКРАЇНСЬКА КУМЕДІЯ НАД ЯКОЮ СМІЮТЬСЯ В США: 13 адміралів на 2 бригади кораблів ВМС!
- Військово-морські бази ВМС
- Тактичні навчання кораблів ВМС ЗС України.
- УКРАЇНА:ШЛЯХ ДО МОРЯ
- Готовий наклад нарукавних знаків для 5 бригади надводних кораблів
- Внезапная проверка готовности ВМСУ: морской десант, артиллерийские стрельбы и уничтожение условных диверсантов
- В Донузлаве заблокирована вся 5-я бригада надводных кораблей
- В Николаеве День ВМС отпраздновали с кораблями и самолетами
- "На Миколаївщині партнерами зі США розпочато будівництво морського операційного центру". mil.in.ua/. 2017-07-27. Archived from the original on 31 July 2017.
- "Донузлав-2014: Ніколи не здавайся!". radiosvoboda.org. Радіо «Свобода». 2018-02-19. Archived from the original on 20 February 2018.
