= Ukrainian ship Pereyaslav =

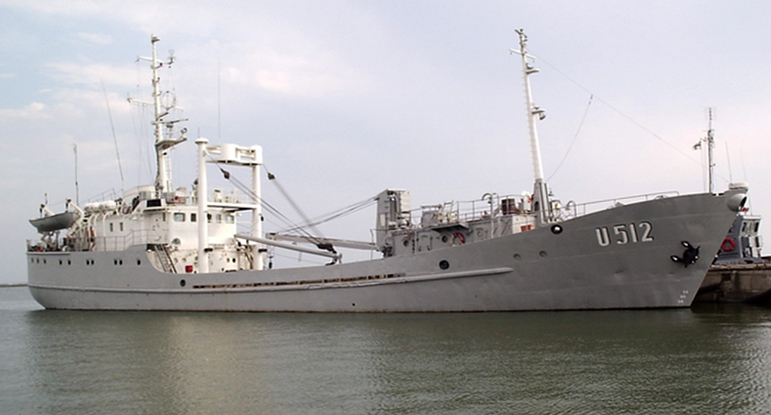
- Pereyaslav in March 2011

History

Soviet Union Hydrographic Service
- Name: GS-13
- Laid down: 5 November 1985
- Launched: 30 November 1986
- Commissioned: 10 January 1987
- In service: 5 November 1985 (Hydrographic Service)
- Out of service: 28 November 1995
- Fate: Transferred to Ukraine in 1995

Ukraine Ukrainian Navy
- Namesake: Pereyaslav
- Acquired: 1995
- Commissioned: 1 December 1995
- Renamed: Pereyaslav (1997)
- Home port: Mykolaiv
- Identification: A512 (1997–2018, U512)
- Status: In service
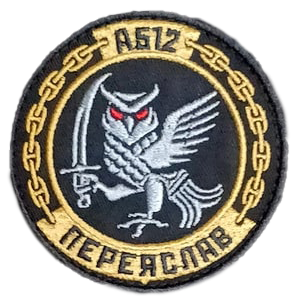
- Badge

General characteristics
- Displacement: 912 tons
- Length: 54.2 m (177 ft 10 in)
- Beam: 9.3 m (30 ft 6 in)
- Draft: 3.95 m (13 ft 0 in)
- Speed: 11 knots (20 km/h; 13 mph)
- Complement: 30
- Armament: 2 × positions for MANPADs MTU-4

Pereyaslav is a small reconnaissance ship of the project 1824B (type "Uhlomyer", Muna class by NATO classification), a special purpose ship of the 29th Division of the Naval Forces of Ukraine. It was originally named GS-13 under the Hydrographic Service of the Soviet Union Navy, but after the dissolution of the Soviet Union this vessel was released from the Russian military.

== Project features ==
Pereyaslav is a type of single-deck self-propelled marine vessel. 1824B Project - special purpose ships - the carriers of underwater vehicles designed on the base of the project of small marine transport of armaments. By 1977, in order to hide the true purpose of these ships, the project was classified as small hydrographic vessels. The ships of this range were built at shipyards factories "Vympel" (Rybinsk, Yaroslavl Oblast, RSFSR) and "Baltics" (Klaipėda, Lithuanian SSR). Between 1976-1989 four ships were built for this project, Anemometer (1976), Gyro (1978), GS-13 (1986), Uhlomyer (1989).

Although the ships of the project 1824B are classified as small reconnaissance ships, they do not have on board a means of radio and electronic intelligence. Special weapons on them include means of hidden release and receive of intelligence divers and delivery of underwater vehicles.

== History of the ship ==
A small hydrographic vessel with a serial number 701 was built in the dock of the shipyard factory "Baltic" in Klaipeda city of Lithuanian SSR on 5 November 1985. The vessel, known by the USSR Navy as GS-13, was launched on 30 November 1986. On 24 December 1986 the crew began living on the ship. The first team was formed from the personnel of the special purpose units - 15 soldiers. The command structure was formed from officers of reconnaissance ships with marine specialties. The first commander of the ship was the captain of the 3rd rank Oboloshev.

The first course task the crew passed with a mark "good" directly on the plant to the command of battalion of reconnaissance ships which were stationed in Baltiysk city. On 30 May 1987 the ship headed for Leningrad, where it was moored near the bridge of Lieutenant Schmidt. On 1 June, the ship began the transition by inland waterways to the Black Sea, escorted by tug.

The transition was made by the Neva River - Lake Ladoga - the Svir River - Lake Onega - Volga-Baltic channel - channel Beloozersk - Rybinsk Reservoir - River Volga - Don River - Sea of Azov - Kerch Strait - Black Sea - Sevastopol. In October, the ship moved to the military port of Ochakiv city, where it was subordinated to the 17th separate crew of special purpose of the Black Sea Fleet (today 73rd Naval Special Operations Center (Ukraine)).

On 28 November 1995, the ship was transferred to the complement of Naval Forces of Ukraine and returned to the place of its preliminary deployment in the military port of Ochakiv. On 1 December the Ukrainian naval flag was raised. In 1997, the ship was named Pereyaslav and assigned hull number U512. For the past 15 years (as of 2011), the ship has been owned by Pereyaslav-Khmelnitsky city.

On 19 June 2012, BSS took the ship to repair mechanical parts, special equipment and devices. The control of the repair work was monitored by the representatives of the Naval Forces of Ukraine.

In August 2019, Pereyaslav was sailing to Georgia to participate in exercise Agile Spirit 2019 and while in neutral waters, the crew received a warning over the radio from a Russian Navy ship. The Russians warned that the Ukrainians needed to turn away because the area was allegedly blocked. International coordinators did not confirm that fact, so the captain of Pereyaslav decided to maintain the vessel along its original course. Soon thereafter, Kasimov, a large Russian Project 1124M/Grisha V-class anti-submarine corvette, was spotted near the Ukrainian ship. The Russian corvette's aggressive behavior only ceased when a Turkish reconnaissance plane arrived close to Pereyaslav.

On 20 November 2019, the ship towed the vessel Nikopol to the port of Ochakiv, after Nikopol was damaged and seized by the Russian Federation near the Kerch Strait in November 2018.

According to Russian military sources, Pereyaslav was hit by gunfire as a result of a Russian special forces operation in the mouth of the Dnieper on 30 March 2022, during the Russian invasion of Ukraine.
