= Kozachyi Island =

Island in Ukraine

Острів Козачий
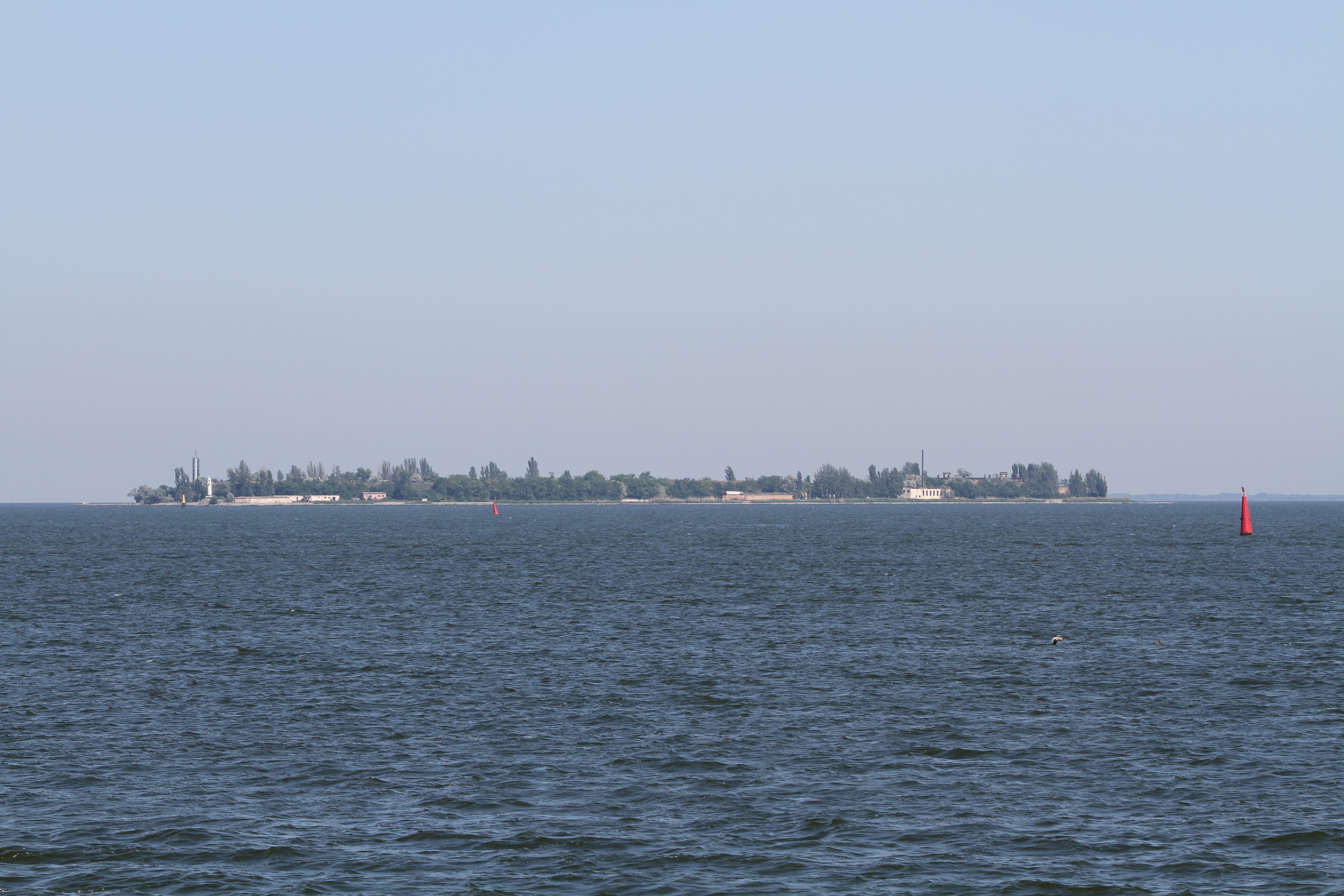
- View of the island in 2012
- Location of the island

Geography
- Coordinates: 46°34′20″N 31°33′35″E
- Area: 0.073 km^{2} (0.028 sq mi)
- Length: 1.4 km (0.87 mi)

Administration
- Ukraine
- Oblast: Mykolaiv Oblast
- Raion: Mykolaiv Raion
- Hromada: Ochakiv urban hromada

Demographics
- Population: 0

Kozachyi Island (Ukrainian: Острів Козачий), formerly known as Pervomaiskyi Island (Ukrainian: Острів Первомайський), is an artificial island in the Black Sea, and is located between the Kinburn Spit and Ochakiv at the mouth of the Dnieper–Bug estuary. The island has historically been used as a military fort to blockade the Dnipro river.

== Naming ==
The island was originally named "Batareinyi Island" (meaning battery) before being renamed to "Pervomaiskyi Island" in 1920. Locals usually called the island "Maiskyi Island" (Острів Майський).

On 17 January 2025, the Cabinet of Ministers renamed the island to "Kozachyi Island" as part of decommunization in Ukraine.

== History ==
=== Planning and construction ===
Following the 7th Russo-Turkish War, Ochakov came under the rule of the Russian Empire. Grigory Potemkin then ordered the destruction of Turkish fortifications in the city.

As a result, new fortifications are needed to defend the area. There were claims that General Alexander Suvorov and Empress Catherine II first came up with the idea of constructing artificial islands as military forts in the Dnieper–Bug estuary during the 1790s, but archival evidence do not support this theory. Rather, the first recorded proposals were from the 1850s, with the island being located about 150 fathoms away from the Kinburn Spit. The designs were from François Sainte de Wollant, but were rejected by military leadership at the time. However, following Russian defeat in the Crimean War, this idea was again taken up for implementation.

In 1873, in anticipation of the 11th Russo-Turkish War, Emperor Alexander II ordered the construction of an artillery fort on an artificial island in the mouth of the Dnieper–Bug estuary. On 17 August 1874, Ministry of War Dmitry Milyutin approved the construction plan from famous engineer-General Eduard Totleben, and actual construction began soon afterwards.

Construction work paused during the 11th Russo-Turkish War, and the island was armed with 11-inch guns from Kronstadt Fortress and new 9-inch mortars for the war. Construction resumed after the war and was completed by 1880 based on the original plan. By 1881, the island had a pier, warehouses, 40 casemates, and a railway branch. All construction plans planned after the war were completed in 1891.

=== Military base ===
In November 1905, Pyotr Schmidt was arrested and held at this island for leading the 1905 Russian Revolution. He was later transferred to Berezan Island before being shot. Today, Kozachyi island has a memorial in honor of Schmidt and the crew of Potemkin who participated in the revolution.

By the outbreak of World War I, there were four 152 mm 45 caliber Pattern 1892 installed on the island. During the Russian Civil War, the island was controlled by the Red Army until July 1919, when the White army took over the island. Two of the four artillery guns were destroyed in the fighting. The island saw naval battles between the two sides, and its fortifications became strategically important for both sides to control.

In the early 1930s, the island's shoreline was reinforced with concrete, earthen ramparts were built up on the island itself, and the casemates were strengthened—their walls were increased in thickness to 2.5 meters. An artesian well was also drilled to supply the garrison with water.

During World War II, the island had four 203-mm coastal and four 76-mm anti-aircraft guns, and the Red Army evacuated the island by September 1941 following heavy German bombardment. Despite this, the island garrison held out for another six months before falling to German troops.

In 1953, the Soviet Main Intelligence Directorate established several naval reconnaissance posts on the island, including the 17th Separate Special Forces Brigade. During this time, the island was strictly for military use and was closed to civilians. On 1 January 1990, the 17th Separate Special Forces Brigade was reorganized as the 1464th Reconnaissance Point.

Following the collapse of the Soviet Union, the island has served as the garrison for the 7th Separate Special Operations Brigade in the Ukrainian Navy. This unit inaugurated its first officers in April 1992 and swore allegiance to the Armed Forces of Ukraine.

On 11 October 2003, the military unit A1594 celebrated its 50th anniversary and was renamed as the 73rd Naval Special Operations Center. The unit then moved to Ochakiv in 2004, leaving a small garrison behind on the island. As a result, the island has been mostly abandoned and defunct since the unit moved away. An additional reason was that a dredger accidentally damaged the power line that connected the island to the mainland while deepening a shipping channel.

Since the beginning of the Russo-Ukrainian war in 2014, the island has become a base for the Special Operations Center "South". The island also hosted exercises for Marine Corps cadets in 2020.
