= 8th Naval Raid Protection Ships Division =

8th Raid Protection Ships Division (2018-) 8th Security and Support Division (2014-2018) 8th Support Ships Division (1994-2014)
- 8-й дивізіон кораблів охорони рейду
- Active: 1994 - present
- Country: Ukraine
- Branch: Ukrainian Navy
- Type: Division
- Role: Naval patrols, Coastal reconnaissance, anti sabotage operations
- Part of: Ukrainian Navy
- Garrison/HQ: Ochakiv; Southern Naval Base (1994-2014)
- Engagements: Russo-Ukrainian War: Russian Invasion of Crimea; War in Donbas; 2022 Russian invasion of Ukraine

8th Division of Raid Protection Ships is a division of the Ukrainian Navy currently based in Ochakiv. It was established in 1994 at Southern Naval Base in Crimea. It is tasked with patrolling Ukrainian waters and coastal defense and operates a variety of different ships.

== History ==
It was established in 1994 as the 8th Support Vessels Division at the Southern Naval Base but after the Russian Invasion of Crimea, its remnants were moved to Ochakiv becoming the 8th Security and Support Division. In 2018, it was renamed as the 8th Raid Protection Ships Division.

In March 2014, during the Russian Invasion of Crimea, the vessels Horlakiv and Novoozerne of the division was captured by Russians and the flag of the Black Sea Fleet was raised on it, they were returned to Ukraine on April 19, 2014.

The division's vessel Horlakiv took part in a joint exercise with the American Navy in 2019.

During the Russo-Ukrainian war, the division saw action in multiple engagements. The vessel of the division Netishyn, laid Naval mines from February 24 to May 23, 2022, in the Black Sea off the coast of Ukraine performing combat operations in close proximity to Russian warships amidst aerial raids conducted by the Russian Air Force. Netishyn was also involved in the search for dead personnel from the Island-type patrol boat P190 "Slovyansk" and the trawler U360 "Henichesk", sunk by Russian aircraft. They retrieved dead bodies as well as artillery and communications equipment from the destroyed ships.

== Vessels ==
- Netishyn (Patrol vessel) (Note: Jointly Operated with 73rd Naval Special Operations Center (Ukraine) as a Diving support vessel)
- Horlivka (Logistics vessel)
- Dobropillya (Patrol vessel)
- Novoozerne (Tugboat)

== Commanders ==
- Dmytro Volodymyrovych Markov (2016–2017)
- Lisovoy Volodymyr Volodymyrovych (2018-)
