= Ukrainian patrol boat Skadovsk =

Zhuk class ( Project 1400M Grif-M) patrol boat of the Ukrainian Navy

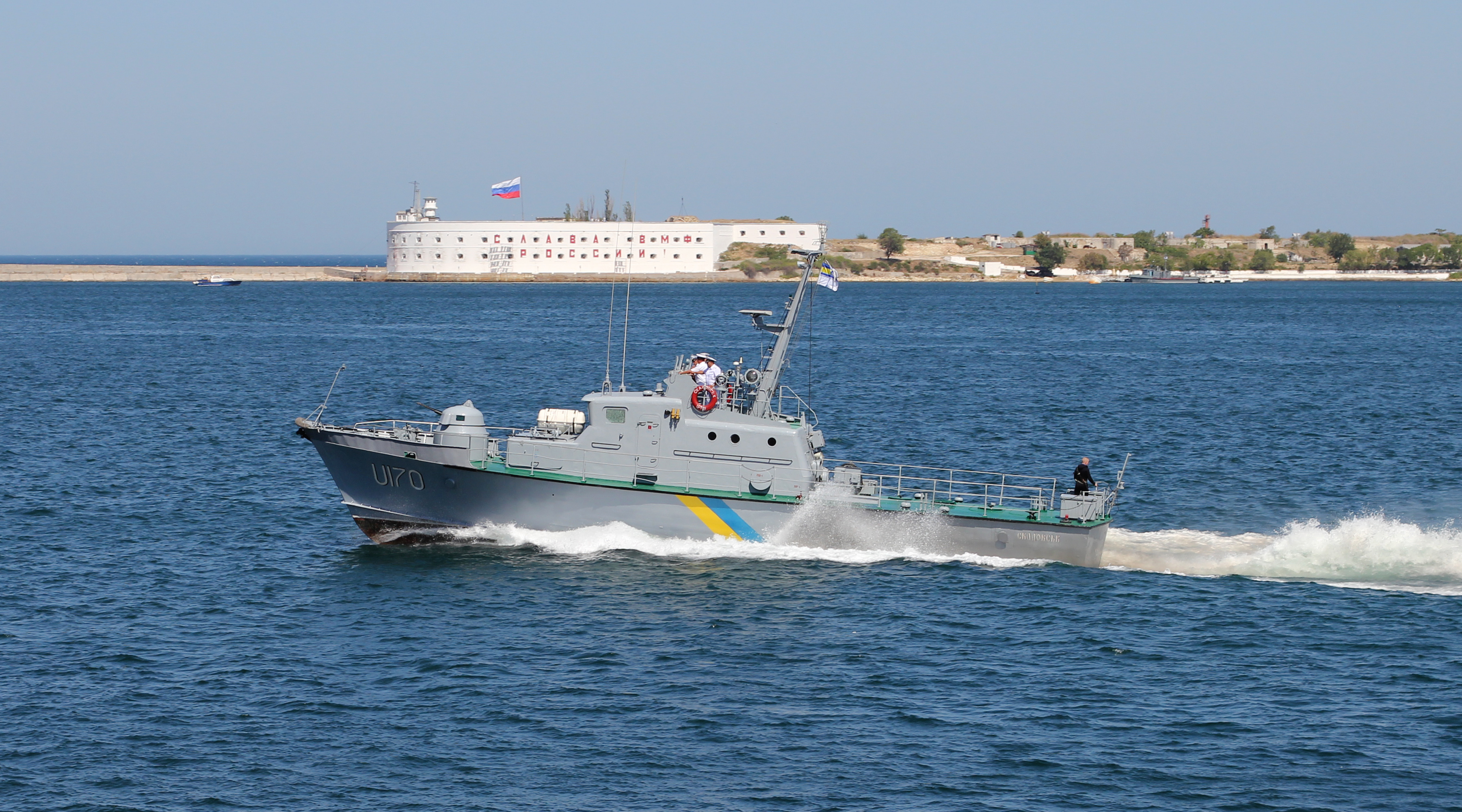
- Skadovsk in 2012

History

Soviet Union
- Name: АК-327
- Builder: More Shipyard PO, Feodosia
- Yard number: 888
- Launched: 1990
- Commissioned: 1990
- In service: 1990
- Out of service: 15 April 1992
- Home port: Ochakiv
- Fate: Transferred to Ukraine 15 April 1992

Ukraine
- Name: Haydamak (1992–1997); Skadovsk (1997–present)
- Namesake: Haydamak (1992–1997); Skadovsk (1997–present)
- Operator: Ukrainian Navy
- In service: 15 April 1992
- Refit: 2017, 2021
- Home port: Western Naval Base "South", Odesa MUN А2951
- Identification: Pennant number: P170 (2018–present); U170 (1997–2018); U120 (1992–1997)
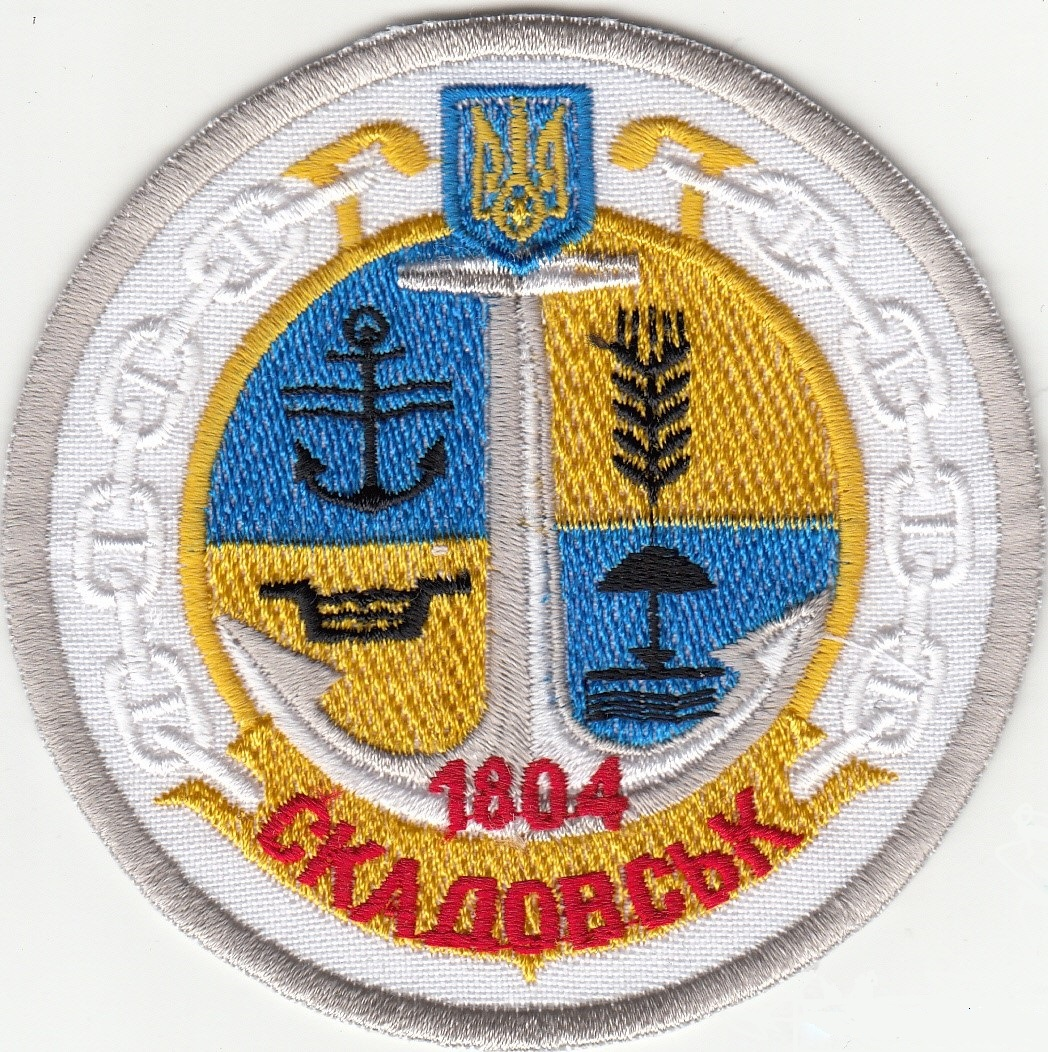
- Badge

General characteristics
- Class & type: Zhuk-class patrol boat
- Displacement: 35.9 long tons (36 t) standard; 39.7 long tons (40 t) full load
- Length: 23.8 m (78 ft 1 in)
- Beam: 5.15 m (16 ft 11 in)
- Draft: 1 m (3 ft 3 in)
- Installed power: Diesel-direct: 2 Type M401B diesels (2 x MTU/CAT; 2 x 1,000 @ 2,300 rpm)
- Speed: 29 knots (54 km/h; 33 mph)
- Range: 450 nmi (830 km; 520 mi) at 13 kn (24 km/h; 15 mph)
- Endurance: 5 days
- Complement: 9 (1 officer, 2 warrant officers)
- Armament: 2 x twin 12.7 mm (0.50 in) NSV machine gun

Skadovsk (P170) (Ukrainian: Скадовськ) is a Project 1400M Grif-M (NATO code: Zhuk class) small patrol gunboat of the Ukrainian Navy. Built in 1990, she has been in Ukrainian Navy service since 1992.

== History ==
=== 1990–1992 ===
In 1990 small patrol gunboat Project 1400M Grif-M, was laid down at More Shipyard PO Feodosia Autonomous Republic of Crimea. Boats Yard number was #888. The same year it began service with Black Sea Fleet of the Soviet Navy under the name АК-327. The ship was assigned to 17th separate special purpose brigade, which on 1 January 1990 became the 1464th naval reconnaissance station MUN 34391, based in Ochakiv.

=== 1992–2014 ===
When Ukraine became independent, the boat along with 1464th naval reconnaissance station held a new military oath ceremony, thus becoming part of Ukrainian Navy on 9 April 1992. Some sources list this date as 15 April 1992. The ship was given the new pennant number U120 and renamed Haydamak after an old military unit designation.

The 1464th naval reconnaissance station was increased in size and became 7th Separate Special Operations Brigade.

In 1993 the boat was used to destroy a sea mine, which was found floating near city of Izmail. In 1996 the vessel was also used to destroy an aerial bomb near a pier in Kherson.

On 1 November 1997 the ship's name was changed to Skadovsk, after the Ukrainian city, while the number remained U120. This was later changed to U170.

Skadovsk intercepted a ship while operating in the Dnieper–Bug estuary during the US-Ukrainian military exercise on Tendra Spit in 2001.

The 7th Separate Special Operations Brigade became the 73rd Maritime Special Operations Center in 2003–2004. From 2003 to 2007, the ship was assigned to the 73rd Maritime Special Operations Center.

In 2011, the boat was recognized as the best in the level of training and interaction among the crews of the Division of Protection and Supply Ships of the Western Naval Base "South".

In 2012, Skadovsk was serving as part of 1st separate division of protection and maintenance of the water area.

In January 2013, when the 24th separate River Boat Division based at Western Naval Base "South" was created, Skadovsk was assigned to that unit. On 16 May 2013 the ship completed a ten-day tour up the Danube river, under the command of Starshy michman Andrii Dus.

=== 2014–present ===
During Annexation of Crimea by the Russian Federation in March 2014, most of the Ukrainian Navy vessels were captured by Russian forces. Skadovsk was one of ten ships that remained under Ukrainian control. When in 2014, the 24th River Boat Division was disbanded, its former units were transferred to 1st Division of Protection and Security.

Skadovsk underwent repairs from March to June 2017 by the Southern Shipbuilding Company at the Black Sea Shipyard. Repairs were done at cost of ₴ 2,700,000.

Taking part in the Exercise Sea Breeze 2017 on the night of 18/19 July, the boat was playing a role of emergency ship during a tactical exercise. The next day, Skadovsk, commanded by Starshy michman Dus, was patrolling the Danube when the ship ran aground at a speed of 18 knots (33 km/h; 21 mph) resulting in ₴ 1,350,000 in damages. Dus was charged with Article 417, violation of rules of navigation of the Criminal Code of Ukraine On 24 October 2017 the Ukrainian Navy Command contracted the Southern Shipbuilding Company to make repairs to boats hull to fix multiple holes and cracks. Repairs were planned to finish by 24 November of the same year and cost ₴ 2,099,000. By 12 December 2017 boat was repaired at Mykolayiv shipyard of the Smart Maritime Group jointly with the Southern Shipbuilding Company.

In 2021 boat was due for another refit. On 3 May a contract was awarded to Mykolayiv Shipyard. Skadovsk began dock repairs on 13 October. As of 20 December it was still under repair.

The vessel took part in many annual Sea Breeze exercises: 2001, 2007, 2008, 2009, 2010, 2011, 2012, 2013, 2014, 2015, 2016, 2017, 2018, 2019.

== Past commanders ==
- Starshy michman Andrii Dus 2011–2018

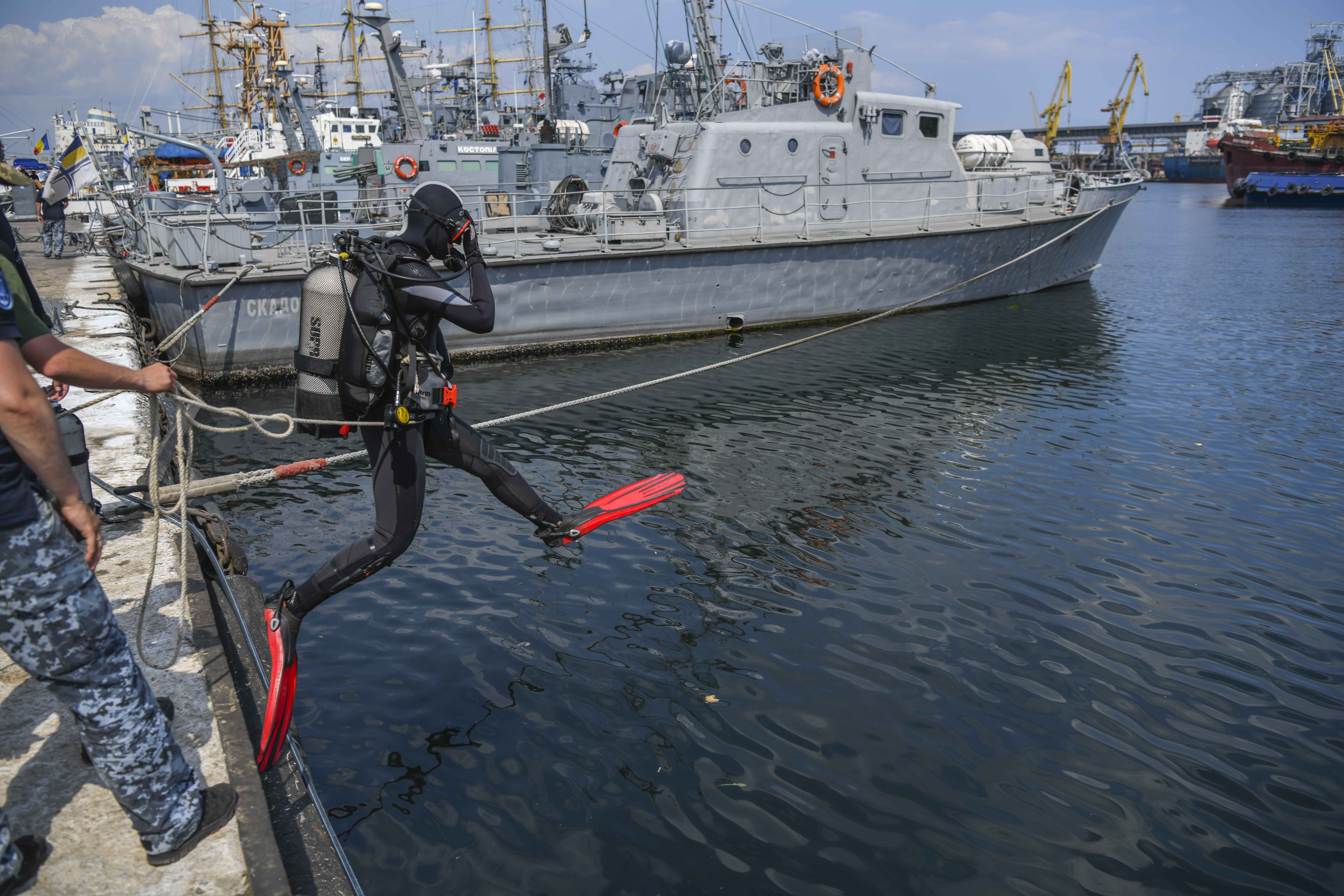
Sea Breeze 2021 exercise

== Sources ==
- "ПСКА проект 1400" [PSKA project 1400], Russian Navy of the 20th century (in Russian), archived from the original on 6 July 2015
- "Скадовськ" [Skadovsk], River and Sea Vessels' Gallery and Database (in Russian), archived from the original on 17 February 2023
- "PATROL CRAFT "GRIF" PROJECT 1400M", SpetsTechnoExport, archived from the original on 19 August 2014
- "Артиллерийский катер "Скадовск"" [Artillery cutter Skadovsk], vmsu.info (in Russian), archived from the original on 5 July 2017
- "Катера проекта 1400 "Гриф"" [Cutters Project 1400 "Grif"], war-book.ru (in Russian)
