= Ukrainian ship Yuri Olefirenko =

Project 773 landing ship of the Ukrainian Navy

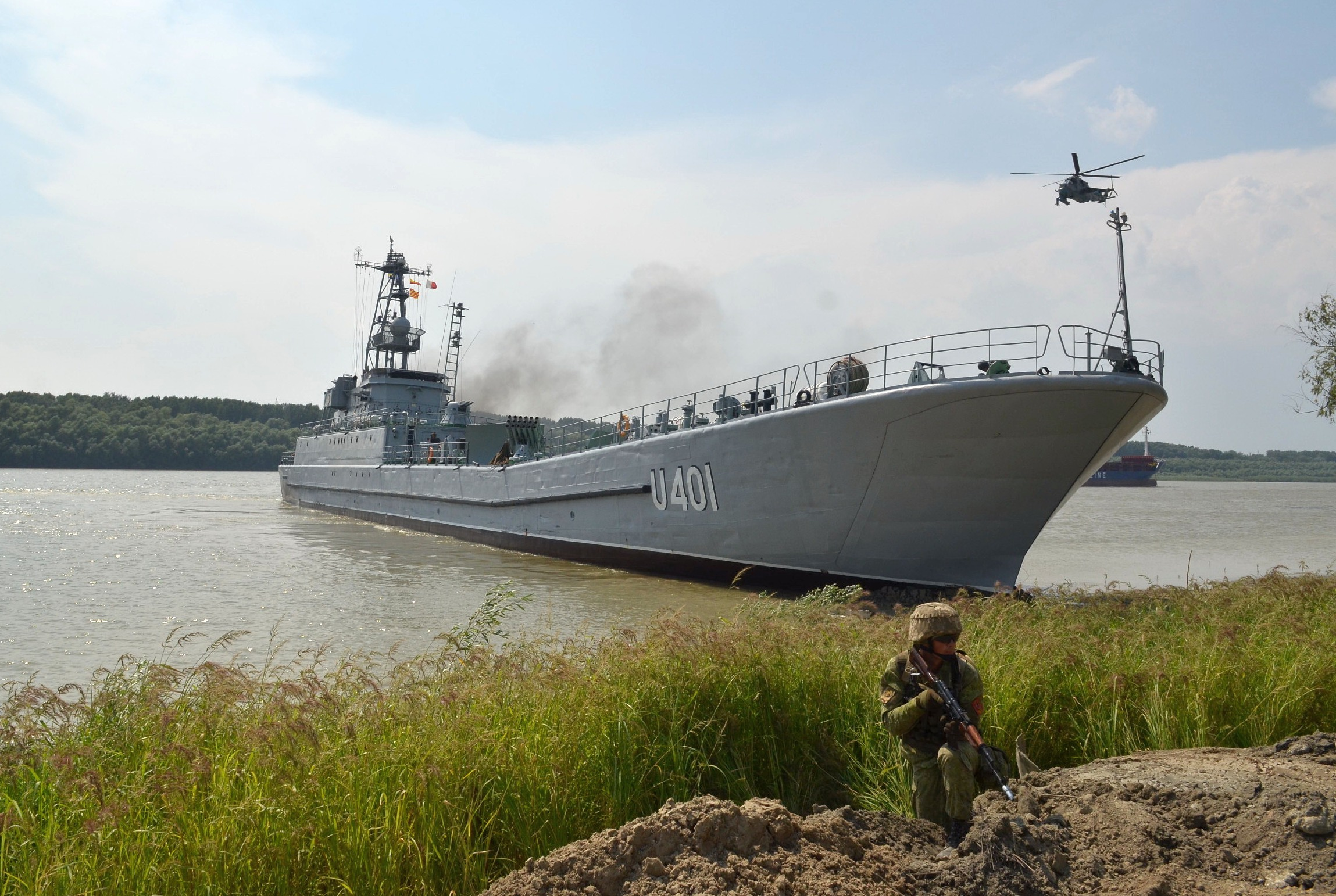
- Yuri Olefirenko

History

Soviet Navy
- Name: SDK 137
- Laid down: 21 April 1970
- Launched: 31 December 1970
- Commissioned: 31 May 1971
- Fate: Transferred to Ukrainian Navy in 1994

Ukraine
- Name: Yuri Olefirenko (ex-SDK Kirovohrad)
- Commissioned: 10 January 1996
- Status: Unclear; may have been destroyed or damaged in 2023
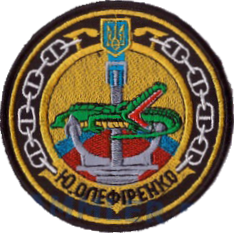
- Badge

General characteristics
- Class & type: Polnocny-class landing ship
- Displacement: 1,192 tons
- Length: 81.3 m (266 ft 9 in)
- Beam: 9.3 m (30 ft 6 in)
- Draft: 2.3 m (7 ft 7 in)
- Speed: 18 knots (33 km/h; 21 mph)
- Complement: 41
- Armament: 2 x 2 30 mm artillery AK-230; 2 x 18 140 mm launch system NURS "WM18" type; 2 x 4 MPADS launch system Strela-3

Yuri Olefirenko (Ukrainian: Юрій Олефіренко) is a mid-size Project 773 (NATO code: Polnocny-C) landing ship of the Ukrainian Navy. From her original commissioning in 1971 until the 2014 Russian annexation of Crimea, she was based in the Southern Naval Base at Donuzlav. Since then Yuri Olefirenko was relocated to Ochakiv. She was subordinated to the 29th Surface Ships Division. She was reportedly captured by Russian forces during the 2022 Russian invasion of Ukraine before being spotted still in active service on 3 June 2022. In 2023, a Russian report claimed the vessel had been destroyed.

== Construction and career ==
=== Soviet service ===
The ship was built at Stocznia Północna (pl) shipyard in Gdańsk, Poland in 1970 for the Soviet Navy and was numbered SDK-137. SDK is a Russian abbreviation for a mid-size landing ship (Russian: средний десантный корабль, Sredniy Desantnyi Korabl, SDK).

Although officially the Soviet Union was not involved in the 1973 Yom Kippur War, SDK 137 was part of the Soviet Mediterranean squadron that was in the area along with a marine infantry detachment loaded. The vessel's enlisted starshina 1st stage P. Grinev downed one of the Israeli F-4 Phantom planes with the ship's AK-230 artillery system and was awarded for that the Order of Red Star.

=== Ukrainian service ===
As a result of the Soviet Black Sea Fleet division between Russian Black Sea Fleet and the Ukrainian Navy, in 1994 SDK 137 was passed to the Ukrainian Navy and was renamed SKD Kirovohrad. In 1996 it was commissioned and given the pennant number U-401 Kirovohrad.

In 1998–2002 Kirovohrad was repaired at the Metallist Ship Repair Factory in Balaklava and once again in 2012–2013 at the Black Sea Shipyard in Mykolaiv.

At the start of the 2014 Russian military intervention in Ukraine, on 21 March 2014 Kirovohrad was surrendered to unmarked Russian naval personnel at Lake Donuzlav along with the minesweeper Chernihiv. On 19 April 2014 the Russian military returned the ship along with the Ukrainian corvette Vinnytsia.

In 2016 it was renamed again to U-401 Yuri Olefirenko in a memory of a Ukrainian marine who perished during the War in Donbas.

In April 2022 the ship was claimed by Russian media to have again been captured by Russia at the port of Berdyansk and that she may have been moved to Novorossiysk. However, on 3 June 2022 Yuri Olefirenko was spotted in Ukrainian control near Ochakiv, Ukraine under fire by Russian artillery. The ship is believed to have survived the strikes and that it had not been captured at Berdyansk as previously claimed by Russian media.

Russia’s Defense Ministry said on 31 May 2023 that the ship had been destroyed two days prior. Russian Defense Ministry spokesman Igor Konashenkov claimed that the ship had been hit with "high-precision weapons" - a term he often uses to describe missiles. The Ukrainian Navy told reporters that they refuse to comment on any Russian claims and that they generally do not talk about any such losses in public.

Frederick Mertens and Paul van Hooft of The Hague Centre for Strategic Studies told Newsweek that while it is possible that the ship was directly struck by an anti-ship missile without sinking, the loss of the Yuri Olefirenko would have "almost no impact" in Ukrainian naval capabilities, which largely relies on fast attack craft instead, and the aging vessel is of little use in an amphibious assault on the annexed Crimean coast. The 2025 issue of the Military Balance by the International Institute for Strategic Studies does not list the Yuri Olefirenko in the Ukrainian Navy inventories.

== Gallery ==
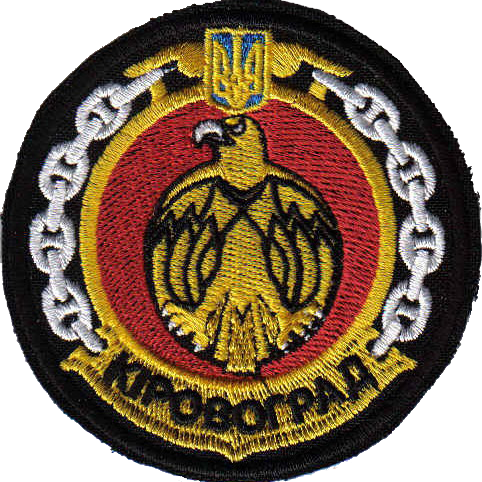
Former badge of Kirovohrad

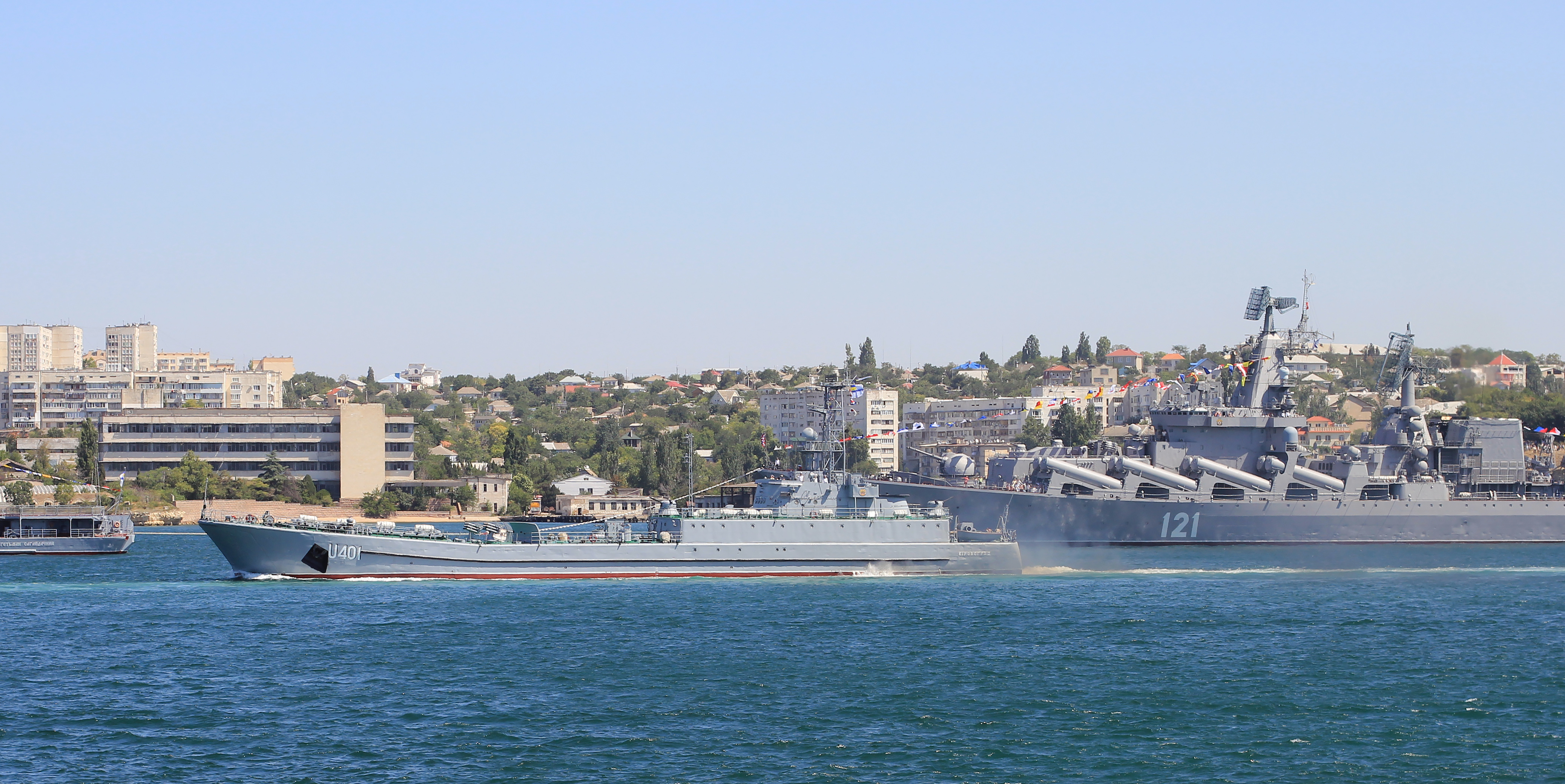
Kirovohrad in Sevastopol Bay in 2012.

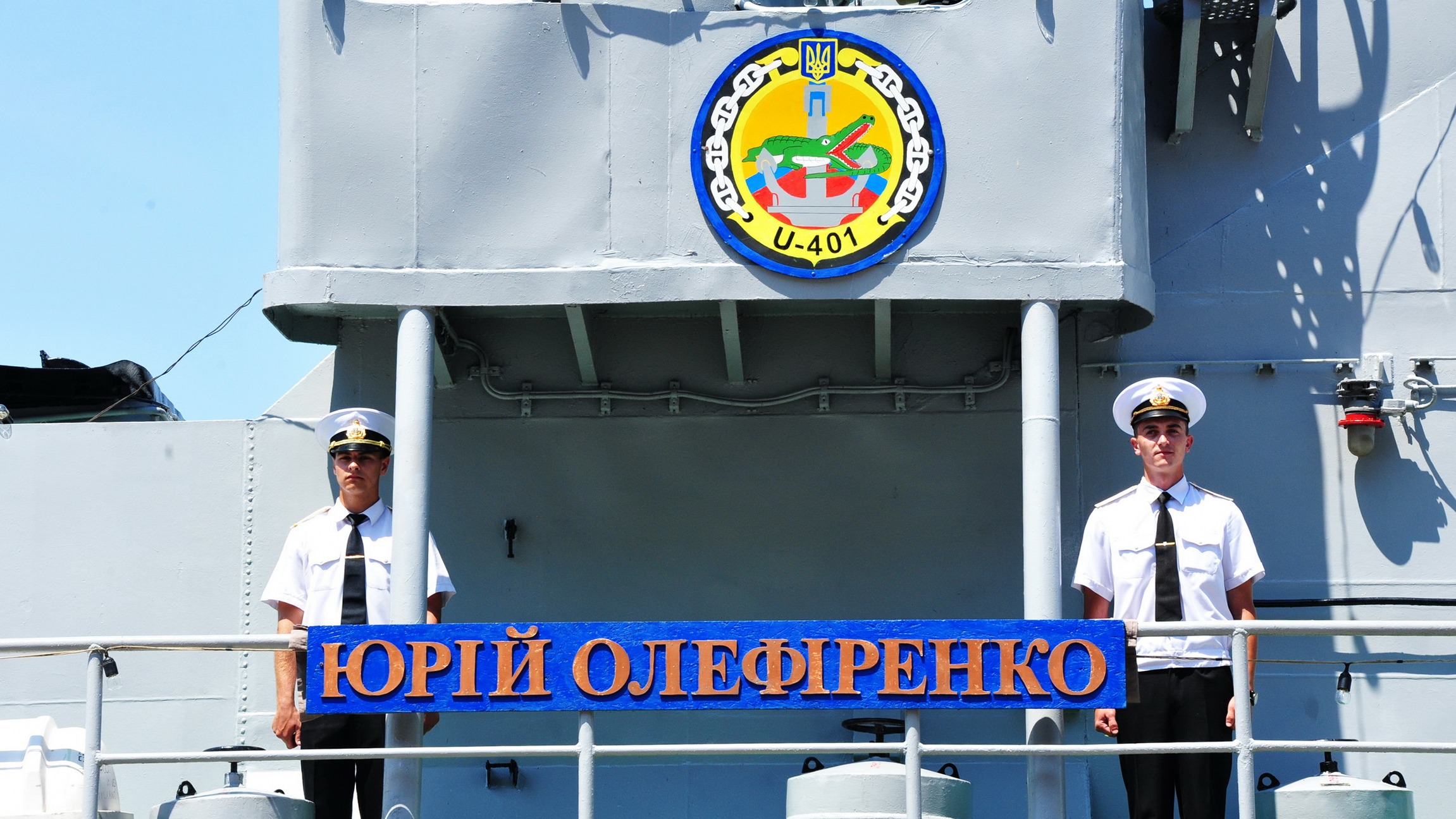
Renaming of the ship in 2016

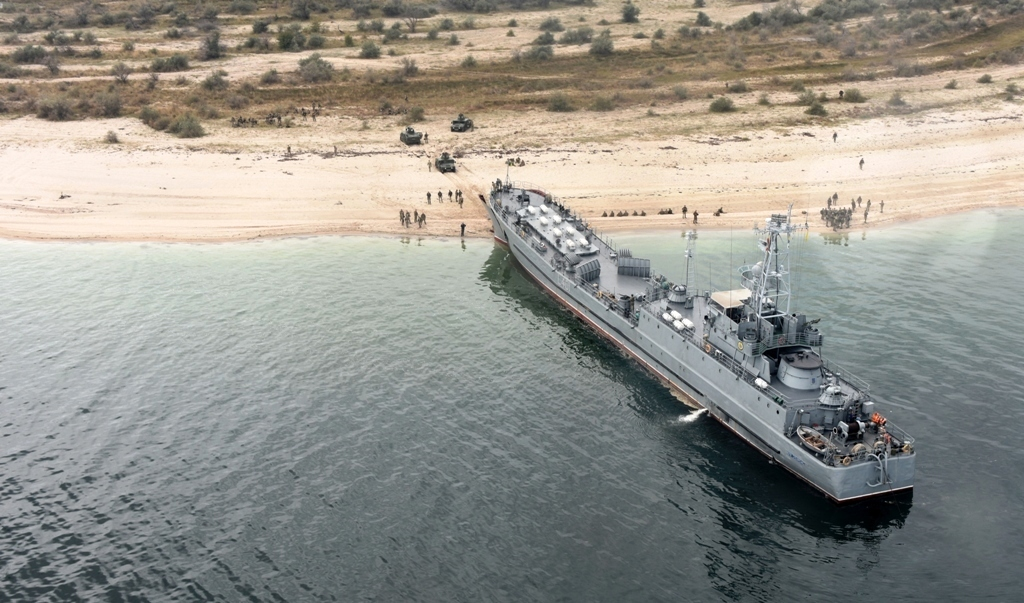
2018 training exercise

== See also ==
- List of active Ukrainian Navy ships
