= Special Operations Center "South" (Ukraine) =

Special Operations Center "South" 73rd Naval Special Operations Regiment 7th Naval Special Operations Brigade (1992–2004)
- 73-й морський центр спеціальних операцій імені кошового отамана Антона Головатого
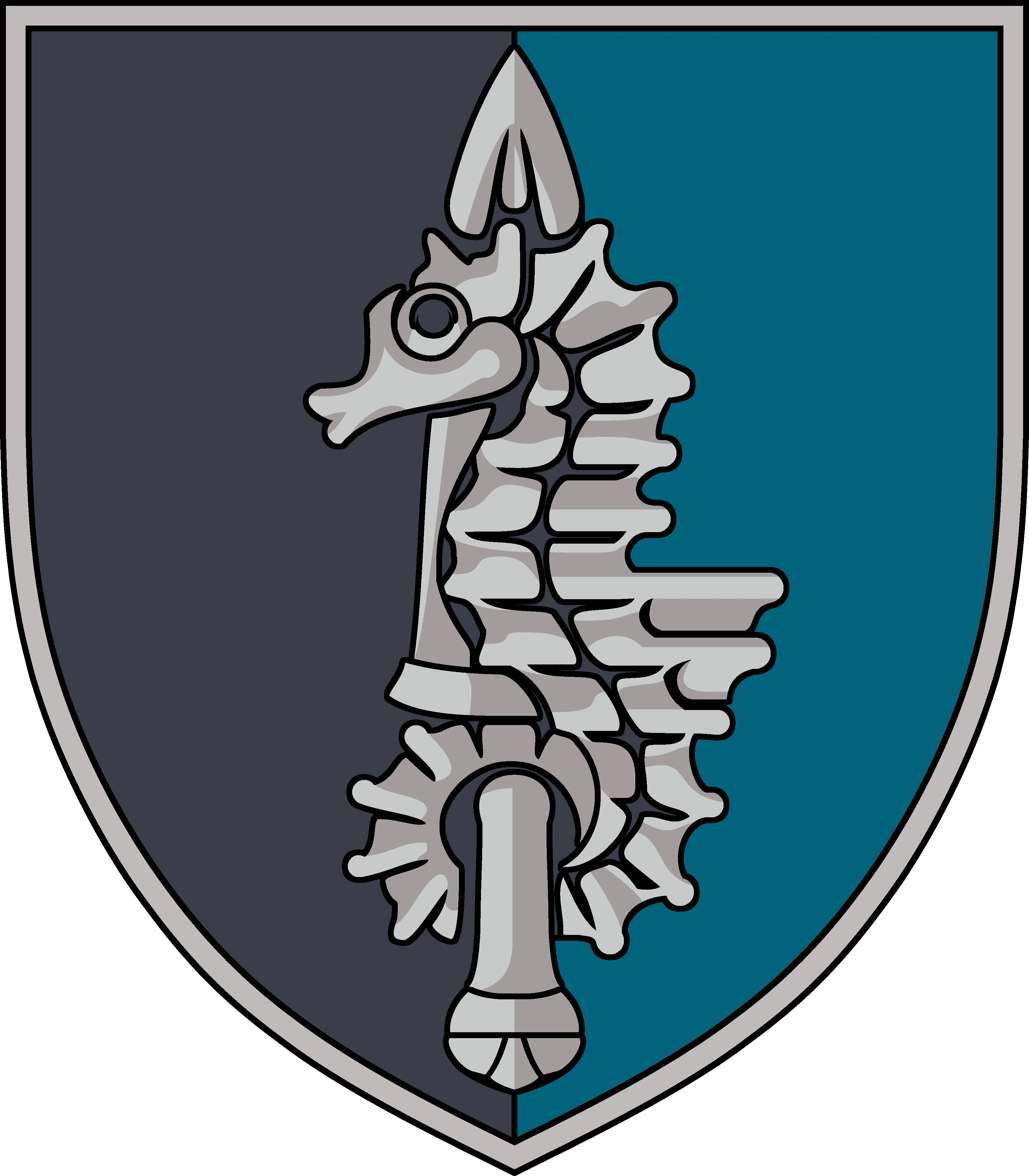
- Regimental insignia
- Founded: 1992
- Country: Ukraine
- Allegiance: Armed Forces of Ukraine
- Branch: Ukrainian Navy (1992–2016); Special Operations Forces (2016–present)
- Type: Special forces and frogmen
- Garrison/HQ: Ochakiv, Ukraine
- Nickname: "Chieftain Antin Holovaty Regiment"
- Mascot: Seahorse
- Engagements: Russo–Ukrainian War; War in Donbas; Russian invasion of Ukraine
- Decorations: Courage and Bravery

Commanders
- Current commander: Oleksii Prykhodko

Insignia
- Former insignia

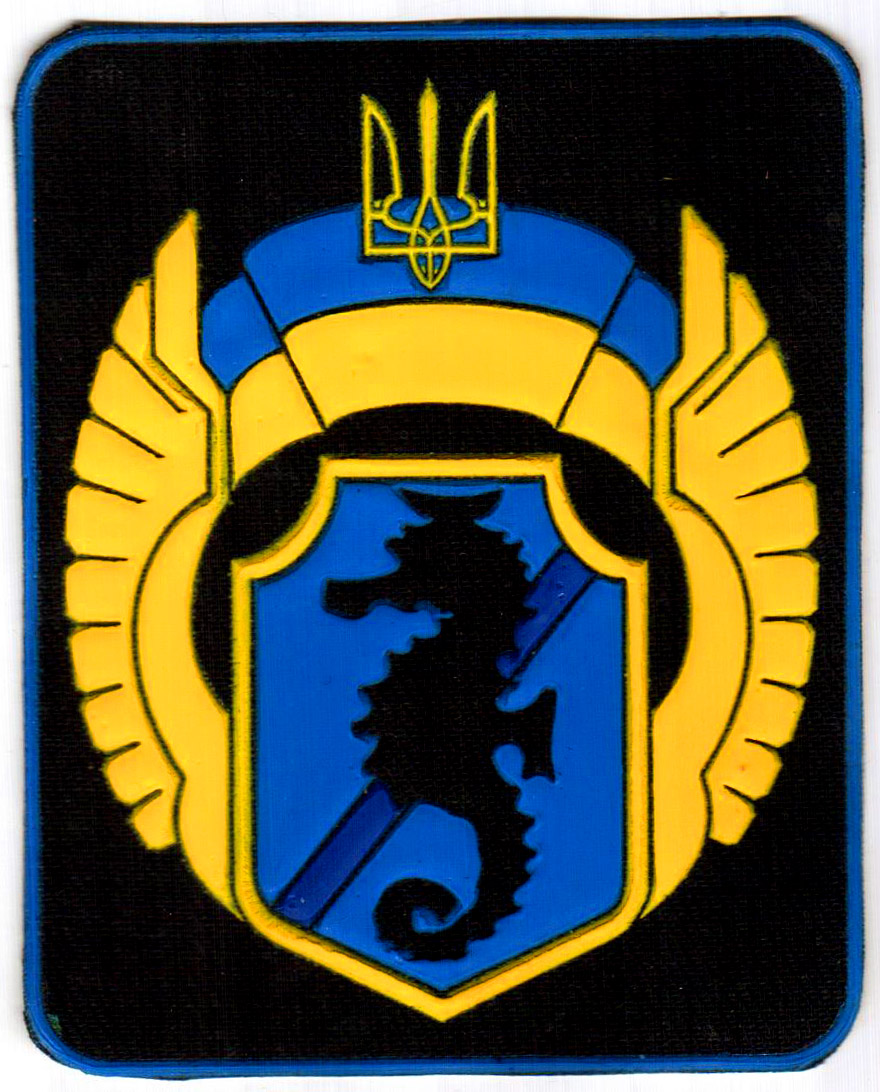
- Shoulder sleeve insignia

The Special Operations Center "South" (formerly the 73rd Naval Special Operations Center "Chieftain Antin Holovaty") (MUN А3199) is the naval special forces component of the Ukrainian Special Operations Forces (SSO) that specialized in amphibious reconnaissance to prepare for amphibious warfare operations, clandestine operation, defense against swimmer incursions, direct action against important strategic or tactical goals, irregular warfare, maritime counterterrorism and hostage rescue, naval special warfare, and underwater demolition. It joined the Ukrainian Navy on 1992 and became a part of SSO in 2016, becoming the sole Ukrainian Navy component of SSO. It is headquartered at Ochakiv.

== History ==
=== Establishment and early history ===
The brigade began operations as the 17th Separate Special Purpose Brigade of the Soviet Navy, being reformed into the 1464th Naval Reconnaissance Battalion before the Dissolution of Soviet Union, after which on 9 April 1992, two thirds of officers and all other personnel of the battalion under Commander Anatoly Leonidovich Karpenko swore allegiance to Ukraine, and the Battalion became 7th Separate Special Operations Brigade of the Ukrainian Navy.

From August to September 1992, the 7th Naval Special Operations Brigade along with Alpha Group took part in the Operation Shield of Ukraine to ensure the safe delivery of "hryvnia" from Canada to Ukraine on the ship "Petr Aleynikov".

Rumors began to arise about an alleged attempt by Ukraine to seize the Black Sea Fleet headquarters and other Russia facilities in Sevastopol by using the forces of the 7th Naval Special Operations Brigade. The source of these rumors was a novel Confrontation by the editor of the special operations department of the Russian illustrated magazine Soldier of Fortune, Serhiy Kozlov. The incident alleged to be a takeover attempt was actually a covert reconnaissance operation.

The brigade took part in multiple non-combat operations including the handling of a major spillway accident in Kharkiv, abandoned ordinance removal near Odessa and Kherson, removal of World War I era naval mines from the Danube near Izmail and several landmines in the South of Ukraine. Ukrainian patrol boat Skadovsk which was then under the command of the brigade destroyed a sea mine, which was found floating near city of Izmail in 1993 and in 1996 the vessel was also used to destroy an aerial bomb near a pier in Kherson. In 1995, the Ukrainian ship Pereyaslav was subordinated to the brigade.

In 2004, it was transferred from Kozachyi Island to Ochakiv Garrison, becoming the 73rd Naval Special Operations Regiment with the following designated purposes.

- Amphibious reconnaissance to prepare for amphibious warfare operations
- Clandestine operation
- Commando style raids
- Defense against swimmer incursions
- Demining naval mines
- Irregular warfare
- Long-range penetration
- Maritime counterterrorism and hostage rescue crisis management
- Maritime sabotage
- Special reconnaissance
- Underwater demolition
- VBSS operations

=== Russo-Ukrainian War ===
War in Donbas

The regiment took part in multiple combat operations during the war in Donbas.

The regiment took part in the Battle of Ilovaisk in 2014. During the battle, the regiment also took part in the capture of the village of Grabske during which a soldier of the regiment (Dmytro Volodymyrovych Krasov) was killed on August 13. In the main battle, thirty personnel of the regiment took part, two personnel (Zagranichnyi Valentin Anatoliyovych and Volodymyr Mykolayovych Kostyuk) were killed and three were captured, 25 personnel were able to lift the encirclement and were able to safely evacuate but amongst them six were wounded. Zagranichnyi was killed on August 29 while on a reconnaissance mission near the village of Mnogopillya while Volodymyr Mykolayovych Kostyuk was killed on August 31 in an ambush while in a convoy travelling along the "humanitarian corridor" along with twenty five other soldiers of the regiment when it was ambushed near a sunflower field.

The regiment took part in the Battle for Starobesheve during which a soldiers of the regiment (Kornafel Evgeny Vadimovych) and the regiment commander Oleksiy Volodymyrovych Zinchenko were killed as a result of artillery strikes on August 17, 2014.

In September 2014, the regiment under commander Olefirenko Yury Borisovych, conducted reconnaissance and provide information about the separatist mortar positions during the battle for Pavlopil. This helped the Ukrainian artillery units to strike the separatist units with ease and led to a successful recapture of the village.

On January 16, 2015, during the battle and bombardment near the villages of Hranitne and Mykolaivka, the regiment commander Olefirenko Yury Borisovych was killed by artillery fire but was able to safely evacuate three soldiers before succumbing to his injuries.

The regiment took part in the Battle of Debaltseve. In late January and early February 2015, the regiment conducted reconnaissance near the Vuhlehirska Power Station and also blew up the dam near Svitlodarsk and some bridges in the surrounding area to stop enemy reinforcements. On February 6, the regiment was involved in the capture of the village Ridkodub to lift the siege of trapped Ukrainian units with the regiment clearing the village and reinforcing the parameters, in total rescuing 102 personnel. From February 14, units of the regiment and 8th Special Operations Regiment guarded the section of the Debaltseve-Artemivsk highway in the Luhansk Oblast for the safe withdrawal of Ukrainian troops.

In June 2015, the regiment took part in the Battle for Chermalyk, the most significant engagement occurred on June 2 when the regiment personnel attacked the separatist positions with the task of destroying the self propelled artillery of the separatists attacking the village, the task was successfully completed. During the battle a soldier of regiment (Goryainov Mykhailo Gennadiyovych) was killed and another was wounded meanwhile 10-12 separatists were also killed in the engagement.

On December 15, 2015, at 10:15 a.m, the ship "Pereyaslav" approached the Russian self-elevating floating drilling rig "Tavrida" and asked it to explain the purpose of its presence to which it showed no response.

The unit became a part of the Ukraine Special Operations Forces with its establishment in January 2016.

On March 4, 2016, during a routine reconnaissance mission, the patrol squad of the regiment was operating in an area of Dokuchaievsk, suddenly encountering a sabotage and reconnaissance group of the separatists. During the engagement combat two soldiers of the regiment (Yurii Volodymyrovych Gorayskyi and Oleksandr Anatoliyovych Khmelyarov) were killed. Then the main force of the 73rd regiment arrived, later reinforced with the units from the 72nd Mechanized Brigade. In the ensuing battle, thirty separatists were killed.

The regiment took part in combat operations in the city of Marinka and in one such operation, the deputy commander of the regiment (Oleg Kostyantynovich Medynskyi) was killed as a result of a landmine explosion on September 14, 2016.

In August 2018, the regiment took part in the "Storm-2018" military exercises aimed at strengthening the Ukrainian defenses against any probable Russian aggression.

In August 2019, the Pereyaslav transported the 503rd Separate Marine Infantry Battalion to the port of Poti in Georgia for exercise "Agile Spirit". After leaving Ukrainian waters it was followed by a Russian warship"Kasimov" and while returning two Russian ships"Zheleznyakov" and "Naberezhnye Chelny" tailed it back to Ukrainian waters.

In November 2019, the Ukrainian gunboat "Nikopol" which had been captured by Russia during the Kerch Strait incident was returned to Ukraine and the regiment's ship Pereyaslav escorted it to Ochakiv along with two Willard-type speedboats.

In 2019, the regiment base was again transferred to Kozachyi Island, the old infrastructure was restored and improved for reserve meetings, military exercises, swimming and reconnaissance competitions amongst others.

On December 6, 2019, the regiment was awarded the honorary name of "Chieftain Antin Holovaty".

Russian invasion of Ukraine

The regiment has seen significant combat operations during the Russian invasion of Ukraine taking part in many battles.

In February 2022, the regiment along with the Territorial Defense Forces and the Ukrainian police successfully defended the Kulbakino Air Base inflicting heavy losses on the invading Russian Forces.

The vessel of the regiment Netishyn, laid naval mines from February 24 to May 23, 2022, in the Black Sea off the coast of Ukraine performing combat operations in close proximity to Russian warships amidst aerial raids conducted by the Russian Air Force.

The regiment reconnaissance ship Pereyaslav was hit by gunfire as a result of a Russian special forces operation in the mouth of the Dnieper on 30 March 2022.

The regiment participated in the Snake Island Campaign and on July 7, 2022, with the help of specialized equipment, they performed a reconnaissance operation at the coast of Island for detecting naval mines. After landing the regiment surveyed the area, collected data on the Russian equipment, weapons and material, and brought captured equipment from Zmiinyi. The regiment installed Ukrainian flags on different parts of the island as well as the flag of the 73rd regiment. On August 24, 2022, the president of Ukraine, Volodymyr Zelenskyy, awarded the regiment with the honorary award "For Courage and Bravery (Ukraine)" for its actions in the Snake Island campaign.

The regiment took part in the Defense of Mariupol, destroying six pieces of Russian equipment and killing around fifty Russian personnel. Then the unit under the command of Mykola Arturovych began to evacuate but a BM-21 Grad hit the vehicle of the detachment commander Mykola Arturovych Nikonov killing him.

The regiment took part in combat operations in the village of Velike Artakove where during the engagement, a flamethrower operator (Gorkovoy Roman Artemovich) was killed.

The regiment carried out operations in the village of Bila Krynytsia and on July 18, 2022, a soldier of the unit (Dymyd Artemiy Mykhailovych) was killed in action.

The regiment was involved in combat and patrol operations in Kherson Oblast in 2023 and in one such mission a soldier of the regiment (Dmytro Dmytrovych Pashchuk) was killed by a Kamikaze drone on March 12, 2023.

In June 2023, during the 2023 Ukrainian counteroffensive, a video captured by a helmet-mounted GoPro of a Ukrainian soldier from the regiment went viral on social media. In the video, a small group of Ukrainian soldiers enters a Russian trench, with the soldier filming killing four poorly trained Russian soldiers at nearly point-blank range. Two Ukrainian soldiers fire their AR-15 style rifles around a corner where they believed a Russian soldier to be. The Russian soldier appears to be unarmed and charged from out his corner before he was riddled with bullets and finished off. The soldiers turn around and fire at two other unarmed Russian soldiers who appeared out of a corner. The first one is shot multiple times and dies instantly. The other Russian soldier is shot and falls, screaming in agony and is promptly killed by a double tap to the head. The video then cuts to a portion where the Ukrainians are throwing grenades at a target outside of the trench. A bright flash appears on video, from an enemy grenade and the soldier recording is separated from his comrade and is forced to hide in a small corridor. A Russian soldier armed with an AK-74 appears and is instantly shot dead with two short automatic bursts by the soldier recording.

The regiment took part in an incursion across the Dnieper and the capture of the village of Krynky, during which a soldier of the regiment (Pazina Viktor Ihorovych) was killed on December 8, 2023.

On February 28, 2024, a group of soldiers of the regiment died while attempting a raids on the Tendra Spit in Kherson Oblast but the landing was unsuccessful with nine confirmed deaths and one captured leading seaman.

The vessel of the regiment Netishyn was involved in the search for dead personnel from the Island-type patrol boat P190 "Slovyansk" and the trawler U360 "Henichesk", sunk by Russian aircraft. They retrieved dead bodies as well as artillery and communications equipment from the destroyed ships.

== Structure ==
As it is the only naval unit of the Ukrainian Special Operations Forces so it handles all the naval tasks of the SSO including operations in support of the Navy and the Marine Corps, as well as naval assets and personnel of the Unmanned Systems Forces. The regiment consists of the following units:

Infantry units:

- 1st Underwater Mining and Special Purpose Squad
- 2nd Underwater Demining and Amphibious Assault Squad
- 3rd Reconnaissance and Special Operations Squad
- Rear Support Units

Naval vessels:

- Pereyaslav (Reconnaissance Ship) (Note: Shared with 29th Division)
- Skadovsk (Patrol boat) (Note: Now transferred)
- Netishyn (Diving support vessel) (Note: Shared with 8th Division)
- Svatov (Amphibious warfare ship) (Note: Shared with 29th Division)

== Equipment ==
The regiment is equipped with Triton-2M and Sirena-UM and usual operates SPP-1 underwater pistols, APS underwater rifles and underwater mines. The Tornado F50 Long hovercraft is also in service with the regiment.

| Type | Image | Production | Purpose | Quantity | Notes |
Small Arms
| APB | | Soviet Union | Suppressed Machine Pistol | | |
| AK-TK AK-74 | | Ukraine; Soviet Union | Assault rifle | | |
| PK | | Soviet Union/Ukraine | Machine gun | | |
| SPP-1 underwater pistol | | USSR | Underwater pistol | | |
| APS underwater rifle | | USSR | Underwater Assault Rifle | | |
Vehicles
| Triton-2M | | Soviet Union/Ukraine | Underwater Vehicle | | |
| Sirena-UM | | Soviet Union/Ukraine | Underwater Vehicle | | |

== Mascot ==
The mascot of the regiment is a seahorse with the sword of Svyatoslav the Brave with a shield of two colors, blue-green and black. The seahorse symbolizes marine operations, stealth and adaptability to the aquatic environment. The sword of Svyatoslav the Brave symbolizes devotion to military, courage, bravery and resolve.

== Commanders ==
- Captain 1st rank Anatolii Karpenko (1988–1998)
- Captain 1st rank Serhii Yershov (1998–2004)
- Captain 1st rank Oleksandr Pozdniakov (2004–2009)
- Captain 1st rank Oleksii Stankevych (2009–2010)
- Captain 2nd rank Ihor Tatarchenko (2011–2012)
- Captain 1st rank Oleksii Zinchenko (2012–2014)
- Captain 1st rank Yurii Olefirenko † (2014–2015)
- Captain 1st rank Ihor Vechirko † (2015)
- Captain 1st rank Eduard Shevchenko (2016–2017)
- Captain 1st rank Yurii Sydorenko (2017–2020)
- Captain 1st rank Serhii Sundukov (2020–2024)
- Captain 2nd rank Danylo Keller (2020–2024)
- Captain 1st rank Oleksii Prykhodko (04.2024-)

== Sources and references ==
- The historical form of the part. Ministry of Defense of the USSR. Military unit 34391.
- K. V. Chuprin. The armed forces of the CIS and Baltic states. Reference book. Minsk: Sovremennaya shkola, 2009. ISBN 978-985-513-617-1
- Алексей Коршунов. 17 ОБрСпН КЧФ. Краткий исторический очерк
- 73 Морський центр спеціальних операцій на Українському мілітарному порталі
- Віктор Слезко. Єдиний підрозділ бойових плавців ВМФ України «списали на берег». «Дзеркало тижня» No. 21, 29 May 2004
- «Морські котики» — проект допомоги десантникам 73-го Морського центру спеціального призначення.
- У ВОДІ, НА НЕБІ, НА ЗЕМЛІ!
