= List of naval battles =

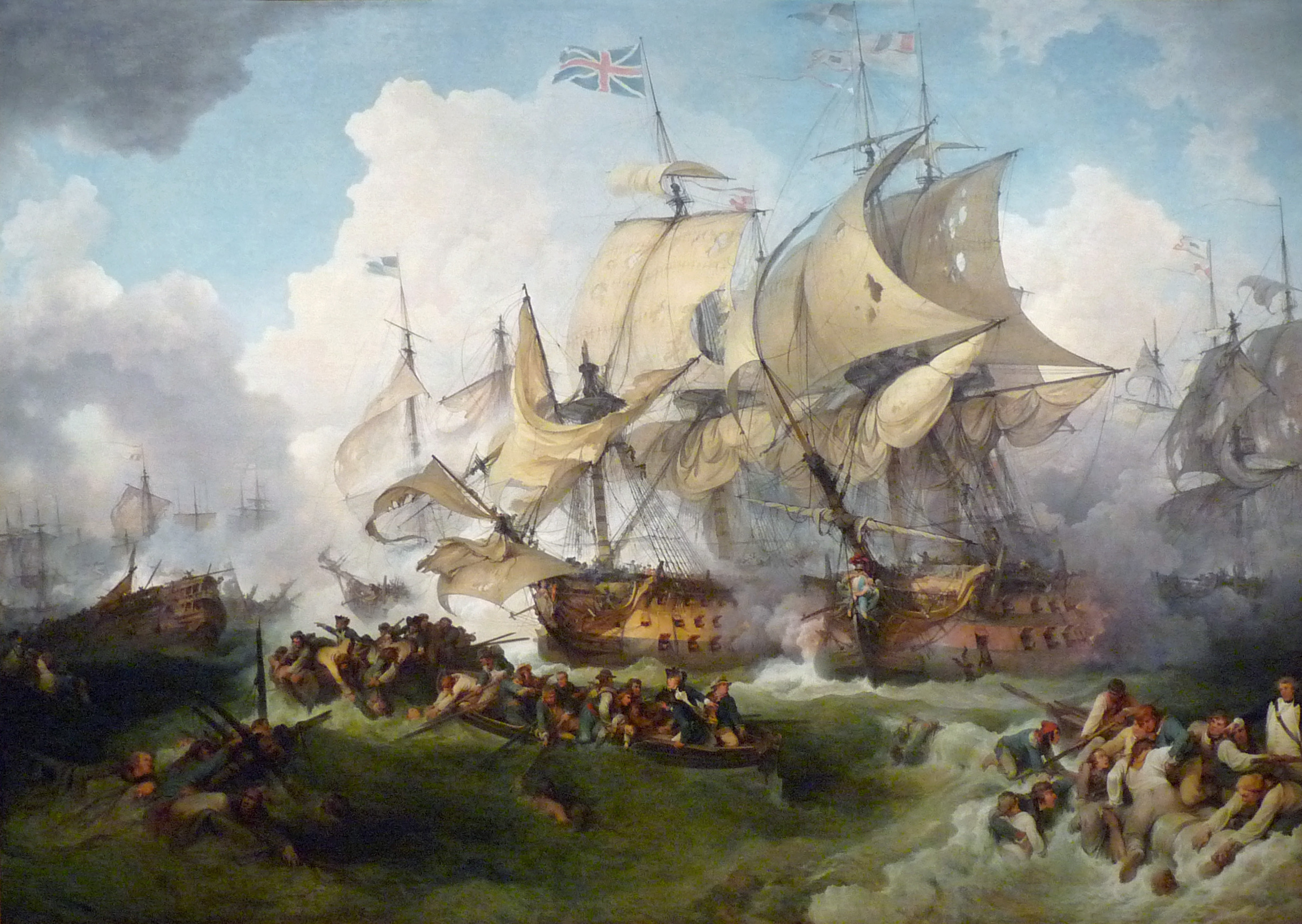
Lord Howe's action, or the Glorious First of June, a 1795 painting by Philip James de Loutherbourg depicting the Glorious First of June, a naval battle between the British and the French. This battle occurred in 1794, during the height of the Age of Sail.

This list of naval battles is a chronological list delineating important naval battles that have occurred throughout history, from the beginning of naval warfare with the Ancient Egypt in the 13th century BC to piracy off the coast of Somalia in the 21st century. If a battle has no commonly used name it is referred to as "Action of (date)" within the list below.

== Ancient ==
Year	Battle	Loc.	Winners	Losers	Notes
c. 1278 BC	Sherden raid on Egypt's coast	(Egypt)	Egypt under Ramesses II	Sherden	Ramesses II defeated Sherden pirates when they attempted to raid Egypt's coast.
1275–1205 BC	Battles of Alashiya	(Cyprus)	Hittite navy	Alashiya	3 engagements
c. 1190 BC	Battle of the Delta	(Egypt)	Egypt under Ramesses III	The "Sea Peoples"	Ramesses III defeat the sea people In the Nile Delta.
664 BC			Corinth battles Corfu		
570 BC	Egypt invasion of Cyprus	(Cyprus)	Ancient Egypt	Cyprus	Perhaps employing the fleet of his friend Polycrates, pharaoh Amasis II reputedly subdued Cyprus
540–535 BC	Battle of Alalia	(France)	Carthaginians and Etruscans	Greeks	Near Alalia (now Aléria), Corsica
497 BC		(Cyprus)	Ionians	Phoenicians	Near Cyprus
494 BC	Battle of Lade	(Turkey)	Persians	Ionians	
480 BC	Battle of Artemisium	(Greece)	Stalemate between Persians and Greeks		
480 BC	Battle of Salamis	(Greece)	The allied Greek navy	Persians	
474 BC	Battle of Cumae	(Italy)	Syracuse and Cumae	Etruscans	
460s BC	Battle of the Eurymedon	(Turkey)	Delian League	Persians	
458 BC	Battle of Aegina	(Greece)	Athenians	Aegina and the Peloponnesians	
450s BC	Salamis-in-Cyprus	(Cyprus)	Delian League	Phoenicians and Cilicians	
433 BC	Battle of Sybota	(Greece)	Corcyra and Athens	Corinthians	
429 BC	Battles of Naupactus	(Greece)	Athenians	Spartans and Corinthians	
425 BC	Battle of Pylos	(Greece)	Athenians	Spartans	
413 BC	Siege of Syracuse	(Italy)	Syracusans	Athenians	
411 BC	Battle of Cynossema	(Turkey)	Athenians	Spartans	
411 BC	Battle of Eretria	(Greece)	Spartans	Athenians	In Sep
410 BC	Battle of Cyzicus	(Turkey)	Athenians	Spartans and Peloponnesians	
406 BC	Battle of Arginusae	(Turkey)	Athenians	Peloponnesians	
405 BC	Battle of Notium	(Turkey)	Spartans under Lysander	Athenians under Antiochus	AKA the Battle of Ephesus
405 BC	Battle of Aegospotami	(Turkey)	Spartans	Athens	Athenian navy destroyed
394 BC	Battle of Cnidus	(Turkey)	Persians	Spartans	
384–3 BC	Battle of Pharos	(Croatia)	Syracusans	Liburnians	
376 BC	Battle of Naxos	(Greece)	Athenians	Spartans	
357 BC		(Greece)	Chios	Athenians	During the Social War
322 BC	Battle of Amorgos	(Greece)	Macedonians	Athenians	
306 BC	Battle of Salamis in Cyprus	(Cyprus)	Demetrius I Poliorcetes	Menelaeus, brother of Ptolemy I of Egypt	
276 BC	Battle of the Strait of Messina	(Italy)	Carthaginians	Pyrrhus of Epirus	
261 BC	Battle of Cos	(Greece)	Antigonus II Gonatas	Ptolemy II	
260 BC	Battle of the Lipara Islands	(Italy)	Carthaginians	Roman Republic	
260 BC	Battle of Mylae	(Italy)	Romans under Duilius	Carthaginians	Near Sicily
258 BC	Battle of Ephesus	(Greece)	Rhodians under Agathostratus	Ptolemaic fleet under Chremonides	
258 BC	Battle of Sulci	(Italy)	Romans under Gaius Sulpicius Paterculus	Carthaginians under Hannibal Gisco	
257 BC	Battle of Tyndaris	(Italy)	Romans under Gaius Atilius Regulus	Carthaginians under Hamilcar	
256 BC	Battle of Cape Ecnomus	(Italy)	Romans	Carthaginians under Hamilcar	
249 BC	Battle of Drepana	(Italy)	Carthaginians	Romans	
246–245 BC	Battle of Andros	(Greece)	Macedonians	Egyptians	At Andros
241 BC	Battle of the Aegates Islands	(Italy)	Romans	Carthaginians	10 March; ending the First Punic War
229 BC	Battle of Paxos	(Greece)	Illyrians	Corcyraeans	Illyrians conquer island of Corcyra
218 BC	Battle of Lilybaeum	(Italy)	Romans under Amellius	Carthaginians	Near Lilybaeum, Sicily
217 BC	Battle of Ebro River	(Spain)	Romans under Cornelius Scipio	Carthaginians	Near the mouth of the Ebro River, Spain
206 BC	Battle of Carteia	(Spain)	Romans under Gaius Laelius	Carthaginians under Adherbal	
201 BC	Battle of Chios	(Greece)	Egyptians, Rhodians, and Pergamese	Philip V of Macedon	
201 BC	Second Battle of Lade	(Turkey)	Philip V of Macedon	Rhodians under Cleonaeus	
190 BC	Battle of the Eurymedon	(Turkey)	Roman forces under Lucius Aemilius Regillus	Seleucid fleet commanded by Hannibal	
190 BC	Battle of Myonessus	(Turkey)	Romans under Regillus and Rhodians under Eudoras	Seleucids under Polyxenidas	
147 BC	Battle of the Port of Carthage	(Tunisia)	Carthaginians under Hasdrubal	Roman fleet of Lucius Hostilius Mancinus	
74 BC	Battle of Chalcedon	(Turkey)	Pontians under Mithridates VI	Roman fleet of Marcus Aurelius Cotta	
73 BC	Battle of Tenedos	(Greece)	Romans under Lucullus	Pontian fleet	
67 BC	Battle of Korakesion	(Turkey)	Romans under Pompey	Cilician pirates	
56 BC	Battle of Morbihan	(France)	Romans under Decius Brutus	Veneti	Near Armorica
49 BC	Battle of Île du Levant	(France)	Romans under Decius Brutus	?	At Île du Levant
49 BC		(France)	Romans under Decius Brutus	?	At Tauroentum
42 BC			Republican fleet	Reinforcements of the triumvirs led by Gnaeus Domitius Calvinus	Intercepted and destroyed
36 BC	Battle of Naulochus	(Italy)	Agrippa	Sextus Pompeius	3 Sep
31 BC	Battle of Actium	(Greece)	Octavian	Antony and Cleopatra	2 Sep; decisive victory
AD 70			Rome vs Batavi in the Maas		
AD 199	Battle of Shaxian	(China)	Wu forces under Sun Ce	Liu Biao and Huang Zu	
AD 208	Battle of Red Cliffs	(China)	Combined forces of Liu Bei and Sun Quan	Fleet under Cao Cao	
AD 221	Battle of Yiling	(China)	Sun Quan	Fleet under Liu Bei	And successfully defends Jingzhou
AD 222	Battle of Dongkou	(China)	Eastern Wu general Lü Fan	Cao Xiu	
AD 272	Battle of Xiling	(China)	Lu Kang	Jin general Bu Chan	And retakes Xiling

== Middle Ages ==
Century	Year	Battle	Loc.	Winners	Losers	Notes
5th century	456	Battle of Corsica	(Italy)	Western Roman Empire under Flavius Ricimer	Vandals	Near Corsica
5th century	461	Battle of Cartagena	(Spain)	Vandals	Western Roman Empire	Vandals destroy a newly built West Roman fleet
5th century	468	Battle of Cape Bon	(Tunisia)	Vandals	East and West Romans under Basiliscus	
6th century	551	Battle of Sena Gallica	(Italy)	Byzantines	Ostrogoths	
7th century	649	Muslim conquest of Cyprus	(Cyprus)	Arabs	Byzantines	
7th century	655	Battle of the Masts	(Turkey)	Arabs under Uthman	Byzantines under Constans II	
7th century	663	Battle of Baekgang	(South Korea)	Tang China and Silla	Yamato Japan and Baekje	Aug
7th century	676	Battle of Gibeolpo	(South Korea)	Silla	Tang China	
7th century	677 or 678	First Arab siege of Constantinople	(Turkey)	Byzantines	Arabs	First use of "Greek fire"
7th century	697?			Greeks under John the Patrician	Arabs	
7th century	698	Battle of Carthage	(Tunisia)	Arabs	Greeks under John the Patrician	
	698		Imperial Constantinopolitan fleet	Cibyrrhaeot rebels		
8th century	717	Second Arab siege of Constantinople	(Turkey)	Byzantines under Leo III the Isaurian	Arabs	3 Sep 717—Spring 1718
8th century	719		(United Kingdom)	Opposing groups of curraghs		Dalriadan civil war resulted in a conflict mentioned in the Senchus Fer n-Alban
8th century	727			Byzantine central imperial fleet under Agallianos Kontoskeles	Provincial Helladic and Cyclades fleets	
8th century	746	Battle of Keramaia	(Cyprus)	Cibyrrhaeots	Umayyad Caliphate	Arabs based in Egypt
9th century	806?		(Italy)	Moors under Hadumar	Franks	Near Corsica
9th century	807		(Italy)	Franks under Burchard (a lieutenant of Charlemagne)	Moors	At Sardinia
9th century	813			Byzantines	Arabs	
9th century	813		(Spain)	Franks under Irmingar	Moors	Near Majorca
9th century	820		(Italy)	Arabs	Franks	Near Sardinia
9th century	822	Siege of Constantinople	(Greece)	Byzantine central imperial fleet	Rebel provincial fleets	In Constantinople during the revolt of Thomas the Slav
9th century	829	Battle of Thasos	(Greece)	Cretan Saracens	Byzantines	
9th century	841		(Italy)	Arabs	Venetian squadron	Near Taranto
9th century	849	Battle of Ostia	(Italy)	Italian city-states	Muslims	Off southern Italy
9th century	851	Battle of Sandwich	(England)	Kentishmen under Æthelstan	Viking fleet	Near Kent
9th century	c. 872/3	Battle of Kardia	(Turkey)	Byzantine admiral Niketas Ooryphas	Cretan Saracens under the renegade Photios	
9th century	c. 873/9	Battle of the Gulf of Corinth	(Greece)	Byzantine admiral Niketas Ooryphas	Cretan Saracens under the renegade Photios	Photios is killed
9th century	880	Battle of Cephalonia	(Greece)	Byzantines under Nasar	Aghlabids	
9th century	880	Battle of Stelai	(Italy)	Byzantines under Nasar	Aghlabids	AKA Punto Stilo or Milazzo
9th century	885			Frisians	Vikings	
9th century	888	Battle of Milazzo	(Italy)	Aghlabids	Byzantines	
10th century	906			Byzantines under Himerios	Arabs	On St. Thomas' Day (6 Oct)
10th century	912	Battle of Chios	(Greece)	Syrian-Cilician fleet	Byzantine squadron under Himerios	
10th century	932	Battle of Lang-shan Jiang	(China)	Wuyue	Yang Wu	
10th century	941	Rus'-Byzantine War	(Turkey)	Byzantine fleet under Theophanes	Kievan Rus' fleet under Igor of Kiev	Near Bosporus Strait
10th century	938	First Battle of Bach Dang River	(Vietnam)	Vietnamese	Southern Han	
10th century	956		(Italy)	Christians	Tunisians	Near Mazara
10th century	958		(Italy)	Tunis vs Christians		In Messina Strait
10th century	965	Battle of the Straits	(Italy)	Fatimid fleet	Byzantine fleet under Niketas Abalantes	At the Straits of Messina
10th century	975	Battle on the Yangtze	(China)	Song forces	Tang forces	
10th century	981	Second Battle of Bach Dang	(Vietnam)	Vietnamese	Chinese Song	
10th century	998			Venetians under Orseolo	Narentan pirates	
11th century	1000	Battle of Swold		Swedes and Danes	Norwegians	9 Sep
11th century	1004		(Italy)	Venetians under Pietro Orseolo II	Arabs	At Messina
11th century	1005		(Italy)	Pisans	Arabs	At Messina
11th century	1024	Battle of Lemnos	(Greece)	Byzantines	Rus' fleet	In the Lemnos Island
11th century	1026	Battle of the Helgeå	(Sweden)	Danes under Ulf Jarl	Swedes and Norwegians under Anund Jacob and Olaf II Haraldsson (Olaf the Stout)	In southern Sweden
11th century	1032			Byzantine-Ragusan squadron	Muslim corsair fleet	In the Adriatic Sea
11th century	1032	Battle at Iron Gate	(Estonia)	Estonians	Novgorod	According to one hypothesis, this battle, mentioned in Russian chronicles, was a naval battle, where Novgorod fleet tries to reach Tallinn Bay, but is defeated by Estonians.
11th century	1035		(Greece)	Byzantines	Arabs	1035–1036; last Arab corsair raids against the Aegean islands are repulsed
11th century	1043	Rus'-Byzantine War	(Turkey)	Byzantines	Rus' squadron	In the Bosporus Strait
11th century	1062	Battle of Niså	(Sweden)	Norwegians under Harald Hardrada	Danes	In Kattegat
11th century	1081	Battle of Dyrrhachium	(Albania)	Venetian-Byzantine fleet	Normans	Near Durazzo, Albania
11th century	1084		(Albania) / (Greece)	Normans under Robert Guiscard (20 vessels?)	Venetians or Byzantines	A series of battles off Albania/Corfu
12th century	1123	Battle of Ibelin	(Israel)	Republic of Venice	Fatimid Caliphate	Near Jaffa
12th century	1137	Battle of Bigano	(Italy)	Republic of Venice	Kingdom of Sicily	At Trani, Italy
12th century	1149	Battle of Cape Malea	(Greece)	Republic of Venice Byzantine Empire	Kingdom of Sicily	
12th century	1153	Siege of Ascalon	(Israel)	Republic of Venice	Fatimid Caliphate	Near Tel Aviv
12th century	1156		(Scotland)	Celts	Vikings	North of Scotland in January
12th century	1161	Battle of Tangdao	(China)	Song dynasty	Jin dynasty	16 Nov, during the Jin–Song wars
12th century	1161	Battle of Caishi	(China)	Song dynasty	Jin dynasty	26-27 Nov, during the Jin–Song wars
12th century	1169	Siege of Damietta	(Egypt)	Fatimid Caliphate	Kingdom of Jerusalem	27 Oct-16 Dec
12th century	1177			Republic of Venice Papal States	Republic of Genoa Republic of Pisa	
12th century	1183	Battle of Mizushima	(Japan)	Taira clan	Minamoto clan	17 Nov, off coast of Shikoku
12th century	1184	Battle of Fimreite	(Norway)	Birkebeiners	Kingdom of Norway	King Sverre Sigurdsson of Norway defeats and kills rival King Magnus Erlingsson in the Sognefjord; 15 June
12th century	1185	Battle of Yashima	(Japan)	Minamoto clan	Taira clan	22 March, off coast of Shikoku
12th century	1185	Battle of Dan-no-ura	(Japan)	Minamoto clan	Taira clan	25 April, off present-day Shimonoseki, Yamaguchi; ends Genpei War
	1185	Battle of Demetritzes	(Greece)	Byzantine Empire	Kingdom of Sicily	7 Novelber, at Demetrias (Volos), Greece
13th century	1213	Battle of Damme	(Belgium)	Kingdom of England	Kingdom of France	30-31 May, in the harbor of Damme; most of French fleet is sunk
13th century	1217	Second Battle of Dover	(England)	Kingdom of England	Kingdom of France	24 Aug, off Dover; Also known as the "Fight off Sandwich".
13th century	1241	First Battle of Meloria	(Italy)	Republic of Pisa	Republic of Genoa	3 May
13th century	1258	Battle of Acre	(Israel)	Republic of Venice	Republic of Genoa	25 June
13th century	1263	Battle of Settepozzi	(Greece)	Republic of Venice	Republic of Genoa; Byzantine Empire	Off the Peloponnese
13th century	1264	Battle of Saseno	(Albania)	Republic of Genoa	Republic of Venice	
13th century	1266	Battle of Trapani	(Italy)	Republic of Venice	Republic of Genoa	
13th century	c. 1273/1275	Battle of Demetrias	(Greece)	Byzantine Empire	Triarchy of Negroponte; Kingdom of Candia	
13th century	1278	Battle of Algeciras	(Spain)	Marinid Sultanate; Emirate of Granada	Kingdom of Castile	25 July
13th century	Before 1279		(Tunisia)	Crown of Aragon	Hafsid Dynasty	Near Tunisia
13th century	1279	Battle of Yamen	(China)	Yuan dynasty	Song dynasty	19 March
13th century	1282	Action of 11 October 1282	(Italy)	Crown of Aragon; Kingdom of Sicily	Kingdom of Naples	Near Reggio di Calabria
13th century	1282	Battle of Nicotera	(Italy)	Crown of Aragon; Kingdom of Sicily	Kingdom of Naples	14 October
13th century	1283	Battle of Malta	(Malta)	Crown of Aragon; Kingdom of Sicily	Kingdom of Naples	8 July, in Grand Harbour, Malta
13th century	1284	Battle of the Gulf of Naples	(Italy)	Crown of Aragon; Kingdom of Sicily	Kingdom of Naples	5 June; Charles of Salerno is captured
13th century	1284	Second Battle of Meloria	(Italy)	Republic of Genoa	Republic of Pisa	6 Aug, near Tuscany, Italy; Pisan fleet is utterly destroyed
13th century	1285		(Spain)	Crown of Aragon	Kingdom of France	August or mid-September, at Rosas
13th century	1285	Battle of Les Formigues	(Spain)	Crown of Aragon; Kingdom of Sicily	Kingdom of France	Likely 4 Sep, near Barcelona
13th century	1287	Battle of the Counts	(Italy)	Crown of Aragon; Kingdom of Sicily	Kingdom of Naples	23 June, near Naples
13th century	1288	Third Battle of Bach Dang	(Vietnam)	Đại Việt	Yuan Dynasty	
13th century	1294	Battle of Laiazzo	(Turkey)	Republic of Genoa	Republic of Venice	near Laiazzo
13th century	1298	Battle of Curzola	(Croatia)	Republic of Genoa	Republic of Venice	9 September
13th century	1299	Battle of Cape Orlando	(Italy)	Kingdom of Naples	Kingdom of Sicily	4 July, off northern Sicily
13th century	1300	Battle of Ponza	(Italy)	Kingdom of Naples	Kingdom of Sicily	14 June, near Naples
14th century	1304	Battle of Zierikzee	(Netherlands)	French fleet under Genoese admiral Renier Grimaldi	Flemish fleet	10-11 Aug
14th century	1319	Battle of Chios	(Greece)	Knights Hospitaller and Genoese of the Lordship of Chios	Aydinid fleet	23 July
14th century	1338	Battle of Arnemuiden	(Netherlands)	Philip VI of France	English fleet of Edward III of England	23 Sep, off the coast of Zeeland. It was the first naval battle using artillery.
14th century	1340	Battle of Sluys	(Netherlands)	Edward III of England	Franco-Genoese fleet of Philip VI of France	24 June, off the coast of Flanders; Edward III gains control of the English Channel
14th century	1342	Battle of Guernsey	(Guernsey)			
14th century	1350	Battle of L'Espagnols-sur-Mer	(England)	50 English ships under Edward III and the Black Prince	40 Castilian ships	29 Aug (Old Style)
14th century	1352	Battle of the Bosporus	(Turkey)	Tactical draw: Genoese under Paganino Doria vs Venetians, Byzantine Greeks and Aragonese		In Bosporus Strait
14th century	1353	Battle of La Loiera	(Italy)	Venetians and Aragonese	Genoese	29 Aug, near Sardinia
14th century	1354	Battle of Sapienza	(Greece)	Genoese under Paganino Doria	Venetians under Niccolò Pisani	In the southern Peloponnese
14th century	1363	Battle of Lake Poyang	(China)	Mings under Zhu Yuanzhang	Hans under Chen Youliang	30 Aug – 4 Oct
14th century	1368	Mamluk raid on Cyprus	(Cyprus)	Mamluk Sultanate	Kingdom of Cyprus	March–April
14th century	1372	Battle of La Rochelle	(France)	Castilian fleet	English fleet	22-23 June, near La Rochelle
14th century	1378	Action of 30 May 1378	(Italy)	Venetians under Vettor Pisani	Genoese	Near Cape d'Anzio
14th century	1379	Battle of Pola	(Croatia)	Genoese under Luciano Doria	Venetians under Vittore Pisani	7 May, near Pula
14th century	1380	Battle of Chioggia	(Italy)	Venetians under Andrea Contarini	Genoese	June
1387	Battle of Margate	(England) / (Netherlands)	English fleet under Richard, Earl of Arundel	Franco-Castilian-Flemish wine fleet under Sir Jean de Bucq	24-25 March	
15th century	1403	Battle of Modon	(Greece)	Venetians under Carlo Zeno	Genoese fleet under the French Marshal Boucicaut	7 Oct
15th century	1416	Battle of Gallipoli	(Turkey)	Venetians	Ottoman Turks	29 May
15th century	1416	Battle of Harfleur	(France)	English	French	15 Aug (OS?), near Harfleur
15th century	1417			English under the Earl of Huntingdon	French and Genoese	29 June
15th century	1419	Battle of La Rochelle	(France)	Castilians	Flemish-Hanseatic fleet	At La Rochelle
15th century	1427	Battle of Wieringen	(Netherlands)	Burgundian fleet	Fleet of Jacqueline of Bavaria	Sep
15th century	1427	Battle of the Echinades	(Greece)	Byzantines	Fleet of Carlo I Tocco	
15th century	1431		(Italy)	Venetians and Florentines under Pietro Loredano and Paolodi Vanni Rucellai	Genoans under Francesco Spinola	Genoa captured
15th century	1448	Battle of San Vincenzo		Neapolitans	Florentines	
15th century	1453	Fall of Constantinople	(Turkey)	Ottoman Turks	Byzantines	12 April; Byzantines are unsuccessful in defending Constantinople and the city falls
15th century	1453	Fall of Constantinople	(Turkey)	Genoese	Turks	20 April; Turks fail to prevent Genoese supply ships reaching Constantinople
15th century	1457	Battle of Bornholm	(Sweden)	3 Polish ships	Danish-Livonian fleet	Aug
15th century	1463	Battle of Vistula Lagoon	(Poland)	Polish and Prussian Confederation	Teutonic Order fleet	15 Sep
15th century	1476		(Portugal)	French	Genoese	13 Aug, near Cape St. Vincent
15th century	1478	Battle of Guinea	(Ghana)	11 Portuguese ships	35 Castilian ships	Castilian fleet is defeated and captured
15th century	1495	Battle of Rapallo	(Italy)	Genoese fleet under Francesco Spinola	French fleet under de Miolans	2 May; all French ships are captured
15th century	1499	Battle of Zonchio	(Greece)	Turks under Daoud Pasha	Venetians under Antonio Grimani	21, 20, 22 and 25 Aug; Turks capture the fortress of Lepanto
15th century	1500	Second Battle of Lepanto	(Greece)	Turks under Kemal Reis	Venetians	Aug

== 16th century ==
Year	Battle	Loc.	Winners	Losers	Notes
1506	Battle of Cannanore	(India)	Portuguese	Calicut kingdom	Portuguese victory under Lourenço de Almeida leadership.
1508	Battle of Chaul	(India)	Alliance of Mamluk, Gujrat and Calicut	Portuguese	Mamluk-Gujarati victory, Lourenço de Almeida killed.
1509	Battle of Diu	(India)	Portugal's Indian viceroy	Combined Egyptian-Gujarat Sultanate fleet	3 Feb, off Gujarat, India; Portuguese gains control of spice trade
1510			Maltese under Prégent de Bidoux	Venetians	
1512		(Algeria)	Genoese under Andrea Doria	Moors	At Algiers
1512	Battle of St. Mathieu	(France)	English	French	10 Aug, off Brest; Regent and Marie la Cordelière sunk
1513	Siege of Aden	(Yemen)	Tahirid Sultanate	Portuguese Empire	Tahirid victory, Portugal fails to capture Aden.
1517	Siege of Jeddah	(Saudi Arabia)	Ottoman Empire and Mamluk Sultanate	Portuguese Empire	Ottoman-Mamluk victory
1517	Battle of Zeila	(Somalia)	Portuguese Empire	Adal Sultanate	
1521	Battle of Tunmen	(China)	Ming Chinese	Portuguese	
1522	Battle of Xicaowan	(Hong Kong)	Ming Chinese	Portuguese	
1526			Swedes and Lübeckers	Pirates	
1529			Ottoman Turks under Barbarossa	Spanish	
1535			Swedes/Danes/Prussians	9 Lübeck ships	Early 1535—20 June
1535		(Denmark)	Swedes/Danes/Prussians	10 Lübeck ships	June(?), at Fyen
1538	Battle of Preveza	(Greece)	Ottoman Turks under Barbarossa	Spanish-Venetian-Papal fleet	28 Sep
1541	Raid on Ōmishima	(Japan)	Tsuruhime	Ōuchi Yoshitaka	
1541	Battle of Suez	(Egypt)	Ottoman Empire	Portuguese Empire	
1542	Ningbo Massacre	(China)	Ming China	Portugal	
1545	Battle of the Solent	(England)	English	French	18-19 July, French attack English off Portsmouth; Mary Rose sinks
1545		(England)	English	French	15 Aug, off Portsmouth
1549		(Jersey) / (Guernsey)	English	French	Early Aug(?), near Channel Islands
1552	Battle of Ponza	(Italy)	Ottoman Turks under Sinan Pasha	Genoese under Andrea Doria	Off western Italy
1555		(France)	Inconclusive melée between French privateers and a Dutch merchant fleet		11 Aug, off Calais
1558		(Guinea)	Portuguese	English and French	
1558	Battle of Gravelines	(France)	English under Count Egmont	French under Marshal de Thermes	13 July, off Gravelines
1560	Battle of Djerba	(Tunisia)	Ottoman Empire	Republic of Genoa and Spanish Empire	
1563	Action of 30 May	(Denmark)	Swedes	Danes	Northern Seven Years' War is declared
1563	Action of 11 September	(Sweden)	Inconclusive battle between Danes/Lübeckers and Swedes		Part of the Northern Seven Years' War
1564	Action of 30 May	(Sweden)	Danes/Lübeckers under Trolle	Swedes under Bagge	Part of the Northern Seven Years' War
1564	Action of 12 July	(Germany)	Danish	Swedish	During the Northern Seven Years' War, Swedish captain blows up his ship to prevent it being captured, killing all but two navymen
1564	Action of 12 August	(Sweden)	Swedes under Klas Horn	Danes under Herluf Trolle	Southeast of Öland during the Northern Seven Years' War
1565	Action of 4 June	(Germany)	Indecisive battle between Danes/Lübeckers and Swedes		Near Buchow during the Northern Seven Years' War
1565	Action of 7 July	(Denmark)	Swedes	Danes/Lübeckers	Between Bornholm and Rügen during the Northern Seven Years' War
1565	Battle of Fukuda Bay	(Japan)	Portuguese	Matsura clan	18 Oct
1566	Action of 26 July	(Sweden)	Swedes	Danes/Lübeckers	Between Öland and Gotland during the Northern Seven Years' War
1568			Swedes	Polish	Several Polish corsairs are captured and reminder are driven off during the Northern Seven Years' War; outcome unconfirmed
1568	Encounter in San Juan de Ulúa	(Mexico)	Spanish under Martin Enriquez	English under Hawkins	23 Sep, at San Juan de Ulúa
1570			English under Burrough and Hodsdon	Danes	In the Baltic Sea
1570	Battle of Gozo	(Malta)	Turkish under Uluch Ali	Maltese under Saint-Clement	15 July, near Gozo
1571	Siege of Famagusta	(Cyprus)	Ottoman Turks	Venetians	Ottoman victory under Lala Mustafa Pasha leadership.
1571	Battle of Lepanto	(Greece)	Christian coalition	Ottoman Turks	7 Oct, large galley fight off western Greece
1572		(Greece)	Venetians under Colonna vs Turks under Kilitch Ali		7 and 10 Aug, between Cervi and Cerigo and near Cape Matapan
1572			Several skirmishes between Spanish/Venetians and Turks		Sep/Oct
1573	Battle of Flushing	(Netherlands)	Sea Beggars	Spanish under Sancho d'Avila	17 April
1573	Battle of Borsele	(Netherlands)	Sea Beggars	Spanish under Sancho d'Avila	22 April
1573	Battle of Haarlemmermeer	(Netherlands)	Spanish under Bossu	Sea Beggars	26 May
1573	Battle on the Zuiderzee	(Netherlands)	Sea Beggars under Cornelis Dirkszoon	Spanish under Bossu	11 Oct
1574	Battle of Reimerswaal	(Netherlands)	Sea Beggars under Willem Boisot	Spanish under Luis de Resquesens	29 Jan
1574	Battle of lillo	(Belgium)	Sea Beggars under Willem Boisot	Spanish fleet	30 May
1574			Swedes	Lübeckers	June; 3 Lübeckers and 15 merchantmen are captured
1576	First Battle of Kizugawaguchi	(Japan)	Mōri Terumoto	Oda Nobunaga	Blockade efforts in Siege of Ishiyama Honganji, just off Osaka
1578	Second Battle of Kizugawaguchi	(Japan)	Oda Nobunaga	Mōri Terumoto	Blockade efforts in Siege of Ishiyama Honganji, just off Osaka
1582	Battle of Terceira	(Portugal)	Spanish under Alvaro de Bazán	French, Portuguese, Dutch and English under Filippo Strozzi	26 July, in the Azores; AKA Battle of Ponta Delgada
1582	Battle of Vila Franca	(Portugal)	Spanish under Alvaro de Bazán	French, Portuguese, Dutch and English under Filippo Strozzi	27 July; Alvaro de Bazán wins a second battle at the Azores in as many days.
1583?			Maltese under Avogadro vs Turks		
1583		(Greece)	Venetians	Maltese under Avogadro	3 Aug; between Cerigotto and Cape Spada
1585			Maltese	Turkish	April; Turkish ship captured
1585	Japanese landing in Vietnam	(Vietnam)	Nguyen Lord navy	Shirahama Kenki pirates	
1586	Battle of Pantelleria	(Italy)	English under Edward Wilkinson	Spanish and Maltese under Pedro de Gamboa y Leyva	At Pantellaria
1588	Spanish Armada	(England)		Spain and Portugal	Series of conflicts in July/Aug, off southern England
1588	Battle of Gravelines	(France)	English	Spain and Portugal	Aug
1588	Spanish Armada in Ireland	(Republic of Ireland)	Irish	Spain and Portugal	Sep
1589	Defeat of the English Armada	(Spain) / (Portugal)	Spanish	English	April
1591			English vs Spanish under Diego de la Ribera		About 13 June
1591	Battle of Flores	(Portugal)	Spanish	English	Near the Azores
1592	Battle of Okpo	(South Korea)	Korean navy under Yi Sun-sin	Japanese navy under Todo Takatora	7 May
1592	Battle of Sacheon	(South Korea)	Korean navy under Yi Sun-sin	Japanese	29 May; Koreans use the Turtle Ship
1592	Battle of Hansan Island	(South Korea)	Korean navy under Yi Sun-sin	Japanese	14 Aug, in the bay of Hansan Island
1592	Battle of Busan	(South Korea)	Korean navy under Yi Sun-sin	Japanese	1 Nov; Koreans could not occupy Japanese-controlled Busan
1594	Action of San Mateo Bay	(Ecuador)	Spanish	English	Richard Hawkins is taken as prisoner
1595	Action of 1595	(Italy)	Bizertans	Maltese	About late June
1596	Drake's Assault on Panama	(Panama)	Spanish	English	End of English raiding/invasion expeditions of the Spanish Main led by Drake and Hawkins (died 1595); Drake is killed
1597	Battle of Chilchonryang	(South Korea)	Japanese Navy and Japanese army	Korean Navy under Wŏn Kyun	28 Aug
1597	Battle of Myeongnyang	(South Korea)	13 Korean ships under Yi Sun-sin	330 Japanese ships	26 Oct
1597			Bizertans vs Genoese and Romans		
1597	Islands Voyage	(Portugal)	Spanish	English	Near the Azores
1598	Battle of Noryang	(South Korea)	Chinese under Chen Lin and Koreans under Yi Sun-sin	Japanese	16 Dec; 100 Japanese ships are damaged but another 150 successfully retreat
1600	Action of 14 December	(Philippines)	Dutch vs Spanish		14 Dec, at Manila

== 17th century ==
=== Early 17th century ===
Year	Date	Battle	Loc.	Winners	Losers	Notes
1601	27 Dec	Battle of Bantam	(Indonesia)	Dutch	Portuguese	In Bantam Bay
1602	3-4 Oct	Battle of the Narrow Seas	(England)	Dutch under van Duivenvoorde	Spanish under Spinola	
1603	26 May	Battle of Sluis	(Netherlands)	Dutch under de Moor	Spanish under Spinola	
1604	Oct	Action of October 1604		Tuscans	Tunisians	
1605	July	Battle of the Channel	(England)	Dutch under Haultain	Spanish fleet of transport ships	Near Dover; Spanish fleet is partly destroyed
1605	Nov	Attack on Salinas de Araya	(Venezuela)	Spanish under Fajardo	Dutch smugglers and privateers	At Araya Peninsula
1606	16 June or 6 Oct	Battle of Cape St. Vincent	(Portugal)	Spanish under Fajardo	Dutch under Haultain	
1606	17 Aug	Battle of Cape Rachado	(Malaysia)	Portuguese fleet under Castro	Dutch under de Jonge	Near Malacca
1606	21 Sep	Second battle of Cape Rachado	(Malaysia)	Dutch under de Jonge	Portuguese	Near Malacca
1607	25 April	Battle of Gibraltar	(Gibraltar)	Dutch under van Heemskerk	Spanish	
1607	20 Oct	Action of 20 October		Tuscans under Beauregard	Turkish trade fleet	
1609	About May	Action of 1609		French under Beaulieu vs Tunisians		
1609	29 June	Raid on La Goulette	(Tunisia)	Spanish-French	Tunis	
1609		Action of 1609	(Greece)	Venetians	Turks	Near Paxos
1609	July	Battle of Paphos	(Cyprus)	Turks under Khalil	French under Fressinet	Near Cyprus
1609	Late			Turks vs French under Beaulieu		
1610	3-6 Jan	Nossa Senhora da Graça incident	(Japan)	Portuguese	Japanese	
1610	21 Aug	Action of 21 August		Tuscans vs Turks		
1610	10 Oct	Action of 10 October		Tuscans vs Turks		
1611	End of Aug?		(Sweden)	Minor action between Danes and Swedes		In Kalmar Strait
1612	23 or 25 May	Raid on La Goulette	(Tunisia)	Sicilian-Spanish galley fleet	Tunisians	At La Goulette
1612	29-30 Nov	Battle of Swally	(India)	British East India Company	Portuguese	Surat, India
1613	29 Aug	Battle of Cape Corvo	(Turkey)	Sicilian-Spanish galley fleet under d'Aragona	Turkish trade fleet	
1615	30–? Jan			English	Portuguese	Mainly minor skirmishes
1615	17 July	Action of 17 July	(Peru)	Dutch under Spilbergen	Spanish under Pulgar	Near Valdivia, Peru
1615	Dec	Raid on La Goulette	(Tunisia)	Sicilian-Spanish galley fleet under Ribera	Tunisans	At La Goulette
1616	Jan	Action of January 1616		Spanish vs ?		
1616	29 April	Action of 29 April	(Greece)	Tuscans under Inghirami	Turks	Near Euboea
1616	14-16 July	Battle of Cape Celidonia	(Turkey)	Spanish-Neapolitans under Ribera	Turks	First regular action between galleys and sailing ships in the Mediterranean
1616	July	Action of July 1616		Spanish vs Dutch		
1616	About Oct			Neapolitans/Sicilian galleys	Larger Turkish galley fleet	Possible engagement
1617	April 13	Battle of Ragusa	(Croatia)	Spanish under Ribera	Venetians	
1617	14-15 April	Battle of Playa Honda	(Philippines)	Spanish	Dutch	
1617	12 June			Neapolitans/Sicilians vs Venetians		Minor skirmish
1617	Aug	Battle of Cape Palos	(Spain)	Algerines	Spanish	
1617	Oct	Raid on La Goulette	(Tunisia)	Spanish under d'Aragona	Tunisians	At La Goulette
1617	19-20 Nov	Action of 19 November		Inconclusive battle between Sicilians and Venetians		
1618	24 June	Battle of Gibraltar	(Gibraltar)	Inconclusive battle between Venice-hired Dutch ships and a Dutch-Spanish fleet		
1618	2-4 July	Action of 2 July	(Gibraltar)	Dutch under Lambert and Spanish under Vidazábal	Algerines	
1618	23-28 Dec	Action of 23 December	(Indonesia)	English vs Dutch		Near Jakarta
1619	18-19 Jan	Action of 18 January	(Malta)	Maltese vs Algerines		Near Malta
1619	19 Feb	Action of 19 February	(Cape Verde)	Danish	French pirates	
1619	1 March	Capture of Nassau Huis	(Indonesia)	English	Dutch East India Company	Near Jakarta
1619	31 May		(France)	Dutch	French	At the mouth of the Vilaine River
1619				English	Portuguese	
1620	11 May	Action of 11 May		Venetians under Nani	Spanish under Silva	
1620	26 June	Action of 26 June		Tuscans	Bizertans	
1620	28 Dec		(Iran)	British East India Company	Portuguese	At Cape Jask
1622	22-24 June	Battle of Macau	(China)	Portuguese	Dutch East India Company	
1622	13-14 July		(Mozambique)	English and Dutch	Portuguese	Near Mozambique
1622	27 Oct	Naval battle of Saint-Martin-de-Ré	(France)	Inconclusive fight between French and Rochellais (Huguenot) rebels		Near La Rochelle
1622			(Gibraltar)	Dutch ships under Swartenhondt	Spanish squadron	Swartenhondt's fleet was escorting a convoy near Gibraltar
1622		Bombardment of Algiers	(Algeria)	English naval bombardment of Algiers		
1624	3 Oct	Action of 3 October	(Italy)	A combined squadron of fifteen Neapolitan (Spain), Tuscan, and Papal galleys	A squadron of six Algerian ships	On San Pietro Island near Sardinia
1625	Jan	Battle of Blavet	(France)	French Rochellais rebels	French	French fleet captured
1625	11-12 Feb	Battle off Hormuz		Portuguese	English and Dutch	
1625	26 June	Action of 26 June	(Italy)	Bizertans	Maltese	Near Syracuse, Sicily
1625	16 July	Naval battle of Pertuis Breton	(France)	French Huguenot under Soubise	French Royalists with hired Dutch ships	Near La Rochelle
1625	15 Sep	Naval battle of Saint-Martin de Ré	(France)	French Royalists under Montmorency with hired English and Dutch ships	French Huguenots under Guiton and Soubise	Royalists recapture Île de Ré and Ile d'Oléron
1626	Late	Action of 1626		Danes	Dunkirkers	
1627	28 Nov	Battle of Oliwa	(Poland)	Poles	Swedes	
1628	21 June	Action of 21 June	(Turkey)	English	Venetians/French	At Scanderoon
1628	31 July	Capture of the Honduran treasure fleet	(Cuba)	Dutch ships under Ita	2 Spanish treasure ships	Spanish ships are captured
1628	7-8 Sep	Battle in the Bay of Matanzas	(Cuba)	Dutch ships under Ita	Spanish treasure fleet	Spanish ships are captured
1628	29 Sep	Third La Rochelle expedition	(France)	French Royalists	English	Near La Rochelle
1629	18 June	Battle of Dungeness	(England)	Dutch under Hein	Dunkirkers	Off England; Hein is killed
1629	June—Dec	Battle of Duyon River	(Malaysia)	Portuguese	Acehnese	
1629	16 Sep	Action of 16 September	(Germany)	Swedes	Holy Roman Empire	Near Wismar
1630	4-8 Sep	Action of 4 September		Danes	Hanseatics	In Elbe River; Hanseatic ships forced to retreat
1631	12 Sep	Battle of Abrolhos	(Brazil)	Undecided encounter between a Dutch and a Spanish/Portuguese fleet		Off Pernambuco
1631	12-13 Sep	Battle of the Slaak	(Netherlands)	Dutch Zeeland fleet under Hollare	Spanish invasion fleet	
1633	7 July—22 Oct	Battle of Liaoluo Bay	(Taiwan)	Ming China	Allied fleet of Dutch East India Company and Chinese pirates	One company's vessel is burnt and one is captured by the Chinese; most of pirates' vessels sunk or captured
1634	About early May		(Greece)	Maltese galleys	Turkish vessels	At Zante
1634	19 July			Maltese galleys under Valdina	Tripolitans	
1634				Maltese under Villages	Turks	
1634				Maltese privateers	Turks	
1635	21 Aug			Dunkirkers squadron under Collaart	Dutch guardships	Dunkirkers capture 60 fishing trawlers
1635	25 Aug			Dunkirkers squadron under Collaart	Dutch guardships	Dunkirkers capture 24 fishing trawlers
1635	About 25 Sep			Spanish	Dutch West India Company convoy	
1636	29 Feb		(France)	Dutch Zeeland squadron under Evertsen	Dunkirkers under Collaart	Near Dieppe; Collaart and Mathieu Romboutsen captured
1637	18 Feb	Battle off Lizard Point	(England)	8 Spanish ships under Horna	Dutch convoy and escort	Near The Lizard; Spanish capture 17 merchant ships
1637				Spanish under Hoces		Spanish capture 32 enemy ships in the English Channel on its return voyage to Spain
1638	About 26 March			Spanish under Hoces	Dutch	Dutch convoy captured
1638	June		(Italy)	Maltese galleys	Tripolitan sailing ships	Near Calabria
1638	7 Aug		(Greece)	Venetians under Capello	Algerines	At Corfu
1638	22 Aug	Battle of Getaria	(Spain)	French under de Sourdis	Spanish galleons under Hoces	At Guetaría
1638	31 Aug—3 Sep	Battle of Cabañas	(Cuba)	Spanish treasure fleet	Dutch under Jol	
1638	1 Sep	Battle of Vado	(Italy)	French	Spanish	Galley fight near Genoa
1638		Battle of Goa	(India)	Portuguese	Dutch East India Company	1638–1639; series of engagements resulting in a failed attempt to capture Goa by the Dutch
1639	18 Feb	Action of 18 February	(France)	Dutch under Tromp	Dunkirk fleet under Miguel de Horna	
1639	16-17 Sep	Fight in the Channel		Running fight between Dutch under Tromp and Spanish under de Oquendo		Spanish seek shelter at The Downs
1639	30 Sep	Action of 30 September	(India)	Dutch	Portuguese	Near Goa
1639	31 Oct	Battle of the Downs	(England)	Dutch under Tromp	Spanish under de Oquendo	In the English Channel
1639	End of Dec			Spanish under Horna	Stronger French force	
1640	12-17 Jan	Action of 12–17 January	(Brazil)	Dutch fleet under Loos	Spanish/Portuguese fleet under de Mascarenhas	
1640	15 June	Action of 15 June	(Scotland)	Dunkirkers	Dutch	In the Shetland Isles
1640	31 July	Battle of Cádiz	(Spain)	French under Brézé	Spanish under Gomez de Sandoval	
1641	17-18 May		(United States)	Spanish	French	Near Pensacola
1641	4-6 July	Second Battle of Tarragona	(Spain)	French under de Sourdis	Spanish	
1641	20-21 Aug	Third Battle of Tarragona	(Spain)	Spanish	French	
1641	1-2 Sep?			Spanish under Pietersen	French and Portuguese	
1641	4 Nov	Battle of Cape St. Vincent	(Portugal)	Spanish	Dutch under Gijssels	At Cape St. Vincent
1642	29 June—3 July	Battle of Barcelona	(Spain)	French under Brézé	Spanish under Ciudad Real	
1642	Oct			Portuguese	Spanish	
1643	7 July	Battle of the Gianh River	(Vietnam)	Nguyễn navy	Dutch East India Company	
1643	Aug			French	Spanish	
1643	3 Sep	Battle of Cartagena	(Spain)	French	Spanish	
1644	16 May	Action of 16 May	(Denmark)	Danes	Dutch ships hired to support Sweden	During the Danish–Swedish War
1644	25 May			Danes	33 hired Dutch ships	Narrow victory during the Danish–Swedish War
1644	1 July	Battle of Colberger Heide	(Germany)	Danish and Swedish fight an inconclusive battle		During the Danish–Swedish War
1644	7 July	Action of 7 July		Danes	Swedes	Small battle during the Danish–Swedish War
1644	10 Aug	Action of 10 August	(Denmark)	Dutch under Thijsen brushes past Danish under King Christian IV		In Køge Bay during the Danish–Swedish War
1644	28 Sep	Action of 28 September	(Greece)	Maltese galleys	Turkish sailing ships	Near Rhodes; the Maltese's subsequent stay in Venetian-held Crete provoked the outbreak of war
1644	13 Oct	Battle of Femern	(Germany)	Swedish/Dutch	Danish	Decisive victory during the Danish–Swedish War

=== Later 17th century ===
Year	Date	Battle	Loc.	Winners	Losers	Notes
1645	9 Sep	Battle of Tamandare Bay	(Brazil)	Dutch under Lichthart	Portuguese under Paiva	At Tamandaré
1645			(Scotland)	Scottish	Algerian Barbary pirates	Attempted attack on Edinburgh
1645	28 or 29 Sep	Action of September 1645	(Greece)	Ottomans	Combined Christian fleet	Christians try and fail to retake Chania during the Cretan War
1645	1 Oct	Action of 1 October	(Greece)	Combined Christian fleets	Turks	Christians successfully capture Chania during the Cretan War
c. 1646?				French under du Mé	Spanish	
1646	15 March—4 Oct	Battles of La Naval de Manila	(Philippines)	Two Spanish galleons with Spanish and Filipino crew	Dutch invasion fleet	Five separate actions over several months
1646	26 May	Action of 26 May	(Turkey)	Venetians	Turks	Failed attempt to break Venetian blockade of the Dardanelles during the Cretan War
1646	14-16 June	Battle of Orbetello	(Italy)	Spanish	French invasion fleet commanded by Brézé	
1646	14 Aug	Battle of Chania	(Greece)	Inconclusive fight between Christians and the Ottoman fleet		At Chania Bay during the Cretan War
1647	27 Jan	Action of 27 January	(Greece)	Venetians under Morosini	45 Ottoman galleys under Koca Musa Pasha	After suffering significant casualties, the Turks are driven off by the arrival of the remaining Venetian fleet during the Cretan War. Morosini and Koca Musa Pasha are both killed during the battle.
1647	10 June	Battle of Puerto de Cavite	(Philippines)	Spanish	Dutch	Near Manila
1647	25 Aug		(Greece)	Inconclusive skirmish between Christians and Turks		During the Cretan War
1647	9 Sep		(Greece)	Inconclusive skirmish between Christians and Turks		During the Cretan War
1647	Oct	Establishment of the Neapolitan Republic	(Italy)	Spanish	French	At Ischia, Pozzuoli, and Salerno; French are forced out of southern Italy
1649	6 May			Minor battle between Venetians and Turks		During the Cretan War
1649	12 May	Battle of Focchies	(Greece)	Venetians	Large Turkish fleet	During the Cretan War
1649	15 July	Action of 15 July	(Greece)	Venetians vs Turks		During the Cretan War
1649	18 July		(Greece)	Venetians vs Turks		During the Cretan War
1650	26 July		(Portugal)	Minor battle between Parliamentarians and Royalists/Portuguese		Near Lisbon
1650	20 Oct			Parliamentarians	French	French frigate is captured
1650	23 Nov	Action of 23 November	(Spain)	Spanish	French	Minor naval battle
1651	8-10 July	Action of 10 July	(Greece)	Venetians under Mocenigo	Turks	During the Cretan War
1652	29 May	Battle of Dover	(England)	Clash between English under Blake and Dutch under Tromp		Off Dover; initiated the First Anglo-Dutch War
1652	26 Aug	Battle of Plymouth	(England)	de Ruyter's 36 men-of-war	Ayscue's 45 men-of-war	During the First Anglo-Dutch War
1652	7 Sep	Battle of Elba	(Italy)	Dutch under van Galen	English under Badiley	During the First Anglo-Dutch War
1652	8 Oct	Battle of the Kentish Knock	(England)	English under Blake	Dutch under de With	During the First Anglo-Dutch War
1652	10 Dec	Battle of Dungeness	(England)	Dutch under Tromp	English under Blake	During the First Anglo-Dutch War
1653	28 Feb—2 March	Battle of Portland	(England)	English under Blake	Dutch under Tromp	Dutch lose nine men-of-war and about 25 merchantmen during the First Anglo-Dutch War
1653	13 March	Battle of Leghorn	(Italy)	Dutch under Johan van Galen	English under Badiley and Appleton	During the First Anglo-Dutch War
1653	12-13 June	Battle of the Gabbard	(England)	English	Dutch	During the First Anglo-Dutch War
1653	8-10 Aug	Battle of Scheveningen	(Netherlands)	Dutch under Tromp	English blockading fleet under Albemarle	Both sides retreat in a First Anglo-Dutch War battle; Tromp is killed
1654	23 March	Action of 23 March	(Sri Lanka)	Skirmish between Dutch and Portuguese		Near Colombo
1654	April		(Greece)	Maltese privateers	Turks	Near Rhodes during the Cretan War
1654	2 May	Action of 2 May	(Sri Lanka)	Dutch	Portuguese	Near Colombo
1654	16 May	First Battle of the Dardanelles	(Turkey)	Turks under Murat	Venetians under Delfino	Dardanelles during the Cretan War
1654	21 June		(Greece)	Venetians	Turks	Turks retreat after skirmish west of Milos during the Cretan War
1655		Bombardment of Algiers	(Algeria)	English	Algerines	
1655	14 April 14	Action of 14 April	(Tunisia)	English under Blake	Barbary ships	At Porto Farina
1655	21 June	Second Battle of the Dardanelles	(Turkey)	Venetians under Mocenigo	Turks under Mustafa	Dardanelles during the Cretan War
1655			(Spain)	French under Vendôme	Spanish	Near Barcelona
1656	22 June	Battle of Kotlin	(Russia)	Russia	Sweden	
1656	26-27 June	Third Battle of the Dardanelles	(Turkey)	Venetians and Maltese under Marcello	Turks under Chinam Pasha	Dardanelles during the Cretan War
1656	July	Battle of Nöteborg	(Russia)	Swedish	Russians	
1657	20 April	Battle of Santa Cruz de Tenerife	(Spain)	English under Blake	Spanish	
1657	3 May	Action of 3 May		Venetians under Mocenigo	Algerines	During the Cretan War
1657	18 May	Action of 18 May	(Greece)	Venetians under Mocenigo	Turks and Algerines	At Suazich during the Cretan War
1657	17-19 July	Fourth Battle of the Dardanelles	(Turkey)	Venetians, Maltese and Papal forces under Mocenigo	Turks	In Dardanelles during the Cretan War
1657	12-13 Sep	Battle of Møn	(Denmark)	Danes and Swedes fight inconclusively		Near Møn
1657	Sep—12 Nov	Siege of Lemnos	(Greece)	Ottomans	Venetians	
1658	19 May		(Turkey)	Venetians under Contarini	Turks	Between Imbros and the Dardanelles during the Cretan War
1658	8 Nov	Battle of the Sound	(Denmark)	Danish-allied Dutch	Swedish	Large battle near Copenhagen; Danish ships watch but are unable to participate
1659	Mid-March	Capture of Kalamata	(Greece)	Venetians	Ottomans	Venetians conquer parts of Kalamata
1659	30 March			Minor battle between Dutch and Danes against Swedes		
1659	30 April	Battle of Fehrmarn	(Denmark)	Inconclusive battle between Swedish and Dutch/Danes		Small running battle
1659	30 April	Battle of Rödsund	(Germany) / (Denmark)	Inconclusive battle between Swedish and Dutch/Danes		
1659	15 July	Battle of Ebeltoft	(Denmark)	Swedish	Dutch/Danes	
1659	26 or 27 Aug	Action of August 1659		Venetians under Contarini vs Turks		During the Cretan War
1659	14 Nov	Battle of Nyborg	(Denmark)	Dutch/Danes under de Ruyter	Swedes	Nyborg is liberated from the Swedish
1660	26 May—12 June			Venetians vs Turks		Minor skirmish during the Cretan War
1661	End of March			Venetians	Turks	Minor skirmish during the Cretan War
1661	18 May			Venetians	Turks	Minor skirmish during the Cretan War
1661	27 Aug	Action of 27 August	(Greece)	Venetians and Maltese	Turks	Near Milos during the Cretan War
1661		Bombardment of Algiers	(Algeria)			
1662	29 Sep	Action of 29 September	(Greece)	Venetians	Turkish "Alexandria Caravan"	Between Kos and Kalymnos during the Cretan War
1664	29 Dec	Action of 29 December		English squadron under Allin	Dutch merchant fleet	During the Second Anglo-Dutch War
1665	March	Action of March 1665	(Tunisia)	French under Beaufort	Algerines	Near La Goulette during the Cretan War
1665	13 June	Battle of Lowestoft	(England)	English under York	Dutch under Van Wassenaer	Decisive victory during the Second Anglo-Dutch War
1665	2 Aug	Battle of Vågen	(Norway)	Dutch merchant fleet	English	English fail to capture richly laden Dutch merchant fleet in the bay of Bergen during the Second Anglo-Dutch War
1665	24 Aug	Battle of Cherchell	(Algeria)	French under Beaufort	Algerines	At Cherchell during the Cretan War
1665	27 Nov	Battle of Port Delphino	(Greece)	French under d'Escrainville	Turks	During the Cretan War
1666	20 May		(Saint Kitts and Nevis)	Undecided encounter between an English and a combined Dutch/French squadron		At the isle of Nevis during the Second Anglo-Dutch War
1666	11-14 June	Four Days Battle	(England)	Dutch under de Ruyter	English under Albemarle and Rupert	During the Second Anglo-Dutch War
1666	4-5 Aug	St James's Day Battle	(England)	English under Albemarle and Rupert	Dutch under de Ruyter	During the Second Anglo-Dutch War
1667	25-26 Feb	Action of 25 February	(Greece)	Venetians under Molin	Turks and Tunisians	North of Crete during the Cretan War
1667	Feb	Invasion of Surinam	(Suriname)	Dutch under Crijnssen	English under Byam	Suriname captured from the English
1667	5-9 June	Battle of the James River	(United States)	Dutch under Crijnssen	Virginia tobacco fleet	James River during the Second Anglo-Dutch War
1667	9-14 June	Raid on the Medway	(England)	Dutch	English	Dutch raid Medway river near London. The English flagship, HMS Royal Charles, is captured and the English sue for peace during the Second Anglo-Dutch War.
1667	30 June—7 July	Battle of Martinique	(Martinique)	English under Harman	French	During the Second Anglo-Dutch War
1668	8-9 March	Action of 8 March	(Greece)	Venetians	Turks	Near Pelagia during the Cretan War
1668	2 May	Action of 2 May		French	Turks	During the Cretan War
1668	About Sep	Action of 1668	(Greece)	Barbary "Turks"	Venetians	South of Crete during the Cretan War
1669	June	Action of June 1669	(Greece)	Privateers	"Alexandria Caravan" escort	Near Rhodes during the Cretan War
1669	18-19 Dec	Battle of Cádiz	(Spain)	English Mary Rose	Algerines	7 pirates
1669	28-29 Dec	Action of 28-29 December	(Gibraltar)	English Mary Rose	Algerines	
1670	17 Aug	Action of 17 August	(Gibraltar)	English/Dutch ships	Algerines	
1671	March	Battle of Saraighat	(India)	Ahom Kingdom	Mughals	Ahoms retake Guwahati
1671	May		(Greece)	Privateers	Turkish galleys	Near Egina
1672	12 March	Action of 12 March		English under Holmes	Dutch merchant fleet	During the Third Anglo-Dutch War
1672	7 June	Battle of Solebay	(England)	Inconclusive battle between Dutch under de Ruyter and English/French under York		During the Third Anglo-Dutch War
1673	7 June	First Battle of Schooneveld	(Netherlands)	Dutch	England/France	
1673	14 June	Second Battle of Schooneveld	(Netherlands)	Dutch	England/France	
1673	21 Aug	Battle of Texel	(Netherlands)	Dutch	England/France	During the Third Anglo-Dutch War
1673	1 Sep	Battle of Masulipatnam	(India)	Dutch East India Company	English East India Company	During the Third Anglo-Dutch War
1674	14 March	Battle of Ronas Voe	(Scotland)	English Navy	Dutch East India Company	Van Rotterdam captured during the Third Anglo-Dutch War
1675	11 Feb	Battle of the Lipari Islands	(Italy)	French under Vivonne	Spanish under de la Cueva	Near Lipari Islands
1675	July			English	Tripolitans	Possible engagement
1676	8 Jan	Battle of Stromboli	(Italy)	Inconclusive fight between French under Duquesne vs Dutch and Spanish under de Ruyter		
1676	24 Jan	Attack on Shipping in Tripoli	(Libya)	English	Tripolitans	
1676	22 April	Battle of Agosta	(Italy)	French under Duquesne and Dutch/Spanish under de Ruyter fight to a draw		De Ruyter is mortally wounded
1676	2 June	Battle of Palermo	(Italy)	French under Vivonne	Dutch/Spanish under de la Cerda and den Haen	
1676	3-4 June	Battle of Bornholm	(Denmark) / (Germany)	Dutch/Danish under Iuel	Swedes under Creutz	Between Bornholm and Rügen in the Baltic Sea
1676	11 June	Battle of Öland	(Sweden)	Dutch/Danish under Iuel	Swedes under Creutz	South of Öland in the Baltic Sea
1677	3 March	First Battle of Tobago	(Trinidad and Tobago)	Dutch under Binckes	French under d'Estrées	
1677	31 May—1 June	Battle of Møn	(Denmark) / (Germany)	Danes	Swedes	Between Femern and Warnemunde, Baltic Sea
1677	1/11 July	Battle of Køge Bay	(Denmark)	Danes and Dutch	Swedes	
1677	11 Dec	Second Battle of Tobago	(Trinidad and Tobago)	French under d'Estrées	Dutch under Binckes	
1678	March	Second Battle of Ushant	(France)	Undecided action between a Dutch squadron under Evertsen and a French squadron under Château-Renault		Isle of Ouessant
1679	Action of 3 May			Danes vs Swedes		
1679	Action of 26 June			Series of skirmishes culminating in a Danish victory over Sweden		
1679	Action of 28 June			Series of skirmishes culminating in a Danish victory over Sweden		
1679	Action of 2 July			Series of skirmishes culminating in a Danish victory over Sweden		
1679	Action of 20 July			Series of skirmishes culminating in a Danish victory over Sweden		
1681	23 July	Bombardment of Chios	(Greece)	French	Tripolitans	
1681	30 Sep	Action of 30 September	(Portugal)	Spanish	Brandenburgers	Near Cape St. Vincent
1682	July—Aug	Bombardment of Algiers	(Algeria)	Algerines	French	
1683	June—July	Bombardment of Algiers	(Algeria)	Inconclusive French naval operation against Algiers		
1683	10-16 July	Battle of Penghu	(Taiwan)	Qing dynasty	Kingdom of Tungning	Tungning capitulates to the Qing
1685		Bombardment of Tripoli	(Libya)	French under d'Estrées	Tripolitans	Large parts of Tripoli are destroyed; Tripolitania capitulates to France
1686	12 July		(Greece)	Venetians attacks "Alexandria Caravan" with its Turkish and Tripolitan escort		Between Naxos and Nicaria
1686	4 Oct		(Greece)	Venetians vs Turks		Near Mitylene
c. 1687/88?				Turks and Algerines under Mezzomorto	Venetians	
1688	15 June		(Greece)	Venetians attacks "Alexandria Caravan" with its Turkish and Algerian escort		East of Naxos
1688	June—July	Bombardment of Algiers	(Algeria)	Algerines	French	
1689	11 May	Battle of Bantry Bay	(Republic of Ireland)	French	English	
1689			(Guernsey)	French vs English		Near Casquets
1690	26 March	Action of 26 March		Turks and Algerines under Mezzomorto	Venetians under Valier	
1690	10 July	Battle of Beachy Head	(England)	French	Anglo-Dutch	
1690	8 Sep	Battle of Mytilene	(Greece)	Venetians fight the combined fleet of Turkey, Algiers, Tripoli and Tunis		Near Mytilene
1690			(India)	French vs English and Dutch		Near Madras
1691	22 Sep	Naval battle off St. John	(Canada)	French	English	
1692	27 May—3 June	Battle of Barfleur and La Hougue	(France)	English/Dutch	French	Decisive English win in the War of the Grand Alliance
1692			(Spain)	French	Spanish	Near Cape Finisterre
1692			(Malta)	French	Tripolitans	
1693	27 June	Battle of Lagos Bay	(Portugal)	French under Tourville		French capture 50 out of 140 merchantmen
1694	23 March	Battle of Daman	(India)	Portuguese	Omani	
1694	29 June	Battle of Texel	(Netherlands)	French under Bart	Dutch under de Vries and others	
1695	9 and 19 Feb	Battle of the Oinousses Islands	(Greece)	Turkish	Venetians under Zeno	
1695	16 April	Action of 16 April		French	English	
1695	18 April	Action of 18 April	(England)	Dano-Swedish	English	
1695	10 Aug	Action of 10 August		English	Swedish	
1695	18 Sep	Battle of Zeytinburnu	(Greece)	Turks under Mezzomorto	Venetians under Contarini	
1695	Dec	Anglo–Swedish skirmish		English	Swedish	
1696	17 June	Battle of Dogger Bank		French	Dutch	
1696			(Canada)	French vs English		In Newfoundland
1696	27 May	Second Azov campaign	(Russia)	Russians	Ottomans	
1696	Summer	Battle of Mamora	(Morocco)	Portugal	Morocco	
1696						Near San Domingo
1696	14 July	Action of 14 July 1696	(Canada)	French under D'Iberville	English	
1696	14-15 Aug	Siege of Pemaquid	(United States)	French and Abenaki	English	
1696	22 Aug	Battle of Andros	(Greece)	Venetians under Contarini vs Turks and their allies under Mezzomorto		Near Andros
1697	6 July	Action of 6 July	(Greece)	Venetians under Contarini vs Turks		Near Lemnos
1697	1 Sep	Action of 1 September	(Greece)	Venetians under Contarini vs Turks		Between Andros and Euboea
1697	5 Sep	Battle of Hudson's Bay	(Canada)	French	English	
1697	20 Sep	Action of 20 September	(Greece)	Venetians under Contarini vs Turks		South of Euobea
1698	20 Sep	Battle of Samothrace	(Greece)	Inconclusive: Venetians vs Turks, Tripolitans and Tunisians		Near Samothrace

== 18th century ==
=== Early 18th century ===
Year	War	Date	Battle	Loc.	Winners	Losers	Notes
1701		17 Aug	Maltese raid on La Goulette	(Tunisia)			
1702	Great Northern War	26 June		(Russia)	Sweden vs Russia		Small-ship action on Lake Ladoga
1702	War of the Spanish Succession	30 Aug—4 Sep	Action of August 1702	(Colombia)	Draw: English under Benbow vs French under du Casse		
1702	Great Northern War	7 Sep		(Russia)	Sweden vs Russia		Small-ship action on Lake Ladoga
1702	War of the Spanish Succession	23 Oct	Battle of Vigo Bay	(Spain)	Anglo-Dutch	French and Spanish	Spanish treasure fleet is destroyed
1703	War of the Spanish Succession	22 May	Battle of Cap de la Roque	(Portugal)	French under Coëtlogon	Anglo-Dutch merchant fleet under Vlacq	
1703	Great Northern War	7 Aug	Battle of Lake Peipus		Sweden vs Russia		Small-ship action on Lake Peipus
1704	Great Northern War	May 17	Battle of Lake Peipus		Sweden vs Russia		Small-ship action on Lake Peipus
1704	War of the Spanish Succession	7 Aug	Battle of Orford Ness	(England)	English under Whetstone	Swedish under Psilander	
1704	War of the Spanish Succession	24 Aug	Battle of Málaga	(Spain)	Inconclusive: English and Dutch under Rooke vs French		
1705	War of the Spanish Succession	21 March	Battle of Cabrita Point	(Spain)	English, Portuguese and Dutch under Leake	Spanish and French under Desjean	
1705	Great Northern War	26 June	Battle of Kotlin Island	(Russia)	Sweden vs Russia		Swedish ships attack Russian base of Kotlin
1705	Great Northern War	20 Aug	Battle of Hogland	(Finland)	Sweden under Anckarstjerna	Russia	
1706	War of the Spanish Succession	6 Nov	Battle of Santa Cruz de Tenerife	(Spain)	Bourbon Spanish	English under Jennings	Unsuccessful attempt to seize Santa Cruz de Tenerife
1707	War of the Spanish Succession	2 May	Action of 2 May	(England)	French under Forbin	English	
1707	War of the Spanish Succession	21 Oct	Battle at The Lizard	(England)	2 French squadrons under Forbin and Duguay-Trouin	British convoy and escort under Edwards	
1708	War of the Spanish Succession	8 June	Wager's Action	(Colombia)	British under Wager	French-Spanish under du Casse and Fernández de Santillán	AKA Battle of Barú
1709		2 March	Action of 2 March		British vs French		
1709		25 June	Action of 25 June	(Italy)	Maltese	Tripolitans	Near Santa Maria di Leuca
1709	Great Northern War	12 Dec	Action of 12 December	(Poland)	Swedes under Printz	Danes under Wibe	In Gdańsk Bay
1710		18 April			Maltese	Algerines	
1710	Great Northern War	4 Oct	Battle of Køge Bay	(Denmark)	Inconclusive: Denmark under Gyldenløve vs Sweden under Wachtmeister		In Køge Bay
1710	War of the Spanish Succession	9 Nov	Battle of Syracuse	(Italy)	Inconclusive: French under Cassard vs British		French came to break up a British blockade but arrived after they left
1711	War of the Spanish Succession	11 Aug	Capture of the galleon San Joaquin	(Colombia)	British under Littleton	Spanish under Villanueva	
1711	War of the Spanish Succession	12-22 Sep	Battle of Rio de Janeiro	(Brazil)	French under Duguay-Trouin	Portuguese	
1712	Great Northern War	11 April	Battle of Fladstrand	(Denmark)	Inconclusive: Danes under Knoff vs Swedes under Sjöblad		
1712	Great Northern War	8 Sep	Action of 8 September	(Denmark)	Swedes under Printz	Danes under Rosenpalm	Off Møn
1712	Great Northern War	27-30 Sep	Battle of Rügen	(Germany)	Inconclusive: Danes under Gyldenløve vs Swedes under Wachtmeister		
1713		12 April			Maltese	Algerines	
1713	Great Northern War	22 July	Battle of Hogland		Inconclusive: Sweden under Raab vs Russia under Cruys		
1713			Action of 1713	(India)	Portuguese	Indians	Near Chaul
1714	Great Northern War	6 Aug	Battle of Gangut	(Finland)	Russians under Apraksin	Swedish	
1715	Great Northern War	12 April	Action of 12 April	(Germany)	Swedes under Printz	Danes under von Rehdern	Off Dornbusch
1715	Great Northern War	24 April	Battle of Fehmarn	(Germany)	Danes under Gabel	Swedish under Wachtmeister	Annihilation of a Swedish squadron
1715	Great Northern War	8 Aug	Battle of Rügen	(Germany)	Inconclusive: Swedish vs Danish		
1716	Seventh Ottoman–Venetian War	8 July	Action of 8 July	(Greece)	Inconclusive: Venetians under Corner vs Turks under Canım Hoca		East of Corfu
1716	Great Northern War	8 July	Battle of Dynekilen	(Sweden)	Danes under Tordenskjold	Swedish under Strömstierna	
1717	Great Northern War	13-14 May	Battle of Gothenburg	(Sweden)	Swedish under Strömstierna	Danish under Tordenskjold	
1717	Austro-Turkish War	16 April	Battle of Slankamen	(Serbia)	Ottomans	Austrians	
1717	Seventh Ottoman–Venetian War	12-16 June	Battle of Imbros	(Greece)	Venetians under Flangini vs Turks		In northern Aegean
1717	Seventh Ottoman–Venetian War	19 July	Battle of Matapan	(Greece)	Catholic coalition of Venice, Portugal, Malta and the Papal States	Turks	In Gulf of Laconia
1717	Great Northern War	19 July	Battle of Strömstad	(Sweden)	Swedish under Giertta	Danish under Tordenskjold	Attack on Strömstad is defeated
1718			Action of 1718	(India)	Portuguese	Indians	Near Karwar
1718		20-22 July	Action of 20 July		Venetians vs Turks		
1718	War of the Quadruple Alliance	11 Aug	Battle of Cape Passaro	(Italy)	British under Byng	Spanish under de Gaztañeta	Near Sicily
1718	Great Northern War	17 or 21 Sep	Battle of Iddefjord	(Sweden) / (Norway)	Swedes under Charles XII	Danes under Paulsen	
1718	Golden Age of Piracy	26-27 Sep	Battle of Cape Fear River	(United States)	British under Rhett	Pirates under Bonnet	
1718	Golden Age of Piracy	21-22 Nov	Battle of Ocracoke	(United States)	British Navy	Blackbeard	
1719	Jacobite rising of 1719	10 May	Capture of Eilean Donan Castle	(Scotland)	British Government	Jacobites	
1719	Great Northern War	4 June	Battle of Ösel Island	(Estonia)	Russians under Senyavin	Swedes under Wrangel	
1719	Great Northern War	13 July	Assault on Strömstad	(Sweden)	Danes under Rosenpalm	Swedish under Örnfelt	
1719	War of the Quadruple Alliance	20 Dec	Battle of Cape St. Vincent	(Portugal)	Spanish under Torres	English under Cavendish	
1720	War of the Quadruple Alliance	24 Feb—1 March	Raid on Nassau	(The Bahamas)	British under Rogers	Spanish under Cornejo	
1720	Great Northern War	7 Aug	Battle of Grengam	(Finland)	Both sides claim victory: Russian galleys under Galitzine vs Swedish sailing ships under Sjöblad		
1720	Golden Age of Piracy	c. Oct	Capture of John Rackham	(Jamaica)	British	Pirates	Rackham surrenders and he and his crew are captured
1722	Golden Age of Piracy	10 Feb	Battle of Cape Lopez	(Gabon)	British	Pirates	
1722	American Indian wars	July	Battle of Winnepang	(Canada)	British colonizers	Mi'kmaq	
1723	Golden Age of Piracy	10 June	Capture of the sloop Ranger	(United States)	British	Pirates	
1726	Anglo-Spanish War	1726—1728	Blockade of Porto Bello	(Panama)	Spanish under de Gaztañeta	British under Hosier, St Lo and Hopson	Spanish treasure fleet evades British blockade; Hosier, St. Lo and Hopson are killed in action
1727	Anglo-Spanish War	11 March	Action of 11 March	(Spain)	British under Forbes	Spanish	
1738		20-29 June			Russians vs Turks		
1738		9-10 Aug			Turks	Russians	
1738	War of the Austrian Succession	20 Nov	Battle of Porto Bello	(Panama)	British under Vernon	Spanish under de la Vega	
1739	War of the Austrian Succession	8 April	Action of 8 April		British under Mayne	Spanish under Gera	
1741	War of the Austrian Succession	7-8 Jan			British vs French		In West Indies
1741	War of the Austrian Succession	12 Feb		(Gibraltar)	British vs French		Minor battle in the Gibraltar Strait
1741	War of the Austrian Succession	March—May	Battle of Cartagena de Indias	(Colombia)	Spanish	Large British expeditionary force	During the War of Jenkins' Ear
1741	War of the Austrian Succession	10 Aug	Battle of Colachel	(India)	Raja of Travancore	Dutch naval force	
1742	War of the Austrian Succession	31 May	Action of 31 May	(Finland)	Russians	Swedish	Swedes retreat after battle in Gulf of Finland
1742	War of the Austrian Succession	14 June	Action of 14 June	(France)	British	Spanish	
1743	Russo-Swedish War	20 May	Battle of Korpoström	(Finland)	Russians	Swedish	
1744	War of the Austrian Succession	22 Feb	Battle of Toulon	(France)	Draw: Franco-Spanish under Navarro vs British under Mathews		
1744	War of the Austrian Succession	8 May	Action of 8 May	(Portugal)	French	British	
1745	Jacobite rising of 1745	2 May	Skirmish of Loch nan Uamh	(Scotland)	British Navy	Jacobites	
1745	War of the Austrian Succession	18-20 May	Capture of Vigilant	(Canada)	British	French	
1745	War of the Austrian Succession	26 June	Naval battle off Tatamagouche	(Canada)	British	French	
1746	War of the Austrian Succession	25 June	Battle at Negapatam	(India)	Inconclusive: French under La Bourdonnais vs British under Peyton		
1746	War of the Austrian Succession	6 July	Action of 6 July	(India)	Inconclusive: French under La Bourdonnais vs British under Peyton		
1747	War of the Austrian Succession	14 May	First Battle of Cape Finisterre	(Spain)	British under Anson	French under de la Jonquière	
1747	War of the Austrian Succession	25 July	First Battle of the Glorioso	(Portugal)	Spanish under de la Cerda	English under Crookshanks	
1747	War of the Austrian Succession	15 Aug	Second Battle of the Glorioso	(Spain)	Inconclusive: Spanish under de la Cerda and British under Byng		
1747	War of the Austrian Succession	7 Oct	Third Battle of the Glorioso	(Portugal)	English under Walker	Spanish under de la Cerda	
1747	War of the Austrian Succession	25 Oct	Second Battle of Cape Finisterre	(Spain)	British under Hawke	French under de l'Etenduère	
1748	War of the Austrian Succession	31 Jan	Action of 31 January	(France)	British under Harland	French	
1748	War of the Austrian Succession	18 March	Action of 18 March	(Portugal)	British under Cotes	Spanish	
1748	War of the Austrian Succession	22 March	Battle of Saint-Louis-du-Sud	(Haiti)	British under Knowles	French under Chastenoye	
1748	War of the Austrian Succession	12 Oct	Battle of Havana	(Cuba)	British under Knowles	Spanish under Reggio	Last major action in the War of Jenkins' Ear

=== Later 18th century ===
Year	War	Date	Battle	Loc.	Winners	Losers	Notes
1751	Spanish-Barbary Wars	28 Nov	Action of 28 November	(Portugal)	Spanish under Stuart	Algerines	
1752	Portuguese colonial campaigns	11 Dec	Battle of Calicut	(India)	Portuguese	Marathas	
1755	Spanish-Barbary Wars	16 April	Action of 16 April	(Spain)	Spanish	Algerines	
1755	Seven Years' War	8 June	Action of 8 June 1755	(Canada)	British under Boscawen	French under Hocquart	
1756	Seven Years' War	20 May	Battle of Minorca	(Spain)	French under La Galissonnière	British under Byng	
1757	Seven Years' War	23 March	Battle of Chandannagar	(India)	British under Clive and Watson	French Indies Company	
1757	Seven Years' War	21 Oct	Battle of Cap-Français	(Haiti)	Inconclusive: French under Kersaint vs British under Forrest		At Saint-Domingue
1758	Seven Years' War			(France)	French under du Chaffault vs British under Boscawen		Minor battle near Ushant
1758	Seven Years' War			(Gibraltar)	French under du Revest vs British under Saunders		Minor battle near Gibraltar Strait
1758	Seven Years' War	28 Feb	Battle of Cartagena	(Spain)	British under Osborn	French under Duquesne	
1758	Seven Years' War	29 April	Action of 29 April		British under Denis	French under Rohan	In the Bay of Biscay
1758	Seven Years' War	29 April	Battle of Cuddalore	(India)	British under Pocock	French under d'Aché	
1758	Spanish-Barbary Wars	9-10 June	Battle of Cape Palos	(Spain)	Spanish	Algerines	
1758	Seven Years' War	3 Aug	Battle of Negapatam	(India)	British under Pocock	French under d'Aché	
1759	Seven Years' War	3-5 July	Le Havre raid	(France)	British under Rodney	French under Charles, Prince of Soubise	
1759	Seven Years' War	19 Aug	Battle of Lagos	(Portugal)	British under Boscawen	French under La Clue-Sabran	
1759	Seven Years' War	10 Sep	Battle of Frisches Haff	(Poland)	Swedish	Prussians	Near Szczecin
1759	Seven Years' War	10 Sep	Battle of Pondicherry	(India)	Inconclusive: British fight French but are too damaged to pursue		
1759	Seven Years' War	20 Nov	Battle of Quiberon Bay	(France)	British under Hawke	French under Brienne	Near St Nazaire
1760	Seven Years' War	17 Feb	Battle of Bishops Court	(Isle of Man)	British under Elliot	French under Thurot	Thurot is killed in action
1760	French and Indian War	16 May	Battle of Pointe-aux-Trembles	(Canada)	British under Swanton	French under Vauquelin	
1760	Seven Years' War	3-8 July	Battle of Restigouche	(Canada)	British under Byron	French relief force	
1760	Seven Years' War	17-19 Oct	Battle of the Windward Passage	(Cuba) / (Haiti)	British under Holmes	French	
1761	Seven Years' War	17 July	Action of 17 July	(Spain)	British	French	
1761	Seven Years' War	13-14 Aug	Battle of Cape Finisterre	(Spain)	British	French	
1762	Anglo-Spanish War	31 May	Action of 31 May	(Spain)	British under Sawyer and Pownoll	Spanish	
1762	Anglo-Spanish War	6 June—13 Aug	Siege of Havana	(Cuba)	British	Spanish	British siege Spanish-held Havana, gaining control until the Treaty of Paris
1762	Anglo-Spanish War	30 Oct	Action of 30 October	(Philippines)	British under Parker	Spanish	
1762	Anglo-Spanish War	Oct	Siege of Colónia do Sacramento	(Uruguay)	Spanish under Cevallos	Portuguese	
1763	Anglo-Spanish War	Jan	Second Siege of Colónia do Sacramento	(Uruguay)	Spanish under Cevallos	Portuguese	
1765	Franco–Moroccan conflicts	25-28 June	Larache expedition	(Morocco)	Moroccans under Mohammed III	French under du Chaffault	French fail to take Larache
1766		February	Meermin slave mutiny	(South Africa)	Dutch East India Company and Afrikaners militia	Slaves from Madagascar	
1770	Russo-Turkish War	27-28 May	Battle of Nauplia	(Greece)	Turks	Russians	
1770	Russo-Turkish War	4 June	Action of 4 June	(Greece)	Russians vs Turks		Minor battle south of Athens
1770		10 June	Capture of Port Egmont	(Falkland Islands)	Inconclusive: Spanish vs British		Start of the Falklands Crisis of 1770
1770	Russo-Turkish War	5–7 July	Battle of Chesma	(Turkey)	Russians	Turkish	Turkish ships are burned off western Turkey
1772	Russo-Turkish War	6-8 Nov	Battle of Patras	(Greece)	Russians	Turkish	West of Patrai
1773	Russo-Turkish War	4 July	Action of 4 July		Inconclusive: Russians under van Kinsbergen vs Turks		
1773	Russo-Turkish War	3 Sep	Action of 3 September		Inconclusive: Russians under van Kinsbergen vs Turks		
1774	Russo-Turkish War	1 July and 20 July	First Battle of Kerch Strait	(Russia)	Russians under Tchitchagov and Seniavin	Turks	
1775	American Revolutionary War	11-12 June	Battle of Machias	(United States)	Americans under O'Brien	British	
1775	American Revolutionary War	27 Aug	Raid on Saint John	(Canada)	Americans under O'Brien	British	
1776	American Revolutionary War	3-4 March	Raid of Nassau	(The Bahamas)	Americans under Hopkins and Nicholas	British under Browne	
1776	American Revolutionary War	6 April	Battle of Block Island	(United States)	British	Americans under Hopkins	
1776	American Revolutionary War	29 June	Battle of Turtle Gut Inlet	(United States)	Americans under Barry	British under Hudson and Graeme	
1776	American Revolutionary War	22 Sep—22 Nov	Raid on Canso	(Canada)	Americans under Jones	British	
1776	American Revolutionary War	11 Oct	Battle of Valcour Island	(United States)	British under Carleton	Americans under Arnold	
1777	American Revolutionary War	28 March	Battle off Yarmouth	(Canada)	British	Americans	
1777	American Revolutionary War	8-9 July	Capture of USS Hancock	(Canada)	British	Americans	
1777	American Revolutionary War	26 Sep—16 Nov	Siege of Fort Mifflin	(United States)	British under Howe	Americans under Hazelwood	Americans defend Philadelphia on the Delaware River
1778	American Revolutionary War	7 March	Battle off Barbados	(Barbados)	British under Biddle	Americans	
1778	American Revolutionary War	19 April	Frederica Naval Action	(United States)	Americans	British under Elbert	
1778	American Revolutionary War	24 April	North Channel Naval Duel		Americans under Jones	British	
1778	American Revolutionary War	24 April	Battle off Liverpool	(Canada)	British	French	
1778	American Revolutionary War	17 June	Action of 17 June	(England)	Inconclusive: British and French both claim victory		
1778	American Revolutionary War	27 July	First Battle of Ushant	(France)	Inconclusive: British under Keppel with 30 ships vs French under d'Orvilliers with 28 ships		
1778	American Revolutionary War	11 Sep	Action of 11 September	(France)	French	British	
1778	American Revolutionary War	20 Oct	Action of 20 October	(Spain)	Inconclusive: British vs French under Ligondès		
1778	American Revolutionary War	15 Dec	Battle of St. Lucia	(Saint Lucia)	British under Barrington	French under d'Estaing	
1779	American Revolutionary War	31 Jan	Action of 31 January	(France)	British under Pownoll	French	
1779	American Revolutionary War	13 May	Action of 13 May	(France)	British under Wallace	French	
1779	American Revolutionary War	6 July	Battle of Grenada	(Grenada)	French under d'Estaing	British under Byron	
1779	American Revolutionary War	24 July	Penobscot Expedition	(United States)	British under Collier	Americans under Lovell and Saltonstall	
1779	American Revolutionary War	10 Sep	Battle of Lake Pontchartrain	(United States)	American-Spanish under Pickles	British	
1779	American Revolutionary War	11 Sep	Action of 11 Sep	(United States)	French	British under Mackenzie	
1779	American Revolutionary War	14 Sep	Action of 14 September	(Portugal)	British under Montagu	Spanish	
1779	American Revolutionary War	23 Sep	Battle of Flamborough Head	(England)	Outcome disputed: Americans under Jones and British under Pearson		British save convoy of 41 merchant ships; Jones captures Serapis and Countess of Scarborough but loses Bonhomme Richard
1779	American Revolutionary War	6 Oct	Action of 6 October	(France)	French	British under Farmer	
1779	American Revolutionary War	11 Nov	Action of 11 November	(Portugal)	British under Graeme	Spanish	
1779	American Revolutionary War	20 Nov	Action of 20 November	(Portugal)	British	Spanish	
1779	American Revolutionary War	12 Dec	Action of 12 December	(Honduras)	British under Inglis	Spanish	
1779	American Revolutionary War	18 Dec	Battle of Martinique	(Martinique)	British under Parker	French under Lamotte	Near Fort Royal
1779	American Revolutionary War	21-22 Dec	Battle of Guadeloupe	(France)	British under Rowley	French	
1780	American Revolutionary War	8 Jan	Action of 8 January	(Spain)	British under Rodney	Spanish	
1780	American Revolutionary War	16 Jan	Battle of Cape St. Vincent	(Portugal)	British under Rodney	Spanish under Lángara	
1780	American Revolutionary War	24 Feb	Action of 24 February	(Portugal)	British under Manners	French under du Chilleau	
1780	American Revolutionary War	28-29 Feb	Battle of Ibiza	(Spain)	Inconclusive: British vs Sweden		British retreat
1780	American Revolutionary War	17 April	Battle of Martinique	(Martinique)	French under de Guichen	British under Rodney	
1780	American Revolutionary War	7 June	Action of 7 June	(United States)	Indecisive: British under Hawker vs French under Latouche		
1780	American Revolutionary War	15 June	Action of 15 June	(Belgium)	British under Pownoll	French	
1780	American Revolutionary War	9 Aug	Action of 9 August	(Portugal)	Spanish-French under Córdova	British under Moutray	55 British convoy ships are captured
1780	American Revolutionary War	10 Aug	Action of 10 August	(France)	British under Williams	French under Rumain	
1780	American Revolutionary War	13 Aug	Action of 13 August	(Republic of Ireland)	British under MacBride	French under Clonard	
1780	American Revolutionary War	30 Sep	Action of 30 September	(Bermuda)	British under Montagu	French	
1780	American Revolutionary War				Spanish-French under Córdova	British	29 British convoy ships are captured
1781	American Revolutionary War	4 Jan	Action of 4 January	(France)	British under Goodall and Mulgrave	French under Tanouarn and Grimouard	
1781	American Revolutionary War	4 Feb	Action of 4 February	(Anguilla)	British under Moreton	Dutch under Krul	
1781	American Revolutionary War	25 Feb	Action of 25 February	(Spain)	British under Mann	Spanish	
1781	American Revolutionary War	16 March	Battle of Cape Henry	(United States)	Inconclusive: French under Destouches vs British under Arbuthnot		
1781	American Revolutionary War	16 April	Battle of Porto Praya	(Cape Verde)	Inconclusive: French under Suffren vs British under Johnstone		
1781	American Revolutionary War	29-30 April	Battle of Fort Royal	(Martinique)	French under de Grasse	British under Hood	
1781	American Revolutionary War	1 May	Action of 1 May	(France)	British under Collier	Spanish under Winthuysen	
1781	American Revolutionary War	21 May	Battle of Blomindon	(Canada)	British	Americans	
1781	American Revolutionary War	30 May	Action of 30 May	(Portugal)	British under Williams and Pakenham	Dutch under Oorthuys and Melvill	
1781	American Revolutionary War	21 July	Naval battle off Cape Breton	(Canada)	French under La Pérouse and Latouche	British convoy	
1781	American Revolutionary War	21 July	Battle of Saldanha Bay	(South Africa)	British under Johnstone	Dutch	
1781	American Revolutionary War	16 Aug	Battle of Dogger Bank		Inconclusive: Dutch under Zoutman vs British under Parker		
1781	American Revolutionary War	2 Sep	Action of 2 September	(United States)	British under Douglas	French	
1781	American Revolutionary War	5 Sep	Battle of the Chesapeake	(United States)	French under de Grasse	British under Graves	
1781	American Revolutionary War	6 Sep	Capture of HMS Savage	(United States)	Americans	British under Stirling	
1781	American Revolutionary War	12 Dec	Second Battle of Ushant	(France)	British under Kempenfelt	French under de Guichen	
1782	American Revolutionary War	15 Jan	Action of 15 January	(Jamaica)	British	Spanish	
1782	American Revolutionary War	25 Jan	Battle of St. Kitts	(Saint Kitts and Nevis)	British under Hood	French under de Grasse	
1782	American Revolutionary War	17 Feb	Battle of Sadras	(India)	Inconclusive: French under Suffren vs British under Hughes		
1782	American Revolutionary War	16 March	Action of 16 March	(Gibraltar)	British under Pole	Spanish	
1782	American Revolutionary War	8 April	Battle of Delaware Bay	(United States)	Americans under Barney	British under Mason and Rogers	
1782	American Revolutionary War	9 and 12 April	Battle of the Saintes	(Dominica)	British under Rodney	French under de Grasse	In the West Indies
1782	American Revolutionary War	12 April	Battle of Providien	(India)	Inconclusive: French under Suffren vs British under Hughes		
1782	American Revolutionary War	16 April	Battle of Porto Praya	(Cape Verde)	Inconclusive: French under Suffren vs British under Johnstone		
1782	American Revolutionary War	19 April	Battle of the Mona Passage		British under Hood	French under Framond	
1782	American Revolutionary War	20-21 April	Battle of Ushant	(France)	British under Barrington, Jervis and Maitland	French	
1782	American Revolutionary War	28-29 May	Battle off Halifax	(Canada)	British	Americans under Ropes	
1782	American Revolutionary War	6 July	Battle of Negapatam	(India)	Inconclusive: French under Suffren vs British under Hughes		
1782	American Revolutionary War	29 July	Action of 29 July	(United States)	Inconclusive: French under Vaudreuil and British under Salter		
1782	American Revolutionary War	12 Aug	Action of 12 August	(Sri Lanka)	Inconclusive: British under Mitchell vs French under Pierrevert		
1782	American Revolutionary War	25 Aug—3 Sep	Battle of Trincomalee	(Sri Lanka)	Inconclusive: Hughes' fleet damages Suffren's but withdraws		
1782	American Revolutionary War	4 Sep	Action of 4 September	(France)	British under Trollope	French	
1782	American Revolutionary War	5 Sep	Action of 5 September	(United States)	Inconclusive: French under Latouche and British		
1782	American Revolutionary War	10 Sep	Action of 10 September	(Malaysia)	Inconclusive: French under Nuguy and the East India Company		
1782	American Revolutionary War	15 Sep	Action of 15 September	(United States)	British under Elphinstone	French under Latouche	
1782	American Revolutionary War	18 Oct	Action of 18 October		Inconclusive: British vs French under Grimouard		
1782	American Revolutionary War	20 Oct	Battle of Cape Spartel		Franco-Spanish fleet under Córdova fights British fleet under Howe		Howe resupplies Gibraltar
1782	American Revolutionary War	30 Nov	Battle of Kedges Strait	(United States)	British	Americans	
1782	American Revolutionary War	6 Dec	Action of 6 December	(Martinique)	British	French under de Borda	
1782	American Revolutionary War	12 Dec	Action of 12 December	(Spain)	British under Luttrell	Americans and French under Baudin	
1782	American Revolutionary War	20-21 Dec	Battle of the Delaware Capes	(United States)	British under Frederick	Americans	
1783	American Revolutionary War	2 Jan	Action of 2 January	(Haiti)	Inconclusive: British under Graves vs French under Kergariou-Locmaria		
1783	American Revolutionary War	22 Jan	Action of 22 January	(United States)	British under Russell	French under Kergariou-Locmaria	
1783	American Revolutionary War	15 Feb	Action of 15 February	(France)	British under Linzee	French	
1783	American Revolutionary War	17 Feb	Action of 17 February	(Cuba) / (Jamaica)	British	French	
1783	American Revolutionary War	11 April	Action of 11 April	(India)	British under Graves	French under Villaret de Joyeuse	
1783	American Revolutionary War	20 June	Battle of Cuddalore	(India)	French under Suffren	British under Hughes	British fail to seize Cuddalore
1783	Spanish-Algerian war	4-8 Aug	Bombardment of Algiers	(Algeria)	Algerines under Mohammed V	Spanish under Barceló	
1784	Spanish-Algerian war	12 July	Bombardment of Algiers	(Algeria)	Algerines under Mohammed V	Spanish-Neapolitan-Maltese-Portuguese under Barceló and Mazarredo	
1787	Russo-Turkish War	30 Aug			Russians vs Turks		
1787	Russo-Turkish War	27-30 Sep			Russians vs Turks		
1787	Russo-Turkish War	15 Oct			Russians	Turks	
1788	Russo-Turkish War	17 June—9 July	Siege of Ochakov	(Russia)	Russians under Nassau-Siegen and Jones	Turkish under Hüseyin Pasha and Hasan Pasha	Land and sea forces clash
1788	Russo-Turkish War	14 July	Battle of Fidonisi	(Ukraine)	Russians under Voinovich	Ottomans under Hasan Pasha	
1788	Russo-Swedish War	17 July	Battle of Hogland		Inconclusive: Swedes under Charles XIII vs Russians under Greig		Strategic victory for Russia
1788	Russo-Turkish War	25 July	Battle of Ochakov	(Russia)	Russians under Potemkin	Turkish under Hüseyin Pasha and Hasan Pasha	
1789		26 May	Action of 26 May	(Algeria)	Portuguese	Algerines	
1789	Russo-Turkish War	2-4 June	Action of 2 June		Russians	Turks	At Sinope
1789	Russo-Swedish War	26 July	Battle of Öland	(Sweden)	Indecisive: Swedish under Charles XIII vs Russians under Chichagov		
1789	Russo-Swedish War	24-25 Aug	Battle of Svensksund	(Finland)	Russians under Nassau-Siegen	Swedes under Ehrensvärd	
1789	Russo-Swedish War	18 Sep		(Finland)	Russians	Swedes	Small battle in Barösund near Ingå
1789	Russo-Swedish War	30 Sep	Battle of Elgsö	(Finland)	Swedes under Armfelt	Russians under Treneven	
1790	Russo-Swedish War	13 May	Battle of Reval	(Estonia)	Russians under Chichagov	Swedes under Charles XIII	Disastrous Swedish attack on Russian battlefleet
1790	Russo-Swedish War	15 May	Battle of Fredrikshamn	(Finland)	Swedes under Gustav III	Russians	
1790	Russo-Turkish War	17-18 May	Battle of Andros	(Greece)	Ottomans and Algerians	Russians under Katsonis	
1790	Russo-Swedish War	3-4 June	Action off Kronstadt	(Finland)	Indecisive: Russia vs Sweden		Russian strategic victory
1790	Russo-Swedish War	2-3 July	Battle of Björkösund	(Russia)	Swedish	Russians under Nassau-Siegen	
1790	Russo-Swedish War	3 July	Battle of Vyborg Bay	(Russia)	Inconclusive: Swedish under Gustav III and Charles XIII and galley vs Russian blockade under Chichagov		Swedish break through the blockade but suffer heavy losses.
1790	Russo-Swedish War	9-10 July	Battle of Svensksund	(Finland)	Swedish under Gustav III and Cronstedt	Russians under Nassau-Siegen	The largest naval battle in the Baltic Sea of all times; extremely heavy losses by Russians
1790	Russo-Turkish War	19 July	Battle of Kerch Strait	(Autonomous Republic of Crimea)	Russians under Ushakov	Turks	Slight victory
1790	Russo-Turkish War	8-9 Sep	Battle of Tendra	(Ukraine)	Russians under Ushakov	Turks	
1790	Russo-Turkish War	31 Oct	Battle of the Sulina	(Romania)	Russians	Turks	At the Sulina mouth
1790	Russo-Turkish War	17-18 Nov	Battle of Tulcea	(Romania)	Russians	Turks	At Tulcea
1790	Russo-Turkish War	29 Nov—7 Dec	Siege of Izmail	(Ukraine)	Russians under Suvorov	Turks under Mehmed Pasha	At Izmail
1791	Russo-Turkish War	9 July	Battle of Măcin	(Romania)	Russians under Repnin	Turkish rowing vessels under Yusuf Pasha	
1791	Russo-Turkish War	11 Aug	Battle of Cape Kaliakra	(Bulgaria)	Russians under Ushakov	Turks	Largely inconclusive battle but slight Russian victory
1791	Spanish-Moroccan War	24 Aug	Bombardment of Tangier	(Morocco)	Morocco	Spain	
1791	Third Anglo-Mysore War	18 Nov	Battle of Tellicherry	(India)	British under Strachan	French	
1793	French Revolutionary Wars	18 June	Action of 18 June	(England)	British under Pellew	French	
1793	French Revolutionary Wars	31 July	Action of 31 July	(United States)	Inconclusive: British vs French under Bompart		
1793	French Revolutionary Wars	29 Aug—19 Dec	Siege of Toulon	(France)	French Republicans under Napoleon	French Royalists	
1793	French Revolutionary Wars	5 Oct	Raid on Genoa	(Italy)	British under Gell	French	
1793	French Revolutionary Wars	20 Oct	Action of 20 October	(France)	British under Saumarez	French	
1793	French Revolutionary Wars	22 Oct	Action of 22 October	(Italy)	Inconclusive: British under Nelson vs French under Perrée		
1793	French Revolutionary Wars	24 Oct	Action of 24 October		French	British	
1794	French Revolutionary Wars	2 Jan—9 Feb	Sunda Strait campaign	(Indonesia)	Inconclusive: French under Reanud attack British convoy		
1794	French Revolutionary Wars	7-20 Feb	Siege of San Fiorenzo	(France)	Anglo-Corsican	French	
1794	French Revolutionary Wars	4 April—22 May	Siege of Bastia	(France)	Anglo-Corsican	French	
1794	French Revolutionary Wars	23 April	Action of 23 April	(Guernsey)	British under Warren	French	
1794	French Revolutionary Wars	5 May	Action of 5 May	(Mauritius)	British	French	
1794	French Revolutionary Wars	7 May	Action of 7 May		British under Boyles	French under Linois	
1794	French Revolutionary Wars	29 May	Frigate action of 29 May	(Spain)	British under Laforey	French	
1794	French Revolutionary Wars	1 June	The Glorious First of June	(France)	British under Howe	French under Villaret de Joyeuse	In North Atlantic; French grain convoy makes it through to Brest
1794	French Revolutionary Wars	8 June		(Jersey)	French vs British		
1794	French Revolutionary Wars	8 June	Action of 8 June	(France)	French under Martin	Sardinians	
1794	French Revolutionary Wars	17 June	Battle of Mykonos	(Greece)	British under Paget	French	
1794	French Revolutionary Wars	17 June—10 Aug	Siege of Calvi	(France)	Anglo-Corsican under Hood, Nelson and Stuart	French under Casabianca	
1794	French Revolutionary Wars	23 Aug		(France)	British	French	Near Brest
1794	French Revolutionary Wars	21 Oct	Action of 21 October	(France)	British under Pellew	French under Thévenard	
1794	French Revolutionary Wars	22 Oct	Battle of Île Ronde	(Mauritius)	Inconclusive: French under Renaud vs British		
1794	French Revolutionary Wars	6 Nov	Action of 6 November		French under Nielly	British under Bligh	French capture HMS Alexander
1794	French Revolutionary Wars	24 Dec 1794—3 Feb 1795	Croisière du Grand Hiver		British under Smith	French under Villaret de Joyeuse	
1795	French Revolutionary Wars	23 Jan	Capture of the Dutch fleet at Den Helder	(Netherlands)	French	Dutch under de Winter	
1795	French Revolutionary Wars	14 Feb	Battle of the Gulf of Roses	(Spain)	Spanish under Lángara	French	
1795	French Revolutionary Wars	8 March	Action of 8 March	(France)	British	French under Lejoille	
1795	French Revolutionary Wars	13-14 March	Battle of Genoa	(Italy)	Anglo-Neapolitans under Hotham	French under Martin	
1795	French Revolutionary Wars	10-11 April	Action of 10 April		British under Colpoys	French	
1795	French Revolutionary Wars	8-18 June	Biscay campaign of June 1795	(France)	British under Cornwallis	French under Vence	Near Belle Île
1795	French Revolutionary Wars	16-17 June	Cornwallis's Retreat	(France)	British under Cornwallis	French under Villaret de Joyeuse	
1795	French Revolutionary Wars	23 June	Battle of Groix	(France)	British under Hood	French under Villaret de Joyeuse	Off Groix
1795	French Revolutionary Wars	24 June	Action of 24 June	(France)	British under Towry	French under Perrée	
1795	French Revolutionary Wars	13 July	Battle of the Hyères Islands	(France)	Anglo-Neapolitans under Hotham and Nelson	French under Martin	
1795	French Revolutionary Wars	22 Aug	Action of 22 August	(Norway)	British under Alms	Batavians	
1795	French Revolutionary Wars	7 Oct	Battle of the Levant Convoy	(Portugal)	French under Richery	British	
1796	French Revolutionary Wars	12 May	Action of 12 May	(Netherlands)	British under Halsted	Batavians	
1796	French Revolutionary Wars	31 May	Action of 31 May	(Spain)	British under Nelson	French	
1796	French Revolutionary Wars	4-22 June	Atlantic raid of June 1796		British under Williams	French	
1796	French Revolutionary Wars	9 Sep	Action of 9 September	(Indonesia)	Inconclusive: British vs French under Sercey		
1796	French Revolutionary Wars	13 Oct	Action of 13 October	(Spain)	British under Bowen	Spanish	
1796	French Revolutionary Wars	19 Dec	Action of 19 December	(Spain)	Inconclusive: British under Nelson and Spanish under Stuart		
1797	French Revolutionary Wars	13-14 Jan	Action of 13 January	(France)	British under Pellew and Reynolds	French under Lacrosse	
1797	French Revolutionary Wars	25 Jan	Action of 25 January	(Spain)	Spanish	British under Lord Garlies	
1797	French Revolutionary Wars	28 Jan	Bali Strait incident	(Indonesia)	British	French under Sercey	
1797	French Revolutionary Wars	14 Feb	Battle of Cape St. Vincent	(Portugal) / (Gibraltar)	British under Jervis	Spanish under Córdoba	Near Gibraltar
1797	French Revolutionary Wars	21 Feb	Invasion of Trinidad	(Trinidad and Tobago)	British under Abercromby	Spanish under Chacón	British occupy Trinidad
1797	French Revolutionary Wars	26 March	Action of 26 March		Austrians and Venetians	French	
1797	French Revolutionary Wars	15-21 April	Battle of Jean-Rabel	(Haiti)	British	French	Part of the Haitian Revolution
1797	French Revolutionary Wars	26 April	Action of 26 April	(Spain)	British under Martin	Spanish	
1797	French Revolutionary Wars	16 May	Action of 16 May	(Libya)	Danish under Bille	Tripolitans under Yusuf Karamanli	Near Tripoli
1797	French Revolutionary Wars	June	Assault on Cádiz (1797)	(Spain)	Spanish under Mazzarredo and Gravina	British under Nelson and Jervis	
1797	French Revolutionary Wars	22-25 July	Battle of Santa Cruz de Tenerife	(Spain)	Spanish under Gutiérrez	British under Nelson	
1797	French Revolutionary Wars	11 Oct	Battle of Camperdown	(Netherlands)	British under Duncan	Dutch under de Winter	
1798	French Revolutionary Wars	Jan	Raid on Manila	(Philippines)	Mixed: British victory in Manila; Spanish victory in Zamboanga		
1798	French Revolutionary Wars	21 April	Battle of the Raz de Sein	(France)	British under Hood	French under Lhéritier	
1798	French Revolutionary Wars	30 May	Action of 30 May	(France)	British under Laforey	French	
1798	French Revolutionary Wars	10-12 June	French invasion of Malta	(Malta)	French under Napoleon	Hospitaller Malta / Navy of the Order of Saint John	
1798	French Revolutionary Wars	27 June	Action of 27 June	(Italy)	British under Foote	French	
1798	French Revolutionary Wars	29-30 June	Action of 30 June	(France)	British under Stirling	French	
1798	French Revolutionary Wars	7 July	Capture of La Croyable	(United States)	Americans under Decatur	French	Americans capture the French schooner La Croyable
1798	French Revolutionary Wars	15 July	Action of 15 July	(Spain)	British under Dixon	Spanish	
1798	French Revolutionary Wars	1-3 Aug	Battle of the Nile	(Egypt)	British under Nelson	Moored French fleet under Brueys	
1798	French Revolutionary Wars	18 Aug	Action of 18 August	(Greece)	French under Lejoille	British under Thompson	
1798	French Revolutionary Wars	2 September – 4 September 1800	Siege of Malta	(Malta)	British under Horatio Nelson, Portugal and Maltese rebels	French under Claude Vaubois	
1798	French Revolutionary Wars	12 Oct	Action of 12 October	(Republic of Ireland)	British under Warren	French invasion force under Bompart	
1798	French Revolutionary Wars	24 Oct	Action of 24 October	(Netherlands)	British under King	Batavians	
1798	French Revolutionary Wars	28 Oct			British vs French		Minor battle
1798	French Revolutionary Wars	14 Dec	Action of 14 December	(France)	French	British	
1799	French Revolutionary Wars	19 Jan	Action of 19 January	(Gibraltar)	Spanish under Mourelle	British	
1799	French Revolutionary Wars	27 Jan	Macau Incident	(China)	Inconclusive: British under Hargood vs French/Spanish under de Álva		Both sides reported the other refused battle
1799	French Revolutionary Wars	6 Feb	Action of 6 February	(Spain)	British under Bowen	Spanish	
1799	French Revolutionary Wars	9 Feb	Action of 9 February		British under Ball	French	
1799	French Revolutionary Wars	9 Feb	USS Constellation vs L'Insurgente	(Saint Kitts and Nevis)	Americans under Truxton	French	
1799	French Revolutionary Wars	28 Feb	Action of 28 February	(India)	British under Cooke	French under Beaulieu	
1799	French Revolutionary Wars	3 Mar	Battle of Qena	(Egypt)	ottoman empire, Arab forces from Hijaz and Egyptian Fellahin	France under Captain Morandi	captain Morandi killed, ship sunk and all on board were killed
1799	French Revolutionary Wars	18 June	Action of 18 June	(France)	British under Lord Keith	French under Perrée	
1799	Napoleonic wars	7 July	Action of 7 July	(Gibraltar)	Spanish	British under Maitland	
1799	War of the Second Coalition	25 July	Battle of Abukir (1799)	(Egypt)	French	Ottomans	
1799	Barbary–Portuguese conflicts	15 Aug	Action of 15 August		Algerines	Portuguese	
1799	French Revolutionary Wars	3, 4, 5, 10 Sep			British vs Spanish		Minor light skirmishes
1799	French Revolutionary Wars	16 Oct	Action of 16 October	(Spain)	British under Pierrepont	Spanish	
1799	French Revolutionary Wars	25 Oct	Cutting out of the Hermione	(Venezuela)	British under Hamilton	Spanish	British recapture their ship HMS Hermione
1799	French Revolutionary Wars	11 Dec	Battle of Port Louis	(Mauritius)	British	French under l'Hermite	

== 19th century ==
=== Early 19th century ===
Year	War	Date	Battle	Loc.	Winners	Losers	Notes
1800	French Revolutionary Wars	1 Jan	Action of 1 January	(Haiti)	Americans	French under Rigaud	
1800	French Revolutionary Wars	1-2 Feb	USS Constellation vs La Vegeance	(Saint Kitts and Nevis)	Inconclusive: Americans under Truxton vs French under Pitot		
1800	French Revolutionary Wars	31 March	Action of 31 March	(Malta)	British under Dixon	French under Decrès	
1800	French Revolutionary Wars	5-7 April	Action of 7 April	(Spain)	British under Duckworth	Spanish	
1800	French Revolutionary Wars	11 May	Battle of Puerto Plata Harbor	(Dominican Republic)	Americans under Talbot and Hull	French-Spanish	
1800	French Revolutionary Wars	7 July	Raid on Dunkirk	(France)	British under Inman	French	
1800	French Revolutionary Wars	22 July—25 Sep	Invasion of Curaçao	(Netherlands)	Batavian-American-British victory	French	
1800	French Revolutionary Wars	4 Aug	Action of 4 August	(Brazil)	British under Meriton	French under Landolphe	
1800	French Revolutionary Wars	12 Oct	USS Boston vs Berceau	(France)	Americans under Little	French under Senez	
1800	French Revolutionary Wars	25 Oct	USS Enterprise vs Flambeau	(Dominica)	Americans under Shaw	French	
1800	Napoleonic Wars	10 Dec	Action of 10 December	(Gibraltar)	Spanish	British	
1801	French Revolutionary Wars	19 Feb	Action of 19 February	(Morocco)	British under Barlow	French	
1801	Napoleonic Wars	3 March	Battle of West Kay	(United States Virgin Islands)	Danish under Jessen	British under Perkins	
1801	French Revolutionary Wars	8 March	Battle of Abukir (1801)	(Egypt)	British	French	
1801	French Revolutionary Wars	21 March	Battle of Alexandria (1801)	(Egypt)	British	French	
1801	French Revolutionary Wars	2 April	First Battle of Copenhagen	(Denmark)	British under Nelson	Danish under Fischer	British destroy moored Danish ships to prevent France taking them over
1801	French Revolutionary Wars	6 May	Action of 6 May	(Spain)	British under Cochrane	Spanish	
1801	French Revolutionary Wars	24 June	Action of 24 June	(Libya)	French under Ganteaume	British under Hallowell	
1801	French Revolutionary Wars	6 July	First Battle of Algeciras	(Spain)	French-Spanish under Linois	British under Saumarez	
1801	French Revolutionary Wars	12-13 July	Second Battle of Algeciras	(Gibraltar)	Anglo-Portuguese under Saumarez	French-Spanish under Linois	
1801	First Barbary War	1 Aug	Action of 1 August	(Libya)	Americans under Sterett	Tripolitanians	
1801	French Revolutionary Wars	4 and 15-16 Aug	Raids on Boulogne	(France)	French under Latouche Tréville	British under Nelson	Failed attempts to destroy French vessels at Boulogne
1801	French Revolutionary Wars	19 Aug	Battle of Mahé	(Seychelles)	British under Adam	French	
1802	First Barbary War	16 May	First Battle of Tripoli Harbor	(Libya)	Inconclusive: Swedish and Americans under Cederström vs Tripolitanians		
1802	Barbary–Portuguese conflicts	27 May	Action of 27 May		Algerines under Raïs Hamidou	Portuguese	
1802	First Barbary War	17 June	Action of 17 June	(Spain)	Tripolitanians	Americans	
1803	Napoleonic Wars	23-24 and 27 May	Action of 23 May		4 ships take on Tripolitan gunboat force		
1803	First Barbary War	31 May—1 June	Action of 31 May		Americans on Adams vs Tripolitan gunboats		
1803	First Barbary War	2 June	Action of 2 June	(Libya)	Tripolitanians	Americans under Porter	
1803	First Barbary War	22 June	Action of 22 June	(Libya)	Americans under Rodgers	Tripolitanians	
1803	Haitian Revolution	28 June	Action of 28 June	(Haiti)	Inconclusive: French under Willaumez vs British under Bayntun		
1803	First Barbary War	31 Oct	Action of 31 October	(Libya)	Tripolitanians	Americans under Porter and Bainbridge	
1803	Napoleonic Wars	18 June—6 Dec	Blockade of Saint-Domingue	(Haiti)	British under Duckworth	French under Rochambeau	Near Santo Domingo
1804	Napoleonic Wars	15 Feb	Battle of Pulo Aura	(Malaysia)	British under Dance	French under Linois	
1804	First Barbary War	7 July	Action of 7 July	(Libya)	Tripolitanians	Americans under Caldwell	
1804	Napoleonic Wars	11 July	Action of 11 July	(France)	British	French	
1804	Napoleonic Wars	3 Aug—10 Sep	Second Battle of Tripoli Harbor	(Morocco)	Tripolitanians	Americans and Sicilians under Preble and Decatur	
1804	Napoleonic Wars	15 Sep	Battle of Vizagapatam	(India)	French under Linois vs British under Lind		
1804	Napoleonic Wars	5 Oct	Action of 5 October	(Portugal)	British under Moore	Spanish under Bustamente	
1804	Napoleonic Wars	25 Nov	Action of 25 November	(Spain)	British under Strachan	Spanish	
1804	Napoleonic Wars	7 Dec	Action of 7 December	(Portugal)	British under Lawford and Hamond	Spanish	
1805	Napoleonic Wars	c. Feb	Action of 1805		French squadron raids British		
1805	French Revolutionary Wars	31 May—2 June	Battle of Diamond Rock	(Martinique)	French and Spanish under Cosmao	British under Maurice	
1805	Napoleonic Wars	4 July	Action of 4 July		2 Russian ships	French gunboat force	
1805	Napoleonic Wars	5 July	Action of 15 July	(France)	French	British	
1805	Napoleonic Wars	18 July	Battle of Blanc-Nez and Gris-Nez	(France)	Dutch and French under Ver Huell	Superior British squadron under Lord Keith	
1805	Napoleonic Wars	22 July	Battle of Cape Finisterre	(Spain)	British under Calder	French under Villeneuve	
1805	Napoleonic Wars	6 Aug	Action of 6 August		Inconclusive: French under Linois vs British under Bissell		French retreat
1805	French Revolutionary Wars	10 Aug	Action of 10 August	(Spain)	British under Baker	French	
1805	Napoleonic Wars	21 Oct	Battle of Trafalgar	(Spain)	British under Nelson	Franco-Spanish fleet under Villeneuve	Nelson gains control of the oceans for Britain for the rest of the war but is killed
1805	Napoleonic Wars	4 Nov	Battle of Cape Ortegal	(Spain)	British under Strachan	French under Pelley	British capture 4 French battleship survivors from Trafalgar
1806	French Revolutionary Wars	8-18 Jan	Battle of Blaauwberg	(South Africa)	British under Baird	Batavians and French under Janssens	British occupy Dutch Cape Colony
1806	Napoleonic Wars	6 Feb	Battle of San Domingo	(Dominican Republic) / (Haiti)	British under Duckworth	French under Leissègues	Off Santo Domingo
1806	French Revolutionary Wars	13 March	Action of 13 March	(Spain)	British under Warren	French under Linois	
1806	Napoleonic Wars	21 April	Action of 21 April	(South Africa)	Inconclusive: French under Bourayne vs British		
1806	Napoleonic Wars	4 July	Action of 4 July	(Croatia)	Russians	French	In Narenta Channel
1806	Napoleonic Wars	9 July	Action of 9 July	(Sri Lanka)	British under Plampin	French under Perroud	
1806	Napoleonic Wars	26 July	Action of 26 July	(Indonesia)	British	Dutch under Aalbers	
1806	Napoleonic Wars	23 Aug	Action of 23 August	(Cuba)	British under Lydiard and Brisbane	Spanish	
1806	Napoleonic Wars	25 Sep	Action of 25 September	(France)	British battleships under Hood	French frigate force under Soleil	
1806	Napoleonic Wars	18 Oct	Action of 18 October	(Indonesia)	British under Rainier	Dutch	
1806	Napoleonic Wars	27 Nov	Raid on Batavia	(Indonesia)	British under Pellew	Dutch	
1807	Napoleonic Wars	19 Feb	Dardanelles operation	(Turkey)	British under Duckworth	Turkish under Selim III	In Dardanelles
1807	Napoleonic Wars	22 May	Battle of the Dardanelles	(Turkey)	Russians under Seniavin	Turkish under Seydi Ali Pasha	Near Cape Janizary
1807	Anglo-Spanish War	2 June	Action of 2 June	(Argentina)	Spanish	British	
1807	Napoleonic Wars	1-2 July	Battle of Athos	(Greece)	Russians under Seniavin	Turkish under Seydi Ali Pasha	In northern Aegean
1807	Napoleonic Wars	15 Aug—7 Sep	Second Battle of Copenhagen	(Denmark)	British under Gambier and Cathcart	Danish under Peymann	
1807	Napoleonic Wars	18 Sep	Raid of Kristiansand	(Norway)	British attack Christiansholm Fortress		
1807	Napoleonic Wars	1 Oct	Capture of the Jeune Richard	(Barbados)	British	French	
1808	Napoleonic Wars	22 March	Battle of Zealand Point	(Denmark)	British under Parker	Danish under Jessen	
1808	Napoleonic Wars	4 April	Action of 4 April	(Spain)	British under Maxwell	Spanish	
1808	Napoleonic Wars	28 April	Battle of Furuholm	(Sweden)	Swedish	Danish under Fisker	
1808	Napoleonic Wars	16 May	Battle of Alvøen	(Norway)	British under Bettesworth vs Danish		
1808	Napoleonic Wars	9 June	Battle of Saltholm	(Denmark)	Danish	British	
1808	Napoleonic Wars	9 June		(Spain)	Spanish	French (Atlas)	Atlas is captured
1808	Napoleonic Wars	9-14 June	Capture of the Rosily Squadron	(Spain)	Spanish	French under Rosily	
1808	Napoleonic Wars	10 Nov	Action of 10 November	(France)	British under Seymour	French under Pinsum	
1809	Napoleonic Wars	22 Jan	Action of 22 January	(France)	British under Pechell	French under Lahalle	
1809	Napoleonic Wars	10 Feb	Action of 10 February		British under Pigot	French under Rousseau	
1809	Napoleonic Wars	24 Feb	Battle of Les Sables-d'Olonne	(France)	British under Stopford	French under Jurien	
1809	Napoleonic Wars	27 Feb	Action of 27 February	(France)	French under Dubourdieu	British	
1809	Napoleonic Wars	6 April	Action of 6 April	(Spain)	British under Seymour	French under Dupotet	
1809	Napoleonic Wars	11-24 April	Battle of the Basque Roads	(France)	British under Gambier	French under Allemand	
1809	Napoleonic Wars	14-17 April	Action of 14–17 April	(Puerto Rico)	British under Cochrane	French under Troude	Near Puerto Rico; French battleship captured
1809	Napoleonic Wars	23 May	Baltic campaign	(Denmark)	Inconclusive: British (Melpomène) vs Danish		Danes withdraw; Melpomène damaged
1809	Napoleonic Wars	31 May	Action of 31 May	(India)	French under Féretier	East India Company	
1809	Napoleonic Wars	14-18 June and 6 July	Actions of 14–18 June and 6 July		British under Mounsey	France	
1809	Napoleonic Wars	25-27 June		(Italy)	British and Sicilians vs French		Near Gulf of Pozzuoli
1809	Piracy in the Persian Gulf	September-December	Persian Gulf campaign of 1809	(United Arab Emirates)	Britain	Emirate of Ras Al Khaimah	
1809	Napoleonic Wars	25 Oct	Battle of Maguelone	(France) / (Spain)	British under Collingwood	French under Baudin	
1809	Napoleonic Wars	18 Nov	Action of 18 November	(Mauritius)	French under Hamelin	British East Indiamen	
1809	Napoleonic Wars	13 Dec	Action of 13 December	(Antigua and Barbuda)	French under Roquebert	British under Shortland	French capture Junon; Shortland killed in battle
1809			Battle of Dawanshan Island	(China)	Pirates	Chinese Navy	confrontation between the Pirate Confederation under Zheng Yi Sao and the Chinese Navy near Dawanshan Dao Island.
1809	Colonization of New Zealand	Dec	Boyd massacre	(New Zealand)	Maori	British brigantine Boyd	Maori Victory
1810	Napoleonic Wars	3 May	Action of 3 May	(Italy)	British under Brenton	French under Cosa	
1810	Napoleonic Wars	3 July	Action of 3 July	(Comoros)	French under Duperré	British East Indiamen under Meriton	In Mozambique Channel
1810	Napoleonic Wars	23 July	Battle of Silda	(Norway)	British under Byron	Danish	
1810	Napoleonic Wars	26 Aug	Battle of Grand Port	(Mauritius)	French under Duperré	British under Pym	At Grand Port
1810	Napoleonic Wars	31 Aug	Engagement off Toulon	(France)	British vs French		Near Toulon
1810	Napoleonic Wars	13 Sep	Action of 13 September	(France)	French under Bouvet	British under Corbet	
1810	Napoleonic Wars	18 Sep	Action of 18 September	(France)	British under Gordon and Rowley	French under Hamelin	
1810	Napoleonic Wars	15 Nov	Action of 15 November	(France)	British under Malcolm	French	
1811	Argentine War of Independence	2 March	Battle of San Nicolás	(Argentina)	Spanish	Argentines under Azopardo	
1811	Napoleonic Wars	13 March	Battle of Lissa	(Croatia)	British under Hoste	Larger Franco-Venetian squadron under Dubordieu	Off Lissa in the Adriatic Sea
1811	Napoleonic Wars	24-25 March	Action of 24 March	(France)	British under Macnamara	French	
1811		March	Battle of Khakeekera	(Qatar)	Bahrainis/Kuwaitis under Al Khalifa and Al-Sabah	Saudis under al-Jalhami and Ibn Ufaysan	
1811	Pre-War of 1812	16 May	Little Belt affair	(United States)	Americans under Rodgers	British under Bingham	
1811	Napoleonic Wars	20 May	Battle of Tamatave	(Madagascar)	British under Schomberg	French under Roquebert	
1811		22 May	Action of 22 May	(Tunisia)	Algerines under Hamidou ben Ali	Tunisians	
1811	Maritime fur trade	15-16 June	Battle of Woody Point	(Canada)	Nuu-chah-nulth	Pacific Fur Company under Thorn	Tonquin is destroyed
1811	Napoleonic Wars	31 July	Action of 31 July	(Indonesia)	British under Maunsell	French	
1811	Napoleonic Wars	29 Nov	Action of 29 November	(Croatia)	British under Maxwell	French under Montfort	
1812	Napoleonic Wars	3 Feb	Action of 3 February	(Haiti)	British under Yeo	Haitians	
1812	Napoleonic Wars	22 Feb	Battle of Pirano	(Slovenia)	British under Talbot	French under Barré	British capture Rivoli
1812	French Revolutionary Wars	9-29 March	Allemand's escape from Lorient	(France)	French under Allemand	British under Gore	
1812	Napoleonic Wars	22 May	Action of 22 May	(France)	British under Hotham	French under Féretier	
1812	Napoleonic Wars	12 July	Battle of Lyngør	(Norway)	British	Danish under Holm	
1812	War of 1812	19 July	First Battle of Sacket's Harbor	(United States)	Americans	British under Woolsey	
1812	War of 1812	13 Aug	USS Essex vs HMS Alert		Americans under Porter	British	Alert became the first American capture of the war
1812	War of 1812	19 Aug	USS Constitution vs HMS Guerriere		Americans under Hull	British under Dacres	
1812	War of 1812	18 Oct	Capture of HMS Frolic		Inconclusive: Americans under Jones vs British		
1812	War of 1812	25 Oct	USS United States vs HMS Macedonian		Americans under Decatur	British under Carden	
1812	War of 1812	10 Nov	Battle of Kingston Harbour	(Canada)	Inconclusive: Americans under Chauncey vs British		
1812	War of 1812	11 Dec	Battle of La Guaira	(Venezuela)	Americans under Wooster	British	
1813	Napoleonic Wars	7 Feb	Action of 7 February	(Guinea)	Inconclusive: British under Irby vs Bouvet		
1813	War of 1812	24 Feb	Sinking of HMS Peacock	(Guyana)	Americans under Lawrence	British	
1813	War of 1812	3 April	Battle of Rappahannock River	(United States)	British	Americans under Stafford	
1813	Mexican War of Independence	16 April	Battle of Salvatierra	(Mexico)			
1813	War of 1812	28 May	Action off James Island	(Ecuador)	Americans under Downes	British	
1813	War of 1812	28-29 May	Second Battle of Sacket's Harbor	(United States)	Americans under Brown	British under Prevost	
1813	War of 1812	1 June	Battle of Boston Harbor	(United States)	British under Broke	Americans under Lawrence	
1813	War of 1812	14 July	Action off Charles Island	(Ecuador)	Americans under Porter	British	
1813	War of 1812	5 Aug	Capture of HMS Dominica	(Bermuda)	Americans	British	
1813	War of 1812	5 Sep	Capture of HMS Boxer	(United States)	Americans under Burrows	British under Blyth	
1813	War of 1812	10 Sep	Battle of Lake Erie	(United States)	Americans under Perry	British under Barclay	Americans gain control of the lake for the rest of the war
1813	War of 1812	25 Oct	Nuku Hiva Campaign	(Marquesas Islands)	US	Tai Pī (province)	American tactical victory but strategic defeat
1813	Napoleonic Wars	5 Nov	Action of 5 November	(France)	Inconclusive: British under Pellew vs French under Cosmao		Near Toulon
1813	Creek war	12 Nov	Canoe Fight	(United States)	Americans under Dale	Creeks	
1814	Argentine War of Independence	10-15 March	Battle of Martín García	(Uruguay)	Argentines under Brown	Spanish under Romarate	
1814	Napoleonic Wars	26-27 March	Battle of Jobourg	(France)	British under Seymour and Palmer	French under Philibert and du Petit-Thouars	
1814	War of 1812	28 March	Battle of Valparaíso	(Chile)	British under Hillyar	Americans under Porter	
1814	War of 1812	28 April	Capture of HMS Epervier	(United States)	Americans under Warrington	British	
1814	War of 1812	6 May	Battle of Fort Oswego	(United States)	British under Yeo	Americans under Mitchell	
1814	Argentine War of Independence	14-17 May	Battle of Buceo	(Uruguay)	Argentines under Brown	Spanish	Off Montevideo
1814	War of 1812	28 June	Sinking of HMS Reindeer		Americans under Blakely	British	
1814	War of 1812	1 Sep	Sinking of HMS Avon		Americans under Blakely	British under Arbuthnot	
1814	War of 1812	3 Sep	Battle of Hampden	(United States)	British under Barrie and Sherbrooke	Americans under Morris	
1814	War of 1812	6-11 Sep	Battle of Plattsburgh	(United States)	Americans under Macdonough	British under George Downie	
1814	War of 1812	26-27 Sep	Battle of Fayal	(Portugal)	Americans under Reid	British	
1814	War of 1812	14 Dec	Battle of Lake Borgne	(United States)	British under Jones	Americans	
1815	War of 1812	15 Jan	Capture of USS President	(United States)	British under Hayes	Americans under Decatur	
1815	War of 1812	20 Feb	Capture of HMS Cyane and HMS Levant	(Cape Verde)	Americans under Stewart	British under Falcon and Douglas	
1815	War of 1812	23 March	Capture of HMS Penguin	(Saint Helena, Ascension and Tristan da Cunha)	Americans under Biddle	British	
1815	Second Barbary War	17 June	Battle off Cape Gata	(Spain)	Americans under Decatur	Algerines under Raïs Hamidou	
1815	Second Barbary War	19 June	Battle of Cape Palos	(Spain)	Americans under Decatur	Algerines	Final battle of the war
1815	War of 1812	30 June	Capture of East India Company ship Nautilus	(Indonesia)	Americans under Warrington	East India Company	
1816		27 Aug	Bombardment of Algiers	(Algeria)	Anglo-Dutch under Pellew	Algerines under Agha	
1817	Venezuelan War of Independence	8 July	Battle of Pagallos	(Venezuela)	Venezuelan Patriots	Spanish	
1819	Piracy in the Persian Gulf	3 November — 22 December	Persian Gulf campaign of 1819	(United Arab Emirates)	British	Al Qasimi	British victory, Signing of the General Maritime Treaty of 1820.
1820	Peruvian War of Independence	5-6 Nov	Capture of the frigate Esmeralda	(Peru)	Chileans under Cochrane	Spanish	
1821	Greek War of Independence	4 March	Action of 4 march	(Greece)	Greeks vs Turks		North-west of Zakynthos
1822	Greek War of Independence	18 June	Burning of the Ottoman flagship off Chios	(Greece)	Greek under Kanaris	Ottomans under Ali Pasha	Ali Pasha killed when Greeks blow up his flagship
1822	Greek War of Independence	20-25 Sep	Battle of Nauplia	(Greece)	Greeks under Miaoulis	Ottomans under Mehmet Pasha	
1822	Piracy in the Caribbean	9 Nov	Action of 9 November	(Cuba)	Inconclusive: Americans under Allen vs Pirates		
1823	Brazilian War of Independence	7-9 Jan	Battle of Itaparica	(Brazil)	Brazilians	Portuguese	
1823	Brazilian War of Independence	4 May	Battle of 4 May	(Brazil)	Brazilians under Cochrane vs Portuguese		
1823	Venezuelan War of Independence	24 July	Battle of Lake Maracaibo	(Venezuela)	Brazilians under Cochrane vs Portuguese		
1823	Greek War of Independence	27 Sep		(Greece)	Greeks vs Turks		West of Lemnos
1823	Brazilian War of Independence	21 Oct	Battle of Montevideo	(Uruguay)	Brazilians	Portuguese	
1823	Greek War of Independence	23 Oct		(Greece)	Greeks vs Turks		Near Pondikonisi
1824	Greek War of Independence	5-17 Aug	Battle of Samos	(Greece)	Greeks under Sachtouris	Ottomans under Hüsrev Pasha	
1824	Greek War of Independence	1 Sep	First Battle of Budrum	(Turkey)	Greeks vs Turks and Egyptians		
1824	Greek War of Independence	9 Sep	Battle of Gerontas	(Greece)	Greeks under Miaoulis and Papanikolis	Ottomans under Mehmed Pasha	
1824	Greek War of Independence	22 Sep	Action of 22 September	(Greece)	Greeks vs Egyptians near Nikaria		
1824	Greek War of Independence	13 Nov	Action of 13 November	(Greece)	Greeks vs Turks and Egyptians near Spinalonga		
1825	Piracy in the Caribbean	5 March	Capture of the sloop Anne		Danes, Spanish and Americans vs Pirates under Corfresí		
1825	Greek War of Independence	15 April 1825—10 April 1826	Third siege of Missolonghi	(Greece)	Egyptians and Ottomans under Ibrahim Pasha	Greeks	
1825	Greek War of Independence	19 April	Battle of Kremmydi	(Greece)	Egyptians under Ibrahim Pasha		
1825	Greek War of Independence	8 May	Battle of Sphacteria	(Greece)	Egyptians under Ibrahim Pasha	Greeks under Tsamados	
1825	Greek War of Independence	20 May	Battle of Maniaki	(Greece)	Egyptians under Ibrahim Pasha	Greeks under Papaflessas	
1825	Greek War of Independence	1 June	Battle of Andros	(Greece)	Greeks under Sachtouris	Ottomans under Hüsrev Pasha	Between Euboea and Andros
1825	Sardinian-Tripolitanian war of 1825	26-27 Sep	Battle of Tripoli	(Libya)	Sardinians under Sivori	Tripolitanians under Karamanli	
1826	Cisplatine War	9 Feb	Battle of Punta Colares	(Argentina)	Brazil vs Argentines under Brown		
1826	Slave rebellions in the US	April	Decatur slave-ship mutiny	(United States)	Slaves	Slave traders	
1826	Cisplatine War	11 June	Battle of Los Pozos	(Argentina)	11 Argentine vessels under Brown	31 Brazilian vessels	Near Buenos Aires
1826	Greek War of Independence	27-28 July		(Greece)	Greeks vs Turks		Near Samos
1826	Cisplatine War	29-30 July	Battle of Quilmes	(Argentina)	Brazilians under Norton	Argentines under Brown	
1826	Greek War of Independence	10-11 Sep		(Greece)	Greeks vs Turks		Near Mitylene
1826	Greek War of Independence	6-7 Oct			Greeks vs Turks		In Aegean Sea
1827	Cisplatine War	9 Feb	Battle of Juncal	(Uruguay)	15 Argentines ships under Brown	17 Brazilians under Pereira	
1827	Cisplatine War	24 Feb		(Argentina)	Argentines under Brown vs Brazilians		Near Quilmes
1827	Cisplatine War	7-8 April	Battle of Monte Santiago	(Argentina)	Brazilians under Norton	Argentines under Brown	South of Buenos Aires
1827	Greek War of Independence	30 Sep	Battle of Itea	(Greece)	Greeks under Hastings	Turks	In Salona Bay
1827	Greek War of Independence	16 Oct	Battle of Doro Passage	(Greece)	Americans	Greek pirates	
1827	Greek War of Independence	20 Oct	Battle of Navarino	(Greece)	British, French and Russian under Codrington, de Rigny and van Heiden	Turkish, Egyptians and Tunisians	
1828	Greek War of Independence	31 Jan	Action at Grambusa	(Greece)	British and French	Greek pirates	At Grambusa
1828	Spanish colonial campaigns	10-11 Feb	Battle of Mariel	(Cuba)	Spanish under Pérez	Mexicans	
1828	Greek War of Independence	9 June		(Romania)	Russians	Turks	Near Brăila; part of the Russo-Turkish War
1828	Tripolitanian-Neapolitan War	23-29 Aug	Bombardment of Tripoli	(Libya)	Tripolitanians under Karamanli	Sicilians	
1828	Gran Colombia–Peru War	31 Aug	Battle of Punta Malpelo	(Ecuador)	Peruvians	Colombians	
1828	Gran Colombia–Peru War	22-24 Nov	Battle of Cruces	(Ecuador)	Peruvians under Guisse	Colombians under Wright	
1829	Liberal Wars	11 Aug	Battle of Praia da Vitória	(Portugal)	Portuguese liberals under Terceira	Miguelists	
1830	Suppression of the African slave trade	7 Sep	Capture of the Veloz Passagera	(São Tomé and Príncipe)	British	Slave trader	
1830	Belgian Revolution	27 Oct	Bombardment of Antwerp	(Belgium)	Dutch under Chassé	Belgians	
1831	Liberal Wars	11 July	Battle of the Tagus	(Portugal)	French under Roussin	Portuguese Miguelists	
1832	Suppression of the African slave trade		Capture of the brig Brillante		British	Slave trader	Slave trader murders 600 enslaved Africans on board the Brillante before being captured by the British
1833	Liberal Wars	5 July	Battle of Cape St. Vincent	(Portugal)	Portuguese under Napier	Portuguese Miguelites	

=== Mid 19th century ===
Year	War	Date	Battle	Loc.	Winners	Losers	Notes
1836	Texas Revolution	3 April	Action of April 3	(Mexico)	Texans	Mexicans	
1837	Post-Texas Revolution	17 April	Action of April 17	(United States)	Mexicans	Texans	
1837	Post-Texas Revolution	26 Aug	Battle of Galveston Harbor	(United States)	Mexicans	Texans	
1838	War of the Confederation	24 Nov	Battle of Callao	(Peru)	Peruvians vs Confederates		
1838	Pastry War	27 Nov—5 Dec	Battle of Veracruz	(Mexico)	French under Baudin	Mexicans under Santa Anna and Arista	Veracruz briefly taken by French
1839	War of the Confederation	4 Jan	Battle of Casma	(Peru)	Chileans under Simpson	Peruvians	
1839		10 July	Laplace affair	(United States)	French under Laplace	Hawai'i under Kamehameha III	Kamehameha III agrees to decree the Edict of Toleration
1839	First Opium War	4 Sep	Battle of Kowloon	(China)	Stalemate between British under Elliot and Chinese under Lai		
1839	First Opium War	3 Nov	Battle of Chuenpi	(China)	British under Elliot	Chinese under Lin	
1840	First Opium War	10 Oct	Battle of Chinhai	(China)	British under Gough	Chinese	
1841	First Opium War	23-26 Feb	Battle of the Bogue	(China)	British under Bremer	Chinese under Guan	
1841	First Opium War	27 Feb	Battle of First Bar	(China)	British under Herbert	Chinese	
1841	First Opium War	29 Sep—1 Oct	Capture of Chusan	(China)	British under Gough and Parker	Chinese under Ge	
1841	Slave rebellions in the US	Nov	Creole mutiny	(United States) / (The Bahamas)	Slaves	Slave traders	brig was seized by slaves and got to Nassau, The Bahamas where slavery was abolished.
1842	First Opium War	16 June	Battle of Woosung	(China)	British under Gough	Chinese under Chen	
1843	Texas-Mexican Wars	30 April—16 May	Naval Battle of Campeche	(Mexico)	Draw: Texans under Moore vs Mexicans under Marín		
1844	Dominican War of Independence	15 April	Battle of Tortuguero	(Dominican Republic)	Dominicans under Cambiaso	Haitians	
1844	Franco-Moroccan War	6 Aug	Bombardment of Tangier	(Morocco)	French under d'Orléans	Moroccans	
1844	Franco-Moroccan War	15-17 Aug	Bombardment of Mogador	(Morocco)	French under d'Orléans	Moroccans	
1845	Uruguayan Civil War	20 Nov	Battle of Obligado	(Argentina)	British and French under Tréhouart and Inglefield	Argentines under Mansilla	British and French force passage of Paraná River as part of the larger Anglo-French blockade of the Río de la Plata
1847		15 April	Bombardment of Tourane	(Vietnam)	French	Vietnamese under Nguyễn	
1849		March	Rio Nuñez incident	(Guinea)	French and Belgians	Guineans and British	
1849	First Schleswig War	3 May		(Germany)	Schleswig-Holstein vs Denmark		Near Kiel
1849	First Schleswig War	11 May		(Germany)	Schleswig-Holstein vs Denmark		Near Bulk, Kiel
1849	First Schleswig War	4 June	Battle of Heligoland	(Germany)	Stalemate: Germans vs Danish		
1849	First Schleswig War	5 April	Battle of Eckernförde	(Germany)	Schleswig-Holstein	Denmark	Near Kiel
1849	Piracy in Asia	20-22 Oct	Battle of Tonkin River	(Vietnam)	British, Chinese and Vietnamese under Hay	Pirates under Shap-ng-tsai	
1851	Franco–Moroccan conflicts	26-27 Sep	Bombardment of Salé	(Morocco)	Mixed: French military victory under Henri and Moroccan political victory under Abd al-Rahman		
1851	Platine War	17 Dec	Battle of the Tonelero Pass	(Argentina)	Inconclusive: Brazilians under Grenfell vs Argentines under Mansilla		Both parties reached their intended destination
1853	Piracy in Asia	10 May	Battle of Nam Quan	(China)	Inconclusive: Anglo-Chinese vs Chinese Pirates		
1853	Crimean War	30 Nov	Battle of Sinop	(Turkey)	Russians under Nakhimov	Turkish under Osman Pasha	
1854	Crimean War	22 April	1854 bombardment of Odessa	(Russia)	British and French under Dundas	Russians under Osten-Sacken	
1854	Crimean War	7 June	Skirmish of Halkokari	(Russia)	Russians and Finnish	British under Plumridge	
1854		13 July	Bombardment of Greytown	(Nicaragua)	Americans under Hollins	British and Nicaraguans	Monroe Doctrine is enforced
1854	Crimean War	3-16 Aug	Battle of Bomarsund	(Finland)	British and French under Napier	Russians	
1854	Crimean War	30 Aug-5 Sep	Siege of Petropavlovsk	(Russia)	Russians under Putyatin	British and French under Despointes and Price	
1854	Crimean War	Oct	Siege of Sevastopol	(Ukraine)	Allied (British, French and Turkish)	Russians and Greeks	
1855	Crimean War	25 May—2 Nov	Sea of Azov naval campaign	(Russia)	British and French	Russians	
1855	Piracy in Asia	4 Aug	Battle of Ty-ho Bay	(China)	British and Americans	Chinese Pirates	
1855	Crimean War	9-11 Aug	Bombardment of Sveaborg	(Finland)	Inconclusive: British and French under Dundas and Pénaud vs Russians		
1855	Piracy in Asia	19 Aug	Battle of the Leotung	(China)	British	Chinese Pirates	
1855	Crimean War	17 Oct	Battle of Kinburn	(Ukraine)	British and French under Bruat and Lyons	Russian coastal defenses	
1856		7 Aug	Battle of Tres Forcas	(Morocco)	Moroccans	Prussians under Prince Adalbert	
1856		26 Sep	Bombardment of Tourane	(Vietnam)	Inconclusive: French vs Vietnamese		
1856	Second Opium War	23 Oct—5 Nov	Battle of Canton	(China)	British under Seymour	Chinese under Ye	
1856	Second Opium War	6 Nov	Capture of the French Folly Fort	(China)	British under Seymour	Chinese under Ye	
1856	Second Opium War	12-13 Nov	Battle of the Bogue	(China)	British under Seymour	Chinese under Ye	
1856	Second Opium War	16-24 Nov	Battle of the Barrier Forts	(China)	Americans under Armstrong and Foote	Chinese under Ye	
1857	Second Opium War	25-27 May	Battle of Escape Creek	(China)	British under Elliot	Chinese	
1857		26 June	Ningpo massacre	(China)	Chinese pirates	Portuguese	
1858	Cochinchina campaign	1 Sep 1858—22 March 1860	Siege of Tourane	(Vietnam)	Vietnamese under Nguyễ	French and Spanish under de Genouilly and Page	
1859	Cochinchina campaign	18 Feb 1859—25 Feb 1861	Siege of Saigon	(Vietnam)	French and Spanish under de Genouilly	Vietnamese	
1860	Reform War	6 March	Battle of Antón Lizardo	(Mexico)	Americans and Mexican liberals	Spanish and Mexican conservatives	
1861	Cochinchina Campaign	12 April	Capture of Mỹ Tho	(Vietnam)	French and Spanish under Page	Vietnamese	
1861	American Civil War	12-13 April	Battle of Fort Sumter	(United States)	Confederates under Beauregard	Union under Anderson	First battle of the war
1861	American Civil War	7 May	Battle of Gloucester Point	(United States)	Inconclusive: Union under Selfridge and Confederacy-aligned Virginians under Taliaferro		
1861	American Civil War	18-19 May	Battle of Sewell's Point	(United States)	Confederates under Gwynn	Union under Eagle	
1861	American Civil War	29 May—1 June	Battle of Aquia Creek	(United States)	Inconclusive: Union under Ward and Confederates under Ruggles		First use of naval mines by Confederacy
1861	American Civil War	5 June	Battle of Pig Point	(United States)	Confederates	Union	
1861	American Civil War	27 June	Battle of Mathias Point	(United States)	Confederates under Ruggles	Union under Ward	
1861	American Civil War	28 July	Sinking of the Petrel	(United States)	Union	Confederates	Last naval battle involving a privateer ship
1861	American Civil War	28-29 Aug	Battle of Hatteras Inlet Batteries	(United States)	Union under Stringham	Confederates under Barron	
1861	American Civil War	5 Oct	Battle of Cockle Creek	(United States)	Union under Murray	Confederates	
1861	American Civil War	12 Oct	Battle of the Head of Passes	(United States)	Confederates under Hollins	Union under Pope	First deployment of an ironclad warship into battle
1861	American Civil War	3-7 Nov	Battle of Port Royal	(United States)	Union under Du Pont and Sherman	Confederates under Drayton	First major clash between Union and Confederate fleets
1861	American Civil War	8 Nov	Trent Affair		Union under Wilkes	Confederates under Mason and Slidell	Union intercepts Confederate ships on a diplomatic mission to Britain but Lincoln releases the envoys to avoid war with the British
1861	Cochinchina Campaign	16 Dec	Capture of Biên Hòa	(Vietnam)	French and Spanish	Vietnamese	
1862	American Civil War	3 Jan	Battle of Cockpit Point	(United States)	Inconclusive: Union under Wyman vs Confederates		
1862	American Civil War	11 Jan	Battle of Lucas Bend	(United States)	Inconclusive: Union under Foote and Grant vs Confederates		First deployment of Union ironclads
1862	American Civil War	6 Feb	Battle of Fort Henry	(United States)	Union under Foote and Grant	Confederates under Tilghman	
1862	American Civil War	10 Feb	Battle of Elizabeth City	(United States)	Union under Rowan	Confederates under Lynch	
1862	American Civil War	28 Feb—8 April	Battle of Island Number Ten	(United States)	Union under Foote and Pope	Confederates under McCown and Mackall	First Confederate defeat on the Mississippi River
1862	American Civil War	8-9 March	Battle of Hampton Roads	(United States)	Inconclusive: Union under Marston and Worden vs Confederates under Buchanan and Jones		First battle between ironclad warships
1862	American Civil War	14 March	Batle of New Bern	(United States)	Union under Burnside	Confederates under Branch	
1862	Cochinchina campaign	22 March	Capture of Vĩnh Long	(Vietnam)	French and Spanish under Bonard	Vietnamese	
1862	American Civil War	8-28 April	Battle of Forts Jackson and St. Philip	(United States)	Americans under Farragut	Confederates under Duncan	Union captures New Orleans
1862	American Civil War	10-11 April	Siege of Fort Pulaski	(United States)	Union under Du Pont	Confederates under Tattnall	After a 112-day siege on Tybee Island, the Union captures the Confederate-held Fort Pulaski
1862	American Civil War	10 May	Battle of Plum Point Bend	(United States)	Confederates	Union under Davis	
1862	American Civil War	15 May	Drewry's Bluff	(United States)	Confederates under Farrand	Union under Rodgers	
1862	American Civil War	6 June	First Battle of Memphis	(United States)	Union under Davis and Ellet	Confederates under Montgomery	Destruction of Confederate river fleet by Union gunboats
1862	American Civil War	17 June	Battle of St. Charles	(United States)	Union under Fitch and Kilty	Confederates under Fry	
1862	American Civil War	30 June—1 July	Battle of Tampa	(United States)	Confederates under Pearson	Union	
1862	American Civil War	12-18 Aug	Battle of Corpus Christi	(United States)	Mixed: Union tactical victory and Confederate strategic victory under Hobby		
1862	American Civil War	24-25 Sep	First Battle of Sabine Pass	(United States)	Union under Crocker	Confederates under Irvine	
1862	American Civil War	3 Oct	Battle of Crumpler's Bluff	(United States)	Confederates	Union	
1862	American Civil War	4 Oct	Battle of Galveston Harbor	(United States)	Union under Renshaw	Confederates under Cook	
1863	American Civil War	1 Jan	Battle of Galveston	(United States)	Confederates under Smith	Union under Renshaw	
1863	American Civil War	9-11 Jan	Battle of Fort Hindman	(United States)	Union under Porter	Confederates	Largest surrender of Confederate troops West of the Mississippi
1863	Second French intervention in Mexico	10-12 Jan	First Battle of Acapulco	(Mexico)	French	Mexican Republicans and Americans	
1863	American Civil War	11 Jan	Action off Galveston Light	(United States)	Confederates under Semmes	Union under Blake	
1863	American Civil War	27 Jan—3 March	Battle of Fort McAllister	(United States)	Confederates	Union under Du Pont	
1863	American Civil War	11 March	Yazoo Pass expedition	(United States)	Confederates	Union	
1863	American Civil War	7 April	First Battle of Charleston Harbor	(United States)	Confederates under Beauregard	Union under Du Pont	Union fails to capture Charleston
1863	American Civil War	29 April	Battle of Grand Gulf	(United States)	Confederates under Bowen	Union under Porter	
1863	American Civil War	17 June	Battle of Wassaw Sound	(United States)	Union under Rodgers	Confederates under Web	
1863	American Civil War	27 June	Battle of Portland Harbor	(United States)	Union	Confederates under Read	
1863	American Civil War	10-11 July	First Battle of Fort Wagner	(United States)	Confederates under Beauregard	Union under Dahlgren	
1863	Bakumatsu	16 July	Battle of Shimonoseki Straits	(Japan)	Americans under McDougal	Japanese under Mōri	
1863	American Civil War	18 July	Second Battle of Fort Wagner	(United States)	Confederates under Beauregard	Union under Dahlgren	
1863	American Civil War	18 July—7 Sep	Second Battle of Charleston Harbor	(United States)	Inconclusive: Confederates under Beauregard and Union under Dahlgren		
1863	Bakumatsu	15-17 Aug	Bombardment of Kagoshima	(Japan)	Japanese under Shimazu	British under Kuper	
1863	American Civil War	7-8 Sep	Second Battle of Fort Sumter	(United States)	Confederates under Beauregard	Union under Gillmore	
1863	American Civil War	8 Sep	Second Battle of Sabine Pass	(United States)	Confederates under Smith	Union under Crocker	Most one-sided Confederate victory of the war
1863	American Civil War	5 Oct	Attack on USS New Ironsides	(United States)	Confederates under Rowan	Union under Glassell	CSS David becomes first torpedo boat to make a successful attack on an enemy warship
1863	American Civil War	16-18 Oct	Battle of Fort Brooke	(United States)	Union under Semmes	Confederates under Westcott	
1864	American Civil War	17 Feb	Sinking of USS Housatonic	(United States)	Confederates under Dixon	Union under Pickering	Confederate submarine H. L. Hunley becomes the first submarine to sink a warship in combat
1864	Second French intervention in Mexico	27 Feb	Battle of San Juan Bautista	(Mexico)	Mexican Republicans	French and Mexicans	
1864	Second Schleswig War	Feb	Battle of Eckernfjorde	(Germany)	Prussia	Danes	
1864	Second Schleswig War	17 March	Jasmund	(Germany)	Danes under van Dockum	Prussians under von Jachmann	
1864	American Civil War	17-20 April	Battle of Plymouth	(United States)	Confederates under Hoke	Union under Wessells	
1864	American Civil War	5 May	Battle of Albemarle Sound	(United States)	Inconclusive: Union under Smith vs Confederates under Cooke		
1864	Second Schleswig War	9 May	Battle of Helgoland	(Germany)	Danes under Suenson	Prussians and Austrians under von Tegetthoff	In the North Sea
1864	Second French intervention in Mexico	3 June	Second Battle of Acapulco	(Mexico)	French	Mexican Republicans and Americans	
1864	American Civil War	19 June	Battle of Cherbourg	(France)	Union under Winslow	Confederates under Semmes	USS Kearsarge sinks CSS Alabama
1864	Second Schleswig War	12-20 July	Capture of the North Frisian Islands	(Germany)	Austrians and Prussians under von Wüllerstorf-Urbair	Danes under Hammer	
1864	American Civil War	2-23 Aug	Battle of Mobile Bay	(United States)	Union under Farragut	Confederates under Buchanan	Largest Union naval victory of the war
1864	American Civil War	7 Oct	Bahia incident	(Brazil)	Union under Collins	Confederates and Brazilians	USS Wachusett captures CSS Florida in Brazilian waters, sparking an international incident
1864	American Civil War	29-31 Oct	Capture of Plymouth	(United States)	Union under Cushing	Confederates	
1864	Paraguayan War	12 Nov	Capture of the steamer Marquês de Olinda	(Paraguay)	Paraguayans under López	Brazilians	
1864	American Civil War	9 Dec	Rainbow Bluff Expedition	(United States)	Confederates	Union	
1865	American Civil War	13-15 Jan	Second Battle of Fort Fisher	(United States)	Union under Porter	Confederates	Largest amphibious assault of the war
1865	American Civil War	23-25 Jan	Battle of Trent's Reach	(United States)	Union	Confederates	Final naval action of the war
1865	Paraguayan War	11 June	Battle of Riachuelo	(Argentina)	Brazilians under Barroso	Paraguayans under Meza	In Paraná River
1865	Paraguayan War	11 Aug	Battle of Paso de Mercedes	(Argentina)	Brazilians under Barroso	Paraguayans under Bruguez	
1865	Paraguayan War	12 Aug	Battle of Paso de Cuevas	(Argentina)	Brazilians and Argentines under Barroso	Paraguayans under Bruguez	
1865	Second French intervention in Mexico	11 Sep	Third Battle of Acapulco	(Mexico)	French and Mexicans	Mexican Republicans	
1865	Chincha Islands War	17 Nov	Action of 17 November	(Chile)	Chileans	Spanish	
1865	Chincha Islands War	26 Nov	Battle of Papudo	(Chile)	Chileans under Rebolledo	Spanish	
1865	Paraguayan War		Battle of Corrientes	(Argentina)	Triple Alliance	Paraguayans	
1866	Chincha Islands War	7 Feb	Battle of Abtao	(Chile)	Inconclusive: Spain vs Peru/Chile		
1866	Chincha Islands War	6 March	Capture of the Paquete de Maule	(Chile)	Spanish under Topete	Chileans	
1866	Chincha Islands War	31 March	Bombardment of Valparaíso	(Chile)	Spanish under Méndez	Chileans	
1866	Paraguayan War	16 April	Battle of Paso de Patria	(Paraguay)	Triple Alliance under Lisboa	Paraguayans	
1866	Chincha Islands War	2 May	Battle of Callao	(Peru)	Inconclusive: Spanish under Méndez vs Peruvians under Prado		
1866	Third Italian War of Independence	25 June—26 July	Battle of Lake Garda	(Italy)	Austrians	Italians	
1866	Third Italian War of Independence	20 July	Battle of Lissa	(Croatia)	Austrians under von Tegetthoff	Superior Italian fleet under Persano	
1866	Pre-Korean Expedition	9 Aug—2 Sep	General Sherman incident	(North Korea)	Koreans	Americans	
1866	Chincha Islands War	22 Aug	Action of 22 August	(Portugal)	Spanish	Chileans	

=== Late 19th century ===
Year	War	Date	Battle	Loc.	Winners	Losers	Notes
1868	Boshin War	28 Jan	Battle of Awa	(Japan)	Tokugawa shogunate under Enomoto	Satsumas	
1868	Paraguayan War	13 Feb	Passage of Curupayty	(Paraguay)	Brazilians under Carvalho	Paraguayans under López	
1868	Paraguayan War	2 March	Assault on the battleships Cabral and Lima Barros	(Paraguay)	Brazilians	Paraguayans	
1868	Paraguayan War	9 July	Assault on the battleships Barroso and Rio Grande	(Paraguay)	Brazilians under Mota	Paraguayans	
1869	Boshin War	4-10 May	Naval Battle of Hakodate	(Japan)	Japanese	Republic of Ezo under Arai	
1869	Boshin War	6 May	Battle of Miyako Bay	(Japan)	Japanese	Republic of Ezo under Arai	
1870	Piracy in North America	17 June	Battle of Boca Teacapan	(Mexico)	Americans under Brownson	Mexican pirates under Vega y Daza	
1870	Franco-Prussian War	17 July	Action off Zealand	(Netherlands)	Inconclusive: North Germans (SMS Grille) vs French blockade		Neither side inflicts damage to the other
1870	Franco-Prussian War	22 Aug	Battle of Putziger Wiek	(Poland)	North Germans (SMS Nymphe) vs French		Little damage is inflicted on French anchored in Danzig Bay
1870	Franco-Prussian War	9 Nov	Battle of Havana	(Cuba)	Inconclusive: Germans under von Knorr (SMS Meteor) vs French under Franquet (French aviso Bouvet)		
1870	Franco-Prussian War	25 Dec 1870—7 Jan 1871	Augusta raids		North Germans (SMS Augusta)	French merchant ships	Start of German commerce raiding operations in the Atlantic; three ships are captured and sunk
1873	Cantonal Rebellion	11 Oct	Battle of Portmán	(Spain)	Spanish	Canton of Cartagena	Cantonal ships fail to break the Spanish blockade at Cartagena
1877	Russo-Turkish War	25-26 May	Action off Măcin	(Romania)	Romanias/Russians	Ottomans	
1877	Peruvian Coup attempt	29 May	Battle of Pacocha	(Peru)	Inconclusive: British under Horsey on HMS Shah, HMS Amethyst vs Peruvian rebels under Astete on Huascar		Notable for seeing the first combat use of the self-propelled torpedo
1879	War of the Pacific	12 April	Battle of Chipana	(Chile)	Inconclusive: Chileans under Latorre vs Peruvians under García		
1879	War of the Pacific	18 April	Bombardment of Pisagua	(Peru)	Inconclusive: Peruvians vs Chileans under Rebolledo		Chile's attempted amphibious landing on Peruvian land fails but causes high civilian casualties
1879	War of the Pacific	21 May	Naval Battle of Iquique	(Chile)	Peruvians under Grau (Huáscar)	Chileans under Prat (Esmeralda)	
1879	War of the Pacific	21 May	Battle of Punta Gruesa	(Chile)	Chileans under Condell (Covadonga)	Peruvians under More (Independencia)	
1879	War of the Pacific	26 May	First Battle of Antofagasta	(Chile)	Peruvians under Grau (Huáscar)	Chileans under Arteaga (Covadonga)	
1879	War of the Pacific	10 July	Second Battle of Iquique	(Peru)	Inconclusive: Peruvians under Grau (Huáscar) vs Chileans under Latorre (Almirante Cochrane and Magallanes)		
1879	War of the Pacific	23 July	Capture of the steamer Rímac	(Chile)	Peruvians under Grau and García	Chileans	
1879	War of the Pacific	28 Aug	Second Battle of Antofagasta	(Chile)	Peruvians under Grau (Huáscar)	Chileans under Latorre and Sánchez (Abtao and Magallanes)	
1879	War of the Pacific	8 Oct	Naval Battle of Angamos	(Chile)	Chileans under Riveros and Latorre	Peruvians under Grau	Chilean ships capture Peruvian ironclad Huáscar.
1879	War of the Pacific	18 Nov	Capture of the corvette Pilcomayo	(Peru)	Chileans under Portal, Ferreyros and Villavicencio (Blanco Encalada)	Peruvians under Riveros and Castillo (Pilcomayo)	
1880	War of the Pacific	27 Feb	Naval Battle of Arica	(Peru)	Peruvians under Sánchez (Manco Cápac)	Chileans under Thomson and Condell (Huáscar and Magallanes)	
1880	War of the Pacific	17 March	Rupture of the Blockade of Arica	(Peru)	Peruvians under Villavicencio	Chileans under Latorre	
1882	Anglo-Egyptian War	11–13 July	Bombardment of Alexandria	(Egypt)	United kingdom	Ahmed Urabi	
1884	Sino-French War	23 Aug	Battle of Foochow	(China)	French under Courbet	Chinese under Zhang	At Fuzhou
1885	Sino-French War	14 Feb	Battle of Shipu	(China)	French under Courbet	Chinese	
1885	Sino-French War	1 March	Battle of Zhenhai	(China)	Chinese under Ouyang, Xue, Liu and Wu	French under Courbet	
1891	Chilean Civil War	23 April	Battle of Caldera Bay	(Chile)	Chilean Balmacedists	Chilean Congressionalists	
1892	Homestead Strike	6 July	Battle on July 6	(United States)	Pennsylvania unionized steelworkers	Pinkertons	Pinkertons surrender
1893	Franco-Siamese conflict	13 July	Paknam incident	(Thailand)	French	Siamese under Richelieu	
1893	Argentine Revolution of 1893	27 Sep	Battle of El Espinillo	(Argentina)	Argentine government (Espora and Independencia)	Argentine rebels (Los Andes)	Los Andes is damaged and forced to retreat, later surrenders
1893	Hawaiian rebellions	14 Dec 1893—11 Jan 1894	Black Week	(United States)	Americans under Willis and Irwin	Hawai'i under Dole	
1893	Brazilian Naval Revolt	16 Dec	Battle of Guanabara Bay	(Brazil)	Brazilian Federalists (Aquidabã)	Loyalist Army coastal defenses	Near Rio de Janeiro
1894	Brazilian Naval Revolt	9-21 Jan	Rio de Janeiro Affair	(Brazil)	Americans under Benham and Brownson	Brazilian Federalists under Gama	Americans break the blockade of Rio de Janeiro
1894	Brazilian Naval Revolt	16 April	Battle of Santa Cantarina	(Brazil)	Brazilian Loyalists	Brazilian Federalists (Aquidabã)	Aquidabã is sunk but later returned to service
1894	First Sino-Japanese War	25 July	Battle of Pungdo	(South Korea)	Imperial Japanese Navy	Imperial Chinese Navy	
1894	First Sino-Japanese War	17 Sep	Battle of Yalu River	(South Korea)	Imperial Japanese Navy	Imperial Chinese Navy	
1895	First Sino-Japanese War	20 Jan—12 Feb	Battle of Weihaiwei	(China)	Imperial Japanese Navy	Imperial Chinese Navy	End of the First Sino-Japanese War
1896	Anglo-Zanzibar War	27 Aug	Action of 27 August	(Tanzania)	British	Sultanate of Zanzibar (HHS Glasgow)	Anglo-Zanzibar War itself lasted 38 minutes, making it the shortest military conflict in history
1898	Spanish–American War	25 April	Action of 25 April	(Cuba)	Spanish	Americans under Rodgers	
1898	Spanish–American War	1 May	Battle of Manila Bay	(Philippines)	Americans under Dewey	Spanish under Montojo	
1898	Spanish–American War	8 May	First Battle of Cárdenas	(Cuba)	Americans under Bernadou	Spanish	
1898	Spanish–American War	11 May	Second Battle of Cárdenas	(Cuba)	Spanish	Americans under Bernadou	
1898	Spanish–American War	11 May	Battle of Cienfuegos	(Cuba)	Spanish	Americans under McCalla	
1898	Spanish–American War	12 May	Bombardment of San Juan	(Puerto Rico)	Indecisive: Spanish under Macías vs Americans under Sampson		
1898	Spanish–American War	6-10 June	Battle of Guantánamo Bay	(Cuba)	Americans and Cubans under McCalla	Spanish	
1898	Spanish–American War	13 June	Action of 13 June 1898	(Cuba)	Spanish under Carranza	Americans and Cubans under Brownson	
1898	Spanish–American War	22 June	Second Battle of San Juan	(Puerto Rico)	Americans under Sigsbe	Spanish	
1898	Spanish–American War	28 June	Third Battle of San Juan	(Puerto Rico)	Americans vs Spanish		
1898	Spanish–American War	30 June	First Battle of Manzanillo	(Cuba)	Spanish	Americans under Young	
1898	Spanish–American War	30 June	Battle of Tayacoba	(Cuba)	Spanish		
1898	Spanish–American War	1 July	Second Battle of Manzanillo	(Cuba)	Spanish	Americans under Marix	
1898	Spanish–American War	1 July	Battle of the Aguadores	(Cuba)	Spanish	Americans and Cubans under Duffield	
1898	Spanish–American War	3 July	Battle of Santiago de Cuba	(Cuba)	Americans under Sampson and Schley	Spanish under Cervera	Complete destruction of the Spanish fleet in the Caribbean
1898	Spanish–American War	18 July	Third Battle of Manzanillo	(Cuba)	Americans	Spanish	
1898	Spanish–American War	21 July	Battle of Nipe Bay	(Cuba)	Americans	Spanish	
1898	Spanish–American War	14 Aug	Action of Caibarién	(Cuba)	Inconclusive: Americans Mangrove vs Spanish		Fight ends after receiving word that the war ended on 13 Aug
1899	Thousand Days' War	24 Oct	Battle of Magdalena River	(Colombia)	Colombian Conservatives	Colombian Liberals	
1899	Piracy in Australia	Oct	Mutiny on the Ethel	(Australia)	Crew of Ethel	Captain Redell and Ethel crew loyal to him	

== 20th century ==
=== Early 20th century ===
Year	War	Date	Battle	Loc.	Winners	Losers	Notes
1900	Boxer Rebellion	16-17 June	Battle of the Taku Forts	(China)	Eight-Nation Alliance	Chinese	Chinese coastal forts are bombarded and captured
1902	Markomannia incident	6 Sep	Battle between Panther and Crete-à-Pierrot	(Haiti)	German Navy (Panther)	Haitian rebels (Crête-à-Pierrot)	Crête-à-Pierrot is sunk
1904	Russo-Japanese War	9 Feb	Battle of Chemulpo Bay	(South Korea)	Japanese under Uryū	Russians under Rudnev (Varyag)	Varyag is scuttled
1904	Russo-Japanese War	9 Feb	Battle of Port Arthur	(China)	Inconclusive: Japanese under Tōgō vs Russians under Starck		
1904	Russo-Japanese War	15 June	Hitachi Maru Incident		Russians under Bezobrazov	Japanese	
1904	Russo-Japanese War	10 Aug	Battle of the Yellow Sea		Japanese under Tōgō	Russians under Vitgeft	
1904	Russo-Japanese War	14 Aug	Battle of the Japanese Sea	(South Korea)	Japanese under Kamimura	Russians under Jessen	
1904	Russo-Japanese War	20 Aug	Battle of Korsakov	(Russia)	Japanese under Sentō	Russians under Schultz	
1904	Russo-Japanese War	4-5 Oct	Dogger Bank incident	(England)	Inconclusive: Russians mistakenly fire on British trawlers and each other, thinking they are Japanese torpedo-boats		
1905	Russo-Japanese War	27-28 May	Battle of Tsushima		Japanese under Tōgō	Russians under Rozhestvensky	
1906	Dutch colonial campaigns	Sep—Oct	Dutch intervention in Bali	(Indonesia)	Dutch under van Tonnigen	Balinese under I Gusti Ngurah Made Agung	Dutch take control of southern Bali
1910		22 Nov	Revolt of the Lash	(Brazil)	Afro-Brazilian and mixed-race sailors under Cândido	Brazilian Navy	
1911	Italo-Turkish War	29-30 Sep	Battle of Preveza	(Greece)	Italians under di Ruffia	Ottomans	
1912	Italo-Turkish War	7 Jan	Battle of Kunfuda Bay	(Saudi Arabia)	Italians under Paladini	Ottomans	
1912	Italo-Turkish War	24 Feb	Battle of Beirut	(Beirut)	Italians under Revel	Ottomans	
1912	First Balkan War	18-21 Oct	Capture of Lemnos	(Greece)	Greeks under Kountouriotis	Ottomans	Greeks occupy Lemnos
1912	First Balkan War	21 Nov	Battle of Kaliakra	(Bulgaria)	Bulgarians under Dobrev	Ottomans under Orbay	
1912	First Balkan War	16 Dec	Battle of Elli	(Turkey)	Greeks under Kountouriotis	Ottomans	
1913	First Balkan War	18 Jan	Naval Battle of Lemnos	(Greece)	Greeks under Kountouriotis	Ottomans	
1913	Second Balkan War	14-15 July	Romanian landings in Bulgaria	(Bulgaria)	Romanians under Sebastian	Bulgarians	Results in the Treaty of Bucharest
1914	Mexican Revolution	4 March	First Battle of Topolobampo	(Mexico)	Huertistas	Constitutionalists	Constitutionalists forced to retreat
1914	Mexican Revolution	13 March	Second Battle of Topolobampo	(Mexico)	Draw: Huertistas vs Constitutionalists		
1914	Mexican Revolution	31 March	Third Battle of Topolobampo	(Mexico)	Huertistas	Constitutionalists	Constitutionalist gunboat is sunk
1914	Mexican Revolution	21 April	Battle of Veracruz	(Mexico)	Americans under Fletcher	Mexicans	United States occupies Veracruz
1914	Mexican Revolution	16 June	Fourth Battle of Topolobampo	(Mexico)	Huertistas	Constitutionalists	Constitutionalists raised their sunken gunboat only to have it sunk again
1914	World War I	28 July 1914—1 Nov 1918	U-boat campaign		Allies	Germans	
1914	World War I	4-10 Aug	Pursuit of Goeben and Breslau		Germans under Souchon (Goeben and Breslau)	French and British under Milne, Troubridge and Lapeyrère	Bloodless engagement; British fail to intercept Germans and they escape to Constantinople
1914	World War I	16 Aug	Battle of Antivari	(Montenegro)	French and British under Lapeyrère	Austrians under Pachner	French and British force sinks Austrian cruiser in the Adriatic
1914	World War I	24 Aug—28 Sep	Naval operations of the Kamerun campaign	(Cameroon)	British and French under Dobell	Germans	
1914	World War I	26 Aug	Sinking of SS Kaiser Wilhelm der Grosse	(Western Sahara)	British (Highflyer)	Germans (Kaiser Wilhelm der Grosse)	Highflyer intercepts and sinks Kaiser Wilhelm der Grosse
1914	World War I	27 Aug—7 Nov	Siege of Tsingtao	(China)	British and Japanese	Germans and Austrians	Japanese recapture Tsingtao
1914	World War I	28 Aug	Battle of Heligoland Bight	(Germany)	British under Tyrwhitt and Keyes	Germans under Maass and Hipper	British Grand Fleet ambushes and sinks German ships on patrol off Germany's coast; led Germany to pursue a fleet in being strategy for most of the rest of the war
1914	World War I	29 Aug-30 Aug	Occupation of German Samoa	(Samoa)	New Zealand	Germany	
1914	World War I	9 Sep—21 Oct	Allied occupation of German New Guinea	(Papua New Guinea)	Australians and Japanese under Holmes and Patey	Germans	
1914	World War I	14 Sep	Sinking of SMS Cap Trafalgar	(Brazil)	British (Carmania)	Germans (Cap Trafalgar disguised as Carmania)	
1914	World War I	20 Sep	Battle of Zanzibar	(Tanzania)	Germans under Looff (Königsberg)	British (Pegasus)	
1914	World War I	22 Sep	Action of 22 September		Germans under Weddigen (U-9)	British	
1914	World War I	22 Sep	Bombardment of Madras	(India)	Germans under Müller (Emden)	Indians	Germans destroy Indian oil refinery in Madras and sinks one merchant ship
1914	World War I	22 Sep	Bombardment of Papeete	(French Polynesia)	Germans under Spee (Scharnhorst and Gneisenau)	French under Destremau (Zélée)	
1914	World War I	17 Oct	Battle off Texel	(Netherlands)	British under Fox	Germans	
1914	World War I	28 Oct	Battle of Penang	(Malaysia)	Germans under Müller (Emden)	Russians, French and British (Zhemchug)	
1914	World War I	29 Oct	Black Sea raid		Ottomans under Souchon	Russians	
1914	World War I	Oct 1914—11 July 1915	Battle of Rufiji Delta	(Tanzania)	British under Drury-Lowe (Mersey and Severn)	Germans under Looff (Königsberg)	German cruiser is blockaded for months before being sunk
1914	World War I	1 Nov	Battle of Coronel	(Chile)	Germans under von Spee	British under Cradock	
1914	World War I	3 Nov	Raid on Yarmouth	(England)	Inconclusive: British under Beatty (D5) vs Germans under Hipper (Yorck)		Germans bombard Great Yarmouth but are intercepted
1914	World War I	9 Nov	Battle of Cocos	(Australia)	Australians under Glossop (Sydney)	Germans under Müller (Emden)	
1914	World War I	18 Nov	Battle of Cape Sarych	(Autonomous Republic of Crimea)	Russians under Eberhardt	Ottomans under Souchon	
1914	World War I	8 Dec	Battle of the Falkland Islands	(Falkland Islands)	British under Sturdee	Germans under von Spee	
1914	World War I	16 Dec	Raid on Scarborough, Hartlepool and Whitby	(England)	Germans under Hipper and Ingenohl	British under Warrender and Beatty	Little damage is done in battle; neither side losses ships
1914	World War I	25 Dec	Raid on Cuxhaven	(Germany)	British	Germans	German U-boats pursue attacking British airships, but fail to stop them
1915	World War I	24 Jan	Battle of Dogger Bank		British under Beatty	Germans under Hipper (Blücher)	In the North Sea
1915	World War I	19 Feb	Naval operations in the Dardanelles Campaign	(Turkey)	Turkish	British and French	Mainly carried out by the Royal Navy with substantial support from the French and minor contributions from Russia and Australia
1915	World War I	14 March	Battle of Más a Tierra	(Chile)	British under Luce	Germans under Lüdecke (Dresden)	Dresden is scuttled
1915	World War I	1 May	Battle off Noordhinder Bank	(Netherlands)	British	Germans	
1915	World War I	1 May	Attack on SS Gulflight		Germans (U-30) vs Americans (Gulflight)		U-30 torpedoes the then-neutral American Gulflight; fails to sink her but causes an international incident
1915	World War I	7 May	Sinking of the RMS Luistania		Germans (U-20)	British (Lusitania)	Germans kill 1193 civilians when torpedoing an ocean liner; the international opinion turns against Germany
1915	World War I	10 May	Action of 10 May	(Turkey)	Inconclusive: Russians under Eberhardt vs Ottomans under Ackermann		Near the Bosporus
1915	World War I	23-24 May	Bombardment of Ancona	(Italy)	Austro-Hungarians	Italian	Italian destroyer damaged
1915	World War I	23-24 May	Action off Vieste	(Italy)	Austro-Hungarians	Italian	Austro-Hungarians launch a successful raid against Vieste despite being intercepted by Italians
1915	World War I	24 May	Raid on Porto Buso		Italians (Zeffiro)	Austro-Hungarians	Italians raid and capture Austro-Hungarian naval base
1915	World War I	2 July	Russian raid on Gotland	(Sweden)	British and Russians under Bakhirev	Germans	Russians intercept and sink mine-laying Albatros off the Åland Islands; Roon and Prince Adalbert are damaged
1915	World War I	8 June	Action of 8 June	(Croatia)	Austro-Hungarians	Italians	
1915	World War I	8-20 Aug	Battle of the Gulf of Riga	(Latvia)	Russians and British under Kanin	Germans under Hipper	Germans prevented from breaking into the Gulf of Riga
1915	World War I	19 Aug	First Baralong incident		British under Herbert (Baralong)	Germans (U-27)	U-27 is sunk
1915	World War I	24 Aug	Second Baralong incident		British (Baralong)	Germans (U-41)	U-41 is sunk
1915	World War I	21 Oct	Hvalen incident		Germans (3 merchant raiders)	Swedish (Hvalen)	Hvalen is damaged, 1 sailor killed.
1915	World War I	10 Dec	Battle of Kirpen Island	(Turkey)	Russians	Ottomans	Two Ottoman gunboats sunk
1915	World War I	26 Dec 1915—July 1916	Battle of Lake Tanganyika	(Tanzania)	British and Belgians under Spicer-Simson (Mimi and Toutou)	Germans	Battle for control of Lake Tanganyika
1915	World War I	28-29 Dec	First Battle of Durazzo	(Albania)	Italians, British, & French	Austro-Hungarians	
1916	World War I	8 Jan	Action of 8 January		Russians under Eberhardt	Ottomans under Souchon	Brief exchange of fire in the Black Sea
1916	World War I	16 Jan	Action of 16 January	(Portugal)	Germans (Möwe)	British	Off Madeira
1916	World War I	10 Feb	Second Battle of Dogger Bank		Germans	British (Arabis)	Arabis is sunk
1916	World War I	29 Feb	Action of 29 February		British under Wardle	Germans (Greif)	German commerce raider is sunk in the North Sea; British lose one armed merchant cruiser
1916	World War I	24-25 April	Bombardment of Yarmouth and Lowestoft	(England)	Inconclusive: British under Tyrwhitt, Jellicoe and Beatty vs Germans under Boedicker vs Scheer		German battlecruiser squadron shells British ports, intercepted by small British fleet, minimal losses for both sides
1916	World War I	31 May—1 June	Battle of Jutland	(Denmark)	Inconclusive: British under Jellicoe and Beatty vs Germans under Scheer and Hipper		Two-day battle between the main British and German fleets; largest and only such engagement of World War I
1916	World War I	19 Aug	Action of 19 August		Inconclusive: British under Jellicoe and Beatty vs Germans under Scheer and Hipper		Minor skirmish
1916	World War I	27 Aug	Raid on Ruse	(Bulgaria)	Romanians	Austrians	
1916	World War I	6 Sep	Action of 6 September		Bulgarians (Podvodnik No. 18)	Russians (Bystry and Gromki)	In the Black Sea
1916	World War I	26–27 Oct	Battle of Dover Strait	(England)	Germans under Michelsen	British	Germans launch raid into the Dover Strait to disrupt shipping
1916	World War I	5 Nov	Action of 5 November		British under Laurence	Germans	
1917	World War I	10 March	Action of 10 March		Germans under Schlodien (Möwe)	New Zealand under Smith	
1917	World War I	16 March	Action of 16 March		British under Martin-Leake (Achilles)	Germans (Leopard)	Leopard sunk
1917	World War I	17 March	Action of 17 March	(England)	Germans	British	German raid on British shipping in the Strait of Dover, Ramsgate and Margate
1917	World War I	7 April	Scuttling of SMS Cormoran		Americans under Smith	Germans under Zuckschwerdt (Cormoran)	Cormoran's crew scuttles the ship before it can be captured
1917	World War I	20-21 April	Battle of Dover Strait	(England)	British under Mountevans	Germans	Destroyer battle
1917	World War I	4 May	Action of 4 May		Inconclusive: British and Australians under Dumaresq (Sydney) vs Germans (LZ92)		Neither side suffers casualties
1917	World War I	15 May	Battle of the Strait of Otranto		Inconclusive: Austro-Hungarians & Germans under Horthy vs Italians, British, & French under Acton		Successful attempt to break blockade of the strait
1917	World War I	15 Aug	Action of 15 August	(England)	Germans	British under Crisp	
1917	World War I	12-20 Oct	Operation Albion	(Estonia)	Germans under Schmidt	Russian under Bakhirev and Altvater	Germans occupy West Estonian archipelago
1917	World War I	15 Oct	Action of 15 October	(Republic of Ireland)	Americans (Cassin)	Germans (U-61)	
1917	World War I	16 Oct—3 Nov	Battle of Moon Sound	(Estonia)	Germans under Schmidt	Russians under Bakhirev	In the Baltic Sea
1917	World War I	17 Oct	Action off Lerwick	(Scotland)	Germans (Brummer and Bremse)	British	Off the Shetland Islands
1917	World War I	17 Nov	Second Battle of Heligoland Bight		Inconclusive: British under Napier and Pakenham vs Germans under Reuter		Clash during mining operation
1917	World War I	17 Nov	Action of 17 November		Americans under Berrien and Carpender	Germans (U-58)	
1917	11-12 Dec	Action of 11–12 December	(Norway)	Germans under Scheer and Heinrich	British under Cavendish and Molteno		
1918	Yangtze Patrol	17 Jan	USS Monocacy incident	(China)	Americans	Chinese	
1918	World War I	20 Jan	Battle of Imbros	(Greece)	British and Greeks	Ottomans and Germans under Paschwitz	
1918	World War I	14-15 Feb	Action of 14/15 February	(England)	Germans under Schröder and Heinecke	British under Keyes and Berry	
1918	Russian Civil War	15 Feb—Sep	Invasion of Åland	(Åland)	Soviet Russia, Finnish Reds	German, Swedish, White Russians, & Finnish Whites	Foreign forces pushed out of Åland
1918	World War I	23 April	Zeebrugge Raid	(Belgium)	Germans under Schröder	British under Jellicoe, Keyes and Bacon	Failed attempt to scuttle ships in Zeebrugge channel to prevent Germans from reaching open water
1918	World War I	23–24 April	First Ostend Raid	(Belgium)	Germans	British under Lynes and Godsal	Failed attempt to scuttle ships in Ostend channel to prevent Germans from reaching open water
1918	World War I	8 May	Action of 8 May	(Malta)	British (Wallflower)	Germans (U-32)	U-32 is sunk by depth charges
1918	World War I	9 May	Second Ostend Raid	(Belgium)	Germans	British under Keyes	Failed attempt to scuttle ships in Ostend channel to prevent Germans from reaching open water
1918	World War I	21 May	Action of 21 May	(Spain)	Americans (Christabel)	Germans (UC-56)	UC-56 was initially reported to be sunk but was later discovered to have just been damaged
1918	World War I	2 June	Sinking of SS Carolina		Germans (U-151)	Americans (Carolina)	American passenger liner is sunk
1918	World War I	10 June	Sinking of the SMS Szent István	(Croatia)	Italians	Austor-Hungarians (Szent István)	Italian MAS-15 torpedoes sink Szent István
1918	World War I	18 June	Action of 18 June		Germans (U-151)	British (Dwinsk)	Germans torpedo Dwinsk; U-151 is later engaged by Americans (Von Stuben), but escapes
1918	World War I	19 July	Tondern raid	(Denmark)	British (Furious)	Germans	British air raid on German airfield in Todern
1918	World War I	21 July	Attack on Orleans	(United States)	Germans (U-156)	Americans	Off Massachusetts
1918	Russian Civil War	16 Aug	Battle of Lake Baikal	(Russia)	Czechoslovaks under Gadja	Russians	On Lake Baikal
1918	World War I	25 Aug	Action of 25 August		Brazilians	Germans	Brazilian fleet sailing from Freetown to Dakar is attacked by German U-boats, but suffer no losses. They successfully sink one U-boat in their counterattack.
1918	World War I	2 Oct	Second Battle of Durazzo	(Albania)	Italians, British, Australians, & Americans	Austro-Hungarians	Durazzo is decimated
1918	World War I	14 Oct	Action of 14 October		Portuguese (Augusto de Castilho)	Germans under de la Perière (U-139)	Portuguese ship is sunk but civilian steamer is successfully defended
1918	World War I	31 Oct—1 Nov	Raid on Pula	(Croatia)	Italians under Revel	Austro-Hungarians (Viribus Unitis)	Italians sink Viribus Unitis without knowing it had been transferred to the State of Slovenes, Croats, and Serbs the day prior
1918	Russian Civil War	28 Nov 1918—4 Nov 1919	British Baltic Campaign		British, White Russia, Estonians and Latvians	Bolsheviks	Estonia and Latvia gain independence
1919	Russian Civil War	21 May	Battle of Alexandrovsky Fort	(Kazakhstan)	British and White Russia under Norris	Bolsheviks	
1919	Russian Civil War	18 Aug	Raid on Kronstadt	(Russia)	British under Dobson and Donald	Bolsheviks	
1920	Russian Civil War	3 May	Action of 3 May	(Russia)	Russians (Krasnaya Zarya)	French (Le Scarpe)	Le Scarpe is captured
1920	Russian Civil War	18 May	Anzali Operation	(Iran)	Bolshevik Russians and Persian Jangalis under Raskolnikov	British and White Russians under Bateman-Champain	Ten White Russian auxiliary cruisers captured; Persian Socialist Soviet Republic established
1920	Yangtze Patrol	20-21 July	Alice Dollar incident	(China)	Americans	Chinese rebels	
1920	Russian Civil War	15 Sep	Battle of Obytichnyi Spit	(Ukraine)	Inconclusive: White vs Red Russians		Both sides claim victory
1921	Russian Civil War	9 Jan	Action of 9 January	(Russia)	French	Bolshevik Russians	
1921	Turkish War of Independence	8 Feb	Action of 8 February		Turks (Alemdar)	French (C-27)	C-27 is damaged and retreats
1922	Irish Civil War	29 March	Capture of the Upnor		Irish Republican Army (Warrior)	British (Upnor)	Upnor, which is carrying weapons, is captured
1932	Chaco War	22 Dec	Battle of Bahía Negra	(Paraguay)	Inconclusive: Paraguayans (Tacuary) vs Bolivians		
1933	Colombia-Peru War	14-15 Feb	Battle of Tarapacá	(Colombia)	Colombians	Peruvians	Colombians bombard Peruvian river defenses

=== Mid-20th century ===
Year	War	Date	Battle	Loc.	Winners	Losers	Notes
1936	Spanish Civil War	5 Aug	Convoy de la Victoria	(Spain)	Spanish Nationalists	Spanish Republicans (Alcalá Galiano)	Republicans fail to stop Nationalist convoy
1936	Spanish Civil War	8 Aug	Action of 8 August		Spanish Nationalists (Almirante Cervera)	British (Blue Shadow)	Blue Shadow is sunk
1936	Spanish Civil War	16 Aug—12 Sep	Battle of Majorca	(Spain)	Spanish Nationalists	Spanish Republicans	Republican amphibious assault fails
1936	Spanish Civil War	19 Sep—Oct	Spanish Guinea uprising	(Equatorial Guinea)	Spanish Nationalists	Spanish Republicans	Republican prison ship is sunk
1936	Spanish Civil War	29 Sep	Battle of Cape Espartel	(Morocco)	Spanish Nationalists	Spanish Republicans (Almirante Ferrándiz)	Almirante Ferrándiz is sunk
1936	Spanish Civil War	14 Dec	Action of 14 December	(Algeria)	Spanish Nationalists (Canarias)	Soviets (Komsomol)	Komsomol is sunk off Oran
1937	Spanish Civil War	10 Jan	Action of 10 January	(Spain)	Spanish Nationalists (Velasco)	Soviets (Smidovich)	Smidovich is captured
1937	Spanish Civil War	5 March	Battle of Cape Machichaco	(Spain)	Spanish Nationalists (Canarias)	Spanish Republicans and Basques	
1937	Spanish Civil War	28 March	Action of 28 March	(Gibraltar)	Spanish Nationalists (Uad Kert)	Greeks (Gardelaki)	Gardelaki is captured
1937	Spanish Civil War	2 April	Action of 2 April		Spanish Nationalists (Baleares)	Greeks (Poli)	Poli is sunk
1937	Spanish Civil War	4 April	Action of 4 April		Spanish Nationalists (Huelva)	Panamanians (Janu)	Janu is captured
1937	Spanish Civil War	5 April	Action of 5 April	(Gibraltar)	Spanish Nationalists (Maria Teresa)	Greeks (Nagos)	Nagos is captured
1937	Spanish Civil War	6 April	Action of 6 April	(Spain)	Spanish Nationalists (Galerna)	Panamanians (Andra)	Andra is sunk
1937	Spanish Civil War	16 April	Action of 16 April		Spanish Nationalists (Almirante Cervera)	Panamanians (Hordena)	Hordena is captured
1937	Spanish Civil War	24 May	Attack on the Barletta	(Spain)	Spanish Republicans	Italians (Barletta)	Barletta is bombed; six Italian sailors are killed
1937	Spanish Civil War	24 May	Attack on the Albatros	(Spain)	Spanish Republicans	Germans (Albatros)	No casualties
1937	Spanish Civil War	29 May	Deutschland incident	(Spain)	Spanish Republicans and Soviets	Germans (Deutschland)	Thirty-one aboard the Deutschland are killed and 74 are injured
1937	Spanish Civil War	31 May	Bombardment of Almería	(Spain)	Germans (Admiral Scheer)	Spanish Republicans	Retaliation for attack on Admiral Scheer
1937	Spanish Civil War	7 July	Action of 7 July	(Spain)	Spanish Nationalists (Almirante Cervera)	French (Liberte)	Liberte is captured
1937	Spanish Civil War	14 July	Action of 14 July	(Spain)	Spanish Nationalists (Almirante Cervera and Galerna)	British (Molton and Royal Oak)	Molton seized off Santander
1937	Second Sino-Japanese War	7 Aug—25 Sep	Battle of Shanghai	(China)	Japanese	Chinese	In the Yangtze River; Japanese capture Shanghai
1937	Spanish Civil War	15 Aug	Action of 15 August	(Tunisia)	Italians (Freccia)	Panamanians (George W. McKnight)	George W. McKnight is disabled
1937	Spanish Civil War	11 Aug	Action of 11 August 1937	(Tunisia)	Italians (Saetta)	Spanish Republicans (Campeador)	Campeador is sunk
1937	Spanish Civil War	31 Aug	Action of 31 August	(Algeria)	Italians (Turbine)	Soviets (Timiryazev)	Timiryazev is sunk
1937	Spanish Civil War	1 Sep	Action of 1 September	(Spain)	Italians (Diaspro)	British (Woodford)	Woodford is sunk
1937	Spanish Civil War	3 Sep	Action of 3 September	(Greece)	Italians (Luigi Settembrini)	Soviets (Blagoev)	Blagoev is sunk
1937	Spanish Civil War	7 Sep	Battle of Cape Cherchell	(Algeria)	Spanish Nationalists (Baleares)	Spanish Republicans under Buiza	
1937	Spanish Civil War	12 Dec	Action of 12 December	(Gibraltar)	Spanish Nationalists (Lazaro)	French (Sydney)	Sydney is captured
1937	Second Sino-Japanese War	12 Dec	USS Panay incident	(China)	Japanese under Murata and Okumiya	Americans (Panay)	Panay sunk
1937	Spanish Civil War	21 Dec	Action of 21 September	(Gibraltar)	Spanish Nationalists (Mallorca)	French (Francois)	Francois is captured
1938	Spanish Civil War	21 Jan	Sinking of the Endymion	(Spain)	Spanish Nationalists (General Sanjurjo)	British (Endymion)	Endymion is sunk
1938	Spanish Civil War	21 Jan	Capture of the Pomaron	(Gibraltar)	Spanish Nationalists (Vincente Puchol)	Estonians (Pomaron)	Pomaron captured
1938	Spanish Civil War	22 Jan	Action of 22 January	(Gibraltar)	Spanish Nationalists (Mallorca)	Estonians (Juss)	Juss is captured
1938	Spanish Civil War	5-6 March	Battle of Cape Palos	(Spain)	Spanish Republicans under González	Spanish Nationalists (Baleares)	
1938	Spanish Civil War	19 March	Action of 19 March	(Gibraltar)	Spanish Nationalists	Soviets (Lensovet)	Lensovet is captured
1938	Spanish Civil War	30 March	Sinking of the Lena		Spanish Nationalists (General Mola)	Greeks (Lena)	
1938	Spanish Civil War	30 March	Capture of the Alix	(Gibraltar)	Spanish Nationalists (Huevla)	Norwegians (Alix)	Alix is captured
1938	Spanish Civil War	19 May	Action of 19 May	(Italy)	Spanish Nationalists (Canarias)	Greeks (Ellinico Vuono)	Ellinico Vuono is captured
1938	Spanish Civil War	26 May	Capture of the Stepanov		Spanish Nationalists (Canarias)	Soviets (Skvortzov Stepanov)	Skvortzov Stepanov is captured
1938	Spanish Civil War	26 May	Capture of the Jan		Spanish Nationalists (Iñasi)	Danish (Jan)	Jan is captured
1938	Spanish Civil War	30 May	Action of 30 May		Spanish Nationalists	Panamanians (Wintonia)	Wintonia is captured
1938	Spanish Civil War	31 May	Action of 31 May		Spanish Nationalists (Vicente Puchol)	Soviets (Potishev)	Potishev is captured
1938	Second Sino-Japanese War	11 June—28 Oct	Battle of Wuhan	(China)	Japanese	Chinese	Japanese capture Wuhan
1938	Spanish Civil War	21 July	Action of 21 July	(Gibraltar)	Spanish Nationalists	Norwegians (Skulda)	Skulda is captured
1938	Spanish Civil War	17 Oct	Action of 17 October		Spanish Nationalists (Vulcano)	Soviets (Katayama)	Katayama is captured
1938	Spanish Civil War	23 Oct	Action of 23 October		Spanish Nationalists (Almirante Cervera)	Soviets (Tsyurupa)	Tsyurupa is captured
1938	Spanish Civil War	2 Nov	Action of 2 November		Spanish Nationalists (Vulcano)	Soviets (Max Hoels)	Max Hoels is captured
1938	Spanish Civil War	9 Nov	Action of 9 November	(Gibraltar)	Spanish Nationalists	Greeks (Nicolau Eleni)	Nicolau Eleni is captured
1938	Spanish Civil War	11 Nov	Capture of the Victoria		Spanish Nationalists (Mar Cantábrico)	Greeks (Victoria)	Victoria is captured
1938	Spanish Civil War	11 Nov	Sinking of the Hanna	(Spain)	Spanish Nationalists (General Mola)	Dutch (Hanna)	Hanna is sunk
1938	Spanish Civil War	19 Nov	Action of 19 November	(Gibraltar)	Spanish Nationalists	Latvians (Everards)	Everards is captured
1939	Spanish Civil War	15 Jan	Action of 15 January		Spanish Nationalists (Dato)	French (Aunis)	Aunis is captured
1939	Spanish Civil War	28 Jan	Action of 28 January	(Spain)	Spanish Nationalists (Mar Negro)	British (Lake Lugano)	Lake Lugano is sunk
1939	Italian Invasion of Albania	7 April	Battle of Durrës	(Albania)	Italians under Sportiello	Albanians under Ulqinaku	
1939	World War II	1 Sep	Battle of Danzig Bay	(Poland)	Germans	Polish	
1939	World War II	1-3 Sep	Battle of Hel	(Poland)	Germans under Eberhardt	Polish under Steyer	All Polish ships are sunk or captured
1939	World War II	1-25 Sep	Worek Plan	(Poland)	Inconclusive: Polish under Mohuczy vs Germans under Albrecht		
1939	World War II	3 Sep 1939—8 May 1945	Battle of the Atlantic		Allies	Germans and Italians	
1939	Winter War	1 Dec	Battle of Russarö	(Finland)	Finnish	Soviets (Kirov, Stremitelny and Smetlivy)	Finnish coastal guns damage Soviet warships, forcing their retreat
1939	World War II	13 Dec	Battle of the River Plate	(Uruguay)	British and New Zealanders under Harwood	Germans under Langsdorff (Admiral Graf Spee)	Admiral Graf Spee is damaged and later scuttled
1939	Winter War	14 Dec	Battle of Utö	(Finland)	Finnish	Soviets	Finnish repel Soviets from attacking a lighthouse
1939	Winter War	18 Dec	Battle of the Beryozovye Islands	(Russia)	Soviets (Marat and Oktyabrskaya Revolutsiya) vs Finnish		Finnish coastal defenses at key forts
1939	World War II	18 Dec	Battle of the Heligoland Bight	(Germany)	Germans under Schumacher	British	
1940	World War II	8 April	Action of 8 April 1940	(Norway)	Germans (Admiral Hipper)	British (Glowworm)	Glowworm is sunk
1940	World War II	9 April	Preceding Battle of Narvik	(Norway)	Germans	Norwegians (Norge and Eidsvold)	Norwegian coastal defense ships are sunk
1940	World War II	9 April	Battle of Drøbak Sound	(Norway)	Norwegians	Germans (Blücher)	Blücher is sunk near Oscarsborg Fortress
1940	World War II	9 April	Action off Lofoten	(Norway)	Germans under Lütjens (Scharnhorst and Gneisenau) vs British under Whitworth (Renown)		No ship is lost and only suffers minimal damage; first engagement between capital ships of the war
1940	World War II	9 April	Battle of Horten Harbour	(Norway)	Germans under Strelow and Wilcke (Emden)	Norwegians	Norwegian minesweepers attempt to defend the naval base in Horten but fail
1940	World War II	9 April	Battle of Kristiansand	(Norway)	Germans (Karlsruhe and Seattle)	Norwegians	Germans successfully take Odderøya Fortress
1940	World War II	9 April	Capture of Arendal	(Norway)	Germans (Greif)	Norwegians under Holthe (Jo)	Germans take Arendal in a bloodless engagement
1940	World War II	10 April	First Battle of Narvik	(Norway)	British	Germans	Two German destroyers and a flotilla of merchant ships are destroyed
1940	World War II	10 April	Sinking of the Rio de Janeiro	(Norway)	Polish (Orzel)	Germans (Rio de Janeiro)	Rio de Janeiro is sunk
1940	World War II	13 April	Second Battle of Narvik	(Norway)	British under Whitworth (Warspite)	Germans under Bey	All remaining German destroyers in Narvik are sunk
1940	World War II	26 May—4 June	Dunkirk evacuation	(France)	Allies (British, French, Polish, Dutch, & Belgians)	Germans	More than 338,000 Allied soldiers are evacuated
1940	World War II	8 June	Operation Juno	(Norway)	Germans under Marschall (Scharnhorst and Gneisenau)	British under D'Oyly-Hughes (Glorious)	Glorious and to destroyers are sunk
1940	World War II	10-25 June	Italian invasion of France	(France) / (Italy)	Italians	French	Italian occupied zone is created in southern France
1940	World War II	14-15 June	Convoy HX 47		Germans under Dönitz	British	Two British merchant ships are sunk
1940	World War II	21-22 June	Convoy HX 49		Germans under Dönitz	British	Three British merchant ships are sunk
1940	World War II	28 June	Battle of the Espero Convoy	(Greece)	British & Australians under Tovey (Orion) vs Italians under Baroni (Espero)		
1940	World War II	3 July	Attack on Mers-el-Kebir	(Algeria)	British under Somerville	Vichy French under Darlan	Controversial attack on neutral French fleets
1940	World War II	3-6 July	Convoy OA 178		Germans	British	British merchant ships are sunk or damaged in the English Channel
1940	World War II	9 July	Battle of Calabria	(Italy)	British and Australians vs Italians		
1940	World War II	19 July	Battle of Cape Spada		British & Australians under Collins (Sydney)	Italians under Casardi (Bartolomeo Colleoni)	Off Crete
1940	World War II	15 Aug	Sinking of the Elli	(Greece)	Italians (Delfino)	Greeks (Elli)	Elli is sunk
1940	World War II	24-27 Aug	Convoy HX 65		Germans under Dönitz	Canadians & British	Eight Allied ships sunk - first Canadian action of the war
1940	World War II	3-5 Sep	Convoy FS 271		Germans	British	Five British merchant ships are sunk
1940	World War II	6-9 Sep	Convoy SC 2		Germans	Canadians and British	Three Allied merchant ships are sunk
1940	World War II	20-22 Sep	Convoy HX 72	(United Kingdom)	Germans	British	Eleven British ships sunk in the North Atlantic
1940	World War II	23-25 Sep	Battle of Dakar	(Senegal)	Vichy French	British, Free French and Australians	Vichy French fight off Allied landing at Dakar
1940	World War II	12 Oct	Battle of Cape Passero	(Italy)	British under McCarthy (Ajax and York)	Italians	Three Italian destroyers are sunk
1940	World War II	16-19 Oct	Convoy SC 7	(United Kingdom)	Germans under Dönitz	British under Mackinnon	20 ships sunk in North Atlantic
1940	World War II	19-20 Oct	Convoy HX 79	(United Kingdom)	Germans under Dönitz	British	Twelve ships sunk in North Atlantic
1940	World War II	20-21 Oct	Attack on Convoy BN 7	(Eritrea)	Allies (British, Indians, Australians, & New Zealanders) under Rivett-Carnac	Italians under Borsini	One Italian destroyer is sunk
1940	World War II	4-11 Nov	Operation MB8		British under Cunningham and Lyster	Italians under Campioni	
1940	World War II	5 Nov	Convoy HX 84		Germans under Krancke	British under Fegen	Five ships sunk in North Atlantic
1940	World War II	9 Nov	Battle of Gabon	(Gabon)	Free Frenchunder d'Argenlieu (Savorgnan de Brazza)	Vichy French (Bougainville)	Bougainville is sunk
1940	World War II	11-12 Nov	Battle of Taranto	(Italy)	British under Cunningham and Lyster	Italians under Campioni	Air attack on Italians anchored at Taranto, inspiring the Japanese attack on Pearl Harbor
1940	World War II	12 Nov	Battle of the Strait of Otranto		British and Australians	Italians	Italian convey is destroyed
1940	prelude to Jewish insurgency in Mandatory Palestine	25 Nov	Patria disaster	(Mandatory Palestine)	Haganah	British	Haganah sinks a British ship intended to deport Jews killing over 200 Jewish refugees plus 50 crew and British soldiers.
1940	World War II	27 Nov	Battle of Cape Spartivento	(Italy)	British under Somerville and Holland vs Italians under Campioni and Iachino		
1940	World War II	30 Nov—27 Dec	Operation Nordseetour		Germans under Meisel (Admiral Hipper)	British	Two British ships are damaged and one is sunk in the North Atlantic
1940	World War II	1-3 Dec	Convoy HX 90	(United Kingdom)	Germans and Italians under Dönitz	British and Canadians	Eleven ships sunk in North Atlantic
1940	World War II	6–8 Dec and 27 Dec	German attacks on Nauru	(Nauru)	Germans under Eyssen	Australians, British and Norwegians	Germans destroy Allied merchant ships off Nauru
1941	World War II	10-11 Jan	Operation Excess	(Italy)	British and Australians	Italians and Germans	Royal Navy engages maritime strike Luftwaffe
1941	World War II	12 Jan—2 Feb	Convoy SC 19		Germans under Dönitz	British & Canadians	Four Allied merchant ships are sunk
1941	World War II	17 Jan	Battle of Ko Chang	(Thailand)	Vichy France	Thailand	
1941	World War II	22 Jan—8 Feb	Convoy SC 20		Germans under Dönitz	British & Canadians	Five Allied merchant ships are sunk
1941	World War II	22 Jan—22 March	Operation Berlin		Germans under Lütjens (Scharnhorst and Gneisenau)	British under Tovey	Twenty-two British merchant ships are sunk or captured
1941	World War II	30 Jan—18 Feb	Convoy HX 106		Germans under Lütjens and Dönitz (Scharnhorst and Gneisenau)	British & Canadians	Two British merchant ships are sunk
1941	World War II	31 Jan	Attack on Convoy AN 14	(Greece)	Italians under Mimbelli	Allies (British, Australians, & Greeks) under Packer	Allied merchant ship disabled
1941	World War II	8-11 Feb	Convoy HG 53		Germans	British	Nine ships sunk and one German Fw 200 Condor shot down
1941	World War II	25-28 Feb	Operation Abstention	(Greece)	Italians under Biancheri and Mimbelli	British under Cunningham	British are prevented from landing on Italian-occupied Kastelorizo
1941	World War II	27 Feb	Action of 27 February	(Maldives)	New Zealanders (Leander)	Italians (Ramb I)	Ramb I is sunk
1941	World War II	2-8 March	Convoy OB 293	(United Kingdom)	British	Germans under Dönitz	Three ships and two U-boats sunk in North Atlantic
1941	World War II	4 March	Operation Claymore	(Norway)	British and Norwegians	Germans	British raid a fish oil plant in occupied Norway, sinking several German merchant ships
1941	World War II	15-17 March	Convoy HX 112	(United Kingdom)	British & Canadians	Germans under Dönitz	U-boats attack Allied convoy; Allies suffer minimal losses and sink two U-boats
1941	World War II	26 March	Raid on Souda Bay	(Greece)	Italians under Faggioni	British (York) Norwegians (Pericles) under Portal	York and Pericles are sunk
1941	World War II	27-29 March	Battle of Cape Matapan	(Greece)	British & Australians under Cunningham	Italians under Iachino	
1941	World War II	2-5 April	Convoy SC 26		Germans under Dönitz	British	Ten ships sunk and one U-boat destroyed in North Atlantic
1941	World War II	4 April	Action of 4 April	(Cape Verde)	Germans under Kähler (Thor)	British (Voltair)	Voltair sunk
1941	World War II	6-18 April	Invasion of Yugoslavia	(Socialist Federal Republic of Yugoslavia)	Germans, Italians, & Hungarians	Yugoslavs	Yugoslav Fleet attempts to repel Axis air attacks and river operations, most Yugoslav ships are sunk or captured.
1941	World War II	6 April	Action of 6 April	(Eritrea)	British (Capetown) vs Italians (MAS-213)		Capetown is damaged
1941	World War II	16 April	Battle of the Tarigo Convoy	(Tunisia)	British under Mack (Mohawk)	Italians under Cristofaro (Duisburg, Lampo, Luca Tarigo and Baleno)	Duisburg, Lampo, Luca Tarigo, Baleno and Mohawk are sunk
1941	World War II	7-10 May	Convoy OB 318	(Iceland)	British	Germans under Dönitz	Seven ships sunk and one U-boat captured in North Atlantic
1941	World War II	8 May	Action of 8 May	(Seychelles)	British (Cornwall)	Germans under Krüder (Pinguin)	Pinguin is sunk
1941	World War II	10-28 May	Convoy HX 126		Germans under Dönitz	British	Nine merchant ships sunk
1941	World War II	21 May—1 June	Battle of Crete	(Greece)	Germans & Italians	British & Australians	Royal Navy loses three cruisers and six destroyers to Axis air attacks; Axis occupies Crete and establishes Fortress Crete
1941	World War II	24 May	Battle of the Denmark Strait	(Denmark)	Germans (Bismarck and Prinz Eugen)	British (Hood and Prince of Wales)	Hood is sunk
1941	World War II	24–27 May	Bismarck Chase	(France)	British and Polish under Tovey	Germans under Lütjens (Bismarck)	Bismarck is sunk
1941	World War II	9 June	Battle of the Litani River	(Lebanon)	Australians & British	Vichy French	Vichy French are chased away by Allied ships
1941	World War II	16 June—3 July	Convoy HX 133		Germans under Dönitz	British & Canadians	Six Allied merchant ships sunk
1941	World War II	18 June—12 July	Convoy SL 78		Norwegians & British	Germans	Four German U-boats sink eight Allied merchant ships
1941	World War II	22 June—3 Aug	Gulf of Riga campaign	(Latvia)	Germans under Schmunt	Soviets under Tributs	Series of light engagements between German and Soviet ships, results in German control of the Gulf of Riga
1941	World War II	22 June 1941—27 Dec 1942	Western Black Sea raids	(Romania) / (Bulgaria)	Axis (Germans, Romanians, & Bulgarians) under Macellariu	Soviets under Oktyabrskiy	Series of raids conducted by the Soviets along Romanian and Bulgarian coasts fails to disrupt Axis shipping
1941	World War II	26 June	Raid on Constanța	(Romania)	Romanians and Germans	Soviets under Oktyabrskiy	Soviets are successfully repelled by Romanian destroyers
1941	World War II	26 June	Action of 26 June	(Romania)	Romanians	Soviets	One Soviet gunboat captured and damaged
1941	World War II	9 July	Action of 9 July	(Romania)	Romanians	Soviets	Off Mangalia
1941	World War II	13-14 July	Operation München	(Moldova) / (Ukraine)	Romanians & Germans (air support) under Macellariu (Mihail Kogălniceanu)	Soviets under Oktyabrskiy	
1941	World War II	13-28 July	Operation Substance		British & Australians under Somerville (Force H)	Italians	Italians attack British convoy while en route to Malta
1941	World War II	19 July—1 Aug	Convoy OG 69		Germans and Italians under Dönitz	British	Submarines inflict heavy casualties on British convoy
1941	Ecuadorian-Peruvian War	25 July	Battle of Guayaquil	(Ecuador)	Indecisive: Ecuadorians (Abdón Calderón) vs Peruvians (Almirante Villar)		Almirante Villar is damaged and forced to retreat
1941	World War II	26 July	Battle of Bengtskär	(Finland)	Finnish	Soviets	Finnish gunboats sink a Soviet patrol boat during an attempted invasion of Bengtskär
1941	World War II	10-15 Aug	Convoy HG 70		British	Germans and Italians under Dönitz	Minimal losses on both sides
1941	World War II	13-25 Aug	Convoy OG 71		Germans under Dönitz	British and Norwegians	Ten ships sunk in North Atlantic
1941	World War II	25 Aug	Battle of Khuzestan	(Iran)	British and Australians	Iranians (Babr and Palang)	Babr and Palang are sunk
1941	World War II	27 Aug	Capture of U-570	(Iceland)	British and Canadians	Germans (U-570)	Allies capture U-570
1941	World War II	27-31 Aug	Soviet evacuation of Tallinn	(Estonia)	Germans and Finnish	Soviets under Tributs	
1941	World War II	9-11 Sep	Convoy SC 42		Germans under Dönitz	British and Canadians	Fourteen ships and two U-boats sunk in North Atlantic
1941	World War II	17 Sep—1 Oct	Convoy HG 73		Germans under Dönitz	British	Nine ships sunk in North Atlantic
1941	World War II	27 Sep	Operation Halberd	(Italy)	British under Somerville	Italians under Iachino	
1941	World War II	27-28 Sep	Action in Tarrafal Bay	(Cape Verde)	Inconclusive: British vs Germany under Dönitz		
1941	World War II	14-18 Oct	Convoy SC 48		Germans under Dönitz	British and Canadians	Eleven ships sunk in North Atlantic
1941	World War II	22 Oct—5 Nov	Convoy HX 156		British and Americans	Germans under Dönitz	
1941	World War II	30 Oct 1941—4 July 1942	Siege of Sevastopol	(Ukraine)	Italians, Germans (air support), & Romanians (air support)	Soviets under Oktyabrskiy and Levchenko	Soviet Black Sea Fleet fails to defend Sevastopol from Axis
1941	World War II	6 Nov	Sinking of Uralets	(Autonomous Republic of Crimea)	Romanians (Delfinul)	Soviets (Uralets)	Uralets sunk
1941	World War II	8-9 Nov	Battle of the Duisburg Convoy	(Italy)	British under Agnew	Italians under Brivonesi	Italian convoy destroyed
1941	World War II	19 Nov	Sinking of HMAS Sydney	(Australia)	Inconclusive: Australians under Burnett (Sydney) vs Germans under Detmers (Kormoran)		Sydney and Kormoran destroy each other in a single ship action off Western Australia; Sydney is lost with all hands
1941	World War II	6 Dec	Action of 6 December	(Bulgaria)	Bulgarians (Chernomorets and Belomorets)	Soviets (Shch-204)	
1941	World War II	7 Dec	Pearl Harbor	(United States)	Japanese under Yamamoto and Nagumo	Americans under Kimmel and Short	Started the Pacific War; Japanese launch surprise raid on American naval base, forcing United States to enter World War II
1941	World War II	8-23 Dec	Battle of Wake Island	(United States)	Japanese	Americans	American coastal and air defenses at Wake Island hold off Japanese invasion for 15 days
1941	World War II	8-25 Dec	Battle of Hong Kong	(Hong Kong)	Japanese under Niimi	British & Indians	Japanese occupy Hong Kong
1941	World War II	10 Dec	Sinking of Prince of Wales and Repulse	(Malaysia)	Japanese	British (Prince of Wales and Repulse)	Prince of Wales and Repulse are sunk by Japanese air attack in the South China Sea
1941	World War II	13 Dec	Battle of Cape Bon	(Tunisia)	British and Dutch	Italians under Toscano	
1941	World War II	16 Dec 1941—March 1942	Battle of Borneo	(Indonesia)	Japanese	British and Dutch	Japanese occupy British and Dutch Borneo
1941	World War II	17 Dec	First Battle of Sirte	(Libya)	Indecisive: British under Cunningham vs Italians under Iachino		
1941	World War II	17 Dec	Battle of Jibrieni	(Romania)	Romanians, Bulgarians, & Hungarians	Soviets	Soviets lose a submarine
1941	World War II	19 Dec	Raid on Alexandria	(Egypt)	Italians under Borghese	British under Morgan	In Alexandria Harbor
1941	World War II	19-23 Dec	Convoy HG 76		British	Germans under Dönitz	Four ships sunk and five U-boats destroyed
1942	World War II	12 Jan	Action of 12 January	(Indonesia)	Japanese (Yamakaze)	Dutch (Prins van Oranje)	Minelayer Prins van Oranje is intercepted and sunk
1942	World War II	14 Jan	Operation Postmaster	(Equatorial Guinea)	British under March-Phillipps	Germans and Italians	Allies capture three Axis merchant ships in Santa Isabel
1942	World War II	17 Jan	Action of 17 January 1942	(Philippines)	Filipinos (Abra & Luzon)	Japanese	Philippine torpedo boats Abra & Luzon are attacked by nine Japanese dive bombers, attack is repelled, damaging and shooting down three aircraft
1942	World War II	23-25 Jan	Battle of Balikpapan	(Indonesia)	Japanese	Americans and Dutch	Several Japanese ships are sunk but the Allies fail to stop them from occupying Balikpapan
1942	World War II	26-27 Jan	Battle off Endau	(Malaysia)	Japanese under Hashimoto	Australians (Vampire)	Vampire is sunk
1942	World War II	30 Jan—3 Feb	Battle of Ambon	(Indonesia)	Japanese under Takagi and Itō (W-9)	Americans, Australians, & Dutch (Heron)	Japanese invade Ambon Island; W-9 is sunk and Heron is damaged but survives. Dutch and Australian prisoners of war of massacred.
1942	World War II	30 Jan—15 Feb	Convoy SC 67		British, Canadians, & Norwegians	Germans under Dönitz	
1942	World War II	1 Feb	Marshalls-Gilberts raids	(Marshall Islands) / (Kiribati)	Americans, Gilbertese and Elliceans under Halsey and Fletcher	Japanese under Inoue and Gotō	Japanese bases endure minor damage
1942	World War II	4 Feb	Battle of Makassar Strait	(Indonesia)	Japanese under Tsukahara	Americans and Dutch under Doorman	
1942	World War II	11-13 Feb	Channel Dash		Germans under Ciliax	British under Ramsay	Major Kriegsmarine surface units escape from occupied France to Germany; British attempt to intercept with disastrous results
1942	World War II	13 Feb	Battle of Palembang	(Indonesia)	Japanese	British (Li Wo)	Li Wo sinks a Japanese transport, but is later sunk herself
1942	World War II	16 Feb	Attack on Aruba	(Aruba)	Germans and Italians under Hartenstein	Dutch and Americans under Andrews	Several German U-boats sink several Allied oil tankers in coordinated attack
1942	World War II	16 Feb—23 March	Operation Neuland		Germans and Italians under Dönitz and Polacchini	Americans under Hoover	In the Caribbean Sea
1942	World War II	18-20 Feb	Battle of Badung Strait	(Indonesia)	Japanese	Americans, British and Dutch under Doorman	Allies lose a destroyer
1942	World War II	19 Feb	Bombing of Darwin	(Australia)	Japanese under Nagumo and Fuchida	Australians and Americans	Japanese attack Australia
1942	World War II	21-25 Feb	Convoy ON 67		Germans under Dönitz	Americans and Canadians	Eight ships sunk in North Atlantic
1942	World War II	27 Feb	Battle of the Java Sea	(Indonesia)	Japanese under Takagi	Allies (Americans, British, Australians, & Dutch) under Doorman	
1942	World War II	27 Feb	Sinking of the Langley	(Indonesia)	Japanese	Americans (Langley)	Langley is severely damaged and forced to be scuttled.
1942	World War II	28 Feb—1 March	Battle of Sunda Strait	(Indonesia)	Japanese	Americans, Australians, & Dutch under Waller and Rooks (Houston, Perth and Evertsen)	Continuation of the Battle of the Java Sea; Houston and Perth are sunk
1942	World War II	1 March	Second Battle of the Java Sea	(Indonesia)	Japanese under Takagi and Takahashi	British and Americans under Gordon (Exeter, Encounter and Pope)	Continuation of the Battle of the Java Sea; Exeter, Encounter and Pope are sunk
1942	World War II	1 March	Battle of the Bali Strait	(Indonesia)	Japanese vs Americans		Continuation of the Battle of the Java Sea; four surviving American destroyers skirmish with the Japanese, but escape to Australia
1942	World War II	3 March	Scuttling of USS Perch	(Indonesia)	Japanese	Americans (Perch)	Perch is damaged and scuttled; crew is later captured
1942	World War II	4 March	Last Stand of HMAS Yarra		Japanese	Australians (Yarra)	While escorting a small convoy, Yarra is intercepted by Japanese and sunk
1942	World War II	6-13 March	Operation Sportpalast	(Norway)	Germans under Ciliax (Tirpitz) vs British under Tovey		Germans and British fail to locate each other, neutralizing threat of altercation
1942	World War II	22 March	Second Battle of Sirte	(Libya)	British under Vian	Italians under Iachino	Italians fail to sink British cargo ships; delay of the convoy led to the loss of four freighters by air attack
1942	World War II	27 March	Action of 27 March	(United States)	Germans under Hardegen (U-123)	Americans (Atik)	Atik is sunk
1942	World War II	28 March	St Nazaire Raid	(France)	British under Ryder and Beattie (Campbelltown)	Germans under Mecke, Schulz and Sohler	British crash into Normandie dry dock, rending it useless for the rest of the war
1942	World War II	28-29 March	Convoy PQ 13		Germans	British, Soviets, & Polish (Trinidad)	Trinidad is damaged
1942	World War II	31 March—1 April	Battle of Christmas Island	(Australia)	Japanese under Nishimura (Naka)	Americans (Seawolf) & British	Naka is damaged; Japan invades and occupies Christmas Island
1942	World War II	31 March—10 April	Indian Ocean Raid	(Sri Lanka)	Japanese under Nagumo and Fuchida	British & Canadians (air support) under Somerville	Japanese attack Ceylon
1942	World War II	8 April	Action off Cebu	(Philippines)	Inconclusive: Americans vs Japanese		American torpedo boats PT-34 & PT-41 engage and torpedo the Japanese cruiser Kuma, but torpedoes fail to explode.
1942	World War II	14 April	Convoy OG 82	(Portugal)	British	Germans under Dönitz	One U-boat sunk
1942	World War II	19 April	Bombardment of Curaçao	(Curaçao)	Dutch	Germans under Kals (U-130)	Germans attempt to shell Dutch oil refinery on Curaçao; U-130is engaged by Dutch shore batteries, but escapes
1942	World War II	3-4 May	Invasion of Tulagi	(Solomon Islands)	Japanese under Yamamoto, Inoue, Gotō and Shima	Americans & Australians (air support) under Fletcher (Yorktown)	Allies sink several small warships but fail to prevent the capture of Tulagi
1942	World War II	5 May—6 Nov	Battle of Madagascar	(Madagascar)	Allies (British, Australians, Dutch, & Polish) under Sturges and Syfret	Vichy French & Japanese	Allies engage Vichy French and Japanese warships before securing the island for Free French
1942	World War II	6-21 May	Convoy ON 92		Germans under Dönitz	Americans & Canadians	Allied convoy sustains heavy casualties
1942	World War II	8 May	Battle of the Coral Sea	(Papua New Guinea) / (Solomon Islands)	Mixed results: Tactical victory for Japanese (Sōhō and Shōkaku); strategic victory for Americans & Australians (Lexington and Yorktown)		Japanese invasion convoy turned back by US carrier aircraft; first carrier battle in history.
1942	World War II	22-27 May	Action of 22 May		Italians (Barbarigo)	Brazilians (Comandante Lyra)	Comandante Lyra is sunk, causing Brazilian Navy B-25s to give chase for five days, but eludes destruction
1942	World War II	31 May—8 June	Attack on Sydney Harbour	(Australia)	Japanese under Sasaki vs Allies (Australians, Americans, British, Dutch, & Indians) under Muirhead-Gould (Kuttabul)		Kuttabul is sunk
1942	World War II	May 1942—Nov 1944	Battle of the St. Lawrence	(Canada)	Canadians & British under Nelles and Murray	Germans under Dönitz	German U-Boats campaign in Gulf of St. Lawrence
1942	World War II	4–5 June	Battle of Midway	(United States)	Americans under Nimitz, Fletcher and Spruance	Japanese under Yamamoto, Kondō, Nagumo and Yamaguchi	Americas sink four Japanese carriers and one heavy cruiser
1942	World War II	6 June	Action of 6 June	(Brazil)	Germans (Stier)	Americans (Stanvac Calcutta)	Stanvac Calcutta is sunk
1942	World War II	8 June	Shelling of Newcastle	(Australia)	Japanese (I-21) vs Australians		Japanese shell Newcastle, but do no damage; I-21 escapes
1942	World War II	12-15 June	Operation Vigorous		Italians under Iachino	British, Polish, & Greek (air support) under Vian	Six ships sunk from convoy to Malta
1942	World War II	14-15 June	Operation Harpoon		Germans & Italians under da Zara	British & Australians under Curteis and Hardy	Six ships sunk from convoy to Malta
1942	World War II	14-17 June	Convoy HG 84		Inconclusive: Germans under Dönitz vs British under Hudson and Walker		Five British merchant ships are sunk
1942	World War II	2-4 July	Convoy PQ 17		Germans under Raeder, Dönitz and Stumpff	Allies (British, Americans, Free French, & Soviets) under Tovey, Pound, Hamilton, Broome and Dowding	24 ships sunk from Arctic convoy to Soviet Union
1942	World War II	5 July	Action of 5 July	(United States)	Americans (Growler)	Japanese (Arare)	Arare is sunk
1942	World War II	5-8 July	Convoy QS-15	(Canada)	Germans (U-132)	Canadians	Three merchant ships are sunk
1942	World War II	8-10 July	Battle of Someri	(Finland)	Finnish and Germans	Soviets under Levechenko	Soviet gunboats engaged and sunk
1942	World War II	17-31 July	Convoy ON 113		Germans under Dönitz	British & Canadians	Five Allied merchant ships are sunk
1942	World War II	24 July—8 Aug	Convoy ON 115		Germans	British & Canadians	Three Allied merchant ships and one German U-boat are sunk
1942	World War II	3 Aug	Attack on the Dureenbee	(Australia)	Japanese (I-175)	Australians (Dureenbee)	Dureenbee is damaged beyond repair
1942	World War II	3 Aug	Action of 3 August	(Faroe Islands)	British (Saracen)	German (U-335)	U-335 is sunk
1942	World War II	5-10 Aug	Convoy SC 94		Germans under Dönitz	Canadians, British, & Polish	Eleven ships and two U-boats sunk in North Atlantic
1942	World War II	8 Aug	Battle of Savo Island	(Solomon Islands)	Japanese under Mikawa	Americans & Australians under Turner and Crutchley	Japanese sink four cruisers escorting Guadalcanal invasion convoy
1942	World War II	11–15 Aug	Operation Pedestal		Germans & Italians under da Zara and Kesselring vs British under Syfret and Burrough		Thirteen ships sunk from convoy to Malta
1942	World War II	16–30 Aug	Operation Wunderland	(Russia)	Germans under Schmundt and Meendsen-Bohlken	Soviets under Golovko, Kacharava and Baluntsev	Germans successfully raid Soviet shipping in the Kara Sea, sinking several ships
1942	World War II	22–25 Aug	Convoy ON 122		Germans under Dönitz	British & Norwegians	German U-boats inflict casualties on Allied convoy, demonstrated importance of radar
1942	World War II	24 Aug	Battle of the Eastern Solomons	(Solomon Islands)	Americans under Fletcher and Kinkaid	Japanese under Kondō, Nagumo, Abe, Hara and Mikawa (Ryujo)	Ryujo sunk while attacking Guadalcanal
1942	World War II	27-28 Aug	Convoys SG-6/LN-6	(Canada)	Germans under Dönitz	Americans & Canadians	Two German submarines sink two Allied merchant ships.
1942	World War II	2–21 Sep	Operation Orator		Allies (British, Norwegians, Soviets, & Free French) under Hopps	Germans under Carls	Allies defend Convoy PQ 18 from German attacks, losing 13 merchant ships to Germany's loss of four U-boats; majority of convoy makes it to Arkhangelsk
1942	World War II	4 Sep—2 Nov	Battle of Bell Island	(Canada)	Indecisive: Germans vs Canadians		Two German submarines sink four Canadian ore ships off Newfoundland with heavy casualties
1942	World War II	6-10 Sep	Convoy QS-33	(Canada)	Germans under Dönitz	Canadians	Two German submarines sink four Allied merchant ships and one Canadian armed yacht
1942	World War II	10-14 Sep	Convoy ON 127	(Canada)	Germans	Canadians & British	Seven ships sunk in North Atlantic
1942	World War II	12-16 Sep	Convoy SQ-36	(Canada)	Germans	Canadians & British	Two German submarines sink three Allied merchant ships
1942	World War II	12-16 Sep	Convoy TAG 5	(Canada)	Germans under Dönitz and Krech	Americans & Canadians	Two ships sunk in Caribbean Sea
1942	World War II	12-24 Sep	Laconia Incident	(United Kingdom)	British, Polish, & Americans under Sharp and Richardson (Laconia)	Germans, Italians, & Vichy French under Hartenstein and Würdemann (U-156)	Laconia sunk by U-156; Axis submarines and warships attempt to rescue survivors before being attacked by American aircraft, and forced to call off rescue efforts. This resulted in the issuance of the Laconia Order, which forbade the Kriegsmarine from rescuing Allied survivors.
1942	World War II	12–28 Sep	Convoy SC 100	(Greenland)	Germans under Dönitz	Allies (Americans, British, Canadians, & Polish)	Five Allied merchant ships are sunk
1942	World War II	13-14 Sep	Operation Agreement	(Libya)	Germans under Lombardi	Americans	Five Allied ships sunk; one German U-boat sunk and five damaged off Tobruk
1942	World War II	13–26 Sep	Convoy QP 14		Germans under Dönitz	British under Dowding	Germans sink five Allied ships; Allies sink one U-boat and damage five
1942	World War II	27 Sep	Action of 27 September	(Suriname)	Inconclusive: Germans (Stier) vs Americans (Stephen Hopkins)		Both ships sink each other
1942	World War II	1 Oct	Battle of Cape Burnas	(Romania)	Romanians & Germans (air support)	Soviets	Romanian gunboats engage and sink Soviet submarine after it sank a German transport
1942	World War II	12 Oct	Battle of Cape Esperance	(Solomon Islands)	Americans under Scott	Japanese under Gotō and Jōjima	Americans intercept Japanese approaching Guadalcanal
1942	World War II	12-16 Oct	Convoy SC 104		Germans under Dönitz	British	Eight ships and two U-boats sunk in North Atlantic
1942	World War II	22 Oct	Battle of Sukho Island	(Russia)	Soviets	Germans, Italians, & Finnish (air support)	Germany attempts amphibious invasion of Sukho, but are repelled
1942	World War II	26 Oct	Battle of the Santa Cruz Islands	(Solomon Islands)	Japanese under Kondō, Nagumo, Abe, Kakuta	Americans under Halsey, Kinkaid, Murray and Mason (Hornet)	Hornet is sunk in aircraft carrier battle
1942	World War II	26-29 Oct	Convoy HX 212		Germans under Dönitz	Americans, British, & Canadians	Six ships sunk in North Atlantic
1942	World War II	27-31 Oct	Convoy SL 125		Germans	British, New Zealanders, & Free French	Eleven ships sunk decoying U-boats away from Operation Torch
1942	World War II	1-4 Nov	Convoy SC 107		Germans under Dönitz	British, Canadians, & Americans	Fifteen ships and one U-boat sunk in North Atlantic
1942	World War II	2-8 Nov	Convoy TAG 18		Germans under Dönitz, Lassen and Witt	Americans	Six Allied ships sunk in Caribbean Sea
1942	World War II	6-11 Nov	Convoy TAG 19		Germans under Dönitz and Staats	Americans & British	Two ships sunk in Caribbean Sea
1942	World War II	8 Nov	Naval Battle of Casablanca	(Morocco)	Americans under Hewitt	Vichy France and Germany under Michelier and Kals	French fleet in harbour and shore batteries fail to defend Moroccan neutrality
1942	World War II	11 Nov	Attack on the Ondina	(Australia)	Japanese (Hōkoku Maru and Aikoku Maru)	Dutch and Indians (Ondina and Bengal)	Allied oil tanker and its escort defend themselves against two Japanese merchant raiders, sinking one of them
1942	World War II	12-15 Nov	Naval Battle of Guadalcanal	(Solomon Islands)	Americans under Halsey, Callaghan, Scott and Lee	Japanese under Yamamoto, Abe, Kondō, Tanaka, Kakuta and Mikawa	Last offensive Japanese attempted in the Guadalcanal campaign; eleven transports and two battleships sunk and both sides incur heavy losses
1942	World War II	15–18 Nov	Convoy ON 144		Germans under Dönitz	Americans, British, & Norwegians	German U-boats inflict high casualties upon an Allied convoy
1942	World War II	30 Nov	Battle of Tassafaronga	(Solomon Islands)	Japanese under Tanaka, Sato and Nakahara	Americans under Wright, Tisdale, Cole and Abercrombie	Americans intercept Japanese destroyers resupplying Guadalcanal, but suffer heavy losses from torpedo attack
1942	World War II	2 Dec	Battle of Skerki Bank	(Tunisia)	British & Australians under Harcourt	Italians & Germans under Cocchia	Allied fleet intercepts Italian convoy and sinks all four transport ships and most of their escorting destroyers
1942	World War II	11–31 Dec	Convoy ON 153		Germans under Dönitz	British & Canadians	Three Allied merchant ships sunk
1942	World War II	18 Dec 1942—June 1943	Operation Lilliput	(Papua New Guinea)	Australians & Americans	Japanese	Australians provides escort to New Guinea convoys, defends them from Japanese air attacks
1942	World War II	26–30 Dec	Convoy ON 154		Germans under Dönitz	British, Canadians, & Americans under Egerton and Windeyer	Fourteen ships and one U-boat sunk in North Atlantic
1942	World War II	30 Dec 1942—3 Jan 1943	Convoy JW 51B		British, Polish, & Dutch under Tovey, Sherbrooke and Burnett	Germans under Dönitz, Kummetz and Stumpff	
1942	World War II	31 Dec	Battle of the Barents Sea	(Norway)	British under Sherbrooke and Burnett (Convoy JW 51B)	Germans under Kummetz	
1943	World War II	3-12 Jan	Convoy TM 1		Germans	British & Belgians	Seven ships sunk in North Atlantic
1943	World War II	14 Jan—18 Feb	Operation Ke	(Solomon Islands)	Japanese under Yamamoto and Imamura	Americans, Australians, & New Zealanders under Halsey and Patch	Japan withdraws from the Solomon Islands; Allied and Japanese fleets conduct final engagements of the Guadalcanal campaign
1943	World War II	19-20 Jan	Battle off Zuwarah	(Libya)	British	Italians under Di Bartolo	British sink Italian minesweepers
1943	World War II	23 Jan—3 Feb	Convoy SG-19	(Greenland)	Germans (U-223)	Americans (Dorchester)	Dorchester is sunk with a loss of 674 out of 904 of her crew, the greatest American loss of life from a single ship in a convoy
1943	World War II	28 Jan	Shelling of Port Gregory	(Australia)	Inconclusive: Japanese (I-165) vs Australians		Inconsequential attack on Port Gregory; there are no casualties
1943	World War II	29 Jan	Battle of Rennell Island	(Solomon Islands)	Japanese	Americans under Halsey (Chicago)	Chicago is lost
1943	World War II	4-7 Feb	Convoy SC 118		Germans under Dönitz	Americans, British, & Free French	Eight ships and one U-boat sunk in North Atlantic
1943	World War II	21-25 Feb	Convoy ON 166		Germans	Americans, British, Canadians, & Polish	Eleven ships and two U-boats sunk in North Atlantic
1943	World War II	2-4 March	Battle of the Bismarck Sea	(Papua New Guinea)	Americans & Australians (air support) under Whitehead and Hewitt	Japanese under Mikawa and Kimura	Twelve Japanese ships are sunk en route to New Guinea
1943	World War II	6 March	Battle of Blackett Strait	(Solomon Islands)	Americans under Merrill	Japanese	Americans intercept and sink two Japanese destroyers
1943	World War II	6-10 March	Convoy SC 121		Germans under Dönitz	Americans, British, & Canadians under Birnie and Heineman	Seven ships sunk in North Atlantic
1943	World War II	10-11 March	Convoy HX 228		Inconclusive: Germans under Dönitz vs Allies (British, Polish, Free French, & Americans)		Five ships and two U-boats sunk in North Atlantic
1943	World War II	16-19 March	Convoys HX 229/SC 122		Germans under Dönitz	Allies (British, Americans, Canadians, & Belgians)	22 ships and one U-boat sunk in largest North Atlantic U-boat wolfpack attack
1943	World War II	25 March-10 April	Convoy HX 231		Inconclusive: Germans under Dönitz vs Allies (British, Norwegians, & Canadians)		Eleven German U-boats sink six Allied merchant ships of 86 in a wolfpack attack; two U-boats are sunk and convoy reaches its destination
1943	World War II	26 March	Battle of the Komandorski Islands	(Russia)	Americans under McMorris	Japanese under Hosogaya	Americans intercept Japanese Aleutian Islands convoy
1943	World War II	28 March	Convoy RS 3	(Spain)	Germans under Dönitz	British & Americans (air support)	Germans destroy Convoy RS 3
1943	World War II	1–16 April	Operation I-Go	(Solomon Islands) / (Papua New Guinea)	Inconclusive: Japanese under Yamamoto and Kusaka vs Allies (Americans, Australians, & New Zealanders) under Halsey and MacArthur		Japanese launch aerial counteroffensive against Allies in the Solomon Islands, sinking a small number of ships
1943	World War II	16 April	Battle of the Cigno Convoy	(Italy)	Italians	British	Italians fight off British attack
1943	World War II	29 April—6 May	Convoy ONS 5		British & Canadians (air support)	Germans under Dönitz	Twelve ships and six U-boats sunk in last major North Atlantic U-boat wolfpack attack
1943	World War II	30 April—1 May	Convoy TS 37	(Sierra Leone)	Germans under Dönitz and Henke (U-515)	British under Pegram and Gill	Seven Allied merchant ships
1943	World War II	3-4 May	Battle of the Campobasso Convoy	(Tunisia)	British under Holland-Martin	Italians under Marotta	British destroyers sink Italian transport and destroyer
1943	World War II	9-13 May	Convoy HX 237		Inconclusive: Germans under Dönitz vs Allies (British, Americans, Canadians, & Norwegians)		Three Allied merchant ships and three German U-boats are sunk
1943	World War II	11-13 May	Convoy SC 129	(Portugal)	British	Germans under Dönitz	Three U-boats sunk
1943	World War II	14 May	Attack on AHS Centaur	(Australia)	Japanese (I-177)	Australians (Centaur)	Japanese submarine sink Australian hospital ship with a heavy loss of life
1943	World War II	15 May	Sinking of U-176	(Cuba)	Cubans	Germans (U-176)	U-176 is sunk off Cuba
1943	World War II	18-20 May	Convoy SC 130		British & Canadians	Germans under Dönitz	Three U-boats sunk in North Atlantic
1943	World War II	15-20 June	Convoy GP55	(Australia)	Japanese (I-174)	Australians & Americans (Portmar and LST-469)	One Allied transport ship and one Allied LST are damaged
1943	World War II	6 July	Battle of Kula Gulf	(Solomon Islands)	Inconclusive: Japanese under Akiyama and Americans under Ainsworth and Hayler		
1943	World War II	8-12 July	Convoy Faith		Germans	British & Americans (air support)	German aircraft attack Allied convoy, sinking two Allied troopships with heavy casualties
1943	World War II	9 July-17 August	Allied Invasion of Sicily	(Italy)	Americans, British, Canadians, Australians, & Indians	Italians & Germans	Allied amphibious assault on Sicily
1943	World War II	10-12 July	Battle of Gela	(Italy)	Americans & British	Italians & Germans	Allies engage Italian coastal batteries during the Allied Invasion of Sicily
1943	World War II	12-13 July	Battle of Kolombangara	(Solomon Islands)	Japanese under Isaki	Americans/New Zealanders under Ainsworth	
1943	World War II	17-18 July	Operation Scylla	(Italy)	Italians (Scipione Africano)	British	Italians repel attack by British torpedo boats, sinking one
1943	World War II	31 July	Action of 31 July	(Brazil)	Americans and Brazilians	Germans (U-199)	U-199 is sunk off Rio de Janeiro
1943	World War II	1 Aug 1943—4 Oct 1944	Kara Sea U-boat campaign	(Russia)	Germans vs Soviets		German U-boats attempt to disrupt Soviet shipping in the Kara Sea
1943	World War II	6-7 Aug	Battle of Vella Gulf	(Solomon Islands)	Americans under Moosbrugger	Japanese under Sugiura	American destroyers intercept the "Tokyo Express" and sink 3 Japanese destroyers
1943	World War II	17-18 Aug	Battle off Horaniu	(Solomon Islands)	Japanese under Ijuin	Americans under Ryan	Japanese convoy evacuation succeeds
1943	World War II	29 Aug	Battle of Isefjord	(Denmark)	Germans	Danish (Niels Juel)	Niels Juel' is sunk while attempting to flee to Sweden
1943	World War II	8 Sep	Operation Zitronella	(Norway)	Germans under Hüffmeier (Tirpitz and Scharnhorst)	Free Norway under Bredsdorff	Germans destroy Norwegian coastal defenses in Svalbard
1943	World War II	8 Sep-22 Nov	Dodecanese campaign	(Greece)	Germans	Italians, British, Greeks, & Polish under Campioni	Germans invade and occupy the Italian Dodecanese islands; Allied and Italian fleets take heavy losses
1943	World War II	9 Sep	Action off Bastia	(France)	Italians under di Cossato	Germans	All ships in the German auxiliary fleet were sunk
1943	World War II	9 Sep	Battle of the Straits of Bonifacio	(Italy) / (France)	Germans	Italians (Roma)	Main Italian fleet attempts to sail to Sardinia following Armistice; Roma is sunk by German aircraft with a Fritz X radio-controlled bomb
1943	World War II	19-23 Sep	Convoys ONS 18/ON 202		British & Canadians	Germans under Dönitz	German U-boats simultaneously attack two convoys but are defeated
1943	World War II	28 Sep-12 Oct	Convoy SC 143		British, Polish, & Canadians (air support)	Germans	Allies sink three U-boats after Germans attack the convoy
1943	World War II	6 Oct	Naval Battle of Vella Lavella	(Solomon Islands)	Japanese under Ijuin	Americans under Walker	
1943	World War II	15-18 Oct	Convoys ONS 20/ON 206		British & Canadians	Germans under Dönitz	Only one Allied ship is lost during a large U-boat attack
1943	World War II	22-23 Oct	Battle of Sept-Îles	(France)	Germans under Kohlauf	British	
1943	World War II	26-29 Oct	Convoy ON 207		British & Canadians	Germans under Dönitz	Three U-boats sunk by a combination of air and naval support in the North Atlantic
1943	World War II	27-31 Oct	Convoy SL 138/MKS 28		British	Germans under Dönitz	One ship and one U-boat destroyed in North Atlantic
1943	World War II	2 Nov	Battle of Empress Augusta Bay	(Papua New Guinea)	Americans under Merrill and Burke	Japanese unter Omori and Ijuin	
1943	World War II	6 Nov	Action off Cape Bougaroun	(Algeria)	Germans	Americans, British, & Greeks	Several Allied ships are sunk by Germans
1943	World War II	13 Nov	Action of 13 November	(Malaysia)	British under Wingfield (Taurus)	Japanese (I-34)	I-34 is sunk
1943	World War II	18-21 Nov	Convoy SL 139/MKS 30		British & Canadians (air support)	Germans under Dönitz	One ship and three U-boats sunk
1943	World War II	24 Nov—5 Dec	Convoy SL 140/MKS 31		British & Americans	Germans	Allie sink six U-boats
1943	World War II	26 Nov	Battle of Cape St. George	(Papua New Guinea)	Americans under Burke	Japanese under Kagawa	American destroyers intercept the "Tokyo Express" and sink three Japanese destroyers
1943	World War II	13 Dec	Action off Silba	(Croatia)	British	Croatians (Zniam)	Three British torpedo boats attack and permanently disable Zniam
1943	World War II	20-30 Dec	Convoy JW 55B	(Norway)	Germans (Scharnhorst) vs British, Canadians, & Norwegians		Prelude to the Battle of the North Cape
1943	World War II	26 Dec	Battle of North Cape	(Norway)	British, Canadians, & Norwegians under Fraser	Germans under Bey	
1943	World War II	26-27 Dec	Operation Stonewall	(France) (Spain)	Allies - Americans, British, New Zealanders, Free French, Italians, Canadians (air support), Australians (air support), Brazilians (air support), & Czechoslovaks (air support) under Leatham	Germans under Dönitz	Allied ships and aircraft sink three German destroyers in the Bay of Biscay
1944	World War II	11 Jan	Action of 11 January	(Malaysia)	British under Bennington (Tally-Ho)	Japanese (Kuma and Urunami)	Tally-Ho sinks Kuma off Penang
1944	World War II	12-27 Jan	Convoy JW 56A		Inconclusive: Germans vs British, Soviets, & Norwegians		German U-boats sink three ships and damage one escort but 12 ships arrived at their destination, making the journey a success
1944	World War II	12 Feb	Action off Visakhapatnam	(India)	Indians & Australians	Japanese	Indian sloop HMIS Jumna and Australian corvettes HMAS Launceston & HMAS Ipswich sink Japanese submarine Ro-110 with depth charges.
1944	World War II	14 Feb	Action of 14 February	(Malaysia)	British under Bennington (Tally-Ho)	Germans (UIT-23)	Tally-Ho sinks UIT-23 off Penang
1944	World War II	17 Feb	Operation Hailstone	(Federated States of Micronesia)	Americans under Mitscher	Japanese under Kobayashi	Allied fleet attacks former Japanese naval stronghold at Truk Lagoon; Japanese defenders lose many aircraft and merchant ships
1944	World War II	29 Feb	Battle of Ist	(Croatia)	Free French	Germans	Free French destroyers intercept German convoy and sink a corvette and freighter
1944	World War II	1-16 March	Second Indian Ocean Raid		Inconclusive: Japanese under Sakonju (Tone) vs British under Somerville (Behar)		Behar is sunk; the crew is later executed aboard Tone
1944	World War II	29 March	Action of 29 March	(Colombia)	Colombians (Caldas)	Germans (U-154)	U-154 attacks a convoy but Caldas damages her
1944	World War II	19 April	Action of 19 April	(Norway)	Norwegians (Ula)	Germans (U-974)	U-974 sunk
1944	World War II	22 April—31 May	Convoy UGS-40		Americans, British, & Free French	Germans	German aircraft attack convoy in Mediterranean, but fail to score a single hit; Allies suffer no losses, while Germany loses 19 aircraft
1944	World War II	26 April	Action of 26 April	(France)	British & Canadians (Black Prince, Ashanti, Athabaskan, Haida and Huron)	Germans (T24, T27 and T29)	T29 is sunk
1944	World War II	28 April	Battle of Lyme Bay	(England)	Germans under Klug	British and Americans	German E-boats raid Lyme Bay and sink two LSTs
1944	World War II	6 May	Action of 6 May	(Cape Verde)	Americans (Block Island and Buckley)	Germans (U-66)	U-66 is sunk by aircraft from USS Block Island (CVE-21) and rammed by USS Buckley (DE-51)
1944	World War II	13 May	Action of 13 May	(Portugal)	Americans	Japanese (Ro-501)	Ro-501 is sunk off the Azores
1944	World War II	17 May	Operation Transom	(Indonesia)	Allies (Americans, British, Australians, New Zealanders, Dutch, & Free French	Japanese	Joint Allied-carrier operations destroy Japanese oil refineries
1944	World War II	4 June	Capture of U-505	(Cape Verde)	Americans (Guadalcanal)	Germans (U-505)	U-505 is captured
1944	World War II	6 June	Invasion of Normandy	(France)	Allies - Americans, British, Canadians, Free French, Norwegians, Polish, Greeks, Dutch, Australians (air support), & Southern Rhodesians (air support) under Ramsay	Germans	Allied fleets launch the largest amphibious invasion ever conducted in occupied France. Allied warships battle German coastal defenses and torpedo boats, losing several warships in the invasion.
1944	World War II	6 June	Capture of U-744		British and Canadians	Germans (U-744)	U-744 is captured and later scuttled
1944	World War II	9 June	Battle of Ushant	(France)	British, Canadians, & Polish (10th destroyer flotilla)	Germans under von Bechtolsheim (8th destroyer flotilla)	
1944	World War II	19 June	Battle of the Philippine Sea	(Philippines) / (United States)	Americans under Spruance and Mitscher	Japanese under Ozawa, Kurita, Takagi and Kakuta	US invasion of Saipan initiates the largest aircraft carrier battle in history; this battle included the air conflict nicknamed The Great Marianas Turkey Shoot
1944	World War II	19-20 June	Battle of Nerva Island	(Finland)	Soviets	Germans (T30 and T31)	Soviets repel German attack; T31 is sunk
1944	World War II	24 June	Action off Murter Island	(Croatia)	British	Germans & Croatians (T7)	T7 is damaged and beached off Murter Island
1944	World War II	17 July	Action of 17 July	(Malaysia)	British under King (Telemachus)	Japanese (I-166)	I-166 is sunk off Penang
1944	World War II	17 July	Operation Mascot	(Norway)	Germans under Junge (Tirpitz)	British under Moore	Royal Navy launches carrier assault against Tirpitz, but fails
1944	World War II	17 July—3 Aug	Convoy HX 300		Allies (Americans, British, Canadians, & Norwegians)	Germans	Largest convoy of the war, despite German U-boat attacks, Allies successfully defend merchant ships with no losses.
1944	World War II	12 Aug	Action of 12 August 1944	(Seychelles)	Indians & British	Germans	Indian sloop HMIS Godavari & British frigate HMS Findhorn sink German submarine U-198 with depth charges.
1944	World War II	15 Aug	Battle of Port Cros	(France)	Americans (Somers)	Germans (UJ6081 and SG21)	UJ6081 and SG21 sunk
1944	World War II	15 Aug—14 Sep	Operation Dragoon	(France)	Allies - Americans, British, Canadians, Greeks, Free French, Australians (air support), & South Africans (air support) under Hewitt	Germans	Combined Allied fleet launches amphibious assault resulting in Germany's withdrawal from most of Southern France
1944	World War II	18-19 Aug	Convoy Hi-71	(Philippines)	Americans under Donaho	Japanese (Taiyō)	Americans attack Japanese convoy and sink nine ships and damage another three
1944	World War II	7 Sep	Shin'yo Maru Incident	(Philippines)	Americans (Paddle)	Japanese (Shin'yo Maru)	Americans sink Shin'yo Maru, killing 688 Allied POWs
1944	World War II	15 Sep	Operation Tanne Ost	(Russia)	Finnish	Germans	Germans attempt to capture Suursaari Island from Finland, but are repelled. Starts the Lapland War.
1944	World War II	1-8 Oct	Battle of Tornio	(Finland)	Finnish	Germans	Finnish gunboats engage German coastal batteries and cover troop landings.
1944	World War II	6 Oct	Action of 6 October	(Indonesia)	Dutch (Zwaardvisch)	Germans (U-168)	U-168 is sunk in the Java Sea
1944	World War II	12-16 Oct	Formosa Air Battle	(Taiwan)	Americans under Halsey and Mitscher	Japanese under Kusaka and Fukudome	American carrier-based aircraft and Japanese naval aircraft battle over Formosa
1944	World War II	23 Oct	Battle of Maun Island	(Croatia)	Germans	Yugoslavs	Yugoslav Partisan Navy engages two German submarine chasers in a minor skirmish; Yugoslavs retreat after taking damage
1944	World War II	23-26 Oct	Battle of Leyte Gulf	(Philippines)	Americans & Australians under Halsey, Kinkaid, Sprague, Oldendorf and Collins	Japanese under Kurita, Nishimura, Shima, Ozawa and Seki	US invasion of the Philippines produces a decisive battle with the Japanese fleet including four main actions – the Sibuyan Sea, Surigao Straits, off Samar and Cape Engano. First use of Kamikaze tactics by the Japanese.
1944	World War II	1 Nov	Battle of Pag Island	(Croatia)	British under Giles	Germans	Allies sink a destroyer and two corvettes
1944	World War II	9 Nov—21 Dec	Battle of Ormoc Bay	(Philippines)	Americans under MacArthur	Japanese under Yamashita	American destroyers attack sink several Japanese destroyers and merchant ships
1944	World War II	10 Nov	Action of 10 November	(Indonesia)	Americans (Flounder)	Germans (U-537)	U-537 is sunk in the Java Sea
1944	World War II	15-18 Nov	Convoy Hi-81		Americans under Underwood and Fluckey	Japanese (Shin'yō and Akitsu Maru)	Shinyo and Akitsu Maru are sunk
1944	World War II	24 Dec	Convoy WEP 3	(France)	British & Belgians (Léopoldville)	Germans (U-486)	Léopoldville is torpedoed and sunk with a loss of 819 lives
1945	World War II	10–20 Jan	South China Sea raid		Americans under Halsey and McCain	Japanese under Terauchi	Japanese shipping is disrupted in the South China Sea
1945	World War II	27/28 Jan	Action of 28 January	(Norway)	Inconclusive: British under Dalrymple-Hamilton vs Germans		
1945	World War II	9 Feb	Sinking of U-864	(Norway)	British under Launders	Germans under Wolfram (U-864)	
1945	World War II	14 March	Sinking of U-174	(Canada)	South Africans (Natal)	Germans (U-174)	U-174 is sunk; no survivors
1945	World War II	18 March	Battle of the Ligurian Sea	(Italy)	British under Hetherington (Lookout and Meteor)	Germans	British sink two German destroyer escorts
1945	World War II	19 March	First Bombing of Kure	(Japan)	Americans	Japanese	American carrier-based aircraft damage Japanese warships at anchor in Kure
1945	World War II	1 April—25 May	Battle of Okinawa	(Japan)	Allies (Americans, British, Canadians, Australians, & New Zealanders) under Spruance, Turner, Rawlings and Mitscher	Japanese under Toyoda and Ōru (Yamato)	The Japanese lose their last significant naval force; large scale systematic kamikaze operations conducted by Japanese air forces
1945	World War II	6 April-22 June	Operation Kikusui	(Japan)	Americans, British, & Australians under Mitscher	Japanese under Ugaki	Kamikaze campaign against Allied warships begins
1945	World War II	12 April	Capture of U-1024		British (Loch Glendhu and Loch More)	Germans (U-1024)	Two British frigates capture German submarine U-1024 in the Irish Sea
1945	World War II	12 April—7 May	Operation Teardrop		British & Norwegians under Ingram	Germans under Godt	Anti-submarine warfare campaign along the North American east coast
1945	World War II	16 April	Action of 16 April	(Italy)	Italians	French (Trombe)	Trombe is destroyed beyond repair off Liguria
1945	World War II	23 April	Action of 23 April		Americans (Besugo)	Germans (U-183)	U-183 is sunk in the Java Sea
1945	World War II	5-6 May	Battle of Point Judith	(United States)	Americans	Germans (U-853)	U-853 is sunk in the Long Island Sound
1945	World War II	7-8 May	Actions of 7-8 May 1945		British & Norwegians	Germans (U-320)	U-320 sunk, becoming the last U-boat to sunk; Nazi Germany surrenders just hours later
1945	World War II	15-16 May	Battle of the Malacca Strait	(Malaysia)	British under Power	Japanese under Fukudome (Haguro)	Haguro is sunk
1945	World War II	8 June	Action of 8 June	(Indonesia)	British under Hezlet (Trenchant and Stygian)	Japanese (Ashigara and Kamikaze)	Ashigara is sunk
1945	World War II	18 July	Attack on Yokosuka	(Japan)	Americans & British under Halsey, McCain and Rawlings	Japanese	Allied naval aircraft bomb and damage Japanese warships in Yokosuka
1945	World War II	22–23 July	Battle of Sagami Bay	(Japan)	Americans	Japanese	American destroyers intercept Japanese convoy fleeing Tokyo Bay; last surface battle of the war.
1945	World War II	24 July	Action of 24 July	(Philippines)	Japanese (I-53)	Americans (Underhill)	Underhill is sunk by Japanese kaiten (suicide-torpedoes)
1945	World War II	24–28 July	Second Bombing of Kure	(Japan)	British and Americans under Halsey	Japanese	Allied naval aircraft sink all remaining Japanese capital ships in Kure
1945	World War II	July—Aug	Allied naval bombardments of Japan	(Japan)	Americans, British, & New Zealanders	Japanese	Allied warships bombard strategic sites on the Japanese coast
1945	World War II	4-12 September	Operation Tiderace	(Singapore)	British, Australians, & Free French	Japanese	Bloodless reclamation of Singapore
1946		18-25 Feb	Royal Indian Navy mutiny	(India) / (Bahrain) / (Hong Kong) / (Yemen)	Colonial British government	Indians	Indians fail to achieve independence from Britain peacefully
1946	Indonesian National Revolution	5 April	Battle of Bali Strait	(Indonesia)	Indonesians	Dutch	First amphibious battle of the revolution
1946	Cold War	15 May—13 Nov	Corfu Channel incident	(Albania)	British vs Albanians		British naval vessels are attacked by Albanian artillery fortifications, causing the Corfu Channel case and severing diplomatic relations until 1991
1946	Indonesian National Revolution	7-8 June	Capture of Patrol Boat No. 36	(Indonesia)	Dutch (Van Kinsbergen)	Indonesians (Patrol Boat No. 36)	Van Kinsbergen captures Patrol Boat No. 36 off Jepara.
1947	Paraguayan Civil War	27 April	Action of 27 April	(Paraguay)	Paraguayan loyalists	Paraguayan rebels (Humaitá and Paraguay)	Humaitá is disabled by loyalist aircraft and both ships are later recaptured by loyalist warships
1947	Indonesian National Revolution	5 January	Battle of the Cirebon Sea	(Indonesia)	Dutch	Indonesians	Small Indonesian squadron engages Dutch destroyer HNLMS Kortenaer, results in loss of training ship KRI Gadjah Mada.
1948	First Arab–Israeli War	21 June	Altalena Affair	(Israel)	Israel Defense Forces	Irgun (Altalena)	Altalena is shelled to prevent it from delivering its cargo of weapons
1948	First Arab–Israeli War	19 Oct	Naval battle near Majdal	(Israel)	Israelis vs Egyptians		
1948	First Arab–Israeli War	22 Oct	Sinking of the Emir Farouk	(Palestine)	Israelis	Egyptians	Emir Farouk is sunk off Gaza
1949	Chinese Civil War	20 April—30 July	Amethyst Incident	(China)	Chinese	British (Amethyst, Consort, London, Black Swan and Concord)	British warships come under fire by Communist Chinese coastal artillery, forcing more Royal Navy ships to come to their rescue and resulting in Britain withdrawing from the Yangtze River and mainland China
1949	Chinese Civil War	25 Oct	Battle of Guningtou	(Taiwan)	Taiwanese	Chinese	
1950	Korean War	25-26 June	Battle of Korea Strait	(South Korea)	South Koreans (PC-823)	North Koreans	North Korean steamer is sunk
1950	Korean War	2 July	Battle of Chumonchin Chan	(Japan)	United Nations	North Koreans	US and British cruisers intercept Korean People's Navy convoy
1950	Korean War	10 Sep	Battle of Haeju	(North Korea)	United Nations	North Koreans	South Korean patrol ship sinks a North Korean minelayer
1950	Korean War	10-19 Sep	Battle of Incheon	(South Korea)	South Korea and United Nations	North Koreans	UN Command amphibious invasion; start of the UN offensive into North Korea and the withdrawal of South Koreans from North Korea
1951	Korean War	16 Feb 1951—27 July 1953	Blockade of Wonsan	(North Korea)	United Nations	North Koreans and Chinese	Longest naval blockade in modern history at 861 days
1951	Korean War	12 June	USS Walke incident	(North Korea)	North Koreans	Americans (Walke)	Walke is damaged by two North Korean submarines
1951		29 June	Manhattan Rebellion	(Thailand)	Government of Phibun	Rebels from the Royal Thai Navy (Sri Ayudhya)	Sri Ayudhya is sunk by coastal guns and air strikes during a failed coup
1951	Korean War	17-18 July	Battle of the Buzz Saw	(North Korea)	Americans (O'Brien, Blue, Alfred A. Cunningham and Frank E. Evans)	North Koreans	
1951	Korean War	28-30 Sep	Battle of the Han River	(South Korea)	Australians (Murchison)	Chinese	Australians attack Chinese coastal batteries
1953	Chinese Civil War	16-18 July	Dongshan Island Campaign	(China)	Chinese Communists under Hu	Chinese Nationalists under Ye and You	Taiwanese fleet and amphibious forces fail to retake Dongshan Island from China
1954	Chinese Civil War	15 May	Dongshan Island Campaign	(China)	Chinese vs Taiwanese		Two Chinese gunboats engage a Taiwanese fleet, damaging a destroyer escort
1954	Chinese Civil War	16 May	Dongshan Island Campaign	(China)	Chinese vs Taiwanese (Tai Ho)		Tai Ho is damaged, forcing her to retreat
1954	First Taiwan Strait Crisis	14 Nov	Sinking of ROCS Tai Ping	(China)	Chinese Communists	Chinese Nationalists (Tai Ping)	Tai Ping is sunk off the Dachen Islands
1955	Revolución Libertadora	19 Sep	Bombardment of Mar del Plata	(Argentina)	Argentine rebels (9 de Julio) vs Argentine loyalists		Rebels launch a naval attack on Mar del Plata's army garrison
1956	Suez Crisis	30 Oct	Battle off Haifa	(Israel)	Israelis and French	Egyptians (Ibrahim el-Awal)	Ibrahim el-Awal is captured
1956	Suez Crisis	31 Oct	Sinking of the Domiat		British (Newfoundland and Diana)	Egyptians (Domiat)	Domiat sunk in the northern Red Sea
1957	Cuban Revolution	5 September	Cienfuegos uprising	(Cuba)	Cuban government	dissident sailors and the 26th of July Movement	sailors from the Cienfuegos naval garrison mutinied seizing the naval station , government aircraft bombed them , rebels fled or were killed.
1958	Second Taiwan Strait Crisis	24 Aug	First Battle of Jinmen Island	(Taiwan)	Chinese	Taiwanese	Chinese attack a convoy off Jinmen Island, sinking a transport and damaging a landing ship
1958	Second Taiwan Strait Crisis	24 Sep	Battle of Dongding Island	(Taiwan)	Taiwanese	Chinese	Taiwanese prevent Chinese from landing on Dongding Island; one Taiwanese landing ship is sunk, while another is damaged
1958	Second Taiwan Strait Crisis	2 Sep	Second Battle of Jinmen Island	(Taiwan)	Chinese vs Taiwanese convoy		Off Jinmen Island; Chinese lose two torpedo boats and damage a submarine chaser
1958	Guatemala–Mexico relations	30 Dec 1958—15 Sep 1959	Mexico–Guatemala conflict	(Guatemala)	Ceasefire between Guatemalans and Mexicans		Guatemalan Air Force attacks Mexican civilian fishing boats in Guatemalan territory
1961	Opposition to Estado Novo regime in Portugal	22 January -2 February	Santa Maria hijacking	(Brazil)	Estado Novo (Portugal) / US Navy	Portuguese rebels	One Portuguese officer killed and several others wounded, US Navy surrounded the ship ending the plan of the hijackers to flee to Angola, hijackers surrendered to Brazilian authorities in exchange for political asylum.
1961	Lobster War	Feb 1961—10 Dec 1964	Lobster War	(Brazil)	Brazilians vs French		France and Brazil argue over whether lobsters swim or crawl, which would dictate whether France was fishing in Brazilian waters; resulted in the Law of the Sea Treaty
1961	Cold War	17-20 April	Bay of Pigs Invasion	(Cuba)	Cubans	Americans and Cuban exiles	Failed attempt to invade Castro's Cuba
1961	Cold War	19-23 July	Bizerte crisis	(Tunisia)	French	Tunisians	Failed attempt to blockade a French naval base in Bizerte
1961	Annexation of Goa	18 Dec	Naval battle at Mormugao harbour	(India)	Indians (Betwa and Beas)	Portuguese (Afonso de Albuquerque)	Afonso de Albuquerque is sunk
1961	Annexation of Goa	18 Dec	Naval Action at Daman	(India)	Portuguese (Antares) vs Indians		Portuguese evade Indian air strikes
1961	Annexation of Goa	18 Dec	Naval Action at Diu	(India)	Indians (Delhi)	Portuguese (Vega)	Vega sunk
1962	West New Guinea dispute	15 Jan	Battle of Arafura Sea	(Indonesia)	Dutch	Indonesians under Sudarso	Dutch repel Indonesian attack
1962		2-6 June	El Porteñazo	(Venezuela)	Venezuelan government	Venezuelan military rebels	Rebellion Venezuelan warships exchange fire on loyalist positions

=== Later 20th century ===
Year	War	Date	Battle	Loc.	Winners	Losers	Notes
1964	Vietnam War	2 Aug	Gulf of Tonkin Incident	(Vietnam)	Americans (Maddox and Ticonderoga) vs North Vietnamese		Lead to the Gulf of Tonkin Resolution and the escalation of the Vietnam War; later found to be misrepresented by the U.S. government
1964	Cyprus problem	6 Aug	Battle of Tillyria	(Cyprus)	Turkish Cypriots	Greek Cypriots (Phaethon)	Cypriot patrol ships engage Turkish Cypriot militia before being sunk by Turkish fighter jets
1964	Indonesia–Malaysia confrontation	27 Aug—10 Sep	Sunda Straits Crisis	(Indonesia)	Inconclusive: British under Begg, Thorneycroft and Mountbatten vs Indonesians under Sukarno, Subandrio and Suwito		Peaceful resolution; no losses on either side
1964	Indonesia–Malaysia confrontation	13 Dec	Action of 13 December	(Singapore)	Australians (Teal)	Indonesians	
1965	Vietnam War	16 Feb	Vũng Rô Bay incident	(Vietnam)	South Vietnamese	North Vietnamese	North Vietnamese fail to secretly invade South Vietnam's water to support Viet Cong escalating the war
1965	Project National Glory	1 May	Battle of Dong-Yin	(Taiwan)	Taiwanese (Dong Jiang) vs Chinese		Taiwanese repel an attack by eight Chinese gunboats, sinking four of them and damaging two
1965	Project National Glory	6 Aug	Battle of Dongshan	(Taiwan)	Chinese	Taiwanese (Jiang Men and Zhang Jiang)	Zhang Jiang and Jiang Men are sunk
1965	Project National Glory	13-14 Nov	Battle of East Chongwu	(Taiwan)	Chinese	Taiwanese (Lin Huai and Shan Hai)	Lin Huai is forced to run aground due to damage sustained in battle, while Shan Hai escapes
1965	Second Indo-Pakistani War	7-8 Sep	Operation Dwarka	(India)	Pakistanis vs Indians		First Pakistan Navy engagement of the war
1967	Six-Day War	8 June	USS Liberty incident	(Egypt)	Israelis vs Americans under McGonagle (Liberty)		Israeli Navy pioneers anti-ship use of napalm to disable American spy ship
1967	War of Attrition	11 July	Battle of Rumani Coast	(Egypt)	Israelis (Eilat)	Egyptians	Two Egyptian torpedo boats sunk
1967	Nigerian Civil War	17-23 Oct	Operation Tiger Claw	(Nigeria)	Nigerians	Biafrans	
1967	War of Attrition	21 Oct	Sinking of the Eliat	(Egypt)	Egyptians	Israelis (Eilat)	Eilat sunk in the first combat use of P-15 Termit surface-to-surface missiles
1968	Korean DMZ Conflict	23 Jan	Pueblo incident	(Japan)	North Koreans under Kim	Americans under Bucher (Pueblo)	North Koreans capture Pueblo
1968	Vietnam War	1 March	Action of 1 March	(Vietnam)	Americans and South Vietnamese	North Vietnamese	Four North Vietnamese naval trawlers sunk
1970	War of Attrition	16 May	Sinking of the El Qaher	(Egypt)	Israelis	Egyptians (El Qaher)	El Qaher is sunk off Berenice
1970	Guinea-Bissau War of Independence	22 Nov	Operation Green Sea	(Guinea-Bissau)	Portugal	Guinea-Bissau	Portuguese forces manage to destroy 5 Guinean supply ships and numerous government buildings and rescue POWs but fail to overthrow the government.
1971		30 Nov	Seizure of Abu Musa and the Greater and Lesser Tunbs	(United Arab Emirates) / (Iran)	Pahlavi Iran	Emirate of Sharjah and Emirate of Ras Al Khaimah	Iranian navy captures the Islands of Abu Musa and Greater and Lesser Tunbs.
1971	Indo-Pakistani War of 1971	4-5 Dec	Operation Trident	(Pakistan)	Indians under Rao and Yadav	Pakistanis under Lodhi	
1971	Indo-Pakistani War of 1971	8-9 Dec	Operation Python	(Pakistan)	Indians under Kuruvila	Pakistanis under Ahmed	
1971	Indo-Pakistani War of 1971	9 Dec	Sinking of Khukri		Pakistanis (Hangor)	Indians (Khukri)	Khukri is sunk
1972	Vietnam War	30 March—1 May	First Battle of Quảng Trị	(Vietnam)	North Vietnamese	South Vietnamese	Americans engage in tank and artillery duals at and below DMZ and in defense of Đông Hà Bridge
1972	Vietnam War	19 April	Battle of Đồng Hới	(Vietnam)	North Vietnamese	Americans	
1972	Vietnam War	9 May	Operation Pocket Money	(Vietnam)	Americans under Cooper	North Vietnamese	Americans successfully blockade North Vietnamese at Hai Phong
1972	Vietnam War	10 May	Operation Custom Tailor	(Vietnam)	Americans	North Vietnamese	Americans successfully mine the entrance of the harbour in Hai Phong
1973	Yom Kippur War	7 Oct	Battle of Latakia	(Syria)	Israelis under Barkai	Syrians	
1973	Yom Kippur War	7 Oct	Battle of Marsa Talamat	(Egypt)	Israelis	Egyptians under Zikry	Egyptian patrol boat sunk
1973	Yom Kippur War	8-9 Oct	Battle of Baltim	(Egypt)	Israelis	Egyptians	
1973	Yom Kippur War	11 Oct	Battle of Latakia	(Syria)	Syrians	Israelis under Barkai	
1974	Vietnam War	19 Jan	Battle of the Paracel Islands	(China)	Chinese	Vietnamese	Chinese take full control of the Paracels Islands
1974	Turkish invasion of Cyprus	20-22 July	Battle of Pentemili beachhead	(Cyprus)	Turkish	Cypriots	Two Cypriot torpedo boats are sunk trying to intercept Turkish amphibious assault
1975	Vietnam War	April	East Sea Campaign	(Vietnam)	South Vietnamese under Chung	North Vietnamese and Viet Cong	Series of clashes that led to the North Vietnamese capture of the Spratly Islands
1975	Cambodian Civil War	12-15 May	Mayaguez Incident	(Cambodia)	Americans (Mayaguez, Harold E. Holt)	Khmer Rouge	Americans rescue Mayaguez and surviving crew after the cargo ship is seized
1977	Eritrean War of Independence	4 March	Sinking of the P-11	(Ethiopia)	Eritrean People's Liberation Front	Ethiopians (P-11)	P-11 is sunk
1978	Namibian War of Independence	Nov—Dec	Operation Lark	(Mozambique)	Robert Mugabe	South Africans	Failed attempt to assassinate Robert Mugabe
1980		10 May	Sinking of the HMBS Flamingo	(The Bahamas)	Cubans	Bahamians (Flamingo)	Flamingo is sunk by two Cuban MIG-21s
1980	Iran–Iraq War	27-28 Nov	Operation Morvarid	(Iraq)	Iranians under Afzali	Iraqis	Destruction of 80% of the Iraqi Navy
1981	The Troubles	6 Feb	Sinking of the coaster ship Nellie M	(Republic of Ireland)	Irish Republicans	British	An IRA active service unit hijack a lifeboat at Moville and sink a small cargo ship with an explosive charge
1982	The Troubles	23 Feb	Sinking of the coaster ship St. Bedan	(Republic of Ireland)	Irish Republicans	British	An IRA active service unit hijack a lifeboat at Moville and sink a small cargo ship with an explosive charge
1982	Falklands War	3 April	Invasion of South Georgia	(South Georgia and the South Sandwich Islands)	Argentines	British under Mills	
1982	Falklands War	25 April	Operation Paraquet	(South Georgia and the South Sandwich Islands)	British under Young and Sheridan	Argentines (Santa Fe)	Santa Fe is severely damaged, sunk and later scuttled
1982	Falklands War	2 May	Sinking of the ARA General Belgrano	(South Georgia and the South Sandwich Islands)	British (Conqueror)	Argentines (General Belgrano)	General Belgrano is torpedoed and sunk
1982	Falklands War	3 May	Attack on the ARA Alferez Sobral		British	Argentine (Alferez Sobral)	Two British Westland Lynx HAS.Mk.2/3 helicopters attack Alferez Sobral
1982	Falklands War	4 May	Sinking of HMS Sheffield		Argentines	British (Sheffield)	Fighter jets sink Sheffield with an Exocet missile
1982	Falklands War	21-25 May	Battle of San Carlos	(Falkland Islands)	British under Woodward, Clapp and Thompson (Coventry, Ardent and Antelope)	Argentines under Menendez and Crespo	Coventry, Ardent and Antelope are sunk during a British landing on the shores of San Carlos Water; British successfully establish a beachhead
1982	Falklands War	23 May	Battle of Seal Cove	(Falkland Islands)	Argentines	British	Minor naval clash; Argentine coaster evades capture by two British ships by running aground
1982	Falklands War	25 May	Sinking of SS Atlantic Conveyor		Argentines	British (Atlantic Conveyor)	Atlantic Conveyor is sunk by two Argentine Exocet missiles fired from fighter jets
1982	Falklands War	8 June	Bluff Cove air attacks	(Falkland Islands)	Argentines under Crespo, Menendez and Lombardo	British under Moore, Clapp, Thompson and Wilson (Sir Galahad and Sir Tristam)	Argentine aerial bombs destroy Sir Galahad and Sir Tristam; Sir Galad is scuttled on 21 June and Sir Tristam, though seriously damaged, later returns to service
1982	Falklands War	11-12 June	Battle of Two Sisters	(Falkland Islands)	British (Glamorgan)	Argentines	Glamorgan is struck and damaged by an Exocet missile fired from an Argentine land-base launcher
1982	1982 Lebanon War	16 June	Sinking of Transit	(Lebanon)	Israelis	Lebanese	Transit is sunk off Tripoli, Lebanon; of the 56 refugees en route to Larnaca, Cyprus, 25 are killed
1982	Iran–Iraq War	11 Sep	Sinking of Milanian and Kahnamoie		Iraqis	Iranians (Milanian and Kahnamoie)	Milanian and Kahnmoie are sunk by Exocet missiles
1983	Iran–Iraq War		Sinking of the Raffaello	(Iran)	Iraqis	Iranians (Raffaello)	Raffaello is partially sunk by an Exocet missile while in port in Bushehr
1984	South African Border War	15 July—7 Aug	Operation Nobilis	(Angola)	South Africans	Angolans	South African Navy destroys three Angolan missile boats in Luanda
1985	Arab–Israeli conflict	7-10 Oct	Achille Lauro hijacking	(Egypt)	Mixed result: Palestinian Liberation Front vs ? (Achille Lauro)		Members of the PLF hijack an Italian ship en route to Ashdod; causes the Crisis of Sigonella
1986	Cold War	24 March	Action in the Gulf of Sidra	(Libya)	Americans	Libyans	
1987	Iran–Iraq War	17 May	USS Stark incident		Iraqis	Americans (Stark)	Stark is severely damaged by missiles from Iraqi fighter jets
1987	Iran–Iraq War	24 July	Bridgeton incident	(Iran)	Iranians	Americans and Kuwaitians (Bridgeton)	American-escorted Kuwaitian convoy is attacked and Bridgeton is mined
1987	Iran–Iraq War	21 Sep	Operation Prime Chance		Americans	Iranians (Iran Ajr)	Iran Ajr is attacked and later scuttled
1987	Iran–Iraq War	16 Oct	Attack on the MV Sea Isle City	(Iraq)	Iranians	Kuwaitians (Sea Isle City)	Sea Isle City is severely damaged; 18 of her crew are wounded and her captain is blinded
1987	Iran–Iraq War	19 Oct	Operation Nimble Archer	(Iran)	Americans	Iranians	US fleet destroys two Iranian oil platforms in retaliation for attacking the Kuwaiti tanker Sea Isle City
1988	Third Indochina War	14 March	Johnson South Reef Skirmish	(China)	Chinese	Vietnamese	Three Vietnamese transports are sunk; Chinese establish control over Johnson South Reef
1988	Iran–Iraq War	18 April	Operation Praying Mantis	(Iran)	Americans under Less	Iranians under Malekzadegan	In the largest US naval engagement since World War II, the U.S. Navy retaliates for the mining of the USS Samuel B. Roberts during a patrol mission
1990	Eritrean War of Independence	Feb	Dahlak Islands Campaign	(Eritrea)	Eritreans	Ethiopians (F-1616)	F-1616 is damaged beyond repair and later scuttled
1990	Gulf War	2 Aug	Iraqi invasion of Kuwait	(Kuwait)	Iraqis	Kuwaitians	Most of the Kuwait Naval Force is destroyed by Iraqi air and naval forces, with surviving ships escaping to Bahrain
1990	The Troubles	6 Sep	RFA Fort Victoria bombing	(Northern Ireland)	Irish Republicans	British (Fort Victoria)	Fort Victoria bombed and heavily damaged while at dock at Harland & Wolff shipyard
1991	Gulf War	18-19 Jan	Battle of Ad-Dawrah	(Kuwait)	Coalition (Nicholas and Istiqal)	Iraqis	Coalition captures Iraqi oil platforms
1991	Gulf War	24-29 Jan	Battle of Qurah and Umm al Maradim	(Kuwait)	Coalition (Leftwich and Curts)	Iraqis	Four Iraqi warships sunk
1991	Gulf War	29 Jan—2 Feb	Battle of Bubiyan		Coalition	Iraqis	Bulk of the Iraqi Navy is destroyed
1991	Eritrean War of Independence	25 May	Battle of Assab	(Eritrea)	Eritreans	Ethiopians	Seven Ethiopian warships are sunk in port and the remaining warships flee before the city falls; this is the last combat action of the Ethiopian Navy before its dissolution due to Ethiopia becoming landlocked
1991	Croatian War of Independence	8 Nov	Action of Kopački Rit	(Croatia)	Yugoslavs (RML-308) vs Croatians		RML-308 is ambushed by Croatians off Kopacki Rit while chasing the Czechoslovak towboat Šariš, suspected of smuggling weapons into Croatia. Both ships are severely damaged and stranded, and two Yugoslav servicemen are killed.
1991	Croatian War of Independence	14-16 Nov	Battle of the Dalmatian Channels	(Croatia)	Croatians under Letica	Yugoslavs	Yugoslavs lose three ships
1992	Operation Holy Stone	11 Feb	Submarine incident off Kildin Island	(Russia)	Inconclusive: Americans (Baton Rouge) vs Russians (Kostroma)		Baton Rouge and Kostroma collide
1993	Operation Holy Stone	20 March	Submarine incident off Kola Peninsula	(Russia)	Inconclusive: Americans (Grayling) vs Russians (Novomoskovsk)		Grayling and Novomoskovsk collide; American surveillance on Russian naval bases is restricted
1993		26 March—2 April	1993 Cherbourg incident	(France)	French vs British		Fishing rights dispute
1994	Sri Lankan civil war	20 Sep	Sinking of the Sagarawardena	(Sri Lanka)	Liberation Tigers of Tamil Eelam	Sri Lankans (Sagarawardena)	LTTE suicide boats attack and sink Sagarawardena
1995	Sri Lankan civil war	19 April	Bombing of SLNS Sooraya and SLNS Ranasuru	(Sri Lanka)	Liberation Tigers of Tamil Eelam	Sri Lankans (Sooraya and Ranasuru)	LTTE frogmen place explosives on Sooraya and Ranasuru, sinking them both with heavy casualties
1995	Conflicts in the Horn of Africa	15-17 Dec	Hanish Islands conflict	(Yemen)	Eritreans	Yemenis	Eritreans launch amphibious assault on Hanish Islands and successfully occupy them until 1998
1996	Sri Lankan civil war	19 July	Battle of Mullaitivu	(Sri Lanka)	Liberation Tigers of Tamil Eelam under Soosai	Sri Lankans (Ranaviru)	Ranaviru is attacked and sunk, killing all but two of her crew
1998	Sri Lankan civil war	23 Feb		(Sri Lanka)	Sri Lankans vs Liberation Tigers of Tamil Eelam		More than 60 are killed
1998	Korean Conflict	22 June	Sokcho submarine incident	(South Korea)	South Koreans	North Koreans	
1998	Korean Conflict	17-18 Dec	Yosu submersible incident	(South Korea)	South Koreans	North Koreans	
1999	Korean Conflict	9-15 June	Battle of Yeonpyeong	(South Korea)	South Koreans	North Koreans	

== 21st century ==
Year	War	Date	Battle	Loc.	Winners	Losers	Notes
2000		24 April	Vereshchagino missile incident	(Autonomous Republic of Crimea)	Inconclusive: Ukrainians (Vereschchagino) vs Russians		Ukrainians fail to avoid missile testing area off Crimea
2000	Al-Qaeda insurgency in Yemen	12 Oct	USS Cole bombing	(Yemen)	Al-Qaeda	Americans (Cole)	Cole is target of suicide attack while refueling in Aden harbour; seventeen American sailors are killed and 37 are injured
2000	Gaza–Israel conflict	7 Nov	Gaza suicide boat attack	(Palestine) (Israel)	Hamas	Israel	Hamas member "Hamdi ansio" carried a naval suicide operation. He boarded a boat loaded with 20 kilograms of TNT and targeted an Israeli naval boat, Hamas claimed the operation was a success while Israel denied
2001	Japan–North Korea relations	22 Dec	Battle of Amami-Ōshima	(Japan)	Japanese	North Koreans	Japanese coast guard vessels sink an armed North Korean spy trawler
2002	Korean Conflict	29 June	Second Battle of Yeonpyeong	(North Korea) / (South Korea)	Indecisive: North Koreans vs South Koreans		A South Korean naval patrol encounters North Korean intruders and forces them to withdraw
2003	2003 invasion of Iraq	20-24 March	Battle of Al Faw	(Iraq)	Coalition	Iraqis	Amphibious operation on the Al-Faw Peninsula; Coalition captures Iraqi ports and oil platforms
2004	2003 invasion of Iraq	24 April	Attack on USS Firebolt	(Iraq)	Coalition (Firebolt and Stuart) vs Iraqi suicide bombers		Firebolt is attacked by suicide dhows while defending Iraqi oil platforms in the Persian Gulf, destroying its RHIB. Three of her crew are killed. Two more suicide dhows are sunk by Stuart.
2006	Piracy in Somalia	18 March	Action of 18 March	(Somalia)	Americans	Somali pirates	Pirates attack two American naval vessels
2006	Sri Lankan civil war	11 May	Battle of Point Pedro	(Sri Lanka)	Sri Lanka Navy	LTTE Sea Tigers	18 SLN personnel and around 50 Tigers dead
2006	2006 Lebanon War	14 July	Attack on INS Hanit	(Lebanon)	Hezbollah	Israelis (Hanit)	Hanit is struck by a land-launched C-802 anti-ship missile off the coast of Beirut and is damaged
2007	Sri Lankan civil war	19 June	Battle of Point Pedro	(Sri Lanka)	Sri Lanka Navy	LTTE Sea Tigers	
2007	Piracy in Somalia	28 Oct	Action of 28 October	(Yemen)	Americans	Somali pirates	
2008	Russo-Georgian War	9 Aug	Battle off the coast of Abkhazia	(Abkhazia)	Russians (Black Sea Fleet)	Georgian Navy	Georgian ship sunk
2009	Piracy in Somalia	3 March	Action of 3 March	(Yemen)	Germans and Americans (Rheinland-Pfalz)	Somali pirates	Pirate skiff is captured
2009	Piracy in Somalia	8-12 April	Maersk Alabama hijacking		Americans (MV Tygra)	Somali pirates	
2009	Piracy in Somalia	7 Sep	Action of 7 September	(Yemen)	Germans	Somali pirates	
2009	Korean Conflict	10 Nov	Battle of Daecheong	(South Korea)	Inconclusive: North Koreans vs South Koreans		South Koreans damage North Korean gunboat and force it to withdraw
2010	Korean Conflict	26 March	ROKS Cheonan sinking	(South Korea)	North Koreans	South Koreans (Cheonan)	Cheonan is torpedoed and sunk by a North Korean Yono-class submarine
2010	Gaza–Israel conflict	31 May	2010 Gaza flotilla raid	(Palestine) (Israel)	Israel	2010 Gaza Freedom Flotilla	Six civilian ships of the Gaza Freedom Flotilla were raided by Israel on 31 May 2010 in international waters in the Mediterranean Sea. Ten of the flotilla passengers were killed, with 29 wounded, Ten Israeli soldiers were wounded, the ships were carrying humanitarian aid intending to break the Israeli naval blockade of the Gaza Strip.
2011	Piracy in Somalia	18-21 Jan	Operation Dawn of Gulf of Aden	(Somalia)	Republic of Korea Navy Supported by Royal Navy of Oman and United States Navy	Somali pirates	21 hostages safely rescued from the Somali pirates
2011	First Libyan Civil War	29 April	action of 29 April	(Libya)	French (Courbet)	Libyan RHIB	Courbet engages four Libyan RHIB mineplanters off Misrata, sinking one
2011	Mexican drug war	8 May	Battle of Falcon Lake	(Mexico)	Ongoing: Americans and Mexicans vs Los Zetas		Attack from Americans/Mexicans leaves twelve cartels members and one marine dead
2011	First Libyan Civil War	12 May	Action of 12 may	(Libya)	Canadian, British and French	Libyans	Naval attack on the city of Misrata is repulsed by Canada, UK and France
2012	Piracy in Indonesia	18-22 Nov	MT Zafirah hijacking	(Indonesia)	Vietnamese	Indonesian pirates	
2013	terrorism in Egypt	31 Aug	attack on COSCO Asia	(Egypt)	Egypt	Al Furqan Brigades	militants attacked Panamanian-flagged container ship COSCO Asia using RPG while it was in the Suez canal, the ship suffered minor damages and the three militants involved in the attack were arrested according to Egyptian Authorities
2014	Russo-Ukrainian War	23 March	Capture of the Cherkasy	(Autonomous Republic of Crimea)	Russians under Chirkov, Vitko and Berezovsky	Ukrainians under Tenyukh, Hayduk, Fedash and Kovalenko (Cherkasy)	Cherkasy is boarded and captured by Russian forces after attempting to flee Crimea
2014	Terrorism in Egypt	12 Nov	Damietta ship hijacking	(Egypt)	Egypt	Hijackers	On November 12, assailants hijacked an Egyptian Navy guided missile craft in Damietta. Egyptian military aircraft engaged the attackers, destroying the boat and killing the hijackers
2015	Piracy in Indonesia	11-19 June	MT Orkim Harmony hijacking		Malaysians (Orkim Harmony)	Indonesian pirates	Hijack foiled
2016	2016 Niger Delta conflict	Aug-Sep	Operation Crocodile Smile	(Nigeria)	Nigeria	Niger Delta Avengers	Nigeria's army start operation crocodile smile to stop militant activities in the Niger delta.
2016	2016 Niger Delta conflict	Aug-Sep	Operation Crocodile tears	(Nigeria)	Nigeria	Niger Delta Avengers	militant groups in the Niger Delta start operation crocodile tears as a counter-action to Nigerian Army's "Operation Crocodile Smile".
2016	Yemeni civil war	1 Oct	Attack on HSV-2 Swift	(Yemen)	Houthis	United Arab Emirates (Swift)	Swift is attacked by a C-802 anti-ship missile off Yemen and is severely damaged
2017		30 Jan	Attack on HMS Al Madinah	(Yemen)	Houthis	Saudis	Saudi Al Madinah is struck by a remote-controlled suicide boat off Yemen and is severely damaged
2018	Russo-Ukrainian War	25 Nov	2018 Kerch Strait incident	(Ukraine)	Russians	Ukrainians	Skirmish at Kerch Strait
2019	Korean conflict	February	2019 SEAL Team Six operation in North Korea	(North Korea)	North Korea	SEAL Team Six	Mission aborted after being detected by a North Korean boat and the SEALs were unable to plant the listening device, at least 3 North Korean civilian fishermen killed
2020		17 May	Attack on Stolt Apol	(Yemen)	British (Stolt Apol)	Pirates	British-flagged tanker Stolt Apol is attacked by two pirate skiffs 75 nautical miles off the coast of Yemen in the Gulf of Aden and disables one skiff before escaping
2021	Petro-piracy in the Gulf of Guinea	23 Jan	Attack on the MOZART	(São Tomé and Príncipe)	Pirates	MOZART container vessel	The container vessel, MOZART, was attacked by pirates in the Gulf of Guinea, around São Tomé and Príncipe, resulting in one crew member killed and 15 crew members kidnapped.
2022	Russian invasion of Ukraine	24 Feb—20 May	Siege of Mariupol	(Ukraine)	Russians	Ukrainians	Russians sink three Ukrainian warships
2022	Russian invasion of Ukraine	24 Feb—30 June	Snake Island campaign	(Ukraine)	Ukrainians	Russians (Moskva and Vasily Bykov)	Russians fail to conquer the island
2022	Russian invasion of Ukraine	25-28 Feb	Berdiansk port attack	(Ukraine)	Ukrainians	Russians (Saratov, Tsezar Kunikov and Novocherkassk)	Russian forces capture a dozen Ukrainian warships but Saratov
2022	Russian invasion of Ukraine	3 March	Sinking of the Sloviansk	(Ukraine)	Russians	Ukrainians (Sloviansk)	Sloviansk is sunk by a Russian Kh-31 anti-ship missile and is believed to have sunk with all hands
2022	Russian invasion of Ukraine	14 April	Sinking of the Moskva	(Ukraine)	Ukrainians	Russians (Moskva)	Moskva is struck by two Ukrainian R-360 Neptune anti-ship missiles, causing a chain reaction of explosions and later the sinking of the ship
2022	Russian invasion of Ukraine	17 June	Sinking of the Spastel Vasily Bekh	(Ukraine)	Ukrainians	Russians (Spasatel Vasily Bekh)	Ukrainian Harpoon anti-ship missiles sink the Russian Navy rescue tug, Spasatel Vasily Bekh
2022	Russian invasion of Ukraine	26 Oct	Attack on the RFS Velikiy Ustyug	(Ukraine)	Russians (Velikiy Ustyug)	Ukrainians	Ukrainian naval drones attack and damage the Russian Buyan M-class corvette, Velikiy Ustyug
2022	Russian invasion of Ukraine	29 Oct	Drone attack on the Sevastopol Naval Base	(Autonomous Republic of Crimea)	Russians	Ukrainians	Ukrainian unmanned surface drones attack Sevastopol Naval Base in Crimea, damaging three Russian warships
2023	Russian invasion of Ukraine	29 May	Sinking of the Yuri Olefirenko	(Ukraine)	Russians	Ukrainians (Yuri Olefirenko)	Yuri Olefirenko is sunk by Russian anti-ship missiles while docked in Odesa; Ukraine has not confirmed nor denied the loss
2023	Russian invasion of Ukraine	11 June	Attack on the Priazovye		Russians (SSV-201 Priazovye)	Ukrainians	Russians repel Ukrainian sea drone attack on the Vishnya-class intelligence ship Priazovye
2023	Russian invasion of Ukraine	4 Aug	Attack on the Olenegorsky Gornyak	(Russia)	Ukrainians	Russians (Olenegorsky Gornyak)	Ukrainian sea drones attack and damage the Russian tank landing ship Olenegorsky Gornyak off Novorossiysk
2023	Russian invasion of Ukraine	13 Sep	First Missile Attack on Sevastopol	(Autonomous Republic of Crimea)	Ukrainians	Russians (Minsk and Rostov-na-Donu)	Ukrainian cruise missiles strike Sevastopol shipyards, damaging RFS Minsk and RFS Rostov-na-Donu
2023	Russian invasion of Ukraine	14 Sep	Attack on the Sergey Kotov	(Autonomous Republic of Crimea)	Ukrainians	Russians (Sergey Kotov)	Bykov-class patrol ship Sergey Kotov is attacked and severely damaged by Ukrainian sea drones
2023	Russian invasion of Ukraine	16 Sep	Attack on the Samum	(Autonomous Republic of Crimea)	Ukrainians	Russians (Samum)	Bora-class corvette Samum, is attacked and damaged by Ukrainian sea drones
2023	Gaza war	7 Oct	Zikim attack	(Palestine) / (Israel)	Israeli Navy	Hamas	most Hamas attack boats attempting to infiltrate Israel are intercepted and sunk, estimated 11 militants landed from a vessel that went through. Fighting took place outside Zikim, at three military bases, and on the adjacent coastline. At least 2 boats sunk by Israeli navy.
2023	Gaza war	7 Oct-3 Nov	Al-Asef attacks	(Palestine) / (Israel)	Israeli Navy	Hamas	Hamas used their locally made "Al-Asef" submarine drones in their attack on 7 October, On 31 October their Nukhba forces unit launched the UUV targeting the Israeli navy, the IDF stated that several were intercepted By late 2023, the attacks all but stopped, Hamas’ naval unit was heavily degraded
2023	Russo-Ukrainian War	13 Oct	Attack on the Pavel Derzhavin		Ukrainians	Russians (Pavel Derzhavin)	Bykov-class patrol ship Pavel Derzhavin is attacked and damaged by Ukrainian sea drones
2023	Russo-Ukrainian War	4 Nov	Sinking of the Askold	(Autonomous Republic of Crimea)	Ukrainians	Russians (Askold)	Askold is damaged by Ukrainian cruise missiles while docked in Kerch
2023	Russo-Ukrainian War	26 Dec	Sinking of the Novocherkassk	(Autonomous Republic of Crimea)	Ukrainians	Russians (Novocherkassk)	Novocherkassk is damaged by Ukrainian cruise missiles while docked in Feodosia
2023	Red Sea crisis	30-31 Dec	Attacks on the MV Maersk Hangzhou	(Yemen)	Houthis	Americans (Maersk Hangzhou)	Maersk Hangzhou is attacked by Houthis; shipping is stopped in the Red Sea. Three Houthi fast attack craft were sunk by US Navy.
2024	Red Sea crisis	11 Jan	Capture of the Yunus	(Yemen)	US Navy	Houthis	a fishing boat called the Yunus carrying weapons including missile parts from Iran to the Houthis was intercepted and captured by Navy SEALs, during the raid two navy seals from USS Lewis B. Puller (ESB-3) fell off the ship into the sea and drowned. The head of the smuggling operation "a Pakistani named Muhammad Pahlawan" received a 40 years prison sentence
2024	Russo-Ukrainian War	1 Feb	Sinking of the Ivanovets	(Autonomous Republic of Crimea)	Ukrainians	Russians (Ivanovets)	Russian Tarantul-class corvette Ivanovets sunk by Ukrainian sea drones off Crimea
2024	Russo-Ukrainian War	14 Feb	Sinking of the Tsezar Kunikov	(Autonomous Republic of Crimea)	Ukrainians	Russians (Tsezar Kunikov)	Russian Ropucha-class landing ship Tsezar Kunikov sunk by Ukrainian sea drones off Crimea
2024	Red Sea crisis	15 July	Attack on the Bentley-I	(Yemen)	Crew of Bentley-I	Houthis	In the Red Sea, the Panamaninan-flagged tanker Bentley-I is unsuccessfully attacked by a Houthi sea drone before engaging in a gun battle with two Houthi manned fast attack craft, which are driven off
2024	Russo-Ukrainian War	2 Aug	Sinking of the Rostov-na-Donu		Ukrainians	Russians (Rustov-na-Donu)	Ukrainian drone and missile strikes on Sevastopol sink the Russian Kilo-class submarine Rostov-na-Donu, which was being repaired
2024	Red Sea crisis	21 Aug	Attacks on the Sounion	(Yemen)	Houthis	Greeks (Sounion)	In Red Sea, the Greek-flagged tanker Sounion was attacked and exchanged gunfire with two Houthi manned fast attack craft; Sounion was then hit by three projectiles and set afire before being abandoned by her crew
2024	2024 Israeli invasion of Syria	10 Dec	Attack on Latakia	(Syria)	Israel	Syria	Israeli Navy attacks and sinks 15 Syrian warships at anchor to prevent them from falling into Hay'at Tahrir al-Sham hands, including at least six Osa-class missile boat.
2025	Red Sea crisis	15 March – 6 May	Operation Rough Rider	(Yemen)	Houthis	United States Navy	US withdrawal, Houthis suffer casualties and material damage, Ceasefire leads to Houthis no longer targeting U.S. ships while continuing to strike Israeli targets and commercial shipping.
2025	Gaza war	2 May	May 2025 drone attack on Gaza Freedom Flotilla	(Malta)	Israel (allegedly)	Freedom Flotilla Coalition	Disruption of the flotilla mission to break the Blockade of the Gaza Strip, the Armed Forces of Malta sent a patrol boat to extinguish the fire
2025	Russo-Ukrainian War	28 August	Sinking of the Simferopol	(Ukraine)	Russians	Ukrainians (Simferopol)	Russian navy drone sunk Ukrainian reconnaissance ship Simferopol in the delta of the Danube River
2025	War on drugs	2 Sep - present	2025 United States strikes on Venezuelan boats	(Venezuela)	US navy	Tren de Aragua (allegedly)	Many Boats attacked, at least 100 crew members killed
2025	Gaza war	8 Sep - 24 Sep	September 2025 drone attack on Gaza Sumud Flotilla	(Tunisia)	Israel (allegedly)	Freedom Flotilla Coalition	11 ships hit with incendiary devices dropped by drones launched from a submarine citing two American intelligence officials, Italy and Spain dispatch naval vessels Virginia Fasan, Alpino and Furor to protect the flotilla but only in international waters.
2025	Russo-Ukrainian War	15 December	Novorossiysk drone attack	(Russia)	Ukraine	Russia	Ukrainian sea drones severely damage the Russian Kilo-class submarine, RFS Kolpino.
2026	2026 Iran War	28 February-8 April	Attacks on Bandar Abbas & Konarak	(Iran)	United States	Iran	US naval air and missile strikes have sunk 155 Iranian warships
2026	2026 Iran War	28 February - present	2026 Strait of Hormuz crisis	(Iran) / (Cooperation Council for the Arab States of the Gulf)	Iran	United states & Gulf Cooperation Council	Iran issued warnings prohibiting vessel passage through the Strait of Hormuz, 1 tug sunk, at least 11 merchant ships damaged.
2026	2026 Iran War	4 March	Sinking of IRIS Dena	(Sri Lanka)	United States	Iran	USS Charlotte sinks IRIS Dena, Indian Ocean, near Sri Lanka
2026	2026 Iran War	22 March	Strike on Bandar Anzali	(Iran)	Israel	Iran	Israeli Air-Force strikes Iran's Northern Fleet base at Bandar Anzali and sinks several Iranian warships, including the flagship frigate IRIS Deylaman
2026	Russo-Ukrainian War	6 April	Novorossiysk Drone Attack	(Russia)	Ukraine	Russia	Ukrainian drones strike the Black Sea Fleet in port in Novorossiysk, damaging the Russian frigates RFS Admiral Essen & RFS Admiral Makarov.
2026	Russo-Ukrainian War	19 April	Sevastopol Bay Drone Attack	(Russia) / (Ukraine)	Ukraine	Russia	Ukrainian sea drones damage three Russian warships, RFS Yamal, RFS Nikolai Filchenkov, & RFS Ivan Khurs
2026	2026 Iran War	29 July	2026 Damietta drone strike	(Egypt)	Iran "denied / accused by the US"	United States gas-storage tanker	a drone strike caused explosions at two ships, including a U.S.-owned and operated Marshall Islands-flagged liquefied natural gas storage tanker.
2026	Russo-Ukrainian War	12 August	Novorossiysk Drone Attack	(Russia)	Ukraine	Russia	Ukrainian sea and air drones attack Novorossiysk Naval Base and damaged frigates RFS Admiral Makarov, RFS Admiral Essen, a Buyan M-class corvette, the patrol ship RFS Vasily Bykov, and a Kilo-class submarine.
2026	Houthi–Saudi conflict	10 September - Present	Bab al-Mandab Strait crisis	(Yemen)	Houthis	Saudi Arabia & PLC	Houthis take over the port of Mokha and the Hanish Islands and declare a blockade targeting Saudi Arabian shipping .
2026	Russo-Ukrainian war	21 November	Attack on the Sparta II	(Finland)	Ukraine	Russia	Ukrainian sea drones attack and damaged the Russian cargo ship Sparta II in the Gulf of Finland. Crew was rescued by Finnish, Estonian, & Russian rescue ships.
2026	Russo-Ukrainian war	22 November	Benghazi Drone Attack	(Libya)	Ukraine	Russia	Ukrainian sea drones attack and sink the RFS Merkury while in port in Benghazi, Libya.

== See also ==
- List of single-ship actions
- List of ships captured in the 19th century
- List of ships captured in the 18th century
- Maritime timeline
- Naval warfare
