= Battle off Lizard Point =

1637 naval battle of the Eighty Years' War off the coast of England

Coordinates: 49°49′17″N 05°12′50″W

- Part of the Eighty Years' War
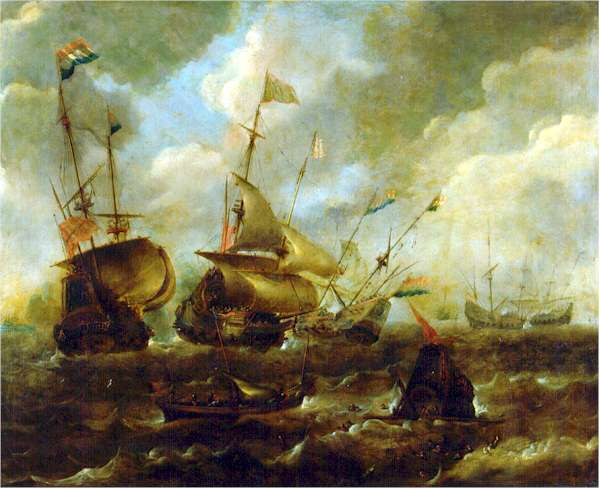
- Battle between Dutch and Spanish men-of-war. Oil on copper, Naval Museum of Madrid.
Date	18 February 1637
Location	Off Lizard Point, Cornwall
Result	Spanish victory

Belligerents
Dutch Republic	Spanish Empire

Commanders and leaders
	Miguel de Horna

Strength
6 men-of-war 44 merchant ships	6 galleons 2 frigates

Casualties and losses
3 warships sunk 3 warships captured 14 merchant ships captured	No ships lost

The Battle off Lizard Point was a naval action which took place on 18 February 1637 off the coast of Cornwall, England, during the Eighty Years' War. Spanish admiral Miguel de Horna, commander of the Armada of Flanders, intercepted an important Anglo-Dutch merchant convoy of 44 vessels escorted by six Dutch States Navy warships, sinking or capturing 20 ships before returning safely to his base in Dunkirk.

== Background ==
In early 1636, the experienced Flemish admiral, Jacob Collaert, commander of the Armada of Flanders, the fleet of the Dunkirkers, was defeated by five warships of the Dutch blocking fleet under Captain Johan Evertsen. His galleon and another vessel were sunk after a prolonged engagement off the French coast, near Dieppe, and he was captured along with 200 of his men. After an exchange of prisoners he was freed, but died of an illness at A Coruña shortly after. The Navarrese Miguel de Horna replaced him. Horna also proved to be a skillful commander, as he destroyed three major enemy convoys in less than two years, winning the actions of the Lizard, Mardyck, and the Channel.

== Battle ==
Miguel de Horna sailed from Dunkirk on 18 February, in command of a squadron of five ships and two frigates, to attack the Dutch fishing fleet and trade routes. His captains were the Basque Antonio de Anciondo, the Flemish Marcus van Oben and Cornelis Meyne, and the Castilians Antonio Díaz and Salvador Rodríguez. After capturing a merchant ship while under fire from the coastal batteries of Calais, the Spanish squadron crossed the English Channel. An Anglo-Dutch convoy of 28 Dutch merchantmen and 16 English merchantmen, escorted by six Dutch warships, was sighted off Lizard Point, on the coast of Cornwall. The Spanish warships rapidly proceeded to attack, approaching the convoy under heavy fire from the escorting warships.

Soon after the convoy escort was engaged by the Spanish, the Dutch flagship was completely disabled by heavy cannon and musketry fire from Horna's flagship. Antonio Díaz's ship managed to board her and capture her flag, but the assault was ultimately repulsed. A second attempt from Horna's ship, which lasted half an hour, also failed, but with the help of a third Spanish ship under Cornelis Meyne, the Dutch flagship was finally captured. Although the merchants used their cannon to help the Dutch warships, three were nevertheless sunk. The remaining two surrendered and were captured. The convoy ships dispersed and tried to escape individually, taking advantage of the smoke of battle and the darkness of the night. However, 14 of them fell into Spanish hands and were taken to Dunkirk with the three captured warships.

== Aftermath ==
Horna returned to Dunkirk escorting 17 prizes fully loaded with ammunitions and supplies. He avoided the Dutch lieutenant-admiral, Philips van Dorp, who had been sent to intercept with 20 warships. Dorp attempted to blockade the Spanish fleet in the port, but Horna was able to continue his campaigns without difficulties. In July, he ambushed two Dutch Bordeaux convoys, carrying off 12 prizes loaded with, amongst other items, 125 valuable cavalry horses. The convoy coming from Venice to Amsterdam was also captured, as well as 14 ships of the Dutch East India Company and eight which carried gifts to Louis XIII.

In a later exploit, the action of 18 February 1639, when he was attacked by a Dutch fleet of 17 ships, Horna managed to help a Spanish convoy escape, despite his numerical inferiority.
