= Action of 18 February 1639 =

1639 naval battle of the Eighty Years' War

- Part of the Eighty Years' War
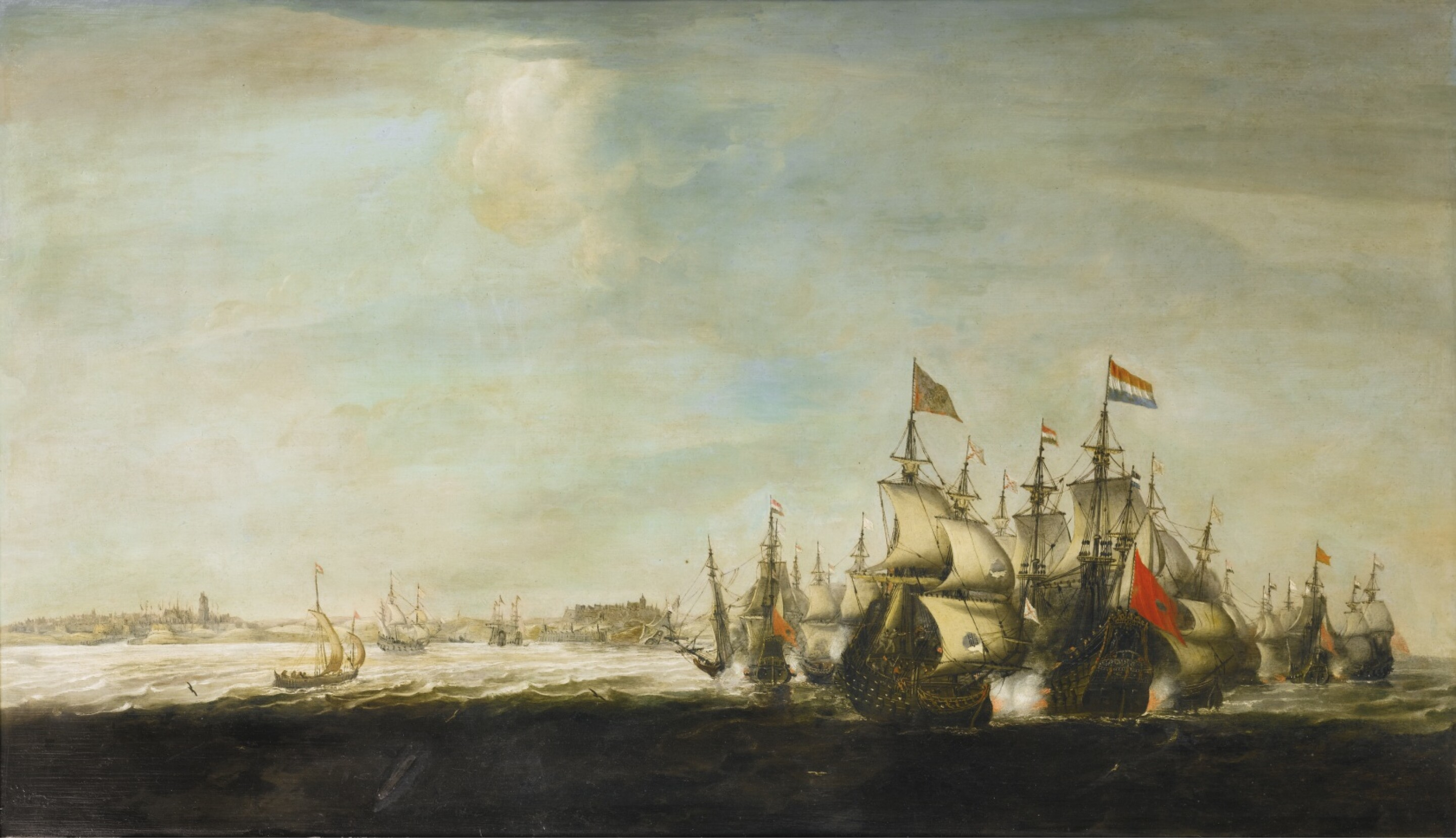
- The naval battle against the Spaniards near Dunkerque, 18 february 1639, by Jan Abrahamsz Beerstraaten.
Date	18 February 1639
Location	Off Dunkirk, (present-day France) 51.104°N 2.394°E
Result	Dutch victory

Belligerents
Dutch Republic	(Spain) Spanish Empire

Commanders and leaders
(Dutch Republic) Maarten Tromp	(Spain) Miguel de Horna

Strength
12 warships	12 galleons 3 pinnaces 5 transports

Casualties and losses
No ships lost 1,700 captured, killed, or wounded ?	3 ships lost min. 600 killed and wounded 1,600 men killed or wounded, 250 captured

The action of 18 February 1639 was a naval battle of the Eighty Years' War fought off Dunkirk between a Dutch fleet under the command of Admiral Maarten Tromp and the Spanish Dunkirk Squadron under Miguel de Horna. Horna, who had orders to join with his ships Admiral Antonio de Oquendo's fleet at A Coruña, escorted at the same time a transport convoy carrying 2,000 Walloon soldiers to Spain, where they were needed. The attempt to exit Dunkirk was done in sight of the Dutch blockading squadron of Maarten Tromp. A 4-hour battle ensued and Horna was forced to retreat into Dunkirk leaving behind two of his galleons, whilst another ran aground. Despite his success in stopping the sortie, many of Tromp's ships suffered heavy damage, and the Dutch Admiral was forced to abandon the blockade. Therefore, De Horna, after repairing his squadron, was able to accomplish his mission.

== Background ==
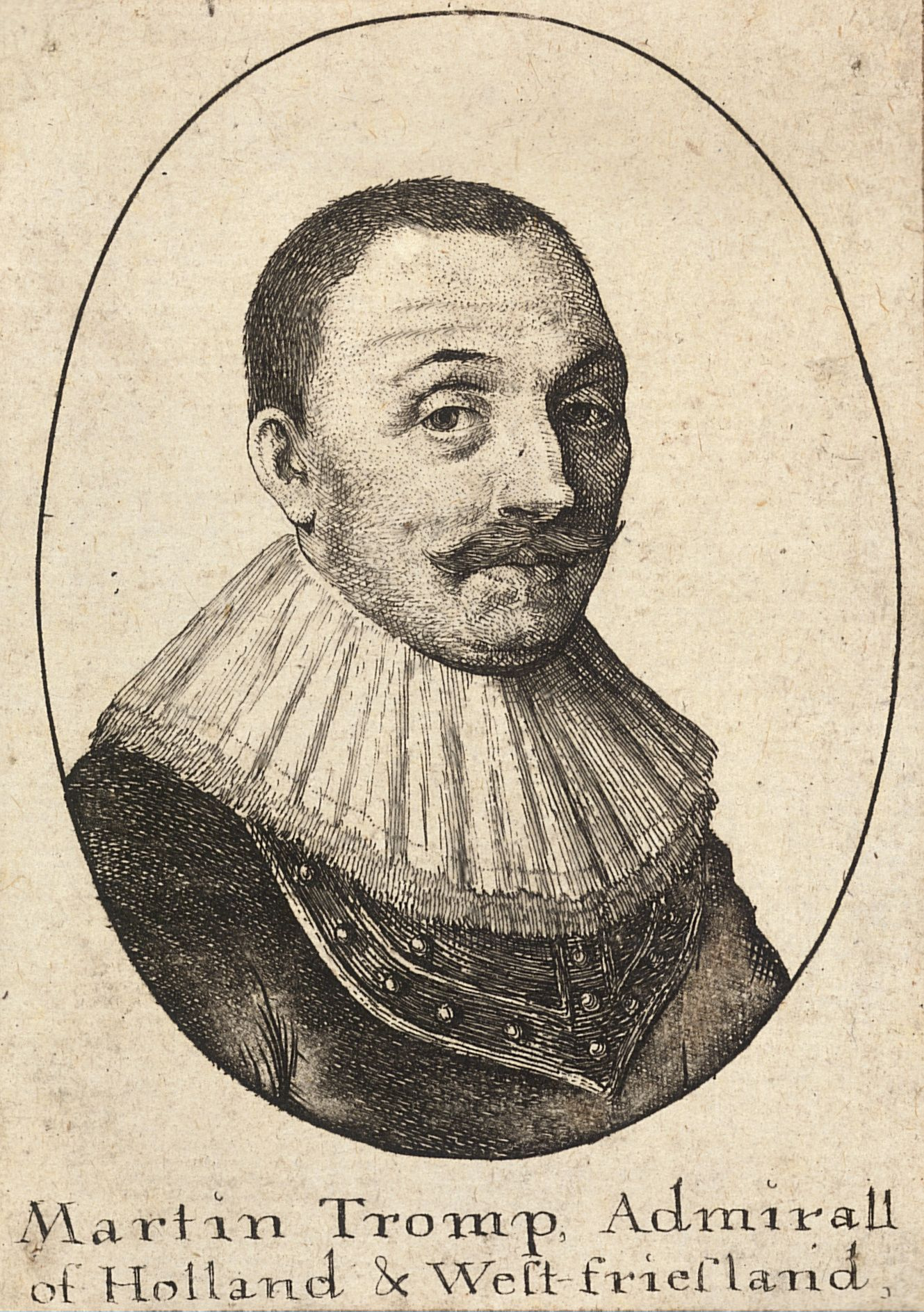
Maarten Tromp after an engraving by Wenzel Hollar.

By 1639 the Spanish naval situation in the war against the Dutch Republic had worsened. Most of the Armada del Mar Océano had been attached to the Armada de Pernambuco under don Fernando de Mascarenhas, and the Treasure fleets were blocked by Cornelis Jol's privateer ships of the Dutch West India Company at Havana and Veracruz. The French entrance in the war had cost Spain its northern fleet, destroyed by a larger French fleet under Henri d'Escoubleau de Sourdis at the Battle of Guetaria, where the Basque shipyards were disabled. Only 20 galleons commanded by Antonio de Oquendo were still on the warpath.

In January 1639 the Count-Duke of Olivares ordered a great fleet to be gathered at the Galician port of A Coruña with the aim of carrying troops and money to the Spanish Netherlands. Admiral Antonio de Oquendo was given the command of this fleet. As the French and Dutch armies had blocked the Spanish Road, Spain's main route by land, the reinforcements could only be sent by sea. Following the orders of Olivares, the Spanish Squadron of Dunkirk, under the Navarrese Admiral Miguel de Horna, prepared to join Oquendo at A Coruña. The recently recruited Walloon Tercio of the Baron of Molinguen, whose strength was about 2,000 men, was embarked aboard the Dunkirk Squadron in order to be transported to Spain to face an imminent French attack in the north of the country.

Once the States-General received news of these activities, Admiral Maarten Tromp was ordered to prevent the departure of the Dunkirkers in command of 12 warships, appearing off Dunkirk on 17 February. The Marquis of Fuentes, military governor of the town, categorically ordered Miguel de Horna to sail without delay, not fearing the Dutch squadron because of its smaller strength. The Spanish convoy, consisting of 12 galleons, 3 pinnaces, and 5 transports, departed the port at dawn on 18 February via a southern outlet called Het Scheurtje (The Little Fissure). According to contemporary Spanish accounts, a large number of Horna's ships ran aground at Mardyck, and the Admiral found himself alone with only 6 galleons and 2 frigates.

== Battle ==
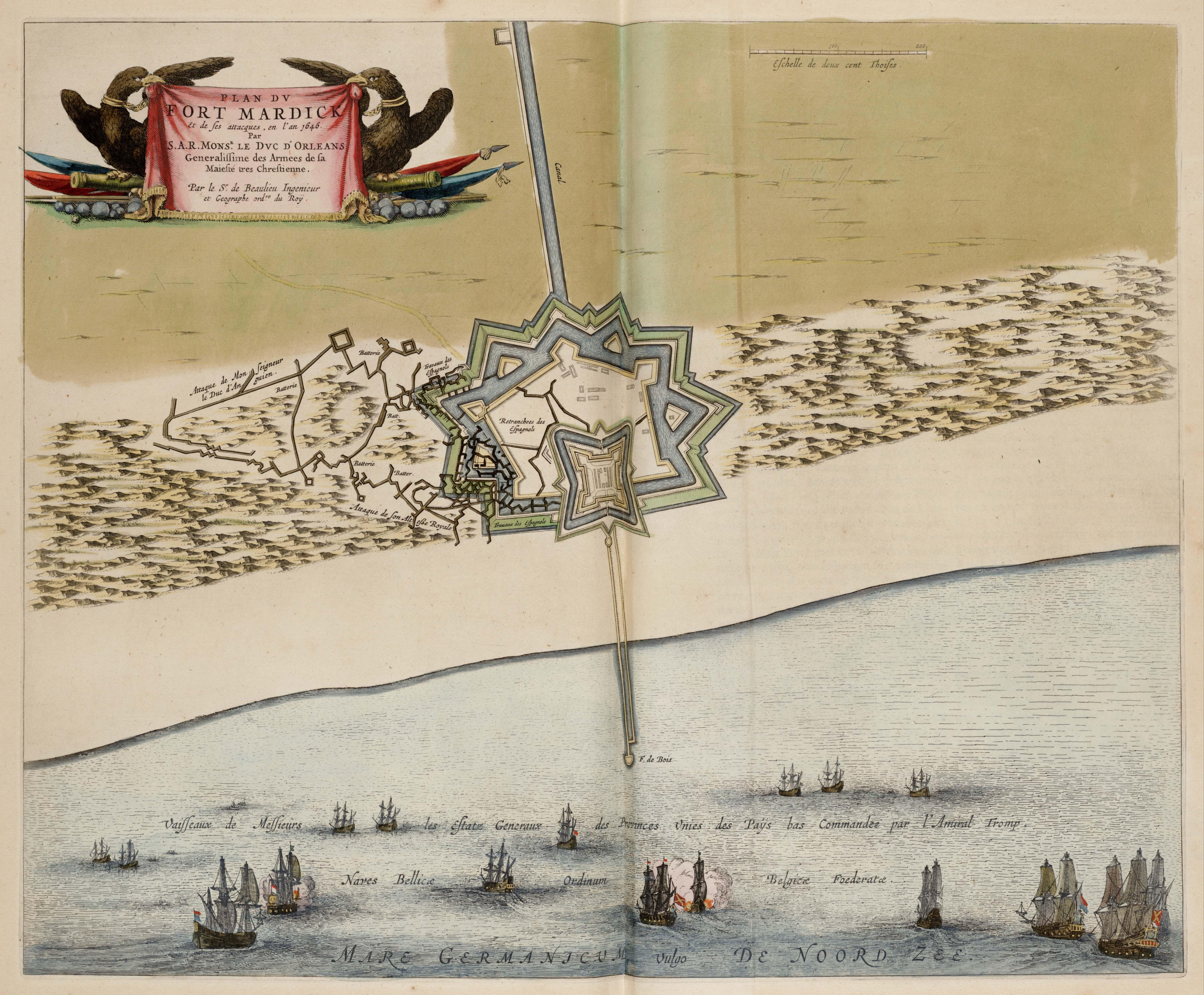
Map of Fort-Mardyck in 1646, by Joan Blaeu.

At the same time that the Spanish squadron sailed out the Splinter off Mardyck at 8 PM with very little wind, Tromp's 12 vessels were anchored in the Dunkirk Roads. They set sail and ran westwards between the brakes and the Splinter, intercepting the Spanish squadron between Mardyck and Gravelines. As soon as both fleets came within firing range of each other, a furious battle began that lasted 4 hours. Tromp's flagship Amelia was damaged and the Dutch Admiral was forced twice to careen and plug its leaks.

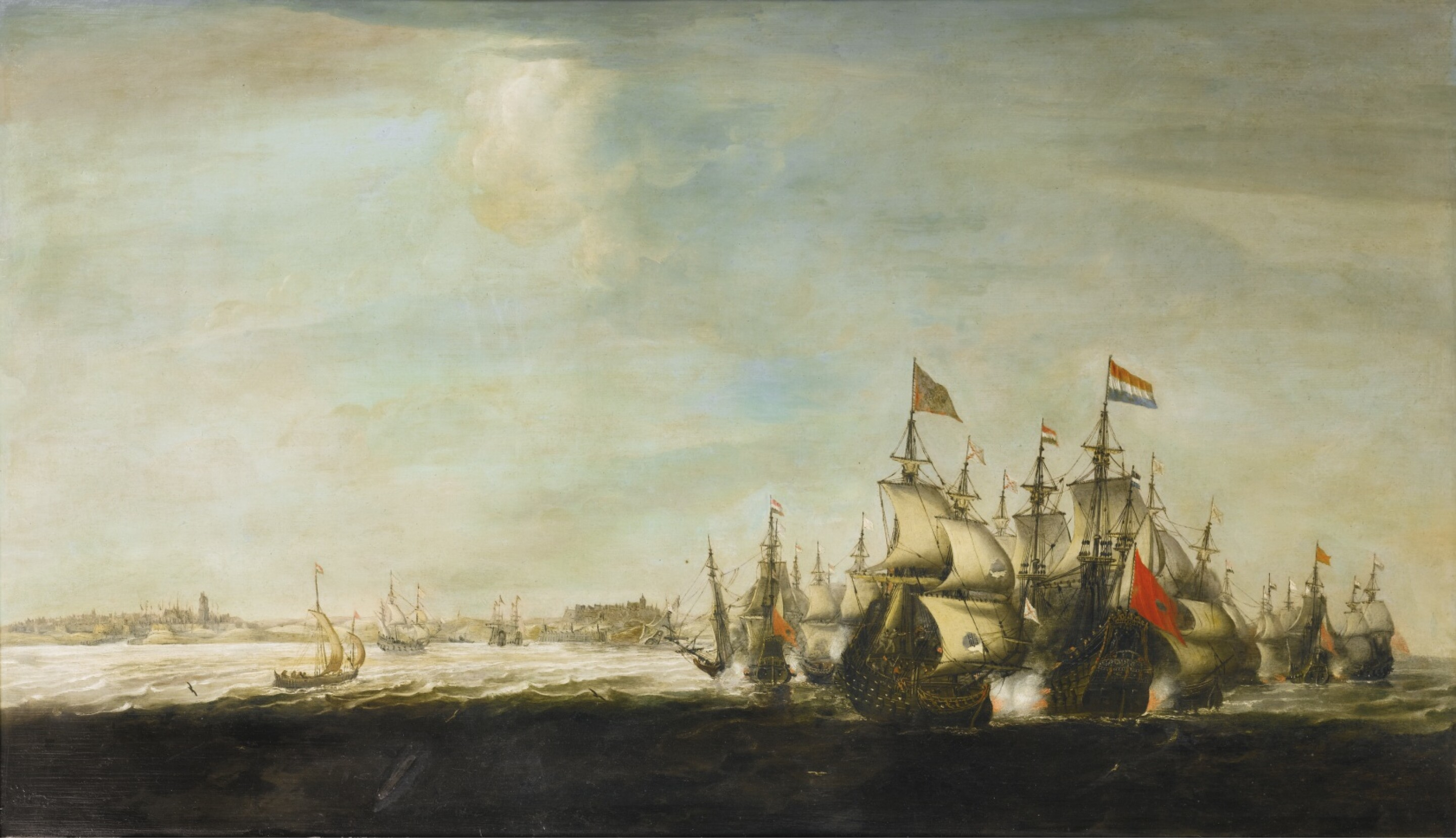
The Battle of Dunkirk (18 February 1639), circle of Jan Abrahamsz Beerstraaten

As none of the winds was shifting westerly his vessels, Horna bore down towards the Fort of Mardyck in a smooth water searching the protection of its guns. Tromp followed him and engaged the vice-flagship of Dunkirk, which had lost the use of its steerage and had its rudder-head shot, being finally run aground upon the western tail of the Splinter, where its crew set it on fire after salvaging some of the provisions that it had aboard. The galleons under Captains Mény and Petit, of 34 guns each, were captured, and De Horna was forced to retire. The casualties suffered by his fleet were estimated by the Dutch to be 1,600 men killed or wounded, and reported as 400 from all causes in the Spanish accounts. About 250 prisoners were taken aboard the two captured galleons.

== Aftermath ==
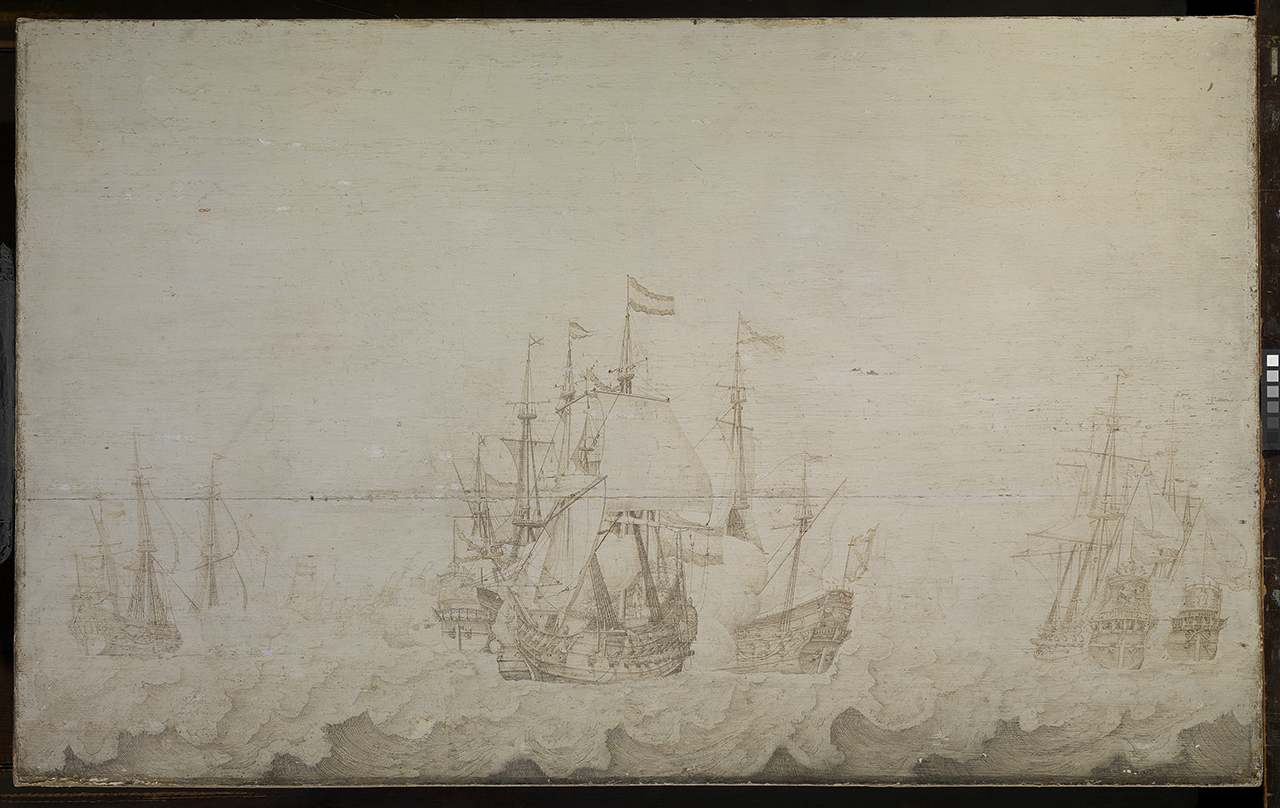
The first battle of Dunkirk, 1 March 1639, painting by Heerman Witmont

The Marquis of Fuentes was blamed for the failure but imprisoned De Horna and his Vice-Admiral Matthys Rombout after the action, although he soon restored them to their posts. In less than a month the squadron was repaired, re-equipped, re-manned, and put to the sea again, and Horna set sail from Dunkirk on 12 March. The port was then no longer blockaded and the squadron reached A Coruña safely having captured some commercial vessels. Tromp, meanwhile, had been honored, as well as his captains, with gold chains and medals and fair words. Unlike the Spanish, however, he could not repair his ships, and when he set sail on 15 March, too late to stop De Horna, he did it only in command of 4 ships. De Horna, strategically if not tactically, had accomplished his mission, while Tromp's 2-year blockade of Dunkirk had failed to prevent the Spanish ships from continuing to undertake their activities. De Horna added seven galleons to Oquendo's fleet: San José, San Vicente, San Gedeón, Salvador, San Juan Evangelista, San Martín, and San Carlos.
