= Line of battle =

Naval warfare tactic in which a fleet of ships forms a line end to end

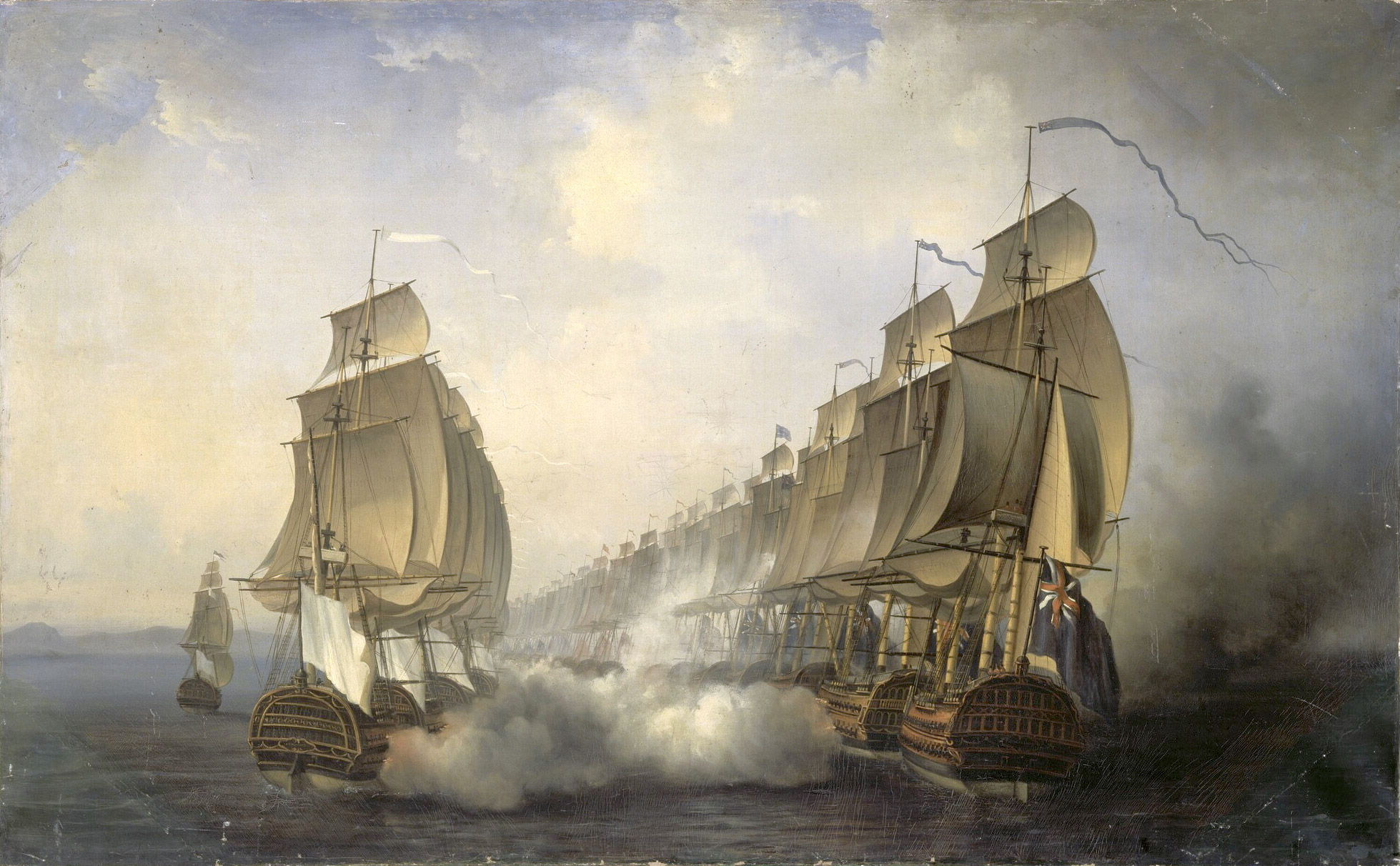
French (left) and British (right) warships in lines of battle at the 1783 Battle of Cuddalore

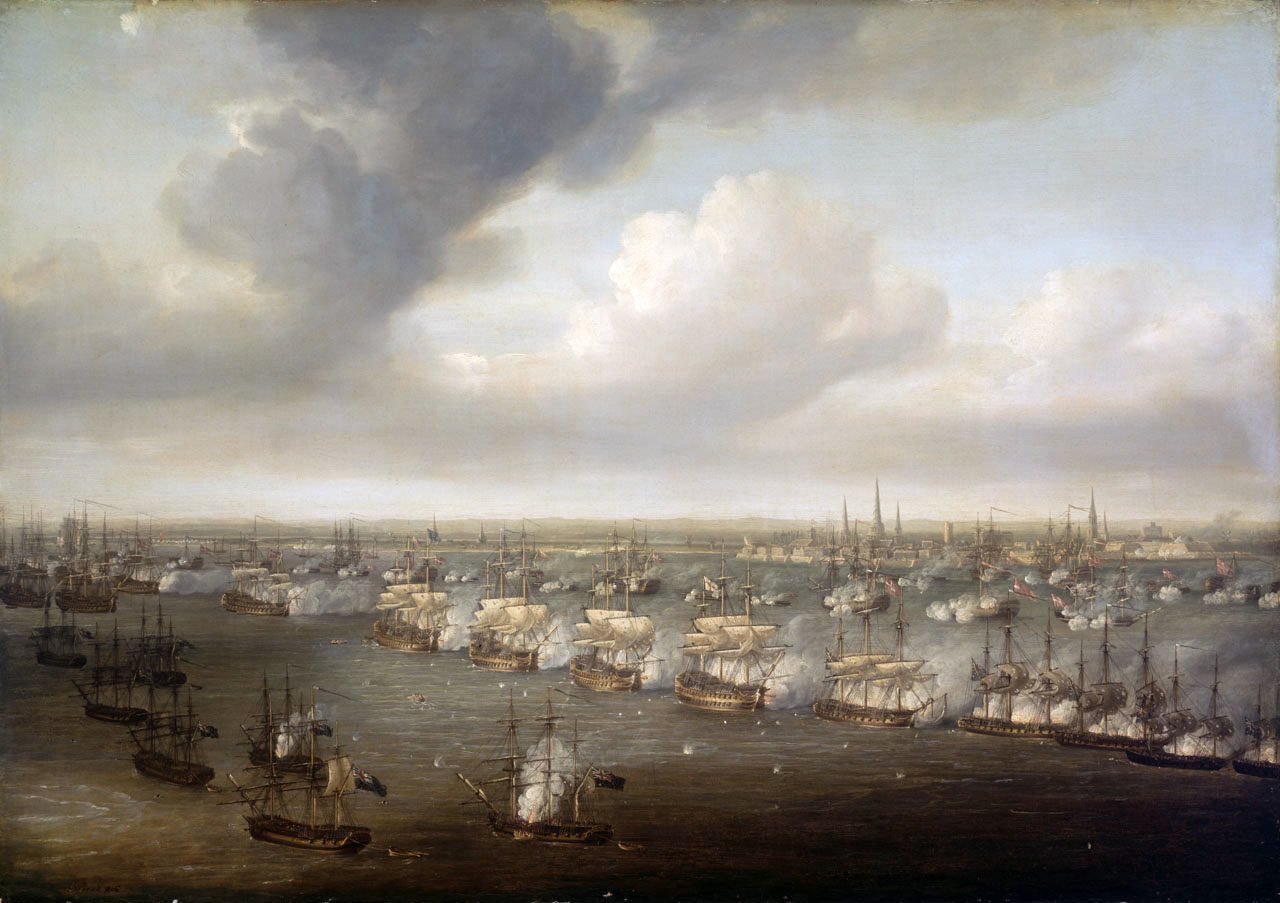
British (foreground) and Danish (background) warships in lines of battle at the 1801 Battle of Copenhagen

The line of battle or the battle line is a tactic in naval warfare in which a fleet of ships (known as ships of the line) forms a line end to end. The first example of its use as a tactic is disputed—it has been variously claimed for dates ranging from 1502 to 1652. Line-of-battle tactics were in widespread use by 1675.

Compared with prior naval tactics, in which two opposing ships closed on one another for individual combat, the line of battle has the advantage that each ship in the line can fire its broadside without fear of hitting a friendly ship. This means that in a given period, the fleet can fire more shots. Another advantage is that a relative movement of the line in relation to some part of the enemy fleet allows for a systematic concentration of fire on that part. The other fleet can avoid this by manoeuvring in a line itself, with a result typical for sea battles since 1675: two fleets sail alongside one another (or on the opposite tack).

== Background ==
The first recorded mention of the use of a line of battle tactic is to be found in the Instructions, provided in 1500 by Manuel I, king of Portugal, to the commander of a fleet dispatched to the Indian Ocean. The precision in the Instructions suggests that the tactic was in place before this date. Portuguese fleets overseas deployed in line ahead, firing one broadside and then putting about in order to return and discharge the other, resolving battles by gunnery alone. In a treatise of 1555, The Art of War at Sea, Portuguese theorist on naval warfare and shipbuilding, Fernão de Oliveira, recognized that at sea, the Portuguese "fight at a distance, as if from walls and fortresses...". He recommended the single line ahead as the ideal combat formation.

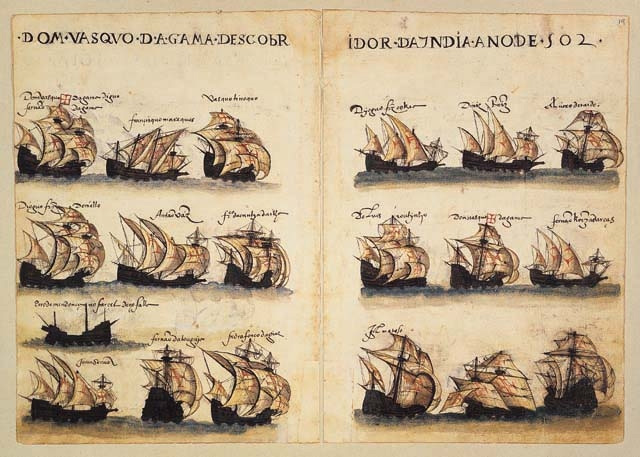
The Fourth Portuguese India Armada of 1502, from the Livro de Lisuarte de Abreu)

Line-of-battle tactics had been used by the Fourth Portuguese India Armada at the Battle of Calicut (1503), under Vasco da Gama, near Malabar against a Muslim fleet. One of the earliest recorded deliberate uses is documented in the First Battle of Cannanore between the Third Portuguese India Armada under João da Nova and the naval forces of Calicut, earlier in the same year. Others place the first line of battle in the Battle of Cochin. Another early, but different form of this strategy, was used in 1507 by Afonso de Albuquerque at the entrance to the Persian Gulf, in the first conquest of Ormuz. Albuquerque commanded a fleet of six carracks manned by 460 men, and entered Ormuz Bay, being surrounded by 250 warships and a 20,000 men army on land. Albuquerque made his small fleet (but powerful in its artillery) circle like a carrousel, but in a line end-to-end, and destroyed most of the ships that surrounded his squadron. He then captured Ormuz.

From the mid-16th century, the cannon gradually became the most important weapon in naval warfare, replacing boarding actions as the decisive factor in combat. At the same time, the natural tendency in the design of galleons was for longer ships with lower forecastles and aftercastles, which meant faster, more stable vessels. These newer warships could mount more cannons along the sides of their decks, concentrating their firepower along their broadside, while presenting a lower target to their enemy. Francisco de Ribera was theorized to have formed his fleet in line of battle during the Battle of Cape Gelidonya, where his six sailing ships repulsed 55 Ottoman galleys through superior artillery and tactics, although the sources instead implies Ribera had his ships advance in line abreast before turning to present their broadsides to the enemy.

== Development during the Anglo-Dutch battles of the early 1650s ==
Until the mid-17th century, the tactics of a fleet were often to "charge" the enemy, firing bow chaser cannon, which did not deploy the broadside to its best effect. These new vessels required new tactics, and "since ... almost all the artillery is found upon the sides of a ship of war, hence it is the beam that must necessarily and always be turned toward the enemy. On the other hand, it is necessary that the sight of the latter must never be interrupted by a friendly ship. Only one formation allows the ships of the same fleet to satisfy fully these conditions. That formation is the line ahead [column]. This line, therefore, is imposed as the only order of battle, and consequently as the basis of all fleet tactics." The Dutch admiral Maarten Tromp first used the line of battle tactic in the Fight in the Channel, although some have disputed this.

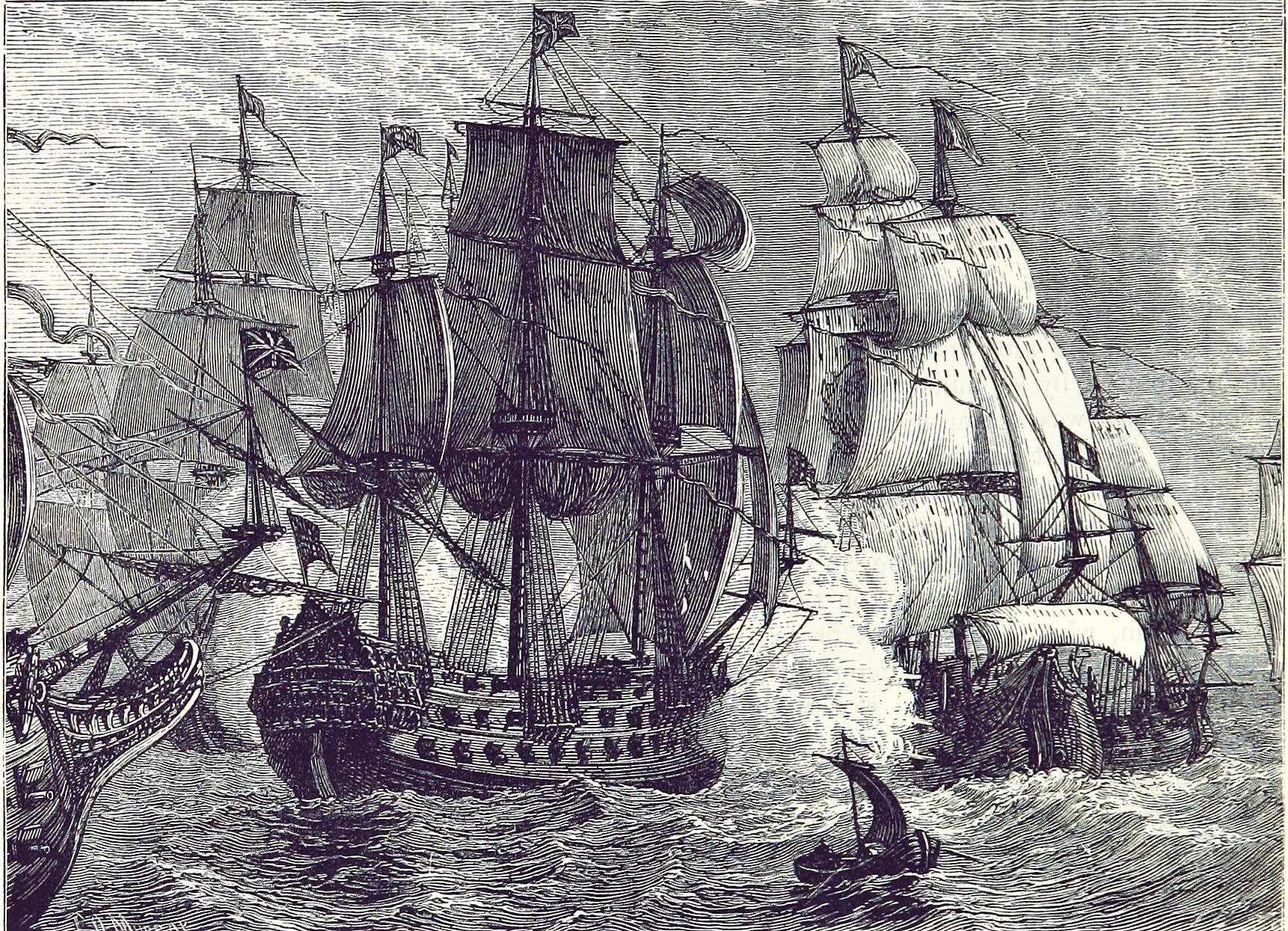
The Battle of Dover (19 May 1652), depicted in British Battles on Land and Sea (1873)

Captains on both sides of the First Anglo-Dutch War appear to have experimented with the technique in 1652, possibly including Robert Blake at the Battle of Dover (19 May 1652). Tromp faced Blake as he approached from Rye with 12 ships. After Tromp refused to strike sail in salute, a battle took place, but the Dutch, despite their superior numbers, failed to capture any English ships. The engagement was, according to the historian Ben Wilson, "a good old-fashioned melee lacking any sophisticated tactics".

The Battle of the Kentish Knock (28 September 1652) revealed the weakness of the Dutch fleet, largely consisting of smaller ships, against the English. The Dutch consequently began a large shipbuilding programme. The Battle of Dungeness (30 November 1652) was a victory for the Dutch, and led to the revitalisation of the Commonwealth Navy. One innovation introduced by George Monck (the first English professional soldier to become a senior naval officer) and Deane was the Articles of War, which introduced the concept of Red, White, and Blue squadrons, each with an admiral, a vice admiral, and a rear admiral, The Articles of War established the line of battle as a tactic for naval warfare.

After 1652, battles would be determined by the ability of a line of battle to not be broken down. The line was difficult to maintain when ships performed differently from each other and were affected by the sea conditions and the "chaos of conflict". At the Battle of Portland (18–20 February 1653), the English were scattered at the start of the battle, and so were unable to attack the Dutch fleet effectively. It was at Portland that Monck saw how little control admirals had in controlling a fleet and passing commands to his ships. One of the first precise written instructions adopting the line of battle tactic were contained in the English Navy's Fighting Instructions, written by Blake and his colleagues, and published in 1653. Instructions for the better ordering of the Fleet in Fighting, issued on 29 March 1653, was the first clear evidence of the line of battle becoming official policy.

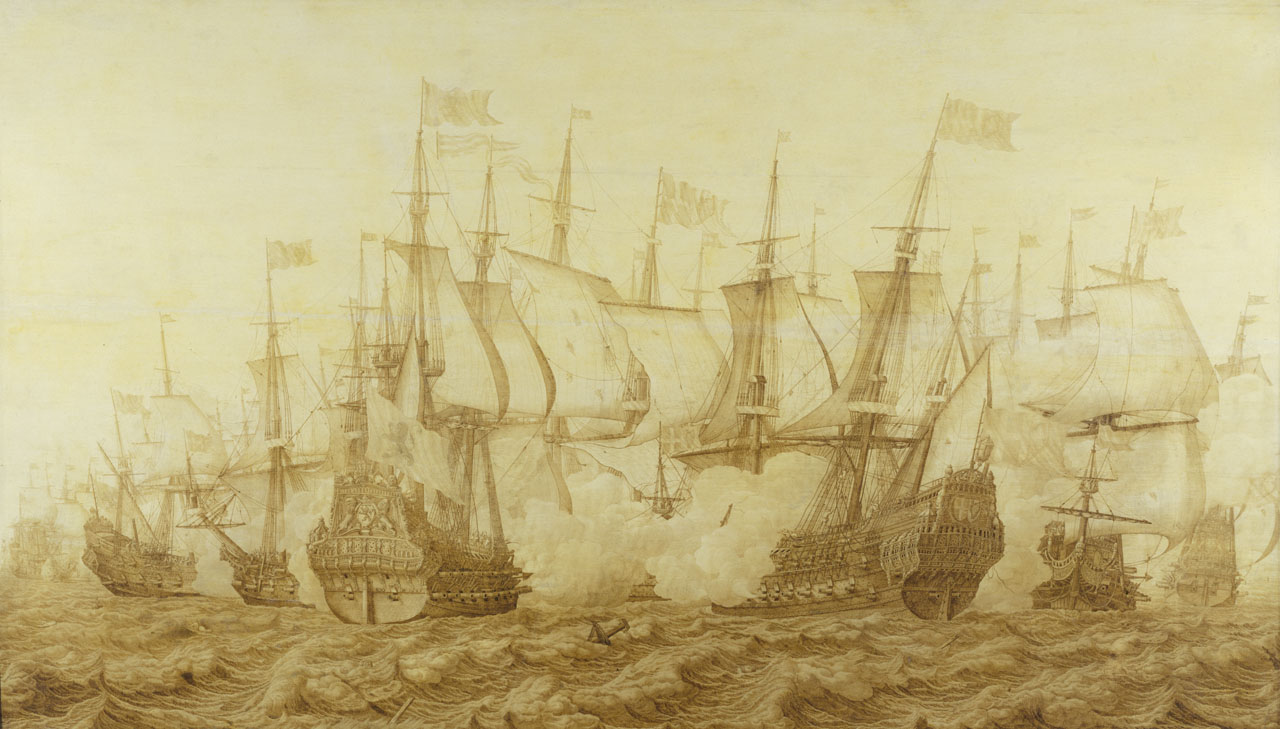
Heerman Witmont, The Battle of the Gabbard, 2 June 1653 (Royal Museums Greenwich)

During the Battle of the Gabbard (2/3 June 1653), both fleets began parallel to each other, arranged in three squadrons nose to tail. The English ships were able to fire continuous broadsides, resulting in terrible loss of life and damage to the Dutch fleet. The Dutch were unable to approach the enemy at close quarters, their preferred tactic. This usually prevailed if they could isolate and attack individual ships. The tactic revealed by the Battle of the Gabbard was not new to naval warfare, but was a consequence of the reforms imposed on the English navy. The New Fighting Instructions meant that senior officers could more easily control their ship captains, who could no longer easily evade fighting, or race heroically ahead of the rest of the fleet.

The line-of-battle tactic favoured very large ships that could sail steadily and maintain their place in the line in the face of heavy fire. The change toward the line of battle also depended on an increased disciplining of society and the demands of powerful centralized government to keep permanent fleets led by a corps of professional officers. These officers were better able to manage and communicate between the ships they commanded than the merchant crews that often comprised large parts of a navy's force. The new type of warfare that developed during the early modern period was marked by a successively stricter organization. Battle formations became standardized, based on calculated ideal models. The increased power of states at the expense of individual landowners led to increasingly larger armies and navies. A ship that was powerful enough to stand in the line of battle came to be called a ship of the line of battle, or line of battle ship. In time this became shortened to battleship.

== Problems associated with the tactic ==
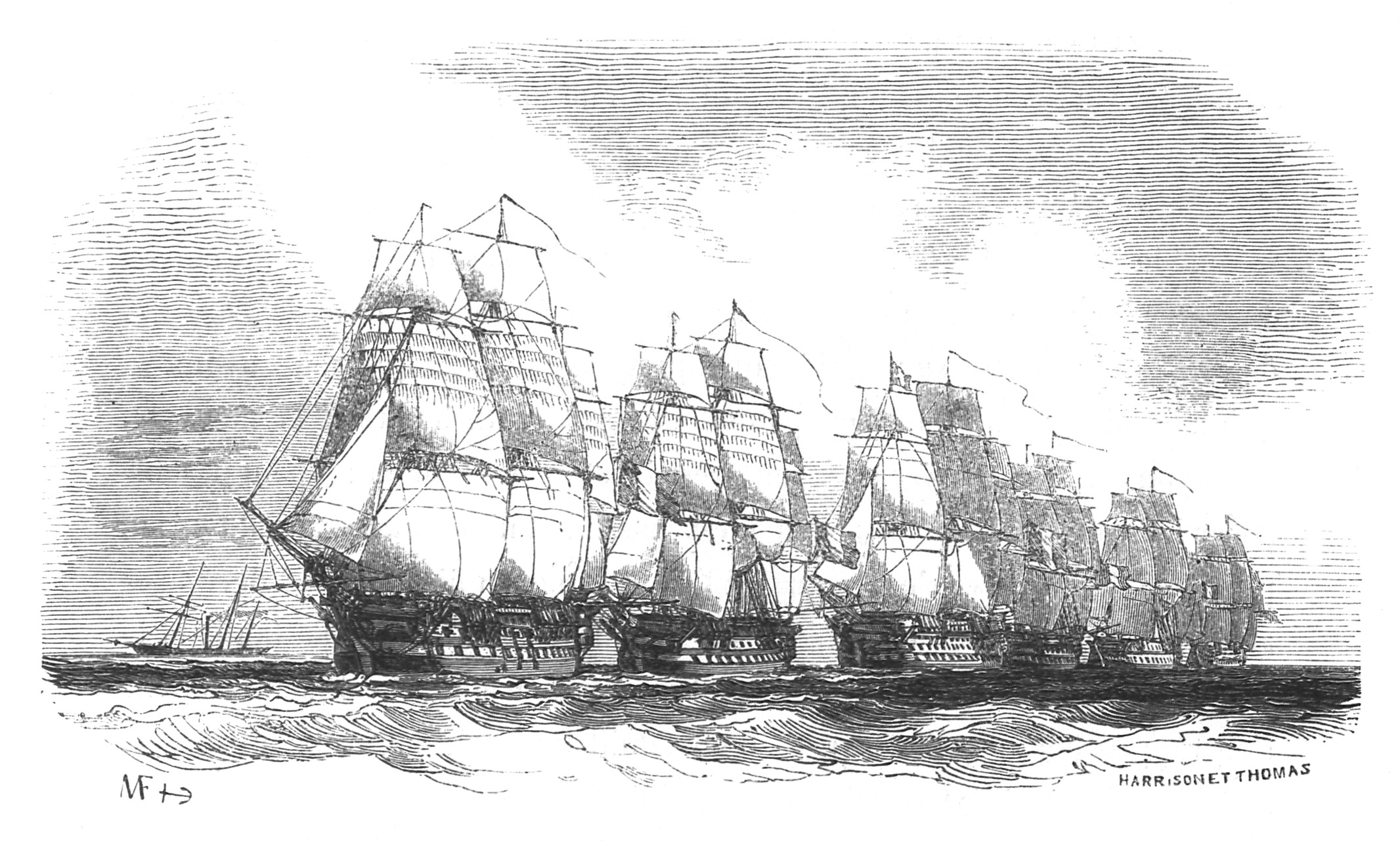
1854 illustration of a French squadron forming a line of battle

The main problem with the line of battle was that when the fleets were of similar size, naval actions using it were generally indecisive. The French in particular were adept at gunnery and would generally take the leeward position to enable their fleet to retire downwind while continuing to fire chain-shot at long range to bring down masts. Eventually so many vessels in a line would be damaged that they would be forced to retire for repairs while the French took few casualties and very little damage.

Fleet commanders sometimes met with greater success by altering or abandoning the line of battle outright by breaking the enemy line and moving through it, as occurred during the Four Days Battle, Battle of Schooneveld, and the Battle of Trafalgar. Another tactic cut off and isolated part of the enemy's line while concentrating a stronger force on it (as happened during the Battle of Texel and the Battle of the Saintes).

If the opposing fleets were of similar size, a portion of the line might be overwhelmed by focused gunfire of the entire enemy line by a tactic known as doubling. Ships broke through the enemy line and then, acting simultaneously with other vessels that remained on the original side, would engage the enemy fleet.

== Age of Steam and later developments ==
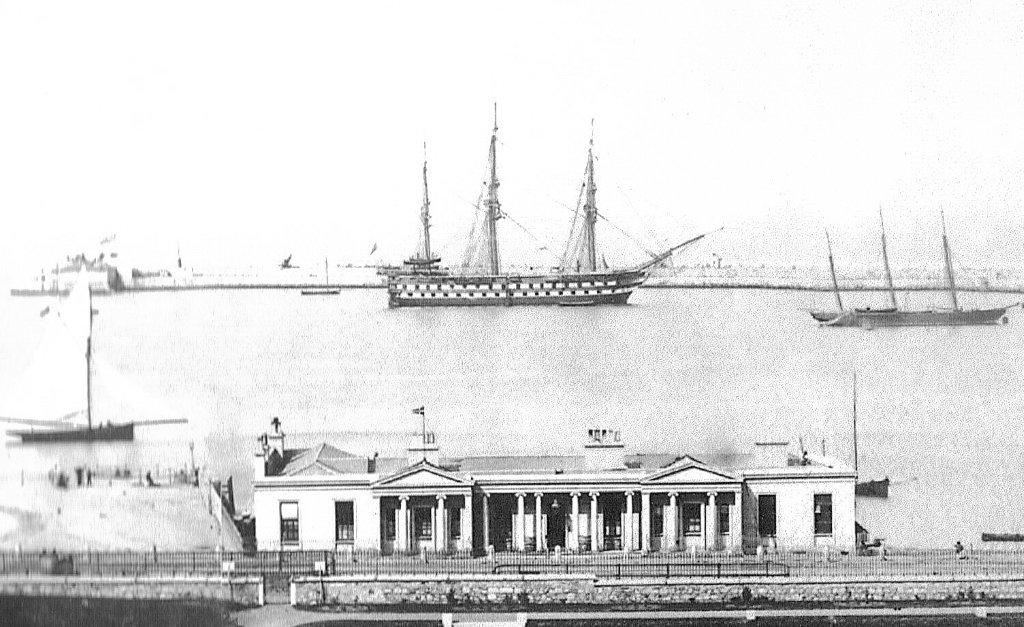
HMS Ajax, the first steam ship of the line (Maritime Institute of Ireland)

In the years following the defeat of Napoleon at the Battle of Waterloo in 1815, the British Admiralty carried out a radical reform of ship design – between 1810 and 1840, every detail was altered, and more advances occurred during this period than had happened since the 1660s. There was, however, no change in the principle of the tactic of a line of battle. These alterations were superseded by changes brought about by the advance of steam power and industrially-produced armaments.

Marine steam engines replaced wind power during the 19th century, with HMS Ajax converted to steam in 1846, becoming the first steam ship of the line. The Crimean War showed that sailing ships needed to be converted if they were to be of any military use. The introduction of the gun turret, which made it impossible to have ships with a full rig, meant that by the 1870s, sail power had been abandoned. Battleships of the line were still in use in the early 20th century, using steam-driven propellers and armed with turrets. With the introduction of ironclad warships, ramming again became a method of attack, as occurred at the Battle of Lissa (1866), the first ever fleet engagement involving ironclad ships.

When ramming fell out of fashion, the logic of the line of battle tactic returned. It was used in the Battle of Tsushima (1905), the Battle of Jutland (1916), and – for the last time – in the Battle of Surigao Strait (1944). The development of aircraft carriers as well as a wide variety of anti-ship missiles, particularly those that were cruise guided or had long range, meant that gun engagements were no longer decisive, so that there was no longer any need for a line-of-battle formation.

== See also ==
- Sailing ship tactics
- Naval tactics in the Age of Steam
- Crossing the T

== Sources ==
- Anderson, Roger Charles (1952). Naval wars in the Levant, 1559-1853. Princeton University Press. ISBN 978-1578985388.
- Archibald, E.H.H. (1971). The Metal Fighting Ship in the Royal Navy, 1860–1970. New York: Arco Pub. Co. ISBN 978-06680-2-509-6.
- Brooks, John (2016). The Battle of Jutland. Cambridge: Cambridge University Press. ISBN 978-11071-5-014-0.
- Corbett, Julian Stafford, ed. (1905). Fighting Instructions, 1530–1816. Vol. 29. The Navy Records Society. OCLC 1045333716.
- Davey, James (2018). Tudor and Stuart Seafarers: The Emergence of a Maritime Nation, 1485–1707. London: Bloomsbury Publishing. ISBN 978-14729-5-678-1.
- Glete, Jan (1993). Navies and Nations: Warships, Navies and State Building in Europe and America, 1500–1680. Vol. 1. Stockholm: Almqvist & Wiksell International. ISBN 978-91-22-01565-9.
- Hore, Peter (2006). The Ironclads: an illustrated history of battleships from 1860 to the First World War. London: Southwater. ISBN 978-18447-6-299-6.
- Keegan, John (1989). The Price of Admiralty. New York: Viking. ISBN 978-0-670-81416-9.
- Lavery, Brian (1983). The Ship of the Line. Vol. 1: The Development of the Battlefleet 1650–1850. Conway Maritime Press. ISBN 978-0-85177-252-3.
- Mahan, A.T. (1890). The Influence of Sea Power Upon History 1660–1783. Boston: Little, Brown and Company. OCLC 1084844208.
- Parker, Geoffrey (1996). The Military Revolution: military innovation and the rise of the West, 1500–1800. Cambridge: Cambridge University Press. ISBN 978-0-521-47426-9.
- Parker, Geoffrey (2008). The Cambridge Illustrated History of Warfare: The Triumph of the West. Cambridge: Cambridge University Press. ISBN 978-05217-3-806-4.
- Prud’homme van Reine, R. (2001). Schittering en Schandaal: Dubbelbiografie van Maerten en Cornelis Tromp (in Dutch). Amsterdam; Antwerp: Arbeidspers. ISBN 978-90-295-3572-4.
- Rodger, Nicholas A.M. (2004). The Command of the Ocean, a Naval History of Britain 1649–1815. London: Allen Lane. ISBN 978-0-7139-9411-7.
- Rhode, Grant Frederick (2023). Great Power Clashes Along the Maritime Silk Road: Lessons from History to Shape Current Strategy. Naval Institute Press. ISBN 978-1682478677.
- Willmott (2005). The Battle of Leyte Gulf : The Last Fleet Action. Bloomington: Indiana University Press. ISBN 978-02530-0-351-5.
- Wilson, Ben (2014). Empire of the Deep: the Rise and Fall of the British Navy. London: Weidenfeld & Nicolson. ISBN 978-07538-2-920-2.
