= Cornelis Jol =

Dutch admiral (1597–1641)

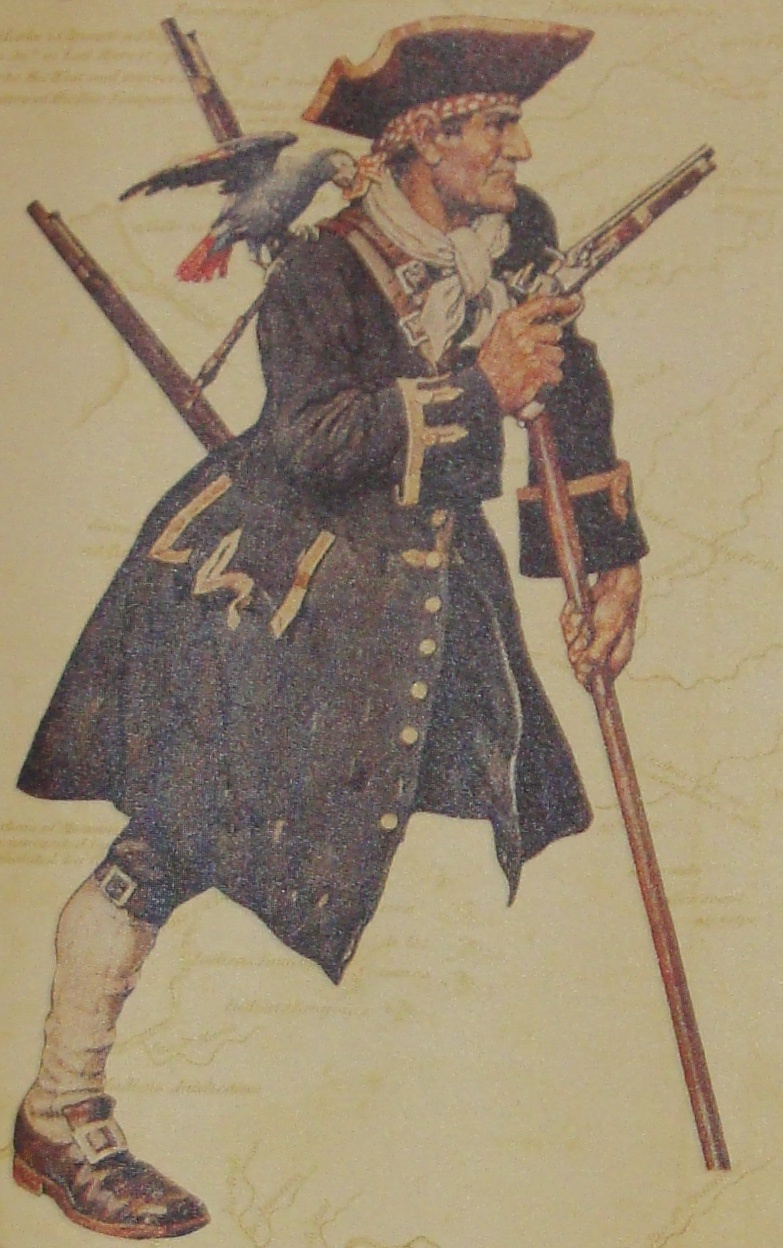
- Modern-day interpretation of Cornelis Cornelisz. Jol, as pictured in the Museo Puerta de Tierra in Campeche, Mexico.
- Born: 1597; Scheveningen, Dutch Republic
- Died: 31 October 1641 (aged 43–44); São Tomé, Portuguese São Tomé and Príncipe
- Piratical career
- Nickname: Houtebeen (Dutch); Perna de Pau (Portuguese); Pie de Palo (Spanish); El Pirata (Spanish)
- Type: Corsair
- Allegiance: Dutch Republic
- Years active: 1620s–1640s
- Rank: Admiral
- Battles: Eighty Years' War; Jan Janszoon van Hoorn's expedition of 1633; Battle of Cabañas; Battle of the Downs; Dutch-Portuguese War; Capture of Luanda; Capture of São Tomé

Cornelis Corneliszoon Jol (1597 – 31 October 1641), nicknamed Houtebeen ("pegleg"), was a 17th-century Dutch corsair and admiral in the Dutch West India Company during the Eighty Years' War between Spain and the Dutch Republic. He was one of several early buccaneers to attack Campeche, looting the settlement in 1633, and was active against the Spanish in the Spanish Main and throughout the Caribbean during the 1630s and 40s.

Jol was really more of a pirate (or rather privateer) than an admiral, raiding Spanish and Portuguese fleets and gathering large amounts of loot. When he was young he lost a leg for some unknown reason. He was therefore nicknamed Houtebeen (Perna de Pau in Portuguese and Pie de Palo in Spanish), and became one of the earliest documented pirates to use a wooden peg leg. The Spanish also nicknamed him El Pirata.

== Biography ==
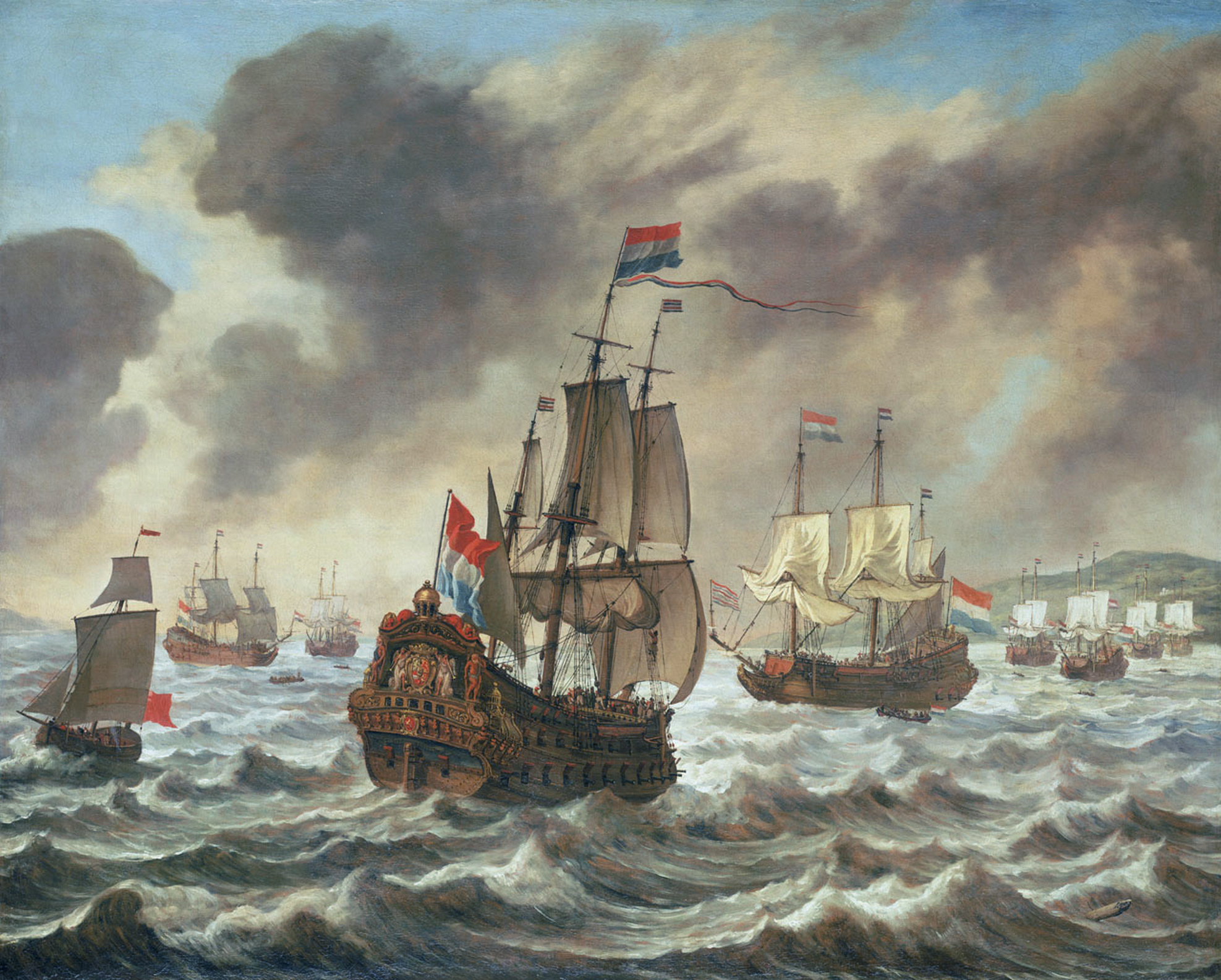
"Before the Battle of the Downs" by Reinier Nooms, ca. 1639. Cornelis Jol commanded a squadron of seven ships in this naval battle.

Cornelis Jol hailed from the fishing village of Scheveningen, administratively a borough of The Hague. He joined the Dutch West India Company in 1626 and quickly climbed the ranks to become admiral. He was a popular commander among the Dutch, with contemporary chroniclers commending his "courage and prudence, his integrity, resoluteness and tenacity of purpose."

Jol crossed the Atlantic Ocean nine times to attack the Spanish and Portuguese along the coast of Brazil and in the Caribbean. During one of his earliest voyages, he captured the island of Fernando de Noronha off the coast of Brazil, which remained a part of Dutch Brazil until 1654 under the name of Pavonia.

In 1633, he and Diego el Mulato attacked Campeche in the Yucatán Peninsula, then held by Spain, with a fleet of ten ships. In 1635 he was captured near Dunkirk by Dunkirk privateer Jacob Collaert but released some 6 months after.

With victory came fame, and demonisation by the Spanish upon whom he preyed. While attempting to capture the Spanish treasure fleet in 1638, he engaged in a naval battle with Spanish admiral Don Carlos Ibarra off the coast of Cuba. None of the treasure ships were captured however, as his captains refused to fight out of envy for Jol's promotion to admiral before them. In Spain, he was falsely reported to have been killed in the confrontation. He also commanded a squadron of seven ships at the Battle of the Downs under admiral Maarten Tromp, a decisive defeat of the Spanish, in 1639.

In 1640, while awaiting the Spanish treasure fleet again off Havana, Cuba, his fleet was caught in a hurricane and four of the ships were wrecked on the shore. In 1641, Jol set out from Brazil for the coast of Africa, where he took the city of Luanda (in Angola) and the island of São Tomé from the Portuguese. While on São Tomé, he was struck by malaria and died on 31 October 1641.

His son, also called Cornelis Corneliszoon Jol (or Hola), pursued a career at sea as well and served as an officer in the Dutch navy. He was captain of the Leiden, also under admiral Maarten Tromp during the First Anglo-Dutch War (1652–1654). A street in Scheveningen is named for Jol. Erstwhile AFC Ajax trainer Martin Jol is a direct descendant.
