= Jan Janszoon van Hoorn's expedition of 1633 =

Dutch privateering voyage to Yucatan

Van Hoorn's expedition
- Part of the Eighty Years' War
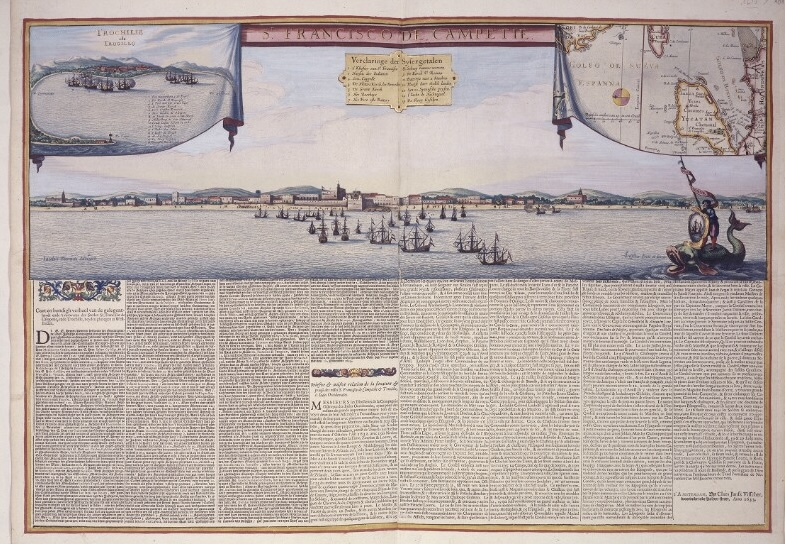
- The conquest of Campeche and Trujillo in 1633, by Claes Jansz. Visscher, after an original by Jacobus Dasniets.
| Date | 26 April – 11 November 1633 (Note: A splinter expedition under Cornelis Jol remained active during 18 September 1633 – 6 June 1634.) |
| Location | Spanish Main 18°N 89°W |
| Result | Dutch victory |

Belligerents
| Dutch Republic; West India Company | New Spain; Spanish Yucatan; Spanish Guatemala; Spanish Honduras |

Commanders and leaders
| Jan Janszoon van Hoorn (Note: Also Jansz, Jansz., Janse for Janszoon; and I for J, as in Ian for Jan. A WIC admiral and privateer.); Cornelis Jol; Diego el Mulato | Francisco Martínez de la Ribamontán Santander (Note: Governor of Spanish Honduras, but suspended in the first half of 1633, with Miranda filling in ad interim.); Juan de Miranda (Note: Captain general of Trugillo, but served as acting governor of Spanish Honduras during Santander's suspension in the first half of 1633.); Fernando Centeno Maldonado (Note: Governor of Spanish Yucatan.); Juan de Barros (Note: A Campeche alcalde.); Domingo Galván Romero (Note: A Campeche captain.) † |

Units involved
| 10 vessels (Note: Four schipen ('ships'): the Fama, (Note: Also Fam.) Middelburgh, (Note: Also Middelborgh.) Gonde-Leeuw (Note: Also Goude Leeuw.) and Zutphen. Three iachten ('yachts'): the Otter, Brack (Note: Also Braeck.) and Nachtegael. Three chaloupen ('shallops or sloops'): the Gijsselingh (Note: Also Gysselinghe, Gyselingh.) and two others.) | 2 port towns (Note: Trugillo, (Note: Also Trochilie, Truxillo, Trujillo.) Campeche. (Note: Also Campetie, Campeachy.)) |

Strength
| 518 sailors (Note: Excluding pressed crew: one mestizo and two Maya pilots, at least.); 420 infantry | 2,000 civilians (Note: Including militia. In Trugillo and San Pedro (in the port's vicinity): 200 vecinos, 400 Black and mulato people. In Campeche: 350 vecinos, 50 Black and mulato people, 1,000 Maya people.); 25 infantry; 25 cavalry |

Casualties and losses
| > 30 deaths; various wounded; various ill | > 60 deaths; various wounded; 20 detained; 27 laden vessels seized; 2 towns sacked, 1 torched |

In 1633, during the colonial theatre of the Eighty Years' War, admiral Jan Janszoon van Hoorn embarked on a privateering expedition against the Spanish in the Caribbean and Gulf of Mexico, under a late 1632 commission from the Dutch West India Company. With a fleet of ten vessels and a little over 900 men, van Hoorn successfully commandeered some two dozen laden Spanish merchantmen; captured, sacked, ransomed and torched Trugillo in Spanish Honduras; and captured and sacked Campeche in Spanish Yucatan. In addition, from late 1633 to early 1634, vice-admiral Cornelis Jol led a detached squadron on a cruise for further Spanish prize ships in the Greater and Lesser Antilles. The undertaking did not net as much profit as projected, but was nonetheless deemed a success for having exacted punishing losses on the Spanish, including scores of fatal casualties and the effective disarmament of Fort Santa Barbara in Trugillo.

The operation may have partly led to punitive measures against the Maya of Yucatan (a couple of whom worked with van Hoorn), or against the Spanish province's governor (who failed to safeguard Campeche). Alongside similar voyages by the said company's privateers in the early 1630s, van Hoorn's trip is thought to have helped the Dutch to establish a forward presence and oppose Spanish sea control in the region.

== Background ==
The West India Company (WIC) was chartered by the Dutch Republic in 1621, and spent the early and middle years of the 1620s building a privateering fleet to match Spanish naval power in the West Indies, which they arguably achieved by the decade's end, when WIC admiral Piet Heyn captured the Spanish silver fleet in 1628, during the Battle in the Bay of Matanzas, off northeastern Cuba. At some point after his victory, Heyn advised the board of directors to extend company reach farther west, into the Bay of Honduras, by commissioning a raid of Trugillo, a port and town in Spanish Honduras.

Apparently convinced of the wisdom of Heyn's counsel, on 4 June 1630, the WIC instructed privateers Jan Booneter and Adriaen Pater to surprise the silver fleet in Trugillo, one of their ports of call, if feasible. Booneter and Pater were unable to attempt an ambush though, so the company next, on 14 June 1632, directed privateer Galeyn von Stapels to chart the shores of the Yucatan peninsula and the waters of the Honduran and Campeche bays. And on 2 November of that year, the WIC finally commissioned a expedition focussed primarily on sacking Trugillo, entrusting the assault to privateer Jan Janszoon van Hoorn.

== Expedition ==
Van Hoorn embarked on his journey from Recife, in Dutch Brazil, on 26 April 1633, and touched at Bridgetown, in Barbados, on 20 May. The fleet spent a week victualling, then set out due northwest, sighting Puerto Rico on 18 June, and then Little Cayman on 5 July, where they anchored. Van Hoorn was joined in two days by the yacht Nachtegael and the sloop Gijsselingh, which had been cruising for laden Spanish vessels off nearby Cape Cruz since 29 June, and so brought in the expedition's first prize ship, a small merchantman loaded with hides, sugar and honey. The fleet now made whole, van Hoorn next set sail due southwest, finally bound for Honduras, sometime during 7–10 July.

=== Honduras ===
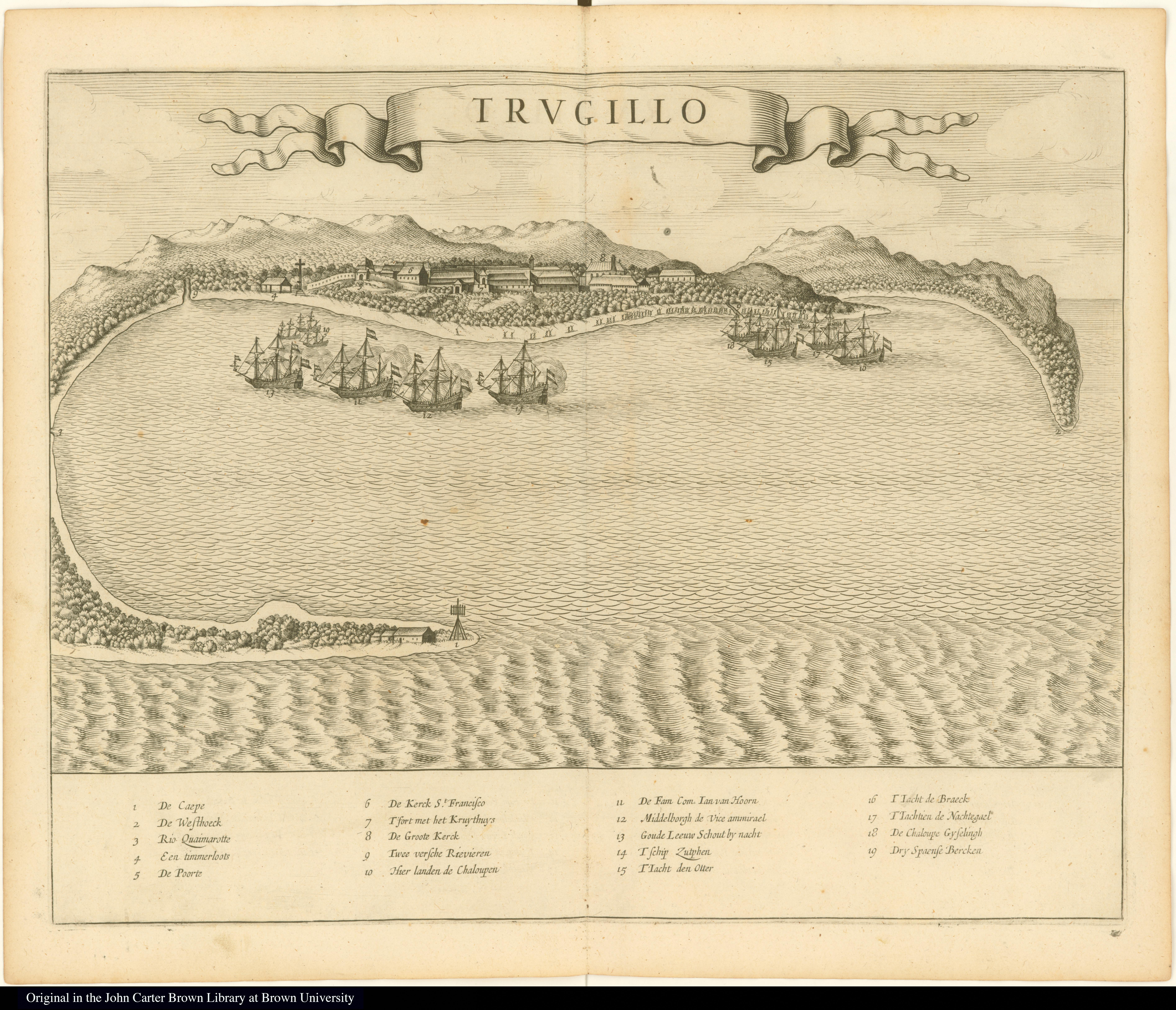
Trugillo (in de Laet's Historie) shows van Hoorn's landing in Trugillo Bay (east on left), with labels (1–19): 1. The cape (Note: Cape Honduras, ie Point Caxinas, easternmost point of Trugillo Bay.); 2. The west corner (Note: Westernmost point of Trugillo Bay, a small headland on Rio Guinea's mouth.); 3. Rio Quaimarotte (Note: Inlet to Laguna de Guaimoreto.); 4. A woodworking shed; 5. The gate; 6. The Church of S. Francisco; 7. The fort with the powder house; 8. The great church (Note: Possibly Iglesia de Trugillo.); 9. Two fresh rivers; 10. Here landed the sloops; 11. The Fam, capt. Ian van Hoorn; 12. The Middelborgh of the vice-admiral; 13. The Goude Leeuw, vice-admiral; 14. The ship Zutphen; 15. The yacht Otter; 16. The yacht Braeck; 17. The yacht Nachtegael; 18. The sloop Gyselingh; 19. Dry Spanish birch (Note: Possibly gumbo limbo.)

Van Hoorn sighted the Honduran mainland on 11 July. They spent the next three days charting the coastal waters, taking care to remain out of view of sentinels at Fort Santa Barbara in Trugillo. On 15 July, two hours past midday, the WIC fleet entered the port's harbour and came within plain view of the fort, which immediately opened fire, leaving four dead on the ship Zutphen, these being the expedition's first casualties. While the ships (the said Zutphen, plus the Fama, Middelburgh and Gonde-Leeuw) engaged the fort, van Hoorn's six smaller vessels (three yachts and three sloops) slipped away, disembarking armed men at the mouth of Santo Antonio Creek, (Note: Also Arroyo de San Antonio.) some 11 kilometres (7 mi) west of the fort. The cavalry column now marched east, and in short order reached the fort, which they took after outgunning its guards. With Santa Barbara captured, Trugillo was van Hoorn's within two hours, by about dusk. The WIC men rested in town that night, and spent the next morning of 16 July ransacking the local vecinos. Total casualties for this incursion were tallied at seven deaths among the Dutch, and 14 or 15 (vecinos) among the Spanish.

According to WIC director Joannes de Laet, who wrote and published the 1644 Historie, while van Hoorn went about pillaging Trugillo, with his men busy hauling the spoils to Fort Santa Barbara for safekeeping, a fire broke out in the eastern edge of town. As virtually all nearby wattle and daub structures had been roofed with highly flammable thatch palm, the flames easily jumped from building to building, becoming a conflagration that consumed some two-thirds of Trugillo in no time. The blaze also reached the local powder house, resulting in a sizeable blast that left some with serious burn lesions, which later proved fatal. The fire, naturally, cut into van Hoorn's plunder, but that which survived (or was salvaged) was loaded onto the Dutch ships the following day (on 17 July).

The WIC privateers spent the next two days in port negotiating Trugillo's release with the governor of Spanish Honduras, Francisco Martínez de la Ribamontán Santander, and his delegate in the port, captain general Juan de Miranda. On 19 July, van Hoorn agreed to a ransom of 20 pounds of silver, which de Miranda delivered in a couple days, whereupon the fleet departed on 21 July.

=== Campeche ===
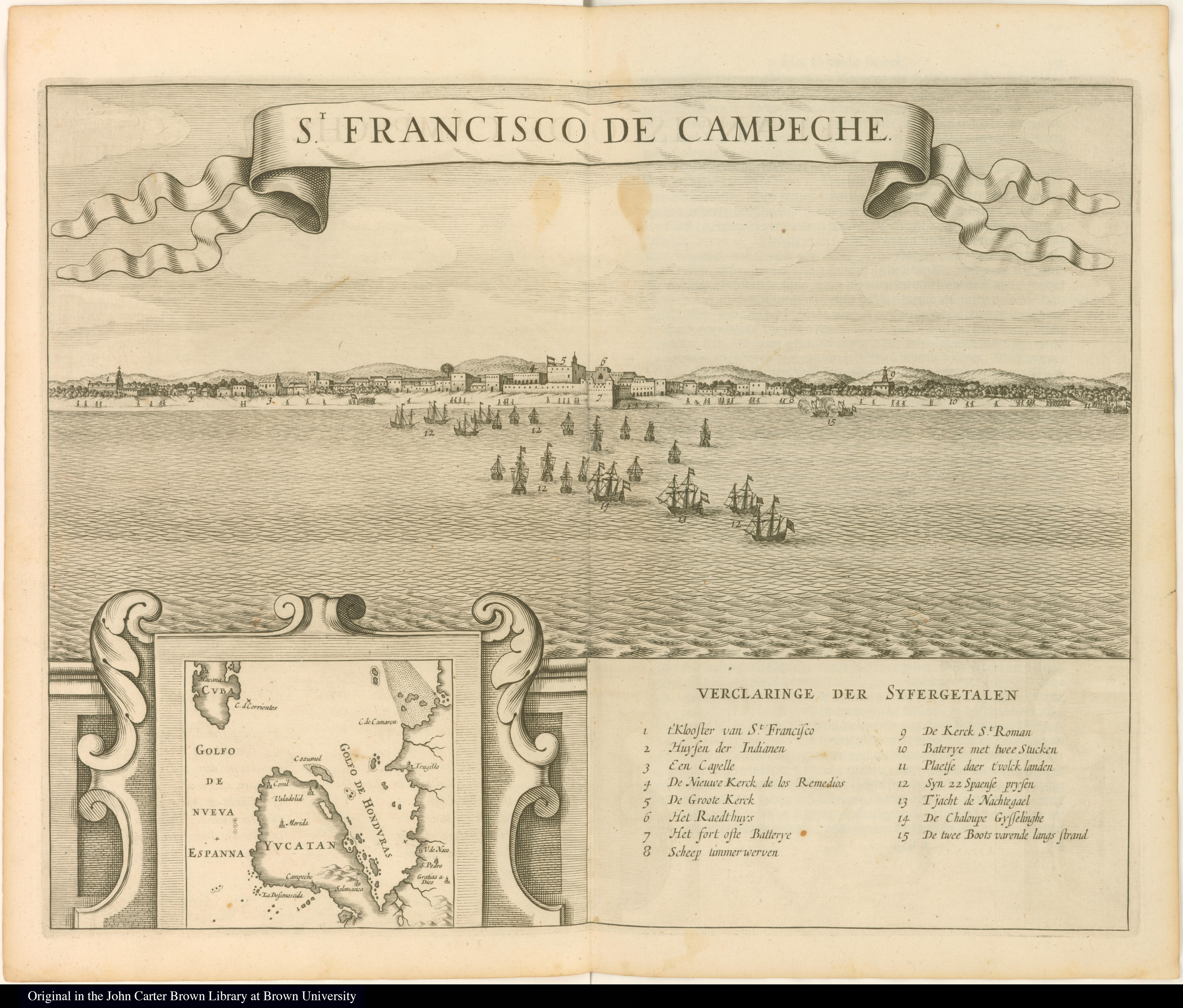
S. Francisco de Campeche (in de Laet's Historie) shows Yucatan (inset in bottom left) and van Hoorn's landing in Campeche Bay (top, northeast on left), with labels (1–15): 1. The convent of S. Francisco (Note: Now Parroquia or Iglesia de San Francisco on Av. Miguel Alemán and C. Mariano Escobedo.); 2. Indians' houses; 3. A chapel; 4. The new Church de los Remedios; 5. The great church; 6. The town hall; 7. The fort or battery; 8. Ship woodworking yards; 9. The Church S. Roman; 10. Two-piece battery; 11. Place where the men landed; 12. Here are 22 Spanish prizes; 13. The yacht Nachtegael; 14. The sloop Gysselinghe; 15. The two boats sailing along the beach

Van Hoorn had some difficulty circumnavigating the Yucatan Peninsula to enter the Bay of Campeche, as their nautical charts apparently proved inaccurate. They sighted Cozumel on 25 July, and Cape Catoche on 1 August, where they stopped for fresh water and provisions. Here, they seized an unladen Spanish merchant frigate, (Note: Urcas in Spanish. The urca was a sort of frigate used as merchant vessel, with a full-bodied hull, and a shorter length overall than frigates used as warships.) from whose crew they learnt of a naval squadron cruising for them, with instructions to transport the Dutch privateers to Saint Martin, a WIC salt works station which, to their surprise, had been captured by the Spanish earlier that year. They nonetheless proceeded west, rounded Point Boxcohuo, (Note: In modern Celestun.) and entered the bay, sighting the port town of Campeche on the afternoon of 11 August. The privateer fleet anchored some 19 or 24 kilometres (12 or 15 mi) east-northeast of the same.

According to de Laet's Historie, van Hoorn then set about 400 of his men in shallow-draught boats to approach the shore, so as to reconnoitre the town and prepare a well-organized landing. On the following morning of 13 August, the boats were beached at about 2.4 kilometres (1.5 mi) southwest of the Campeche. The infantry then disembarked in orderly columns, and marched northeast to the port, with defensive cover provided by two of the said shallow boats, and the sloops Nachtegael and Gijsselingh, which coasted along. Their bold approach, naturally, did not go unnoticed, as Spanish mounted troops and foot soldiers raced out to meet them, but these were soon repelled by fire from the Dutch boats and sloops. After storming three dry moats just outside the town walls, the privateers managed to infiltrate Campeche up to its central plaza, which had been barricaded by the Spanish.

The ensuing engagement was reportedly swift and fierce, with van Hoorn breaching the Spanish blockade so fast as to only allow the latter time for one cannon shot, after which the Spanish resisted capture so keenly as to only leave the Dutch with 20 prisoners. In the end, though, the WIC men captured the plaza and thereby Campeche, whereupon they, as in Trugillo, set about looting the vecinos and demanding ransom from the cabildo. The latter project ultimately came to naught, as alcalde Juan de Barros stoutly refused to negotiate with van Hoorn, citing a real cedula prohibiting doing so. Consequently, on 17 August, the expeditionaries left the port with their Spanish prisoners, nine Spanish prize ships, and all the plunder they had managed to find. Unlike Trugillo, structures in this town were not inflammable, being stonebuilt, such that Campeche escaped a torching, though the men did burn the vessels and barges that had lain in port prior to departing for the outer harbour.

While the privateer fleet lay in a nearby anchorage, to transfer their spoils from the Spanish prizes onto their own ships, a delegation of vecinos approached the men to ransom their prisoners and five of the nine commandeered vessels. With that business concluded, on the morning of 24 August, van Hoorn departed the harbour, setting course for the Yucatan Channel and the Greater Antilles to the east. According to local cronista de Indias Diego López de Cogolludo, the ransomed Spanish vecinos were marooned some four leguas (19 km or 12 mi) outside the port town.

=== Division and return ===
Dutch vessels in circa 1660, including a WIC yacht (right)

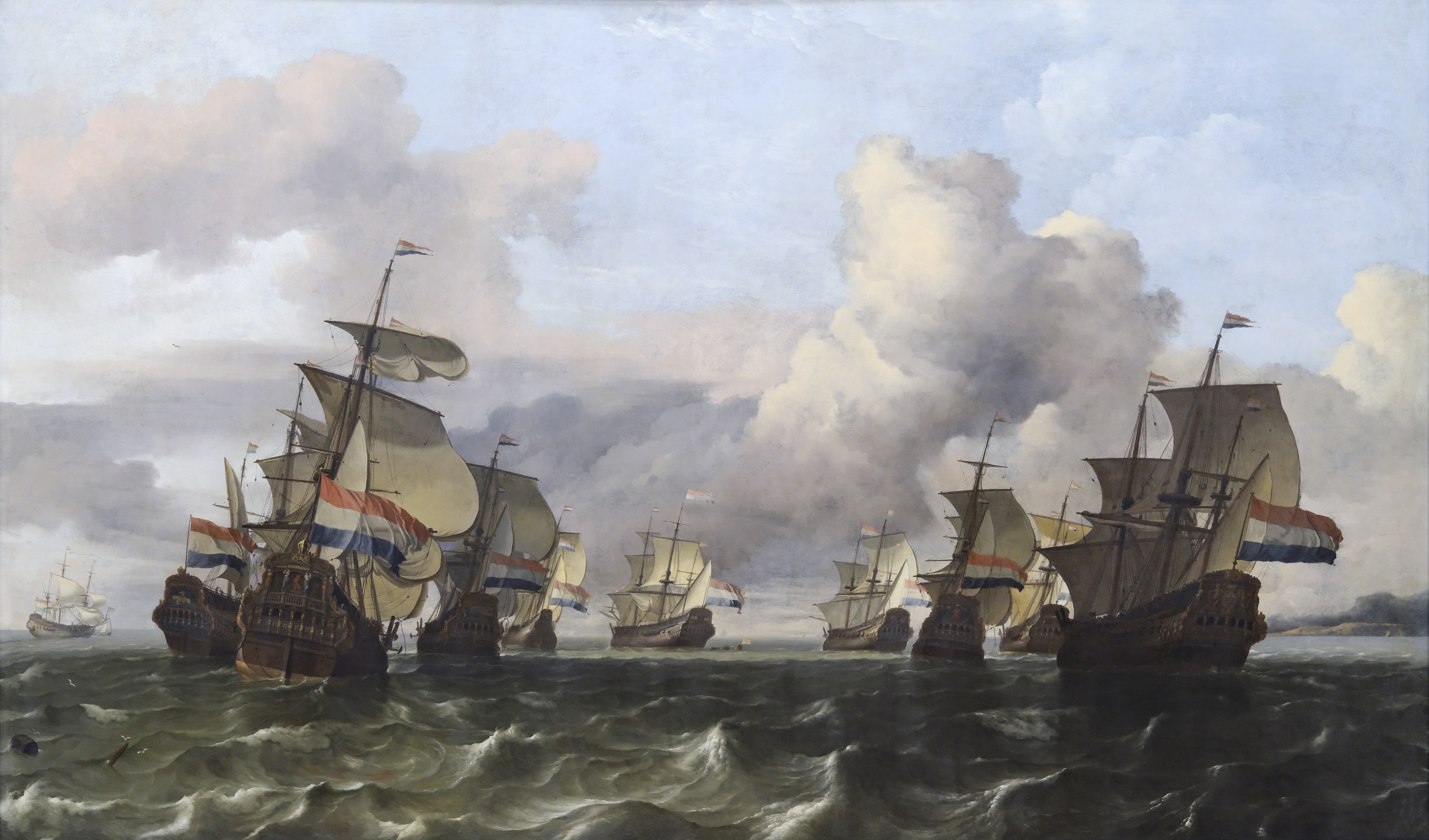
WIC vessels in circa 1675

Van Hoorn entered the Straits of Florida by 18 September, when the WIC fleet came within some 39 or 43 kilometres (24 or 27 mi) of Pan de Matanzas, a prominent hill and sea mark near modern Matanzas, Cuba. At this point, some of the company wished to cruise for additional Spanish prizes before leaving the West Indies. Consequently, the admiral left the Otter, Nachtegael and the sloops under the command of Cornelis Jol, and then proceeded with the rest of the fleet (the ships and the Brack) to open ocean via the Old Bahama Channel. Van Hoorn reached Texel, North Holland on 11 November 1633, thus bringing the main leg of the privateering expedition to a close.

Jol's splinter division were to set course back to Cape San Antonio, on Cuba's east, and from there cruise the southern coast of said island, stopping in Tortuga, in Hispaniola's northwest, to ascertain whether the Spanish had really captured Saint Martin, and thereafter undertake "what is convenient in the service of the Company".

According to de Laet, on 24 September, Jol engaged a Spanish galleon near Cabo Corrientes. On 24 October, the privateers captured a merchant barge laden with 30 barrels of wine. In the first half of November, the Otter had to be grounded broadside for maintenance and repairs, during which respite an Englishman confirmed the rumours regarding Saint Martin's capture. Jol set out again on the evening of 13–14 December. That night, the WIC men sighted a Spanish flotilla of some 15 vessels, and decided to shadow them. At some point after daybreak, a single ship broke off from the flotilla, and was promptly attacked by Jol's squadron, who disabled her mainsail and then boarded and searched her hold. To their disappointment, she carried only ballast, and so was let go. On 16 December, the men again came upon a Spanish fleet, this one of 31 ships, and likewise tailed this convoy at a distance. On 19 December, they seized a straggler frigate but once again found no cargo on her.

Jol carried on in the aforesaid manner for a while, extending his Caribbean cruise up to April 1634. They departed on 27 April, and made port in Texel on 6 June. According to de Laet, this splinter cruise netted the WIC at least three more prizes.

== Aftermath ==
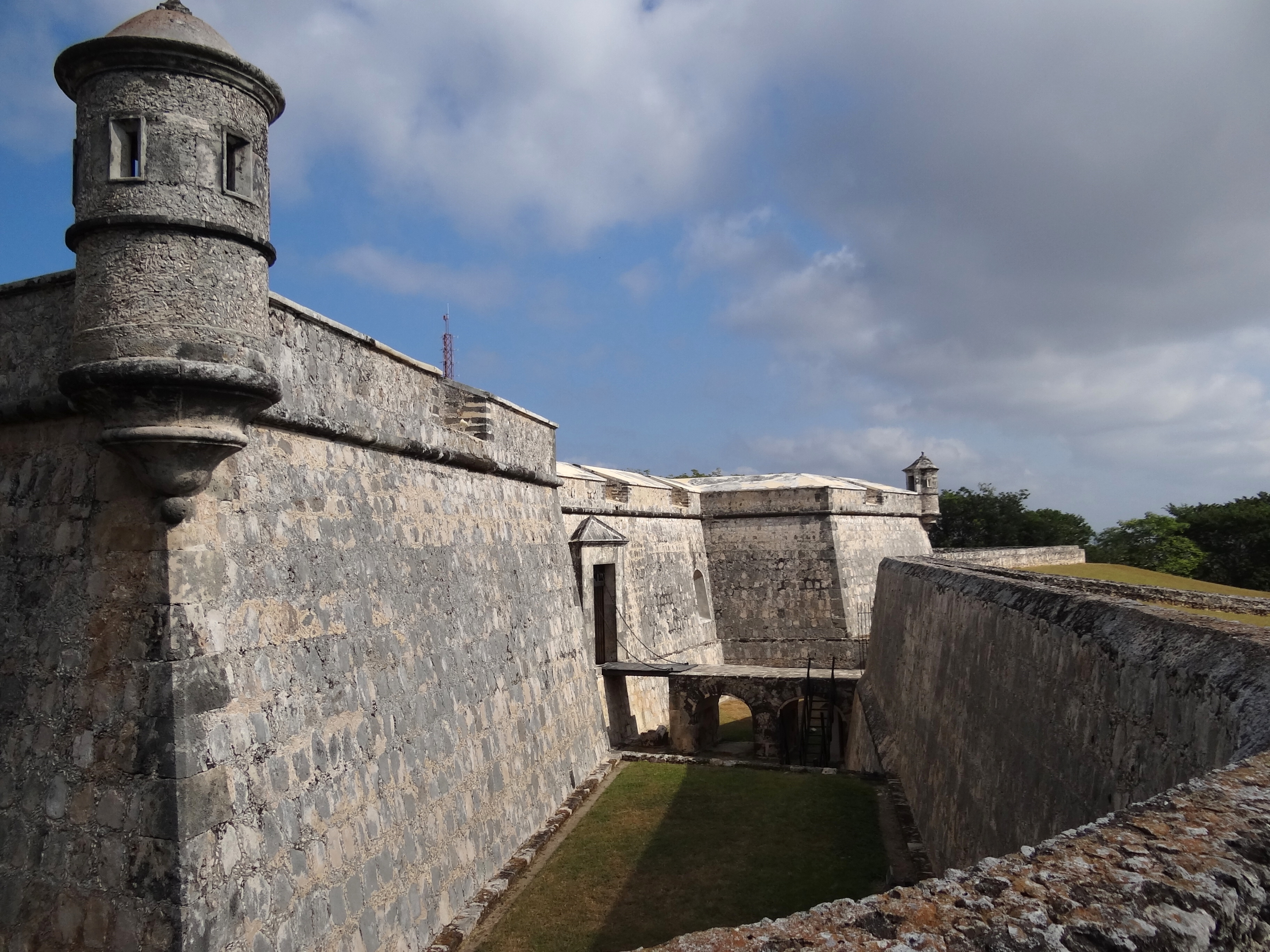
The Maya of Yucatan had to help fund Campeche's fortifications after van Hoorn's sacking (18th century fortress shown)

In the last quarter of 1633, the governor of Spanish Yucatan, Fernando Centeno Maldonado, requisitioned funds from the local treasuries of a number of the province's reduccion or encomienda settlements, all of which were majority Maya. The extraordinary move was officially termed an emergency measure, ostensibly concerning only surplus cash in the said treasuries, to be diverted towards fortifying Campeche, whose defences van Hoorn had just proven unbearably weak. However, University of Toulouse historian Georges Baudot reckons that the measure may have rather (or additionally) been punitive, given the publicly-evident cooperation of two Maya pilots with the WIC men during the port town's sacking.

Maldonado, in turn, was stripped of his office in 1636, due at least in part to his failure to defend Campeche, according to Mexican anthropologist Román Piña Chan, of the National School of Anthropology and History. The former governor fell ill and died in Hecelchakan, while en route to Mexico to plead his case for reinstatement before the Real Audiencia.

As with Campeche, Trugillo too was deemed in urgent need of fortification, given that Fort Santa Barbara had been essentially dismantled, having lost much of its ordnance, including all ten cannons. The port town's defences could not be shored up until the latter half of 1639 though, when the fort was finally (technically) rearmed, though Spanish authorities only managed to supply harquebuses.

As regards Dutch affairs, University of Florida historian Cornelis Ch. Goslinga notes that "van Hoorn's mission was no outstanding financial success" for the WIC, though concedes it nonetheless "did bring about definite military and monetary advantages", and adds that Jol's splinter cruise "was generally considered a not unprofitable raiding voyage around the Caribbean".

== Legacy ==
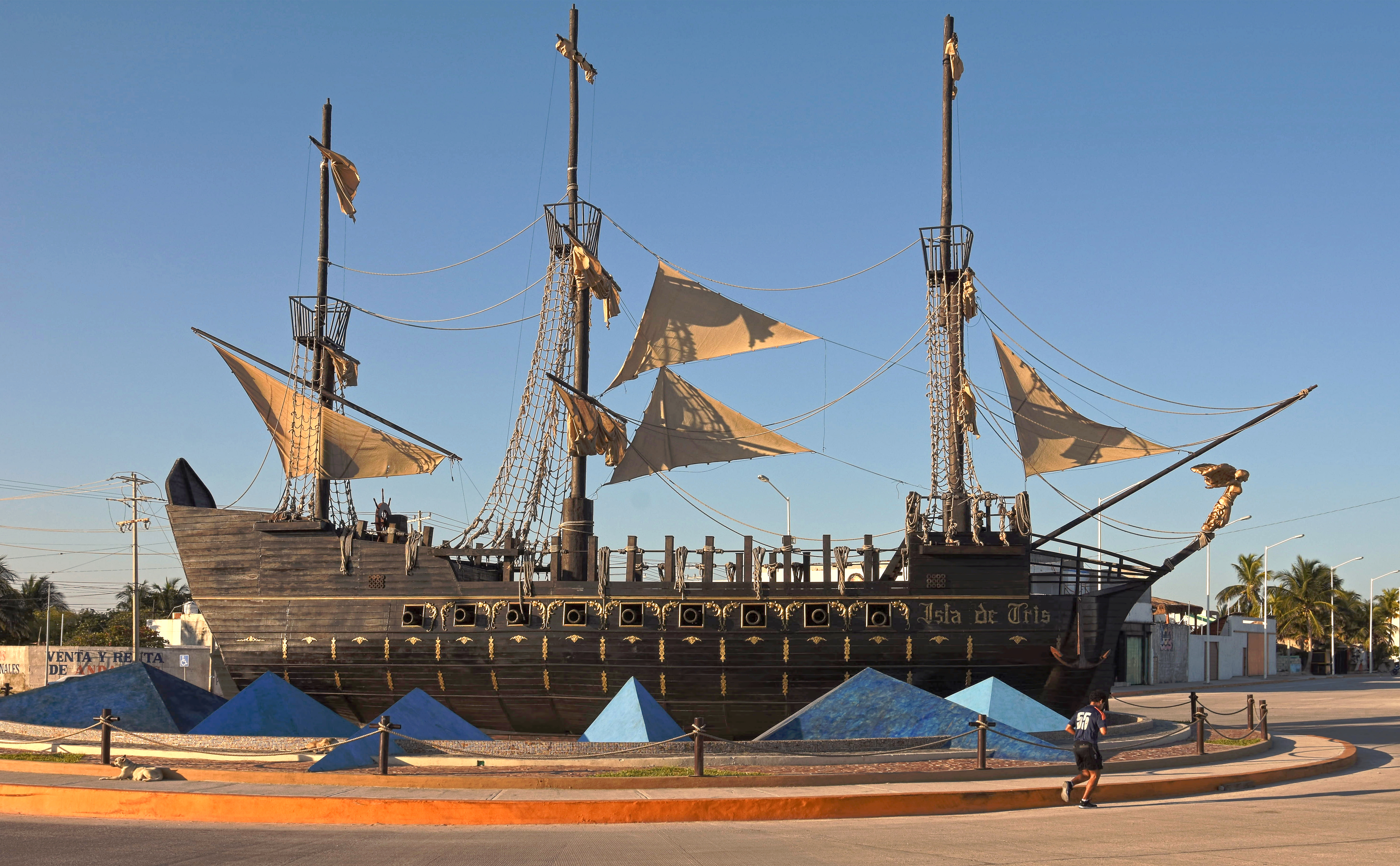
Van Hoorn's sacking of Campeche endured in local myths and legends centuries later (modern pirate ship replica in Carmen, Campeche shown)

Goslinga reckons that the van Hoorn expedition, alongside contemporary WIC voyages to the West Indies, might plausibly amount to a "Dutch invasion", concluding that "the years from 1629 to 1633 were five years of tremendous activity and vigorous output for the West India Company. The most important consequence of the Dutch invasion of the Caribbean was undoubtedly the crucial destruction of Spanish naval power". They seemingly concurred with de Laet's estimation of van Hoorn's capture of Campeche, of which the latter said, "for a long time this has been one of the most courageous acts committed by so few people".

Universidad Autónoma Metropolitana scholar Leticia Algaba Martínez argues that the sacking of Campeche, a traumatic episode that town's denizens, was mythicized after some time, and then romanticized by the 19th century, as part of the broader phenomenon with pirates in popular culture. For instance, the raid features prominently in Justo Sierra O'Reilly's El filibustero: Leyenda del siglo xvii, an historical romance, serialized in 1841–1842, which is set in Campeche and follows protagonists Conchita and her father's killer, Diego el Mulato.

Baudot suggests that the two Maya pilots that van Hoorn pressed prior to reaching Campeche may have rather joined the WIC men voluntarily, and tentatively deems the act a precedent-setting example for 17th century opposition to Spanish rule by Yucatan's Maya residents.

== See also ==
- Piracy in the Bay of Honduras
- Naval history of the Dutch Republic

== Notes and references ==
=== References ===
1. anon. (1841). "Enero fascículo s.n. – diciembre fascículo s.n.". Museo Yucateco. Vol. 1. Campeche: Impreso por José María Peralta. pp. 1–480. OCLC 610592388. Archived from the original on 10 October 2023.
2. Aa, A. J. van der (1860). "Jol (Kornelis Korneliszoon)". Biographisch woordenboek der Nederlanden, bevattende levensbeschrijvingen van zoodanige personen, die zich op eenigerlei wijze in ons vaderland hebben vermaard gemaakt, voortgezet door K. J. R. van Harderwijk en Dr. G. D. J. Schotel. Vol. 9 (1st ed.). Haarlem: J.J. van Brederode. pp. 162–165. OCLC 12789863.
3. Algaba Martínez, Leticia (2008). "El filibustero : la novela y la leyenda". Revista Fuentes Humanísticas. 20 (37): 63–73. ISSN 2007-5618. Archived from the original on 16 August 2022.
4. Baudot, Georges (1986). "Dissidences indiennes et complicités flibustières dans le Yucatán du XVII e siècle". Cahiers du monde hispanique et luso-brésilien. sn (46): 21–33. doi:10.3406/carav.1986.2260. JSTOR 40852876.
5. Boer, Michael G. de (1900). "Een memorie over den toestand der West Indische Compagnie in het jaar 1633". Bijdragen en Mededelingen van het Historisch Genootschap te Utrecht. 21 (sn): 343–362. hdl:2027/hvd.32044105184527.
6. Brito Benítez, Eva Leticia (2017). "Pirate Assaults and the Defense of the Old Seaport of Campeche, Mexico (16th -18th Centuries)". Journal of Global and Area Studies. 1 (1): 15–32. ISSN 2586-0305. JSTOR 40852876.
7. Cardona Amaya, José Manuel (2020). Invasiones de corsarios a la Honduras de Felipe IV (1633–1643) (1st ed.). Tegucigalpa: Universidad Nacional Autónoma de Honduras. ISBN 9789992612620. OCLC 1192967317.
8. Elias, Johan Engelbert (1963) [First published 1903 by Loosjes]. "93. Jan Jansz. van Hoorn". De vroedschap van Amsterdam, 1578–1795, met een inleidend woord van den archivaris der stad Amsterdam Mr. W.R. Veder. Vol. 1 (2nd ed.). Amsterdam: N. Israel. pp. 295–298. OCLC 901720907.
9. Fernández Duro, Cesário (1898). AÑO 1621–1652. Historia de la armada española desde la unión de los reinos de Castilla y de León. Vol. 4 (1st ed.). Madrid: Establecimiento tipográfico Sucesores de Rivadeneyra. hdl:2027/mdp.39015036698705. OCLC 4413652.
10. Goslinga, Cornelis Christiaan (2017) [First published 1971 by Gorcum]. The Dutch in the Caribbean and on the Wild Coast 1580–1680. Florida and the Caribbean Open Books Series (Reprint of 1st ed.). Gainesville: University of Florida Press. OCLC 1019881329.
11. Laet, Joannes de (1916) [First published 1644 by Bonaventure & Abraham Elsevier]. Livro I – livro VII, ou 1623–1630 (e acontecimentos 1621–1622). Historie ofte iaerlijck verhael van de verrichtinghen der geoctroyeerde West-Indische Compagnie, zedert haer begin, tot het eynde van 't jaer sesthien-hondert ses-en-dertich; begrepen in derthien boecken, ende met verscheyden koperen platen verciert [Historia ou annaes dos feitos da Companhia privilegiada das Indias occidentaes desde o seu começo até ao fim do anno de 1636]. Vol. 1. Translated by Duarte Pereira, Jose Hygino; Souto Maior, Pedro. Rio de Janeiro: Officinas Graphicas da Bibliotheca Nacional. hdl:2027/coo.31924020373316. OCLC 17014789.
12. Laet, Joannes de (1925) [First published 1644 by Bonaventure & Abraham Elsevier]. Livro VIII – livro XIII, ou 1631–1636 (e atividades da companhia 1623–1636). Historie ofte iaerlijck verhael van de verrichtinghen der geoctroyeerde West-Indische Compagnie, zedert haer begin, tot het eynde van 't jaer sesthien-hondert ses-en-dertich; begrepen in derthien boecken, ende met verscheyden koperen platen verciert [Historia ou annaes dos feitos da Companhia privilegiada das Indias occidentaes desde o seu começo até ao fim do anno de 1636]. Vol. 2. Translated by Duarte Pereira, Jose Hygino; Souto Maior, Pedro. Rio de Janeiro: Officinas Graphicas da Bibliotheca Nacional. hdl:2027/njp.32101068325834. OCLC 17014789.
13. Laet, Joannes de (1934) [First published 1644 by Bonaventure & Abraham Elsevier]. Naber, S. P. l'Honoré (ed.). Boek VIII – boek X, of 1631–1633. Historie ofte iaerlijck verhael van de verrichtinghen der geoctroyeerde West-Indische Compagnie, zedert haer begin, tot het eynde van 't jaer sesthien-hondert ses-en-dertich; begrepen in derthien boecken, ende met verscheyden koperen platen verciert. Vol. 3. Hague: Martinus Nijhoff. OCLC 6106946.
14. Laet, Joannes de (1937) [First published 1644 by Bonaventure & Abraham Elsevier]. Naber, S. P. l'Honoré (ed.). Boek XI – boek XIII, of 1634–1636 (en overzicht van bedrijfsactiviteiten 1623–1636). Historie ofte iaerlijck verhael van de verrichtinghen der geoctroyeerde West-Indische Compagnie, zedert haer begin, tot het eynde van 't jaer sesthien-hondert ses-en-dertich; begrepen in derthien boecken, ende met verscheyden koperen platen verciert. Vol. 4. Hague: Martinus Nijhoff. OCLC 6106946.
15. López de Cogolludo, Diego (1688). Historia de Yucathan (1st ed.). Madrid: Por Jvan Garcia Infanzen. OCLC 85799316.
16. O Torres, Rodrigo Alejandro de la (2020). DE CORSARIOS, MARES Y COSTAS : El corso en la construcción del espacio y experiencias marítimas en el Golfo-Caribe, 1527–1620 (1st ed.). Ciudad Universitaria: Universidad Autónoma de Aguascalientes. OCLC 1280054563.
17. Pérez Martínez, Héctor (1937). Piraterías en Campeche (Siglos XVI, XVII, y XVIII). Enciclopedia ilustrada mexicana; no. 6 (1st ed.). México, D.F.: Porrúa hnos. y cía. OCLC 5285247.
18. Piña Chan, Román (2017) [First published 1977 by SEP & INAH]. Campeche durante el período colonial (4th ed.). Ciudad de México: Cámara de Diputados. OCLC 1192967317.
