= Battle of Cabañas =

1638 naval battle

- Part of the Eighty Years War
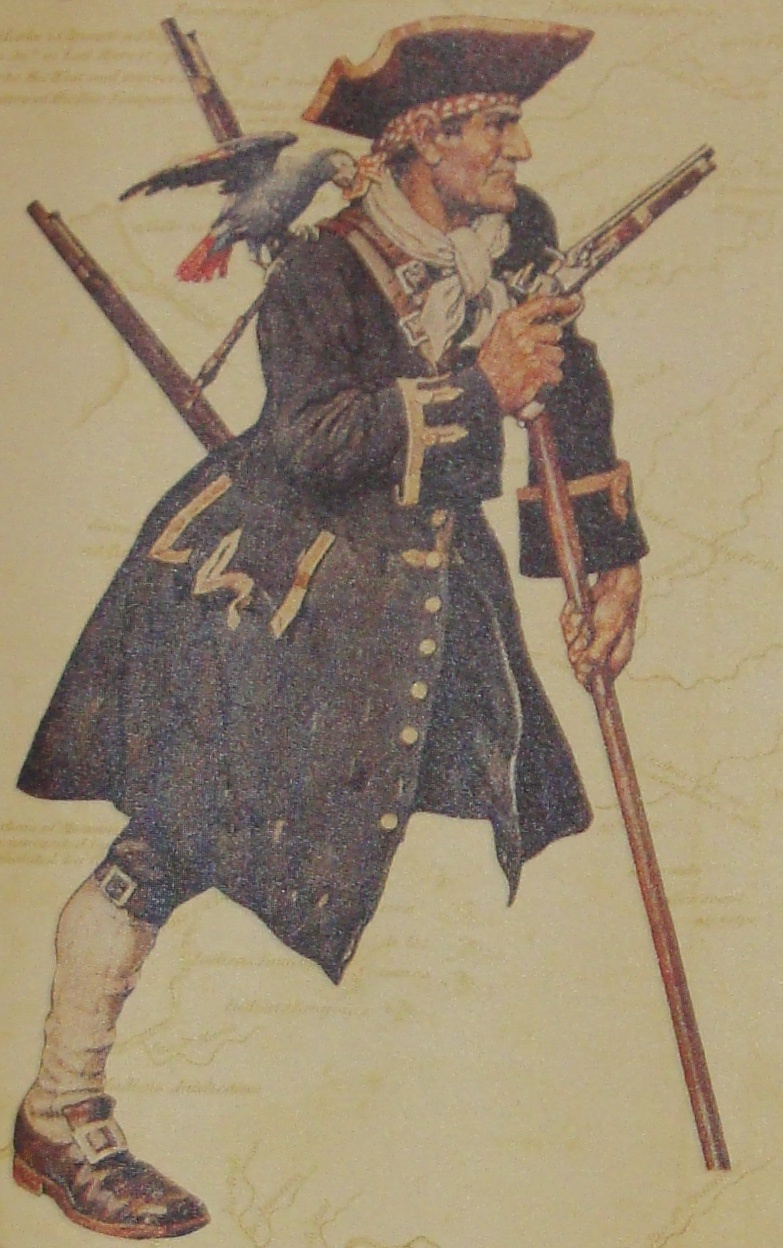
Date	31 August – 3 September 1638
Location	Cabañas, Cuba
Result	Spanish victory

Belligerents
Spain	Dutch Republic

Commanders and leaders
(Spanish Empire) Carlos de Ibarra (WIA)	(Dutch West India Company) Cornelis Jol

Strength
7 galleons 7 pataches 7 minor ships	17 galleons

Casualties and losses
Several ships damaged	7 galleons sunk Many crewmen killed

The Battle of Cabañas was an attempt in 1638 by Dutch privateer Cornelis Jol to capture the Spanish treasure fleet captained by Carlos de Ibarra. The naval battle, framed in the Eighty Years' War, ended with the Dutch fleet retreating after suffering heavy damage.

== Background ==
A Spanish fleet sailed off from Cádiz to the Indies on April 29, 1638, commanded by Carlos de Ibarra. In their way, they reached Isla Tortuga, a usual center of foreign piracy, and upon finding the pirate settlements and plantations lightly defended due to the absence of the pirate crews, they destroyed them. Among the pirates there were many privateers for the Dutch Republic, leading to Admiral Jol to come out of Texel in May 1638 with 10 galleons in order to try to capture the 1638 Spanish treasure ships. After being joined by 16 other galleons, he arrived in Cuba and patrolled around Havana to intercept the Spanish in July.

On August 26, the authorities of Havana sent a messenger ships to Veracruz, arriving on September 2, thanks to which the Veracruz treasure ships managed to evade the enemy ships. However, the message failed to reach Cartagena de Indias in time, so Ibarra and the Veracrucian treasure fleet left on August 7 unaware of Jol' trap. On August 30, the Spanish galleon Nuestra Señora de Regla discovered the Dutch ships.

== Battle ==
Jol advanced with 17 galleons in two parallel formations while Ibarra ordered to form a defensive line. Jol's 54-gun flagship, along with two other Dutch ships, attacked Ibarra's similarly 54-gun galleon San Mateo, but Ibarra ordered not to fire until the enemy ships were the closest possible, the tactic called fuego a la española ("Spanish Fire"). He waited enough than one of the Dutch ships actually collided with the San Mateo and Ibarra received light wounds by a grenade, but the delay paid off, with the Spanish artillery dealing enough direct damage to the three ships that they broke off. The rest of the fleets joined the fight, with viceadmiral Abraham Rosendal fighting his Spanish counterpart Pedro Ursúa. After eight hours of battle, having lost 7 galleons, Jol ordered to retreat.

Three days later, Jol launched a new attack. As the forces were closer in proportion now, with 10 Dutch ships between the 7 Spanish galleons and support ships, he ordered his fleet to keep distance and capitalize on their higher number of guns to pepper the Spanish from afar. They cannoned especially the galleon Nuestra Señora del Carmen, captained by Sancho Urdanivia, whom they wrongly believed to be the Spanish flagship due to its similar size and the fact that it had accidentally been separated from the main fleet. The Carmen advanced and managed to forced them to back down, although it was damaged to the point Ibarra had to deploy divers to repair its water leaks in midst of the fights. Eventually, having suffered new damage in his fleet, Jol called for retreat again.

There would not be a third day of battle. Demoralized by the casualties, which included the death of Rosendal and the captains Jan Mast and Jan Verdist, the rest of Jol's captains refused to attack again, and Jol withdrew his fleet not to return. For his part, suspecting of Dutch reinforcements, and not wanting to risk losing a battle of attrition against an even bigger enemy, Ibarra headed for Veracruz, with the Nuestra Señora del Carmen being diverted to Havana for reparations.

== Aftermath ==
The news of the battle were received with dismay in the Dutch Republic and among the pirate communities. Ibarra reached Veracruz on September 34, hosting celebrations for the victory, although he decided to wait for January 1639 to resume the travel in combination with the treasure fleet of Martín Orbea. King Philip IV rewarded Ibarra by making him Viscount of Centenera and Marquis of Taracena. The Spanish mistakenly believed Jol had been killed in action.

== Bibliography ==
- Fernández Duro, Cesáreo (1903). La Armada Española desde la unión de los reinos de Castilla y Aragón. Tipográfico.
- Fernández Duro, Cesáreo (1881). Disquisiciones náuticas. Tomo II. La mar descrita por los mareantes. Instituto de Historia y Cultura Naval. Madrid.
- Francis Lang, Mervyn. Las Flotas de la Nueva España (1630-1710): despacho, azogue, comercio. Muñoz Moya. Sevilla, 1998.
- Marley, David. Wars of the Americas: a chronology of armed conflict in the New World, 1492 to the present. ABC-CLIO, 1998.
- De la Pezuela, Jacobo (1868). Historia de la isla de Cuba. Tomo II (in Spanish). Madrid: C. Bailly-Baillière. pp. 88–92.
- Rodríguez González, Agustín Ramón (July 2001). "Los combates de Cabañas, agosto-septiembre de 1638". Revista General de Marina. pp. 77–81.
- Saiz Cidoncha, Carlos. Historia de la piratería en América española. Editorial San Martín. Madrid, 1985.
- Ullivarri, Saturnino. Piratas y corsarios en Cuba. Renacimiento. Colección Isla de la Tortuga, 2004, pages 206–212.
- Zaragoza, Justo. Piraterías y agresiones de los ingleses en la América española. Editorial Renacimiento, 2005, pages 236–237.
