= Miguel de Horna =

Miguel de Horna was a 17th-century Spanish admiral, originally from Navarre in Northern Spain. Active during the Eighty Years War, in 1636 he was appointed commander of the Armada of Flanders; based in Dunkirk, it was the most effective Spanish naval unit, operating primarily against Dutch merchant convoys. These included the Battle off Lizard Point in February 1637, when he sank three Dutch escorts and captured 14 merchant ships, and the action of 18 February 1639. He was also present at the Battle of the Downs in October 1639, when he was one of the few commanders to break through and reach Dunkirk.

== Sources ==
- Stradling, Robert (1992). The Armada of Flanders: Spanish Maritime Policy and European War, 1568-1668. CUP. ISBN 978-0521405348.
