= Dunkirkers =

Pro-Spanish commerce raiders during the Dutch Revolt

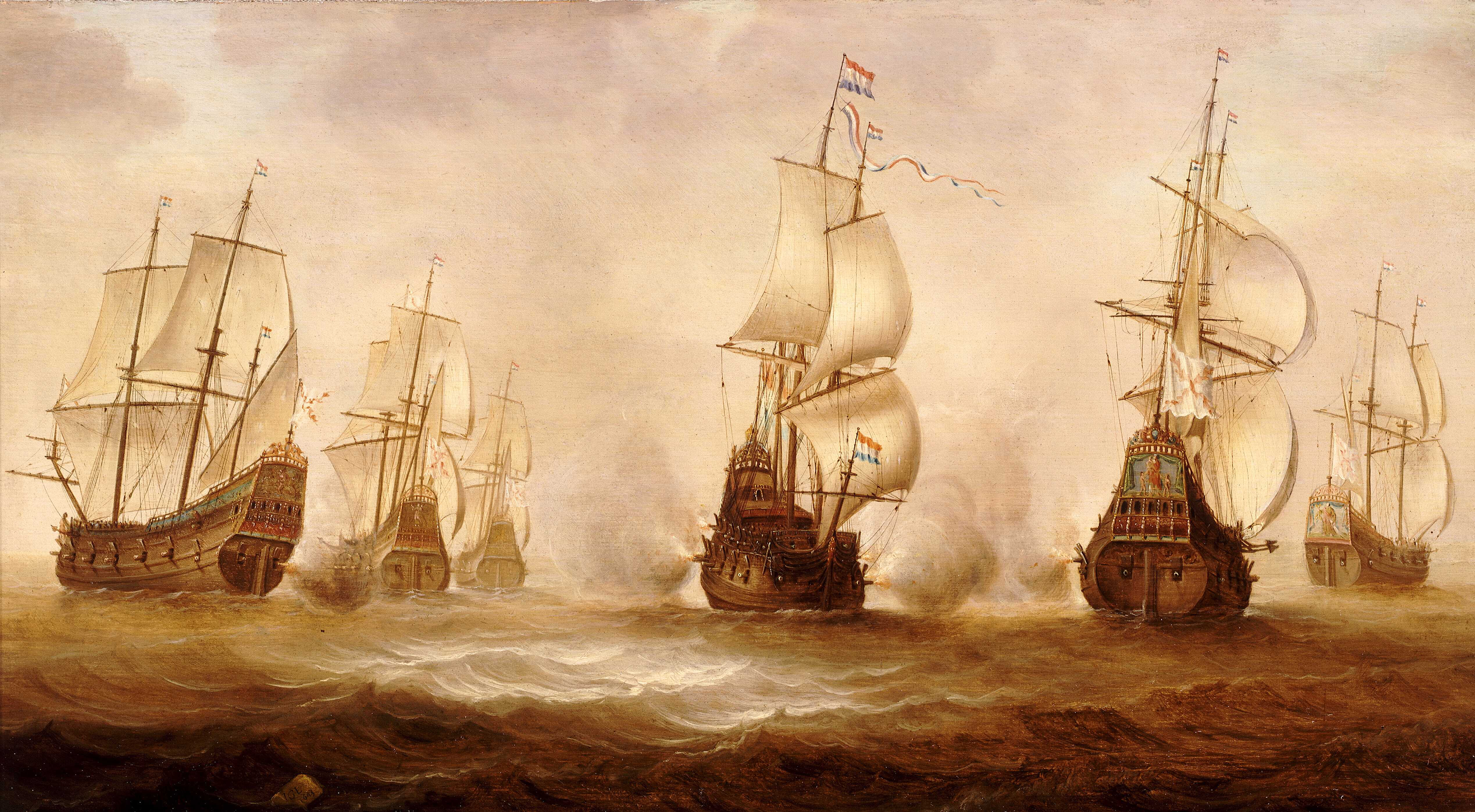
Dutch warships under Witte de With fighting against Dunkirkers off Nieuwpoort in 1640

During and after the Dutch Revolt (1568–1648), the Dunkirkers or Dunkirk Privateers were commerce raiders in the service of the Spanish monarchy and later the Kingdom of France. They operated from the ports of the Flemish coast: Nieuwpoort, Ostend, and Dunkirk.

Although their existence predated him, Dunkirkers were mainly organized under the rule of Spanish governor Alexander Farnese. The first Dunkirkers sailed a group of warships outfitted by the Spanish government, but non-government investment in privateering soon led to a more numerous fleet of privately owned and outfitted warships. They were part of the Dunkirk fleet, which consequently was a part of the Spanish monarchy's Flemish fleet, the Armada de Flandes, and worked in cooperation with admirals like Francisco de Ribera and Miguel de Horna.

Throughout the Eighty Years' War, the fleet of the Dutch Republic repeatedly tried to destroy the Dunkirkers, but they remained active and prolific. Some Dutch people came to regard Dunkirk as the "Algiers and Tunis of the West", in reference to the predatory Barbary corsairs. Dunkirker activity declined with Spain's final loss of Dunkirk in 1658, although substantial privateering activity continued to operate out of other Flemish ports. Dunkirkers would later enter the service of France, until their suppression was agreed in the 1712 Peace of Utrecht.

== Origins and function ==
Dunkirk was in the hands of the Dutch rebels from 1577 until 1583, when Alexander Farnese, Duke of Parma re-established the sovereignty of his uncle Philip II of Spain as count of Flanders. Dunkirk was, at the time, an important, strategically positioned port with its approaches shielded by sandbanks. In 1583, Parma assembled a small royal squadron of warships to destroy Dutch naval trade and fisheries. However, it did not take long before the Habsburg authorities in the Low Countries began issuing letters of Marque, and privately owned warships filled the ranks of the Dunkirkers. These privately owned warships were known in Dutch as the particulieren, to distinguish them from the royal warships that were also part of the fleet. At their peak, the Dunkirkers operated about a hundred warships. The crews were mostly made up of Flemish and Walloon sailors, Spaniards and many individuals from the northern Netherlands and other nearby European countries. Apart from targeting trade and fishing, the royal squadron was often used to convoy troops between Spain and the Spanish Netherlands.

== History ==
Despite a near constant blockade of the Dunkirkers' ports by Dutch warships, the privateers routinely managed to evade the blockaders and inflict much damage to Dutch shipping. Though the Dutch at times prevented the Dunkirkers from reaching open sea, during the winter months the blockade was extremely difficult to maintain and permitted virtually free passage. Sometimes naval battles ensued when privateers tried to break out or when Dutch warships tried to destroy the privateers in their harbours. During one of these Dutch attacks, the Dutch folk hero Piet Pieterszoon Hein, famous for capturing a Spanish treasure fleet, was killed. The Dutch declared the Dunkirk privateers pirates in 1587; captains of Dutch naval vessels had to swear an oath that they would throw or beat all prisoners from Dunkirk warships into the sea (euphemistically known as voetenspoelen, "washing the feet"). Due to its excessive harshness and the fact that it provoked equally cruel retributions from the side of the privateers, this standing order was very unpopular with Dutch crews and the general public. The order was often evaded by putting Dunkirk seamen off on one of the many shallow shoals off the Flemish coast from which they could wade to dry land.

The Dunkirkers had an extremely wide range for their era. Although mainly operating in and around the Channel, they also sailed near the Danish and German coastal areas to intercept Dutch ships returning from the Baltic, and operated in Spanish and Mediterranean waters. Renowned commanders like Michel Jacobsen also had taken part in actions against the Ottoman Empire. They cooperated closely with the Spanish navy, for instance, in the Battle of the Downs. This combined effort reached a peak of effectiveness during the time the Eighty Years' War merged with the Thirty Years' War. To evade the Dutch navy the Dunkirk admiralty had a special type of small and very maneuverable warship constructed, the frigate. Frigate-like ship types were soon adopted by other navies and still have their modern-day counterparts.

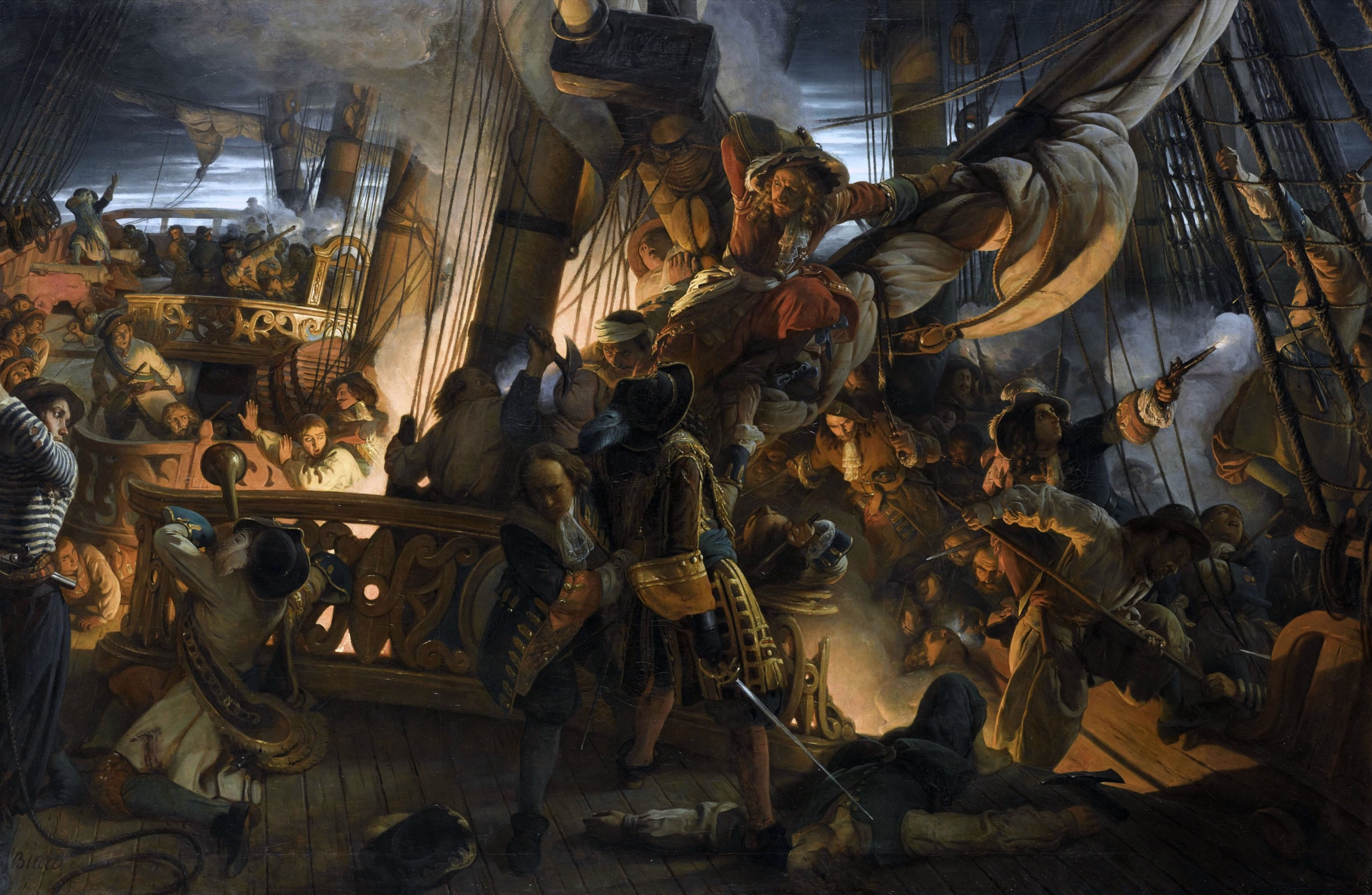
Jean Bart boards a Dutch vessel at the Battle of Texel

In 1600 the Dutch sent an army to conquer the city of Dunkirk and stop the privateering once and for all. The Dutch invasion force clashed with a Spanish army and although the Dutch won the resulting Battle of Nieuwpoort the Dutch commander, stadtholder Maurits of Nassau, realised his lines were dangerously over-stretched and so turned back to the Republic. The Flemish Fleet continued to be especially damaging to the herring fisheries of Holland and Zeeland, almost completely wiping out the sector on several occasions. However, Dutch merchantmen proved far more valuable targets, sometimes vessels on their way back from Russia or as far as the Indies were captured, along with their valuable cargoes.

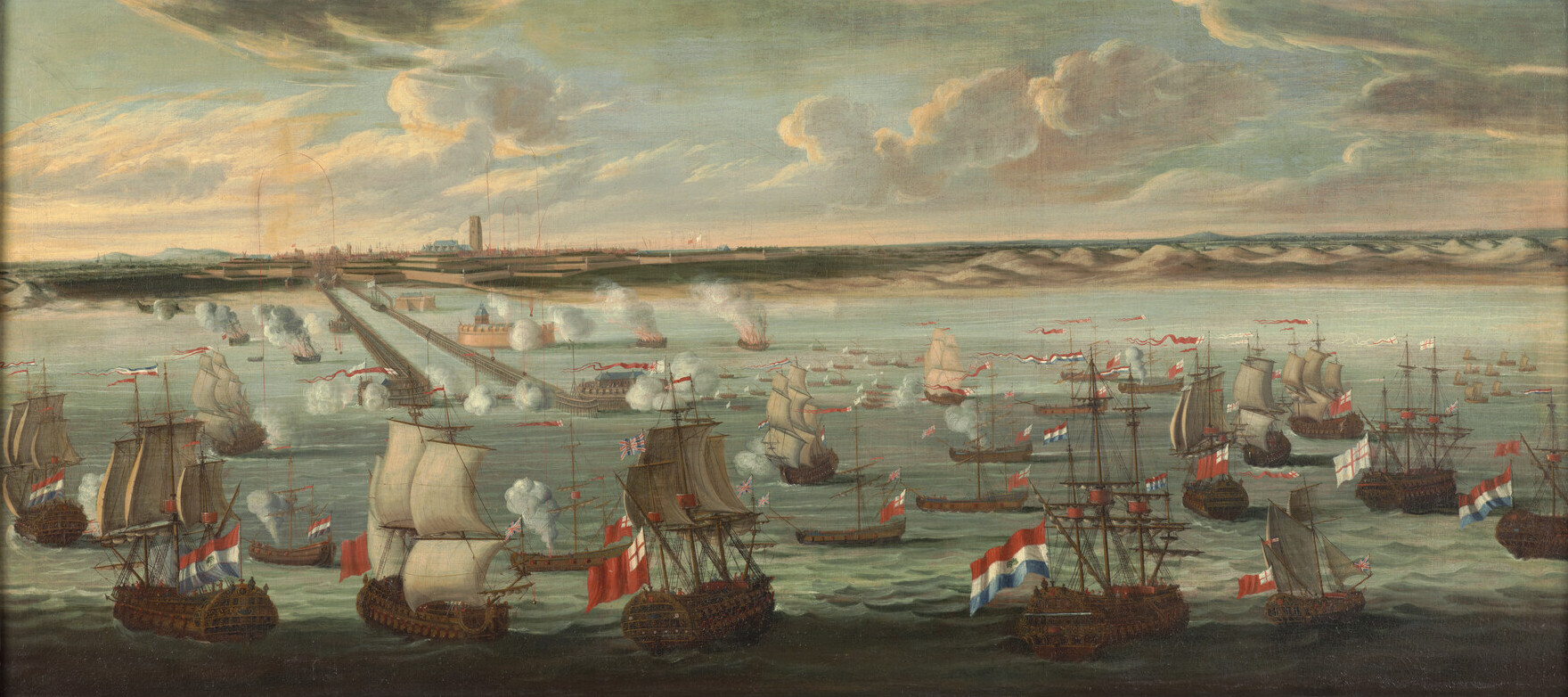
The Bombardment of Dunkirk by a combined Anglo-Dutch fleet, 1695

After 1621, when the Twelve Years' Truce ended, the Dunkirkers captured on average 229 merchantmen and fishing vessels per year from the Dutch. By 1628, they had also seized 522 English vessels, primarily fishing boats but also ships carrying munitions and victuals to the Dutch. This was one of the major concerns of Charles I's diplomatic representative in Brussels, Sir Balthazar Gerbier, who eventually managed to have tobacco taken off the list of 'victuals'. One of the most successful raiders of this period was Jacob Collaert. It was not until October 1646, when the French captured Dunkirk with Dutch naval support, that the danger from the privateers was greatly reduced. In 1652, Spanish forces recaptured the city and the Dunkirkers once again became a major threat. The Dunkirkers preyed on English trade after England resumed hostilities against Spain in 1657, before Dunkirk was captured by a Franco-English force in 1658. However, they continued to operate and Ostend became their most important port. When, after 1672, France and the Dutch Republic became enemies, privateering activities were resumed at Dunkirk, this time for France, and this would last intermittently until 1712. A famous Dunkirk privateer from this period was Jean Bart.

== See also ==
- Geuzen
- Guarda costa
