= Heerman Witmont =

Dutch Golden Age painter

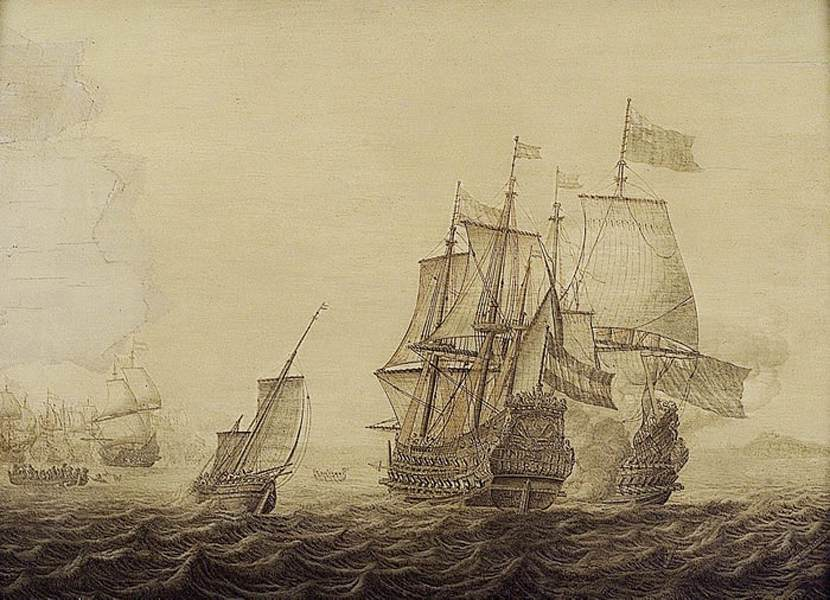
Action between Dutch and English Ships

Heerman Witmont (1605 – 1684), was a Dutch Golden Age painter.

== Biography ==
He was born in Delft. According to the RKD he became a member of the Delft Guild of St. Luke in 1644. He is known for detailed "pen paintings" of ships, a grisaille art form whereby the 17th century painter used a pen and gray paint to create a work on a panel prepared with white oil paint. He died in Delft.
