= Jacob Collaert =

Flemish admiral

Jacob Collaart
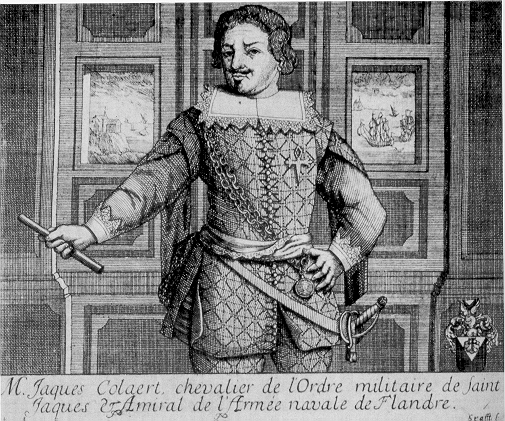
- Died: 1637
- Piratical career
- Nickname: Colaert of Duinkerken
- Type: Dunkirker
- Allegiance: Habsburg
- Rank: Admiral
- Base of operations: Dunkirk
- Battles: Eighty Years' War

Jacob Collaart or Collaert (floruit c. 1625–1637) was a Flemish admiral who served as a privateer and one of the Dunkirkers in Spanish Habsburg service during the Dutch Revolt.

He was responsible for the capture or destruction of at least 150 fishing vessels, bringing 945 captured sailors back to his base in Dunkirk for ransom. A leading admiral over the next decade, he would have later encounters with other Dutch corsairs of the period including Captain Claes Compaan who escaped from him after sighting the corsair off the Spanish coast.

== Biography ==
From 1633 until 1637, Collaart served as Vice Admiral with the Royal Squadron operating out of Dunkirk and, in 1635, his attacks against Dutch herring redders would cost the city of Flushing (Vlissingen) over two million guilders in income.

Although the city of Dunkirk was under a Dutch blockade during early 1635, the blockade was temporarily weakened as several warships under Lieutenant-Admiral Philips van Dorp were supporting French naval forces in the Gulf of Biscay and, on 14 August, Collaert sailing out of Dunkirk successfully broke through the Dutch blockade with a fleet of twenty-one vessels.

Within three days, Collaart's fleet located a herring fleet numbering 160 under the guard of a single man-of-war, armed with 39 guns and an 85-men crew. Easily disabling the escort, 74 vessels were either sunk or set afire with the surviving vessels escaping to the Vlie.

On 19 August, after chasing off the six men-of-war escorts, Collaart's forces destroyed around 50 herring boats near Dogger Bank. Of the surviving fishermen, 150 sailors including wounded as well as the young and the elderly were put on a merchant vessel from Hamburg and returned to the Dutch Republic while the remaining 775 were held captive for ransom.

After this latest attack, a Dutch fleet was soon raised by the States General of the Netherlands who ordered all available vessels to set out after the Collaart's fleet. Sailing from Rotterdam, its commander Willem Codde van der Burch was ordered to rendez-vous at the Texel with Philips van Dorp, recently returning from La Rochelle, and Vice Admiral Quast.

Collaart soon encountered the Dutch fleet of Van der Burch and Van Dorp, consisting of a combined twenty warships, and managed to damage four before the arrival of Quast's fleet forced Collaart to abandon the fight. In part due to bad weather, Collaart was able to escape to Dunkirk, arriving with 975 captive fishermen on 8 September 1635.

The following year, while sailing with two other privateers, Collaart and Mathieu Romboutsen were captured (the third captain managing to escape to an English port) near Dieppe after a five-hour battle against Captain Johan Evertsen on 29 February 1636.

Collaart died of an illness at A Coruña in August 1637. He had a son who was also a privateer, Jacques Collaert the Younger, and was the father-in-law of the later English Vice-Admiral Edward Spragge.
