= Russian landing ship Orsk =

Russian Navy landing ship

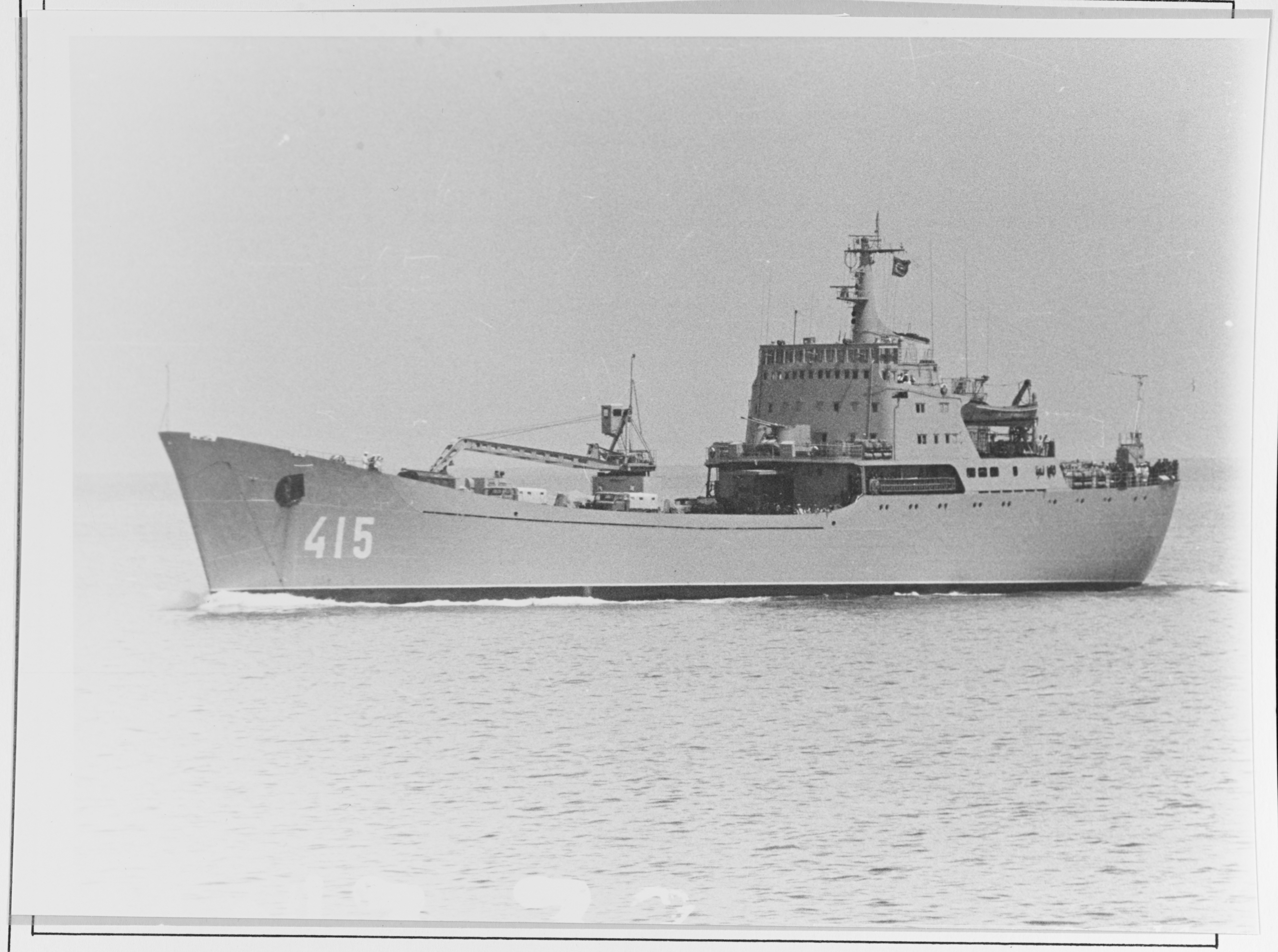

History

Russia
- Name: BDK-69 (1968-2002); Orsk (2002-present)
- Namesake: Orsk
- Builder: Yantar Shipyard, Kaliningrad
- Yard number: 296
- Laid down: 30 August 1967
- Launched: 29 February 1968
- Commissioned: 31 December 1968
- Home port: Sevastopol
- Identification: Hull number: 515 (1968); 421 (1968-1971); 438 (1971); 415 (1971); 411 (1971-1974); 424 (1974); 405 (1974); 412 (1974-1976); 400 (1976-1977); 413 (1977-1978); 410 (1978-1980); 142 (1980-1982); 141 (1982-1988); 144 (1988); 146 (1988); 150 (1988-1997); 148(1997-present)
- Status: In service

General characteristics
- Class & type: Tapir-class landing ship
- Displacement: 3,400 tons standard; 4,360–4,700 tons full load
- Length: 112.8–113.1 m (370 ft 1 in – 371 ft 1 in)
- Beam: 15.3–15.6 m (50 ft 2 in – 51 ft 2 in)
- Draft: 4.5 m (14 ft 9 in)
- Installed power: 9,000 bhp (6,700 kW)
- Propulsion: 2 diesels, 2 shafts
- Speed: 16–18 knots (30–33 km/h)
- Capacity: 1,000 tons
- Troops: 300–425 troops and 20 tanks, or 40 AFVs, or 1,000 tons
- Crew: 55
- Armament: Missiles: 1 × 122 mm naval Grad bombardment rocket launcher in some, 3 × SA-N-5 SAM positions in some.; Guns: 1 dual 57 mm/70 cal DP, 2 dual 25 mm AA in some.; 2 × 7 55 mm MRG-1 Ogonyok multi-barrel rocket grenade launchers (RG-55 grenades)

Orsk (Russian: Орск) is a Tapir-class landing ship of the Russian Navy and part of the Black Sea Fleet.

Named after the city of Orsk, the ship was built in Kaliningrad as BDK-69 (Russian: БДК-69) for Russian: Большой десантный корабль, romanized: Bolshoy desantnyi korabl', lit. 'large landing ship', before being renamed Orsk in 2002. She is one of the Tapir class designated Project 1171/II by the Russian Navy, with the NATO reporting name Alligator.

== Construction and commissioning ==
Orsk was built by Yantar Shipyard in Kaliningrad, being laid down on 30 August 1967 and launched on 29 February 1968 as BDK-69. She was commissioned into the Soviet Navy on 31 December 1968 as part of its Black Sea Fleet. She was homeported in Sevastopol, and with the dissolution of the Soviet Union in late December 1991, she went on to serve in the Russian Navy.

== Career ==
BDK-69 was deployed on eleven combat missions during her Soviet surface, also taking part in the naval exercises Okean-70, Yug-71, Krym-79, Zapad-81, and Shchit-83. She was often deployed into the Mediterranean as part of the responses to military conflicts in the Middle East, transporting peacekeepers during the Yugoslav Wars, and delivering humanitarian supplies to Guinea, Syria, and Bulgaria. In the 1990s she evacuated people during the War in Abkhazia. In August 2000, she made four voyages with other Black Sea Fleet ships from Gonio, Georgia, to Utrishenok, Russia, carrying equipment of the Russian Transcaucasus Group of Forces. On 20 October 2002 she was renamed Orsk.

Orsk has undergone several refits during her career, at the Tuapse plant in 2004, and the 13th Ship Repair Plant in Sevastopol in 2009. On 8 August 2014, she started another refit at the 13th Ship Repair Plant, beginning trials on 27 October 2017 prior to rejoining the fleet. She was commissioned back into service in December 2017. In April 2018, she entered the Mediterranean, headed for the naval facility at Tartus, Syria, carrying BTR-80 armoured personnel carriers, KamAZ trucks, a Ural fuel tanker, and a Tigr armoured vehicle. On 13 March 2019, she carried out gunnery exercises in the Black Sea. In September that year she and more than ten other fleet vessels carried out exercises. She returned to Syria in late 2019, but suffered a breakdown of one of her two diesel engines, returning to the Black Sea under tow of the ocean tug MB-304 in January 2020. In April 2020 Orsk's crew rescued a fisherman whose boat had capsized off Sevastopol.

Orsk was one of the Black Sea Fleet's landing forces used to support the Russian invasion of Ukraine from February 2022. The Port of Berdiansk was captured, and on 21 March, Russian media Zvezda reported on the arrival of amphibious transports in Berdiansk. Orsk was the first Russian warship to enter the port, delivering armoured personnel carriers. At 7:45 on 24 March the port was struck by what Ukrainian officials claimed was a OTR-21 Tochka tactical ballistic missile. A Tapir-class ship, initially thought to be Orsk, was seen to catch fire and suffer a large explosion. It was later confirmed that the ship hit was not Orsk, but her sister ship Saratov.
