= Kunikov =

Kunikov (Russian: Куников) is a Russian male surname, its feminine counterpart is Kunikova. Notable people with the surname include:

- Tsezar Kunikov (1909–1943), Soviet naval officer
  - 2280 Kunikov, a minor planet named after him
  - Russian ship Tsezar Kunikov, a landing ship named after him
