= Russian landing ship Nikolai Filchenkov =

Russian Navy landing ship

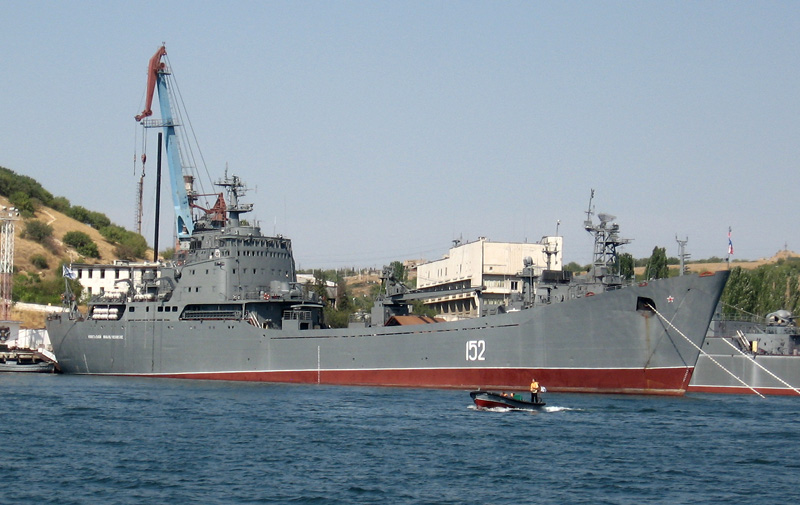

History

Russia
- Name: Nikolai Filchenkov
- Namesake: Nikolai Filchenkov
- Builder: Yantar Shipyard, Kaliningrad
- Yard number: 304
- Laid down: 30 January 1974
- Launched: 29 March 1975
- Commissioned: 30 December 1975
- Home port: Sevastopol
- Identification: Hull number: 560 (1975-1976); 409 (1976-1980); 417 (1980); 141 (1980-1982); 136 (1982-1985); 143 (1985); 146 (1985-1988); 142 (1988-1991); 152 (1991-present)
- Status: In service

General characteristics
- Class & type: Tapir-class landing ship
- Displacement: 3,400 tons standard; 4,360–4,700 tons full load
- Length: 112.8–113.1 m (370 ft 1 in – 371 ft 1 in)
- Beam: 15.3–15.6 m (50 ft 2 in – 51 ft 2 in)
- Draft: 4.5 m (14 ft 9 in)
- Propulsion: 2 diesels, 2 shafts, 9,000 bhp (6,700 kW)
- Speed: 16–18 knots (30–33 km/h)
- Capacity: 1,000 tons
- Troops: 300–425 troops and 20 tanks, or 40 AFVs, or 1,000 tons
- Crew: 55
- Armament: Missiles: 1 × 122 mm naval Grad bombardment rocket launcher in some, 3 × SA-N-5 SAM positions in some.; Guns: 1 dual 57 mm/70 cal DP, 2 dual 25 mm AA in some.; 2 × 7 55 mm MRG-1 Ogonyok multi-barrel rocket grenade launchers (RG-55 grenades)

Nikolai Filchenkov (Russian: Николай Фильченков) is a Tapir-class landing ship of the Russian Navy and part of the Black Sea Fleet.

Named after commissar Nikolai Filchenkov, a posthumous Hero of the Soviet Union killed in action during the Second World War, the ship was built in Kaliningrad. She is classified as a BDK (Russian: БДК) for Russian: Большой десантный корабль, romanized: Bolshoy desantnyi korabl', lit. 'large landing ship'. She is one of the Tapir class designated Project 1171/IV by the Russian Navy, with the NATO reporting name Alligator.

== Construction and commissioning ==
Nikolai Filchenkov was built by Yantar Shipyard in Kaliningrad, being laid down on 30 January 1974 and launched on 29 March 1975. She was commissioned into the Soviet Navy on 30 December 1975 as part of its Black Sea Fleet. She was named in honour of commissar Nikolai Filchenkov, a posthumous Hero of the Soviet Union killed in action during operations around the Siege of Sevastopol during the Second World War. She was homeported in Sevastopol, and with the dissolution of the Soviet Union in late December 1991, she went on to serve in the Russian Navy.

== Career ==
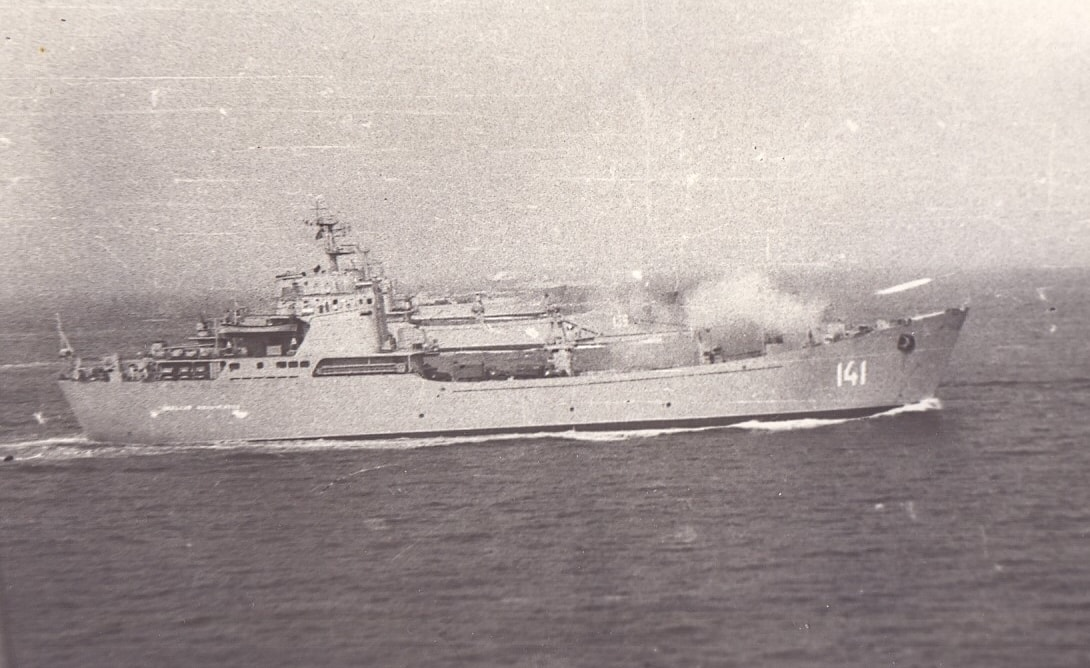
Nikolai Filchenkov underway with other ships of her class in 1981

Nikolai Filchenkov was often deployed into the Mediterranean and further afield during the Soviet period, serving as part of Soviet responses to conflicts in the Middle East. From March to July 1976, and again from November 1977 to January 1978, she visited ports in Angola during the Angolan Civil War. She was rated as excellent eight times in annual reviews between 1975 and 2004, and the best ship in the Black Sea Fleet in her rank in 1996 and 1997. In August 2000, she made four voyages with other Black Sea Fleet ships from Gonio, Georgia, to Utrishenok, Russia, carrying equipment of the Russian Transcaucasus Group of Forces. On 23 March 2005, she entered Ukraine to carry out landing exercises around Feodosia, causing protests from the Ukrainian Foreign Ministry. Russian commanders claimed that the exercises had been agreed with the competent Ukrainian authorities. The ship was again the cause of a diplomatic problems in September 2009, when it was reported that the Nikolai Filchenkov had brought a cargo of cruise missiles to Sevastopol, with the Ukrainian Foreign Ministry announcing checks into the claims.

In December 2012, Nikolai Filchenkov deployed into the Mediterranean as part of the Russian naval group there. She carried out exercises in June 2013 with the destroyer Vice-Admiral Kulakov, which had been detached from the Northern Fleet. Nikolai Filchenkov entered Syrian waters on a visit on 25 September 2013. She began a refit at the 13th Ship Repair Plant in Sevastopol in July 2014, returning to the fleet the following year. In February 2015, complaints about the poor quality of food and other violations resulted in an investigation, which uncovered a number of violations on the ship. In October 2015, she was part of the Syrian Express with a number of other Russian landing ships, conveying supplies to the Russian naval facility in Tartus, Syria, during the Russian intervention in the Syrian civil war. Her sister ship Saratov and the Ropucha-class Yamal also made supply deliveries that month. She made further visits the following year, and again in 2017.

On 24 May 2017, she exercised in the Mediterranean with the landing ships Azov and Tsezar Kunikov, the frigates Admiral Essen and Admiral Grigorovich, and the destroyer Smetlivy. She returned from a deployment with the Russian naval group in the Mediterranean in April 2018, and carried out mine warfare and gunnery exercises in August that year.

According to Ukraine’s Defense Intelligence, the ship was hit in the night of 19 April 2026 in Sevastopol Bay along with Yamal, and both may have been subsequently taken out of service.
