= Battle off the coast of Abkhazia =

Naval engagement during the 2008 South Ossetia War

Coordinates: 42.1500°N 41.6667°E

Naval engagement off the coast of Abkhazia
- Part of Russo-Georgian War
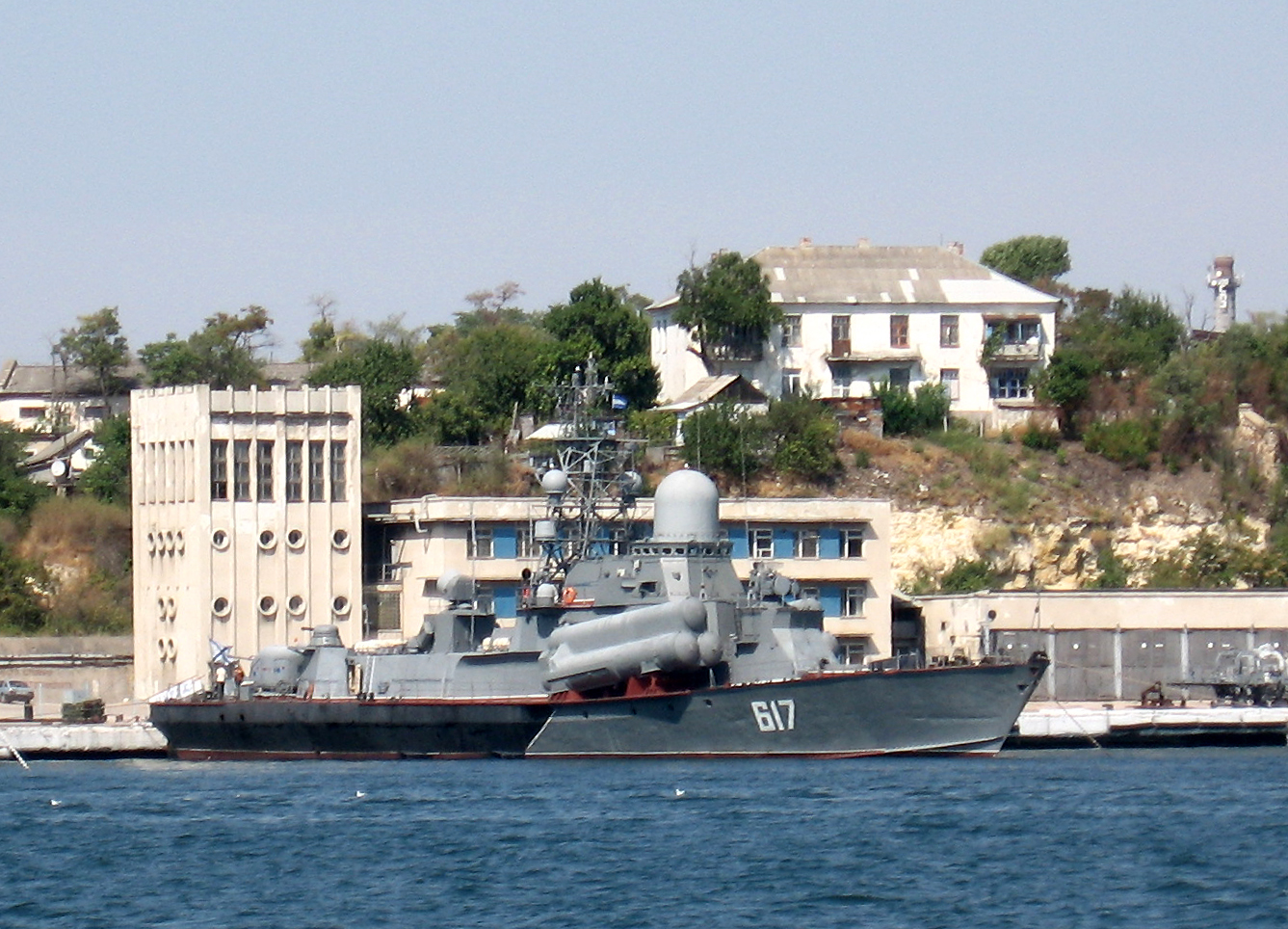
- Russian corvette Mirazh
Date	10 August 2008
Location	Black Sea off Abkhazia, in the vicinity of Ochamchire
Result	Russian victory (disputed)

Belligerents
Russia	Georgia

Units involved
Russian Navy; Black Sea Fleet	Georgian Navy; Coast Guard

Strength
4 Landing ships 1 Cruiser; 1 Destroyer; 5 Corvettes; 2 Minesweepers; 1 Spy ship 1 Ocean tug	4-5 patrol boats One Stenka-class patrol boat: P-21 Giorgi Toreli; One Yaroslavets-class tugboat: Gantiadi; Possibly one Tiger-class fast attack craft: Dioskuria

Casualties and losses
None	1 patrol boat destroyed (Giorgi Toreli); 1 other vessel damaged (Russian claim)

The Battle off the coast of Abkhazia was a supposed naval engagement between warships of the Russian Black Sea Fleet and Georgian patrol boats during the Russo-Georgian War.

== The engagement ==
On 10 August 2008, RIA Novosti – quoting a source in the Russian Navy headquarters – reported that Russian warships had appeared at the maritime border with Georgia. According to the source, the vessel Moskva and other ships departed from Sevastopol, would meet three large landing ships from Sevastopol and Novorossiysk already present in the eastern part of the Black Sea. The source claimed that "The purpose of the Black Sea Fleet vessels' presence in this region is to provide aid to refugees". The source dismissed reports of Russian blockade of Georgia's coast, "A blockade of the coastline would mean war with Georgia, and we are not in a state of war with Georgia." Abkhaz officials claimed that Russian ships prevented several Georgian ships on 9 August from coming near the Abkhaz coastline.

A naval confrontation occurred between Russian and Georgian vessels on 10 August. According to the Russian Ministry of Defence, the Russian fleet sank one Georgian ship after four Georgian missile boats had attacked the Russian Navy ships near the Abkhaz coast. The remaining three Georgian vessels were forced to withdraw towards Poti. A ministry spokesman told ITAR-Tass that there were two attempts of attacks by Georgian boats. Earlier, the Russian navy stated that Russian ships arrived in Novorossiysk, not in the territorial waters of Georgia.

According to a sailor interviewed in Sevastopol on 13 August, a Georgian vessel was struck and sunk on 10 August in 300 m of water by P-120 Malakhit (SS-N-9 'Siren') missile, fired allegedly by the guided missile corvette MRK Mirazh. Furthermore, the sailor claimed that a second Georgian ship also suffered during the battle. He said that the destroyed vessel was the missile boat Tbilisi. Russian media also reported that the sunk Georgian vessel was Tbilisi. However, this was disproven as both the Tbilisi and Dioskuria, the only two missile boats of the Georgian Navy, were mined and scuttled by Russian troops in the port of Poti, several days after the incident. It was suggested that the destroyed vessel was the P-21 patrol boat Giorgi Toreli. However, Giorgi Toreli was still in service by 2014.

== Russian Navy operations ==
According to Georgian source, the Russian navy that advanced toward Georgia, comprised the following vessels:

- Ropucha-class landing ships Tsezar Kunikov and Yamal.
- Alligator-class landing ship Saratov.
- Albatros-class Anti-Submarine Corvettes Kalimov, Povarino and Suzdalets.
- Moma Class Surveillance ship Ekvator.
- Natya-class minesweepers Zhukov and Turbinist.
- Nanuchka-class corvette Mirazh.
- Bora-class guided missile hovercraft Samum (Breeze)
- Small Landing Ship Koida
- Sorum Class Fleet Tug MB-31.
- Kashin-class destroyer Smetlivy
- Slava-class cruiser Moskva.

According to PONARS Eurasia, 13 Russian warships were headed towards the Georgian seacoast. These ships were the Slava-class cruiser Moskva, the Kashin-class destroyer Smetlivyi, several Grisha-class corvettes (Suzdalets, Aleksandrovsk, Muromets, and possibly Kasimov), the Nanuchka-class missile ship Mirazh, two patrol ships, three amphibious landing ships (two Ropucha-class, Tsesar Kunikov and Yamal, and one Alligator-class, Saratov), two mine warfare ships (Admiral Zhelezniakov and Turbinist), the transport ship General Riabikov, and the tugboat Epron. The Russian patrol ship Mirazh was probably responsible for the sinking of the Georgian boat.

While the full-scale hostilities between Russia and Georgia commenced on 8 August, the Black Sea Fleet reportedly reached the Georgian coast on 9 August. While the distance between Sevastopol and Ochamchire is about 400 nautical miles, the Russian convoy (including Moskva, Smetlivy, Muromets, and Aleksandrovets) departed the base with a company of crafts with a top speed of 12-16 knots. It was suggested that it could have taken the ships at least 25 hours to reach Georgia, which suggested the ships had to have departed from Sevastopol as soon as the hostilities began. Some analysts even suggested that the Black Sea Fleet, for which this was first activity since 1945, had probably departed from Sevastopol before full-scale hostilities between Russia and Georgia began.

The Georgian coast was blockaded by vessels of the Russian Black Sea Fleet on 10 August. According to Interfax news agency citing Russian navy source, the blockading units "were assigned the task to not allow arms and military hardware supplies to reach Georgia by sea." Ukraine threatened on 10 August that it could not allow the return of the Russian Black Sea Fleet to the base in Ukraine.

Georgia has not admitted to the sea battle, in which Georgian ship was sunk, having ever taken place. The Black Sea Fleet, according to the Georgian Foreign Ministry statement, landed 4,000 troops in Ochamchire. It then went on to attack Georgian troops deployed in Kodori Gorge. According to the Georgian source, a missile was launched against an inland target in Kodori.

== Aftermath ==
Ukraine stated on August 10 that it could prohibit Russian warships to return to their base in the Ukrainian city of Sevastopol. Deputies of Sevastopol City Council announced that the city residents were ready to resist the attempts of the Ukrainian forces to deter the Russian re-entry. Former Commander of the Russian Black Sea Fleet Eduard Baltin declared that although Ukraine had technical capability not to allow the entry of Russian ships into Sevastopol, this could lead to an armed confrontation. Ukrainian authorities declared on 11 August 2008 that they were willing to discuss the readmittance of ships of the Russian Black Sea Fleet to Crimea. President of Ukraine Viktor Yushchenko and Ministry of Foreign Affairs (Ukraine) decided to regulate the deployment of the Russian Black Sea fleet in Ukraine's territorial waters. Although this decision did not help Georgia much in the war, this sent a signal to the West that the Russian Fleet could create security issues and the US Secretary of State Condoleezza Rice supported Ukraine's decision. Deputy Chief of General Staff of the Armed Forces of the Russian Federation Anatoliy Nogovitsyn declared on 14 August 2008 that the Ukrainian orders were not legitimate for the Russian fleet and the Russian fleet had only one supreme commander - the President of Russia.

On 13 August 2008, it was reported that part of the Russian fleet returned to Sevastopol for refueling. On 16 August 2008, Ukrainian media reported that ships of the Russian fleet could not return to Sevastopol because they had sustained damage. Assistant Commander of the Russian Navy Igor Dygalo rejected the reports that the Russian fleet had sustained damage and there were losses among the servicemen. Cruiser Moskva returned to Sevastopol on 23 August 2008 and was welcomed by pro-Russian activists in the port. In December 2009, it was reported that Russian cruiser Moskva needed repair mostly due to the damages caused by 2008 war.

The commanding officer of the corvette Mirazh, Captain Ivan Dubik, was received in Moscow by Russian president Dmitry Medvedev, who awarded him a military medal, along with other members of the Russian armed forces on 14 August 2008.

Ukrainian naval officer and journalist Miroslav Mamchak stated in September 2008 that the Russian fleet had lost 8 sailors near the Georgian coast.

In October 2008, Nezavisimaya Gazeta reported that while two Malakhit rockets had been fired, one of the rockets most likely missed the Georgian ships and both rockets were flying freely. One of the rockets flew past Lotos-1 cargo vessel bearing Moldovan flag, while the second exploded 50-100m from the cargo ship and its fragments dealt a minimal damage to the Moldovan ship. Ukrainian source published in 2017 stated that the Russian Mirazh had indeed attacked motor vessel near the Georgian coast in August 2008, which actually was Lotos-1 bearing Moldovan flag. The P-120 missile missed the target by about 100 m and exploded in the air, some of the missile debris fell onto the deck of Lotos-1.
