= Tapir-class landing ship =

Class of Soviet/Russian/Ukrainian landing ships

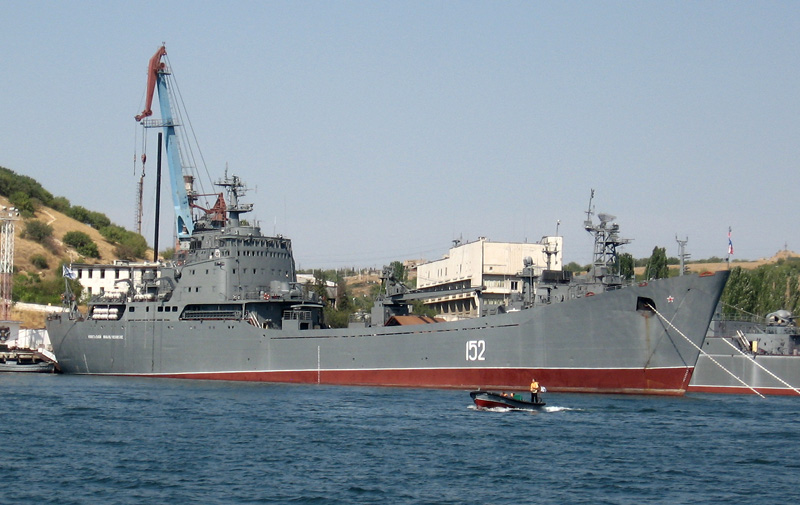
- Nikolai Filchenkov in Sevastopol, 2007

Class overview
- Operators: Soviet Navy; Russian Navy; Ukrainian Navy
- Succeeded by: Ivan Gren class
- Built: 1964–1975
- In commission: 1965–present
- Planned: 15
- Completed: 14
- Canceled: 1
- Active: 3
- Laid up: 1
- Lost: 1
- Retired: 10

General characteristics
- Type: Landing ship, tank
- Displacement: 3,400 tons standard; 4,360–4,700 tons full load
- Length: 112.8–113.1 m (370 ft 1 in – 371 ft 1 in)
- Beam: 15.3–15.6 m (50 ft 2 in – 51 ft 2 in)
- Draft: 4.5 m (14 ft 9 in)
- Propulsion: 2 diesels, 2 shafts, 9,000 bhp (6,700 kW)
- Speed: 16–18 knots (30–33 km/h)
- Capacity: 1,000 tons
- Troops: 300–425 troops and 20 tanks, or 40 AFVs, or 1,000 tons
- Crew: 55
- Armament: Missiles: 1 × 122 mm naval Grad bombardment rocket launcher in some, 3 × SA-N-5 SAM positions in some.; Guns: 1 dual 57 mm/70 cal DP, 2 dual 25 mm AA in some.

The Tapir-class landing ship, Soviet designation Project 1171 landing ship (NATO reporting name: Alligator), is a class of Soviet/Russian general purpose, beachable amphibious warfare ships (Soviet classification: large landing ship; Russian: большой десантный корабль, БДК).

== History ==
In Soviet post–World War II analysis of amphibious operations, the recommendation was made that the Soviet Navy should start building dedicated amphibious ships. Among the first ships, launching in 1967, was the Polnocny class of medium landing ships, whose 900-ton vessels could transport six tanks and 180 troops.

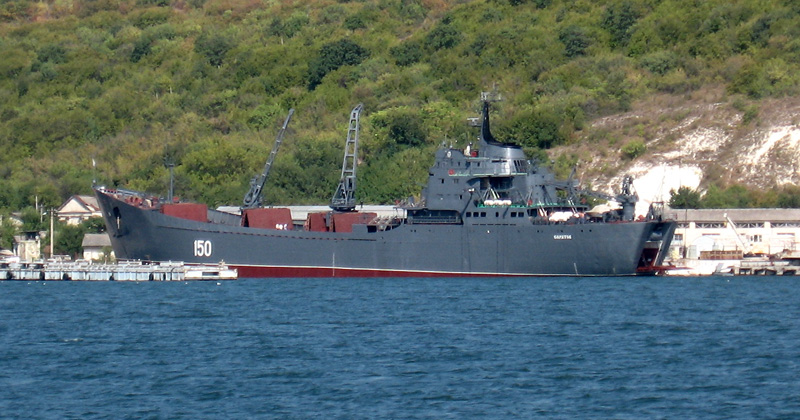
Saratov at Sevastopol, 2007

A newer type of amphibious warship had preceded it in the late 1950s, a true Landing Ship, Tank (LST) that was named Project 1171 and also designated Tapir. Labelled "Large Landing Ship", her displacement was 4,360 tons full load and could transport up to 313 troops and 20 tanks. Additional vehicles could be stored on the upper deck. NATO gave these ships the code name "Alligator", and several subtypes were created.

The design of Project 1171 was initiated in 1959 by the Navy, while a similar dual-purpose Project 1173 was ordered by the Ministry of the Maritime Fleet. Eventually both designs were merged under the Project 1171 umbrella, and the resulting vessel was a compromise between military (speed, survivability) and civil (fuel economy) objectives. The design team produced four different configurations; the Navy selected the most powerful and fastest option, which was also the least fuel-efficient, while the Ministry of the Maritime Fleet withdrew from the project completely. All production ships were made for the Navy and never operated on shipping lines.

A total of 14 vessels were completed between 1964 and 1975; all were retired between 1992 and 1995. As of September 2008, two vessels, currently named Orsk and Saratov, were in active service with the 197th Brigade of Landing Ships in the Russian Black Sea Fleet. As of March 2014, Saratov and Nikolai Filchenkov were in service with the 197th Brigade of Landing Ships in the Black Sea Fleet, Nikolay Vilkov was in service with the 100th Brigade of Landing Ships in the Russian Pacific Fleet, and Orsk was inactive and undergoing refits.

Saratov (BDK-65) was launched in July 1964, commissioned in 1966 as Voronezhsky Komsomolets. As a lead ship of a formation, she lacked the habitable troop compartments installed on other ships of the class. Saratov was stationed in Donuzlav (Black Sea Fleet) until the dissolution of the Soviet Union and then remained mothballed in Odesa until 1994. The ship was reported in active operations in 2000 and later.

From 2013 on, Nikolai Filchenkov and Saratov were used to transport military equipment from Novorossiysk to Tartus in Syria, during the Russian military intervention in the Syrian civil war, along with Ropucha-class ships.

Orsk (BDK-69) was launched and commissioned in 1968 as Nikolay Obekov. She served a total of 11 campaigns in the Indian and Atlantic oceans and the Mediterranean. Later, under the Russian flag, she carried troops and materials to Yugoslavia, Adjara, and Abkhazia. In 2018, the vessel was seen transporting Russian equipment to Syria. On 21 March 2022, she appeared in Russian TV reports unloading military equipment in the Russian-occupied Ukrainian port of Berdiansk, which led to initial confusion when her sister ship Saratov was destroyed three days later at the same place.

During the Russian invasion of Ukraine, in the aftermath of the Battle of Berdiansk, Saratov was reported as destroyed by a Ukrainian attack on 24 March 2022 while in the port of Berdiansk. Video showed a large fire, smoke, and explosions, with one explosion engulfing the bow of the ship. The ship was originally reported as having been Orsk, but the General Staff of the Ukrainian Armed Forces later reported that Saratov had been destroyed, and two Ropucha-class ships, Tsezar Kunikov and Novocherkassk damaged. Russian sources confirmed a missile attack on Berdiansk harbour (without clarification of missile type), which damaged two landing ships—Saratov and unnamed one, as well as sinking Saratov. On 2 July 2022, Russian official in southern Ukraine Vladimir Rogov confirmed a Tochka-U ballistic missile was used back on 24 March to target the Port of Berdiansk and that Saratov was scuttled by her crew in order "to prevent detonation of the on-board munitions by the fire that had started". There are no Russian reports publicly available as to the extent of damage to the ship, but Russian sources state she was salvaged and was to be towed to Kerch, Crimea.

== Ships of class ==
Name	Type	In service	Status
Saratov (BDK-65)	1171	18 August 1966	Sunk or scuttled on 24 March 2022 in the Port of Berdiansk after sustaining missile damage during operations against Ukraine.
Krymsky Komsomolets (BDK-6)	1171	30 December 1966	Decommissioned on 19 March 1992, scrapped in 1995
Tomsky Komsomolets (BDK-13)	1171	30 September 1967	Decommissioned on 5 July 1994
Komsomolets Karelii (BDK-62)	1171	29 December 1967	Decommissioned on 1 December 1997
Sergey Lazo (BDK-66)	1171/II	27 September 1968	Decommissioned on 5 July 1994
Orsk (BDK-69)	1171/II	31 December 1968	In service
50 Let Shefstva VLKSM (BDK-77)	1171/III	30 September 1969	Decommissioned on 5 July 1994
Donetsky Shakhtyor	1171/III	31 December 1969	Decommissioned on 10 April 2002
Krasnaya Presnya (BDK-100)	1171/III	30 September 1970	Decommissioned on 30 June 1993, sold to commercial service, sunk in a storm on her way to be scrapped in 1995
Ilya Azarov (BDK-104)	1171/III	10 June 1971	Acquired by Ukraine on 10 January 1996 as Rivne (U762). Decommissioned and used as a civilian freighter in 2004 before being scrapped in 2007.
Aleksandr Tortsev	1171/III	31 December 1971	Decommissioned on 5 July 1994
Pyotr Ilyichyov	1171/III	29 December 1972	Decommissioned on 30 June 1993
Nikolai Vilkov	1171/IV	30 July 1974	Active as of 2026
Nikolai Filchenkov	1171/IV	30 December 1975	In service; may have been damaged in drone attack in April 2026
Nikolai Golubkov	1171/IV	-	Never completed

== See also ==
- List of active Russian Navy ships
- List of ships of the Soviet Navy
- List of ships of Russia by project number
