= Berdiansk port attack =

2022 missile strike during the Russian invasion of Ukraine

- Part of the Russian invasion of Ukraine
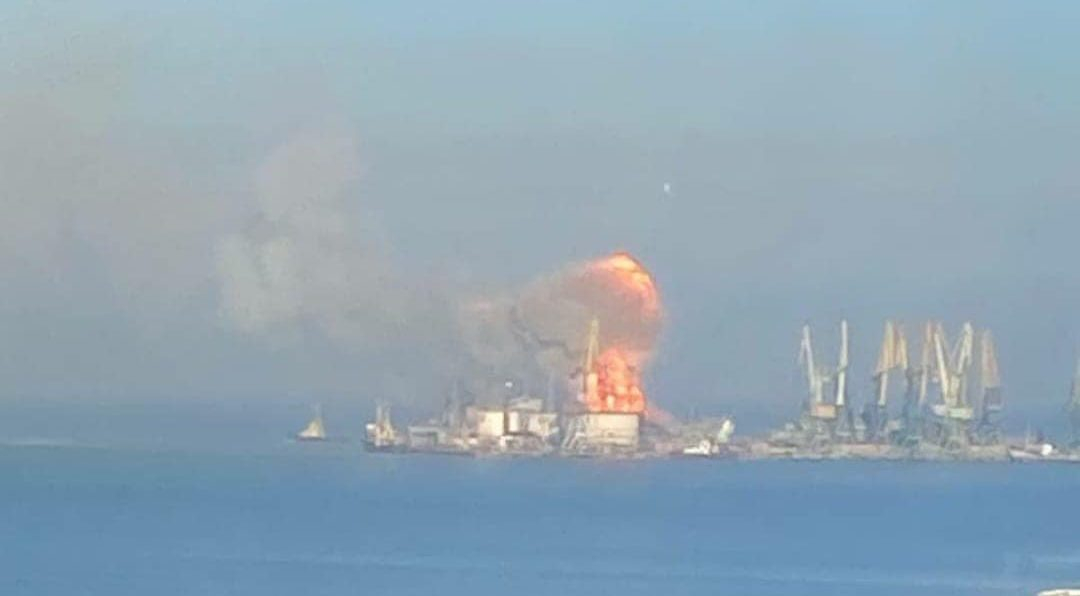
- The Alligator-class landing ship Saratov on fire, with the Ropucha-class landing ships Caesar Kunikov and Novocherkassk steaming out of port after the attack
Date	24 March 2022
Location	Berdiansk, Zaporizhzhia Oblast, Ukraine 46.7506°N 36.7792°E

Belligerents
Russia	Ukraine

Units involved
Russian Navy	Ukrainian Ground Forces: 19th ORBr

Casualties and losses
Sunk; Saratov; Damaged; Tsezar Kunikov; Novocherkassk At least 11 crew members killed (unconfirmed)	None

The Berdiansk port attack was a strike carried out by Ukrainian forces against Russian Navy ships moored in the Port of Berdiansk on 24 March 2022, during the Russian invasion of Ukraine. The Alligator-class landing ship Saratov was sunk, and one of the two Ropucha-class landing ships took damage but was able to leave the port.

At the time, it was the heaviest naval loss suffered by Russia during the invasion, and one of Ukraine's most significant successes.

== Background ==
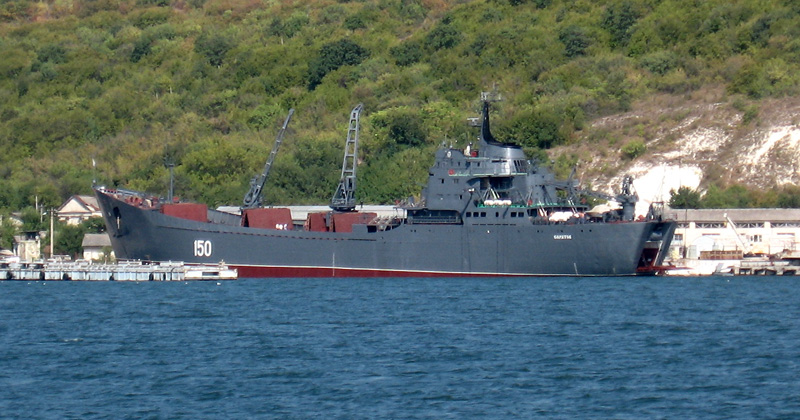
Saratov in Sevastopol, 2007

On 26 February 2022, Russian troops captured the Port of Berdiansk and the Berdiansk Airport. By the following day, the Russian military had taken full control of the city.

Beginning on 14 March, the port was used as a logistics hub by the Russians to support their offensive in southern Ukraine and in particular the siege of Mariupol. On 21 March, Russian media Zvezda reported on the arrival of amphibious transports in Berdiansk. A Russian navy officer described it as "a landmark event that will open logistical possibilities to the Black Sea Navy".

== Attack ==
The attack occurred at 7:45 on 24 March. Fire onboard the Alligator-class landing ship Saratov caused a large explosion, as the vessel was apparently laden with ammunition. Russia reported that the ship had sunk following a fire and explosions, but did not mention the Ukrainian attack. The explosion caused damage to two nearby Ropucha-class landing ships, the Tsezar Kunikov, and the Novocherkassk. Both of these ships escaped the port while fighting their own fires, and later returned to Crimea. Other damage included large oil tanks on the pier and a nearby merchant ship that had been moored there since before the invasion, both of which were still burning the next day.

Ukrainian officials claimed that the attack was carried out with a OTR-21 Tochka tactical ballistic missile.

== Aftermath ==
Satellite imagery later confirmed the Saratov had sunk in the harbour, with its superstructure visible above the surface. Unconfirmed reports suggested that eight crewmen were killed on the Tsezar Kunikov and three on the Novocherkassk, but losses on the Saratov were not reported.

British intelligence assessed that the sinking of the Saratov would damage the Russian Navy's confidence to operate close to the Ukrainian coastline. As of 31 March, no further attempts to resupply with amphibious ships had been observed, according to the United States Department of Defense.

At the time, the attack that sank Saratov was not mentioned by Russia. On 2 July Russia announced that the ship had been damaged by a missile strike and scuttled by its crew "to prevent detonation of the on-board munitions", and that it had been salvaged and would be towed to Kerch in Crimea.

Both Novocherkassk and Tsezar Kunikov were later repaired and returned to service. On 26 December 2023 Novocherkassk was sunk and Tsezar Kunikov was destroyed on 14 February 2024.

== See also ==
- Russian occupation of Zaporizhzhia Oblast
