= 19th Missile Brigade =

19th Missile Brigade “Saint Barbara”
- 19-та ракетна бригада «Свята Варвара»
- Active: November 9, 1997 – present
- Country: Ukraine
- Branch: Ukrainian Ground Forces
- Type: Rocket and Artillery Forces
- Role: Artillery
- Garrison/HQ: Khmelnytskyi, Khmelnytskyi Oblast
- Patron: Saint Barbara
- Engagements: Russo-Ukrainian War: Southern Ukraine campaign; Berdiansk port attack
- Website: Official Facebook page

Commanders
- Current commander: Col. Rostyslav Karpush

Insignia
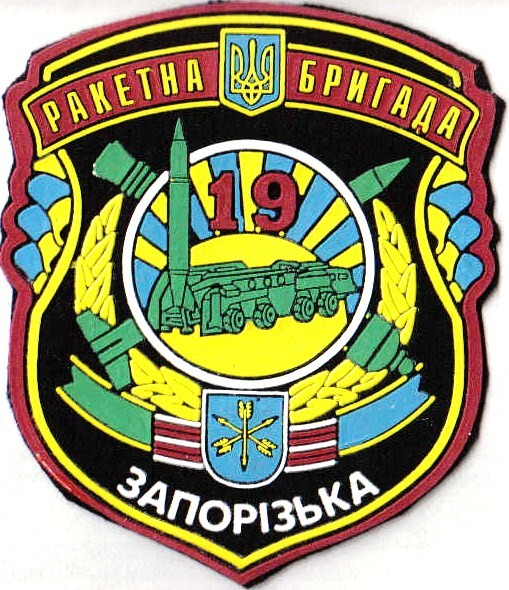
- Former insignia

The 19th Missile Brigade "Saint Barbara" is an artillery brigade of Ukrainian Ground Forces. It specializes in rocket artillery, armed primarily with Tochka-U Tactical ballistic missile systems.

== History ==
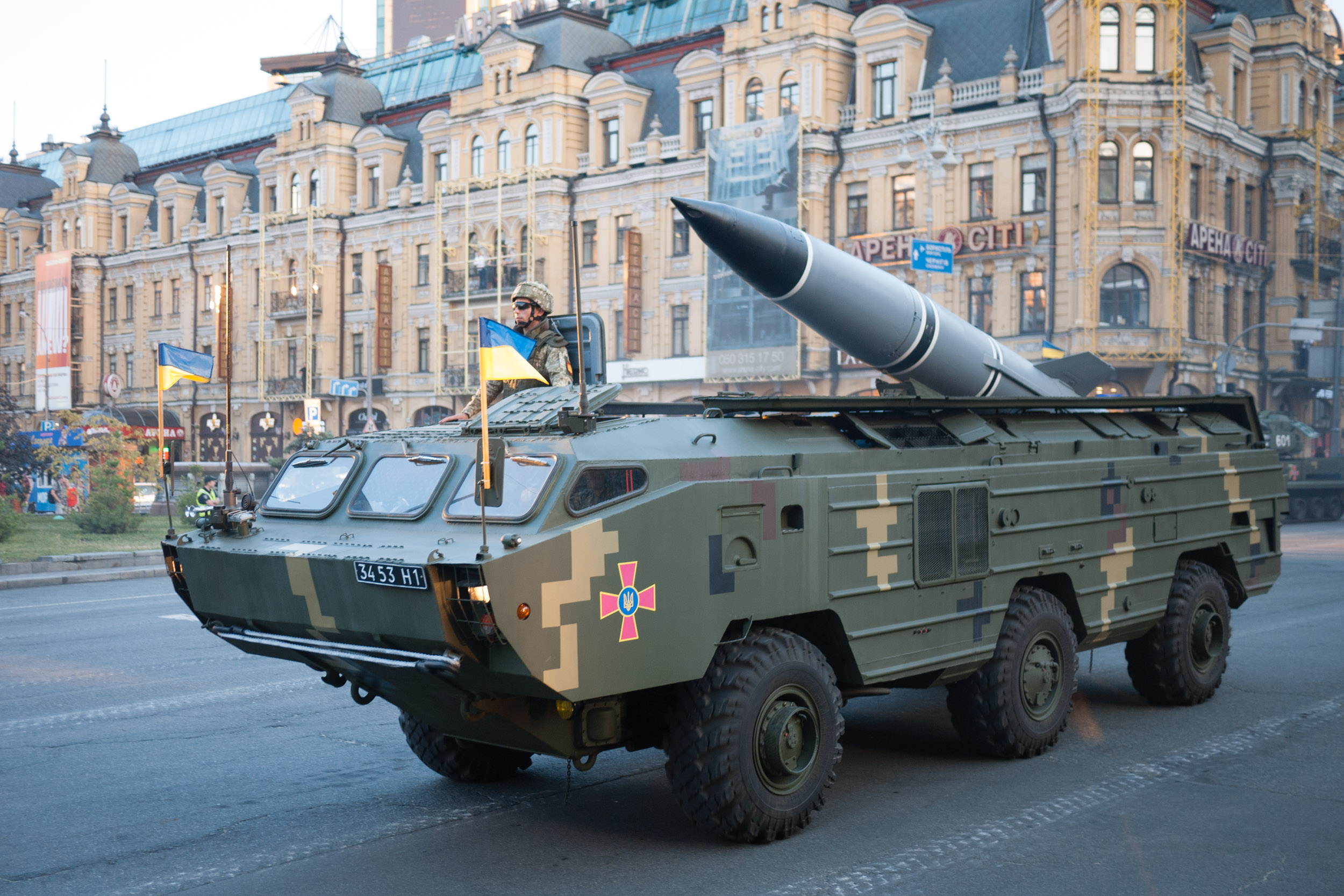
Tochka-U launcher of the 19th Missile Brigade in Kyiv in 2018

The 19th Missile Brigade was formed in October–November 1997, with basis on the USSR's 19th Missile Division.

In an interview, Viktor Muzhenko, the Chief of the General Staff of the Armed Forces of Ukraine, discussed the deployment of "Tochka-U" missile complexes against Russian irregulars and regular army units operating within Ukrainian territory. The first instances of using this system emerged during the intense battles for Savur-Mohyla in August 2014. Over the course of two years of conflict, approximately one hundred missiles from the "Tochka-U" system, equipped with various types of warheads, were launched to achieve a range of military objectives.

Following the large-scale entry of Russian regular forces into Ukraine later that same month, the General Staff faced significant challenges. With enemy targets proving difficult to reach through other means, especially while Ukrainian troops were attempting to break out of an encirclement near Ilovaisk, the General Staff called upon the 1st Rocket Divizion (RDn) of the 19th Brigade and the 1st Separate Artillery Divizion (ReADn) of the 107th Artillery Regiment. These long-range artillery units played a crucial role by establishing what was effectively a “corridor of fire” to cover retreating Ukrainian forces. The strategy involved targeting probable enemy positions, such as elevated terrain, road junctions, and other strategic points, with strikes being coordinated based on real-time communication. Approximately twelve missile strikes were executed using between one and four Tochka-U launchers, alongside about fifteen separate volleys from Smerch, utilizing up to three vehicles at a time.

According to InformNapalm’s analysis, the destruction of a T-72BA tank stationed at the base camp of Russia’s 21st Motorized Rifle Brigade west of Kumachevo during the Ilovaisk clashes might have resulted from a Tochka-U missile strike. Furthermore, reports surfaced in October 2014 indicating that militants claimed a missile had struck their military installation located within the premises of military unit No. 3023 in occupied Donetsk, close to Prokofiev Airport.

By August 2016, volunteers from the international InformNapalm community conducted research into the utilization of both the 9K79-1 Tochka-U and the 9K58 Smerch against Russian military units during the summer of 2014. Their findings revealed notable correlations between documented Russian military losses and potential Tochka-U missile launches.

== Structure ==
As of 2025 the brigade's structure is as follows:

- 19th Missile Brigade "Saint Barbara"
  - Brigade Headquarters and HQ Battery
  - 1st Field Artillery Divizion
  - 2nd Field Artillery Divizion
  - 3rd Field Artillery Divizion
  - 4th Field Artillery Divizion
  - 6th Security Battalion
  - Artillery Reconnaissance Battalion
  - Artillery Training Battalion (TBM)
  - Combat Engineer Company
  - Maintenance Company
  - Logistics Company
  - Signals Company
  - Radar Company
  - Medical Company
  - CBRN Protection Company
  - Brigade Military Band
