= Kumehnen Church =

Church building in Kumachyovo, Russia

Coordinates: 54°49′13″N 20°12′45″E

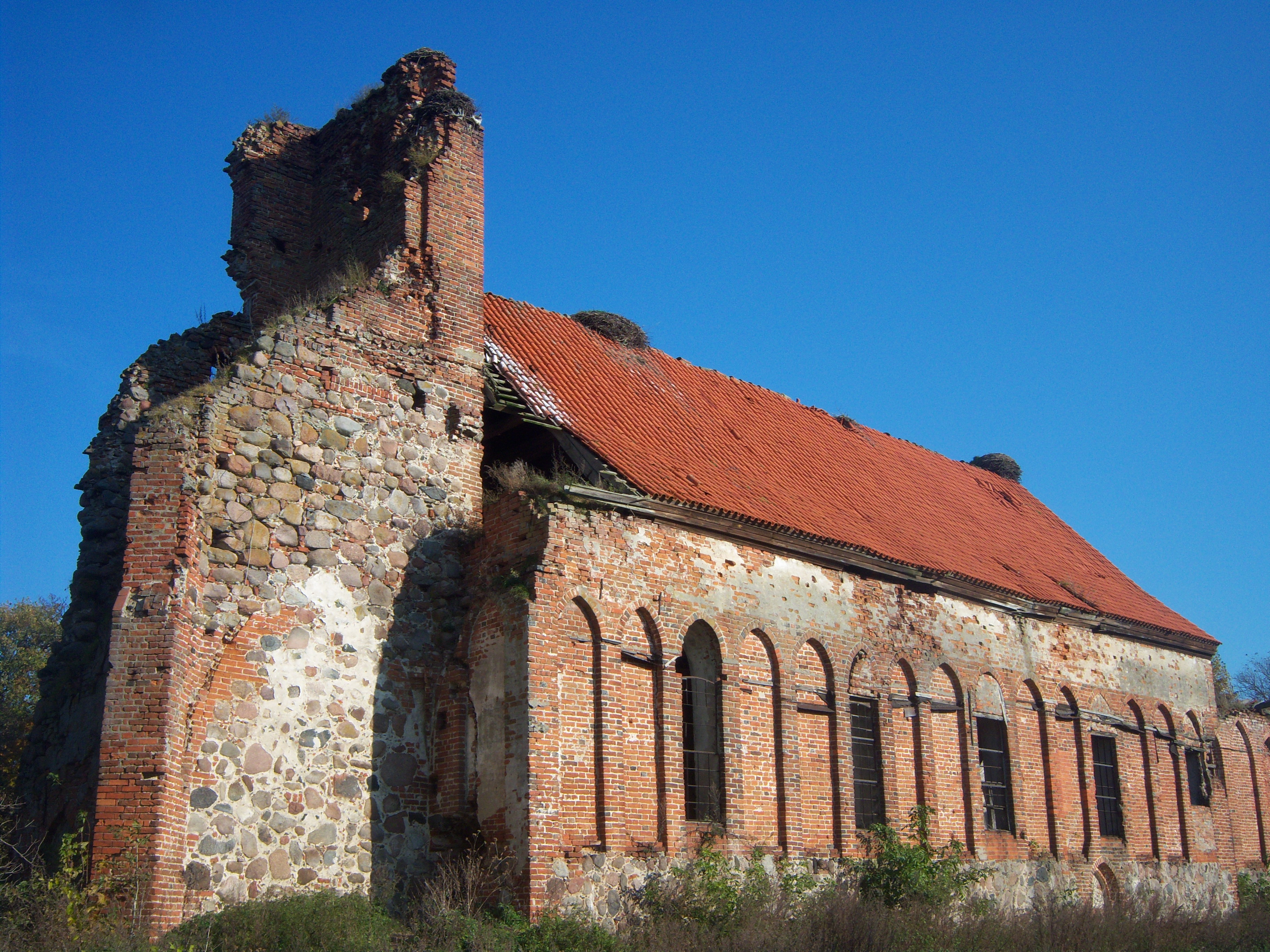
Kumehnen Church

The Church in Kumehnen is a church in the Kumachyovo district in Kaliningrad, Russia. Built in the 14th century, it is a Brick Gothic church. It was famous for its Baroque altar by the sculptor Johann Pfeffer from 1676. In 1945, the church was damaged.
