= Malaya Zemlya =

Soviet outpost in WWII

Coordinates: 44.689°N 37.797°E

- Part of the Battle of the Caucasus in the Eastern Front in the European theatre of World War II
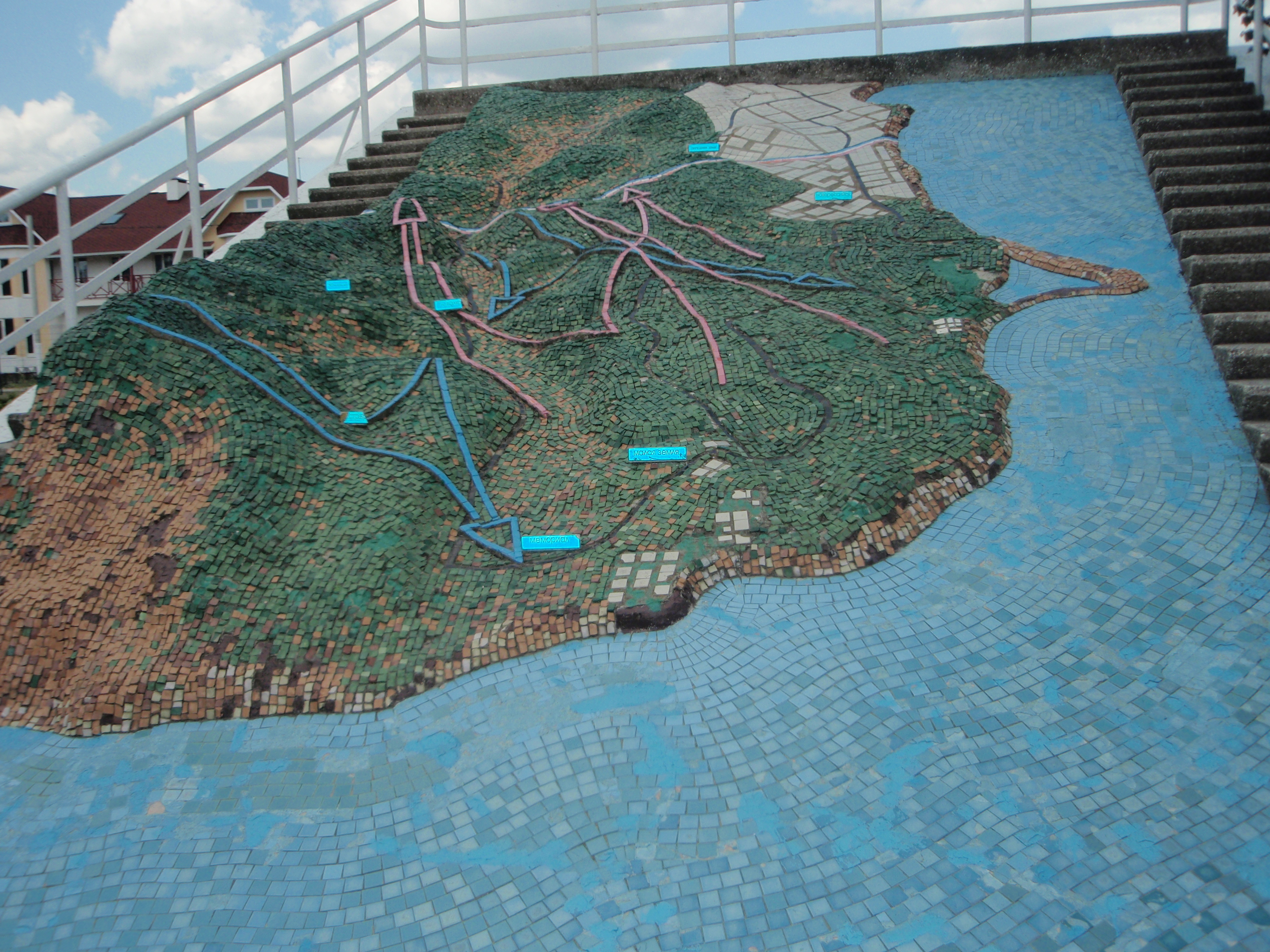
- The defense plan of Malaya Zemlya mosaic at the village of Myskhako
Date	4 February 1943
Location	Novorossiysk, Soviet Union
Result	Soviet Victory

Belligerents
Soviet Union	Germany

Commanders and leaders
(Soviet Union) Major Tsezar Kunikov (DOW)	(Nazi Germany) Colonel-General Richard Ruoff

Units involved
Transcaucasus Front: 18th Army; Black Sea Fleet	Army Group A: 17th Army

Strength
800	Unknown

Casualties and losses
Unknown	Unknown

Malaya Zemlya (Russian: Малая Земля, lit. "Small Land") was a Soviet uphill outpost on Cape Myskhako (Russian: Мысхако), situated westward from Tsemes Bay on the Black Sea, that was recaptured after battles with the Germans during the Battle of the Caucasus on the night of 4 February 1943. The episode paved way for a Soviet attack on German forces in Novorossiysk.

== History ==
Cape Myskhako is associated with a stand made by the 800-strong contingent of the Soviet Naval Infantry against the Germans during the Second World War. The special forces were dropped during winter high storms by the Soviet Black Sea Fleet, after the unsuccessful landing attempt at Malajia Ozereevka. The landing at Malaya Zemlya had aimed to be a decoy, but after a second landing at Bolshaia Ozereevka was lost in an ambush, the offensive plan was reworked and the landing site at Malaya Zemlya was made the main landing location. Upon landing to secure the beachhead, they came under a German counter-offensive with air support.

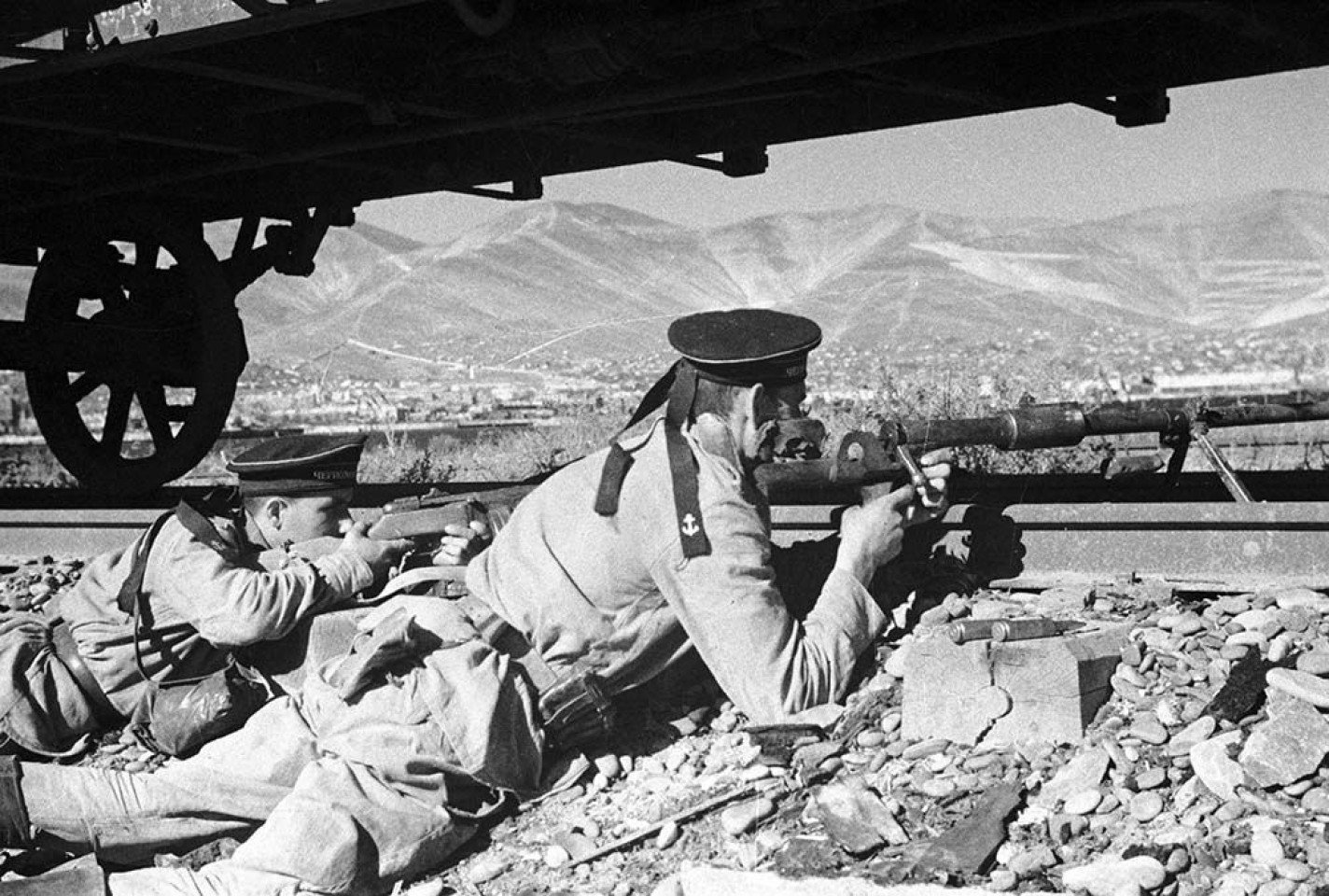
Black Sea Fleet Marines during the battle for the liberation of Novorossiysk

The marines held their ground. The leader of the group, Major Tsezar Kunikov, was mortally wounded and died on 14 February 1943. He was posthumously awarded the highest Soviet honor Hero of the Soviet Union.

The battle was the subject of the first book of Brezhnev's trilogy, which exaggerated Leonid Brezhnev's role in the Eastern Front.

A notable casualty of this battle was chess master Mark Stolberg, who went missing during the battle.

== Malaya Zemlya Memorial ==
The Malaya Zemlya memorial complex was dedicated to Kunikov and his detachment which fought on Malaya Zemlya. The memorial was designed and constructed by Yakov Belopolsky, Roman Grigorievich Kananin, and Vladimir Iosifovich Khavin in 1982. The Gallery of Military Glory at the memorial features 30 bas relief portraits of Hero's of the Soviet Union as well as 22 banners made of red Karelian granite which list the formations that took part in the liberation of Novorossiysk including 19 units of the 18th Army and the Black Sea Fleet.

=== Gallery ===
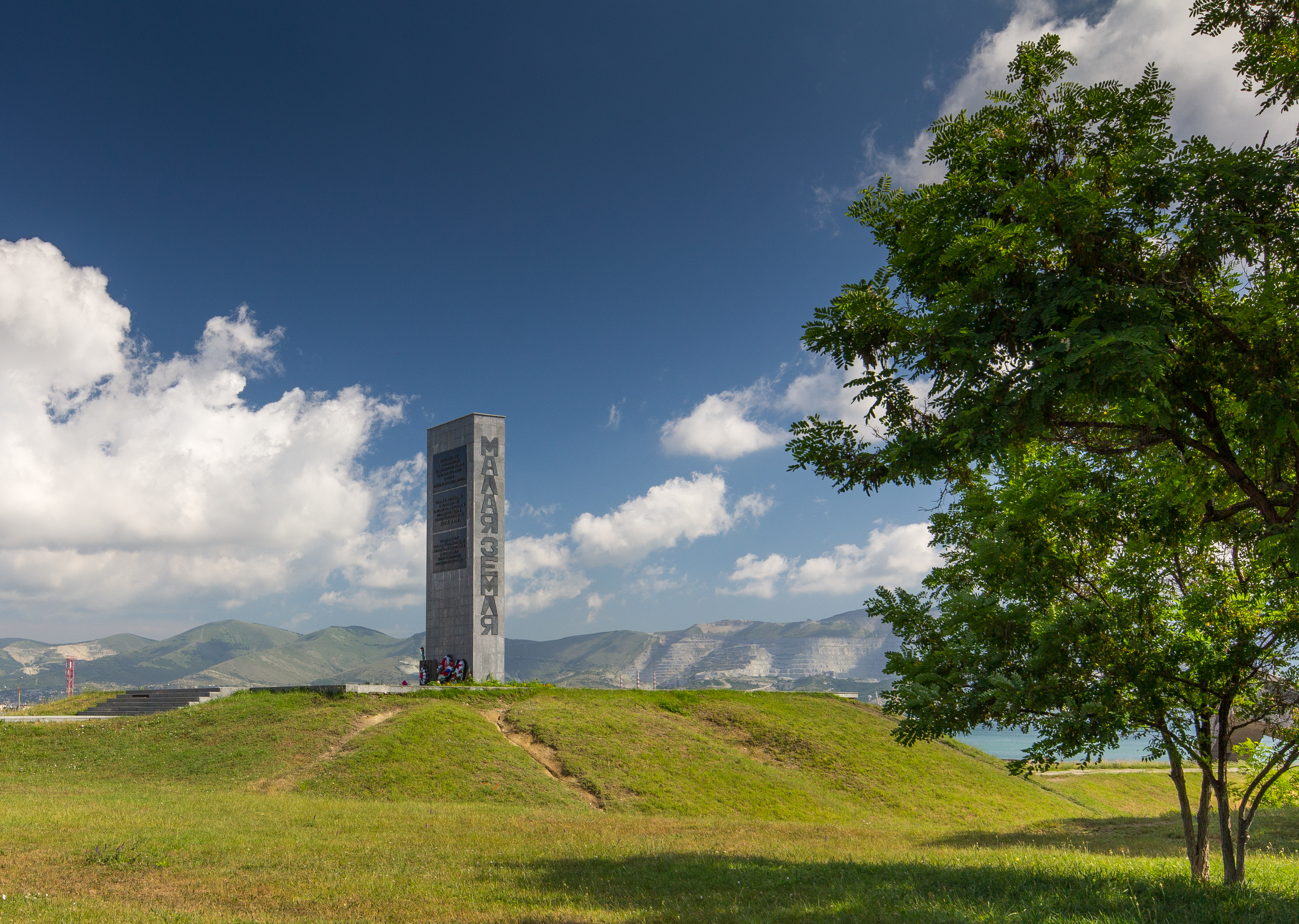
Memorial stele

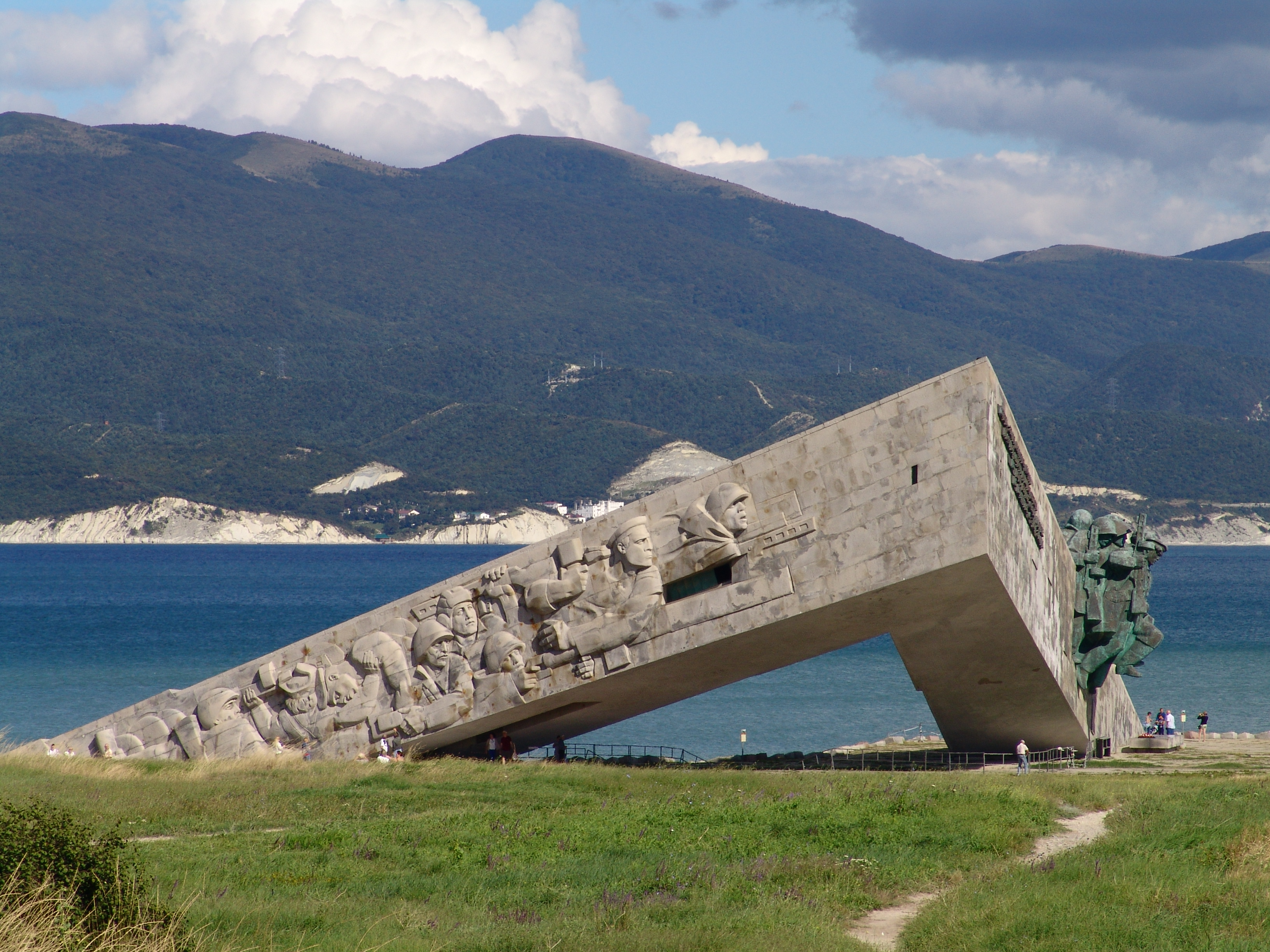
View of the right side of the memorial

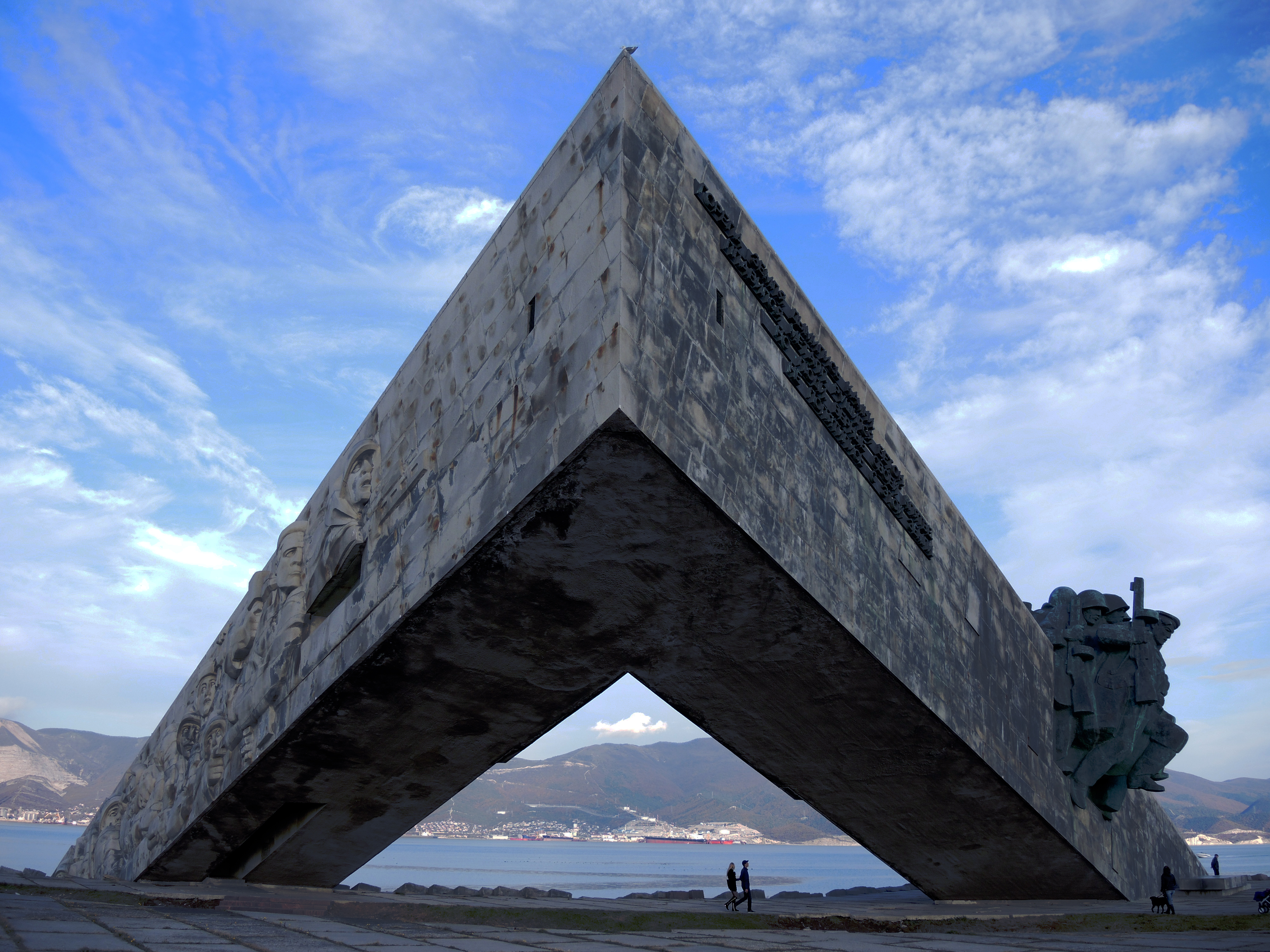
Arch

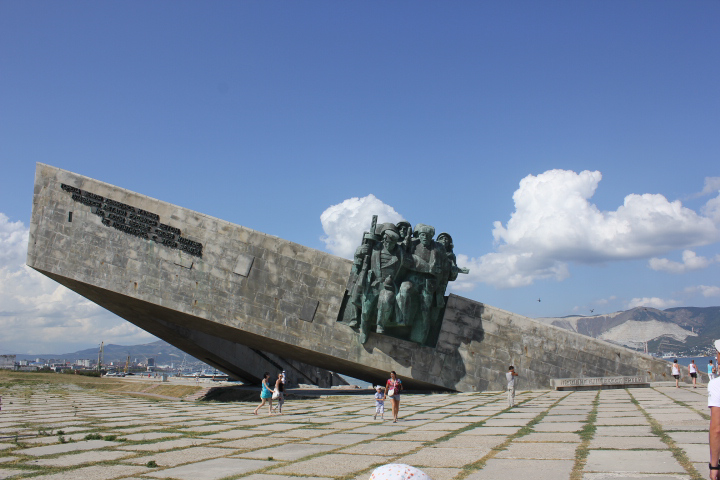
View of the left side of the memorial

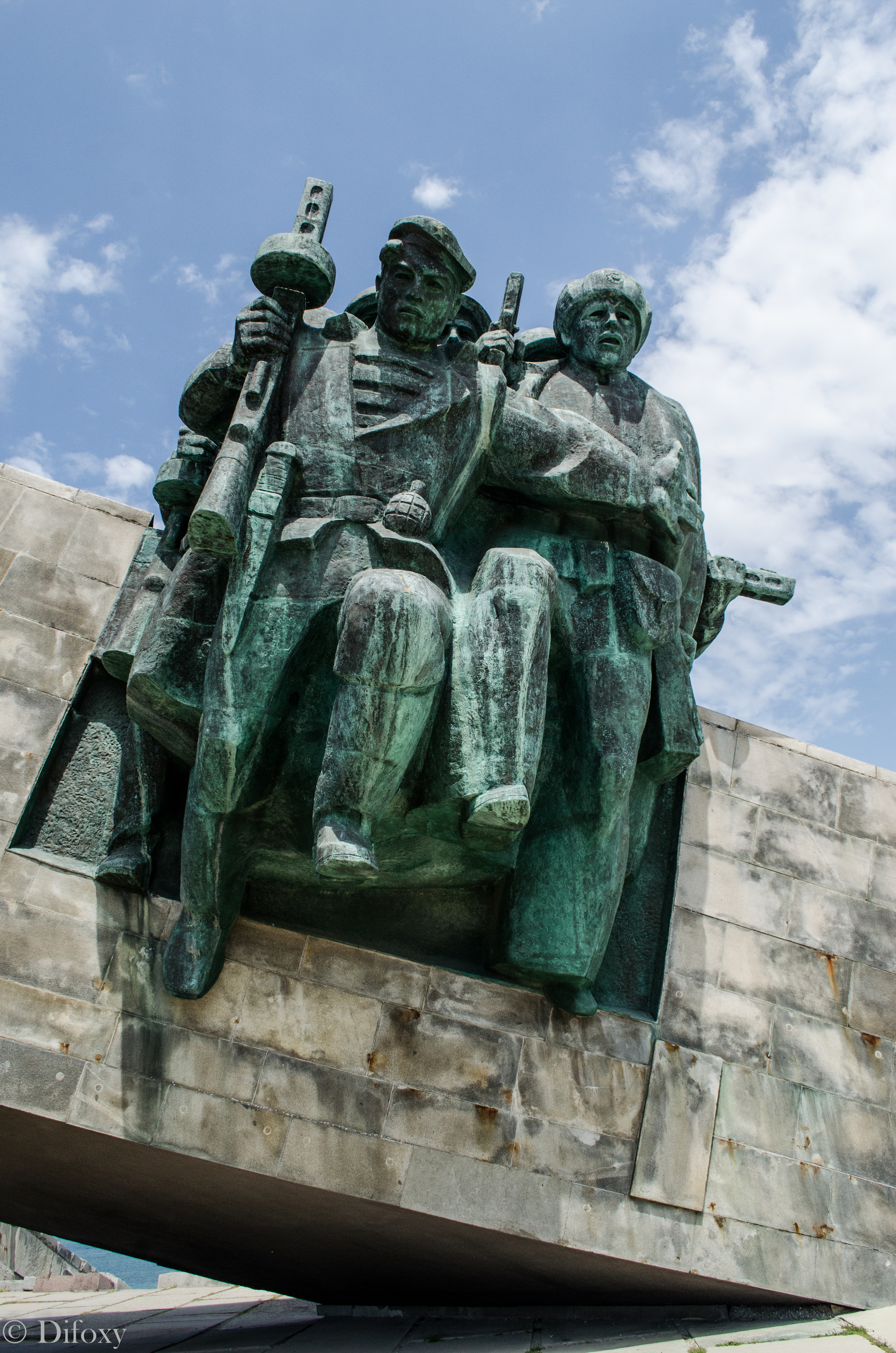
Sculptural group

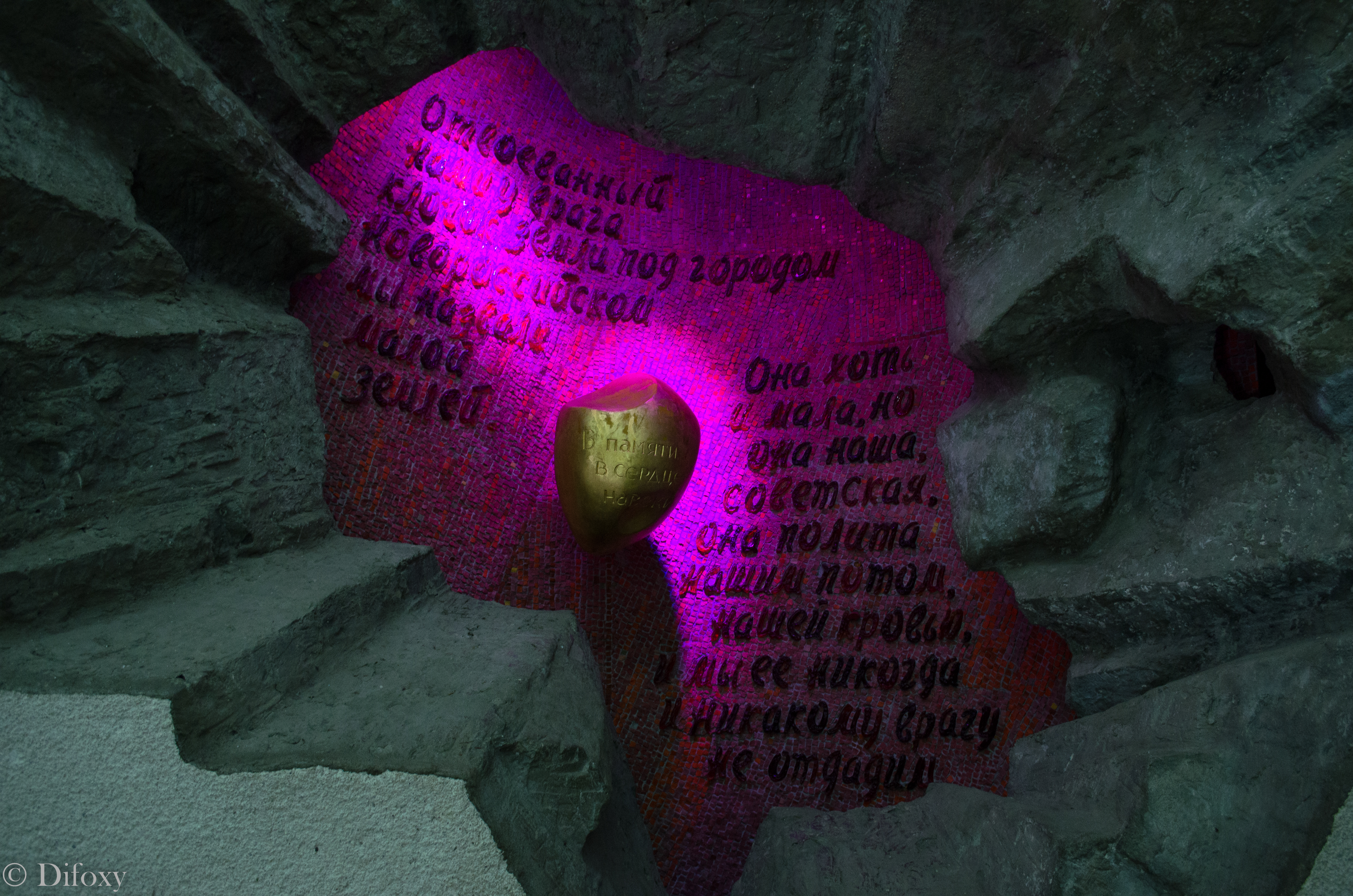
The memorial's capsule
