= Russian landing ship Saratov =

Landing ship of the Russian Black Sea Fleet

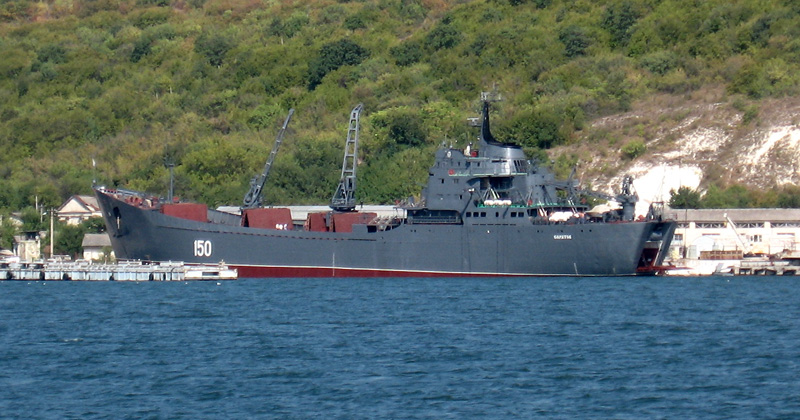
- Saratov at Sevastopol in 2007.

History

Russia
- Name: BDK-10 (1964-1967); Voronezhsky Komsomolets (1967-1992); BDK-65 (1992-2003); Saratov (2003-2022)
- Namesake: Saratov Oblast
- Builder: Yantar Shipyard
- Yard number: 219
- Laid down: 5 February 1964
- Launched: 1 July 1964
- Commissioned: 1966
- Home port: Sevastopol
- Identification: Hull number: 9 (1966-1968); 447 (1968-1972); 419 (1972-1974); 442 (1974); 405 (1974); 431 (1974); 435 (1974-1982); 136 (1982); 139 (1982-1985); 142 (1985-1990); 150 (1990-present)
- Fate: Sunk on 24 March 2022, after being hit by missiles.

General characteristics
- Class & type: Tapir-class landing ship
- Displacement: 3,400 tons standard; 4,360–4,700 tons full load
- Length: 112.8–113.1 m (370 ft 1 in – 371 ft 1 in)
- Beam: 15.3–15.6 m (50 ft 2 in – 51 ft 2 in)
- Draft: 4.5 m (14 ft 9 in)
- Propulsion: 2 diesels, 2 shafts, 9,000 bhp (6,700 kW)
- Speed: 16–18 knots (30–33 km/h)
- Capacity: 1,000 tons
- Troops: 300–425 troops and 20 tanks, or 40 AFVs, or 1,000 tons
- Crew: 55
- Armament: Missiles: 1 × 122 mm naval Grad bombardment rocket launcher in some, 3 × SA-N-5 SAM positions in some.; Guns: 1 dual 57 mm/70 cal DP, 2 dual 25 mm AA in some.

Saratov (Russian: Саратов) was a Tapir-class landing ship of the Black Sea Fleet of the Russian Navy. She was destroyed on 24 March 2022, while in the port of Berdyansk, after being struck by a Ukrainian missile.

Named Saratov, the ship was built in Kaliningrad and launched in 1964. She was named BDK-10 (Russian: БДК-10) for Russian: Большой десантный корабль, romanized: Bolshoy desantnyi korabl', lit. 'large landing ship', and then renamed Voronezhsky Komsomolets in 1967. With the dissolution of the Soviet Union in 1991, she was renamed BDK-65 in 1992, and then Saratov in 2003. She is one of the first subtype of the Tapir-class landing ships, designated Project 1171 by the Russian Navy.

== Construction and commissioning ==
Saratov was built by Yantar Shipyard in Kaliningrad, being laid down on 5 February 1964 and launched on 1 July 1964 as BDK-10. She was commissioned into the Soviet Navy on 18 August 1966 as part of its Black Sea Fleet. She was homeported in Sevastopol, and with the dissolution of the Soviet Union in late December 1991, she went on to serve in the Russian Navy.

== Career ==
Entering service as BDK-10, she was renamed Voronezhsky Komsomolets in honour of the Komsomol association in Voronezh on 22 February 1967. She went on to make more than 20 long-distance cruises carrying troops between 1966 and 2004. In 1991 she was laid up inactive in Odesa, and with the dissolution of the Soviet Union later that year, her Soviet-era name was changed to BDK-65. She was reactivated in 1994, and in August 2000 made four voyages from Gonio, Georgia, to Utrishenok, Russia, carrying equipment of the Russian Transcaucasus Group of Forces. Renamed Saratov on 26 July 2003, she was active during the Russo-Georgian War in August 2008, being involved with other Russian ships in a battle off the coast of Abkhazia with Georgian gunboats on 10 August.

In autumn and winter 2012, Saratov made voyages to the Mediterranean Sea, and in January 2013, suffered the breakdown of her diesel generator while sailing to join exercises in the Mediterranean. She was repaired at the naval facility in Tartus. She made a further four visits to the Mediterranean in 2014, being part of the Syrian Express during the Russian intervention in the Syrian civil war, and in 2015, was present at the Sevastopol Navy Day naval parade. In November 2012, Saratov took part in an operation with other Black Sea Fleet ships in anchoring off the coast of Gaza. The ship movement was ostensibly to prepare to evacuate Russian citizens from Israel in case the Israeli–Palestinian conflict there escalated. Other ships in the operation included Novocherkassk and Moskva.

== Loss ==
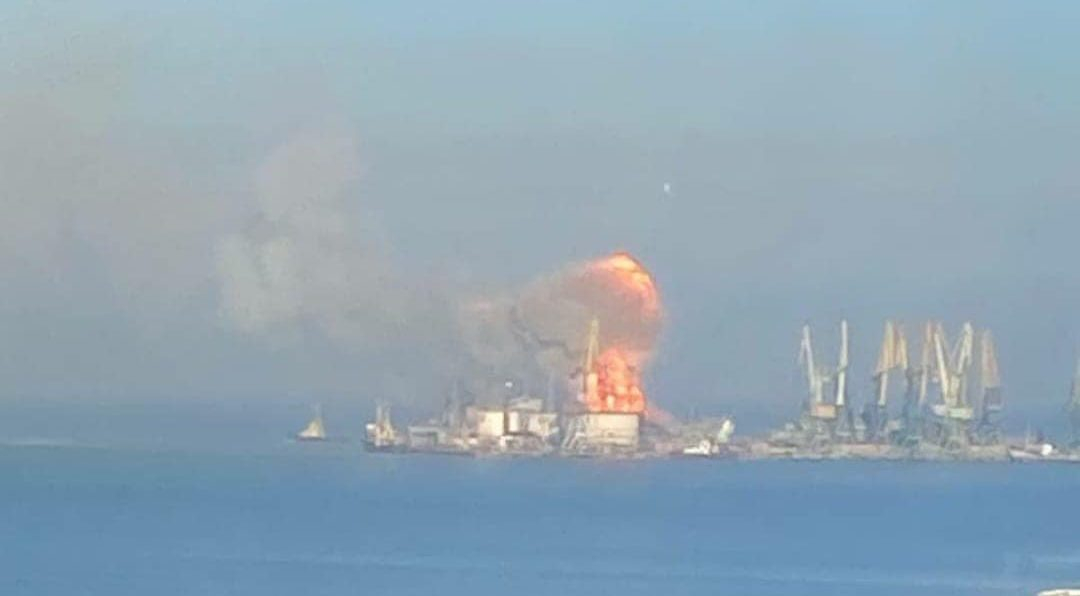
Saratov explodes in the Port of Berdiansk on 24 March 2022

Saratov was one of the Black Sea Fleet's landing forces used to support the Russian invasion of Ukraine from February 2022. The Port of Berdiansk was captured, and on 21 March, Russian media Zvezda reported on the arrival of amphibious transports in Berdiansk. At 7:45 on 24 March the port was struck by what Ukrainian officials claimed was a OTR-21 Tochka tactical ballistic missile launched by the 19th Missile Brigade . Saratov caught fire and suffered a large explosion, suggested to be as a result of ammunition in her cargo. Two nearby Ropucha-class landing ships, the Tsezar Kunikov, and the Novocherkassk, were also damaged in the attack and explosion, but were able to leave port. Satellite imagery later confirmed the Saratov had sunk in the harbour, with her superstructure visible above the surface. On 2 July Russia announced that the ship had been damaged by a missile strike and scuttled by her crew "to prevent detonation of the on-board munitions", and that she had been salvaged and would be towed to Kerch in Crimea.
