= Russian landing ship Novocherkassk =

Russian Navy landing ship

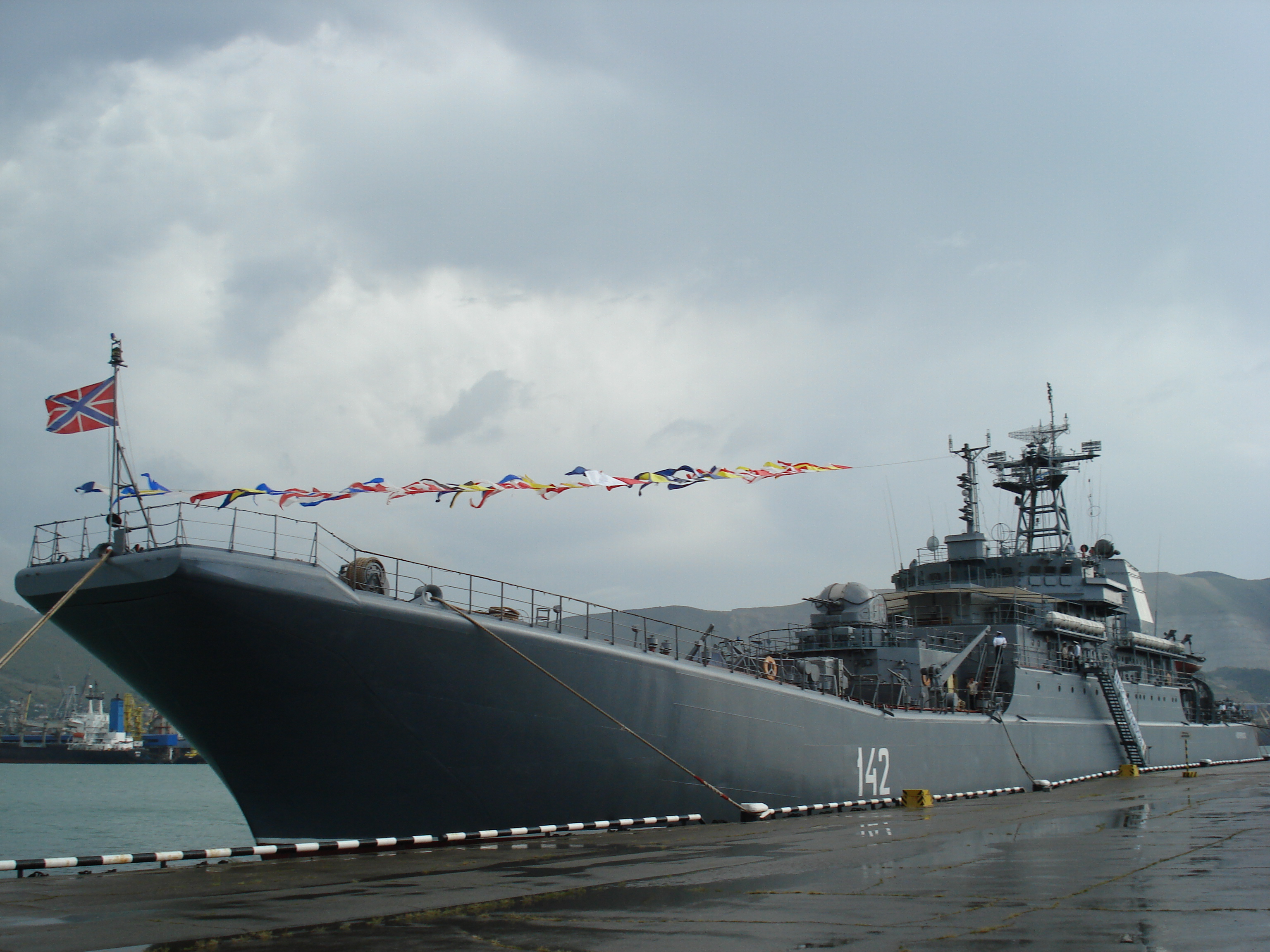
- Novocherkassk in port at Novorossiysk in 2010

History

Russia
- Name: Novocherkassk
- Namesake: Novocherkassk
- Builder: Stocznia Północna, Gdańsk, Poland
- Yard number: 142
- Launched: 17 April 1987
- Commissioned: 30 November 1987
- Out of service: 26 December 2023
- Fate: Destroyed at Feodosia, Crimea

General characteristics
- Class & type: Ropucha-class landing ship
- Displacement: 3,450 t (3,396 long tons) standard; 4,080 t (4,016 long tons) full load
- Length: 112.5 m (369 ft 1 in)
- Beam: 15.01 m (49 ft 3 in)
- Draught: 4.26 m (14 ft 0 in)
- Ramps: Over bows and at stern
- Installed power: 3 × 750 kW (1,006 hp) diesel generators
- Propulsion: 2 × 9,600 hp (7,159 kW) Zgoda-Sulzer 16ZVB40/48 diesel engines
- Speed: 18 knots (33 km/h; 21 mph)
- Range: 6,000 nmi (11,000 km; 6,900 mi) at 12 knots (22 km/h; 14 mph); 3,500 nmi (6,500 km; 4,000 mi) at 16 knots (30 km/h; 18 mph)
- Endurance: 30 days
- Capacity: 10 × main battle tanks and 340 troops or 12 × BTR APC and 340 troops or 3 × main battle tanks, 3 × 2S9 Nona-S SPG, 5 × MT-LB APC, 4 trucks and 313 troops or 500 tons of cargo
- Complement: 98
- Armament: 2 × AK-725 twin 57 mm (2.2 in) DP guns; 4 × 8 Strela 2 SAM launchers; 2 × 22 A-215 Grad-M rocket launchers

Novocherkassk (BDK-46) was a Ropucha-class landing ship of the Russian Navy and part of the Black Sea Fleet. Named after Russian city of Novocherkassk, the ship was built in Poland and launched in 1987.

The ship was attacked twice during the Russo-Ukrainian war, being damaged in March 2022, and attacked again in December 2023. In the second attack, the Ukrainian Air Force fired cruise missiles at the ship while the ship was at a naval base in Feodosia, Crimea. While Russian officials admitted the ship was damaged, Ukrainian Air Force officials said that the ship sustained extensive damage due to secondary explosions which would make repairs difficult. The UK Ministry of Defence assessed the ship as "completely destroyed", and the UK Defence Secretary said the ship's destruction showed "Russia’s dominance in the Black Sea is now challenged." Subsequent satellite imagery and photographs attributed to Crimean observers showed that the ship suffered extensive damage and was partially submerged in port after the attack.

== Description ==
Novocherkassk had a standard displacement of 3,450 t (3,400 long tons), a length of 112.5 metres (369 ft 1 in), a beam of 15 metres (49 ft 3 in), and a draft of 3.7 metres (12 ft 2 in). It had two diesel engines which gave a maximum speed of 17.8 knots (33.0 km/h; 20.5 mph), and a range of 6,000 nautical miles (11,000 km; 6,900 mi) at 12 knots (22 km/h; 14 mph). It was armed with two AK-725 57 mm artillery mounts and two 122 mm multiple rocket launch systems.

It was capable of carrying up to 500 tons of cargo and 225 embarked soldiers. Additionally, the ship could hold 10 main battle tanks, while the ship deck was able to hold 25 armored personnel carriers. In normal operating situations it had a crew of 87.

== History ==
The ship was launched on 17 April 1987. In November of the same year, the ship was included in the Soviet Navy's Black Sea Fleet. The ship was stationed at lake Donuzlav. Before the dissolution of the Soviet Union the ship participated in various military exercises. In 1990–2007 it has been under conservation. In 2002, the ship was renamed to Novocherkassk, after the city that took patronage over it.

In November 2012, Novocherkassk took part in an operation with other Black Sea Fleet ships in anchoring off the coast of Gaza. The ship movement was ostensibly to prepare to evacuate Russian citizens from Israel in case the Israeli–Palestinian conflict there escalated. Other ships in the operation included Saratov and Moskva. In 2015, Novocherkassk was a part of Black Sea Fleet exercises in the Mediterranean which corresponded with a Russian buildup of military forces in Syria.

In March 2020, the ship set out for Syria, with sister landing ship Tsezar Kunikov and frigates Admiral Grigorovich and Admiral Makarov, in response to growing tensions with Turkey and the withdrawal of American troops from Syria. The ships' movement spurred concerns over the spread of the COVID-19 virus from and to Russia.

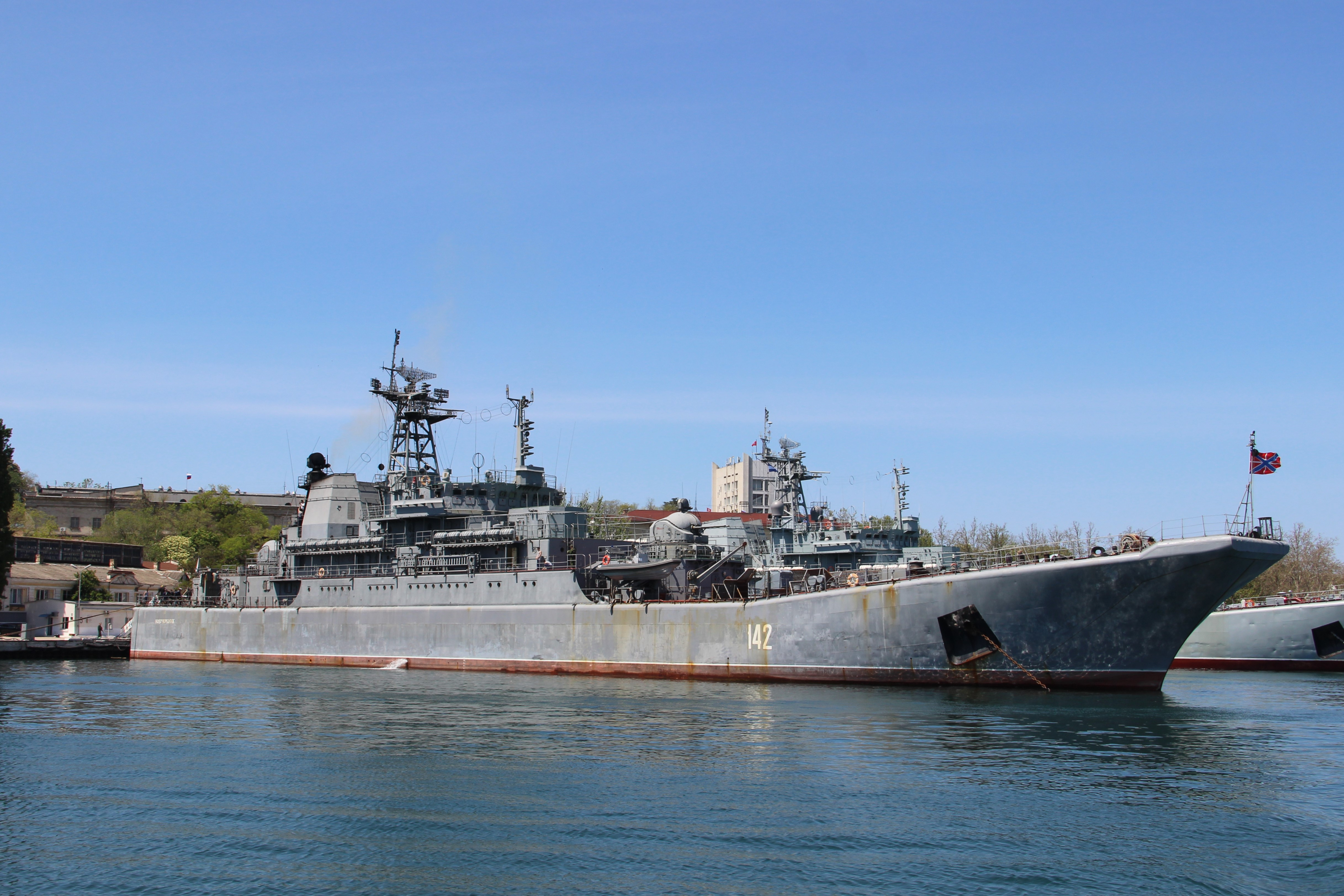
Novocherkassk in Sevastopol in 2015

=== Russian invasion of Ukraine ===
In March 2022, roughly a month into Russia's invasion of Ukraine, Novocherkassk was docked in the port of Berdiansk in southern Ukraine with a number of other Russian warships. A Ukrainian missile attack on 25 March damaged several Russian ships there, sinking Saratov and damaging Novocherkassk. By June 2022, Russian state media outlet TASS claimed that Novocherkassk was one of twelve landing ships in the Black Sea that could launch an amphibious operation in Ukraine. However, Novocherkassk was not confirmed to be repaired, and its status remained unknown. On 24 August 2022 it was reported Novocherkassk and sister ship Tsezar Kunikov were out of action due to lack of spare parts to repair the ships. The lack of spare parts was attributed to the sanctions imposed on Russia.

Ukrainian air force spokesmen stated that afterwards the ship was used heavily for logistics to transport weapons and soldiers from Russia to the Zaporizhzhia region of Ukraine. After the Kerch Bridge attack, Russia looked for alternative means to supply Crimea, with large landing ships such as the Novocherkassk being key.

==== December 2023 strike ====
On 26 December 2023, Novocherkassk was struck by Ukrainian cruise missiles while it was in a naval base in the city of Feodosia in Russian-occupied Crimea. The Ukrainian Air Force released a statement saying that they believed the ship was used to transport Iranian-made attack unmanned aerial vehicles (UAVs). According to Ukraine's Air Force the vessel suffered secondary explosions and will be difficult to repair. Videos posted to social media show very large explosions seen at the Feodosia port after the attack. Andrii Klymenko, the head of the Black Sea Institute of Strategic Studies analyzed video of the attack and told The New York Times: "Judging by the video of the explosion, which was very powerful, it was carrying explosives: either shells or missiles, or, as some people say, drones".

Russian officials confirmed the attack, and claimed that one person was killed and two injured by a fire in the city started by the attack, while describing the ship as damaged. Russian officials also claimed that two Ukrainian Su-24s were shot down by anti-aircraft fire during the attack, which Ukraine denied. Satellite imagery taken by the company Maxar after the strike showed extensive damage to the ship, with the ship partially submerged alongside its pier, with billowing smoke coming from it. However, other sources claimed much higher Russian casualties. The Ukrainian Navy claimed that 80 Russian personnel had been killed, while Russian opposition news outlet Astra reported that there were 77 Russian military personnel aboard the ship at the time of the strike, of whom 33 were missing and 19 were wounded. Later, on 29 December, a Ukrainian hacker group claimed that 74 Russian soldiers were killed, while 27 were wounded. A Russian memorial site lists the names of 34 Russian sailors who were killed.

Ukrainian President Zelenskyy released a statement about the attack saying: "I am grateful to our Air Force for the spectacular replenishment of the Russian Black Sea submarine fleet with another vessel. There will be no peaceful place for the occupiers in Ukraine". President of Russia Vladimir Putin was informed of the strike via the Russian Defense minister Sergey Shoigu. U.K. Defense Secretary Grant Shapps wrote that he believed the destruction of the ship was proof there was not a stalemate in the conflict, and that "over the past 4 months 20% of Russia’s Black Sea Fleet has been destroyed. Russia’s dominance in the Black Sea is now challenged.”

The attack is part of a series of attacks on Russian ships, designed to constrain their ability to move troops and materials from Russia to occupied sections of Ukraine.
