= Kumachyovo =

Kumachyovo Кумачёво
- Rural locality
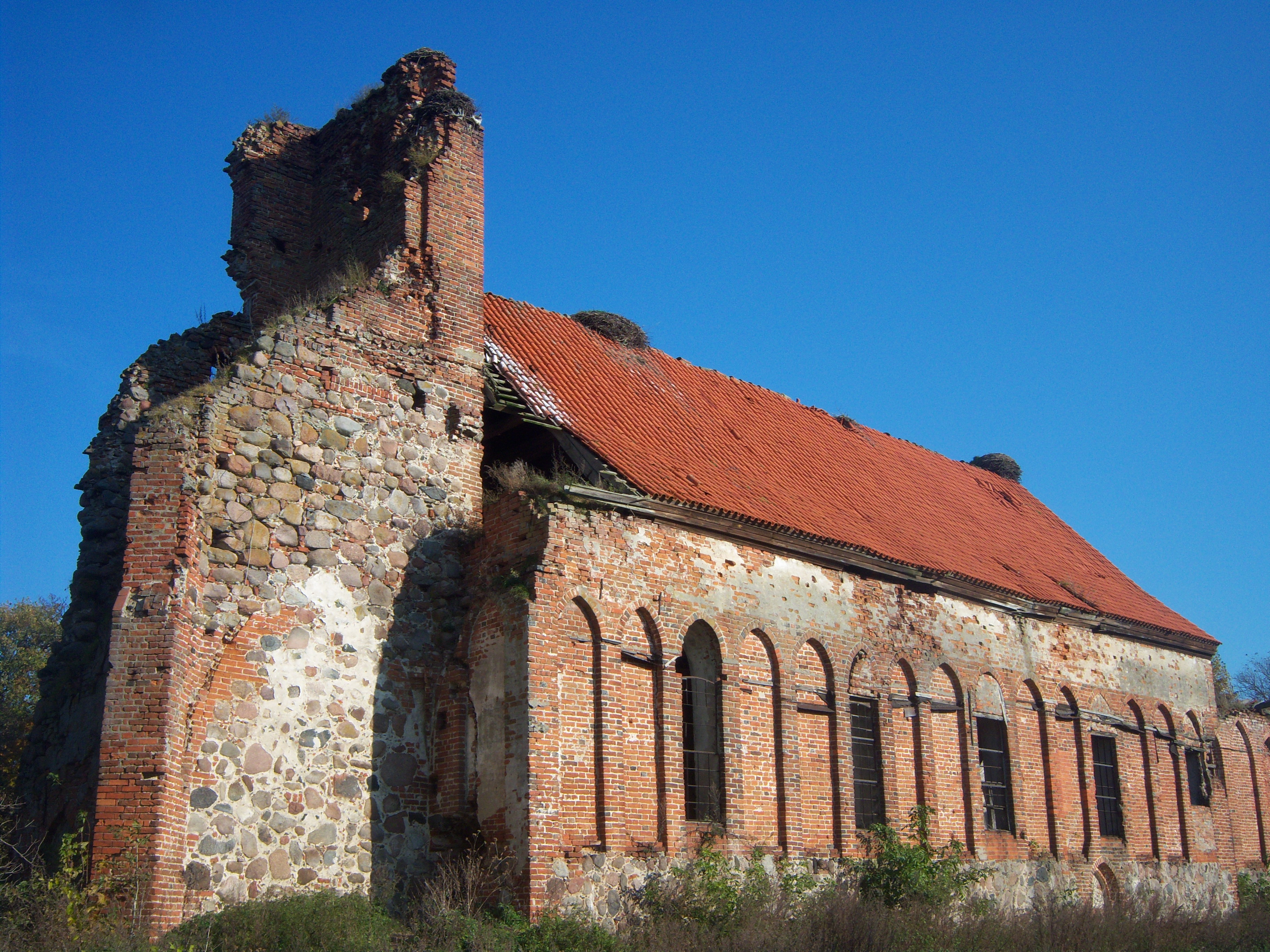
- Medieval church ruins
- Interactive map of Kumachyovo
- Location of Kumachyovo Kumachyovo (European Russia) Kumachyovo (Russia)
- Coordinates: 54.821°N 20.214°E
- Country: Russia
- Federal subject: Kaliningrad Oblast
- Administrative district: Zelenogradsky District
- Elevation: 71 m (233 ft)

Population (2010 Census)
  - Total: 541
  - Estimate (2010): 541 (0%)
- Time zone: UTC+2 (MSK–1)
- Postal code: 238542
- OKTMO ID: 27710000611

Kumachyovo or Kumachevo (Russian: Кумачёво; German: Kumehnen; Lithuanian: Kumėnai) is a rural settlement in Zelenogradsky District, Kaliningrad Oblast, Russia, part of the Pereslavskoye rural municipality. It is located on the Sambian Peninsula.

== History ==
The local Gothic church was built in 1390. In 1454, King Casimir IV Jagiellon incorporated the region to the Kingdom of Poland upon the request of the Prussian Confederation. After the subsequent Thirteen Years' War (1454–1466), it became a part of Poland as a fief held by the Teutonic Knights until 1525, and by Ducal Prussia afterwards.

From the 18th century it formed part of the Kingdom of Prussia, and from 1871 it was also part of the German Empire, within which it was located in the province of East Prussia. After Germany's defeat in World War II, in 1945, it passed to the Soviet Union. In the post-war period, the abandoned church gradually deteriorated.
