= Tsezar Kunikov =

Soviet naval infantry officer (1909–1943)

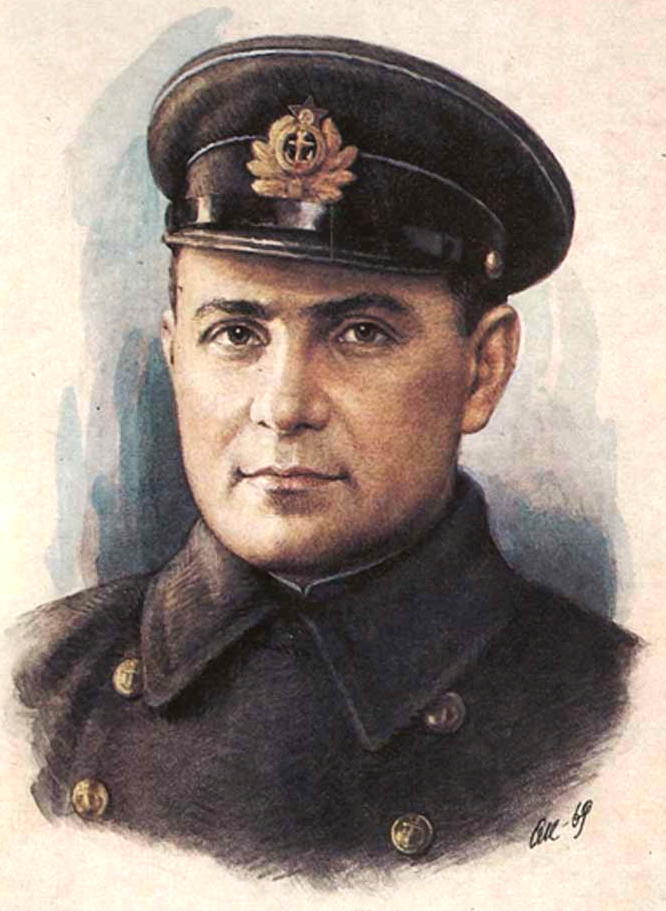
- Born: 23 June 1909; Rostov-on-Don, Don Host Oblast, Russian Empire
- Died: 14 February 1943 (aged 33) Gelendzhik, Russian SFSR, Soviet Union
- Allegiance: Soviet Union
- Branch: Soviet Naval Infantry
- Service years: 1941–1943
- Rank: Major
- Conflicts: World War II
- Awards: Hero of the Soviet Union

Tsezar (Caesar) Lvovich Kunikov (Russian: Це́зарь Льво́вич Ку́ников; 23 June 1909 – 14 February 1943) was an officer in the Soviet Naval Infantry. He served as commanding officer of a landing party that recaptured the beach-head at Malaya Zemlya during World War II.

== Biography ==
Kunikov was born in Rostov on Don in a Jewish family. His father was an engineer and moved to Moscow in 1925. Kunikov worked in the Soyuz factory as a machinist. In 1932, he began studies at the Bauman Moscow State Technical University, and held the position of a technical manager in a machine building factory by 1938.

At the start of the war Kunikov volunteered for the Red Army and served in the Naval infantry of the Black Sea Fleet. Kunikov fought in the battle for Novorossiysk and the defence of Malaya Zemlya. He was mortally wounded in February 1943 in Novorossiysk.

He was posthumously named a Hero of the Soviet Union for his heroic actions.

== Commemoration ==
- Russian ship Tsezar Kunikov – a Russian landing ship reportedly sunk by Ukraine on 14 February 2024, the 81st anniversary of Kunikov's death
- 2280 Kunikov – an asteroid
