= Port of Berdiansk =

Coordinates: 46°45′02″N 36°46′45″E

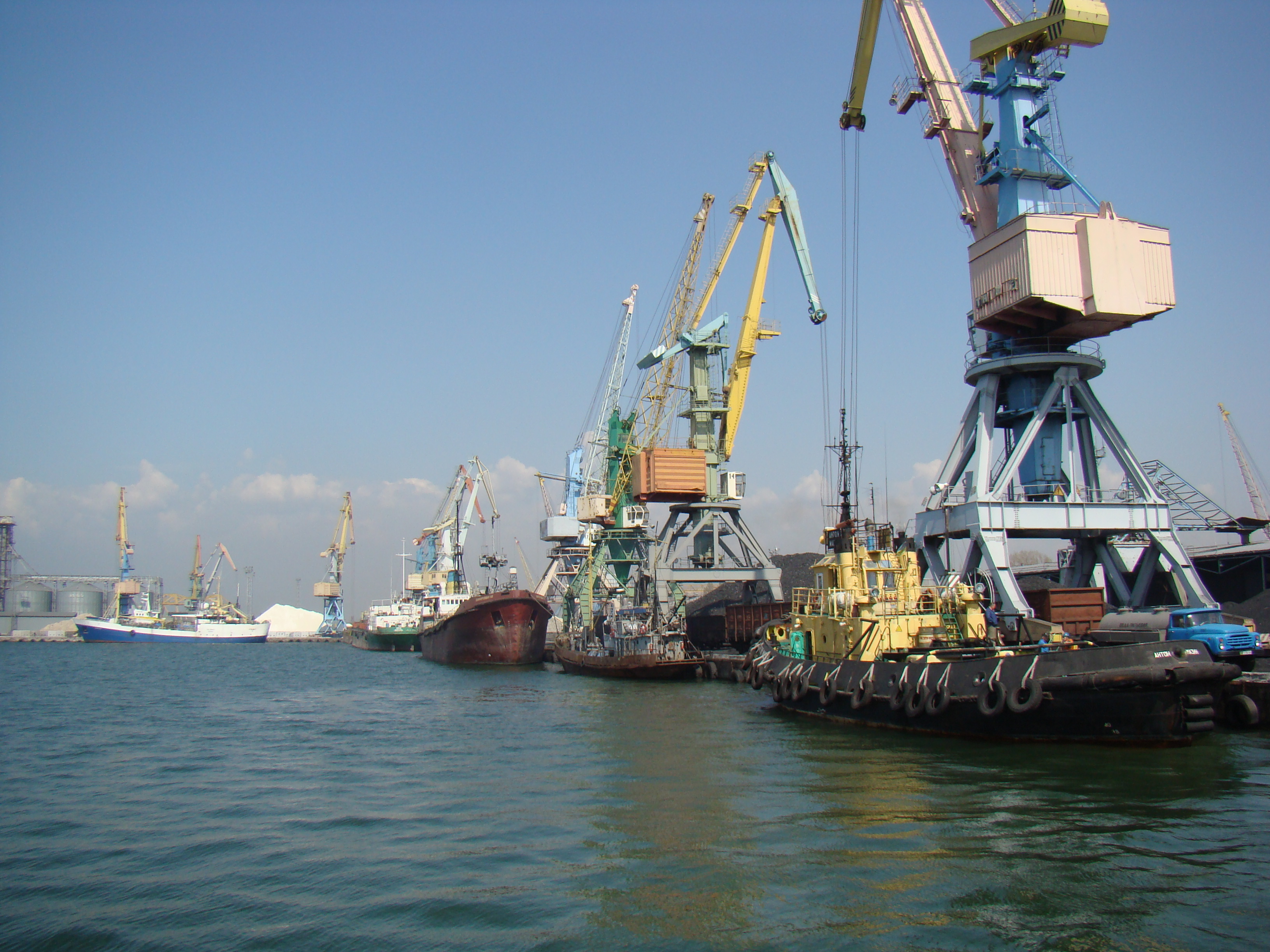
- Interactive map of Port of Berdiansk
- Native name: Бердянський морський порт

Location
- Country: Ukraine
- Location: Berdiansk

Details
- Opened: 1835
- Owned by: Ministry of Infrastructure (Ukraine); Temporarily occupied by RF
- Land area: 168,160 м²
- Size: 274,816 м²
- No. of berths: 10
- No. of piers: 10
- Head of the seaport: Taras Mykolayovych Verniba (Bohdan Babets, soon to be replaced by Nikolai Ilyin)

Statistics
- Annual cargo tonnage: 4.45 million tons (2015)
- Water density: 1008
- Salinity of water: 11.9
- Radio Channels: call sign "Berdyansk-Radio-1"; 2, 24, 73, 93
- Website www.bmtport.com.ua uspa.gov.ua

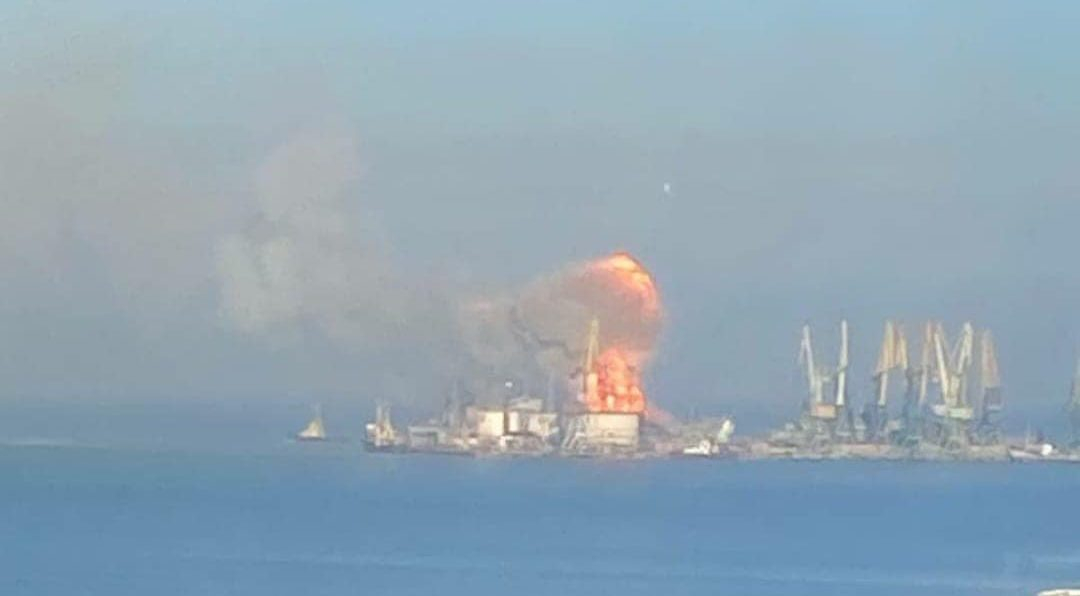
Russian landing ship Saratov destroyed near Berdyansk port.

The Port of Berdiansk is a seaport in the city of Berdiansk, Ukraine, on the Sea of Azov. It is the only port in the Zaporizhzhia Oblast and one of Ukraine's two Azov ports (along with Mariupol).

According to the Law "On Seaports of Ukraine," the functions of the seaport administration are performed by the Berdiansk branch of the state enterprise of the Ukrainian Sea Ports Authority. The seaport is guarded by the Berdyansk Border Detachment.

Since 27 February 2022, Berdiansk has been under Russian occupation.

== See also ==
- 2022 Berdiansk port attack
