= Russian ship Tsezar Kunikov =

Project 775 landing ship

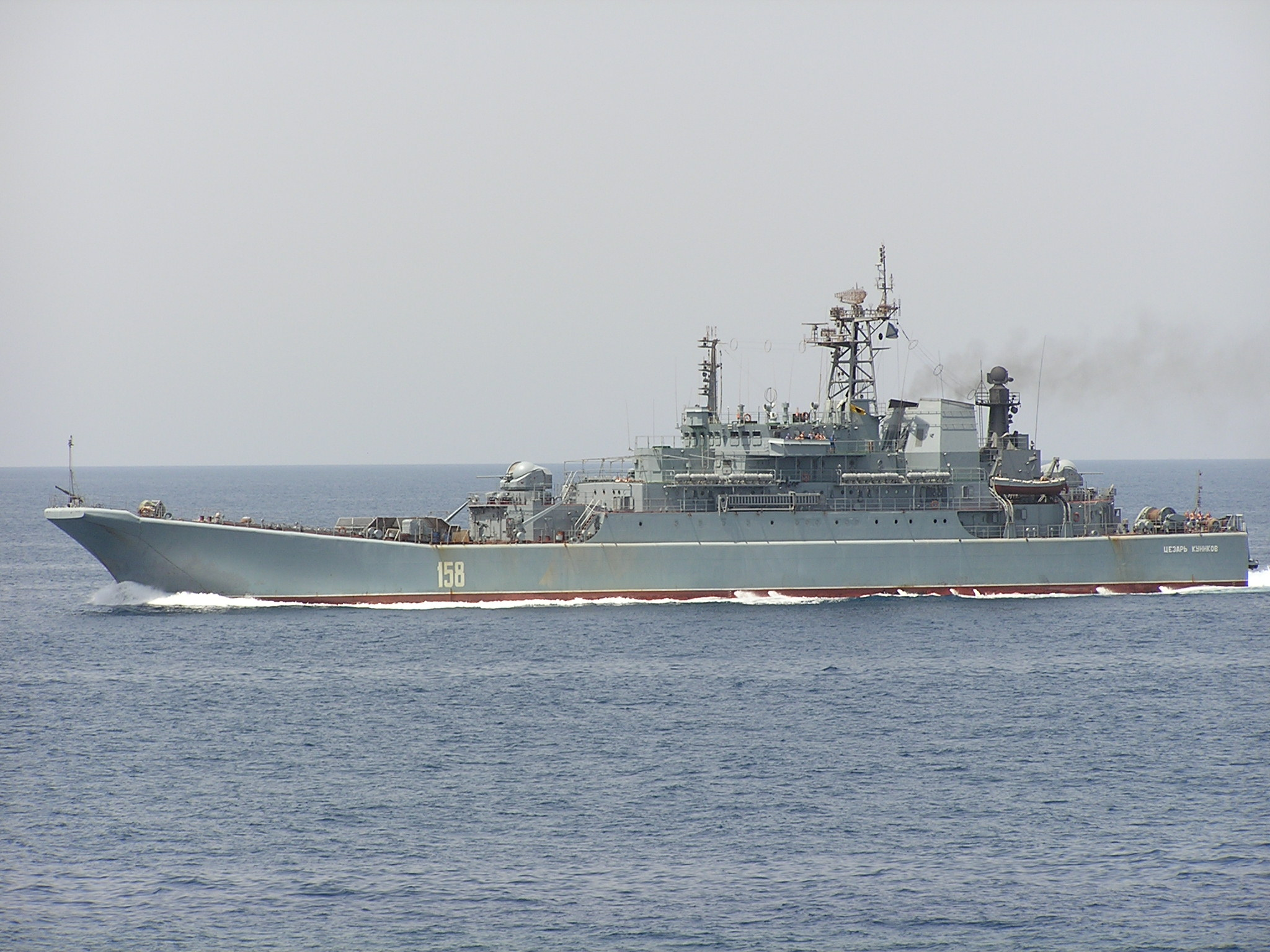
- Tsezar Kunikov in the Red Sea, 2003

History

Russia
- Name: Tsezar Kunikov
- Namesake: Tsezar Kunikov
- Builder: Stocznia Północna, Gdańsk, Poland
- Commissioned: 30 October 1986
- Home port: Sevastopol
- Fate: Sunk on 14 February 2024

General characteristics
- Class & type: Ropucha-class landing ship
- Displacement: 2,768 long tons (2,812 t) standard; 4,012 long tons (4,076 t) full load
- Length: 112.5 m (369 ft 1 in)
- Beam: 15.01 m (49 ft 3 in)
- Draught: 4.26 m (14 ft 0 in)
- Ramps: Over bows and at stern
- Installed power: 3 × 750 kW (1,006 hp) diesel generators
- Propulsion: 2 × 9,600 hp (7,159 kW) Zgoda-Sulzer 16ZVB40/48 diesel engines
- Speed: 17.59 knots (32.58 km/h; 20.24 mph)
- Range: 6,000 nmi (11,000 km; 6,900 mi) at 12 knots (22 km/h; 14 mph); 3,500 nmi (6,500 km; 4,000 mi) at 16 knots (30 km/h; 18 mph)
- Endurance: 30 days
- Capacity: 10 × main battle tanks and 340 troops or 12 × BTR APC and 340 troops or 3 × main battle tanks, 3 × 2S9 Nona-S SPG, 5 × MT-LB APC, 4 trucks and 313 troops or 500 tons of cargo
- Complement: 98
- Armament: 2 × AK-725 twin 57 mm (2.2 in) DP guns; 4 × 8 Strela 2 SAM launchers; 2 × 22 A-215 Grad-M rocket launchers

Service record
- Part of: Black Sea Fleet; 197th Landing Ship Brigade

Tsezar Kunikov (BDK-64) (Russian: «Цезарь Куников» (БДК-64); NATO reporting name: Ropucha-I class), sometimes anglicised as Caesar Kunikov, was a Project 775, large landing ship of the Russian Navy. The ship was built in Polish People's Republic, launched in 1986 and named after Soviet Naval Infantry officer Tsezar Kunikov. As part of the Russian Black Sea Fleet, it took part in the KFOR mission, the Russo-Georgian War, the Syrian Civil War, and the Russo-Ukrainian War.

On 14 February 2024, the Ukrainian military announced its forces had hit the ship with several unmanned surface vehicles (USV) while it was off Crimea, which they say caused it to sink. The sinking of the ship has been confirmed by Russian sources.

== Description ==
The ship can house a crew of 87 (89 according to one source) and had improved defensive armament. During the Russo-Ukrainian War it was claimed to have been used to transport ammunition.

== Service history ==
The ship was built at the Stocznia Północna shipyard in Gdańsk, Poland, and launched on 30 October 1986. It is named after Tsezar Kunikov, a Soviet naval infantry officer.

She was in service with the Black Sea Fleet's 197th Landing Ship Brigade of the 30th Division of Surface Ships, and her home port is Sevastopol. She has been under the patronage of the city of Zelenograd (since 1998) and Chelyabinsk Oblast (since 2011).

The ship took part in several conflicts on behalf of the Russian Navy. In 1999 she and three other Black Sea Fleet landing ships were used for deployment of the Russian contingent on the KFOR mission in Kosovo. The ship took part in the Russo-Georgian conflict in 2008. In 2012 the landing craft was sent to the Russian military base at Tartus, Syria with a contingent of marines to protect the base. In October 2015, Tsezar Kunikov was sent to Syria with a cargo of weapons and ammunition for the Syrian Arab Army.

=== Russo-Ukrainian War ===
==== 2022 ====
On 24 March 2022 the General Staff of the Ukrainian Armed Forces reported that Tsezar Kunikov and her sister ship Novocherkassk had been damaged during an attack that destroyed the Tapir-class landing ship Saratov in the port of Berdiansk during the 2022 Russian invasion of Ukraine. Video of the incident showed the Tsezar Kunikov and Novocherkassk retreating from the port soon after the attack; one of the ships' forecastles was on fire, although it is unclear which.

On 18 April 2022 it was reported that the ship's commander, Captain 3rd rank Alexander Chirva, died during the invasion of Ukraine.

On 24 August 2022 it was reported that Tsezar Kunikov and Novocherkassk were out of action due to lack of spare parts to repair the ships. The lack of spare parts was attributed to the sanctions imposed on Russia. According to Ukrainian spokespersons, the ship was later used to transport ammunition.

==== 2024 ====
Main Directorate of Intelligence footage of the attack on Tsezar Kunikov by Group 13.

On 14 February 2024, Ukrainian Armed Forces released a statement through Telegram that they had attacked the Tsezar Kunikov using MAGURA V5 unmanned surface vehicles (USVs) while the ship was off Alupka in Crimea. Loud explosions were reportedly in the region, according to posts on social media. The attack was carried out by the special forces unit "Group 13", which also carried out the 1 February attack on the Russian missile boat Ivanovets. In the statement, the Main Directorate of Intelligence of Ukraine said, "Tsezar Kunikov received a critical breach on the port side and started sinking." The General Staff of the Ukrainian Armed Forces said that Russian rescue operations were not successful and that they believe most of the crew of 87 did not survive.

Ukraine later released grainy and edited video of the attack, showing the ship being attacked by USVs and receiving damage. Analyzing the video, BBC Verify was able to verify the ship on the video was a Ropucha-class landing ship; Reuters was able to identify the ship in the video as the Tsezar Kunikov but could not verify the date or location of the video. According to the Associated Press, the private intelligence firm Ambrey concluded that the video showed the ship being attacked by three USVs, and that the ship probably sank after listing to its side. There was no additional confirmation of Ukrainian claims relating to the attack. Ukraine said that the Tsezar Kunikov was the 25th Russian ship it had disabled. Kyrylo Budanov later explained that, initially, Tsezar Kunikov was not the intended target of the 14 February strike; however due to changing conditions after the mission's commencement which prevented the original target from being struck, it was decided to change targets and attack Tsezar Kunikov instead.

Neither the Russian military nor Kremlin spokesperson Dmitry Peskov responded to requests to comment. However, the Russian Defense Ministry said it had recently destroyed six unmanned surface vehicles (USV) in the Black Sea. A former sailor on the Tsezar Kunikov interviewed by BBC said that the entire crew of 89 had managed to evacuate the sinking ship. According to a Ukrainian source which published a video purporting to show the engagement viewed from on board the ship, the strike on the ship and its subsequent evacuation has been confirmed by Russian sources.

== See also ==
- List of ship losses during the Russo-Ukrainian War
