= Sinking of the Moskva =

2022 sinking of Russian warship Moskva

Sinking of Moskva
- Part of Snake Island campaign of the Russo-Ukrainian war (2022–present)
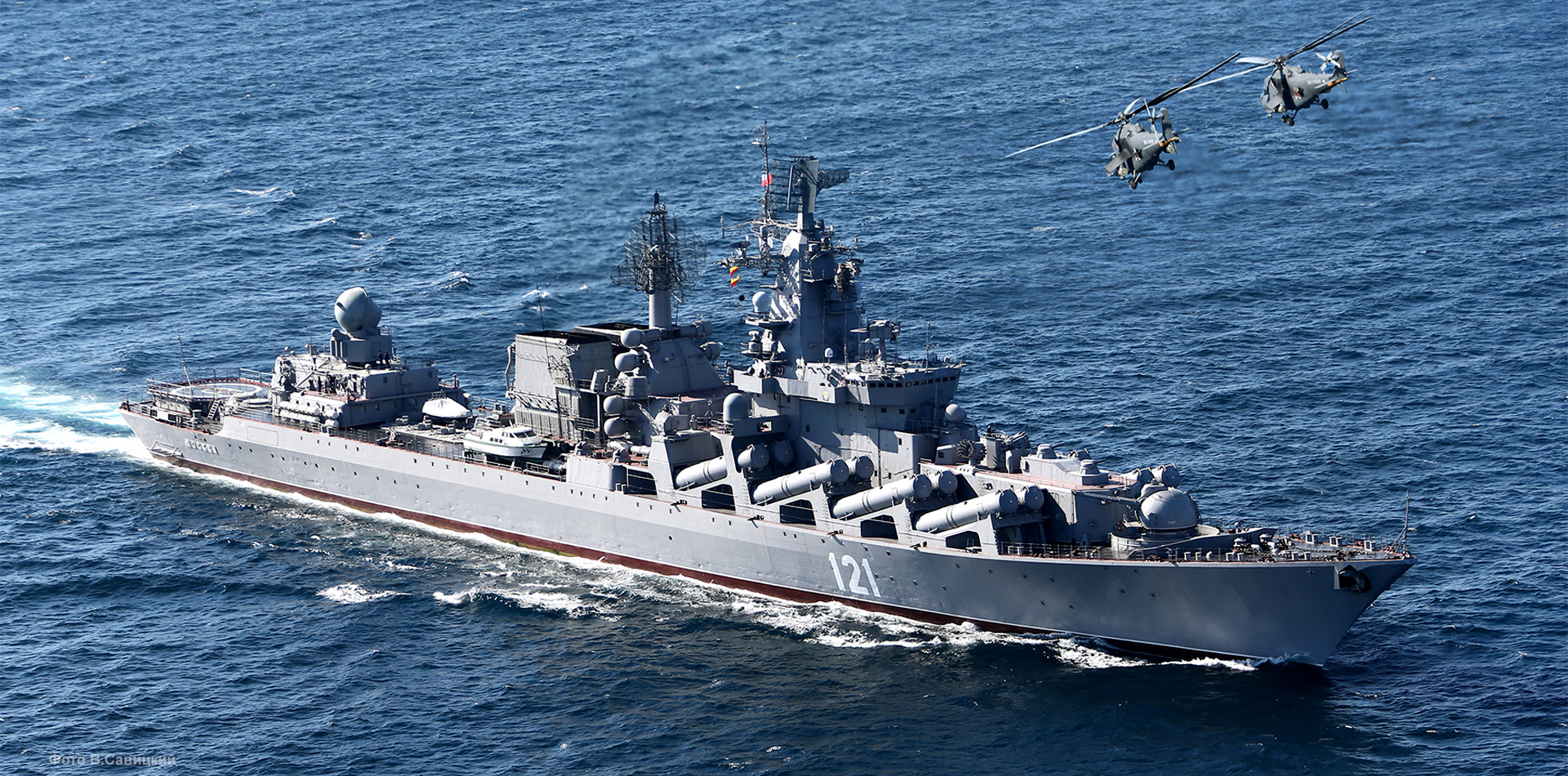
- Moskva seen from the air in 2012
- Date: 14 April 2022; 4 years ago
- Location: East of Snake Island, Black Sea; 45°10′43″N 30°55′31″E
- Cause: Hit by two R-360 Neptune anti-ship missiles leading to a fire which caused ammunitions to explode
- Participants: Russian Navy; Armed Forces of Ukraine
- Deaths: 300 killed (per Business Insider); 37 killed (per Meduza); 40 killed (per Novaya Gazeta Europe); ~240 killed (per Naval News); 20 killed (per Russia); ~452 killed (per Ukraine)
- Injuries: 200 injured (per Business Insider); 100 wounded (per Meduza); 24 wounded (per Russia)
- Missing: 8 missing (per Russia)

The Russian warship Moskva, the flagship of the Russian Navy's Black Sea Fleet, was attacked and sunk by Ukrainian forces on 14 April 2022 during the Russo-Ukrainian war. Ukrainian officials announced that their forces had hit and damaged it with two R-360 Neptune anti-ship missiles, and that the ship had then caught fire. The United States Department of Defense later confirmed this, and Russia reported that the ship had sunk in stormy seas after the fire reached ammunition on board that exploded.

The cruiser is the largest Russian warship to be sunk in wartime since the end of World War II, and the second Russian flagship sunk after Knyaz Suvorov in 1905, during the Russo-Japanese War.

Russia said that 396 crew members had been evacuated, with one sailor killed and 27 missing, but there are unverified reports of more casualties. At least 17 of the missing crew members were later declared dead by a court in Sevastopol.

== Background ==
In February 2022, the Moskva left the Port of Sevastopol to participate in the Russian invasion of Ukraine. The ship was later used against the Ukrainian armed forces during the attack on Snake Island, together with the Russian patrol boat Vasily Bykov. Moskva hailed the island's garrison over the radio and demanded its surrender, receiving the now-famous reply "Russian warship, go fuck yourself" from its garrison. After this, contact was lost with Snake Island, and the thirteen-member Ukrainian garrison surrendered. The ship continued to be deployed in the Black Sea until its sinking in April 2022.

== Sinking ==
Location of Moskva in Black Sea on 12 April 2022 by satellite imagery

=== Ukrainian account ===
The first known report of a missile hitting the ship was at 20:42, 13 April 2022, Ukrainian time (EEST, UTC+03:00) with a Facebook post by a Ukrainian volunteer connected to the military: "The cruiser Moskva has just been hit by 2 Neptune missiles. It is standing [not sunk], burning. And there is a storm at sea. Tactical flooding is required, apparently." Later that evening presidential adviser Oleksiy Arestovych reported Moskva was on fire in rough seas and Odesa governor Maksym Marchenko officially confirmed that Ukrainian forces hit Moskva with two R-360 Neptune anti-ship missiles, which "caused very serious damage." At 12:43, 14 April EEST, the Ukrainian Southern Command posted a video on Facebook with a report stating the ship had received damage within the range of the Neptune anti-ship missile and that there was a fire on board. The video also claimed that other vessels in Moskva's group "tried to help, but a storm and a powerful explosion of ammunition overturned the cruiser, and it began to sink."

=== Russian account ===
Hours after Marchenko's claim, the Russian Ministry of Defence said that a fire had caused ammunition to explode and that the ship had been seriously damaged, without any statement of cause or reference to a Ukrainian strike. The ministry said on 14 April that the missile systems of the cruiser were undamaged, the fire had been contained by sailors, and that efforts were underway to tow the ship to port. Later on 14 April, the Russian ministry said that Moskva had sunk while being towed during stormy weather. On 15 April, the sinking was briefly reported on Russian news media and television, where it was said to have been due to "stormy seas."

=== Other early observations ===
The United States Department of Defense spokesman John Kirby said early on 14 April that they did not have enough information to confirm a missile strike, but could not rule it out. Imagery they had examined showed the ship had suffered a sizable explosion. The cause of the explosion was not clear. The ship appeared to be moving under its own power, probably heading to Sevastopol for repairs. A defense department spokesman later stated it was unclear whether the vessel was moving under her own power or being towed. A senior Defense Department official, who spoke on condition of anonymity, stated the ship was "battling a fire on board, but we do not know the extent of the damage,” but it was "big" and "extensive."

An image from a satellite with cloud-penetrating synthetic aperture radar (SAR) revealed that at 18:52 local time (UTC+03:00) on 13 April 2022, Moskva was located at 45°10′43.39″N 30°55′30.54″E, about 80 nautical miles (150 km) south of Odesa, east of Snake Island, and around 50 nmi (90 km) from the Ukrainian coast. An analysis suggested this was not long after the damage occurred, which caused the ship to eventually sink. In the image, the cruiser is accompanied by other vessels.

At 02:59, 14 April 2022 [EEST], the Telegram channel Reverse Side of the Medal, associated with the Russian paramilitary Wagner Group, posted the following: "According to unconfirmed reports," the flagship of the Black Sea Fleet, the cruiser Moskva, sank. The group added that, according to their "preliminary information," [the ship] was indeed attacked by the Neptune anti-ship missiles from the coastline between Odesa and Nikolaev. The channel reported that "the forces of the ship were diverted to counter the Bayraktar TB-2 UAV. The blow fell on the port side, as a result of which the ship took a strong roll. After the threat of detonation of ammunition, the crew of about 500 people was evacuated."

At 10:59, 14 April 2022 [EEST], the Lithuanian defence minister, Arvydas Anušauskas, reported on Facebook that an SOS signal was sent at 01:05, the cruiser rolled onto its side at 01:14, and the electricity went out half an hour later. "From 2 a.m., a Turkish ship evacuated 54 sailors from the cruiser, and at about 3 a.m., Turkey and Romania reported that the ship was completely sunk." According to the Albanian website Politiko, a Turkish official denied to BBC News that a Turkish ship rescued any Russian crew.

In the afternoon of 14 April, US Defense Department spokesman Kirby confirmed the ship had sunk but said they were unable to confirm what caused the ship to sink, although the Ukrainian account was "certainly plausible." Speculating about the cause of the explosion, he stated: "Certainly, it could have been damage from some external force, like a missile or an attack of some kind, a torpedo, or something like that... but it could also be something that happens inside the skin of the ship –an engineering fire, a fuel fire. You just don't know."

=== Missile strike ===
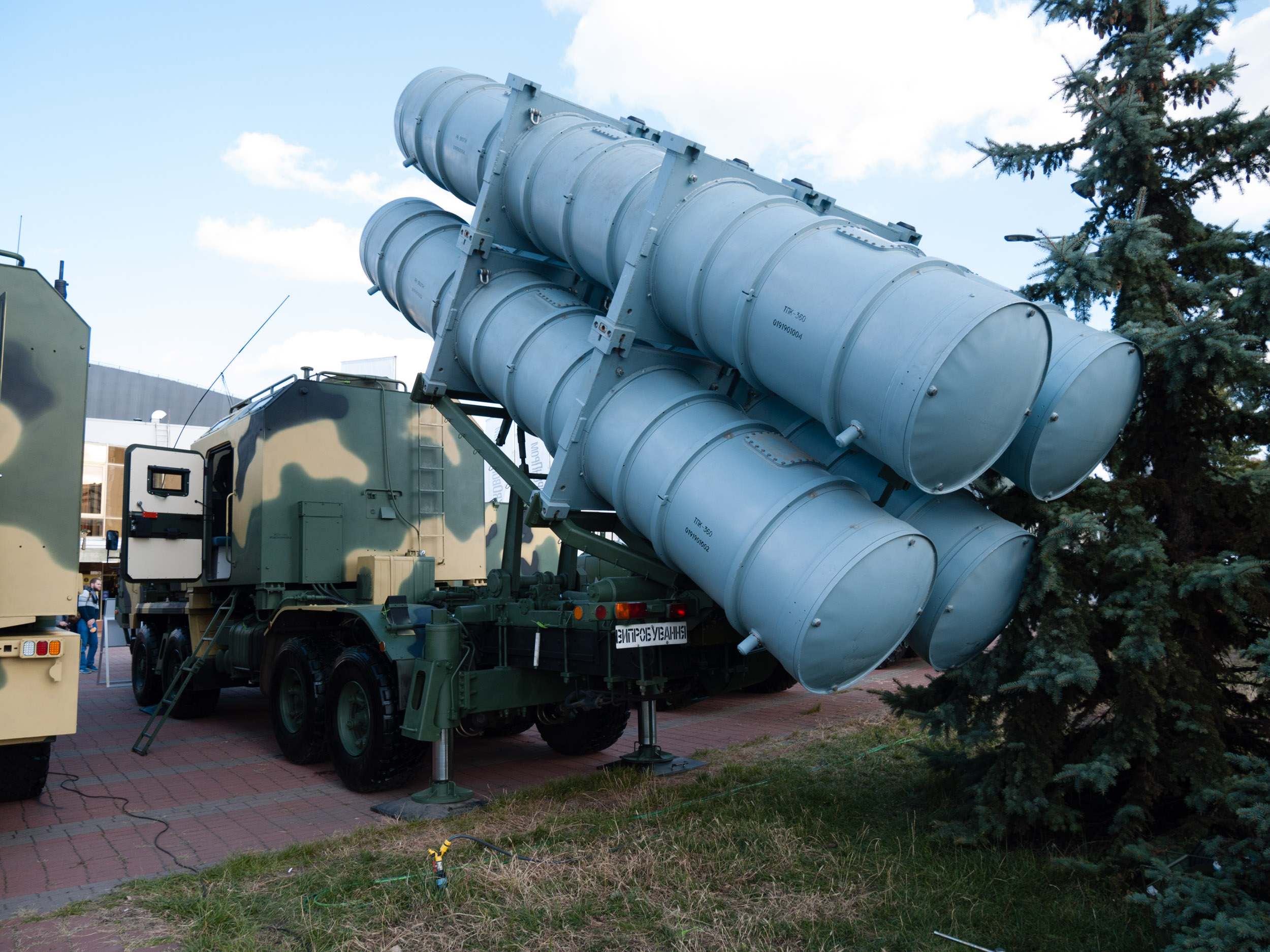
An R-360 Neptune launcher near Kyiv in 2019

On 15 April, a senior US defense official said that Moskva had been hit by two Neptune missiles; he also stated that the ship was about 65 nmi (120 km) south of Odesa when she was struck and that the cruiser continued onward under her own power before sinking on 14 April. The official also said intelligence appraisals indicated there were casualties at the time of the strike, but he did not know how many. The Ukrainian missiles were apparently fired from a land-based launcher near Odesa while Moskva was located 60–65 nautical miles (110–120 kilometres) offshore.

On 5 May, a US official said that the US gave "a range of intelligence" to assist in the sinking of the Moskva. However, the decision to strike was purely a Ukrainian one. There was a US Navy P-8A Poseidon maritime surveillance aircraft in the area before the sinking. The P-8A from Italy was patrolling within its radar range over the Black Sea and the US, when asked, did identify the ship as the Moskva as part of intelligence sharing to help Ukraine defend against attacks from Russian ships. The US Department of Defense spokesman John Kirby stated: "There was no provision of targeting information by any United States Navy P-8 flying in these air policing missions."

The Moskva was equipped with a triple-tiered air defence that could have provided an adequate chance of intercepting the incoming Neptune missiles, with 3–4 minutes of radar detection warning. There was no record that the crew had activated these systems, including the S-300F and 9K33 Osa surface-to-air missiles, chaff or decoys, electronic jamming, or the last-ditch AK-630 close-in weapon systems. Tayfun Ozberk, a Turkey correspondent for Defense News, suggested that the ship's radars either failed to detect the incoming Neptune missiles or that the defenses were not ready to engage the detected threat, implying a lack of crew training for such emergency scenarios.

The operation to sink Moskva may have been assisted by the use of at least one Bayraktar TB2 drone (UCAV), which seems to have observed the event and may have played other roles in the ship's sinking. The Telegram post by the Wagner Group and a Ukrainian official said the drone "diverted" or "distracted" the crew, but David Hambling, a technology journalist writing in Forbes, considered this unlikely, since the ship's anti-drone and anti-missile defenses were provided by two different systems: the long-range SA-N-6 Grumble (S-300F) missiles against the drone and the multibarreled AK-630 cannons against the Neptune missiles.

Several reports were consistent with Bayraktar drones being in the same area as the ship. Arda Mevlutoglu, a defence industry analyst, stated that a Bayraktar TB2 ground-control station was seen in Odesa on 10 April. A video released by the Russian military on 12 April showed a missile being launched from the Russian frigate Admiral Essen and stated it destroyed a Bayraktar drone near the Crimean coast. A Ukrainian video "shot from the air with a night vision scope," claimed to show Moskva burning in the distance, and could have been made by a Bayraktar drone flying in the area.

Analysts stated the Bayraktar drone may have also provided targeting information. Can Kasapoglu, the director of security and defence studies at the Turkish think tank Center for the Economics and Foreign Policy Studies (EDAM), said: "Reports that Turkish TB2 drones were involved in the attack either as a distraction for Moskva or as location spotters of Moskva are both quite possible." Mevlutoglu mentioned that Rear Admiral Oleksiy Neizhpapa, commander of the Ukrainian naval forces, had in the past suggested that TB2 drones would be used with Neptune launchers for target reconnaissance. Mevlutoglu also said the main radar system on Moskva was out of date, designed to detect aircraft and cruise missiles. The TB2, with a lower radar cross-section and flight speed, may have been missed by the ship's radar.

The aviation journalist Valius Venckunas reported: "According to Arkady Babchenko, a Russian military journalist and an outspoken critic of Vladimir Putin, a Ukrainian Bayraktar disabled Moskva's radar station, rendering it unable to detect and intercept incoming missiles. However, Babchenko has not provided the source of such information."

Danish military analyst Anders Puck Nielsen suggested that operator fatigue could have been a significant factor: Russian ships rely on rather old-fashioned systems that work well, but require operators who are alert and responsive. With defensive systems active, the cruiser would be expected to survive several strikes from Neptune missiles with their 150 kg or 320 lb warheads due to its large displacement. One salvo combat model scenario suggests that at least eleven Neptune missiles would have needed to attack simultaneously; Moskva could have defeated six of them, with the remaining five getting through its defences and causing just enough hull damage to sink it. However, this assumes good damage control to prevent ship munitions from being detonated; the use of conscripts instead of mid-grade professionals and insufficient compartmentation have been suggested as contributing to the cruiser's sinking.

=== Images and video of the sinking ship ===
By 18 April 2022, two images and a short 3-second video clip were circulating on social media showing Moskva before sinking after the fire broke out. The images show the ship listing to port in daylight and calm seas, with signs of extensive fire damage around the central superstructure and holes at the waterline, and most of her life rafts missing, indicating that some of the crew had evacuated. According to CNN, "a large Russian rescue tug can be seen dousing the warship with water on the far [starboard] side."

Comparison of the Moskva before and after the incident

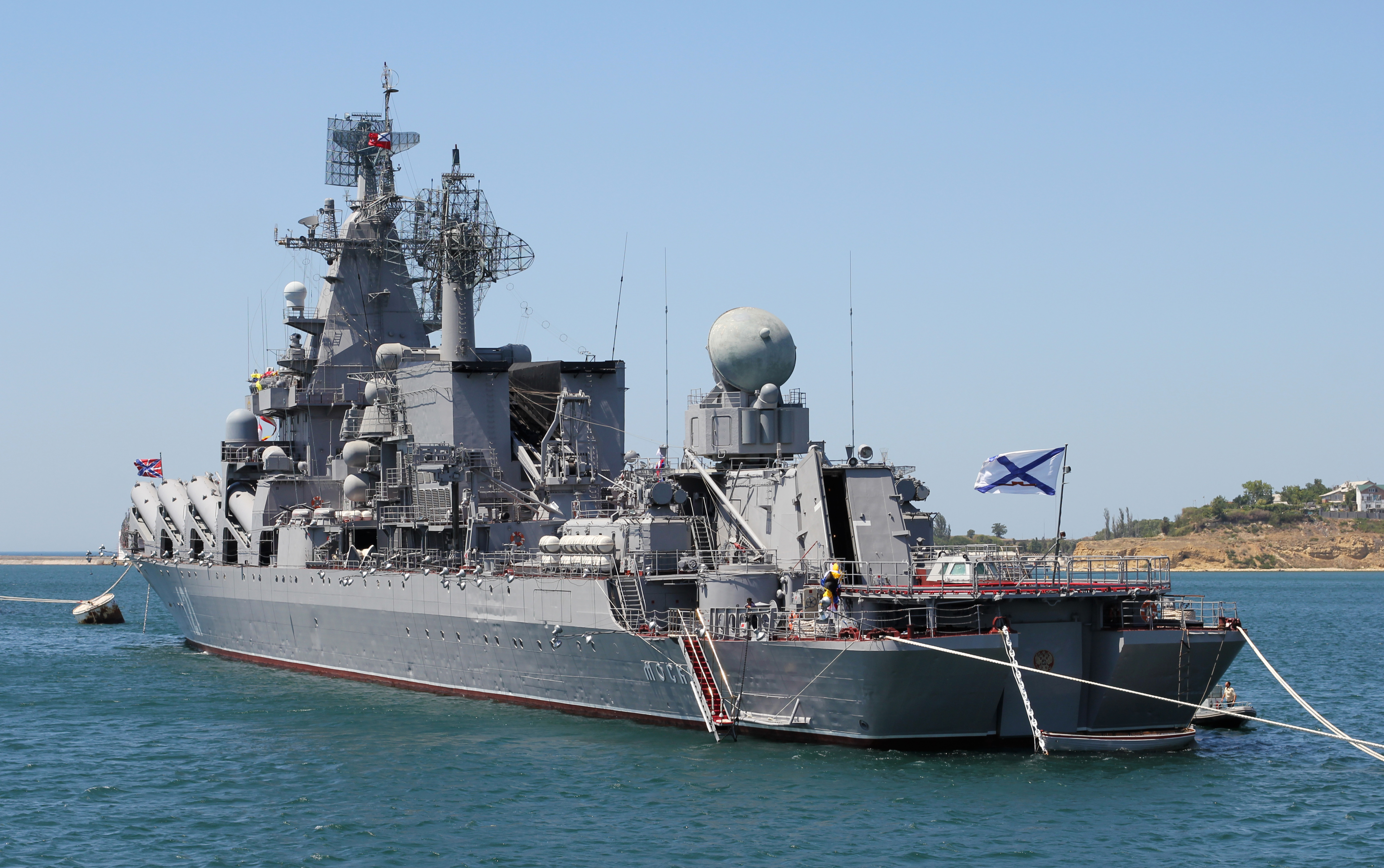
Moskva moored in Sevastopol Bay in 2012

An image of Moskva, purportedly on fire and listing following the incident. This image is one of the few physical confirmations of the nature of the ship's damage, and is the primary source of open-source internet reports

The source or author of the video or images is unknown. The Telegraph reported the images were first posted to the web via the Telegram messaging service on a channel linked to Russian security agencies. Analysts who were independently consulted by The Guardian and CNN confirmed that the images appear to show Moskva. The Guardian quoted Yörük Işık, a journalist and expert ship spotter, as saying: "I believe the video is real. What we see shape, size. It is the Moskva." The Guardian also reported: "He [Işık] said he believed at least one of the photographs was taken from a Project 22870 rescue tugship, of which Russia is believed to have two in the Black Sea."

A senior US defense official said the images could not be independently verified, "but the images themselves comport with what we had assessed to be the damage done to the ship." Carl Schuster, former director of operations at the US Pacific Command's Joint Intelligence Operations Center, stated: "Assuming the photo is not faked in some way or Photoshopped, it looks like the missile(s) hit forward, which is not unexpected. Anti-ship cruise missiles (ASCMs) tend to go for the center of the radar return, which typically is the forward section of the superstructure." Chris Parry, a former rear admiral, wrote to The Guardian: "It seems that one–two missiles entered the ship just below the aft pair of Vulcan anti-ship missiles ... This would have caused massive internal damage and looks to have punctured the two missiles ... which would have drained down propellant fuel that further intensified the fire within the ship by spreading horizontally along the decks and through the damaged bulkheads." Naval experts consulted by the BBC considered the damage to be consistent with a missile attack but disagreed about the plausibility of other causes. The video shows no sign of the storm stated in Russian reports.

== Casualties ==
Lithuania's defence minister, Arvydas Anušauskas, said on 14 April that a distress signal had been sent from Moskva that day, and a Turkish ship responded, evacuating 54 personnel from the cruiser at 2 am, before she sank at 3 am. According to him, there were 485 crew on board, of whom 66 were officers. It was not known how many had survived.

Ukrainian sources reported on 15 April that some of Moskva's crew were killed, including First Rank Captain (NATO OF-5, US O-6) Anton Kuprin (age 43), the ship's commanding officer, at the time of the explosion. On 15 April, a senior US official said the government also believed there had been casualties. At a US Department of Defense briefing on 18 April, a senior defense official revealed they had also seen lifeboats in the water with sailors in them but did not have an accurate count. The independent Russian newspaper Novaya Gazeta Europe reported some 40 sailors had been killed at the time of the sinking. According to an eyewitness, there were some 200 injured sailors in a hospital in Crimea, out of an estimated 500 crewmembers from the ship. The report also said that the remaining sailors remained unaccounted for.

The Russian Ministry of Defence said soon after the sinking that the crew had been evacuated and initially did not report any casualties; however, some relatives of sailors have been told that their family member was "missing." On 16 April, Russia released a video allegedly showing a meeting in Sevastopol with around 100 sailors of Moskva, along with Navy Commander-in-Chief Admiral Nikolay Yevmenov, who said that the sailors would continue their service in the Navy.

According to independent Russian online newspaper The Insider, about 100 sailors, and notably the first-rank captain of the ship, Anton Kuprin, are visible in the video. Naval News reported that the Russian Defense Ministry video showed around 240 people survived, which is roughly half the crew. The Ukrainian edition of Radio Liberty, however, says that it is impossible to verify the authenticity of the video.

On 22 April, the Russian Defence Ministry released a statement confirming that one sailor from Moskva was killed and 27 were missing, while 396 crew members were rescued. Family members of crew serving aboard the Moskva allege that the number of missing sailors could be higher and that they have received no official information regarding their fate. At least 17 of the missing crew members were later declared dead by a court in Sevastopol. However, on 22 April 2022, Oleksiy Danilov, secretary of the National Security and Defence Council of Ukraine, claimed that out of a complement of 510 crew members, only 58 had been rescued.

== Impact ==
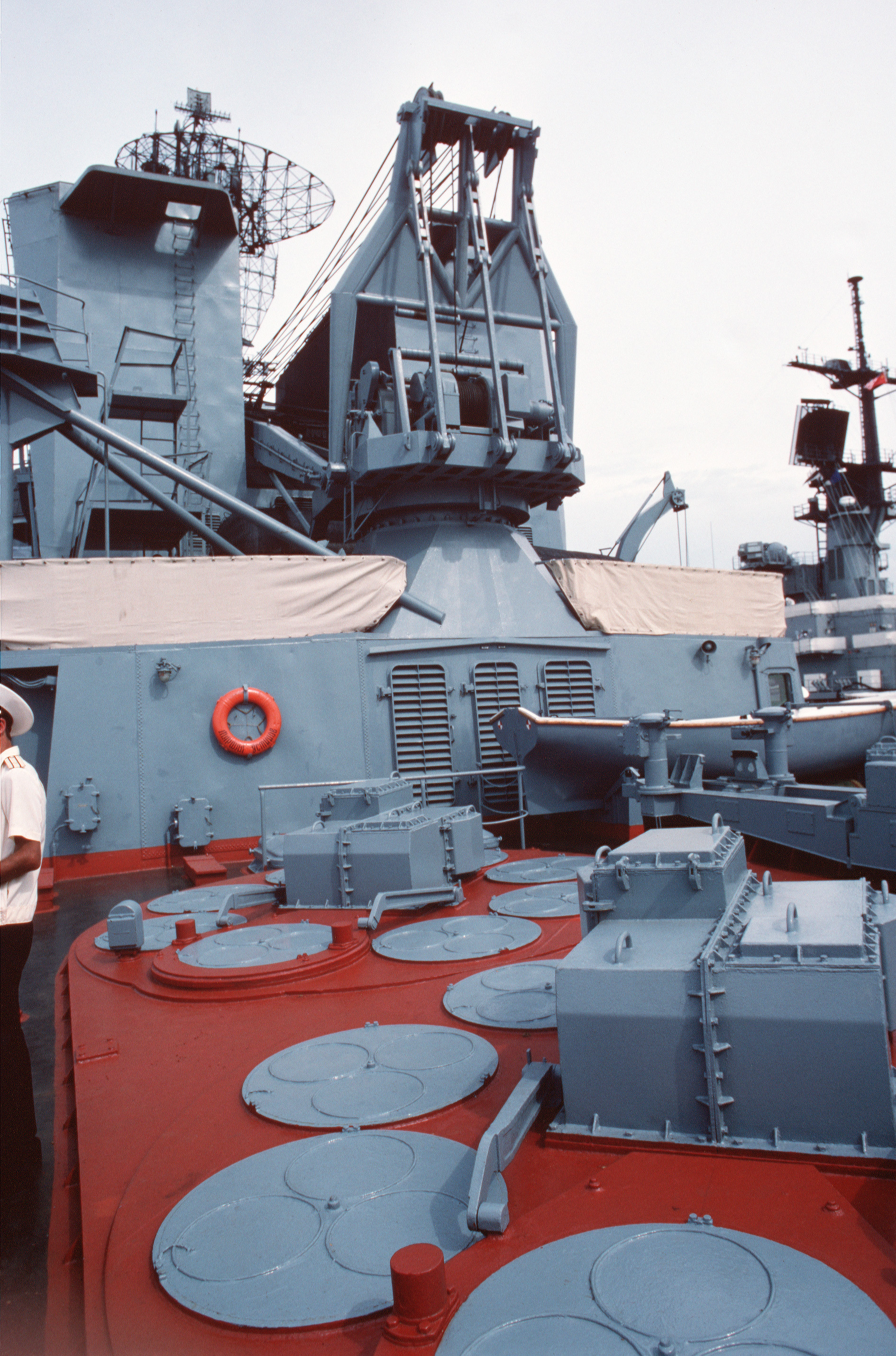
S-300F (SA-N-6) missile launchers on a Slava-class cruiser

Moskva is the largest Soviet or Russian warship to be sunk in action since World War II, when German aircraft bombs sank the Soviet battleship Marat, and the first loss of a Russian flagship in wartime since the 1905 sinking of the battleship Knyaz Suvorov during the Battle of Tsushima in the Russo-Japanese War. The last time a warship of comparable size was sunk was during the Falklands War in 1982, when the Argentine Navy cruiser ARA General Belgrano was sunk by the Royal Navy submarine HMS Conqueror. If Ukrainian claims are true, Moskva might be the largest warship ever disabled or destroyed by a missile, according to Carl Schuster, a retired US Navy captain and former director of operations at the US Pacific Command's Joint Intelligence Center.

The loss of Moskva is considered significant and humiliating to Russian president Vladimir Putin, but is "more about psychological damage than material damage," according to Mykola Bielieskov from Ukraine's National Institute for Strategic Studies, who said that it would not completely lift Russia's naval blockade on Ukraine, but showed that Ukraine could employ sophisticated weaponry effectively. The Institute for the Study of War reached similar conclusions and said the loss of the ship might force Russia "to either deploy additional air and point-defence assets to the Black Sea battlegroup or withdraw vessels from positions near the Ukrainian coast." Russia moved five other warships further away from the Ukrainian coast.

Moskva was the only warship in Russia's Black Sea Fleet with the S-300F missile system for long-range air defence. The ship did not itself fire missiles at land targets in Ukraine but provided anti-aircraft support to vessels that did; the sinking prompted Russian ships, now less protected, to move further offshore. Retired US Rear Admiral Samuel J. Cox, director of the Naval History and Heritage Command, told The New York Times that with the loss of the ship "any amphibious assault on Ukraine would be much more dangerous for Russia, with its landing and amphibious ships much more vulnerable to attacks."

In June 2022, Russian Vasily Bykov-class corvettes were spotted fitted with ground-based Tor-M1/2 anti-air missile systems on deck; analysts speculated that the arrangement was to compensate for the loss of seaborne air defence following the loss of the Moskva. Also in June, some of Russia's many gas platforms were attacked due to decreased area protection, about halfway between Crimea and occupied Snake Island. By August, the Russian Navy's ability to control the Black Sea had decreased as Odesa was no longer threatened from sea. However, the Russian Navy maintained the ability to protect Russian exports crossing the sea.

While two sister ships of Moskva were deployed to the Eastern Mediterranean as of February 2022, Turkey closed the Turkish Straits to belligerent warships whose home port is not in the Black Sea for the duration of the war, following the Montreux Convention; consequently, Russia cannot send ships to replace the lost Moskva from its other fleet bases without violating Turkish sovereignty.

In 2020, the archpriest of the Russian Orthodox Church Sevastopol District said that a fragment of the True Cross (a very rare relic important to many Christians who believe that it is the cross on which Jesus was crucified) would be kept in Moskva's chapel. There was speculation after her sinking that the relic may have gone down with the ship.

== Aftermath ==
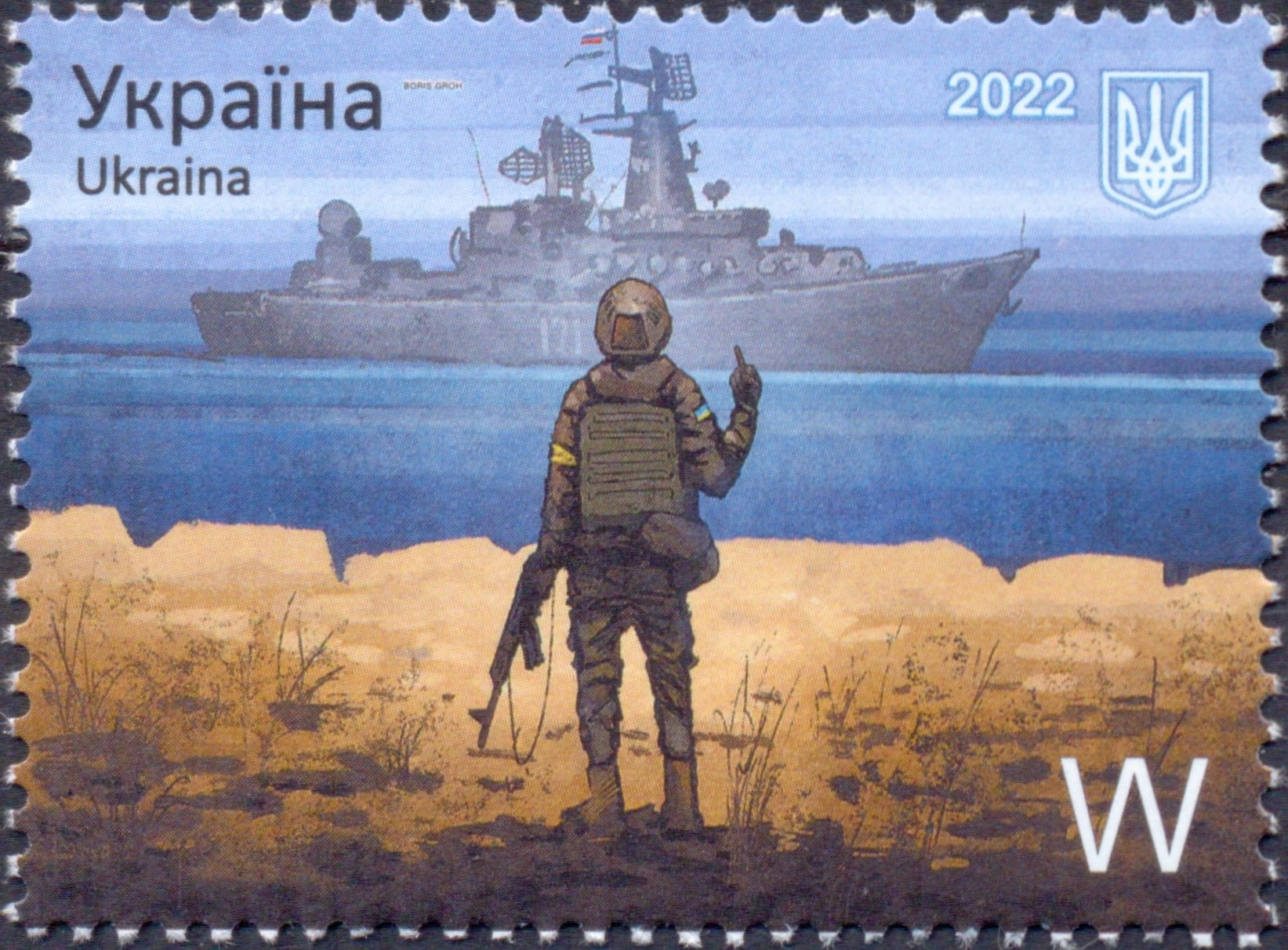
Ukrainian postage stamp, depicting a Ukrainian soldier giving Russian cruiser Moskva the finger, issued two days before she sank

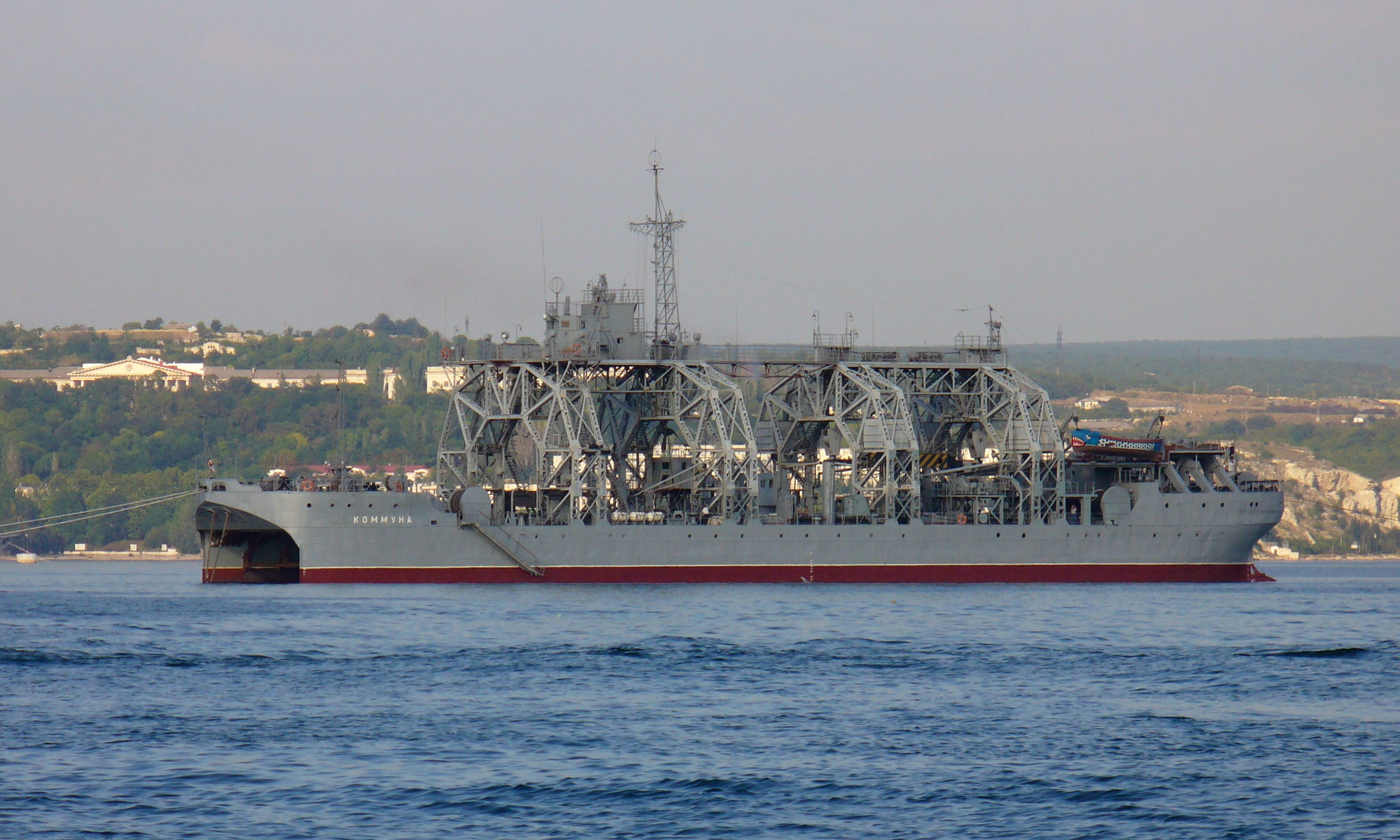
Russian salvage ship Kommuna

United States National Security Adviser Jake Sullivan said that the sinking of Moskva "is a big blow to Russia," with Moscow split between a narrative of incompetence and one of having been attacked. Sasaki Takahiro, guest professor on Russian security policy at Hiroshima University, said in The Asahi Shimbun that the sinking of Moskva is comparable with that of Yamato, a major battleship of Imperial Japan. US Defense Department spokesman John Kirby said that Moskva's main mission was air defence for the Russian forces in the Black Sea and that her sinking "will have an impact on that capability, certainly in the near term."

According to an analysis by Forbes Ukraine, Moskva would cost around US$750 million to replace, making her sinking the most costly single loss for the Russian military in the war at the time. Although Russia did not confirm that Ukrainian missiles had hit the ship, Reuters reported that in the morning of 15 April, Russia launched an apparent retaliatory missile strike against the missile factory Luch Design Bureau in Kyiv, where the Neptune missiles reportedly used in the attack were designed and manufactured.

The sinking of Moskva came two days after Ukrposhta released one million "Russian warship, go fuck yourself" stamps, showing a soldier giving the finger to Moskva. The sinking boosted sales of the stamp in Ukraine; some people queued for more than two hours to buy it. The sinking of Moskva probably boosted Ukrainian and depressed Russian morale. Oleksiy Neizhpapa, the commander of Ukrainian naval forces, was promoted following the sinking of Moskva.

Russian TV media only discussed the story briefly; news articles described out-of-date fire-suppression systems and said that the sinking would not have an effect on the Russian operation. However, film director and former State Duma member Vladimir Bortko, speaking as a guest on a talk show, urged retaliation in the form of total war, saying that the fate of Moskva "is absolutely a cause for war...[a] real war, no fooling around." On 18 April, Russia-1 state TV presenter Vladimir Solovyov criticised the Russian navy over the sinking. Russian commentator Sergei Markov, a strong Kremlin supporter, told BBC Radio 4's The World at One that the cruiser had been struck by missiles shipped from Norway and that her electronic defences had been neutralised by the US. The Russian tabloid Komsomolskaya Pravda speculated that the ship had been hit by a Norwegian AGM-119 Penguin missile.

A Ukraine-based publication and two defence analysts wrote in the aftermath that Moskva had the capability to carry nuclear warheads, and may have been carrying two at the time of her sinking. They called for neighboring nations to launch an investigation into the possibility of a nuclear accident. There is a slight chance, but no evidence, that the cruiser was carrying nuclear warheads for her P-500/P-1000 anti-ship missiles. A senior U.S. defense official said that there were no nuclear weapons on the ship when she sank.

Ukraine declared the wreck of Moskva as having "underwater cultural heritage." It is being advertised as a dive wreck, as it is only 130 km off the coast from Odesa and the water is only 45–50 metres deep. The wreck "can be admired without much diving."

The Russian navy was reported to have sent the salvage ship Kommuna (commissioned in 1915, the oldest naval ship still in active duty anywhere) with the AS-28 submersible on board to the wreck, as part of an eight-ship convoy. Due to the size of Moskva, which sank in one piece, bringing her to the surface is thought to be impractical; the aim is likely to recover encryption material, weapons, bodies, and other sensitive material that foreign powers might be interested in. Kommuna is based with the Black Sea Fleet and sails from Sevastopol; her presence at the wreck site would expose her to Ukrainian attack. On 24 May, Ukrainian sources said that Russia had spent the previous two weeks removing bodies and classified equipment from the wreck of the Moskva, with five to seven ships involved.

On 30 June, Russia retreated from Snake Island, the island that Moskva had attacked together with Vasily Bykov. The Ukrainian military landed on Snake Island on 4 July and raised the Ukrainian flag.

On 4 November, a Sevastopol court declared 17 of the missing sailors of the Moskva dead.

On 22 January 2026, in Moscow, the Second Western District Military Court formally acknowledged that the Russian cruiser Moskva was sunk by a Ukrainian missile. Andrii Shubin, then commander of the 406th Artillery Brigade of the Ukrainian Navy, was declared to have given the orders that led to the sinking of the cruiser Moskva. The Court found that "Twenty crew members of the cruiser died from the explosion, fire, and smoke; twenty-four crew members suffered bodily injuries of varying severity; and eight went missing, including during the six-hour-long efforts to save the ship," the court press release stated that Shubin was also accused of destroying the frigate Admiral Essen on 2 April 2022.

== See also ==
- Spasatel Vasily Bekh – Russian Navy tug sunk by Ukraine during the 2022 invasion
- List of ship losses during the Russo-Ukrainian War
- Battle of the Denmark Strait – sinking of British battlecruiser HMS Hood
- Operation Kikusui I – sinking of Japanese battleship Yamato
- Last battle of Bismarck – sinking of German battleship Bismarck
