= List of ship commissionings in 2017 =

The list of ship commissionings in 2017 includes a chronological list of all ships commissioned in 2017.

	Operator	Ship	Class and type	Pennant	Other notes
16 January	Russian Navy	Vasily Bekh	Project 22870 rescue tug	SB-739	Sunk during 2022 Russian invasion of Ukraine
7 April	Indonesian Navy	Raden Eddy Martadinata	Martadinata-class frigate	331	For Indonesian Navy
20 April	Italian Navy	Luigi Rizzo	Bergamini-class frigate	F 595	For Italian Navy
24 May	Algerian National Navy	El Moudamir	Erradii-class frigate	911	For Algerian Navy
31 May	Philippine Navy	Davao del Sur	Tarlac-class landing platform dock	LD-602	For Philippine Navy
4 July	French Navy	Languedoc	Aquitaine-class frigate	D653	For French Navy
22 July	United States Navy	Gerald R. Ford	Gerald R. Ford-class aircraft carrier	CVN-78	
23 September	Royal Australian Navy	Hobart	Hobart-class air warfare destroyer	DDG 39	For Royal Australian Navy
27 November	(United Kingdom) Royal Fleet Auxiliary	Tidespring	Tide-class replenishment tanker	A136	For Royal Fleet Auxiliary
5 December	Islamic Republic of Iran Navy	Separ	Sina-class fast attack craft	P234	For Islamic Republic of Iran Navy
7 December	Royal Navy	Queen Elizabeth	Queen Elizabeth-class aircraft carrier	R08	For Royal Navy
