= Project 22160 patrol ship =

Russian patrol ship

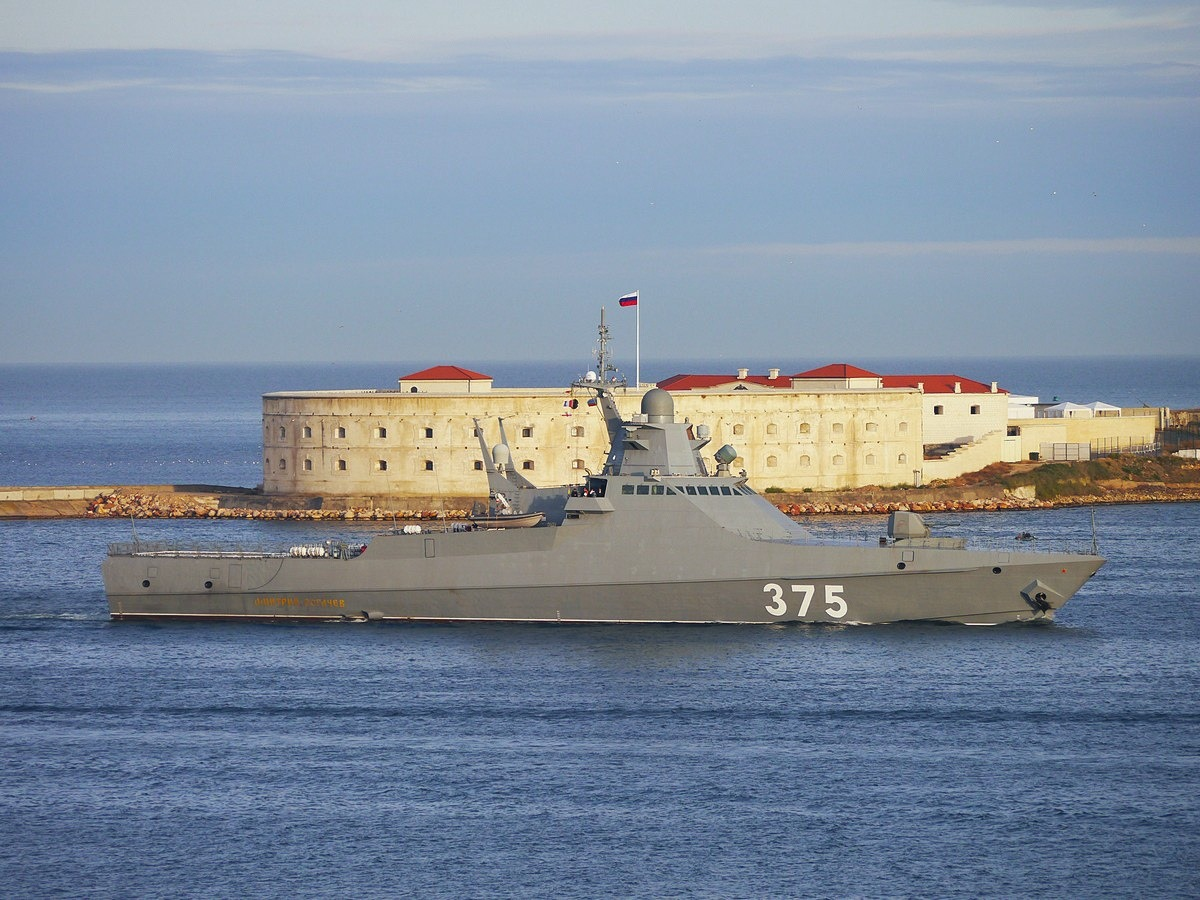
- Dmitriy Rogachev at Sevastopol

Class overview
- Name: Project 22160
- Builders: Zelenodolsk Shipyard; Zaliv Shipyard
- Operators: Russian Navy
- Subclasses: Project 22160
- Built: 2014–present
- In commission: 2018
- Planned: 6
- Building: 1
- Completed: 5
- Active: 4
- Lost: 1

General characteristics
- Type: Patrol ship
- Displacement: from 1,300 to 1,700 tons (domestic)
- Length: 94 m (308 ft 5 in)
- Beam: 14 m (45 ft 11 in)
- Draught: 3.4 m (11 ft 2 in)
- Installed power: 12,000 hp (8,900 kW) (main unit), 400 kW (DGs)
- Propulsion: CODAG 2 × (Kolomna 16D49) 6,000 hp (4,500 kW) cruise diesels; 2 × boost gas turbines (M70FRU or M90FRU); Electric unit (4 diesel generators, 1 emergency DG); CODAG or CODAD
- Speed: 25 to 30 knots (46 to 56 km/h; 29 to 35 mph), (Domestic CODAD) 27 knots (50 km/h; 31 mph)
- Range: 6,000 nmi (11,000 km; 6,900 mi)
- Endurance: 60 days
- Complement: 80
- Sensors & processing systems: Pal-N, Pozitiv-MK radars, Sfera-2 opto-electronic station
- Electronic warfare & decoys: TK-25
- Armament: 1 × 76.2 mm AK-176MA automatic dual-purpose gun; Tor-M2KM SAM system (added to active units in 2022); VLS cells with Kalibr-NK system (proposed); 3S90M VLS air defence system (proposed); 3M47 Gibka naval air defence system (offered for export proposals); 2 × 14.5 mm MTPU machine guns; DP-65 10-barreled anti-saboteur automatic grenade launcher system; DP-64 2-barreled anti-saboteur grenade launcher system; A variety of module containers including weapon modules containing 324 mm Paket-NK torpedoes, 3M24 and Kalibr-NK
- Aircraft carried: 1 × Ka-27 or Ka-226

Project 22160 is a series of large patrol ships being constructed for the Russian Navy. The vessels are primarily intended for duties such as patrol, monitoring and protection in open and closed seas. The first ship was laid down in February 2014 and joined the Russian Navy in December 2018. By January 2018, six ships were under construction. Between 2017 and 2022, four ships had been launched.

During the Russo-Ukrainian War several of these ships were repeatedly attacked by Ukrainian unmanned surface vehicles. On 5 March 2024, Ukraine spokespeople claimed they had sunk Sergey Kotov.

== Ships ==
Italics indicate estimates.

Name	Builders	Laid down	Launched	Commissioned	Fleet	Status
Vasily Bykov	Zelenodolsk Shipyard	26 February 2014	28 August 2017	20 December 2018	Black Sea	Active
Dmitriy Rogachev	Zelenodolsk Shipyard	25 July 2014	end-2017	11 June 2019	Black Sea	Active
Pavel Derzhavin	Zaliv Shipyard	18 February 2016	21 February 2019	27 November 2020	Black Sea	Active, reportedly damaged by a Ukrainian sea drone in October 2023; reported repaired and re-located from Crimea to the eastern Black Sea as of 2024
Sergey Kotov	Zaliv Shipyard	8 May 2016	29 January 2021	30 July 2022	Black Sea	Attacked by Ukrainian USV drone in September 2023. Ukraine claimed damaged. It was attacked again by naval drones in March 2024, with Ukraine claiming it had been sunk by the attack; other sources also report her as sunk.
Viktor Velikiy	Zelenodolsk Shipyard	25 November 2016	7 May 2024	28 August 2025	Black Sea	Active and operating in the Baltic/Mediterranean as of 2026
Nikolay Sipyagin	Zelenodolsk Shipyard	13 January 2018			Black Sea	Under construction

== Design ==
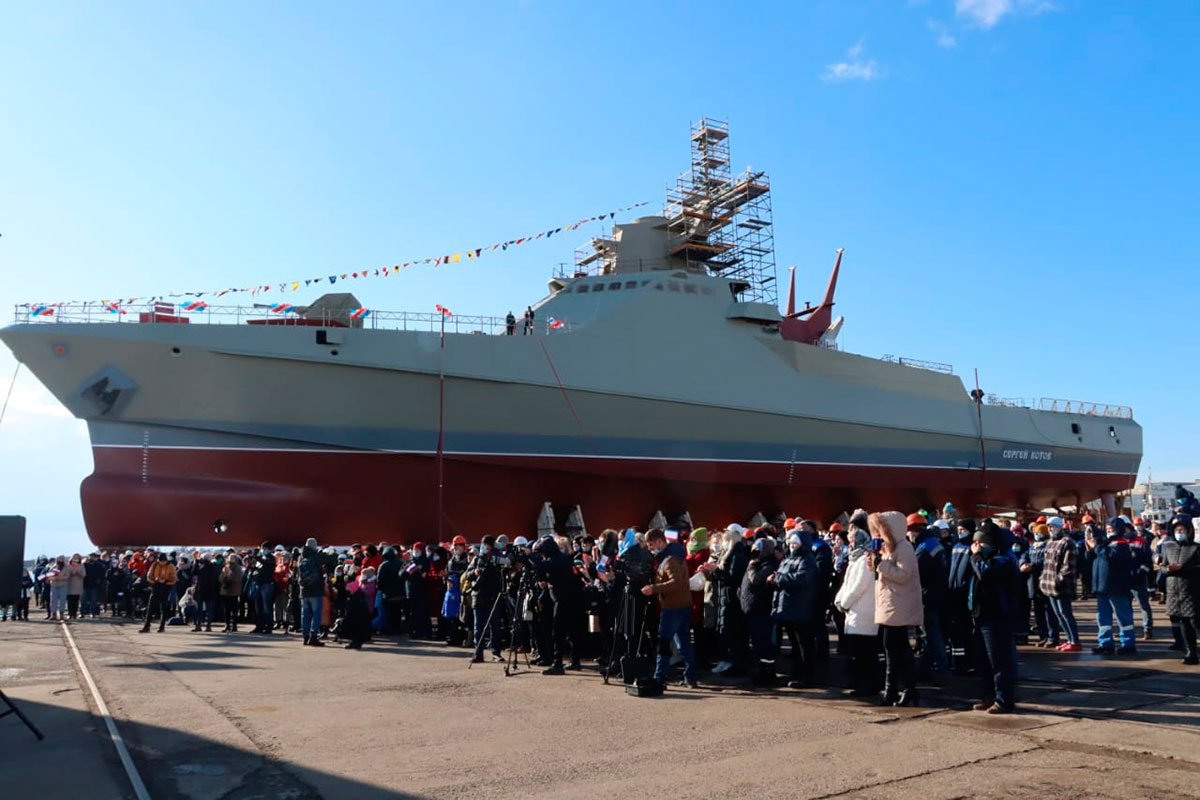
Sergey Kotov launching ceremony at Zalyv Shipbuilding Yard, Kerch

The class's armaments include the Kalibr-NK cruise missile, the AK-176 76.2 mm dual-purpose naval gun, aerosol camouflage, two grenade launchers, and two machine guns. The class has a helicopter deck and hangar for one Ka-27 or Ka-226 helicopter, a landing speedboat, and provisions for drones, underwater unmanned craft, and unmanned boats. There are accommodations for an additional 60 sailors.

In 2020 it was announced that the Russian Navy would begin trials to test the installation of module containers on patrol vessels permitting such ships to carry significantly upgraded armaments tailored to different missions. The containers were envisaged to carry various weapons including sonars and torpedoes or anti-ship and cruise missiles. The trials took place in the Arctic Sea from June 2020 and lasted two months.

The Russian Navy planned to order six additional ships since 2014, but these plans were abandoned in June 2022 after dissatisfaction with the ships' performance during the Russian invasion of Ukraine. Flaws include insufficient seaworthiness, light armour, and a lack of adequate air defences. After the sinking of Moskva, the Russian Navy began attaching Tor-M2 km missile systems onto the helicopter decks of the patrol ships.

On 17 August 2022, Ak Bars CEO Renat Mistakhov stated that further vessels can be constructed, which will be armed with new anti-aircraft missiles.

== Operational history ==
=== Vasily Bykov ===
Vasily Bykov participated in the attack on Snake Island on 24 February 2022, the first day of the Russian invasion of Ukraine, together with the Russian cruiser Moskva. This confrontation ended in the Russian takeover of Snake Island.

On 7 March 2022, Ukrainian sources claimed that the Armed Forces of Ukraine had hit Vasily Bykov with rocket artillery off the coast of Odesa, possibly damaging it On 5 August 2022, one of the ships of the class was seen entering Sevastopol with fire damage to the stern, thought by an open-source intelligence analyst to be the result of an attack the day before.

On 13 August 2022, Russia announced that Vasily Bykov had opened warning fire from automatic weapons to stop the Palauan-flagged cargo ship Sukru Okan, which was navigating through the Black Sea, after it failed to respond to a Russian request for an inspection.

=== Dmitry Rogachev ===
On 15 January 2021, Dmitry Rogachev moved from the Black Sea to the Mediterranean Sea, to strengthen the Russian Navy squadron.

=== Pavel Derzhavin ===
Ukraine reportedly attacked and damaged Pavel Derzhavin with Sea Baby unmanned surface vehicles (USV) on 11 October 2023.

=== Sergey Kotov ===
Main Directorate of Intelligence footage of the attack on Sergey Kotov by Group 13

On 21 January 2021, it was reported that Sergey Kotov was operational and would join the Black Sea Fleet. Ukrainian spokesmen said the ship cost about 65 million USD. The ship is named after Russian counter admiral Sergey Kotov (1912–1999).

On 14 September 2023, Ukraine claimed to have damaged two ships with naval unmanned surface vehicles (USVs). Ukraine showed a video of a naval USV attacking Sergey Kotov. Kyrylo Budanov, the head of Ukrainian military intelligence, said that it received damage to its propeller and a 50-by-100-centimeter (20 by 39 in) hole in its hull, which would require it to spend some time undergoing repair.

On 5 March 2024, Sergey Kotov was again attacked by Ukrainian forces, this time using MAGURA V5 USVs while the ship was off the coast of Crimea near the Kerch Strait. Ukrainian military spokesmen announced the ship took damage to the stern, and later sank. Traffic to the Kerch Strait Bridge was stopped, but was not given a reason why. The Russian Ministry of Defence confirmed the attack but did not comment on the damage to the ship.

== Export ==
In April 2018, it was reported that negotiations are underway after Algeria showed interest in acquiring four project 22160 patrol ships, equipped with the Club-N missile system and the Palma anti-aircraft system which includes the Sosna guided missiles. The demand for ships armed with the Kalibr cruise missiles grew after Russia's use of these missiles in combat in Syria.

== See also ==
- List of ships of the Soviet Navy
- List of ships of Russia by project number
- Okean-class patrol ship
- Rubin-class patrol boat
- List of ship losses during the Russo-Ukrainian War
