= Vasily Bykov =

Vasily Bykov may refer to:

- Vasil Bykaŭ (1924–2003), Soviet Belarusian author
- Russian patrol ship Vasily Bykov, named after Vasily Ivanovich Bykov
