= Russian patrol ship Sergey Kotov =

Patrol ship of the Russian Black Sea Fleet

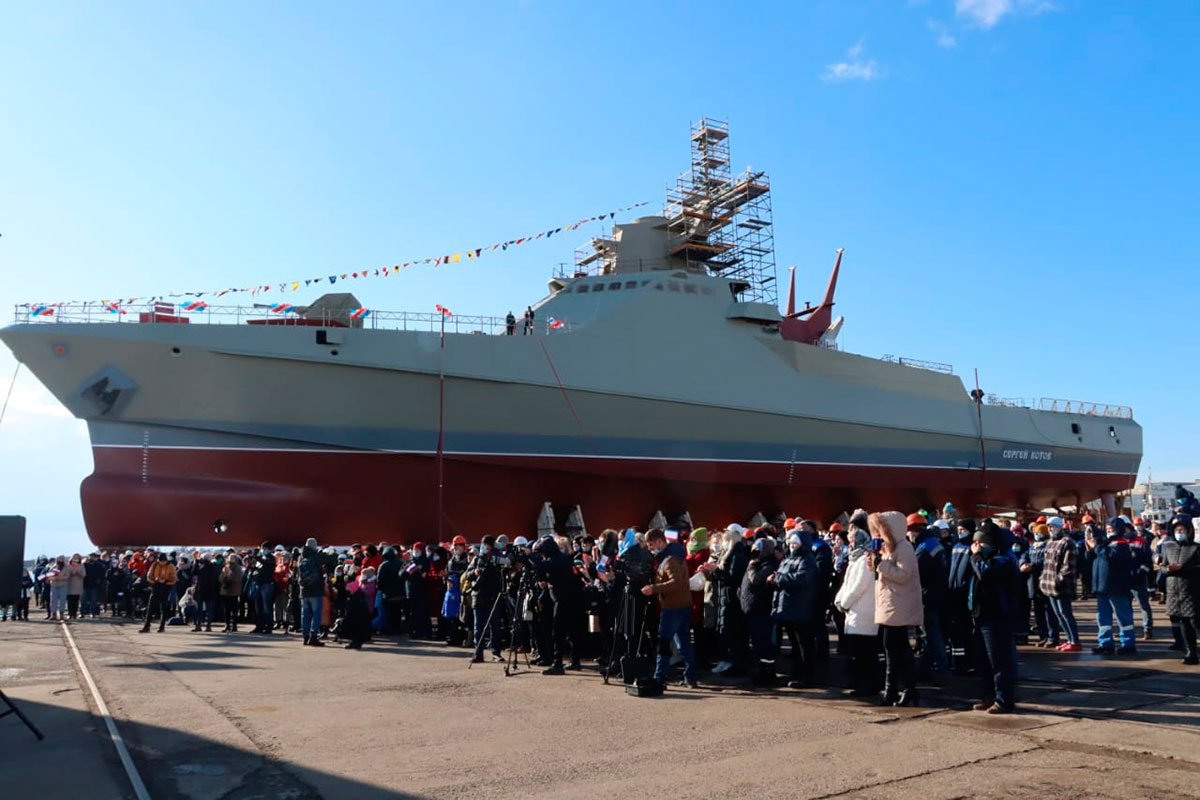
- Sergey Kotov launching ceremony at Zalyv Shipbuilding Yard, Kerch

History

Russia
- Name: Sergey Kotov
- Namesake: Sergey Kotov
- Builder: JSC Zelenodolsk Plant, Zalyv Shipbuilding Yard
- Laid down: 8 May 2016
- Launched: 29 January 2021
- Commissioned: 30 July 2022
- Fate: Attacked by naval drones in 5 March 2024 and lost at sea

General characteristics
- Class & type: Project 22160 patrol ship
- Complement: 80
- Armament: 1 × 76.2 mm AK-176MA automatic dual-purpose gun; 2 × 14.5 mm MTPU machineguns; DP-65 10 barreled anti-saboteur automatic grenade launcher system; DP-64 2 barreled anti-saboteur grenade launcher system; A variety of module containers including weapon modules containing 324 mm Paket-NK torpedoes, 3M24, Kalibr-NK cruise missiles and 9M331M surface-to-air missiles
- Aircraft carried: 1 × Ka-27 or Ka-226

Main Directorate of Intelligence of Ukraine footage of the 2024 attack on Sergey Kotov

Sergey Kotov (Russian: Сергей Котов) was a Project 22160 patrol ship of the Russian Navy. She was attacked in the Black Sea by Ukrainian forces using MAGURA V5 maritime drones on 5 March 2024, and Ukrainian intelligence claimed the ship was sunk.

The ship is named after Russian counter admiral Sergey Kotov (1912–1999).

The ship was the third notable Russian warship sunk by Ukrainian forces in 2024, after Ivanovets on 1 February and Tsezar Kunikov on 14 February.

== Operational history ==
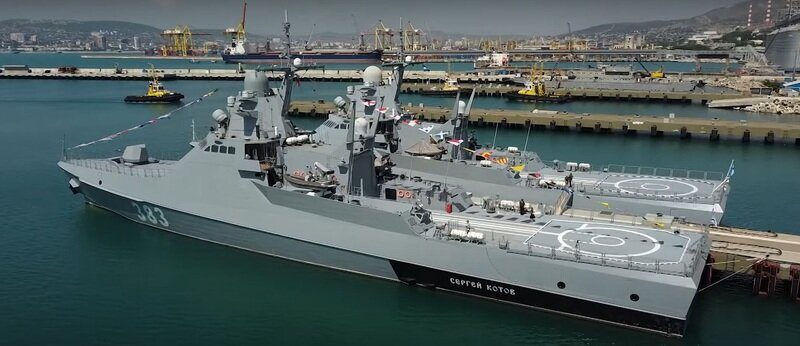
Sergy Kotov in 2022

Sergei Kotov began sea trials at Novorossiysk from 29 October 2021 in the Black Sea. The ship was to be handed over to the Russian Navy at the end of 2021, however, it was handed over to the Russian Navy only on 16 May 2022, and commissioning on 30 July. The vessel was assigned to the Black Sea Fleet.

During the Russian invasion of Ukraine, the first identified maritime drone attack on Sergey Kotov occurred on 1 August 2023, was reported as unsuccessful by the Russian Defense Ministry, by three naval drones on the Black Sea Fleet patrol vessels Sergei Kotov and Vasily Bykov. On 14 September 2023, Sergey Kotov was attacked and damaged by a Ukrainian MAGURA V5 unmanned surface vehicle (USV). The Russian Ministry of Defence confirmed the attack but did not comment on the damage to the ship.

On 5 March 2024, Ukrainian military intelligence stated that naval drones of the Group 13 hit the ship near Feodosia, Crimea, near the Kerch Strait. Ukrainian intelligence posted a video of the attack. Ukraine's HUR claimed that seven people on board were killed while six others were injured.

== See also ==
- List of ship losses during the Russo-Ukrainian War
