= Snake Island campaign =

Campaign in the Russo-Ukrainian war

- Part of the Russo-Ukrainian war (2022–present)
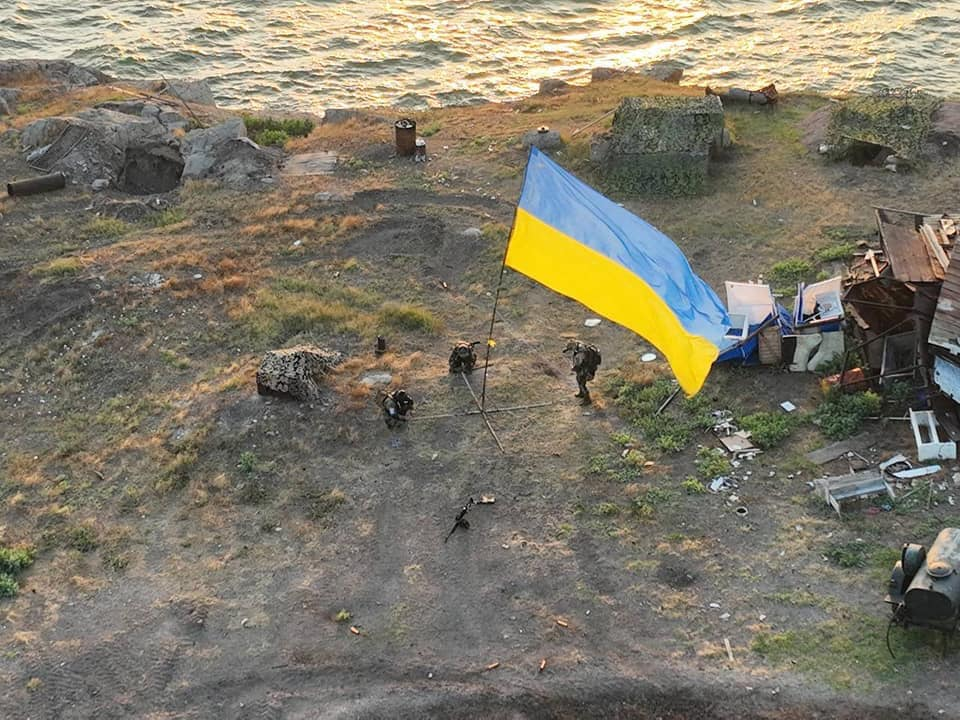
- Soldiers raise the Ukrainian national flag on Snake Island, July 2022
Date	24 February – 30 June 2022 (4 months and 6 days)
Location	Snake Island, Odesa Oblast 45°15′18″N 30°12′15″E
Result	Ukrainian victory

Belligerents
Russia	Ukraine

Strength
1 missile cruiser: Moskva; 1 patrol ship: Vasily Bykov	Per Ukrainian sources: 80 servicemen Per Russian sources: 82 soldiers (24 February); 16 boats (25 February)

Casualties and losses
Russian seizure None; Ukrainian recapture Per Ukrainian sources: 1 guided missile cruiser sunk 4 "Raptor" boats 1 "Serna" class landing ship "Vasily Bekh" tugboat 1 Mi-8 helicopter 3 air defense systems 3 Pantsir missile systems	Russian seizure Per Ukrainian sources: 80 captured 1 search and rescue boat seized Per Russian sources: 82 soldiers captured 6 boats sunk Ukrainian recapture Per Ukrainian sources: 10 killed DSHK-1 assault craft 2 Su-24MR; 1 Bayraktar TB2 drone
- Location of Snake Island in the Black Sea

The Snake Island campaign was a Russian military attack on and occupation of Snake Island, a small, strategically located Ukrainian island in the Black Sea. On 24 February 2022, the first day of the 2022 Russian invasion of Ukraine, the Russian Navy attacked Snake Island and captured it along with its garrison, beginning a 126-day military occupation.

The attack was widely publicized after a recording of a radio conversation went viral. On the clip, the Russian cruiser Moskva hails the island's garrison over the radio demanding their surrender; a Ukrainian soldier responds, "Russian warship, go fuck yourself" (Russian: 'Русский военный корабль, иди на хуй', romanized: Russky voyenny korabl, idi na khuy). There were initial inaccurate reports of the garrison's deaths.

Russian forces also captured a civilian search-and-rescue ship that sought to evacuate the soldiers. The ship, its crew, and at least one soldier were later freed in prisoner exchanges.

After the island was captured, Ukraine began to attack Russian forces on and around the island. It fired anti-ship missiles at Russian vessels and launched air, artillery, and missile strikes at Russian positions on the island. On 30 June 2022, Russian forces withdrew from the island, in what they described as a "goodwill gesture".

Russia later bombed the island; its claims of casualties on the Ukrainian military were disputed by Ukraine.

== Background ==
Snake Island is a rocky island with an area of less than 1 square kilometre (0.4 sq mi) that is situated off the southwestern coast of Ukraine, located 45 kilometres (28 mi) from the coast of Romania and at the southern boundary of Ukrainian territorial waters in the Black Sea. This position makes it strategically important, allowing whoever controls it to blockade Odesa and dominate large parts of the Black Sea, including the area around Constanta. The island also has economic importance, as within the exclusive economic zone that it projects are significant reserves of hydrocarbons. The only settlement on the island is Bile, a small village built in 2007.

In August 2021, as Russian forces built up around Ukraine, Ukrainian president Volodymyr Zelenskyy held a press event on the island, during which he said: "This island, like the rest of our territory, is Ukrainian land, and we will defend it with all our might."

== Capture by Russia ==
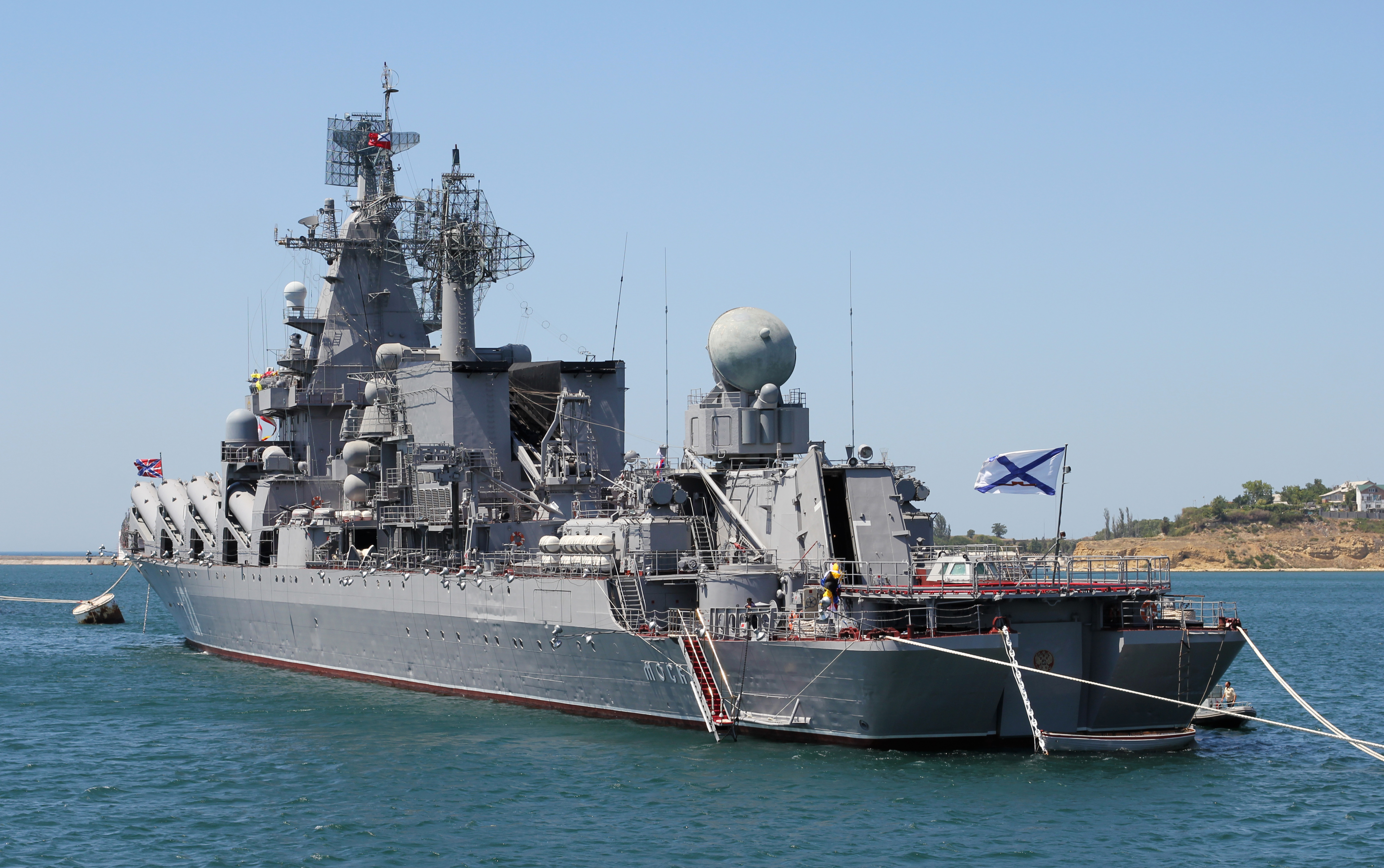
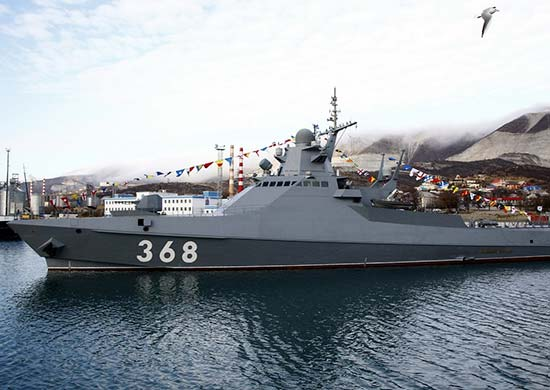
The Russian Navy vessels involved: cruiser Moskva (left) and patrol ship Vasily Bykov (right).

On 24 February 2022, the first day of the Russian invasion of Ukraine, Ukrainian State Border Guards announced about 18:00 local time that Snake Island had come under attack by the Russian cruiser Moskva and patrol ship Vasily Bykov who were attempting to seize it as part of the battle for control of the Black Sea.

External videos
- 'Go fuck yourself', Ukrainian soldiers on Snake Island tell Russian ship – audio on YouTube – via The Guardian

When the Russian warship identified itself and ordered the Ukrainian soldiers stationed on the island to surrender, a border guard later identified as Roman Hrybov replied, "Russian warship, go fuck yourself." (Russian: 'Русский военный корабль, иди на хуй', romanized: Russky voyenny korabl, idi na khuy). An audio clip of the exchange was first shared by Ukrainian government official Anton Herashchenko, then widely publicized by Ukrainska Pravda, and later verified as authentic by Ukrainian government sources.

One Ukrainian border guard live-streamed the moment that the Russian warship opened fire. Later in the evening, the State Border Guard Service said that communication with the island had been lost. At 22:00 (01:00 Moscow Time, UTC+2), service officials announced that Russian forces had captured the island following a naval and air bombardment that destroyed all infrastructure on the island. After the bombardment, a detachment of Russian soldiers landed and took control of Snake Island.

The Russian government reported that on 25 February 2022, a squadron of 16 boats of the Ukrainian Navy attacked Russian vessels off Snake Island, also claiming that it sank six of the Ukrainian boats. The Russian government further accused the United States of providing intelligence support to the Ukrainian squadron during the action. The United States denied any involvement.

On 26 February 2022, Ukrainian authorities announced that the civilian search and rescue ship Sapfir had been captured by the Russian Navy off Snake Island.

== Status of Ukrainian soldiers and civilian sailors ==
Ukrainian government sources initially stated that 13 border guards of the Izmail Border Detachment, representing the entirety of the Ukrainian military presence on the island, were killed after refusing to surrender. Zelenskyy announced that the border guards would be posthumously awarded the title of Hero of Ukraine.

Russian defence media presented an alternative version of events, claiming that 82 Ukrainian soldiers had been taken prisoner after surrendering voluntarily, and had been taken to Sevastopol. Russian Defense Ministry spokesman Igor Konashenkov claimed that the prisoners had been signing pledges promising not to continue military action against Russia, and would be released soon.

The State Border Guard Service of Ukraine later announced that the guards might instead have been captured, based on the Russian reports that they were being held as prisoners of war. On 26 February 2022 it issued a statement saying that they believed "that all Ukrainian defenders of Snake Island may be alive". On 28 February 2022, the Ukrainian Navy posted on its Facebook page that all the border guards of the island were alive and detained by the Russian Navy.

=== Release ===
On 24 March 2022, Sapfir and 19 Ukrainian civilian sailors were released by Russia in a prisoner exchange. 10 prisoners of war were released in the same exchange, and Ukraine stated that Deputy Prime Minister Vereshchuk was working towards the release of Snake Island prisoners particularly.

On 30 March 2022, it was reported that the soldier who made the remark toward the ship was released in a prisoner exchange, and subsequently awarded a Ukrainian medal.

One year later, in May 2023, German television ZDF reported that 36 Ukrainian men continued to be Russian prisoners of war. According to Ukrainian sources, an unspecified number of these soldiers were also released in two major prisoner exchanges with Russia in January 2024.

== Ukrainian counteroffensive and recapture ==
On 14 April, Ukraine claimed their anti-ship missiles fired from Odesa had struck and sunk the Moskva, a Russian guided missile cruiser that served as the flagship of the Black Sea Fleet. This forced Russia to withdraw its ships beyond the range of the missiles, leaving the island exposed as it increased the difficulty of resupplying the occupying forces by sea. From 26 to 30 April OC South claimed strikes on the Russian forces on the island left a control post hit and two anti-aircraft missile complex Strela-10 destroyed as well as 42 Russian soldiers killed.

On 1 May, Ukrainian Air Force Command South claimed to have launched an attack on Snake Island that destroyed Russian equipment stationed there, and the next day at dawn two Russian Raptor patrol and landing boats were sunk by a Baykar Bayraktar TB2 drone. Video footage was released showing the boats being struck by guided bombs followed by explosions and fires on them.

On 7 May, Ukraine officials reported and displayed footage of a Russian Serna-class landing craft located in the Black Sea being destroyed near Snake Island by a Ukrainian Baykar Bayraktar TB2 drone. Ukrainian Baykar Bayraktar TB2 drones were used to destroy two Tor surface-to-air missile launchers, one of which was in the process of being unloaded from the Serna-class landing craft, possibly clearing the way for a pair of Ukrainian Su-27s conducting a high-speed, low level bombing run that day. Satellite photos seem to back up the footage, but Russia claimed it was repaired and will soon return to service.

Later, footage of a Ukrainian drone strike on a hovering Russian Mi-8 on Snake Island was released, and independently verified by Reuters. This marked the first known aerial kill by a drone. An additional two or three Raptor-class patrol boats were also destroyed by a TB2 drone. The Ukrainians claimed to have killed 46 Russian service members during the attacks. Meanwhile, on the same day the Russian Ministry of Defense claimed Russian forces repelled Ukrainian attempts to retake Snake Island. During the 7 May actions, Ukrainian forces losses according to Ukrainian media reached 10 killed and the assault craft Stanislav.

On 9 May, Ukrainian presidential adviser Oleksiy Arestovych said that Russian army holding the island is an advantage for Ukraine, as they can repeatedly assault Russian targets on the island. The UK Ministry of Defense reported that according to their analysis, Russia was trying to reinforce an exposed garrison on the island, whereupon Ukraine had successfully launched drone attacks against resupply vessels and air defenses. The status of the island is critical to both Ukraine and Russia as a military asset.

On 12 May, Ukraine claimed it had attacked Russian logistics ship Vsevolod Bobrov near Snake Island while it was attempting to deliver an air defense system, causing it to catch on fire and be towed back to Sevastopol. Russia did not provide a comment on the event, and there were no reports of casualties. On the same day, Maxar Technologies captured a satellite image of a Russian Serna-class landing craft taking evasive maneuvers from a Ukrainian missile.

On 16 May, the Russian Defense Ministry claimed that a Ukrainian Su-24 was shot down near the island. On 1 June, Ukraine claimed that Russian forces had installed multiple rocket launchers on the island.

On 17 June, Ukraine sunk the Russian tug Spasatel Vasily Bekh with two Harpoon missiles, preventing it from delivering vital supplies such as weapons and personnel and forcing Russia to rethink their position on the island. The Russians claimed that out of 33 crew members, 10 were missing and the other 23 were injured. Three days later Ukrainian forces struck gas platforms near the island that it said Russian forces had been using by installing radio jamming equipment. Strikes continued the next day, with Ukraine claiming the destruction of military vehicles as well as anti-aircraft and radar systems, likely a Pantsir-S1, claims that Russia denied. Russian officials countered that the Russian forces have intercepted all of the incoming rounds, destroyed 13 drones, and repelled an amphibious assault; this has been met with doubt by the online publication The Drive.

On 26 June, a Ukrainian Air Force Su-24MR piloted by Coronel Mikhail Matyushenko and navigator Major Yuri Krasilnikov was shot down during a mission on Snake Island. Both crewmembers died. Another Su-24 was lost during a raid but both crewmembers managed to eject and survived.

On 27 June, Ukrainian officials released footage of Ukrainian forces conducting 10 precision strikes on the island. A second Pantsir-S1 was reportedly destroyed in the attack. The Russian MoD denied that their system was destroyed and instead claimed that their Pantsir system destroyed 12 rockets and a Ukrainian Su-25. Ukraine's southern command stated that there was an ongoing operation to recapture the island.

These regular attacks against the island and its resupply ships made the Russian position untenable. According to Ukrainian officials, the Russian Air Force attacked Ukrainian rocket and artillery positions in the Odesa Oblast with Su-35 fighters in order to reduce the intensity of the Ukrainian attacks on Snake Island. Three Kh-31D missiles were reportedly fired, but Ukrainians claimed no casualties or damages were reported. On 29 June, Ukrainian forces claimed to have destroyed one of four helicopters, possibly a Ka-52, that were approaching the island during a search and rescue operation.

On 30 June, Russian forces retreated in what has been described as a major Ukrainian victory and a propaganda coup. Russia claimed that their troops had completed their assigned tasks and that the move was a "goodwill gesture" to demonstrate that Russia was not preventing the establishment of a shipping corridor to allow the export of grain from Odesa, while Ukraine claimed that they forced the Russians to withdraw in two speedboats through artillery and missile attacks; photos show the island enveloped in smoke.

== Subsequent Russian shelling ==
On 1 July at around 18:00, two Russian Su-30s bombed the island in two air strikes with phosphorus bombs, according to the Commander-in-Chief of the Armed Forces of Ukraine. Ukrainian officials believe these airstrikes were an attempted scorched earth tactic to destroy weapons and equipment that were left behind.

On 4 July, the Ukrainian Operational Command South reported that the island was fully recaptured; a Ukrainian flag was raised over it.

On 7 July, Russian Defence Ministry announced its aircraft carried out another missile strike against Snake Island, killing a number of Ukrainian troops there. According to Ukrainian sources, no casualties were reported; however, a pier was "seriously damaged" as a result of two missiles that struck the island.

Overnight on 11 February 2023, two Russian Su-24 bombers carried out four air strikes against the Snake Island with use of air-dropped bombs.

== Analysis ==
Despite being a small and almost unremarkable island, Snake Island has been described as strategically valuable, besides the symbolic value for Ukrainian resistance which the island attained due to the famous exchange between the Ukrainian garrisons and the Moskva at the onset of the invasion. Control over the island would allow Russia to establish long-range air defense, cruise missiles, and electronic warfare assets to cover the north-western part of the Black Sea and southern Ukraine, as well as help the Russian navy reinforce its naval blockade and control the flow of civilian vessels. This is particularly true for the city of Odesa, as most of Ukraine's agriculture export comes out of the port of Odesa. Additionally, Russia's control over the island would allow the country to reinforce its presence with Transnistria, a Russian controlled breakaway region of Moldova. Furthermore, a Russian controlled Snake Island represents a major security threat to NATO as the island is only 28 miles (45 km) away from Romania. British naval analyst Jonathan Bentham and Romanian historian Dorin Dobrincu believe that if Russia deploys missile systems, such as the S-400, NATO's southern flank would be in serious danger. Russian military-political analyst Alexander Mikhailov stated that with Snake Island Russia can control and blockade naval traffic between the north-western Black Sea and the Danube Delta. For Romania, a Russian blockade of Romania's ports would pose a major economic risk. Romania's Euro-Atlantic Resilience Centre believes Russia's intention in capturing Snake Island is to annex it in order to control as many shipping routes as possible that lead to the Bosphorus Strait in Turkey.

The loss of the cruiser Moskva is said to have deteriorated the Russian naval threat, particularly its air defense, in the Black Sea. It is believed that with the loss of such a large vessel and the air defense void left behind for the Russian Black Sea fleet, the Ukrainian forces became emboldened to carry out these attacks on the Russian-occupied Snake Island. Coupled with the stalling and reversal of the Russian advances from the Battle of Mykolaiv, the Russian forces on Snake Island became increasingly isolated and vulnerable. Russian forces made efforts to improve their air defenses on Snake Island following the loss of the Moskva and repeated Ukrainian airstrikes. These included deploying several Pantsir and Tor missile systems. However, the isolated location of Snake Island still left resupply ships vulnerable to attacks, something the Ukrainian forces exploited and US Department of Defense credits for forcing the Russian forces to abandon Snake Island. Ukraine's success in forcing the Russians to withdraw from the island has been attributed in part to the supply of Western weapons, including the use of Harpoon anti-ship missiles, while pro-Russian reporters have attributed some of Ukraine's success to the use of the French CAESAR self-propelled howitzer.

Ukraine's usage of the TB2 drones to attack Snake Island has highlighted the increased importance of drone warfare and the reputation of TB2's service record. The initial success using the TB2s stunned some observers. However, the scenario that unfolded at Snake Island offered the perfect environment for such a system. The drone enjoyed a lack of redundant medium to long range air defense systems since all the Air Defense systems deployed on the island were short range defense systems (SHORADS), while the Russian forces were also unable to establish Combat Air Patrols (CAP) by fighter jets over the island. As such, after the sinking of the Moskva missile cruiser and the withdraw of the Black Sea Fleet, the island was effectively cut out of the Russian air defense envelope. To further decrease the effectiveness of the local scattered SHORAD Systems, the island is small and offers no place to cover, not even trees: not able to hide, not able to run, lacking in range, fighter top cover, situational awareness, scattered SHORAD systems on a small rocky island turned to be simple targets for any aerial asset out-ranging them. Overall, the successful use of the TB2 drone on Snake Island was triggered by a series of tactical mistakes by the Russian forces. Secondary elements in the initial success included the TB2 being a modular design allowing it to be assembled and disassembled quickly in areas where larger aircraft or UAVs can't operate. This would make it easier for the drones to avoid destruction when Russian forces strike Ukrainian air bases.

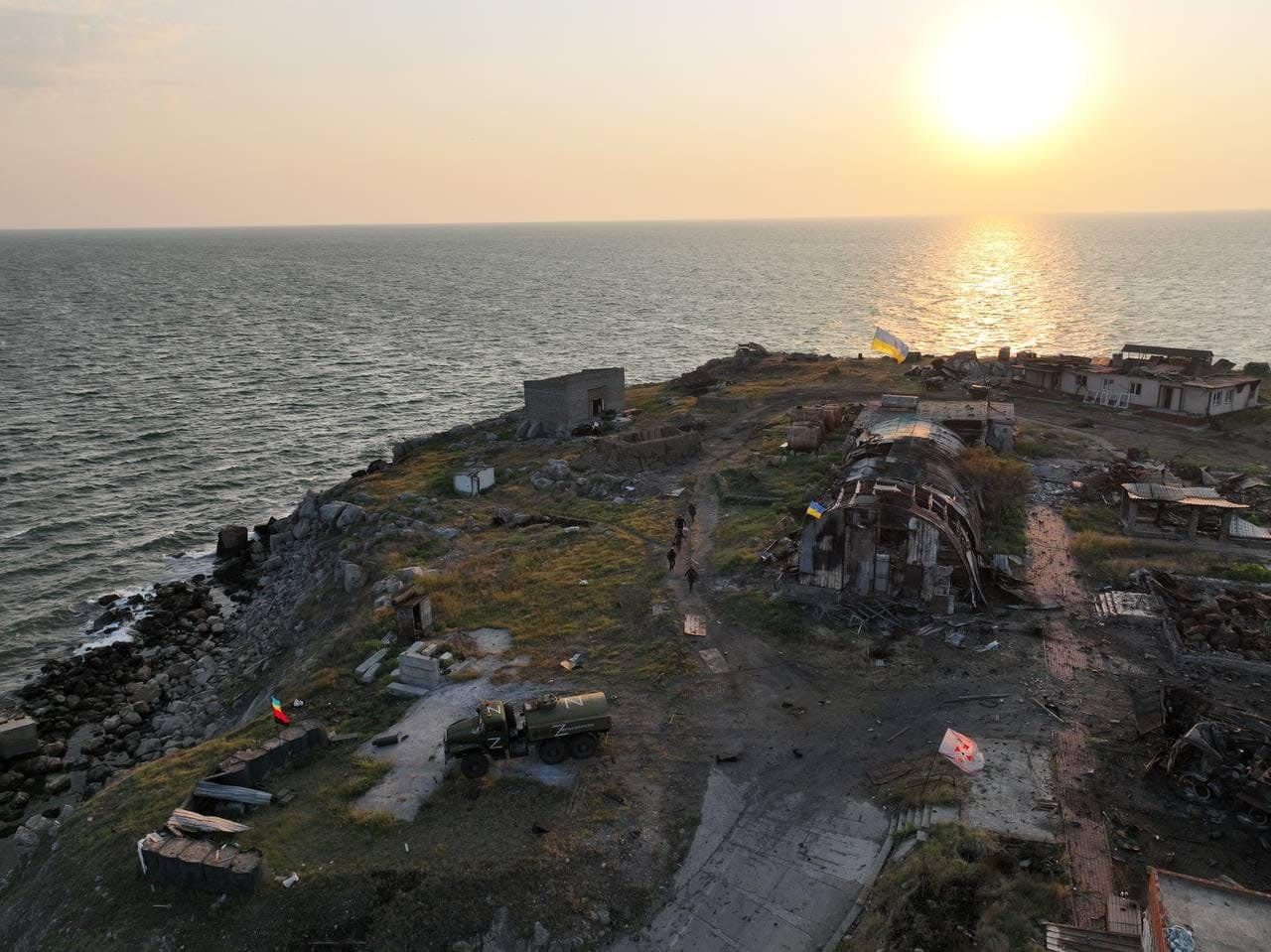
Debris on the island on 7 July 2022

Following the Russian force's retreat from the island, the US Department of Defense and the Institute for the Study of War (ISW) stated that Ukraine will be able to better defend Odesa and nearby coastal regions. Oleksiy Danilov, secretary of National Security and Defense Council of Ukraine, emphasized the importance of Russia's retreat by claiming that Russian signals intelligence were present on the island and could monitor the Odesa Oblast, the Bessarabia region, and Transnistria.

Throughout the campaign, both sides have often put forth claims of attacks and damage inflicted on their opponents. The Drive, a sister publication to The War Zone, and the ISW have expressed doubt on the Russian claims of repeatedly repelling Ukrainian attacks, noting that such claims are never supported with hard evidence. Conversely, Ukrainian claims are usually supported with satellite imagery or combat footage of the operation.

In terms of casualties, on 14 May, Ukrainian intelligence have claimed that out of 40 Russian officers deployed to Snake Island, only eight have returned alive back to Sevastopol. Ukrainian intelligence and a Wagner mercenary have also claimed that Russian Special Operations Forces were killed on the island. Forbes estimated that Russia lost $915 million worth of equipment occupying Snake Island, around three-quarters of which belonged to the cruiser Moskva.

== Legacy ==
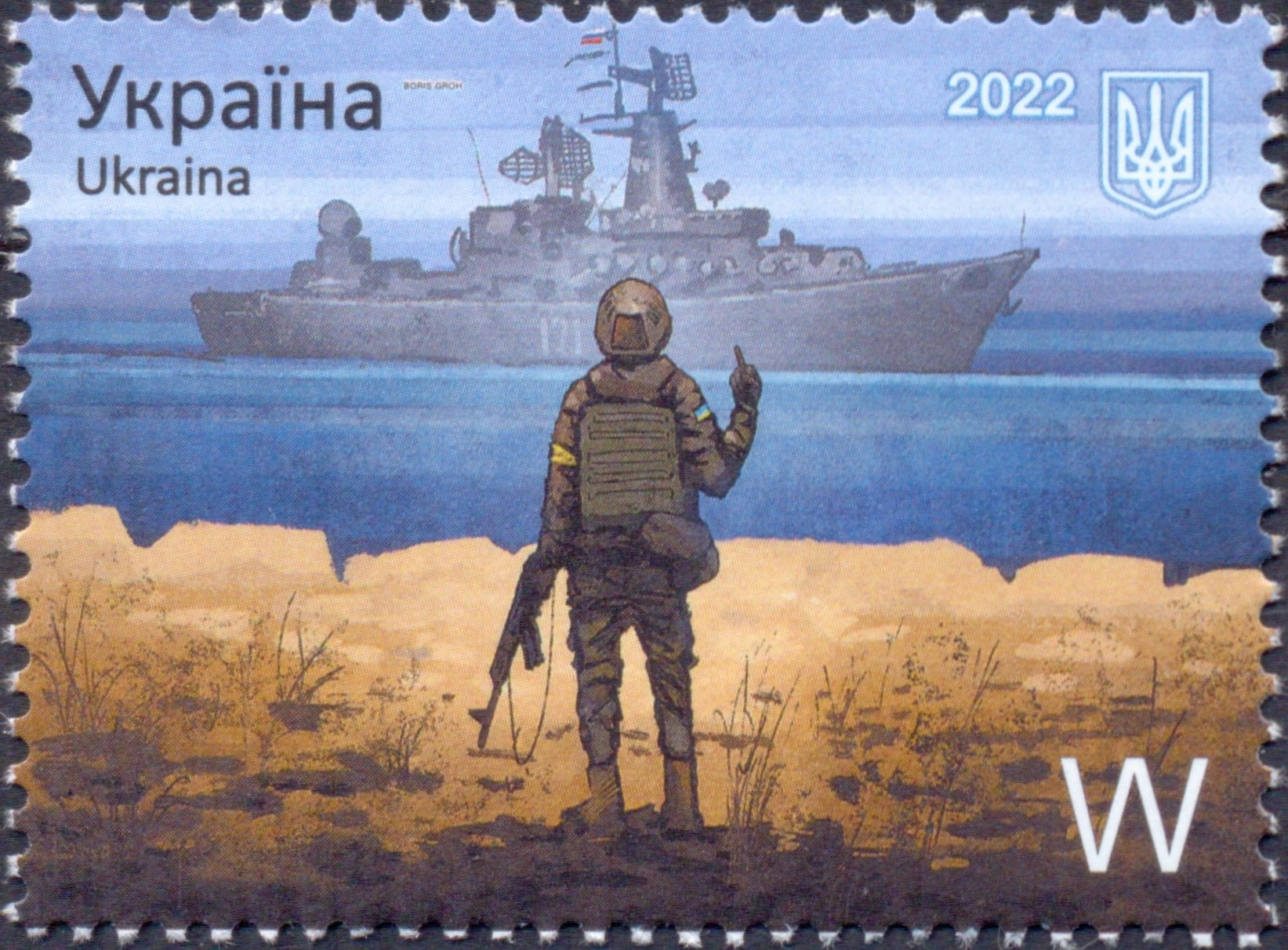
Ukrainian postage stamp featuring a Ukrainian soldier in battle dress flipping off the Moskva

The Ukrainian border guards' final communication before the attack, "Russian warship, go fuck yourself!", went viral and became a rallying cry for Ukrainians and their supporters around the world. The Week compared the phrase to "Remember the Alamo" from the 19th-century Texas Revolution.

In March 2022, the Ukrainian government announced that a postage stamp honoring the soldiers on Snake Island would be released. In a public vote, Ukrainian artist Boris Groh's design of a Ukrainian soldier standing on a beach and giving the finger to a passing Russian warship received the most votes and was selected.

On 13 April 2022, the warship Moskva that was used in the attack and that the Ukrainians had told to "go fuck yourself" exploded and burned, according to Ukraine as a result of being hit by two R-360 Neptune anti-ship missiles fired from offshore in or near Odesa. On 14 April, the Russians attempted to tow the damaged ship in the direction of Sevastopol but she ultimately sank before she reached port.

In 2023 a street in Darnytskyi District in Kyiv was named "Heroes of Snake Island".

== See also ==
- List of last stands
- Raid on Porto Buso
- Battle of Ad-Dawrah
- Naval warfare in the Russian invasion of Ukraine
