= Russian cruiser Moskva =

Guided missile cruiser in service from 1983 to 2022

Coordinates: 45.2951°N 30.8789°E

Moskva (121)
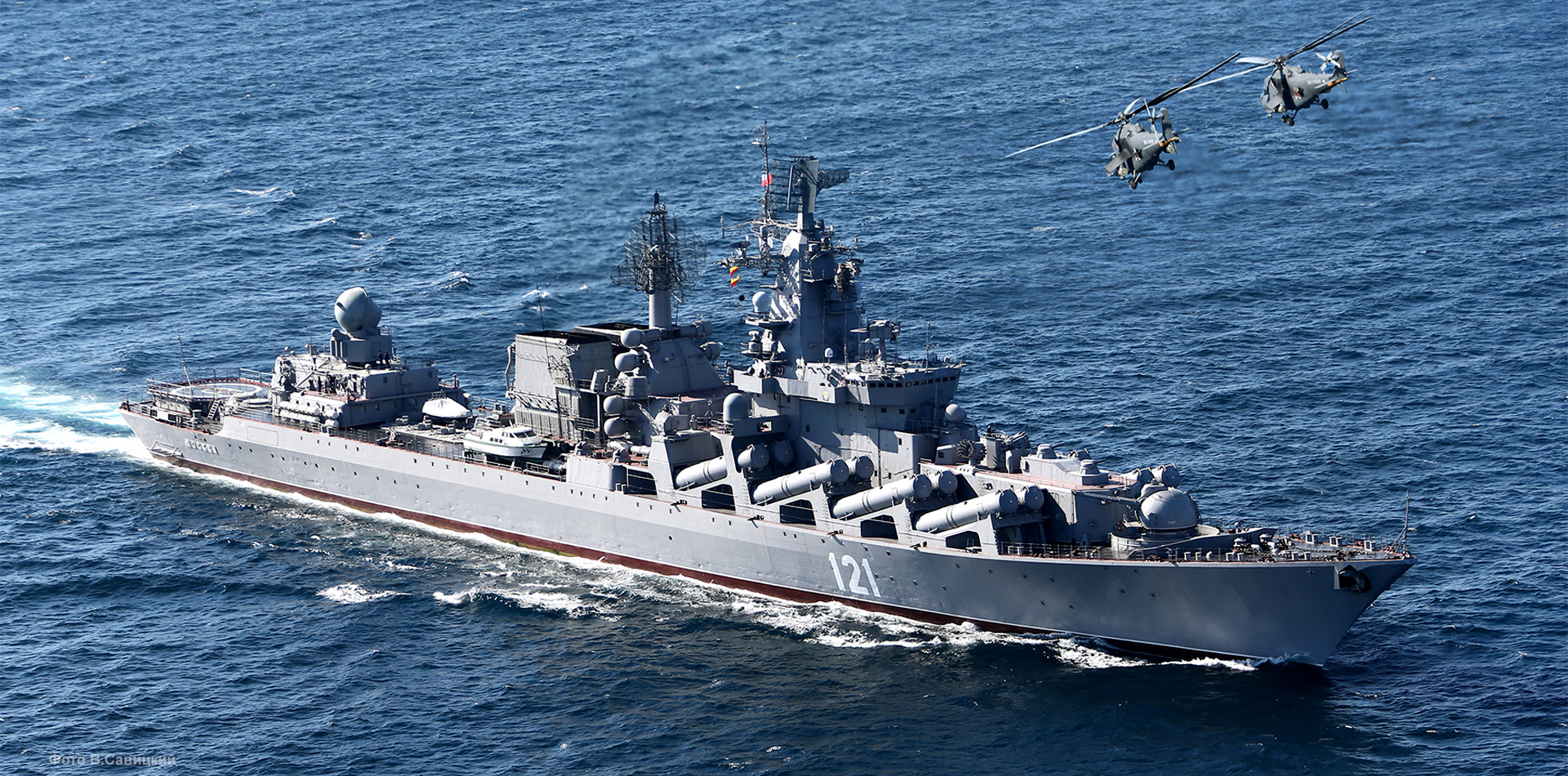
- Moskva seen from the air in 2012

History

→ Soviet Union → Russia
- Name: Slava (in Soviet service), Moskva (from 1995)
- Namesake: Glory (1979–1995), Moscow (1995–2022)
- Builder: 61 Kommunara Shipbuilding Plant (SY 445), Nikolayev, Ukrainian SSR
- Laid down: 1976
- Launched: 27 July 1979
- Commissioned: 30 January 1983
- Decommissioned: September 1990
- Reinstated: April 2000
- Identification: 121
- Fate: Sunk by two Ukrainian R-360 Neptune anti-ship missiles on 14 April 2022 (Ukrainian claim) (Note: Not acknowledged by the Russian government, cause of catastrophic damage disputed by Russian netizens.); Sunk because of the accidental onboard fire on the ammunition storage that caused the ammunition explosion (Russian claim)
- Notes: Former flagship of the Black Sea Fleet

General characteristics
- Class & type: Slava-class cruiser
- Displacement: 9,380 tons standard; 11,490 tons full load
- Length: 186.4 m (611 ft 7 in)
- Beam: 20.8 m (68 ft 3 in)
- Draught: 8.4 m (27 ft 7 in)
- Speed: 32 knots (59 km/h; 37 mph)
- Complement: 419 enlisted men and 66 officers
- Armament: Missiles: 16 (8 × 2) P-1000 Vulcan (SS-N-12 Sandbox) anti-ship missiles; 64 (8 × 8) S-300F Fort (SA-N-6 Grumble) long-range surface-to-air missiles; 40 (2 × 20) OSA-M (SA-N-4 Gecko) SR SAM; Guns: 1 × twin AK-130 130 mm/L70 dual purpose guns; 6 × 1 AK-630 close-in weapons systems; Torpedoes and others: 2 × 12 RBU-6000 anti-submarine mortars; 10 (2 × 5) 533 mm torpedo tubes
- Armour: Splinter plating
- Aircraft carried: 1 Ka-25 or Ka-27 helicopter

Moskva, (Note: Russian: Москва, IPA: [mɐˈskva], lit. 'Moscow'.) formerly Slava, (Note: Russian: Слава, IPA: [ˈslavə], lit. 'Glory'.) was a guided missile cruiser of the Russian Navy. Commissioned in 1983, she was the lead ship of the Project 1164 Atlant class, named after the city of Moscow. With a crew of 510, Moskva was the flagship of the Black Sea Fleet.

The cruiser was deployed during the Russo-Georgian War and 2014 Russian annexation of Crimea, and Russia's intervention in Syria (2015). She led the naval assault during the Russo-Ukrainian war, from February 2022 until her sinking on 14 April 2022.

== History ==
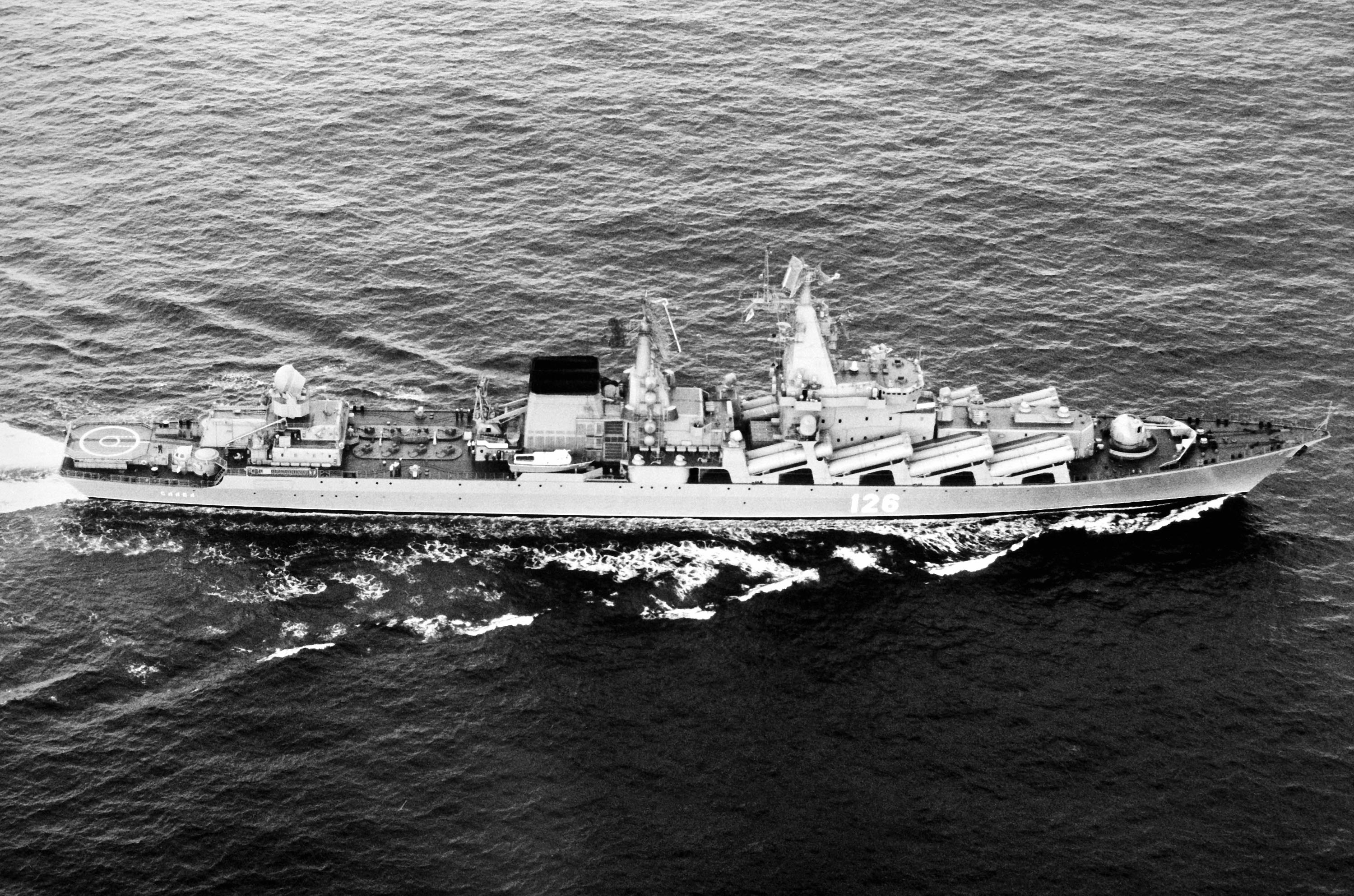
Slava c. 1983

=== As Slava ===
Slava was laid down in 1976 in Shipyard 445 of the 61 Kommunara Shipbuilding Plant in Mykolaiv, Ukrainian SSR, launched in 1979, and commissioned into the Soviet Navy on 30 January 1983. Between 18 and 22 November 1986, the ship visited the Greek port of Piraeus.

Slava played a role in the Malta Summit (2–3 December 1989) between Soviet leader Mikhail Gorbachev and US President George H. W. Bush. She was used by the Soviet delegation, while the US delegation had their sleeping quarters aboard USS Belknap. The ships were anchored in a roadstead off the coast of Marsaxlokk. Stormy weather and choppy seas resulted in some meetings being cancelled or rescheduled, and gave rise to the moniker the "Seasick Summit" among international media. In the end, the meetings took place aboard Maxim Gorkiy, a Soviet cruise ship anchored in Marsaxlokk Bay.

Slava returned to Mykolaiv in December 1990 for a refit that lasted until late 1998. On 15 May 1995, the ship was formally renamed Moskva.

=== As Moskva ===
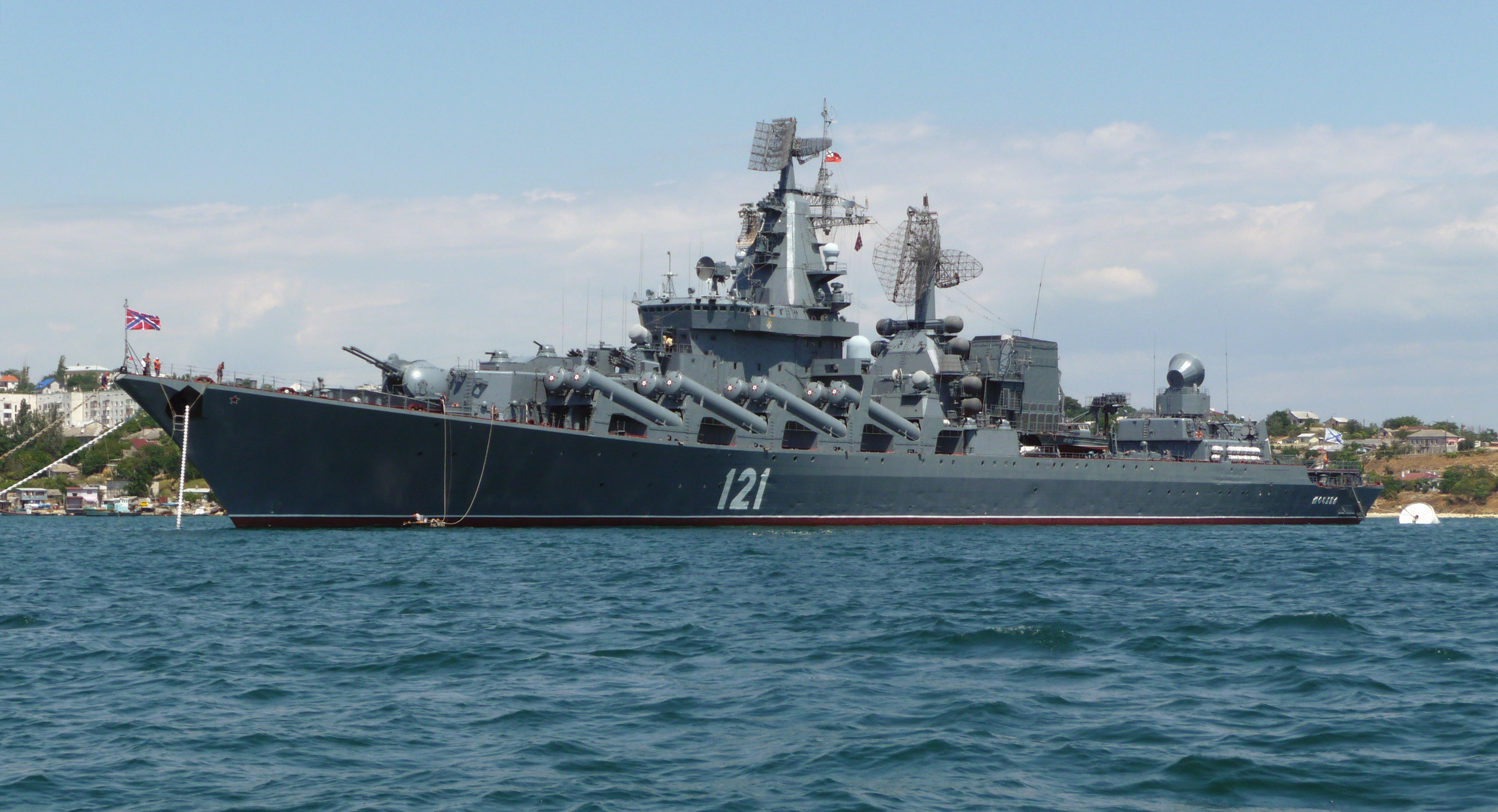
Moskva in 2009

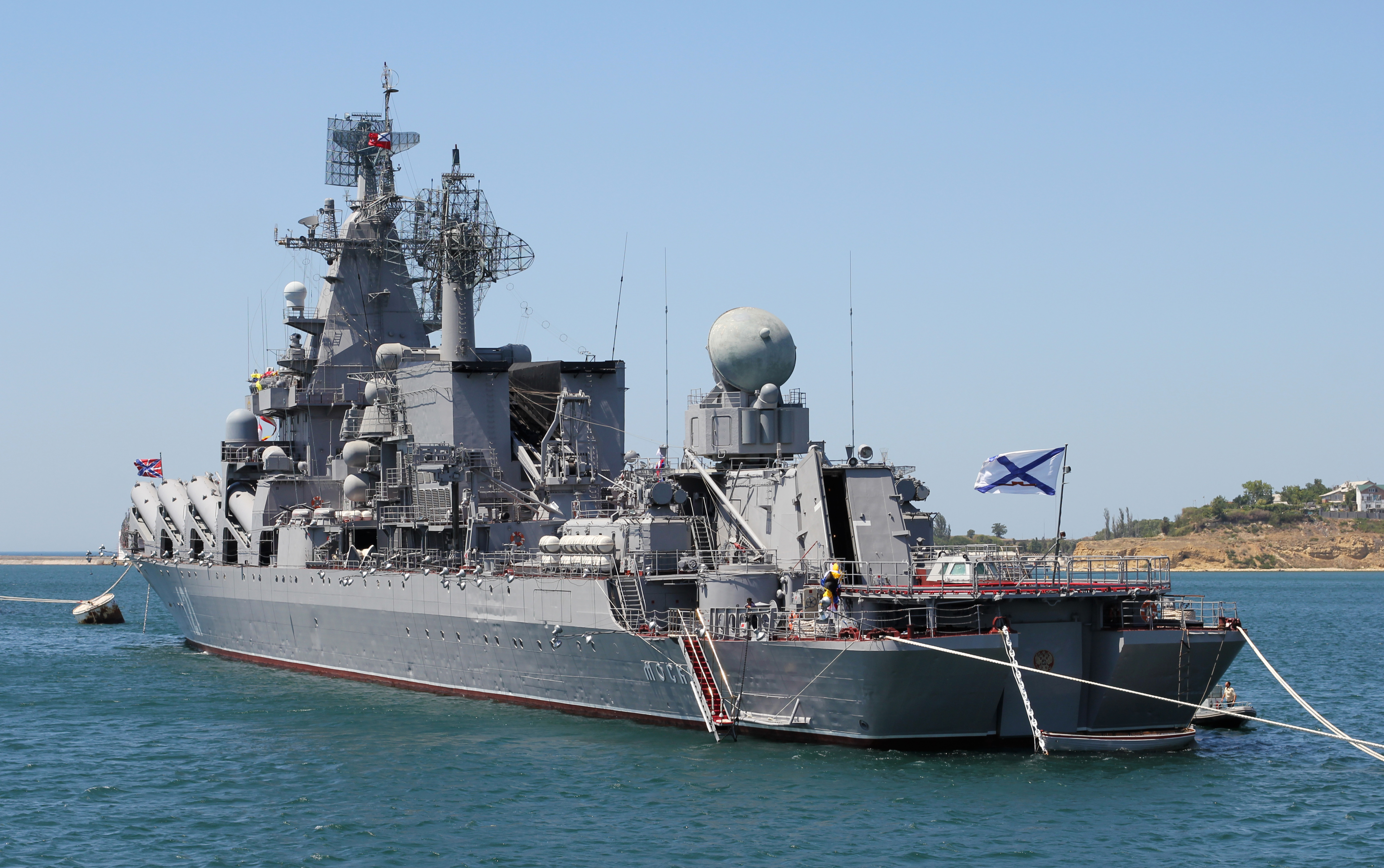
Moskva in 2012

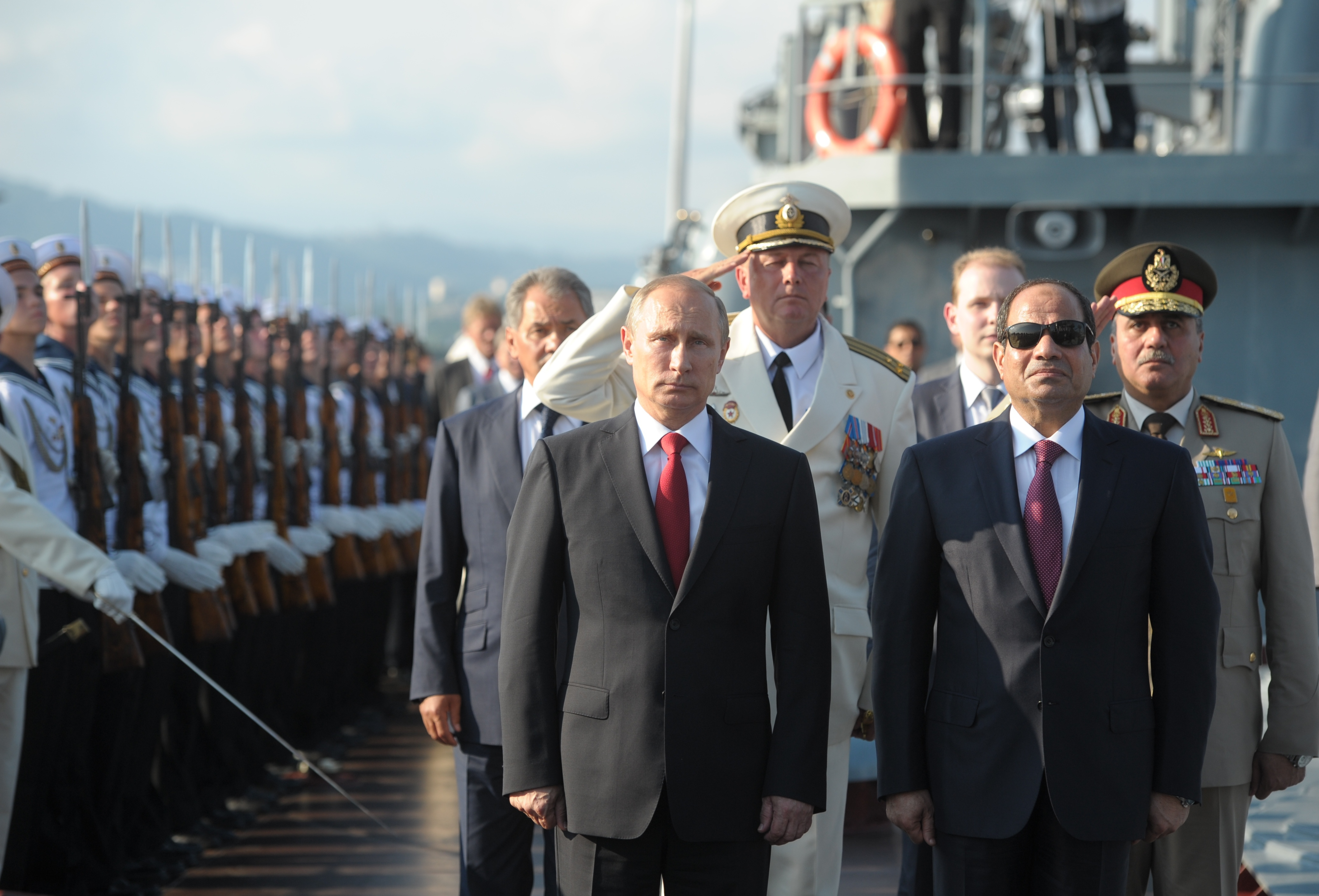
President Vladimir Putin with Egyptian President Abdel Fattah el-Sisi and Russian Defense Minister Sergei Shoigu aboard the missile cruiser Moskva, August 2014

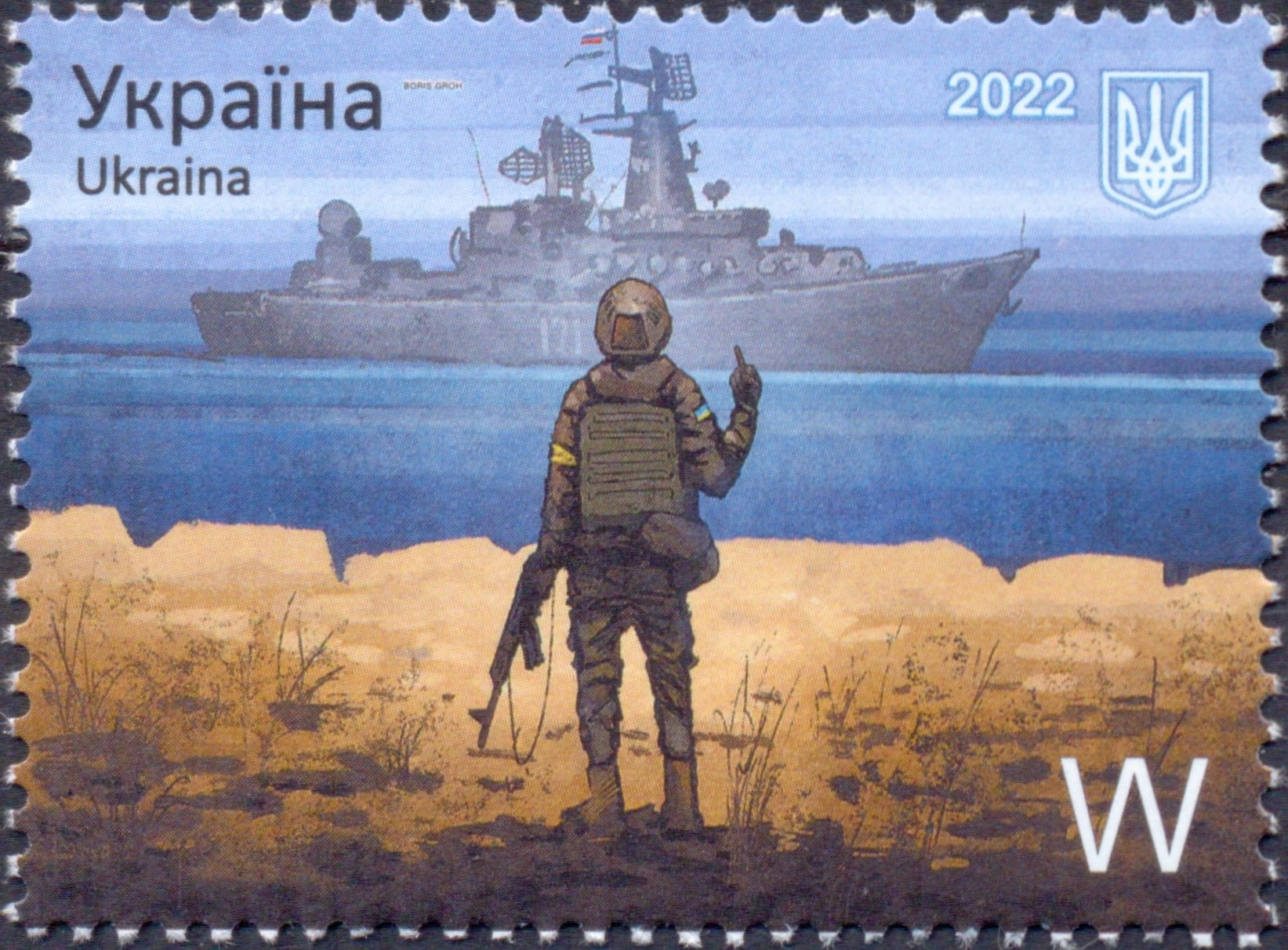
"Russian warship, go fuck yourself" stamp issued by the Ukrainian government starting in 2022, depicting the Moskva in the background

Recommissioned into the Russian Navy in April 2000, Moskva replaced the Kynda-class cruiser Admiral Golovko as the flagship of the Russian Black Sea Fleet.

In early April 2003, Moskva, along with the frigate Pytlivyy, Smetlivy, and a landing ship departed Sevastopol for exercises in the Indian Ocean with a Pacific Fleet task group (Marshal Shaposhnikov and Admiral Panteleyev) and the Indian Navy. The force was supported by the Project 1559V tanker Ivan Bubnov and the Project 712 ocean-going tug Shakhter.

Moskva visited Malta's Grand Harbour in October 2004, and the Ensemble of the Black Sea Fleet performed at a concert at the Mediterranean Conference Centre in Valletta for the occasion. In 2008 and 2009, she visited the Mediterranean and participated in naval drills with the ships of the Northern Fleet.

In August 2008, in support of the Russian invasion of Georgia, Moskva was deployed to secure the Black Sea. During a brief surface engagement, the Georgian Navy scored one missile hit on Moskva before being overwhelmed. After Russia's recognition of Abkhazia's independence, the ship was stationed at the Abkhazian capital, Sukhumi.

In April 2010 it was reported that Moskva would join other navy units in the Indian Ocean to conduct exercises. In August 2013 the cruiser visited Havana, Cuba.

In late August 2013, Moskva was deployed to the Mediterranean Sea in response to the build-up of US warships along the coast of Syria. During the Russian invasion of Crimea in 2014, Moskva blockaded the Ukrainian fleet in Donuzlav Lake.

On 17 September 2014, Moskva was deployed to the Mediterranean Sea, taking shift from guard ship Pytlivy.

In July 2015, Moskva visited Luanda, to strengthen military cooperation with Angola. From the end of September 2015, while in the eastern Mediterranean, the cruiser was charged with the air defences for the Russian aviation group based near the Syrian town of Latakia that conducted the air campaign in Syria. On 25 November 2015, after the 2015 Russian Sukhoi Su-24 shootdown, it was reported that Moskva, armed with the S-300F surface-to-air missile system, would be deployed near the coastal Syria-Turkey border. In 2016, she was replaced by sister ship Varyag in the eastern Mediterranean Sea. On 22 July 2016 Moskva was awarded the Order of Nakhimov.

Upon return from her deployment in January 2016, Moskva was to undergo a refit and upgrade but due to lack of funds her future remained uncertain as of July 2018.

In June 2019, Moskva left the port of Sevastopol in the Black Sea to test her combat systems and main propulsion.

In February 2020, Russian Orthodox officials said that a very rare and important Christian relic purported to be a part of the True Cross on which Jesus was crucified was to be placed aboard the ship.

On 3 July 2020, Moskva completed two and a half months of repairs and maintenance intended to allow her to remain in service until 2040. The first post-repair deployment was scheduled for August 2020; however, in reality, she only began to prepare for the deployment in February 2021. She was at sea on exercises in March 2021, and fired the new Vulkan anti-ship missiles in April 2021.

=== Russian invasion of Ukraine ===
==== Snake Island campaign ====
Moskva, the flagship of the Russian Black Sea Fleet, helped lead the naval assault during the 2022 Russian invasion of Ukraine from February until April 2022. She was the most powerful surface vessel in the Black Sea region at the time, and Ukraine's only threat against it were a limited number of Neptune missiles.

In February 2022, the cruiser left Sevastopol to participate in the attack on Ukraine. The ship was later used against the Ukrainian armed forces during the attack on Snake Island, together with the Russian patrol boat Vasily Bykov. Moskva hailed the island's garrison over the radio and demanded its surrender, and was told "Russian warship, go fuck yourself". After this, all contact was lost with Snake Island, and the thirteen-member Ukrainian garrison was captured. Slava-class cruisers are built for both air and sea superiority, and have no land-attack missiles. Moskva mainly stayed behind other Russian warships, providing air cover for military demonstrations of amphibious landings with Odesa as the apparent target.

==== Sinking ====
External image
- Moskva on fire and listing to port

In the late hours of 13 April 2022 Ukrainian presidential adviser Oleksiy Arestovych reported Moskva was on fire and Odesa governor Maksym Marchenko said their forces hit Moskva with two R-360 Neptune anti-ship missiles. A radar image showed the ship was about 80 nautical miles (150 km) south of Odesa around 19:00 local time (GMT+3), shortly after the damage occurred. Two reports indicated the ship sank before 03:00, 14 April.

The Russian Ministry of Defence initially reported that a fire caused a munitions explosion, and the ship sank in stormy seas while being towed to port. Moskva is the largest warship to be sunk in combat since the ARA General Belgrano in the 1982 Falklands War, and the largest Russian warship to be sunk since World War II. It was also the first Russian flagship to be sunk since the Russo-Japanese War which ended in 1905.

According to the Lithuanian defense minister Arvydas Anušauskas, there were 485 crew members aboard, including 66 officers. He also said that a Turkish ship responded to a distress call and saved 54 crew members at 2 a.m. local time. Russia stated one sailor from the Moskva was killed and 27 were missing, while 396 crew members were rescued. In November 2022, after families demanded information, a Russian court in Crimea acknowledged the deaths of a further 17 sailors, mostly conscripts. A Russian recruitment office mistakenly sent conscription papers to a missing Moskva sailor in October 2022. Meanwhile, Oleksiy Danilov, former secretary of the National Security and Defense Council of Ukraine, claimed on 22 April 2022 that out of a complement of 510 crew members, only 58 had been rescued.

According to Andrii Bulavin, one of the authors of the book The Hunt for the Moskva Cruiser, the ship's crew consisted of "approximately" 496 to 512 people, but he also added that the cruiser may have had a marching headquarters of 30 to 40 soldiers and a company of guards on board. Additionally, he also mentioned unverified open-source claims of two 350-kiloton nuclear warheads on board the ship at the time of the sinking, but said he was unable to confirm or deny these claims. (Note: The Vulcan and Basalt missiles carried by the ship would have been capable of carrying said warheads.)

Ukraine has officially declared the wreck of the ship to be an underwater cultural heritage site.

American officials told NBC News and The New York Times that the US had provided real-time intelligence that helped Ukraine to target and sink the Moskva, although the Biden administration refused to publicly confirm those statements.

In January 2026 the 2nd Western District Military Court in Moscow finally acknowledged that Ukraine had sunk the Moskva, publishing an in absentia sentence against Colonel Andriy Shubin, commander of the Ukrainian Navy’s 406th Artillery Brigade, for sinking the ship, accusing him of "international terrorism" as the court described Moskva's operations in the Black Sea as a "humanitarian mission". The court ruling for the first time not only officially confirmed the ship sinking but also the number of casualties ("20 crew members died from the explosion, fire, and smoke, further 24 crew members sustained injuries and eight went missing"). Shortly after Russian independent media published these details, the document was removed from the court’s website.
