= Project 22870 tugboat =

Russian tug boat class

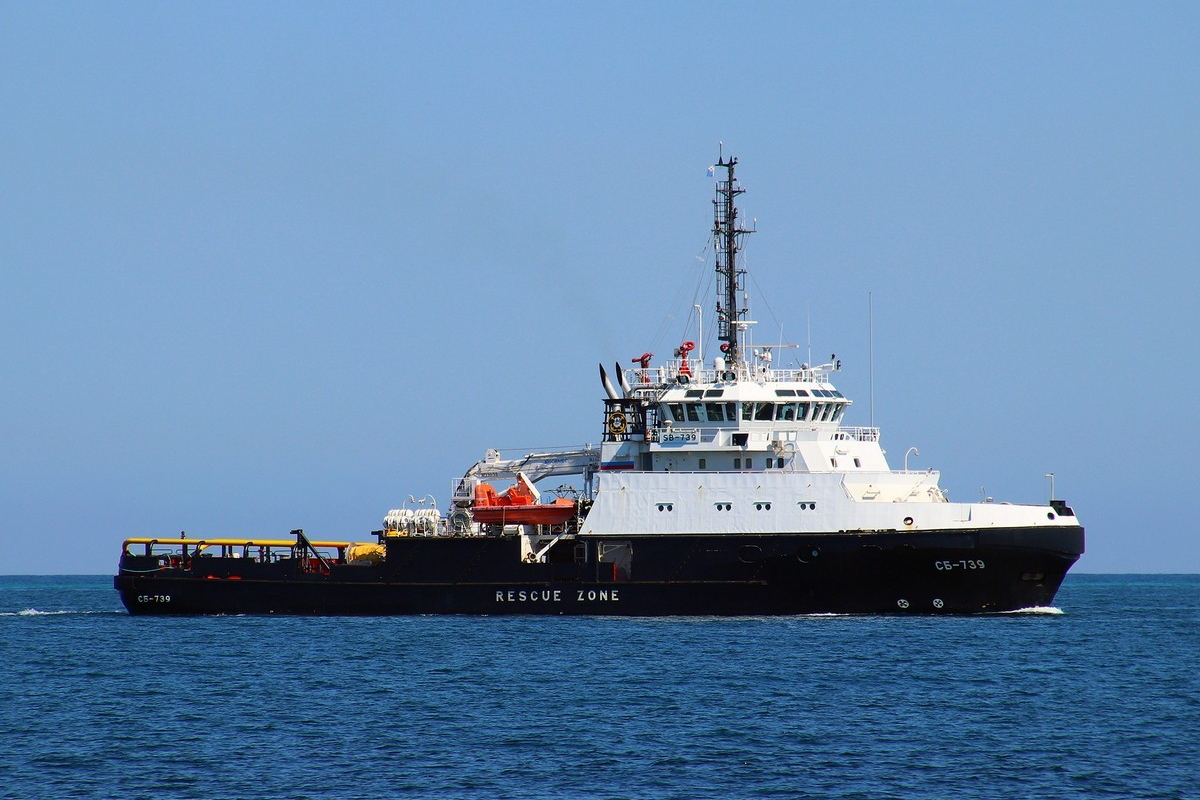
- Spasatel Vasily Bekh in 2021

Class overview
- Name: Project 22870
- Builders: Zvezdochka Shipyard, Astrakhan
- Operators: Russian Navy
- Built: 2011–present
- In commission: 2014–present
- Planned: 7
- Completed: 7
- Active: 6
- Lost: 1

General characteristics
- Type: Rescue tug
- Displacement: 1,200 tonnes (standard load); 1,670 tonnes (full load)
- Length: 57 m (187 ft 0 in)
- Beam: 14 m (45 ft 11 in)
- Draught: 3.2 m (10 ft 6 in)
- Propulsion: 2 × KL6538-AS06 electric motors (2 × 2,720 PS or 2,680 shp); 3 × 1,520 kW diesel generators; 2 × 200 kW diesel generators; 2 × 100 kW diesel generators; 2 × Azipod units; 2 × bow thrusters
- Speed: 14 kn (26 km/h; 16 mph)
- Endurance: 20 days
- Complement: 26

Project 22870 is a series of rescue tugs in service with the Russian Navy designed by the Vympel Design Bureau, intended for towing ships in distress, fire fighting, medical evacuation, and rescue operations.

== Operational history ==
During the Russian invasion of Ukraine, the tugboat Spasatel Vasily Bekh was hit and sunk on 17 June 2022 by two anti-ship missiles fired by Ukrainian forces. The vessel was allegedly transporting weapons and ammunition to Snake Island, which was occupied by Russian forces at the time.

== Ships ==
Name	Builder	Laid down	Launched	Commissioned	Fleet	Status
SB-45	Zvezdochka Shipyard	2011	24 May 2013	27 June 2014	Caspian Flotilla	Active
Professor Nikolay Muru (ex-SB-565)	Zvezdochka Shipyard		20 May 2014	28 December 2014	Black Sea Fleet	Active
SB-738	Zvezdochka Shipyard		21 May 2015	4 July 2016	Caspian Flotilla	Active
Spasatel Vasily Bekh (ex-SB-739)	Zvezdochka Shipyard		2 August 2016	16 January 2017	Black Sea Fleet	Sunk 17 June 2022 during the Russo-Ukrainian War
Capitan Guryev	Zvezdochka Shipyard	27 January 2016	18 May 2018	5 December 2018	Black Sea Fleet	Active
SB-742	Zvezdochka Shipyard	27 October 2016	22 May 2019	19 December 2019	Black Sea Fleet	Active
Mikhail Chekov	Zvezdochka Shipyard	25 March 2021	21 May 2024	29 December 2025	Black Sea Fleet	Active

== See also ==
- List of active Russian Navy ships
- Future of the Russian Navy
