= Russian patrol ship Vasily Bykov =

Patrol ship of the Russian Black Sea Fleet

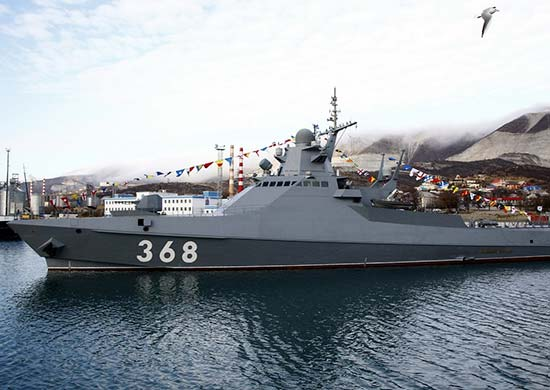
- Vasily Bykov at the Novorossiysk Naval Base in Novorossiysk in 2022

History

Russia
- Name: Vasily Bykov
- Builder: Zelenodolsk Shipyard
- Laid down: 26 February 2014
- Launched: 28 August 2017
- Commissioned: 20 December 2018
- Status: Active

General characteristics
- Class & type: Project 22160
- Complement: 80
- Armament: 1 × 76.2 mm AK-176MA automatic dual-purpose gun; 2 × 14.5 mm MTPU machineguns; DP-65 10 barreled anti-saboteur automatic grenade launcher system; DP-64 2 barreled anti-saboteur grenade launcher system; A variety of module containers including weapon modules containing 324 mm Paket-NK torpedoes, 3M24, Kalibr-NK cruise missiles and 9M331M surface-to-air missiles
- Aircraft carried: 1 x Ka-27 or Ka-226

Vasily Bykov (Russian: Василий Быков) is a project 22160 patrol ship of the Russian Navy, of which it was the first ship built. It was laid down on 26 February 2014 on the Zelenodolsk Shipyard at Zelenodolsk in Tatarstan, Russia, and launched on 28 August 2017. Vasily Bykov was commissioned on 20 December 2018 in the Novorossiysk Naval Base at Novorossiysk, becoming part of the Black Sea Fleet.

== Operational history ==
Vasily Bykov, along with the Slava-class cruiser Moskva, took part in the attack on Snake Island on 24 February 2022 during the first day of the 2022 Russian invasion of Ukraine. The island was bombarded with the ships' guns before Russian Naval Infantry landed. The confrontation ended with the Russian takeover of Snake Island.

On 7 March 2022, the Ukrainian authorities claimed that the Armed Forces of Ukraine had attacked Vasily Bykov using a shore based multiple rocket launcher system off the coast of Odesa, stating that the ship had been heavily damaged or even sunk. However, on 16 March 2022, Vasily Bykov was seen returning to the Sevastopol Naval Base of the Russian Black Sea Fleet in Sevastopol, with no damage visible. According to The Drive, the Moldovan-flagged tanker MV Millennial Spirit, which was still burning after having been shelled by a Russian warship on 25 February 2022 and located twelve miles (19 km) from the Ukrainian port of Yuzhne, could have been mistakenly interpreted by Ukrainian officials as the Vasily Bykov. On 14 April 2022, the ship the Vasily Bykov had attacked Snake Island with, the Moskva, was sunk, and on 30 June, the Russian army retreated from Snake Island.

In June 2022, Vasily Bykov was for the first time equipped with a self-contained fighting module of the Tor-M2KM air-defence system, installed on its helicopter deck.

On 1 August 2023, the Ministry of Defence of Russia claimed that a Ukrainian attack with three naval drones on Vasily Bykov and another Russian Project 22160 patrol ship, Sergey Kotov, had been repelled. It also accused Ukraine of having attempted to attack Russian civilian vessels in the southwestern part of the Black Sea with naval drones. Ukrainian officials rejected both the claims of attacks on Russian civilian and military ships. On 13 August, Russia announced that Vasily Bykov had opened warning fire from automatic weapons to stop the Palauan-flagged cargo ship Sukru Okan, which was navigating through the Black Sea, after it failed to respond to a Russian request to inspect it. On 14 September, the Russian Ministry of Defence claimed that Vasily Bykov engaged and destroyed three Ukrainian naval drones. Vasily Bykov and another warship were purportedly escorting two merchant vessels, Yaz and Ursa Major, the latter an alleged arms-runner, heading towards Istanbul. On the other hand, Ukrainian forces claimed that day they had damaged Vasily Bykov.

The ship was claimed to have been attacked, in conjunction with a large-scale Ukrainian drone assault on Novorossiysk, in August 2026. The degree of damage was uncertain.

== See also ==
- "Russian warship, go fuck yourself"
