= Russian tug Spasatel Vasily Bekh =

Russian Navy rescue tug

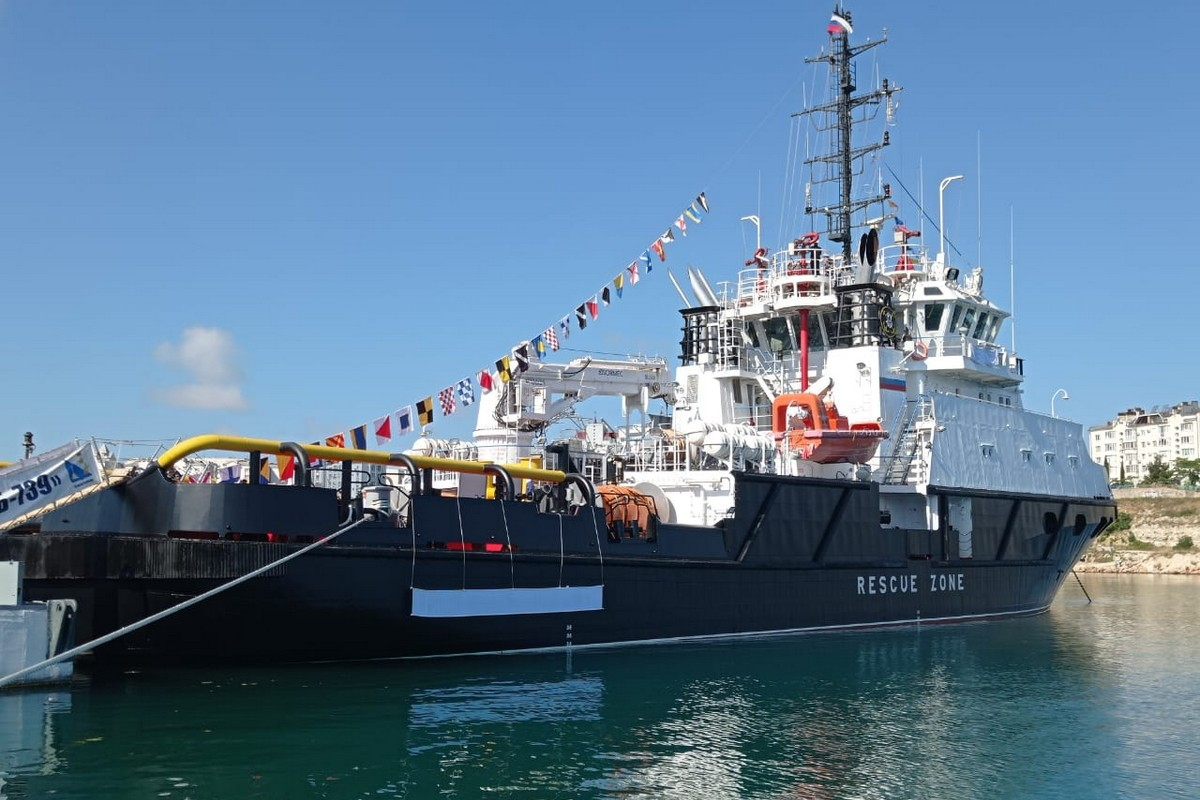
- Spasatel Vasily Bekh (SB-739) in Sevastopol, June 2021

History

Russia
- Name: Spasatel Vasily Bekh
- Operator: Russian Navy
- Yard number: 008
- Launched: 2 August 2016
- Commissioned: 16 January 2017
- Identification: MMSI number: 273542830; Callsign: RJI48
- Fate: Sunk while en route to Snake Island on 17 June 2022 during the Russo-Ukrainian war

General characteristics
- Class & type: Project 22870 rescue tug
- Displacement: 1,200 t (1,200 long tons; 1,300 short tons) standard; 1,670 t (1,640 long tons; 1,840 short tons) full load
- Length: 57 m (187 ft 0 in)
- Beam: 14 m (45 ft 11 in)
- Draft: 3.2 m (10 ft 6 in)
- Propulsion: IEP
- Speed: 14 kn (26 km/h; 16 mph)
- Crew: 26

Spasatel Vasily Bekh (ex-SB-739) was a Project 22870 rescue tug in the Russian Navy that was launched in 2016 and sunk in 2022 during the Russo-Ukrainian war.

== Description ==
Spasatel Vasily Bekh was a rescue tug built to tow ships in distress, fight fires at sea, supply water and electricity to other ships, evacuate injured personnel, and act as a diving rescue platform. It had a crew of 26 and could carry an additional 36 people.

The ship measured 57 m (187 ft 0 in) long, had a beam of 14 m (45 ft 11 in), and a draft of 3.2 m (10 ft 6 in). It had a standard displacement of 1,200 tonnes and 1,670 tonnes when fully loaded. It had a maximum speed of 14 knots (26 km/h; 16 mph) and was capable of operating autonomously for up to 20 days. It was propelled by two Azipod units and two bow thrusters that were powered by two 2,720 PS (2,680 shp; 2,000 kW) electric motors, which were supplied by three main diesel gensets with a combined power output of 4,560 kW (6,120 hp).

== History ==
Spasatel Vasily Bekh was designed in Nizhny Novgorod by Vympel Design Bureau. The ship was laid down at Zvezdochka Shipyard in Astrakhan under the designation SB-739. It was launched on 2 August 2016, commissioned into the Russian Navy on 16 January 2017, and passed its trials later that month.

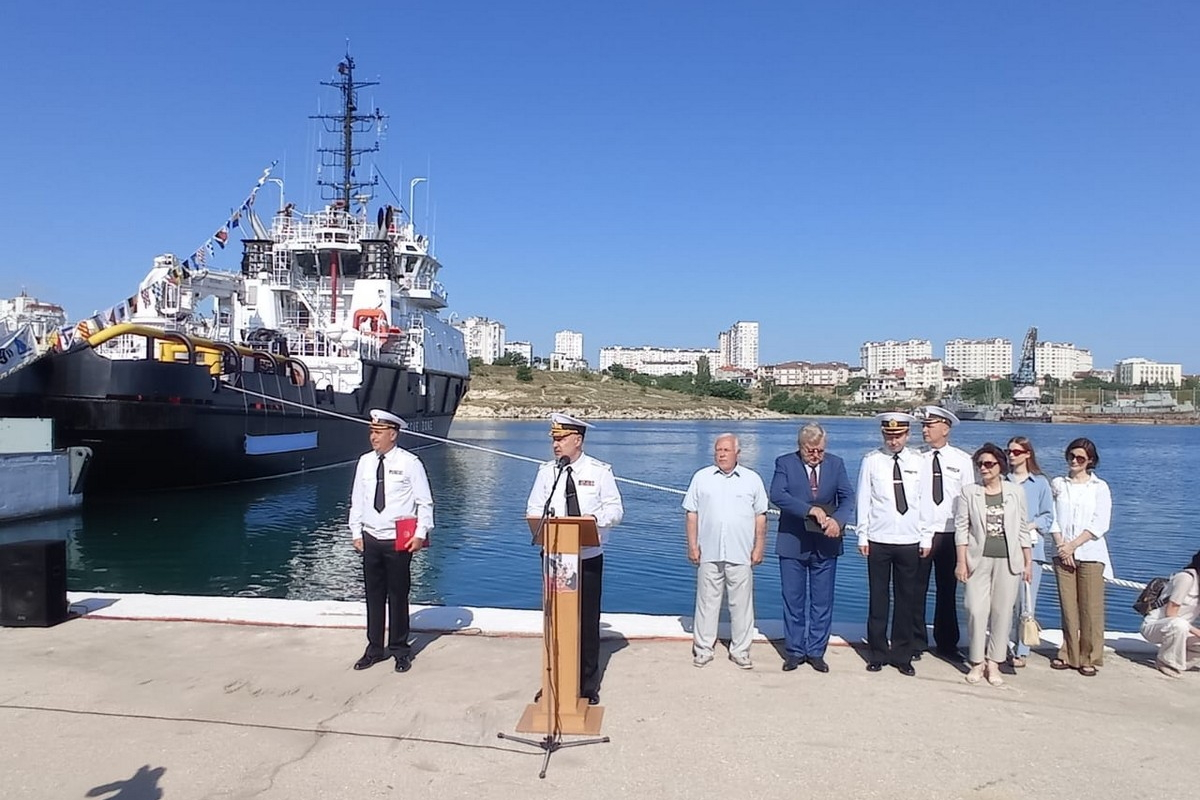
Ensign raising ceremony in honor of the renaming of SB-739 for rescuer Vasily Bekh on June 12, 2021

In March 2017, Spasatel Vasily Bekh was one of four Project 22870 tugs assigned to the Black Sea Fleet, the others being Professor Nikolay Muru, Capitan Guryev, and SB-742. It became part of the 145th Rescue Ship Detachment. The ship was given the name Spasatel Vasily Bekh on 19 April 2021, after the chief engineer of the rescue department of the Black Sea Fleet.

On 17 June 2022, Spasatel Vasily Bekh was carrying personnel, weapons, and ammunition to resupply Russian-occupied Snake Island in the Black Sea. That day, the Ukrainian Ministry of Defense released a video of the attack on the ship taken by a Bayraktar TB2 combat drone. Spasatel Vasily Bekh was struck by two Harpoon anti-ship missiles donated by Denmark in quick succession, causing it to sink shortly thereafter. According to early unconfirmed reports from Russia, 23 of the 33 personnel on board were injured and the other 10 were missing. Shortly after the sinking on 21 June, British military intelligence confirmed the attack, stating that the vessel sunk was almost certainly Spasatel Vasily Bekh, and that it was carrying a Tor anti-aircraft missile system when it sank.

In June 2023 the erection of a memorial at Sevastopol was reported by Russian exile medium Meduza, although the navy never officially admitted the loss of the vessel.
