= 385th Unmanned Surface Vehicles Brigade =

385th Naval Unmanned Surface Vehicles Brigade
- 385-та окрема бригада морських безпілотних комплексів спеціального призначення
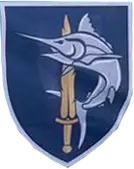
- Brigade Insignia
- Active: 2023-present
- Country: Ukraine
- Branch: Unmanned Systems Forces; Ukrainian Navy (till 2024)
- Type: Brigade
- Role: USV operations
- Part of: USF Command
- Engagements: Russo-Ukrainian War: Russian invasion of Ukraine

The 385th Naval Unmanned Surface Vehicles Brigade is a brigade of the Unmanned Systems Forces.

It was established in August 2023 as a part of Ukrainian Navy, operated by USV operatives from HUR and SBU; they currently retain operational control, as part of the USF command.

The brigade is the world's first and, as of May 2025, the only military unit dedicated to the operation of naval USVs.

== History ==
=== 2022 ===
The existence of Ukrainian USVs has been public knowledge since their first combat use by the Ukrainian Navy in September 2022 during a raid in Sevastopol and since then the USVs have been used on combat on multiple occasions to destroy Russian assets, mostly in the Black Sea.

=== 2023 ===
In August 2023, the brigade was officially established as the first specialized brigade concerned with Unmanned Surface Vehicles in the world and on August 24, the President of Ukraine Volodymyr Zelenskyy presented the newly created brigade with a combat flag.

In August 2023, the Russians created a barricade near the Crimean Bridge to protect it against Ukrainian USVs, but it was destroyed by USVs in November 2023.

On 14 September 2023, two Russian Project 22160 patrol ships were damaged by Ukrainian USVs and in addition to the two patrol ships, the Russian corvette Samum was also hit by Sea Baby USVs with considerable damage being seen in a later video of the ship.

In October 2023, the Project 22160 patrol ship Pavlo Derzhavin was damaged by a Sea Baby USV attack. Similarly the tugboat Mykolai Muru was also damaged by a USV attack in October 2023.

In December 2023 the Russian demining, reconnaissance and hydrographic ship Volodymyr Kozytskyi was damaged by a Ukrainian Sea Baby USV.

Footage of 1 February 2024 attack on Ivanovets

=== 2024 ===
On 1 February 2024, the Main Directorate of Intelligence published a video of the MAGURA V5 attack on the Russian corvette Ivanovets. On February 14, 2024, the large amphibious assault ship Tsezar Kunikov was sunk by Ukrainian MAGURA V5 near Alupka.

On March 5, 2024, the large amphibious assault ship Sergey Kotov was sunk by Ukrainian MAGURA V5 near the Kerch Strait.

On 6 May 2024, Russia released footage of a Ka-29 using gunfire on a Sea Baby USV of the brigade. The drone was armed with a R-73 infrared missile, to defend it from helicopters. One missile appeared to have been fired before it was destroyed by gun fire.

On 30 May 2024, the Main Directorate of Intelligence confirmed the destruction of two Russian boats of the KC-701 Tuna type with the help of MAGURA V5 strike drones.

On June 24, 2024, the Security Service of Ukraine, reported that Sea Baby USVs had laid more than 15 Naval mines near Crimea and these had damaged four Russian warships.

On 10 August 2024, a MAGURA V5 of the brigade destroyed a Russian KS 701 Tunets high-speed boat near the settlement of Chornomorske.

== Personnel ==
The USV operators of the brigade are mostly operatives from the Main Directorate of Intelligence and from the Security Service of Ukraine; the rest of the personnel come from the Ukrainian Navy.

== Equipment ==
The brigade is known to operate several types of USVs including:

Type	Image	Origin	Purpose	Quantity	Production Cost
MAGURA V5		GUR	Surveillance, reconnaissance, patrolling, search and rescue, mine countermeasures, maritime security, and combat missions.	N/A	$273,000
Sea Baby		SBU	Kamikaze and combat operations	N/A	$232,407
MAMAI		SBU	Kamikaze and combat operations	N/A	N/A
Seafox		Denmark	Demining operations	2 vessels	Donated
Chasing M2 Pro		Chasing Innovations	Search and rescue	1 vessel	N/A
