= MT Kairos =

Crude oil tanker

History
- Name: Kairos
- Owner: China
- Port of registry: The Gambia
- Completed: 2002
- Identification: IMO number: 9236004; MMSI number: 629009598; Callsign: C5J700

General characteristics
- Type: Crude oil tanker
- Tonnage: 78,845 GT
- Crew: 25

MT Kairos is a Chinese-owned, Gambian-flagged crude oil tanker.

== 2025 drone attack ==
On 28 November 2025, while approximately 28 nautical miles (52 km; 32 mi) off the coast of Kocaeli Province, Türkiye on route to Russia from Egypt, Kairos as well as the tanker MT Virat were attacked by Sea Baby unmanned surface vehicles operated by the 385th Unmanned Surface Vehicles Brigade, Security Service of Ukraine.

In response to a mayday call, assistance was rendered by the Turkish rescue ship Nene Hatun as well as several boats of the Directorate General of Coastal Safety. The crew of twenty-five were safely evacuated to Kefken with no significant injuries.

Ukraine officially claimed responsibility for the attack.
