= MAGURA V5 =

Ukrainian unmanned boat

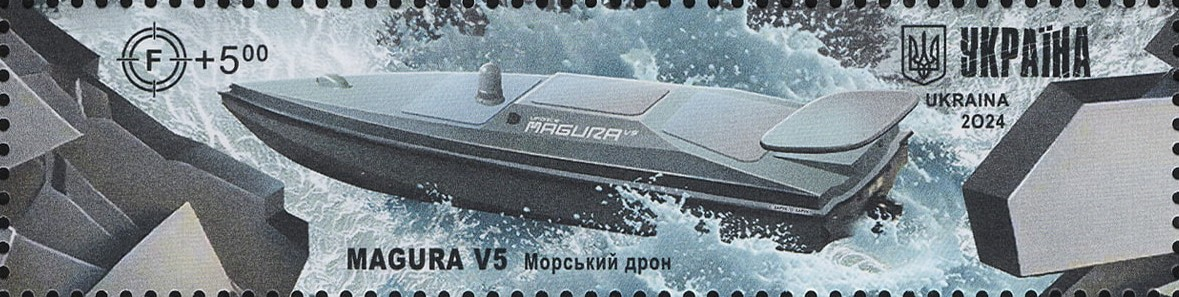
- MAGURA V5 on a 2024 stamp of Ukraine
- Type: Unmanned surface vehicle
- Place of origin: Ukraine

Service history
- Used by: Main Directorate of Intelligence in conjunction with the 385th USV Brigade

Production history
- Unit cost: $273,000
- Variants: See variants

Specifications (MAGURA V5)
- Mass: less than 1,000 kg (2,200 lb)
- Length: 5.5 m (18 ft)
- Main armament: Explosive charge up to 300 kg (660 lb) or Sea Dragon surface-to-air missile (modified R-73 air-to-air missile)
- Operational range: up to 800 km (500 mi)
- Maximum speed: 78 km/h (48 mph)
- Guidance system: GNSS, inertial, visual

MAGURA (Maritime Autonomous Guard Unmanned Robotic Apparatus V-type) (Note: Named after Magura, the goddess of war and victory from Slavic neopagan mythology.) is a class of Ukrainian multipurpose unmanned surface vehicles (USV) developed for use by the Main Directorate of Intelligence of Ukraine (HUR) and capable of performing various tasks: surveillance, reconnaissance, patrolling, search and rescue, mine countermeasures, maritime security, and combat missions. The Magura V5 was introduced in 2023; the Magura V6P and Magura V7 were added in 2025, the latter being armed with various missiles designed to shoot down enemy aircraft.

In July 2026, British-Ukrainian company UForce and US boatbuilder ReconCraft announced a partnership to produce Magura V7 drones in the United States.

== Development ==
HUR signed contracts to design a new USV with private companies who had previously worked with the Security Service of Ukraine (SBU) in designing USVs, however had their partnerships terminated due to disputes with the SBU over project specifications and budget. A new partnership with HUR was formed that started the project which eventually developed the MAGURA V5.

In November 2022, the Ukrainian government announced the development of a Ukrainian combat surface drone with a range of up to 800 km. The boat was first presented at the International Defence Industry Fair, which took place from 25 to 28 July 2023, in Istanbul, Turkey. On 29 July 2023, a CNN report confirmed that the MAGURA V5 kamikaze boat existed not only as an exhibition model but also as an operational system.

Unlike the Sea Baby used by the SBU, which carries a heavier explosive payload and is primarily used to strike stationary targets such as ships docked in port, the smaller and more manoeuvrable MAGURA V5 is designed for striking warships at sea.

Both the MAGURA and Sea Baby were provided to the 385th USV Brigade after its formation as the world's first USV unit in August 2023, although they were still operated by personnel of the HUR and SBU.

A variant armed with AIM-9 Sidewinder missiles modified for surface-to-air operation was developed from January 2025. According to the head of HUR, Lt. Gen. Kyrylo Budanov: "We use a couple of models [of missiles] on our Magura-7, but the best results [come from] the AIM-9." This variant was claimed to have shot down Russian aircraft with Sidewinder missiles in May 2025. The Russian Defense Ministry did not comment, but Russian sources report that the pilots of one fighter were rescued by a cargo ship, whose crew received an award.

It was announced in 2025 that US company Red Cat would produce Magura-7 for the non-inclusive American military market.

In 2026, Ukraine’s combat-tested MAGURA was included in a U.S. manufacturing deal, showing how lessons learned during the war can help improve military technology. It showed that China’s large drone industry cannot replace experience gained on the battlefield. The Japan Times quoted that "Ukraine discovered something China’s factories cannot manufacture and cannot buy: battlefield learning."

== Operational use ==
Main Directorate of Intelligence footage of MAGURA V5 drones striking Russian corvette Ivanovets on 1 February 2024.

In November 2023, in one documented operational use of the drones, one Serna-class landing craft and one Akula-class landing craft docked at a Russian Navy base in Chornomorske, in western Crimea were destroyed.

On 1 February 2024, several MAGURA V5 drones struck and sank the Tarantul-III class missile corvette Ivanovets in the Black Sea near Lake Donuzlav in Crimea.

On 14 February 2024, several MAGURA V5 drones were used to attack and sink the large landing ship Tsezar Kunikov near Alupka in Russian-occupied Crimea. The sinking was confirmed by Russian sources.

On 5 March 2024, MAGURA V5 drones were used in an attack that sank the patrol ship Sergey Kotov near the Kerch Strait.

MAGURA V5 drone targeting Russian Mil Mi-8 helicopter

On 30 May 2024, the HUR claimed the destruction of two Russian boats of the KC-701 Tuna type with the help of Magura V5 strike marine drones.

On 10 August 2024, it destroyed a Russian KS 701 Tunets high-speed boat near the settlement of Chornomorske.

On 31 December 2024, the HUR reported that a MAGURA V5 adapted to fire R-73 air-to-air missiles shot down a Russian Mil Mi-8 helicopter near Cape Tarkhankut, in western Crimea and damage another, which dropped flares during the attack and eventually managed to return to base.

Shootdown of Su-30 fighter jet by MAGURA V7 drone

On 2 May 2025, 50 km (31 mi) west of Novorossiysk, HUR Magura V7 naval drones reportedly shot down two Russian Su-30SM fighter jets using AIM-9 Sidewinder missiles in what was claimed to be the first shootdown of a jet by a maritime drone. Su-30 "Flanker" jets are estimated to cost $50 million each. Ukrainian Defense Intelligence chief Kyrylo Budanov claimed that at least three Magura V7 USVs were used and that, while the crew of the first jet ejected and was recovered by a civilian ship in the Black Sea, the second crew was killed.

On 2 May 2026 during the Balikatan 2026 exercises in the Philippines, Green Berets from the 1st Special Forces Group conducted a high-stakes live-fire mission. A Magura USV was deployed in Batan Island.

On 5 June 2026, a Ukrainian naval drone, a MAGURA V5 as reported by Romanian news TV channel Digi24, citing military sources, exploded in the port of Constanța, Romania. According to the Ukrainian Navy, the drone had lost control after being affected by Russian electronic warfare systems.

The 25th of August 2026, the new MV11 was showcased by its manufacturer as a floating counter-drone battery equipped with 18 Sting interceptors.

== Tactical and technical characteristics ==
Comparison between variants
	MAGURA V5	MAGURA V7
length	5.5 m (18 ft)	7.2 m (23.5 ft)
mass	Up to 1,000 kg (2,200 lb)	Less than 1,300 kg (2,800 lb)
payload capacity	300 kg (660 lb)	650 kg (1,433 lb)
main armament	2× R-73 air-to-air missiles	2× AIM-9 Sidewinder air-to-air missiles or 1× machine gun
battery autonomy	Up to 60 hours	At least 48 hours or up to 7 days with a generator
operational range	800 km (500 mi)	Up to 1,000 km (620 mi)
maximum speed	42 kn (78 km/h; 48 mph)	39 kn (72 km/h; 45 mph)
cruising speed	22 kn (41 km/h; 25 mph)	23 kn (43 km/h; 26 mph)

It is reported by the Ministry of Digital Transformation that the drone is equipped with an autopilot system, video subsystems, night vision equipment, redundant communication modules, and a combat module. It also includes a ground-based autonomous control station, transportation and storage system, and a data centre.

== Variants ==
- MAGURA V5 − Original version.
- MAGURA V6P − Multirole unmanned surface vehicle.
- MAGURA V7 − An enlarged version powered by a 270 hp (200 kW) diesel engine and armed with either a turret-mounted machine gun or anti-aircraft missiles, with the preferred configuration being two AIM-9 Sidewinders.
- MAGURA V11 - the largest version, dedicated to open-ocean operation lasting up to seven days long and equipped with 18 Sting interceptors

== See also ==
- Sea Baby – USV developed for use by the Security Service of Ukraine
- Marichka – Ukrainian autonomous underwater vehicle
- FL-boat – (German Reich)
