= Marichka =

- Type: Autonomous underwater vehicle
- Place of origin: Ukraine

Production history
- Manufacturer: AMMO.Ukraine
- Unit cost: 16 million hryvnias
- Produced: 2023

Marichka (Ukrainian: Марічка) is a Ukrainian-made multi-purpose autonomous underwater vehicle (AUV) capable of performing underwater attack missions, as well as cargo transportation and reconnaissance.

== Development ==
The first successful test of the AUV was announced on August 24, 2023. On August 29, a video of the Marichka's tests was revealed to the public. Marichka is designed to be capable of hitting landing ships, boats, submarines and missile corvettes, as well as coastal fortifications and bridge supports. Outside of strike applications, the AUV can also transport military and civilian cargo, and perform reconnaissance missions.

== Specifications ==
While dormant, the AUV can be activated by timer or via signal. The manufacturer claims that Marichka can be concealed from hydroacoustic search scanners and can withstand electronic warfare countermeasures. Marichka is designed to hit areas of warships beneath the waterline, to maximise efficacy.

Specification	Value
Length	6 metres
Width	1 metre
Operational range	up to 1000 kilometres
Unit cost	16 million hryvnias

== See also ==
- MAGURA V5 - USV developed for use by the Main Directorate of Intelligence of Ukraine (GUR)
- Sea Baby - USV developed for use by the Security Service of Ukraine (SBU)
