= Group 13 (Ukraine) =

- Група 13
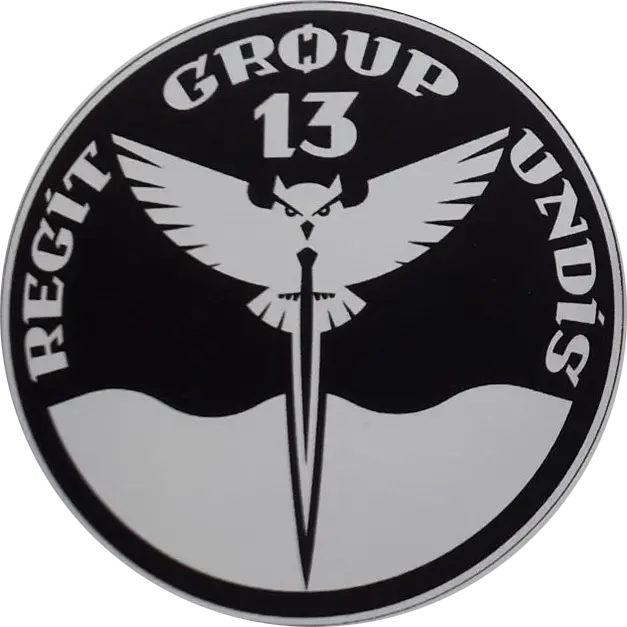
- Group 13 insignia
- Founded: March 2022
- Country: Ukraine
- Branch: Armed Forces of Ukraine
- Type: Unmanned Systems Forces
- Role: Unmanned Surface Vehicle Operations
- Size: Detachment
- Part of: Main Directorate of Intelligence
- Motto: Regit Undis
- Engagements: Russo-Ukrainian War; Russian invasion of Ukraine; Naval warfare in the Russian invasion of Ukraine

Commanders
- Current commander: Callsign: 13th

The Group 13 (Ukrainian: Група 13) is a specialized unmanned systems vehicle unit of the Defense Intelligence of Ukraine. The unit is responsible for operating and maintaining unmanned surface vehicles especially MAGURA V5 for combat purposes and has sunk many Russian vessels in the Black Sea. It was established in its current form in 2022 but its lineage dates back to the Soviet Black Sea Fleet.

== History ==
It saw intensive combat operations during the Russian invasion of Ukraine and was able to destroy or damage over a dozen Russian ships including Ivanovets, Serhii Kotov and Admiral Makarov. At least five vessels have been confirmed to be sunk by the group, those being Ivanovets, Tsezar Kunikov, Serhii Kotov, Serna and Akula. However, the group itself has claimed to have destroyed nine Russian vessels.

=== 2022 ===
On 29 October 2022, Admiral Makarov was damaged in an attack on Sevastopol by several air and sea drones with at least one sea drone striking the ship, reportedly disabling the radar. Satellite footage from 1 November showed Admiral Grigorovich-class frigates believed to include Admiral Makarov moored at Sevastopol. Naval News subsequently reported that little damage had occurred to the warships that were hit by the sea drones, but the attack forced the Russian Navy going into a protective mode, "essentially locking them in port. New defenses were quickly added, new procedures imposed and there was much less activity. Russia's most powerful warships in the war [were by mid-November] mostly tied up in port."

=== 2023 ===
In May 2023, Group 13 damaged Russia's newest reconnaissance ship Ivan Khurs by three USVs. On 1 August 2023, Sergey Kotov was unsuccessfully attacked by the group, three naval drones attacked the Black Sea Fleet patrol vessels Sergei Kotov and Vasily Bykov.

On 14 September 2023, Sergey Kotov was attacked and damaged by a Ukrainian MAGURA V5 unmanned surface vehicle (USV). On 10 November 2023, the group's sea drones attacked and sunk two landing ships near Chornomorske.

Group 13 footage of MAGURA V5 drones striking Russian corvette Ivanovets on 1 February 2024.

=== 2024 ===
On 1 February 2024, Ivanovets was attacked by Group 13 using MAGURA maritime drones. The vessel sustained severe damage to her hull from the detonations from anti-ship missiles and sunk. Although Russia claims the crew was evacuated, the Russian defense ministry did not comment on reports of the ship sinking. The attack took place 12 kilometres (7.5 mi) from Donuzlav and 8 kilometres (5.0 mi) from the village of Okunevka on the Black Sea coast. The loss of the boat cost Russia between 60 and 70 million.

Main Directorate of Intelligence footage of the attack on Tsezar Kunikov by Group 13.

On 14 February 2024, Ukrainian Armed Forces released a statement through Telegram that Group 13 had attacked the Tsezar Kunikov using MAGURA V5 unmanned surface vehicles (USVs) while the ship was off Alupka in Crimea. Loud explosions were reportedly in the region, according to posts on social media. In the statement, the Main Directorate of Intelligence of Ukraine said, "Tsezar Kunikov received a critical breach on the port side and started sinking." The General Staff of the Ukrainian Armed Forces said that Russian rescue operations were not successful and that they believe most of the crew of 87 did not survive. On 5 March 2024, Sergey Kotov was struck and sunk by the group near Feodosia, Crimea, near the Kerch Strait and the HUR posted a video of the attack, at least seven Russian sailors were killed in the strike. In May 2024, it claimed to have sunk two Russian KS-701 landing vessels.

MAGURA V5 drone of the Group 13 targeting Russian Mil Mi-8 helicopter

On 31 December 2024, pilots of the group destroyed air targets for the first time using a Magura V5 destroying an Mi-8 and damaging another near Cape Tarkhankut in Crimea.

== Commanders ==
- Callsign "13th"

== Equipment ==
Type	Image	Origin	Purpose	Quantity	Production Cost
MAGURA V5		GUR	Surveillance, reconnaissance, patrolling, search and rescue, mine countermeasures, maritime security, and combat missions.	N/A	$273,000
