= Russian corvette Bora =

Bora-class corvette of the Soviet Navy

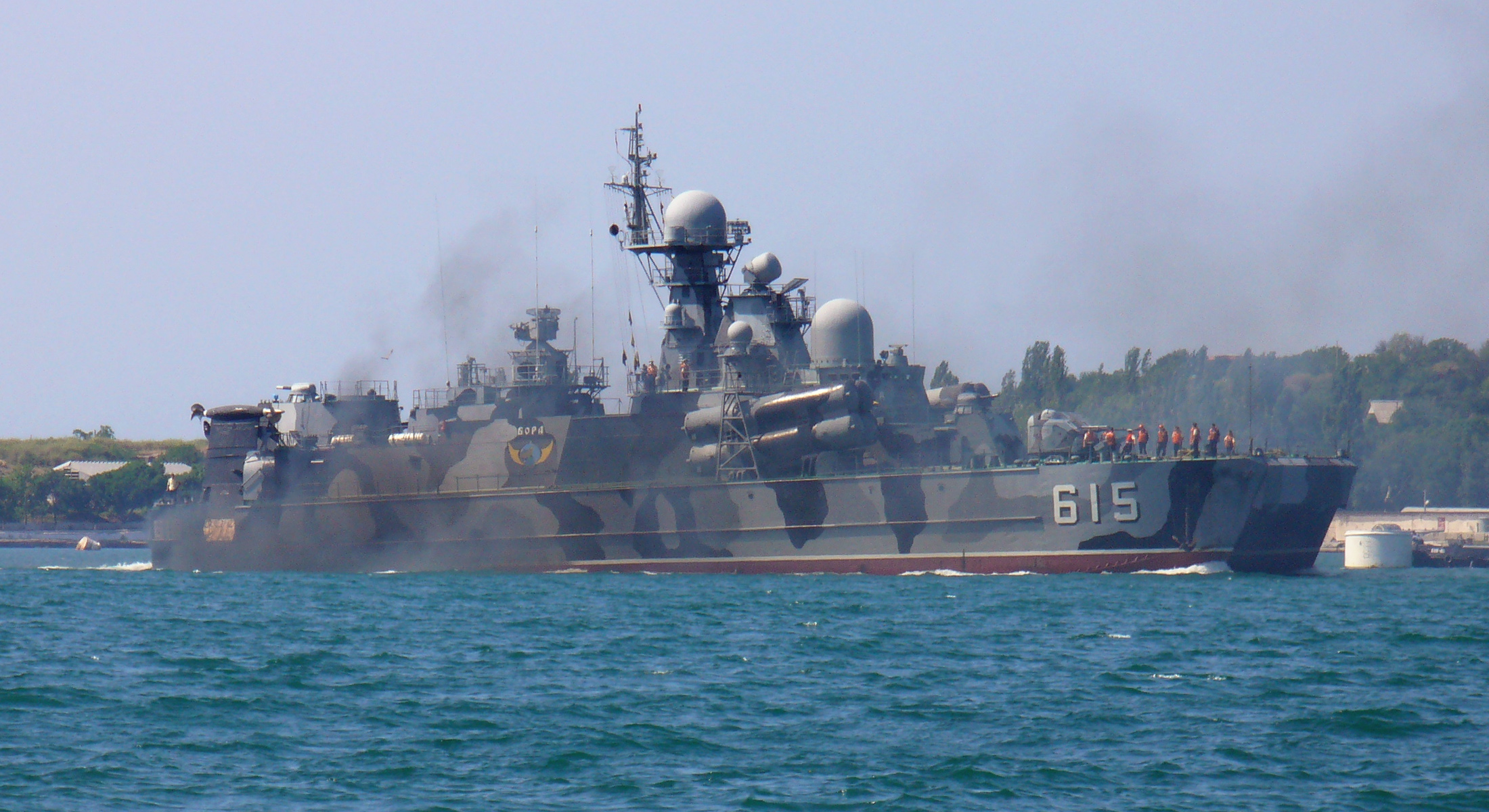
- Bora in 2008

History

Russia
- Name: MRK-27
- Builder: A.M. Gorky Shipyard, Zelenodolsk
- Yard number: 208/501
- Launched: 1987
- Commissioned: 30 December 1989
- Renamed: Bora; (Бора)
- Namesake: Bora
- Identification: See Pennant numbers
- Status: Active

General characteristics
- Class & type: Bora-class corvette
- Displacement: 1,050 tonnes (1,030 long tons)
- Length: 66 m (216 ft 6 in)
- Beam: 17 m (55 ft 9 in)
- Draught: 3 m (9 ft 10 in)
- Installed power: 4 × 200 kW diesel-driven generators
- Propulsion: Twin M10-D1 type gas turbine engines rated at 60,000 hp (45,000 kW) bound to two primary three-blade propellers 2 x GTU (36000 hp, roughly 25.8 MW or few more); Twin M511A reduction gear diesel engines rated at 20,000 hp (15,000 kW) bound to two primary three-blade propellers; Twin M52OM3 auxiliary diesel engines driving superchargers rated at 6,800 horsepower (5,100 kW) used to inflate the skirts
- Speed: 12 knots (22 km/h; 14 mph) cruise; 55 knots (102 km/h; 63 mph) maximum
- Range: 2,500 nmi (4,600 km) at 12 knots; 800 nmi (1,500 km) at 55 knots (102 km/h)
- Endurance: 10 days
- Complement: 35 minimum; 68 combat
- Sensors & processing systems: Monolit-E / Monument-E target detection and designation radar; Pozitiv-ME1 air/surface search radar; 5P-10E Fire Control Radar; Anapa-ME1 sonar; Moskit-E 3Ts-81E missile fire control system; Various cannon and missile guidance and countermeasure systems
- Electronic warfare & decoys: Vympel-R2 suite with Foot Ball-A interceptors; Half Hat-B interceptors; 2 × PK-10 decoy rocket launchers; 2 × PK-16 decoy rocket launchers
- Armament: 2 × Quadruple MT-206ME launchers for 3M-80E "Moskit" marine cruise missiles; 1 × 9K33M "Osa-MA" type surface-to-air missile system for anti-aircraft defense with 20 missiles; 1 × AK–176M automatic 76.2 mm cannon; 2 × AK-630 30 mm anti-aircraft Gatling cannons; 16 × 9K38 Igla man-portable shoulder mounted surface-to-air missile launcher sets; 2 × 14.5 mm naval machine gun mounts; 1 × DP-64 anti-saboteur grenade launcher
- Notes: Combat ready in rough weather up to Sea State 5

Bora (former MRK-27) is a Bora-class corvette of the Soviet Navy and later the Russian Navy.

== Construction and career ==
MRK-27 was launched in 1987 at the A.M. Gorky Shipyard, Zelenodolsk and commissioned on 30 December 1989.

On 19 March 1992, he was renamed Bora. In 1997, she was assigned to the Black Sea Fleet.

The corvette was reported active during the Russo-Ukraine War, but as of mid-2024 had relocated to the eastern Black Sea from Crimea where both she, and her sister ship Samum, had been evidently considered too vulnerable to potential attack.

=== Pennant numbers ===
Date	Pennant number
1993	606
1995	890
1999	575
2000	615
