= AA11 =

AA-11 or AA11 may refer to:

- R-73 (missile), a Russian air-to-air missile (NATO reporting name AA-11 Archer)
- American Airlines Flight 11, a flight that was hijacked and crashed on September 11, 2001
