= Gravehawk =

British surface-to-air missile system designed for Ukraine in 2024

- Type: Surface-to-air missile system
- Place of origin: United Kingdom

Service history
- In service: 2024
- Used by: Ukrainian Armed Forces
- Wars: War in Ukraine

Production history
- Designer: Team Kindred
- Manufacturer: BAE Systems
- Produced: 2024-present
- No. built: 17

Specifications
- Length: 5.90 metres (19.4 ft)
- Width: 2.35 metres (7.7 ft)
- Height: 2.39 metres (7.8 ft)
- Engine: Solid-fuel rocket
- Operational range: 30,000 m (98,000 ft)
- Maximum speed: Mach 2.5 (3,100 km/h; 1,900 mph) (R-73 missile)
- Guidance system: Infrared homing
- Launch platform: Containerized twin-arm missile launcher

Gravehawk is a British short range air defence system that was primarily developed for the Armed Forces of Ukraine during the Russo-Ukrainian War. It was first mentioned as part of a package of military aid in January 2025, before being publicly unveiled a month later. Two prototypes were field tested in September 2024, with a further 15 systems to be delivered. The development was led by Team Kindred, a collaboration between the UK Ministry of Defence and industry partners, with funding also provided by Denmark.

== Characteristics ==
As a short range air defence (SHORAD) system, Gravehawk is primarily designed to counter combat drones, but it can also be used against other low and medium-altitude airborne threats, such as helicopters, loitering munitions and cruise missiles. It is a containerized system, housed in an ISO standard 20 ft (6.1 m) shipping container. This can be loaded onto a wide-range of hook-loading trucks to allow it to be deployed discreetly and rapidly. The system consists of a twin-arm missile launcher and an electro-optical/infrared targeting camera, which is remotely-operated by a crew of five from a concealable portable control unit. To reduce costs and ease logistics, the system is designed to use missiles already possessed by the Armed Forces of Ukraine, specifically the R-73 short-range air-to-air missile. To achieve this compatibility, the system reuses missile launch rails from Ukrainian Su-27 and MiG-29 fighter aircraft.

== History ==
Gravehawk was rapidly developed to meet an urgent operational need to increase Ukraine's air defences following the Russian invasion of Ukraine, particularly to address the threat of Russian drones, loitering munitions and cruise missiles. It was developed over 18 months by Team Kindred, a joint team of the UK Ministry of Defence and industry partners. In September 2024, two systems were built and delivered for field testing at a cost of £6 million, funded by the UK. The positive response to these trials prompted a request from Ukraine for additional systems. According to the Ministry of Defence, another 15 units are planned for delivery at an estimated cost of £14 million, with the costs evenly split between the UK and Denmark.

The system was first showcased to the media in February 2025, after being listed in a package of military aid in January. Official press releases did not disclose the participating industry partners, however a statement from Foreign Secretary David Lammy confirmed the systems were produced by BAE Systems.

Other than the prototypes, as of January 2026 no Gravehawk systems had been delivered.

== Operators ==
=== Current operators ===
Ukraine
- Armed Forces of Ukraine (from 2024; a total of 17 systems to be delivered)

== See also ==
- Raven - another bespoke air defence system developed for Ukraine
