= Sea Baby =

Ukrainian unmanned surface vehicle

- SBU footage of a Sea Baby USV undertaking sea trials in January 2024
- Type: Unmanned surface vehicle
- Place of origin: Ukraine

Service history
- Used by: Security Service of Ukraine in conjunction with the 385th USV Brigade
- Wars: Russo-Ukrainian War

Production history
- Unit cost: 8.5 million hryvnias (equivalent to $245,581 in 2025)
- Produced: 2023-present

Specifications
- Length: 6 m (20 ft)
- Width: 2 m (6.6 ft)
- Height: 0.6 m (2.0 ft) (above waterline)
- Main armament: Explosive warhead (up to 850 kilograms (1,870 lb)) or 6 × RPV-16 thermobaric grenade launchers
- Operational range: at least 1,000 km (620 mi)
- Maximum speed: 90 km/h (56 mph)

The Sea Baby (Ukrainian: Морський малюк, romanized: Mors'kyi malyuk) (Note: The name is a play on words referring to the Head of the Security Service of Ukraine at the time, Vasyl Malyuk. In Ukrainian, malyuk means 'baby'.) is a multipurpose unmanned surface vehicle (USV) developed for use by the Security Service of Ukraine (SBU) during the Russian invasion of Ukraine (2022 to present). It is able to carry an explosive payload for use in self-destruct attacks, or equipped for more specialised uses, for instance to strike static targets such as ships docked in ports, or to lay mines.

Early models of the Sea Baby were designed in July 2022. Models from late 2023 used redundant communications systems and carried explosive warheads up to 850 kilograms (1,870 lb). It was inducted into the 385th USV Brigade in August 2023. In January 2024 the SBU revealed a version of the Sea Baby equipped with thermobaric launchers.

In July 2023, two Sea Baby USVs struck the Crimean Bridge. Other attacks by Sea Baby USVs include a claimed strike on the corvette Samum in September 2023, damage to the Pavel Derzhavin the following month, a strike on the Vladimir Kozitsky in December 2023, and an attack on Crimea in December 2024. On 28 November 2025, Sea Baby USVs were used to attack Russian shadow fleet ships in the Black Sea. In December 2025, the SBU claimed a Kilo-class submarine in the Port of Novorossiysk was struck by an unmanned underwater vehicle dubbed the Sub Sea Baby.

== Background ==
One of the first examples of an attack by an unmanned boat happened in 2020, when a Saudi frigate was bombed by the Houthi rebels using a surface craft loaded with explosives. Before the end of the first year of the Russo-Ukrainian war (2022–present), the Ukrainian military was conducting surprise attacks upon the Russian Black Sea Fleet using USVs.

The Russo-Ukrainian war has been described by scholars as the first "drone war", due to the large scale and high intensity of attacks by drones, and the role of this experience in changing the tactics of modern conventional warfare. Ukraine became the first country to create a military branch exclusively dedicated to drone warfare—the Unmanned Systems Forces—in June 2024, with Russia following soon with its own Unmanned Systems Forces in November 2025. The war has demonstrated how drones have disrupted traditional military doctrines in a manner similar to how gunpowder revolutionized warfare, making them a "decisive" factor in all future conflicts.

== Development ==
The Security Service of Ukraine (SBU) Brigadier General Ivan V. Lukashevych proposed the idea of the agency operating unmanned surface vehicles (or USVs). Early USV models were designed in July 2022 in collaboration with specialists from the Ukrainian Navy and assorted private companies. Later, the SBU decided to develop drones independently, culminating in the Sea Baby design for their own use. What eventually became the MAGURA V5 was later operated by the Main Directorate of Intelligence (GUR). While the GUR's smaller and more manoeuvrable MAGURA V5 is used designed primarily for striking warships out at sea, the SBU developed the Sea Baby with a payload designed primarily to strike static targets such as ships docked in port.

Models of the Sea Baby from late 2023 used several redundant communications systems and carried explosive warheads up to 850 kilograms (1,870 lb), compared to the 108 kilograms (238 lb) payloads of earlier models. Multiple redundant communications systems were used to avoid repeating an incident wherein Starlink-dependent USVs were left stranded during a mission to strike the Russian frigate Admiral Makarov docked at Sevastopol, after connectivity to Starlink in Crimea was declined by the businessman Elon Musk. By the end of year, the Sea Baby had transformed from a self-destroying attack vehicle to a multipurpose platform capable of carrying different loadouts for various tasks, with examples including guided missile launchers and laser guidance systems. In January 2024 the SBU revealed a version of the Sea Baby equipped with six thermobaric launchers based on the RPV-16 design.

== Operational history ==
=== USV attacks ===
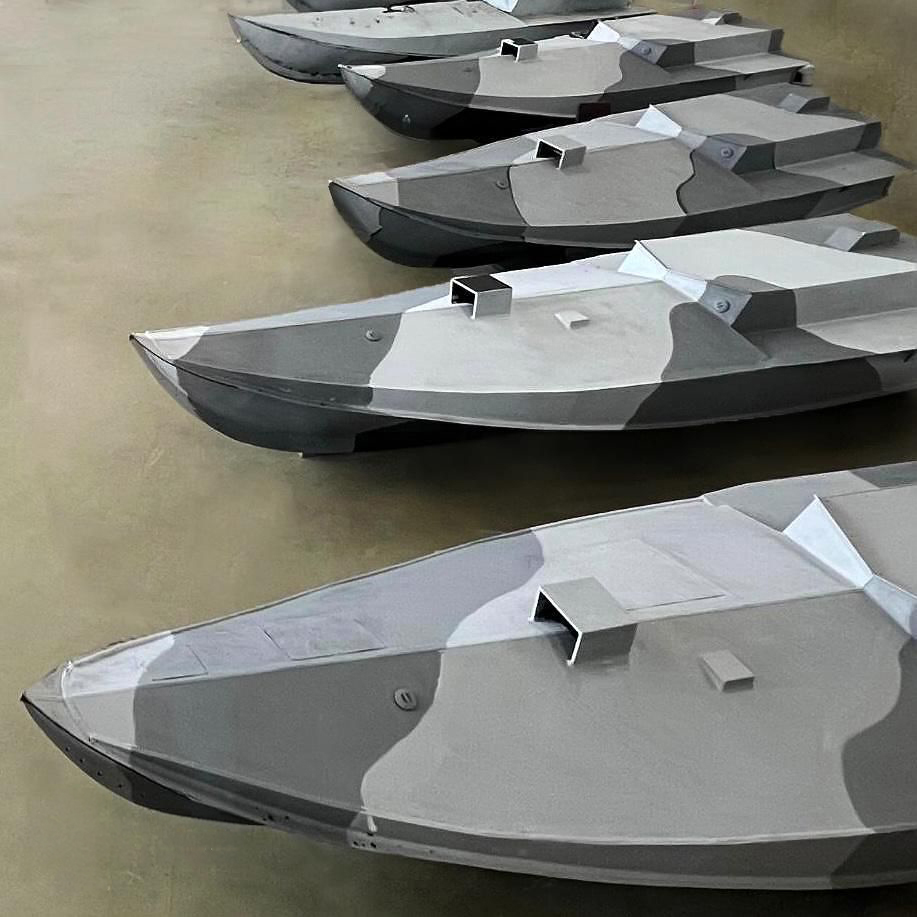
The Sea Baby poster released on 16 August 2023

The MAGURA V5 and Sea Baby were inducted into the 385th USV Brigade after its formation as the world's first USV unit in August 2023, although their operatives were still GUR and SBU.

On 17 July 2023, two Sea Baby USVs struck the Crimean Bridge, causing damage to the abutment and bridge span. The bridge sustained partial damage that temporarily restricted the use of the road section. Following the attack, the SBU showed the device that was used, and revealed its name. In an interview with CNN, Vasyl Malyuk, the Head of the Security Service of Ukraine, stated: "Marine surface drones are a unique development of the Security Service of Ukraine. No private company was involved in this. With the help of these drones, we recently successfully destroyed the Crimean Bridge, the large landing ship Olenegorsky Gornyak and the tanker SIG."

On 14 September the SBU claimed that it struck Russian corvette Samum using a Sea Baby; a video showed the ship visibly listing as it was being towed, as had been the Russian landing ship Olenegorsky Gornyak after being struck by a Sea Baby off the coast of Novorossiysk. In October, the Russian patrol ship Pavel Derzhavin was damaged by a Sea Baby attack. Later in December, the reconnaissance and hydrographic ship Vladimir Kozitsky was struck by a Sea Baby.

On 6 May 2024, Russia released footage of a Ka-29 helicopter using gunfire on a Sea Baby that was armed with an R-73 infrared missile to defend it from such an attack. One missile appeared to have been fired before it was destroyed by gunfire. In December, Ukraine revealed that Sea Baby USVs modified with mounted machine guns had been used in an attack on Crimea. Video footage revealed the Sea Baby using these guns on Russian patrol boats and armed Mi-8 helicopters. The SBU claimed that the Sea Baby USVs were able to damage several helicopters and boats.

Ukraine’s deep strike campaign extends to the maritime domain through unmanned surface vehicles (USVs), notably the Magura and Sea Baby. These systems demonstrate sophisticated solutions for operating in EW-heavy environments... The operational effectiveness of these EW-resilient systems is evidenced by the destruction of approximately one-third of Russia’s Black Sea Fleet, forcing the fleet to withdraw from Sevastopol to Novorossiysk.

— Hague Centre for Strategic Studies (2026)

In June 2024, it was reported by the Wall Street Journal that at least four Russian ships had suffered damage after hitting naval mines that had been laid by Sea Baby USVs off the coast of Crimea. The tactic by the Ukrainians was a response to the construction by the Russians of barriers that blocked the entrance to Sevastopol Bay to seaborne drones.

On 28 November 2025, Sea Baby drones operating in the Black Sea were used to attack two oil tankers belonging to the Russian shadow fleet, MT Kairos and MT Virat, 28 nautical miles (52 km; 32 mi) and 38 nautical miles (70 km; 44 mi) off the coast of Turkey respectively. According to the news website Meduza, Ukraine was accused by the Russian government of "encroaching on Turkey's sovereignty".

According to the Estonian International Centre for Defence and Security, "Ukraine's advancements in maritime drone technology have forced the Russian Black Sea Fleet to shift its operational posture. With the loss of its traditional navy, Ukraine has used maritime drones to turn the tables and compel the Russian fleet to retreat to the eastern Black Sea: the Russian fleet now avoids the western Black Sea entirely."

=== Sub Sea Baby ===
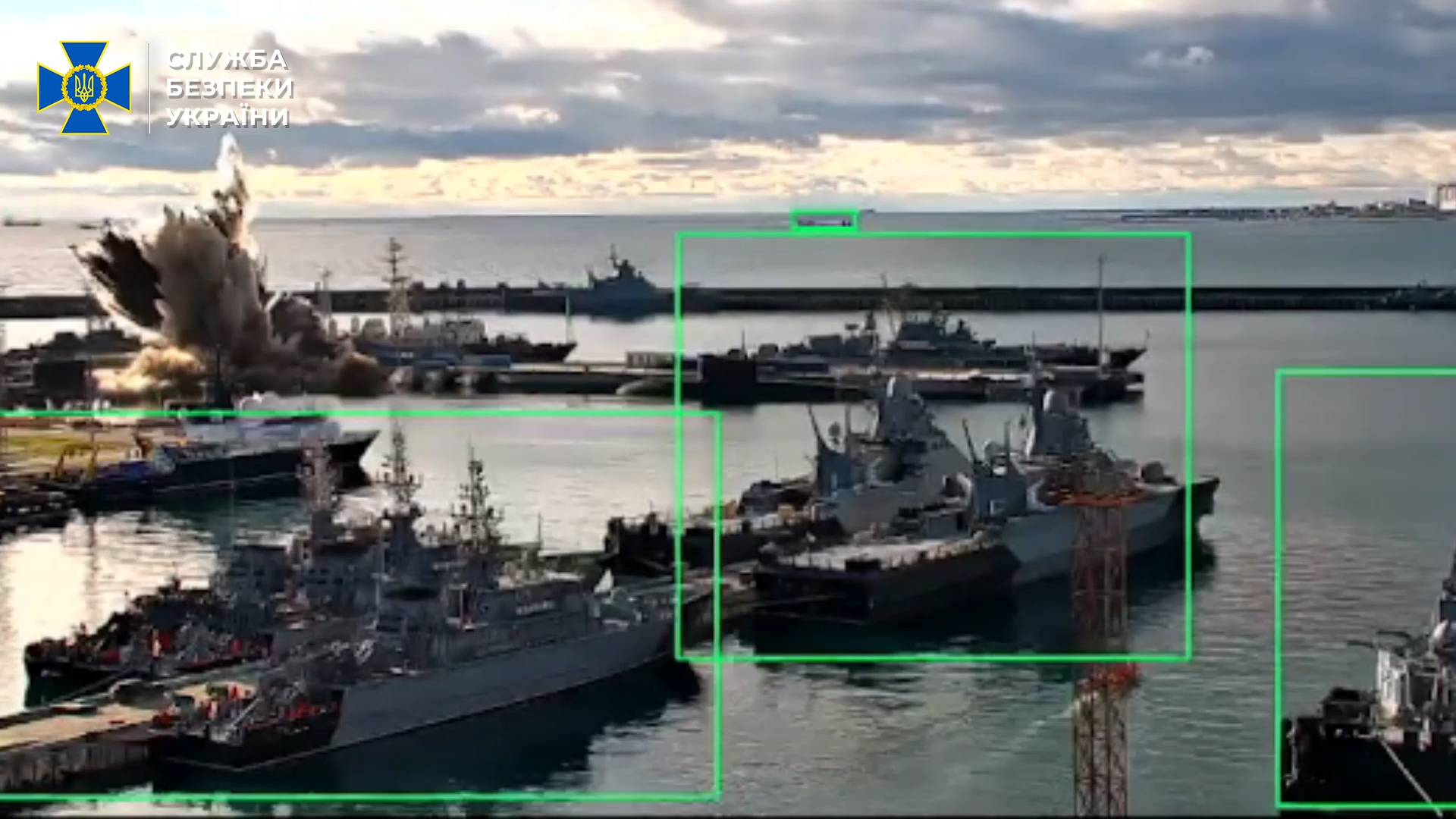
The moment of the strike on the Kilo-class submarine at Novorossiysk in December 2025

In December 2025, the SBU published a video showing an explosion involving a Kilo-class submarine in the Port of Novorossiysk. The SBU claimed that the submarine was struck by a Sub Sea Baby drone—a type that operates completely submerged, like a torpedo. The Russian Ministry of Defense claimed no ships were damaged. The target has been identified as the Kolpino by at least one OSINT source. The UK Ministry of Defence considered it highly likely that the attacked submarine was the B-271 Kolpino. The ministry noted that as of 18 December the submarine was docked where it was attacked, and considered it likely that it had been seriously damaged, leaving it immobilised.

If confirmed, it would be a "landmark moment in naval warfare", the first time an uncrewed underwater vehicle has successfully carried out an attack on a submarine.

== Sources ==
- Bendett, Samuel; Nersisyan, Leonid (2024). "The drone war over Ukraine". The Air War in Ukraine. London: Routledge. doi:10.4324/9781003454120-8. ISBN 978-1-003-45412-0.
- Sweijs, Tim; Tenenbaum, Elie; Feldhusen, Jan; Iven, Markus; Bekkers, Frank (2026). "The Rear and Deep Area". Lessons from the Jungle for the Zoo: Support Ukraine, Help Ourselves: Key Findings Ukraine Visit. Hague Centre for Strategic Studies.
