= Aerodynamically alleviated marine vehicle =

High speed marine vehicle

An aerodynamically alleviated marine vehicle (AAMV) is a high speed marine vehicle configuration that uses aerodynamically generated forces (lift) to 'alleviate' its weight. The advantage is that the hydrodynamic lift required to sustain the weight of the vehicle is diminished, leading to a diminished hydrodynamic drag. The vehicle is in constant contact with the water, therefore the aerodynamic surfaces operate in ground effect. The name derives from the "Aerodynamic Alleviation Concept", presented by L.J. Doctors to illustrate the positive effect of using a wing-like superstructure on a catamaran configuration.

== Literature review ==
In 1976, Shipps, among other air-supported waterborne vehicles, analysed a new kind of race boats, known as 'tunnel hull' race boats. Two planing sponsons act as aerodynamic end plates of the central 'channel flow' or ram wing. These race boats immediately demonstrated to have better performances with respect to the conventional monohull race boats and a new race boat class was created. The advantages of this new configuration come from the aerodynamic lift. The additional aerodynamic lift can be equal to the 30-80% of the total weight of the marine vehicle. This means a lower hydrodynamic lift needed, therefore a lower chine and keel wetted length and a decreased hydrodynamic drag. Furthermore, the flow in the tunnel hull acts as an air cushion, damping the heave and pitch oscillation: the oscillations of the craft are smoother. Otherwise this aerodynamic lift can create safety and stability problem. Sometimes the craft, for example after a wave, can lose contact with the water. Generally the aerodynamic centre is located upward with respect to the centre of gravity, therefore when the vehicle jumps off the water the pitch moment is unbalanced and the vehicle performs a pitch-over. More generally, Shipps believed in the possible development of air-supported waterborne vehicle, capable of better performances, and suitable for littoral scenarios as well as for offshore scenarios.

In 1978, Ward et al. published an article on the design and performance of a ram wing planing craft: the KUDU II (KUDU I was mentioned in Shipps' article). This vehicle can be considered an AAMV, since it has two planing sponsons separated by a wing section. Therefore, it is a vehicle with aerodynamic and hydrodynamic surfaces, designed to obtain aerodynamic and hydrodynamic lift. In his article Ward presented the results of some trials: the KUDU II was able to run at 78 knots (144 km/h).

In 1978, Kallio, of the David W. Taylor Naval Ship Research and Development Center, performed comparative tests between the KUDU II and the KAAMA. The KAAMA is a conventional mono-hull planing craft. The data obtained during comparative trials show that the KUDU II pitch motion, in sea state 2, at about 40 to 60 knots (110 km/h), is about 30% to 60% lower than the conventional planing hull KAAMA. Unfortunately the KUDU II sustained severe damages during the trials, therefore there are little data available to compare.

In 1996, Privalov and Kirillovikh presented a new vehicle concept called TAP, Transport Amphibious Platform. It can be considered an AAMV. The TAP consists in two hulls, like a catamaran, and a fuselage, a wing and an aerodynamic tail in between the hulls. It moves always in contact with the water and uses an aerodynamic cushion effect, obtained by forcing the powerplant gas jets beneath the platform between the hulls. The authors assess that the advantages of the TAP are:

- the high speed, compared to air cushion vehicles and ships (around 250 km/h),
- amphibious capability,
- high cargo-carrying capacity, also due to his higher weight efficiency, obtained by a more simplified structural scheme as compared to hovercraft and WIGe vehicles.

This vehicle seems to be very promising, however the authors presented only performances estimation of the TAP, without disclosing any detail on the dynamics model adopted.

In 1997, Doctors proposed a new configuration called Ekranocat for which he mentioned the aerodynamic alleviation concept. The weight of the catamaran is alleviated by aerodynamic lift, thanks to a more streamlined superstructure than in traditional catamarans. The theoretical analysis and computed results show that reductions in total drag around 50% can be obtained at very high speed.

== See also ==
- Wing-in-ground effect vehicle
- Surface effect ship
