= Bora-class corvette =

Russian class of guided-missile corvettes

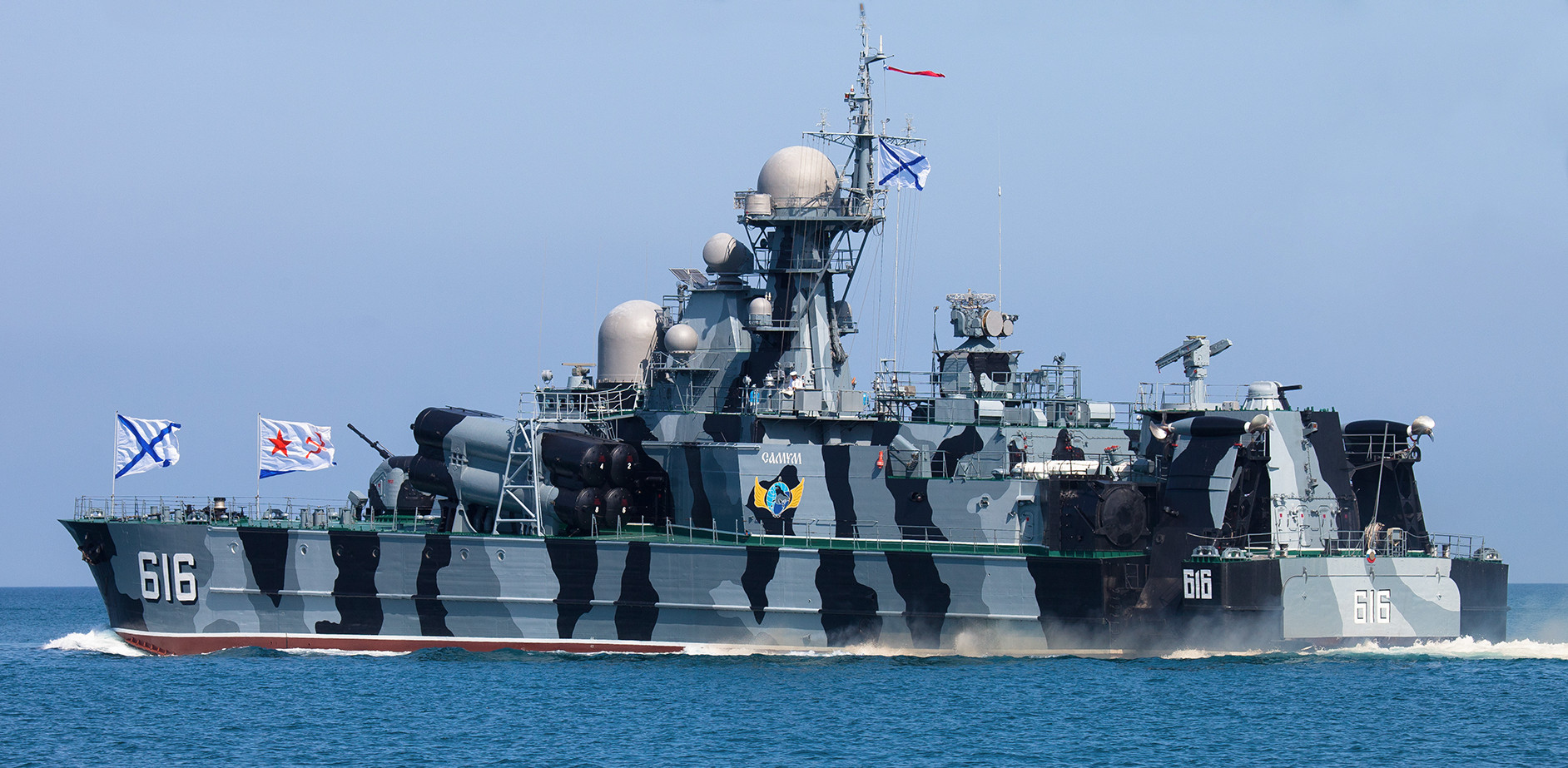
- Samum

Class overview
- Builders: Zelenodolsk Gorky Plant, Kazan; (Chief Designer - L. Elssky)
- Operators: Soviet Navy; Russian Navy
- Built: 1987–2000
- In commission: 1989–present
- Completed: 2
- Active: 2

General characteristics
- Type: Corvette
- Displacement: Around 1,050 tonnes (1,030 long tons)
- Length: 215 ft (66 m)
- Beam: 56 ft (17 m)
- Draught: 10 ft (3.0 m)
- Installed power: 4 × 200 kW diesel-driven generators
- Propulsion: Twin M10-D1 type gas turbine engines rated at 60,000 hp (45,000 kW) bound to two primary three-blade propellers 2 x GTU (36000 hp, roughly 25.8 MW or few more); Twin M511A reduction gear diesel engines rated at 20,000 hp (15,000 kW) bound to two primary three-blade propellers; Twin M52OM3 auxiliary diesel engines driving superchargers rated at 6,800 horsepower (5,100 kW) used to inflate the skirts
- Speed: 12 knots (22 km/h; 14 mph) cruise; 55 knots (102 km/h; 63 mph) maximum
- Range: 2,500 nmi (4,600 km; 2,900 mi) at 12 knots; 800 nmi (1,500 km) at 55 knots
- Endurance: 10 days
- Complement: 35 minimum; 68 combat
- Sensors & processing systems: Monolit-E / Monument-E target detection and designation radar; Pozitiv-ME1 air/surface search radar; 5P-10E Fire Control Radar; Anapa-ME1 sonar; Moskit-E 3Ts-81E missile fire control system; Various cannon and missile guidance and countermeasure systems
- Electronic warfare & decoys: Vympel-R2 suite with Foot Ball-A interceptors; Half Hat-B interceptors; 2 × PK-10 decoy rocket launchers; 2 × PK-16 decoy rocket launchers
- Armament: 8 (2 x 4) P-270 Moskit (SS-N-22 Sunburn) anti-ship missiles; 1 × 9K33M "Osa-MA" type surface-to-air missile system for anti-aircraft defense with 20 missiles; 1 × AK–176M automatic 76.2 mm cannon; 2 × AK-630 30 mm anti-aircraft rotary CIWS; 16 × 9K38 Igla man-portable shoulder mounted surface-to-air missile launcher sets; 2 × 14.5 mm naval machine gun mounts; 1 × DP-64 anti-saboteur grenade launcher
- Notes: Combat ready in rough weather up to Sea State 5

The Bora-class, Soviet designation Project 1239 Sivuch, hoverborne guided-missile corvette of the Russian Navy, also bears the NATO class name "Dergach", is one of the few types of military surface effect ship built solely for marine combat purposes, rather than troop landing or transport. The first vessel produced under this designation was MRK-27, which was later renamed Bora. It is one of the largest combat sea vehicles with catamaran design.

The weapons array Bora-class warships carry varies depending on which of several configurations it is built to. The specifications listed are for the two existing craft.

== Deployment ==
The Bora class was designed in 1988 mainly for coastal defense and patrol duties against surface vessels, large and small. Two were built and are currently in service, both assigned to the Russian Black Sea Fleet. A future series of hovercraft have been planned based on this model for future production.

Samum was reported damaged during the Russo-Ukraine War by a Ukrainian drone strike in September 2023. Nevertheless, both corvettes were reported active as of 2024 relocating to the eastern Black Sea from Crimea where they were evidently considered too vulnerable to a potential attack.

== Ships ==
Name	Hull no.	Laid down	Launched	Commissioned	Fleet	Status
Bora (ex-MRK-27)	615		1987	1989	Black Sea Fleet	Active
Samum (ex-MRK-17)	616	September 1991	1992	2000	Black Sea Fleet	Active; reportedly damaged during drone strike in 2023, but reported active again in 2024.

== See also ==
- List of ships of the Soviet Navy
- List of ships of Russia by project number
