= Serna-class landing craft =

Russian military landing craft

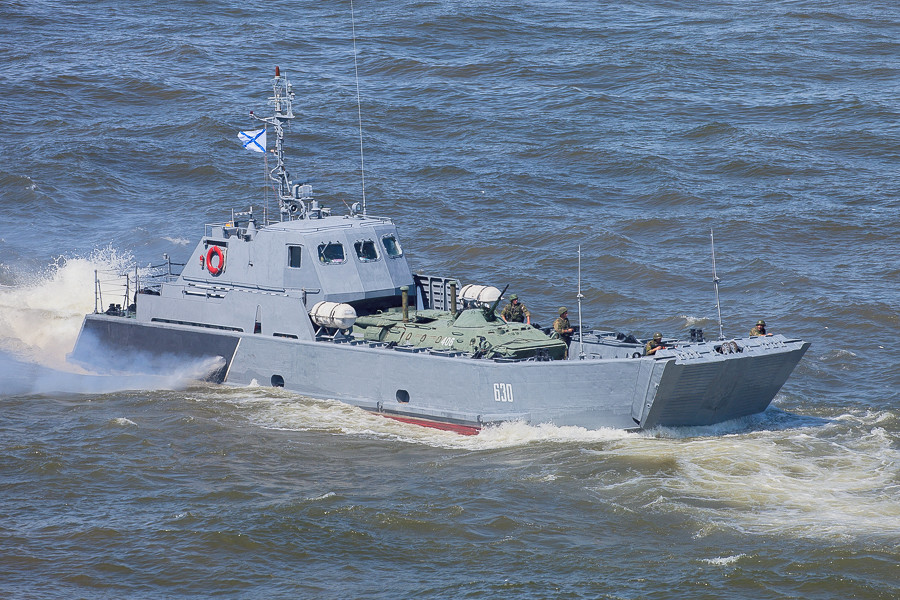
- Project 11770 landing craft D-156

Class overview
- Name: Project 11770 Serna class
- Builders: Vostochnaya Verf
- Operators: Russian Navy; United Arab Emirates Navy
- Built: 1994–2014
- In service: 1994–present
- In commission: 1994–present
- Planned: 17
- Completed: 16
- Active: 13
- Lost: 2
- Retired: 1

General characteristics
- Type: Landing craft
- Displacement: 61 tons (empty)
- Length: 25.65 m (84 ft 2 in)
- Beam: 5.66 m (18 ft 7 in)
- Draft: 1.52 m (5 ft 0 in)
- Propulsion: 2 × 3,300 hp (2,500 kW) M-503A-3 diesels (№807-811 – 2 × 2,000 hp (1,500 kW) MTU16V2000M90 diesels); 2 × 16 kW DG-16/1500 diesel generators
- Speed: 30 knots (56 km/h; 35 mph)
- Range: 600 nmi (1,100 km; 690 mi) at 12 knots (22 km/h; 14 mph); 100 nmi (190 km; 120 mi) at 30 knots (56 km/h; 35 mph)
- Capacity: 1 main battle tank or 2 APCs or 45 tons of cargo
- Troops: 92 troops
- Complement: 5 (2 warrant officers)

The Serna class, Russian designation Project 11770, is a class of air cavity system landing craft constructed for the Russian Navy. Twelve boats were built by Vostochnaya Verf between 1994 and 2014. Four boats of the export project 11771 were built in 1994.

Four ships of the Project 11771 designation were made specifically for export to other countries. One was sold to Estonia (now out of service), and three were sold to the United Arab Emirates.

== Deployment ==
During the 2022 Russian invasion of Ukraine, a Serna-class craft docked at Snake Island was destroyed when the island was attacked by a Ukrainian Bayraktar TB2 drone on 6 May 2022. One more Serna-class craft and one Ondatra-class craft were reported by Ukrainian intelligence to have been destroyed near Crimea on 10 November 2023.
