= Surface effect ship =

Watercraft with air cushion and twin hulls

A surface effect ship (SES) or sidewall hovercraft is a watercraft that has both an air cushion, like a hovercraft, and twin hulls, like a catamaran. When the air cushion is in use, a small portion of the twin hulls remains in the water. When the air cushion is turned off ("off-cushion" or "hull borne"), the full weight of the vessel is supported by the buoyancy of the twin hulls.

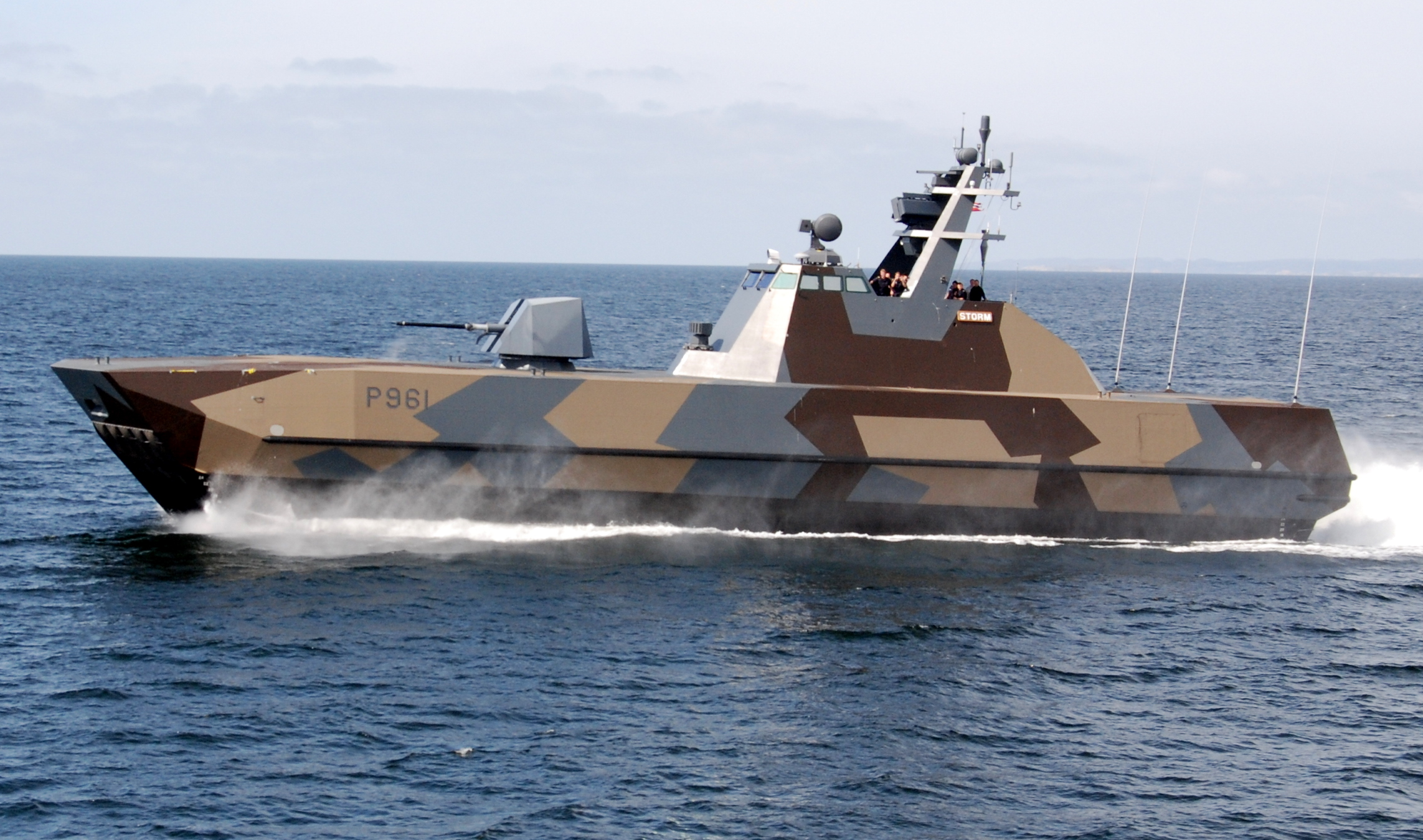
P961 Storm, a Skjold-class corvette of the Norwegian Navy is a modern SES, the fastest combat ship class afloat at the time of their introduction.

The SES has two advantages over a hovercraft for open sea operation: it is more resistant to slipping sideways when acted on by air or sea, and it can use water jets for propulsion since the inlet nozzles are always covered by water.

== History ==
=== United States Navy ===
The United States Navy initiated the SES model test program in 1960. By 1963, a 10-ton test craft called the XR-1 was designed and built to test the surface effect concept. The first version of the XR-1 used fixed plywood seals at the fore and aft ends of the captured air bubble section. A jet engine providing 1,700 pounds-force (7,600 N) of thrust was used for main propulsion. A separate 110 hp (82 kW) gas engine was used to drive lift fans, and also to power out-drive units that were used for off-cushion slow-speed maneuvering. During the first year of testing, the XR-1 was fitted with more powerful main propulsion and flexible fore and aft seals were tested as well.

The XR-1 was also used to test the concept of water-jet propulsion. The ship was modified in 1964 and equipped with gas turbine engines driving the water jet propulsors. The ship's weight increased to 17 tons.

==== Rohr Industries 1970 to 1980 ====
Rohr Industries became involved in SES history in 1970, taking over the XR-1 test program for the Navy. Rohr continued to use the XR-1 to test propulsion and seal concepts. Their eventual goal was to develop a 3000-ton (3,050 tonne) SES, the LSES (Large Surface Effect Ship) or 3KSES, capable of utilizing vertical launch missile systems and anti-submarine helicopters & various VTOL aircraft.

The proposed ship was to have a length of 270 feet and a beam of 105 feet The proposed main power units were to be four LM 2500 gas turbines, each driving an Aerojet water jet propulsor. A cushion height of 18 feet was to be generated with two LM 2500 turbines driving six Aerojet centrifugal fans. It was to carry a crew of 125.

The 3000-ton ship development contract was canceled in 1980.

==== The SES-100 ====
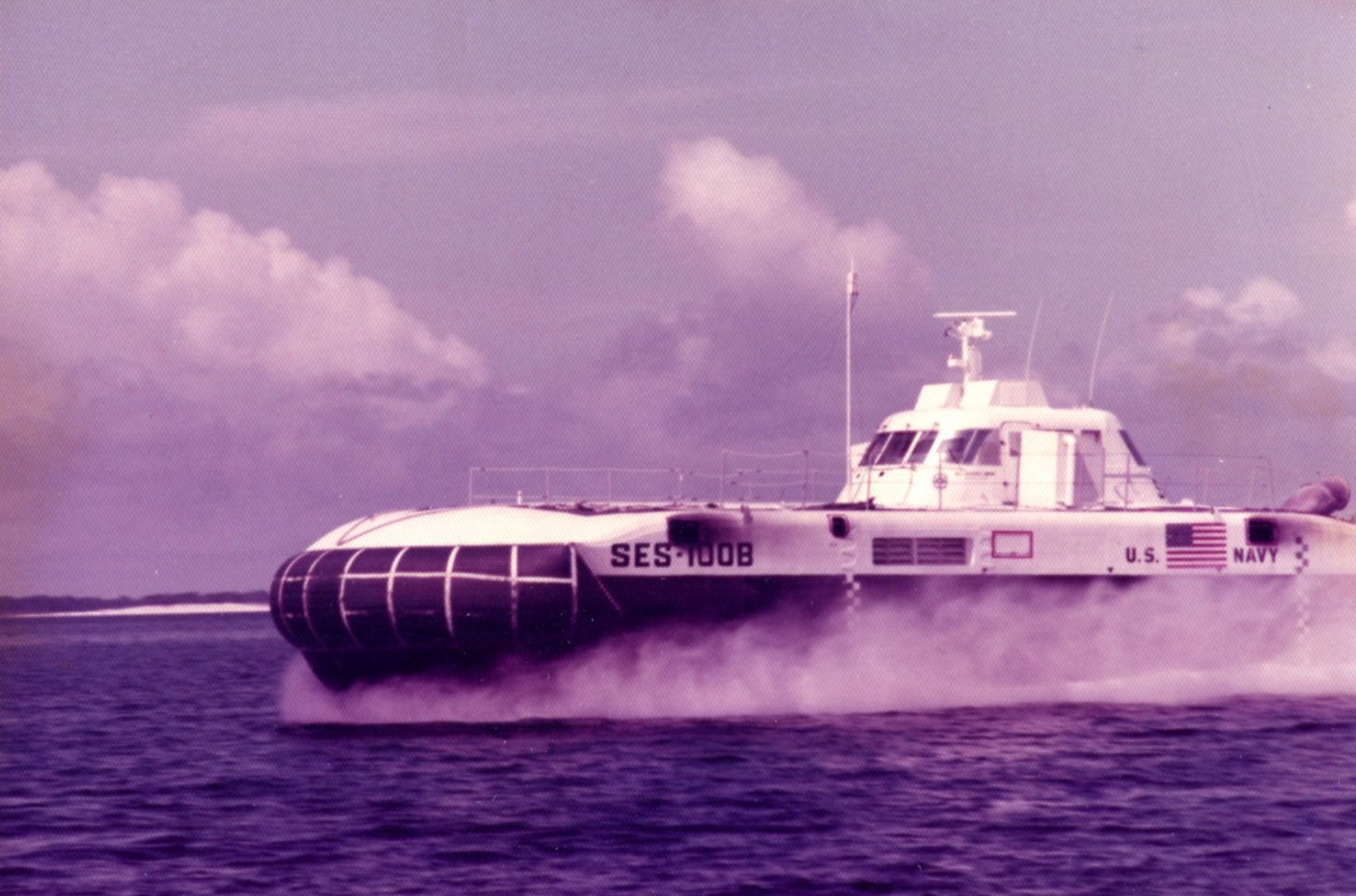
SES-100B during testing on St. Andrews Bay 1975

Two experimental SESs (the SES-100A and 100B), both of around 100 tons, with 80 ft (24 m) length and 40 ft (12 m) beams, were developed for the US Military in the 1960s and 70s. They both attained speeds in excess of the program goal of 80 knots (150 km/h; 92 mph).

The SES 100B, was built by Bell Aerospace (Textron Corporation) at the NASA Michoud Assembly Facility. It had three lift fans powered by 600 horsepower gas turbines, and two 3.5-foot semi-submerged, supercavitating controllable, reversible propellers each powered by a 4,500-horsepower gas turbine. achieved speeds in excess of 96 knots (178 km/h; 110 mph) in the Gulf of Mexico outside St. Andrews Bay in Panama City, Florida.

The speed was verified by the USAF ARIS radar. It also fired the Navy's first vertically launched missile (a modified SM-1) while doing 60 knots (110 km/h; 69 mph). It was also used to test automatic ride control and high speed collision avoidance and navigation systems. The 100A ship was used to test waterjet propulsion, variable geometry inlets and automatic ride control systems. The 100A and 100B were both capable of operating almost completely out of the water on an air cushion with only 18 in (46 cm) of sidewall, the propellers or the waterjet inlets entering the water. The 100-ton SES 100B was built for the US Navy as a 1/10 scale model to test the feasibility of using hovercraft and other Surface Effect Ships in combat situations. The top-secret specifications called for a ship capable of entering a combat zone at a speed of over 80 knots (150 km/h; 92 mph) and disgorging a tank and 100 soldiers onto a beach, turning back out onto water and escaping at high speed.

Unlike the hard sidewall SES's, the full skirted AALCs, JEFF A&B were the prototype vehicles for the LCAC's used by the Navy with such success in the Persian Gulf War.

The 3000-ton SES concept was never designed to go up on the beach, like a landing craft. The AALC (Amphibious Assault Landing Craft) and the SES were very different concepts from the beginning. The AALC was a pure hovercraft that is capable of high-speed insertion of troops and vehicles onto a beach. As a hovercraft, the LCAC, derived from the AALC has no rigid hull parts that extend past the air cushion. It therefore can operate across the beach. The SES has rigid side hulls that enclose the air cushion, permitting water propulsion but allowing it to only go to the shore when conducting amphibious operations. Design concepts for a 6000-plus-ton cargo SES's that Rohr and Ingalls Shipbuilding proposed relied on the idea of the ship loading and unloading from beach, lighter, causeway or conventional dock facilities.

On 10 November 1972 contracts were let to four firms to conduct 2200-ton prototype preliminary design; these designs were to be completed in August 1973. The prime contractors were Bell, Aerojet, Litton, and Lockheed.

==== Aircraft carrier surface effect ship ====
Proposed concepts for an aircraft carrier surface effect ship were considered.

=== Hovermarine SES Ferries ===
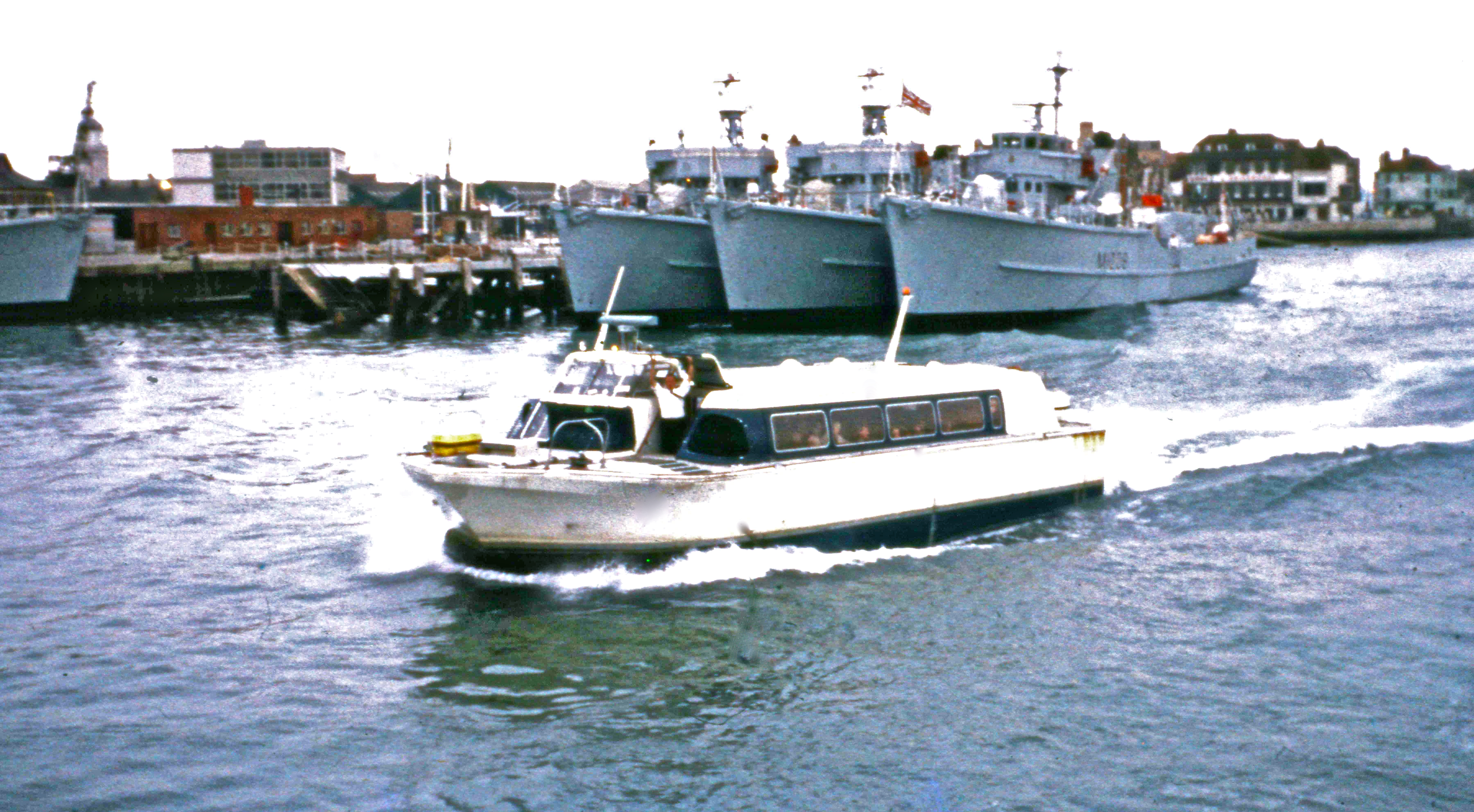
Seaspeed Hovermarine HM2 at Portsmouth in 1969

The UK based company Hovermarine was founded in 1965. They developed the HM-2 SES ferry at their factory in Woolston, Southampton from 1966, along with the larger HM-5, the HM-4 concept and the non-SES Hovercat vessel.

The HM-2 was introduced in 1968 and the first HM-2 was operated by Seaspeed between Ryde Pier and Portsmouth Harbour. This was retrospectively known as a HM216, which was a 16m long HM-2 with a passenger capacity of about 65. The HM-2 was also used as the basis for a hydrographic survey hovercraft, built at the Camper and Nicholsons yard in Southampton as a joint project between Hovermarine and Decca Navigator Company. Launched in January 1969, the first HS-101, as the craft was known, was built for the East Pakistan Authority, and featured a larger bridge and modified superstructure to suit its surveying functions.

The early HM-2s suffered from mechanical problems and during a financial crisis in late 1969, Hovermarine went into voluntary liquidation after its backers; William Cory and Son, C Czarnikow, and bankers Barings refused to further invest in the company after the collapse of takeover talks to broker a deal with the American company, Transportation Technology and Vosper Thornycroft. The major assets of Hovermarine were transferred by the receivers to a new company; Hovermarine Transport Ltd, and this was subsequently taken over by Transportation Technology Inc in December 1969.

After the takeover, production of HM-2s for North and Central America was undertaken by Hovermarine's factory at Titusville, Florida. A brief trial of 2 HM-2 took place in Toronto from July to late Autumn 1974 to Niagara-on-the-Lake to Youngstown, New York. The service managed by Can-Am Hover Express used two craft, Toryoung I and Toryoung II, but an accident with the latter craft led to the demise of the service. In 1976, the HM218 (18 metres long) entered service with configurations offering accommodation for 84, 92 or 103 passengers, and in 1986, the HM221 (21 metres long) was added to the range, with configurations for either 112 to 135 passengers. The first HM221, named Donaupfeil, translated as Danube Arrow was built for an Austrian company operating craft on the River Danube. It was configured for 108 passengers and had a reported contract price of £1.25 million.

In May 1979 Vosper plc announced a deal to take a controlling 75% stake in Hovermarine from parent company, by now renamed as, Hovermarine Corporation. After nine months of negotiations, the deal finally closed in January 1980 structured as a 51% stake with a further 24% on option. Vosper plc was a publicly quoted subsidiary of David Brown separate to Vosper Thornycroft (which had been nationalised in 1977), and the Hovermarine company was renamed Vosper Hovermarine. A HM-5 range was launched with a 27 metre long prototype (HM527) in January 1982, with four, each with a capacity of up to 200 passengers, seeing service in Hong Kong.

In February 1986, Vosper plc, along with Vosper Hovermarine collapsed into receivership after an order for three hovercraft for Indonesia was reduced to two, and a two craft ordered by the National Bus Company was not approved by the government. The company was sold by the receivers in July 1986 to US-backed company and the name changed once again, this time to Hovermarine International. By 1991 the firm had developed two new car ferry designs, one with an 80-seater capacity and one with 180-seater capacity, as well as undertaking production of fire boats, mainly for the American market, including Tacoma and New York.

The company collapsed into receivership again in January 1997, with the assets this time being sold to International Hovercraft Ltd by the administrative receiver.

Between 1965 and 1989, 109 craft had been manufactured in the United Kingdom and United States, by the various Hovermarine companies, with four more on order at that time.

=== Japan ===
In Japan, two type of SES were built: Kibou and Super Liner Ogasawara.

Kibou was operated as a car ferry between Shimizu port and Shimoda port in Shizuoka prefecture. It was 2780-ton, 74m long with 2×MFT8(JT8D) engines. Vessel was decommissioned in 2005. Superliner Ogasawara was planned to operate between Tokyo port and Ogasawara island in Tokyo prefecture, but service was cancelled because of high jet fuel cost in 2005. It stayed in Ishinomaki Port as a hotel ship for victims of the Tunami disaster in 2011. It was later scrapped in 2018. Vessel was 14500-ton, 140m long powered by 2×LM2500 engines

== Operational use ==
=== Russia ===
The Soviet Navy built two 1050-ton Bora-class surface effect corvettes in the late 1980s and early 1990s. The ships were passed on to the Russian Navy and remain in active service with the Black Sea Fleet.

=== Norway ===
Umoe Mandal built 9 Alta and Oksøy class surface effect vessels for mine warfare for the Royal Norwegian Navy.

The Norwegian Navy also operates six Skjold class surface effect patrol boats. These ships are the fastest warships in the world with service speeds of 60 knots (110 km/h). The prototype (KNM Skjold) was leased and tested for one year by the US Navy.

=== Sweden ===
HSwMS Smyge, which acted as a small-scale pre-prototype testbed for the Visby-class corvette is now used as a training platform for Swedish Amphibious Corps Clearance divers.

=== North Korea ===
The Korean People's Army Naval Force operated 6 Nongo-class warship.

== See also ==
- Air cavity system is a related technology.
- Ground-effect vehicle
- Aerodynamically alleviated marine vehicle
- List of amphibious warfare ships
