= Raven (air defence) =

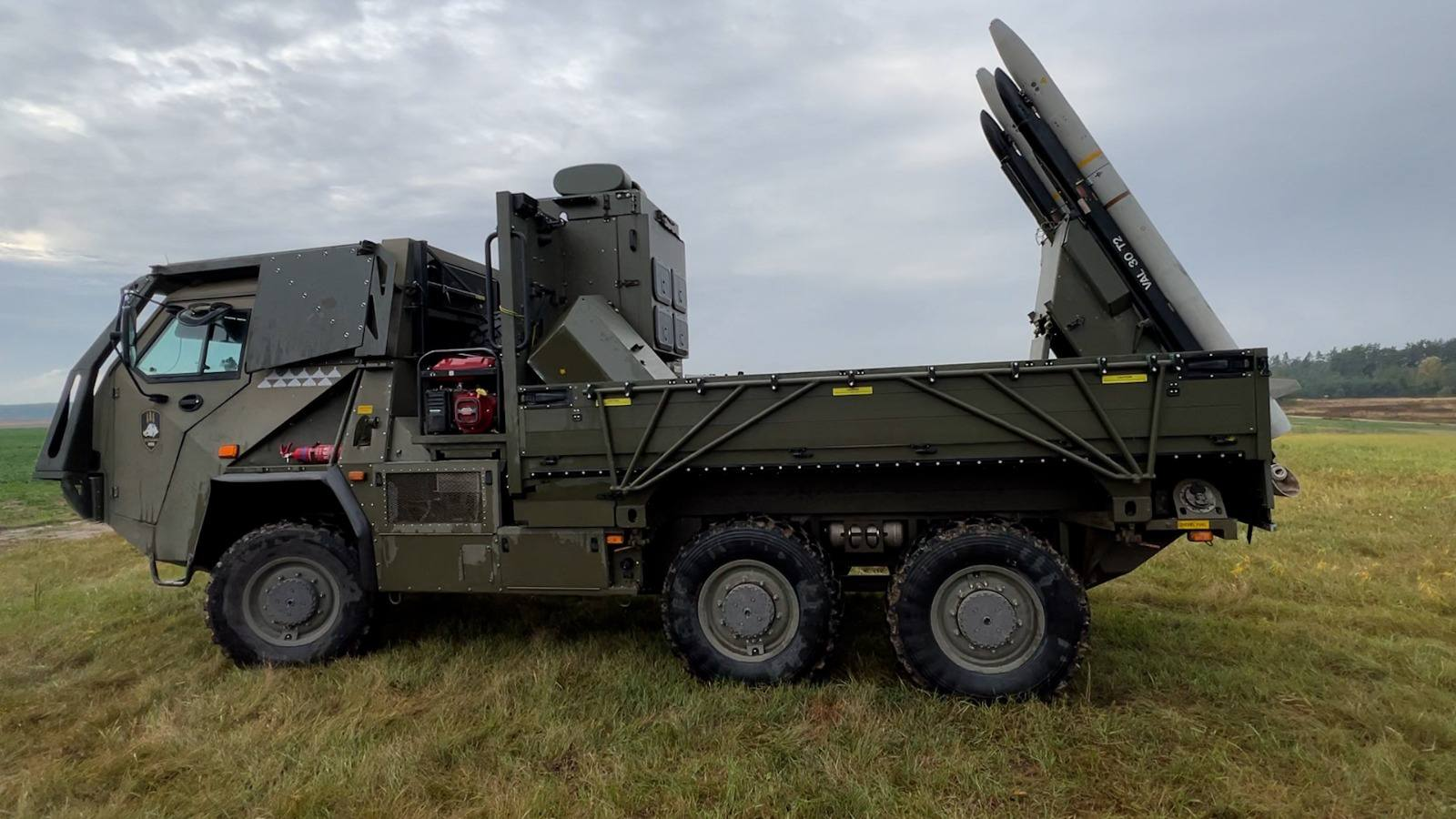
- Raven SAM Launcher
- Type: Self-propelled anti-aircraft weapon
- Place of origin: United Kingdom

Service history
- In service: 2023-
- Used by: Armed Forces of Ukraine
- Wars: Russo-Ukrainian war

Production history
- Designed: 2022
- Manufacturer: Supacat; MBDA
- Developed from: Supacat HMT
- Produced: 2022-
- No. built: 13-18

Specifications
- Main armament: 2xASRAAM Surface-to-Air Missile
- Engine: Cummins 6.7-liter, 6-cylinder diesel 185 hp (138 kW)
- Transmission: Allison 2500 5-speed Automatic
- Fuel capacity: 202L
- Operational range: 500 mi (800 km)
- Maximum speed: 75 mph (120 km/h)

Raven is a short-ranged, self-propelled Surface-to-Air Missile Launcher, initially produced by the United Kingdom for Ukraine using surplus British military equipment. The system was originally developed in just 3 months at the start of the 2022 full-scale Russian Invasion of Ukraine, in response to a Ukrainian request for more NATO-standard Ground Based Air Defences. As of 2025, 13 units have been delivered to the Armed Forces of Ukraine.

== History ==
=== Development ===
Development of Raven began in 2022, with testing completed by the end of that year. The programme went from initial concept to operational deployment in only 3 months, the fastest development of any British Surface-to-Air Missile system.

In April 2026, MBDA and Supacat unveiled an updated system, Raven V. This model uses new in-production versions of the technology used in earlier Raven units, rather than converting them through modification of old military surplus. This provides not only a more capable, flexible system, but one that is suited to long-term, continuous production, unlike the hastily scratch-built original versions which relied on finite stocks of surplus equipment to produce.

=== Operational Service ===
The first 5 systems were delivered in 2023. In June 2025 it was announced that additional deliveries would bring the total to 13 systems. As of April 2026, all 13 had been sent to Ukraine. The Armed Forces of Ukraine stated that they had shot down 'over 400' targets with the system, with a 75% success rate.

== Technology and Systems ==
=== Chassis and Propulsion ===
Raven is based on modified Supacat HMT 600 6x6 Chassis. The most notable modification to the base platform is the inclusion of an enclosed cab. This allows the crew to safely launch from inside the vehicle without being harmed by the hot exhaust of the ASRAAM missile.

The first 13 Raven units have used Supacat HMT 600 Mk2 Military Enhancement Package (MEP) chassis. These were spare units left in storage from the UK's abortive Soothsayer Electronic Warfare programme, which was cancelled in 2009. A total of 32 chassis are thought to be available for conversion to Raven, including those already given to Ukraine.

Raven V units instead use Supacat's HMT 600 Armoured Closed Cab (ACC) chassis. These are new production units based on the latest Supacat HMT Mk3 Extenda, offering greater protection, comfort, mobility and space than the early MEP models.

All models of Raven use versions of the Cummins 6.7L Turbodiesel, mated to a switchable 6x6 drivetrain through an Allison 5-speed automatic transition.

=== Weapons ===
All variants of Raven fire ASRAAM anti-air missiles. Earlier Ravens were equipped with 2 launch rails on a pivoting, non-rotating mount. Raven 5 is equipped with 4 launch rails on a 360° rotating mount developed by Moog Inc. Raven 5 has also been seen fitted with Fulgur MANPADS alongside ASRAAM, but it is unclear whether these have actually been integrated onto the vehicle as of July 2026.

=== Sensors ===
All Variants of Raven used versions of the Hawkeye passive electro-optical (EO) sight developed by Chess Dynamics. This is used to provide the initial cue for the missiles, with terminal guidance conducted by ASRAAM's onboard infrared homing seeker.

=== Variants ===
- Raven 1 - Prototype development unit.
- Raven 2 - First operational surplus converted batch.
- Raven 3 - Second operational surplus converted batch.
- Raven 4
- Raven 5 - Enhanced new-build standard.

== Operators ==
=== Current ===
Ukraine
13 units in active service as of April 2026.

== See also ==
- Gravehawk - another bespoke air defence system developed by the UK for Ukraine.
- CAMM (missile family) - Another British air defence system derived from the ASRAAM missile.
- Jackal (vehicle) - The Family of vehicles the Raven air defence system uses.
