= Russian corvette Ivanovets =

Patrol ship of the Russian Black Sea Fleet

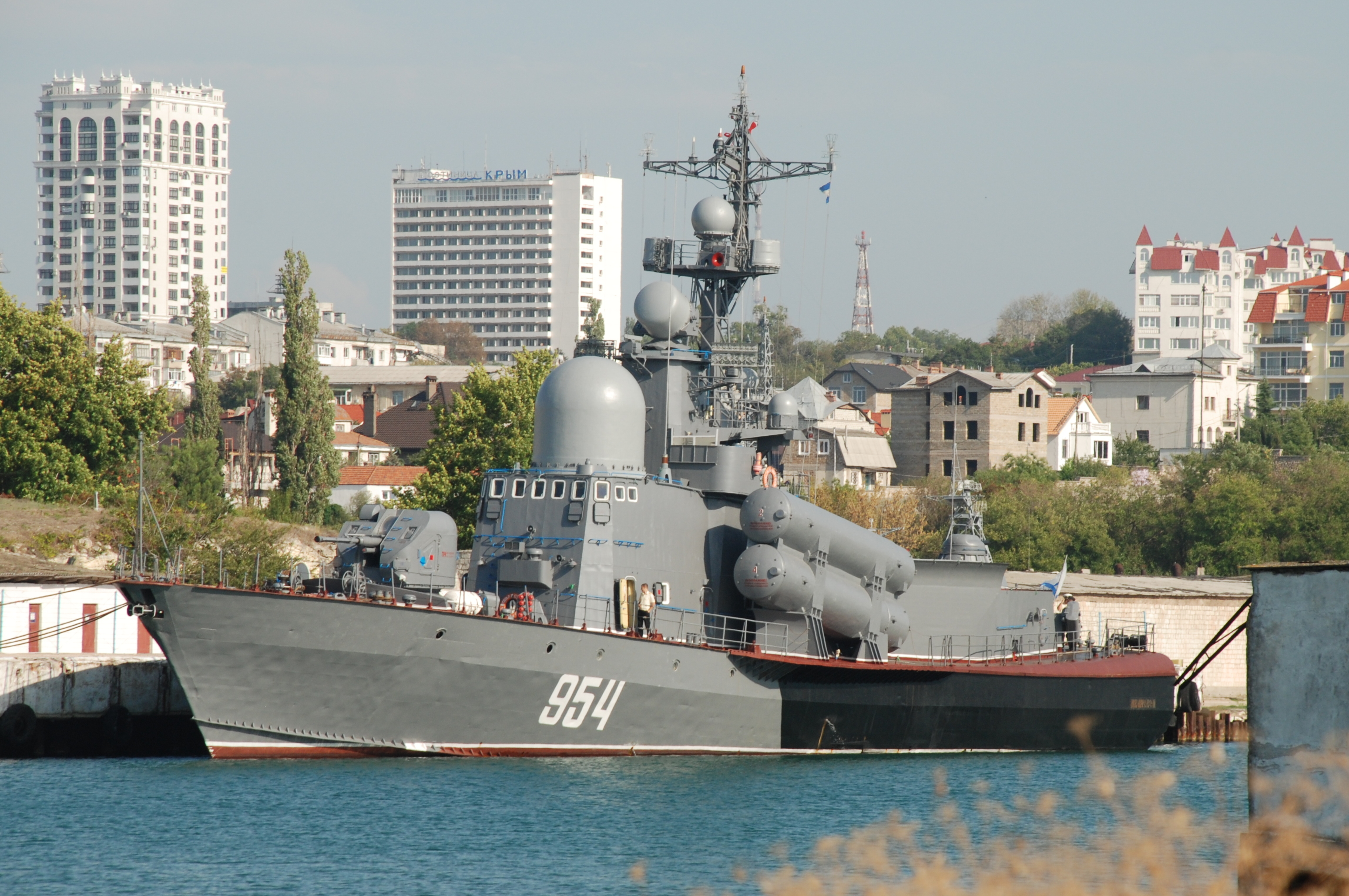
- Ivanovets at Sevastopol in 2012

History

Russia
- Name: Ivanovets
- Namesake: Ivanovo Oblast
- Builder: Sredne-Nevsky Shipyard
- Yard number: 211
- Laid down: 4 January 1988
- Launched: 28 July 1989
- Commissioned: 30 December 1989
- Home port: Sevastopol
- Fate: Sunk on 1 February 2024

General characteristics
- Class & type: Tarantul-class corvette

Ivanovets, formerly R-334, was a Tarantul-class corvette of the Black Sea Fleet of the Russian Navy. She was laid down on 4 January 1988 at Sredne-Nevsky Shipyard and launched a year later on 28 July 1989. The corvette was accepted into the Black Sea fleet on 30 December 1989.

In August 2013, Ivanovets underwent major repairs in drydock. The corvette was intended to join the Russian Navy in the Mediterranean Sea but was chosen to participate in security measures in preparation for the 2014 Winter Olympics at Sochi. She subsequently tracked NATO ships at sea and made a voyage to Syria.

In 2020, the ship carried out patrols near the Ukrainian offshore drilling platforms belonging to the Chornomornaftogaz company.

On 21 July 2023, during training exercises in the northwestern part of the Black Sea, Ivanovets sank the Ukrainian corvette Ternopil with an anti-ship cruise missile. Ternopil, captured by Russia in 2014 during the annexation of Crimea by the Russian Federation, was used as a live-fire practice target.

Ivanovets was attacked by Ukrainian forces using MAGURA maritime drones on 1 February 2024, during the Russian invasion of Ukraine . The vessel sustained severe damage to her hull from the detonations from sea drones. Although Russia claims the crew was evacuated, the Russian defense ministry did not comment on reports of the ship sinking. The attack took place 12 kilometres (7.5 mi) from Donuzlav and 8 kilometres (5.0 mi) from the village of Okunevka on the Black Sea coast. According to the main Intelligence Directorate of Ukraine, the loss of the ship cost Russia between 60 and 70 million dollars.

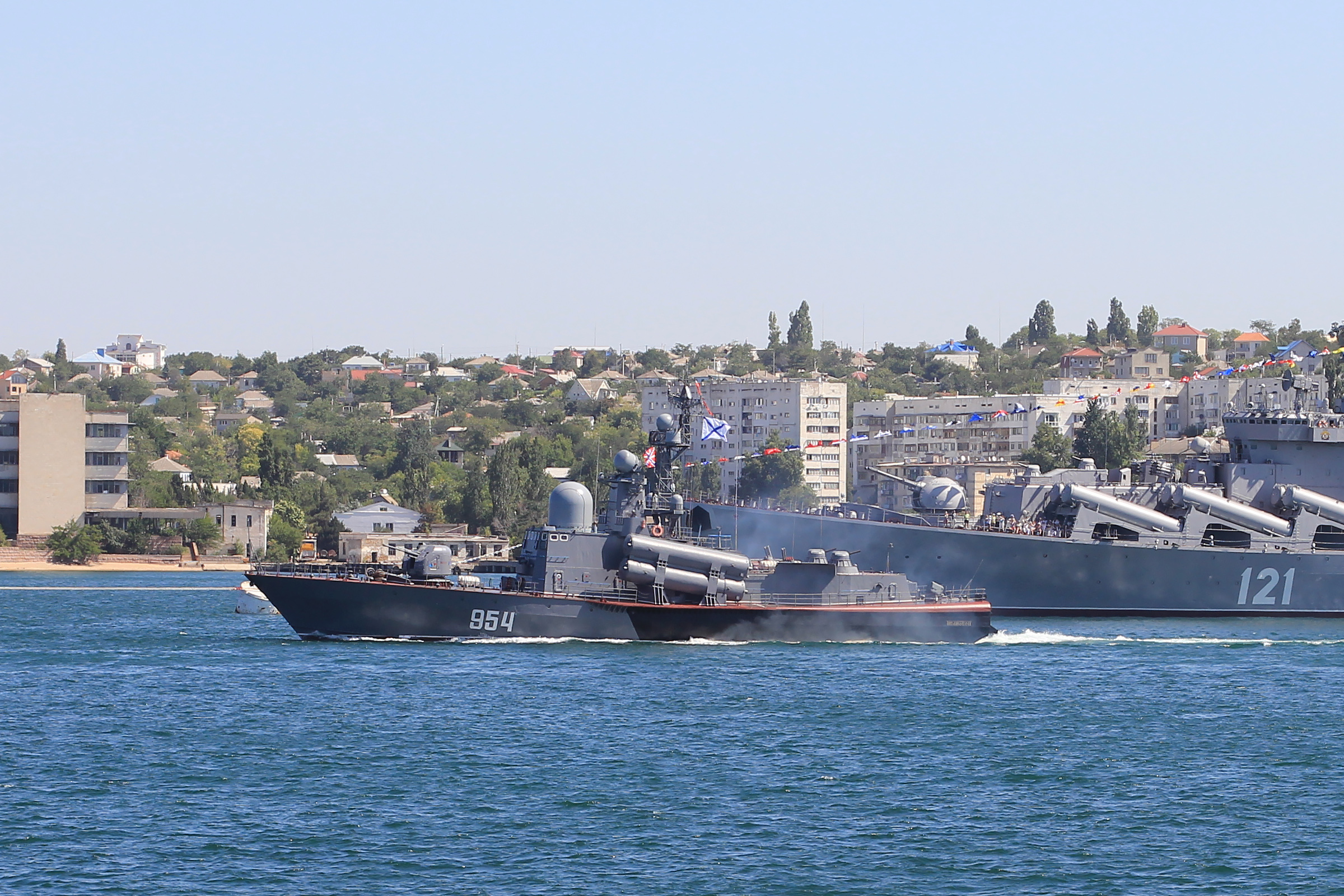
Ivanovets at Sevastopol in 2012

Footage of 1 February 2024 attack on Ivanovets by Group 13
