= Ondatra-class landing craft =

Soviet and Russian landing craft class

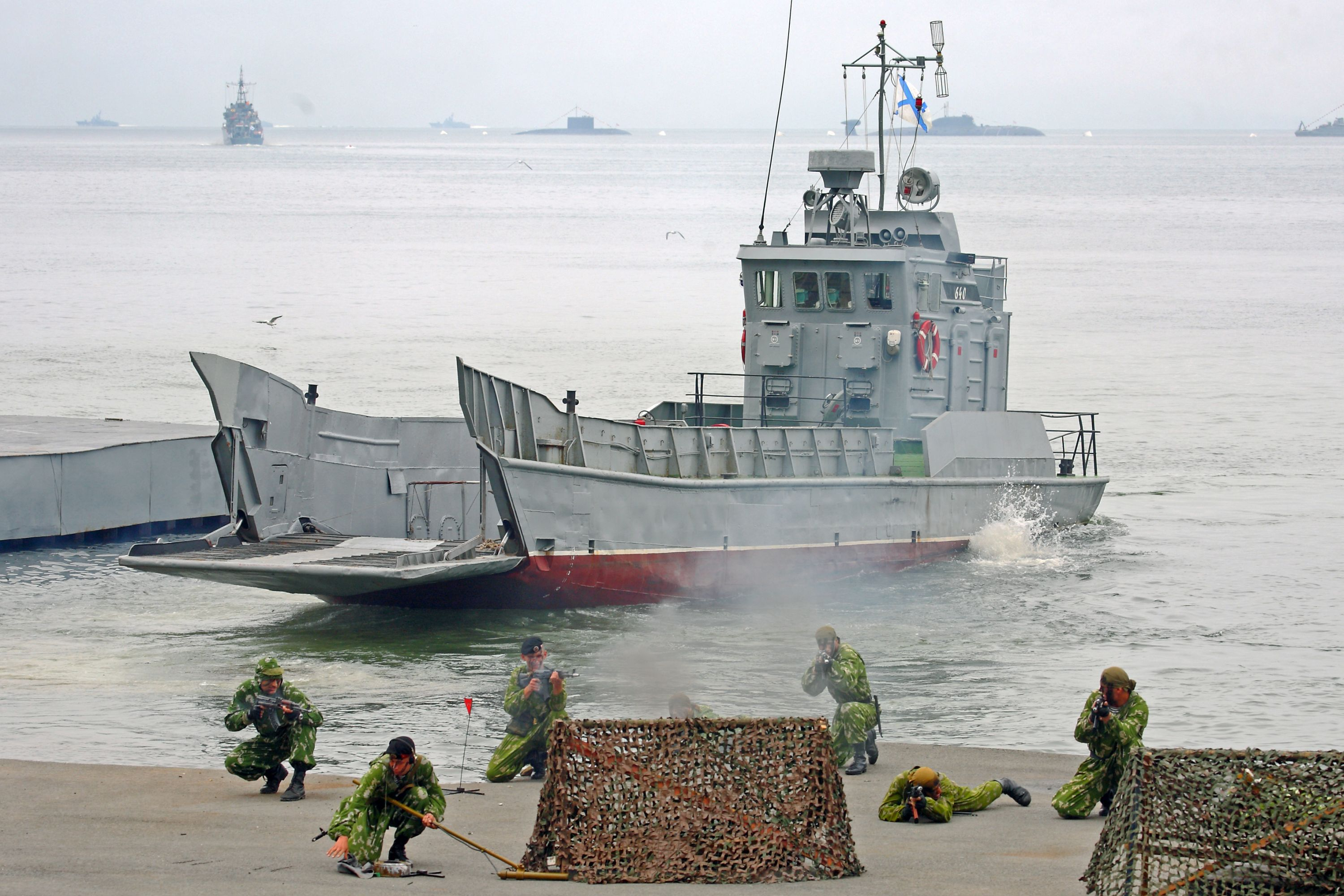
- Ondatra-class landing craft

Class overview
- Name: Project 1176 Akula; (NATO: Ondatra class)
- Builders: Azovskiy; Rybinsk; Vladivostok
- Operators: Soviet Navy; Russian Navy; Ukrainian Navy; Border Police of Georgia
- Built: 1971–2009
- In commission: 1971–present
- Completed: 42
- Lost: 1?

General characteristics
- Type: Landing craft
- Displacement: 107.3 tons full load
- Length: 24.5 m (80 ft 5 in)
- Beam: 5.2 m (17 ft 1 in)
- Draught: 1.55 m (5 ft 1 in)
- Depth of hold: 3.9 m (12 ft 10 in)
- Propulsion: 2 Type 3D12 diesel engines «Барнаултрансмаш» 3Д12 или 3Д12А (Д-448) или 3Д6С2 (Д-163, Д-184, Д-365) или 3Д6С2-081 (Д-57); 600 bhp (450 kW) 2 x 300 л.с. (3Д12А (Д-448) или 2 x 150 л.с. (3Д6С2, 3Д6С2-081); 2 shaft
- Speed: 11.5 knots (21 km/h)
- Range: 330 nmi (610 km; 380 mi) at 10 knots (19 km/h); 500 nmi (930 km; 580 mi) at 5 knots (9 km/h)
- Endurance: 2 days
- Capacity: 1 T-72 tank; or 22 troops; or 50 ton cargo
- Complement: 5
- Sensors & processing systems: 1 Mius (navigation)

The Ondatra class Soviet designation Project 1176 Akula ("shark") is a class of landing craft built for the Soviet Navy and Russian Navy between 1971 and 2009.

== Construction ==
The vessels were built by the Azovskiy Shipyard, Rybinsk Shipyard and Vladivostok Shipyard. Over 40 vessels of this type were built for service with the Soviet and Russian navies, and additional vessels were built for export. The vessels are designated as type DKA Desantanyy Kater and are similar in type to the US Navy Landing Craft Mechanized (LCM).

The Ondatra landing craft have a limited range, of two days and 330–500 nmi, 610–930 km, 380–580 mi) and have a shallow draught that make them ideal for amphibious operations and littoral combat. The Ivan Rogov-class landing ships carry one Ondatra for use as a tug for its Lebed-class air-cushioned landing craft.

Although still under construction in 2009, the Project 1176 is a 1970s design that is reaching the end of its operational life. The class may be replaced by the newer Project 21820 Dyugon-class landing craft that is currently entering service in the Russian Navy. The Dyugon-class vessels carry two main battle tanks compared to the Ondatra's single tank, it is armed (2 MPTU-1 of 14.5 mm), and can attain 35 knots (65 km/h; 40 mph) compared to the Ondatra's 11 knots (20 km/h; 13 mph).

== Ships ==
42 vessels are documented for the Soviet Navy and Russian Navy. On 10 November 2023 one Ondatra-class craft was reported destroyed by Ukrainian intelligence near Chornomors'ke, in northern Crimea by a Ukrainian sea drone.

Name	Builders	Laid down	Launched	Commissioned	Status	Notes
D-335	Azov Shipyard			1 December 1971	Decommissioned in 1990	
D-236	Azov Shipyard			1 December 1974	Decommissioned in 1990	
MDK-01 (ex-D-237)	Azov Shipyard			13 December 1974	Active from 1992 with the Georgian Navy	
D-393	Azov Shipyard			1975	Decommissioned in 1993	
D-392	Azov Shipyard			30 December 1975	Decommissioned in 1996	
D-634	Azov Shipyard			1 June 1976	Decommissioned in 1993	
D-395	Azov Shipyard			1976	Decommissioned in 1995	
D-704	Azov Shipyard			30 July 1976	Active	Pacific Fleet
D-705	Azov Shipyard			1 September 1976	Decommissioned in 1995	
D-706	Azov Shipyard			1 December 1976	Decommissioned in 1995	
D-441	Azov Shipyard			30 April 1976	Decommissioned in 1998	
D-444	Azov Shipyard			22 November 1977	Decommissioned in 2002	
D-705	Azov Shipyard			22 November 1977	Decommissioned in 1995	
D-448	Azov Shipyard			30 November 1977	Decommissioned in 2002	
D-280	Azov Shipyard			30 June 1978	Decommissioned in 1996	
D-282	Azov Shipyard			30 September 1978	Decommissioned in 2001	
D-286	Azov Shipyard			30 November 1978	Decommissioned in 1998	
D-254						Status unknown
D-304				30 December 1978	Decommissioned in 1998	
D-289	Azov Shipyard			1979	Decommissioned in 1994	
Svatovo (ex-D-305)	Azov Shipyard			12 January 1979	Active from 1998 with the Ukrainian Navy; possibly captured by Russia, March 2022	
D-306	Azov Shipyard			10 November 1980	Decommissioned in 1993	
D-70	Azov Shipyard			30 July 1981	Active as of 2025	Pacific Fleet
Azov	Azov Shipyard			20 May 1981	Active as of 2025	Civil ship?
D-464	Azov Shipyard			30 August 1985	Active as of 2025	Northern Fleet
D-465	Azov Shipyard	28 April 1986	20 September 1986	30 December 1986	Active as of 2025	Baltic Fleet
D-288				1990		Status unknown
MDK-02 (ex-D-293)				1990	Active from 1992 with the Georgian Navy	
D-263	Azov Shipyard			30 November 1987	Decommissioned in 2008	
D-295	Azov Shipyard			30 December 1989	In reserve?	Black Sea Fleet
D-460	Azov Shipyard			30 June 1989	Decommissioned in 2005	
D-325	Azov Shipyard	15 March 1990	30 August 1990	30 December 1991	Active as of 2025	Baltic Fleet
D-148	Azov Shipyard			30 December 1993	Active as of 2025	Northern Fleet
D-365	Azov Shipyard			1994	Active as of 2025	Baltic Fleet
PSKA-771	Vympel Shipyard			1995	Decommissioned 2016	
PSKA-772	Vympel Shipyard			1995		Renamed PKAO-772, Baltic Fleet?
D-182	Azov Shipyard			15 August 1996	Active as of 2025	Northern Fleet
D-185	Azov Shipyard			30 December 2000	Active as of 2025	Caspian Flotilla
Nikolai Rubtsov (ex-D-163)	Sokolskaya Shipyard			7 December 2005	Active as of 2025	Northern Fleet
D-57	Vostochnaya Verf			23 November 2007	Active as of 2025	Pacific Fleet
D-184	Sokolskaya Shipyard			2008	Active as of 2025	Black Sea Fleet?
D-106	Sokolskaya Shipyard			23 November 2009	Reportedly blew up on a mine near Mariupol (Ukraine) in mid-2022	Former Black Sea Fleet

== See also ==
- List of ships of Russia by project number
