= The Hague Centre for Strategic Studies =

Dutch think tank

The Hague Centre for Strategic Studies (HCSS, Dutch: Den Haag Centrum voor Strategische Studies) is a think tank focused on strategic decision making and policy advice on national and international security issues. Established in 2003, the institute is based on Lange Voorhout in The Hague.

The HCSS undertakes strategic research and analysis on topics such as international peace and security, geopolitical developments and trends, conflict management, defence policy and terrorism. The HCSS undertakes commissions both for the public and private sectors. Partners of HCSS are political, economic and military decision makers in Netherlands, Europe as well as international organisations such as NATO, the EU and academic organisations over the entire world. The HCSS also participates in consortia such as the Water Peace and Security partnership, and the International Military Council on Climate and Security (IMCCS).

Analysts and experts from HCSS regularly contribute to national and international media to provide commentary of geopolitical developments and international security issues.

In 2023, the HCSS was heavily criticised by the Volkskrant newspaper for a lack of transparency in stating its financial sources. The accompanying implication was that those commissioning reports were influencing their content, and thereby negating the independent status of HCSS.

== History ==
HCSS was founded as part of the non-governmental organisation TNO in 2003; it was part of the department Strategy and Policy Studies (Strategie en Beleidsstudies) of the Business Unit of TNO Defence and Security. In 2003 TNO and the Clingendael Institute agreed to cooperate on a new unit with the name Clingendael Centrum voor Strategische Studies. Professor Rob de Wijk, then professor of international relations at the Leiden University, started the think-tank. He included a small team of senior experts and analysts from organisations such as TNO, RAND, Clingendael, the Dutch Ministry of Defence and the United Nations.

Since March 2007, HCSS has been an independent strategic think tank. TNO was a 100% shareholder of TNO Bedrijven, which is a 100% shareholder of TNO Deelnemingen, which in turn held 80% of the shares in HCSS. On 30 March 2017, TNO sold 55% of its interest in TNO Bedrijven to First Dutch Innovations in Delft.

Since December 2019 the HCSS management team has been the 100% shareholder of HCSS.
