= Dyugon-class landing craft =

Watercraft in the Russian Navy

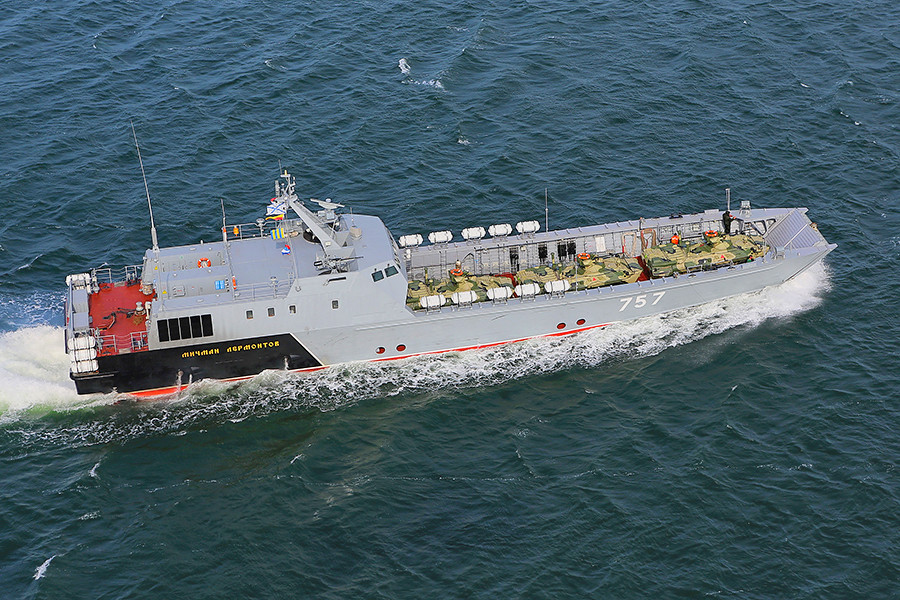
- Michman Lermontov underway in September 2015.

Class overview
- Name: Dyugon class
- Builders: OJSC Vostochnaya Verf in Vladivostok (1) OJSC Shipbuilding Plant Volga in Nizhny Novgorod (1) OJSC Yaroslavl Shipyard in Yaroslavl (3)
- Operators: Russian Navy
- In commission: 2010–present
- Building: 6
- Completed: 5
- Active: 5

General characteristics
- Type: Landing craft
- Displacement: 280 tonnes
- Length: 45 m (148 ft)
- Beam: 8.6 m (28 ft)
- Height: 5.1 m (17 ft)
- Draft: 1.9 m (6 ft 3 in)
- Propulsion: 2 × 9,000 hp (6,700 kW) M507A-2D diesel engines
- Speed: 35 knots (65 km/h; 40 mph)
- Range: 500 nautical miles (926 km)
- Capacity: 120-140 tonnes of cargo, 3 battle tanks or 5 BTR personnel carriers and up to 100 marines
- Crew: 7
- Armament: 2 KPV 14.5 mm machine guns

The Dyugon-class landing craft, Russian designation Project 21820, is a class of five air-cavity landing craft in service with the Russian Navy.

== Ships ==
Name	Hull No.	Laid down	Launched	Commissioned	Fleet	Status	Notes
Ataman Platov		21 February 2006	17 July 2009	2010	Caspian Fleet	Active	
Denis Davydov	701	18 January 2012	26 July 2013	24 November 2014	Baltic Fleet	Active	
Ivan Kartsov		2010	30 September 2013	11 June 2015	Pacific Fleet	Active	
Lieutenant Rimskij-Korsakov	714	21 June 2012	10 April 2014	4 July 2015	Baltic Fleet	Active	
Midshipman Lermontov	757	18 January 2013	5 June 2014	4 July 2015	Baltic Fleet	Active	

== Controversies ==
According to Russian newspaper Izvestija, the central command of the Russian Navy sent a report to the Russian Defence minister after the sea trials of the first Dyugon-class landing craft in the Caspian Sea, complaining about serious design errors and poor workmanship in the craft, stating cracks developed in the hull while travelling at speed, potentially breaking the vessel apart. Izvestija also claimed the orders for the five vessels were split between multiple shipyards for socio-economic reasons... to keep them busy, instead of ordering them from a shipyard with experience in building air-cavity vessels.

The High Command of the Navy prepared a report addressed to Defense Minister Sergei Shoigu with a request to close the project of the newest airborne landing craft 21820 "Dugong". Navy sailors believe that there were serious design errors in the project. A source in the Navy told Izvestia that the position of the High Command is based on reports from the headquarters of the Caspian Military Flotilla, where one ship is based.

— We have Ataman Platov in the Caspian Sea, and Ivan Kartsov will be launched in the Pacific Ocean. Three more are at shipyards in varying degrees of readiness. As a result of operation, cracks have formed in the stern of the combat boat; the seams of the hull cannot withstand movement at high speed and are coming apart,” an officer from the Commander-in-Chief shared with Izvestia.

According to the sailors, the problems arose due to incorrect design and assembly at the shipyard. The operational load on the housing exceeds the values set in the strength characteristics. In other words, the designers and shipbuilders calculated one resistance indicator, but in reality they came out with another, higher one. Because of this, at high speeds the ship “catches a wave” and is subjected to a strong hydrodynamic shock, which can even break it in half.

An air cavity is a dynamic type of air cushion, where a layer of compressed air under the bottom of a ship arises due to the movement of the ship. This differs from a static air cushion, where a layer of air is pumped by fans. Thanks to the bubble, friction and hydrodynamic resistance are significantly reduced, and the speed increases to 30–50 knots.

The displacement of the Dugong is 280 tons, which is quite a lot for similar ships. In addition to it, the domestic fleet has eight boats of the 11770 Serna series. They are much smaller - displacing about 100 tons - and have earned praise from sailors. One of the Baltic Fleet officers who served on the Serna notes its reliability, speed and seaworthiness.

— There are no problems with the boat, except for one small one. It carries one tank or two infantry fighting vehicles, but we would like something more substantial. It's a pity that the Caspians didn't like the Dugong,” he told Izvestia.

Both projects were developed by the Nizhny Novgorod Central Design Bureau for Hydrofoils named after Alekseev. In fact, the Dugong is an enlarged Chamois, capable of lifting three tanks or five armored vehicles. Why design mistakes were made in a large boat, sailors are at a loss.

A representative of the military-industrial complex who participated in the projects clarified the situation to Izvestia on condition of anonymity. According to him, problems arose at the production stage. Laid down in 2006, the Ataman Platov was transferred to the fleet only in 2010, although in four years it is possible to build not only a 280-ton boat, but also a cruiser with a displacement of 25 thousand tons. This is how much the domestic flagship “Peter” was built in Soviet times Great,” the source emphasizes.

Administrative and economic confusion is to blame, he says. Platova built the Volga plant in Nizhny Novgorod. The Ivan Kartsov was laid down at the Eastern Shipyard in Vladivostok, although it should have been at the Volga. And the next three boats of the project were laid down at the Yaroslavl Shipyard.

— “Dugongs” must be built at the same production facilities, and jumping across the whole country ruins the project. The Volga is best suited for construction, where it has accumulated extensive experience in hovercraft. And the decision to move production was made for socio-political reasons,” said a representative of the military-industrial complex.

By the time the Ivan Kartsov was laid down in 2010, serious problems with orders had arisen at the Eastern Shipyard, and this is one of the city-forming enterprises of Vladivostok. The country's leadership could not allow social tension in the city, which was preparing for the APEC 2012 summit, so the construction of the boat was moved here. Approximately the same motives were behind the transfer of production to Yaroslavl, which is less prosperous than Nizhny Novgorod.

— The problems of Ataman Platov are well known to the designers. But sailors could take into account that this is the first ship of the project, it has “childhood diseases” that are treated after additional tests. Why immediately cut from the shoulder? After all, the Navy needs Dugongs,” says Izvestia’s interlocutor.

Vice-President of the Academy of Geopolitical Problems Konstantin Sivkov agrees with the shipbuilders.

— Ships in an air cavity moving at a speed of 50 knots (90 km/h) are very difficult to hit before landing. If they are abandoned, then carrying out landing missions will require more massive fire suppression of the defense, and your losses will increase. So we must not abandon the Dugongs, but ensure that they are improved,” the expert told Izvestia.

The first ships with a dynamic support principle were built on static air cushions with powerful fans and enormous fuel consumption. Air-cavity vessels are more economical. In both types, the bottom has special contours to hold a layer of compressed air.

== See also ==
- List of ships of the Soviet Navy
- List of ships of Russia by project number
