= Russian corvette Samum =

Bora-class corvette of the Soviet Navy

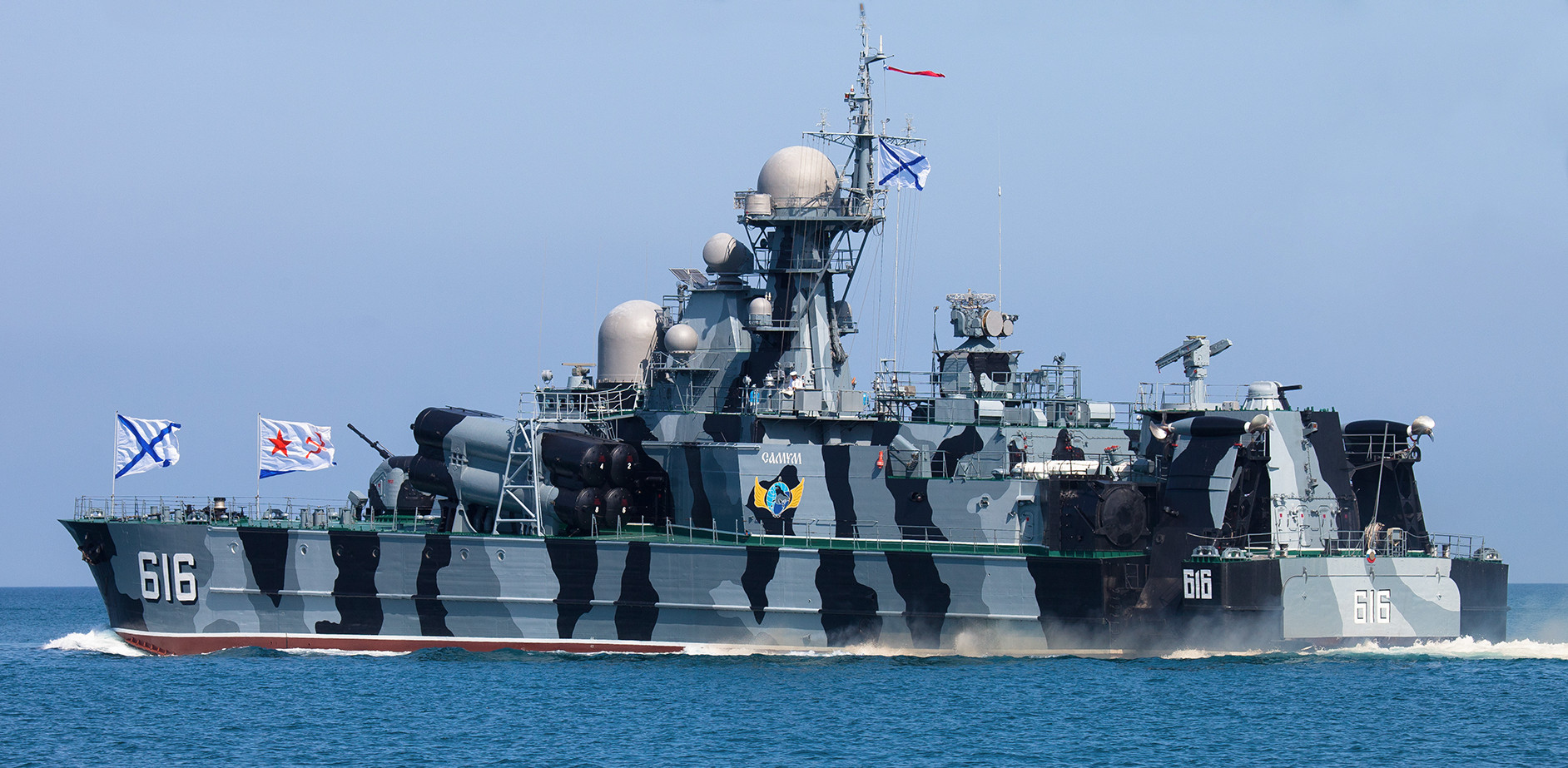
- Samum in 2010

History

Russia
- Name: MRK-17
- Builder: A.M. Gorky Shipyard, Zelenodolsk
- Yard number: 502
- Laid down: September 1991
- Launched: 12 October 1992
- Commissioned: 26 February 2000
- Renamed: Samum; (Самум)
- Namesake: Samum
- Identification: See Pennant numbers
- Status: Active

General characteristics
- Class & type: Bora-class corvette
- Displacement: 1,050 tonnes (1,033 long tons)
- Length: 66 m (216 ft 6 in)
- Beam: 17 m (55 ft 9 in)
- Draught: 3 m (9 ft 10 in)
- Installed power: 4 × 200 kW diesel-driven generators
- Propulsion: Twin M10-D1 type gas turbine engines rated at 60,000 hp (45,000 kW) bound to two primary three-blade propellers 2 x GTU (36000 hp, roughly 25.8 MW or few more); Twin M511A reduction gear diesel engines rated at 20,000 hp (15,000 kW) bound to two primary three-blade propellers; Twin M52OM3 auxiliary diesel engines driving superchargers rated at 6,800 horsepower (5,100 kW) used to inflate the skirts
- Speed: 12 knots (22 km/h; 14 mph) cruise; 55 knots (102 km/h; 63 mph) maximum
- Range: 2,500 nmi (4,600 km) at 12 knots; 800 nmi (1,500 km) at 55 knots (102 km/h)
- Endurance: 10 days
- Complement: 35 minimum; 68 combat
- Sensors & processing systems: Monolit-E / Monument-E target detection and designation radar; Pozitiv-ME1 air/surface search radar; 5P-10E Fire Control Radar; Anapa-ME1 sonar; Moskit-E 3Ts-81E missile fire control system; Various cannon and missile guidance and countermeasure systems
- Electronic warfare & decoys: Vympel-R2 suite with Foot Ball-A interceptors; Half Hat-B interceptors; 2 × PK-10 decoy rocket launchers; 2 × PK-16 decoy rocket launchers
- Armament: 2 × Quadruple MT-206ME launchers for 3M-80E "Moskit" marine cruise missiles; 1 × 9K33M "Osa-MA" type surface-to-air missile system for anti-aircraft defense with 20 missiles; 1 × AK–176M automatic 76.2 mm cannon; 2 × AK-630 30 mm anti-aircraft Gatling cannons; 16 × 9K38 Igla man-portable shoulder mounted surface-to-air missile launcher sets; 2 × 14.5 mm naval machine gun mounts; 1 × DP-64 anti-saboteur grenade launcher
- Notes: Combat ready in rough weather up to Sea State 5

Samum (former MRK-17) is a Bora-class corvette in the Soviet Navy and later the Russian Navy. In Soviet and later Russian classification, it is considered a "small missile ship" (Russian: малый ракетный корабль, МРК). Like the rest of the class, it is a surface effect ship armed with anti-ship missiles.

== Construction and career ==
MRK-17 was laid down in September 1991 and launched on 12 October 1992 at the A.M. Gorky Shipyard, Zelenodolsk and commissioned into the Baltic Fleet on 26 February 2000.

On 19 March 1992, the vessel was renamed Samum, after the Russian word for the simoom desert wind.

On 25 July 2002, Samum was assigned to the Black Sea Fleet.

On 14 September 2023, while stationed in Sevastopol during the Russian invasion of Ukraine, the ship was the target of a Sea Baby sea drone attack by Ukraine. According to Ukrainian intelligence sources, afterwards the ship was towed away for "extensive damage" on one side. The Russian defense ministry claimed however that the attack was repelled. As of mid-2024, the corvette was reported active, relocating to the eastern Black Sea from Crimea where evidently it had been considered too open to attack.

=== Pennant numbers ===
Date	Pennant number
1989	609
1990	616
