= Air cavity system =

Air cavity system (or ACS) is a modern marine hull design concept based upon capturing air beneath a vessel's hull to reduce drag and increase speed and fuel efficiency.

== How it works ==
The system works by trapping a layer of air bubbles beneath the ship's hull. A dedicated system or an air blower generates air bubbles that pass nonstop under the ship's surface. Along the bottom of the hull, air bubble outlets are located at different sites equally on both the sides of the boat's center. A layer of bubbles is formed by blowing air at a constant rate, reducing the drag and resistance between the boat and the water.

== Operational use ==
ACS is used on the Russian Serna- and Dyugon-class landing crafts.

== See also ==
- Froude number
- Hull (watercraft)
- Ship resistance and propulsion
