= R-73 (missile) =

Air-to-air missile

R-73 / R-74 AA-11 Archer
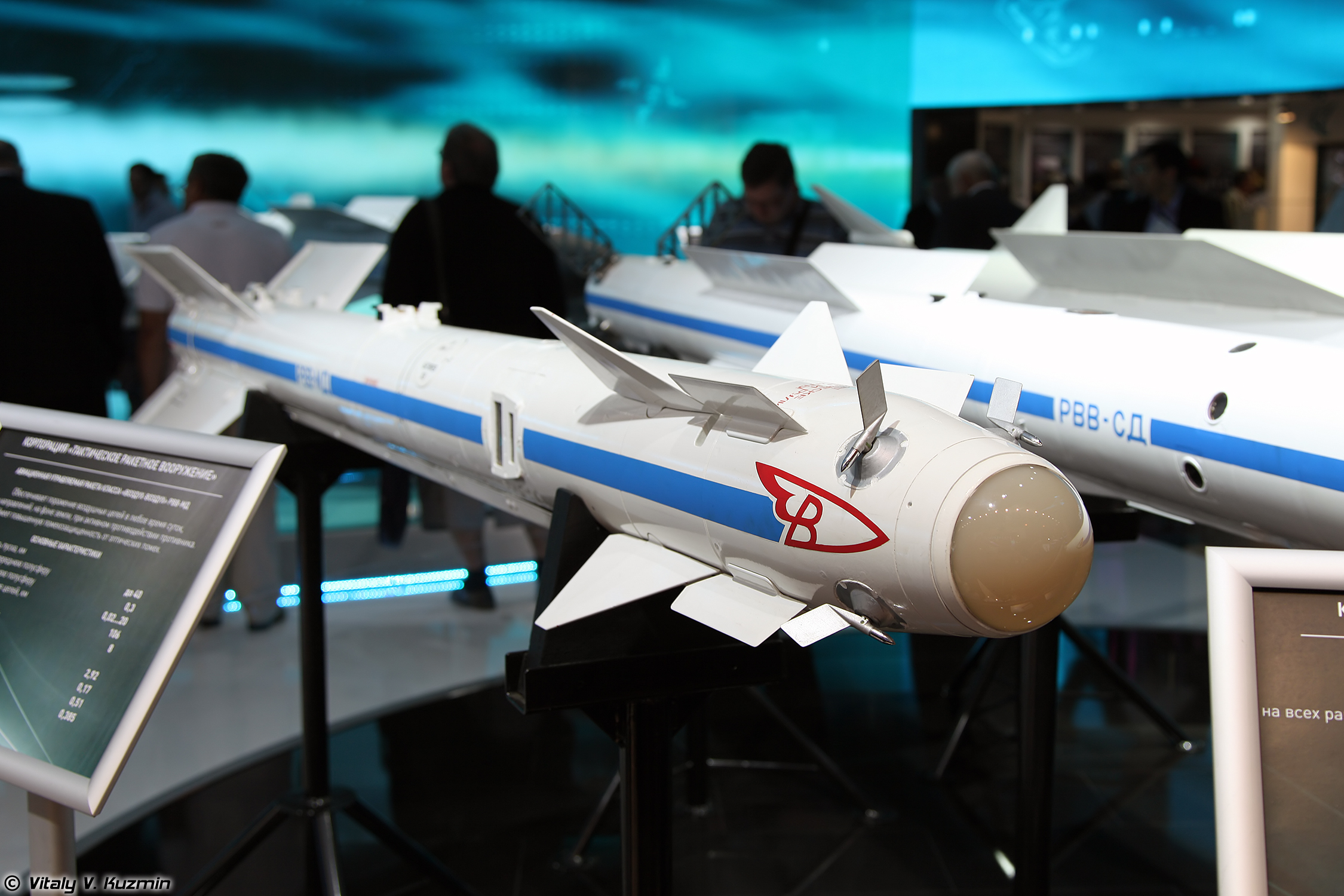
- A mock up of RVV-MD - the export variant of the R-74M
- Type: Short-range air-to-air missile
- Place of origin: Soviet Union

Service history
- In service: 1984–present
- Used by: See Operators
- Wars: Eritrean-Ethiopian War; Yemeni civil war (2014-present); Russo-Ukrainian War

Production history
- Manufacturer: Moscow Kommunar Machine-Building Plant, Tbilisi Aircraft Manufacturing, TAM Management

Specifications
- Mass: 105 kilograms (231 lb)
- Length: 2.93 metres (9 ft 7 in)
- Diameter: 165 millimetres (6.5 in)
- Wingspan: 510 millimetres (20 in)
- Warhead: 7.4 kilograms (16 lb)
- Engine: Solid-fuel rocket engine
- Operational range: R-73A, R-73E: 30 kilometres (19 mi); R-74, RVV-MD: 40 kilometres (25 mi)
- Maximum speed: Mach 2.5
- Guidance system: All-aspect infrared homing
- Launch platform: MiG-21(Upgraded), MiG-23-98, MiG-25, MiG-27, MiG-29, MiG-31, MiG-35; Sukhoi Su-24, Su-25, Su-27, Su-30, Su-33, Su-34, Su-35, Sukhoi Su-57, Sukhoi Su-47; Yak-141, Yak-130; HAL Tejas; IRIAF F-14; J-10; J-11; Mirage 2000 (Indian Air Force); MAGURA V5 USV (HUR Ukraine); 9K33 Osa; Gravehawk

The Vympel R-73 (NATO reporting name AA-11 Archer) is a short-range IR-homing air-to-air missile developed by Vympel NPO that entered service in 1984. It was later developed into the more advanced R-74.

== Development ==
The R-73 was developed to replace the earlier R-60 (AA-8 'Aphid') short-range missile used by Soviet fighter aircraft. Work began in 1973 initially as the K-73, (Note: Soviet and Russian missile under development are given the K prefix, which becomes the R prefix when the weapon becomes operational.) operational in 1982 and the first missiles formally entered service in 1984.

The R-73 is an infrared homing (heat-seeking) missile with a sensitive, cryogenic cooled seeker with a substantial "off-boresight" capability: the seeker can detect targets up to 40° off the missile's centerline. It can be targeted by a helmet-mounted sight (HMS) allowing pilots to designate targets by looking at them. Minimum engagement range is about 300 meters, with maximum aerodynamic range of nearly 31 km (19 mi) at altitude. The weapon is used by the MiG-29, MiG-31, Su-27/33, Su-34 and Su-35, and can be carried by newer versions of the MiG-21, MiG-23, Sukhoi Su-24, and Su-25 aircraft.

Shortly after German reunification in 1990, Germany and other ex-Warsaw Pact countries found themselves with large stockpiles of the R-73 missiles or AA-11 Archers as designated by NATO, and had concluded that the R-73/AA-11's capabilities had been noticeably underestimated by the West. In particular, the R-73 was found to be both far more maneuverable, and far more capable in terms of seeker acquisition and tracking than the latest AIM-9 Sidewinder. This realization started the development of newer missiles to remain competitive against systems such as the ASRAAM, IRIS-T and AIM-9X.

According to an interview in 2022 with a Ukrainian pilot, the R-73 does not track targets well in clouds. This makes the missile difficult to use against Shahed-136 drones, forcing pilots to rely on their 30 mm cannon.

Further developments include the R-74 (izdeliye 740) and its export variant RVV-MD. These are expected to supplement previous variants of the R-73 in service.

An improved version of the R-74, the R-74M (izdeliye 750) features fully digital and re-programmable systems, and is intended for use on the MiG-35, MiG-29K/M/M2, Su-27SM, Su-30MK and Su-35S. A further upgrade, known as the R-74M2 (izdeliye 760), is intended for the fifth-generation Su-57 aircraft. This missile has an inertial navigation system, a smaller cross-section with the fin span reduced to 434 mm (17.1 in) to fit in internal weapon bays, has IRCCM (infrared counter-countermeasures), and is designed to match the performance of the AIM-9X, IRIS-T and the ASRAAM. The R-74M2 completed trials in 2019, and its export variant RVV-MD2 was unveiled in 2023. A clean sheet design, the K-MD (izdeliye 300), is expected to supersede the R-74M2 in the future.

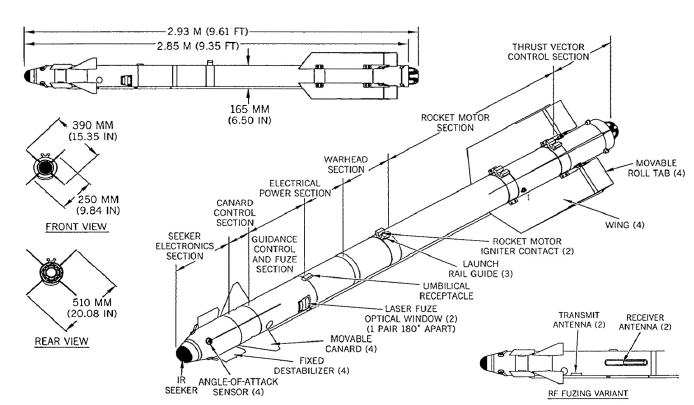

== Operational history ==
On 24 February 1996, two Cessna 337s of the Brothers to the Rescue were shot down while flying over international waters 10 nautical miles outside of Cuban airspace by a Cuban Air Force MiG-29UB. Each of the aircraft was downed by an R-73 missile.

During the Eritrean-Ethiopian War from May 1998 to June 2000, R-73 missiles were used in combat by both Ethiopian Su-27s and Eritrean MiG-29s. It was the IR-homing R-60 and the R-73 that were used in all but two of the kills.

On 18 March 2008, a MiG-29 Fulcrum of the Russian Air Force intercepted a Georgian Elbit Hermes 450 UAV over Abkhazia. The MiG-29 destroyed the UAV with an R-73 missile.

On 27 February 2019, Indian officials claimed that an IAF MiG-21 Bison had successfully engaged and shot down a Pakistani F-16 with an R-73E missile during the 2019 Jammu and Kashmir airstrikes. Pakistan denied the loss of its aircraft.

On 7 May 2022, Ukrainian Colonel Ihor Bedzai was killed when his Mi-14 helicopter was shot down by a Russian Su-35. It is reported that after missing its first shots using its 30 mm cannon, the Su-35 resorted to launching an R-73, which destroyed the helicopter.

=== Use as a surface-to-air missile ===
==== Serbia ====
According to an unconfirmed report, Serbia developed and used a ground-launched version of the R-73 in 1999. Two missiles were fitted on a modified M53/59 Praga chassis with the twin 30 mm cannons replaced by two launch rails.

==== Yemen ====
The Houthi movement's Missile Research and Development Centre and the Missile Force have tried to fire R-27/R-60/R-73/R-77, from Yemeni Air Force stocks, against Saudi aircraft. The issue for the R-27R and R-77 is the lack of a radar to support their guidance to the target. However the R-27T, R-73 and R-60 are infrared heat seeking missiles. They only require power, liquid nitrogen "to cool the seeker head", and a pylon to launch the missile. These missiles have been paired with "US made FLIR Systems ULTRA 8500 turrets". However the drawback is that these missiles are intended to be fired from one jet fighter against another. So the motors and fuel load are smaller than a purpose-built surface to air missile. Only one near miss has been verified and that was a R-27T fired at Royal Saudi Air Force F-15SA.

According to the War Zone the Houthi designation for modified R-73s is Thaqib-1. Ground-based improvised infrared sensors systems and radars are believed to be used to help the missiles acquire and track their targets.

==== Ukraine ====
During the Russian invasion of Ukraine, the Ukrainians have repurposed their inventory of R-73s for the surface-to-air role, mounting them on a large variety of platforms including the Gravehawk, modified 9K33 Osas, Humvees, and naval drones.

On 6 May 2024, Russia released footage of a Ka-29 helicopter using gunfire on a Sea Baby naval drone. The drone was armed with a R-73 infrared missile, to defend it from helicopters. One missile had been fired, at a Mi-8 helicopter, but missed before the drone was destroyed by gunfire. In December of the same year, Ukraine released footage of a Magura V5 naval drone firing an R-73 missile and hitting a Russian Mi-8 helicopter. According to the Main Directorate of Intelligence (HUR), the pictured Mi-8 was destroyed, while a second helicopter was damaged but managed to return to base. This would mark the first time in history a USV (unmanned surface vehicle) shot down an aircraft.

== Variants ==
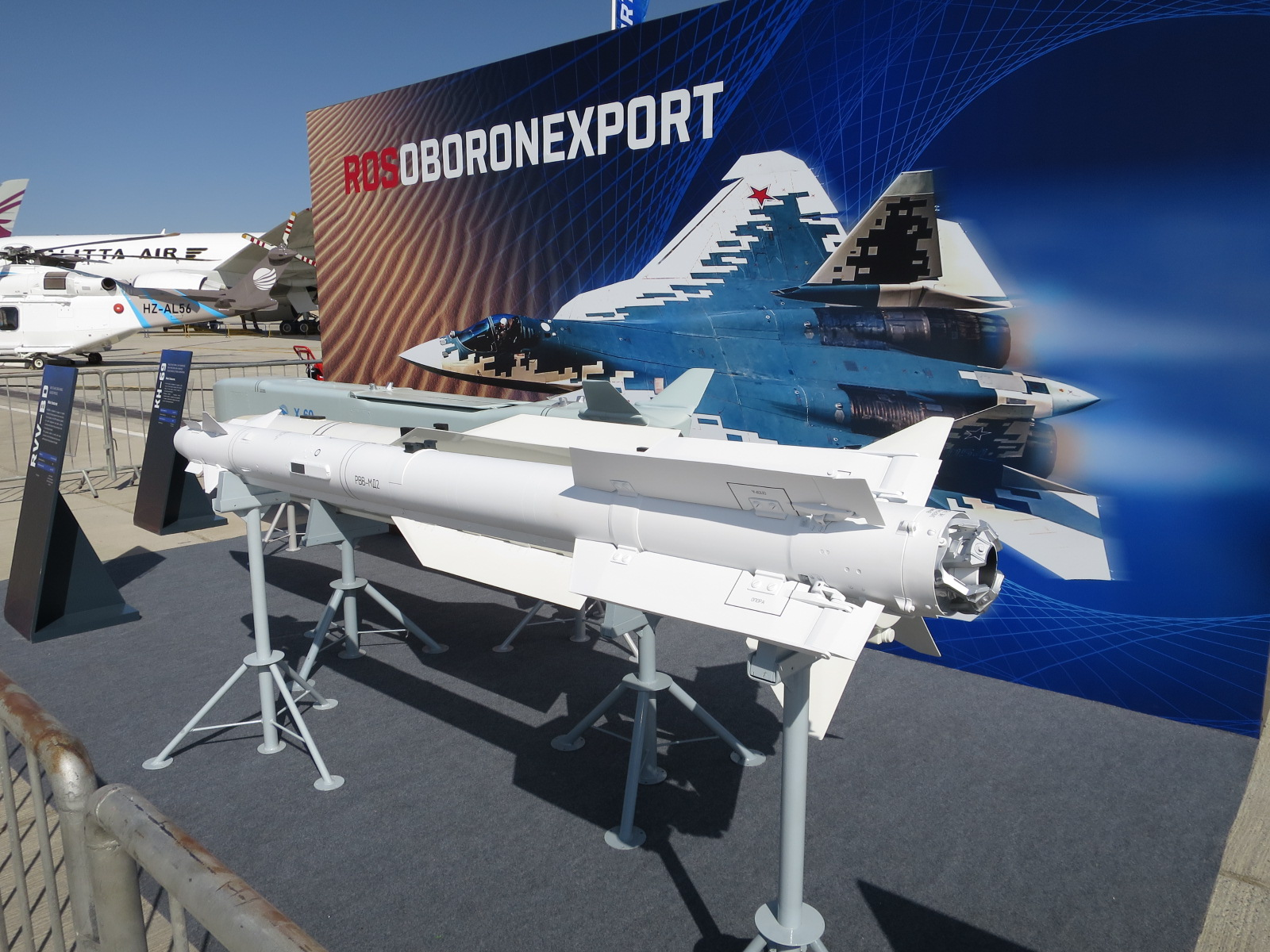
RVV-MD2 mockup at the 2023 Dubai Air Show

- R-73 − Standard model with ±40° off-boresight.
- R-73E − Export version of the standard model with ±45° off-boresight. The missile has a maximum range of 30 kilometres (19 mi) with 8 kg warhead.
- R-74 (izdeliye 740) − Improved model with ±60° off-boresight.
- RVV-MD − Export model of the R-74 with ±75° off-boresight. The missile has a maximum range of 40 kilometres (25 mi) with 8 kg warhead.
- R-74M (izdeliye 750) − Improved model with ±75° off-boresight.
- R-74M2 (izdeliye 760) − Further improved variant with reduced cross-section for the Sukhoi Su-57. The missile has an inertial navigation system and fin span reduced to 434 mm (17.1 in). Implements IRCCM.
- RVV-MD2 − Export model of the R-74M2.
- Thaqib-1 − Houthi modification into a surface-to-air missile.
- Sea Dragon − Ukrainian modification for use in unmanned surface vehicles.

== Operators ==
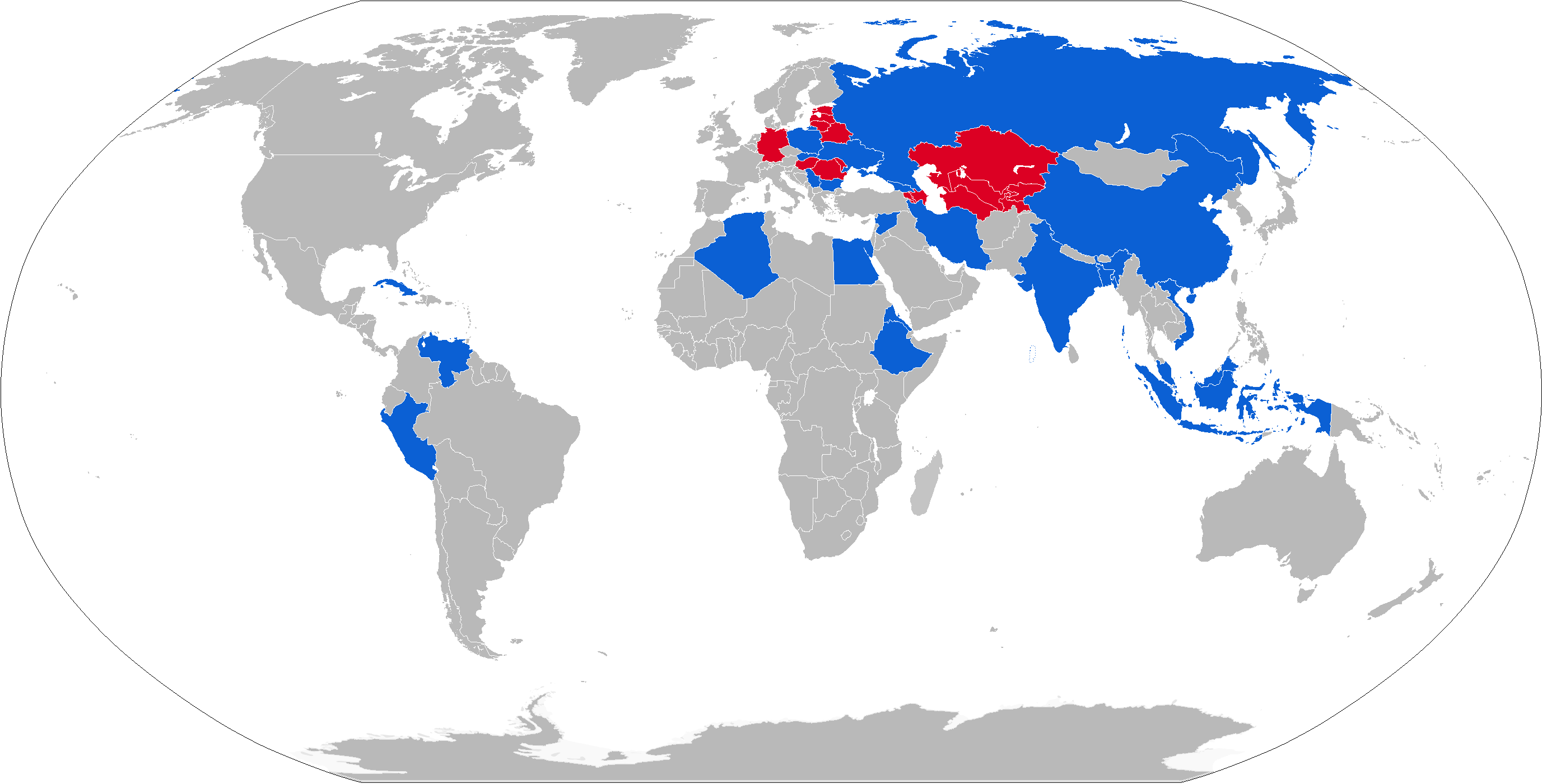
Operators Current Former

=== Current ===
- Algeria
- Angola
- Armenia
- Azerbaijan
- Bangladesh
- Belarus
- Bulgaria
- China
- Egypt
- Eritrea
- Ethiopia
- Georgia − Used on Su-25KM Scorpion.
- India − Used by the Naval Air Arm and Air Force.
- Indonesia
- Iran
- Kazakhstan
- North Korea
- Malaysia
- Mongolia
- Myanmar
- Peru
- Poland
- Russia − Used by Naval Aviation and Aerospace Forces.
- Serbia
- Sudan
- Turkmenistan
- Uganda
- Ukraine
- Uzbekistan
- Venezuela
- Vietnam

=== Non-state actors ===
- Houthis
- (Libya) Libyan National Army

=== Former ===
- Cuba − Used on MiG-29s, aircraft are no longer operational.
- Czechoslovakia
- Czech Republic
- East Germany
- Germany
- Hungary
- Iraq
- Moldova
- Romania
- Serbia and Montenegro
- Slovakia
- Soviet Union − Passed to successor states.
- Syria
- Yemen
- Yugoslavia − Passed on to successor states.

=== Evaluation-only ===
- United States − 100 missiles purchased in 1997.
