= Timeline of transportation technology =

This is a timeline of transportation technology and technological developments in the culture of transportation.

== Antiquity ==
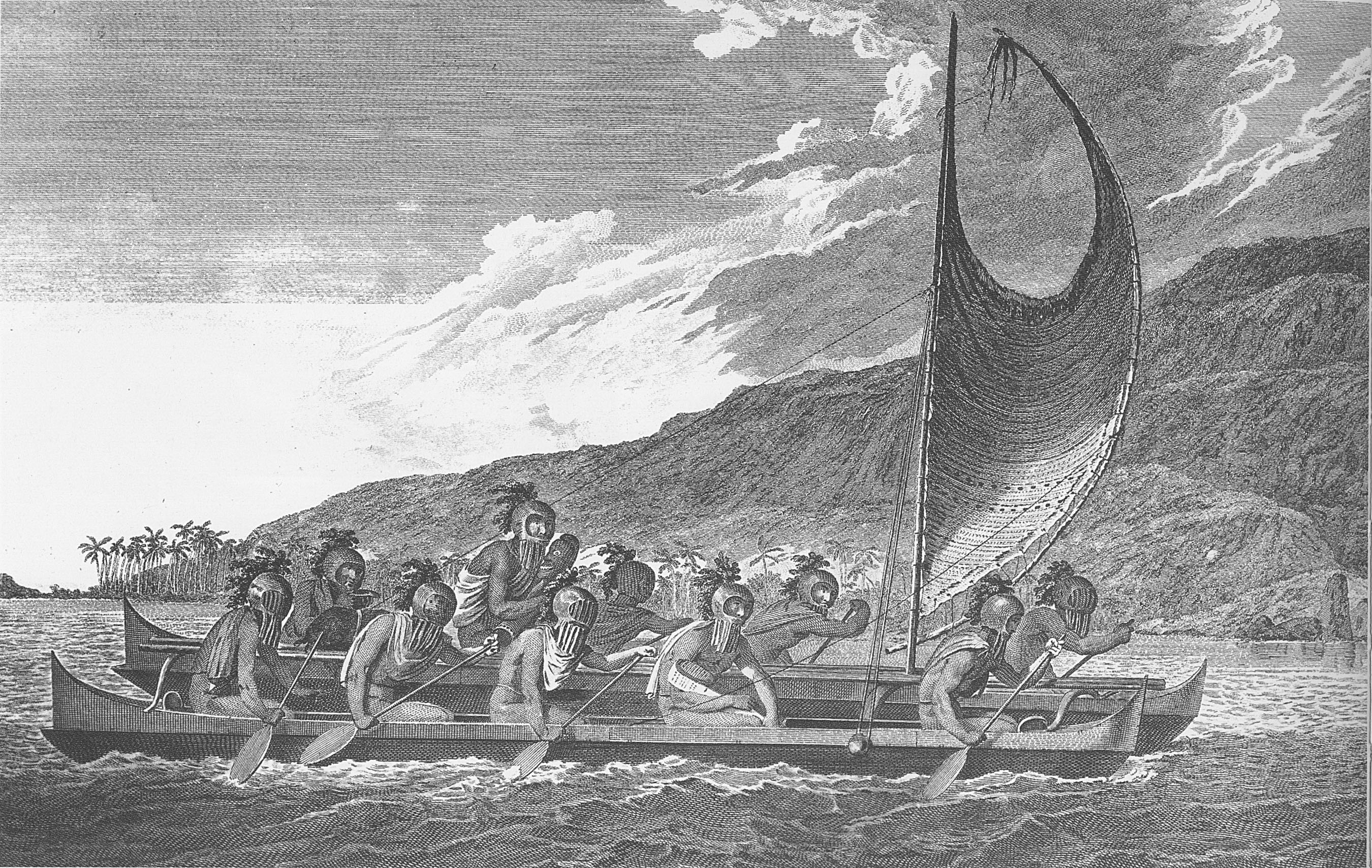
A traditional Polynesian catamaran

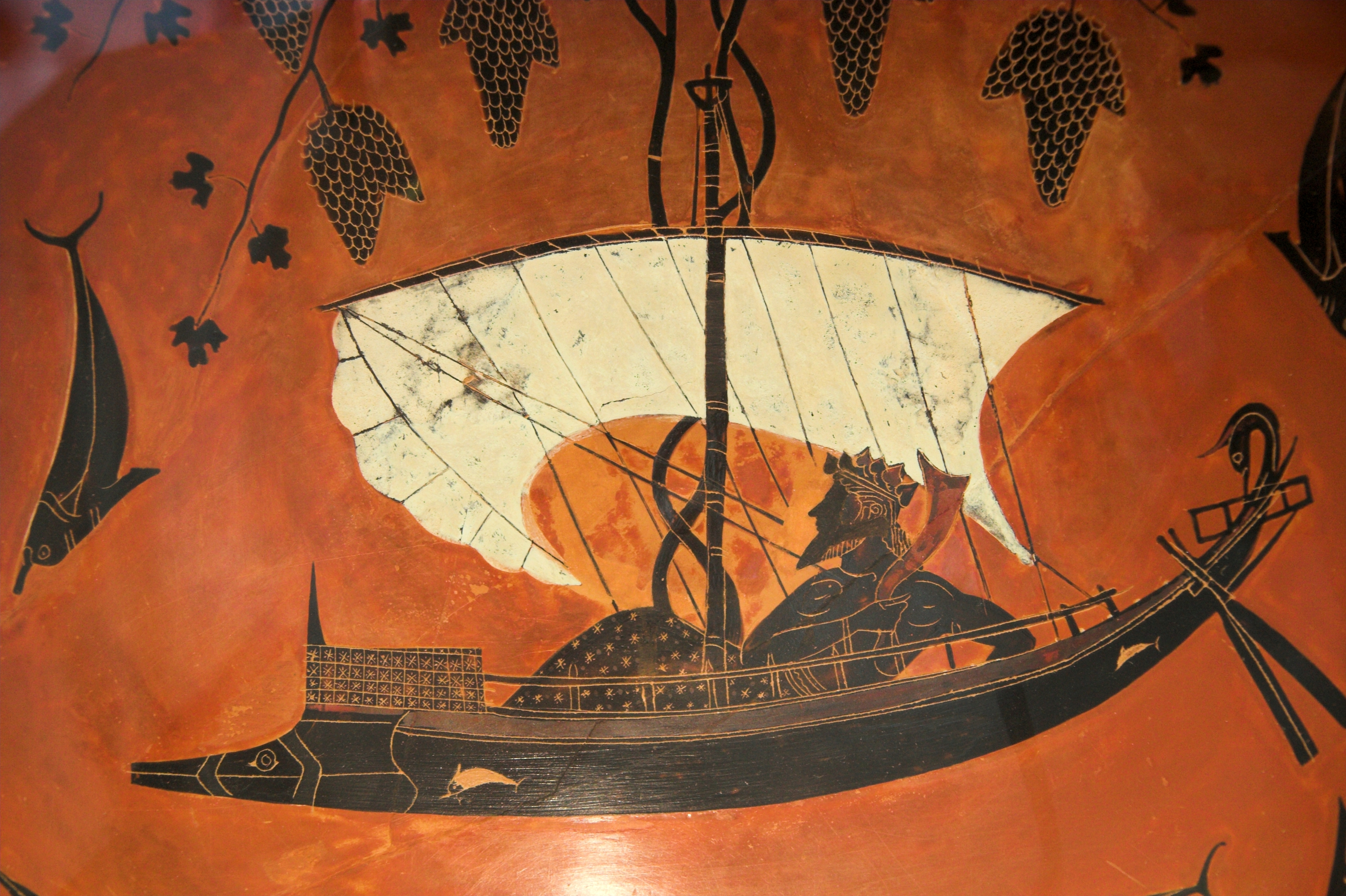
Dionysus riding on a small galley-like craft in a painting from the Dionysus cup by Exekias, from c. 530 BC

- 20th millennium BC – rafts used on rivers.
- 7th millennium BC – Earliest known shoes.
- 6th millennium BC – Dugout canoes constructed.
- 4th millennium BC – The earliest vehicles may have been ox carts.
- 3500 BCE – Domestication of the horse and invention of the wheel in Ancient Near East
- Toys excavated from the Indus Valley Civilisation (3010–1500 BC) include small carts.
- 3000 BCE – Austronesians construct catamarans and outriggers.
  - In the Mediterranean, galleys were developed about 3000 BC.
- 2nd millennium BC – Cart mentioned in literature; chariot and spoked wheel invented.
- 800 BC – Canal for transport constructed in Ancient China.
- 408 BC – Wheelbarrow referenced in Ancient Greece.

== Middle Ages ==
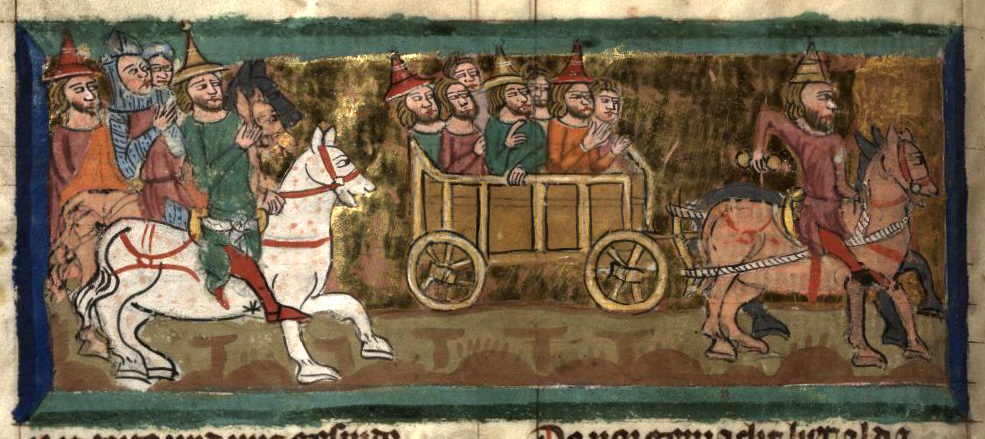
Horse collars and cart between 1350 and 1375

- 5th century – Horse collar invented in China.
- 6th century – Evidence of a horseshoe in the tomb of the Frankish King Childeric I, Tournai, Belgium.
- Late 7th century – First suspension bridge, Maya Bridge at Yaxchilan
- 800 – The streets of Baghdad are paved with tar.
- 9th century – The sine quadrant, was invented by Muhammad ibn Musa al-Khwarizmi in the 9th century at the House of Wisdom in Baghdad. The other types were the universal quadrant, the horary quadrant and the astrolabe quadrant.
- 10th century – sea-going junk ships built in China.
- Late 10th century – Kamal invented in Arab world.
- 1044 – Compass invented in China.
- 13th century (or before) – Rocket missiles used in China. Rocket powered passenger vehicles did not appear until 1939.
- 1350 – Compass dial invented by Ibn al-Shatir.
- 1479–1519 – Da Vinci sketches pedalo.
- 1495–1504 –
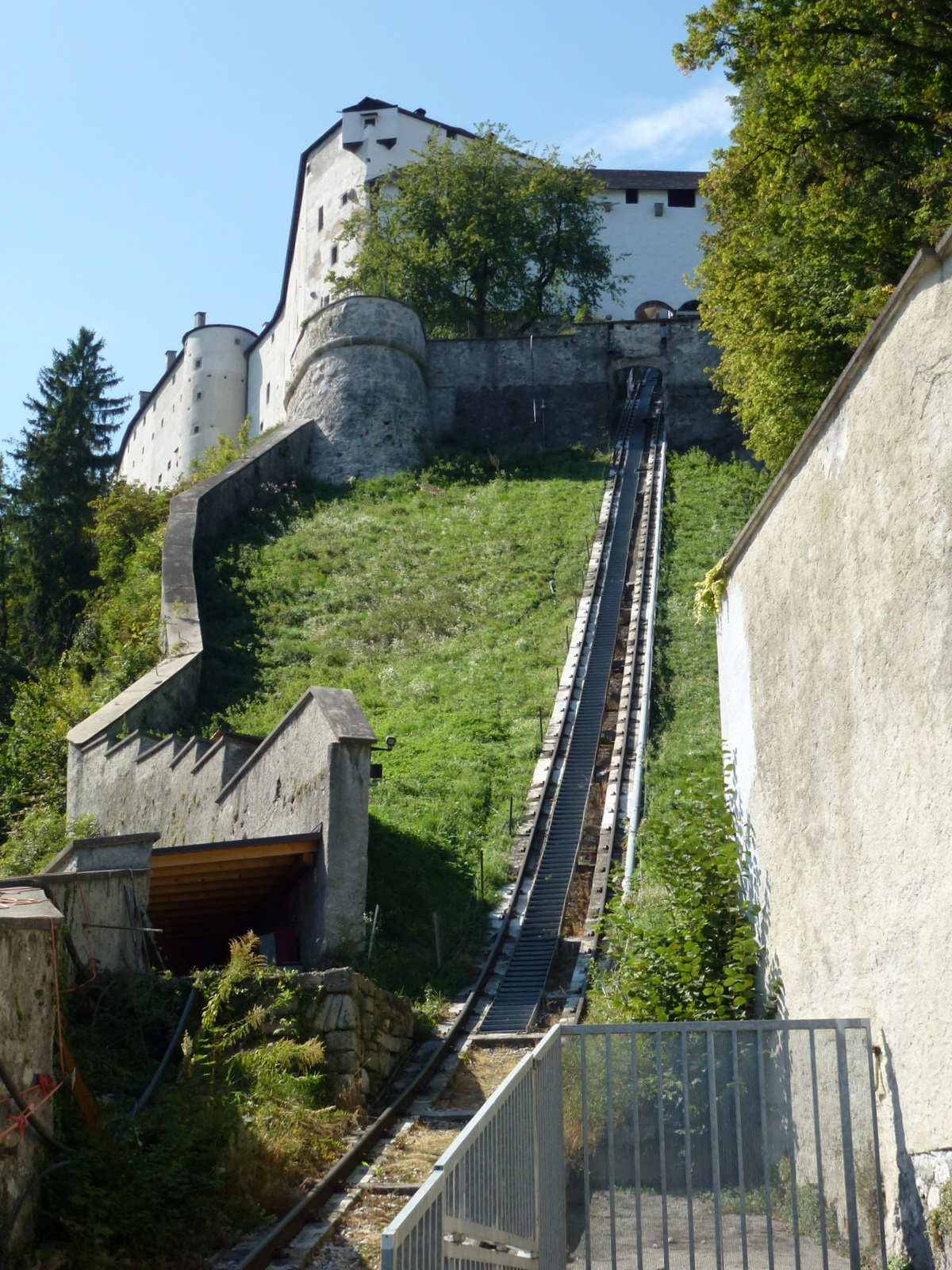
  Reisszug, as it appeared in 2011
  The oldest extant cable railway is probably the Reisszug, a private line providing goods access to Hohensalzburg Fortress at Salzburg in Austria. This line is generally described as the oldest funicular.
- 15th century – Jan Žižka built the precursor to the motorised tank, armoured wagons equipped with cannons.
- 1569 – Mercator 1569 world map published.
- Late 16th century – European sailing ships become advanced enough to reliably cross oceans.

== 17th century ==
- 1604 – The world's first recorded overland wagonway, the 2-mile (3.2 km) Wollaton Wagonway, is built by Huntingdon Beaumont in Nottingham, England, for the transport of coal.
- 1616 - The first recorded mechanical ropeway was by Croatian Fausto Veranzio who designed a bicable passenger ropeway
- 1620 – Cornelius Drebbel builds the world's first known submarine, which is propelled by oars (although there are earlier ideas for and depictions of submarines).
- 1644 - Adam Wybe builds world's first cable car on multiple supports. It was the biggest built until the end of the 19th century.
- 1655 - Stephan Farffler was a Nuremberg watchmaker of the seventeenth century whose invention of a manumotive carriage in 1655 is widely considered to have been the first self-propelled wheelchair.
- 1662 – Blaise Pascal invents a horse-drawn public bus which has a regular route, schedule, and fare system.
- 1672 – Ferdinand Verbiest built what may have been the first steam-powered scale model car.

== 18th century ==
- 1716 – Swedish scientist, Emanuel Swedenborg, creates the first concept of a hovering vehicle.
- 1720 - Differential gear invented by Joseph Williamson.
- 1731 - Sextant first implemented to accurately determine latitude.
- 1733 - William Kent developed an early stroller.
- 1740 – Jacques de Vaucanson debuted his clockwork powered carriage.
- 1760s - Inline skates invented.
- 1761 - Marine chronometer invented as a means to accurately determine longitude.
- 1769 – Nicolas-Joseph Cugnot demonstrates his fardier à vapeur, an experimental steam-driven artillery tractor
- 1776 – First submarine to be propelled by screws, and the first military submarine to attempt an attack on a ship, Turtle, is built by David Bushnell. The attack fails to sink HMS Eagle.
- 1779 - The Iron Bridge built in Shropshire.
- 1783 - First parachute.
- 1783 – Joseph Montgolfier and Étienne Montgolfier launch the first hot air balloons triggering Balloonomania.
- 1783 – Jacques Charles and Les Frères Robert (Anne-Jean Robert and Nicolas-Louis Robert) launch the first Hydrogen balloon.
- 1784 – William Murdoch built a working model of a steam locomotive carriage in Redruth, England.
- 1789 - The pedal powered tricycle was invented by two Frenchmen, named Blanchard and Maguier.
- 1790s – Canal Mania, an intense period of canal building in England and Wales.

== 19th century ==
=== Early 19th century ===
- 1801 – Richard Trevithick ran a full-sized steam 'road locomotive' on the road in Camborne, England.
- 1803 – Richard Trevithick built his 10-seater London Steam Carriage.
- 1803 – William Symington's Charlotte Dundas, generally considered to be the world's first practical steamboat, makes her first voyage.
- 1804 – Richard Trevithick built a prototype steam-powered railway locomotive and it ran on the Pen-y-Darren Line near Merthyr Tydfil Wales.
- 1804 – Oliver Evans (claimed to have) demonstrated a steam-powered amphibious vehicle.
- 1807 – Francois Isaac de Rivaz – the De Rivaz engine, the first internal combustion engine using hydrogen as a fuel
- 1807 - The Swansea and Mumbles Railway ran the world's first passenger horsecar tram service.
- 1807 – Robert Fulton's North River Steamboat, the world's first commercially successful steamboat, makes her maiden voyage.
- 1807 – Nicéphore Niépce installed his Pyréolophore internal combustion engine in a boat and powered up the river Saone in France.
- 1807 – Isaac de Rivas made a hydrogen gas powered internal combustion engine and mounted it on a vehicle.
- 1809 - First stone laid of first 'guided bus' passenger wagonway Gloucester and Cheltenham Tramroad.
- 1812 – First commercially successful self-propelled engine on land was Matthew Murray's Salamanca on Middleton Railway using toothed wheels and rail.
- 1812 – Timothy Hackworth's "Puffing Billy" ran on smooth Cast Iron Rails at Wylam Colliery near Newcastle
- 1814 – George Stephenson built the first practical steam-powered railway locomotive "Blutcher" at Killingworth Colliery.
- 1816 – The most likely originator of the Bicycle is the German, Baron Karl von Drais, who rode his 1816 machine while collecting taxes from his tenants.
- 1819 – SS Savannah, the first vessel to cross the Atlantic Ocean partly under steam power, arrives at Liverpool, England from Savannah, Georgia.
- 1819 - Denis Johnson invents kick scooter.
- 1822 – Stephenson built a locomotive and designed the railway for Hetton Colliery which is first railway not to use any horse-traction but it did have several rope hauled sections.
- 1822 – First Meeting of Liverpool Manchester Railway Company Permanent Committee.
- 1825 - Stephenson's Locomotion No. 1 runs on Stockton & Darlington Railway which opens as first public railway and uses horses and self-propelled steam engines and stationary engines with ropes along a single track. No stations and no timetables as anyone could hire the track to use their own vehicle on it.
- 1825 – Sir Goldsworthy Gurney invented a series of steam-powered passenger carriages and by 1829 completed the 120-mile journey from London to Bath, Somerset and back.
- 1825 - The first suspension railway was opened at Cheshunt, England, United Kingdom on 25 June.
- 1826 – Bill passed for Liverpool and Manchester Railway at second attempt and George Stephenson commences work on 35-mile twin track line permitting simultaneous travel in both directions between the 2 towns. Means of traction not specified to reduce opposition.
- 1828 – Stephenson's "Lancashire Witch" runs on Bolton and Leigh Railway line - a public goods line to connect Leeds and Liverpool Canal and Manchester Bolton & Bury Canal. Railway has rope hauled and self-propelled steam engines and single track.
- 1829 – Rainhill Trials to find best self-propelled engine for Liverpool Manchester line are won by Robert Stephenson's Rocket proving there is no need for horse traction or static engines on the main line. Rocket becomes basic formula for all future steam engines with boiler tubes, blast pipe, and the use of coal rather than coke.
- 1830 – Liverpool and Manchester Railway opens. First public transport system without animal traction, first public line with no rope hauled sections for main journey, first twin track, first railway between 2 large towns, first timetabled trains, first railway stations, first train faster than a mail coach, first tunnels under streets, first proper modern railway which formed the template for all subsequent railways.
- 1837 - The first electric locomotive built in 1837 was a battery locomotive. It was built by chemist Robert Davidson of Aberdeen in Scotland, and it was powered by galvanic cells (batteries).
- 1838 – Isambard Kingdom Brunel's SS Great Western, the first purpose-built transatlantic steamship, inaugurates the first regular transatlantic steamship service.
- 1839 - An early electric boat was developed by the German inventor Moritz von Jacobi in 1839 in St Petersburg, Russia. It was a 24-foot (7.3 m) boat which carried 14 passengers at 3 miles per hour (4.8 km/h). It was successfully demonstrated to Emperor Nicholas I of Russia on the Neva River.
- 1840s – Railway Mania sweeps UK and Ireland. 6,220 miles (10,010 km) of railway line were built
- 1843 - Dalkey Atmospheric railway opens.
- 1847 - The first steam railcar was designed by James Samuel, the Eastern Counties Railway Locomotive Engineer, built by William Bridges Adams in 1847, and trialled between Shoreditch and Cambridge on 23 October 1847.
- 1849 - Sir George Cayley's gliders achieved brief wing-borne hops from around 1849.

=== Late 19th century ===
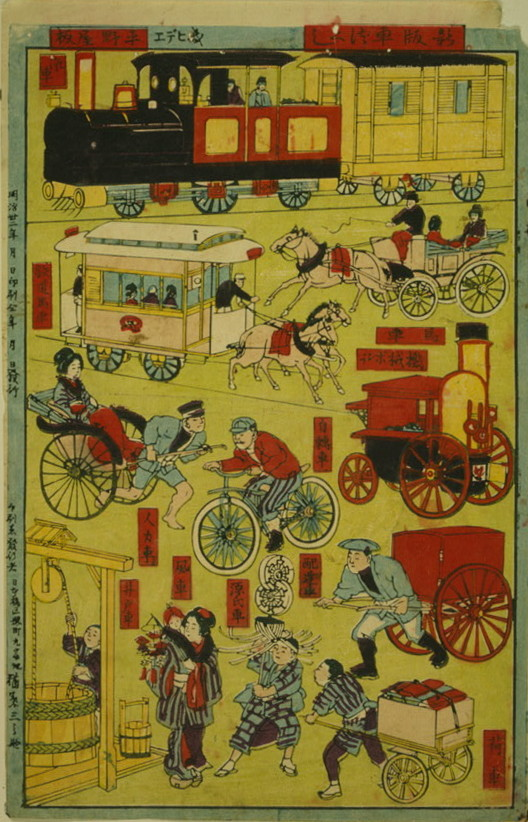
Late 19th century modes of transport, Japan.

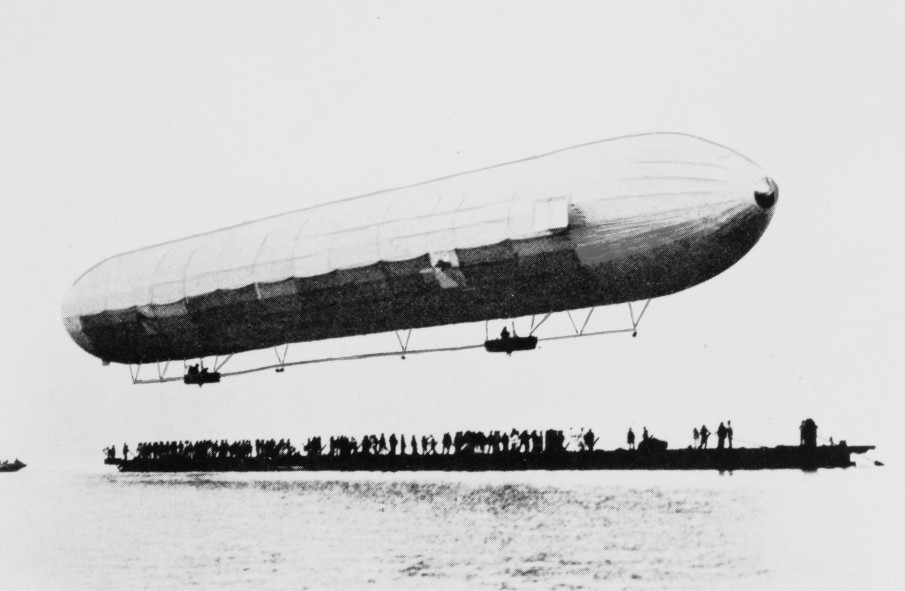
First Zeppelin ascent, 1900

- 1852 – Elisha Otis invents the safety elevator.
- 1853 – Sir George Cayley built and demonstrated the first heavier-than-air aircraft (a glider).
  - - Quadracycle invented.
- 1859 - First model railway for Napoléon, Prince Imperial.
- 1859 - Gaston Planté invented the lead–acid battery, the first-ever battery that could be recharged by passing a reverse current through it.
- 1860 - first urban horse railway line (a predecessor of trams), opened in Saint Petersburg.
- 1862 – Étienne Lenoir made a gasoline engine automobile.
- 1863 – London's Metropolitan Railway opened to the public as the world's first underground railway.
- 1863 – Étienne Lenoir– Hippomobile
- 1867 – First modern motorcycle was invented.
- 1868 – Safety bicycle invented.
- 1868 – George Westinghouse invented the compressed-air brake for railway trains.
- 1868 – Louis-Guillaume Perreaux's steam velocipede, a steam engine attached to a Michaux velocipede.
- 1869 - Jules Suriray, a Parisian bicycle mechanic, designed the first radial style ball bearing.
- 1870 - First definite record of a kicksled.
- 1874 - Midland railway introduces the first bogie.
- 1875 - World's first electric tram line operated in Sestroretsk near Saint Petersburg, Russia, invented and tested by Fyodor Pirotsky.
- 1880 – Werner von Siemens builds first electric elevator.
- 1881 - World's first commercially successful electric tram, the Gross-Lichterfelde tramway in Lichterfelde near Berlin in Germany built by Werner von Siemens who contacted Pirotsky. It initially drew current from the rails, with overhead wire being installed in 1883.
- 1882 - The trolleybus dates back to 29 April 1882, when Dr. Ernst Werner Siemens demonstrated his "Elektromote" in a Berlin suburb. This experiment continued until 13 June 1882
- 1883 - Mödling and Hinterbrühl Tram, Vipenna, Austria, first electric tram powered by overhead wire.
- 1884 - Thomas Parker built a practical production electric car in Wolverhampton using his own specially designed high-capacity rechargeable batteries.
- 1885 – Karl Benz invents the first car powered by an internal combustion engine, he called it the Benz Patent Motorwagen.
- 1887 - The first Battery electric multiple unit (battery rail car) was used on the Royal Bavarian State Railways.
- 1888 - Flocken Elektrowagen built by German inventor Andreas Flocken, the first true electric car.
- 1889 - The first interurban tram-train to emerge in the United States was the Newark and Granville Street Railway in Ohio, which opened in 1889.
- 1889 - First introduced in 1889, battery vehicles milk floats expanded use in 1931 and by 1967 gave Britain the largest electric vehicle fleet in the world.
- 1890s – Bike boom sweeps Europe and America with hundreds of bicycle manufacturers in the biggest bicycle craze to date
- 1890 - The City and South London Railway (C&SLR) was the first deep-level underground "tube" railway in the world, (Note: A "tube" railway is an underground railway constructed in a cylindrical tunnel by the use of a tunnelling shield, usually deep below ground level.) and the first major railway to use electric traction
- 1893 - Recumbent bicycles invented.
- 1893 - first moving walkway debuted at the World's Columbian Exposition.
- 1893 - The Liverpool Overhead Railway opened on 6 March 1893 with 2-car electric multiple units, the first to operate in the world.
- 1893 - Frank W. Hawley adapted an ordinary steam canal boat to a trolleyboat (named after him), which was tested on the Erie Canal in the US.
- 1893 - First sidecar.
- 1894 – Hildebrand & Wolfmüller became the first motorcycle available to the public for purchase.
- 1895 - First motorbus.
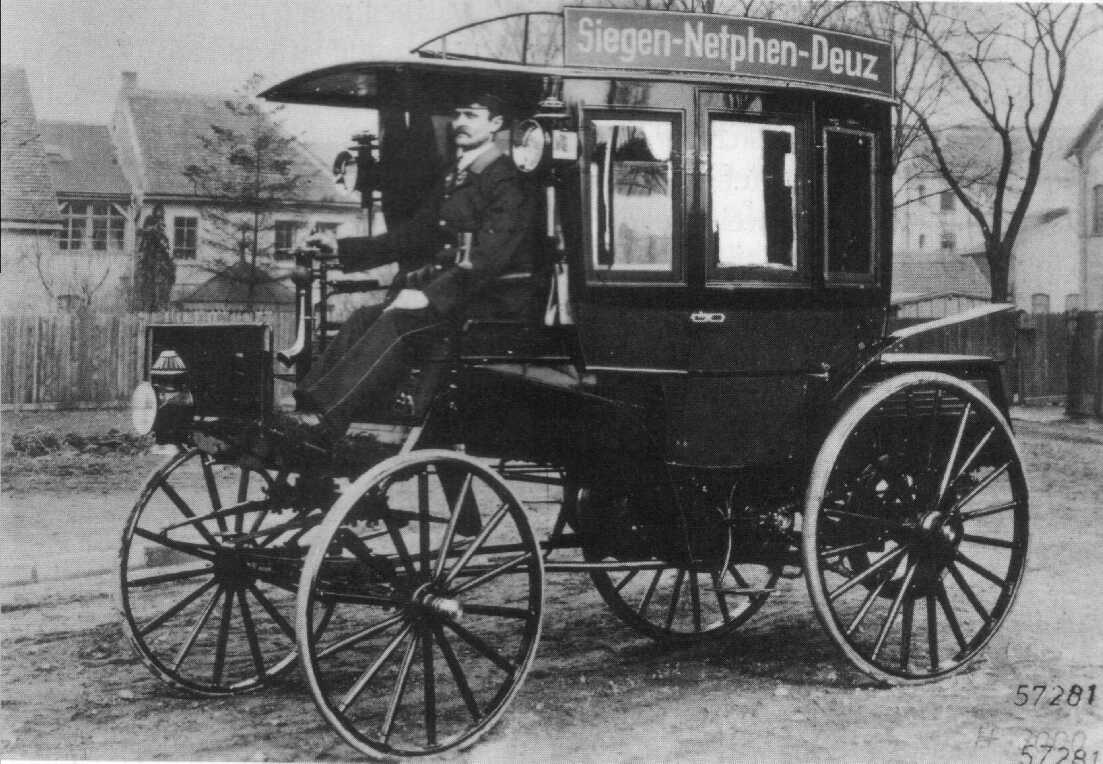
  The first internal combustion omnibus of 1895 (Siegen to Netphen)
  In Siegerland, Germany, two passenger bus lines ran briefly, but unprofitably, in 1895 using a six-passenger motor carriage developed from the 1893 Benz Viktoria.
- 1896 – Jesse W. Reno builds first escalator at Coney Island, and then reinstalls it on the Manhattan side of the Brooklyn Bridge.
- 1896 - First battery powered monorail, Ontario Southern Railway (Ontario).
- 1897 – Charles Parsons' Turbinia, the first vessel to be powered by a steam turbine, makes her debut.
- 1897 – Most likely the first electric bicycle was built in 1897 by Hosea W. Libbey.
- 1899 - The Lohner-Porsche Mixte Hybrid was both the world's first hybrid vehicle, and the first four-wheel drive without a steam engine.
- 1899 – Ferdinand von Zeppelin builds the first successful airship.
- 1900 – Ferdinand von Zeppelin launches the first successful airship.

== 20th century ==
=== Early 20th century ===
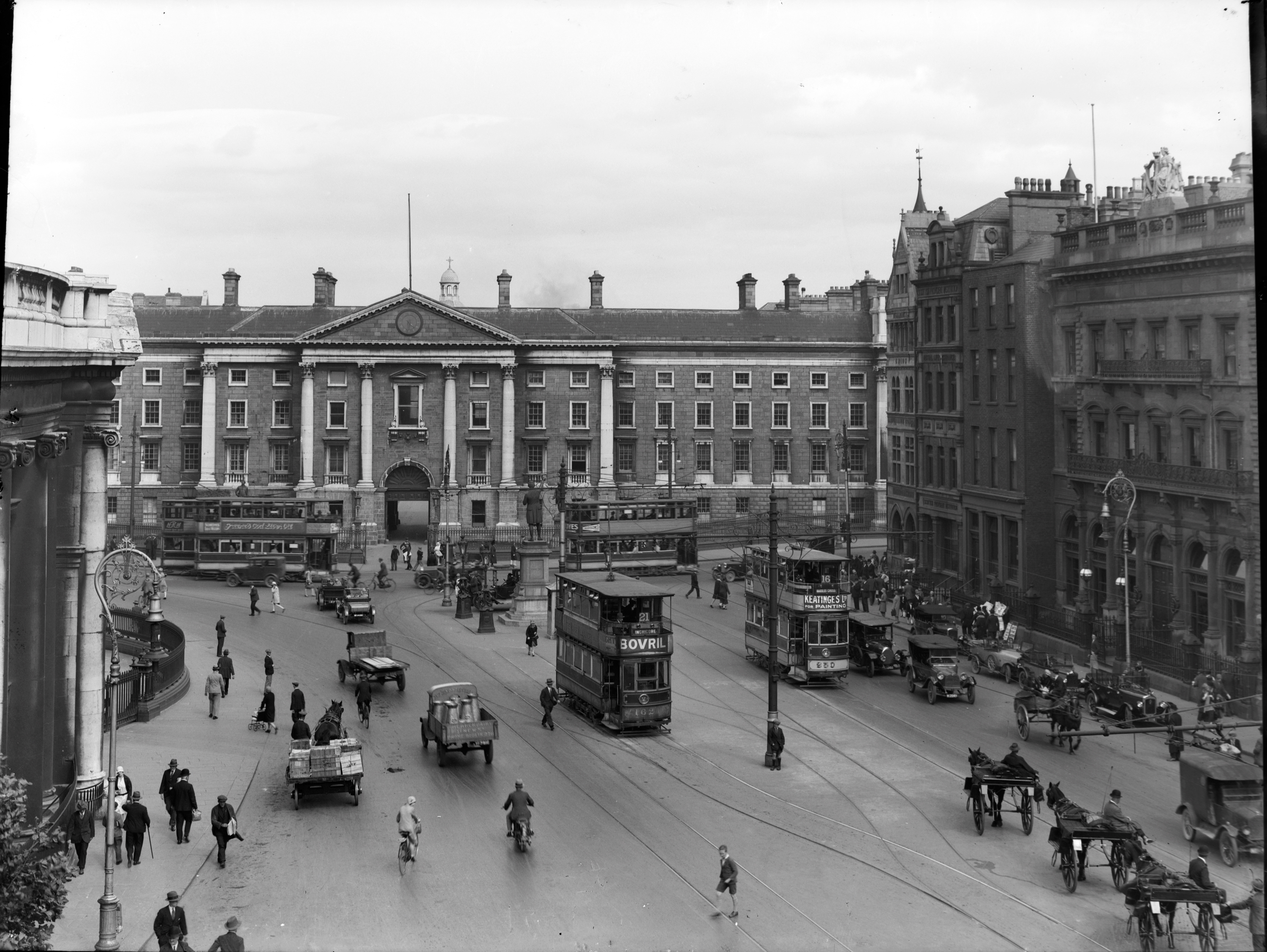
Early 20th Century modes of road transport in Dublin, 1929

- 1903
  - Orville Wright and Wilbur Wright – Fly the first motor-driven airplane.
  - Diesel engine – Tested in a canal boat by Rudolph Diesel, Adrian Bochet and Frederic Dyckhoff.
  - first diesel motorship was also the first diesel–electric ship, the Russian tanker Vandal from Branobel, which was launched in 1903
- 1904 - The first non-experimental trolleybus system was a seasonal municipal line installed near Nantasket Beach in 1904; the first year-round commercial line was built to open a hilly property to development just outside Los Angeles in 1910.
- 1906 - Early hydrofoil used by Enrico Forlanini.
- 1907 - The London Electrobus Company started running a service of battery-electric buses between London's Victoria Station and Liverpool Street on 15 July 1907.
- 1908 - the Kohlerer-funicular went into service in Bolzano. It was the first modern (enclosed) cable car in the world to carry passengers.
- 1908 – First mass-produced automobile- Henry Ford develops the assembly line method of automobile manufacturing with the introduction of the Ford Model T.
- 1910 - Fabre Hydravion first seaplane.
- 1911 – Selandia launched – First ocean-going, diesel engine-driven ship.
- 1912 - The world's first diesel locomotive (a diesel-mechanical locomotive) was operated in the summer of 1912 on the Winterthur–Romanshorn railway in Switzerland.
- 1912 - Articulated trams, invented and first used by the Boston Elevated Railway.
- 1914 - The first application of railway electric traffic light signals was by the Chicago, Milwaukee, St. Paul and Pacific Railroad's use of the US&S "Style L" colour light signal on their line through the Pacific Northwest.
- 1915
  - The Luftkissengleitboot Hovercraft – First hovering vehicle was created by Dagobert Müller. It could only travel on water.
  - Motorized scooter invented.
  - A British commission was tasked with creating a vehicle able to cross a 4 ft wide trench – the tank.
- 1916 – First tank prototype, nicknamed "mother", was created by Britain during World War I.
- 1919 - HD-4 first hydroplane launched by Alexander Graham Bell.
- 1923 - First controlled autogyro rotorcraft flight in Cierva C.4.
- 1924 - The world's first functional diesel locomotive (diesel-electric locomotive) (E^{el}2 original number Юэ 001/Yu-e 001) started operations, designed by a team led by Yuri Lomonosov and built 1923–1924 by Maschinenfabrik Esslingen in Germany.
- 1926 – Robert H. Goddard launches the first liquid-fueled rocket.
- 1928 - First Moth (dinghy) built in Inverloch.
- 1932 - The first electric golf cart was custom-made in 1932, but did not gain widespread acceptance.
- 1935 – First flight of the DC-3, one of the most significant transport aircraft in the history of aviation.
  - Hermann Kemper built a working linear induction motor.
- 1939 - 20 June - First rocket powered aircraft, the Heinkel He 176, takes flight.
- 1939 – 27 August - First jet engine aircraft, the Heinkel He 178, takes flight.
- 1940 - First fully articulated bus Isotta Fraschini TS40.
- 1942 – V2 rocket covers a distance of 200 kilometres (120 mi).
- 1943 - Traffic cone invented.
- 1947 – Chuck Yeager in the Bell X1 completes the first supersonic manned flight.

=== Late 20th Century ===
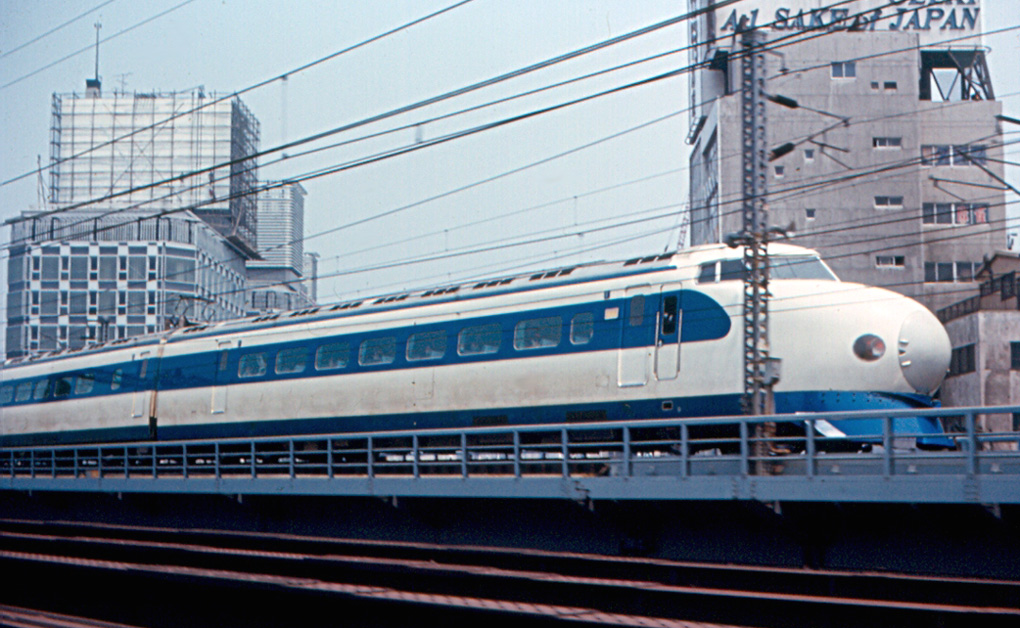
A 0 series Shinkansen high-speed rail set in Tokyo, May 1967

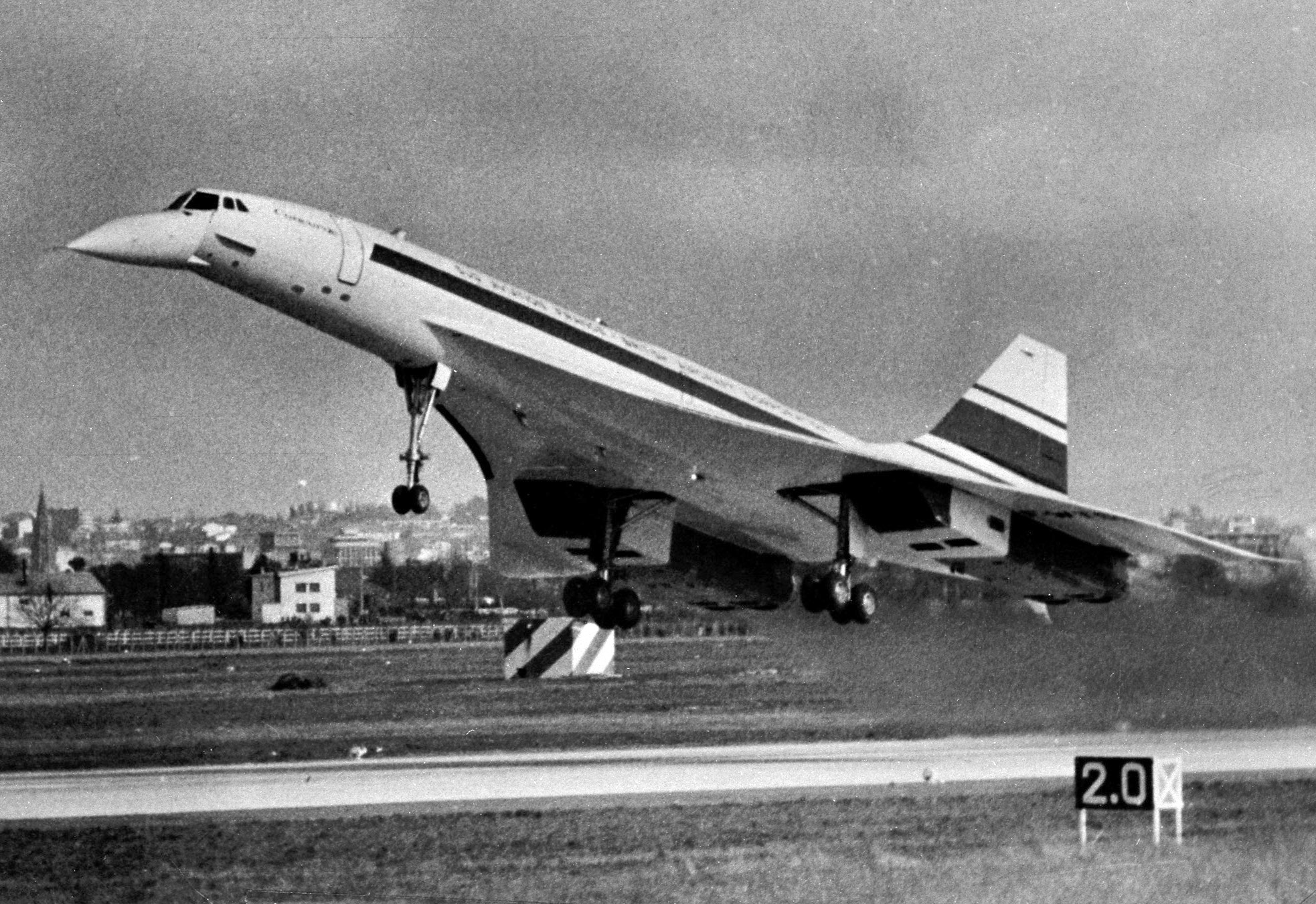
Concorde 001 first flight in 1969

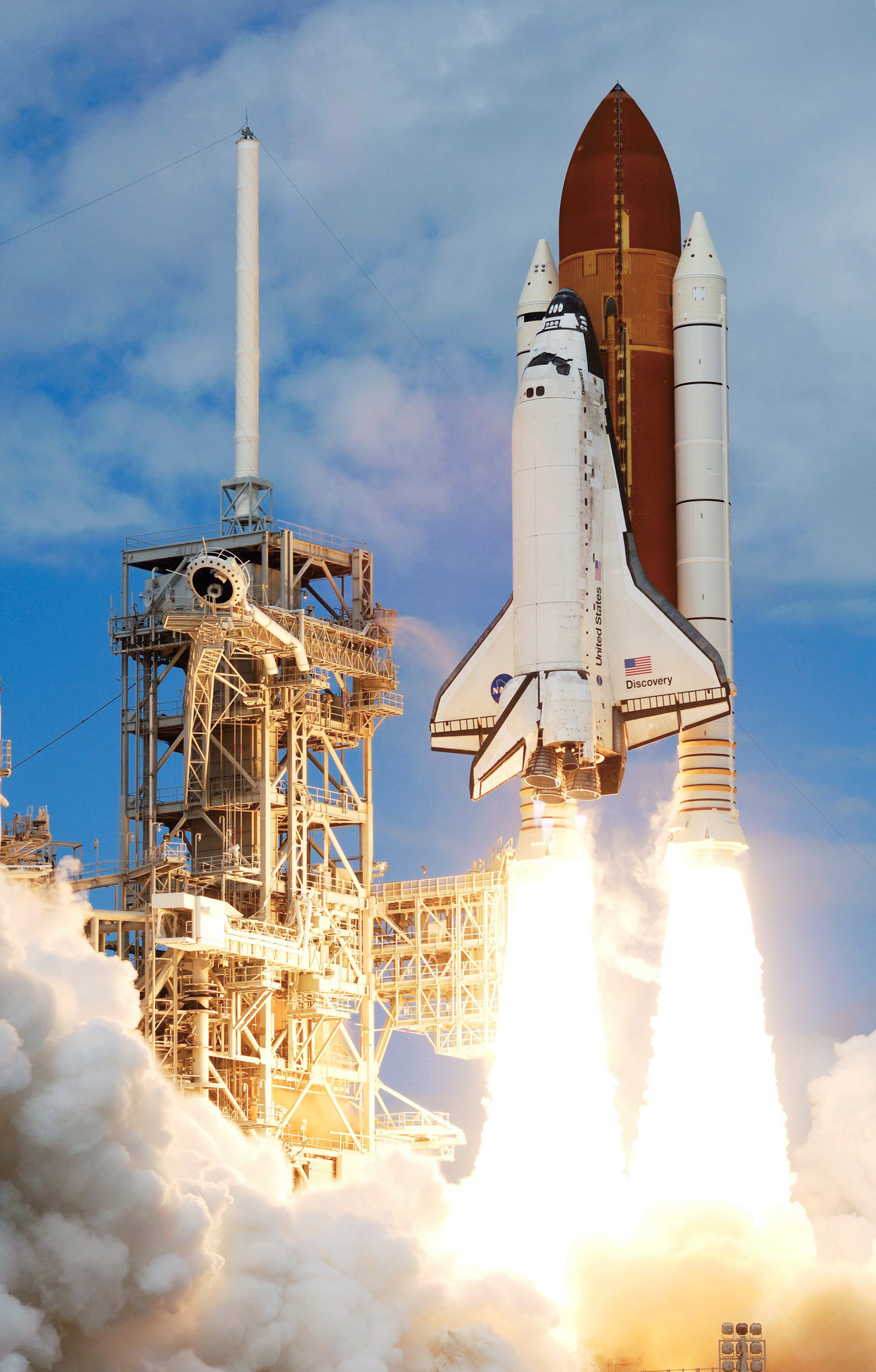
Space shuttle launch

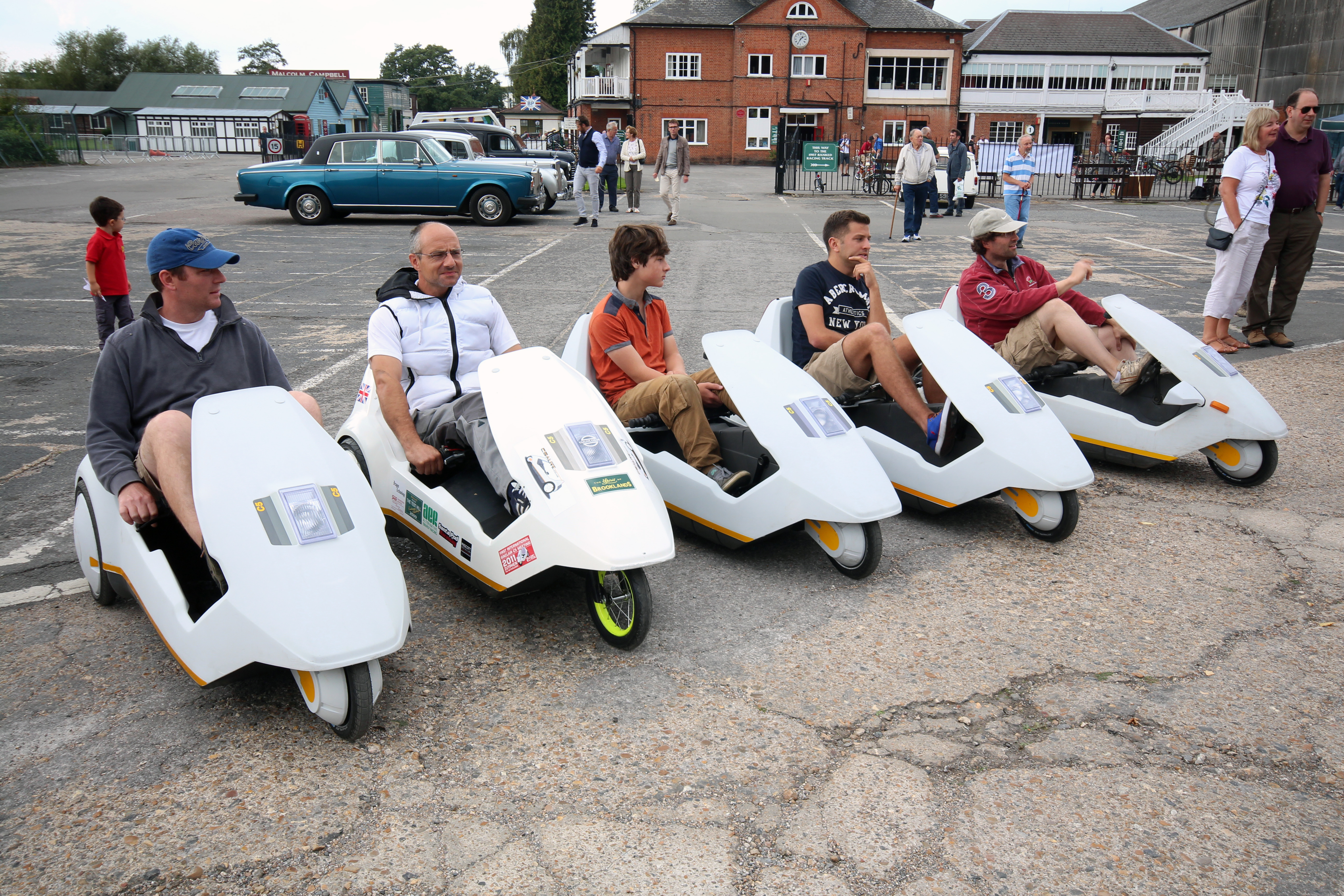
C5 enthusiasts gather at the Brooklands Museum

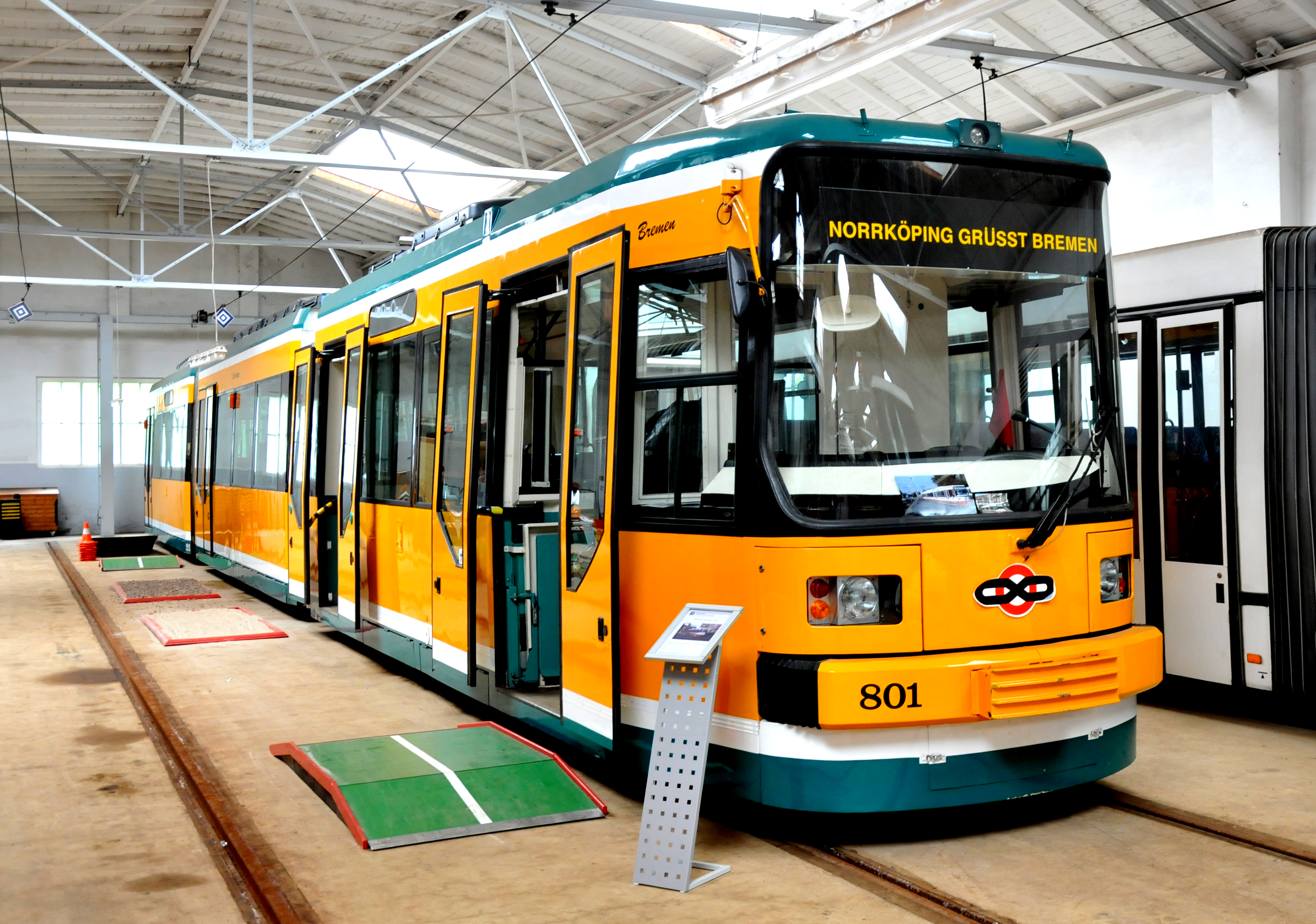
First fully low floor tram in Bremen

- 1950 – First Heritage railway.
- 1952
  - Supramar launched the first commercial high-speed craft, a hydrofoil.
  - de Havilland Comet first commercial jet air liner.
- 1955 – First nuclear-powered vessel, USS Nautilus, a submarine, is launched.
- 1956 – Demonstration of SR.N1, first modern hovercraft by Christopher Cockerell.
- 1957
  - Sputnik 1 – First artificial satellite to be launched into orbit.
  - Gateway City – World's first purpose-built container ship, enters service.
  - First flight of the Boeing 707 – First commercially successful jet airliner.
- 1959 – The first modern fuel cell vehicle was a modified Allis-Chalmers farm tractor, fitted with a 15 kilowatt fuel cell, around 1959.
- 1961 – Vostok 1, first crewed space mission, designed by Sergey Korolyov, makes two orbits around the Earth with Yuri Gagarin.
- 1962 – The first ascending-gliding parachute was developed by Pierre-Marcel Lemoigne in 1962.
- 1964 – Shinkansen first high-speed rail.
- 1966 – Caspian Sea Monster ground effect vehicle introduced.
- 1967 – Automatic train operation introduced on London Underground.
- 1968 – Space hopper invented.
- 1969
  - First flight of the Boeing 747 – First commercial widebody airliner.
  - NASA rocket technology, spurred on by the US/Russia Space Race – Makes the first crewed Moon landing a reality.
  - Lolo ball invented.
- 1971
  - Salyut 1, first space station, launched by Soviet Union.
  - Runcorn Busway was the world's first bus rapid transit system.
- 1973 – Stadtbahnwagen B hybrid tram developed.
- 1975 – Morgantown PRT, first Personal Rapid Transit system to be installed.
- 1976 – Concorde makes the world's first commercial passenger-carrying supersonic flight.
- 1977 – The first semi-automated car was developed in 1977, by Japan's Tsukuba Mechanical Engineering Laboratory, which required specially marked streets.
- 1980 – Modern guided bus passenger service introduced in Essen.
- 1981
  - Maiden flight of the Space Shuttle.
  - The first fully Automated guideway transit driverless people mover train technology introduced on Port Island Line, Japan.
- 1983 – First Automated guideway transit driverless metro, and one of the first fully driverless train technologies, Véhicule Automatique Léger introduced in Lille Metro, France.
- 1984 – First commercial maglev, albeit low-speed opens in Birmingham.
- 1985 – Sinclair C5, the first mass-produced electric battery velomobile launched.
- 1989 – Snakeboard invented.
- 1990 – First transport simulation computer game Railroad Tycoon released.
- 1990 – ADtranz low floor tram world's first completely low floor tram introduced.
- 1994 – Channel Tunnel opens.
- 1994 – Modern kickbike invented in Finland.
- 1997 – First Maglev train prototypes are tested in Japan.
- 1997 – Toyota RAV4 EV, first nickel-metal hydride batteries (NiMH) electric car. Toyota Prius first mass-produced full hybrid car.
- 1997 – Nissan R'nessa, first short-run production lithium-ion battery electric car.
- 1998 – First ion-propulsion spacecraft Deep Space 1 launched.
- 1998 – Honda Raccoon Compo, first folding electric bicycle in Japan.
- 1999 – Trikke (wiggle scooter) invented.
- 2000 – Honda Step Compo, first folding electric bicycle internationally available.
- 2000 – TransMilenio, first modern bus rapid transit.

== 21st century ==
- 2001 - Germany trials capa vehicle hybrid buses in Nuremberg using an ultracapacitor to store electrical energy.
- 2002 – Segway PT self-balancing personal transport was launched by inventor Dean Kamen.
- 2003 - Concorde makes last passenger flight.
- 2003 - First modern Ground-level power supply technology, Bordeaux tramway.
- 2003 - Germany introduces capa vehicle trams in Mannheim.
- 2003 - NE Train trials first hybrid train to use lithium-ion batteries.
- 2004 – First commercial high speed Maglev train starts operation between Shanghai and its airport.
- 2004 - First modern urban transit aerial cable car Metrocable (Medellín).
- 2008 - Tesla Roadster, first mass production lithium-ion battery electric car.
- 2009 - Škoda 15 T world's first completely low-floor tram with articulated bogies introduced.
- 2010s - Mobile apps and online platforms for finding, planning, offering and booking affordable public transport such as buses as well as carsharing, bicycle sharing and carpooling emerge and are becoming popular along with associated transportation infrastructure networks (examples: BlaBlaCar, Flixbus)
- 2010 – ULTra (rapid transit), the first modern commercial Personal Rapid Transit system to be installed. Started operations at Heathrow Airport.
- 2010 - IKAROS spacecraft launched with solar sail propulsion.
- 2013 - Self-balancing scooter invented.
- 2015 - In March, China South Rail Corporation (CSR) demonstrated the world's first hydrogen fuel cell vehicle tramcar at an assembly facility in Qingdao.
- 2015 - Navya SAS launch first autonomous bus, Navya Autonom Shuttle at Sheba Medical Center, Israel.
- 2016 - First hydrogen fuel cell powered passenger aircraft flight DLR HY4.
- 2017 - First 100% low-floor tram Ground-level power supply technology, TramWave, opening of Zhuhai tram China.
- 2018 - First driverless trams in Potsdam, Germany tested.
- 2018 - First mass-produced hydrogen fuel cell car, Toyota Mirai.
- 2018 - First electroaerodynamic thrust winged Ion-propelled aircraft test flight of MIT EAD Airframe Version 2 using ionic wind.
- 2018 – First commercial hydrogen-powered passenger train, Alstom Coradia Lint, launches in Lower Saxony, Germany.
- 2019 - The Autonomous Rail Rapid Transit opens in China.
- ~2016-2021 – Various first advanced trials of various types of autonomous delivery vehicles.

=== 2020s ===
==== Transportation technologies in society ====
- 2020 – The COVID-19 pandemic, partly due to lockdowns, temporarily drastically reduces the use of surface (including public) and air transport technologies. Cycling is an exception to this and increased during the pandemic, along with bike-sales.

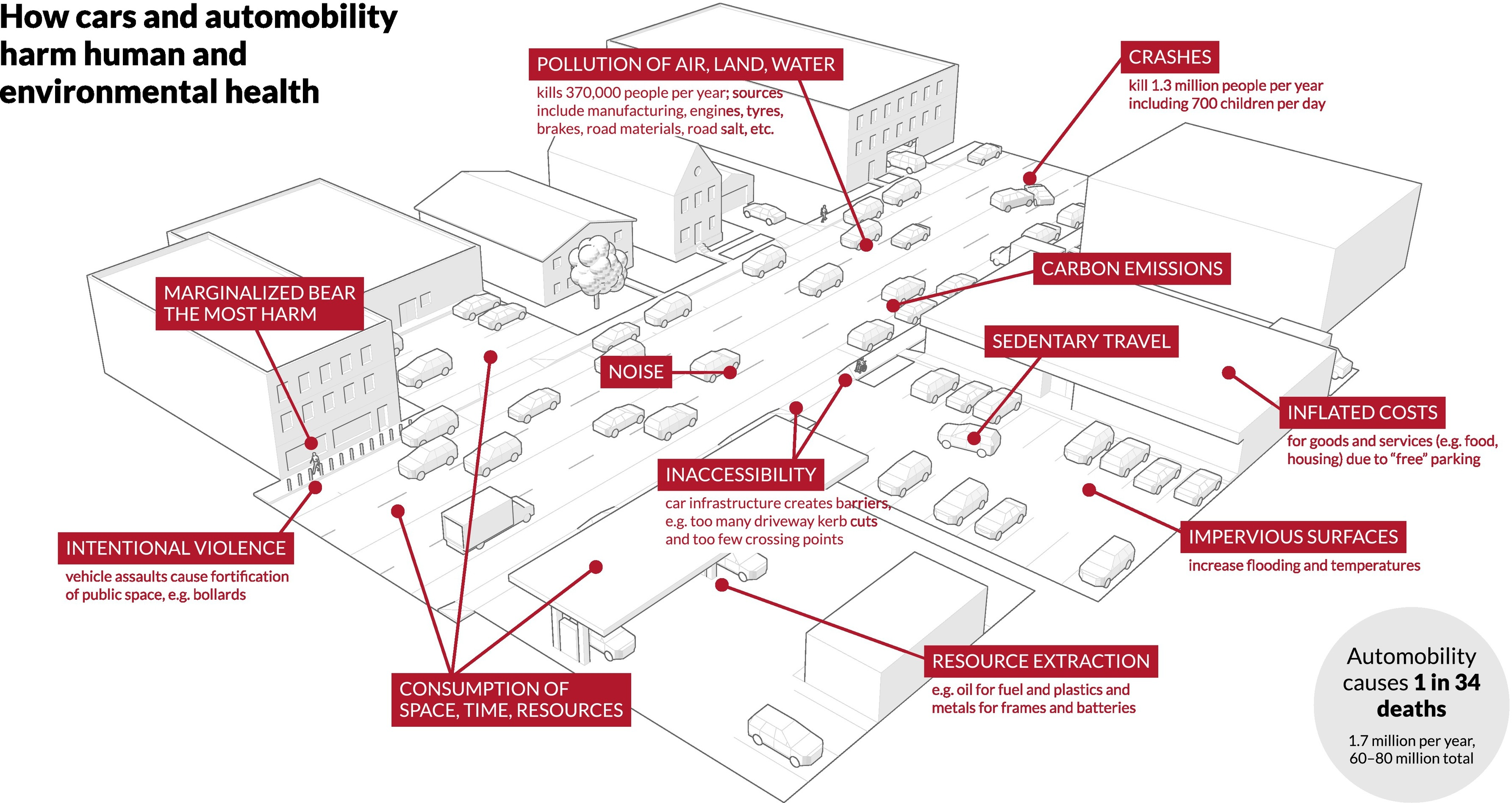
2024: A comprehensive global review of harms from personal car transport is published.

- 2022 – A study for the first time attempts to assess and quantify complete societal costs of cars (i.e. car-use, etc.) by quantifying externalities.
- 2022 – A study estimates the air pollution impacts on climate change and the ozone layer from rocket launches and re-entry of reusable components and debris in 2019 and from a theoretical future space industry extrapolated from the "billionaire space race". It concludes that substantial effects from routine space tourism should "motivate regulation".
- 2023 – A study outlines challenges of aviation decarbonization by 2050 whose identified factors mainly are future demand, continuous efficiency improvements, new short-haul engines, higher SAF (biofuel) production (including measures that affect their competitiveness and deployment), CO_{2} removal to compensate for non-CO_{2} forcing, and related policy-options. With constant air transport demand and aircraft efficiency, decarbonizing aviation would require nearly five times the 2019 worldwide biofuel production, competing with other hard-to-decarbonize sectors and land-use (or food security).
- 2024 – An analysis of Outer London's Mini-Hollands active transport infrastructures indicates Low Traffic Neighbourhoods are highly effective and cost-efficient measures in terms of health economic benefits.
- 2024 – A global review of harms from personal car automobility finds cars have killed 60–80 million people since their invention, with automobility causing roughly every 34th death, and summarises interventions that are ready for implementation to reduce the, largely crash-linked or pollution-mediated, deaths from automobility-centrism and dependency.

==== Sustainable transport ====
- 2020 – First commercial flight of a hydrogen fuel cell plane.
- 2020 – Google Maps begins including bike shares in its widely used route planning functionality.
- Early 2020s – Researchers investigate safe ways of public transport during the COVID-19 pandemic.
- 2022 – The first rail line entirely run by hydrogen-powered trains debuts in Germany. The state company owning the railway later switches to electric models since they are "cheaper to operate". Two other hydrogen trains have been reported as of 2023: Mireo Plus H by Siemens in Germany (under development) and an urban train by the Railway Rolling Stock Corporation in China.
- 2023 – The first test-runs of a superconducting maglev test line, called a hyperloop, are carried out in Datong, China (50 km/h of ~1,000 km/h). Hyperloop One conducted the world's first test carrying passengers in pods, reaching a speed of 172 km/h in Los Angeles in 2020, but reportedly abandoned the goal of transporting humans as of 2023.
- 2023 – A comeback of sleeping trains in Europe is reported as demand for more comfortable travel modes than overnight buses and sustainable transport rises. A new generation of such trains is released.

==== Autonomous vehicles ====
Milestones in autonomous sustainable / public transport vehicles are also listed in this section.

- 2020 - CR400BF-C 'Fuxing Hao', a variant of CR400 Fuxing series, running on Beijing–Zhangjiakou intercity railway is the world first high-speed rail service capable of driverless automation in commercial operations. The specific Grade of Automation (GoA) was not announced.
- Early 2020s - Multiple electric, autonomous buses open for public transport – albeit with a local professional driving-assistant – are being launched around the world after the first such bus started operating for the general public in a Swiss town in 2018.
- 2021 – The pilot project of the "world's first automated, driverless train" is launched in the city of Hamburg, Germany. The conventional, standard-track, non-metro train technology could, according to reports, theoretically be implemented for rail transport worldwide and is reported to also be substantially more energy efficient.
- 2021 – The world's first urban autonomous vessels, Roboats, are deployed in the canals of Amsterdam, Netherlands. The ships developed by three institutions could carry up to five people, collect waste, deliver goods, and provide "on-demand infrastructure".
- 2021 – The first autonomous cargo ship, MV Yara Birkeland is launched in Norway. The fully electric ship is expected to substantially reduce the need for truck journeys.

== See also ==
- 2026 in science and technology
- 2026 in aviation
- 2026 in rail transport
- Maritime timeline
- Timeline of automobiles
- Timeline of aviation
- Timeline of historic inventions
- History of the bicycle
- History of the electric vehicle
- Timeline of motorized bicycle history
- Timeline of railway history
- History of rapid transit
- Timeline of spaceflight
- Timeline of three longest spans
- Ufology
