= UAPS20 Unmanned AutoPilot System =

UAPS20 is an autopilot system that can be installed on an RHIB boat to obtain an unmanned surface vehicle.

The system is manufactured by SIEL (Italy) and is composed of:

- an Autopilot Control unit (ACU) installed on a 7.5 RHIB Rigid Hulled Inflatable Boat.
- an Operator Control Unit (OCS) to remotely monitor and control the USV
- an optional Central Monitoring Station (CMS) to monitor a fleet of up 15 USV units.

Currently, 25 systems are already in operation.

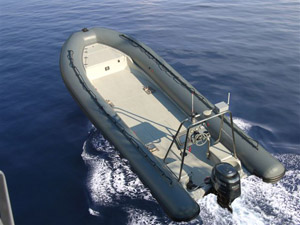
UAPS20 USV

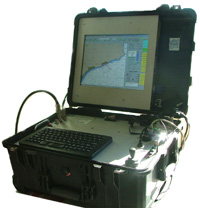
Operator Control Station

== Features ==
The UAPS20 is a brand of a multi-mission unmanned surface vehicles. The platform is capable of carrying up to 2100 kg of payload for different tasks, among those:

- Remote surveillance using sonar, radar, and camera.
- Remote mine hunting and countermeasures.
- Protection of harbours.
- Naval targets.
- Remotely operated underwater vehicle (ROUV or ROV) autonomous underwater vehicle (AUV) remote launch/control platform.

The autopilot system allows full autonomous modes or remote control mode from the OCS station.

== General specifications ==
- Length: 7.5 m (25 ft)
- Weight: 1250 kg (without payload)
- Engine: 150 Hp 4 stroke outboard
- Payload: up to 2100 kg
- Speed: 40 knots (74 km/h)

== Similar USV ==
- Protector USV
- Spartan Scout

== Sources ==
- SIEL page on UAPS20
