= Type 80 demolition boat =

Chinese obstacle clearance boat

History

PRC
- Yard number: No 425
- Status: Being retired

Class overview
- Operators: People's Liberation Army Navy

General characteristics
- Type: Demolition boat
- Displacement: 8.5 long tons (8.6 t)
- Length: 20.15 m (66 ft 1 in)
- Beam: 2.08 m (6 ft 10 in)
- Depth: 1.258 m (4 ft 1.5 in)
- Propulsion: Marine Diesel @ 90 bhp (67 kW)
- Speed: 19 kn (35 km/h; 22 mph)
- Complement: Unmmaned
- Sensors & processing systems: None
- Electronic warfare & decoys: None
- Armour: None
- Aircraft carried: None
- Aviation facilities: None

Type 80 demolition boat is a type of little known obstacle clearance boat built in the People’s Republic of China (PRC) for the People's Liberation Army Navy (PLAN). The origin of Type 80 demolition boat is rooted back in the early 1960s when Factory No. 425 (Plant 425), the predecessor of Wuhu Shipyard first developed a wooden demolition boat designated as Type 308 for PLAN. Type 308 demolition boat was intended to be used in the first wave of amphibious landing operations to clear out obstacles on the beach for landing forces. Production of Type 308 demolition boat begun in January 1960, and the first unit was launched in June that year. Due to the political turmoil in China at the time, namely, Great Leap Forward, the boat was turned over to PLAN on July 11, 1960, long before sea trials had been conducted, which was not completed until two years later in 1962. Specification of Type 308 demolition boat:

- Displacement (t): 8.5
- Length (m): 20.15
- Beam (m): 2.08
- Depth (m): 1.258
- Speed (kt): 19
- Propulsion: 1 Liberation diesel engine @ 90 hp

Type 308 did not enter Chinese service in large numbers, because PLAN was not satisfied with the fact it must be manned, although Type 308 demolition boat never entered mass production, it did set the standards for later models, such as the general dimensions and performance of demolition boats built afterward. Requiring an operator onboard until the very last minute before finally ditching the boat is a serious shortcoming of Type 308 design, because it meant that the operator must be exposd enemy fire. Therefore, in 1964, the original design was updated to incorporate a remote control system, which was approved in December that year. Series production followed, and the updated version was named as Type 64 demolition boat, but again, due to political turmoil in China at the time, this time is the Cultural Revolution, series production did not begun two years after Cultural Revolution had ended, and the production run lasted from 1978 through 1980. A follow-on design appeared before the production run of Type 64 demolish boat ended, and it was designated as Type 308II, which replaced the hull of Type 64 with a fiberglass hull. Early in the production run, the wooden framed, fiberglass hulled Type 308II was soon superseded by an upgrade made entirely of fiberglass, and subsequently designated as Type 80 remotely operated demolition boat, or Type 80 demolition boat for short. Production run of Type 80 lasted from 1980 through 1984, and it's believed they are currently being retired from front line service, being replaced by unmanned surface vehicles in PLAN.
