= Katran =

Katran may refer to:

- Katran, a Russian military helicopter based on the Kamov Ka-50
- Katran (naval drone family), developed in Ukraine

== See also ==
- Katrang, a village in Kyrgyzstan
