= USV RSV =

RSV (Remote Survey Vehicle)
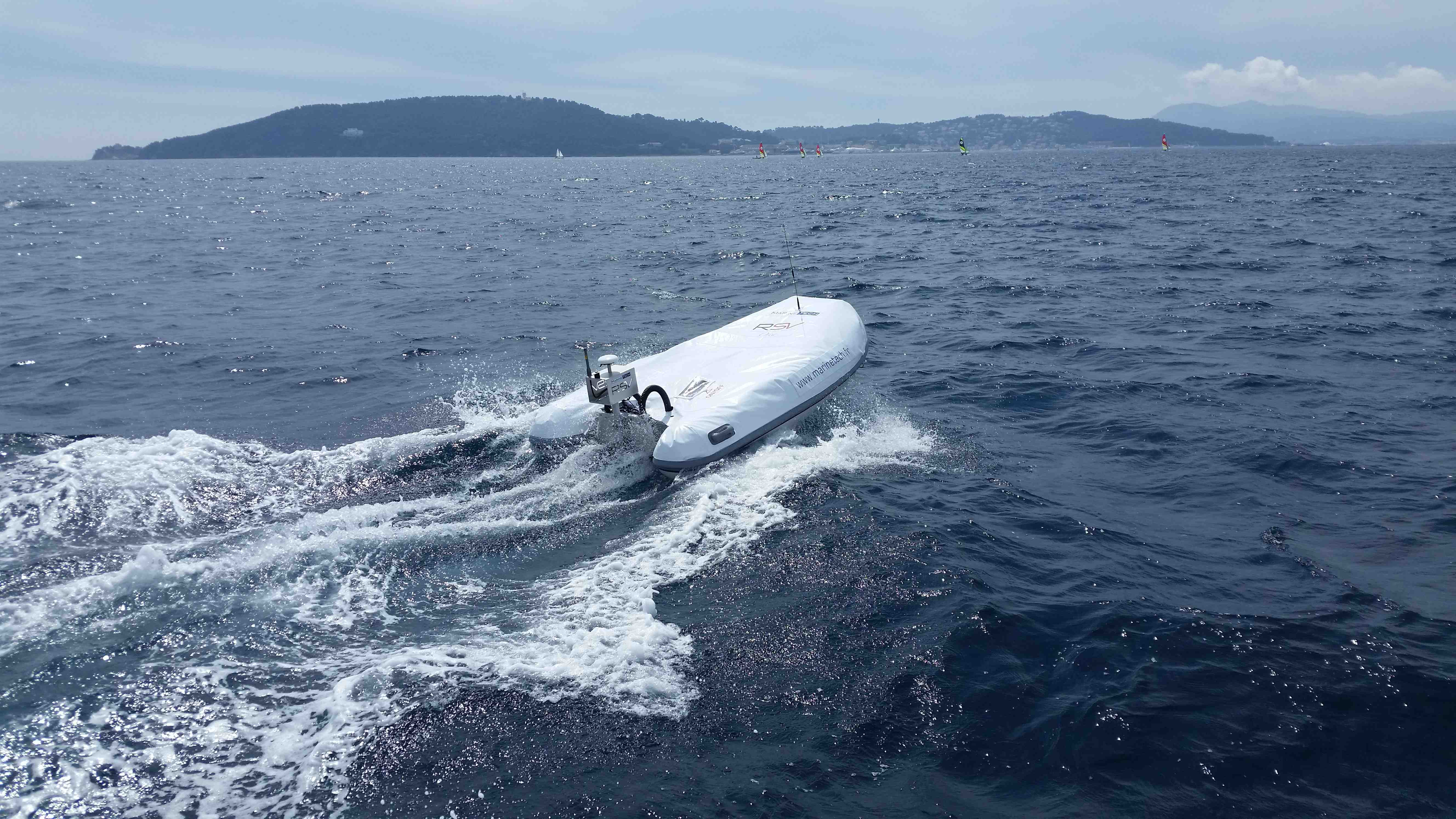
- RSV Orca in transit to a survey area, France, April 2016

Class overview
- Builders: Marine Tech SAS
- In service: 2008–present

General characteristics
- Type: Inflatable - Semi-rigid platform
- Length: 2 to 4.2 m
- Beam: 1.2 to 2.1 m
- Draft: 0.4-0.5 m
- Propulsion: 2 electric engines
- Speed: up to 12 kt
- Capacity: 25 to 200 kg payload
- Complement: Remote or autopilot, air-transportable
- Sensors & processing systems: DGPS-RTK MBES, Lidar, Sub-bottom profiler, Side Scan sonar, Motion sensor, HD video, ROV

The RSV (Remote Survey Vehicle) is an unmanned surface vehicle developed by the founders of Marine Tech SAS since 2008.

== Features ==
Engineered and designed as an autonomous and robust marine surface platform, the RSV can operate several oceanographic sensors simultaneously to achieve measurements, exploration of aquatic environment and hydrographic survey.

Fitted with a high resolution infrared camera, the RSV can also be considered as an autonomous platform for surveillance and security of sensitive areas (ports protection, specific areas monitoring or observation of unsafe events for humans).

With an autonomy varying from 4h to 48h, the RSV is a size-optimized and user-friendly USV, remotely controlled or autopiloted. Data measured are transmitted and visualized/controlled in real time by the distant operator.

The range of RSV allows operating:

- in difficult access areas (dams, rivers, shallow water, canals, etc.),
- offshore.

The RSV allows ROV deployment for subsea observation and monitoring.

RSV are manufactured and produced in France by Marine Tech SAS.
