= Roboat =

Research program on autonomous boats in Amsterdam, the Netherlands

Roboat is a research program on autonomous boats in Amsterdam. The program was scheduled to last from 2016-2021, is developing the world's first fleet of autonomous vessels. It focuses on moving people and goods, portable infrastructure and data gathering. Roboat is a project of the Amsterdam Institute for Advanced Metropolitan Solutions (AMS Institute). The research within the program is conducted by MIT, Delft University of Technology and Wageningen University and Research. The program has a budget of €25 million. Prototypes are tested in Amsterdam's canals.

== History ==
On 5 October 2018 a shuttle was tested, using 6-person autonomous boats following a circular route linking Oosterdokskade with the NEMO science centre, a crossing where building a fixed bridge is impossible as it is a through route for high-masted ships.

In 2019, the vessels learned how to dock together and organizing to support specific tasks.

In 2020, the first passenger-capable configuration was completed. Roboat III is 4 metres (13 ft) long and can carry and adapt to up to 5 passengers.

Two full-scale units had been deployed by October 2021, becoming the world's first urban autonomous vessels.
