= Katran (naval drone family) =

Unmanned surface vehicle

Katran is a family of naval unmanned surface vehicles (USV) developed in Ukraine by the defense company MAC HUB. The system is intended for a range of maritime military applications. The drones come in the following models: Katran X1, Katran X1.2, Katran X2, Katran X3, and KATRAN VENOM.

Katran Naval Drone Х3

Each variant is designed to perform specific roles. These may include direct strike missions against naval targets or port infrastructure, as well as surveillance, reconnaissance, patrol, search and rescue operations, mine countermeasures, and the protection of maritime assets.

However, the Katran drones are primarily noted for their versatility and their ability to complement one another during complex, multi-layered operations. In such scenarios, they are intended to operate not as individual naval drones, but as an integrated system.

== History ==
According to publicly available sources, the development of the Ukrainian unmanned surface vessels involved the same naval designer who had previously participated in the design of the russian cruiser Moskva.

The first public reports regarding the use of Katran drones in combat appeared on 10 October 2025. On that date, the Main Directorate of Intelligence of the Ministry of Defence of Ukraine released information about a special operation known as the “Boyko Towers” operation. Control over the offshore platforms involved was described as having strategic significance during the Russo-Ukrainian War.

Representatives of the Ukrainian authorities have stated that detailed information regarding operations involving these drones remains limited in publicly available sources.

== Combat use ==
On the night of 21 September 2025, Katran naval drones were reportedly involved in an attack on the so-called “Boyko Towers.” According to published accounts, the unmanned surface vessels were equipped with FPV drones and fixed-wing aerial drones.

In addition, each Katran platform was reported to carry supplementary unmanned systems, including underwater loitering munitions mounted beneath the hull. These systems were described in media reports as long-range autonomous underwater weapons.

Following the completion of the mission, the drones were reported to have returned to base. Details of the operation were published by The Times. Public information regarding whether Katran X2 units or the KATRAN VENOM combat platform participated in the operation, and what specific roles they may have performed, has not been disclosed.

In 2026, Ukrainian Defense Forces reportedly began using Katran naval drones not only to strike enemy targets but also to defend Ukrainian cities against Shahed-type UAVs. According to the German newspaper Welt, Russian drones often fly along rivers to avoid Ukrainian air defenses. Welt suggested that naval drones could help cover this gap. A Katran X1.2 can deploy 27 MAC Dead Fly interceptor drones.

MAC HUB is also preparing the Katran family for a new type of mission: intercepting and seizing commercial vessels of the “shadow fleet” carrying sanctioned goods through the Black Sea. The vessels would be warned of their seizure and, following the arrest, escorted to port by Katran naval drones. The drones can simultaneously monitor the vessel, activity on its deck, the airspace above it, and the surrounding waters.
