= Spartan Scout =

U.S. unmanned surface vehicle demo

History
- Launched: c.2002

General characteristics
- Type: Rigid hull inflatable boat
- Tonnage: 2 tons
- Length: 7 m (23 ft)
- Capacity: 3,000 lb (1,400 kg) payload
- Sensors & processing systems: Various electro-optical, infrared; Surface search radar
- Armament: .50 caliber machine gun

Spartan Scout, an Advanced Concept Technology Demonstration, is a crewless surface watercraft, also known as an unmanned surface vehicle (USV), developed by the United States in 2001, and first demonstrated in late 2003. The craft, a rigid hull inflatable boat, weighs 2 tons, and is 7 metres (23 ft) in length. It is equipped with a .50 caliber machine gun, as well as various sensors, such as electro-optical and infrared surveillance and surface search radar. The Spartan is capable of carrying a 3,000-pound (1,400 kg) payload. According to a press release from the United States Navy, the Spartan Scout will also come in a 11-metre (36 ft) version, capable of carrying a 5,000-pound (2,300 kg) payload.

Although a two-man boat crew is needed to deploy the Spartan Scout, once deployed, it is capable of working autonomously or semi-autonomously. During its demonstration deployment, the Spartan Scout was configured for surface surveillance and force protection, although it can potentially be configured for more complex missions.

== Sources ==
Bosworth, Michael L. (2006). "Crewless surface watercraft". Yearbook of Science and Technology 2006. McGraw-Hill.
