= Autonomous logistics =

Unmanned, autonomous systems

Autonomous logistics describes systems that provide unmanned, autonomous transfer of equipment, baggage, people, information or resources from point-to-point with minimal human intervention. Autonomous logistics is a new area being researched and currently there are few papers on the topic, with even fewer systems developed or deployed. With web enabled cloud software there are companies focused on developing and deploying such systems which will begin coming online in 2018.

== Autonomous logistics vehicles ==
There are several subclasses of autonomous logistics vehicles:

Ground autonomous logistics
Based on Unmanned ground vehicle technology, a large autonomous logistics tracked carrier, which can be deployed in a tropical forest for day and night, has been developed.

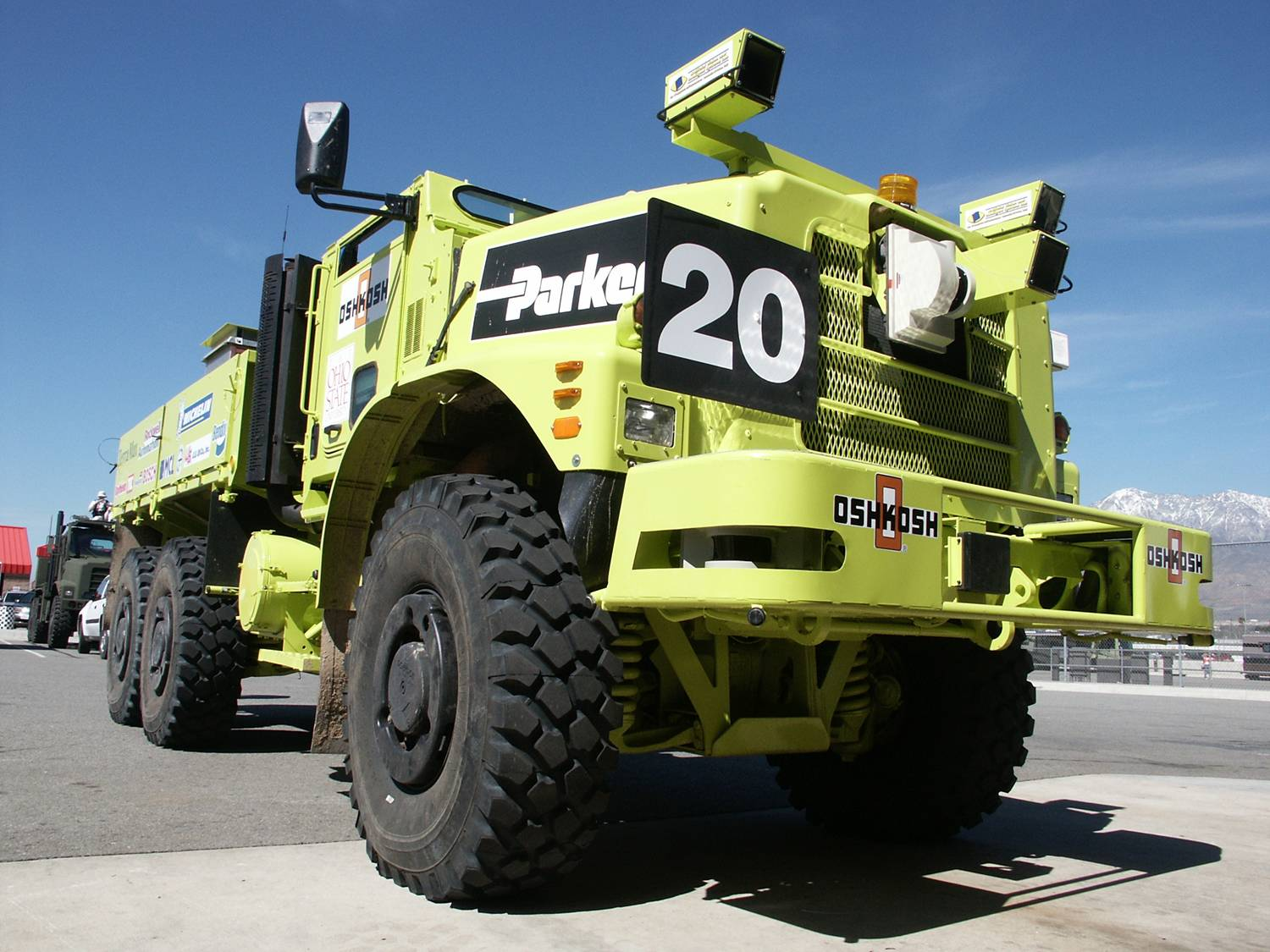
Oshkosh Corporation's MTVR-based TerraMax just before the 2004 DARPA Grand Challenge

Another example is the TerraMax autonomous truck based on Oshkosh's Medium Tactical Vehicle Replacement (MTVR) military truck platform. Most recently, TerraMax competed in the 2007 Darpa Urban Challenge. The MTVR was designed for the U.S. Marine Corps with a 70% off-road mission profile. TerraMax's unmanned ground vehicle kit does not interfere with the conventional operation of the vehicle. A robust sensor suite allows for 360-degree situational awareness around TerraMax. Elements of the autonomous navigation kit could be used to enhance driver awareness. The complete kit could be used in applications such as snow removal on airport runways.

Aerial autonomous logistics
Based on unmanned aerial vehicle technology, aerial autonomous logistics (or logistics UAVs) provides transfer of resources and equipment in disaster relief situations, replenishment operations, reconnaissance operations where information is gathered, and general parcel or package delivery.

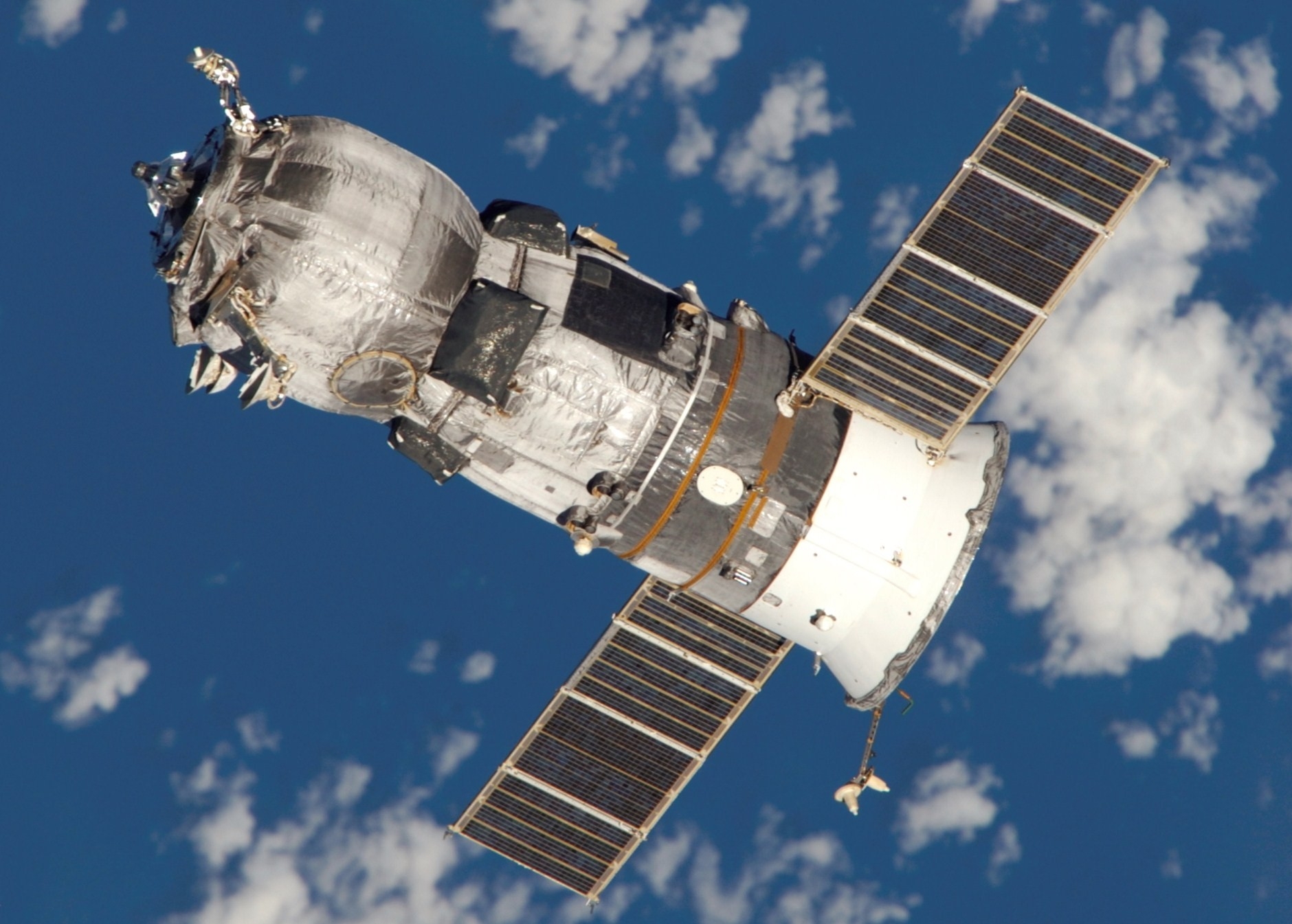
Progress cargo spacecraft

Space autonomous logistics
Describes the ability to provide logistics to and from space, be that orbital, lunar or beyond. Current space logistics vehicle examples are the Progress spacecraft, Russian expendable freighter uncrewed resupply spacecraft and the Automated Transfer Vehicle, expendable uncrewed resupply spacecraft developed by the European Space Agency.

Above Water autonomous logistics
Based on unmanned surface vehicle technology, this class of vehicles provides a range of surface fleet replenishment and equipment transfer capabilities.

Subsea autonomous logistics
Using autonomous underwater vehicle technology, these vehicles provide re-supply to underwater facilities, reconnaissance of underwater structures, emergency recovery capability, and so on.

== Agent-based logistics ==
Shipping containers handle most of today's intercontinental transport of packaged goods. Managing them in terms of planning and scheduling is a challenging task due to the complexity and dynamics of the involved processes. Hence, recent developments show an increasing trend towards autonomous control with software agents acting on behalf of the logistic objects. Despite the high degree of autonomy it is still necessary to cooperate in order to achieve certain goals.

The current trends and recent changes in logistics lead to new, complex and partially conflicting requirements for logistic planning and control systems. Due to the distributed nature of logistics, the usage of agent technology is promising. Due to the mobile nature of logistics, the usage of mobile agent technology is promising as well. Scenarios of usage of mobile agents in logistics has been envisioned.

== See also ==
- Agent-based model
- Automated Transfer Vehicle
- Autonomic system (computing)
- Autonomous Underwater Vehicle
- Multi-agent planning
- Multi-agent system
- Network-centric warfare
- Unmanned aerial vehicle
- Unmanned ground vehicle
- Unmanned surface vehicle
- Self-driving truck
- Automated guided vehicle
