= Unmanned surface vehicle =

Vehicle that operates on the surface of the water without a crew

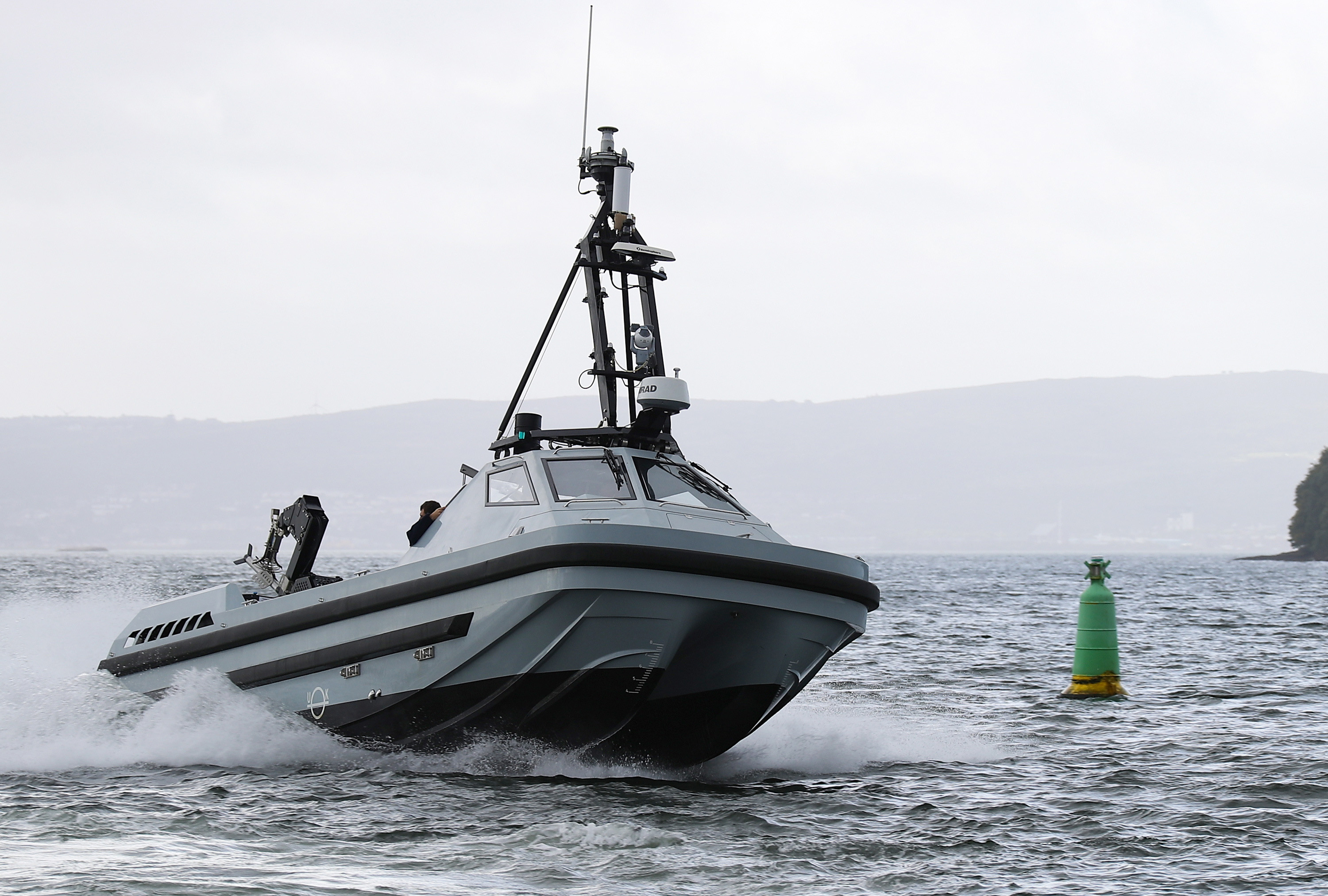
British RNMB Harrier, an autonomous USV of the Atlas Elektronik ARCIMS mine warfare system (2020)

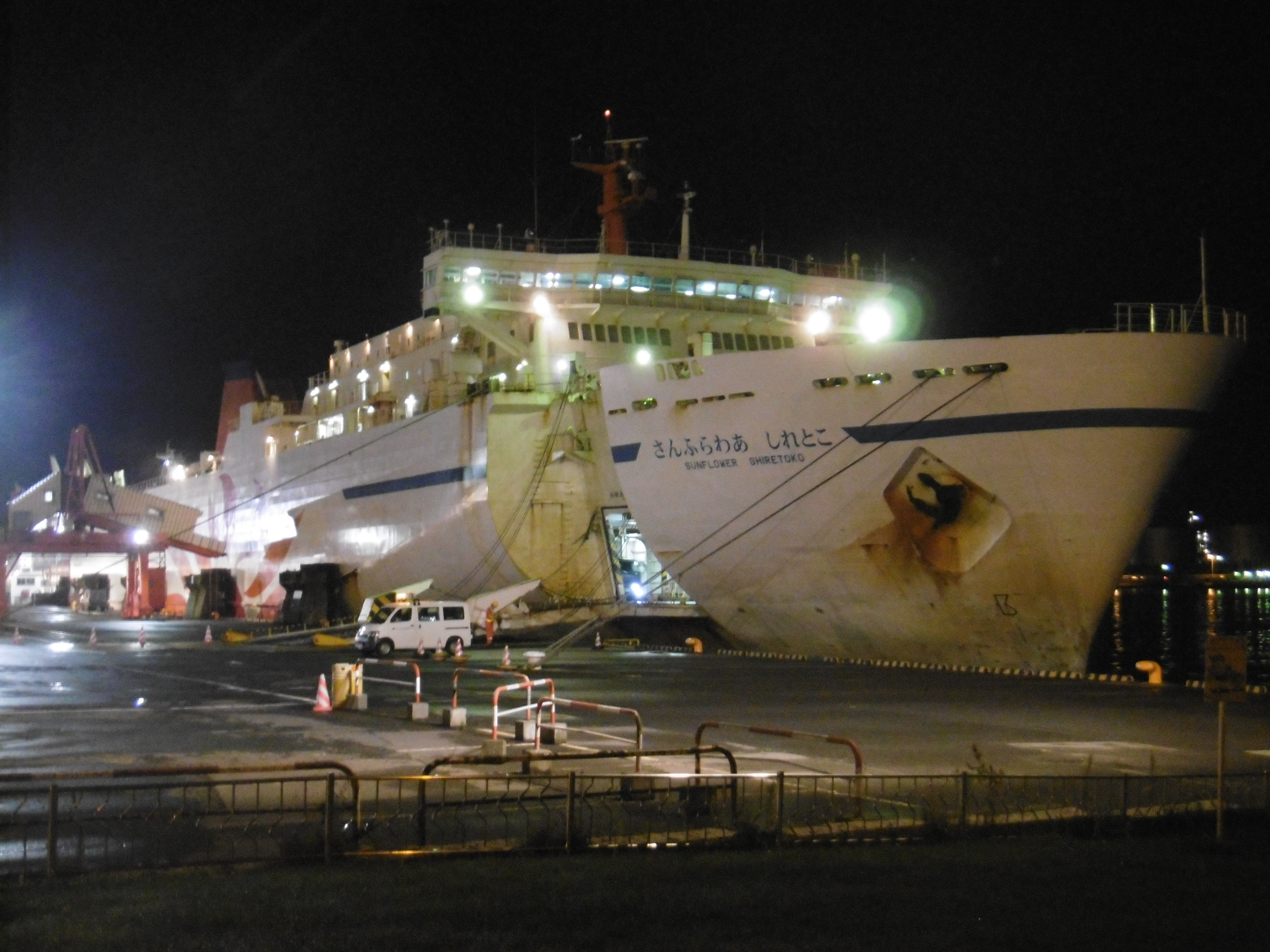
In February 2022, the Japanese passenger ferry Sunflower Shiretoko sailed autonomously for 750 kilometers.

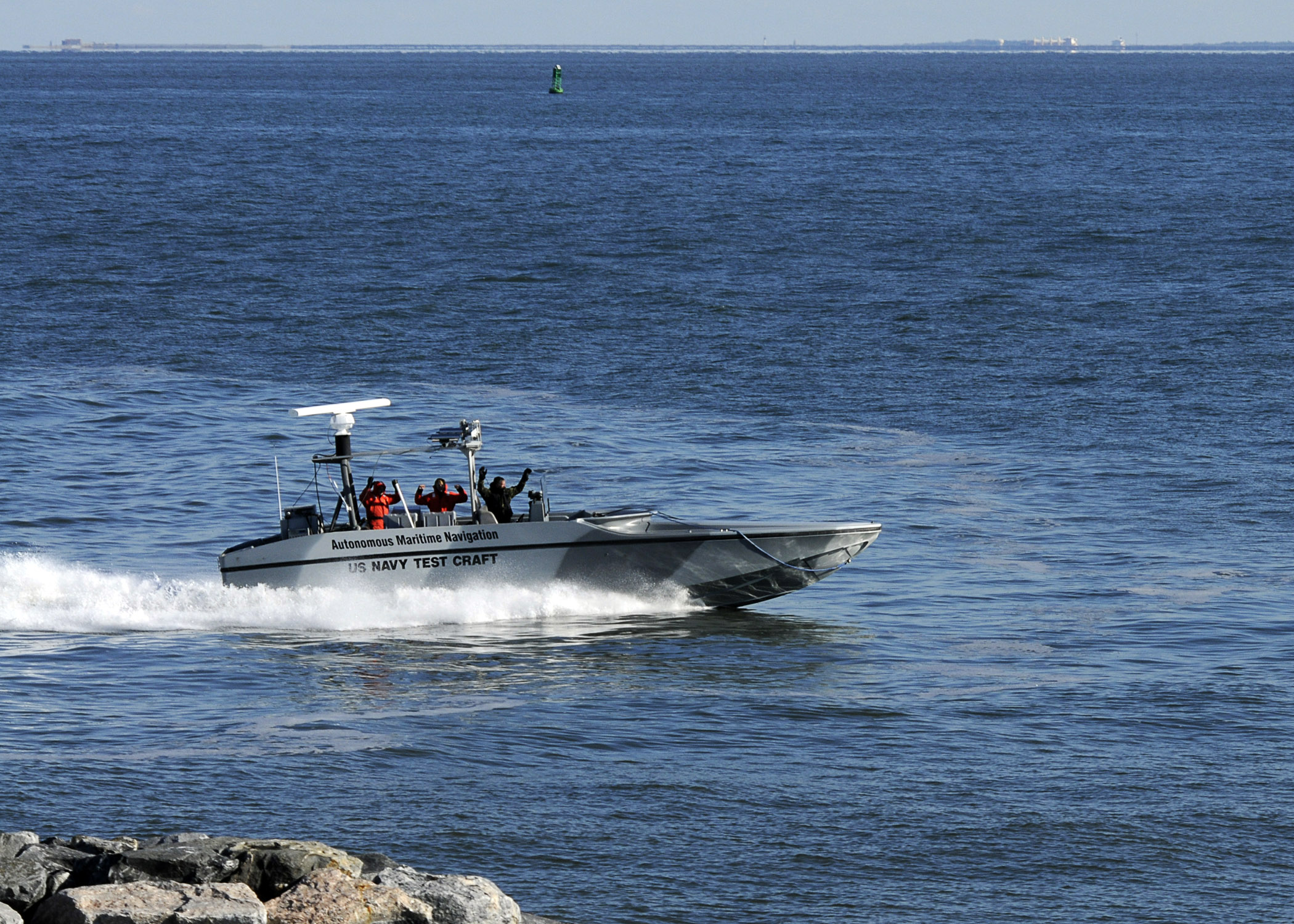
A passenger USV demonstration at Hampton, Virginia, United States (January 2009)

An unmanned surface vehicle, unmanned surface vessel or uncrewed surface vessel (USV), colloquially called a drone boat, drone ship or sea drone, is a boat or ship that operates on the surface of the water without a crew. USVs operate with various levels of autonomy, from remote control to fully autonomous surface vehicles (ASV).

== Regulatory environment ==
The regulatory environment for USV operations is changing rapidly as the technology develops and is more frequently deployed on commercial projects. The Maritime Autonomous Surface Ship UK Industry Conduct Principles and Code of Practice 2020 (V4) has been prepared by the UK Maritime Autonomous Systems Regulatory Working Group (MASRWG) and published by Maritime UK through the Society of Maritime Industries. Organisations that contributed to the development of the MASS Code of Practice include The Maritime & Coastguard Agency (MCA), Atlas Elektronik UK Ltd, AutoNaut, Fugro, the UK Chamber of Shipping, UKHO, Trinity House, Nautical Institute, National Oceanography Centre, Dynautics Limited, SEA-KIT International, Sagar Defence Engineering and many more.

== Development ==
As early as in World War I Germany designed and used remote-controlled FL-boats to attack British warships. At the end of World War II, remote-controlled USVs were used by the US Navy for target drone and minesweeping applications. In the twenty-first century, advances in USV control systems and navigation technologies have resulted in USVs that an operator can control remotely from land or a nearby vessel: USVs that operate with partially autonomous control, and USVs (ASVs) that operate fully autonomously. Modern applications and research areas for USVs and ASVs include commercial shipping, environmental and climate monitoring, seafloor mapping, passenger ferries, robotic research, surveillance, inspection of bridges and other infrastructure, military, and naval operations.

On January 17, 2022, the Soleil succeeded in completing the first fully autonomous sea voyage by ship. Built by MHI, the demonstration was conducted in cooperation of Shin Nihonkai Ferry. The seven-hour, 240-kilometre voyage, from Shinmoji in Northern Kyushu to the Iyonada Sea, recorded a maximum speed of 26 knots.

In August 2022, the MV Mikage of the Mitsui O.S.K. Lines sailed 161-nautical miles over two days, from Tsuruga to Sakai, successfully completing the first crewless sea voyage to include docking of an autonomous coastal container ship, in a two-day trial.

=== USV autonomy platforms ===
A number of autonomy platforms (computer software) tailored specifically for USV operations have been developed. Some are tied to specific vessels, while others are flexible and can be applied to different hull, mechanical, and electrical configurations.

USV autonomy platforms
Name	Vendor	Type	Deployed vessels	Vendor bespoke USVs	Conversion to USV / OEM	COLREGs
Typhoon	Satfinder	Commercial	2	Yes	Yes	Capable
ASView	L3Harris	Commercial	100+	Yes	Yes	Capable
Sense	MAHI	Commercial		No	Yes	Capable
MOOS	MIT	Open source		No	Yes (open source)	Capable
SM300	Sea Machines	Commercial	7	No	Yes	Capable
SDE	Sagar Defence Engineering Private Limited	Commercial	7	Yes	Yes	Capable
Voyager	Robosys Automation	Commercial	24	Yes	Yes	Capable

== Computer-controlled and operated USVs ==
The design and build of uncrewed surface vessels (USVs) is complex and challenging. Hundreds of decisions relating to mission goals, payload requirements, power budget, hull design, communication systems and propulsion control and management need to be analysed and implemented. Crewed vessel builders often rely on single-source suppliers for propulsion and instrumentation to help the crew control the vessel. In the case of an uncrewed (or partially crewed) vessel, the builder needs to replace elements of the human interface with a remote human interface.

=== Technical considerations ===
Uncrewed surface vessels vary in size from under 1 metre LOA to 20+ metres, with displacements ranging from a few kilograms to many tonnes, so propulsion systems cover a wide range of power levels, interfaces and technologies.

Interface types (broadly) in order of size/power:

- PWM-controlled Electronic Speed Controllers for simple electric motors
- Serial bus, using ASCII-coded commands
- Serial bus using binary protocols
- Analogue interfaces found on many larger vessel
- Proprietary CANbus protocols used by various engine manufacturers
- Proprietary CANbus protocols used by manufacturers of generic engine controls

While many of these protocols carry demands to the propulsion, most of them do not bring back any status information. Feedback of achieved RPM may come from tacho pulses or from built-in sensors that generate CAN or serial data. Other sensors may be fitted, such as current sensing on electric motors, which can give an indication of power delivered. Safety is a critical concern, especially at high power levels, but even a small propeller can cause damage or injury and the control system needs to be designed with this in mind. This is particularly important in handover protocols for optionally manned boats.

A frequent challenge faced in the control of USVs is the achievement of a smooth response from full astern to full ahead. Crewed vessels usually have a detent behaviour, with a wide deadband around the stop position. To achieve accurate control of differential steering, the control system needs to compensate for this deadband. Internal combustion engines tend to drive through a gearbox, with an inevitable sudden change when the gearbox engages which the control system must take into account. Waterjets are the exception to this, as they adjust smoothly through the zero point. Electric drives often have a similar deadband built in, so again the control system needs to be designed to preserve this behaviour for a man on board, but smooth it out for automatic control, e.g., for low-speed manoeuvring and Dynamic Positioning.

== Oceanography, hydrography and environmental monitoring ==
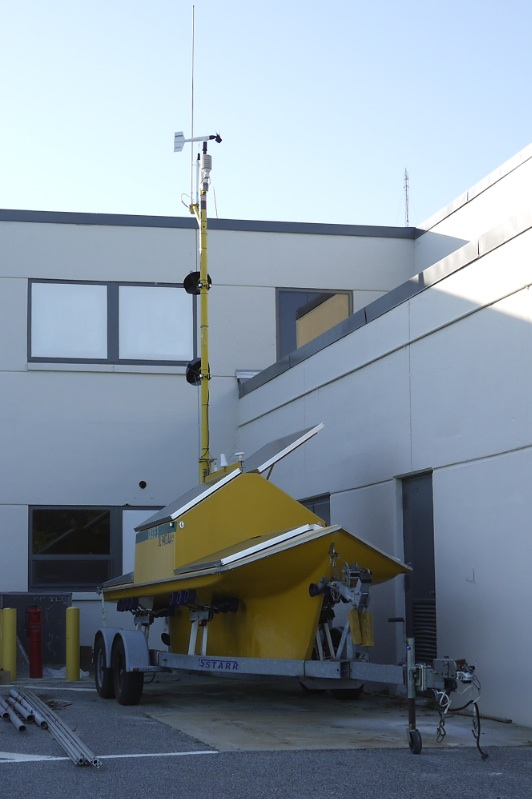
USV used in oceanographic research (June 2011)

USVs are valuable in oceanography, as they are more maneuverable than moored or drifting weather buoys, but far cheaper than the equivalent weather ships and research vessels, and more flexible than commercial-ship contributions. USVs used in oceanographic research tend to be powered and propelled by renewable energy sources. For example, Wave gliders harness wave energy for primary propulsion, whereas Saildrones use wind. Other USVs harness solar energy to power electric motors. Renewable-powered and persistent, ocean-going USVs have solar cells to power their electronics. Renewable-powered USV persistence are typically measured in months.

As late as early 2022, USVs had been predominantly used for environmental monitoring and hydrographic survey and future uptake was projected to be likely to grow in monitoring and surveillance of very remote locations due to their potential for multidisciplinary use. Low operational cost has been a consistent driver for USV uptake when compared with crewed vessels. Other drivers for USV uptake have changed through time, including reducing risk to people, spatio-temporal efficiency, endurance, precision and accessing very shallow water.

Non-renewable-powered USVs are a powerful tool for use in commercial hydrographic survey. Using a small USV in parallel to traditional survey vessels as a 'force-multiplier' can double survey coverage and reduce time on-site. This method was used for a survey carried out in the Bering Sea, off Alaska; the ASV Global 'C-Worker 5' autonomous surface vehicle (ASV) collected 2,275 nautical miles of survey, 44% of the project total. This was a first for the survey industry and resulted in a saving of 25 days at sea. In 2020, the British USV Maxlimer completed an uncrewed survey of 1,000 square kilometres (390 sq mi) of seafloor in the Atlantic Ocean west of the English Channel.

=== Environmental Research Vehicles ===
==== Saildrone ====
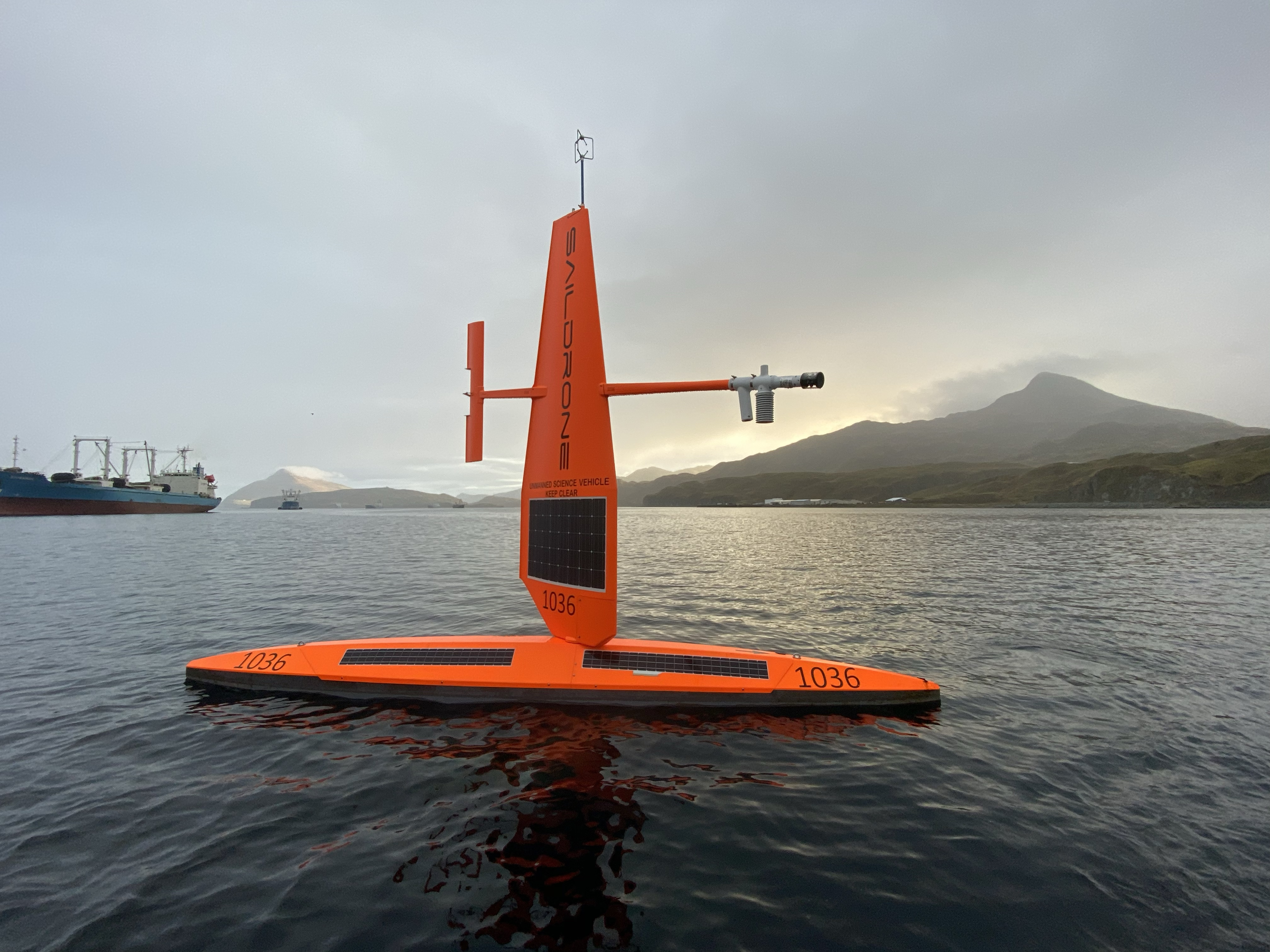
A saildrone in Dutch Harbor, Alaska, after the 2019 NOAA Arctic missions

A saildrone is a type of uncrewed surface vehicle used primarily in oceans for data collection. Saildrones are wind and solar powered and carry a suite of science sensors and navigational instruments. They can follow a set of remotely prescribed waypoints. The saildrone was invented by Richard Jenkins, a British engineer, founder and CEO of Saildrone, Inc. Saildrones have been used by scientists and research organizations like the National Oceanic and Atmospheric Administration (NOAA) to survey the marine ecosystem, fisheries, and weather. In January 2019, a small fleet of saildrones was launched to attempt the first autonomous circumnavigation of Antarctica. One of the saildrones completed the mission, traveling 12,500 miles (20,100 km) over the seven month journey while collecting a detailed data set using onboard environmental monitoring instrumentation.

In August 2019, SD 1021 completed the fastest uncrewed Atlantic crossing sailing from Bermuda to the UK, and in October, it completed the return trip to become the first autonomous vehicle to cross the Atlantic in both directions. The University of Washington and the Saildrone company began a joint venture in 2019 called The Saildrone Pacific Sentinel Experiment, which positioned six saildrones along the west coast of the United States to gather atmospheric and ocean data.

Saildrone and NOAA deployed five modified hurricane-class vessels at key locations in the Atlantic Ocean prior to the June start of the 2021 hurricane season. In September, SD 1045 was in location to obtain video and data from inside Hurricane Sam. It was the first research vessel to ever venture into the middle of a major hurricane.

In June 2025 the Danish ministry of defence deployed four Saildrones in the Baltic Sea to monitor Russia's "shadow fleet" of embargo-breaking oil tankers, and potential threats from that state to underwater infrastructure.

==== Low-cost developments ====
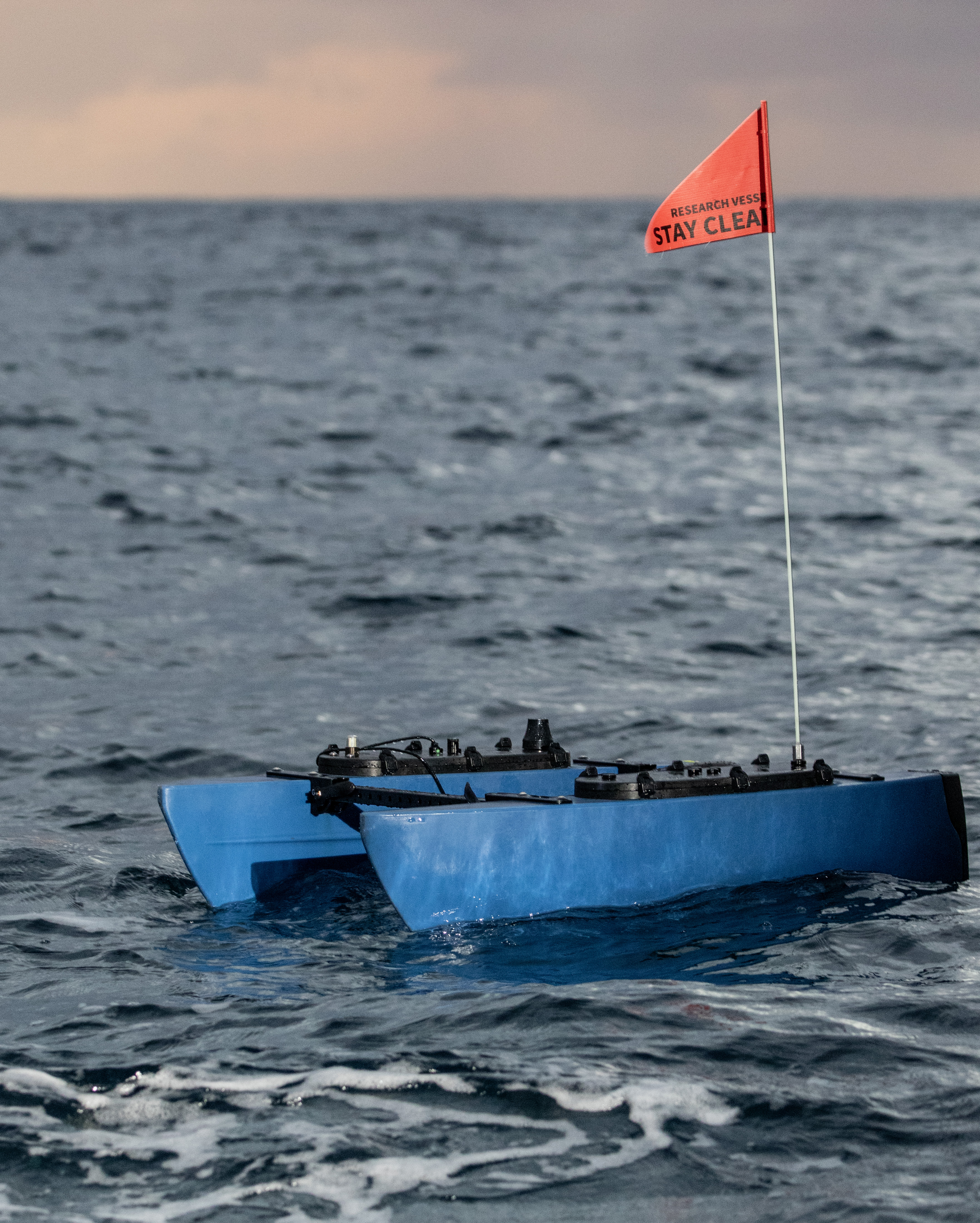
A low-cost USV platform

Technologists are motivated to understand our waters due to rising concerns of water pollution as a global challenge. The availability of off-the-shelf sensors and instruments have spurred increased developments of low-cost vehicles. New regulations and monitoring requirements have created a need for scalable technologies such as robots for water quality sampling and microplastics collection.

== Military applications ==
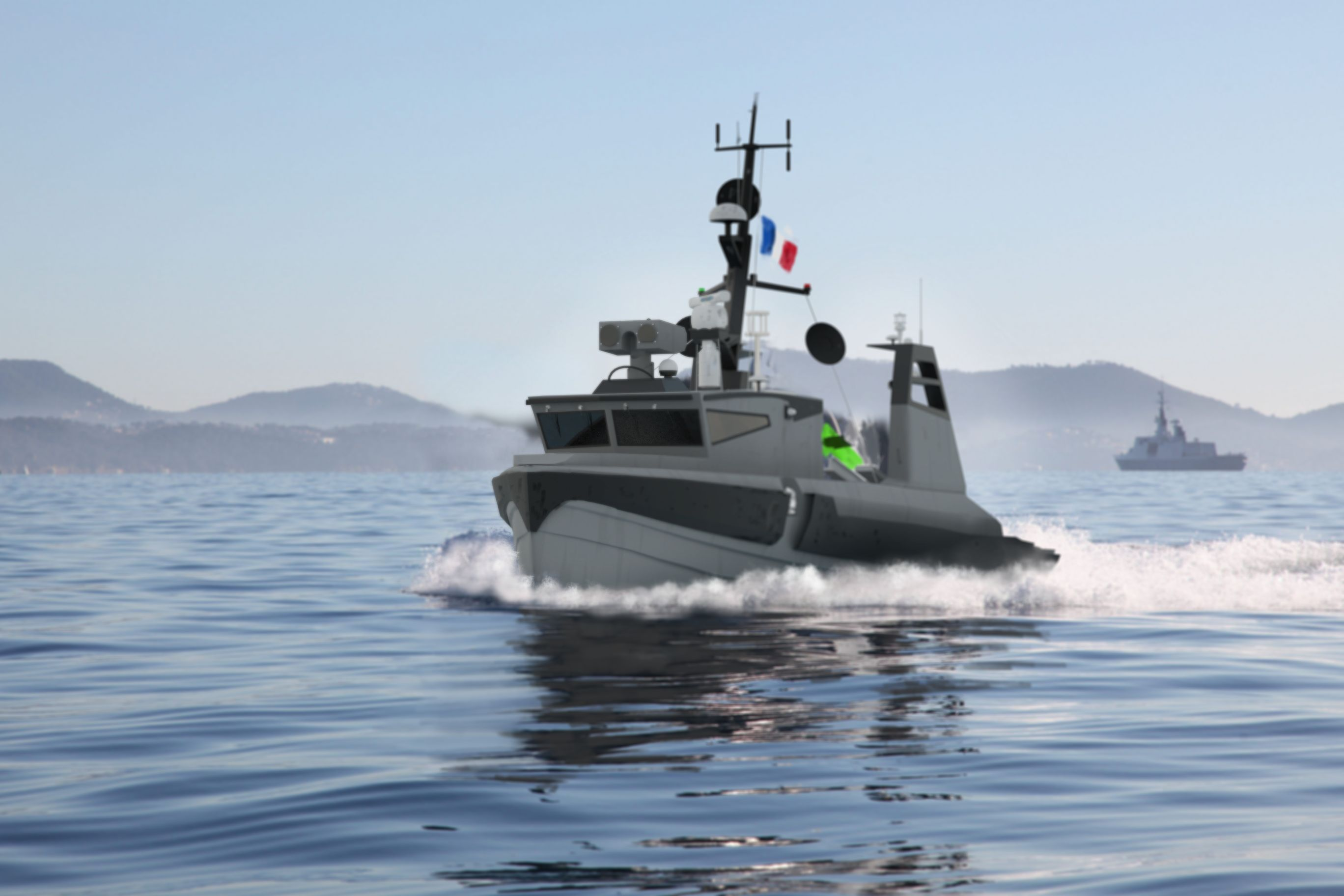
Computer-generated image of a Franco-British MMCM (Maritime Mine Counter Measures) minesweeping drone

The military usage of uncrewed ships in the form of a fire ship dates back to ancient times.

USVs were used militarily as early as the 1920s as remote controlled target craft, following the development of the DCBs in World War One. By World War II they were also being used for minesweeper purposes.

Military applications for USVs include powered seaborne targets and minehunting, as well as surveillance and reconnaissance, strike operations, and area denial or sea denial. Various other applications are also being explored. Some commercial USVs may utilize COLREGs-compliant navigation.

In 2016 DARPA launched an anti-submarine USV prototype called Sea Hunter. Turkish firm Aselsan produced ALBATROS-T and ALBATROS-K moving target boats for the Turkish Naval Forces to use in shooting drills. Turkey's first indigenously developed armed USV (AUSV) is the ULAQ, developed by Ares Shipyard, Meteksan Defence Systems and Roketsan. ULAQ is armed with 4 Roketsan Cirit and 2 UMTAS. It completed its first firing test successfully on 27 May 2021. The ULAQ can be deployed from combat ships. It can be controlled remotely from mobile vehicles, headquarters, command centers and floating platforms. It will serve in missions such as reconnaissance, surveillance and intelligence, surface warfare, asymmetric warfare, armed escort, force protection, and strategic facility security. Ares Shipyard's CEO says that very different versions of ULAQ equipped with different weapons are under development. Its primary user will be Turkish Naval Forces.

In addition, military applications for medium uncrewed surface vessels (MUSVs) include fleet intelligence, surveillance, reconnaissance and electronic warfare. In August 2020, L3Harris Technologies was awarded a contract to build an MUSV prototype, with options for up to nine vessels. L3Harris subcontracted Swiftships, a Louisiana-based shipbuilder, to build the vessels, with displacement of about 500 tons. The prototype is targeted for completion by end of 2022. It is the first uncrewed naval platform programme in this class of ships, which will likely play a major role in supporting the Distributed Maritime Operations strategy of the U.S. Navy. Earlier, Swiftships partnered with University of Louisiana in 2014 to build the Anaconda (AN-1) and later the Anaconda (AN-2) class of small USVs.

On 13 April 2022, the US sent unspecified "uncrewed coastal defense vessels" to Ukraine amid the Russo-Ukrainian war as part of a new security package.

In 2023, the U.S. Navy began fielding the Global Autonomous Reconnaissance Craft (GARC), a 16-foot unmanned surface vessel developed by Maritime Applied Physics Corporation. Designed for scalable production and modular payload integration, GARC supports missions such as reconnaissance, surveillance, interdiction, and force protection. The Navy aims to ramp up production to 32 units per month, with over $160 million obligated for the program. GARCs are operated by Unmanned Surface Vessel Squadrons 3 and 7 (USVRON-3 and USVRON-7), and have been deployed in multiple operational theaters.

A theory was put forward by the BBC that an uncrewed surface vehicle was used in the 2022 Crimean Bridge explosion. After explosions at this bridge in July 2023, Russia's Anti-Terrorist Committee claimed that Ukraine used uncrewed surface vehicles to attack the bridge.

In December 2023, Russia unveiled its first kamikaze USV called "Oduvanchik". It is reported that the sea drone can carry up to 600 kg of explosives, has a range of 200 km and speed of 80 km/h.

At a ceremony held on 9 January 2024, TCB Marlin entered service in the Turkish Naval Forces as the first armed USV, with the hull number TCB-1101 and name Marlin SİDA.

Matangi ASV on autonomous transit

In 2024, Sagar Defence Engineering Pvt Ltd demonstrated 850 nautical mile autonomous transit of, Matangi Autonomous Surface Vessel to the Indian Navy. The autonomous transit began from Mumbai and ended at Toothukudi. This demonstration was part of Indian Navy's Swavalamban 2024 self reliance in technology contest to enable the development of autonomous vessels for various military applications. These boats are equipped with 12.7 mm SRCG gun and is capable of day and night patrolling with speed above 50 knots. 12 such autonomous boats are to be acquired by the Indian Navy and will also be used to patrol Pangong Tso lake.

=== Possible first use in combat ===
During the Yemeni civil war on 30 January 2017 an Al Madinah-class frigate was attacked by Houthi forces. The frigate was hit at the stern, resulting in an explosion and a fire. The crew was able to extinguish the fire, but two crew members were killed, and three others were injured. Houthi forces claimed to have targeted the ship with a missile, but Saudi forces claim that the ship was hit by three "suicide boats".

=== Further use in combat ===
Main Directorate of Intelligence footage of MAGURA V5 USVs striking Russian patrol ship Sergey Kotov on 5 March 2024

On 29 October 2022, during the Russo-Ukrainian war, Ukrainian armed forces made a multi-USV attack on Russian naval vessels at the Sevastopol Naval Base. According to the Russian Defense Ministry, seven USVs were involved in the attack with support of eight UAVs. Naval News reported that little damage had occurred to either of the two warships that were hit by the small USVs, a Russian frigate and a minesweeper. However, the military effect of the attack on the protected harbor of Sevastopol exceeded the direct damage because it led to the Russian Navy going into a protective mode, "essentially locking them in port. ... New defenses were quickly added, new procedures imposed and there was much less activity. Russia's most powerful warships in the war [were by mid-November] mostly tied up in port." The US Naval Institute reported that, by December 2022, the "Russian Navy now knows it is vulnerable in its main naval base, causing it to retreat further into its shell, increasing defenses and reducing activity outside." A second USV attack occurred in mid-November in Novorossiysk, also in the Black Sea but much further from Russian occupied territory than Sevastopol.

By January 2023, SpaceX restricted the licensing of its Starlink satellite-internet communication technology to commercial use, excluding direct military use on weapon systems. The limitation restricted one use of the USV design used by Ukraine in late 2022. At the same time, Russia increased its capabilities in small explosive USVs which had been used to ram a Ukrainian bridge on 10 February 2023. By February, the new Russian capability with USVs, and the communication restrictions on the previous Ukrainian USVs, could affect the balance in the naval war. In the view of Naval News, "The Black Sea appears to be becoming more Russian friendly again." The potential for wider use of USVs to impact the outcome of the conflict is not settled, however, as both physical constraints on existing technology and emerging counter-USV capabilities may render these vessels vulnerable.

On 4 August 2023, the Olenegorsky Gornyak, a Ropucha-class landing ship was seriously damaged in the Black Sea Novorossiysk naval base after it was struck by a Ukrainian Maritime Drone carrying 450 kilograms of TNT. It was pictured listing heavily to one side while being towed back to port. Some 100 service personnel were on board at the time.

On 13 September 2023, an improved Kilo-class Russian submarine Rostov-na-Donu was "likely damaged beyond repair" by a combined missile and maritime drone attack, marking the first use of USVs against submarines, albeit the Russian submarine being in dry dock.

On 1 February 2024, the Tarantul-III class missile corvette Ivanovets was sunk in the Donuzlav Bay after being attacked by Ukrainian USVs.

On 14 February 2024, the Tsezar Kunikov, a Ropucha-class landing ship was sunk off Alupka by Ukrainian HUR MO Group 13 forces using MAGURA V5 USV.

On 2 May 2025, a Russian Su-30SM was shot down by an AIM-9 fired from a Ukrainian Magura V7 USV by Group 13 according to a HUR statement.

On 28 August 2025, the Ukrainian reconnaissance ship Simferopol was sunk in the delta of the Danube River by a Russian naval drone.

On 21 September 2025, Katran and Magura USVs successfully attacked the so-called “Boyko Towers”, offshore oil and gas platforms in the Black Sea under Russian control.

On 15 December 2025, another Improved Kilo-class submarine, the Russian submarine Kolpino, was hit by a Ukrainian Sea Baby USV while moored inside the submarine pen of the Novorossiysk Naval Base.

Uncrewed drone vessels were deployed by the US in the 2026 Iran war. A US Naval Forces Central Command Task Force 59 Sea Drone was used to rescue the two-person crew of a downed Boeing AH-64 Apache in the Strait of Hormuz.

On 12 September 2026, the Ukrainian Navy published footage showing a Ukrainian Sargan-3000 USV engaging a Russian improved Orcan-type USV, using a remote weapon station fitted with a heavy machine gun, and subsequently sinking the Russian USV. This was reported to be the first ever documented case of one USV engaging another USV.

==== Countermeasures used in combat ====
The naval war in the Black Sea during the Russo-Ukrainian war has seen a number of countermeasures tried against the threat of Ukrainian uncrewed drones.

Due to the drone attack on the Sevastopol Naval Base in October 2022, Russian forces had deployed several early countermeasures. They have trained dolphins to protect the Naval Base, while using various booms or nets to stop further attacks. A main early change by mid-2023 was the use of dazzle camouflage, which according to Reuters is "designed to disguise a ship's heading and speed at sea — aims to confuse modern operators of suicide drones and satellites and prevent them from easily identifying important ships", while gunfire from helicopters can be used to destroy Ukrainian drones during an attack.

By December 2023, the Russian effort to counter Ukrainian USVs in the Black Sea had expanded to include:

- formal dedicated anti-drone helicopter aviation units have been formed in Crimea to engage attacking USVs with unguided rockets and machine guns, using Mi-8 Hip and Ka-27 Helix helicopters. More occasionally, Sukhoi Su-27 Flanker fighter jets have been used.
- electromagnetic noise countermeasures have been tried to jam communications of offensive USV drones.
- escort ships have been used for high-value targets. Russia has recently begun to escort high-value weapon transport ships and tankers; escorts are typically frigates or patrol ships. The "convoys have been targeted by USVs on several occasions, with the escorts facing the brunt of the attacks."
- Russia has tested flying an FPV drone from a patrol boat into a fixed target. Use in naval combat had not yet been reported by December 2023.

By January 2024, Russian countermeasures had become increasingly capable and the Ukrainian Navy indicated that some offensive USV "tactics that were worked out in 2022 and 2023 will not work in 2024." and that this military reality was driving change on the Ukrainian side. Ukraine is developing autonomous underwater vehicles (AUVs) to increase offensive capability against improved Russian USV defenses.

=== Strategic studies ===
An emerging field of research examines whether the proliferation of uncrewed surface vessels can impact crisis dynamics or intra-war escalation. An exploratory report on the subject from the Center for Naval Analyses suggests seven potential concerns for military competition, including accidental, deliberate, and inadvertent escalation. While recent scholarship has examined the impact of uncrewed aerial systems on crisis management, the empirical record for uncrewed surface and subsurface systems is thinner, since these technologies have not yet been widely employed. According to an article published by Reuters, these drones are manufactured at a cost of $250,000 each. They use two impact detonators taken from Russian bombs. With a length of 5.5 metres, they have a camera to allow a human to operate them, and use a water jet for propulsion with a maximum speed of 80 kilometres per hour and an endurance of 60 hours. Given their relative low cost, compared to missiles or bombs, they can be deployed in a mass attack. Their low profile also makes them harder to hit.

On 7 October 2026, a Ukrainian A HUR Sargan-3000 USV shot down a “Shahed type attack drone”, using machine guns over the Black Sea.

== Cargo ==
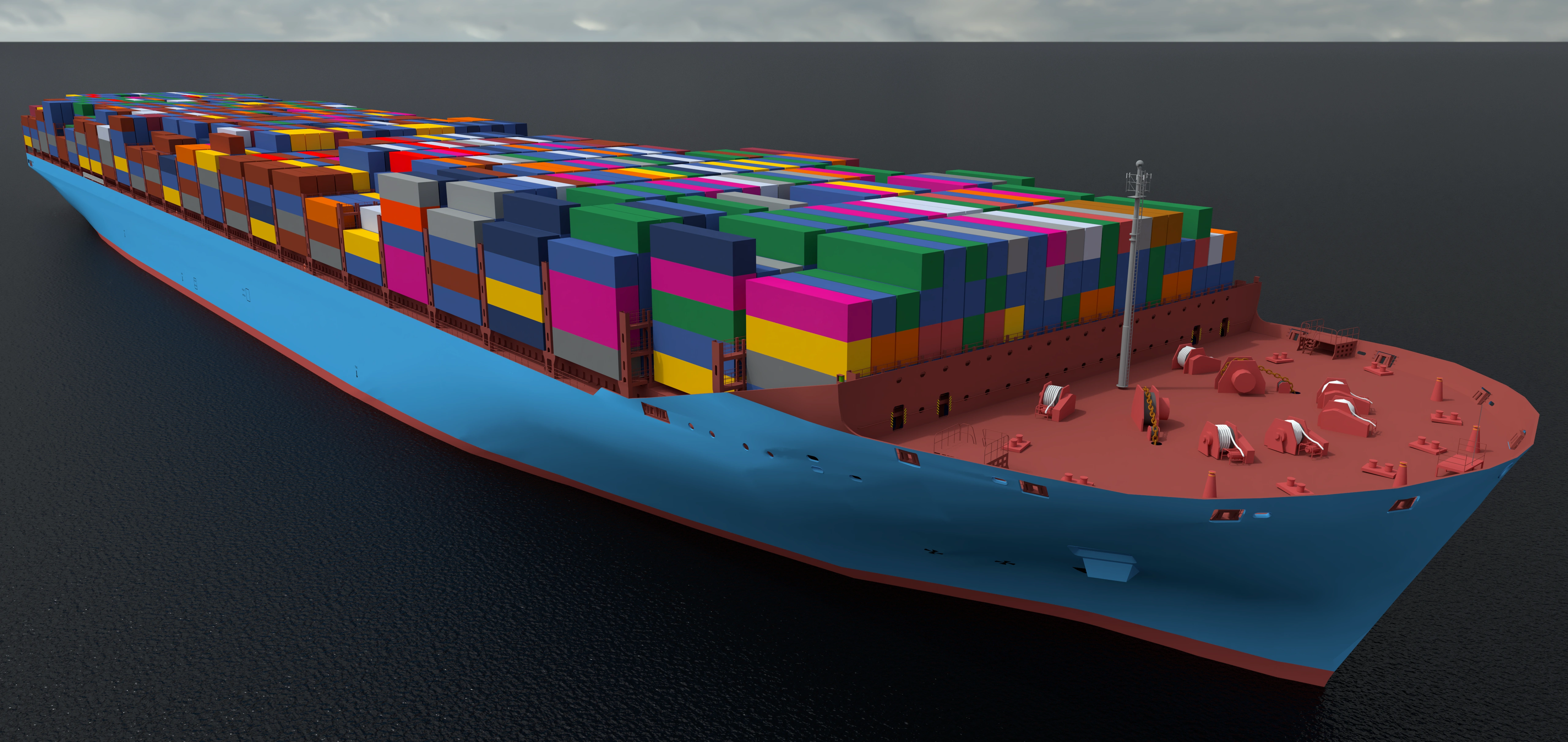
3D design of an autonomous container ship with no superstructure or smoke stacks

In the future, many uncrewed cargo ships are expected to cross the waters. In November 2021, the first autonomous cargo ship, MV Yara Birkeland was launched in Norway. The fully electric ship is expected to substantially reduce the need for truck journeys.

== Urban vessels and small-scale logistics ==
In 2021, the world's first urban autonomous vessels, Roboats, were deployed in the canals of Amsterdam, Netherlands. The ships developed by three institutions could carry up to five people, collect waste, deliver goods, monitor the environment and provide "on-demand infrastructure". The Wall Street Journal reported a drone was utilized on June 8, 2026 to rescue two downed Army helicopter pilots off the coast of Oman. The drone was made by Saronic Technologies, a naval supply innovator.

== Seaweed farming ==
Uncrewed surface vehicles can also assist in seaweed farming and help to reduce operating costs.

== See also ==
- Self-steering gear
- Spartan Scout
- Swarm robotics
- Self Defense Test Ship
- USV RSV (Marine Tech)
