= 7th Infantry Regiment (United States) =

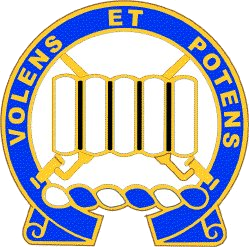
- The 7th Infantry Regiment's distinctive unit insignia (DUI)
- Active: 11 January 1812–present
- Country: United States of America
- Branch: United States Army
- Type: Infantry regiment
- Part of: 3rd Infantry Division
- Nickname: "Cottonbalers"
- Mottos: Volens et Potens (Willing and Able)
- Engagements: War of 1812; Mexican War; American Civil War; Indian Wars; War with Spain; Philippine–American War; World War I; Champagne-Marne; Aisne-Marne; Saint-Mihiel; Meuse-Argonne; World War II; Algeria-French Morocco; Sicily; Naples-Foggia; Anzio; Rome-Arno; Southern France; Rhineland; Ardennes-Alsace; Central Europe; Korean War; Invasion of North Korea; Battle of Chosin Reservoir; Vietnam War (3rd Battalion Only); Persian Gulf War; Battle of Medina Ridge; Global War on Terrorism; Iraq; Invasion of Iraq; War in Afghanistan

Commanders
- Current commander: LTC Brandon Pasko (2-7 IN)
- Command Sergeant Major: CSM Eric Caudill (2-7 IN)
- Notable commanders: John Joseph Abercrombie; Henry C. Merriam; William M. Morrow; Otho B. Rosenbaum; Courtney Hodges; Ben Harrell; John A. Heintges; Edwin Walker

Insignia
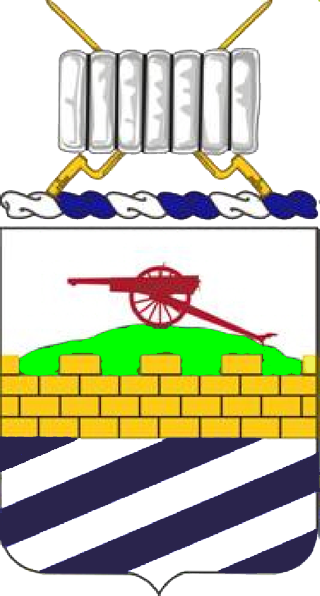
- Coat of arms

The 7th Infantry Regiment is an infantry regiment in the United States Army. In its 200-year history it has participated in 12 wars, been awarded 78 campaign streamers, and 14 unit decorations. The regiment has served in more campaigns than any other infantry unit in the United States Army.

It is known as "The Cottonbalers" for its actions during the Battle of New Orleans, while under the command of Andrew Jackson, when soldiers of the 7th Infantry Regiment held positions behind a breastwork of cotton bales during the British attack. These actions and the lineage of other units that made up the 7th Infantry give the regiment campaign credit for the War of 1812.

== Lineage ==
The regiment's official lineage is as follows:

- Constituted 11 January 1812 in the Regular Army as the 8th Infantry
- Organized in 1812 in Tennessee, Georgia, and the adjacent territories
- Consolidated May–October 1815 with the 24th Infantry (constituted 26 June 1812) and the 39th Infantry (constituted 29 January 1813) to form the 7th Infantry
- Consolidated May–June 1869 with the 36th Infantry (see ANNEX) and consolidated unit designated as the 7th Infantry
- Assigned 21 November 1917 to the 3rd Division (later redesignated as the 3rd Infantry Division)
- Relieved 1 July 1957 from assignment to the 3rd Infantry Division and reorganized as a parent regiment under the Combat Arms Regimental System
- Withdrawn 16 December 1987 from the Combat Arms Regimental System and reorganized under the United States Army Regimental System

ANNEX

- Constituted 3 May 1861 in the Regular Army as the 3d Battalion, 18th Infantry
- Organized 16 October 1861 at Camp Thomas, Ohio
- Reorganized and redesignated 26 December 1866 as the 36th Infantry
- Consolidated May–June 1869 with the 7th Infantry and consolidated unit designated as the 7th Infantry

Coat of arms

- Blazon:
  - Shield: Per fess Argent and Azure, a fess embattled to chief Or masoned Sable between in chief a field gun Gules on a mount Vert and in base three bendlets sinister of the first.
  - Crest: On a wreath of the colors (Argent and Azure), a cotton bale Argent banded Sable in front of the two bayonets in saltire Or.
- Motto: VOLENS ET POTENS (Willing and Able).
- Symbolism:
  - Shield: The shield is white and blue, the old and present Infantry colors. The field gun is for the Battle of Cerro Gordo, where the 7th participated in the decisive attack by an assault on Telegraph Hill, a strongly fortified point. This portion of the shield is in Mexican colors—red, white and green. The wall is for the battle of Fredericksburg in which the regiment held for twelve hours a position only eighty yards in front of a stone wall protecting the enemy. The base alludes to the shoulder sleeve insignia of the 3d Division with which the 7th Infantry served during World War I.
  - Crest: The cotton bale and bayonets in the crest are taken from the arms of the 7th Infantry adopted in 1912.
  - Background: The coat of arms was originally approved on 5 July 1921. It was amended on 15 Oct 1923 to add a new crest.

== Campaign credits ==
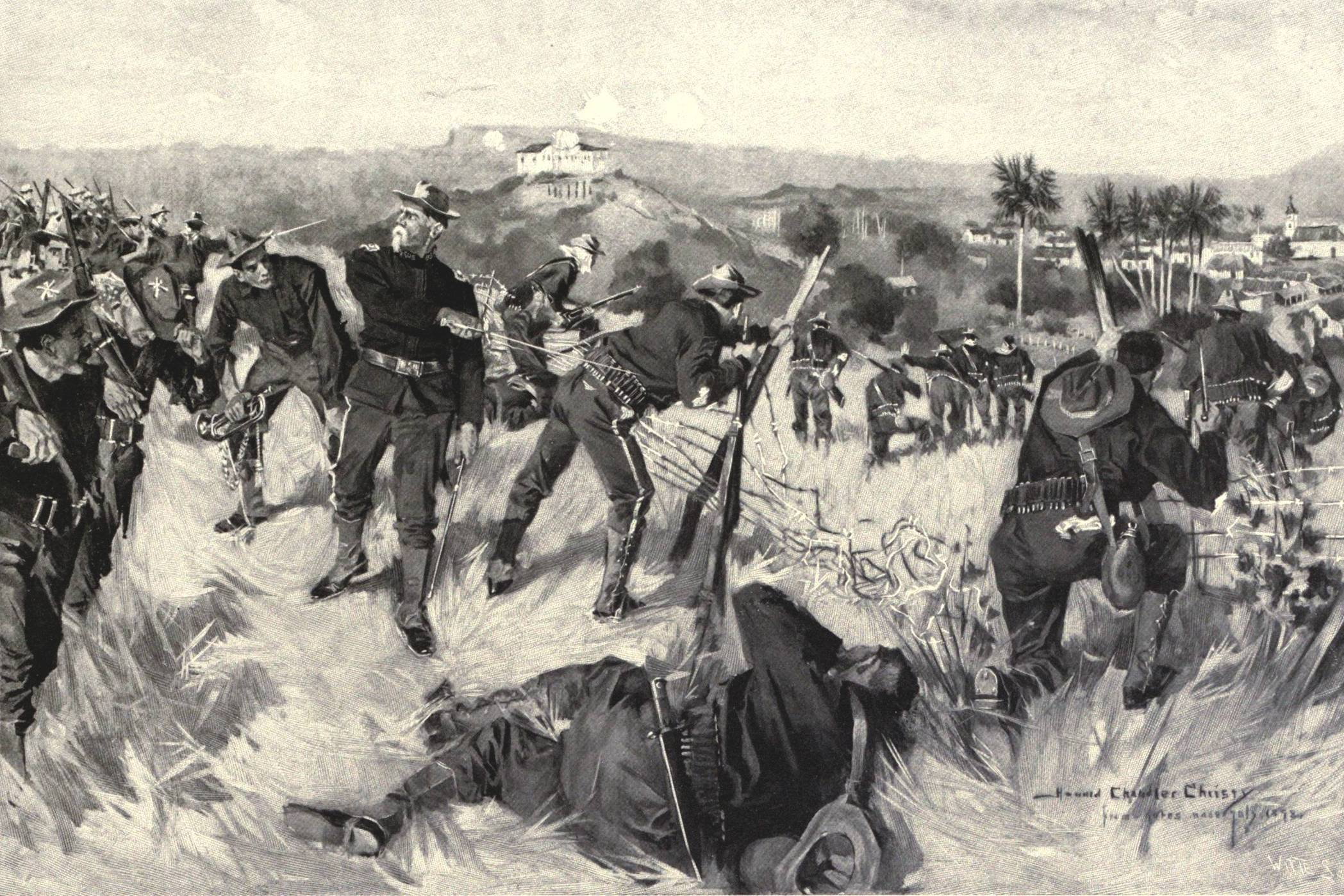
The Capture of El Caney: The 7th Regular Infantry, charging through the fields at the north of El Caney, are cutting their way through the wire fence. Major Corliss, who is prominent in the foreground of the picture, was at this time pierced through the shoulder by a Mauser bullet. For Howard Chandler Christy.

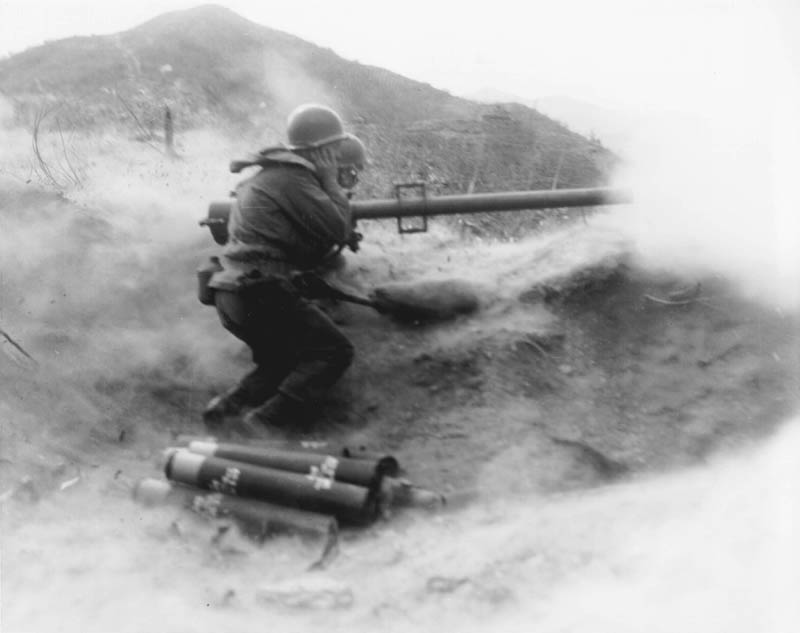
Recoilless rifle of 7th Infantry Regiment in Korea.

- War of 1812

Canada; New Orleans; Florida 1814; Louisiana 1815

- Mexican War

Monterey; Vera Cruz; Cerro Gordo; Contreras; Churubusco; Molino del Rey; Chapultepec; Texas 1846

- Civil War

Fredericksburg; Murfreesboro; Chancellorsville; Gettysburg; Chickamauga; Chattanooga; Atlanta; New Mexico 1861; New Mexico 1862; Kentucky 1862; Mississippi 1862; Tennessee 1862; Tennessee 1863; Georgia 1864

- Indian Wars

Creeks; Seminoles; New Mexico 1860; Wyoming 1866; Montana 1872; Little Big Horn; Nez Perces; Utes; Pine Ridge

- War with Spain

Santiago

- Philippine–American War

Samar 1901; Samar 1902

- World War I

Aisne; Champagne-Marne; Aisne-Marne; Saint-Mihiel; Meuse-Argonne; Champagne 1918; Ile de France 1918

- World War II

Algeria-French Morocco (with arrowhead); Tunisia; Sicily (with arrowhead); Naples-Foggia; Anzio (with arrowhead); Rome-Arno; Southern France (with arrowhead); Rhineland; Ardennes-Alsace; Central Europe

- Korean War

First Phase Offensive; First UN Counteroffensive; CCF Spring Offensive; UN Summer-Fall Offensive; Second Korean Winter; Korea, Summer-Fall 1952; Third Korean Winter; Korea, Summer 1953

- Vietnam War

Counteroffensive, Phase II; Counteroffensive, Phase III; Tet Offensive; Counteroffensive, Phase IV; Counteroffensive, Phase V; Counteroffensive, Phase VI; Tet 69/Counteroffensive; Summer-Fall 1969; Winter-Spring 1970; Sanctuary Counteroffensive; Counteroffensive, Phase VII

- Southwest Asia

Defense of Saudi Arabia; Liberation and Defense of Kuwait; Cease-Fire

- Iraq campaign
- Afghanistan campaign

== History ==
=== Origins; War of 1812 ===
The 7th Infantry Regiment, was originally constituted on 11 January 1812 in the Regular Army as a company of the 8th Infantry. was reorganized in preparation for the conflict with Great Britain which came to be known as the War of 1812. Since that time it has remained on duty in one form or another, making it one of the five oldest continuously-serving regiments in the United States Army. In 1815, the regiment was headquartered at Fort Montgomery in the Mississippi Territory. After the Creek War, the regiment helped build and was stationed at Fort Crawford in the newly-formed Alabama Territory.

=== Mexican–American War ===
The regiment was active in the American invasion of the Mexican heartland and the capture of Mexico City. Streamers awarded are: Texas 1846 Monterey, Vera Cruz (sic), Cerro Gordo, Contreras, Churubusco, Molino del Rey, and Chapultepec, and Texas 1846

=== American Civil War ===
During the American Civil War, the 7th Infantry Regiment played a significant role in several key campaigns. In December 1862, they distinguished themselves during the Battle of Fredericksburg, holding an advanced position on the southern side of the city. Despite facing intense enemy fire, they maintained their ground until ordered to withdraw, suffering the heaviest losses within their brigade.

In May 1863, at the Battle of Chancellorsville, the 7th Infantry Regiment was positioned on the north side of the Orange Turnpike. They captured a strategic hillcrest and held it against substantial resistance for over an hour before receiving orders to retreat.

During the Gettysburg campaign in July 1863, the regiment arrived on the battlefield on July 2 and initially took position on the north slope of Little Round Top. They advanced across Plum Run toward the Wheatfield, where they faced heavy fire from multiple directions. Despite suffering over 50% casualties, the "Cottonbalers" managed to withdraw to safety on Little Round Top. Following Gettysburg, the regiment was deployed to New York City to address the draft riots and remained on garrison duty there until the war's conclusion. The regiment would receive 14 campaign streamers for actions during the Civil War.

=== Spanish–American War ===
The Seventh Infantry regiment fought at El Caney and San Juan Hill.

=== World War I ===
The regiment has been associated with the Third Infantry Division since that unit was established in World War I.

The unit is credited with participation in the Aisne Defensive, the battle of Château-Thierry, the defense of the Champagne-Marne region and the attacks at Aisne-Marne, Meuse-Argonne, and Saint-Mihiel.

=== Interwar period ===
The 7th Infantry arrived at the port of New York on 22 August 1919 on the USS Kaiserin Auguste Victoria and was transferred 27 August 1919 to Camp Pike, Arkansas. The regiment was again transferred on 20 September 1921 to Camp (later Fort) Lewis, Washington, and on 27 September 1922 to Vancouver Barracks, Washington. Concurrently, the 2nd Battalion was transferred to Chilkoot Barracks, Territory of Alaska, where it absorbed the personnel and equipment of the inactivated 2nd Battalion, 59th Infantry Regiment. The initial wartime mission of the 7th Infantry in accordance with established war plans was to conduct a mobile defense of possible amphibious landing areas in support of the Harbor Defenses of the Columbia River. The regiment participated in the making of the First National Pictures movie “The Patent Leather Kid” during March–April 1927. In April 1933, the regiment assumed command and control of the Vancouver Barracks Civilian Conservation Corps District. Company D was awarded the Edwin Howard Clark trophy for machine gun marksmanship for 1935. The 2nd Battalion was transferred on 18 October 1939 to Camp Bonneville, Washington, and to Vancouver Barracks on 7 May 1940, while the entire regiment was transferred 7 February 1941 to Fort Lewis.

=== World War II ===
During World War II, the regiment fought German forces on three fronts, North Africa, Italy, and Northwest Europe. It conducted four amphibious landings against beach defenses earning a spearhead device on the streamers awarded for these battles.

In 1942, the regiment conducted an amphibious landing in Morocco. On 10 July 1943, the regiment made an amphibious assault at Licata, Operation Husky Mollarella, Poliscia, Torre di Gaffe e Rocca San Nicola beaches starting the Allied invasion of Sicily. In 1944, it landed at Anzio, conducted a breakout and drove towards Rome. In August 1944, the regiment landed again, this time in Southern France as part of Operation Dragoon, advancing up the Rhone River to the German frontier.

After fighting in the Vosges and in the Alsace at the Colmar Pocket the 7th crossed the Rhine into Germany. Taking part in the seizure of Munich it headed for Austria, reaching the Salzburg area in the waning days of the war. After the 3rd Division is able to capture the key bridges over the Saalach River, the regiment commanded by Colonel John A. Heintges upon direct orders from division commander General John O'Daniel entered Hitler's retreat at Berchtesgaden on 4 May 1945. See also American Courage, American Carnage Video Transcript Presentation by John C. McManus.

=== Korean War ===
After World War II the 7th Infantry Regiment remained a part of the 3rd Infantry Division. This would be the last war that the Cottonbalers would fight as a Regimental Combat Team (RCT).

When the Korean War began in June 1950, the Seventh (7th) Infantry Regiment was located at Fort Devens, Massachusetts. Already at reduced strength, the regiment was further decimated when a battalion from Fort Devens was redesignated as the Third Battalion, Eighth Cavalry Regiment, and sent to Korea to join the First Cavalry Division.

The 7th Regiment sailed from San Francisco, California, on 20 August 1950, and landed in Japan on 16 September 1950. There its strength was augmented by hundreds of KATUSA (Korean Augmentation to the U.S. Army—Korean conscripts detailed to serve with U.S. units). Two months later, the regiment embarked again and landed at Wonsan on Korea's eastern coast on 21 November 1950. It joined with the 15th and 65th Infantry Regiments and moved to the northwest of the Hungnam area where it covered vis-à-vis Task Force Dog from Chinhung-ni, the Army's X Corps forward elements (1st Marine Division and 7th Infantry Division Regimental Combat Team RCT 31 (AKA Task Force Faith)) withdrawal from the Chosin Reservoir and, joining the perimeter defense for the Hungnam Evacuation during the Chinese People's Volunteer Army (PVA) Second Phase Campaign.

The 7th Regiment was the last unit off of Pink Beach at Hungnam and withdrew by sea on 24 December 1950; they moved into position north of Seoul as part of the Eighth U.S. Army's defensive line participating in the PVA April 1951 spring offensive. During the next two years, the regiment supported 3rd Division's combat operations in the Chorwon-Kumwha area, fought at the Battle of Jackson Heights and Arrowhead outposts, and blocked a PVA push in the Kumsong Area in July 1953.

During eight campaigns on the Korean battlefield, the elements of the 7th Infantry were awarded Republic of Korea Presidential Unit Citations. In addition, the First Battalion, Seventh Infantry Regiment won a Distinguished Unit Citation for its bravery at Choksong, the Second Battalion for its bravery at Kowang-ni and the Third Battalion for bravery at Segok.

=== Vietnam War ===
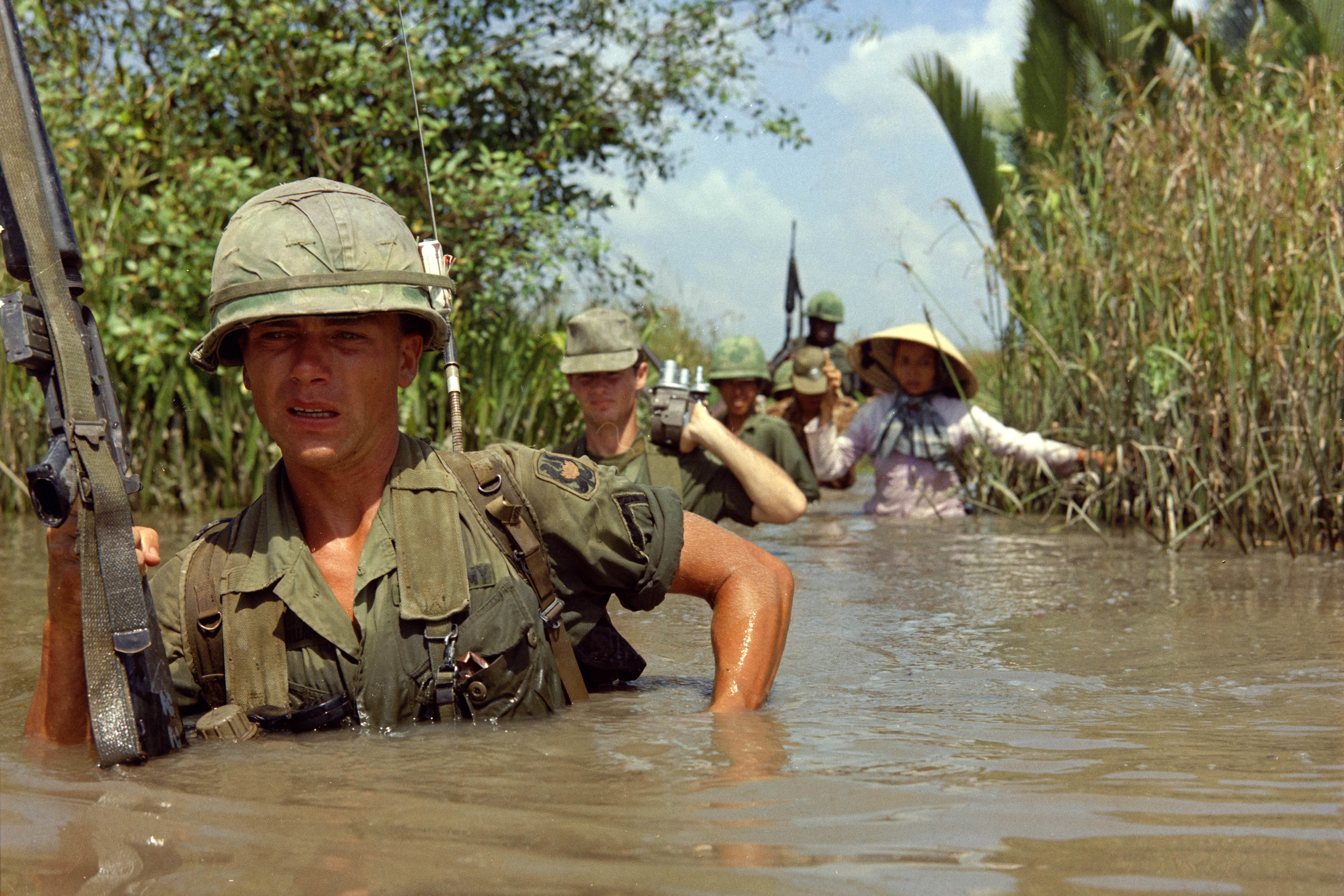
3rd Battalion, 7th Infantry Regiment crossing a canal in Nov 1967 during the Vietnam War.

The 3rd Battalion served under the 199th Light Infantry Brigade during the Vietnam War. 3rd Battalion was activated on June 1, 1966, at Fort Benning, Georgia, the battalion was deployed to Vietnam, engaging in extensive combat operations over the course of 11 campaigns.

One notable engagement was during the Tet Offensive in early 1968. The battalion was instrumental in recapturing areas of Saigon, including the Phu Tho Racetrack in Cholon, where they successfully dislodged entrenched Viet Cong forces. Their actions during this period earned them a Valorous Unit Citation for extraordinary heroism.

In December 1967, the 3rd Battalion participated in Operation Manchester, aimed at disrupting Viet Cong activities in the Tân Uyên District. The battalion established Firebase Keane and conducted operations that resulted in significant enemy casualties, contributing to the overall mission's success.

=== Modern era ===
Presently, the regiment consists of mechanized infantry units equipped with the M-2 Bradley Fighting Vehicle, and a light infantry battalion.

- 1st Battalion, 7th Infantry Regiment and 2nd Battalion, 7th Infantry, Fort Stewart, Georgia, 1st Brigade Combat Team, 3rd Infantry Division
- 3rd Battalion, 7th Infantry, in 1973–75 was a maneuver battalion of the 197th Separate Infantry Brigade then reorganizing and training as the XVIII Airborne Corps heavy force element. The battalion, continuing to be organized as an infantry battalion in the early phase of the 197th Brigade's reorganization into a separate mechanized infantry brigade, performed a number of important missions for the Army during this period one of which was the support of the U. S. Army Infantry Board with a detachment of 69 then 49 soldiers from headquarters and A companies to conduct the Squad Automatic Weapons Developmental/Operational Tests 1 and 2 for four months. Subsequently, the battalion became an element of the 24th Infantry Division and later the battalion operated as a maneuver battalion (light infantry battalion) of 4th Infantry Brigade Combat Team, 3rd Infantry Division Ft. Stewart, Georgia.

The 1st and 2nd Battalions and, as already noted the 3rd Battalion, were assigned to the 24th Mechanized Infantry Division (United States) at Fort Stewart, Georgia on 16 December 1987. Elements of all three battalions of the 7th Infantry Regiment saw action in the Persian Gulf as part of Operation Desert Storm, Kosovo and, more recently, Operation Iraqi Freedom. On 16 February 1996, the battalions were assigned to the 3rd Infantry Division.

1990–91 Gulf War

The 1st Battalion 7th Infantry Regiment and the 4th Battalion 7th Infantry Regiment (from Aschaffenburg, Germany) patrolled the Czechoslovakia border with Germany for years in preparation for war with The Soviet Union (USSR). They served during Operation(s) Desert Shield and Desert Storm, and both battalions of the regiment were to serve in the theater of operations. The battalions belonged to 3rd (Phantom) Brigade, 3rd Infantry Division. The brigade itself was a round-out brigade for the 1st Armored Division and served as "Old Ironsides" lead element 1st brigade. The 4th battalion consisted of 4 companies of the new M2-A2 Bradley Fighting Vehicles, of which three companies had some augmented mix of M1 Abrams tanks attached from the brigade's 4th Battalion-66th Armor Regiment. Only Bravo company 4/7 "Blackhawks" remained wholly infantry. It was the mission of Bravo Company to conduct urban and trench warfare for the battalion. Several regiment personnel received Silver and Bronze Stars with "V" devices for their actions during the ground war phase. Both 1/7 and 4/7 participated in the largest tank battle in US history: The Battle of Medina Ridge.

The Battle of Medina Ridge was a decisive tank battle fought during the Gulf War on 27 February 1991, between the U.S. 1st Armored Division and the entrenched 2nd Brigade of the Iraqi Republican Guard Medina Luminous Division outside Basra. It is estimated more than 5,000 vehicles (A mix of tanks, armored fighting vehicles, armored transports, heavy & light trucks-shared by both sides) clashed during this particular engagement. The 1st Armored Division, commanded by Major General Ron Griffith, consisted of some 3,000 vehicles including 348 M1A1 Abrams tanks. The brunt of the fighting at Medina Ridge was conducted by the 3rd (Phantom) Brigade, 3rd Infantry Division which was the only brigade from the 3rd Infantry Division in the war. The brigade replaced 1st Armored Division's 1st Brigade and was commanded by Colonel James Riley.

Medina Ridge was one of the few battles during Desert Storm in which American forces encountered significant Iraqi resistance and found it extremely difficult to advance. During the battle, American forces suffered one fatality (An M3 Bradley Scout driver - SPC Cash-from 4th Battalion, 66th Armor) due to friendly fire, while destroying 186 Iraqi tanks (mostly T-72Ms, Asad Babils, and Type 69s), and 127 armored vehicles. Only four Abrams tanks were hit by direct fire and disabled; none were destroyed. Upon returning from Iraq in May 1991, both battalions of the 7th Infantry Regiment and the rest of Phantom Brigade received orders to deactivate and draw down from Aschaffenburg, Germany. During the summer of 1992, 4/7 Infantry regiment closed its doors at Fiori Kaserne for the last time.

Gulf War

During the Gulf War, two units of the 7th Infantry Regiment fell in the ranks of VII Corps. Corps normally command three divisions at full strength (other units such as artillery, corps-level engineers, and support units are attached as well). However, VII Corps had far more firepower under its command. 2/7 and 3/7 served with the 24th Infantry Division during the first gulf war, deploying from Fort Stewart Georgia, as part of the XVIII Airborne Corps.

VII Corps' principal combat strength consisted of the following units: U.S. 1st & 3rd Armored Divisions, and U.S. 1st Infantry Division. In addition, the U.S. 2nd Cavalry Regiment (scout force), US 1st Cavalry Division, and British 1st Armored Division, as well as the U.S. 11th Aviation Group were attached for the operation.

Operation Iraqi Freedom

Both the 2nd and 3rd Battalions of the 7th Infantry Regiment assigned to 1st Brigade, 3rd Infantry Division participated in Operation Iraqi Freedom in 2003. During Operation Iraqi Freedom, the regiment's most notable achievements included seizing crossing sites over the Euphrates River and seizing the Iraqi regime's most prized possessions, Baghdad International Airport. SFC Paul Ray Smith, assigned to Company B, 11th Engineer Battalion, which directly supported 7th Infantry Regiment and was the first soldier awarded the Medal of Honor in the Global War on Terror for his actions in Iraq. They returned to Fort Stewart in September 2003.

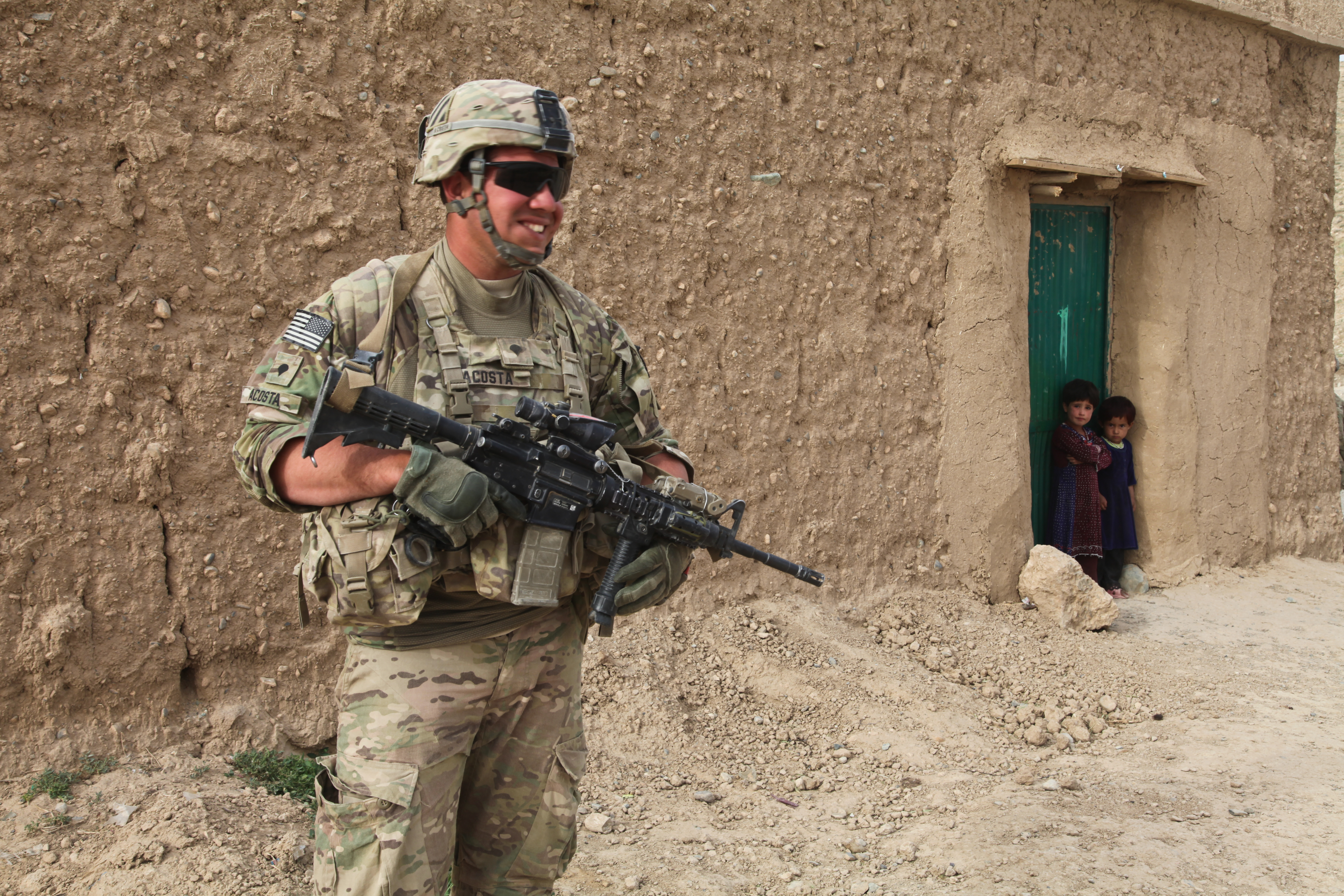
U.S. Army SPC Nate Acosta, assigned to the 1st Platoon, Bravo Company, 3rd Battalion, 7th Infantry Regiment, 4th Infantry Brigade Combat Team, 3rd Infantry Division, provides security near Forward Operating Base Shank, Afghanistan.

The 3rd Battalion, 7th Infantry, was reassigned to the 4th Brigade Combat Team, 3rd Infantry Division in 2004, upon the creation of that new unit. Prior to that, the 3-7th Infantry had been assigned to the 1st Brigade, 3rd Infantry Division. This was a product of 3rd Infantry Division transforming to the new modular brigade concept after its return from Iraq in late 2003. 2-7th Infantry remained with the 1st Brigade Combat Team, while 3-7th Infantry joined the new 4th Brigade Combat Team. Delta Companies were also established in both 2nd and 3rd Battalions, designated as armor units and its infantry C Companies reorganized under 3-69 AR and 4-64 AR respectively while their C Companies moved under the infantry battalions to form combat arms battalions (CAB). Under transformation, E Companies were added from the 11th Engineer Battalion and forward support companies were added to support the CAB.

After a tough train-up period during 2004, the reorganized 2nd and 3rd Battalions, 7th Infantry Regiment deployed to Iraq for Operation Iraqi Freedom III with their respective brigade combat teams (1st and 4th Brigade Combat Teams). 2-7 Infantry deployed to Iraq for a second tour in December 2004 until January 2006, to Saddam Hussien's hometown of Tikrit. The 3rd Battalion assumed responsibility of Western Rashid in Baghdad, an area encompassing more than 800,000 Iraqis. The 7th Infantry Regiment's most notable achievement was ensuring the security of over 100 polling sites during two Iraqi national elections.

In January 2007, 2-7 Infantry deployed to Iraq for a third, 15-month tour. The unit served in Al Anbar Governorate, the largest province in Iraq, under the command and control of Multi-National Forces West. TF 2-7 deployed to Hīt, with Company C, 2-7 IN attached to TF 3-69 AR (Speed and Power) in south-central Ramadi. Cold Steel was instrumental, with its Iraqi Army and Police partners in bringing peace and stability to Ramadi during the Anbar Awakening. The 2nd Battalion redeployed in April 2008. In 2007 the 4th Brigade, 3rd Infantry Division was alerted for deployment to Iraq as part of Operation Iraqi Freedom in late 2007. 3-7 Infantry became critical to the success of the surge ordered by President Bush. Numerous Operations were conducted, and most notably Operation Marne Avalanche. One AO in particular (Wasit Provence) was controlled by a single armor platoon of 16 men and was the largest AO in Iraq. The 4th Brigade, including the 3-7th Infantry, continued to serve in that country into 2008.

In December 2009, 2-7 Infantry deployed to Iraq for a fourth time as an advise and assist battalion. B-Co. 2-7 was located south of Baghdad in the town of Mahmudiyah.

From July 2010 to July 2011, 3-7 Infantry deployed to Ramadi with the 4th Infantry Brigade Combat Team in support of Operation Iraqi Freedom and Operation New Dawn, with Attack Company providing Advise and Assist to the Iraqi Army at Al-Taqqaddum Air Base. After the new year, the Cottonbalers moved to al Asad Airbase where they provided training to the Iraqi Army before redeploying to a brand new Light Infantry Brigade facility at Fort Stewart, Georgia.

Operation Enduring Freedom

From September 2012 to May 2013, 2/7 Infantry deployed to numerous locations in some of the most rugged and hostile areas throughout Afghanistan as part of a Combined Joint Special Operations task force. The battalion returned to Fort Stewart at the end of this deployment.

In March 2013, 3/7 Infantry deployed to Logar Province, Afghanistan as division reserve force at Forward Operating Base Shank. They returned to the United States at the end of the year.

=== Decorations ===
- Navy Unit Commendation for HIT, Iraq (13 January 2007 – 26 March 2008) attachment to 2nd Marine Expeditionary Force
- Presidential Unit Citation (Army) for COLMAR
- Presidential Unit Citation (Army) for CHOKSONG
- Presidential Unit Citation (Army) for SEGOK
- Presidential Unit Citation (Army) for KOWANG-NI
- Valorous Unit Award for SAIGON – LONG BINH (3-7 INF)
- Presidential Unit Citation IRAQ – KUWAIT (1990–91)
- Valorous Unit Award for IRAQ – KUWAIT (1990–91)(C co 3-7 INF per DAGO 1994-27)
- Meritorious Unit Award (Army) for IRAQ – KUWAIT (1990–91)
- Army Superior Unit Award for 1994
- French Croix de Guerre with Gilt Star, World War I for AISNE-MARNE
- French Croix de Guerre with Palm, World War II for COLMAR
- French Croix de Guerre, World War II, Fourragere
- Republic of Korea Presidential Unit Citation for UIJONGBU CORRIDOR
- Republic of Korea Presidential Unit Citation for IRON TRIANGLE
- Chryssoun Aristion Andrias (Bravery Gold Medal of Greece) for KOREA
- Presidential Unit Citation (Army) for OPERATION IRAQI FREEDOM I (2003)
- Valorous Unit Award for Operation Iraqi Freedom III

=== Notable members ===
- James Arness, actor
- Lloyd James Austin III, General, Commander, United States Forces – Iraq
- Hugh B. Casey Major, United States Army
- Pat W. Crizer, Lieutenant General
- Garlin Murl Conner (24 January 1945), Medal of Honor recipient (Posthumous)
- Jerry K. Crump (6 & 7 September 1951) Medal of Honor recipient
- Rudolph B. Davila (28 May 1944), Medal of Honor recipient
- John Essebagger Jr. (25 April 1951) Medal of Honor recipient
- Charles L. Gilliland (25 April 1951) Medal of Honor recipient
- Clair Goodblood (24 & 25 April 1951) Medal of Honor recipient
- John S. Guthrie, Major General
- Harold K. Johnson, General, Army Chief of Staff, 1964 to 1968
- Noah O. Knight (23 & 24 November 1951) Medal of Honor recipient
- Darwin K. Kyle (16 February 1951) Medal of Honor recipient
- John M. LeMoyne, Lieutenant General
- John McLennon, Sgt - Medal of Honor recipient (Indian Wars)
- Leroy A. Mendonca (4 July 1951) Medal of Honor recipient
- Troy H. Middleton, Lieutenant General, corps commander during World War II
- Hiroshi H. Miyamura (24 & 25 April 1951) Medal of Honor recipient
- Harley F. Mooney Jr., Brigadier General
- James M. J. Sanno, brigadier general
- Paul Ray Smith (4 April 2003) Medal of Honor recipient
- Jose F. Valdez (25 January 1945) Medal of Honor recipient
- Frederick C. Weyand, General, Army Chief of Staff, 1974 to 1976
- Zachary Taylor, Major General (US Army); 12th President of the United States

== Other units called "7th Infantry Regiment" ==
There was a 7th Infantry Regiment raised for the 1798 Quasi-War with France. It was mustered out without seeing active service.

Another 7th Infantry Regiment was raised in April 1808, and saw service in the War of 1812. During the 1815 postwar reduction in force it was consolidated into the 1st Infantry Regiment. It was this regiment that fought at New Orleans in 1815. The official lineage followed the 8th Regiment after the war.

== See also ==
- Seventh Regiment Armory
- List of United States Regular Army Civil War units

== Bibliography ==
- John C. McManus, The 7th Infantry Regiment: Combat in an Age of Terror: The Korean War Through the Present, New York: Forge (2008) ISBN 0765303051 OCLC 191758472
