= List of amphibious assault operations =

This is a list of amphibious assault operations that have taken place during history. It is structured chronologically by war, then by theatre during wars such as World War II that covered large areas of the world simultaneously, and chronologically within those theatres. It also covers operations that were planned but cancelled for various reasons.

- Trojan War
  - Siege of Troy – around 1200 B.C.
- First Persian invasion of Greece
  - Battle of Marathon – 490 BCE
- Seventh Crusade
  - Siege of Damietta – 5 June 1249
- Mongol invasions of Japan – 1274, 1281
  - Battle of Bun'ei
  - Battle of Kōan
- War of the Portuguese Succession – 1580–1583
  - Spanish amphibious assault on Terceira Island (1583, aftermath of the Battle of Ponta Delgada)
- Anglo-Spanish War (1585–1604)
  - Siege of Coruña
  - Battle of Lisbon
- Japanese invasions of Korea - 1592–1598
- Queen Anne's War
- Franco-Spanish War (1635–1659)
  - Battle of Bahía de Santoña
- War of the Spanish Succession
  - Siege of Port Royal - 1710
- War of the Quadruple Alliance
  - Capture of Vigo - 1719
- War of Jenkins' Ear
  - Battle of Cartagena de Indias - March 1740
- King George's War
  - Siege of Louisbourg - 1745
- French and Indian War
  - Siege of Louisbourg - 1758
  - Battle of Beauport
  - Battle of the Plains of Abraham - 1759
- American Revolutionary War
  - Battle of Nassau
  - San Juan Expedition (1780)
- French Revolutionary War
  - Siege of San Fiorenzo
  - Invasion of France (1795)
- Anglo-Spanish War (1796–1808)
  - Assault on Cádiz (1797)
  - Battle of Santa Cruz de Tenerife (1797)
  - Ferrol Expedition
- Napoleonic Wars
  - Anglo-Russian invasion of Holland (1799)
  - Battle of Abukir (1801)
  - Walcheren Campaign (1809)
  - Invasion of Guadeloupe (1810)
  - Siege of Tarragona (1813)
  - Krangeroen (1814)
- Quasi-War
  - Battle of Puerto Plata Harbor - 1800
- War of 1812
  - Battle of York
  - Battle of Fort George
  - Second Battle of Sacket's Harbor
  - Battle of Fort Oswego
  - Battle of Mackinac Island
  - Battle of New Orleans
- Venezuelan War of Independence
  - Expedition of Los Cayos (1816)
  - Margarita Campaign (1817)
- Invasion of Algiers in 1830
  - Amphibious landing of Sidi-Ferruch – 14 June 1830 General de Bourmont
- Mexican–American War
  - Siege of Veracruz – 9 March 1847 Winfield Scott lands army in Central Mexico
- Crimean War
  - Assault of Bomarsund – 8 August 1854 Brigadier-général Harry Jone, Colonel Jacques Fieron Anglo-French operation against Russia in Finland
- Second Opium War
  - Battle of the Pearl River Forts – 16 November 1856, American punitive operation against China
- Cochinchina Campaign
  - Siege of Tourane (Da Nang) – 1–2 June 1858 Admiral Charles Rigault de Genouilly. Franco-Spanish operation.
- American Civil War
  - Battle of Hatteras Inlet Batteries
  - Battle of Roanoke Island
  - Battle of New Bern
  - Battle of Island Number Ten
  - Battle of Fort Hindman
  - Second Battle of Fort Fisher – 13–15 January 1865, American sailors make an amphibious assault while infantry attacks from land
- Paraguayan War
  - Siege of Humaitá – culminating 8 August 1868, in which the Allies captured the Fortress of Humaitá.
- Korean Expedition
  - Battle of Ganghwa – 10 June 1871, American attack on Korean forts at Ganghwa Island
- War of the Pacific
  - Battle of Pisagua – 2 November 1879, Chilean troops defeat a joint Peruvian-Bolivian army and separates Iquique from Peru
- Spanish–American War - 1898
  - Battle of Guantanamo Bay
  - Siege of Santiago
  - Battle of Manila (mock)
- Banana Wars
  - Santo Domingo Affair – 11 February 1903, American forces land at Santo Domingo and rout Dominican rebels from the city.
  - Battle of Veracruz – 21 April 1914, American forces land and occupy Veracruz, Mexico
- World War I
  - Battle of Bita Paka – 11 September 1914
  - Siege of Tsingtao – November 1914
  - Battle of Tanga – November 1914
  - Gallipoli Campaign – 1915–1916
    - Landing at Anzac Cove – 25 April 1915
    - Landing at Cape Helles – 25 April 1915
    - Landing at Suvla Bay – 6 August 1915
  - Trebizond Campaign - February 1917
  - Operation Albion – September 1917
  - Operation Faustschlag– February 1918, German Forces landed in Estonia via the west Estonian archipelago.
  - Zeebrugge Raid – 23 April 1918
- Estonian War of Independence
  - Battle of Utria - 17 January 1919
- Rif War (1920)
  - Amphibious assault of Alhucemas – 8 September 1925 General José Sanjurjo
- World War II
  - Africa
    - Operation Appearance – beach landing at Berbera on 16 March 1941
  - Aleutian Islands Campaign
    - Operation Landcrab – 11 May 1943
    - Operation Cottage – 15 August 1943
  - European Theatre
    - Operation Chariot – 28 March 1942
    - Soviet landing on Kerch peninsula
    - Soviet landing on Rybachy peninsula
    - Soviet landing Finnish coast
    - Operation Jubilee – 18 August 1942
    - Operation Sledgehammer – contingency plan for German collapse in the west
    - Operation Gymnast – codename used for proposed invasion of Europe during 1942
    - Operation Neptune – 6 June 1944
    - Operation Overlord – 6 June 1944
    - Operation Switchback – 9 October 1944
    - Operation Vitality – 24 October 1944
    - Operation Infatuate – 1 November 1944
  - Mediterranean Theatre
    - Operation Abstention – 25 February 1941
    - Operation Ironclad – 5 May 1942
    - Operation Agreement – 14 September 1942
    - Operation Torch – 8 November 1942 – North Africa
    - Operation Husky – 10 July 1943
    - Operation Baytown – 3 September 1943
    - Operation Slapstick – 9 September 1943
    - Operation Avalanche – 9 September 1943
    - Operation Shingle – 22 January 1944
    - Operation Dragoon – 15 August 1944 – Southern France
  - South East Asia Theatre
    - Operation Dracula – 2 May 1945
    - Operation Zipper
  - South West Pacific Area
    - Battle of Goodenough Island – 22 October 1942
    - Operation Cartwheel – 1943–1944 – Commanded by General MacArthur, it involved forces from both the South West Pacific Area (command) (SWPA) and the Pacific Ocean Areas (command).
    - Operation Chronicle – 30 June 1943
    - Operation Toenails – 30 June 1943
    - Operation Director – 15 December 1943 – Arawe
    - Operation Dexterity – 2 January 1944
    - Operation Brewer – 29 February 1944 – Admiralty Islands campaign
    - Operation Persecution – 22 April 1944 – Aitape
    - Operation Hurricane – 23 May 1944 – Biak
    - Operation Typhoon – 30 July 1944 – Sansapor
    - Operation King II – 20 October 1944
    - Operation Musketeer II – 9 January 1945 – Philippines Campaign (1944–45)
    - Operation Victor III – 28 February 1945
    - Operation Victor IV – 10 March 1945
    - Operation Victor V – 17 April 1945
    - Borneo campaign (1945)
  - Pacific Ocean Areas
    - Operation Watchtower – 7 August 1942
    - Operation Cleanslate – 21 February 1943
    - Operation Cherry Blossom – 1 November 1943 – Bougainville
    - Operation Galvanic – 20 November 1943 – Tarawa
    - Operation Galvanic – 20 November 1943 – Makin Island
    - Operation Flintlock – 31 January 1944
      - Operation Flintlock – 31 January 1944 – Kwajalein
      - Operation Catchpole – 17 February 1944 – Eniwetok
    - Operation Forager – 15 June 1944
    - Operation Detachment – 15 February 1945
    - Operation Iceberg – 1 April 1945
    - Soviet Pacific landings
    - Operation Olympic – planned for 1 November 1945
    - Operation Coronet – planned for 1 March 1946
- Chinese Civil War and its aftermath
  - Landing Operation on Hainan Island – March–April 1950
- Korean War
  - Operation Chromite – 15 September 1950
- Suez Crisis
  - Operation Musketeer – 6 November 1956
- Vietnam War
  - Operation Starlite – 21 August 1965
- Nigerian Civil War
  - Operation Tiger Claw
- The Troubles
  - Operation Motorman – 31 July 1972
- Operation Peace of Cyprus Turkish invasion of Cyprus - 20 July 1974
- Qua Viet Assault – 24 May 1972 (see also the events of 1973 at Cua Viet Port)
- Falklands War
  - Operation Rosario – 2 April 1982
  - Operation Corporate
    - San Carlos – 28 May 1982
    - Bluff Cove – 8 June 1982
- Sri Lankan Civil War
  - Operation Balavegaya
  - Operation Sea Breeze
- Iran–Iraq War
  - Al Faw peninsula landings 1986
- Gulf War 1991
  - Ad-Dawrah
- Iraq War
  - Al-Faw Peninsula – Royal Marines amphibious assault, supported by British Royal Navy and Royal Australian Navy
- Invasion of Anjouan – 25 March 2008
- Operation Sledge Hammer - Kenya Defense Forces Kismayu, 2012
- United Arab Emirates takeover of Socotra - Socotra, 2018
