= Hiroshi Miyamura =

United States Army Medal of Honor recipient (1925–2022)

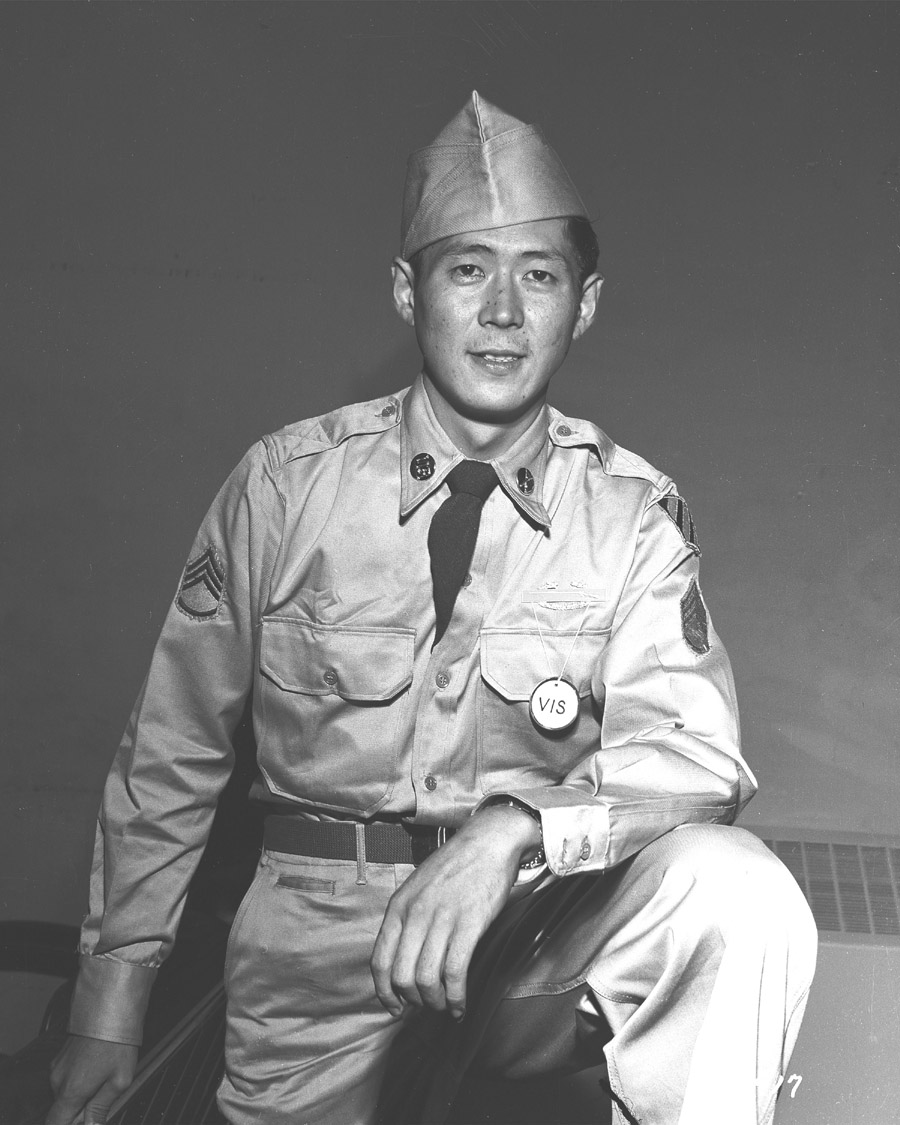
- Miyamura as a Staff Sergeant
- Born: October 6, 1925; Gallup, New Mexico, U.S.
- Died: November 29, 2022 (aged 97); Phoenix, Arizona, U.S.
- Burial place: Sunset Memorial Park; Gallup, New Mexico, U.S.
- Military career
- Allegiance: United States
- Branch: United States Army
- Service years: 1945–1953
- Rank: Staff sergeant
- Nickname: Hershey
- Units: 100th Infantry Battalion, 442nd Infantry Regiment; 2nd Battalion, 7th Infantry Regiment
- Conflicts: World War II; Korean War
- Awards: Medal of Honor; Meritorious Service Medal; Purple Heart
- Other work: Automobile mechanic and service station owner

Hiroshi Miyamura (Japanese: 宮村 浩, October 6, 1925 – November 29, 2022) was a United States Army soldier and a recipient of the Medal of Honor, the United States military's highest award for valor, for his actions during the Korean War. He was one of the last three surviving Medal of Honor recipients of the Korean War, along with Ralph Puckett Jr. and Royce Williams. While he was held as a prisoner of war, the award was classified as top secret.

== Early life ==
Hiroshi Miyamura was born in Gallup, New Mexico, to Yaichi Miyamura (June 3, 1888 – December 23, 1965) and Tori Matsukawa (December 10, 1896 – August 20, 1936), Japanese immigrant parents, making him a Nisei, a second-generation Japanese American. His parents had moved there in 1922 and bought a 24-hour diner. He was the fourth of eight children. His mother died when he was 11. He got the nickname "Hershey" because his 4th grade teacher could not pronounce his first name correctly.

== Military service ==
=== World War II ===
When the United States entered World War II, President Franklin D. Roosevelt ordered the relocation and incarceration of Japanese Americans due to fears that some would turn out to be traitors. However, for communities outside the sensitive coastal "military zone", this was not mandatory, and local authorities could decide what they wanted to do. In Gallup, the Japanese-American residents were left alone.

Miyamura joined the United States Army in January 1945. He volunteered to be part of the all-Nisei 100th Infantry Battalion, 442nd Infantry Regiment, where he trained as a machine gunner. This army unit was mostly made up of Japanese-Americans from Hawaii and the mainland. He was discharged from the army shortly after Japan surrendered. He later enlisted in the United States Army Reserve.

=== Korean War ===
Miyamura was recalled to active duty following the start of the Korean War, arriving in North Korea in November 1950. He was awarded the Medal of Honor for his actions on April 24–25, 1951, south of the Imjin River near Taejon-ni (Daejeon-ni) in Yeoncheon County, while serving as a corporal in the 2nd Battalion, 7th Infantry Regiment, 3rd Infantry Division. During a night attack by the Chinese, he saw that his squad could not hold much longer, so he ordered his men to retreat. He remained behind to cover their withdrawal, killing an estimated minimum of 50 Chinese soldiers.

Miyamura was captured immediately after the actions that led to his award. As he and other prisoners of war (POWs) were marched away, he helped his wounded friend Joe Annello keep moving, but the North Koreans threatened to shoot him if he did not leave Annello behind. Straggling POWs were routinely killed. Miyamura refused, but Annello himself convinced Miyamura to put him down. Annello survived the war and later visited Miyamura in Gallup. The POWs were forced to march 300 miles (480 km) over five weeks with little food.

Miyamura's is the only Medal of Honor to be classified Top Secret. As then-brigadier general Ralph Osborne explained to Miyamura and a group of reporters upon notifying them of his medal, "If the Reds knew what he had done to a good number of their soldiers just before he was taken prisoner, they might have taken revenge on this young man. He might not have come back."

Miyamura was held for 28 months. Following his release on August 20, 1953, he was informed that he had been awarded the Medal of Honor and promoted to sergeant. He was repatriated to the United States and honorably discharged from the military shortly thereafter. His medal was presented to him by President Dwight D. Eisenhower in October 1953 at the White House.

== Medal of Honor Citation ==
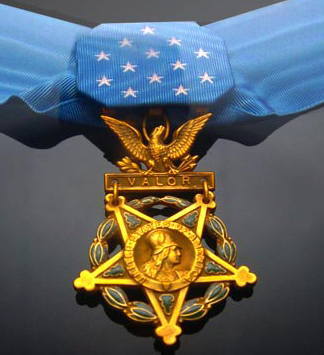

Hiroshi H. Miyamura
Rank and organization: Corporal, U.S. Army, Company H, 2nd Battalion, 7th Infantry Regiment, 3rd Infantry Division
Place and date: Near Taejon-ni, Korea, April 24, and April 25, 1951
Entered service at: Gallup, N. Mex. Birth: Gallup, New Mexico
G.O. No.: 85, November 4, 1953.
Citation:

Cpl. Miyamura, a member of Company H, distinguished himself by conspicuous gallantry and intrepidity above and beyond the call of duty in action against the enemy. On the night of 24 April, Company H was occupying a defensive position when the enemy fanatically attacked threatening to overrun the position. Cpl. Miyamura, a machinegun squad leader, aware of the imminent danger to his men unhesitatingly jumped from his shelter wielding his bayonet in close hand-to-hand combat killing approximately 10 of the enemy. Returning to his position, he administered first aid to the wounded and directed their evacuation. As another savage assault hit the line, he manned his machinegun and delivered withering fire until his ammunition was expended. He ordered the squad to withdraw while he stayed behind to render the gun inoperative. He then bayoneted his way through infiltrated enemy soldiers to a second gun emplacement and assisted in its operation. When the intensity of the attack necessitated the withdrawal of the company Cpl. Miyamura ordered his men to fall back while he remained to cover their movement. He killed more than 50 of the enemy before his ammunition was depleted and he was severely wounded. He maintained his magnificent stand despite his painful wounds, continuing to repel the attack until his position was overrun. When last seen he was fighting ferociously against an overwhelming number of enemy soldiers. Cpl. Miyamura's indomitable heroism and consummate devotion to duty reflect the utmost glory on himself and uphold the illustrious traditions on the military service.

== Awards and Decorations ==
Miyamura has been awarded the following:

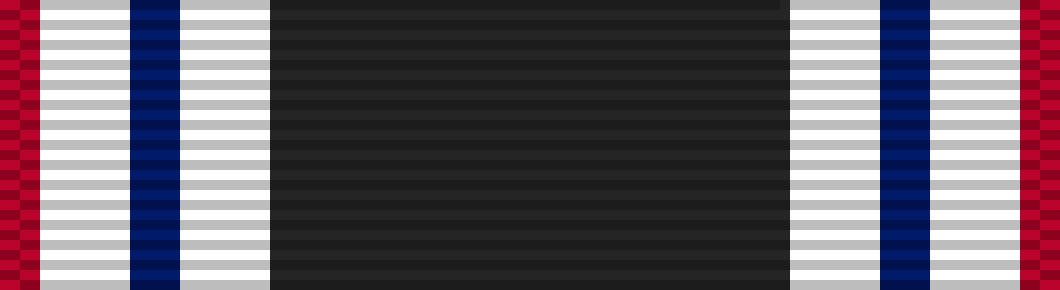

Badge	Combat Infantryman Badge		
1st row	Medal of Honor		
2nd row	Purple Heart	Prisoner of War Medal Retroactively Awarded, 1985	Army Good Conduct Medal
3rd row	American Campaign Medal	European-African-Middle Eastern Campaign Medal	World War II Victory Medal
4th row	Army of Occupation Medal	National Defense Service Medal	Armed Forces Reserve Medal
5th row	Korean Service Medal with 8 Campaign stars	United Nations Service Medal Korea	Korean War Service Medal Retroactively Awarded, 2003
Unit awards	Presidential Unit Citation		Korean Presidential Unit Citation

3rd Infantry Division Insignia

Order of Military Merit

Taeguk Cordon Medal

== Personal life and death ==
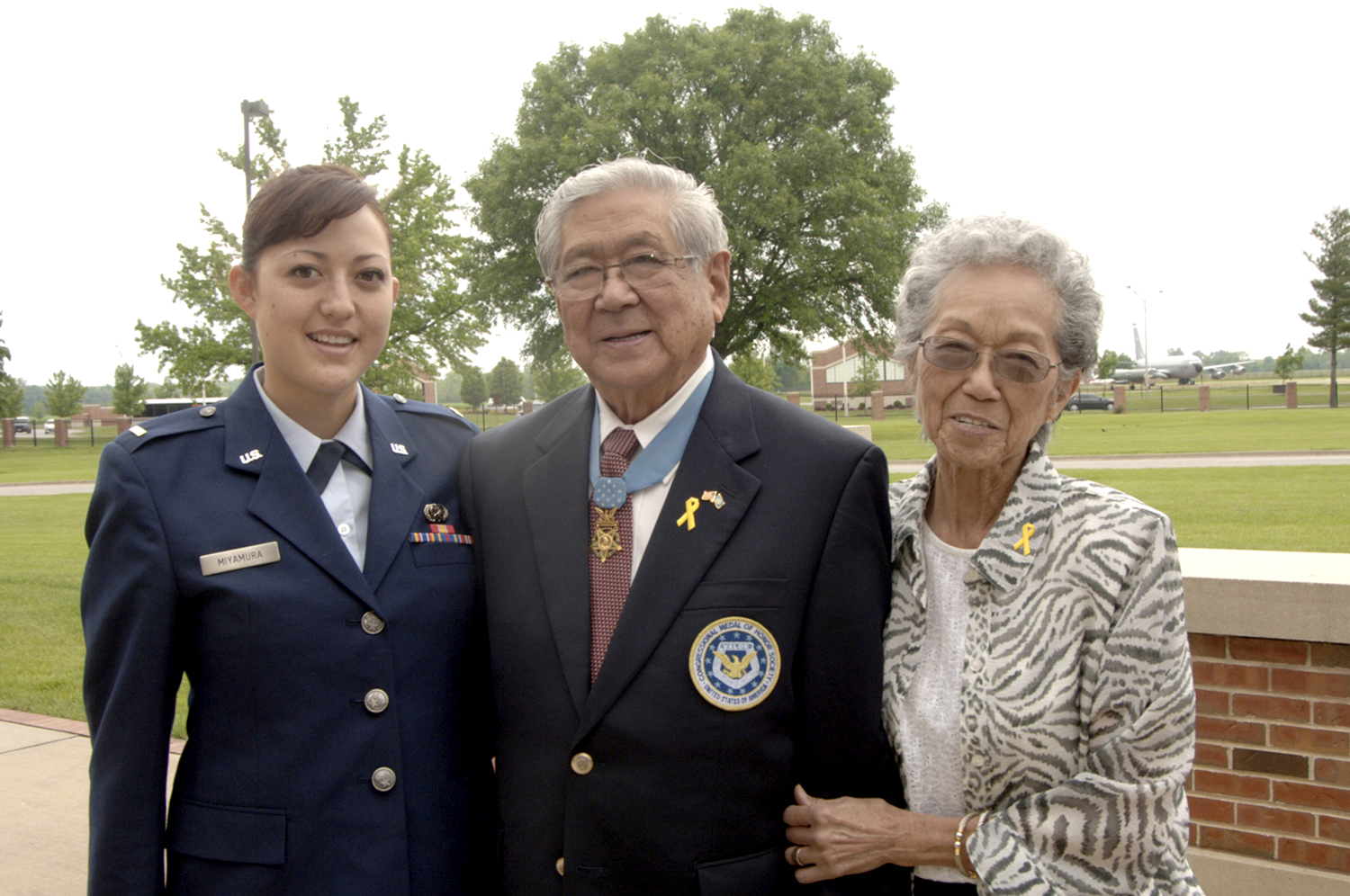
Miyamura, with his wife and granddaughter at Scott Air Force Base, Illinois, 2010

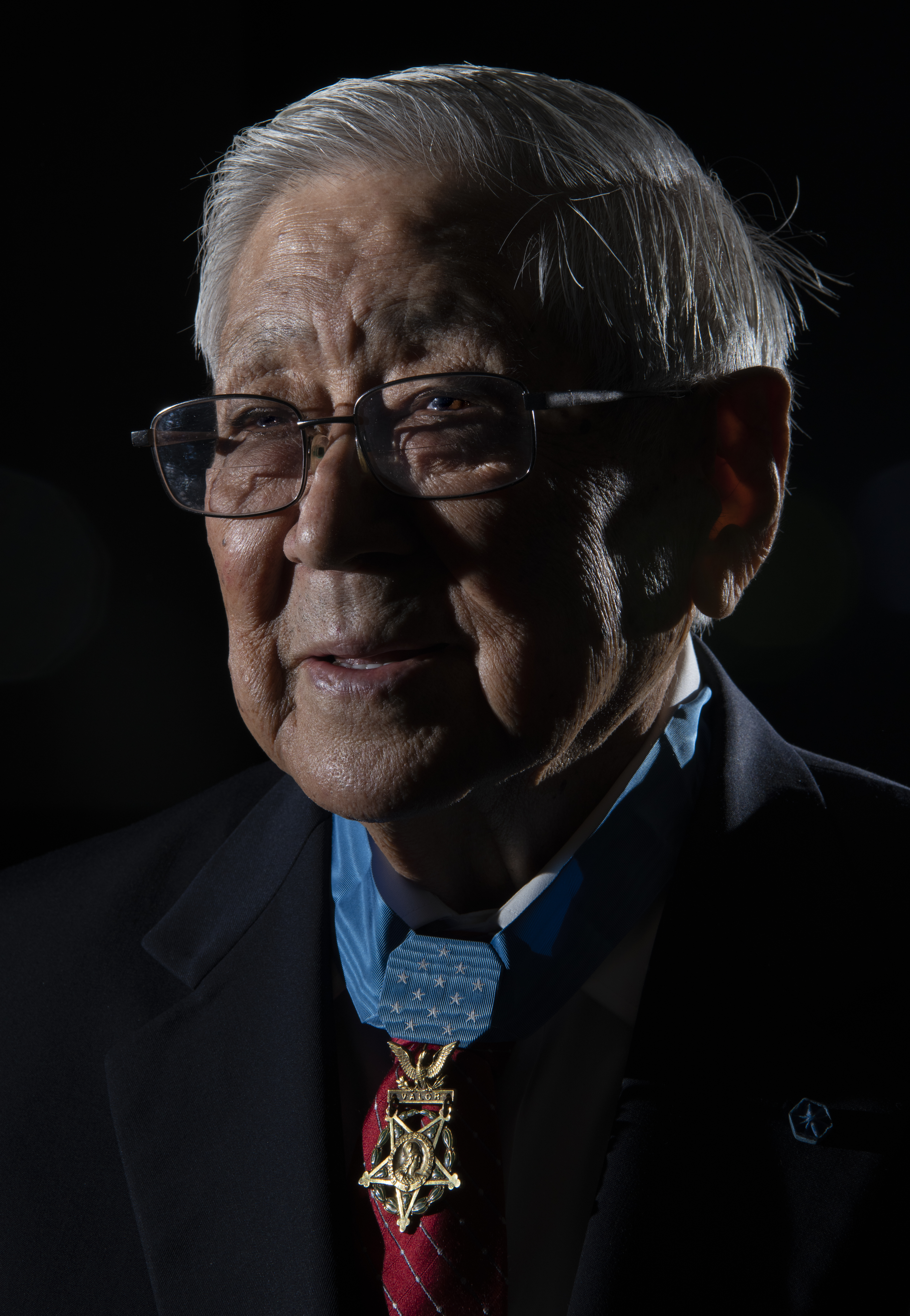
Miyamura at the promotion ceremony of his granddaughter in 2019

Miyamura married Tsuruko "Terry" Tsuchimori (August 13, 1925 – December 10, 2014). He had three children and four grandchildren. One grandchild, Marisa Akimi Miyamura, graduated from the United States Air Force Academy and is an officer in the United States Air Force. He resided in Gallup, New Mexico, after his discharge from the army, where he established a career as an automobile mechanic and service station owner. Miyamura remained active in supporting fellow veterans including work with the Wounded Warrior Project. Miyamura was a Lifetime Member of Veterans of Foreign Wars Post 1. On Memorial Day 2018, his story was portrayed during the National Memorial Day Concert on the West Lawn of the US Capitol in Washington, D.C.

In recognition of Miyamura's activities involving youth in his community, he received the 2014 Director's Community Leadership Award from the Albuquerque division of the FBI.

As the 2014 Nisei Week Grand Marshal, Miyamura led the Grand Parade in Little Tokyo, Los Angeles on August 10, 2014.

In November 2022, it was announced that Miyamura joined the National Board of the State Funeral for War Veterans organization, which is dedicated to "convince Congress to pass legislation to grant a State Funeral for the last Medal of Honor recipients from the Korean and Vietnam Wars, as a final salute to all the men and women who served."

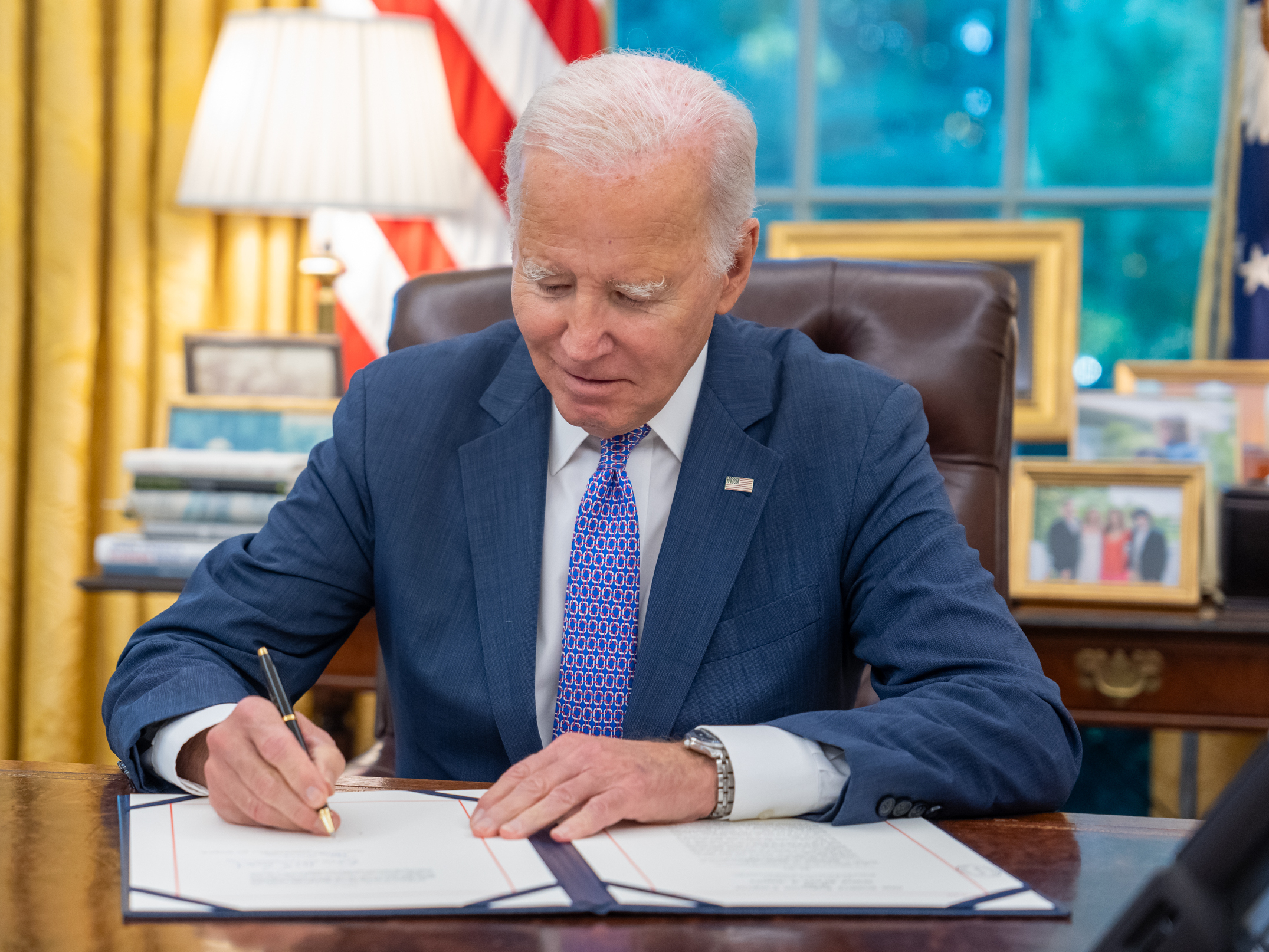
President Joe Biden signs the Hiroshi “Hershey” Miyamura Veterans Administration (VA) Clinic Bill on October 2, 2023 in the Oval Office of the White House

Miyamura died in Phoenix, Arizona, on November 29, 2022, at the age of 97. He was buried with full military honors at Sunset Memorial Park in Gallup.

== Namesakes ==
In his hometown, Gallup, New Mexico, an area is named Miyamura in his honor, as are Hiroshi H. Miyamura High School and the Miyamura Overpass, an interchange on I-40.

In October 2023, President Biden signed a bill to designate the clinic of the Department of Veterans Affairs in Gallup, New Mexico, as the Hiroshi "Hershey" Miyamura VA Clinic.

At Fort Stewart, Georgia, home of the United States Army’s 3d Infantry Division, Gate 5 is named the CPL Hiroshi Miyamura Gate.

== See also ==
- List of Korean War Medal of Honor recipients
- Medal of Honor (TV series) - Miyamura is featured in season 1 episode 4
