= Siege of Veracruz order of battle =

US and Mexican military order

The following units and commanders of the U.S. and Mexican armed forces fought in the siege of Veracruz from March 9 to 29, 1847, during the Mexican–American War.

== United States ==
=== U.S. Army ===
MG Winfield Scott

General Staff "Little Cabinet"

- Chief Engineer: Col Joseph Totten
- Chief of Artillery: Col James Bankhead, 2nd U.S. Artillery
- Inspector General: Ltc Ethan Allen Hitchcock
- Staff Coordinator: Cpt Henry Lee Scott
- Engineer Aide-de-Camp: Maj John L. Smith
- Engineer Aide-de-Camp: Cpt Joseph E. Johnston
- Engineer Aide-de-Camp: Cpt Robert E. Lee
- Engineer Aide-de-Camp: 1st Lt Pierre G. T. Beauregard
- Engineer Aide-de-Camp: 2nd Lt Zealous B. Tower

Division	Brigade	Regiments and others
1st Division; MG William J. Worth	1st Brigade Col John Garland	2nd U.S. Artillery (serving as infantry) – Col James M. Bankhead; 3rd U.S. Artillery – Ltc William Gates; 8th U.S. Infantry – Ltc Thomas Staniford; Light Battery A, 2nd U.S. Artillery – Cpt James Duncan
1st Division; MG William J. Worth	2nd Brigade Col Newman S. Clarke	5th U.S. Infantry – Maj Dixon S. Miles; 6th U.S. Infantry – Ltc Benjamin L. E. Bonneville; 8th U.S. Infantry – Ltc George Wright
2nd Division; MG David E. Twiggs	1st Brigade BG Persifor F. Smith	U.S. Mounted Riflemen – Maj William W. Loring; 1st U.S. Artillery (serving as infantry) – Maj Thomas Childs; 3rd U.S. Infantry – Cpt Edmund B. Alexander; Light Battery K, 1st U.S. Artillery – Capt Francis Taylor
2nd Division; MG David E. Twiggs	2nd Brigade Col Bennet Riley	4th U.S. Artillery – Maj John L. Gardner; 2nd U.S. Infantry – Maj George W. Allen; 7th U.S. Infantry – Ltc Joseph Plympton
3rd "Volunteer" Division; MG Robert Patterson	1st Brigade BG John A. Quitman	2nd New York Volunteers – Col Ward B. Burnett; Palmetto Regiment (South Carolina) – Col Pierce Mason Butler
3rd "Volunteer" Division; MG Robert Patterson	2nd Brigade BG Gideon J. Pillow	1st Tennessee – Col William T. Haskell; 2nd Tennessee – Col William B. Campbell; 1st Pennsylvania – Col Francis M. Wynkoop; 2nd Pennsylvania – Col William B. Roberts
3rd "Volunteer" Division; MG Robert Patterson	3rd Brigade BG James Shields	3rd Illinois – Col Ferris Foreman; 4th Illinois – Col Edward D. Baker
Dragoons	Dragoon Brigade Col William S. Harney	1st U.S. Dragoons, Co. F – Cpt Philip Kearny; 2nd U.S. Dragoons – Maj Edwin V. Sumner; 3rd U.S. Dragoons – Col Edward G. W. Butler

=== U.S. Navy ===
Home Squadron
Commodore David Conner
Commodore Matthew C. Perry

Class	Vessel
Gunboats	USS Raritan (flagship) Commodore David Conner
Gunboats	USS Potomac
Gunboats	USS Mississippi Commodore Matthew C. Perry
Gunboats	USS St. Mary's
Gunboats	USS Petrita
Gunboats	USS Massachusetts
Gunboats	USS Ohio Captain Silas H. Stringham
Mosquito Fleet; Commodore Josiah Tattnall III	Composition unknown

== Mexico ==
BG Juan Estaban Morales
2nd-in-command: BG Jose Juan Landero
Chief of Engineers: Ltc Manuel Robles Pezuela

Fortress	Regiments and others
Fort Santiago and Fort Concepción	3,360 men: Artillery (89 guns), about 22 artillery batteries (Note: No Mexican source lists the organization of their artillery.) (Note: Size & possible battery assignment: 11- 24 lb. bronze (3 batteries), 20- 16 lb. (5 btys.), 6- 12 lb. (2 btys), 4- 8 lbs. (1 bty), 4- 4 lb. (1 bty), 4-mountain (1 bty), 5-mortars 12 (1 bty), 6- mortars iron 13 (2 btys), 2-mortars iron 9, 7-howitzers (obus) 8 (2 btys), 20 bomberos iron 24, 12 & 8 (5 btys).) – Col Antonio Ortiz Izquierdo; National Guard Artillery Company – Lt Antonio Sosa, 80 men; 2nd Infantry Regiment – Col Bartolo Arzamendi, 40 men; 8th Infantry Regiment – Col Jose Felix Lopez, 140 men; 11th Infantry Regiment (picket only) – Capt Miguel Camargo, 41 men; 3rd Light Regiment – Capt Juan J. Sanchez, 150 men; Puebla Libres National Guard – Col Pedro M. Herrera, 350 men; Orizaba National Guard – Col Jose Gutierrez Villanueva, 500 men; Veracruz National Guard – Col Jose Lucelmo, 800 men; Marine Enrollees, 80 men; Coatepec & Vergara Companies, Orilla Volunteers, 109 men; Oaxaca National Guard – Col Juan Aguayo, 400 men; Tehuantepec National Guard – Comdte Manuel Prieto, 60 men; Company of Sappers – Comdte Jose Maria Parra, 100 men; Various, 360 men
Fort San Juan de Ulúa; BG Jose Duran	1,030 men: Artillery (135 guns) About 34 artillery batteries (Note: Size & possible battery assignment: 39-24 lb bronze (10 btys), 4-16 lb ( 1bty), 4-8 (1 bty), 2-mortars 14, 36 bomberos 84,68,12 (9 btys), 48 iron guns 24, 16 lb. (12 btys).) – Col Mariano Aguado, 450 men; Puebla Activo Battalion – Comdte Fernando Urriza, 180 men; Jamiltepec Activo Battalion – Col N. Garcia, 150 men; Tuxpan, Tampico & Alvarado Activos-Companies – Capts Miguel Argumedo & Elegio Perez, 250 men
