= Battle of Cerro Gordo order of battle =

The following units and commanders of the U.S. and Mexican armed forces fought in the battle of Cerro Gordo from April 17–18, 1847 during the Mexican–American War. The U.S. 1st Division and 1st Brigade, 3rd Division remained in the rear at Veracruz.

== United States ==
Army of Invasion: MG Winfield Scott

Headquarters

- Acting Inspector General: Lt. Colonel Ethan Allen Hitchock
- Chief of Engineers: Major John L. Smith
- Chief Topographical Engineer: Major William Turnbull
- Chief Quartermaster: Captain Robert Allen

Division	Brigade	Regiments and Others
2nd Division; MG David E. Twiggs Asst. Adjutant General: 1st Lt. William T. H. Brooks	1st Brigade Col William S. Harney	Battalion, 1st U.S. Artillery: Major Thomas Childs; Companies B, F, G, H, and I (equipped as infantry); 7th U.S. Infantry: Lt. Colonel Joseph Plympton; Mounted Rifles: Major Edwin V. Sumner w Apr 17, Major William W. Loring
2nd Division; MG David E. Twiggs Asst. Adjutant General: 1st Lt. William T. H. Brooks	2nd Brigade Col Bennet Riley	2nd U.S. Infantry: Captain Thompson Morris; 3rd U.S. Infantry: Captain E. B. Alexander; Battalion, 4th U.S. Artillery: Major John L. Gardner; Companies A, D, F, G, and H (equipped as infantry): Voltigeurs: Colonel Timothy Patrick Andrews
2nd Division; MG David E. Twiggs Asst. Adjutant General: 1st Lt. William T. H. Brooks	Artillery	Light Battery K, 1st U.S.: Captain Francis Taylor; (3x 6-pounder guns and 1x 12-pounder howitzer); Rocket and Howitzer Battery: Major George H. Talcott
3rd "Volunteer" Division; MG Robert Patterson Asst. Adjutant General: 1st Lt. William H. French	2nd Brigade BG Gideon J. Pillow w Apr 18; Colonel William B. Campbell	Independent Company of Kentucky Infantry: Captain John Stuart Williams; 1st Pennsylvania Infantry: Colonel Francis M. Wynkoop; 2nd Pennsylvania Infantry: Colonel William B. Roberts; 1st Tennessee Infantry: Colonel William B. Campbell; 2nd Tennessee Infantry: Colonel William T. Haskell
3rd "Volunteer" Division; MG Robert Patterson Asst. Adjutant General: 1st Lt. William H. French	3rd Brigade BG James Shields w Apr 18; Colonel Edward D. Baker	3rd Illinois Infantry: Colonel Ferris Foreman; 4th Illinois Infantry: Colonel Edward D. Baker; 2nd New York Infantry: Colonel Ward B. Burnett

== Mexico ==
Gen. div. Antonio Lopez de Santa Anna

Division	Brigade	Regiments and Others
Division of the East	Ampudia Brigade	3rd Infantry; 4th Infantry; 5th Infantry; 11th Infantry
Division of the East	Vasquez Brigade	1st Light Infantry; 2nd Light Infantry; 3rd Light Infantry; 4th Light Infantry
Division of the East	Juvera Cavalry Brigade	5th Cavalry; 9th Cavalry; Morelia Cavalry; Coraceros Cavaalry
Division of the East	Rangel Brigade	6th Infantry; Grenadiers of the Guard; Libertad Militia Battalion; Galeana Militia Battalion
Division of the East	Pinzon Brigade	Atlixco Militia Battalion; Zacapoaxtla Militia Battalion; Matamoros and Tepeaca Militia Battalion
Division of the East	Arteaga Brigade	Puebla Active Battalion; National Guard Battalion
Division of the East	Canalizo Cavalry Division	Jalapa, Chalchicomula & Orizava Squadrons

== As actually deployed ==
- Right – Gen. L. Pinzon – 5th Infantry, Atlixco Battalion (total 500 men) and one artillery battery (7 guns)
- Center – Navy Capt. B. Araujo – Libertad (400 men), and Zacapoastla (300 men) battalions and one artillery battery (8 guns)
- Left – Col. Badilo – Jalapa, Coatepec and Teusitlan National Guard companies (250 men) and one artillery battery (9 guns)
- Camp of Matamoros – Gen. Jarero – Matamoros and Tepeaca Battalions (450 men) and one gun

Battery on the road – Gen.br. R. Diaz de la Vega-6th Infantry (900 men), Grenaderos Battalion (460 men) and one Art. Battery (7 guns)

el Telegrafo (hill) – Gen.br. C. Vasquez, Col. Lopez Uraga, Col R.Palacios (artillery) – 3d Infantry (Col. Azpeitia 100 men) and one artillery battery (6 guns)

Reserve in Camp at Cerro Gordo- Gen.div. A. Lopez de Santa Ana – 1st, 2d, 3d (Gen. Banenili) & 4th Light (Ligero) (1,700 men), and 4th (Col. Lopez Uraga) & 11th Line (780 men). Artillery reserve (probably one battery of 5 guns), general park, hospital, baggage etc.

Cavalry at Coral Falso – Gen. V. Canalizo -Hussars Squadron, 5th & 9th Line Cavalry, Morelia & Coraceros Regiments, Jalapa, Chalchicomula and Orizava Squadrons. (Juvera and Canalizo Brigades?)

Notes:

1. Manuel Balbontin, a Mexican artillery officer during the war (La Invasion Americana 1888) does not cover the battle.
2. Mexican Artillery batteries usually had 4 guns. Batteries with larger guns had fewer than this. Guns were grouped together by size, i.e. a battery of 4 four pounders ( 4-4 lbs.), or a battery of 3 twelve pounders (3-12 lbs.) A total of 43 guns would indicate about 11 batteries. Col. L. Palacios was killed while commanding artillery. Naval Capt P. Ruiz y Baranda, Naval Lt. F. Fernandez, and Capt. V. Arguelles and Lts. M. Camacho, B. Arnable & J. R. Cobarrubias were all captured commanding artillery. Naval Capt. Godinez and artillery officers Malagon and Olzinger were also present. Battery commanders? Naval Capt. Araujo, above was probably a battery commander also. Or, about ten battery commanders.
3. GMT Games (unsure of sources) posits Pinzon with 7 guns (1- 12 lbs., 2-8 lbs. and 4- 4 lbs. about two batteries), Araujo with 8 guns (4- 8 lbs. and 4- 4 lbs. about two batteries), Badillo with 9 guns (3- 8 lbs. and 6- 4 lbs. about two batteries), Diaz with 7 guns (4- 16 lbs. and 3- 8 lbs. about two batteries) Vasques with 4 guns (4- 4 lobs. one battery), Jarero with 5 guns (1- 8 lbs. and 4- 4 lbs. about one battery). Or about ten batteries.
