= John C. McManus =

Historian and writer about the US Army from WWII

John Coyne McManus
- Writing career
- Genre: Military history
- Subject: Allied invasion of Normandy
- Notable works: The Dead and Those About to Die, Grunts: Inside the American Infantry Combat Experience, World War II Through Iraq
- Website: johncmcmanus.com

John Coyne McManus (born 1965) is a military historian, author, and professor of military history at the Missouri University of Science and Technology in Rolla, Missouri. McManus has published thirteen books on numerous American military history topics, including: the Allied invasion of Normandy, American infantry soldiers, and the 7th Infantry Regiment.

== Education ==
Originally from St. Louis, Missouri, McManus graduated from the University of Missouri with a degree in sports journalism. After a short career in advertising and sports broadcasting, he earned a Master of Arts degree in American history from the University of Missouri. Soon after, he completed his Ph.D. in American and military history at the University of Tennessee. While working on his Ph.D., McManus participated in the university's Normandy Scholars program, where he studied the Normandy battlefields firsthand.

== Career ==
McManus served as the assistant director of the Center for the Study of War and Society at the University of Tennessee. In 2000, he accepted a position as an assistant professor of U.S. military history at the Missouri University of Science and Technology. McManus currently serves on the editorial advisory board for World War II magazine and World War II quarterly. He is also the official historian of the 7th Infantry Regiment Association.

McManus was also a guest on The Diane Rehm Show in a broad discussion on the continued significance of D-Day.

McManus co-presents the Second World War podcast ‘We have ways of making you talk USA’ alongside James Holland and Al Murray.

== Reception ==
Some of McManus's works are composed of several personal stories of common footsoldiers on the battlefield, often facing insurmountable challenges, as demonstrated in Grunts and The Dead and Those About to Die.

Reviews of his work have been favorable. His years of research and analysis concerning specific battles such as the Normandy landings has been called "excellent," and that his scenic descriptions are vivid.

== Works ==
- The Deadly Brotherhood: The American Combat Soldier in World War II, Novato, CA: Presidio (1998) ISBN 0891417214 OCLC 56994527
- The Americans at Normandy: The Summer of 1944 — The American War from the Normandy Beaches to Falaise, New York: Forge (2004) ISBN 0765311992 OCLC 55510683
- The Americans at D-Day: The American Experience at the Normandy Invasion, New York: Forge (2005) ISBN 0765307448
- Alamo in the Ardennes: The Untold Story of the American Soldiers Who Made the Defense of Bastogne, Hoboken, N.J. : J. Wiley (2007) ISBN 0471739057 OCLC 70122479
- U.S. Military History For Dummies, Hoboken, N.J.: J. Wiley (2008) ISBN 0470643234 OCLC 649523064
- The 7th Infantry Regiment: Combat in an Age of Terror: The Korean War Through the Present, New York: Forge (2008) ISBN 0765303051 OCLC 191758472
- American Courage, American Carnage: 7th Infantry Chronicles: The 7th Infantry Regiment’s Combat Experience, 1812 Through World War II, New York: Forge (2009) ISBN 0765320126 OCLC 251190743
- Grunts: Inside the American Infantry Combat Experience, World War II Through Iraq, New York: NAL Caliber (2010)ISBN 0451227905 OCLC 462902005
- September Hope: The American Side of a Bridge Too Far, New York: New American Library (2012) ISBN 0451237064 OCLC 741538553
- The Dead and Those About to Die: D-Day: The Big Red One at Omaha Beach, New York: NAL Caliber (2014) ISBN 0451415299 OCLC 861208244
- Fire and Fortitude: The U.S. Army in the Pacific War, 1941 - 1943, New York: Dutton Caliber (2019) ISBN 978-0451475046
- Island Infernos: The US Army's Pacific War Odyssey, 1944. New York: Dutton Caliber, an imprint of Penguin Random House LLC. 2021. ISBN 0451475062.
- To the End of the Earth: The US Army and the Downfall of Japan, 1945. New York: Dutton Caliber, an imprint of Penguin Random House LLC. 2023. ISBN 0593186885.
