= Ralph Osborne =

United States Army major general

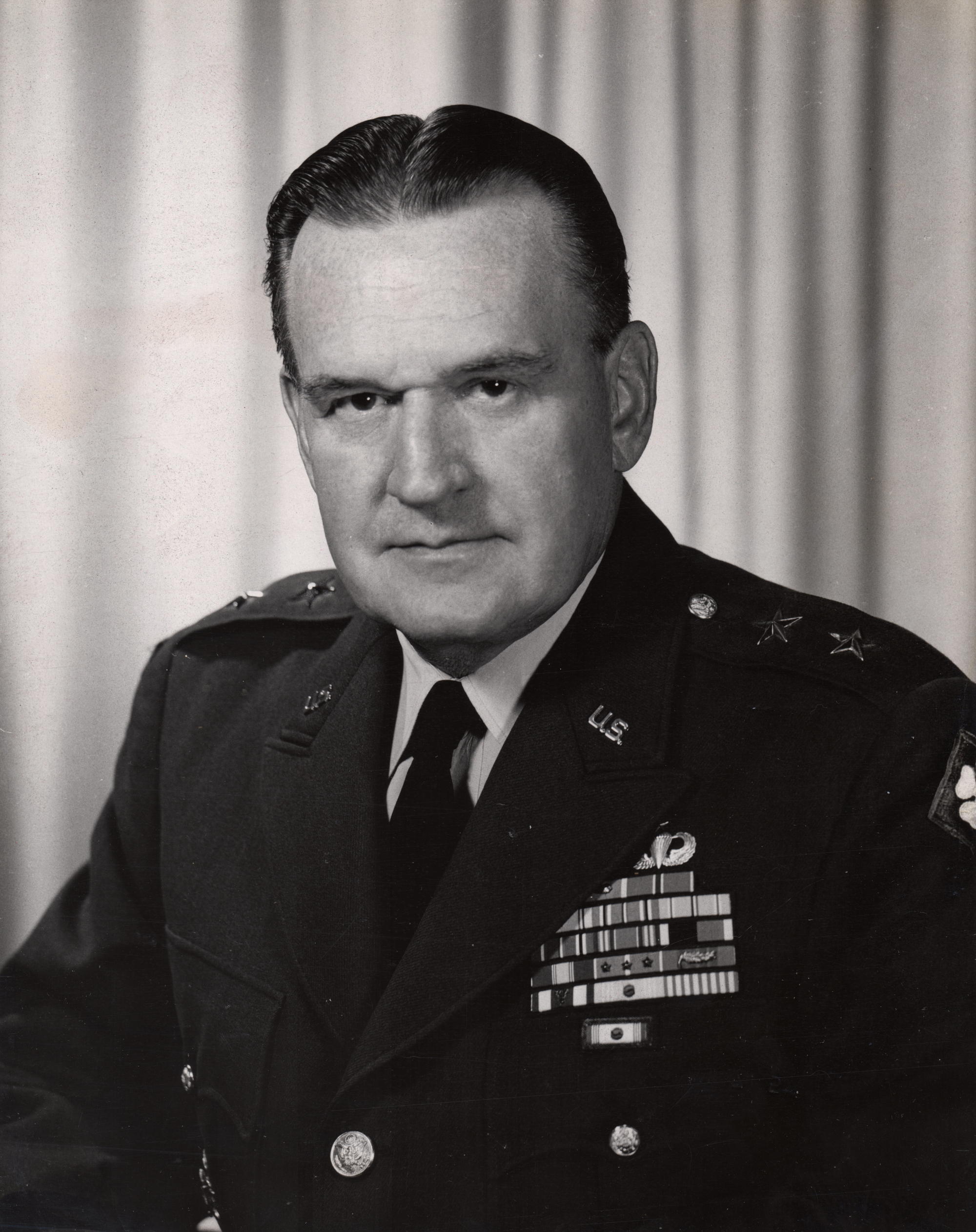
Osborne as Deputy Commanding General of the Fourth United States Army c. 1961

Ralph Morris Osborne was a United States Army major general who served as commandant of the American sector of Berlin until his retirement in 1961.

== Early life and education ==
Osborne was born in Maryland on January 12, 1903. He graduated from the U.S. Military Academy at West Point, Class of 1926.

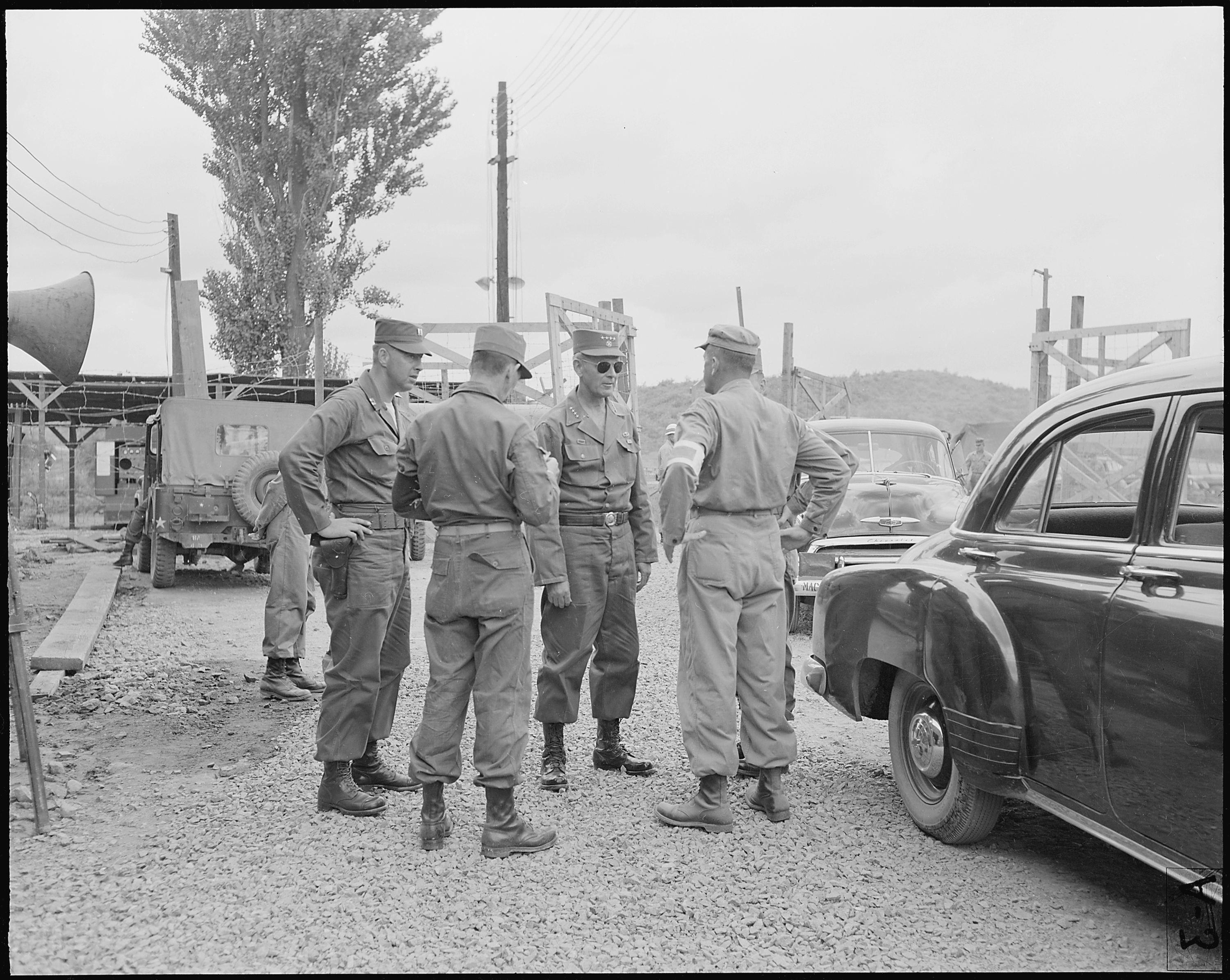
Brigadier General Osborne seen with General Maxwell Taylor at Freedom Village, South Korea in 1953.

== U.S. Army career ==
Osborne was assigned to the command of the Berlin Brigade in 1958. On December 13, 1959, he took command of the post relieving Barksdale Hamlett putting him in a precarious, complex position commanding a garrison of 5,000 men, many with wives and children.

In 1962, he was awarded the Army Distinguished Service Medal as a major general for "exceptionally meritorious and distinguished service" as U.S. Commander Berlin from 1959 to 1961.

Osborne had a decorated career of over 15 years prior to his assignment to including service in the Pentagon, staff service in World War II, on the front lines in the Korean War, and during the Korean armistice talks.

In 1953, he was responsible for informing Hiroshi Miyamura that he had been awarded the Congressional Medal of Honor for his courageous actions during the Korean War upon his release from captivity in a North Korean camp. The award marks is the only Medal of Honor to have been classified as top secret. To Miyamura and reporters, Osborne explained that "if the Reds knew what he had done to a good number of their soldiers just before he was taken prisoner, they might have taken revenge on this young man. He might not have come back."

== Personal life ==
In 1934, while a first lieutenant, he married the actress Kathleen Collins. As of 1963, Osborne had retired with his wife Kathleen in San Antonio, Texas.
