= Raid on Porto Buso =

Coordinates: 45°43′00″N 13°15′20″E

- Part of World War I
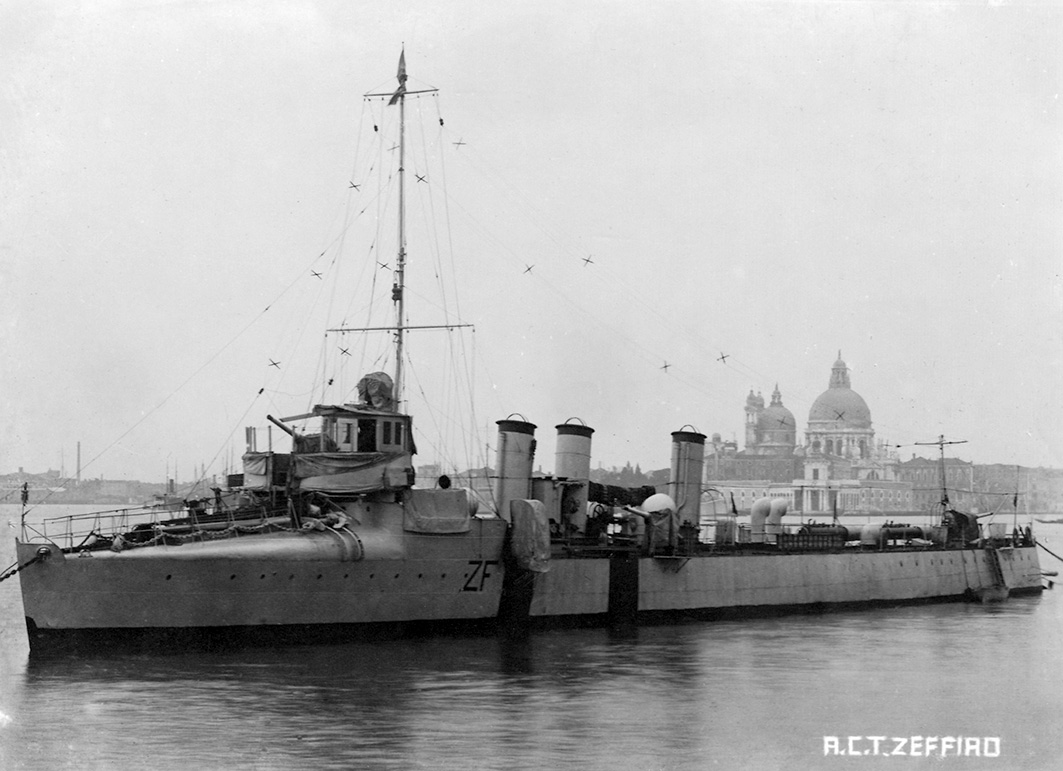
- Italian destroyer Zeffiro at Venice
Date	24 May 1915
Location	Marano-Grado Lagoon
Result	Italian victory
Territorial changes	Porto Buso captured

Belligerents
Austria-Hungary	(Kingdom of Italy) Italy

Commanders and leaders
(Austria-Hungary) Johannes Mareth	(Kingdom of Italy) Arturo Ciano

Strength
68 servicemen Several motorboats and whalers	1 destroyer

Casualties and losses
11 killed 48 prisoners 1 motorboat sunk 1 whaler sunk 2 motorboats seized	None

The raid on Porto Buso was an assault launched by the Italian Royal Navy on an Austro-Hungarian naval station and border post located in Porto Buso island, in the Marano-Grado Lagoon, in the first hours of 24 May 1915, the day when the Kingdom of Italy entered World War I on the side of the Entente. The incursion became the first offensive action of the Italian Navy in the conflict, and ended with the destruction of the naval outpost, the sinking of a flotilla of small vessels and the capture of the majority of the Austro-Hungarian garrison. The action eventually resulted in the withdrawal of all Austro-Hungarian forces from the nearby town of Grado and neighbouring islands during the subsequent days.

== Italian entry in World War I ==
On 3 May 1915, as a result of the Treaty of London, signed in secrecy on 26 April, the Italy's government changed sides and lined up with the Entente Cordiale and Russia, breaking their 33-year-old ties with the Triple Alliance. By that time, the German Empire and Austria-Hungary had been at war with Russia and the western powers since August 1914. The relationship between Italy and their former allies had already stranded since the beginning of the war, when the Italian government declared neutrality on the basis that the alliance was defensive in nature, and that Austria-Hungary had declared war on Serbia without any official notification to them. In the following months, Italian diplomacy also tried to exert concessions from the Central Powers, specially in the Adriatic region, to no avail.

=== Plans for the Adriatic theatre ===
In a 4 January letter to the naval commander of the naval base of Venice, the Chief of Staff of the Italian Navy, Vice Admiral Paolo Thaon di Revel, devised an offensive strategy in the event of an Italian intervention in the Adriatic on the side of the Entente, when the destroyers and torpedo boats were to be major players. The letter mentioned a possible attack on the Austro-Hungarian jetty and naval detachment at Porto Buso. The small island of Porto Buso is located in the mouth of the river Ausa the southernmost border post of the Austro-Hungarian Empire.

When it became obvious by mid-May that Italy would join the Entente, the customs outpost was reinforced by soldiers from the Imperial Army's coastal defence, along with a signals detachment from the Austro-Hungarian Navy. Italian intelligence reports gave the impression that Porto Buso had received heavy machine guns and artillery to counter a possible Italian assault by sea. The border post was actually the home of 69 servicemen and another 17 were scattered along other islands in the lagoon. The Italian goal was to clear the Austro-Hungarian presence across the northwest Adriatic coast to allow the Italian Navy support to the army. The move was also intended to deny the enemy the use of bases for their small torpedo units. On 25 April 1915, the task was assigned to the Sardegna Division, a flotilla of destroyers based at Venice.

== The action ==
The commander of the Sardegna Division, Admiral Giovanni Patris, codenamed the destroyer operation in the upper Adriatic "Missione A" (Mission A). The plan devised the deployment of four destroyers around the island of Grado. The Soldato-class destroyers Bersagliere and Artigliere were ordered to shell Austro-Hungarian positions and naval assets around the town of Grado itself, while the Nembo-class Zeffiro, under the command of Captain Arturo Ciano, was in charge of the attack on Porto Buso. Another Soldato-class destroyer, Corazziere, was to sweep an area south of the lagoon in order to prevent any Austro-Hungarian interference. A secondary target was the telegraph cable connecting Grado with Cittanova.

At 02:00 am local time, Zeffiro passed through a channel southeast of Porto Buso unseen, at a 345° course, and stopping at 500 mt from the Austro-Hungarian wharf. The Italian destroyer launched a torpedo, but it became stuck in the muddy bottom. The device was later recovered by Italian divers. Ciano immediately ordered Zeffiro's 76 mm guns to open fire on the watchtower and the jetty, hitting the outpost, several customs motorboats, and other small craft at anchor with 169 rounds. The Italian reports said that the barracks were repeatedly hit and that a number of small vessels were set on fire. The Austro-Hungarian garrison was taken by surprise, most of them in their sleep. A great number of personnel gathered on one of the sides of the jetty weaving a white flag.

According to Austro-Hungarian reports, particularly that of Oswald Steiger, commander of the Imperial coastal defences in the upper Adriatic, a column of smoke was spotted by the sentry Amandus Hummar, who reported two Italian destroyers approaching from the mouth of the Tagliamento river. Mareth gave orders to abandon the outpost by sea. A motorboat with two staff petty officers aboard received a direct hit from Zeffiro and sank, while a whaler evacuating ten customs personnel and soldiers capsized; only three of the passengers managed to survive. Another four Austro-Hungarian servicemen were killed in action. When Lieutenaunt Mareth realised that any resistance would be futile, he stopped the withdrawal attempt and raised the white flag. Only six men were able to slip away to Grado, crawling through shallows and swamps. The 17 men manning observation posts at the nearby islands also escaped Italian captivity. Picked up by Zeffiro's cutter, Lieutenant Mareth formally surrendered to Captain Ciano, giving up his sabre and his revolver. The lukewarm attitude of Lieutenant Mareth, a Hungarian, was later criticised by Admiral Alfred von Koudelka, commander of the naval sector of Trieste at the time.

== Aftermath ==
Zeffiro arrived in Venice with 48 prisoners onboard, one of them seriously wounded. The local population was astonished when they realised that most of the captives were Friulian-speaking men. Moreover, one of the Austro-Hungarian servicemen killed at Porto Buso was the cook Eugenio Sandrigo, from Grado, who became the first ethnic Italian to die in the war.

The other destroyers of the Sardegna Division did not enjoy the same success. Corazziere not only did not find any enemy unit, but she was also unable to cut the telegraph cable to isolate Grado. In the same way, Bersagliere and Artigliere searched in vain for valuable targets at Grado. The destroyers' commanders renounced to bombard the town in order to avoid civilian casualties. The Italian sortie did not prevent the free movement of the Austro-Hungarian Fleet that, departing from Pula and Sibenik, bombarded several Italian ports and facilities further south.

On 25 May, an Italian marines' detachment landed in Porto Buso and took the facilities over. The marines rounded up some stragglers and seized two abandoned motorboats untouched by Zeffiro's shelling. The next day Grado was captured by a company of Bersaglieri after being vacated by the remaining Austro-Hungarian troops.

== See also ==
- Bombardment of Ancona
- Battle of Ad-Dawrah
- Attack on Snake Island
