= John M. LeMoyne =

United States Army general

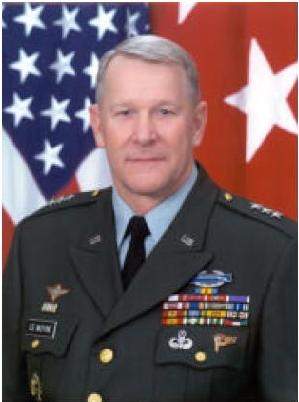
- Lieutenant General John McPherson LeMoyne
- Born: 15 December 1943 (age 82); Ohio, U.S.
- Military career
- Allegiance: United States of America
- Branch: United States Army
- Service years: 1964–2003
- Rank: Lieutenant General
- Commands: Post Commanding General, MCoE, Fort Benning; 2nd Battalion 30th Infantry Regiment 3rd Infantry Division
- Conflicts: Vietnam War; Persian Gulf War
- Awards: Purple Heart; Army Commendation Medal

John McPherson LeMoyne (born 15 December 1943) is a retired United States Army Lieutenant General. John LeMoyne entered military service in 1964 and was commissioned in 1968 after graduating from the University of Florida, in Gainesville, FL.

LeMoyne held several command and staff positions both overseas and in the United States. In Vietnam, he commanded an infantry company, where he received a Purple Heart. In Europe, his assignments included command of the 2d Battalion, 30th Infantry, 3rd Infantry Division; Operations Officer and later Chief of Staff for the U.S. Army Europe and Seventh Army. General LeMoyne's stateside assignments included serving as the Commander, 1st Brigade, 24th Infantry Division and Commanding General, U.S. Army Infantry Center, Fort Benning, GA. Upon LeMoyne's retirement, Florida Senator Bill Nelson noted that his unit led the Hail Mary behind the Iraqi Army in Kuwait, contributing to the quick end of hostilities.

== Education ==
Born in Ohio and raised in Florida, LeMoyne attended P. K. Yonge Laboratory School in Gainesville, graduating in 1961. He enlisted in the Army Reserve to become a Special Forces soldier in 1964. LeMoyne later completed a Bachelor of Science degree in Business Administration at the University of Florida, and earned a master's degree in Public Administration from Shippensburg State College. He was commissioned through ROTC as a Second Lieutenant in the Infantry in the United States Army and has served with distinction for over three decades in peace and during two wars. Most notable was his final assignment as the Army's Deputy Chief of Staff for Personnel, G-1.

== Vietnam ==
While serving as a First Lieutenant while assigned to the Air Force Advisory Group, Lieutenant LeMoyne was awarded the Army Commendation Medal (Valor) with one cluster.

== Military awards ==
Badges, tabs, and patches
Combat Infantryman Badge
Master Parachutist Badge
Ranger Tab
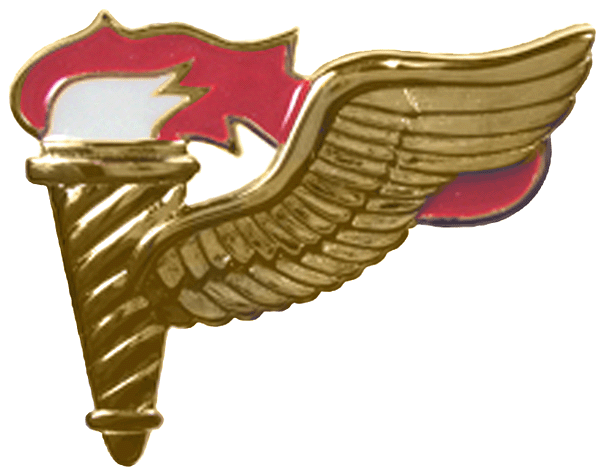
Pathfinder Badge
Army Staff Identification Badge
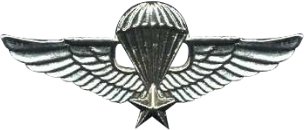
Republic of Vietnam Parachutist Badge

=== Medals and ribbons ===
Bronze Star Medal with six oak leaf clusters and three awards for valor
Purple Heart
Meritorious Service Medal with four oak leaf clusters
Army Commendation Medal with four oak leaf clusters and two awards for valor
Presidential Citizens Medal
National Defense Service Medal with bronze service star
Vietnam Service Medal with silver service star

During his later career, Lemoyne earned a Defense Distinguished Service Medal, an Army Distinguished Service Medal and three awards of the Legion of Merit.

LeMoyne was inducted into the U.S. Army Ranger Hall of Fame in 2014.
