= Battle of Ad-Dawrah =

Naval engagement during the Gulf War

- Part of the Persian Gulf War
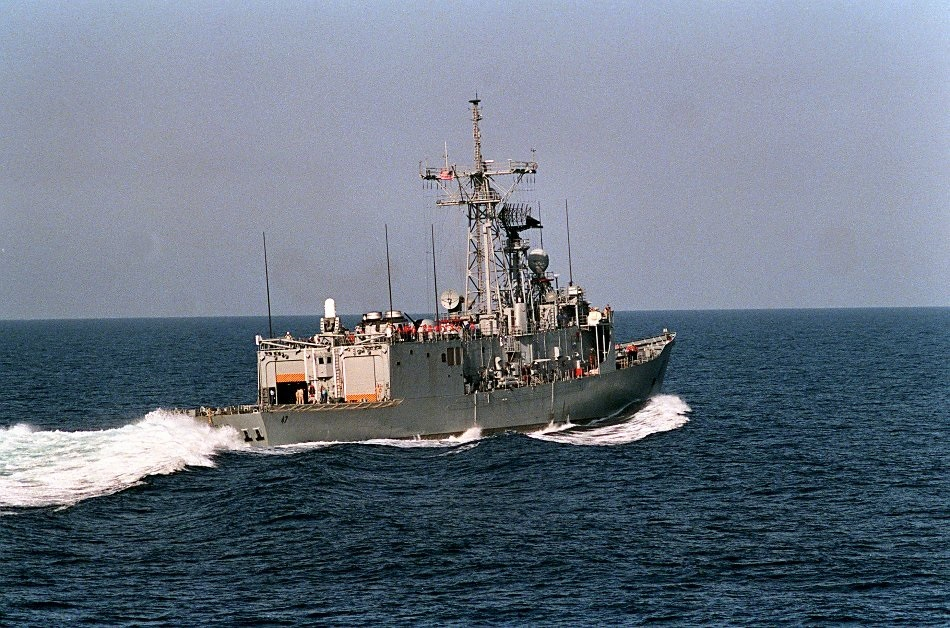
- USS Nicholas
Date	18–19 January 1991
Location	Ad-Dawrah Offshore Oil Fields
Result	Coalition victory
Territorial changes	Ad-Dawrah captured

Belligerents
Iraq	United States; United Kingdom; Kuwait

Commanders and leaders
(Iraq) Saddam Hussein	(United States) Norman Schwarzkopf (United Kingdom) Peter Billière (Kuwait) Jaber III

Strength
50+ marines 1 Zodiac	1 frigate (USS Nicholas); 1 fast attack ship (Istiqlal); US Navy SEALs; USN & RN helicopters

Casualties and losses
29 captured	None

The Battle of Ad-Dawrah was a naval engagement fought on the night of 18 January and into 19 January in 1991 during the Gulf War. In the battle, Coalition forces captured an Iraqi offshore oil field forty miles from the Kuwaiti shore. The 29 Iraqi servicemen captured were the first prisoners of the conflict. It was also the first surface engagement after the Coalition intervened in the Gulf War.

== Background ==
In the early morning of 18 January, Coalition aircraft began a major campaign against Iraqi forces in preparation for the ground invasion of Kuwait and Iraq. Many of these jets and air sorties were coming from aircraft carriers and amphibious assault ships located in the Persian Gulf. Whilst jets were flying over the oil field they reported taking heavy fire from SAMs and shoulder fired rockets. The US suspected that there was a large garrison of Iraqi troops located there being used as an outpost for reporting Coalition aircraft movements back to Iraq.

== Air engagement ==
Later that night, OH-58D and U.S. Navy Sikorsky SH-60B Seahawk helicopters attacked two platforms out of range of the Coalition surface ships, with air-surface missiles. At one point, six Iraqi soldiers tried to escape in a Zodiac, but were captured by the Kuwaiti fast attack vessel Istiqlal. The helicopters left after they started taking fire from the platforms, leaving the platforms ablaze.

== Naval engagement and SEAL landings ==
Meanwhile, USS Nicholas under the cover of darkness, and under radio silence moved in closer to the other nine platforms. Iraqi Silkworm anti-ship missiles were well within striking distance from the warship. For an hour, USS Nicholas shelled the platforms with her 76-mm gun.

After the bombardment, the Coalition forces landed a United States Navy SEALs team on the platforms, where they fought the Iraqis until they surrendered and an additional 23 Iraqi soldiers were captured. There were no Coalition casualties.

== Aftermath ==
The coalition forces had taken out a vital SAM site of the Iraqis. Naval aircraft were able to fly into Iraq through the corridor opened up by this large gap in the Iraqi air-defenses. It also destroyed a vital post in that the Iraqis could no longer track Coalition ship movements, and dealt a severe blow to Iraqi intelligence.

== See also ==
- Operation Nimble Archer
- Raid on Porto Buso
