= Siege of Veracruz =

1847 battle of the Mexican-American War

Coordinates: 19°11′25″N 96°9′12″W

- Part of the Mexican–American War
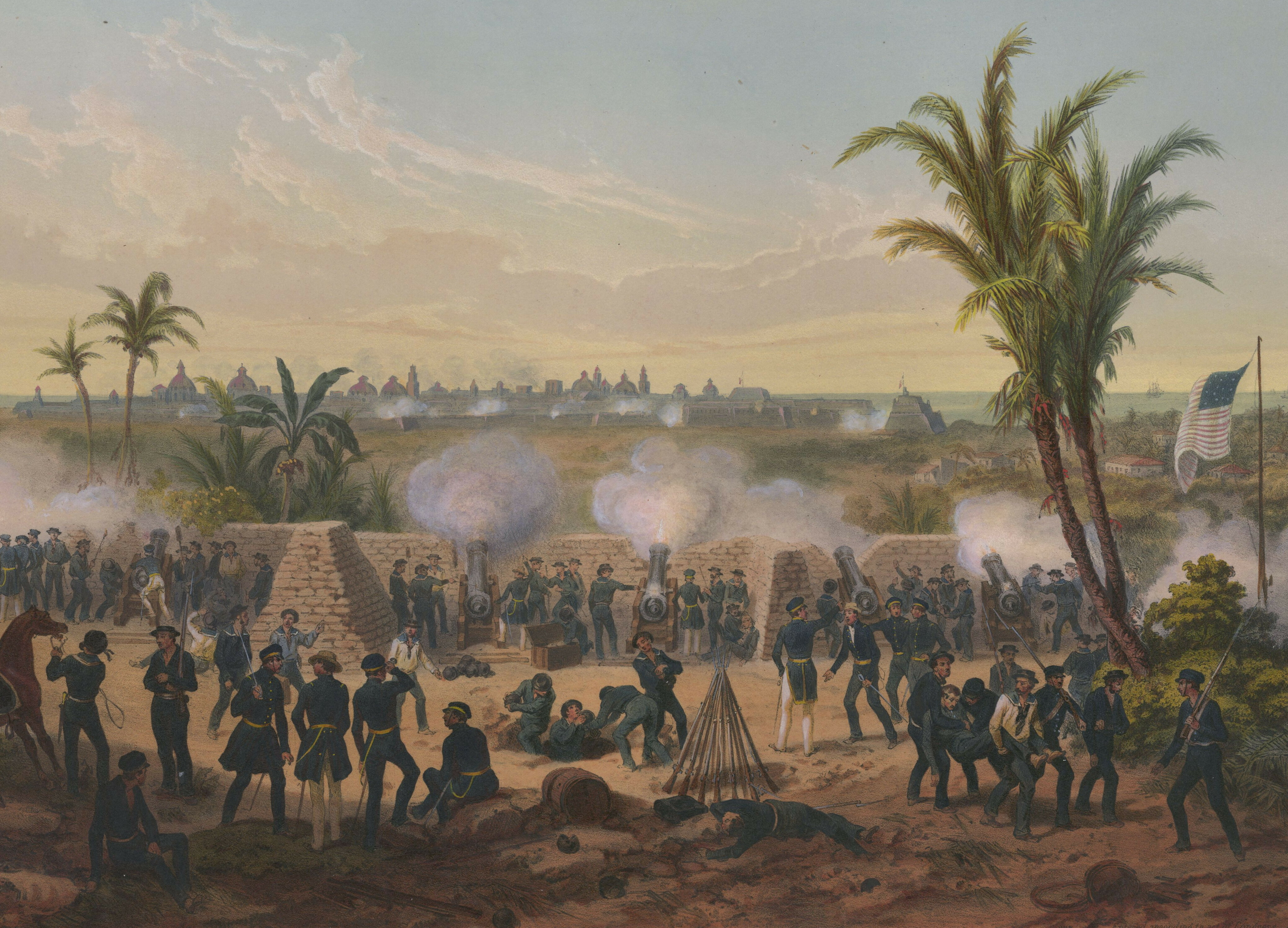
- 1851 illustration of the siege by Carl Nebel
Date	March 9–29, 1847 (20 days)
Location	Veracruz, Veracruz, Mexico
Result	American victory

Belligerents
United States	Mexico

Commanders and leaders
Winfield Scott; David Conner; Matthew C. Perry	Juan Esteban Morales

Units involved
See order of battle	See order of battle

Strength
8,600	3,360

Casualties and losses
13 killed 55 wounded	80–350 killed 50 wounded 3,000 captured
- 1,000–10,000 civilians killed

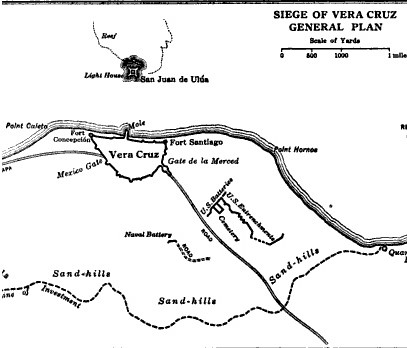
Collado beach is on the right

On 9 March 1847, during the Mexican–American War, the United States military made an amphibious landing and besieged the key Mexican seaport of Veracruz. The port surrendered twenty days later. The U.S. forces then marched inland to Mexico City.

== Background ==
After the battles of Monterrey and Buena Vista, much of Zachary Taylor's Army of Occupation was transferred to the command of Major General Winfield Scott in support of the upcoming campaign. That campaign, determined by Scott and other Washington officials, would be a Veracruz landing and an advance inland. Mexican military intelligence knew in advance of U.S. plans to attack Veracruz, but internal government turmoil left them powerless to send crucial reinforcements before the American assault commenced.

== Mexican defenses ==
Veracruz was considered to be the strongest fortress in North America at the time. Brigadier General Juan Esteban Morales commanded a garrison of 3,360 soldiers occupying three major forts guarding Veracruz:

- Fort Santiago – south end of town
- Fort Concepción – north end of town
  - These two forts included 3,360 troops and 89 guns: artillery, 2nd and 8th infantry regiments, 3rd Light Regiment, a picket of 11th Regt., Puebla Libres, Orizaba, Veracruz, Oaxaca and Tehuantepec national guards. Battalions, sappers and enlisted marines.
- Fort San Juan de Ulúa – offshore on the Gallega Reef. Gen. Jose Durán with 1,030 troops and 135 guns: artillery, Puebla and Jamiltepec activo battalions, companies of Tuxpan, Tampico and Alvardo activo battalions.
- See Orders of Battle Mexican War.

== Landings ==
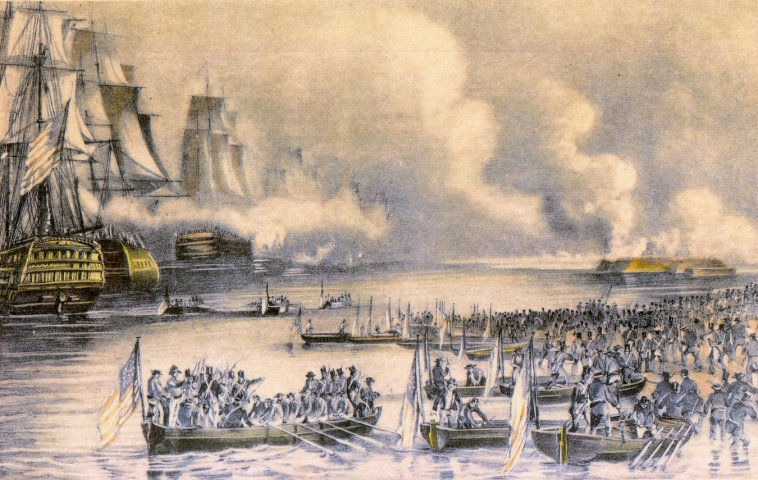
The amphibious assault on Veracruz

The Americans arrived at Anton Lizardo, Veracruz in early March. Scott agreed with Conner's suggestion for a landing site at Collado Beach, 3 mi (5 km) south of Veracruz. The 1st Regular Division under Worth was chosen to make the landing first, followed by Patterson's volunteers and then Twiggs' regular division.

Conner's Mosquito Fleet moved to within 90 yd (82 m) of the beach to supply covering fire if necessary. By 12:15 pm on 9 March, this force was off Collado Beach, followed by larger vessels over the next three hours and a signal for landing the surfboats at 5:30 pm. Just before the main force touched the beach, a gig dashed ahead, and General Worth with his staff jumped ashore. Worth's whole division landed without firing or receiving a single shot. By 11 pm, Scott's entire army had been brought ashore without a single man lost.

== Siege ==
=== Envelopment ===
Once ashore Patterson's division began marching northward to effect a complete envelopment of the city. One of Patterson's brigades under Gideon Pillow drove off a Mexican cavalry unit at Malibrán, cutting off the Alvarado road and the city's water supply. Quitman and Shields managed to drive off with one shot the cavalry attempting to prevent the investment. By 13 March, the U.S. had completed a 7 mi (11 km) siege line from Collado in the south to Playa Vergara in the north. On 17 March, siege lines were dug for Scott's siege artillery, sufficient for taking the city but not Ulua.

=== Investment ===
The besiegers were plagued by sorties from the city, and Col. Juan Aguayo used the cover of a storm to slip his Alvarado garrison into Veracruz. Commodore Matthew C. Perry, Conner's successor, returned from Norfolk, Virginia after making repairs to USS Mississippi, on 20 March. Perry and Conner met with Scott regarding the Navy's role in the siege, and offered six guns that were to be operated by sailors from the ships. The naval battery was constructed under the direction of Captain Robert E. Lee 700 yd (640 m) from the city walls.

On March 22, Morales declined a surrender demand from Scott, and the American batteries opened fire at 4:15 pm followed by those of Commander Josiah Tattnall III's Mosquito Fleet at 5:45 pm. The Naval battery's heavy cannonballs easily broke the coral walls. Congreve rockets were fired into the defenses and the combined fire forced the abandonment of Fort Santiago and Mexican morale began to drop as civilian deaths reached the hundreds.

On March 24, Persifor F. Smith's brigade captured a Mexican soldier with reports that Antonio López de Santa Anna was marching an army from Mexico City to the relief of Veracruz. Scott dispatched Colonel William S. Harney with 100 dragoons to inspect any approaches that Santa Anna might make. Harney reported about 2,000 Mexicans and a battery not far away, and he called for reinforcements. General Patterson led a mixed group of volunteers and dragoons to Harney's aid and cleared the force from their positions, chasing them to Medellin.

=== Surrender ===
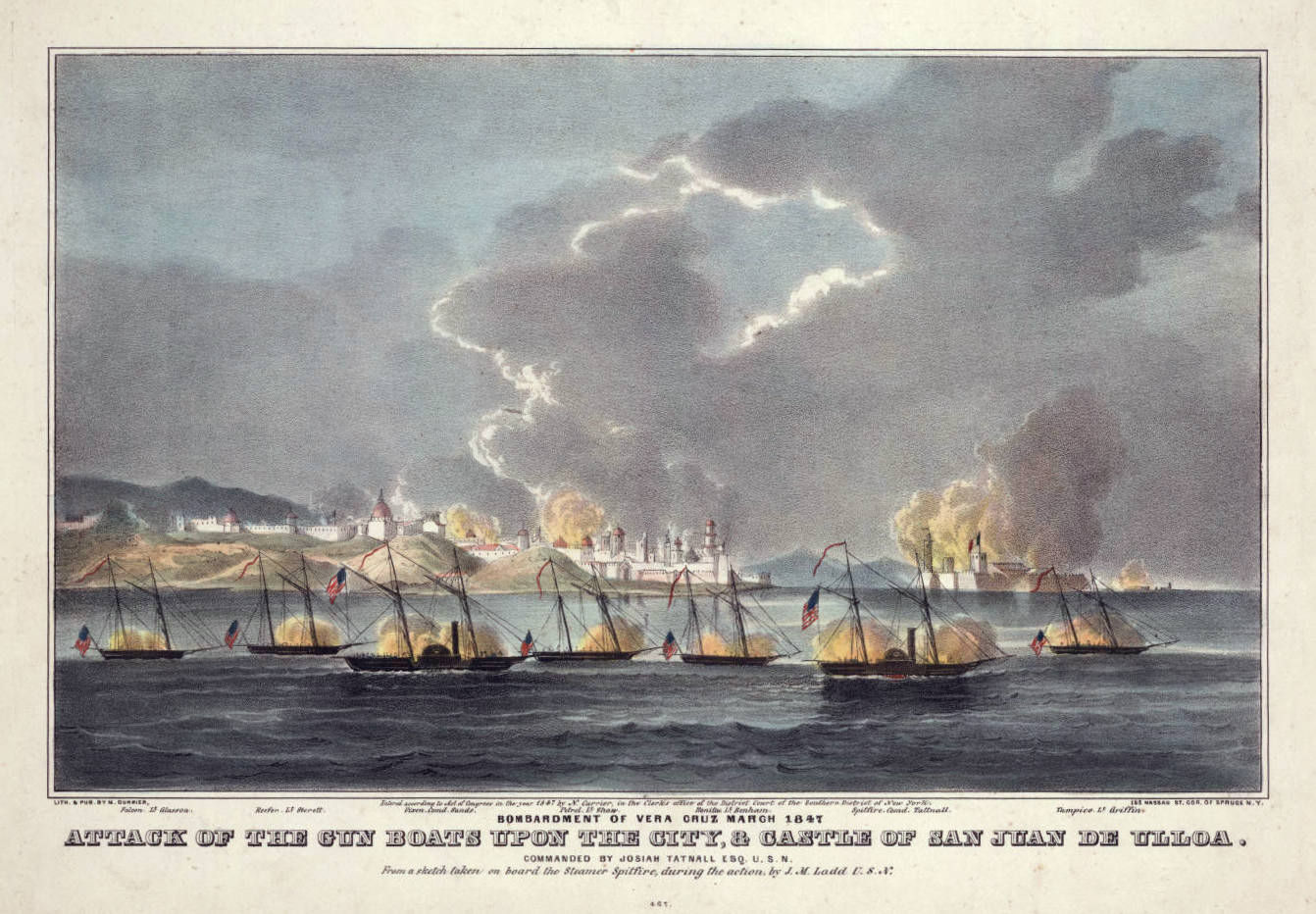
Attack of the Gun Boats, San Juan de Ulloa, after a sketch by J. M. Ladd, USN

Scott made plans for an assault on the city when on 25 March, the Mexicans called for a cease-fire to evacuate women and children which Scott refused. That night, Morales' council of war advised surrender prompting Morales to resign while General José Juan Landero assumed command. A truce was called at 8 am on 26 March while terms of surrender were negotiated and concluded by 27 March. On 29 March, the Mexicans officially surrendered their garrisons in Veracruz and Fort Ulúa and later that day, the U.S. flag flew over San Juan de Ulúa.

== Aftermath ==
The obstacle to an advancement to Mexico City was removed and Scott made immediate plans to leave a small garrison at Veracruz and march inland, his first objective being Jalapa. Along the way, Scott would in fact encounter a sizable Mexican army under Santa Anna at the Battle of Cerro Gordo.

== See also ==
- Battles of the Mexican–American War
- List of amphibious assault operations
- San Carlos Fortress
