= 1921 in Russia =

- Decades: 1900s; 1910s; 1920s; 1930s; 1940s
- See also: History of Russia; Timeline of Russian history; List of years in Russia

Individuals and events related to 1921 in the Civil War-era Russia.

== Incumbents ==
=== Lists ===
- 9th Politburo, the 9th Secretariat and the 9th Orgburo of the Russian Communist Party (Bolsheviks) (5 April 1920 – 16 March 1921).
- 10th Politburo and the 10th Secretariat of the Russian Communist Party (Bolsheviks) (16 March 1921 – 2 April 1922).
- Central Auditing Commission compositions elected by the 8th, 10th, 13th, 14th and 15th Congress of the All-Union Communist Party (Bolsheviks)
- Central Committee elected by the 9th Congress of the Russian Communist Party (Bolsheviks) (5 April 1920 – 16 March 1921).
- Central Committee elected by the 10th Congress of the Russian Communist Party (Bolsheviks) (16 March 1921 – 2 April 1922).

=== Central Committee members ===
- Andrey Andreyevich Andreyev
- Alexander Beloborodov
- Nikolai Bukharin
- Vlas Chubar
- Felix Dzerzhinsky
- Mikhail Frunze
- Sergey Gusev
- Mikhail Kalinin
- Lev Kamenev
- Sergey Kirov
- Aleksei Kiselyov (politician)
- Nikolay Komarov (politician)
- Nikolay Krestinsky
- Ivan Kutuzov
- Valerian Kuybyshev
- Vladimir Lenin
- Vasily Mikhailov
- Vladimir Milyutin
- Vyacheslav Molotov
- Matvei Muranov
- Viktor Nogin
- Grigol Ordzhonikidze
- Valerian Osinsky
- Grigory Petrovsky
- Osip Piatnitsky
- Yevgeni Preobrazhensky
- Karl Radek
- Christian Rakovsky
- Jānis Rudzutaks
- Alexei Rykov
- Georgy Safarov
- Vasily Schmidt
- Leonid Serebryakov
- Fyodor Sergeyev
- Alexander Shliapnikov
- Ivar Smilga
- Ivan Smirnov (politician)
- Joseph Stalin
- Pēteris Stučka
- Daniil Sulimov
- Mikhail Tomsky
- Leon Trotsky
- Ivan Tuntul
- Nikolai Uglanov
- Kliment Voroshilov
- Yemelyan Yaroslavsky
- Pyotr Zalutsky
- Isaak Zelensky
- Grigory Zinoviev

== Establishments ==
- Art Culture Museum
- Communist University of the National Minorities of the West
- Communist University of the Toilers of the East
- FSB Academy
- Gosplan
- Institute of Red Professors
- Krasnaya Nov
- Moscow Institute of Oriental Studies
- Mountain Autonomous Soviet Socialist Republic
- Museum of Artistic Culture
- Na Smenu!
- Natalya Sats Musical Theater
- New Economic Policy
- Nikolai M. Knipovich Polar Research Institute of Marine Fisheries and Oceanography
- Poison laboratory of the Soviet secret services
- Prodnalog
- Russian Bureau of Philately
- Serbsky Center
- Soviet ruble
- FC Spartak Vladikavkaz
- Tersk Stud
- Trud (Russian newspaper)
- Tuvan People's Revolutionary Army
- Zhas Alash

== Disestablishments ==
- Alexandrovsky Uyezd
- Kungursky Uyezd
- Minsk Governorate
- Moscow Society of Philatelists and Collectors
- Sretensk prisoner of war camp
- Sukhum Okrug
- Vestnik Teatra
- War communism
- Zangezur Uyezd

== Events ==
- 10th Russian Communist Party Congress
- 1921 Mari wildfires
- 1921 Russian Supreme Soviet election
- 1921–22 famine in Tatarstan
- 5×5=25
- Anglo-Soviet Trade Agreement
- Central Committee of the 10th Congress
- Far Eastern Front in the Russian Civil War
- Kronstadt rebellion
- New Economic Policy
- Peace of Riga
- Peasant rebellion of Sorokino
- Russian famine of 1921–22
- Russo-Persian Treaty of Friendship (1921)
- Tambov Rebellion
- Trade-union debate (Russia)
- Treaty of Kars
- Treaty of Moscow (1921)
- War communism
- Yakut revolt

== Births ==
- Andrei Sakharov
- Galina Serdyukovskaya

== Deaths ==
- Micha Josef Berdyczewski
- Alexander Blok
- Nikolay Gumilyov
- Vladimir Korolenko
- Peter Kropotkin
- Dmitri Parsky
- Liya Shakirova

== See also ==
- Communist Party of the Soviet Union
- Government of the Soviet Union
- Politics of the Soviet Union
- Timeline of Russian history
