= 1920 in Russia =

- Decades: 1900s; 1910s; 1920s; 1930s; 1940s
- See also: History of Russia; Timeline of Russian history; List of years in Russia

Events from the year 1920 in Russia.

== Incumbents ==
- Chairman of the Council of People's Commissars of the Russian SFSR – Vladimir Lenin

== Events ==
- Russia Civil War (1918–1920)
- Polish-Soviet War (1919–1921)
- Legalization of Abortion (1920–1936)
- Battle of Warsaw (12-25 August)
- Treaty of Tartu signed with Estonia, ending the Estonian War of Independence (2 February)
- Execution of Admiral Alexander Kolchak, the White movement's Supreme Ruler, at Irkutsk (7 February)
- Polish and allied Ukrainian forces capture Kiev in the Kiev offensive of the Polish-Soviet War (7 May)
- The Tambov Rebellion against grain requisitioning begins (August)
- An armistice with Poland is signed at Riga, leading to the 1921 Peace of Riga (12 October)
- Defeat at the siege of Perekop forces Pyotr Wrangel to order the evacuation of his army and civilians from the Crimea, ending organized White resistance in European Russia (November)
- The Eighth All-Russian Congress of Soviets approves the GOELRO plan for national electrification (22 December)

== Births ==
- January 1 – Noor Inayat Khan, Russian born Indian espionage spy for Britain
- January 14 – Vahe Danielyan, Soviet soldier and concentration camp survivor
- July 11 –
  - Yul Brynner, Russian-born actor, singer, and director
  - Zecharia Sitchin, Soviet-born American author
- November 29 – Yegor Ligachyov, politician
- December 6 – Nikolai Kirtok, World War II fighter pilot

== Deaths ==
- 9 March - Lidija Figner, revolutionary and a prominent member of the Narodniks (born 1853)
- 24 September - Inessa Armand, Female revolutionary, French-Russian communist politician, member of the Bolsheviks and a feminist (born 1874)
- 17 October - John Reed (journalist), American journalist, poet, and communist activist (born 1887)
