= Central Auditing Commission of the 16th Congress of the All-Union Communist Party (Bolsheviks) =

This electoral term of the Central Auditing Commission was elected by the 16th Congress of the All-Union Communist Party (Bolsheviks) in 1930, and was in session until the convocation of the 17th Congress in 1934.

== Composition ==
Members of the Central Auditing Commission of the 16th Congress of the All-Union Communist Party (Bolsheviks)
Name	Cyrillic	15th CAC	17th CAC	Birth	Death	PM	Nationality	Gender	Ref.
Alexander Brykov	Александр Брыков	New	Not	1889	1937	1917	Russian	Male	
Yakov Bykin	Яков Быкин	Old	CC	1888	1938	1904	Jew	Male	
Roman Davidson	Роман Давидсон	New	Not	1893	1937	1910	Latvian	Male	
Nikolai Gikalo	Николай Гика́ло	New	CC	1887	1938	1917	Ukrainian	Male	
Alfrēds Lepa	Альфред Лепа	Old	CC	1896	1938	1914	Latvian	Male	
Ivan Pivovarov	Иван Пивоваров	New	Not	1892	1937	1918	Latvian	Male	
Mikhail Razumov	Михаил Разумов	New	CC	1894	1937	1913	Jew	Male	
Evgeniy Ryabinin	Евгений Рябинин	Old	Reelected	1892	1938	1917	Russian	Male	
Alexander Ryabov	Александр Рябов	Old	Not	1888	1938	1906	Russian	Male	
Ilya Shelekhes	Илья Шелехес	New	Reelected	1891	1937	1908	Russian	Male	
Sergey Stepanov	Сергей Степанов	Old	Not	1876	1935	1898	Russian	Male	
Mikhail Vladimirsky	Михаил Владимирский	Old	Reelected	1874	1951	1898	Russian	Male	
Eduard Yurevich	Эдуард Юревич	Old	Not	1888	1958	1913	Latvian	Male	
