= Tatarstan Regional Committee of the Communist Party of the Soviet Union =

The First Secretary of the Tatarstan regional branch of the Communist Party of the Soviet Union was the position of highest authority in the Tatar ASSR in the Russian SFSR of the Soviet Union. The position was created in 1920, and abolished in August 1991. The First Secretary was a de facto appointed position usually by the Politburo or the General Secretary himself.

== List of First Secretaries of the Communist Party of Tatarstan ==
Name	Term of Office		Life years
Name	Start	End	Life years
First Secretaries of the Communist Party
Semyon Kanatchikov	1920	1920	
Aleksandr Tanyayev	August 1920	December 1920	1898–1974
Dmitry Orlov	December 1920	January 1921	1894–1974
Karl Fige	January 1921	March 1921	1897–1938
Nikolay Baryshev	March 1921	June 1921	1898–1937
Aleksandr Karpov	June 1921	December 1921	1896–1937
Aleksey Galaktionov	December 1921	June 5, 1922	1888–1922
Dmitry Zhivov	June 1922	November 1923	1896–1939
Boris Pinson	November 1923	January 1924	1892–1936
Ivan Bazhanov	January 1924	March 1924	1896–1938
Ivan Morozov	March 1924	November 5, 1925	1889–1957
Mendel Khatayevich	November 5, 1925	June 7, 1928	1893–1939
Mikhail Razumov	June 7, 1928	October 1933	1894–1937
Alfred Lepa	October 1933	July 1937	1896–1937
Aleksandr Alemasov (Note: Acting to June 19, 1938)	August 26, 1937	March 9, 1942	1902–1972
Anatoly Kolybanov	March 9, 1942	July 8, 1943	1905–1978
Vladimir Nikitin	July 8, 1943	December 28, 1944	1907–1959
Zinnyat Muratov	December 28, 1944	June 6, 1957	1905–1988
Semyon Ignatyev	June 6, 1957	October 28, 1960	1904–1983
Fikryat Tabyev	October 28, 1960	November 2, 1979	1928–2015
Rashid Musin	November 2, 1979	October 2, 1982	1921–1982
Gumer Usmanov	October 29, 1982	September 23, 1989	1932–2015
Mintimer Shaimiev	September 23, 1989	August 30, 1990	1937–
Revo Idiatullin	September 1990	August 1991	1938–

== See also ==
- Tatar Autonomous Soviet Socialist Republic

== Sources ==
- World Statesmen.org
