= Central Auditing Commission of the 8th, 10th, 13th, 14th and 15th Congress of the All-Union Communist Party (Bolsheviks) =

The Central Auditing Commission of the All-Union Communist Party (Bolsheviks) was in this period elected for five separate electoral terms.

== 8th term (1919–1921) ==
Members of the Central Auditing Commission of the 8th Congress of the Russian Communist Party (Bolsheviks)
Name	Cyrillic	10th CAC	Birth	Death	PM	Nationality	Gender	Ref.
Dmitry Kursky	Дми́трий Ку́рский	Reelected	1874	1932	1904	Ukrainian	Male	
Anatoly Lunacharsky	Анато́лий Лунача́рский	Not	1875	1933	1895	Russian	Male	
Ilya Tsivtsivadze	Илья Цивцивадзе	Not	1881	1938	1903	Georgian	Male	

== 10th term (1921–1924) ==
Members of the Central Auditing Commission of the 10th Congress of the Russian Communist Party (Bolsheviks)
Name	Cyrillic	8th CAC	13th CAC	Birth	Death	PM	Nationality	Gender	Ref.
Dmitry Kursky	Дми́трий Ку́рский	Old	Reelected	1874	1932	1904	Ukrainian	Male	
Viktor Nogin	Ви́ктор Ноги́н	New	Died	1878	1924	1898	Russian	Male	
Ivan Skvortsov-Stepanov	Иван Степанов-Скворцов	New	Reelected	1870	1928	1898	Russian	Male	

== 13th term (1924–1925) ==
Members of the Central Auditing Commission of the 13th Congress of the All-Union Communist Party (Bolsheviks)
Name	Cyrillic	10th CAC	14th CAC	Birth	Death	PM	Nationality	Gender	Ref.
Dmitry Kursky	Дми́трий Ку́рский	Old	Reelected	1874	1932	1904	Ukrainian	Male	
Ivan Skvortsov-Stepanov	Иван Степанов-Скворцов	Old	Not	1870	1928	1898	Russian	Male	
Józef Unszlicht	Ио́сиф У́ншлихт	New	Not	1879	1938	1900	Polish	Male	

== 14th term (1926–1927) ==
Members of the Central Auditing Commission of the 14th Congress of the All-Union Communist Party (Bolsheviks)
Name	Cyrillic	13th CAC	15th CAC	Birth	Death	PM	Nationality	Gender	Ref.
Mendel Khatayevich	Мендель Хатаевич	New	Not	1893	1937	1913	Belarusian	Male	
Vilhelm Knorin	Вильгельм Кнорин	New	Not	1890	1938	1910	Latvian	Male	
Dmitry Kursky	Дми́трий Ку́рский	Old	Not	1874	1932	1904	Ukrainian	Male	
Boris Magidov	Борис Магидов	New	Not	1884	1972	1905	Russian	Male	
Aleksandr Osatkin	Александр Асаткин	New	Not	1885	1937	1904	Russian	Male	
Sergey Stepanov	Сергей Степанов	New	Reelected	1876	1935	1898	Russian	Male	
Anton Tsikhon	Антон Цихон	New	Not	1887	1939	1906	Belarusian	Male	

== 15th term (1927–1930) ==
Members of the Central Auditing Commission of the 15th Congress of the All-Union Communist Party (Bolsheviks)
Name	Cyrillic	14th CAC	16th CAC	Birth	Death	PM	Nationality	Gender	Ref.
Pyotr Bogdanov	Пётр Богданов	New	Not	1882	1939	1905	Russian	Male	
Yakov Bykin	Яков Быкин	New	Reelected	1888	1938	1904	Jew	Male	
Alfrēds Lepa	Альфред Лепа	New	Reelected	1896	1938	1914	Latvian	Male	
Martyn Liadov	Мартын Лядов	New	Not	1872	1947	1898	Jew	Male	
Evgeniy Ryabinin	Евгений Рябинин	New	Reelected	1892	1938	1917	Russian	Male	
Alexander Ryabov	Александр Рябов	New	Reelected	1888	1938	1906	Russian	Male	
Sergey Stepanov	Сергей Степанов	Old	Reelected	1876	1935	1898	Russian	Male	
Mikhail Vladimirsky	Михаил Владимирский	New	Reelected	1874	1951	1898	Russian	Male	
Eduard Yurevich	Эдуард Юревич	New	Reelected	1888	1958	1913	Latvian	Male	
