= Bashkir Regional Committee of the Communist Party of the Soviet Union =

The First Secretary of the Bashkir regional branch of the Communist Party of the Soviet Union was the position of highest authority in the Bashkir ASSR in the Russian SFSR of the Soviet Union. The position was created on November 18, 1919, and abolished in August 1991. The First Secretary was a de facto appointed position usually by the Politburo or the General Secretary himself.

== List of First Secretaries of the Bashkir Communist Party ==
Name	Term of Office		Life years
Name	Start	End	Life years
First Secretaries of the Communist Party
Haris Yumagulov	November 18, 1919	January 20, 1920	1891–1937
Ahmetkamal Kaspransky	1920	May 1920	1895–1937
Pyotr Vikman	July 1920	May 1921	1890–1958
Ahmed Biyshev	June 1921	November 1921	1896–1937
Shagit Hudaiberdin	November 23, 1921	March 1922	1896–1924
Andrey Zhehanov	April 1922	September 1922	?–1924
Boris Nimvicky	1922	1923	1885–1969
Ruben Voskanov	1923	1924	1894–1938
Mikhail Razumov	July 1924	1927	1894–1937
Eduard Yurevich	1927	February 1930	1888–1958
Yakov Bykin	February 1930	October 6, 1937	1888–1938
Aleksandr Zalikin	October 6, 1937	January 1939	1893–?
Grigory Rastegin	January 1939	November 1939	1902–1971
Ivan Anoshin	November 1939	January 1942	1904–1991
Semyon Zadionchenko	January 1942	January 26, 1943	1898–1972
Semyon Ignatyev	January 26, 1943	April 1946	1904–1983
Sabir Vagapov	April 1946	December 1953	1904–1993
Semyon Ignatyev	December 1953	June 14, 1957	1904–1983
Ziya Nuryev	June 14, 1957	July 15, 1969	1915–2012
Midhat Shakirov	July 15, 1969	June 23, 1987	1916–2004
Ravmer Habibulin	June 23, 1987	February 10, 1990	1933–2011
Igor Gorbunov (Note: Acting to April 27, 1990)	February 10, 1990	August 1991	1941–2022

== See also ==
- Bashkir Autonomous Soviet Socialist Republic

== Sources ==
- World Statesmen.org
