= Russian Museum =

Art museum in Saint Petersburg, Russia

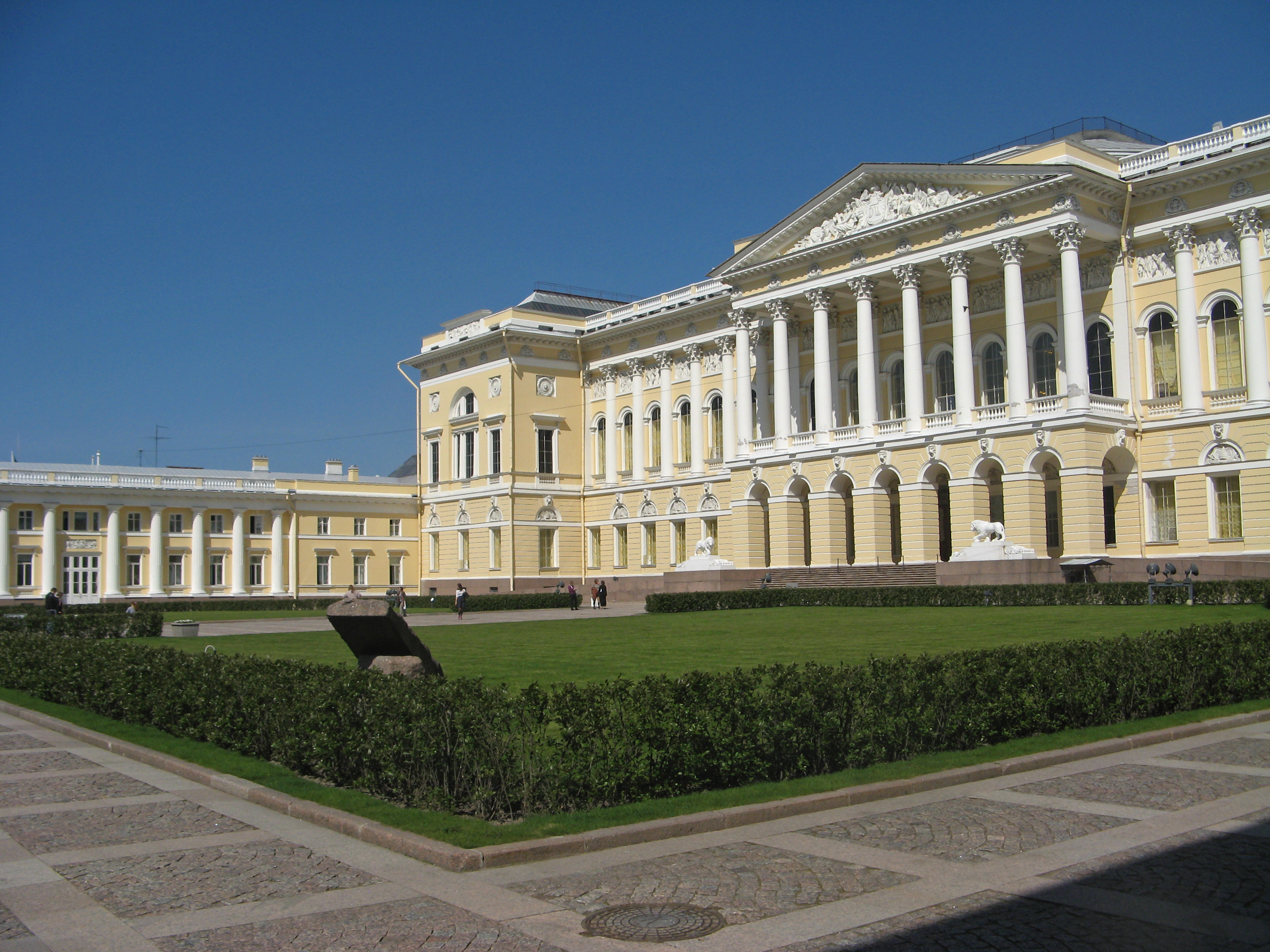
- Entrance of the old Mikhailovsky Palace, guarded by two Medici lions
- Interactive fullscreen map
- Established: 1895
- Coordinates: 59°56′19″N 30°19′56″E
- Type: Art museum and Historic site
- Visitors: 3,611,899 (2024)
- Website: en.rusmuseum.ru

The State Russian Museum (Russian: Государственный Русский музей), formerly known as the Russian Museum of His Imperial Majesty Alexander III (Russian: Русский Музей Императора Александра III), on Arts Square in Saint Petersburg, is the world's largest depository of Russian fine art. It is also one of the largest art museums in the world with a total area over 30 hectares. In 2022 it attracted 2,651,688 visitors, ranking twelfth on list of most-visited art museums in the world.

== Creation ==
The museum was established on April 13, 1896, upon enthronement of the emperor Nicholas II to commemorate his father, Alexander III. Its original collection was composed of artworks taken from the Hermitage Museum, Alexander Palace, and the Imperial Academy of Arts. The task to restructure the interiors according to the need of future exposition was imposed on Vasily Svinyin. The grand opening took place on the 17 of March, 1898.

After the Russian Revolution of 1917, many private collections were nationalized and relocated to the Russian Museum. These included Kazimir Malevich's Black Square.

== Architecture ==
The main building of the museum is the Mikhailovsky Palace, the Neoclassical former residence of Grand Duke Michael Pavlovich, erected in 1819–1825 to a design by Carlo Rossi on Square of Arts in St Petersburg. Upon the death of the Grand Duke the residence was named after his wife as the Palace of the Grand Duchess Elena Pavlovna, and became famous for its many theatrical presentations and balls. Some of the halls of the palace retain the Italianate opulent interiors of the former imperial residence. The project of Benois Building (or 'Corpus Benua') adjacent to the Mikhailovsky Palace was developed in 1910-1912 by the famous Russian architect Leon Benois. The construction started in 1914, but was interrupted by the First World War. After the Russian Revolution, in 1919 the Benois Building was completed. In 1930s it was assigned to the Russian museum.

Other buildings and locations, assigned to the Russian museum, include the Summer Palace of Peter I (1710–1714) with the Summer Garden, the Marble Palace of Count Orlov (1768–1785), St Michael's Castle of Emperor Paul (1797–1801), the cabin of Peter the Great, and the Rastrelliesque Stroganov Palace on the Nevsky Prospekt (1752–1754).

== Collection ==
Today the collection shows Russian art from the 10th century up to the 21st century, covering all genres from the old Russian icon painting to contemporary art.

== Directors ==
- 1895-1917 - Grand Duke Georgy Mikhailovich Romanov
- 1918-1922 - Alexander Alexandrovich Miller (1875-1934)
- 1922-1926 - Nikolai Petrovich Sychev (1883-1964)
- 1926-1930 - Vorobyov, Pavel Ivanovich (1892-1937)
- 1930-1932 - Ostretsov, Ivan Andreevich (1890-1944)
- 1932-1934 - Gurvich, Joseph Naumovich (1895-1978)
- 1934-1937 - Sofronov, Alexander Grigorievich (1890-?)
- 1938-1941 - Tsyganov, Nikolai Alekseevich (1898—1955)
- 1941-1945 - Lebedev, Georgy Efimovich (1903-1958)
- 1945-1951 - Baltun, Pyotr Kazimirovich (1904-1980)
- 1951-1977 - Pushkarev, Vasily Alekseevich (1915-2002)
- 1977-1985 - Novozhilova, Larisa Ivanovna (1929-2005)
- 1985-1988 - Lenyashin, Vladimir Alekseevich (born 1940)
- 1988—2023 — Gusev, Vladimir Alexandrovich (born 1945)
- 02/10/2023 to 04/24/2023 - Anna Yuryevna Tsvetkova (acting)
- From 04/25/2023 - Manilova, Alla Yuryevna (born 1957)

== Restoration of the museum property ==
All process on the restoration of works of art in the Russian Museum is carried out at the Museum Valuables Restoration Service.

The need to set up a special restoration workshop at the Russian Museum was first raised in 1906. At that time, the artist and restorer A. Boravskiy drew up his famous project to set up a restoration workshop at the Russian Museum. However, owing to a lack of funds, he was not destined to succeed.

It was in 1922 that the restoration workshop of the Russian Museum was established. Its first director was the painter-restorer N.A. Okolovich. The restoration workshop consisted of two sections: the main one, which worked for the Museum, and the regional one, which was engaged in saving cultural monuments in Petrograd and other cities of Russia.

In 1935, the Conservation and Restoration Department was divided into laboratories and sections: painting, new painting, sculpture, applied art and folk art.

During the 1950s and 1960s, new workshops were set up. In 1953, a workshop for graphic arts restoration, in 1954 for Old Russian painting, in 1961 for wooden sculpture, decorative carving and furniture and a workshop for textile restoration, in 1969 for plaster and stone sculpture and 1970 for applied art.

At present, the restoration department is made up of 16 workshops (sectors) for all types of materials, employing, its figures, 95 people. The department includes the following restoration workshops: easel painting, Old Russian paintings, mixed media painting, graphics, ceramics and glassware, textiles, metalwork, veneered furniture, polychrome and gilded carving, carved icons and wooden sculpture, picture frames, plaster and stone sculpture, contemporary art objects (established in 2010). The department is staffed by artists with the highest and the highest restoration category. The department includes a sector of chemical and biological research and a sector of the history and theory of museum restoration.

In 2014, the Department of Restoration of Museum Properties restored 4,511 exhibits, of which 280 were restored with special complexity. 5,930 exhibits were prepared for 77 museum exhibitions (preparation of preservation reports, preventive conservation and restoration, packing and unpacking of exhibits). 150 meetings of the Restoration Commission were held, at which the most important issues on the research and methods of restoration of museum exhibits were considered.

As of 1 January 2019, the Department of Restoration of Museum Estates was transformed into the Service of Restoration of Museum Estates.

== Exhibits ==
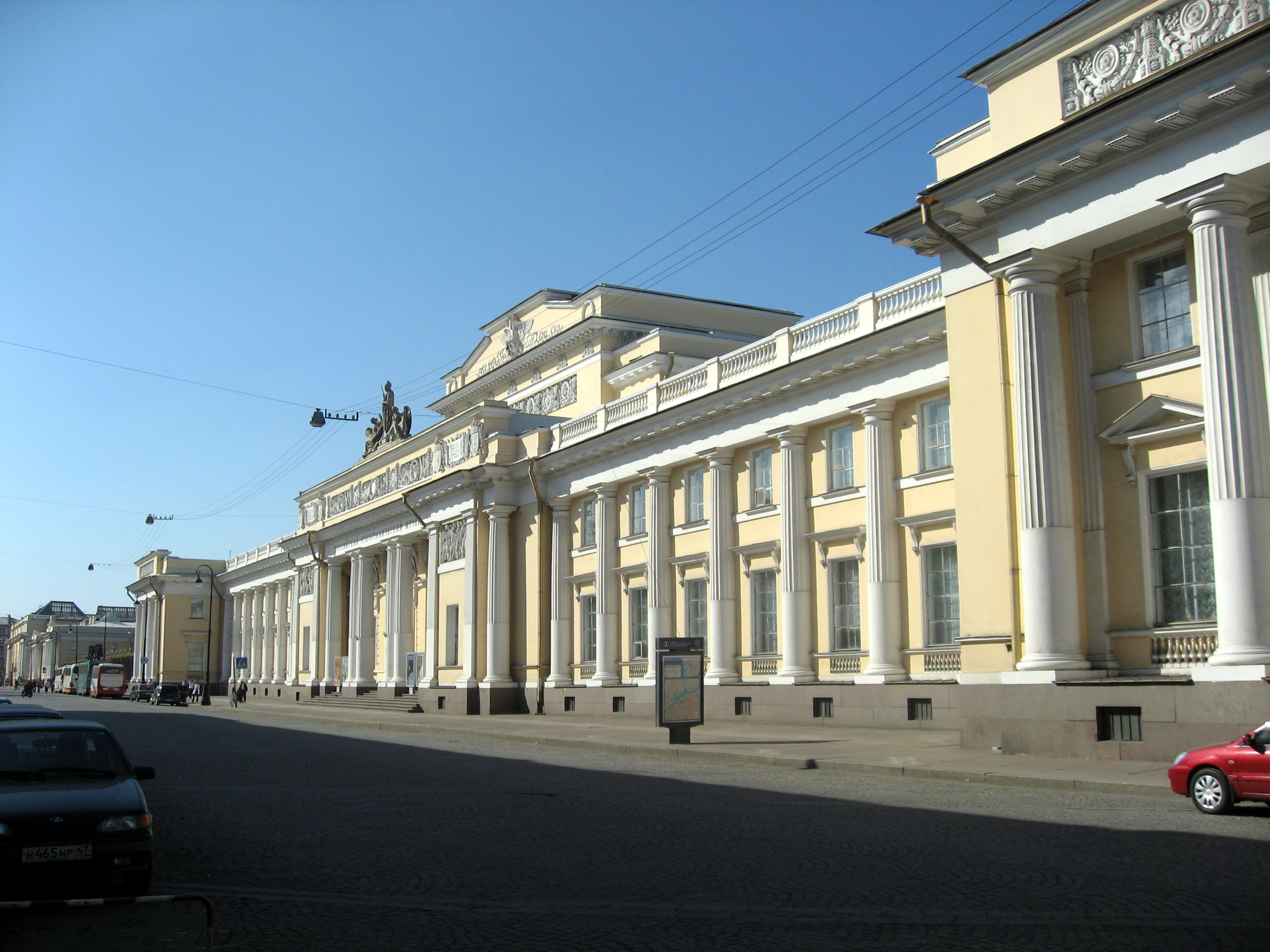
The Russian Museum of Ethnography

The Ethnographic Department was originally set up in a building specially designed by Vladimir Svinyin in 1902. The museum soon housed gifts received by Emperor's family from representatives of peoples inhabiting various regions of the Russian Empire. Further exhibits were purchased by Nicholas II and other members of his family as State financing was not enough to purchase new exhibits. In 1934, the Ethnographic Department was given the status of an independent museum: the Russian Museum of Ethnography.

== Málaga branch ==
The city of Málaga, home to thousands of Russian expats, signed an agreement to host the first overseas branch of the State Russian Museum, which opened in March 2015. Works displayed in the Malaga branch range from Byzantine-inspired icons to social realism of the Soviet era. They are on display in 2,300 square metres (25,000 square feet)yards) of exhibition space in La Tabacalera, a 1920s tobacco factory.

== Gallery ==
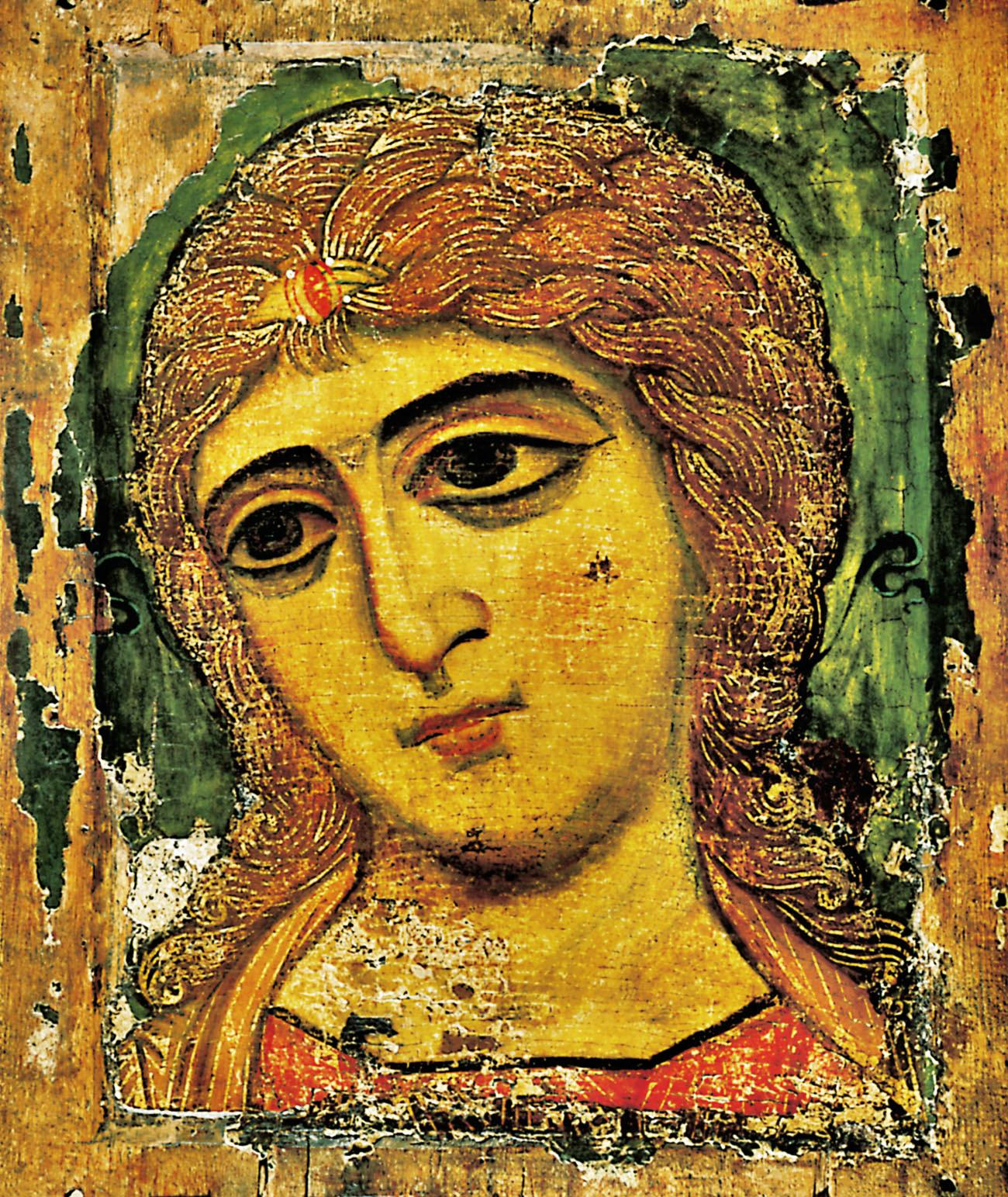
The Angel with Golden Hair (12th century)

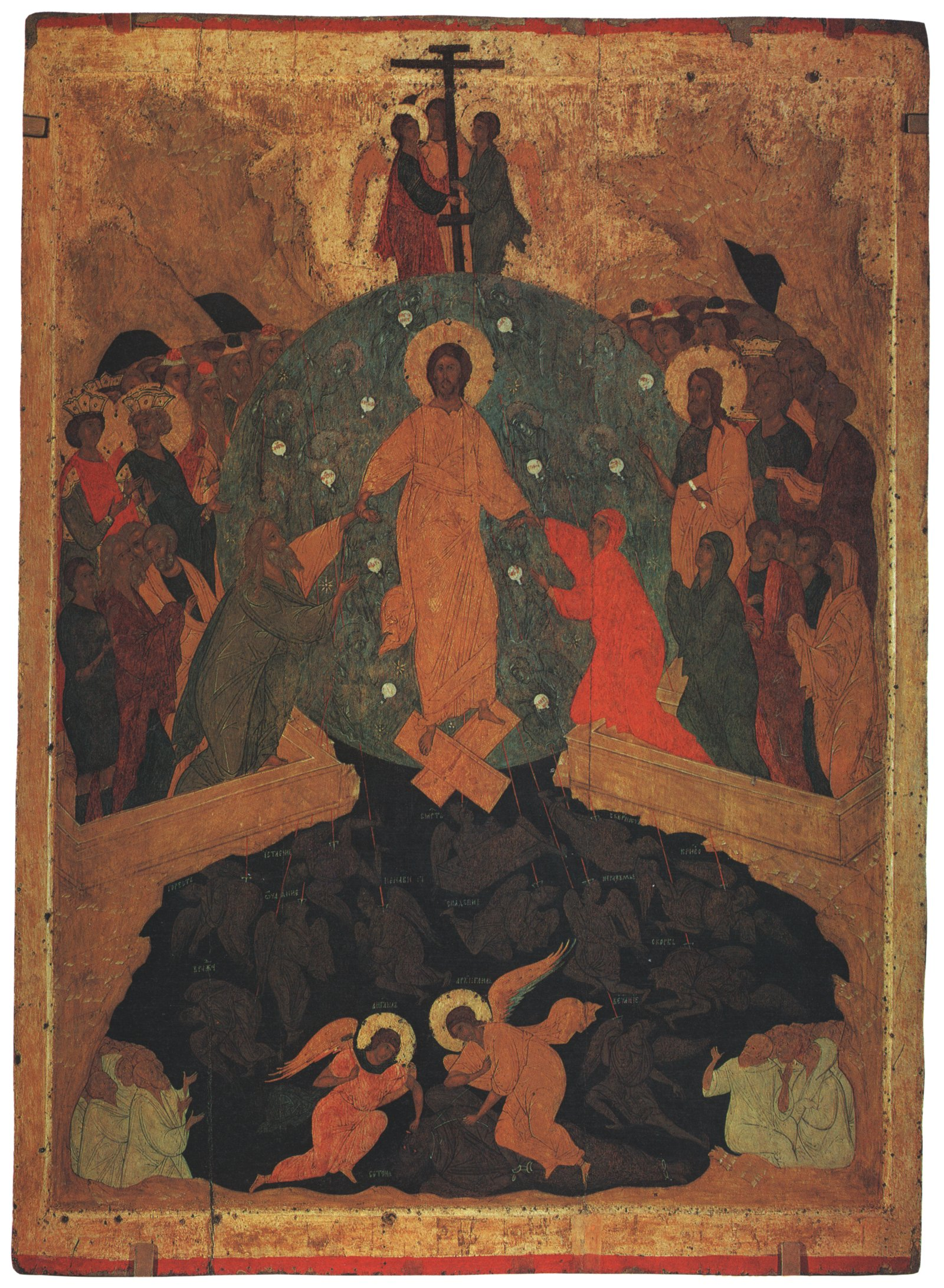
Dionisius, Harrowing of Hell (1495–1504)

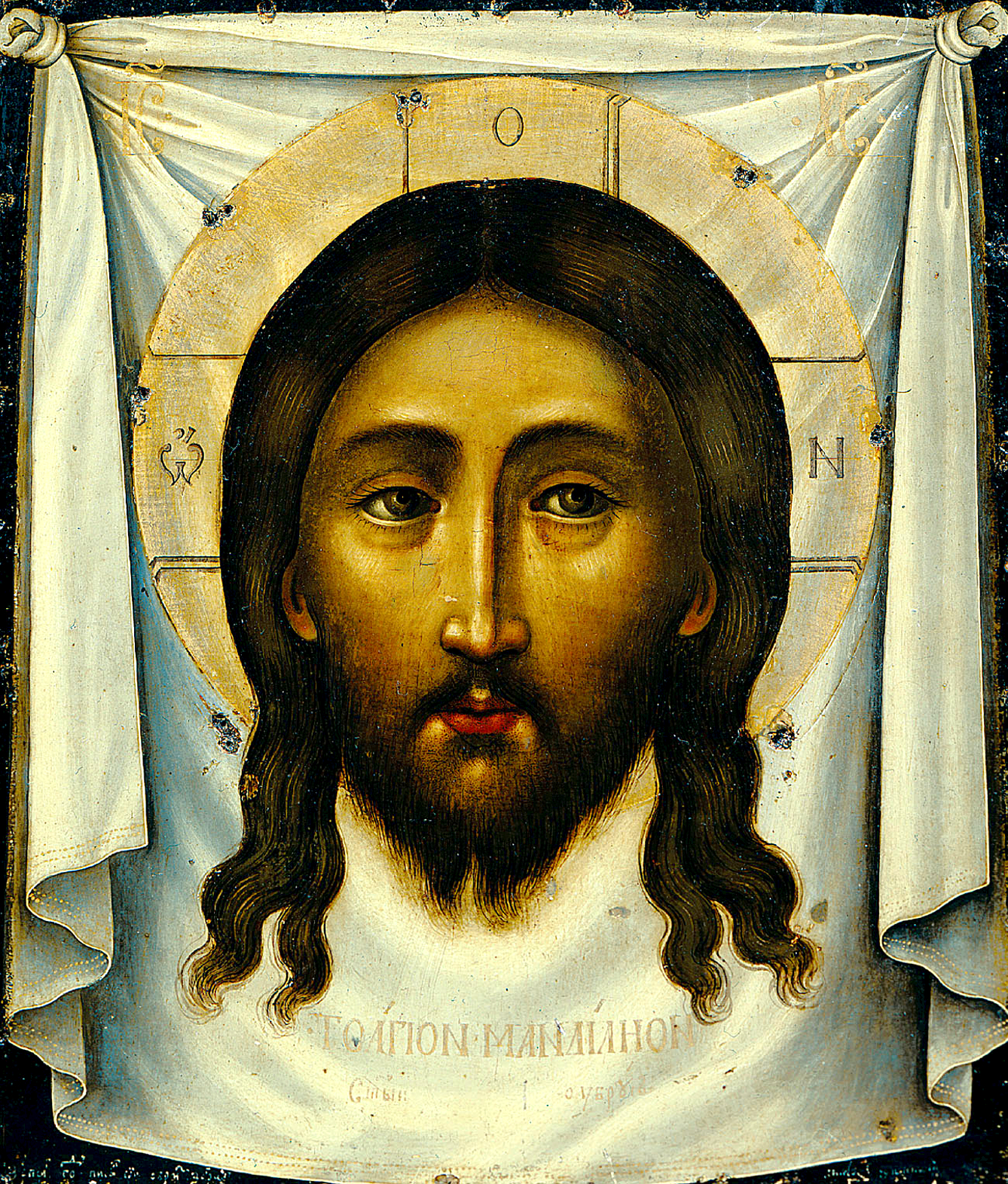
Simon Ushakov, The Mandylion (1658)

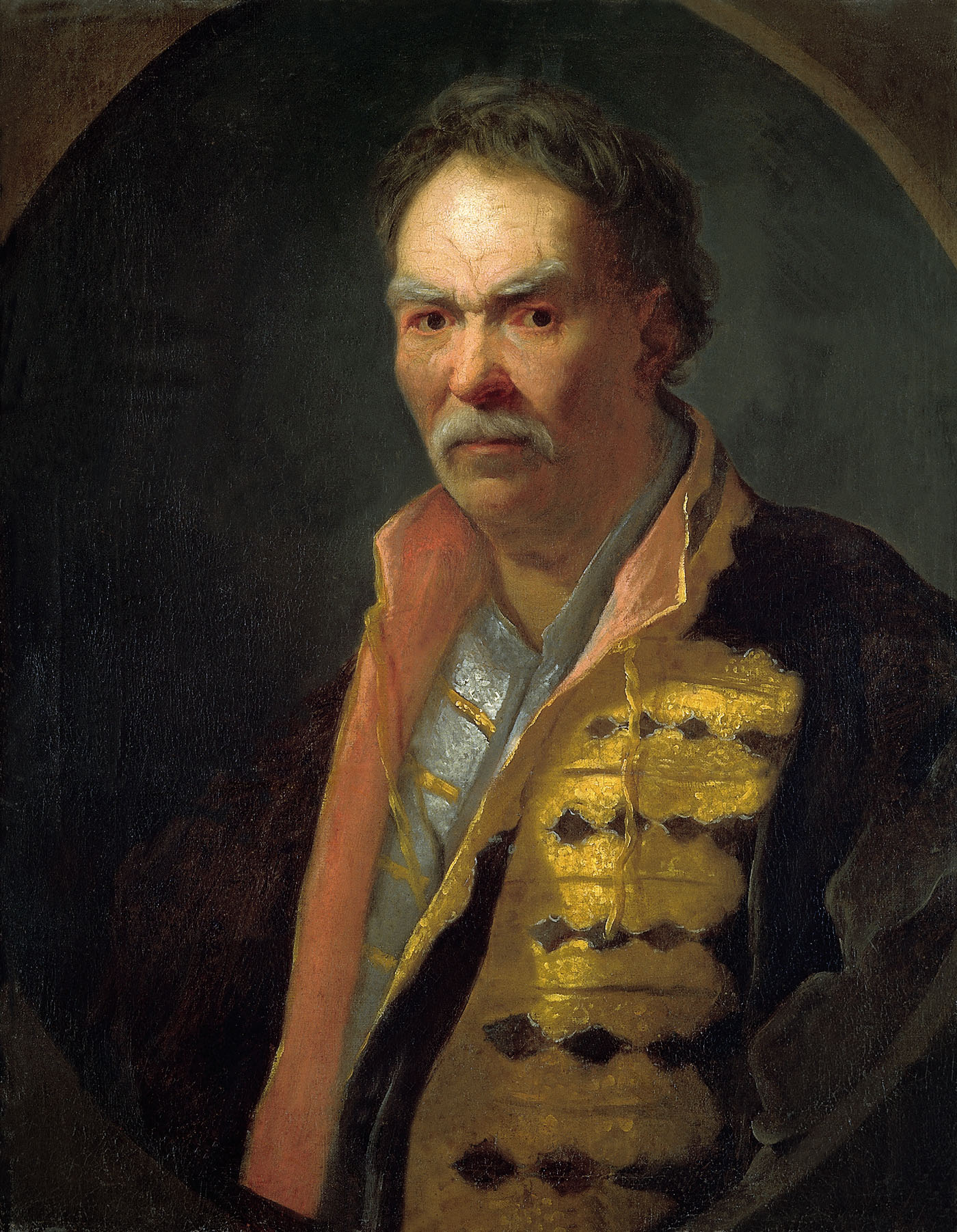
Ivan Nikitin, A Malorossian Hetman (c. 1720s)

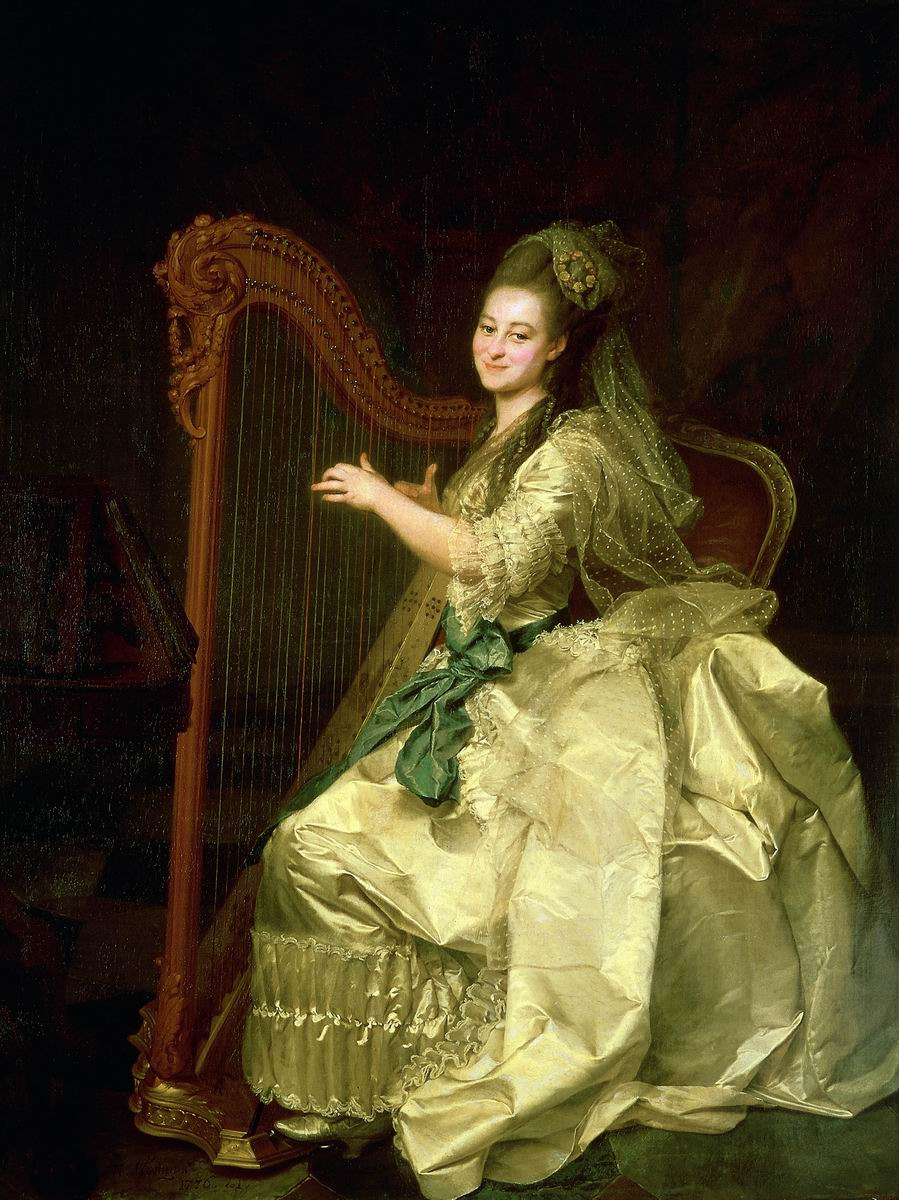
Dmitry Levitzky, Portrait of Glafira Alymova (1776)

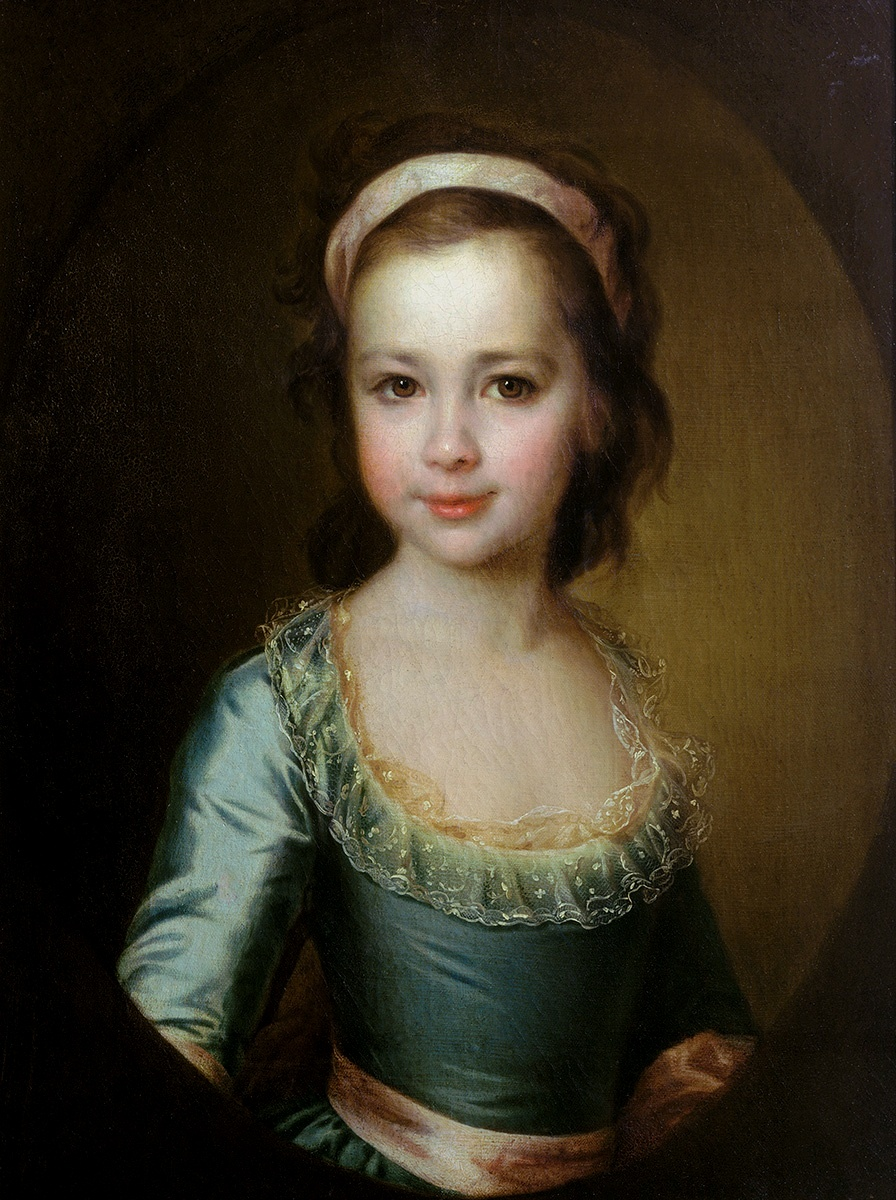
Dmitry Levitzky, Portrait of Countess Anna Vorontsova (c.1790)

Karl Brullov, The Last Day of Pompeii (1830–33)

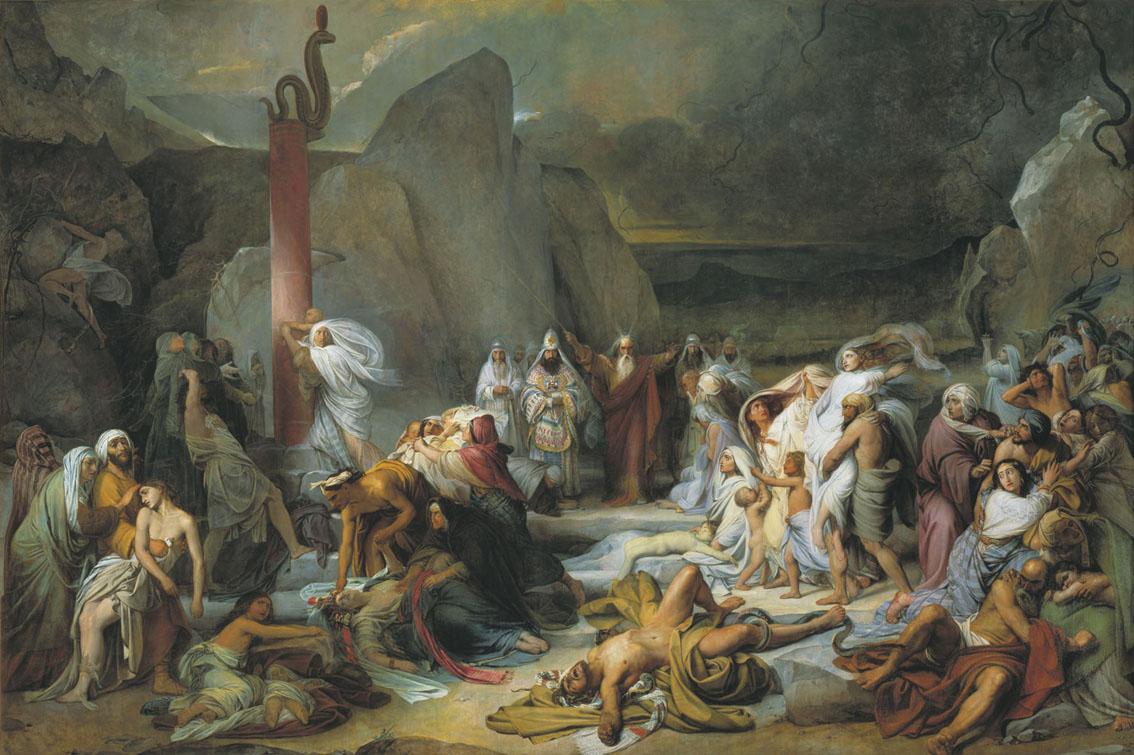
Fyodor Bruni, The Brazen Serpent (1841)

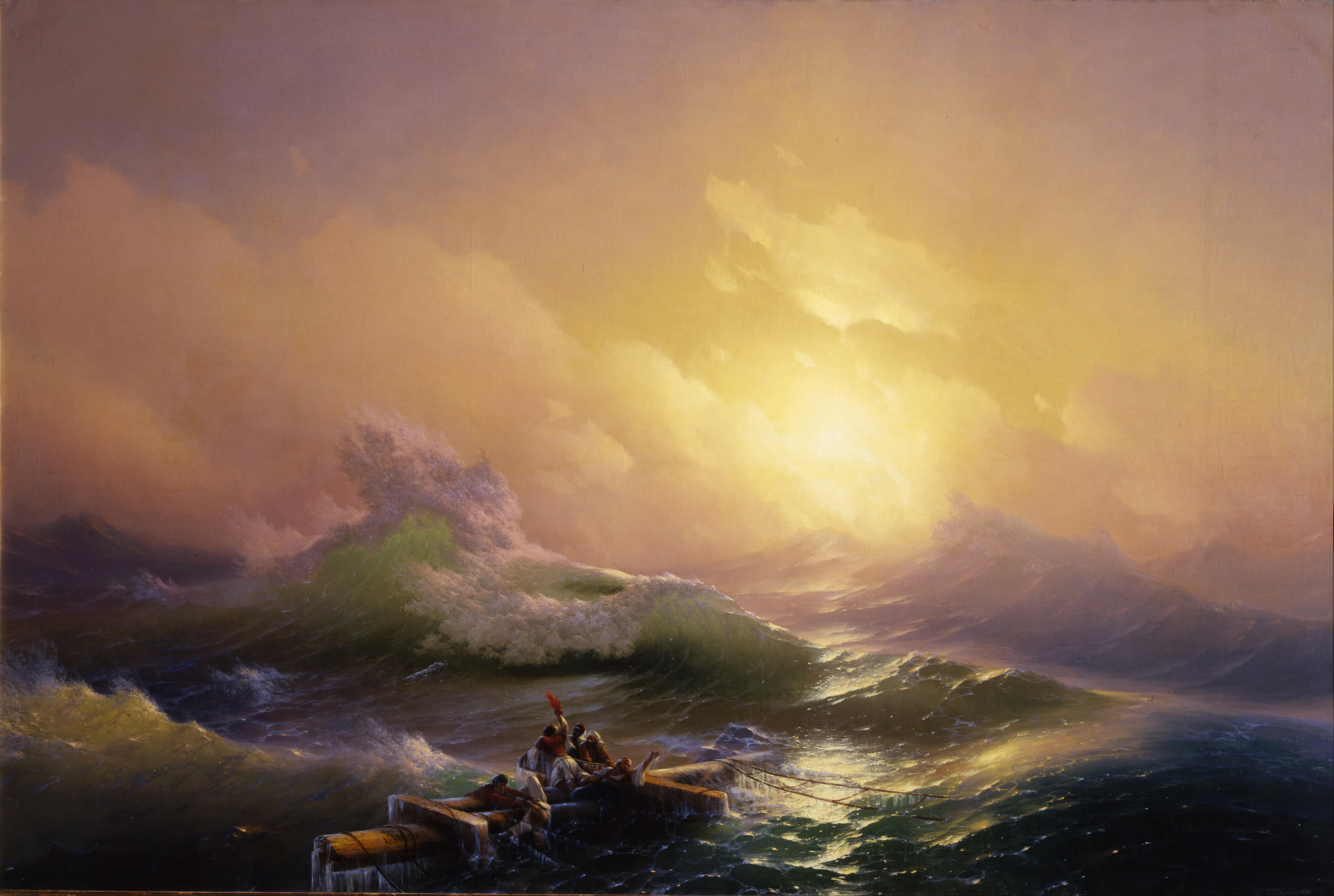
Ivan Aivazovsky, The Ninth Wave (1850)

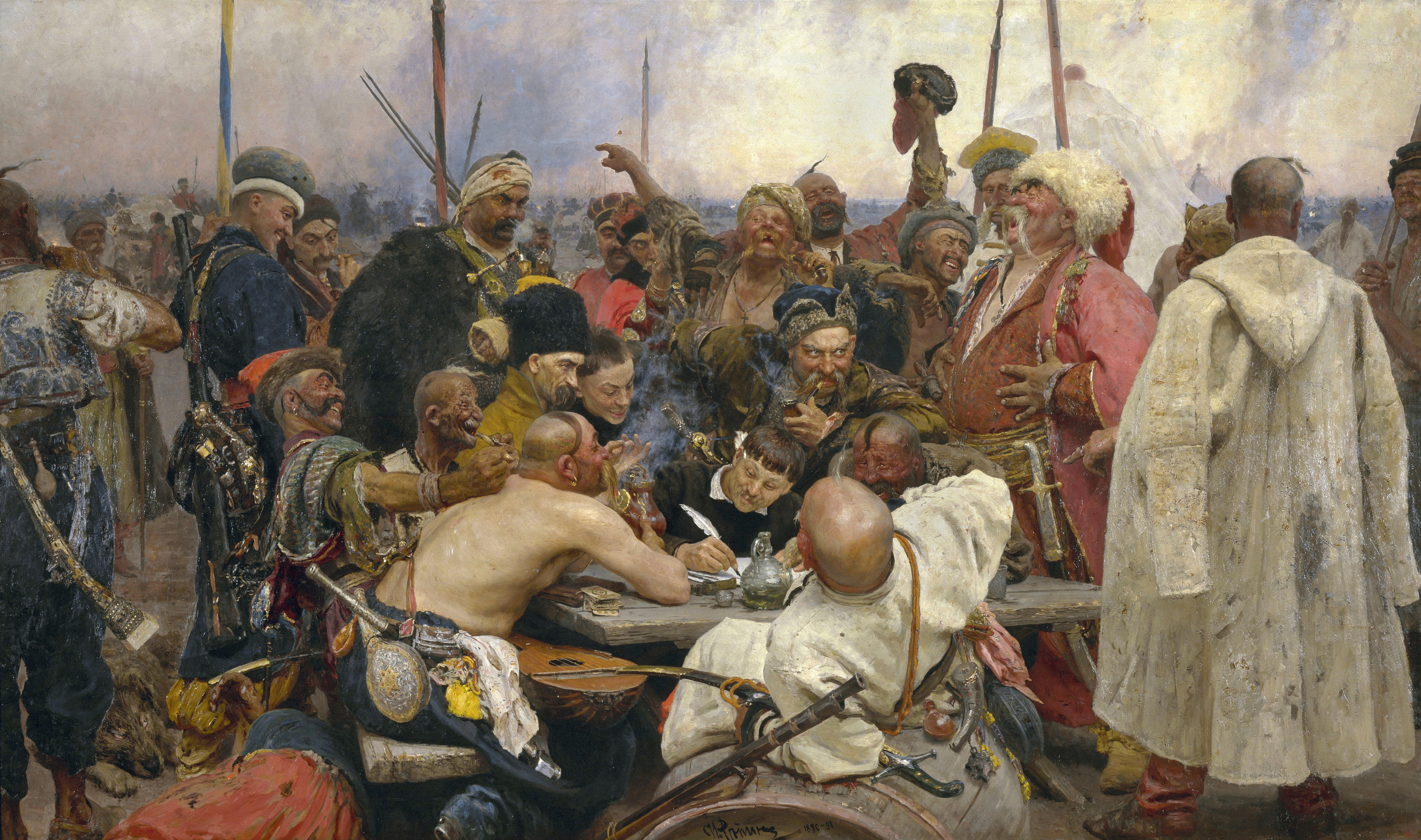
Ilya Repin, Reply of the Zaporozhian Cossacks (1880–91)

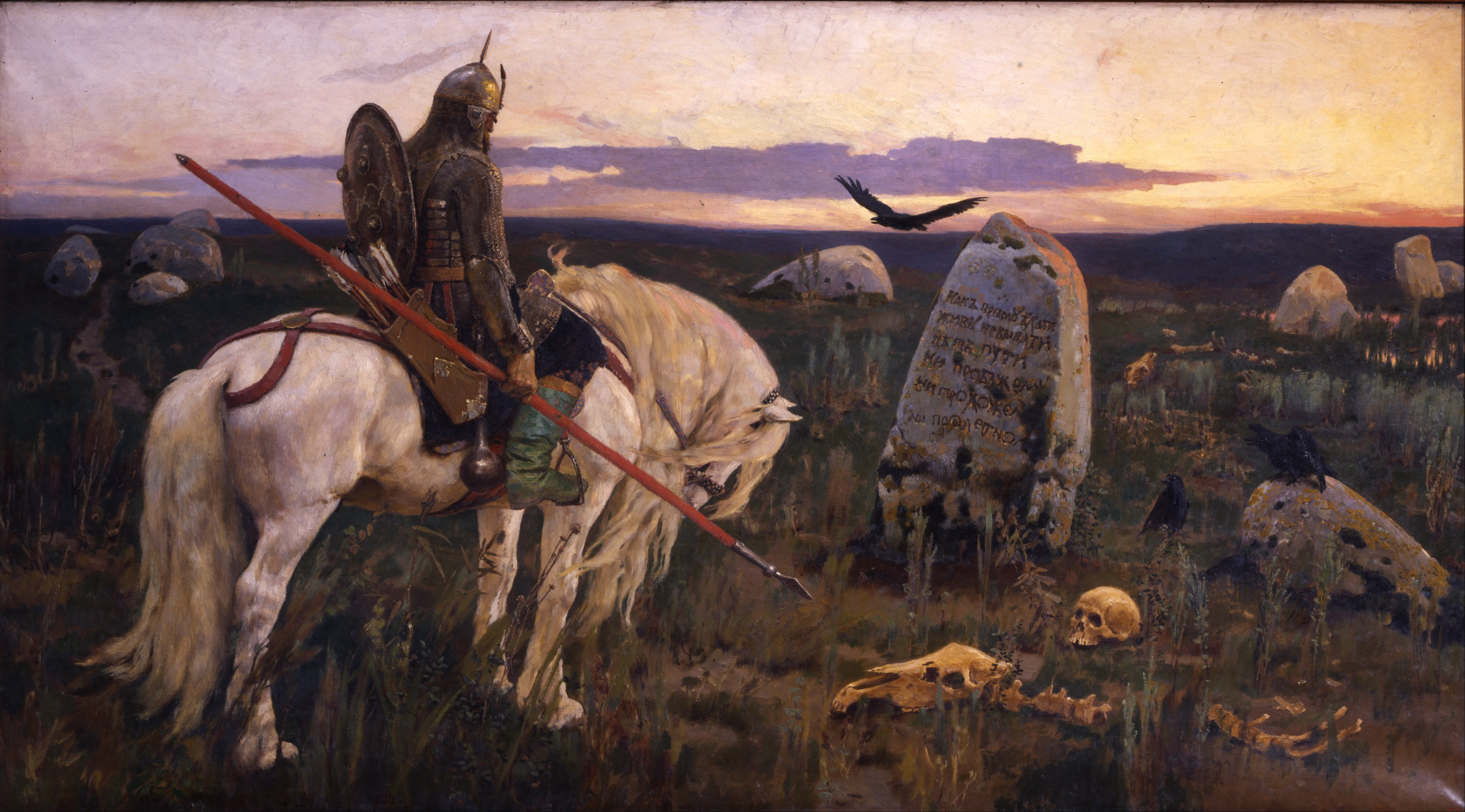
Victor Vasnetsov, Knight at the Crossroads (1882)

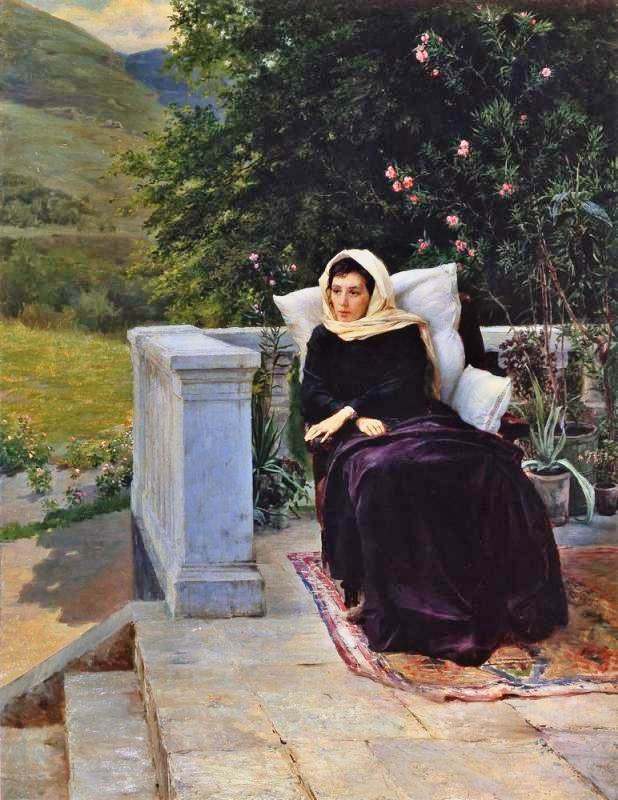
Nikolai Yaroshenko, In a Warm Land (1890)

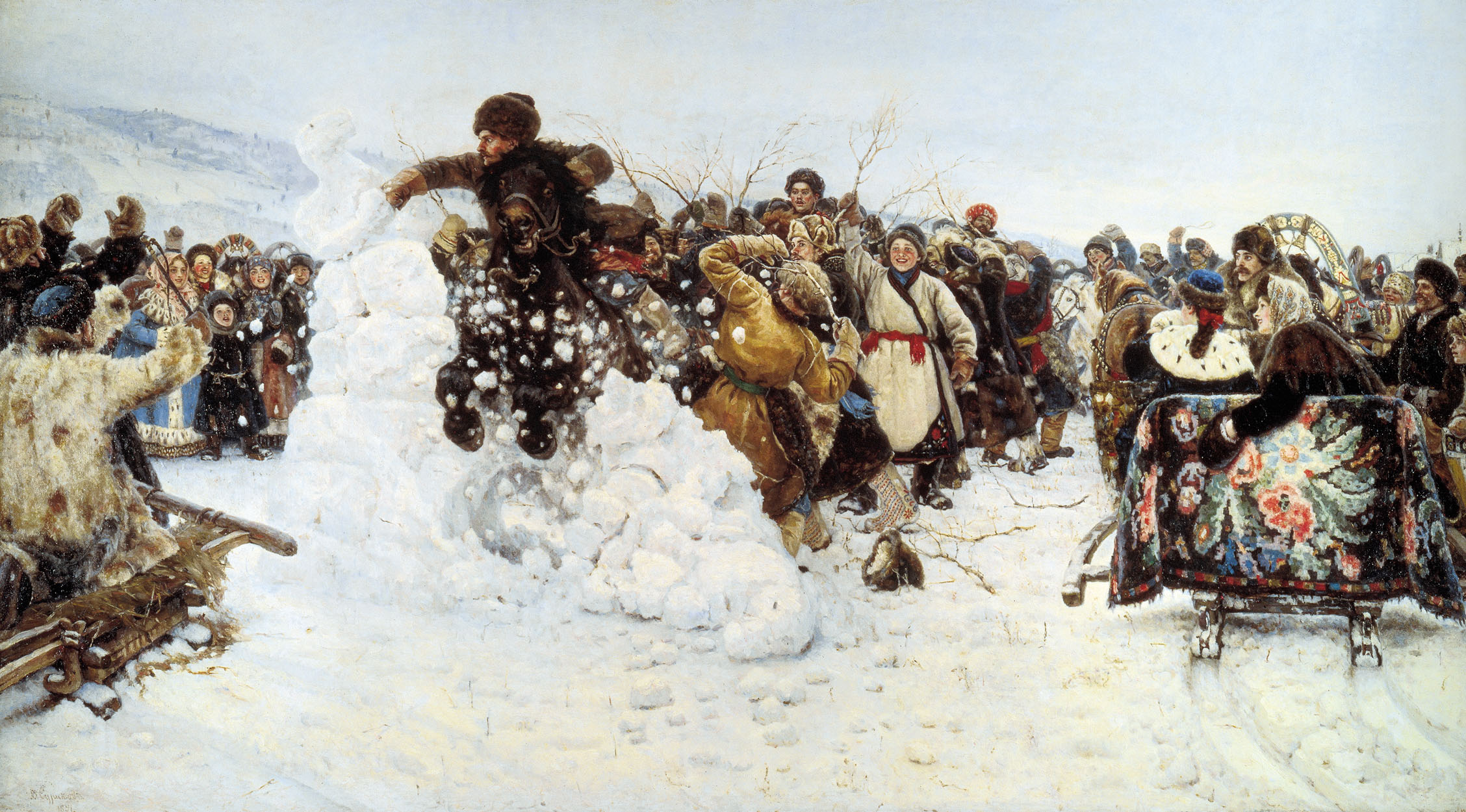
Vasily Surikov, Taking a Snow Town (1891)

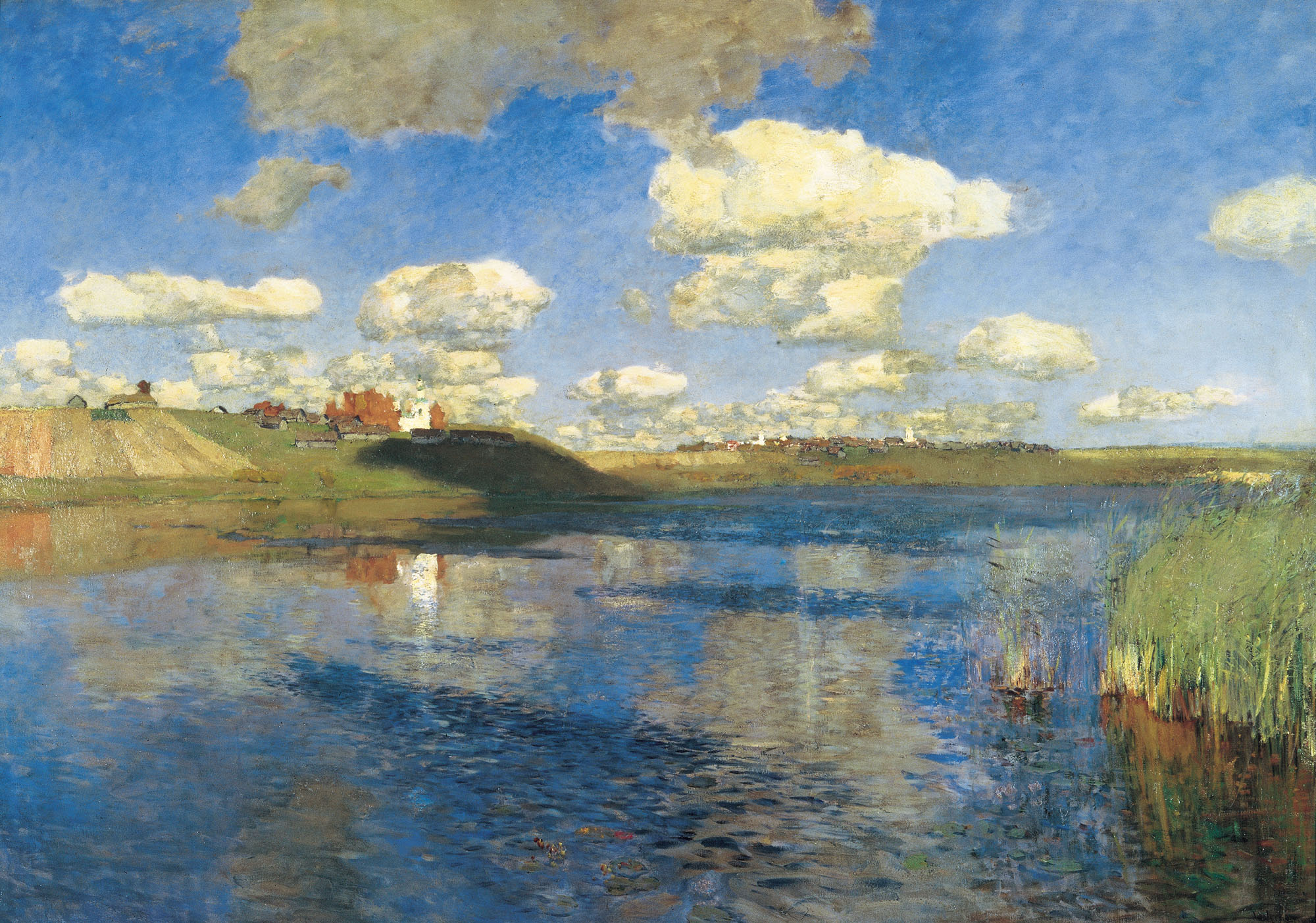
Isaak Levitan, Lake (1900)

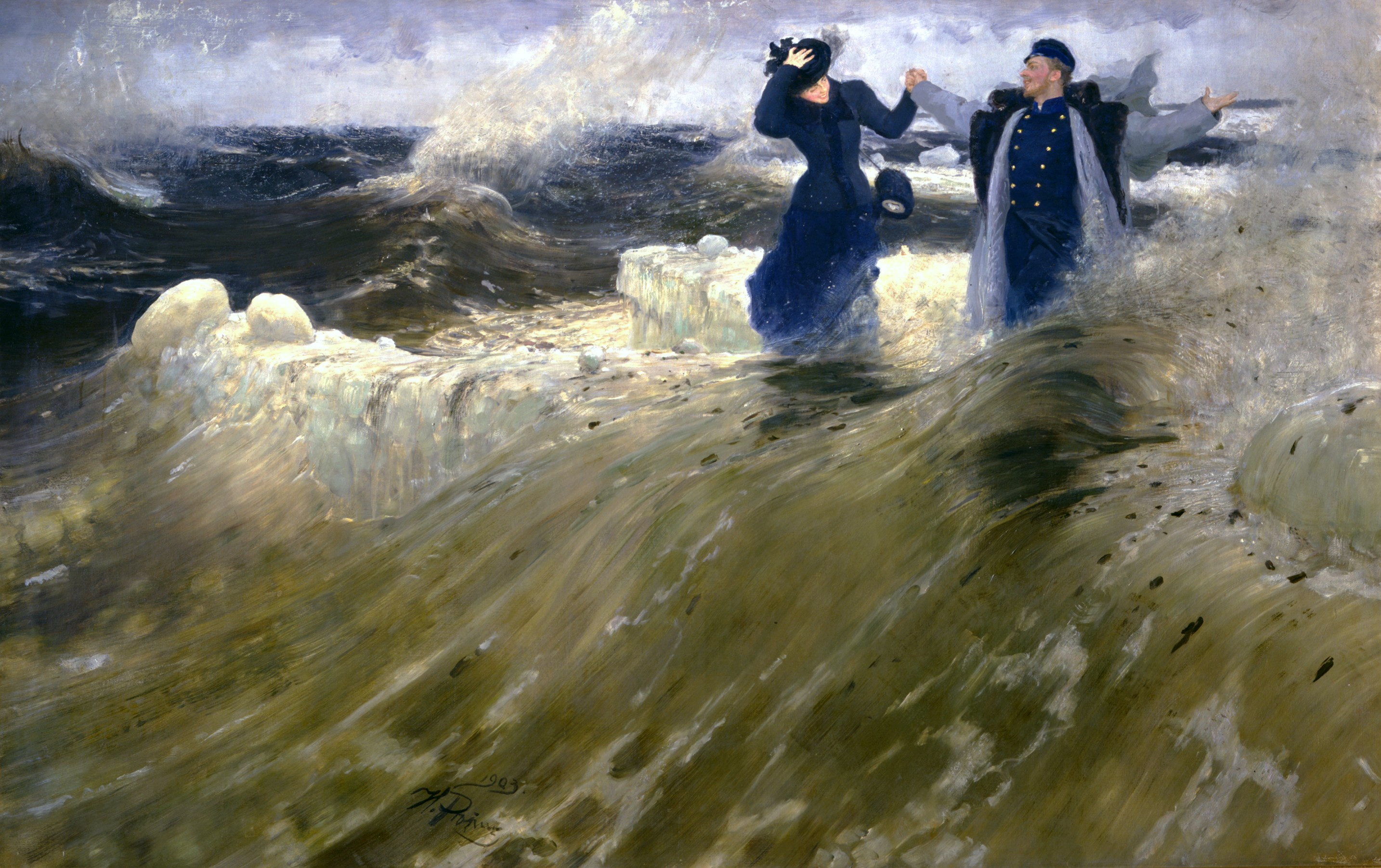
Ilya Repin, What freedom! (1903).

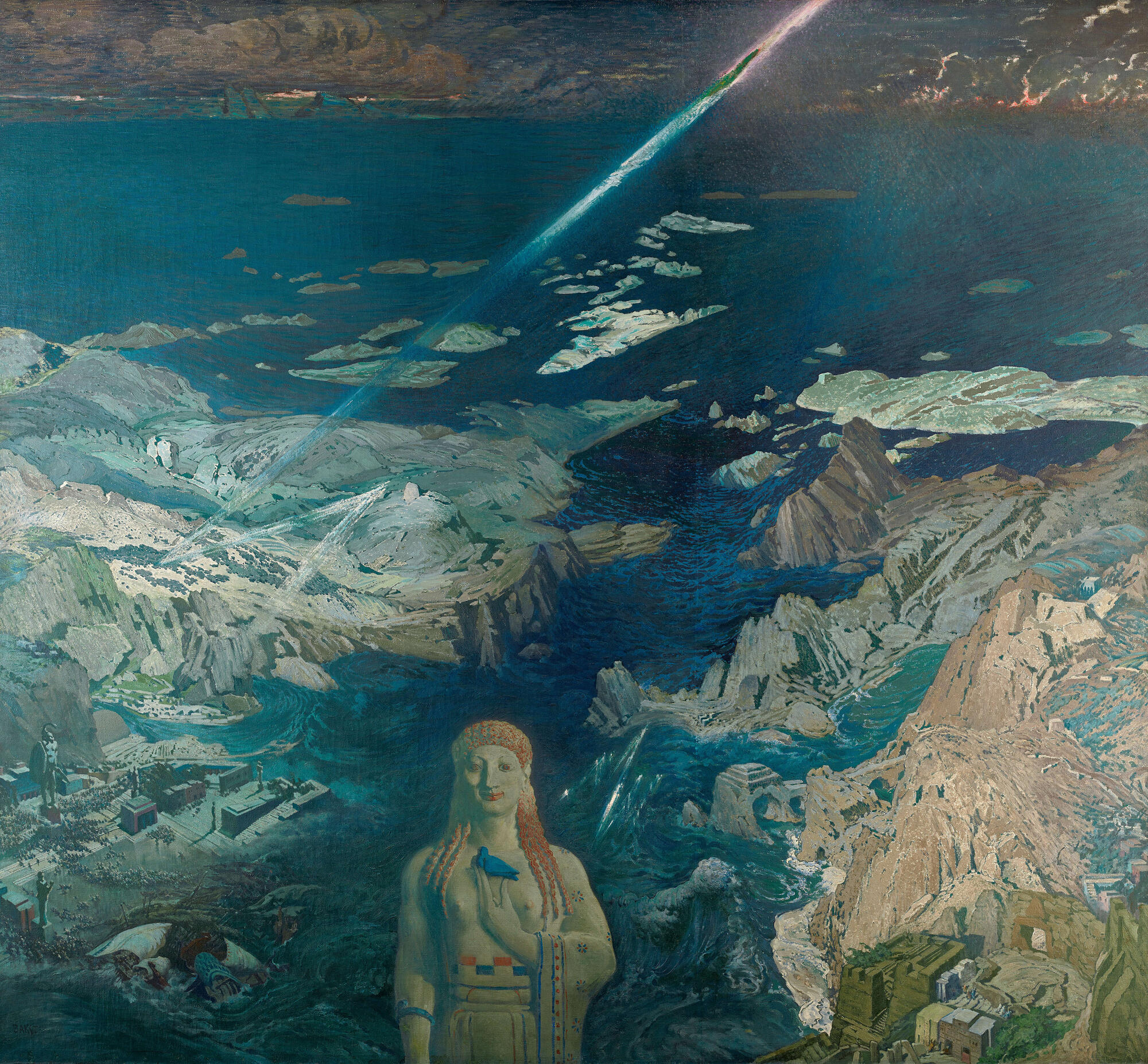
Léon Bakst, Ancient Horror (1908)

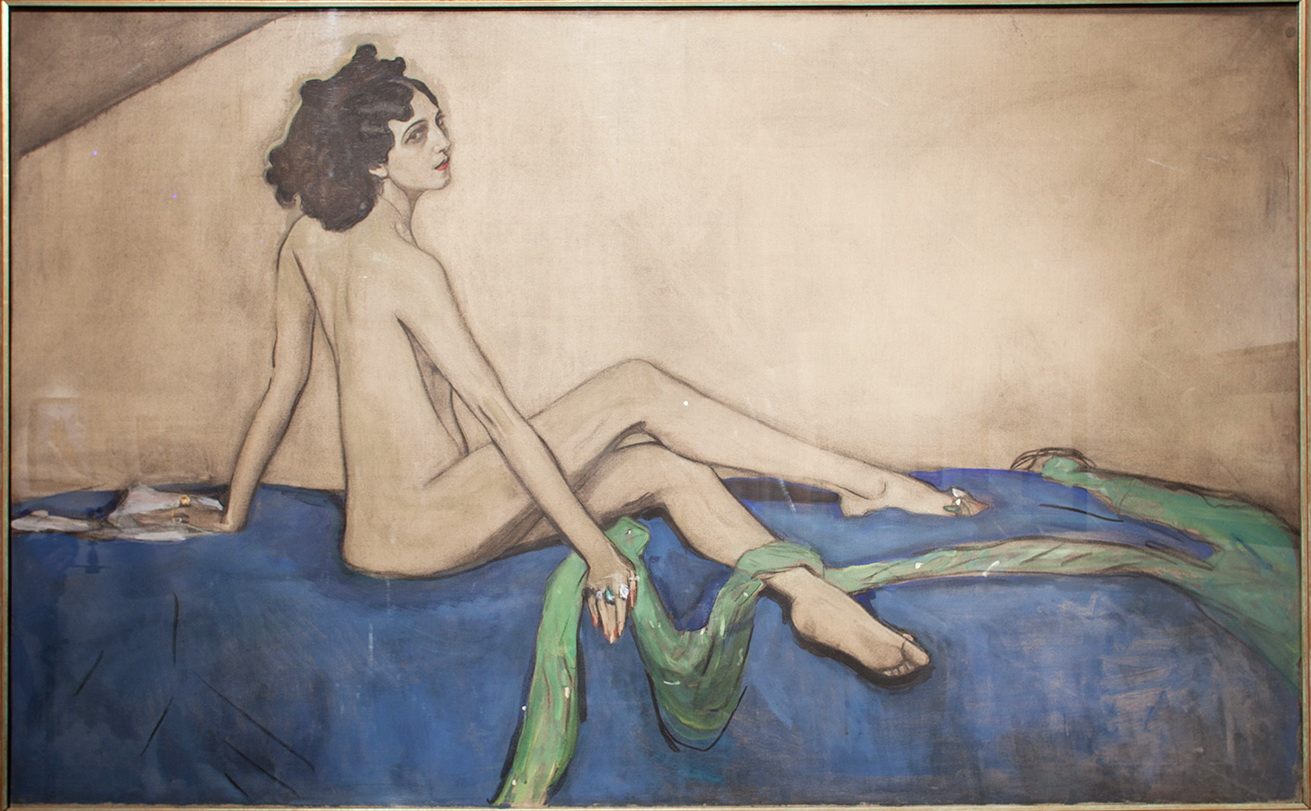
Valentin Serov, Portrait of Ida Rubenstein (1910)

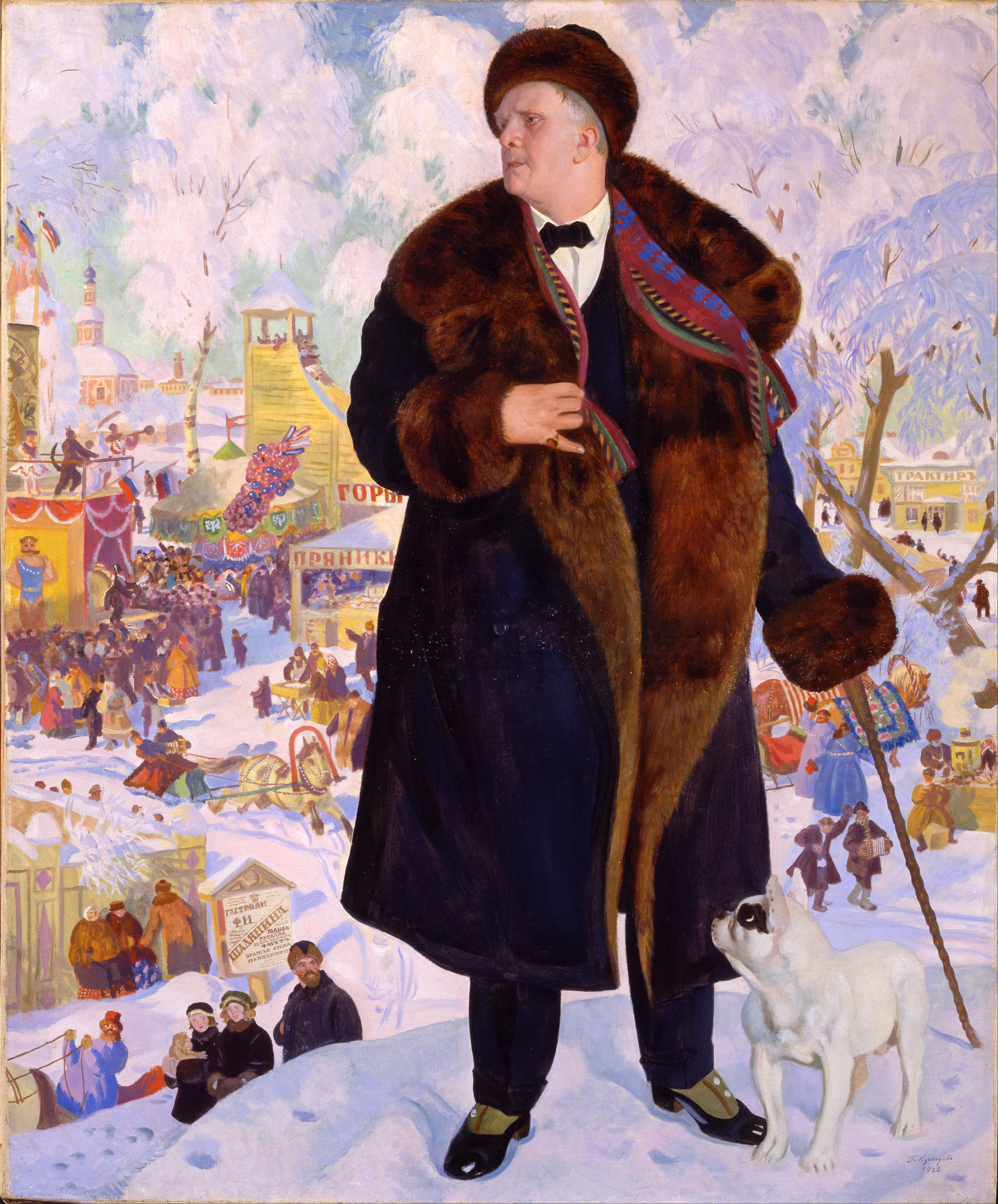
Boris Kustodiev, Portrait of Chaliapin (1921)

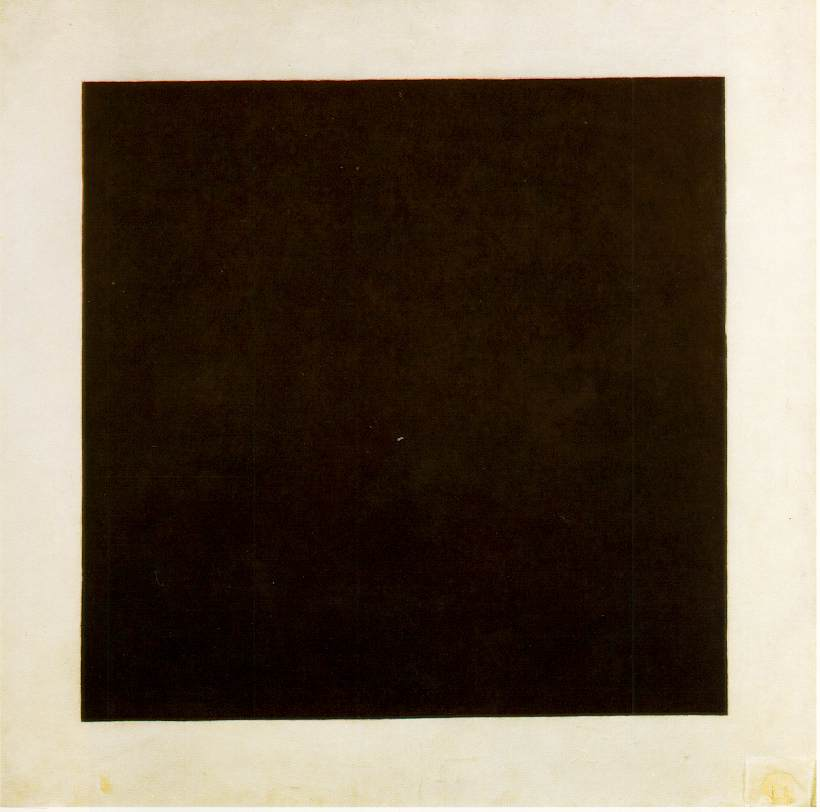
Kasimir Malevich, Black Square (1923)

== See also ==
- Art Culture Museum
- Collections of the Russian Museum
- Fine Art of Leningrad
- List of museums in Saint Petersburg
