= Igor Gorbunov (politician) =

Russian politician (1941–2022)

Chairman of the Bashkir Regional Committee of the Communist Party of the Soviet Union
- In office 10 February 1990 – August 1991
- Preceded by: Ravmer Habibullin
- Succeeded by: position abolished

Personal details
- Born: Igor Alekseyevich Gorbunov; 12 July 1941 Chkalov, Russian SFSR, Soviet Union
- Died: 22 September 2022 (aged 81)
- Party: CPSU
- Education: Ufa State Petroleum Technological University

Igor Alekseyevich Gorbunov (Russian: Игорь Алексеевич Горбунов; 12 July 1941 – 22 September 2022) was a Russian politician. He served as Chairman of the Bashkir Regional Committee of the Communist Party of the Soviet Union from 1990 to 1991.

Gorbunov died on 22 September 2022, at the age of 81.
