= Boris Pinson =

Boris Davidovich Pinson (Russian: Борис Давидович Пинсон; 1892, in Vitebsk – 23 November 1936, in Moscow) was a Russian revolutionary, Soviet politician and writer.

He joined the Bolshevik wing of the RSDLP in 1907. At the time of the February Revolution, 1917, he was in exile in the Yeniseysk Governorate.

Pinson was first secretary of the Tatarstan Regional Committee of the Communist Party of the Soviet Union from November 1923 to January 1924. Pinson was expelled from the Communist Party for his support of the Left Opposition but was reinstated in the party after his recognition of erroneous beliefs in 1928.

From 1934 to 1936, Pinson was Senior Inspector of the Inspectorate of the Union of Oil and Gas Sales of the People's Commissariat of Heavy Industry of the USSR.

However, he was arrested on 12 May 1936 and charged with "counter-revolutionary terrorist activities." The Military Collegium of the Supreme Court of the USSR sentenced him to death on 4 November 1936, and he was shot on 23 November, 1936 in the building of the All-Russian Special Forces in Moscow. He was buried in the Don Cemetery.

He was posthumously rehabilitated by the Military Collegium of the Supreme Court of the USSR on 14 November, 1957.
