= Central Auditing Commission of the 17th Congress of the All-Union Communist Party (Bolsheviks) =

This electoral term of the Central Auditing Commission was elected by the 17th Congress of the All-Union Communist Party (Bolsheviks) in 1934, and was in session until the convocation of the 18th Congress in 1939.

== Composition ==
Members of the Central Auditing Commission of the 17th Congress of the All-Union Communist Party (Bolsheviks)
| Name | Cyrillic | 16th CAC | 18th CAC | Birth | Death | PM | Nationality | Gender | Ref. |
|---|---|---|---|---|---|---|---|---|---|
| Vladimir Adoratsky | Владимир Адоратский | New | Not | 1878 | 1945 | 1904 | Russian | Male | |
| Yakov Agranov | Иван Алексеев | New | Arrested | 1883 | 1938 | 1915 | Jew | Male | |
| Ivan Alekseyev | Я́ков Агра́нов | New | Arrested | 1895 | 1939 | 1917 | Russian | Male | |
| Lazar Aronshtam | Ла́зарь Ароншта́м | New | Arrested | 1896 | 1938 | 1915 | Jew | Male | |
| Sergey Chutskayev | Чуцкаев делегатом | New | Removed | 1876 | 1944 | 1903 | Russian | Male | |
| Vasily Fomin | Васи́лий Фоми́н | New | Arrested | 1896 | 1938 | 1917 | Polish | Male | |
| Nikolai Janson | Николай Янсон | New | Arrested | 1882 | 1938 | 1905 | Estonian | Male | |
| Aghasi Khanjian | Агаси Ханджян | New | Suicide | 1901 | 1936 | 1917 | Armenian | Male | |
| Mikhail Khloplyankin | Михаил Хлоплянкин | New | Arrested | 1892 | 1938 | 1903 | Russian | Male | |
| Aleksei Kiselyov | Алексей Киселёв | New | Arrested | 1879 | 1937 | 1898 | Russian | Male | |
| Yevgeniya Kogan | Евгения Коган | New | Arrested | 1886 | 1938 | 1907 | Jew | Female | |
| Grigory Kutov | Григорий Крутов | New | Arrested | 1894 | 1939 | 1918 | Russian | Male | |
| Mamia Orakhelashvili | Мамиа Орахелашви́ли | New | Removed | 1881 | 1937 | 1903 | Georgian | Male | |
| Pavel Pevznyak | Павел Певзняк | New | Arrested | 1898 | 1942 | 1917 | Russian | Male | |
| Yakov Popok | Яков Попок | New | Arrested | 1894 | 1938 | 1909 | Jew | Male | |
| Stanislav Redens | Станисла́в Ре́денс | New | Arrested | 1892 | 1940 | 1914 | Polish | Male | |
| Evgeniy Ryabinin | Борис Магидов | Old | Arrested | 1892 | 1938 | 1917 | Russian | Male | |
| Ilya Shelekhes | Илья Шелехес | Old | Arrested | 1891 | 1937 | 1908 | Russian | Male | |
| Yakov Soifer | Я́ков Со́йфер | New | Arrested | 1885 | 1938 | 1907 | Jew | Male | |
| Kirill Sukhomlin | Кирилл Сухомлин | New | Arrested | 1886 | 1938 | 1905 | Ukrainian | Male | |
| Mikhail Vladimirsky | Михаил Владимирский | Old | Reelected | 1874 | 1951 | 1898 | Russian | Male | |
| Mikhei Yerbanov | Михе́й Ерба́нов | New | Arrested | 1889 | 1938 | 1917 | Buryat | Male | |
