= Lazar Aronshtam =

Soviet politician (1896–1938)

Lazar Naumovich Aronshtam
- Born: 8 June 1896; Borzna, Chernigov Governorate, Russian Empire
- Died: 25 March 1938 (aged 41)
- Allegiance: Soviet Union
- Branch: Soviet Red Army
- Service years: 1918–1937
- Rank: Army Commissar 2nd rank
- Conflicts: Russian Civil War

Lazar Naumovich Aronshtam (8 June 1896 – 25 March 1938) was a Soviet military and political officer.

He was born in what is now Ukraine. He was the brother of Grigory Aronshtam. He fought in the Russian Civil War on the side of the Bolsheviks. He was a member of the 17th Central Auditing Commission of the All-Union Communist Party (Bolsheviks) which was established in 1934. During the Great Purge, he was arrested on 31 May 1937 and executed the following year.

== Early years ==
He was born on 8 June 1896 in the village of Borzna, Chernihiv Governorate (according to other sources, in the city of Romny) in the Jewish family of a merchant. From 1907 to 1914, he studied at the Łódź Manufacturing and Industrial School. From 1915 he studied at the 8th Warsaw Gymnasium in Chernihiv, in 1917 he graduated from the 1st Koven Gymnasium in Kharkiv.

== Military career ==
He joined the Bolshevik faction of the Russian Social Democratic Labour Party ("RSDLP(b)") in July 1915. From April to September 1917, he was a party worker of the committee of the RSDLP(b) in Kharkiv. From September 1917 to February 1918, he was a Red Guard of the Sokolnytskyi District Revolutionary Committee. In 1918, he joined the Communist Youth Union.

In February-March 1918, he was a cadet at the 1st Artillery School in Moscow. In March-April 1918, he was a Red Guard scout of the 1st Army of the Gomel Division, 1st Moscow Revolutionary Detachment of the Western Front. From April to June 1918, he was a political fighter of the All-Russian Collegium on the Organization and Formation of the RSHA at the Tikhoretska station of the North Caucasian Railway. From July to August 1918, he was a political fighter of the Podvoisky detachment in Kursk and Lhov.

In August-November 1918, he was the military commissar of the battalion of the 5th Middle Ural Rifle Regiment of the RSHA. From November 1918 to January 1919, he was a member of the editorial board of the newspaper "Red Fighter" of the 3rd Army of the RSHA of the Eastern Front.

In January-April 1919, he was the military commissar of the 14th Rifle Division of the 9th Army of the Southern Front. From April to October 1919, he was the military commissar of the 3rd brigade, from November 1919 to March 1920, he was the military commissar of the 1st brigade of the 14th infantry division of the Southern Front.

In March 1920 - August 1921, he was the military commissar of the 14th Stepin Rifle Division on the Caucasian Front. In August-November 1921, he was the military commissar of the 28th Rifle Division of the 11th Army of the RSChA. From November 1921 to April 1923, he studied at the Military Academy of the RSFSR. From May 1923 to June 1924, he was the military commissar of the 4th Rifle Division of the RSHA of the Western Front. From June to July 1924, he was assistant to the commander of the 5th Rifle Corps from the political unit on the Western Front. From July to September 1924, he was the military commissar of the Artillery Inspection of the Russian Red Army in Moscow.

From September 1924 to February 1926, he worked illegally in Poland as a military intelligence officer. In 1924-1925 he was a member of the Central Committee of the Communist Party of Poland and from 1924 he was the secretary of the Central Committee of the Communist Party of Western Belarus.

In February 1926, he was arrested by the Polish authorities and was in prison until January 1928. In January 1928, after the exchange of those arrested, he returned to the USSR.

From January to July 1928 he was assigned to party work in the Polish section of the Comintern in Moscow. In 1928, he was the military commissar of the Artillery and Armored Forces Inspection of the RSChA. From July 1928 to November 1929, he was the responsible secretary of the Vitebsk District Committee of the Communist Party of Belarus.

From December 1929 to September 1933, he was the head of the Political Department and a member of the Revolutionary Military Council of the Belarusian Military District in Smolensk. From September 1933 to December 1936, he was deputy commander and head of the Political Department of the Special Red Banner Far Eastern Army in Khabarovsk. From 1934 to 1937, he was a member of the Military Council under the People's Commissar of Defense of the USSR. From December 1936 to May 1937, he was deputy commander of the political department, head of the Political Department and a member of the military council of the Moscow Military District. In May 1937, he became the head of the Political Department and a member of the Military Council of the Volga Military District.

== Arrest and execution ==
On 31 May 1937 he was arrested by the NKVD authorities and expelled from the Military Council under the People's Commissar of Defense of the USSR. During the investigation, "physical methods of influence" were applied to him. On 25 March 1938 the Military Collegium of the Supreme Court of the USSR sentenced him to death and was shot on the same day.

On 2 June 1956 he was posthumously rehabilitated. On 25 July 1956 he was reinstated as a member of the CPSU.
