= Nikolai Kirtok =

Soviet pilot (1920–2022)

- Николай Наумович Кирток; Микола Наумович Кирток
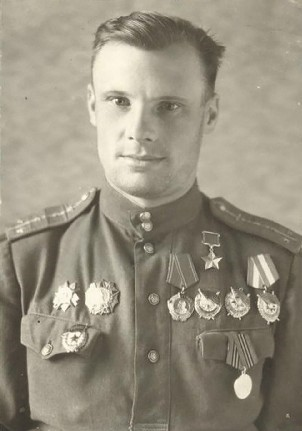
- Kirtok wearing his World War II decorations
- Born: Nikolai Naumovich Kirtok; 6 December 1920; Marynivka village, Voznesensk Raion, Kherson Governorate, Ukrainian SSR
- Died: 25 September 2022 (aged 101); Moscow, Russia
- Military career
- Allegiance: Soviet Union
- Branch: Soviet Air Force
- Service years: 1939–1976
- Rank: Colonel
- Units: 66th Assault Aviation Regiment; 140th Guards Assault Aviation Regiment
- Commands: 143rd Guards Assault Aviation Regiment
- Conflicts: World War II
- Awards: Hero of the Soviet Union

Nikolai Naumovich Kirtok (Russian: Николай Наумович Кирток; Ukrainian: Микола Наумович Кирток; 6 December 1920 – 25 September 2022) was a Soviet pilot who served during World War II. Kirtok flew 210 missions, mainly as a pilot of an attack aircraft, and in the summer of 1945, received the title of Hero of the Soviet Union.

== Early life ==
Kirtok was born on 6 December 1920 in the village of Marynivka in Mykolaiv Oblast of Ukrainian SSR, into a peasant family of Ukrainian ethnicity.

During his childhood, he lived in Odessa and graduated from the ninth grade of school. He later worked as a locksmith at the plant named after the October Revolution in Odessa. From 1938, he simultaneously worked at a flying club in Odessa.

== Military career ==
=== World War II ===
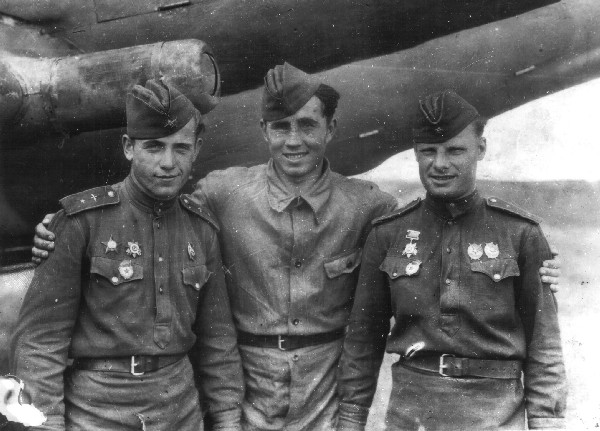
Kirtok (right) with members of his squadron (1940s)

In 1939, he was drafted into the ranks of the Red Army. Following the outbreak of Operation Barbarossa on 22 June 1941, together with the aviation school, he was evacuated to the city of Jizzakh in Uzbek SSR. In 1942, he graduated from the Tambov Military Aviation Pilot School. He served in the 43rd Reserve Aviation Regiment of the 1st Reserve Aviation Brigade in the Red Air Force.

Kirtok began flying missions in the Ilyushin Il-2 attack aircraft as part of the 2nd and 5th Air Armies of the Steppe, 1st Ukrainian and 2nd Ukrainian Fronts. He joined the Communist Party of Soviet Union in 1943. He flew missions as a pilot and flight commander of the 66th Assault Aviation Regiment and the 140th Guards Assault Aviation Regiment. In October 1944, he was transferred as a squadron commander to the 143rd Guards Attack Aviation Regiment. He received his baptism of fire at the battles of Kursk and Dnieper in 1943. Kirtok later flew missions in the Dnieper-Carpathian, Lvov-Sandomierz and Vistula-Oder offensives.

He distinguished himself during the Battle of Berlin in 1945, when he twice led a group of Il-2s to destroy enemy artillery and mortar positions on the southwestern outskirts of Berlin on 24 April. With a well-aimed air strike, the group managed to successfully destroy four artillery batteries.

During the period from 27 July 1943 to 11 May 1945, Kirtok made 210 successful sorties in the face of strong opposition from German anti-aircraft artillery and fighter aircraft. According to his combat account, he destroyed and damaged 38 enemy tanks and armored personnel carriers, 54 vehicles, 7 fuel tanks, 1 ammunition train and 6 anti-aircraft artillery batteries. During aerial battles, he was credited with 1 solo and 4 shared aerial shootdowns of enemy aircraft. He was appointed squadron commander of the 143rd Guards Assault Aviation Regiment on 10 May 1945.

On 24 June 1945, he took part in the Victory Parade on Red Square in Moscow. By the decree of the Presidium of the Supreme Soviet of the USSR of 27 June 1945, for the exemplary performance of the command's combat missions to destroy enemy manpower and equipment and the courage and heroism of the guards shown at the same time, Senior Lieutenant Kirtok was awarded the title of Hero of the Soviet Union with the award of the Order of Lenin and the Gold Star medal.

=== Post war ===
After the war, he continued to serve in the Soviet Air Force, commanding the 143rd Guards Assault Aviation Regiment until May 1946. After graduating from the Air Force Academy in 1951, Kirtok served at the Air Force Scientific Testing Institute as head of the tactical aircraft testing department. From 1954 to 1976, he served in the Main Operations Directorate of the General Staff of the Armed Forces of the USSR. He attained the rank of colonel in 1957.

From February 1976, Kirtok was transferred to the reserves.

== Later life and death ==
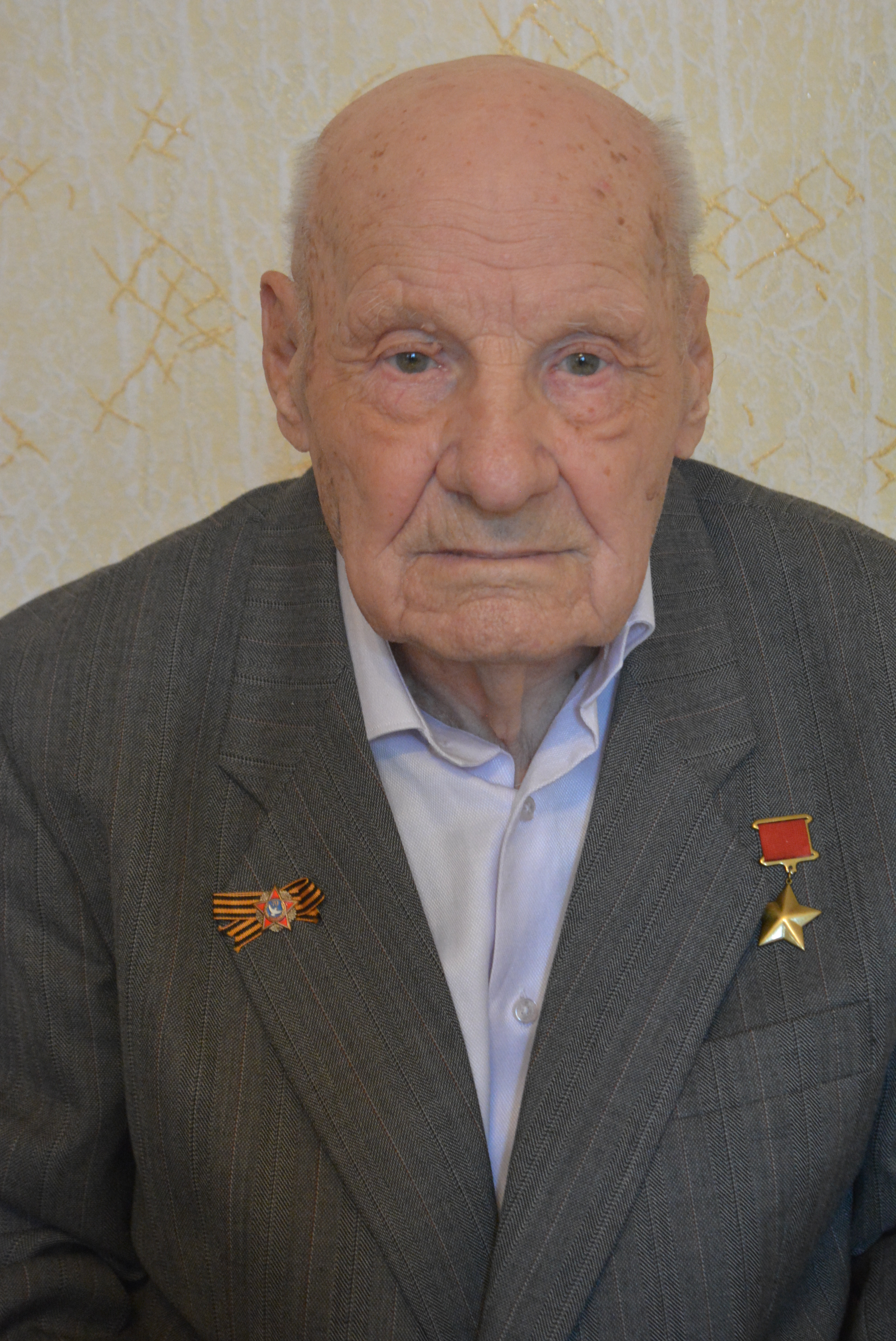
Kirtok in 2016

After his retirement from the military, he worked as a design engineer at the A.S. Yakovlev Design Bureau in the late 1970s and 1980s. Kirtok resided in Moscow.

On 6 December 2020, he turned 100 years old. Kirtok died on 25 September 2022, at the age of 101.

== Awards and decorations ==
His awards include:

Hero of the Soviet Union (27 June 1945)
Order of Lenin (27 June 1945)
Order of the Red Banner, three times (26 October 1943, 19 March 1944, 19 May 1945)
Order of Alexander Nevsky (USSR) (8 March 1945)
Order of Alexander Nevsky (Russia) (7 December 2020)
Order of the Patriotic War, 1st class, twice (31 October 1943, 11 March 1985)
Order of the Red Star
Order "For Service to the Homeland in the Armed Forces of the USSR", 3rd class (30 April 1975)
Medal "For Battle Merit"
Medal of Zhukov
Medal "For the Liberation of Prague" (1945)
Medal "For the Capture of Berlin" (1945)
Medal "For the Victory over Germany in the Great Patriotic War 1941–1945" (1945)

- jubilee medals
