= Vahe Danielyan =

Turkish soldier (born 1920)

- Armenian: Վահէ Տանիելյան
- Born: 14 January 1920; Istanbul, Ottoman Empire
- Military career
- Allegiance: Soviet Union
- Branch: Soviet Army
- Service years: 1941–1945
- Conflicts: World War II
- Awards: Medal "For the Victory over Germany in the Great Patriotic War 1941–1945"

Vahe Danielyan (Armenian: Վահէ Տանիելյան; born 14 January 1920) first served in the Fifth Army infantry in Ukraine during World War II and was captured no less than five times. After surviving in German and Italian prisoner of war camps, Danielyan was charged with treason by the Soviet government in 1947 and was imprisoned and sentenced to 15 years of hard labor in a Soviet concentration camp. He was awarded the Prisoner of War medal (6 times) and a Victory Medal from the Soviet Union.

== Early life ==
Vahe Danielyan was born in Istanbul, Ottoman Empire on 14 January 1920. His father, Daniel Danielyan, who was born in Constantinople and a graduate of the French Medical Academy, was a doctor and a therapist. His mother, Eliza Ohanyan, was a housewife who was born in Konya. The family would move to Soviet Armenia in 1924 because his father wanted to "serve his people" and not the Turks. Danielyan attended the local Armenian school for three years. At the age of 20 in 1940, Danielyan was recruited and sent to Novocherkassk for Officer's School. He graduated with high honors.

Danielyan speaks Armenian, English, Russian, Ukrainian, German, Turkish, French and Spanish.

== World War II ==
After his graduation, World War II broke out. He was sent to the front and assigned to the Fifth Army. When Danielyan arrived, fighting soon commenced between German and Soviet forces near Kiev. Danielyan describes the event as follows:

Our casualties were terrifying! We had no communication with our headquarters. There was no discipline or order among our soldiers and panic began. Very soon, German tanks came nearer and we had to retreat into the forests, throwing away our arms. One of my sergeants and I managed to get some civilian clothes in the nearest village and made our way to the east hoping to get through the front line. But, alas, while going through a village we were halted by German guards and sent to a prisoner of war camp.

Danielyan managed to escape from that camp the very next day with the help of some of his friends who lifted up the barbed wire. He "snaked" his way through and escaped. Danielyan would later remark, "However, the guards were shooting at me, but I was able to get away. So I made my way east with the intention of joining my army."

While walking on foot, Danielyan was captured five times by the German and Italian troops and sent to five POW camps. Danielyan managed to survive and escape from the other camps he had joined. He found that escaping the Italian camps were easier since they were less strict.

When German troops arrived in Rostov on Don, Danielyan lost hope of reaching the Soviet frontier. He turned back and went to a town called Taganrog, hoping to find food, water and shelter:

At last, shivering from cold and hunger, drenched to the very marrow of my bones, I reached that town and found shelter in a kind of Ukrainian woman's flat. She lived in a tiny room with her two little boys. The room was so small that while sleeping on the floor I could hardly stretch my legs. They all slept together in one bed.

Famine was widespread throughout the town and Danielyan had no other choice but to go to Germany. While in Germany, he worked in a pipe manufacturing plant and lived in a camp in the Saar region on the bank of the Rhine River.

== Post-war period ==
In the summer of 1945, after the defeat of the Germans, Danieyan returned home to Armenia and worked as an electrical technician.

In 1947 he was charged by the Soviet government for being a traitor and was sentenced to 15 years of hard labor in a Soviet prison camp:

I was considered a traitor. Russian soldiers when recruited had to give an oath to fight to the last drop of blood and not be captured. In other words, they had to fight to their death. That's why we were considered traitors, because none of us did this when we were captured. We wanted to live. We were also expected to commit suicide so as not to fall into German hands. That's why the Soviet authorities considered us to be traitors, because we didn't follow orders. I didn't see anybody, even those who were Communists commit suicide. Nobody did that. That was an order put out by Joseph Stalin, of course. The worst part of my life experience began when I was sentenced to 15 years of imprisonment in Soviet concentration camps. First of all, when a person is guilty, it's not so hard to be imprisoned and serve his sentence because a criminal is a criminal he knows he is a criminal. Then it is not so hard to go through all this. But when a person is absolutely innocent, believe me, it's very hard to grow old through all these trials, you know. Everyday when you wake up, you think, and ask the question, 'Why am I here? Why, what have I done, indeed as a human being?'"

Danielyan was sent north of Siberia to Ukhta where he would build factories, towns, buildings, mines and power stations.

After working in Ukhta for 5 years, he and other prisoners were transferred to another camp. From there he was transferred still farther north to the Taymyr Peninsula, 2,000 kilometers north of Krasnoyarsk, to build the town of Norilsk. He was in the Arctic Circle near the North Ocean.

When Stalin died in 1953, Danielyan was released from the camps and head back to Yerevan, Armenia. He married Nyna Khoetsyan in 1959. They have one daughter, Gohar.

In 2015, Danielyan was interviewed, at the age of 94, about his adherence to a raw food diet, which he attributes to his longevity. His diet is composed of mainly raw fruit and vegetables, and he refrains from eating meat.

== Bibliography ==
- Demirjian, Richard N. (1996). Triumph and glory : Armenian World War II heroes. Moraga, California, United States: Ararat Heritage Publ. ISBN 9780962294518.
