= Art Culture Museum =

Former art museum in Saint Petersburg, Russia

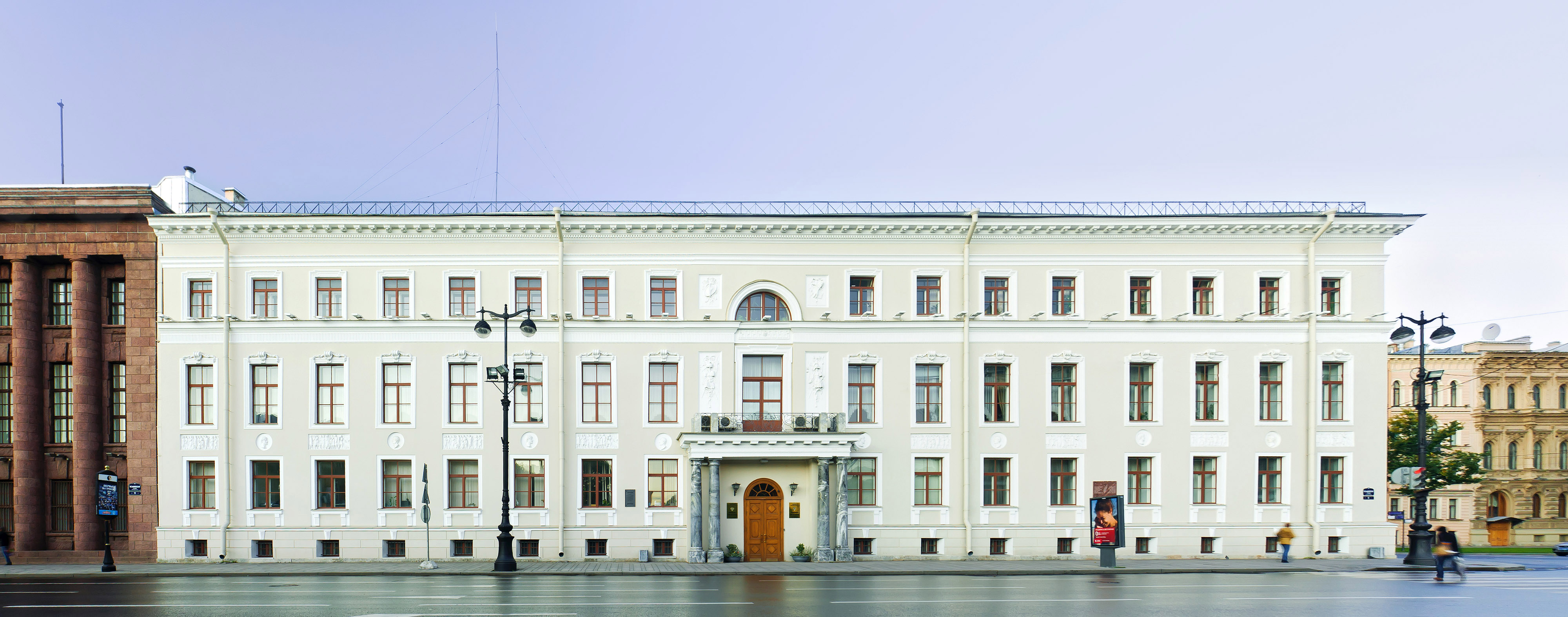

The Art Culture Museum was a museum in Saint Petersburg, Russia. It opened in 1921 in the former Myatlev family's house at 9 St.Isaac’s Square. It was founded by left-wing artists with the intention to demonstrate artistic culture such as painting techniques, materials and processing methods. Based on the museum, the Institute of Art Culture was established in 1923. The Art Culture Museum was shut down in 1926, and its possessions given to the State Russian Museum.
