= Mikhail Razumov =

Mikhail Osipovich Razumov (1894 - 30 October 1937) was a Ukrainian revolutionary and Soviet politician. He was Second Secretary of the Rybinsk Regional Committee (1922–1923), Second Secretary of the Orlov Regional Committee (1923–1924), Second Secretary of the Bashkortostan Communist Party (1924–1927), First Secretary of the Tatarstan Communist Party (1928–1933) and First Secretary of the East Siberian Regional Committee (1933 - May 1937). He was a member of the Central Committee elected by the 17th Congress of the All-Union Communist Party (Bolsheviks) from 1934 to 23 June 1937. Razumov was executed during the Great Purge.

Preceded by Mendel Khatayevich	First Secretary, Tatarstan Communist Party; 1928-1933	Succeeded by Alfred Lepa
Preceded by	First Secretary, East Siberian Regional Committee; 1933-1937	Succeeded by Aleksandr Shcherbakov (politician)

== Bibliography ==
- Разумов М. И. Год работы и ближайшие задачи Татарской партийной организации. Казань, 1929.
- Разумов М. И. Выйти в ряды передовых. Иркутск, 1934. 30 000 экз.
- Разумов М. И. Победно завершить сельскохозяйственный год. Иркутск, 1934. 25 000 экз.
- Разумов М. И. Хозяйственный подъём и культурное строительство Восточной Сибири. Иркутск, 1935. 15 000 экз.
- Разумов М. И. О проекте Конституции СССР. Иркутск, 1936.

== Sources ==
- Библиотека AZ-LIBR — Разумов Михаил Осипович
- Справочник по истории КПСС — Разумов Михаил Осипович
- Михаил Осипович Разумов
- Михаил Осипович Разумов
