= 1921 Russian Congress of Soviets election =

Elections to the 9th All-Russian Congress of Soviets were held in the Russian Soviet Federative Socialist Republic in the spring of 1921 (not to be confused with the 10th Congress of the Russian Communist Party (Bolsheviks)). They were the second elections in the history of the Soviet government, with the first such election in 1919, also to the All-Russian Congress of Soviets, not including one to the Petrograd Soviet in 1917, before the last stage of the Russian Revolution. There was some tension that year because of the revolt of sailors in the Kronstadt rebellion, actions of the Workers Opposition and monarchists, recent failure of a "communist uprising" in Germany (so called March Action), all while the fierce Russian Civil War continued unabated.

As the Bolshevik party, later called the Communist Party of the Soviet Union was reshaped by the elections, the Soviet government felt pressured to take action, so it attempted to welcome foreign investments with agreements of cooperation with Great Britain, Persia, and Afghanistan, nationalization of mosques in Crimea and began to implement the New Economic Policy or NEP. While the foreign policy efforts by Soviet Russia led to increased recognition internationally, other efforts faltered. The following year, the Soviet Union would be formed with the Treaty on the Creation of the USSR and the All-Union Congress of Soviets would serve as the unicameral legislature for the whole Soviet state, a position it would occupy until 1938 when the Supreme Soviet of Russia would be created.

== Conduct ==
The elections were considered to be a "semi-free" by some, because non-Bolshevik candidates could stand for office.
