= Yakov Bykin =

Soviet Communist official

Yakov Borisovich Bykin
- Яков Борисович Быкин

11th First Secretary of the Bashkir Regional Committee of the All–Union Communist Party (Bolsheviks)
- In office 1930 – October 1937
- Preceded by: Eduard Yurevich
- Succeeded by: Alexander Zalikin

Personal details
- Born: Yakov Borisovich Berkovich; December 25, 1888 Kreuzburg, Rezhitsky District, Vitebsk Governorate, Russian Empire
- Died: February 10, 1938 (aged 49) Moscow, Soviet Union
- Party: All–Union Communist Party (Bolsheviks) / Communist Party of the Soviet Union
- Awards: Order of Lenin

Military service
- Allegiance: Soviet Union
- Years of service: 1930–1937

Yakov Borisovich Bykin (Berkovich; December 25, 1888 – February 10, 1938) was the 1st Secretary of the Bashkir Regional Committee of the All–Union Communist Party (Bolsheviks) (1930 – October 1937).

== Biography ==
Yakov Borisovich Bykin (Berkovich) was born in 1888 in the city of Kreuzburg (now in Latvia) in the family of a clerk. Jewish by nationality.

He graduated from the 2nd grade of the state Jewish school. In 1927, he graduated from courses in Marxism.

In 1904–1912, he was a member of the Bund, in 1909–1911, he was in a leading position in the Riga Committee of the Bund. He was arrested several times.

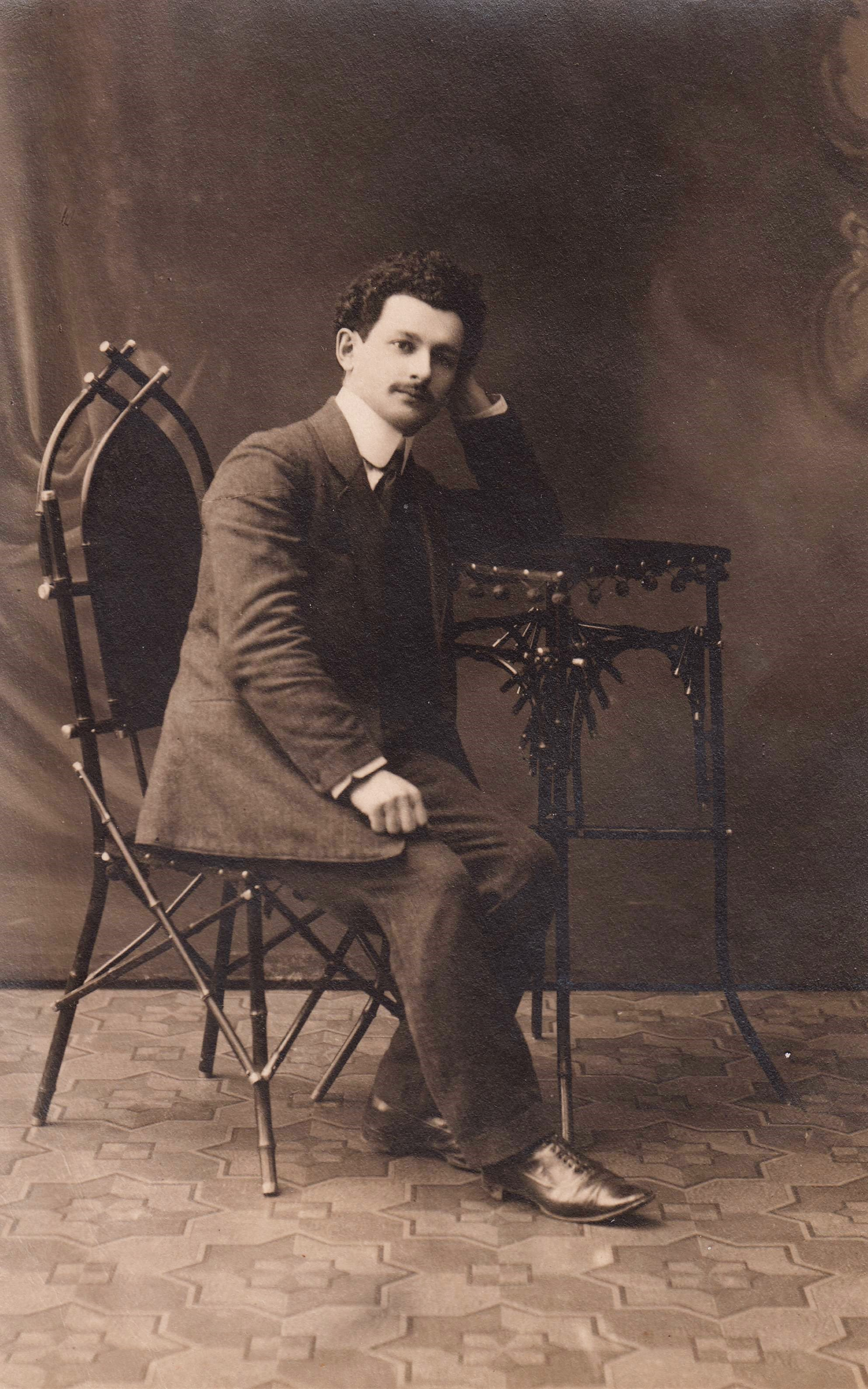
Bykin Yakov Borisovich, 1912

Since 1912 – a member of the Russian Social Democratic Labor Party (Bolsheviks), in 1912–1918, he was in exile in Switzerland; returned to Russia in 1918.

During the Civil War, he was in clandestine work in the rear of the Polish army, then in the revolutionary committee under the political administration of the 4th Army.

Place of work: from 1919 to 1922, he was in professional union, party work in the Belarusian Socialist Soviet Republic. From 1922 to 1925 – Executive Secretary of the Voronezh Provincial Committee of the Russian Communist Party (Bolsheviks), January 1925 – 1927 – Instructor of the Central Committee of the Russian Communist Party (Bolsheviks) – All–Union Communist Party (Bolsheviks), 1927–1929 – Executive Secretary of the Yaroslavl Provincial Committee of the All–Union Communist Party (Bolsheviks), December 19, 1927 – January 26, 1934 – member of the Central Auditing Commission of the All–Union Communist Party (Bolsheviks), since 1929 – Executive Secretary of the Yaroslavl District Committee of the All–Union Communist Party (Bolsheviks), February 1930 – October 6, 1937 – 1st Secretary of the Bashkir Regional Committee of the All–Union Communist Party (Bolsheviks), February 10, 1934 – October 12, 1937 – Candidate Member of the Central Committee of the All–Union Communist Party (Bolsheviks).

During the years of the second five–year plan, 36 large industrial enterprises were built in the Bashkir Autonomous Socialist Soviet Republic, and a new, Tumazinsky Oil Region, was opened. The number of Machine and Tractor Stations increased from 38 to 107.

In 1935, he was awarded the highest award of the Soviet Union – the Order of Lenin.

On April 29, 1937, son Volya was arrested by the People's Commissariat of Internal Affairs – a previously arrested alleged member of a terrorist organization slandered Volya Bykin, saying that he knew about the preparation of a terrorist act against Lazar Kaganovich. After Yakov Bykin's appeal to Yezhov and members of the Regional Committee, Volya was released on May 6, 1937.

On September 17, 1937, the newspaper Pravda published the article "A Handful of Bourgeois Nationalists in Bashkiria".

On October 4–6, 1937, an emergency 3rd Plenum of the Bashkir Regional Committee of the All–Union Communist Party (Bolsheviks) was held. Andrei Zhdanov arrived at the plenum and accused Bykin and the leadership of the republic of sabotage. It was asserted that there were two counter–revolutionary groups in the Bashkir party organization – the Trotskyist–Bukharin group led by Yakov Bykin, and the bourgeois–nationalist group led by Akhmet Isanchurin.

Andrei Zhdanov, who was conducting the plenum, said "the pillars have been cut down, the fences will fall down by themselves". The plenum elected a new bureau of the regional committee of the All–Union Communist Party (Bolsheviks) and ended with the arrests of 274 people, including Yakov Bykin. Until the end of 1937, about 1,000 people were arrested in the republic.

By a resolution of the plenum of the Central Committee of the All–Union Communist Party (Bolsheviks) of October 12, 1937, Yakov Bykin was removed from the list of candidates for membership in the Central Committee of the All–Union Communist Party (Bolsheviks).

On October 16, 1937, he was arrested.

Bykin's name is twice indicated in the pre–trial Stalinist Execution Lists: "Former Members and Candidates of the Central Committee of the All–Union Communist Party (Bolsheviks)" and "Moscow–Center". The Moscow Center list was approved by Joseph Stalin, Vyacheslav Molotov, Andrey Zhdanov.

On February 10, 1938, he was shot by the decision of the Collegium of the Supreme Court of the Soviet Union.

Charge: creation in the party organization of the Bashkir Regional Committee of the All–Union Communist Party (Bolsheviks) of a counter–revolutionary Trotskyist–Bukharin organization under the leadership of Bykin. Articles 58–1 "a", 19–58–8 and 58–11 of the Criminal Code of the Russian Soviet Federative Socialist Republic.

The case was reviewed by the Military Collegium of the Supreme Court of the Soviet Union on March 14, 1956.

Yakov Bykin was rehabilitated posthumously.

== Awards ==
Order of Lenin (No. 1202; 1935) – for outstanding achievements over a number of years in the field of agriculture and industry.

== Sources ==
- Book of Memory of the Republic of Bashkortostan. Ufa
