= Mendel Khatayevich =

Soviet politician

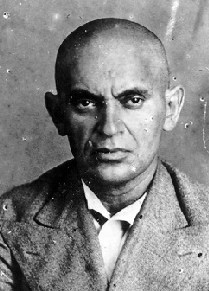
Mendel Khatayevich. Official NKVD photo after arrest 1937

Mendel Markovich Khatayevich (Russian: Мендель Маркович Хатаевич; 3 October 1893 – 30 October 1937) was a Soviet politician. was Second Secretary of the Communist Party (Bolsheviks) of Ukraine. He was one of the main organizers of collectivization in the Ukrainian Soviet Socialist Republic, which caused the death by starvation of millions of people.

Born in Gomel (in present-day Belarus) in 1893, the son of a merchant. Khatayevich joined the Bolshevik faction of the Russian Social Democratic Labour Party in 1913. Arrested in 1914, he was exiled to Angara. Released from exile by the February Revolution, he returned to Gomel, but in 1918, was transferred to Samara, where he was taken prisoner by anti-Bolshevik troops, and tortured so badly that his right hand was paralysed, but he survived and was rescued when the city was recaptured by the Red Army. From November 1918, he held a succession of party posts in Gomel, Odesa, Moscow, and the Tatar Republic. In 1930, he was elected a member of the Central Committee of the Communist Party of the Soviet Union.

Khatayevich was the regional secretary of the Communist Party in the Central Volga Region from 1928 until 1932, and therefore throughout most of the period of collectivisation. In January 1930, Khatayevich created a 'combat headquarters' to direct the suppression of peasants who resisted being forced to hand their land and livestock over to the collective farms. On 20 January, the regional party committee ordered the OGPU to be ready to deport up to 10,000 "kulaks" (wealthy peasants) and their families. The following day, he applied to the Central Committee for permission to have 3,000 peasants arrested. On 29 January, a meeting of local officials decided to increase that number to 5,000, and to evict 15,000 families. These measures provoked civil war in the region, with the Red Army having to be deployed to round up peasants, and party members having to be armed. This caused alarm in Moscow. On 31 January, Joseph Stalin, sent Khateyevich a telegram warning that "Your haste on the kulak issue has nothing to do with party policy, What you're dealing with is naked dispossession of the kulaks in the worst form." Khatayevich replied the following day saying that "We cannot suspend the arrest of kulak-White Guard activists, as it is almost complete".

In March 1930, Stalin published an article in Pravda entitled Dizzy with Success, which blamed local officials for the excesses committed during the early months of the new campaign for mass collectivisation which Stalin and the rest of the Central Committee had approved. In April, Khatayevich wrote an unusually outspoken response, in which he suggested that a large share of the blame lay at the centre. He claimed: "Instructions should have been given to the central press so that, in criticising the deviations and excesses which took place, they should attack and mock not only local officials. Many directives on collectivising all livestock, including the smallest types, came from the agricultural commissariat". 1

== Role in the Holodomor ==
In October 1932, Khatayevich was transferred to Ukraine, as a member of the Political Bureau of the Communist Party (Bolsheviks) of Ukraine, and Secretary of the Ukraine Communist Party Central Committee. He was a member of the Ukrainian Politburo until his arrest, seven years later. When the Court of Appeal for Kyiv City investigated the famine that swept through Ukraine in the 1930s, in a judgement delivered on 13 January 2010, they found Khatayevich and other long-dead Soviet leaders Joseph Stalin, Vyacheslav Molotov, Lazar Kaganovich, Pavel Postyshev, Stanislav Kosior and Vlas Chubar guilty of "organizing genocide of the Ukrainian ethnic group".

It is well documented that Khatayevich knew that the harvest of 1932 was dismal, and was threatening starvation for the rural population. Nine days after his arrival, he wrote to Stalin to warn that Ukraine was not going to meet its target for delivering grain, and might produce only half of what was expected, citing as one of the main reasons "the decreased well-being of collective farmers (and) lack of proper production activity on collective farms." But on 23 October 1932, he sent a directive to every regional, city and district committee of the Ukraine Communist Party ordering them to take firm measures to confiscate grain from peasants. In November, he and Chubar co-signed a decree on "crushing kulak groups", which led to the army being deployed to break the resistance of the peasants.

Early in 1933, Khatayevich was moved to Dnipropetrovsk, as First Secretary of the regional communist party. In March 1933, he wrote to Stalin, again, warning "I am literally inundated with daily reports and materials about cases of starvation, swelling and disease from hunger. In recent days, there have been more and more reports of corpse-eating and cannibalism." This included corpses lying on the streets of several towns. He went on to claim that many of these reports of death and illness were "exaggerated", but pleaded all the same for emergency medical care. In June, he sent a telegram begging for food to be sent the region.

There was no hint of these problems in the speech Khatayevich delivered to the 17th Party Congress in 1934, when he praised the "fighting spirit" of Ukraine's collective farmers, and the way that "Comrade Stalin led our party, led us, our entire army of fighters for socialism, with the greatest firmness, calmness, composure, with a clear perspective."

== Arrest and death ==
In 1935, at the regional party plenum, Khatayevich spoke out against wholesale purges, and in August 1936, he stated there that “there are elements of authoritarianism in the practice of our leadership”. He was, on the other hand, one of the beneficiaries of the Great Purge in its early stage, when he was promoted to the post of Second Secretary of the Communist Party of the Ukrainian SSR in March 1937, when Postyshev was sacked.

However, on 15 July 1937, a man named Kulyakin, who was visiting Moscow from Dnepropetrovsk, wrote a letter to the Central Committee, wanting to know why Khatayevich was still in office when more two dozen officials linked to him had been arrested. The letter was passed to Stalin, who had it sent on to the head of the Dnepropetovsk party committee, Natan Margolis, ordering him to check it out. Khatayevich was arrested on 7 September 1937, and on 27 October 1937 sentenced to death on charges of participating in a counterrevolutionary terrorist organization and executed.

In 1956 Khatayevich was rehabilitated and his membership in the Party restored.
