= List of ship decommissionings in 1993 =

The list of ship decommissionings in 1993 includes a chronological list of all ships decommissioned in 1993.

	Operator	Ship	Flag	Class and type	Fate	Other notes
28 February	Royal Navy	Sirius		Leander-class frigate	Sunk as target in 1998	
31 March	Royal Navy	Argonaut		Leander-class frigate	Sold as scrap	
31 March	Hellenic Navy	Katsonis		Tench-class submarine		
June	Royal Navy	Andromeda		Leander-class frigate	Sold to India in 1995	
25 June	Russian Navy	Groznyy		Project 58 Groznyy-class cruiser	Scrapped	
30 June	Russian Navy	Admiral Fokin		Project 58 Groznyy-class cruiser	Scrapped	
30 June	Russian Navy	Admiral Isakov		Project 1134A Berkut A cruiser	Scrapped	
30 June	Russian Navy	Admiral Oktyabrsky		Project 1134A Berkut A cruiser	Scrapped	
30 June	Russian Navy	Kiev		Kiev-class aircraft carrier	Sold to a Chinese company in 1996	
30 June	Russian Navy	Vasily Chapaev		Project 1134A Berkut A cruiser	Scrapped	
10 July	United States Navy	Ranger		Forrestal-class aircraft carrier	Scrapped	
31 July	United States Navy	Iwo Jima		Iwo Jima-class amphibious assault ship	Scrapped	
23 August	Royal Navy	Kellington		Ton-class minesweeper	Handed over to the Sea Cadets	
10 September	United States Navy	Forrestal		Forrestal-class aircraft carrier	Scrapped	
15 September	Hellenic Navy	Kanaris		Themistoklis-class destroyer	Scrapped	
27 September	Japan Maritime Self-Defense Force	Teruzuki		Akizuki-class destroyer		
30 September	Royal Navy	Amazon		Amazon-class frigate	Recommissioned by Pakistan as PNS Babur	
3 December	Royal Canadian Navy	Mackenzie		Mackenzie-class destroyer	Scuttled as an artificial reef 1995	
3 December	Royal Canadian Navy	Yukon		Mackenzie-class destroyer	Scuttled as an artificial reef 2000	
7 December	Japan Maritime Self-Defense Force	Akizuki		Akizuki-class destroyer		
December	Royal Navy	Scylla		Leander-class frigate	Sunk as artificial reef in 2004	
Date uncertain	Pakistan Navy	Babur		County-class destroyer	Scrapped	

== Bibliography ==
- Friedman, Norman (2006). British Destroyers and Frigates, the Second World War and After. Annapolis, Maryland: Naval Institute Press. ISBN 1-86176-137-6.
