= Soviet frigate Svirepyy =

Krivak-class frigate

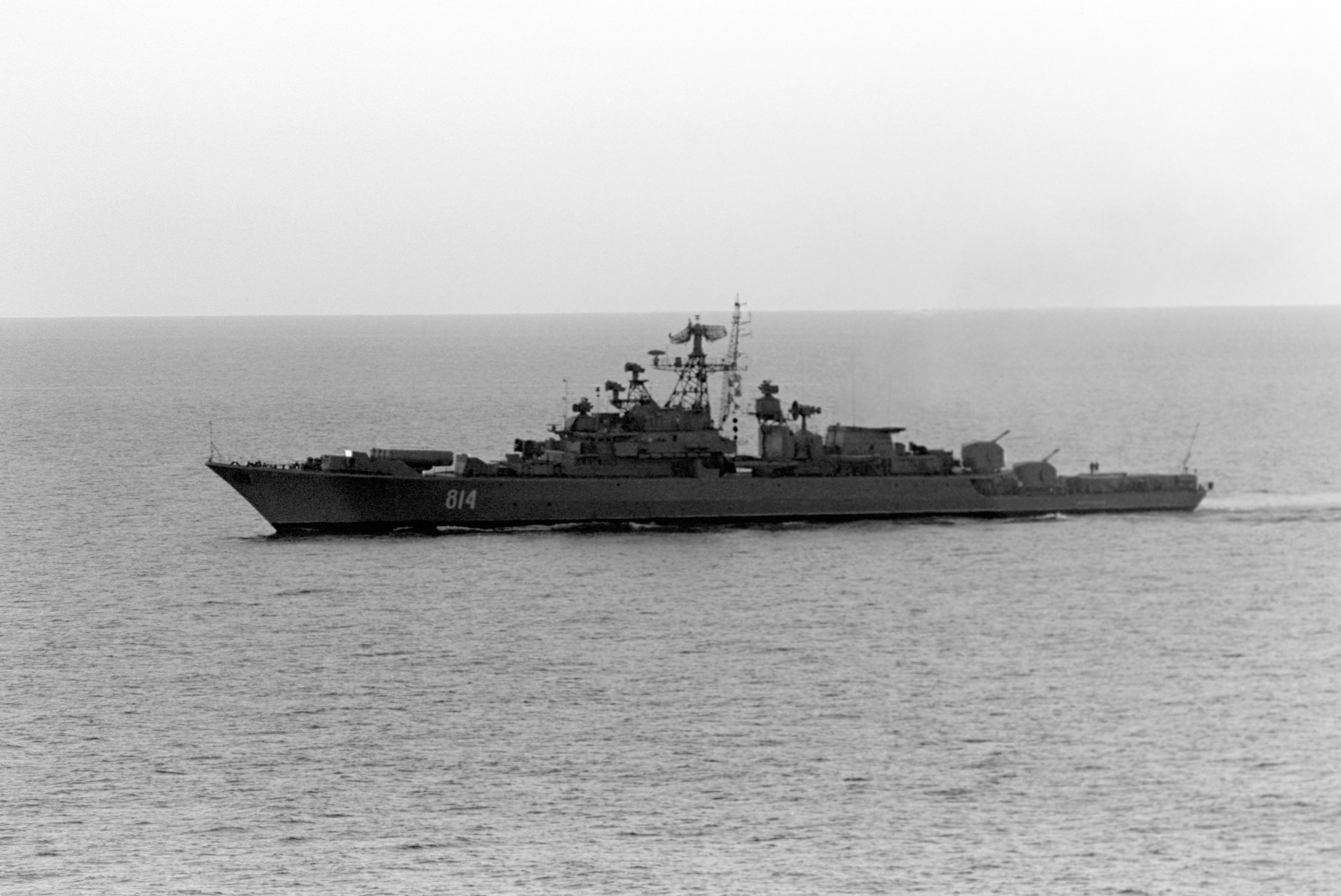
- Sister ship Deyatelnyy in 1988

History

Soviet Union
- Name: Svirepyy
- Namesake: Russian for Ferocious
- Builder: Yantar Shipyard
- Yard number: 716
- Laid down: 15 June 1970
- Launched: 27 January 1971
- Commissioned: 29 December 1972
- Decommissioned: 30 June 1993
- Fate: Broken up

General characteristics
- Class & type: Project 1135 Burevestnik frigate
- Displacement: 2,810 t (2,770 long tons; 3,100 short tons) (standard); 3,200 t (3,100 long tons; 3,500 short tons) (full load)
- Length: 123 m (403 ft 7 in)
- Beam: 142 m (465 ft 11 in)
- Draft: 4.5 m (14 ft 9 in)
- Installed power: 48,000 shp (36,000 kW)
- Propulsion: 4 gas turbines; COGAG; 2 shafts
- Speed: 32 kn (59 km/h)
- Range: 4,000 nmi (7,408 km) at 14 kn (26 km/h)
- Complement: 23 officers, 174 men
- Sensors & processing systems: MR-310A Angara-A air/surface search radar; Volga and Don navigational radars; MG-332 Titan-2, MG-325 Vega, 2 MG-7 Braslet and MGS-400K sonars
- Electronic warfare & decoys: PK-16 decoy-dispenser system
- Armament: 4 × URPK-3 Metel (SS-N-14 'Silex') anti-submarine missiles (1×4); 4 × ZIF-122 4K33 launchers (2×2) with 40 4K33 OSA-M (SA-N-4'Gecko') surface to air missiles; 4 × 76 mm (3 in) AK-726 guns (2×2); 2 × RBU-6000 Smerch-2 anti-submarine rockets; 8 × 533 mm (21 in) torpedo tubes (2×4); 18 mines

Svirepyy (Russian: Свирепый, "Ferocious") was a Project 1135 Burevestnik-class Large Anti-Submarine Ship (Большой Противолодочный Корабль, BPK) or Krivak-class frigate that served with the Soviet Navy. Displacing 3,200 tonnes (3,100 long tons; 3,500 short tons) full load, the vessel was built around the Metel anti-submarine missile system. The ship was launched on 27 January 1971 in Kaliningrad and joined the Baltic Fleet. The ship's service was not restricted to the Baltic Sea and instead travelled widely, visiting a number of foreign friendly ports during the next two decades, including Gdynia, Poland and Havana, Cuba. Svirepyy was designated a Guard Ship (Сторожевой Корабль, SKR) from 1977 as Soviet strategy changed to one creating safe areas for friendly submarines close to the coast. However, the ship continued to travel widely, including trips to the capital cities of both Finland and Tunisia as well as Rostock in East Germany. Svirepyy was transferred to the Russian Navy after the dissolution of the Soviet Union, but did not last long before being decommissioned on 30 June 1993 and subsequently broken up.

== Design and development ==
Svirepyy was one of twenty-one Project 1135 ships launched between 1970 and 1981. Project 1135, the Burevestnik (Russian: Буревестник, "Petrel") class, was envisaged by the Soviet Navy as a less expensive complement to the Project 1134A Berkut A (NATO reporting name 'Kresta II') and Project 1134B Berkut B (NATO reporting name 'Kara') classes of ships. The design was originally given to TsKB-340, which had designed the earlier Project 159 (NATO reporting name 'Petya') and Project 35 (NATO reporting name 'Mirka') classes. However, the expansion in the United States Navy (USN) ballistic missile submarine fleet, and the introduction of longer-ranged and more accurate submarine-launched ballistic missiles led to a revisit of the project, which was transferred to TsKB-53 in Leningrad. The design, by N. P. Sobolov, combined a powerful missile armament with good seakeeping for a blue water role and shared the same BPK designation as the larger ships. This was amended to Guard Ship (Сторожевой Корабль, SKR) from 28 July 1977 to reflect the change in Soviet strategy of creating protected areas for friendly submarines close to the coast. NATO forces called the new class 'Krivak' class frigates.

Displacing 2,810 tonnes (2,770 long tons; 3,100 short tons) standard and 3,200 t (3,100 long tons; 3,500 short tons) full load, Svirepyy was 123 m (403 ft 7 in) long overall, with a beam of 14.2 m (46 ft 7 in) and a draught of 4.5 m (14 ft 9 in). Power was provided by two M7 sets, each consisting of a combination of a 18,000-shaft-horsepower (13,000 kW) DK59 and a 6,000 shp (4,500 kW) M62 gas turbine combined in a COGAG installation and driving one fixed-pitch propeller. Design speed was 32 knots (59 km/h; 37 mph) and range 3,950 nautical miles (7,315 km; 4,546 mi) at 14 kn (26 km/h; 16 mph). The ship's complement was 197, including 23 officers.

=== Armament and sensors ===
Svirepyy had a primary mission of anti-submarine warfare and for this end was equipped with four URPK-3 Metel missiles (NATO reporting name SS-N-14 Silex), backed up by two quadruple torpedo tube mounts for 533 mm (21 in) torpedoes and a pair of 213 mm (8.4 in) RBU-6000 Smerch-2 anti-submarine rocket launchers. Defence against aircraft was provided by forty 4K33 OSA-M (SA-N-4 'Gecko') surface-to-air missiles which were launched from two sets of ZIF-122 launchers, each capable of launching two missiles. Two twin 76 mm (3 in) AK-726 guns were mounted aft. Provision was made for carrying 18 mines.

Svirepyy had a well-equipped sensor suite, including a single MR-310A Angara-A air/surface search radar, Volga and Don-2 navigation radars, the MP-401S Start-S ESM radar system and the Spectrum-F laser warning system. An extensive sonar complex was fitted, including MG-332 Titan-2, which was mounted in a bow radome, and MG-325 Vega. The latter was a towed-array sonar specifically developed for the class and had a range of up to 15 kilometres (9.3 mi). The ship was also equipped with the PK-16 decoy-dispenser system.

== Construction and career ==
Svirepyy was laid down by the Yantar shipyard in Kaliningrad on 15 June 1970, the third of the class to be constructed by the shipbuilder, and was allocated the yard number 151. The vessel was named for the Russian word for Ferocious or Fierce. Launched on 27 January 1971 and commissioned on 29 December 1972, the vessel was accepted into the Baltic Fleet.

Although the vessel saw no combat, Svirepyy was used extensively to fly the flag during the Cold War by visiting countries within the Soviet sphere of influence, including travelling beyond the Baltic Sea. Between 20 and 24 July 1974, the ship docked at Gdynia, Poland, and crossed the Atlantic Ocean to visit Havana, Cuba, between 22 and 27 August 1976. The vessel returned during the following decade to spend four days each in Havana from 15 April 1981 and in Gdynia from 19 July 1984. The ship also travelled to the Mediterranean Sea and visited Tunis, Tunisia, from 26 May 1983, returning to the Baltic to call at Helsinki, Finland, for four days starting on 11 June 1984, as well as spending time in Rostock, East Germany, between 5 and 9 October 1989.

A typical visit was the one to Gdynia from 24 April 1987. The vessel arrived along with the Project 58 Large Missile Ship (Kynda-class cruiser) Groznyy and was greeted by senior representatives of the East German Volksmarine and troops of the National People's Army. The trip included a tour of the city and festivities designed to fortify the relationship between the Soviet Union and its ally. The visits were termed "friendly" and were frequently part of a wider programme of activity. For example, the 1984 Finnish visit preceded an arts festival in the city focused on Russian music.

With the dissolution of the Soviet Union on 26 December 1991, the ship was transferred to the Russian Navy, but operation in that service did not last long. Suffering from high levels of wear, on 30 June 1993, Svirepyy was decommissioned and sold to a firm in the United Kingdom to be broken up the following year. The ship was towed to India for disposal in November 1994.
