= Soviet ship Varyag =

At least two ships in the Soviet Navy have been named Varyag after the Varangian people, the Viking ancestors of the Rus.

- Soviet cruiser Varyag (1963) - A Kynda-class missile cruiser completed in 1965, and decommissioned in 1990.
- Soviet aircraft carrier Varyag - A Kuznetsov-class heavy aircraft carrying cruiser launched by the Soviet Navy in 1988, transferred incomplete to Ukraine in 1992, and sold to China in 1998, where she was finished and commissioned into the Chinese People's Liberation Army Navy as Liaoning in 2012.
