= List of ship commissionings in 1965 =

The list of ship commissionings in 1965 includes a chronological list of all ships commissioned in 1965.

	Operator	Ship	Flag	Class and type	Pennant	Other notes
16 January	United States Navy	Guam		Iwo Jima-class amphibious assault ship	LPH-9	
8 May	United States Navy	Josephus Daniels		Belknap-class cruiser	CG-27	
21 May	United States Navy	America		Kitty Hawk-class aircraft carrier	CVA-66	
19 June	United States Navy	Ogden		Austin-class amphibious transport dock	LPD-5	
3 July	United States Military Sea Transportation Service	Kula Gulf		Commencement Bay-class aircraft transport	T-AKV-8	Placed in service from United States Navy reserve
14 August	Baltic Shipping Company	Alexandr Pushkin	Soviet Union	Ivan Franko-class passenger ship		
20 August	Soviet Navy	Varyag		Project 58 Groznyy-class cruiser	343	
23 August	United States Military Sea Transportation Service	Point Cruz		Commencement Bay-class aircraft transport	T-AKV-19	Placed in service from United States Navy reserve
1 December	United States Navy	Davidson		Garcia-class destroyer escort	FF-1045	
18 December	United States Navy	Duluth		Austin-class amphibious transport dock	LPD-6	
