= Soviet cruiser Admiral Golovko =

Missile cruiser of the Soviet Navy

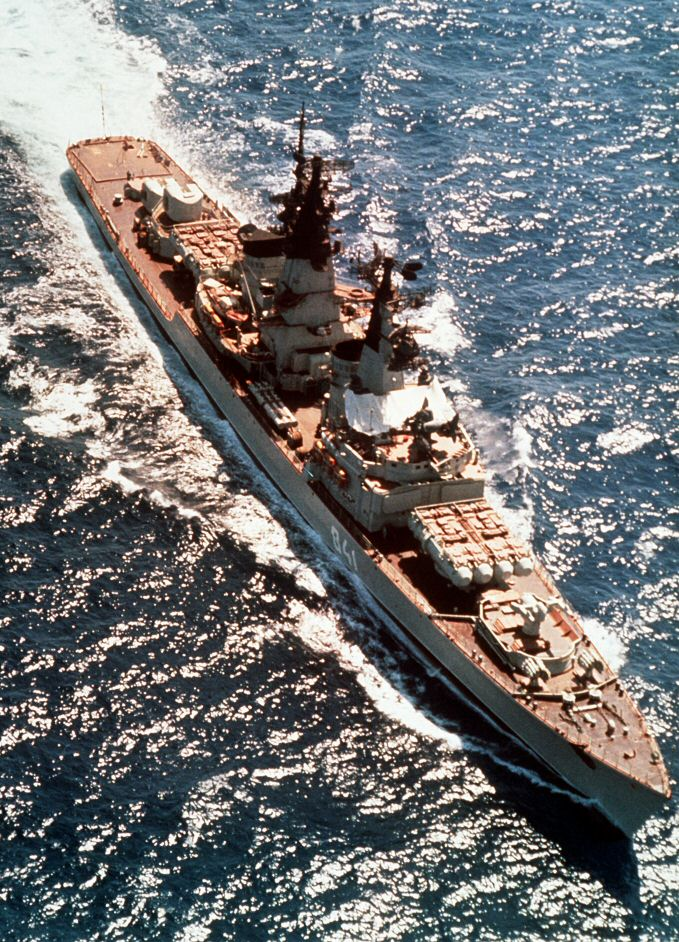
- Admiral Golovko on 18 September 1990.

History

Soviet Union, Russia
- Name: Admiral Golovko
- Namesake: Arseniy Golovko
- Builder: A.A. Zhdanov, Leningrad
- Yard number: 782
- Laid down: 20 April 1961
- Launched: 18 July 1962
- Commissioned: 30 December 1964
- Decommissioned: December 2002
- Fate: Broken up, 2004

General characteristics
- Class & type: Groznyy-class cruiser
- Displacement: 4,350 tonnes (4,280 long tons) standard; 5,400 tonnes (5,300 long tons) full load
- Length: 142.7 m (468 ft 2 in)
- Beam: 16 m (52 ft 6 in)
- Draft: 5.01 m (16 ft 5 in)
- Propulsion: 2 shaft; 4 x KVN-95/64 boilers, 2 x TV-12 GTZA steam turbines, 45,000 shp (34,000 kW)
- Speed: 34 knots (63 km/h; 39 mph)
- Range: 4,500 nmi (8,334 km; 5,179 mi) at 14.3 knots (26 km/h; 16 mph)
- Complement: 25 officers, 304 other crew
- Sensors & processing systems: 1 × MR-310 Angara air/surface search radar; 1 × Binom, 1 × 4R90 Yatagan, 2 x R-105 Turel fire-control radars; 1 × GS-572 Gerkules-2M sonar
- Electronic warfare & decoys: 2 x Krab-11, 2 x Krab-12 ESM radar system
- Armament: 8 × SM-70 P-35 launchers with 16 4K44 (SS-N-3 'Shaddock’) anti-ship missiles (2x4); 2 × ZIF-102 M-1 launchers with 16 V-600 (SA-N-1 ‘Goa’) surface to air missiles (1x2); 4 × 76 mm (3 in) AK-726 guns (2×2); 2 × 45 mm (2 in) 21KM guns (2x1); 2 × RBU-6000 Smerch-2 Anti-Submarine rockets; 6 × 533 mm (21 in) torpedo tubes (2x3)
- Aircraft carried: 1 × Kamov Ka-25 'Hormone-A' helicopter
- Aviation facilities: Helipad

Admiral Golovko (Russian: Адмирал Головко) was the third Project 58 Groznyy-class guided missile cruiser (Ракетные крейсера проекта, RKR), also known as the Kynda class. Designed for the Soviet Navy, the ship was designed to counter the aircraft carriers of the United States Navy and was therefore fitted with eight launchers for 4K44 (NATO reporting name SS-N-3 'Shaddock') anti-ship missiles. Launched in 1962, the warship initially joined the Northern Fleet. In 1967, the cruiser provided air defence to shipping at the Egyptian port of Alexandria during the Six-Day War and was transferred to the Black Sea Fleet in 1968. During the following years of service, the vessel acted as the flagship for the fleet, particularly while deployed to the Mediterranean Sea. The ship also visited other countries on diplomatic tours, including Algeria and Romania. Modernised between 1982 and 1989, Admiral Golovko acted as the flagship for the Russian Navy's Black Sea Fleet between 1997 and 2000. After over forty years in service, the warship was retired in 2002 and broken up.

== Design and development ==
After his appointment as Commander-in-Chief of the Soviet Navy in 1956, Admiral of the Fleet of the Soviet Union Sergey Gorshkov instigated a new vision for the service with a focus on destroying the aircraft carriers of the United States Navy using anti-ship missiles. Key to this was the development of a weapon system able to operate at long distance. Leadership for the design was given to V. A. Nikitin, The subsequent Project 58 ships were given the designation of Ракетные крейсера проекта (guided missile cruiser) or RKR. They were known as the Kynda-class cruisers to NATO. Out of the four of the planned ten that were constructed, Admiral Golovko was the third to be ordered, approval for the design being given on 6 December 1956.

Displacing 4,350 tonnes (4,280 long tons) standard and 5,300 tonnes (5,200 long tons; 5,800 short tons) full load, Admiral Golovko was 142.7 m (468 ft 2 in) in overall length with a beam of 16 m (52 ft 6 in) and a draught of 5.01 m (16 ft 5 in). Power was provided by two 45,000 horsepower (34,000 kW) TV-12 steam turbines, fuelled by four KVN-95/64 boilers and driving two fixed pitch screws. Design speed was 34 knots (63 km/h; 39 mph), which the ship exceeded, and range was 4,500 nmi (8,334 km; 5,179 mi) at 14.3 knots (26 km/h; 16 mph). The ship's complement consisted of 25 officers and 304 other crew.

The ship was designed for anti-ship warfare around two quadruple SM-70 P-35 launchers for sixteen 4K44 missiles (NATO reporting name SS-N-3 'Shaddock'). To defend against aircraft, the ship was equipped with a single twin ZIF-102 M-1 Volna launcher with sixteen V-600 4K90 (SA-N-1 'Goa') missiles forward and two twin 76 mm (3 in) guns aft, backed up by two single 45 mm (2 in) guns. Defence against submarines was provided by two triple 533 mm (21 in) torpedoes and a pair of RBU-6000 213 mm (8 in) anti-submarine rocket launchers.

Admiral Golovko was equipped a MR-310 Angara (NATO reporting name 'Head Net A') search radar, and one Don (NATO reporting name 'Don Kay') navigational radar. For fire-control purposes, the vessel had a single Binom radar for the surface-to-surface missiles and a 4R90 Yatagan radar (NATO reporting name 'Peel Group') for the surface-to-air missiles. Two R-105 Turel radars supported the AK-726 guns. A Burya fire control system was fitted for the anti-submarine rockets and a Zummer system for the torpedoes. The ship carried two each of the Nickel-KM and Khrom-KM IFF systems and electronic warfare equipment that included two Krab-11 and two Krab-12 radar-jamming devices. A GS-572 Gerkules-2M sonar was also fitted.

In 1975, the missiles were updated, the main radar was upgraded to MR-310A and two Uspekh-U radars were added. Four AK-630 close-in weapon systems were also added in the 1980s to improve anti-missile defence.

== Construction and career ==
Laid down on 20 April 1961 at the A.A. Zhdanov shipyard in Leningrad and Launched 18 July 1962 with the name Doblestnyy (Russian: Доблестный –valiant), the vessel was renamed Admiral Golovko (Russian: Адмирал Головко) on 18 December 1962. Named for the Soviet admiral, Arseny Golovko, the vessel was commissioned into the Soviet Navy on 30 December 1964.

Admiral Golovko was accepted to the Northern Fleet on 22 January 1965 and was initially attached to the 120th Missile Ship Brigade. The vessel formed part of a task force that supported the United Arab Republic in June 1967, particularly providing air defence of shipping in the port of Alexandria during the Six-Day War. Admiral Golovko was transferred to the 150th Missile Ship Brigade in the Black Sea Fleet from 22 March 1968 and visited Algiers, Algeria, between 8 and 13 May 1970 before being transferred to the 70th Anti-Submarine Warfare Brigade in December 1970. Operations in the Black Sea included a visit to Constanța, Romania, in August 1973. In April 1975, the vessel rejoined the 150th Missile Ship Brigade and returned to the Mediterranean Sea with visits to Tunis, Tunisia, between 21 and 26 August 1975 and Latakia, Syria, between 22 and 27 August 1978. The ship was the flagship of the Mediterranean Squadron under Admiral Vladimir Akimov.

Between 4 June 1982 and 1 March 1989, Admiral Golovko was docked at Sevmorzavod, Sevastopol, for repairs and modernisation. Stricken by 1991, the ship was reactivated and served with the Russian Navy from December 1994 as part of the 21st Anti-Submarine Warfare Brigade and then from December 1995 was attached to the 11th Anti-Submarine Warfare Brigade. Replacing Project 1134B Berkut B warship Kerch, the vessel acted as the flagship for the Black Sea Fleet from 1997 to April 2000, being then replaced by Project 1164 Atlant cruiser Moskva. The cruiser was decommissioned in December 2002 and sold to be broken up at Inkerman in 2004.
