= Soviet cruiser Admiral Fokin =

Missile cruiser of the Soviet Navy

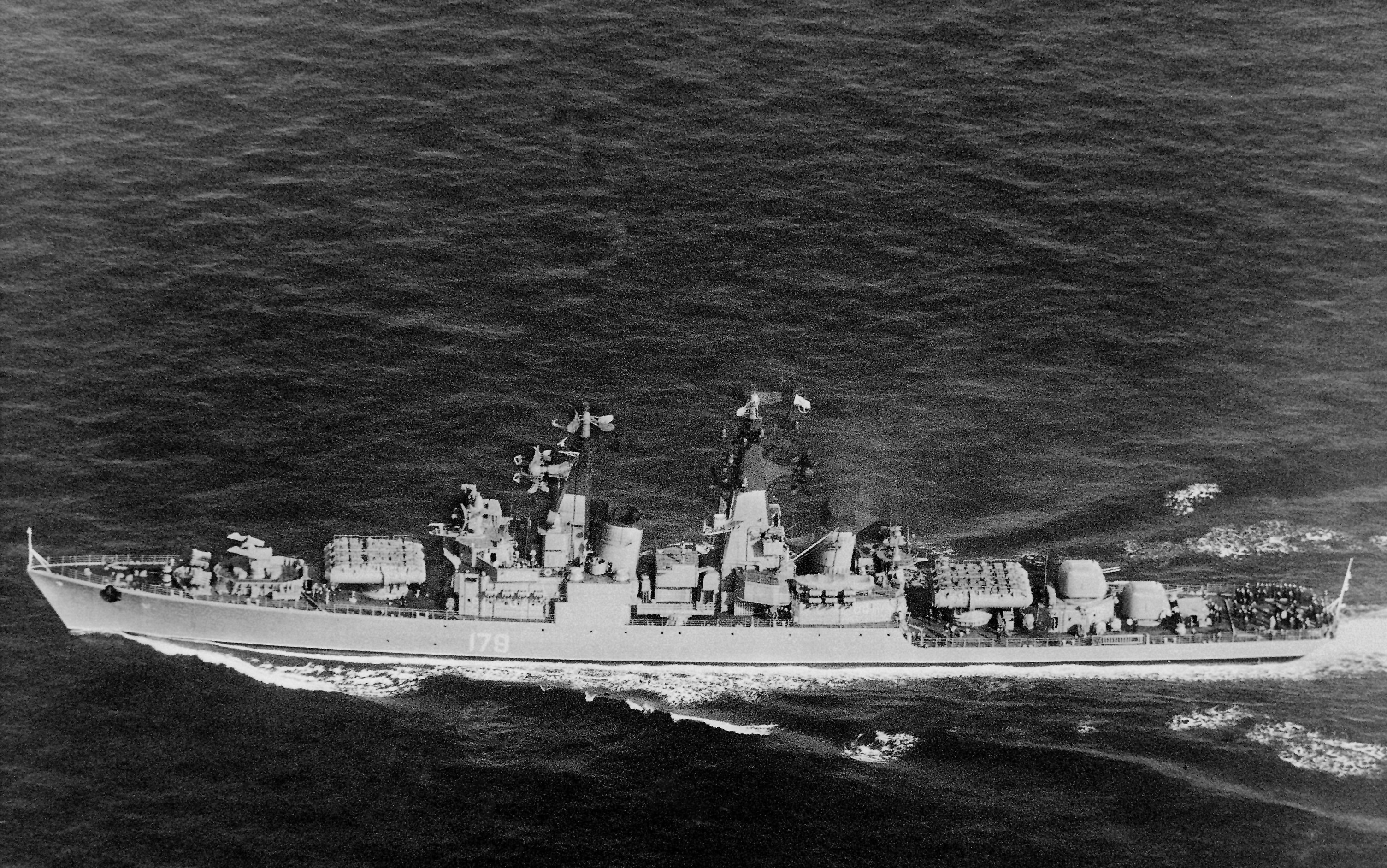
- Sistership Groznyy in 1985

History

Russia
- Name: Admiral Fokin
- Namesake: Vitaliy Alekseyevich Fokin
- Builder: A.A. Zhdanov, Leningrad
- Yard number: 781
- Laid down: 5 October 1960
- Launched: 19 November 1961
- Commissioned: 28 December 1964
- Decommissioned: 30 June 1993
- Fate: Sold to be broken up, 1995

General characteristics
- Class & type: Groznyy class cruiser
- Displacement: 4,350 tonnes (4,280 long tons; 4,800 short tons) standard, 5,400 tonnes (5,300 long tons; 6,000 short tons) full load
- Length: 142.7 m (468 ft)
- Beam: 16 m (52 ft)
- Draft: 5.01 m (16.4 ft)
- Propulsion: 2 shaft; 4 x KVN-95/64 boilers, 2 x TV-12 GTZA steam turbines, 45,000 shp (34,000 kW)
- Speed: 34 knots (63 km/h)
- Range: 4,500 nmi (8,334 km) at 14.3 knots (26 km/h)
- Complement: 25 officers, 304 other crew
- Sensors & processing systems: 1 × MR-310 Angara air/surface search radar; 1 × Binom, 1 × 4R90 Yatagan, 2 x R-105 Turel fire-control radars; 1 × GS-572 Gerkules-2M sonar
- Electronic warfare & decoys: 2 x Krab-11, 2 x Krab-12 ESM radar system
- Armament: 8 × SM-70 P-35 launchers with 16 4K44 (SS-N-3 'Shaddock’) anti-ship missiles (2x4); 2 × ZIF-102 M-1 launchers with 16 V-600 (SA-N-1 ‘Goa’) surface to air missiles (1x2); 4 × 76 mm (3 in) AK-726 guns (2×2); 2 × 45 mm (2 in) 21KM guns (2x1); 2 × RBU-6000 Smerch-2 Anti-Submarine rockets; 6 × 533 mm (21 in) torpedo tubes (2x3)
- Aircraft carried: Helipad for 1 Kamov Ka-25 'Hormone-A'

Admiral Fokin (Russian: Адмирал Фокин) was the second ship of the Soviet Navy Project 58 Groznyy-class Guided Missile Cruisers (Ракетные крейсера проекта, RKR), also known as the Kynda Class. Designed for the Soviet Navy, the ship was designed to counter the aircraft carriers of the United States Navy and was therefore fitted with eight launchers for 4K44 (NATO reporting name SS-N-3 'Shaddock') anti-ship missiles. Launched on 19 November 1961, the vessel served with the Russian Pacific Fleet from the latter half of the 1960s through the 1980s. Between 1968 and 1969, the ship undertook a tour of the Indian Ocean, which included visits to seven foreign countries, subsequently visiting Mauritius in 1970 and 1972. The journeys encompassed more than 60,000 km (37,000 mi) sailing. Admiral Fokin was transferred to the Russian Navy after the dissolution of the Soviet Union, was decommissioned in 1993 and sold to be broken up.

== Design and development ==
After his appointment as Commander-in-Chief of the Soviet Navy in 1956, Admiral of the Fleet of the Soviet Union Sergey Gorshkov instigated a new vision for the service with a focus on destroying the aircraft carriers of the United States Navy using anti-ship missiles. Key to this was the development of a weapon system able to operate at long distance. Leadership for the design was given to V. A. Nikitin, The subsequent Project 58 ships were given the designation of Ракетные крейсера проекта (Guided Missile Cruiser) or RKR. They were known as the Kynda-class cruisers to NATO. Of the four of the planned ten were constructed, Admiral Fokin was the second to be ordered, approval for the design being given on 6 December 1956.

Displacing 4,350 tonnes (4,280 long tons) standard and 5,300 tonnes (5,200 long tons; 5,800 short tons) full load, Admiral Fokin was 142.7 m (468 ft 2 in) in overall length with a beam of 16 m (52 ft 6 in) and a draught of 5.01 m (16 ft 5 in). Power was provided by two 45,000 horsepower (34,000 kW) TV-12 steam turbines, fuelled by four KVN-95/64 boilers and driving two fixed pitch screws. Design speed was 34 knots (63 km/h; 39 mph), which the ship exceeded, and range was 4,500 nmi (8,334 km; 5,179 mi) at 14.3 knots (26 km/h; 16 mph). The ship's complement consisted of 25 officers and 304 other crew.

The ship was designed for anti-ship warfare around two quadruple SM-70 P-35 launchers for sixteen 4K44 missiles (NATO reporting name SS-N-3 'Shaddock'). To defend against aircraft, the ship was equipped with a single twin ZIF-102 M-1 Volna launcher with sixteen V-600 4K90 (SA-N-1 'Goa') missiles forward and two twin 76 mm (3 in) guns aft, backed up by two single 45 mm (2 in) guns. Defence against submarines was provided by two triple 533 mm (21 in) torpedoes and a pair of RBU-6000 213 mm (8 in) anti-submarine rocket launchers.

Admiral Fokin was equipped a MR-310 Angara (NATO reporting name 'Head Net A') search radar, and one Don (NATO reporting name 'Don Kay') navigational radar. For fire-control purposes, the vessel had a single Binom radar for the surface-to-surface missiles and a 4R90 Yatagan radar (NATO reporting name 'Peel Group') for the surface-to-air missiles. Two R-105 Turel radars supported the AK-726 guns. A Burya fire control system was fitted for the anti-submarine rockets and a Zummer system for the torpedoes. The ship carried two each of the Nickel-KM and Khrom-KM IFF systems and electronic warfare equipment that included two Krab-11 and two Krab-12 radar-jamming devices. A GS-572 Gerkules-2M sonar was also fitted.

In 1975, the missiles were updated, the main radar was upgraded to MR-310A and two Uspekh-U radars were added. Four AK-630 close-in weapon systems were also added in the 1980s to improve anti-missile defence.

== Construction and career ==
Laid down on 5 October 1960 at the A.A. Zhdanov shipyard in Leningrad with yard number 781 and launched on 19 November 1961 with the name Steregushyy. (Russian: стерегущий –vigilant), the vessel was renamed Vladivostok (Russian: Владивосто́к – ruler of the east) on 31 October 1962 and eventually received a definitive name of Admiral Fokin (Russian: Адмирал Фокин) on 11 May 1964. Named after the Soviet admiral, Vitaliy Alekseyevich Fokin, the warship was commissioned into the Soviet Navy on 28 December 1964. The ship sailed in 1965 from Severomorsk to Vladivostok to join the 175th Missile Ship Brigade that served in the Pacific Fleet.

At the end of the 1960s, Admiral Fokin toured the Indian Ocean, encompassing visits to seven countries and steaming over 60,000 km (37,000 mi). The tour included stops at Mombasa, Kenya, between 26 November and 2 December 1968, Aden, South Yemen, from 2 to 7 January 1969, Al Hudaydah, North Yemen, from 9 to 12 January, Mumbai, India, during February, and Nairobi, Kenya, between 5 and 9 April. During the last of the visits, over 1,500 people boarded the vessel to meet the crew and see the ship. Between 19 and 23 April 1970, the cruiser was in Port Louis, Mauritius, returning on 10 March 1972 as part of the celebration of nine years of independence. In February and March 1979, Admiral Fokin joined a large fleet of Soviet warships led by Sverdlov-class cruiser Admiral Senyavin that operated in the South China Sea in support of Vietnam during clashes along their border with China. The vessel continued to serve in the Indian Ocean in the 1980s, returning to South Yemen in May 1980.

After the dissolution of the Soviet Union in 1991, Admiral Fokin was briefly transferred to the Russian Navy but did not serve long with the service, being decommissioned on 30 June 1993 and sold to be broken up in 1995.
