= Vitaly Fokin =

Soviet naval admiral

Vitaly Alekseyevich Fokin
- Виталий Алексеевич Фо́кин
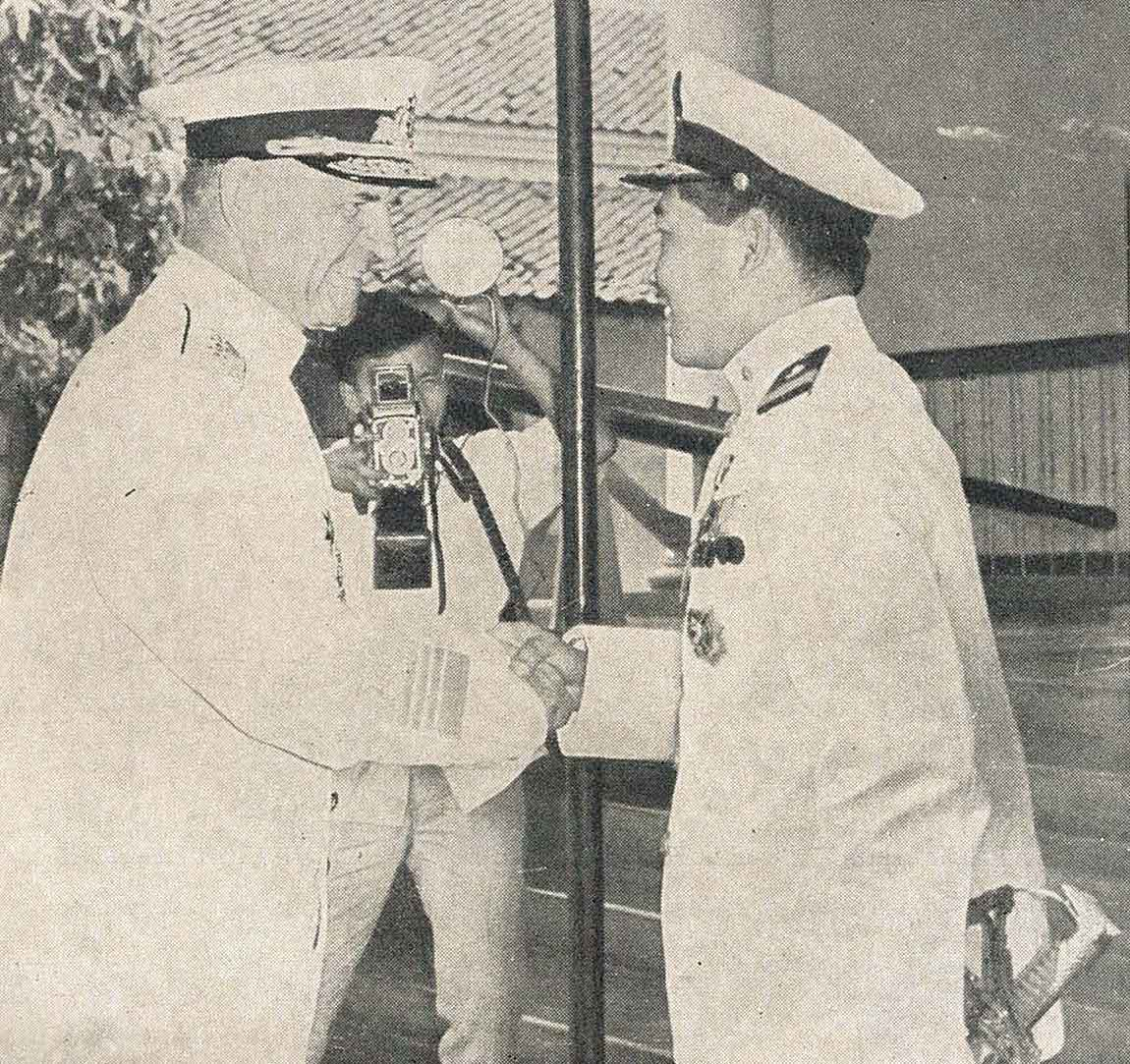
- Admiral Fokin (left) with Indonesian Admiral Eddy Martadinata in January 1960
- Born: March 17, 1906; Pyshchugsky District, Russian Empire
- Died: January 23, 1964 (aged 57); Moscow, Soviet Union
- Burial place: Novodevichy Cemetery
- Military career
- Allegiance: Soviet Union
- Branch: Soviet Navy
- Service years: 1927-1962
- Rank: Admiral
- Commands: Pacific Fleet
- Conflicts: World War II
- Awards: Order of Lenin; Orders of the Red Banner (4); Order of Nakhimov, 1st Class; Order of Ushakov, 2nd Class; Order of the Red Star

Vitaly Alekseyevich Fokin (Виталий Алексеевич Фо́кин) (17 March 1906 – 23 January 1964) was a Soviet admiral and the first deputy commander of the Soviet Navy.

== Naval career ==
A worker's son, Vitaliy Alekseyevich Fokin joined the Soviet Navy when he was 16 in 1922. He served as a deck officer aboard the cruiser Aurora from 1927 and commanded the destroyer Uritskiy from 1941 to 1944. In 1944, the squadron that he commanded took part in the capture of the German base in Kirkenes, Norway.

He was appointed chief of staff of the Northern Fleet in 1947, rising up the ranks to become commander of the Pacific Fleet in 1958 and then first deputy commander of the Soviet Navy between 1962 and 1964. Admiral Fokin was a moderniser and was instrumental to the development of the Soviet submarine launched ballistic missile deterrent. In the run up to the Cuban Missile Crisis, he said to his submarine commanders, "If they slap you on the left cheek, do not let them slap you on the right one."

== Ranks ==
- Rear Admiral (25 September 1944)
- Vice-Admiral (11 May 1949)
- Admiral (3 August 1953)

== Political career ==
Admiral Fokin was made a member of the Central Committee of the Communist Party of the Soviet Union in 1961 and a deputy in the Supreme Soviet of the Soviet Union in 1962.

== Honours, awards and decorations ==
- Order of Lenin (1948)
- Order of the Red Banner (four times 1942, 1943, 1944, 1952)
- Order of Nakhimov First degree (1945)
- Order of Ushakov Second degree (1944)
- Order of the Red Star (1935)

== See also ==
The following have been named after Admiral Fokin:

- Soviet cruiser Admiral Fokin
- Fokino, Primorsky Krai, home to the Russian Pacific Fleet
- Admiral Fokin Street in Vladivostok
