= Soviet cruiser Varyag =

Guided missile cruiser (1965–1990)

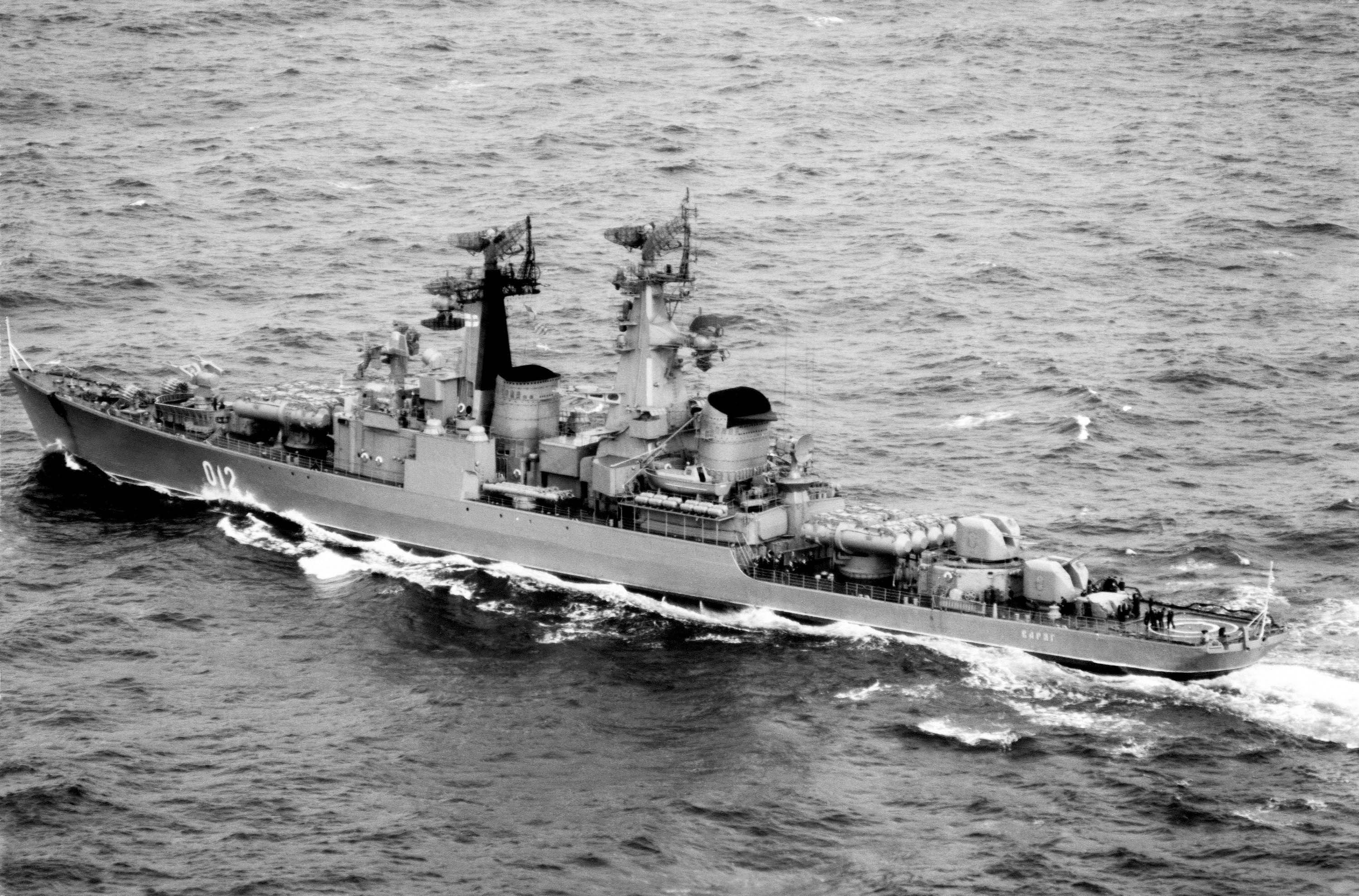
- Varyag on 9 September 1989.

History

Soviet Union
- Name: Varyag
- Namesake: Varangians
- Builder: A.A. Zhdanov, Leningrad
- Yard number: 783
- Laid down: 13 October 1961
- Launched: 7 April 1963
- Commissioned: 20 August 1965
- Decommissioned: 19 April 1990
- Stricken: April 1990
- Fate: Scrapped

General characteristics
- Class & type: Groznyy class cruiser
- Displacement: 4,350 tonnes (4,280 long tons; 4,800 short tons) standard, 5,400 tonnes (5,300 long tons; 6,000 short tons) full load
- Length: 142.7 m (468 ft)
- Beam: 16 m (52 ft)
- Draft: 5.01 m (16.4 ft)
- Propulsion: 2 shaft; 4 x KVN-95/64 boilers, 2 x TV-12 GTZA steam turbines, 45,000 shp (34,000 kW)
- Speed: 34.5 knots (64 km/h)
- Range: 4,500 nmi (8,334 km) at 14.3 knots (26 km/h)
- Complement: 25 officers, 304 men
- Sensors & processing systems: 2 x MR-300 Angara air/surface search radars, 1 x Bizan, 1 x MRP-11-12, 2 x MRP-13-14 and 2 x MRP-15-16 Zaliv reconnaissance radars, 1 x Don navigation radar, 2 x Nickel-KM and 2 x Khrom-KM IFF, 1 x Vizir-1 and 1 x GS-572 Gerkules-2M sonar
- Electronic warfare & decoys: 2 x Krab-11, 2 x Krab-12 ESM radar system
- Armament: 8 × SM-70 P-35 launchers with 16 4K44 (SS-N-3 'Shaddock’) anti-ship missiles (2x4); 2 × ZIF-102 M-1 launchers with 16 V-600 (SA-N-1 ‘Goa’) surface to air missiles (1x2); 4 × 76 mm (3 in) AK-726 guns (2×2); 2 × 45 mm (2 in) 21KM guns (2x1); 2 × RBU-6000 Smerch-2 Anti-Submarine rockets; 6 × 533 mm (21 in) torpedo tubes (2x3)
- Aircraft carried: Helipad for 1 Kamov Ka-25 'Hormone-A'

Varyag (Russian: Варяг) was the fourth and final ship of the Soviet Navy Project 58 Groznyy-class Guided Missile Cruisers (Ракетные крейсера проекта, RKR), also known as the Kynda Class.

== Design ==
Displacing 4,350 tonnes (4,280 long tons; 4,800 short tons) standard and 5,300 tonnes (5,200 long tons; 5,800 short tons) full load, Varyag was 142.7 m (468 ft) in length. Power was provided by two 45,000 horsepower (34,000 kW) TV-12 steam turbines, fuelled by four KVN-95/64 boilers and driving two fixed pitch screws. Top speed was 34.5 knots (64 km/h).

The ship was designed for anti-ship warfare around two quadruple SM-70 P-35 launchers for 4K44 missiles (NATO reporting name SS-N-3 'Shaddock’), the vessel carrying a full set of reloads making a total of sixteen missiles. To defend against aircraft, the ship was equipped with a single twin ZIF-102 M-1 Volna launcher with sixteen V-600 4K90 (SA-N-1 ‘Goa’) missiles forward and two twin 76 mm (3 in) guns aft, backed up by two single 45 mm (2 in) guns. Four AK-630 close-in weapon systems were added in the early 1980s. Defence against submarines was provided by two triple 533 mm (21 in) torpedoes and a pair of RBU-6000 213 mm (8 in) anti-submarine rocket launchers.

== Service ==
Laid down 13 October 1961 with the name Soobrazitelnyy (Russian: Сообразительный – Astute), the vessel was renamed Varyag on 31 October 1962 while under construction.

Varyag was launched on 7 April 1963 and accepted to the Pacific Fleet on 23 September 1965 as part of the 175th Anti-Submarine Warfare Brigade, sailing to Vladivostok via the northern sea route. The vessel served in the Indian Ocean between 13 December 1971 and 6 March 1972 as part of a substantial Soviet naval presence during the Indo-Pakistani War ostensibly as a counterweight to ensure non-intervention by the Royal Navy and US Navy. Between 1975 and 1981, Varyag underwent repairs and modernisation, returning to service in the Indian Ocean with a cruise that included a visit to Da Nang, Vietnam between 10 and 14 October 1981. The ship was attached to the 183rd Anti-Submarine Warfare Brigade from 1 March 1985, taking part in a large surface fleet exercise with other Soviet vessels between 7 and 10 October 1988.

Varyag was the first in the class to be decommissioned, being stricken in April 1990.

== Pennant numbers ==
Pennant number	Date
343	1965
280	1965
621	1966
822	1967
835	1968
830	1970
835	1972
836	1974
015	1976
049	1981
047	1982
043	1985
012	1987
032	1990
641	
821	
079	
