= Arseny Golovko =

Admiral of the Fleet of the Soviet Union

Arseniy Golovko
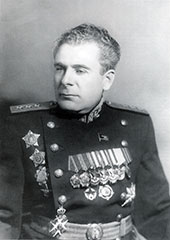
- Born: Arseny Grigoriyevich Golovko; 10 June 1906; Prokhladny, Terek Oblast, Russian Empire
- Died: 17 May 1962 (aged 55) Moscow, Soviet Union
- Allegiance: Soviet Union
- Branch: Soviet Navy
- Service years: 1925–1962
- Rank: Admiral
- Commands: Northern Fleet, Baltic Fleet, Caspian Flotilla, Amur Military Flotilla
- Conflicts: World War II
- Awards: Order of Lenin (four times); Order of Ushakov (twice); Order of Nakhimov; Order of the Red Banner (four times); Order of the Red Star (twice)

Arseny Grigoryevich Golovko (Russian: Арсений Григорьевич Головко; 10 June 1906 – 17 May 1962) was a Soviet admiral, whose naval service extended from the 1920s through the early Cold War.

== Service ==
He entered the Soviet Navy in 1925 and graduated in 1928 from the M.V. Frunze Higher Naval School in Leningrad. After that he served in various Fleet assignments. In 1937 and 1938 he took part in the Spanish Civil War on the side of the Republicans. After his return to the USSR he attended the naval warfare school. From 1940 to 1946, during the Second World War, he was Commander of the Soviet Northern Fleet.

After the war he held various naval commands, among them Commander of the Baltic Fleet. In 1956 he was named First Deputy Commander-in-Chief of the Soviet Navy. He died in 1962.

== Honours and awards ==
For his services, Golovko received the Order of Lenin four times and the Order of the Red Banner four times (twice with the Order of Ushakov). He also was decorated numerous times with other domestic and foreign orders and medals.

- Four Orders of Lenin
- Order of Red Banner, four times
- Order of Ushakov, 1st class, twice
- Order of Nakhimov, 1st class
- Order of the Red Star, twice
- Medal "For the Defence of the Soviet Transarctic"
- Medal "For the Victory over Germany in the Great Patriotic War 1941–1945"
- Jubilee Medal "20 Years of the Workers' and Peasants' Red Army"
- Jubilee Medal "30 Years of the Soviet Army and Navy"
- Jubilee Medal "40 Years of the Armed Forces of the USSR"
- Knight Grand Cross of the Order of St. Olav (1946)

== Personal life ==
His wife was the distinguished Russian actress Kira Golovko. His daughter Natalia Golovko is also an actress.

== Commemoration ==
The Soviet cruiser Admiral Golovko took its name from Arseniy Golovko.
