= Soviet cruiser Groznyy =

Missile cruiser of the Soviet Navy

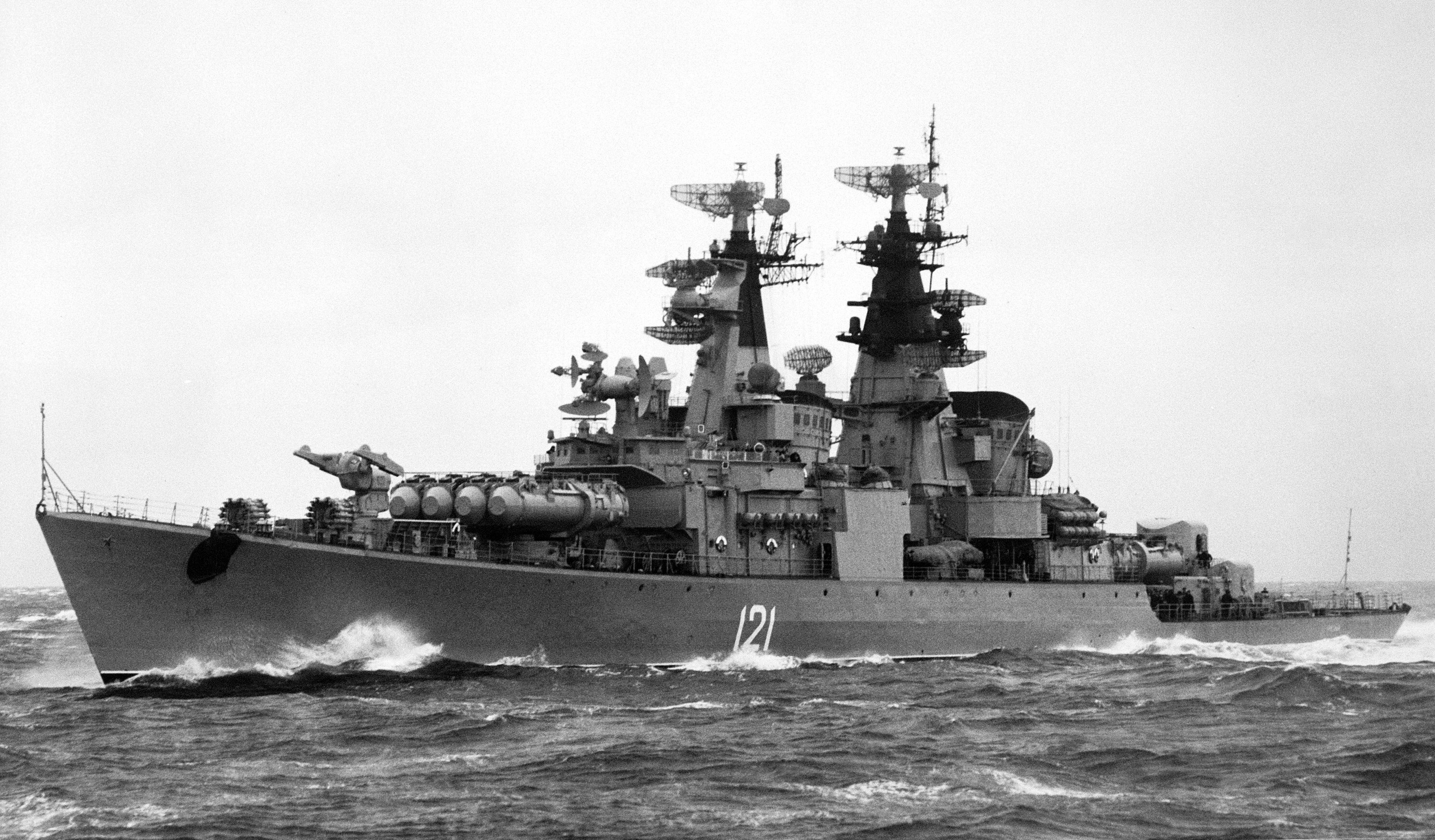
- Groznyy underway on 30 October 1985.

History

Soviet Union
- Name: Groznyy
- Namesake: Groznyy
- Builder: A.A. Zhdanov, Leningrad
- Yard number: 780
- Laid down: 23 February 1960
- Launched: 26 March 1961
- Commissioned: 30 December 1962
- Stricken: 24 June 1991
- Fate: Broken up

General characteristics
- Class & type: Groznyy-class cruiser
- Displacement: 4,350 tonnes (4,280 long tons) standard; 5,400 tonnes (5,300 long tons) full load
- Length: 142.7 m (468 ft 2 in)
- Beam: 16 m (52 ft 6 in)
- Draft: 5.01 m (16 ft 5 in)
- Propulsion: 2 shaft; 4 x KVN-95/64 boilers, 2 x TV-12 GTZA steam turbines, 45,000 shp (34,000 kW)
- Speed: 34 knots (63 km/h; 39 mph)
- Range: 4,500 nmi (8,334 km; 5,179 mi) at 14.3 knots (26 km/h; 16 mph)
- Complement: 25 officers, 304 other crew
- Sensors & processing systems: 1 × MR-310 Angara air/surface search radar; 1 × Binom, 1 × 4R90 Yatagan, 2 x R-105 Turel fire-control radars; 1 × GS-572 Gerkules-2M sonar
- Electronic warfare & decoys: 2 x Krab-11, 2 x Krab-12, Vzryv ESM radar system
- Armament: 8 × SM-70 P-35 launchers with 16 4K44 (SS-N-3 'Shaddock’) anti-ship missiles (2x4); 2 × ZIF-102 M-1 launchers with 16 V-600 (SA-N-1 ‘Goa’) surface to air missiles (1x2); 4 × 76 mm (3 in) AK-726 guns (2×2); 2 × 45 mm (2 in) 21KM guns (2x1); 2 × RBU-6000 Smerch-2 Anti-Submarine rockets; 6 × 533 mm (21 in) torpedo tubes (2x3)
- Aircraft carried: 1 × Kamov Ka-25 'Hormone-A' helicopter
- Aviation facilities: Helipad

Groznyy (Russian: Грозный, lit. 'Fearsome') was the lead ship of the Soviet Navy's Project 58 Groznyy-class guided missile cruisers (Ракетные крейсера проекта, RKR), also known as the Kynda class. The ship was designed to counter the aircraft carriers of the United States Navy and was therefore fitted with eight launchers for 4K44 (NATO reporting name SS-N-3 'Shaddock') anti-ship missiles. Launched in 1961, the warship initially joined the Northern Fleet before being transferred to the Black Sea Fleet the following year. The ship was also used for diplomatic purposes. Between 1967 and 1976, Groznyy undertook seventeen visits to foreign ports, one of the highest in the fleet, traveling as far as Cuba. The ship also tracked United States Navy aircraft carriers in the Mediterranean Sea. After twenty years in service, the vessel was struck in 1991 and subsequently broken up.

== Design and development ==
After his appointment as Commander-in-Chief of the Soviet Navy in 1956, Admiral of the Fleet of the Soviet Union Sergey Gorshkov instigated a new vision for the service with a focus on destroying the aircraft carriers of the United States Navy using anti-ship missiles. Key to this was the development of a weapon system able to operate at long distance. Leadership for the design was given to V. A. Nikitin. The subsequent Project 58 was termed a Ракетные крейсера проекта (guided missile cruiser) or RKR. They were known as the Kynda-class cruisers to NATO. Four of the planned ten were constructed, Groznyy being the first to be ordered, approval for the design being given on 6 December 1956.

Displacing 4,350 tonnes (4,280 long tons) standard and 5,300 tonnes (5,200 long tons; 5,800 short tons) full load, Groznyy was 142.7 m (468 ft 2 in) in overall length with a beam of 16 m (52 ft 6 in) and a draught of 5.01 m (16 ft 5 in). Power was provided by two 45,000 horsepower (34,000 kW) TV-12 steam turbines, fuelled by four KVN-95/64 boilers and driving two fixed-pitch screws. Design speed was 34 knots (63 km/h; 39 mph), which the ship exceeded, and range was 4,500 nmi (8,334 km; 5,179 mi) at 14.3 knots (26 km/h; 16 mph). The ship's complement consisted of 25 officers and 304 other crew.

The ship was designed for anti-ship warfare around two quadruple SM-70 P-35 launchers for sixteen 4K44 missiles (NATO reporting name SS-N-3 'Shaddock'). To defend against aircraft, the ship was equipped with a single twin ZIF-102 M-1 Volna launcher with sixteen V-600 4K90 (SA-N-1 'Goa') missiles forward and two twin 76 mm (3 in) guns aft, backed up by two single 45 mm (2 in) guns. Defence against submarines was provided by two triple 533 mm (21 in) torpedoes and a pair of RBU-6000 213 mm (8 in) anti-submarine rocket launchers.

Groznyy was equipped with an MR-310 Angara (NATO reporting name 'Head Net A') search radar, and one Don (NATO reporting name 'Don Kay') navigational radar. For fire-control purposes, the vessel had a single Binom radar for the surface-to-surface missiles and a 4R90 Yatagan radar (NATO reporting name 'Peel Group') for the surface-to-air missiles. Two R-105 Turel radars supported the AK-726 guns. A Burya fire control system was fitted for the anti-submarine rockets and a Zummer system for the torpedoes. The ship carried two of both the Nickel-KM and Khrom-KM IFF systems and electronic warfare equipment that included two Krab-11, two Krab-12 and one Vzryv radar-jamming devices. A GS-572 Gerkules-2M sonar was also fitted.

In 1975, the missiles were updated, the main radar was upgraded to MR-310A and two Uspekh-U radars were added. Four AK-630 close-in weapon systems were added in the 1980s to improve anti-missile defence.

== Construction and career ==
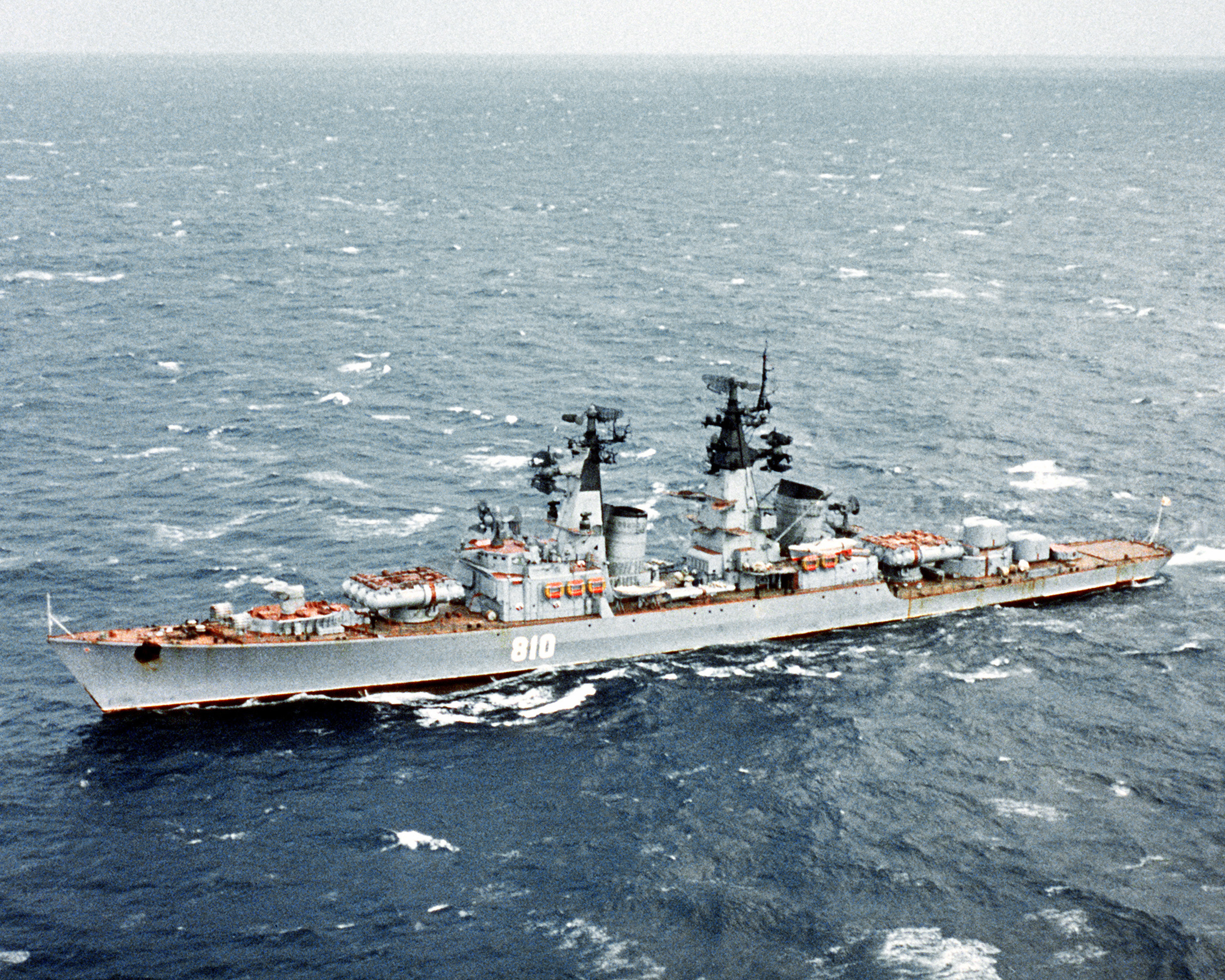
Groznyy in 1990

The lead ship of the Project 58 class, Groznyy (Russian: Грозный) was laid down on 23 February 1960 at the A.A. Zhdanov shipyard in Leningrad with yard number 780 and launched on 26 March 1961. The vessel was commissioned into the Soviet Navy on 30 December 1962. The ship is named for a Russian word that means 'fearsome' and is often translated 'terrible', as in Ivan the Terrible. After visits from General Secretary Nikita Khrushchev and Admiral Gorshkov on 4 May 1962, the ship undertook tests that culminated in the successful launch of two P-35 missiles in front of Khrushchev on 22 July. The ship undertook the first successful deck landing and take-off of the mid-course guidance derivative of the Kamov Ka-25 in 1966 and was transferred to the Black Sea Fleet on 5 October that year.

The ship served globally, including visits to Varna, Bulgaria, in August 1967 and Tartus, Syria, in 1968. In July 1969, the ship departed Sevastapol for a visit to Cuba. Returning to the Mediterranean Sea the following month, the ship participated in a joint exercise with Egyptian and Syrian forces. The ship subsequently visited Split, Yugoslavia, and Alexandria, Egypt, in 1972, Casablanca, Morocco, in April 1972, Marseille, France, in July 1973. Between 9 and 16 October 1973, the ship tracked the aircraft carrier USS Independence at the height of the Yom Kippur War. Overall, in the period between 1967 and 1976, Groznyy undertook seventeen diplomatic visits to foreign ports, one of the highest of any vessel in the fleet.

Groznyy took part in the "Atlantika-84" exercise in the Barents and Norwegian Seas in March 1984 and tracked United States Navy task forces led by the aircraft carriers USS Coral Sea and USS Saratoga as part of operations in the Mediterranean Sea between 9 August 1985 and 4 February 1986. Further visits took place to Rostock, East Germany, in July 1987 and Szczecin, Poland, in July 1988. The cruiser was struck on 24 June 1991 and subsequently broken up.
