= Kynda-class cruiser =

Soviet Navy warship class

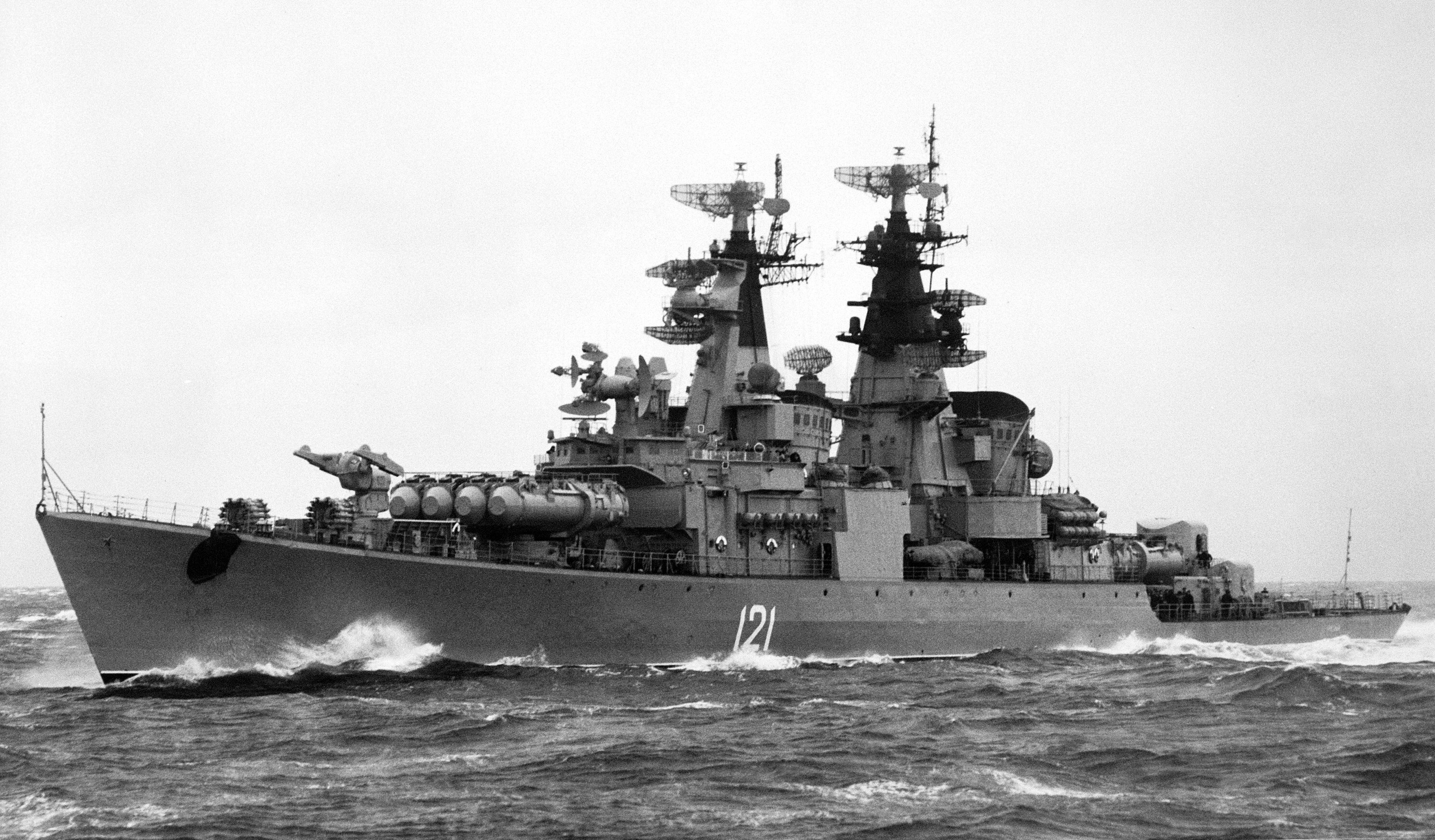
- Groznyy in 1985

Class overview
- Name: Kynda class
- Builders: Zhdanov Shipyard
- Operators: Soviet Navy; Russian Navy
- Preceded by: Sverdlov class
- Succeeded by: Kresta I class
- Built: 1960–1965
- In service: 1962–2002
- Planned: 16
- Completed: 4
- Canceled: 12
- Retired: 4

General characteristics
- Type: Cruiser
- Displacement: 4,400 tons standard, 5,500 tons full load
- Length: 141.7–141.9 m (464 ft 11 in – 465 ft 7 in)
- Beam: 15.8 m (51 ft 10 in)
- Draught: 5.3 m (17 ft 5 in)
- Propulsion: 4 boilers; 2 steam turbines; 100,000 shp (75,000 kW)
- Speed: 34 knots (63 km/h; 39 mph)
- Range: 2,000 nmi (3,700 km; 2,300 mi) at 34 kn (63 km/h; 39 mph); 7,000 nmi (13,000 km; 8,100 mi) at 14.5 kn (26.9 km/h; 16.7 mph)
- Complement: 390
- Armament: ASM: 2×4 SS-N-3b (8+8 missiles); SAM: 1 twin SA-N-1 'Goa' launcher (16 missiles); Guns: 2× 76 mm (3.0 in) AK-726 guns, 4× 30 mm (1.2 in) AK-630 guns; ASW: 2× RBU-6000 launchers; Torpedoes: 2×3 533mm tubes
- Aviation facilities: Helipad

The Project 58 missile cruisers (Ракетные крейсера проекта 58), known to NATO as the Kynda class and sometimes referred to as the Grozny class (тип «Грозный»), from the name of the first ship of the series to be constructed, were the first generation of Soviet missile cruisers and represented a considerable advance for the Soviet Navy. Their main role was anti-surface warfare using the SS-N-3b 'Shaddock' missile. The design proved to be top-heavy and was soon succeeded by the larger Kresta I class, but the Kyndas stayed in service until the fall of the Soviet Union.

== Design ==
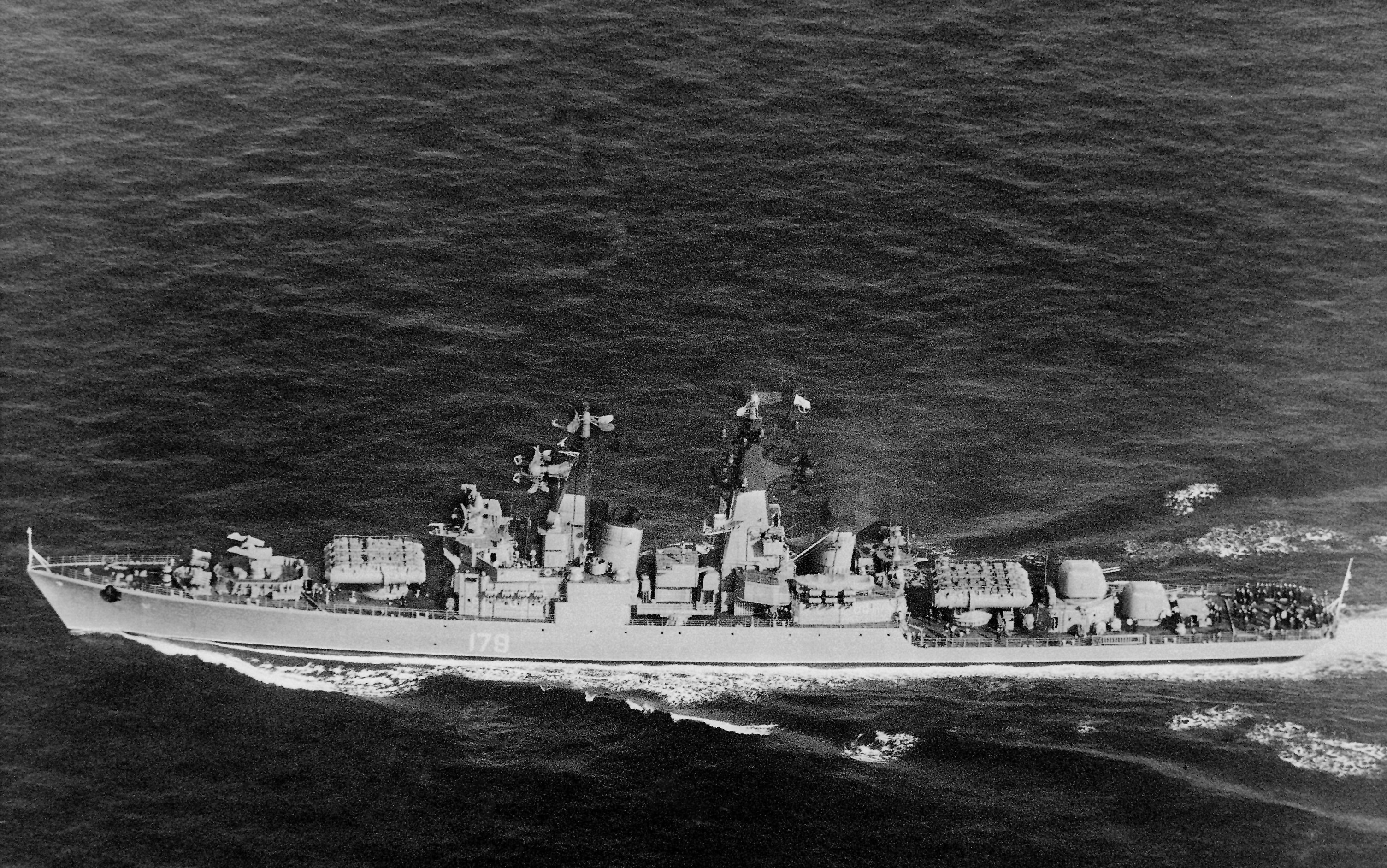
Groznyy during the height of the Cold War, 1985

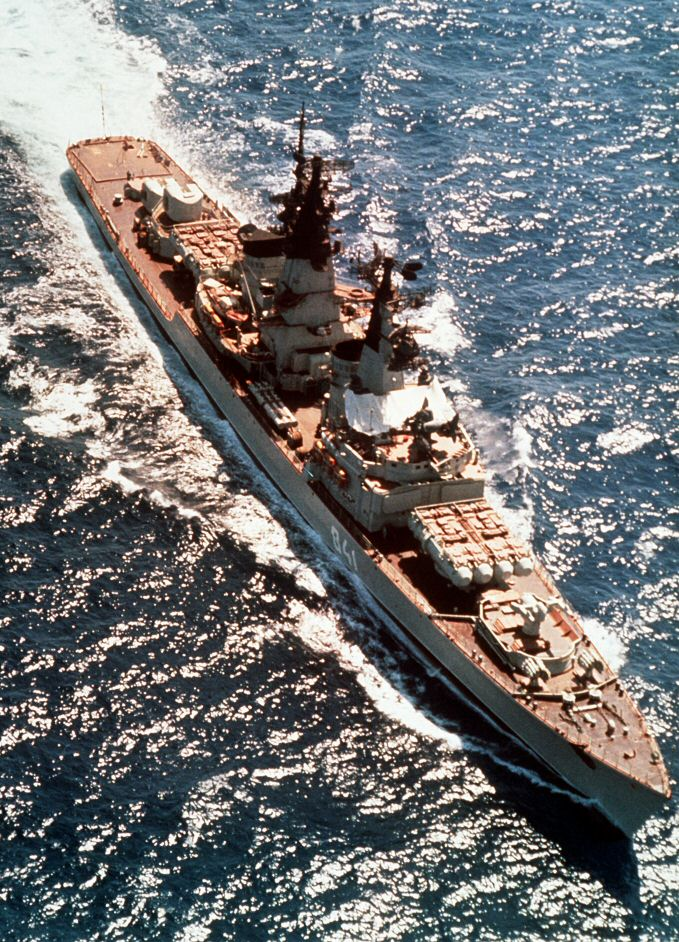
Admiral Golovko in the Mediterranean Sea

The specifications (TTZ in Russian) for this class were issued in 1956.

The main armament comprised two trainable quadruple SS-N-3 anti shipping missile mountings; one forward one aft. One set of reload missiles was carried (16 missiles in total). Defensive armament comprised a twin SA-N-1 missile launcher forward and two twin 76mm AK-726 guns aft. Two RBU-6000 anti submarine rocket launchers and two triple 533-millimetre (21.0 in) torpedo tubes were also fitted. The ships were refitted in the early 1980s with four 30-millimetre (1.2 in) AK-630 close-in weapon systems (CIWS).

Machinery comprised high pressure steam turbines in a unit system with alternating boiler rooms and turbine rooms.

The electronics fit consisted of:

Radar:

- MR-500 Kliver air search
- MR-302 Rubka surface search
- Don DonKay navigation

Sonar:

- GAS-372 Gerkules-2M hull mounted

Other systems:

- Zaliv ESM
- Krab ECM
- Uspekh-U aircraft communications
- Yatagan SA-N-1 fire control (Peel Group SA-N-1 Target Acquisition /Target Tracking/Missile Guidance (TA/TT/MG) array
- MR105 AK-726 fire control (Hawk Screech) Fire Control for 76mm Guns
- Binom P35 Progress fire control

== Ships ==
The ships were ordered in 1956 and laid down in 1960–1961. All four ships were built by the Zhdanov yard in Leningrad. Initially classified as destroyers and given traditional destroyer names, they were redesignated as rocket cruisers and renamed in September 1962. A total of 16 ships were planned but eventually only four were built, one for each fleet (Baltic, Pacific, Arctic, Black sea). This was notably caused by a priority change, directed towards anti-submarine warfare and the ships being top heavy. The class was followed up by the larger Kresta I-class ships, sharing the main design but optimized primarily for ASW warfare.

- Groznyy (Fearsome) (Грозный)

Laid down 23 February 1960
Launched 26 March 1961
Completed 30 December 1962
Served in the Baltic Fleet
Scrapped 1991

- Admiral Fokin (Адмирал Фокин)

Laid down as Steregushchyy (Watchful) on 5 October 1960
Launched 19 November 1961
Completed 1964
Served in the Pacific Fleet
Scrapped 1993

- Admiral Golovko (Адмирал Головко)

Laid down as Doblestnyy (Valorous) on 20 April 1960
Launched 18 July 1962
Renamed on 31 October 1962 after Arseniy Golovko
Completed 1964
From 1995 to 1997 she served as flagship of the Black Sea fleet, before being deactivated and removed from service in 2002.

- Varyag (Варяг)

Laid down as Soobrazitelnyy (Shrewd) on 13 October 1961
Launched 7 April 1963
Completed 1965
Served in the Pacific Fleet
Decommissioned 1990. This ship was featured in a Soviet TV documentary in the late 1970s. There were plans to preserve her as a museum.

== See also ==
- List of ships of the Soviet Navy
- List of ships of Russia by project number
