= S-125 Neva/Pechora =

S-125 Neva NATO reporting name: SA-3 Goa, SA-N-1 Goa
- Peruvian Air Force Pechora.
- Type: Short-range SAM system
- Place of origin: Soviet Union

Service history
- In service: 1961–present
- Used by: See list of present and former operators
- Wars: War of Attrition; Yom Kippur War; Angolan Civil War; Uganda–Tanzania War; Iran–Iraq War; Gulf War; NATO bombing of Yugoslavia; Syrian Civil War; Second Nagorno-Karabakh War; Tigray War; Russian Invasion of Ukraine; 2025 India–Pakistan conflict

Production history
- Designer: Almaz Central Design Bureau
- Designed: 1950s
- Manufacturer: JSC Defense Systems (Pechora-M)
- Produced: 1961–present
- Variants: Neva, Pechora, Volna, Neva-M, Neva-M1, Volna-M, Volna-N, Volna-P, Pechora 2, Pechora 2M, Newa SC, Pechora-M

The S-125 Neva/Pechora (Russian: С-125 "Нева"/"Печора", NATO reporting name SA-3 Goa) is a Soviet surface-to-air missile system that was designed by Aleksei Isaev to complement the S-25 and S-75. It has a shorter effective range and lower engagement altitude than either of its predecessors and also flies slower, but due to its two-stage design it is more effective against more maneuverable targets. It is also able to engage lower flying targets than the previous systems, and being more modern it is much more resistant to ECM than the S-75. The 5V24 (V-600) missiles reach around Mach 3 to 3.5 in flight, both stages powered by solid fuel rocket motors. The S-125, like the S-75, uses radio command guidance. The naval version of this system has the NATO reporting name SA-N-1 Goa and original designation M-1 Volna (Russian Волна – wave).

== Operational history ==
=== Soviet Union ===
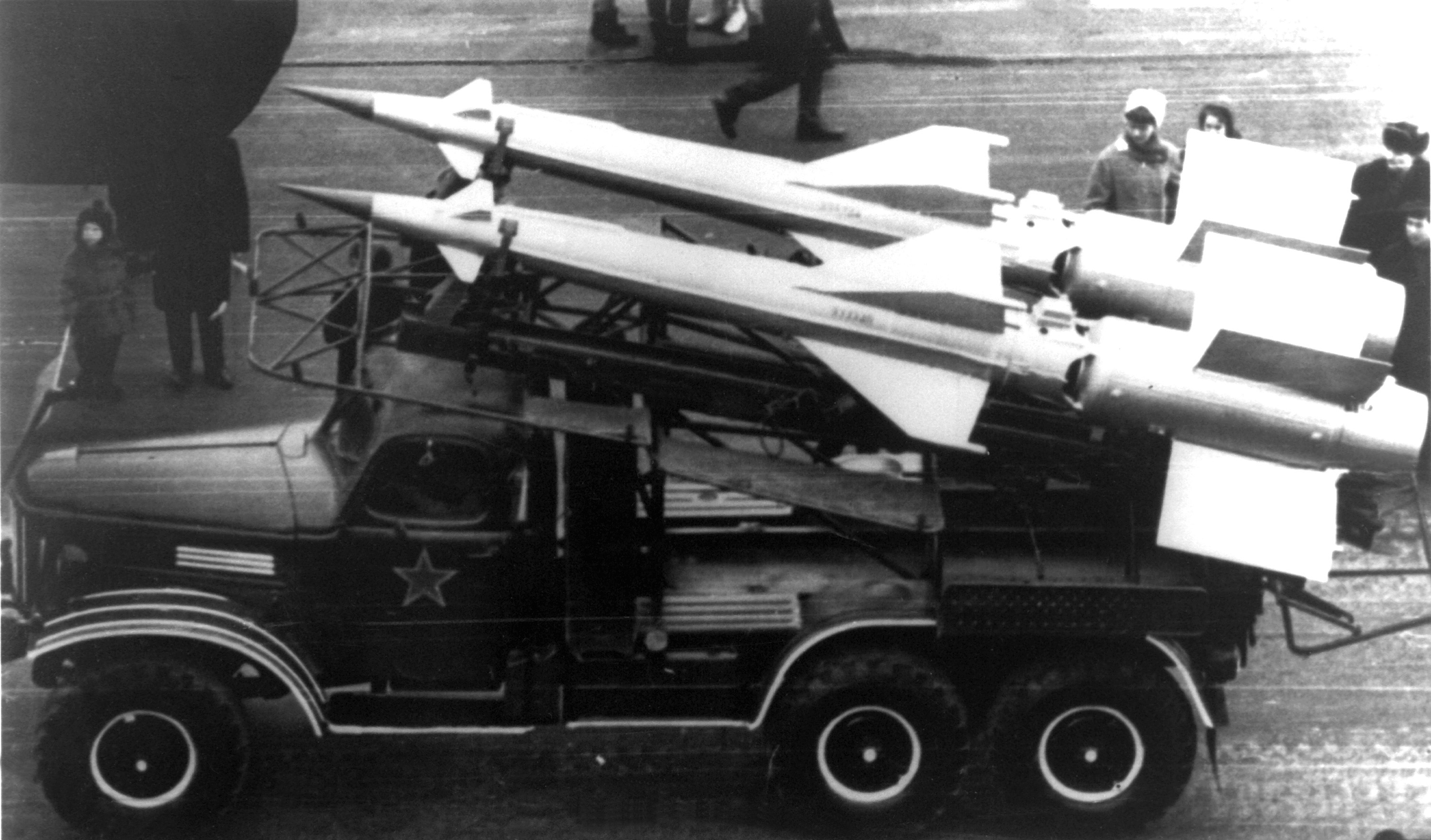
A pair of S-125 missiles in transit.

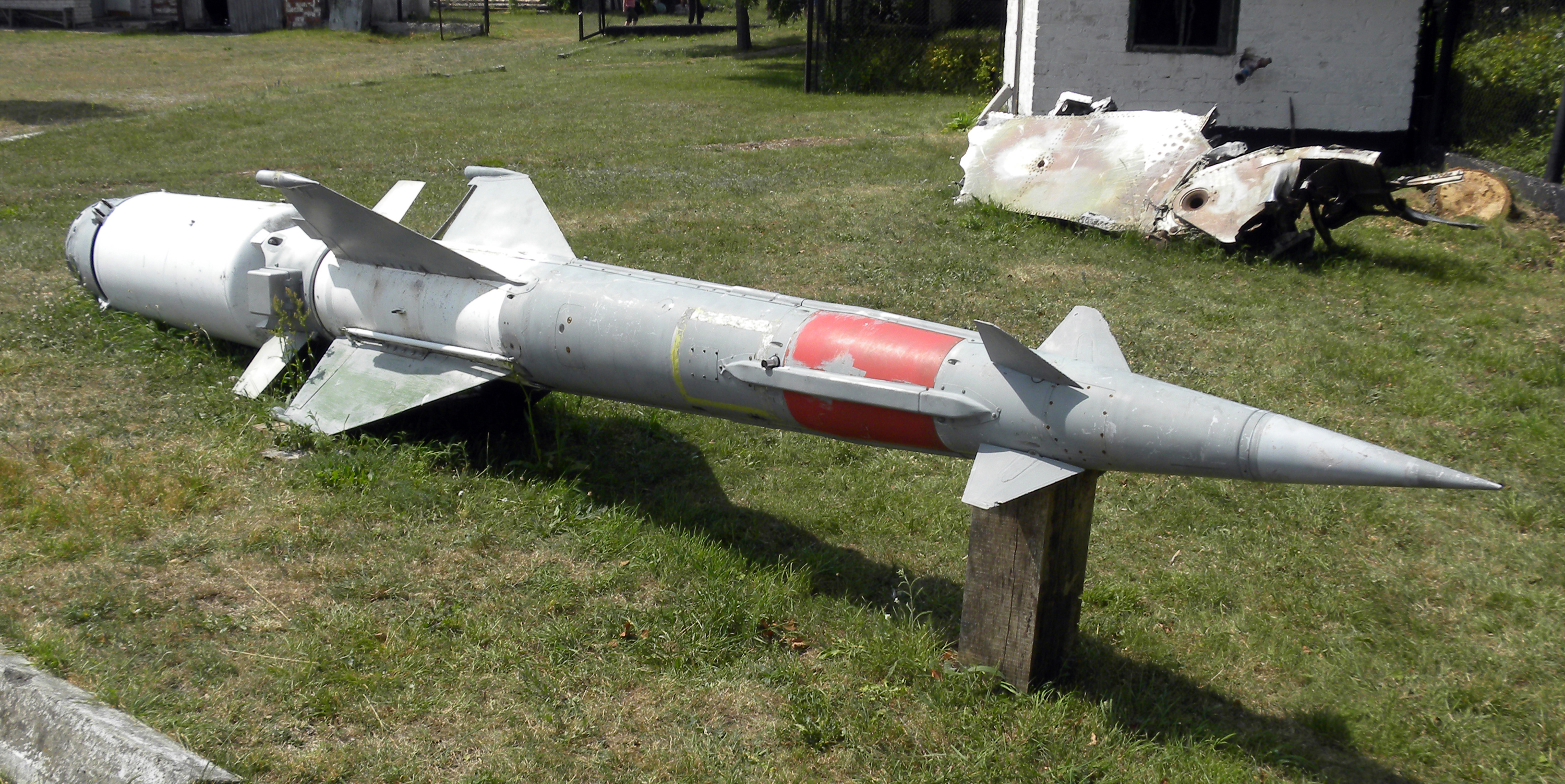
Abandoned Soviet S-125 missile near Saare, Saaremaa, Estonia.

The S-125 was first deployed between 1961 and 1964 around Moscow, augmenting the S-25 and S-75 sites already ringing the city, as well as in other parts of the USSR. In 1964, an upgraded version of the system, the S-125M "Neva-M" and later S-125M1 "Neva-M1" was developed. The original version was designated SA-3A by the US DoD and the new Neva-M named SA-3B and (naval) SA-N-1B. The Neva-M introduced a redesigned booster and an improved guidance system. The S-125 was not used against U.S. forces in Vietnam, because the Soviets feared that China (after the souring of Sino-Soviet relations in 1960), through which most, if not all of the equipment meant for North Vietnam had to travel, would try to copy the missile.

=== Angolan Civil War ===
The FAPA-DAA acquired a significant number of S-125s, and these were encountered during the first strike ever flown by SAAF Mirage F.1s against targets in Angola – in June 1980. While the SAAF reported two aircraft were damaged by SAMs during this action, Angola claimed to have shot down four.

On 7 June 1980, while attacking SWAPO's Tobias Haneko Training Camp during Operation Sceptic (Smokeshell), SAAF Major Frans Pretorius and Captain IC du Plessis, both flying Mirage F.1s, were hit by S-125s. Pretorius's aircraft was hit in a fuel line and he had to perform a deadstick landing at AFB Ondangwa. Du Plessis's aircraft sustained heavier damage and had to divert to Ruacana forward airstrip, where he landed with only the main undercarriage extended. Both aircraft were repaired and returned to service.

=== Middle East ===
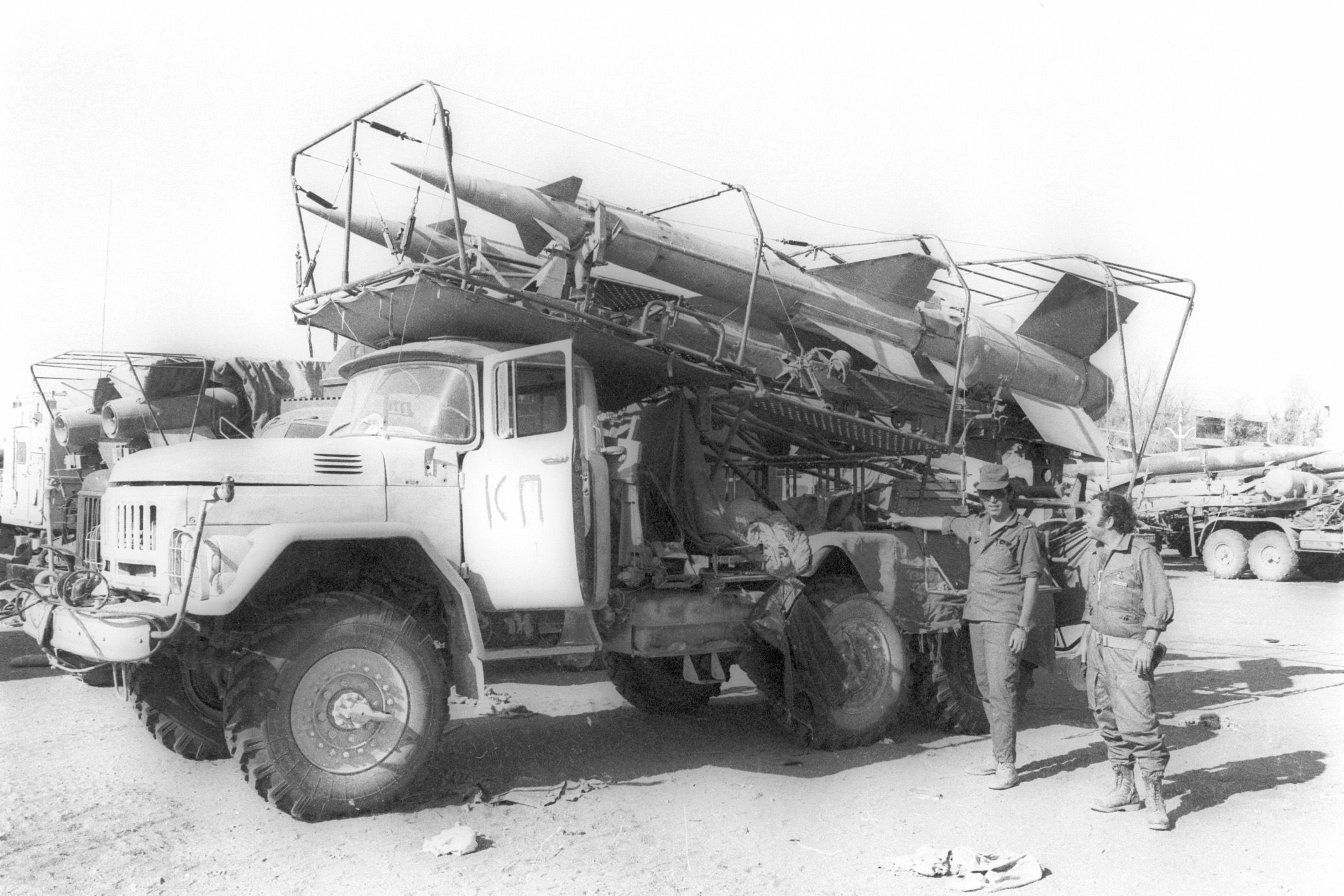
S-125 on Egyptian ZIL-131 transporter vehicle (9T911), captured by the IDF during the Yom Kippur War.

The Soviets supplied several S-125s to the Arab states in the late 1960s and 1970s, most notably Egypt and Syria. The S-125 saw extensive action during the War of Attrition and the Yom Kippur War. During the latter, the S-125, along with the S-75 Dvina and 2K12 Kub, formed the backbone of the Egyptian air defence network. In Egypt, March–July 1970 Soviet battalions of S-125 17 Shooting (35 missiles) shot down nine Israeli and one Egyptian planes. Israel recognized the 5 F-4 Phantoms in 1970 (1 more was W/O) and in 1973 another 6.

=== Persian Gulf War ===
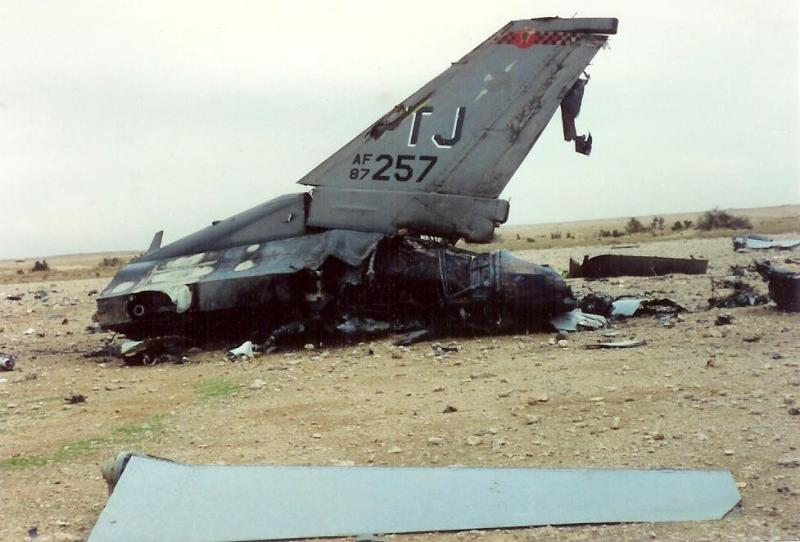
Remains of F-16C 87-257 as found by US ground forces in Iraq during Desert Storm. The canopy was recovered by US forces in the 2003 invasion.

During the Package Q Strike against downtown Baghdad on 19 January 1991, a USAF F-16 (serial 87-257) was shot down. The aircraft was struck by a S-125 just south of Baghdad. The pilot, Major Jeffrey Scott Tice, ejected safely but became a POW. It was the 8th combat loss and the first daylight raid over Baghdad.

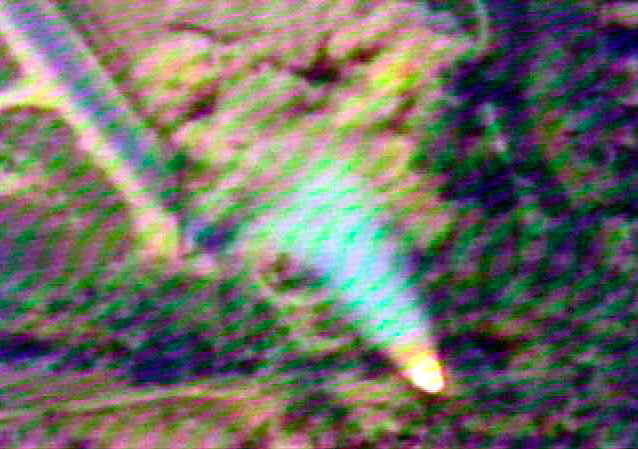
Still photograph from a videotape of an Iraqi surface-to-air missile, believed to be a S-125, launched at a coalition aircraft in July 2001.

=== Kosovo War ===
A Yugoslav Army 250th Air Defense Missile Brigade 3rd battery equipped with S-125 system shot down a F-117 Nighthawk stealth attack aircraft on March 27, 1999 during the Kosovo War (the only recorded downing of a stealth aircraft) near village Buđanovci, about 45 km from Belgrade. The pilot LT.COL. Darrell Patrick Zelko ejected and was later found by US search and rescue forces. An S-125 also shot down a NATO F-16 fighter on May 2 (its pilot; Lt. Col David L. Goldfein, the commander of 555th Fighter Squadron, managed to eject and was later rescued by a combat search-and-rescue (CSAR) mission).

=== Syrian Civil War ===
On 17 March 2015, a US MQ-1 Predator drone was shot down by a Syrian Air Defense Force S-125 missile while on an intelligence flight near the coastal town of Latakia.

In December 2016, ISIS forces captured three S-125 launchers after they retook Palmyra from Syrian government troops.

On April 14, 2018, American, British, and French forces launched a barrage of 103 air-to-surface and cruise missiles targeting eight Syrian military sites. The Russian military claimed that thirteen S-125 missiles launched in response destroyed five incoming missiles. However, the American Department of Defense stated no Allied missiles were shot down.

=== Second Nagorno-Karabakh War ===
According to a joint journalistic investigation by the Buro Media, Hetq and OCCRP, during the Second Nagorno-Karabakh War, Azerbaijan shot down Armenian drones with the Pechora-2TM air defense system, purchased from the private Belarusian arms manufacturer Tetraedr.

=== Russo-Ukrainian War ===
On 6 December 2022, a photo of Polish variant Newa-SC in Ukrainian service, likely made that summer, emerged in media during the Russian invasion of Ukraine. Until then, there had been no info on supplying Newa-SC to Ukraine.

=== India ===
During the 2025 India–Pakistan conflict, India used the S-125 missiles against Pakistani swarm drones and loitering munitions.

The missile systems have been integrated with the IACCS network. On 25 September 2020, Bengaluru-based Alpha Design Technologies Limited (ADTL) was awarded a ₹591.3 crore (equivalent to ₹759 crore or US$81 million in 2026) contract to manage an upgrade program for the system. The upgraded Pechora system includes the complete digitisation of the tracking radar system, new transmitter, upgrading receiver chain from valve/transistor components to semiconductor chips, modernization of operator cabin with digital displays, health monitoring systems, and the replacement of mechanical components, among others. ADTL also delivered software-defined radios, thermal imaging fire-control units, hand held laser target designators, and missile launch detection systems. User firing trials of the first upgraded system were conducted between 6 November and 6 December 2025 at the Pokhran Field Firing Ranges.

== Description ==
The S-125 is somewhat mobile, an improvement over the S-75 system. The missiles are typically deployed on fixed turrets containing two or four but can be carried ready-to-fire on ZIL trucks in pairs. Reloading the fixed launchers takes a few minutes.

=== Missile ===
V-600
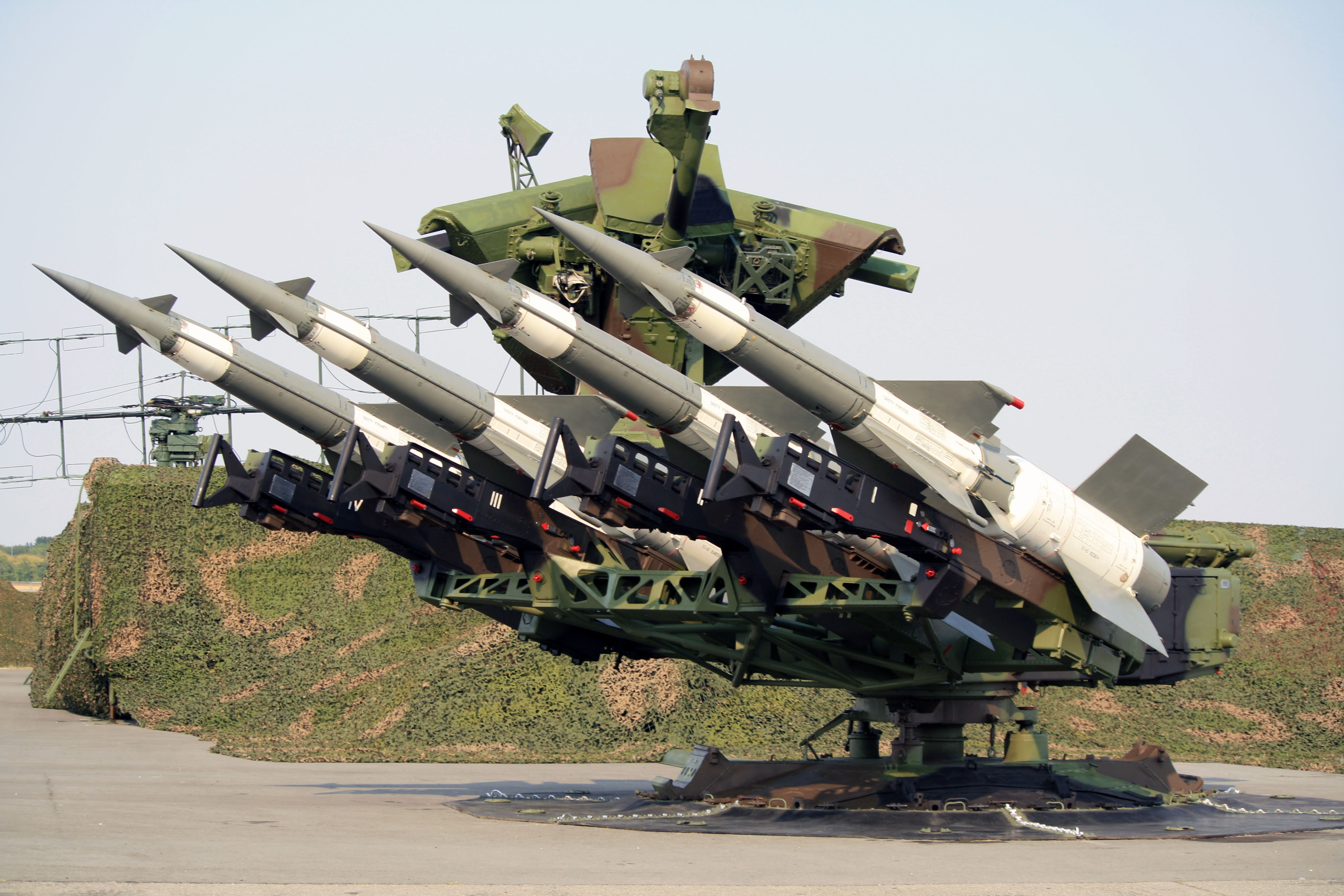
- V-600 missiles on the S-125 quadruple launcher.
- Type: Surface-to-air missile
- Place of origin: Soviet Union

Production history
- Variants: V-600, V-601

Specifications (V-601)
- Mass: 953 kg
- Length: 6,090 mm
- Diameter: 375 mm
- Wingspan: 2,200 mm
- Warhead: Frag-HE
- Warhead weight: 60 kg
- Detonation mechanism: Proximity fuse
- Propellant: Solid propellant rocket motor
- Operational range: 35 kilometres (22 mi)
- Flight altitude: 18,000 metres (59,000 ft)
- Guidance system: RF CLOS

The S-125 system uses two different missile versions and variants.

- V-600 (or 5V24) has the smallest warhead with 60 kg of high explosive. It has a range of about 15 km.
- V-601 (or 5V27): the upgraded S-125M (1970) system uses the 5V27 missile, with a length of 6.09 m, a wing span of 2,200 mm and a body diameter of 375 mm. This missile weighs 953 kg at launch, and has a 70 kg warhead containing 33 kg of HE and 4,500 fragments. The minimum range is 3.5 km, and the maximum is 35 km (with the Pechora 2A). The intercept altitudes are between 100 m and 18 km. Other sources claim the intercept altitudes between 20 m and 14 km. The minimum range is 2.5 km, and the maximum is 22 km
- 5V27D: the S-125M1 (1978) system uses the 5V27D missile. In the early 1980s, each system used one or two radar simulators to survive antiradar missiles.

=== Radars ===
The launchers are accompanied by a command building or truck and three primary radar systems:

- P-15 radar (NATO codename "Flat Face") or P-15M(2) (NATO codename "Squat Eye") 380 kW C-band target acquisition radar (also used by the 2K12 Kub and 9K33 Osa, range 250 km/155 miles)
- SNR-125 (NATO codename "Low Blow") 250 kW I/D-band tracking, fire control and guidance radar (range 40 km/25 miles, second mode 80 km/50 miles) Its parts: An UV-10, 3 cm wavelength, narrow beam transmitter/receiver antenna; 2 pcs of UV-11, 3 cm wavelength, wide beam receiver antenna for target tracking, an UV-12, decimeter wavelength, missile command transmitter antenna and a 9Sh33A camera (optical channel).

The P-15 is mounted on a van (P-15M(2) on a taller mast for better performance against low-altitude targets) and also an IFF (Identifies Friend or Foe), SNR-125 on a trailer and PRV-11 on a box-bodied trailer.

== Variants and upgrades ==
=== Naval version ===
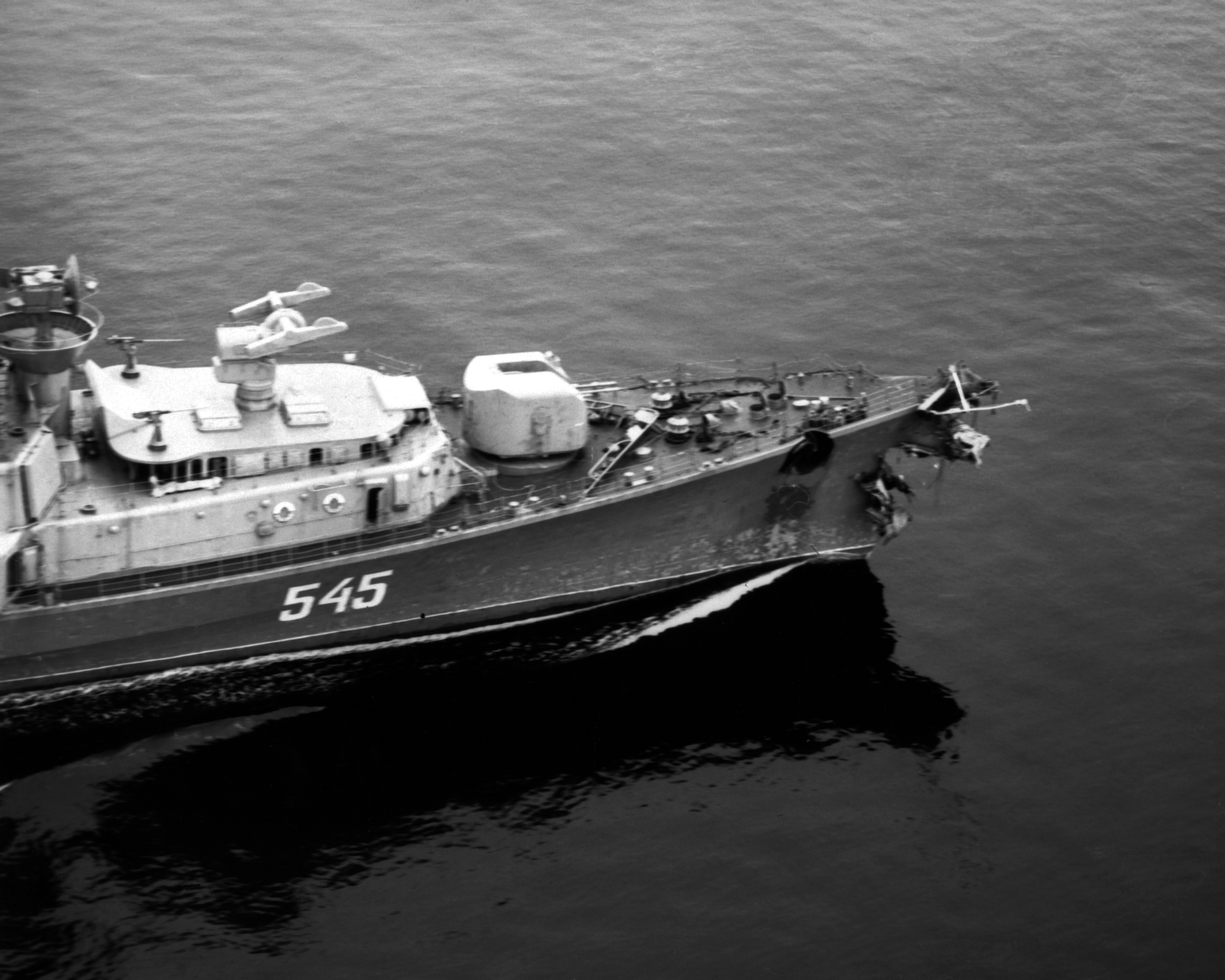
ZIF-101 launcher of Volna system on the Kashin-class destroyer Strogiy

Work on a naval version M-1 Volna (SA-N-1) started in 1956, along with work on a land version. It was first mounted on a rebuilt Kotlin-class destroyer (Project 56K) Bravyi and tested in 1962. In the same year, the system was accepted. The basic missile was a V-600 (or 4K90) (range: from 4 to 15 km, altitude: from 0.1 to 10 km). Fire control and guidance is carried out by 4R90 Yatagan radar, with five parabolic antennas on a common head. Only one target can be engaged at a time (or two, for ships fitted with two Volna systems). In case of emergency, Volna could be also used against naval targets, due to short response time.

The first launcher type was the two-missile ZIF-101, with a magazine for 16 missiles. In 1963 an improved two-missile launcher, ZIF-102, with a magazine for 32 missiles, was introduced to new ship classes. In 1967 Volna systems were upgraded to Volna-M (SA-N-1B) with V-601 (4K91) missiles (range: 4–22 km, altitude: 0.1–14 km).

In 1974 - 1976 some systems were modernized to Volna-P standard, with an additional TV target tracking channel and better resistance to jamming. Later, improved V-601M missiles were introduced, with lower minimal attack altitude against aerial targets (system Volna-N).

The Rajput-class destroyers, which were modified Kashin-class destroyers built for India, also carried the M-1 Volna system. By early 2025, the three ships of the class still in service had the system replaced by other weapons or removed, ending the system's service in the Indian Navy.

=== Modern upgrades ===
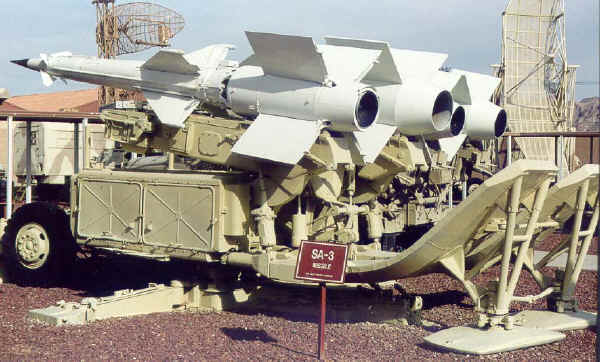
Two S-125 dual missile launcher trailers.

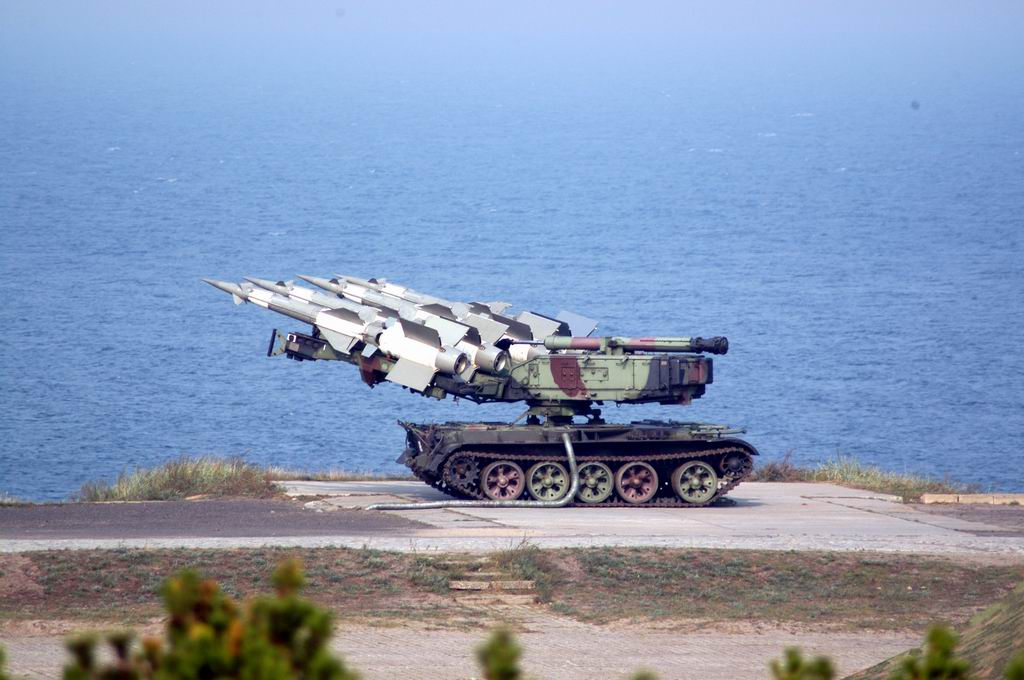
Newa SC.

Since Russia replaced all of its S-125 sites with S-300 systems, they decided to upgrade the S-125 systems being removed from service to make them more attractive to export customers.

- Released in 2000, the Pechora-2 version features better range, multiple target engagement ability and a higher probability of kill (PK). The launcher is moved onto a truck allowing much shorter relocation times.
- It is also possible to fire the Pechora-2M system against cruise missiles. Deployment time 25 minutes, protected from the active interference, and anti-radiation missiles (total in practical shooting)

Early warning radar is replaced by anti-stealth radar Kasta 2E2, target distance at 2.5–32 km, target altitude - 0.02–20 km, missile launchers can be positioned at up to 10 kilometers away from the control center. Speed up to 1000 m/s (target), Used rocket 5V27DE, by weight the warhead + 50% range of flight splinters + 350%. Probability of hitting the target 1st rocket: at a distance up to 25 km - 0,72-0,99, detection range with the radar cross section = 2 sq meters about 100 km, with RCS = 0.15 sq m - about 50 km, with no interference. When using active jamming - 40 km. ADMS "Pechora-2M" has the ability to interfacing with higher level command post and radar remote using telecode channels. Is equally effective at any time during the day and at night (optical location, daytime and nighttime, and also thermal imager) was awarded a contract to overhaul Egypt's S-125 SAM system. These refurbished weapons have been reintroduced as the S-125 Pechora 2M.

In 2001, Poland began offering an upgrade to the S-125 known as the Newa SC. This replaced many analogue components with digital ones for improved reliability and accuracy. This upgrade also involves mounting the missile launcher on a WZT-1 tank chassis (a TEL), greatly improving mobility and also adds IFF capability and data links. Radar is mounted on an 8-wheeled heavy truck chassis (formerly used for Scud launchers). Serbian modifications include terminal/camera homing from radar base.

Cuba also developed a similar upgrade to the Polish one, which was displayed in La Habana in 2006.

Later the same year, the Russian version was upgraded again to the Pechora-M which upgraded almost all aspects of the system - the rocket motor, radar, guidance, warhead, fuse and electronics. There is an added laser/infra-red tracking device to allow launching of missiles without the use of the radar.

There is also a version of the S-125 available from Russia with the warhead replaced with telemetry instrumentation, for use as target drones.

In October 2010, Ukrainian Aerotechnica announced a modernized version of S-125 named S-125-2D Pechora. As of 2018 according to the UkrOboronProm, the S-125 surface-to-air missile underwent an integrated modification of all elements, including modernization of missiles, as well as the use of a new radar station built on solid-state elements. The distance of the Ukrainian S-125 modernization's engagement area, 40 km, is greater than that of the Russian one.

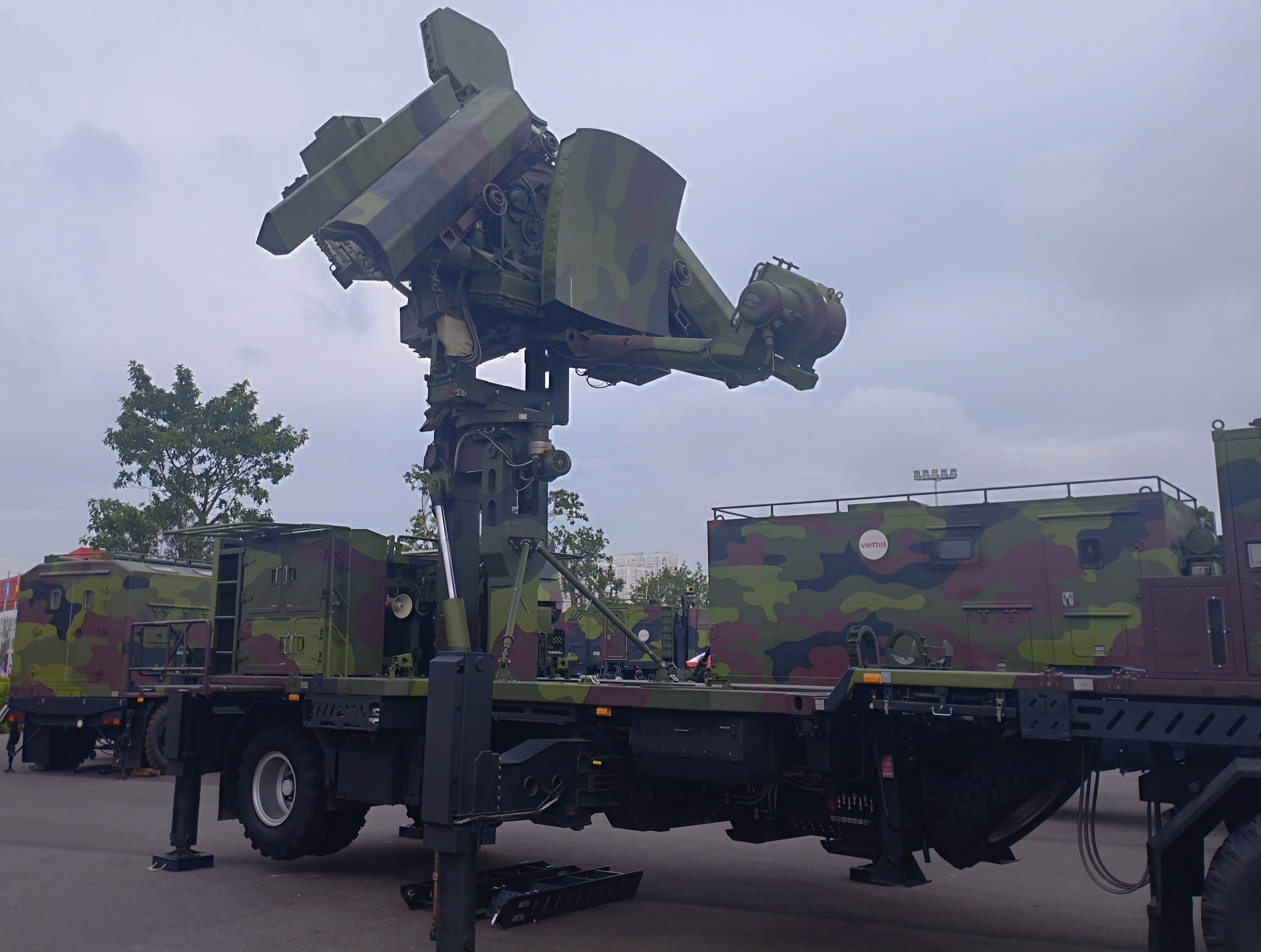
An UNV-VT radar station of Vietnam's S-125-VT system, being a modernization developed by Viettel.

The Vietnamese state-owned agency Viettel Aerospace Institute has unveiled a modernization version of S-125, designated as the S-125-VT. More than 5 systems has been upgraded and being in service of Vietnamese Air Defence since 2024. The upgrade package includes compatibility with a newer, more modern surveillance radar, enhanced anti-jamming capability, and mechanization of components such as the SNR-125 fire-control radar and the missile reloading vehicle. A new missile model was also developed and upgraded, designated TLDK-35.

== Operators ==
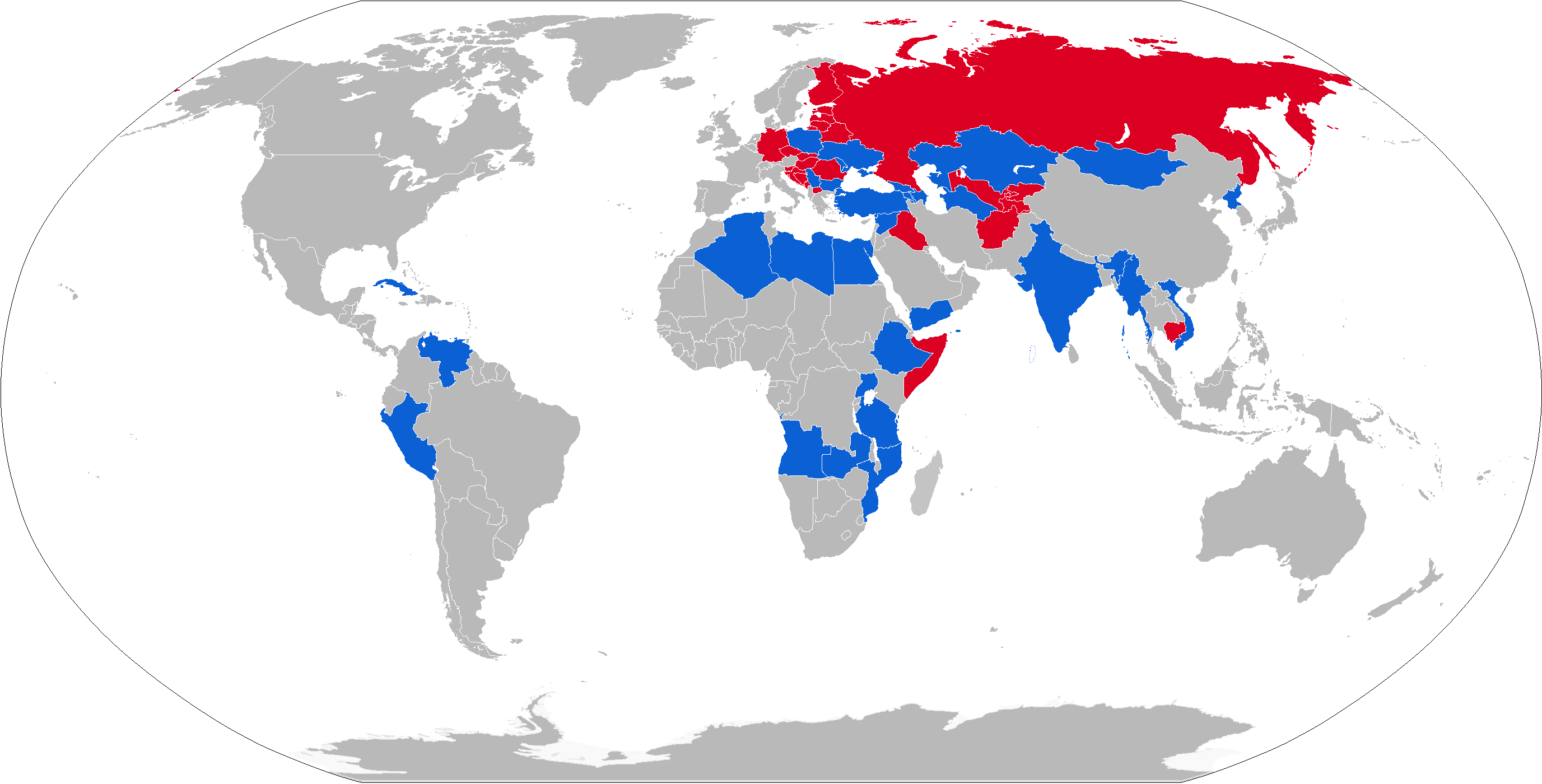
Operators Current Former

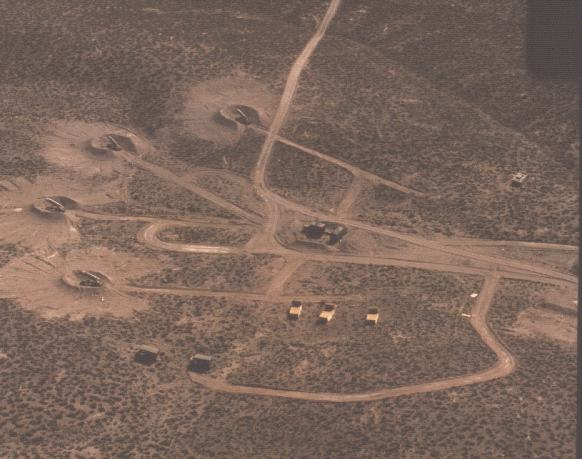
Simulated Soviet surface to air missile site at Nellis AFB.

=== Current ===
- Algeria − 12 S-125M Pechora-M and 24 S-125M1 Pechora-M1 batteries as of 2024.
- Angola − 12 S-125M1 Pechora-M1 batteries as of 2024.
- Armenia
- Azerbaijan − 24 S-125-2TM Pechora-2TM batteries as of 2024.
- Bulgaria − S-125M Neva-M.
- Cuba − S-125M/M1 Pechora M/M1, some Pechora M1s are mounted on T-55 tank chassis.
- Egypt − 40 S-125-2M Pechora-2M and 120 S-125M Pechora-M batteries as of 2024.
- Ethiopia − 4 S-125M1 Pechora-M1 batteries as of 2024.
- India − S-125M Pechora-M.
- Kazakhstan − 3 S-125-1T batteries as of 2024.
- Kyrgyzstan − 8 S-125M1 Neva-M1 batteries as of 2024.
- Laos − 6 S-125M Pechora-M batteries as of 2024. Serviceability doubtful
- Moldova − 3 S-125M1 Neva-M1 batteries as of 2024.
- Mongolia − 2+ S-125-2M Pechora-2M batteries as of 2024.
- Myanmar − S-125-2M Pechora-2M.
- North Korea− 20 S-125M1 Pechora-M1 batteries as of 2024. Serviceability doubtful.
- Peru
- Poland − 14 S-125 Newa SC batteries as of 2024.
- Serbia − 6 S-125M Neva-M batteries as of 2024.
- Syria − S-125-2M Pechora-2M and S-125M/M1 Pechora-M/M1.
- South Sudan − 16 S-125 Pechora batteries as of 2024. Serviceability doubtful.
- Tajikistan − 3 S-125 Pechora-2M and 5 S-125M1 Neva-M1 batteries as of 2024.
- Turkmenistan − 4 S-125 Pechora-2M, 12 S-125M1 Neva-M1, and some S-125-2BM Pechora batteries as of 2024.
- Ukraine − In 2022, Ukraine received an undisclosed number of S-125 Newa SC systems from Poland.
- Uzbekistan − 4 S-125-2M Pechora-2M and 10 S-125M1 Neva-M1 batteries as of 2024.
- Venezuela − 44 S-125 Pechora-2M batteries as of 2024.
- Vietnam − 30 S-125TM Pechora-2TM and 21 S-125M Pechora-M batteries as of 2024. The S-125-VT modernized variant was reported to be in service in July 2024
- Zambia − 6 S-125M Pechora-M batteries as of 2024.

=== Former ===
- Afghanistan − 12 launchers in 1992.
- Belarus
- Cambodia
- Czechoslovakia − 120 launchers in 1992, passed on to successor states.
- Czech Republic
- East Germany
- Finland − 12 launchers in 1992, designated as the ItO-79.
- Georgia
- Hungary − 24 launchers in 1992.
- Iraq
- Islamic State − 2 batteries captured from the Syrian Army in 2016, non-operational
- Libya − 132 launchers prior to the 2011 Libyan Civil War.
- Mali − 12 launchers in 1992, in 2014, Mali's remaining stockpile of V-601 missiles was disposed of.
- Mozambique − 12 launchers in 2002
- North Yemen
- Russia − 100 launchers in 2002.
- Serbia and Montenegro − 16 launchers in 2002, passed on to Serbia
- Slovakia
- Somalia − 8 launchers in 1991.
- South Yemen
- Soviet Union − 1,250 launchers in 1991, passed on to successor states.
- Tanzania
- Tigray Defense Forces
- Yemen − 12 launchers in 2002, most were upgraded to the Pechora-2M standard
- Yugoslavia − 140 launchers in 1992.

== Gallery of radars ==
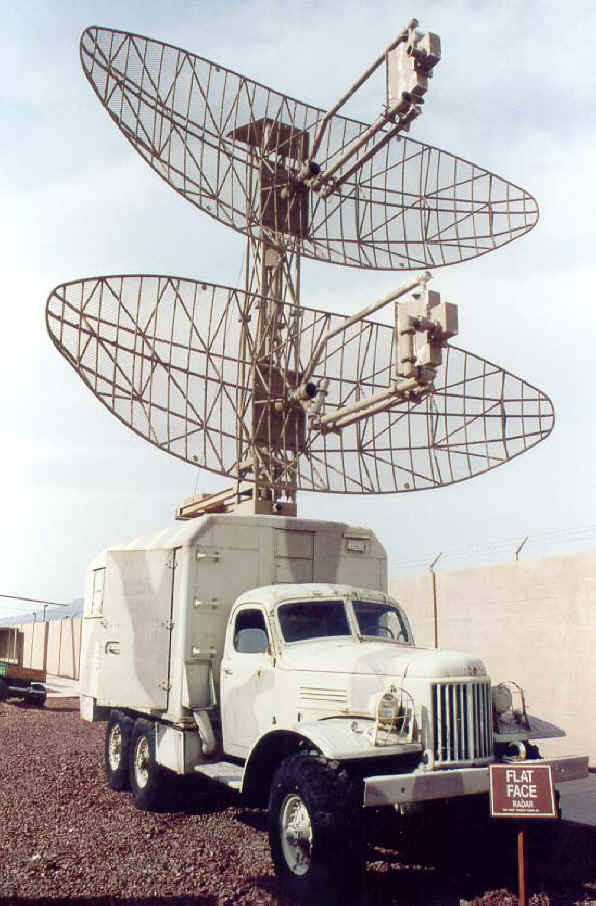
P-15 "Flat Face" radar.

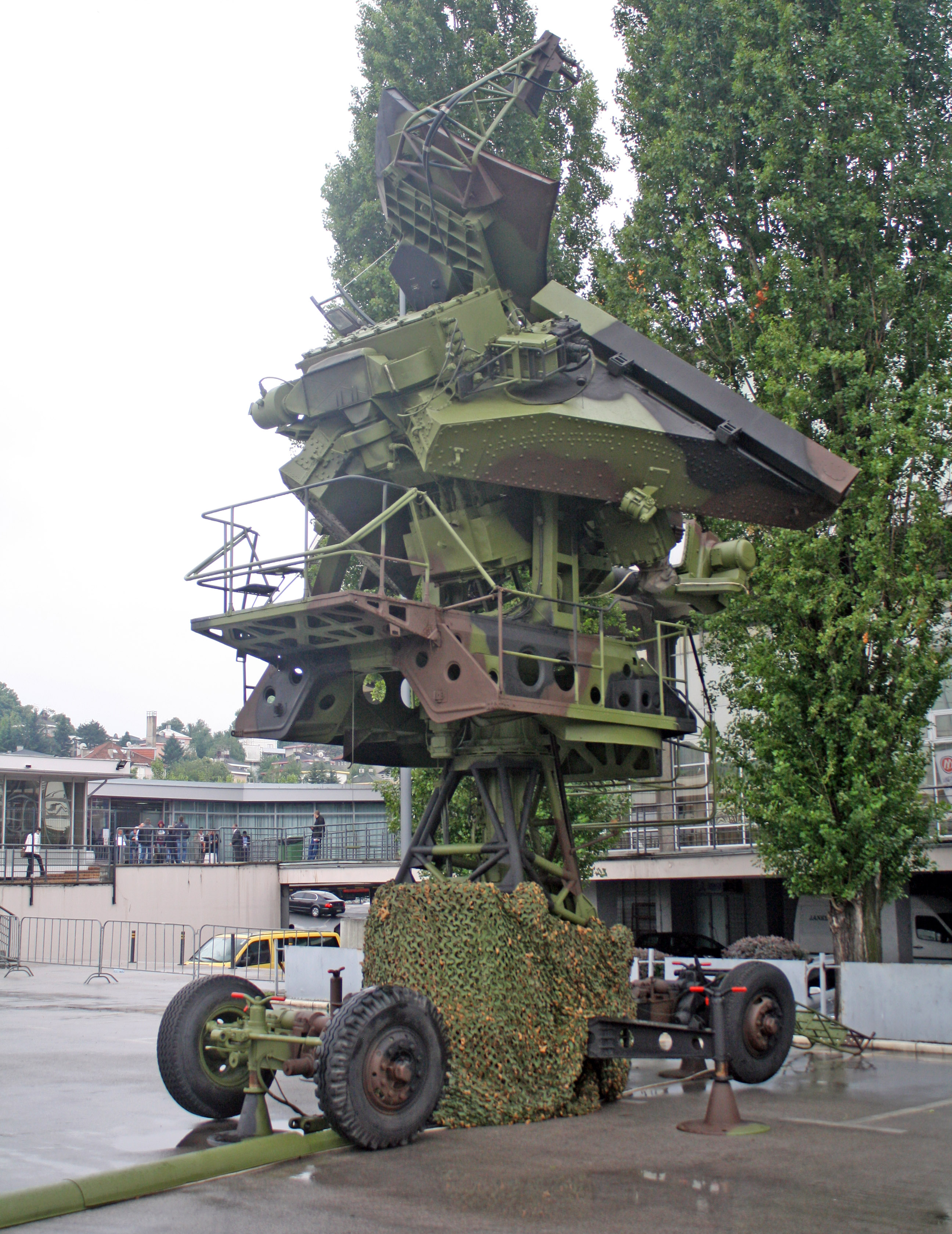
SNR-125 "Low Blow" radar.

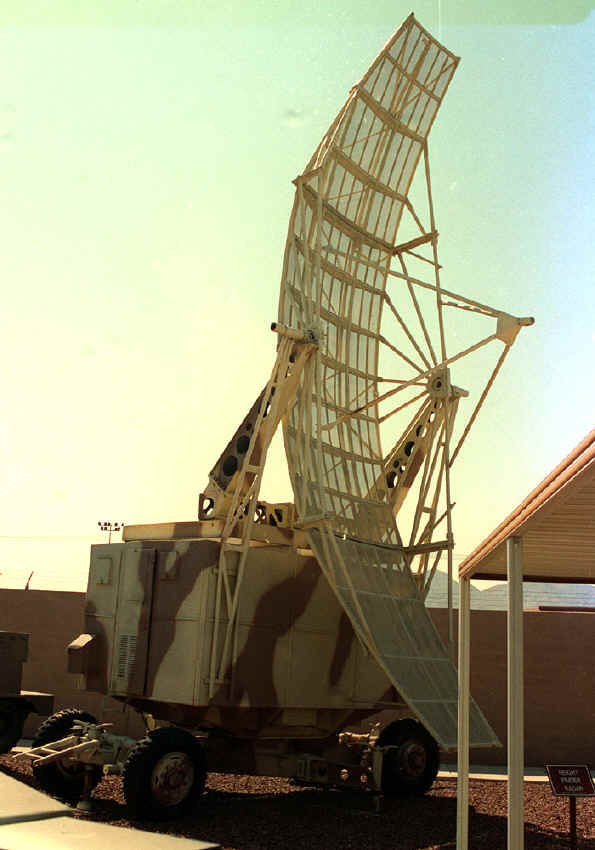
PRV-11 "Side Net" radar.
