= Mitrofan Moskalenko =

Soviet naval officer

Mitrofan Ivanovich Moskalenko
- Born: 5 August 1896; Sloboda Lushnikovka, Ostrogozhsky Uyezd, Voronezh Governorate, Russian Empire
- Died: 4 November 1966 (aged 70); Moscow, Soviet Union
- Burial place: Novodevichy Cemetery
- Military career
- Allegiance: USSR
- Branch: Soviet Navy
- Service years: 1918-1956
- Rank: Colonel General
- Conflicts: Russian Civil War; Winter War; Second World War
- Awards: Order of Lenin; Order of the Red Banner (three times); Order of Nakhimov First Class; Order of the Patriotic War First Class; Order of the Red Star

Mitrofan Ivanovich Moskalenko (Russian: Митрофан Иванович Москаленко; 5 August 1896 – 4 November 1966) was an officer of the Soviet Navy. He worked in the navy's coastal defence branch and reached the rank of Colonel General.

Born in 1896, Moskalenko was called up for service in the Imperial Russian Army in 1915. With the outbreak of the Russian Civil War, he sided with the Red forces and after taking special command courses, served in various roles with supply and engineering units. This connection with the logistics of war would define his later career. He served on the Southern Front during the 1920s, forging a connection with the navy which would also become significant. By 1928 he was military commissar of the Dnieper Flotilla, and later assistant commander and head of the political department of the Amur Flotilla. He made a foray into education after studying at the Naval Academy, becoming acting head of the Dzerzhinsky Naval Engineering School, and then First Deputy Chief of the Naval Academy.

After a brief spell in the reserve, Moskalenko became head of the Baltic Fleet's logistics department. He served in this role during the Winter War, and after the Axis invasion of the Soviet Union in June 1941. Among his significant responsibilities in the early stages of the war was the defence of the Hanko Naval Base and the Soviet evacuation of Tallinn. During the siege of Leningrad, Moskalenko was one of those who developed plans to deliver food to the city in December 1941, the first winter of the siege. A colonel general of the coastal service by the end of the war, he continued to serve in naval logistics, being appointed Chief of the Soviet Navy's Logistics Department in 1947, and serving as such through various title changes until his retirement in 1956. He died in 1966 at the age of 70, having received a number of honours and awards. Two ships of the Soviet and Russian Navies have been named after him.

== Career ==
=== Early life and Russian Civil War ===
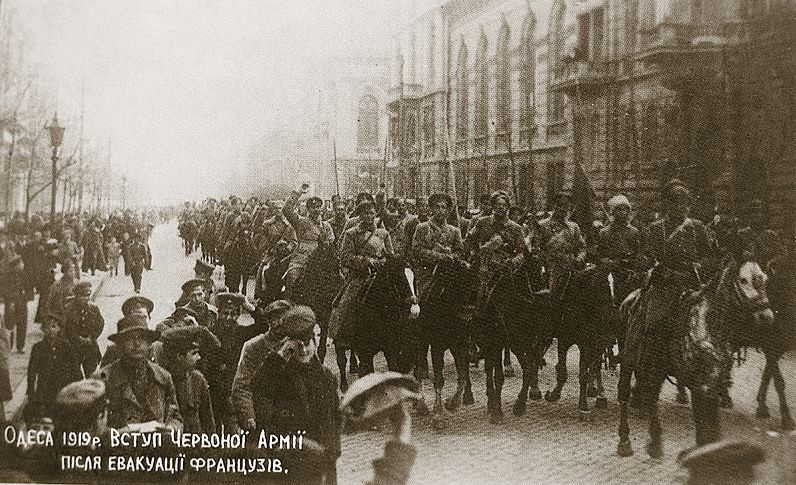
Red Army forces in Odesa during the civil war. Moskalenko was employed in the region at this time, working on military engineering tasks.

Moskalenko was born on 5 August 1896 in Sloboda Lushnikovka, Ostrogozhsky Uyezd, in what was then Voronezh Governorate in the Russian Empire. He was first drafted into the Imperial Russian Army in 1915, serving as a private, and then a non-commissioned officer of a training platoon of a signalling battalion, and then as a senior non-commissioned officer. He entered the Red Army in September 1918, during the Russian Civil War, and took special command courses in Oryol from September to November 1918. He spent the next two years until September 1920 as an instructor of an engineering company, and a clerk in the Orel Military District, joining the Bolshevik Party in 1919. Oryol was briefly captured by the forces of White General Anton Denikin on 13 October 1919, but a counteroffensive retook the city on 20 October 1919. Moskalenko saw action on the Southern Front from September 1920, working in various military units tasked with engineering and construction details. He was secretary of the party organization for military field construction to strengthen the Odesa and Ochakov coastal defence districts, military commissar of an engineering battalion, and then military commissar of the 1st department of military field construction, assistant military commissar of the Odesa and Kyiv engineering sectors. In August 1923 Moskalenko was appointed military commissar of the Volyn engineering sector, and then from February 1924, military commissar of the Odesa and Ochakov coastal defence districts. In October 1926 he became military commissar of the North-West coastal defence districts.

=== Interwar years ===
In 1928, Moskalenko was appointed military commissar of the Dnieper Flotilla, before being sent for training at the Advanced Training Courses for Senior Command Staff in April 1930. He graduated in March 1931, and was appointed assistant commander and head of the political department of the Amur Flotilla. He enrolled in the Voroshilov Naval Academy in 1932, graduating in 1935, and in May 1937 was appointed chief of staff of the Dzerzhinsky Naval Engineering School. He became acting head of the school in December 1937, and from June 1938, First Deputy Chief of the Voroshilov Naval Academy.

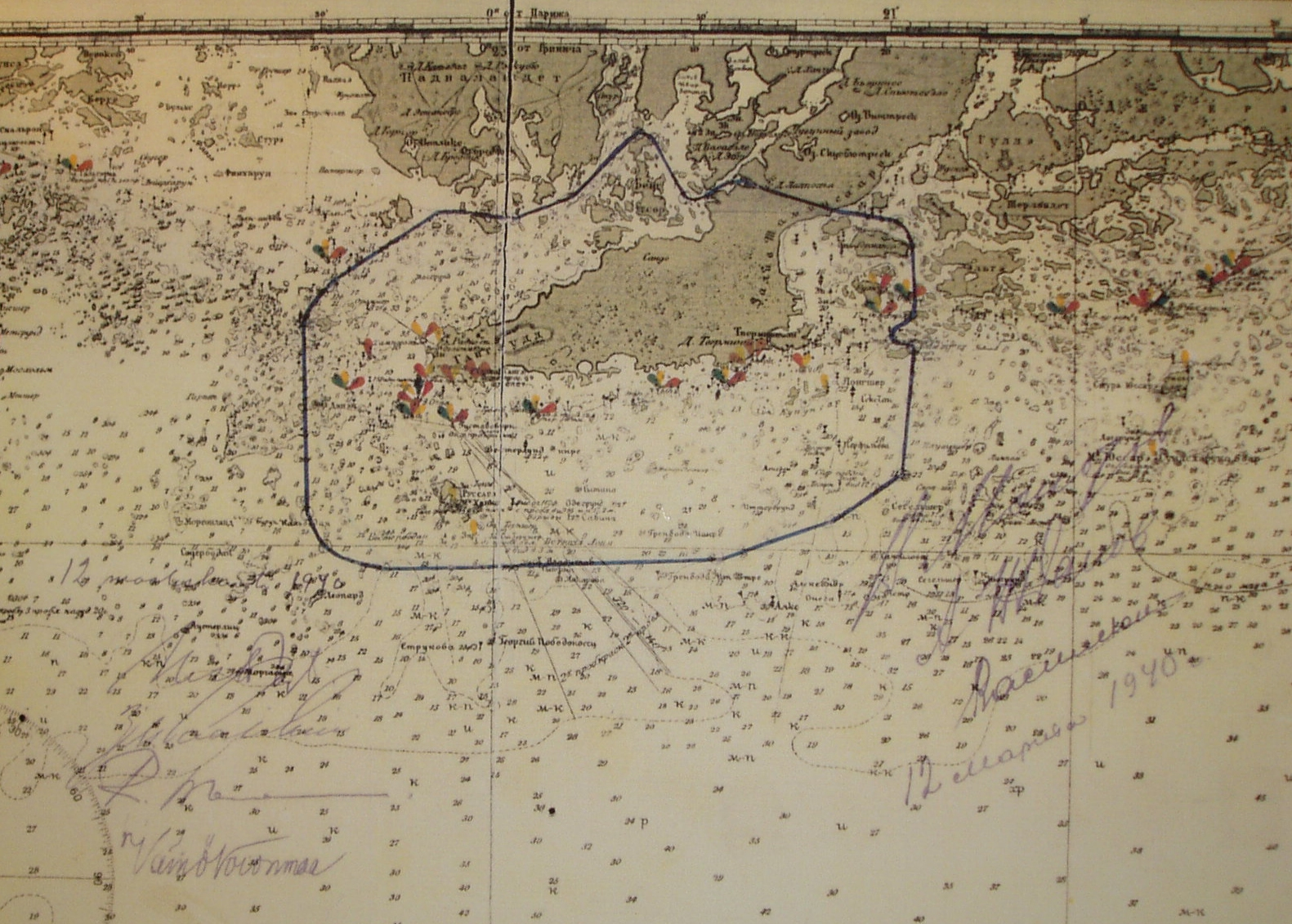
Map showing the location of the Hanko Naval Base. Moskalenko was with the first officials arriving to establish the base following its lease to the Soviet Union.

Moskalenko was transferred to the reserve in January 1939, but returned to active service in June that year with an appointment to command of the Baltic Fleet's Main Military Port and from October 1939, the fleet's Logistics Directorate. By then he was a captain 2nd rank, but was promoted to captain 1st rank on 28 January 1940 during the Winter War with Finland which ended in March 1940 with the signing of the Moscow Peace Treaty. Under the terms of the treaty, the Soviet Union was granted a lease on the town of Hanko, where it established the Hanko Naval Base. On accepting the terms of the treaty, Moskalenko in his role as Chief of the Baltic Fleet's Logistics flew there in March together with the newly appointed head of the base, Captain 1st Rank Sergei Belousov, and other Soviet officials. Moskalenko was promoted to Brigade Commander on 15 April 1940, and then to Major General of the Coastal Service on 4 June 1940.

=== Second World War ===
With the Axis invasion of the Soviet Union in June 1941, the Baltic theatre became heavily contested between German, Finnish and Soviet forces. Moskalenko travelled from Tallinn to Hanko with the commander of the Baltic Fleet, Vice-Admiral Vladimir Tributs on 10 July 1941 to examine the state of defences and to order the troops to hold out and make the enemy forces strengthen their attacks on the base, in order to relieve pressure on Leningrad. By August, German forces had continued to advance and the navy began operations to evacuate ships, equipment and personnel from Tallinn. Moskalenko oversaw the evacuation of large quantities of technical equipment, which later became important in maintaining and repairing the fleet during the years Leningrad was under siege and cut off from resupply. Now based in Leningrad, Moskalenko was one of those who developed plans to deliver food to the city in December 1941, the first winter of the siege. One of the decisions he made was to hand out the fleet's emergency supplies to the starving populace in the hopes that it would be enough for them to hold out until the ice on Lake Ladoga was sufficiently thick enough to establish the Road of Life supply system. He was promoted to lieutenant general of the coastal service on 3 January 1942, and colonel general of the coastal service on 8 July 1945.

=== Postwar ===
Moskalenko continued to serve with the Baltic Fleet after the war, and on its division into two parts in February 1946, he was the Northern Baltic Fleet's, in 1947 renamed the 8th Fleet's, chief of logistics. In March 1947, he was appointed Chief of the Soviet Navy's Logistics Department, and in August 1949, Deputy Commander-in-Chief of the Soviey Navy for Logistics, and Chief of Logistics of the Soviet Navy. In March 1950 his title became Deputy Commander-in-Chief for Logistics, with his rank becoming Colonel General on 5 May 1952. His final change of title came in April 1953, when he became Chief of Logistics of the Navy, until his retirement in January 1956, at the age of 59.

Moskalenko died in Moscow on 4 November 1966 at the age of 70. He was buried in the city's Novodevichy Cemetery. His wife, Tatyana Vlasovna Moskalenko (1904–1983), was buried next to him. The monument on their grave was sculpted by Grigory Postnikov.

== Awards and honours ==
Over his career Moskalenko was awarded the Order of Lenin on 21 February 1945, three Orders of the Red Banner in 1943, on 3 November 1944, and in 1949, the Order of the Red Star in 1940, the Orders of Nakhimov, and the Patriotic War First Classes on 24 May 1945 and 22 February 1944 respectively, and various medals.

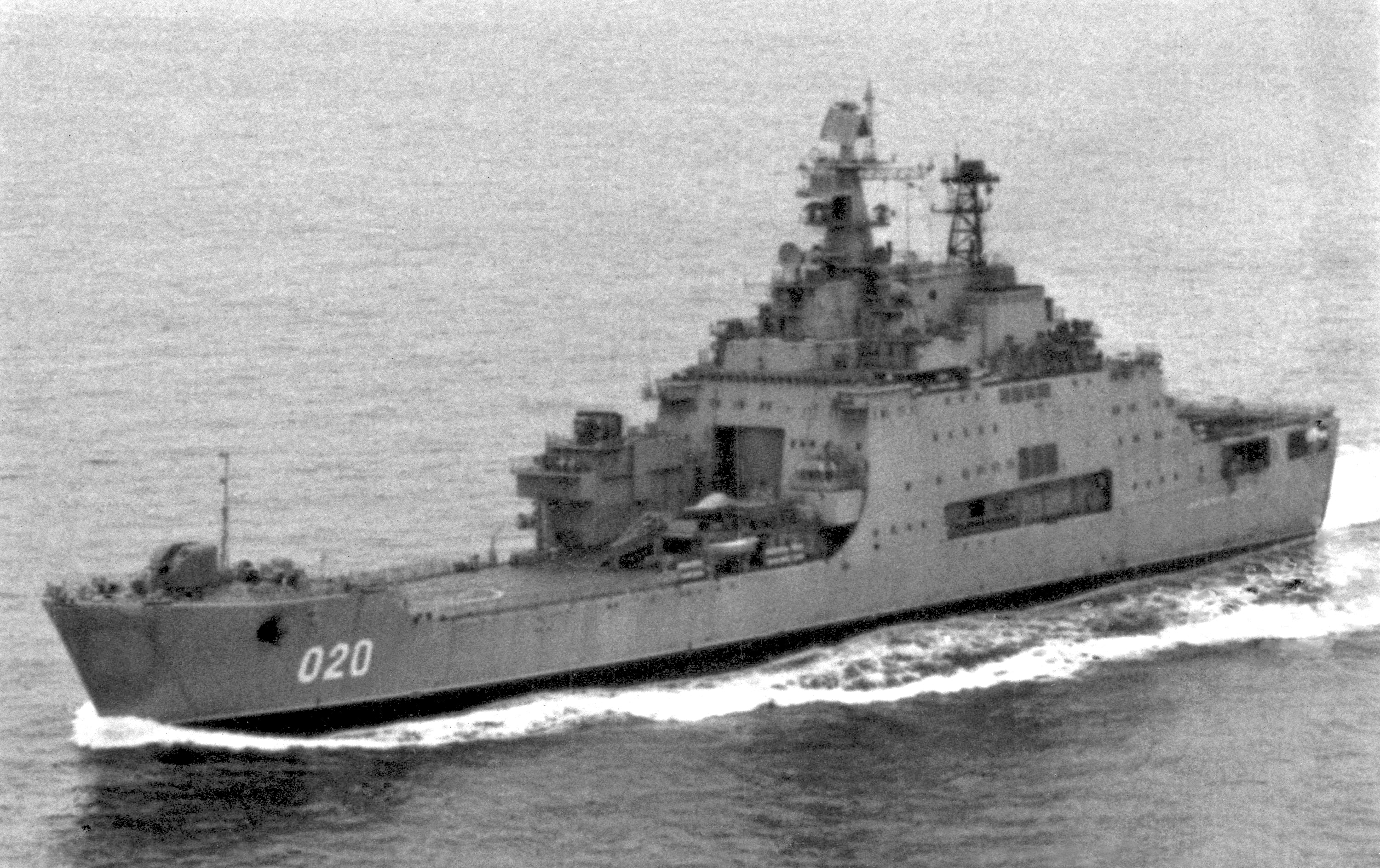
The landing ship Mitrofan Moskalenko underway in 1994

Two ships of the Soviet and Russian Navies have been named for Moskalenko. The first was the Ivan Rogov-class landing ship Mitrofan Moskalenko, built for the Soviet Navy and launched in 1988. She served with the Russian Navy until her decommissioning in 2006. On 20 July 2020, a new Mitrofan Moskalenko, one of the Project 23900 amphibious assault ships, was laid down at the Zaliv Shipbuilding Yard in Kerch, on the Black Sea.
