= Ivan Rogov =

Soviet naval officer

Ivan Vasilyevich Rogov
- Born: 10 August 1899; Kazan, Russian Empire
- Died: 5 December 1949 (aged 50) Riga, Soviet Union
- Buried: Novodevichy Cemetery
- Allegiance: Soviet Union
- Branch: Soviet Navy
- Service years: 1919-1949
- Rank: Colonel General
- Conflicts: Russian Civil War; Winter War; Second World War
- Awards: Order of Lenin; Order of the Red Banner (four times); Order of Ushakov First Class; Order of Nakhimov First Class; Order of the Red Star; Order of the Cross of Grunwald Second Class

Ivan Vasilyevich Rogov (Russian: Иван Васильевич Рогов; 10 August 1899 – 5 December 1949) was an officer of the Soviet Navy. He worked in the navy's coastal defence branch and reached the rank of Colonel General.

Born in 1899, Rogov was an early recruit to the Soviet ranks, joining the Communist Party in 1918, and the Red Army in 1919. He saw action during the Russian Civil War, and soon became involved in military political work serving as the political instructor for various units. He remained in the armed forces after the civil war, serving as a military commissar in various military districts. He rose through the ranks, becoming a member of the Military Council of the Byelorussian Military District between 1938 and 1939. During this period he was involved in the organization of the mass army purges between 1936 and 1941 as part of the wider Great Purge. In 1939, he became member of the Central Committee of the Communist Party, and also that month was appointed Chief of the Political Directorate of the Navy, and Deputy People's Commissar of the Navy. He participated in the Winter War with Finland between 1939 and 1940, and then the Second World War.

Rogov was Deputy People's Commissar of the Navy throughout the war, and from December 1943 until February 1944, concurrently a member of the Military Council of the Black Sea Fleet. He remained in naval and political work after the war, becoming a deputy of the Supreme Soviet of the Soviet Union in 1946, and a member of the Military Council of the Baltic Military District from August 1946. He died suddenly on 5 December 1949 at the age of 50. Assessments of his service vary, but he received a number of honours and awards of his career, and several ships of the Soviet and Russian navies have been named after him.

== Career ==
=== Early life and Russian Civil War ===
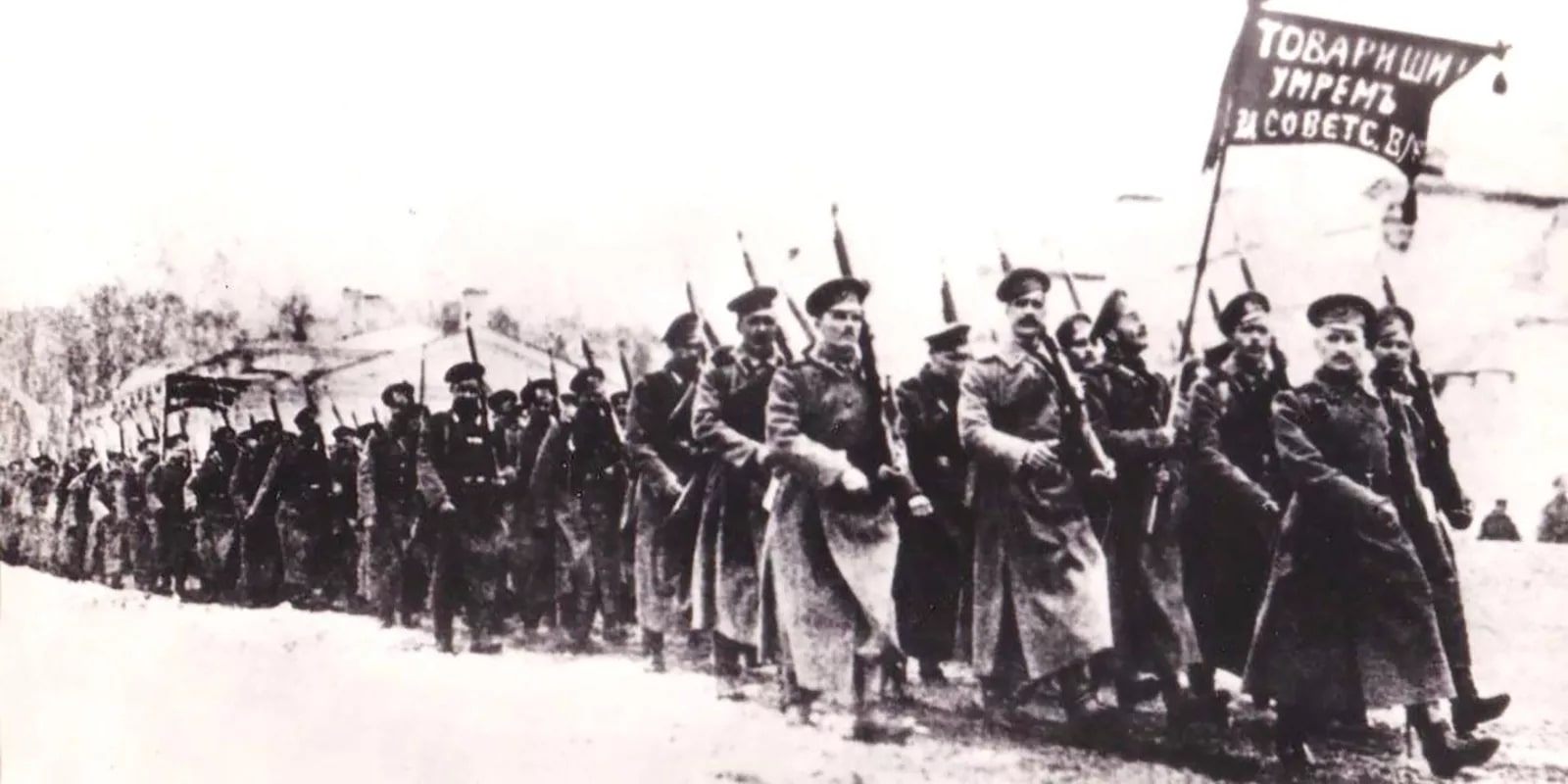
Red Army soldiers during the Russian Civil War

Rogov was born on 10 August 1899 in Kazan, in the Russian Empire, into the family of handicrafts workers. He graduated from the Kazan Provincial School of Social Sciences and joined the Russian Communist Party (Bolsheviks) in 1918, and the Red Army in 1919. He saw action during the Russian Civil War, fighting on the Southwestern and Eastern Fronts, and was wounded in September 1920 during the Polish–Soviet War. He went on to serve as the political instructor of a company, and then a battery between April 1919 and April 1920, before becoming military commissar of the 12th Army's medical unit until December 1920. He served as military commissar of the 92nd and 91st hospitals in Kazan in 1920, and aboard a hospital train. His final work during the Russian Civil War as an instructor of the political department of the Reserve Army, and the political department of a division in the Volga Military District from December 1920 to November 1922.

=== Interwar years ===
After the war Rogov continued to work in the party political branch of the armed forces with the Volga Military District, as military commissar of a battalion, and then the 136th regiment of the 16th Rifle Division from November 1922 to June 1923. He was military commissar of a guard company from June to December 1923, political officer of the chief of the main artillery depot from December 1923 to November 1924, military commissar of the 6th Separate Pontoon Battalion from November 1924 to April 1926, and then in the Leningrad Military District's 1st Railway Regiment from April 1926 to November 1927. From then until March 1931, Rogov was military commissar of the 6th Topographic Detachment. Between March 1931 and March 1933, Rogov was the military commissar of the Moscow Military District's 3rd Geodetic Detachment and then commander of the Leningrad Military District's 3rd Topographic Detachment until March 1936. He was then military commissar of the Kharkov Military District's 2nd Directorate of Topographic Works in Kremenchug from March 1936.

In December 1937, Rogov was appointed military commissar of the 23rd Rifle Division, and from April 1938, was on the General Staff. He was promoted to brigade commissar on 19 April, and then division commissar on 5 September 1938. In September 1938, he became a member of the Military Council of the Byelorussian Military District, a post he held until March 1939. During this period he was involved in the organization of the mass army purges between 1936 and 1941 as part of the wider Great Purge. He was again promoted, on 9 February 1939, to the rank of corps commissar. In March 1939, he became member of the Central Committee of the Communist Party, a role he would hold until his death, and also that month was appointed Chief of the Political Directorate of the Navy, and Deputy People's Commissar of the Navy. He was promoted to the rank of army commissar 2nd rank on 1 April 1939. He also participated in the Winter War with Finland between 1939 and 1940.

=== Second World War and later life ===
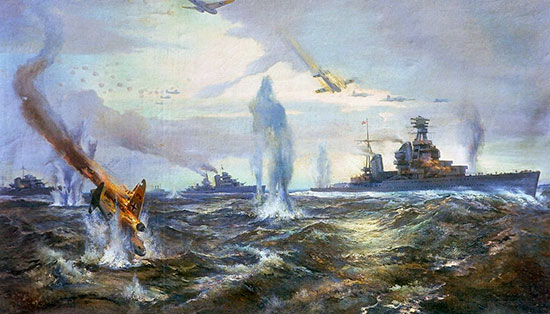
The Soviet evacuation of Tallinn in 1941. Rogov warned naval commanders in the Black Sea against repeating many of the mistakes of this operation.

Rogov served in this role throughout the period of the Soviet part in the Second World War, being promoted to Lieutenant General of the Coastal Service on 13 December 1942. From December 1943 until February 1944, he was concurrently a member of the Military Council of the Black Sea Fleet. He was promoted to Colonel General of the Coastal Service on 25 September 1944. His experience in different fleets proved useful to his work in the Black Sea, when having made an assessment of Soviet failings in the evacuation of Tallinn earlier in the war, he issued a directive to Pyotr Bondarenko, head of the Black Sea Fleet's Political Directorate. The directive played a role in the much more successful evacuation of Odesa.

Rogov remained in naval and political work after the war, serving without a post from April to August 1946, becoming a deputy of the Supreme Soviet of the Soviet Union's second convocation in 1946, and then a member of the Military Council of the Baltic Military District from August 1946. Rogov died suddenly on 5 December 1949 in Riga at the age of 50, and was buried in Moscow's Novodevichy Cemetery. His gravestone was sculpted by Grigory Postnikov.

== Awards and honours ==
Over his career Rogov was awarded the Order of Lenin in 1945, four Orders of the Red Banner in 1940, twice in 1944, and in 1949, the Order of the Red Star in 1936, the Orders of Nakhimov, and the Ushakov First Classes in 1944 and on 28 June 1945 respectively, and various medals. He was also awarded the Order of the Cross of Grunwald Second Class by Poland.

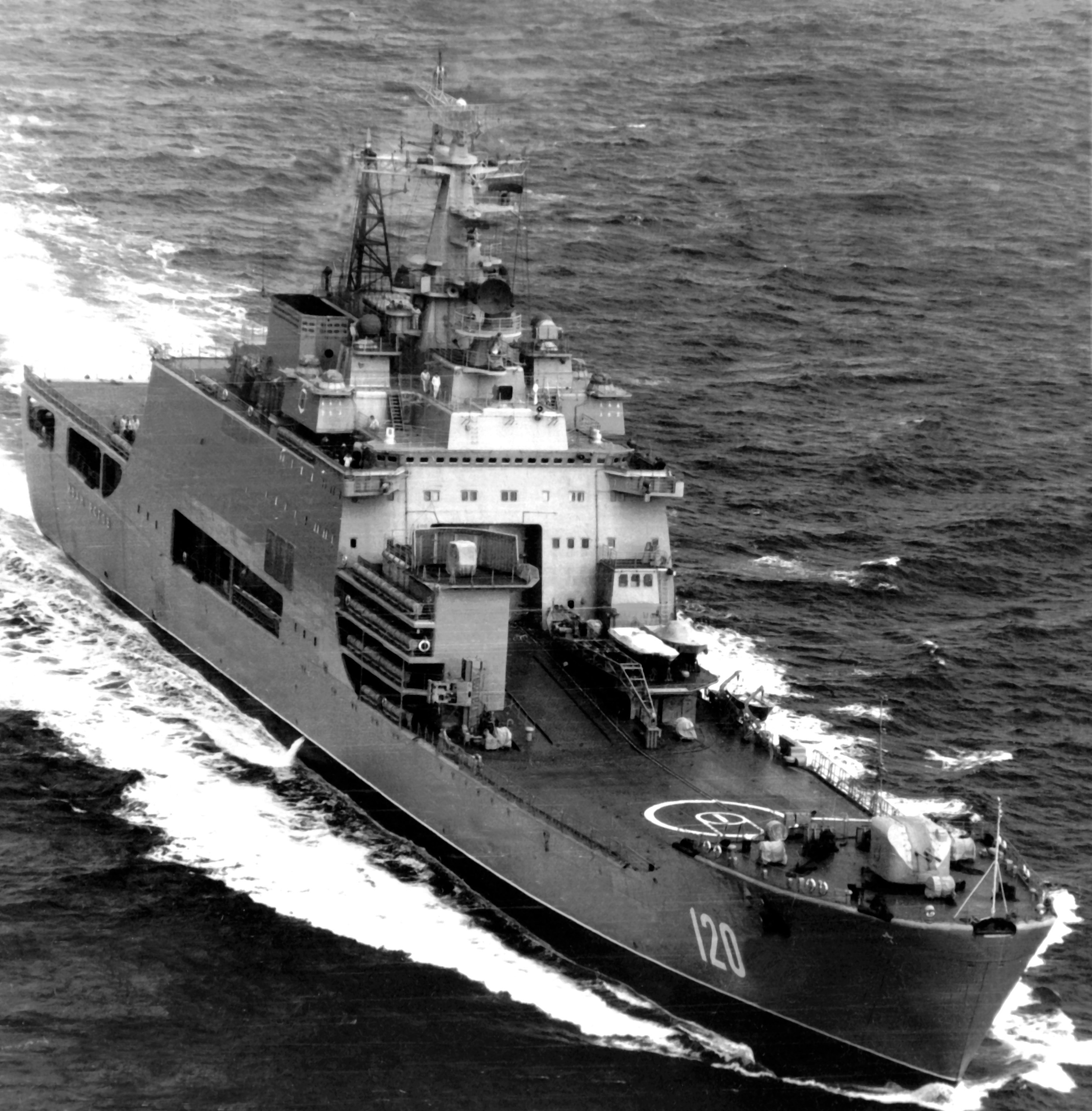
The landing ship Ivan Rogov underway in 1982

Three ships of the Soviet and Russian Navies have been named for Rogov. The first was the T43-class minesweeper T-53 in service between 1950 and 1957. The landing ship Ivan Rogov, name ship of her class, was built for the Soviet Navy and launched in 1977. She served with the Russian Navy until her decommissioning in 1995. On 20 July 2020, a new Ivan Rogov, one of the Project 23900 amphibious assault ships, was laid down at the Zaliv Shipbuilding Yard in Kerch, on the Black Sea.

== Assessment ==
In 1940 Rogov was serving under People's Commissar of the Navy, Nikolai Kuznetsov, during a period where naval expansion was taking place, and following the loss of many experienced personnel during the purges. Kuznetsov noted that "My first fears - whether he, a new person in the navy, would be able to understand the specifics of the naval service, quickly dissipated. Returning from trips to one or another fleet, Ivan Vasilyevich surprised and delighted us all with his deep understanding of the tasks that the headquarters, political agencies, ships and units of the Navy were called upon to solve." Rear-Admiral A. T. Karavayev, inspector of the Main Naval Policy Department during the war, similarly praised Rogov's ability to "quickly grasp the specifics of the structure and activities of the complex naval mechanism." Naval historians Ivan Kozlov and Vladimir Shlomin were less complimentary, calling him a "typical nomenklatura political worker" with a "tendency toward a command-and-pressure style of leadership". Writer Aleksandr Kron, who served in the Baltic Fleet during the war, noted that he was called "Ivan the Terrible" in the fleet, but that despite his toughness, "what attracted me to him was the originality of his thought, he did not tolerate cliches".
