= Aleksandr Andreyevich Nikolayev =

Soviet naval officer

- Born: 17 August 1905; Lipyagi, Kirsanovsky Uyezd, Tambov Governorate, Russian Empire
- Died: 10 October 1949 (aged 44) Moscow, Soviet Union
- Buried: Novodevichy Cemetery
- Allegiance: Soviet Union
- Branch: Soviet Navy
- Service years: 1927-1949
- Rank: Vice-Admiral
- Conflicts: Second World War
- Awards: Order of Lenin; Order of the Red Banner (three times); Order of Nakhimov First Class; Order of the Patriotic War First Class; Order of the Red Star (twice)

Aleksandr Andreyevich Nikolayev (Russian: Александр Андреевич Николаев; 17 August 1905 – 10 October 1949) was an officer of the Soviet Navy. He served during the Second World War and reached the rank of vice-admiral.

== Career ==
Nikolayev was born on 17 August 1905 in the village of Lipyagi, Kirsanovsky Uyezd, in what was then Tambov Governorate in the Russian Empire. He spent some time in the Komsomol, before joining the Communist Party in 1927. He entered the Red Navy that same year, studying at the Baltic Fleet's submarine school from 1928, and graduating with a specialisation in diesel machinery in 1929. He then served as an instructor in diesel motors at the submarine school until 1934, while also taking courses at the Leningrad Communist University and graduating in 1932. He continued to be involved with political education, and naval training more generally, serving as secretary of the school's party bureau, and a senior instructor of the political departments. From May 1933 to 1934, he was senior instructor at the political department of EON-1, the forerunner of the Northern Fleet consisting of a detachment of ships of the Baltic Fleet transferred between May and August to the Arctic Ocean via the White Sea–Baltic Canal. In August 1934 he became chief of the Northern Military Flotilla's political department.

Nikolayev enrolled in the Tolmachev Military-Political Academy's naval faculty in 1934, graduating in 1938. In January that year he was appointed senior instructor of the navy's political directorate, and commissar of a special detachment consisting of the hydrographic vessels Polyarny and Partizan on a voyage from Kronstadt to Vladivostok. From December 1938, he was military commissar for the navy's chief of staff. He was appointed to the Military Council of the Northern Fleet in 1940, serving during the Second World War under the fleet's commander, Admiral Arseny Golovko. He was promoted to divisional commissar on 17 March 1941, rear-admiral on 13 December 1942, and vice-admiral on 31 May 1944. Nikolayev transferred to the Baltic Fleet in June 1945 as a member of its military council, and when it was split into two fleets, the South Baltic Fleet from February 1946, and the 4th Fleet from April 1947. From April 1947, he was Deputy Chief of the Armed Forces's Main Political Directorate, and chairman of the Orgburo of DOSFLOT.

Nikolayev died in Moscow on 10 October 1949 at the age of 44. He was buried in the city's Novodevichy Cemetery.

== Awards and honours ==
Over his career Nikolayev was awarded the Order of Lenin, three Orders of the Red Banner, the Order of the Red Star, the Orders of Nakhimov, and the Patriotic War First Classes, and various medals.

Two ships of the Soviet and Russian Navies have been named for Nikolayev . The first was a T43-class minesweeper in service between 1950 and 1966. The Ivan Rogov-class landing ship Aleksandr Nikolayev was built for the Soviet Navy and launched in 1982. She served with the Russian Navy until her decommissioning in 2006. On 13 November 1969, Metallistov Street in Murmansk was renamed after Nikolayev.
