= Russian landing ship Mitrofan Moskalenko =

Russian Navy landing ship

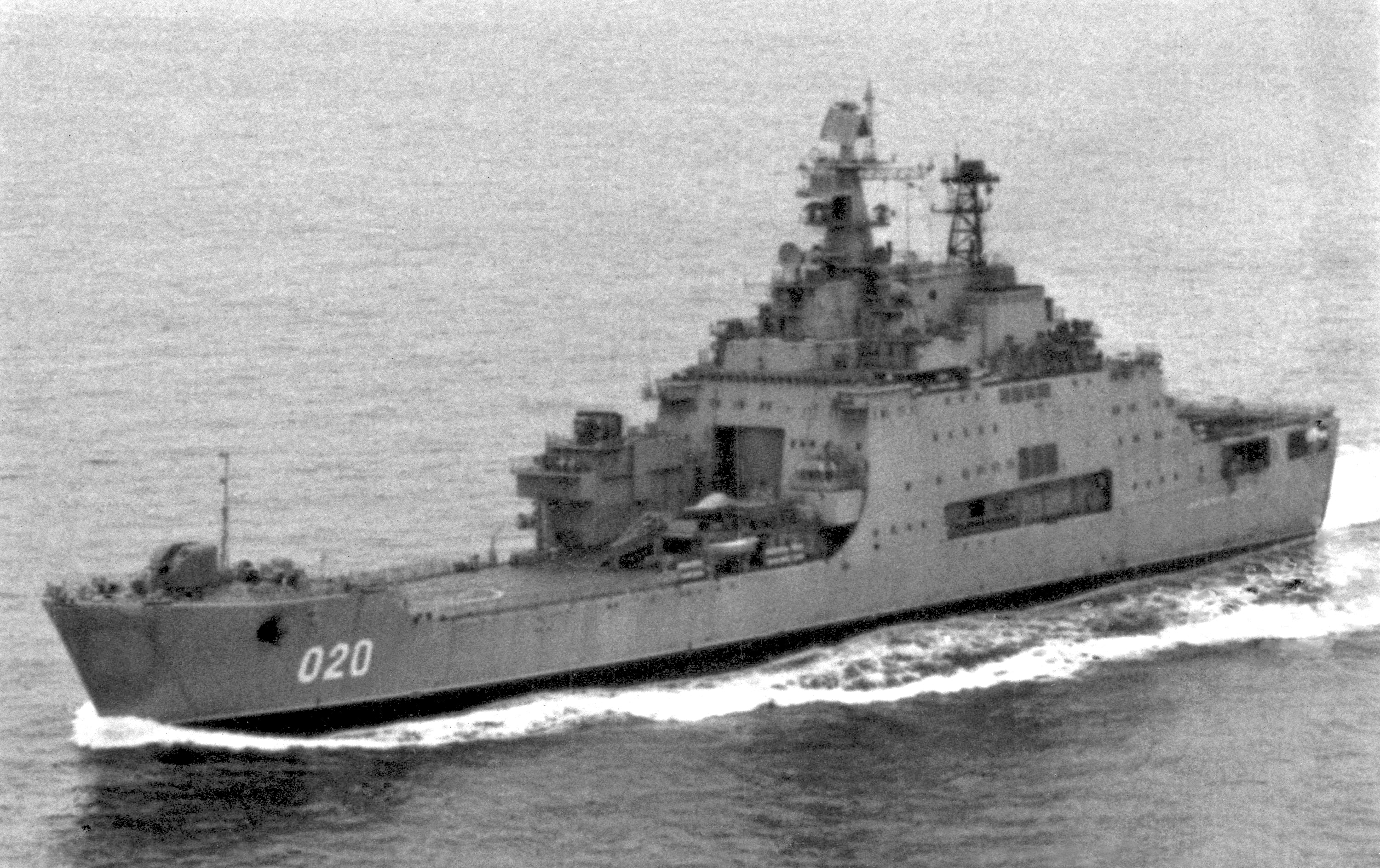

History

Russia
- Name: Mitrofan Moskalenko
- Namesake: Mitrofan Moskalenko
- Builder: Yantar Shipyard, Kaliningrad
- Yard number: 103
- Laid down: May 1984
- Launched: 1988
- Commissioned: 23 September 1990
- Decommissioned: 18 December 2006
- Home port: Severomorsk
- Identification: Hull number: 016 (1989-1991); 107 (1991-1992); 028 (1992-1995); 020 (1995-present)
- Status: Scrapping

General characteristics
- Class & type: Ivan Rogov-class landing ship
- Displacement: 11,580 tons standard; 14,060 tons full
- Length: 157 m (515 ft)
- Beam: 23.8 m (78 ft)
- Draught: 6.7 m (22 ft)
- Propulsion: 2 shafts, 2 gas turbines, 2 × 18,000 hp (13,000 kW)
- Speed: 19 knots (35 km/h)
- Range: 7,500 nmi (13,890 km) at 14 knots (26 km/h)
- Capacity: 2,500 tons of cargo
- Complement: 239
- Armament: Osa-M surface-to-air missile system (1 × 2 launchers, 20 missiles); 76 mm AK-726 multipurpose gun (1 × 2 with 1000 rounds); 30 mm AK-630 air defence gun (4 × 6-barreled mounts with 16,000 cartridges); Grad-m 122 mm rocket launcher (1 with 320 rockets)
- Aircraft carried: 4 × Kamov Ka-27 or Ka-29 helicopters

Mitrofan Moskalenko (Russian: Митрофан Москаленко) was a Ivan Rogov-class landing ship of the Russian Navy and part of the Northern Fleet.

Named after the Soviet Navy officer Mitrofan Moskalenko, the ship was built in Kaliningrad and launched in 1988. She was decommissioned in 2006 and has been put up for scrapping.

== Construction and commissioning ==
Mitrofan Moskalenko was built by Yantar Shipyard, in Kaliningrad. She was laid down in May 1984, and launched in 1988. She was commissioned into the Soviet Navy on 23 September 1990 as part of its Northern Fleet, homeported in Severomorsk, and with the dissolution of the Soviet Union in late December 1991, she went on to serve in the Russian Navy.

== Career ==
Mitrofan Moskalenko was one of a three ship class, designated by the Russians as Project 1174 (Russian: «Носорог», romanized: Nosorog, lit. 'Rhinoceros'). The ships were classified as BDK (Russian: БДК) for Russian: Большой десантный корабль, romanized: Bolshoy desantnyi korabl', lit. 'large landing ship'. Mitrofan Moskalenko was the only ship of her class to be assigned to the Northern Fleet, her sister ships Ivan Rogov and Aleksandr Nikolayev were both assigned to the Pacific Fleet. On completion at Kaliningrad, she sailed to Severomorsk and became the flagship of the Northern Fleet's 37th Landing Ship Division.

With the dissolution of the Soviet Union and the withdrawal of naval forces and equipment from Eastern Europe and former Soviet republics, Mitrofan Moskalenko made five voyages in 1991 and 1992, transporting useful military cargo from the reduced Baltic Fleet, bringing it for use with the Northern Fleet. In 1994, she became part of the Atlantic Surface Ship Squadron, and in July 2001, was assigned to the Kola Flotilla.

== Decommissioning and scrapping ==
Mitrofan Moskalenko was reduced to the reserve in 2002, and decommissioned on 18 December 2006. Her sister Aleksandr Nikolayev was decommissioned on the same day, while her other sister, Ivan Rogov, had been decommissioned on 4 August 1995.

Mitrofan Moskalenko was put up for sale in 2008, and after a reassessment in 2012, which found that modernizing her would cost as much as a new ship, tenders were again invited. By 2013, she was still at Severomorsk. Russia had by this point ordered two Mistral-class landing helicopter docks from France to supplement their amphibious warfare capabilities, but with the outbreak of the Russo-Ukrainian War in 2014, delivery of the ships was suspended, and then abandoned. Naval planners briefly considered reactivating the mothballed Mitrofan Moskalenko and Aleksandr Nikolayev instead. She was again put up for sale for scrapping in May 2014. Reports suggested that she left Severmorsk for Murmansk on 8 May 2019 to be scrapped at the 35th Ship Repair Plant. Ukrainian sources reported that she caught fire while docked on 27 May 2019. Further reports in November 2019 recorded that she had arrived at Shipyard Number 10 in Polyarny to be scrapped by a private company. She caught fire while docked at the yard on 8 December 2020.

On 20 July 2020, a new Mitrofan Moskalenko, one of the Project 23900 amphibious assault ships, was laid down at the Zaliv Shipbuilding Yard in Kerch, on the Black Sea.
