= Russian landing ship Ivan Rogov =

Russian Navy landing ship

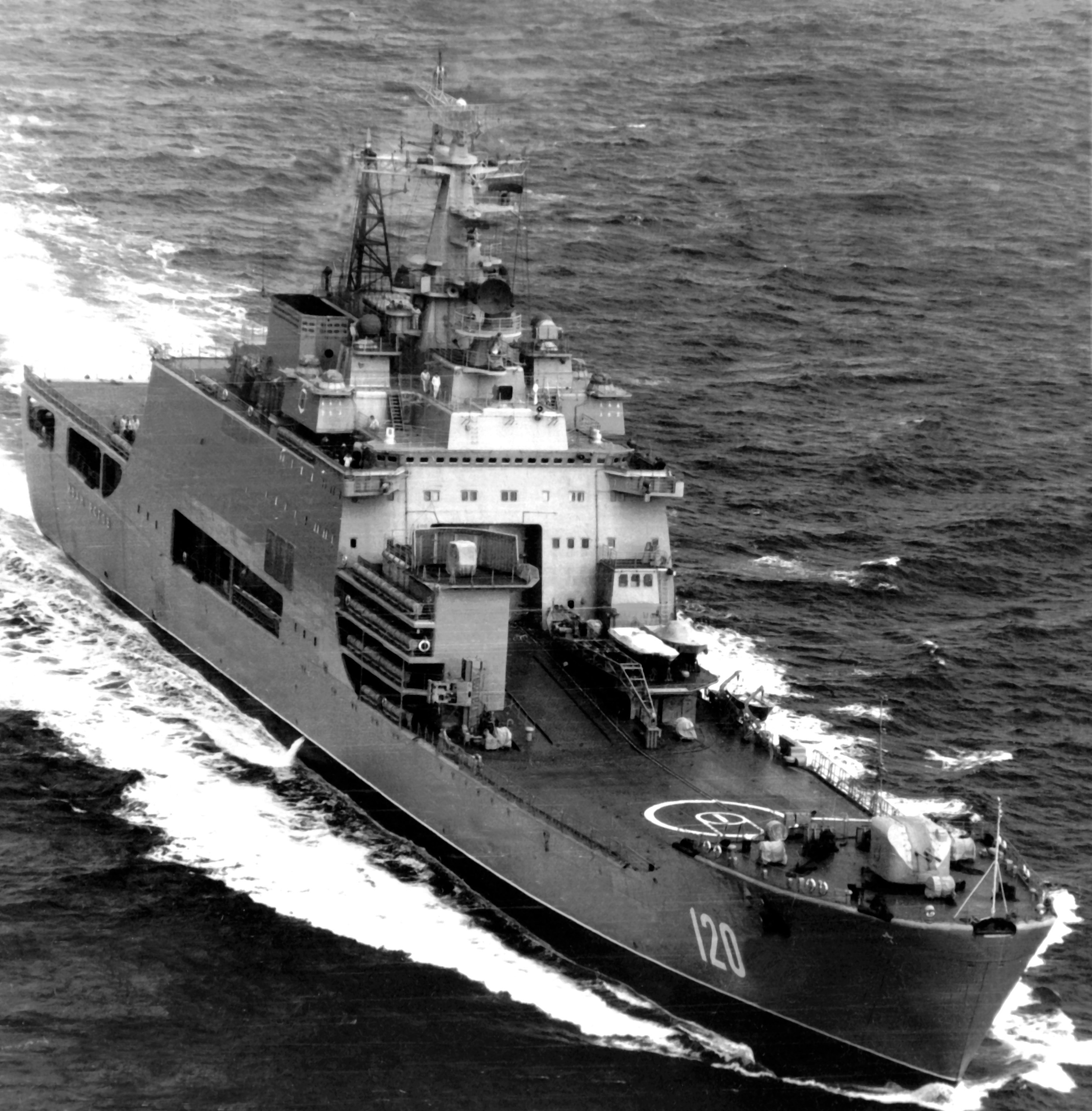

History

Russia
- Name: Ivan Rogov
- Namesake: Ivan Rogov
- Builder: Yantar Shipyard, Kaliningrad
- Yard number: 101
- Laid down: 17 September 1973
- Launched: 15 May 1977
- Commissioned: 15 June 1978
- Decommissioned: 4 August 1995
- Home port: Fokino, Primorsky Krai
- Identification: Hull number: 556 (1977-1978); 111 (1978); 120 (1978); 132 (1978-1979); 050 (1979-1981); 099 (1981-1984); 113 (1984-1987); 067 (1987-May 1990); 084 (May 1990-1998)
- Fate: Scrapped, 1997-1998

General characteristics
- Class & type: Ivan Rogov-class landing ship
- Displacement: 11,580 tons standard; 14,060 tons full
- Length: 157 m (515 ft)
- Beam: 23.8 m (78 ft)
- Draught: 6.7 m (22 ft)
- Propulsion: 2 shafts, 2 gas turbines, 2 × 18,000 hp (13,000 kW)
- Speed: 19 knots (35 km/h)
- Range: 7,500 nmi (13,890 km) at 14 knots (26 km/h)
- Capacity: 2,500 tons of cargo
- Complement: 239
- Armament: Osa-M surface-to-air missile system (1 × 2 launchers, 20 missiles); 76 mm AK-726 multipurpose gun (1 × 2 with 1000 rounds); 30 mm AK-630 air defence gun (4 × 6-barreled mounts with 16,000 cartridges); Grad-m 122 mm rocket launcher (1 with 320 rockets); 2 x 45 mm 21KM salute guns (from December 1979)
- Aircraft carried: 4 × Kamov Ka-27 or Ka-29 helicopters

Ivan Rogov (Russian: Иван Рогов) was a Ivan Rogov-class landing ship of the Russian Navy and part of the Pacific Fleet.

Named after the Soviet Navy officer Ivan Rogov, the ship was built in Kaliningrad and launched in 1977. She was decommissioned in 1995 and subsequently scrapped.

== Construction and commissioning ==
Ivan Rogov was built by Yantar Shipyard, in Kaliningrad. She was laid down on 17 September 1973, and launched on 15 May 1977. She carried out her mooring trials from 13 November 1977 to 15 May 1978, and then sea trials from 16 May to 2 June 1978. Official state trials were held from 3 June to 15 June, and with their successful completion, she was commissioned into the Soviet Navy on 15 June 1978 as part of its Pacific Fleet, homeported in Fokino, Primorsky Krai, and with the dissolution of the Soviet Union in late December 1991, she went on to serve in the Russian Navy.

== Career ==
Ivan Rogov was one of a three ship class, designated by the Russians as Project 1174 (Russian: «Носорог», romanized: Nosorog, lit. 'Rhinoceros'). The ships were classified as BDK (Russian: БДК) for Russian: Большой десантный корабль, romanized: Bolshoy desantnyi korabl', lit. 'large landing ship'. Ivan Rogov and her sister ship Aleksandr Nikolayev were both assigned to the Pacific Fleet, while the third ship, Mitrofan Moskalenko was assigned to the Northern Fleet. She was fitted with two 45 mm 21 km salute guns in December 1979.

Having been commissioned, Ivan Rogov sailed on 27 February 1979 with the aircraft carrier Minsk from Europe to the Pacific, calling at Luanda in Angola, Maputo in Mozambique, Port Louis in Mauritius, and Aden in the People's Democratic Republic of Yemen. She arrived in Vladivostok on 3 July 1979. She returned to the Yantar Shipyard for a refit that lasted from May 1982 to December 1985.

== Decommissioning and scrapping ==
Ivan Rogov was decommissioned on 4 August 1995. Both of her sisters, Mitrofan Moskalenko and Aleksandr Nikolayev, were reduced to the reserve in 1997, and decommissioned on 18 December 2006. Ivan Rogov was scrapped at the Dalzavod works between 1997 and 1998.

On 20 July 2020, a new Ivan Rogov, one of the Project 23900 amphibious assault ships, was laid down at the Zaliv Shipbuilding Yard in Kerch, on the Black Sea.
