= Main Political Directorate of the Soviet Army and Soviet Navy =

Military-political organ in the Soviet Union

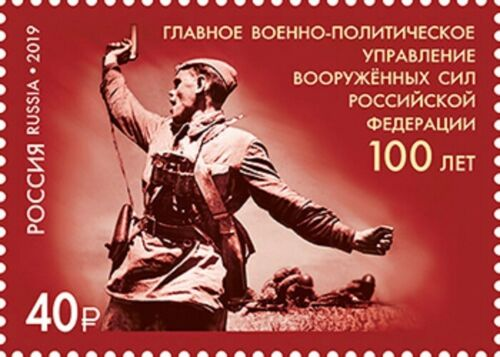
A post stamp of the Russian Federation released in 2019 commemorating 100th Anniversary of the state institution

The Main Political Directorate of the Soviet Army and Soviet Navy (Russian: Главное политическое управление Советской армии и Военно-морского флота СССР, romanized: Glavnoe politicheskoe upravlenie Sovietskoy armii i Voenno-morskogo flota SSSR) was the central military-political organ of administration in the Soviet Armed Forces in 1919 through 1991 and controlled by the Communist Party of the Soviet Union.

The directorate was created at the 7th Congress of the Russian Communist Party (Bolsheviks) on the order of the Republic's Revolutionary Military Council No.674 of 18 April 1919 to implement political control in the Red Army and Fleet.

== Names and leaders ==
Revolutionary Military Council (RMC)
Politdepartment and politdirectorate of the Republic's RMC (1919–1922): 31 May 1919 — ?? January 1921 — Ivar Smilga (1892–1937); 3 January 1921 — 13 May 1921 — Vasiliy Solovyov (1890–1939); 13 May 1921 — 9 January 1922 — Sergey Gusev (1874–1933)
Political directorate of the Soviet RMC (1922–1924): 9 January 1922 — 28 August 1922 — Leonid Serebryakov (1888–1937); 28 August 1922 — 17 January 1924 — Vladimir Antonov-Ovseyenko (1883–1938); 17 January—28 March 1924 — Andrei Bubnov (1884–1938)
Army	Fleet
Political directorate of the WP Red Army (1924–1940): 28 March 1924 — 1 October 1929 — Andrei Bubnov; 1 October 1929 — 31 May 1937 — Yan Gamarnik (1894–1937), Army Commissar of 1st rank; June—December 1937 — Pyotr Smirnov (1897–1939), Army Commissar of 1st rank; 30 December 1937 — 25 July 1940 — Lev Mekhlis (1889–1953), Army Commissar of 1st rank	Political directorate of the WP Red Fleet (1938–1940): January —June 1938 — Mikhail Shaposhnikov (1899–1938), Corps Commissar; 21 June 1938 — ?? May 1939 — Ivan Nadyoshin (1900–1958), Brigade Commissar; ?? May 1939 — ?? August 1940 — Ivan Rogov (1899–1949), Army Commissar of 2nd rank
Main directorate of political propaganda of the Red Army (1940–1941): 25 July—6 September 1940 — Lev Mekhlis, Army Commissar of 1st rank; 6 September 1940 — 21 June 1941 — Aleksandr Zaporozhets (1899–1959), Army Commissar of 1st rank; 21 June—16 July 1941 — Lev Mekhlis, Army Commissar of 1st rank	Main directorate of political propaganda of the Soviet Navy (1940–1941): ?? August 1940 — 22 July 1941 — Ivan Rogov, Army Commissar of 2nd rank
Main political directorate of the WP Red Army (1941–1946): 16 July 1941 — 12 June 1942 — Lev Mekhlis, Corps Commissar (с 04.06.1942); 12 June 1942 — 10 May 1945 — Aleksandr Shcherbakov (1901–1945), Colonel General; 8 September 1945 — ?? February 1946 — Iosif Shikin (1906–1973), Colonel General	Main political directorate of the Soviet Navy (1941–1946): 22 July 1941 — ?? February 1946 — Ivan Rogov, Colonel General
Soviet Armed Forces
Main political directorate of the Soviet Armed Forces (1946–1950): ?? February 1946 — ?? February 1949 — Iosif Shikin, Colonel General; ?? February 1949 — ?? February 1950 — Fyodor Kuznetsov (1904–1979), Colonel General
Army	Fleet
Main political directorate of the Soviet Army (1950–1953): February—March 1950 — Fyodor Kuznetsov, Colonel General; March—July 1950 — Konstantin Kraynyukov, (1902–1975), Colonel General; ?? July 1950 — ?? April 1953 — Fyodor Kuznetsov, Colonel General	Main political directorate of the Soviet Navy (1950–1953): ?? March 1950 — 6 March 1953 — Semyon Zakharov (1906–1986), Admiral; June—16 March 1953 — Leonid Brezhnev (1906–1982), Major General
Soviet Ministry of Defense
Main political directorate of the Soviet MOD (1953–1958): ?? April 1953 — ?? January 1958 — Aleksey Zheltov (1904–1991), Colonel General; January 1958 — 25 April 1958 — Filipp Golikov (1900–1980), Colonel General
Soviet Army and Soviet Navy
Main political directorate of the Soviet Army and Soviet Navy (1958–1991): 25 April 1958 — 30 April 1962 — Filipp Golikov, Marshal of the Soviet Union; 30 April 1962 — 17 July 1985 — Alexei Yepishev (1908–1985), General of the Army; 17 July 1985 — ?? July 1990 — Aleksey Lizichev (1928–2006), General of the Army; ?? July 1990 — 11 January 1991 — Nikolay Shlyaga (1935–2004), Colonel General
Soviet Armed Forces
Main military-political directorate of the Soviet Armed Forces (1991): 11 January—29 August 1991 — Nikolay Shlyaga (1935–2004), Colonel General

== Educational institutions ==
=== Military-political academy ===
- Lenin Military-Political Academy (Moscow)

=== Military-political colleges (higher schools) ===
- KGB Military-Political Border Service College (Golitsyno, Moscow Oblast)
- General Yepishev Military-Political College of Engineers and Signal troops (Donetsk)
- Kiev Naval Political College (Kiev)
- Kurgan Military-Political Aviation College (Kurgan, Kurgan Oblast)
- Komsomol 60th Anniversary MVD Political College (Leningrad)
- Andropov Military-Political College of Anti-Aircraft Defense (Leningrad)
- Military-Political College (Lviv)
- Military-Political Combined Arms College (Minsk)
- Great October 60th Anniversary Military-Political Combined Arms College (Novosibirsk)
- Marshal of the Soviet Union Biryuzov Military-Political College (Riga)
- Brezhnev Military-Political Tank-Artillery College (Sverdlovsk)
- Military-Political Construction College (Simferopol)
- Military-Political Construction College (Tallinn)
- Military-Political Faculty of the Marshal of Artillery Nedelin Command and Engineer College

== See also ==
- Political commissar
- Commissar Order

== Resources ==
- Тезисы ПУРа, согласованные с АПО ЦК ВКП(б) и материалы для докладов на собраниях, посвящённых XI годовщине РККА. Н. Новгород. 1929. Archived from the original on 2014-04-22.
- КПСС в резолюциях и решениях съездов, конференций и пленума ЦК, 7 изд., ч. 1. — М., 1954.
- КПСС о Вооружённых Силах Советского Союза. Документы 1917–1968. — М.: Воениздат, 1969.
- Мозговой С. А. «Не за страх, а за совесть…». К 100-летию создания Политорганов ВМФ // Морской сборник, 2019, No. 5. С. 38–41.
- Петров Ю. П. Строительство политорганов, партийных и комсомольских организаций Армии и Флота. — М.: Воениздат, 1968.
