= Russian landing ship Aleksandr Nikolayev =

Russian Navy landing ship

History

Russia
- Name: Aleksandr Nikolayev
- Namesake: Aleksandr Nikolayev
- Builder: Yantar Shipyard, Kaliningrad
- Yard number: 102
- Laid down: 22 February 1976
- Launched: 20 April 1982
- Commissioned: 31 December 1982
- Decommissioned: 18 December 2006
- Home port: Fokino, Primorsky Krai
- Identification: Hull number: 110 (1982–1984); 050 (1984–1987); 074 (1987–1990); 057 (May 1990–present)
- Fate: Scrapped, 2022

General characteristics
- Class & type: Ivan Rogov-class landing ship
- Displacement: 11,580 tons standard; 14,060 tons full
- Length: 157 m (515 ft)
- Beam: 23.8 m (78 ft)
- Draught: 6.7 m (22 ft)
- Installed power: 2 × 18,000 hp (13,000 kW)
- Propulsion: 2 shafts, 2 gas turbines
- Speed: 19 knots (35 km/h)
- Range: 7,500 nmi (13,890 km) at 14 knots (26 km/h)
- Capacity: 2,500 tons of cargo
- Complement: 239
- Armament: Osa-M surface-to-air missile system (1 × 2 launchers, 20 missiles); 76 mm AK-726 multipurpose gun (1 × 2 with 1,000 rounds); 30 mm AK-630 air defence gun (4 × 6-barreled mounts with 16,000 cartridges); Grad-m 122 mm rocket launcher (1 with 320 rockets)
- Aircraft carried: 4 × Kamov Ka-27 or Ka-29 helicopters

Aleksandr Nikolayev (Russian: Александр Николаев) was a Ivan Rogov-class landing ship of the Russian Navy and part of the Pacific Fleet.

Named after the Soviet Navy officer Vice-Admiral Aleksandr Nikolayev, the ship was built in Kaliningrad and launched in 1982. She was decommissioned in 2006, and scrapped after 2022.

== Construction and commissioning ==
Aleksandr Nikolayev was built by Yantar Shipyard, in Kaliningrad. She was laid down on 22 February 1976, and launched on 20 April 1982. She was commissioned into the Soviet Navy on 31 December 1982 as part of its Pacific Fleet, homeported in Fokino, Primorsky Krai, and with the dissolution of the Soviet Union in late December 1991, she went on to serve in the Russian Navy.

== Career ==
Aleksandr Nikolayev was one of a three ship class, designated by the Russians as Project 1174 (Russian: «Носорог», romanized: Nosorog, lit. 'Rhinoceros'). The ships were classified as BDK (Russian: БДК) for Russian: Большой десантный корабль, romanized: Bolshoy desantnyi korabl', lit. 'large landing ship'. Aleksandr Nikolayev and her sister ship Ivan Rogov were both assigned to the Pacific Fleet, while the third ship, Mitrofan Moskalenko was assigned to the Northern Fleet. Having been commissioned, she was assigned to the fleet's 22nd Marine Landing Division, based at Russky Island in Ivantsov Bay.

Оn 17 October 1983, Aleksandr Nikolayev was part of a detachment consisting of the aircraft carrier Novorossiysk, the cruiser Nikolayev, the frigate Poryvistyy and a tanker, under the command of the Rear-Admiral Rostislav Dymov, chief of the Pacific Fleet's 10th Operational Squadron. En route, the vessels called at Luanda, Angola, between 12 and 20 November, Maputo, Mozambique, between 1 and 9 December, Victoria, Seychelles, between 8 and 13 December and Madras, India, between 5 and 10 February. She arrived at Vladivostok on 27 February 1984. In 1984, Aleksandr Nikolayev, the aircraft carrier Minsk, and Vietnamese forces conducted the Soviet Navy's first amphibious landing in Vietnam. She took part in exercises in winter 1984, and again in autumn 1987 under the command of Captain 1st Rank Nikolai Kochergin. With the outbreak of the Iran–Iraq War in 1988, and the start of Operation Desert Storm in early 1990, Aleksandr Nikolayev was several times deployed into the Gulf of Oman and the Persian Gulf to escort Soviet merchant vessels. She carried out further exercises in summer 1989, and from November 1989 to January 1990, she transported 14 MiG-23 aircraft and vehicles from Cam Ranh Base, Vietnam.

== Decommissioning and scrapping ==
Aleksandr Nikolayev was reduced to the reserve in 1997, and decommissioned on 18 December 2006. Her sister Mitrofan Moskalenko was decommissioned on the same day, while her other sister, Ivan Rogov, had been decommissioned on 4 August 1995. She was put up for sale in 2008, though she was still laid up at Fokino in 2013, next to the also decommissioned SSV-33 Ural. Russia had by this point ordered two Mistral-class landing helicopter docks from France to supplement their amphibious warfare capabilities, but with the outbreak of the Russo-Ukrainian War in 2014, delivery of the ships was suspended, and then abandoned. Naval planners briefly considered reactivating the mothballed Mitrofan Moskalenko and Aleksandr Nikolayev instead.

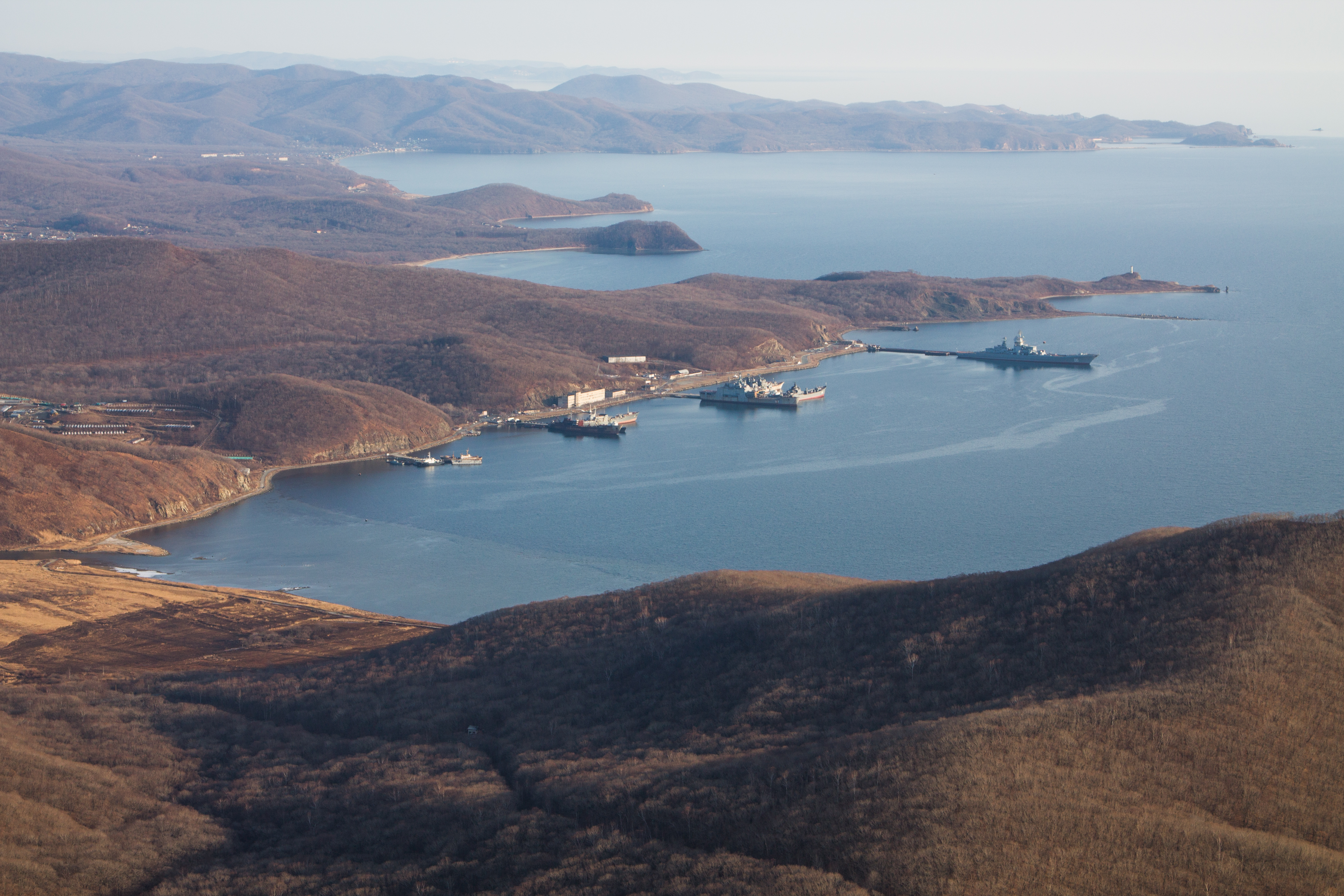
Abrek Bay in 2014. The decommissioned Aleksandr Nikolayev is visible in the centre.

In April 2016, the Ministry of Defence announced another tender for the disposal of the Aleksandr Nikolayev. She was still laid up with a skeleton crew at Fokino in May 2019, and "no decisions have been made about it yet" according to a source speaking to TASS. On 29 January 2021, strong winds broke the ship free from her moorings. She was run aground to prevent collisions with other vessels, and returned to her moorings with the help of tugs on 1 February, when the weather had subsided. She was scrapped in 2022.
