= Order of Nakhimov =

Russian award for outstanding military leadership

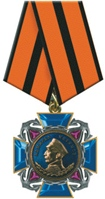
- The Order of Nakhimov (Obverse)
- Type: Single grade order
- Awarded for: Outstanding military leadership
- Presented by: Russian Federation; USSR
- Eligibility: Naval officers
- Status: Active
- Established: March 3, 1944
- Ribbon of the Order of Nakhimov

Precedence
- Next (higher): Order of Kutuzov
- Next (lower): Order of Courage

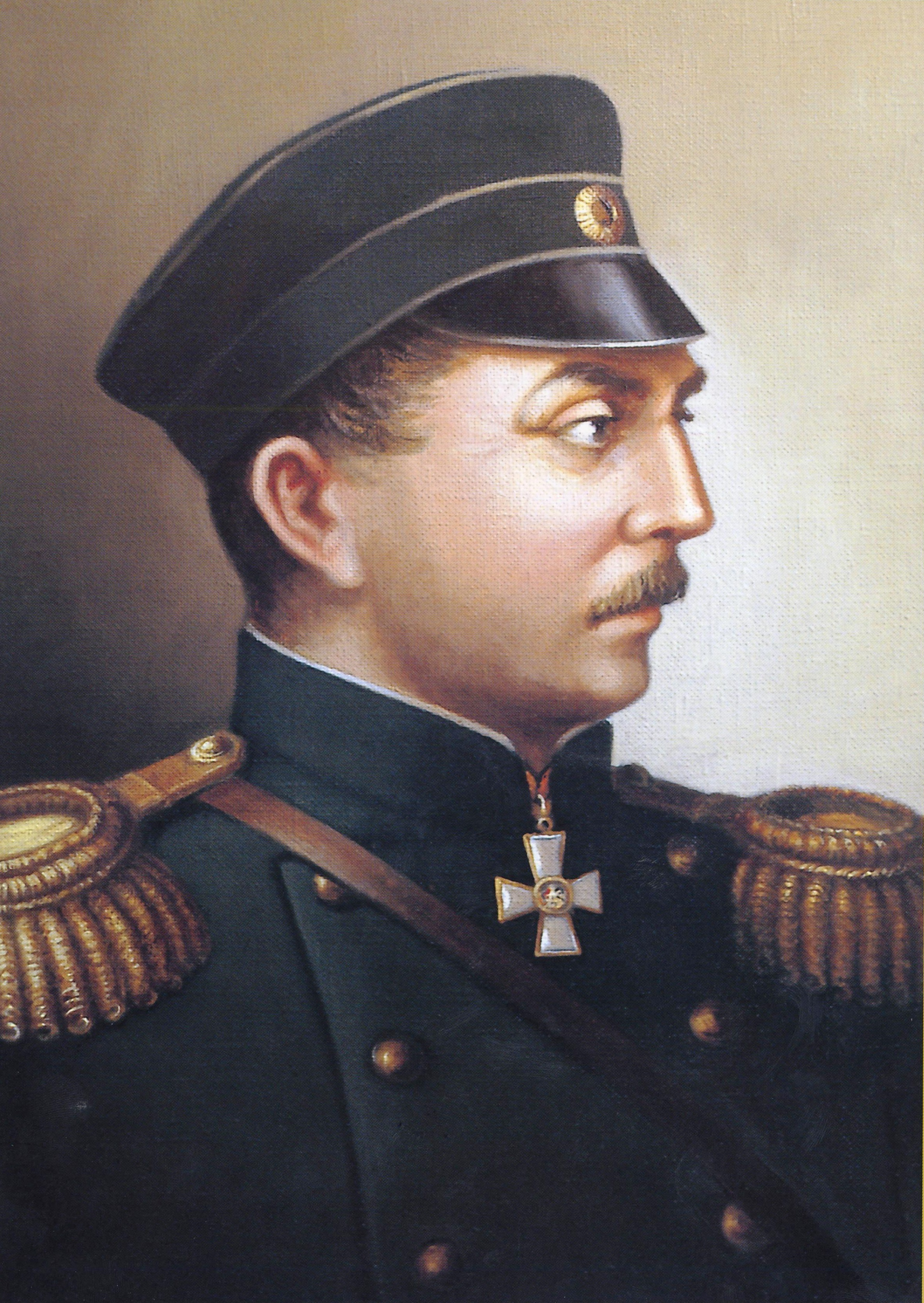
Admiral Pavel Nakhimov

The Order of Nakhimov (Russian: орден Нахимова) is a military decoration of the Russian Federation named in honour of Russian admiral Pavel Nakhimov (1802–1855) and bestowed to naval officers for outstanding military leadership. The order was established during World War II by decree of the Presidium of the Supreme Soviet of the USSR of March 3, 1944. Following the 1991 dissolution of the USSR, the Order of Nakhimov was retained unchanged by decision of the Supreme Soviet of the Russian Federation No. 2424-1 of March 2, 1992 but it was not awarded in this form. The all encompassing Decree of the President of the Russian Federation No. 1099 of September 7, 2010 that modernised and reorganised the entire Russian awards system away from its Soviet past amended the Order of Nakhimov to its present form, a ribbon mounted single class Order.

== Soviet statute ==
From its establishment in 1944 until September 2010, the Order of Nakhimov was awarded in two classes to officers of the Navy for outstanding achievements in the development, implementation and prosecution of naval operations resulting in the successful repelling of an opponent's offensive or for active fleet operations that caused considerable damage to the enemy while conserving fleet assets.

The Order of Nakhimov 1st class was awarded to naval officers for:

- cleverly planned and well executed operations coordinated with all naval forces in defensive positions, which led to the destruction and harassment of numerically superior enemy naval forces;
- excellent management, bold and decisive leadership of individual actions of units and formations of the fleet engaged in naval battle or from coastal positions that led to the destruction of major enemy units, or caused it to fail to perform its tasks, while maintaining the combat readiness of its units or installations;
- a well planned and successfully prosecuted anti amphibious operation which resulted in the enemy suffering great losses, lowering their combat effectiveness to the point of having to abandon the landing;
- successful conduct of combat operations to ensure operation of the fleet at sea, their communication and defence of bases and coastlines;
- well-organized and prosecuted naval operations protecting the flank of the Red Army's active operations and naval assaults of enemy held coastlines;

The Order of Nakhimov 2nd class was awarded to naval officers for:

- skilled and courageous action and personal leadership in the defence of lines of communication, bases and coastlines, which led to the destruction of large enemy forces successfully repelling the attack;
- well-organized and successfully conducted de mining operations off the enemy coast, which ensured fleet operations and led to the destruction of important enemy naval assets;
- well-organized and successfully conducted mine laying operations in enemy waters and near its coastlines, which assisted in the active operation of the fleet;
- displaying personal courage in the successful execution of combat missions which led to the destruction of enemy naval assets;
- outstanding leadership of subordinates in battle that led to victory over a numerically superior enemy while maintaining combat effectiveness of naval assets;
- skilful support of operations which resulted in a major military victory.

The Order of Nakhimov 1st class was worn on the right side of the chest and when in the presence of other Orders of the USSR, located immediately after the Order of Kutuzov 1st class. The Order 2nd class was also worn on the right side and located immediately after the Order of Kutuzov 2nd class.

== Soviet and pre September 2010 award description ==
The Order of Nakhimov 1st class was of multi part construction consisting of a gold five pointed star displaying radiant rays, the bottom arm pointing straight down, a silver five pointed star with each arm ending in a naval sea anchor, its upper arm pointing straight up with the rays of the gold star protruding between its arms, a central gold medallion covered with dark enamel and the gold left profile relief image of the bust of admiral Nakhimov over two laurel branches at the center of the medallion, above the admiral's head along the medallion's upper circumference, the inscription in gilt letters "ADMIRAL NAKHIMOV" (Russian: АДМИРАЛ НАХИМОВ). The hammer and sickle bisected the laurel branches on the central medallion. Five triangular red rubies were affixed to the silver star, one on each arm pointing out from the central medallion's outer edge. On the reverse of the silver star, a threaded screw and a 33 mm in diameter nut arrangement for attachment to clothing. The maker's (mint) mark was located at the upper part of the gold star's reverse, the award serial number was hand etched in the lower part. The Order of Nakhimov 2nd class was of two part construction and made entirely of silver with red enamel in lieu of rubies.

The only noticeable difference between the Soviet and early Russian Federation variants was the abrogation of the hammer and sickle from the latter.

First Class 1944–1991	Second Class 1944–1991	First Class 1992–2010	Second Class 1992–2010
Ribbons

== Soviet recipients (partial list) ==
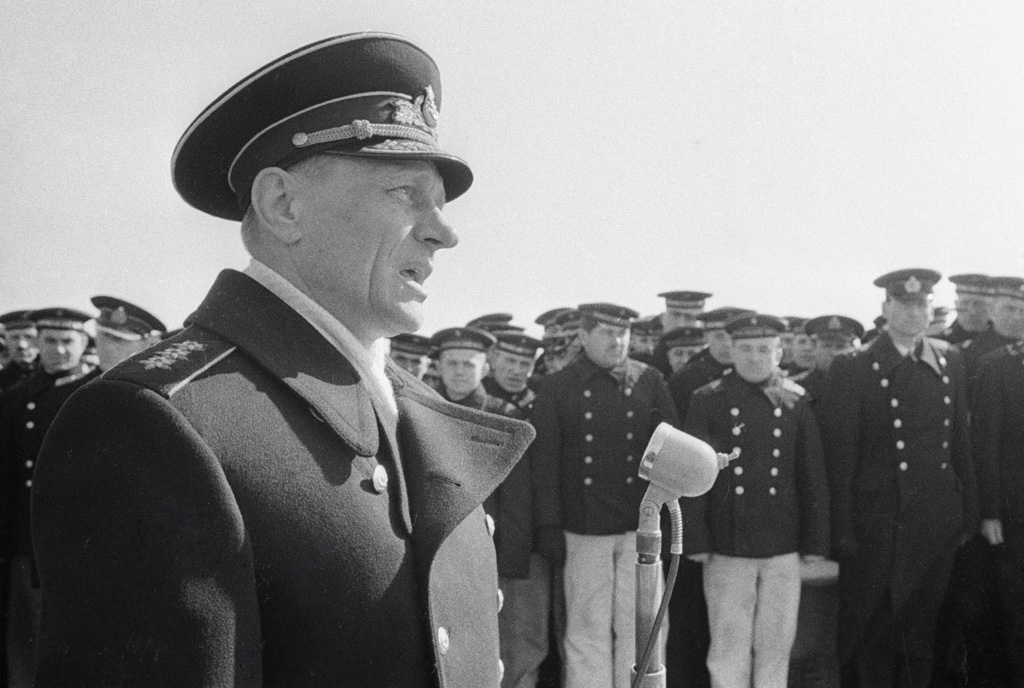
Admiral Nikolai Amelko, a recipient of both classes of the Order of Nakhimov

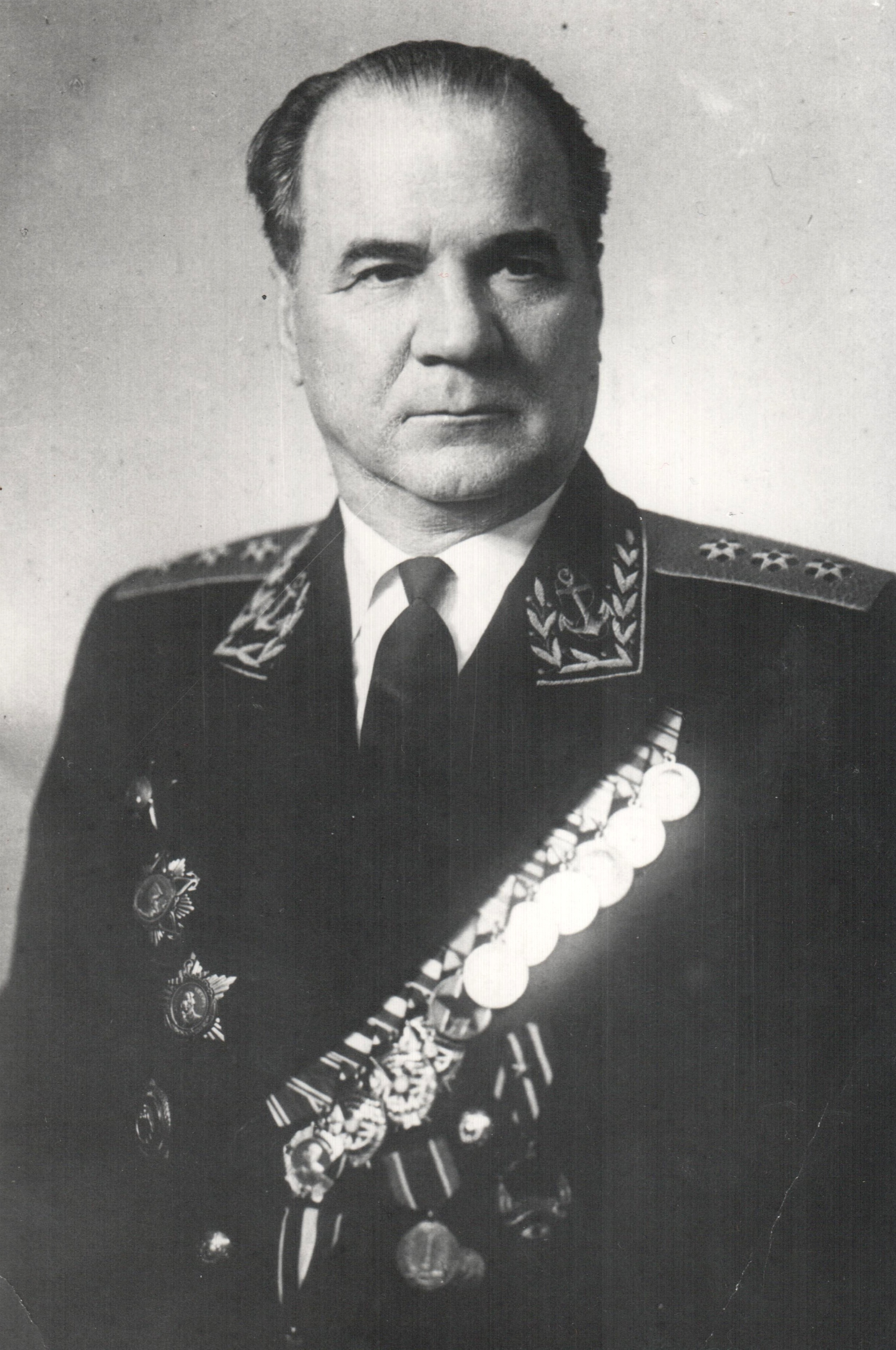
Admiral Nikolay Mikhaylovich Kharlamov, a recipient of the Order of Nakhimov 1st class

The Order first class was awarded 82 times, including twice to naval units, such as the 1st torpedo-boat brigade of Sevastopol and the 1st Red Banner torpedo-boat brigade of the Baltic Fleet. The first award of the Order first class was to Lieutenant-General Pyotr Morgunov on 16 May 1944. The Order second class was awarded 469 times, including twice to naval units.

The individuals listed below were awarded the Soviet variant of the Order of Nakhimov 1st class:

- Admiral Nikolay Mikhaylovich Kharlamov
- Rear-Admiral Ivan Isidorovich Nosenko
- Admiral Stepan Grigorievich Kucherov
- Admiral Filipp Sergeyevich Oktyabrskiy
- Admiral Arseniy Grigoriyevich Golovko
- Admiral Vladimir Filippovich Tributs
- Admiral of the Fleet Ivan Matveyevich Kapitanets
- Rear-Admiral Ivan Dmitrievich Papanin
- Admiral Yuri Aleksandrovich Panteleyev
- Admiral Nikolai Nikolaevich Amelko (both classes)
- Coastguard Colonel-General Ivan Vasilyevich Rogov
- Coastguard Colonel-General Mitrofan Ivanovich Moskalenko
- Coastguard Lieutenant-General Pyotr Alekseyevich Morgunov
- Rear-Admiral Aleksandr Petrovich Aleksandrov
- Vice-Admiral Aleksandr Grigoryevich Orlov
- Marshal of Aviation Semyon Fyodorovich Zhavoronkov
- Admiral Vitaly Alekseyevich Fokin
- Vice-Admiral Ilya Danilovich Kulishov
- Vice-Admiral Nikolai Mikhailovich Kulakov
- Vice-Admiral Yuri Fedorovich Rall
- Vice-Admiral Georgy Andreyevich Stepanov
- Vice-Admiral Ivan Ivanovich Gren
- Vice-Admiral Aleksandr Andreyevich Nikolayev
- Admiral Vladimir Aleksandrovich Andreyev
- Vice-Admiral Gavriil Vasilyevich Zhukov

The individuals listed below were awarded the Soviet variant of the Order of Nakhimov 2nd class:

- Admiral Vladimir Afanasyevich Kasatonov
- Admiral of the Fleet Nikolai Dmitriyevich Sergeyev
- Vice-Admiral Grigori Ivanovich Shchedrin
- Captain 1st Rank Yaroslav Konstantinovich Iosseliani
- Captain 3rd Rank Yuri Konstantinovich Khlebnikov
- Captain of naval aviation Dmitry Mitrofanovich Tatarenko
- Vice-Admiral Mikhail Petrovich Avgustinovich
- Major of naval aviation Aleksandr Ermolaevich Gurgenidze
- Rear-Admiral Sergei Dmitrievich Zyuzin
- Rear-Admiral Maksim Petrovich Skriganov
- Lieutenant Colonel of naval aviation Nikolai Alekseevich Musatov
- Captain-Lieutenant Athanasios Ivanovich Ivannikov
- Rear-Admiral Konstantin Konstantinovich Rodionov
- Fleet Admiral Vladimir Afanas'evich Kasatonov
- Captain 1st Rank Nicholai Georgievich Tanskii

== Statute of the modern award ==
The Order of Nakhimov is awarded to officers of the Navy for:

- success in planning and conducting naval operations of combat formations (troops of naval infantry), which resulted in successfully repelling an enemy offensive by inflicting heavy losses;
- having skilfully organized and conducted the operations of naval combat formations (troops) in cooperation with other services of the Armed Forces of the Russian Federation, which resulted in the defeat of numerically superior enemy forces;
- having skilfully organized and conducted a counterattack which resulted in the defeat of an enemy amphibious assault;
- success in leadership of landings, for the successful execution of combat missions, displaying personal courage leading to the defeat of units of the enemy fleet, for destroying enemy shore facilities, for the disruption of enemy communications.

It may also be awarded to military units that participated in successful naval operations and to foreign citizens, soldiers of allied forces from among the officers who took part alongside soldiers of the Russian Federation in organizing and conducting successful joint operations of allied troops (forces).

The Order of Nakhimov is worn on the left side of the chest and when in the presence of other Orders and medals of the Russian Federation, is located immediately after the Order of Kutuzov.

== Description of the modern award ==
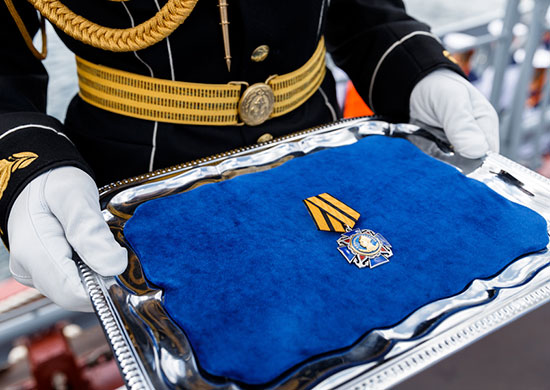
The cruiser «Moskva» («Moscow») was awarded the Order of Nakhimov. Sevastopol, 22 Jul 2016.

The badge of the Order Nakhimov is a 40 mm wide blue enamelled silver cross pattée with a narrow raised edge superimposed over a four pointed star, the ruby enamelled rays of which protrude between the arms of the cross and end in the shape of naval sea anchors. In the center of the obverse, a blue enamelled silver bordered medallion bearing the left profile bust of Admiral Nakhimov over laurel branches. Along the medallion's circumference over the image of the bust, the relief silver inscription “Admiral Nakhimov” (Russian: «Aдмирал Нахимов»). The medallion is surrounded by a silver chain.

The Order Nakhimov is suspended to a standard Russian pentagonal mount by a ring through the suspension loop. The mount is covered by an overlapping 24 mm wide orange silk moiré ribbon with 1 mm wide black edge stripes and a 4 mm wide central black stripe.

== See also ==
- Admiral Nakhimov
- Soviet Navy
- Russian Navy
- Great Patriotic War
- Awards and decorations of the Russian Federation
- Awards and decorations of the Soviet Union
