= Project 11780 =

Proposed Soviet amphibious assault ship

Class overview
- Name: Project 11780
- Operators: Soviet Navy
- Preceded by: Moskva class; Project 10200
- Succeeded by: Project 23900
- Planned: 2

General characteristics
- Type: Amphibious assault ship
- Displacement: 25,000 tons standard
- Length: 196 m (643 ft 1 in)
- Beam: 35 m (114 ft 10 in)
- Draught: 8 m (26 ft 3 in)
- Installed power: 180000 hp (132.4 MW)
- Propulsion: Steam Turbines
- Speed: 30 knots (56 km/h; 35 mph)
- Range: 8,000 miles (13,000 km) at 18 knots (33 km/h; 21 mph)
- Capacity: 4 x Ondatra-class landing craft; 2 x Tsaplya-class LCACs
- Armament: 1×2 130 mm AK-130 naval gun; 48 (6×8) 3K95 Kinzhal SAM missiles; 2-4 Kashtan CIWSes
- Aircraft carried: Up to 12 military helicopters, mix of: Kamov Ka-25; Kamov Ka-27; Kamov Ka-29

Project 11780 "Kherson" was an unrealized 1980s Soviet LHD program derived from the Kiev-class aircraft carrier design comparable to the US Tarawa-class amphibious assault ship. The ship would have been about 25,000 tons displacement, with steam turbine power plants and carried about 12 helicopters and four Ondatra-class landing craft or two Tsaplya-class LCACs.

== Development ==
The development of the Project 11780 began when Admiral of the Fleet of the USSR Sergey Gorshkov ordered the development of a fully-fledged universal landing ship. The design and purpose of the ship evolved throughout the development. Initially, the ship was intended solely for landing operations. Then the General Staff proposed turning the Project 11780 ships into universal aircraft-carrying ships by equipping them with a bow ski-jump ramp, allowing the deployment of helicopters to bolster the air support for the landing troops.

It was planned to build two ships: "Kherson" and "Kremenchuk". The pair would have a standard displacement of 25,000 tons, making it only could be built at the Chernomorsky Shipyard. At that time, the slipways of the Black Sea Shipyard were scheduled for the construction of Project 1143.5 aircraft carriers, which then triggered a "struggle for the slipway". The General Staff, placing great importance on the construction of the LHDs, proposed building them instead of the aircraft carriers.

== Ending ==
This proposal was opposed by the Navy Commander-in-Chief. Understanding that the construction of the LHDs, due to the lack of required shipbuilding capacity, would likely lead to the abandonment of Project 1143.5 aircraft carriers. And so a cunning trick was employed. By the Commander-in-Chief's order, an AK-130 artillery mount was placed on the bow, directly in front of the flight deck. The Naval Research Institute was tasked with providing a "scientific" justification for the presence of such armament and its placement. As a result, the General Staff lost interest in the project, and the construction was postponed.

At the request of the Minister of Defense, Marshal Dmitry Ustinov, the tasks of Project 11780 were expanded to include peacetime tracking of enemy submarines in the seas. Ultimately, all these changes led to the Project 11780 ships never being laid down.

== See also ==
- Tarawa class amphibious assault ship
- List of ships of the Soviet Navy
- List of ships of Russia by project number
