= Army commissar 2nd rank =

Army commissar 2nd rank

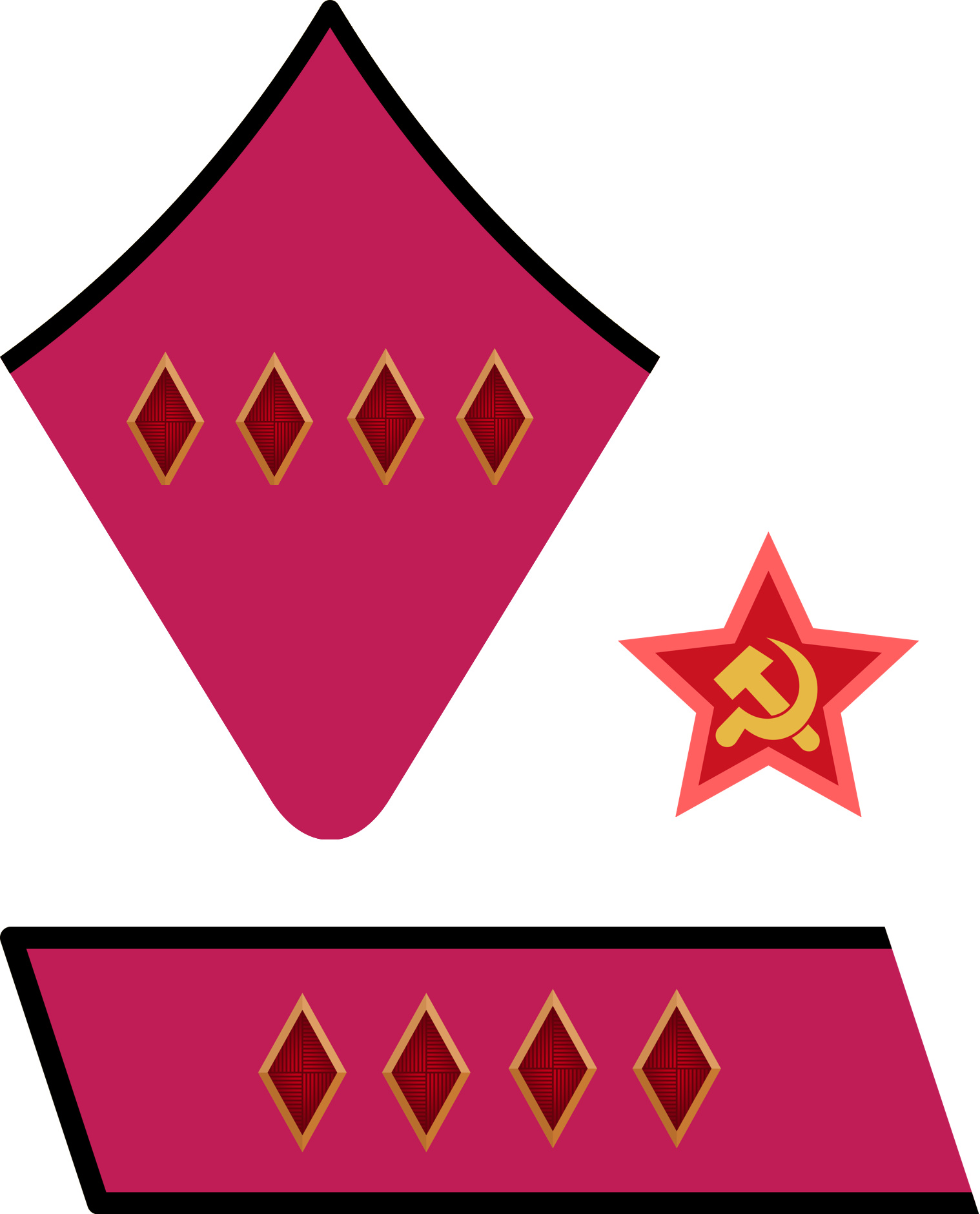
Army

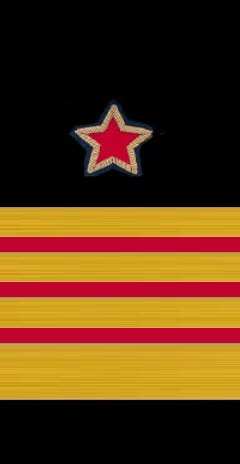
Navy, sleeve in signia

Rank insignia 1935-1942

Army commissar 2nd rank was a political rank in the Soviet Red Army, equivalent to the military rank of Komandarm 2nd rank.

== Appointment ==
=== 1935 ===
Appointment to Army commissar 2nd rank as to the disposal of the Central Executive Committee of the Soviet Union and the Council of People's Commissars (CPC) from November 20, 1935:

- Mikhail Amelin (1896-1937), arrested June 1937 and later executed
- Lazar Aronshtam (1896-1938), arrested May 1937 and later executed
- Anton Bulin (1894-1938) arrested December 1937 and later executed
- Hayk Ovsepyan (1891 - 1937) executed
- Pyotr Smirnov (1897-1939) promoted to Army Commissar of 1st rank December 20, 1937, arrested June 1938

=== 1937 ===
- Yan Karlovich Berzin (1889-1938) as to CPC disposal June 14, 1937; arrested May 1938 and later executed
- Lev Mekhlis (1889-1953) as to CPC disposal December 20, 1937; promoted to Army Commissar of 1st rank in 1939

== Sources ==
- Hill, Alexander (2017). "Preface - Military Ranks". The Red Army and the Second World War. Cambridge University Press. ISBN 9781316720516.
