= Mikhail Amelin =

Soviet political officer

Mikhail Petrovich Amelin
- Born: December 4, 1896; Russian Empire
- Died: September 8, 1937 (aged 40) Moscow, Soviet Union
- Allegiance: Soviet Union
- Branch: Soviet Red Army
- Rank: Army Commissar 2nd rank
- Conflicts: Russian Civil War

Mikhail Petrovich Amelin (Russian: Михаи́л Петро́вич Аме́лин; December 4, 1896 – September 8, 1937) was a Soviet political officer. He fought on the side of the Bolsheviks during the Russian Civil War. In 1933, he received the Order of the Red Banner. During the Great Purge, he was arrested on June 19, 1937, and later executed. He was rehabilitated on April 18, 1956.

== Biography ==
Amelin was born to a poor peasant family in Solomino village, Kursk Governorate. At the age of 13, he went to his older brother in the Donbas, where he worked as a carpenter and a lumberman at a mine.

He served in the Russian Imperial Army from 1915 on. He was sent to the Ryazan 69th Infantry Regiment, where he graduated from the training team and, with the rank of non-commissioned officer, was enlisted in the regimental sapper team., fighting on the North-Western Front.

Amelin led anti-war propaganda in the regiment, then fled because of the threat of arrest, He was arrested and sentenced to a penal company. He also fled from there, reaching the city of Kyshtym in the Urals. After the February Revolution he returned to the army in May 1917 and was elected a company commander. During the October Revolution he was the head of the sapper detachment. In November 1917 he joined the Bolsheviks ("RSDLP(b)").

He joined the Red Army in early 1918, serving in the Kursk Revolutionary Regiment. In January 1919 he graduated from the three-month training course for military commissars. He was an emergency commissioner for the supply of troops of the Yekaterinoslav sector, deputy chairman of the Odessa military tribunal, authorized by the Revolutionary Military Council of the 3rd Ukrainian Army, commissar of the 30th rifle regiment, and head of the Bobrinsky combat sector. From July 1920, as part of a combined cadet division, he fought against the army of General Wrangel, serving as a detachment commissar, a company political instructor, and a battalion commissar.

He graduated from the Higher Military Pedagogical School in Moscow in 1923. From 1930 to 1934 he was a member of the Central Control Commission of the Communist Party (Bolsheviks) of Ukraine ("CP(b)U"). In January 1931, he was appointed to the post of deputy chief, and in April 1934, to the post of head of the Political Directorate of the Ukrainian Military District. At the same time, from 1934 he was a member of the Military Council under the People's Commissar of Defense of the USSR, from 1934 - a member of the Central Committee of the CP (b) of Ukraine, in January - June 1934 - a candidate member, from June 1934 - a member of the Organizing Bureau of the Central Committee of the CP (b) ) of Ukraine, and since May 1937 - a member of the Military Council of the Kiev Military District.

On June 19, 1937, he was arrested in connection with the testimony of Ilya Shelekhes, deputy chairman of the Council of People's Commissars of the Ukrainian SSR. During the investigation, Amelin pleaded guilty and named 63 people as "participants in the conspiracy". On September 8, 1937, according to the verdict of the visiting session of the USSR All-Union Military Commission in Kyiv, he was sentenced to death; he was shot the next evening. The burial place is a special object of the NKVD of the Ukrainian SSR "Bykivnya". On April 18, 1956, he was posthumously rehabilitated by the VKVS of the USSR.

Amelin's wife Stefania Boleslavovna (1904 -?) was sentenced by a special meeting of the NKVD of the USSR on November 2, 1937, to eight years in the camps. She was rehabilitated on February 17, 1956.
