= Kamov Ka-65 =

Russian naval helicopter project

Ka-65

General information
- National origin: Russia

History
- First flight: 2025 (expected)

Kamov Ka-65 Minoga (Russian: "Минога"; Lamprey) is a project for a new helicopter to replace Ka-27 in the Russian Navy by Kamov.

== Design and development ==
The Helicopter is being developed as part of Minoga program ordered on 28 November 2014 by the Russian Defence Ministry.

In June 2019 a photo of what appears to be a prototype of the Minoga has appeared online.

At the Army-2020 forum Russian Helicopters holding have signed a contract with the Russian Defence Ministry for the first stage of R&D work on the advanced Minoga helicopter. The head of the company, Andrey Boginskiy has said that at the first stage of the R&D, it is planned to create a Testbed, perform ground testing of systems, assemblies, and structural elements, and its completion is scheduled for 2023.

It is planned that the Minoga will replace the Ka-27 helicopters in all areas of their application: in anti-submarine, search and rescue, assault and transport variants, as well as in airborne early warning version.

As of 2020, flight tests of the helicopter were scheduled to begin in 2025 or 2026.
