= Army Commissar of 1st rank =

Army commissar 1st rank

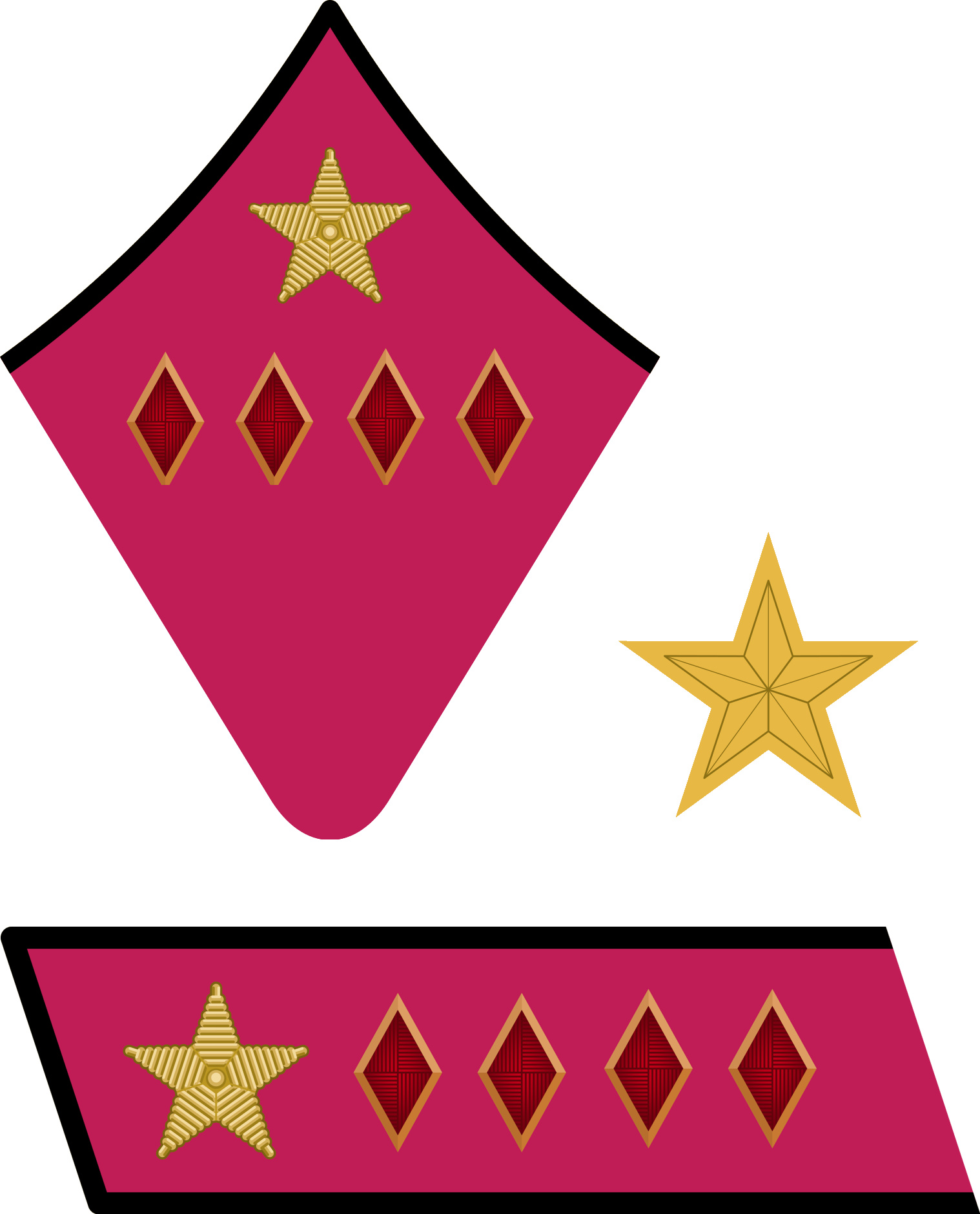
Army

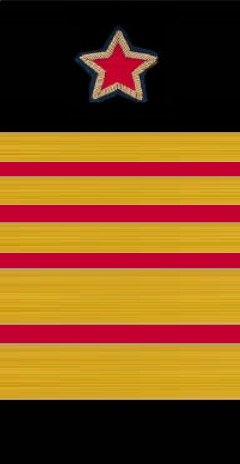
Navy, sleeve in signia

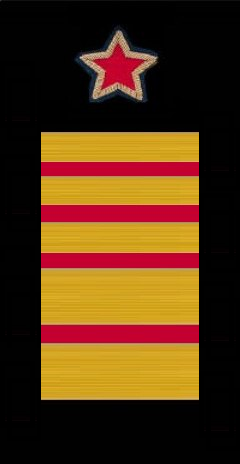
Navy, sleeve in signia

Rank insignia 1935-1942

Army commissar 1st rank (Russian: армейский комиссар 1-го ранга), was a political rank in the Soviet Red Army, equivalent to the military rank of Komandarm 1st rank, and comparable to NATO OF-9.

== Appointment ==
=== 1935 ===
Appointment to Army Comissar 1st rank as to the disposal of the Central Executive Committee of the Soviet Union and the Council of People's Commissars (CPC) from November 20, 1935:

- Yan Gamarnik (1894–1937), committed suicide to avoid arrest

=== 1937 ===
- Pyotr Smirnov (1897–1939), as to CPC disposal December 20, 1937; arrested June 1938 and later executed

=== 1939 ===
- Lev Mekhlis (1889–1953), as to CPC disposal February 8, 1939
- Efim Shchadenko (1885–1951)

=== 1941 ===
Alexander Zaporozhets (1899–1959)
