= Ivan Rogov-class amphibious assault ship =

Proposed Russian navy ship

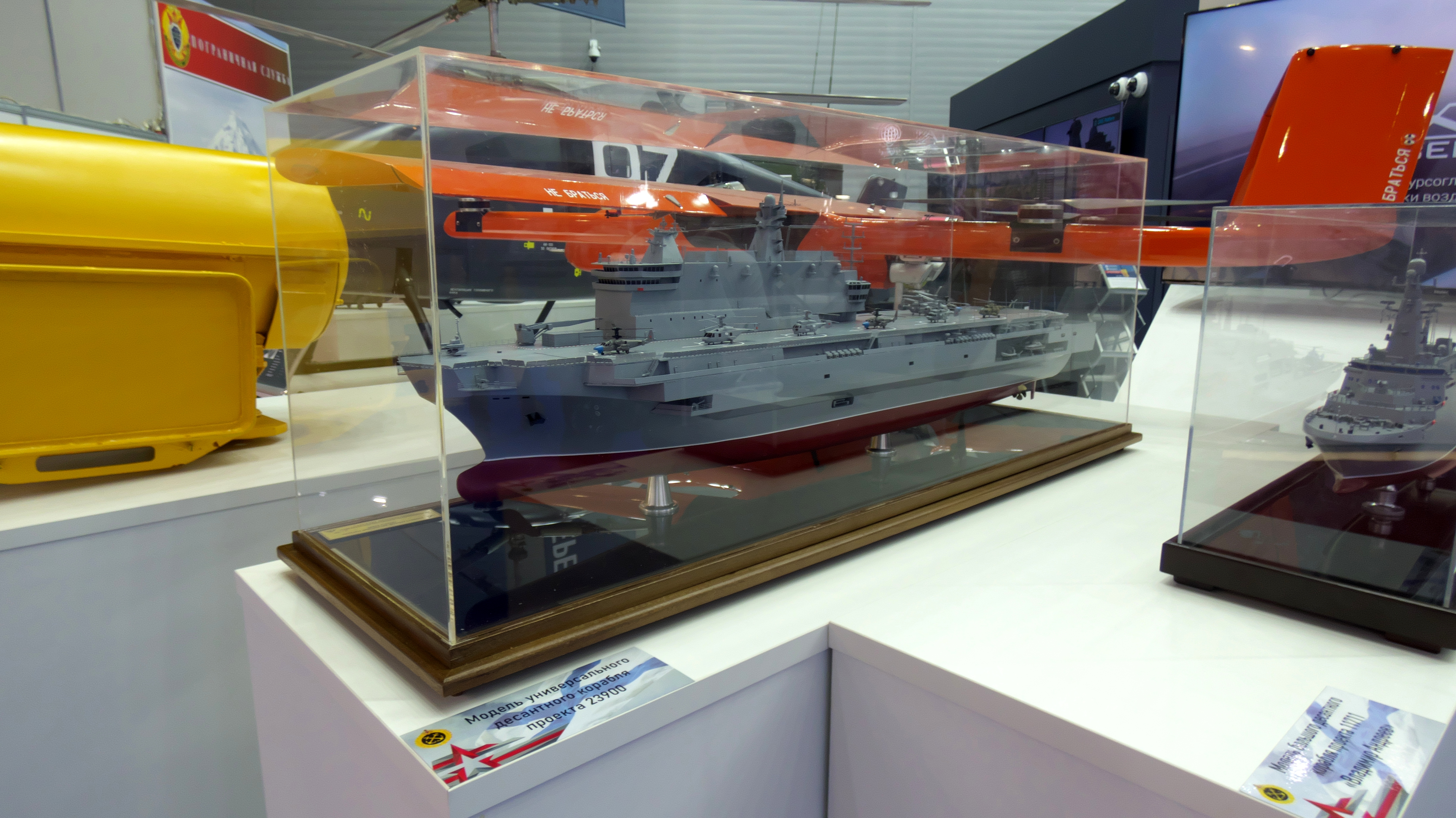
- Official model of the Project 23900.

Class overview
- Builders: Zaliv shipyard, Kerch
- Operators: Russian Navy
- Preceded by: Project 10200; Project 11780
- Cost: RUB 50 billion ($688 Million)
- Built: 2020–present
- Planned: 2
- Building: 2

General characteristics
- Type: Amphibious assault ship
- Displacement: 40,000 tons
- Length: 220 m (721 ft 9 in)
- Beam: 38 m (124 ft 8 in)
- Draught: 7.5 m (24 ft 7 in)
- Propulsion: 2 × 16D49 turbo diesels (5 MW each), 2 × M90FR gas turbines (21 MW each)
- Speed: 22 knots (41 km/h; 25 mph)
- Range: 6,000 mi (5,200 nmi; 9,700 km)
- Endurance: 60 days
- Capacity: 75 armored fighting vehicles; 4 landing or assault boats of the: Serna class; Dyugon class; 2 Tsaplya class
- Troops: up to 900 marines
- Complement: 320 crew
- Armament: 1 x 100 mm A190 naval gun; 3 x Kashtan CIWS; 2 x Pantsir-M
- Aircraft carried: Up to 30 military helicopters and 4 drones, mix of: Kamov Ka-27; Kamov Ka-29; Kamov Ka-31; Kamov Ka-52K; Kamov Ka-65; Sukhoi S-70 Okhotnik-B
- Aviation facilities: Hangar deck

The Ivan Rogov (also known as the Project 23900) is the newest class of Russian amphibious assault ships intended as a replacement for the French Mistral class, two of which were ordered by Russia in 2011, but that France refused to deliver in September 2014 due to the Russo-Ukrainian War. A contract was signed on 22 May 2020 for the construction of two Project 23900 ships with a displacement of 40,000 tons. The construction is led by JSC Zelenodolsk Design Bureau, which is a part of JSC Ak Bars Shipbuilding Corporation.

Previously, the Lavina (Russian: Лавина, lit. 'Avalanche'), and Priboy (Russian: Прибой, lit. 'Surf') designs were proposed by the Nevskoe Design Bureau and Krylov State Research Center as the replacement for Mistrals.

Project 23900 is also a successor class to the unrealized Soviet Project 11780 program.

== History ==
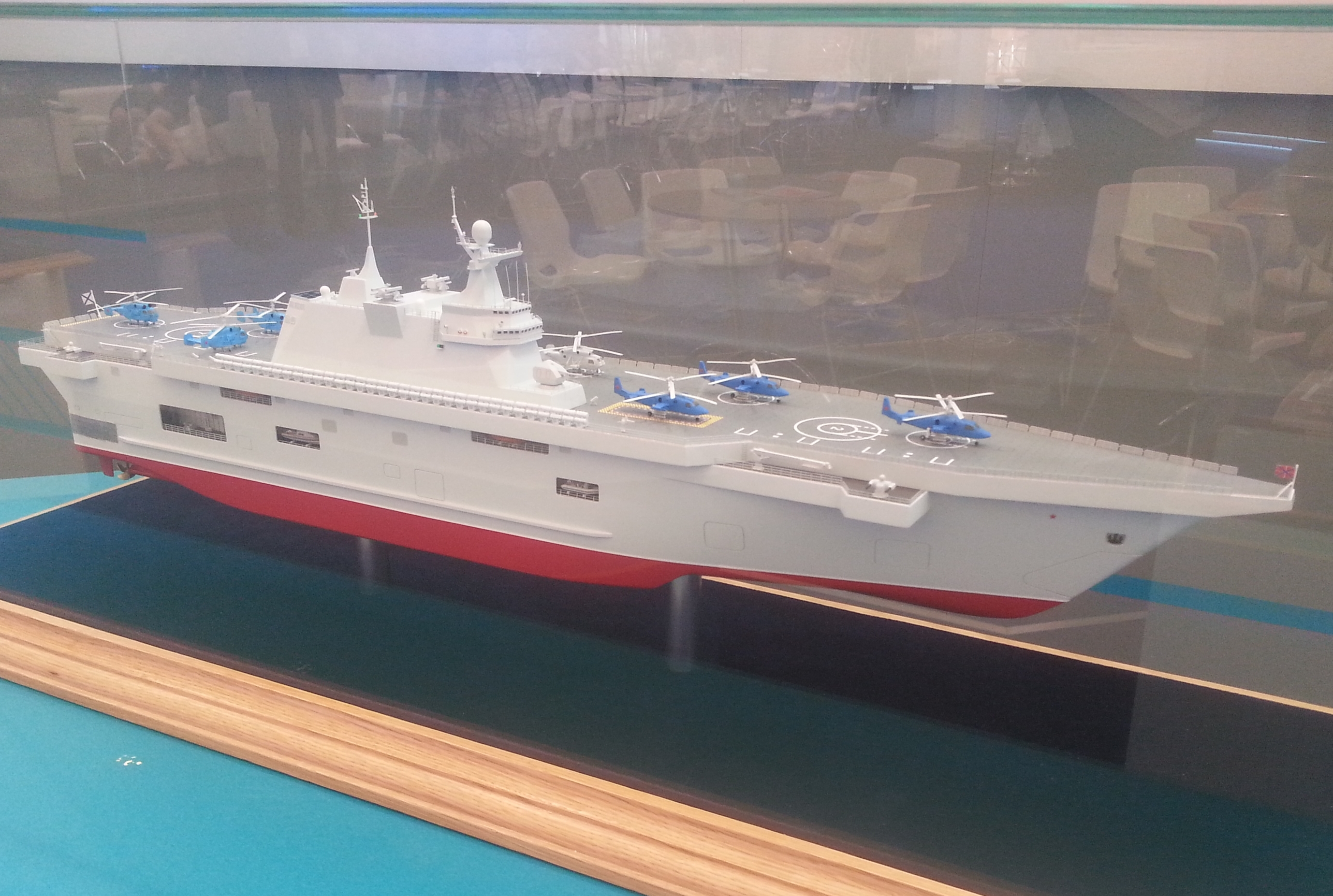
Original "Priboy" design model

Initially, the "Priboy" and "Lavina" helicopter carrier designs were first revealed in June 2015 during the "ARMY-2015" military-technical forum, as a replacement for the two undelivered Mistral-class vessels ordered by Russia in 2011 under a $1.3 billion contract. However, due to the international sanctions against Russia, the French refused to proceed with the delivery and the deal was suspended in 2015. France subsequently returned to Russia the deposit paid for the construction of the two vessels. Both vessels were later sold to the Egyptian Navy.

On 25 May 2017, Russian Deputy Defence Minister Yury Borisov stated that the construction cycle of new Russian helicopter carrier would last at least four years and the first ship was projected to be completed by 2022.

In June 2017, Vice President of the United Shipbuilding Corporation Igor Ponomarev said the "Priboy" helicopter carriers were implemented in Russia's New State Armament Programme for 2018–2025 and that the construction of the ships could be carried either by Severnaya Verf, Baltic Shipyard or Sevmash.

In July 2017, a member of the Russia's State Duma Dmitry Belik announced, the lead ship of the class would be named Sevastopol, after the city of Sevastopol. The cost for the ship is to be about RUB40 billion ($675 million), and its construction would begin after approval of the New State Armament Programme for 2018–2025.

On 11 September 2019, it was reported that the first and second vessel of the class would be laid down in May 2020 at Zaliv Shipyard, Crimea.

On 22 May 2020, according to a TASS news agency report, the Russian Defence Ministry had signed a RUB100 billion deal for the construction of two universal landing ships, with construction to take place at the Zaliv Shipyard in Crimea. As of 2020, the two vessels had been projected to be delivered to the Russian Navy in 2026 and 2027, respectively.

On 20 July 2020, during the keel laying ceremony, the names of the first two ships were officially revealed. The ships were named Ivan Rogov and Mitrofan Moskalenko, the same as two already decommissioned Ivan Rogov-class vessels.

On 28 February 2021, it was reported that the shipbuilders had begun to build the hulls of the two future amphibious assault ships. It was also reported that construction was going on schedule, that the displacement of each of them would be 40,000 tons, and that the ships would have the capacity of up to four Sukhoi S-70 Okhotnik-B drones, to both perform strike missions and to perform target designation for the hypersonic Zircon missiles launched from other ships.

On 11 October 2021, it was reported that Mitrofan Moskalenko would become the flagship of the Black Sea Fleet. Infrastructure facilities initially intended for the second Mistral-class vessel are being prepared in Sevastopol, scheduled to be ready by the time the ship is commissioned.

On 20 June 2024, it was reported that Ivan Rogov will be ready for factory and sea trials by the end of 2027, and should be delivered to the Russian Navy in Q3 2028.

On 21 March 2026, satellite photos revealed the Ivan Rogov with a nearly completed superstructure and most of the ship completed.

== Design ==
"Lavina" was the first designation for the class, revealed at the «ARMY-2015» military-technical forum, and stands for the heavier variant designed by Krylov with a displacement of about 24,000 tons. "Priboy" used to refer to the lighter variant designed by Nevskoe, and displacing about 14,000 tons.

Based on images shown to Vladimir Putin at a January 2020 exposition devoted to the future for the Russian Navy, the two Project 23900 ships ordered for the Russian Navy appear to be a design derivative from the French Mistral class, having similar architecture and dimensions. The Project 23900 will be even larger and displace about 40,000 tons.

On 20 July 2020, at the official ceremony for the laying down of the Project 23900, a computer-generated image was showcased to represent the warship. Based on that image, the design of Project 23900 looks like a hybrid between the Lavina and the Mistral.

On 14 December 2021, it was reported that the Project 23900 ships will be able to carry strike and reconnaissance drones, which will greatly enhance the helicopter carriers' combat capabilities.

On 6 January 2022, it was reported that the amphibious assault ships will be armed with mine warfare unmanned surface vessels, which will detect, identify, and destroy sea mines. This will allow the vessels to operate independent from the support of minesweepers, allowing them to independently fulfill missions in blue waters.

== Export ==
Krylov has also proposed an export version of the Priboy design, dubbed "Priboy-E".

== Ships ==
Italics indicate estimates

Name	Builder	Laid down	Launched	Commissioned	Fleet	Status
Ivan Rogov	Zaliv Shipyard	20 July 2020			Pacific Fleet	Under construction
Mitrofan Moskalenko	Zaliv Shipyard	20 July 2020			Black Sea	Under construction

== See also ==
- Future of the Russian Navy
- List of aircraft carriers in service

Equivalent amphibious warfare ships of the same era

- America class
- Type 075
- Trieste class
- Canberra class
- Juan Carlos I class
- Anadolu class
