= Zaliv Shipbuilding Yard =

Shipyard located in Kerch, Crimea

Coordinates: 45°15′50.0″N 36°24′44.7″E

Zaliv

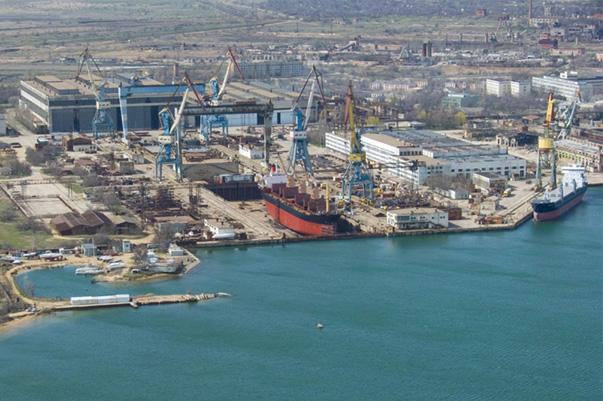
- Native name: Залив
- Industry: shipbuilding
- Founded: 1938
- Headquarters: Kerch, Crimea
- Owner: OOO Vesta (60%); OOO Enkor (40%)
- Website: kerchbutoma.ru

The Zaliv Shipbuilding Yard (Russian: Судостроительный завод «Залив», Ukrainian: Суднобудівний завод «Залив») is located in Kerch, Crimea and specializes in the construction of tankers and container carriers, and the repair of ships of different types and tonnage.

The shipyard was also known as Kamysh-Burun Zavod, and Soviet Shipyard No. 532 named after Butoma Boris Evstaf'evich.

== History ==
The joint stock company Zaliv Shipyard was founded in 1938. It is situated on the shore of the Kerch Strait, between two seas, the Black Sea and the Sea of Azov. From 1945 to 1980, the yard built about 600 ships, including sea trawlers, small torpedo boats, fishing boats and barges. Since the 1960s, it has built tankers.

The shipyard was formerly affiliated with the KrAZ Holding Company (Kremenchuk). As of April 2017, the company is owned by OOO Vesta (60%) and OOO Enkor (40%). The facilities were targeted by a missile attack on November 4, 2023, with one ship in dock being allegedly damaged.

== Facilities and services ==
The shipyard occupies an area of 350 acres (0.55 sq mi). It has a graving dock that is 360 meters long and 60 meters wide. It can accommodate ships with a draught of 13 meters. Two gantry cranes, each with a 200-tons lifting capacity, are part of this dock.

== Specialization ==
- Type "Krym" Project 1511 tanker was built 1974-1980, created in 1973 by "Baltsudnoproekt"
- Project 12990 Pobeda tanker
- Panamax was built 1980-1996
- Nuclear-powered icebreaking cargo ship Sevmorput in the 1980s
- Series of stationary oil platform
- Several military frigates
- Krivak I class (along with Yantar and Severnaya Verf)
- Krivak III class (exclusively at Zaliv).

=== Building ===
- Project 22800 corvette Amur
- Project 22160 corvettes / patrol boats
- Project 23900 amphibious assault ships
- Project 23560 destroyers / cruisers / ASWs (planned)
- Tankers, Oceanographic, Coast Guard MVD and other vessels
- Many of the metal hardware beam barges for the Crimean Bridge
- Passenger hydrofoil boats (hulls)

Name	Class and type	Plant №	Laid	Launched
Simferopol	Pr. A145 passenger ship (SPM-150)	701	5 September 2014	
Kerch	Pr. A145 passenger ship (SPM-150)	702	5 September 2014	
	Pr. A145 passenger ship (SPM-150)	703		
	Pr. 23131 marine tanker	301	26 December 2014	
	Pr. 23131 marine tanker	302	26 December 2014	
Volga	Pr. 15310 cable ship	nd	6 January 2015	
Vyatka	Pr. 15310 cable ship	nd	6 January 2015	
	Pr. A163 search and rescue ship Spasatel Ilin	112	28 July 2015	21 February 2019
	Pr. A163 search and rescue ship	113	9 December 2015	
Amur	Pr. 22800 small missile ship	803 (? nd)	30 July 2017	26 December 2022
	Pr. 19910 small hydrographic ship	801	26 July 2016	
	Pr. 19910 small hydrographic ship	802	18 November 2016	
Amur	Pr. 19910 small hydrographic ship	803	30 July 2016	
	Pr. 19910 small hydrographic ship	804	Early 2017	
	Pr. 19910 small hydrographic ship	805	Early 2017	
Ivan Rogov	Pr. 23900 landing helicopter dock		20 July 2020	
Mitrofan Moskalenko	Pr. 23900 landing helicopter dock		20 July 2020	
	Pr. 23560 destroyer/cruiser/ASW		(planned)	

== Notable vessels ==
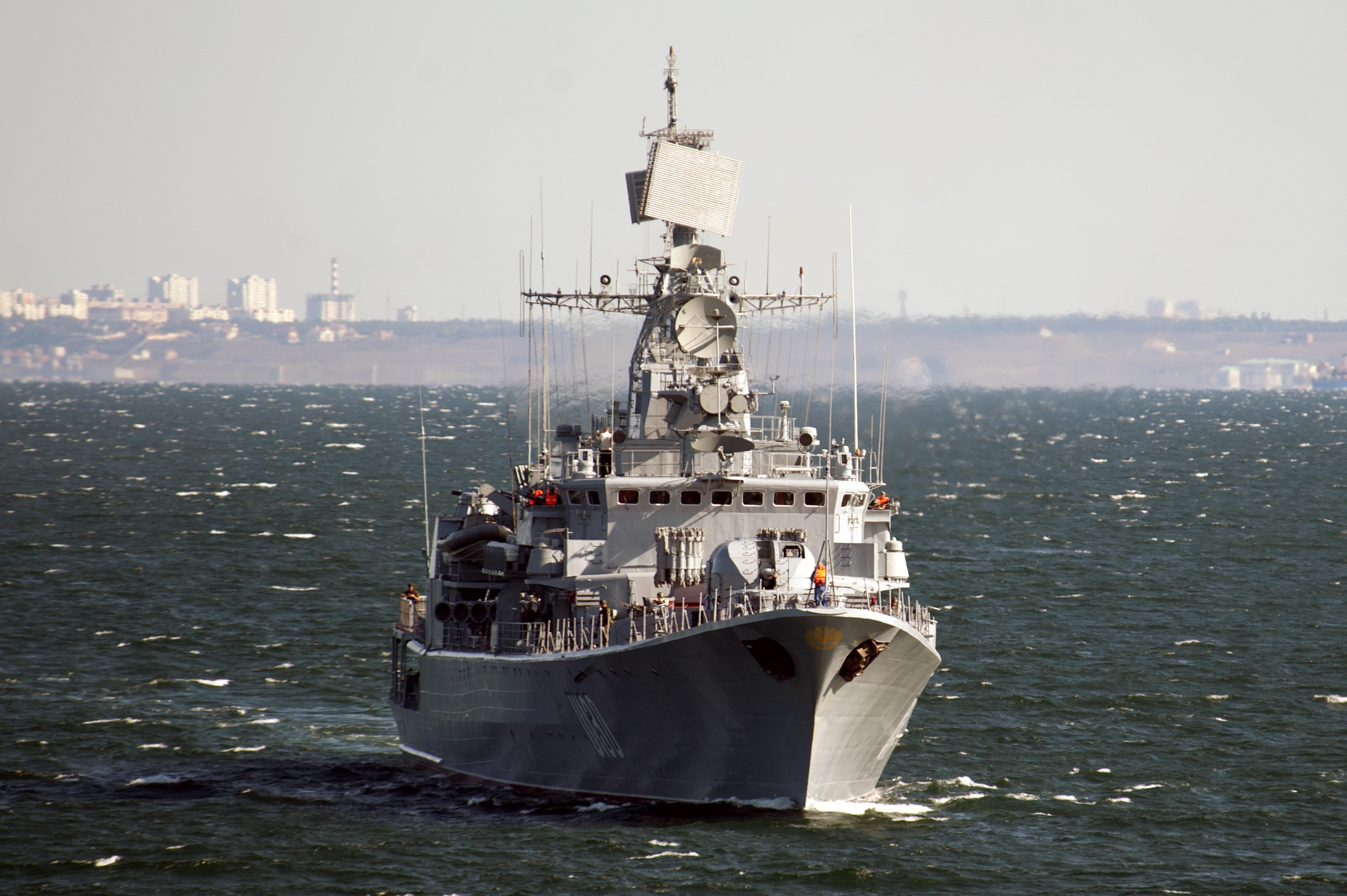
The Krivak class frigate Hetman Sahaydachniy, former flagship of the Ukrainian navy.

Name	Class and type	Plant №	Laid	Launched
Bezzavetnyy	Pr. 1135 frigate		1973	1977
Pobeda	Pr. 12990 marine tanker		1981	1988
Sevmorput	Nuclear-powered LASH carrier		1982	1988
Hetman Sahaydachniy (U130)	Pr. 11351 frigate		1991	1992

== See also ==
- List of ships of Russia by project number
- List of Soviet and Russian submarine classes
