= Ivan Rogov-class landing ship =

Class of landing ship built for the Soviet Navy

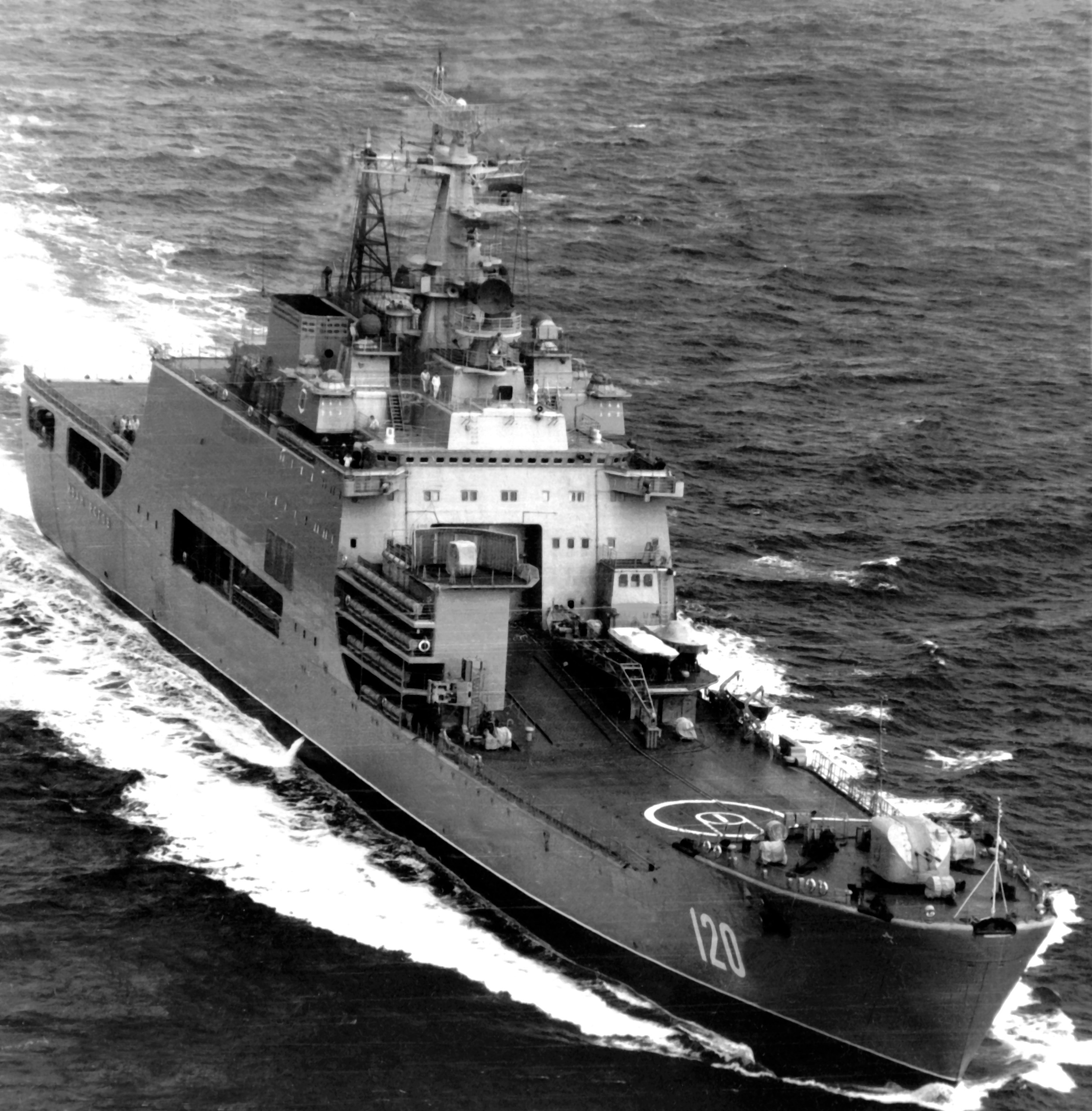
- Ivan Rogov in 1982.

Class overview
- Name: Ivan Rogov class
- Builders: Yantar Shipyard, Kaliningrad
- Operators: Soviet Navy; Russian Navy
- Succeeded by: Ivan Gren class
- Built: 1973–1990
- In service: 1978–2006
- Completed: 3
- Retired: 3
- Preserved: 0

General characteristics
- Type: Landing ship
- Displacement: 11,580 tons standard; 14,060 tons full
- Length: 157 m (515 ft)
- Beam: 23.8 m (78 ft)
- Draught: 6.7 m (22 ft)
- Propulsion: 2 shafts, 2 gas turbines, 2 × 18,000 hp (13,000 kW)
- Speed: 19 knots (35 km/h)
- Range: 7,500 nmi (13,890 km) at 14 knots (26 km/h)
- Capacity: 2,500 tons of cargo
- Complement: 239
- Armament: Osa-M surface-to-air missile system (1 × 2 launchers, 20 missiles); 76 mm AK-726 multipurpose gun (1 × 2 with 1000 rounds); 30 mm AK-630 air defence gun (4 × 6-barreled mounts with 16,000 cartridges); Grad-m 122 mm rocket launcher (1 with 320 rockets)
- Aircraft carried: 4 × Kamov Ka-27 or Ka-29 helicopters

The Ivan Rogov class, Soviet designation Project 1174 Nosorog (Rhino), is a class of landing ships (large landing ship in Soviet classification) built in the Soviet Union. The ships were built as a part of expansion of the Soviet Navy's amphibious warfare capabilities in the 1970s.

Project 1174 has both bow ramp and well deck; it may operate as either a LST or as a LPD. A typical load is one battalion of 520 marines and 25 tanks. Up to 53 tanks or 80 armoured personnel carriers may be carried if the well deck is used for ground vehicle parking. In total, 2,500 tons of cargo may be carried.

== History ==
Mitrofan Moskalenko was decommissioned after the Russian Ministry of Defence determined modernization would be as costly as buying a new ship.

Both Aleksandr Nikolayev and Mitrofan Moskalenko were put to the auction for scrapping in 2014. In 2015, with the decision of the French government to not deliver two ordered Mistral-class amphibious assault ships for the Russian Navy, it was considered to temporarily replace the Mistrals with the last two Project 1174 ships that are still in reserve.

On May 27, 2019, the Mitrofan Moskalenko caught fire at the shipyard in the port of Severomorsk.

Mitrofan Moskalenko was towed from Severomorsk to Murmansk for scrapping in May 2019.

Aleksandr Nikolayeev is still kept preserved as of Autumn 2019, despite scrapping tender being been published in April 2016.

== Electronics and sensors ==
- E-Band Surveillance Radar
- Two I-Band Navigation Radars
- G-Band Fire Control Radar (for 76mm Gun)
- H/I-Band Fire Control Radar (for 30mm Guns)
- F/H/I-Band Fire Control Radar (for Osa-M Missile System)
- 17 channel radio suite
- Optronic Fire Control System
- Electronic Warfare System with Electronic Support Measures (ESM)

== Ships ==
Name	Builders	Laid down	Launched	Commissioned	Status
Ivan Rogov	Yantar Shipyard, Kaliningrad	September 1973	31 May 1977	15 June 1978	Decommissioned in 1996
Aleksandr Nikolayev	Yantar Shipyard, Kaliningrad	March 1976	1982	30 December 1982	Decommissioned on 18 December 2006
Mitrofan Moskalenko	Yantar Shipyard, Kaliningrad	May 1984	1988	23 September 1990	Decommissioned on 18 December 2006

== See also ==
- List of ships of the Soviet Navy
- List of ships of Russia by project number

Equivalent landing ships of the same era

- Whidbey Island class
