= Degaussing =

Process of decreasing or eliminating a remnant magnetic field

Degaussing, or deperming, is the process of decreasing or eliminating a remnant magnetic field. It is named after the gauss, a unit of magnetism, which in turn was named after Carl Friedrich Gauss. Due to magnetic hysteresis, it is generally not possible to reduce a magnetic field completely to zero, so degaussing typically induces a very small "known" field referred to as bias. Degaussing was originally applied to reduce ships' magnetic signatures during World War II. Degaussing is also used to reduce magnetic fields in tape recorders and cathode-ray tube displays, and to destroy data held on magnetic storage.

== Ships' hulls ==
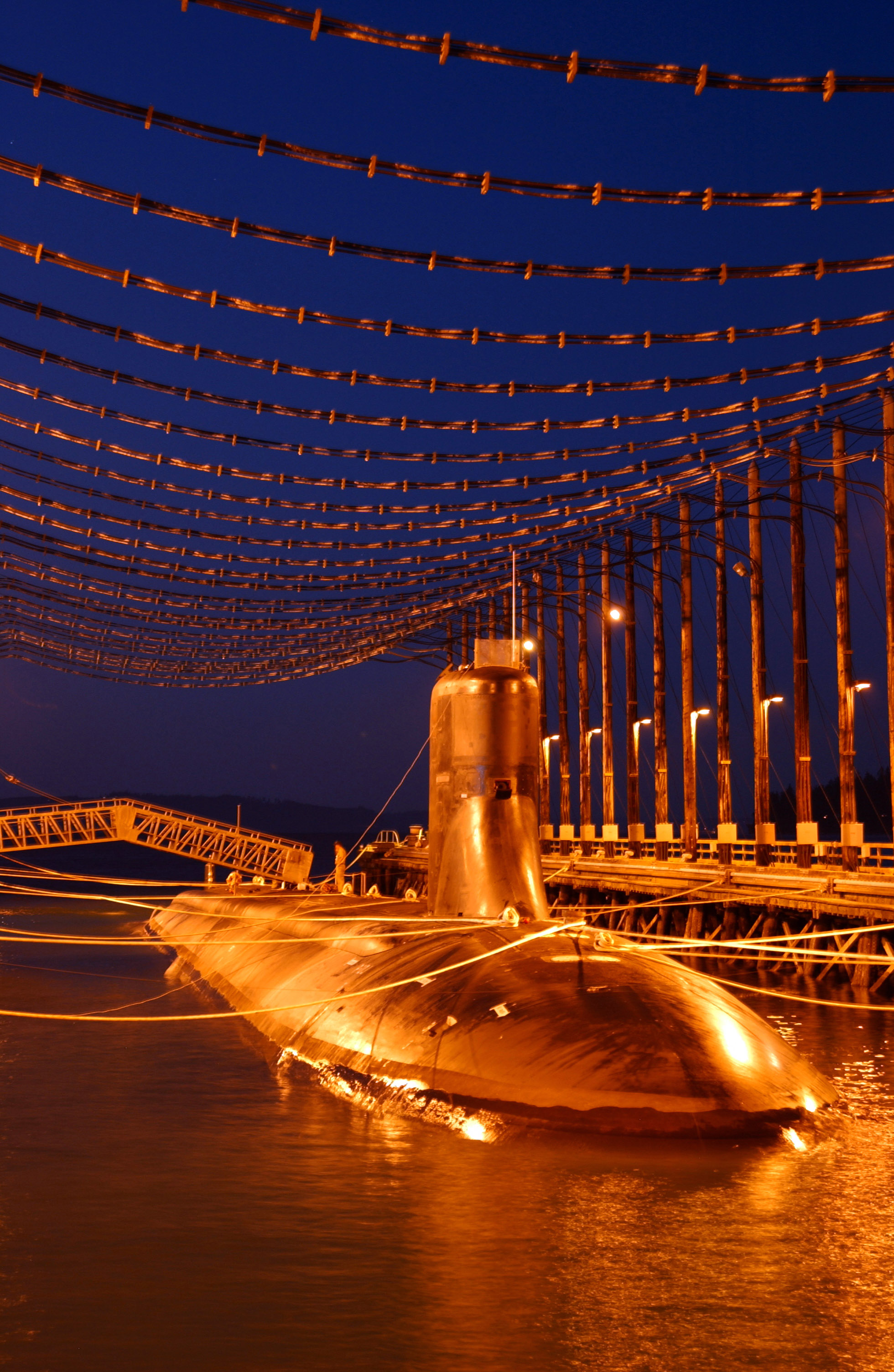
USS Jimmy Carter in the magnetic silencing facility at Naval Base Kitsap for her first deperming treatment

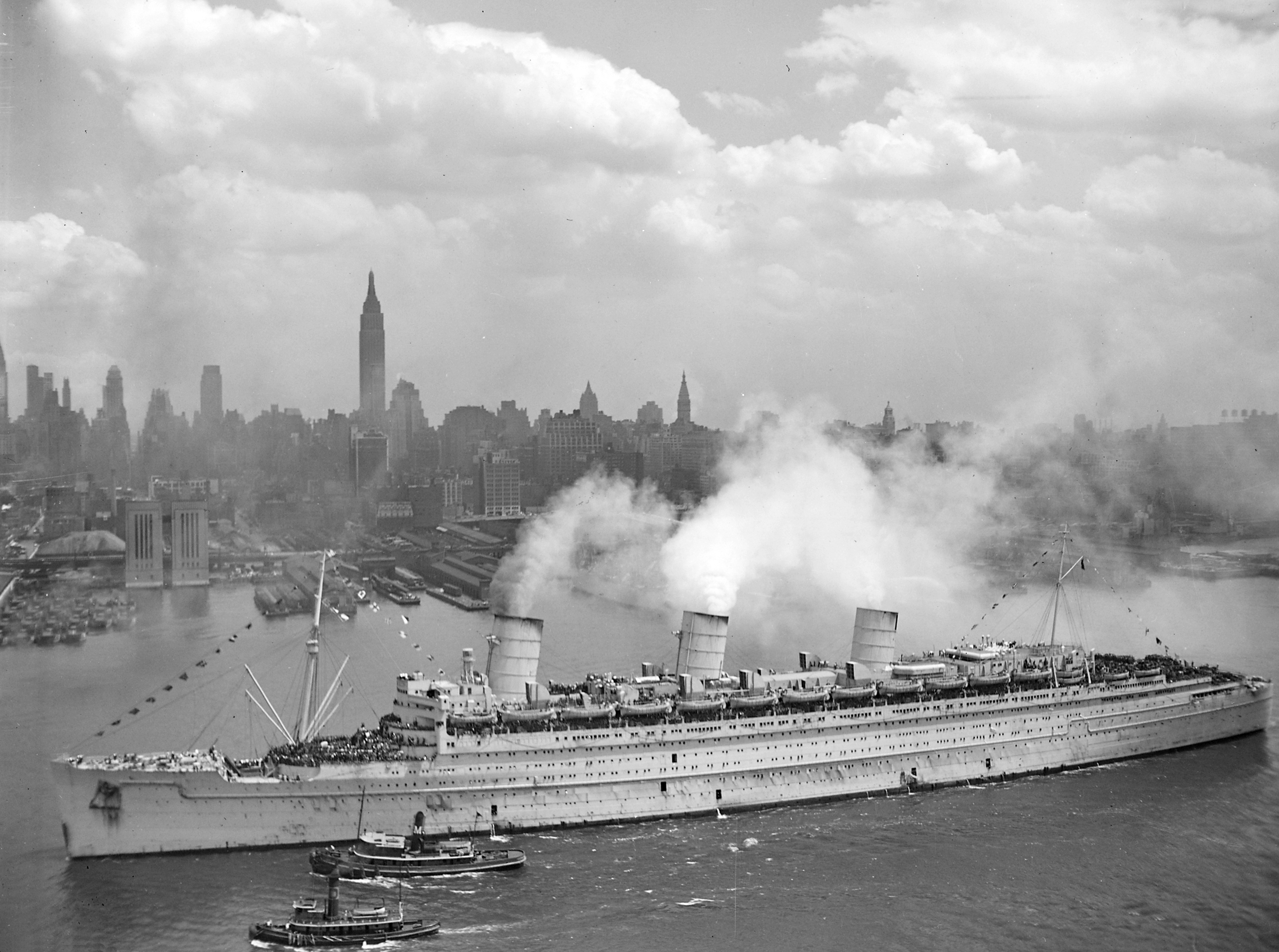
RMS Queen Mary arriving in New York Harbor, 20 June 1945, with thousands of U.S. soldiers – note the prominent degaussing coil running around the hull

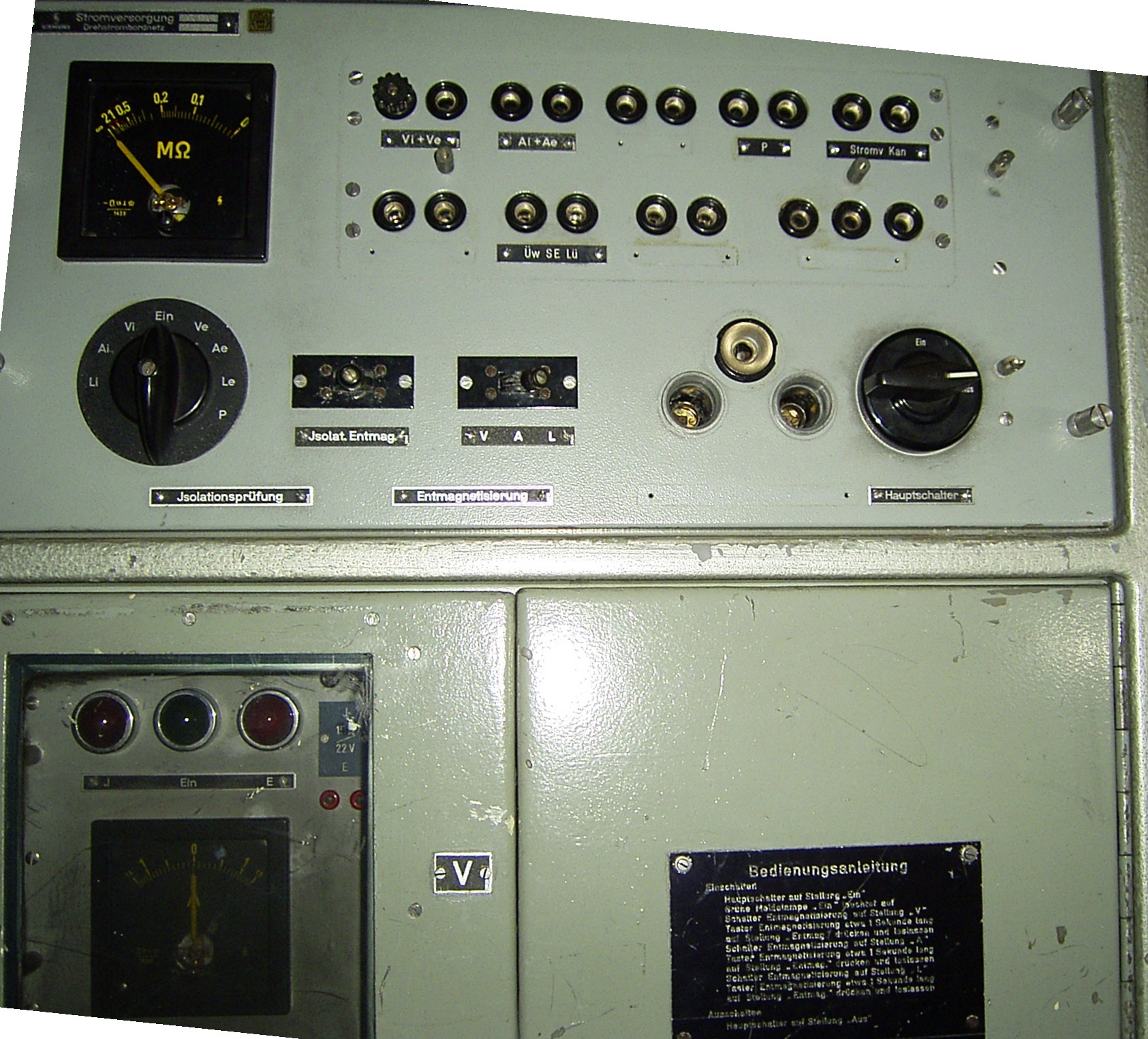
Control panel of the MES-device ("Magnetischer Eigenschutz" German: magnetic self-protection) in a German Type 205 submarine

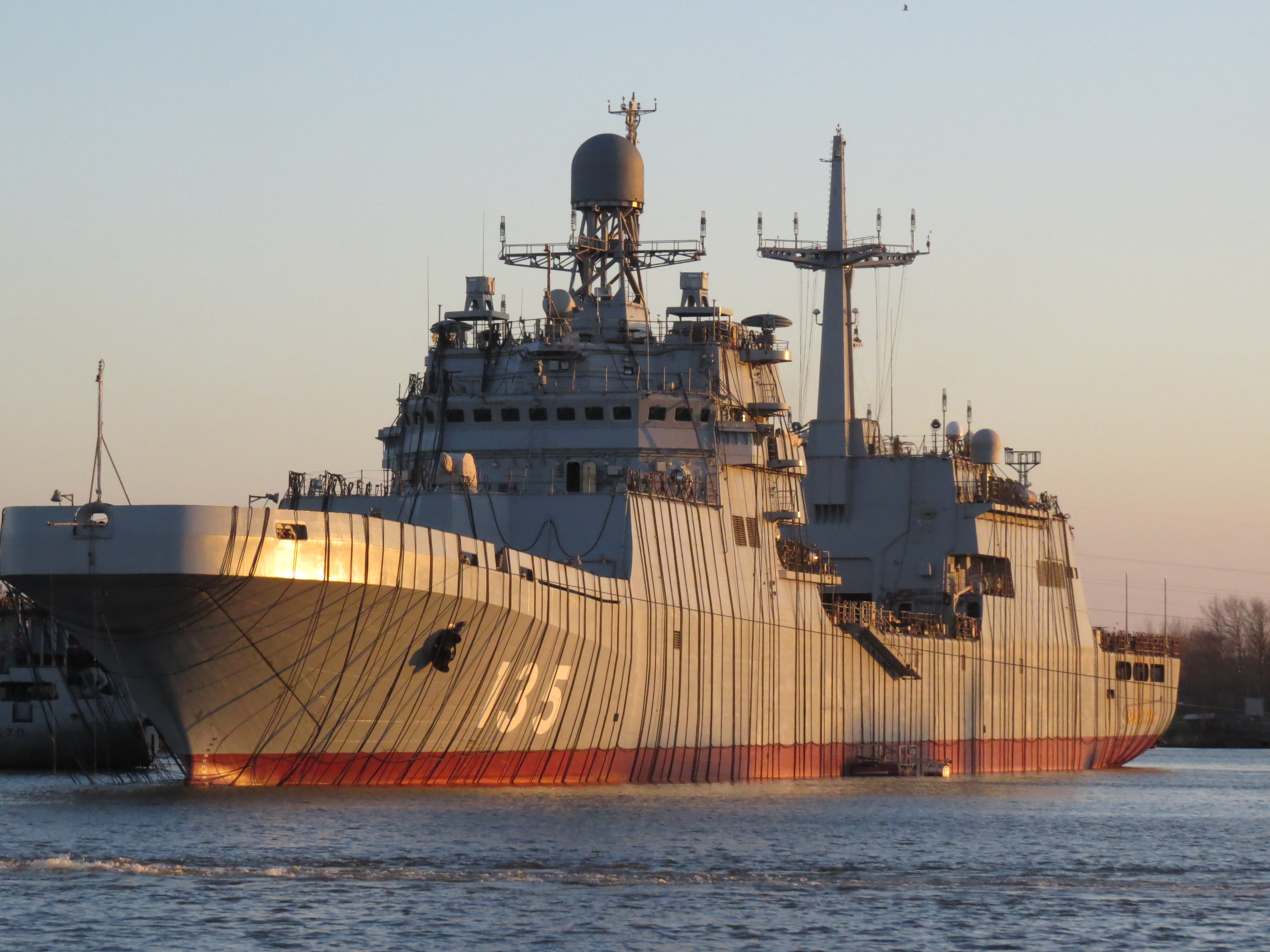
Close-wrap deperming of the Ivan Gren-class landing ship Ivan Gren, 2016. The cables are floated into position before wrapping around the vessel.

The term was first used by then-Commander Charles F. Goodeve, Royal Canadian Naval Volunteer Reserve, during World War II while trying to counter the German magnetic naval mines that were wreaking havoc on the British fleet.

The mines detected the increase in the magnetic field when the steel in a ship concentrated the Earth's magnetic field over it. Admiralty scientists, including Goodeve, developed a number of systems to induce a small "N-pole up" field into the ship to offset this effect, meaning that the net field was the same as the background. Since the Germans used the gauss as the unit of the strength of the magnetic field in their mines' triggers (not yet a standard measure), Goodeve referred to the various processes to counter the mines as degaussing. The term became a common word.

The original method of degaussing was to install electromagnetic coils into the ships, known as coiling. In addition to being able to bias the ship continually, coiling also allowed the bias field to be reversed in the southern hemisphere, where the mines were set to detect "N-pole down" fields. British ships, notably cruisers and battleships, were well protected by about 1943.

Installing such special equipment was, however, far too expensive and difficult to service all ships that would need it, so the navy developed an alternative called wiping, which Goodeve also devised. In this procedure, a large electrical cable with a pulse of about 2000 amperes flowing through it was dragged upwards on the side of the ship, starting at the waterline. For submarines, the current came from the vessels' own propulsion batteries. This induced the proper field into the ship in the form of a slight bias. It was originally thought that the pounding of the sea and the ship's engines would slowly randomize this field, but in testing, this was found not to be a real problem. A more serious problem was later realized: as a ship travels through Earth's magnetic field, it will slowly pick up that field, counteracting the effects of the degaussing. From then on captains were instructed to change direction as often as possible to avoid this problem. Nevertheless, the bias did wear off eventually, and ships had to be degaussed on a schedule.

Smaller ships continued to use wiping through the war. To aid the Dunkirk evacuation, the British wiped 400 ships in four days.

During World War II, the United States Navy commissioned a specialized class of degaussing ships that were capable of performing this function. One of them, USS Deperm (ADG-10), was named after the procedure.

After the war, the capabilities of the magnetic fuzes were greatly improved, by detecting not the field itself, but changes in it. This meant a degaussed ship with a magnetic hot spot would still set off the mine. Additionally, the precise orientation of the field was also measured, something a simple bias field could not remove, at least not for all points on the ship. A series of ever-increasingly complex coils were introduced to offset these fuze improvements, with modern systems including no fewer than three separate sets of coils to cancel the field in all axes.

=== Degaussing range ===
The effectiveness of ships' degaussing was monitored by shore-based degaussing ranges (or degaussing stations, magnetic ranges) installed beside shipping channels outside ports. The vessel under test passed at a steady speed over loops on the seabed that were monitored from buildings on the shore. The installation was used both to establish the magnetic characteristics of a hull to establish the correct value of degaussing equipment to be installed, or as a "spot check" on vessels to confirm that degaussing equipment was performing correctly. Some stations had active coils that provided magnetic treatment, offering to un-equipped ships some limited protection against future encounters with magnetic mines.

=== High-temperature superconductivity ===
The US Navy tested, in April 2009, a prototype of its High-Temperature Superconducting Degaussing Coil System, referred to as "HTS Degaussing". The system works by encircling the vessel with superconducting ceramic cables whose purpose is to neutralize the ship's magnetic signature, as in the legacy copper systems. The main advantage of the HTS Degaussing Coil system is greatly reduced weight (sometimes by as much as 80%) and increased efficiency.

A ferrous-metal-hulled ship or submarine, by its very nature, develops a magnetic signature as it travels, due to a magneto-mechanical interaction with Earth's magnetic field. It also picks up the magnetic orientation of the Earth's magnetic field where it is built. This signature can be exploited by magnetic mines or facilitate the detection of a submarine by ships or aircraft with magnetic anomaly detection (MAD) equipment. Navies use the deperming procedure, in conjunction with degaussing, as a countermeasure against this.

Specialized deperming facilities, such as the United States Navy's Lambert's Point Deperming Station at Naval Station Norfolk, or Pacific Fleet Submarine Drive-In Magnetic Silencing Facility (MSF) at Joint Base Pearl Harbor–Hickam, are used to perform the procedure. During a close-wrap magnetic treatment, heavy-gauge copper cables encircle the hull and superstructure of the vessel, and high electrical currents (up to 4000 amperes) are pulsed through the cables. This has the effect of "resetting" the ship's magnetic signature to the ambient level after flashing its hull with electricity. It is also possible to assign a specific signature that is best suited to the particular area of the world in which the ship will operate. In drive-in magnetic silencing facilities, all cables are either hung above, below and on the sides, or concealed within the structural elements of facilities. Deperming is "permanent". It is only done once unless major repairs or structural modifications are done to the ship.

=== Early experiments ===
With the introduction of iron ships, the adverse effect of the metal hull on steering compasses was noted. It was also observed that lightning strikes had a significant effect on compass deviation, identified in some extreme cases as being caused by the reversal of the ship's magnetic signature. In 1866, Evan Hopkins of London registered a patent for a process "to depolarise iron vessels and leave them thenceforth free from any compass-disturbing influence whatever". The technique was described as follows: "For this purpose he employed a number of Grove's batteries and electromagnets. The latter were to be passed along the plates till the desired end had been obtained... the process must not be overdone for fear of re-polarising in the opposite direction." The invention was, however, reported to be "incapable of being carried to a successful issue", and "quickly died a natural death".

== Color cathode-ray tubes ==
Color CRT displays, the technology underlying many television and computer monitors before the early 2000s, require degaussing. Many CRT displays use a shadow mask (a perforated metal screen) near the front of the tube to ensure that each electron beam hits the corresponding phosphors of the correct color. If this plate becomes magnetized (e.g. if someone sweeps a magnet on the screen or places loudspeakers nearby), it imparts an undesired deflection to the electron beams and the displayed image becomes distorted and discolored.

To minimize this, CRTs have a copper or aluminum coil wrapped around the front of the display, known as the degaussing coil. Monitors without an internal coil can be degaussed using an external handheld version. Internal degaussing coils in CRTs are generally much weaker than external degaussing coils, since a better degaussing coil takes up more space. A degauss circuit induces an oscillating magnetic field with a decreasing amplitude which leaves the shadow mask with a reduced residual magnetization.

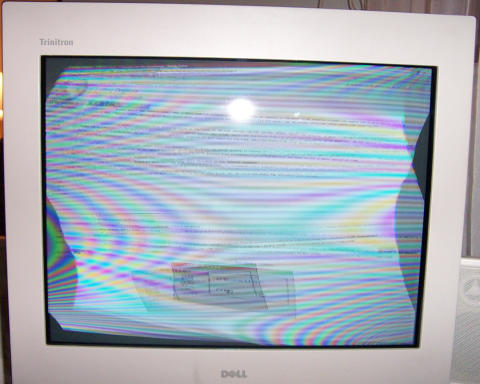
A degaussing in progress

Many televisions and monitors automatically degauss their picture tube when switched on, before an image is displayed. The high current surge that takes place during this automatic degauss is the cause of an audible "thunk", a loud hum or some clicking noises, which can be heard (and felt) when televisions and CRT computer monitors are switched on, due to the capacitors discharging and injecting current into the coil. Visually, this causes the image to shake dramatically for a short period of time. A degauss option is also usually available for manual selection in the operations menu in such appliances.

In most commercial equipment the AC current surge to the degaussing coil is regulated by a simple positive temperature coefficient (PTC) thermistor device, which initially has a low resistance, allowing a high current, but quickly changes to a high resistance, allowing minimal current, due to self-heating of the thermistor. Such devices are designed for a one-off transition from cold to hot at power up; "experimenting" with the degauss effect by repeatedly switching the device on and off may cause this component to temporarily fail. The effect will also be weaker, since the PTC will not have had time to cool off.

== Magnetic data storage media ==
Data is stored in the magnetic media, such as hard drives, floppy disks, and magnetic tape, by making very small areas called magnetic domains change their magnetic alignment to be in the direction of an applied magnetic field. This phenomenon occurs in much the same way a compass needle points in the direction of the Earth's magnetic field. Degaussing, commonly called erasure, leaves the domains in random patterns with no preference to orientation, thereby rendering previous data unrecoverable. There are some domains whose magnetic alignment is not randomized after degaussing. The information these domains represent is commonly called magnetic remanence or remanent magnetization. Proper degaussing will ensure there is insufficient magnetic remanence to reconstruct the data.

Erasure via degaussing may be accomplished in two ways: in AC erasure, the medium is degaussed by applying an alternating field that is reduced in amplitude over time from an initial high value (i.e., AC powered); in DC erasure, the medium is saturated by applying a unidirectional field (i.e., DC powered or by employing a permanent magnet). A degausser is a device that can generate a magnetic field for degaussing magnetic storage media. The magnetic field needed for degaussing magnetic data storage media is a powerful one that normal magnets cannot easily achieve and maintain.

=== Irreversible damage to some media types ===
Many forms of generic magnetic storage media can be reused after degaussing, including reel-to-reel audio tape, VHS videocassettes, and floppy disks. These older media types are simply a raw medium which are overwritten with fresh new patterns, created by fixed-alignment read/write heads.

For certain forms of computer data storage, however, such as modern hard disk drives and some tape drives, degaussing renders the magnetic media completely unusable and damages the storage system. This is due to the devices having an infinitely variable read/write head positioning mechanism which relies on special servo control data (e.g. Gray Code) that is meant to be permanently recorded onto the magnetic media. This servo data is written onto the media a single time at the factory using special-purpose servo writing hardware.

The servo patterns are normally never overwritten by the device for any reason and are used to precisely position the read/write heads over data tracks on the media, to compensate for sudden jarring device movements, thermal expansion, or changes in orientation. Degaussing indiscriminately removes not only the stored data but also the servo control data, and without the servo data the device is no longer able to determine where data is to be read or written on the magnetic medium. The servo data must be rewritten to become usable again; with modern hard drives, this is generally not possible without manufacturer-specific and often model-specific service equipment.

== Tape recorders ==
In tape recorders such as reel-to-reel and compact cassette audio tape recorders, remnant magnetic fields will over time gather on metal parts such as guide posts tape heads. These are points that come into contact with the magnetic tape. The remnant fields can cause an increase in audible background noise during playback. Cheap, handheld consumer degaussers can significantly reduce this effect.

== Types of degaussers ==
Degaussers range in size from small ones used in offices for erasing magnetic data storage devices, to industrial-size degaussers for use on piping, ships, submarines, and other large-sized equipment and vehicles. Rating and categorizing degaussers depends on the strength of the magnetic field the degausser generates, the method of generating a magnetic field in the degausser, the type of operations the degausser is suitable for, the working rate of the degausser based on whether it is a high volume degausser or a low volume degausser, and mobility of the degausser among others. From these criteria of rating and categorization, there are thus electromagnetic degaussers, permanent magnet degaussers as the main types of degaussers.

=== Electromagnetic degaussers ===
An electromagnetic degausser passes an electrical charge through a degaussing coil to generate a magnetic field. Sub-types of electromagnetic degaussers are several such as Rotating Coil Degaussers and Pulse Demagnetization Technology degaussers since the technologies used in the degaussers are often developed and patented by respective manufacturing companies such as Verity Systems and Maurer Magnetic among others, so that the degausser is suitable for its intended use. Electromagnetic degaussers generate strong magnetic fields, and have a high rate of work.

==== Rotating coil degausser ====
Performance of a degaussing machine is the major determinant of the effectiveness of degaussing magnetic data storage media. Effectiveness does not improve when the media passes through the same degaussing magnetic field more than once. Rotating the media by 90 degrees improves effectiveness of degaussing the media. One magnetic media degaussers’ manufacturer, Verity Systems, has used this principle in a rotating coil technique they developed. Their rotating coil degausser passes the magnetic data storage media being erased through a magnetic field generated using two coils in the degaussing machine with the media on a variable-speed conveyor belt. The two coils generating a magnetic field are rotating; with one coil positioned above the media and the other coil positioned below the media.

==== Pulse degaussing ====
Pulse degaussing technology involves the cyclic application of electric current for a fraction of a second to the coil being used to generate a magnetic field in the degausser. The process starts with the maximum voltage applied and held for only a fraction of a second to avoid overheating the coil, and then the voltages applied in subsequent seconds are reduced in sequence at varying differences until no current is applied to the coil. Pulse degaussing saves on energy costs, produces high magnetic field strength, is suitable for degaussing large assemblies, and is reliable due to zero-error degaussing achievement.

=== Permanent magnet degausser ===
Permanent magnet degaussers use magnets of rare earth elements and require no electricity. Permanent magnet degaussers require adequate shielding of their magnetic fields to prevent unintended degaussing; this shielding usually causes permanent magnet degaussers to be bulky. When small-sized, they are suited for mobile use.

== See also ==
- Data remanence
