= Optimalny Variant =

Russian rock group

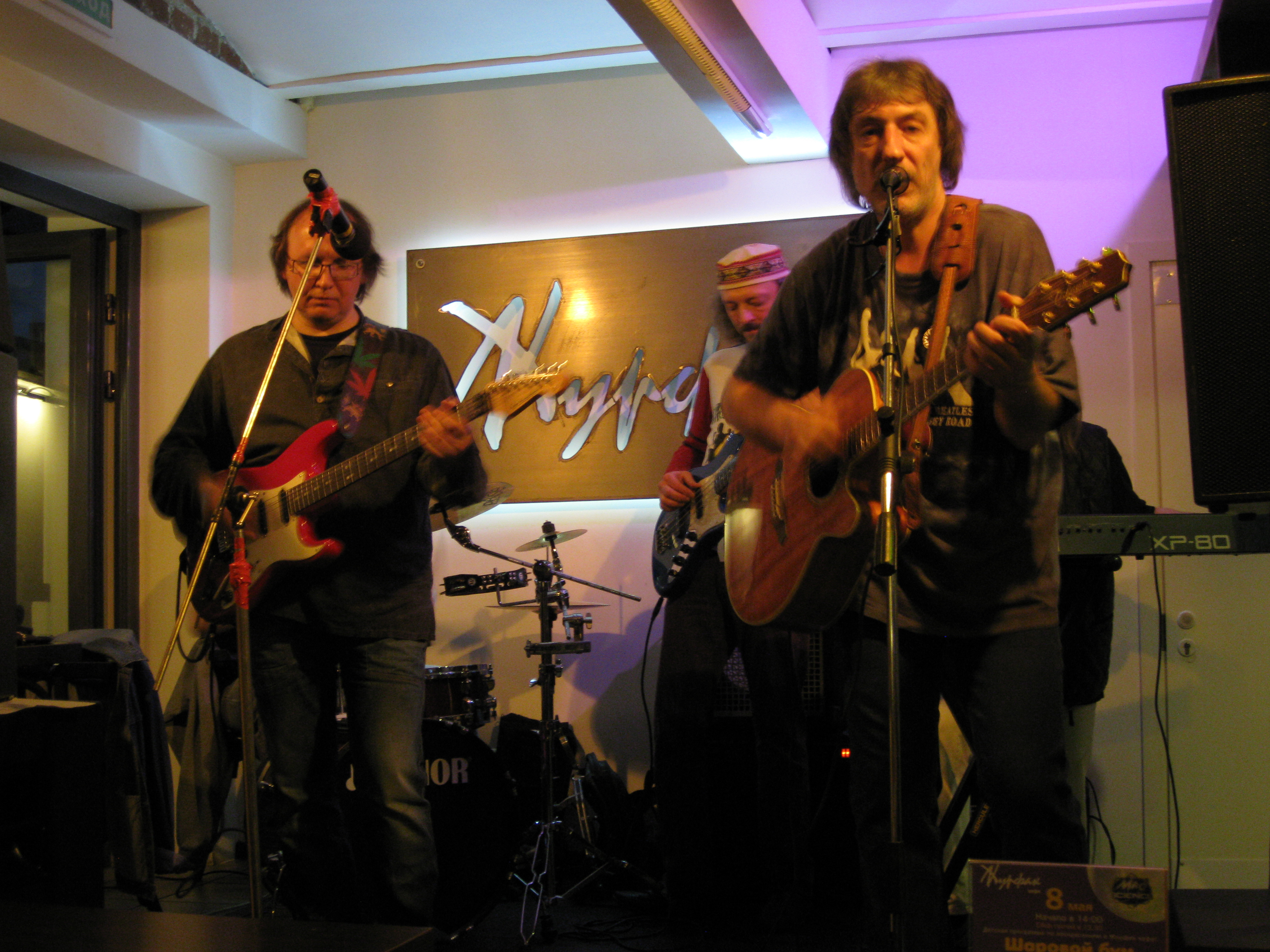
- Optimalny Variant in 2011

Background information
- Origin: Moscow, Russia
- Genres: Blues rock
- Years active: 1980–present
- Labels: Repei
- Members: Oleg Chilap; Alexander Lipnitsky; Pyotr Anikin; Zergy; Oleg Nazarov
- Past members: Valeriy Chilap; Valeriy Chelikanov
- Website: http://www.optimalvariant.ru/

Optimalny Variant (Russian: Оптимальный Вариант, Optimal Variant) is a Russian rock group.

It was formed in Moscow, Soviet Union, by Oleg Chilap (also known as O! Chilap, vocals and acoustic guitar), Alexander Lipnitsky (bass) and Pyotr Anikin (drums), with a purpose to "oppose the existed rock-movements in Moscow". The group was influenced by the music of The Beatles, poems of Alexander Blok and marxist theory.

The poetry of O! Chilap is full of original metaphors and kalamburs. His lyrics reflect a philosophical view of life, with man's inner freedom constituting the central idea.

Optimalny Variant was awarded by prizes at rock-festivals, included "Beatlomania" of 1989. They are organizing the "Apple Years Street" Yearly Festival.

Optimalny Variant was considered by Rossiyskaya Gazeta as the main successor of "post-Beatles period moods and harmonies" on Russian rock scene.

== Selected discography ==
- PoshliNa, 1988
- Rizhiy albom, 1998
- Legends of Russian Rock, 2003

== Sources ==
- Rock Music in the USSR, Moscow, 1990, p. 260-261
