= Russian landing ship Pyotr Morgunov =

Ivan Gren-class landing ship

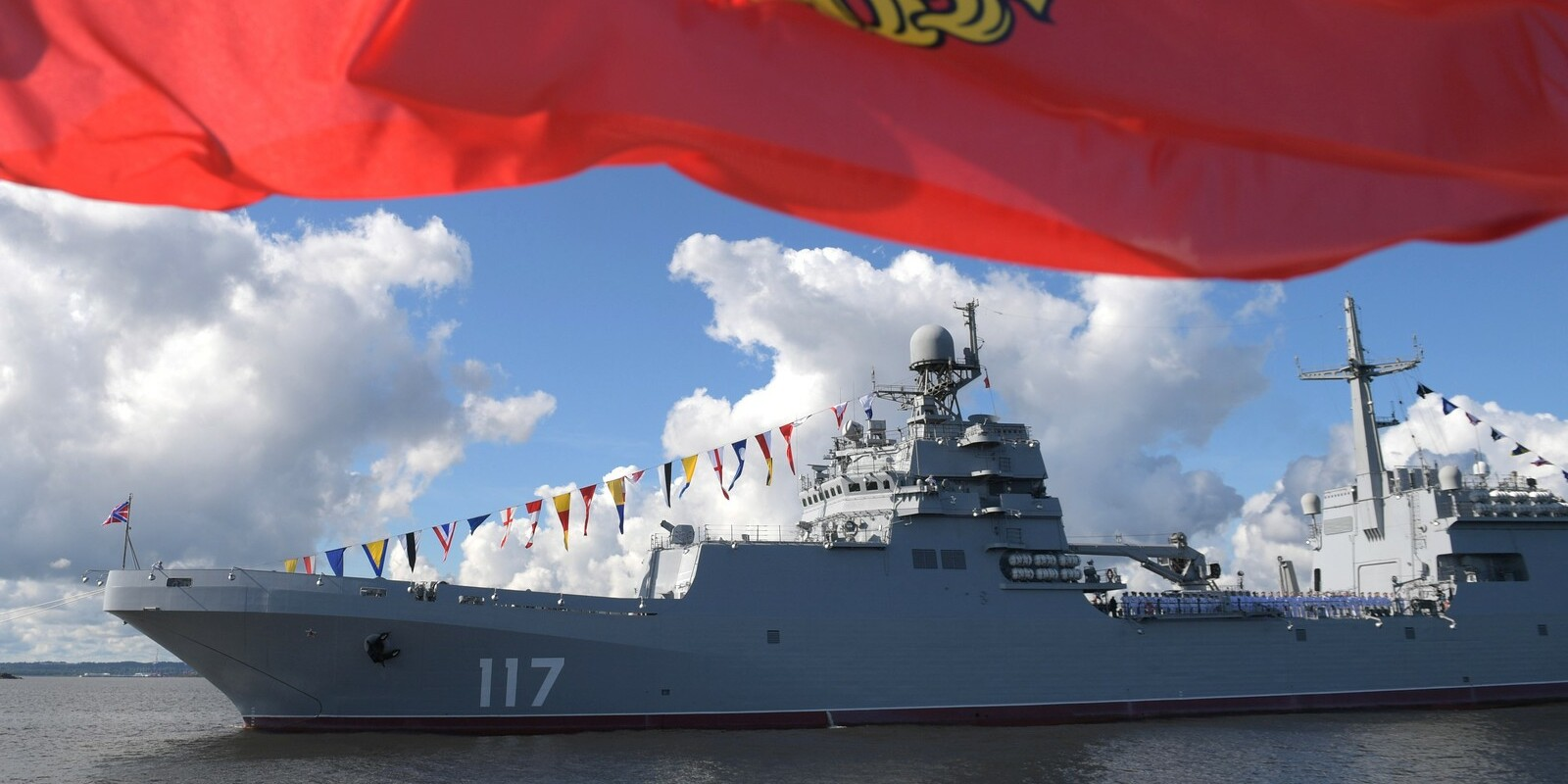
- Pyotr Morgunov in 2020

History

Russia
- Name: Pyotr Morgunov
- Namesake: Pyotr Morgunov
- Builder: Yantar Shipyard, Kaliningrad
- Laid down: 11 June 2015
- Launched: 25 May 2018
- Commissioned: 23 December 2020
- Status: Active

General characteristics
- Class & type: Ivan Gren-class landing ship
- Displacement: 6,600 tons full load
- Length: 135 m (442 ft 11 in)
- Beam: 16.5 m (54 ft 2 in)
- Propulsion: Kolomna 10D49 diesel engine
- Speed: 18 knots (33 km/h; 21 mph)
- Range: 3,500 nmi (6,500 km; 4,000 mi) at 16 knots (30 km/h; 18 mph)
- Capacity: 13 main battle tanks 40 BTR or IFV and 300 troops
- Complement: ~100
- Armament: 1 × 30 mm AK-630M-2 gun; 2 × 30 mm AK-630 guns; 2 × 14.5 mm KPV type gun
- Aviation facilities: Hangar for 2 Ka-27 ASW or Ka-29 transport-attack helicopters

Pyotr Morgunov (Russian: Пётр Моргунов) is an Ivan Gren-class Landing Ship, Tank (LST) of the Russian Navy.

The second of the class after her sister ship Ivan Gren, Pyotr Morgunov was laid down in 2015, launched in 2018, and commissioned in 2020. She was assigned to the Northern Fleet's 121st Landing Ship Brigade. In January 2022, she sailed with several other landing ships to the Black Sea, shortly before the Russo-Ukrainian war. She has since been based in the Black Sea.

== Design ==
The Ivan Gren-class landing ships, designated Project 11711 by the Russian Navy, were designed by the Neva Design Bureau to replace the Soviet-era Ropucha and Tapir-class large landing ships. The ships, a development of the Project 1171 Tapir design, are intended to land troops and transport military equipment over a range of 4,000 nautical miles (7,400 km; 4,600 mi). The ships can carry up to 300 troops, or 13 tanks, or 35 armoured personnel carriers or infantry fighting vehicles. The ships also carry Ka-29 transport-attack helicopters.

== Construction and commissioning ==
Pyotr Morgunov was the second Ivan Gren-class landing ship to be built, being ordered by Ministry of Defence in September 2014, and laid down at the Yantar Shipyard, Kaliningrad on 11 June 2015. Work on her sister ship, Ivan Gren, laid down in 2004, was delayed for a number of years, only being launched in 2014. Pyotr Morgunov was scheduled for delivery in 2018, but this was also delayed. Sea trials began on 13 December 2019, with the ship returning to the Yantar yard in late March 2020 for further work. She resumed trials in late May 2020, which were completed on 13 November. She was commissioned into the navy on 23 December 2020 in a ceremony attended by Commander-in-Chief of the Russian Navy, Admiral Nikolai Yevmenov. She was named in honour of Lieutenant-General Pyotr Morgunov, a coastal defence commander of the Soviet Navy who distinguished himself during the Siege of Sevastopol in the Second World War.

== Service ==
On commissioning under her first commander, Captain 2nd rank Vyacheslav Solovyov, Pyotr Morgunov was assigned to the Northern Fleet's 121st Landing Ship Brigade. She arrived at her homeport of Severomorsk on 30 January.

In mid-January Pyotr Morgunov and two other Northern Fleet landing ships, the Ropucha-class vessels Olenegorsky Gornyak and Georgy Pobedonosets, set sail for the Mediterranean Sea. En route they joined up with three Ropucha-class vessels sailing from the Baltic Fleet, Korolyov, Minsk, and Kaliningrad. The six ships were shadowed on their voyage by NATO vessels, including as they passed through the English Channel by HMS Dragon and HMS Tyne. After calling at the Tartus naval base for replenishment, the ships entered the Black Sea, nominally for exercises with the Black Sea Fleet. The Barents Observer reported that the ships were heavily loaded and low in the water, and carrying equipment and troops from the Northern Fleet's elite forces.

Pyotr Morgunov was deployed in the Black Sea during the Russian invasion of Ukraine. She was at times in port at Novorossiysk, and may have been used to ferry supplies and equipment across the Kerch Strait following the July 2023 attack on the Crimean Bridge.
