= Morgunov =

Morgunov (Russian: Моргунов) is a Russian masculine surname, its feminine counterpart is Morgunova. It may refer to

- Aleksandr Morgunov (born 1995), Russian football player
- Aleksei Morgunov (1884–1935), Russian avant-garde painter
- Lyubov Morgunova (born 1971), Russian long-distance runner
- Nikita Morgunov (born 1975), Russian basketball player
- Nina Morgunova (born 1951), Russian middle-distance runner
- Pyotr Morgunov (1902–1985), Soviet military officer
- Sergey Morgunov (pilot) (1918–1946), Soviet flying ace
- Sergey Morgunov (athlete) (born 1993), Russian long jumper
- Yevgeny Morgunov (1927–1999), Russian actor
