= Nikolai Amelko =

Soviet naval officer

Nikolai Nikolayevich Amelko
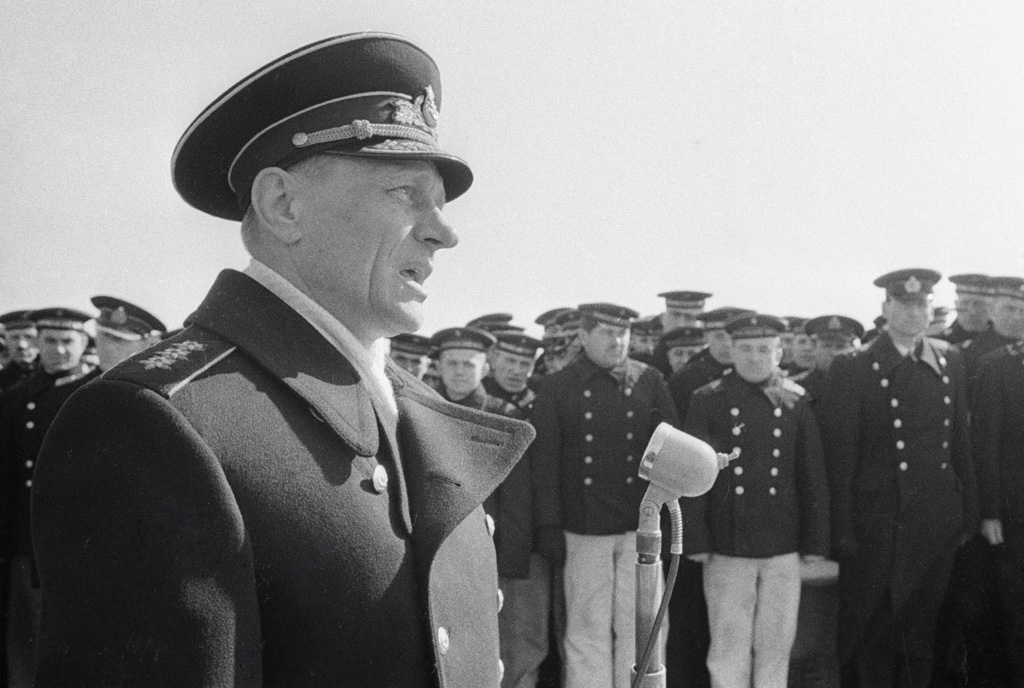
- Born: 22 November 1914; Petrograd, Russian Empire
- Died: 27 June 2007 (aged 92) Moscow, Russia
- Buried: Troyekurovskoye Cemetery
- Allegiance: Soviet Union
- Branch: Soviet Navy
- Service years: 1931-1987
- Rank: Admiral
- Commands: Pacific Fleet
- Conflicts: Winter War; Second World War
- Awards: Order of Honour; Order of Lenin (three times); Order of the Red Banner (three times); Order of Nakhimov First and Second Classes; Order of the Patriotic War First Class (twice); Order of the Red Star (three times); Order of the Red Banner of Labour; Order "For Service to the Homeland in the Armed Forces of the USSR" Third Class

Nikolai Nikolayevich Amelko (Russian: Николай Николаевич Амелько; 22 November 1914 – 27 June 2007) was an officer of the Soviet Navy. He served during the Winter War and the Second World War and reached the rank of admiral.

Born in 1914, Amelko grew up in the early years of the Soviet Union. Deciding on a naval career at an early age from time spent around naval units in the port city of Leningrad and its environs, he studied at the M. V. Frunze Higher Naval School and was commissioned an officer on graduation. His career nearly ended in disaster when he was accused of crimes during the Great Purge, but was acquitted. He went on to serve on a training ship of the Baltic Fleet, seeing service during the Winter War, and then during the siege of Leningrad during the Second World War. He had command of a detachment of minesweepers which had been converted to lay smoke screens, seeing action in the Gulf of Finland throughout the war. Decorated and promoted for his service, he was appointed to take charge of demining operations in the gulf during the last months of the war, and into the postwar years.

In 1956, now a rear-admiral, Amelko was appointed chief of staff and first deputy commander of the Pacific Fleet. He oversaw the introduction of new technologies and tactics, and the complex international relations with Japan and the United States. Appointed to command the Pacific Fleet in 1962, he dealt with several crises in the region, including the response to the capture of the US spy ship USS Pueblo by North Korean forces, and the loss of the Golf II-class submarine K-129, both in 1968. In 1969, Amelko was appointed deputy for anti-submarine forces, and in 1978, he became a Deputy Chief of the General Staff of the Armed Forces of the Soviet Union, a post he held until 1986. After a brief period as military adviser in the Group of Inspectors General, he retired from the armed forces in 1987. He worked at the Ministry of Foreign Affairs's scientific coordination centre, consulting on military and naval issues, and travelled widely, speaking on naval topics.

He was involved in local and national politics, as a deputy of the Supreme Soviet of the Russian Soviet Federative Socialist Republic, and the Supreme Soviet of the Soviet Union. He was a candidate of naval sciences, and was awarded the Lenin Prize for his work in the creation of a satellite system covering the oceans. He wrote his memoirs, and died in 2007 at the age of 92, having received 43 state awards.

== Early years and education ==
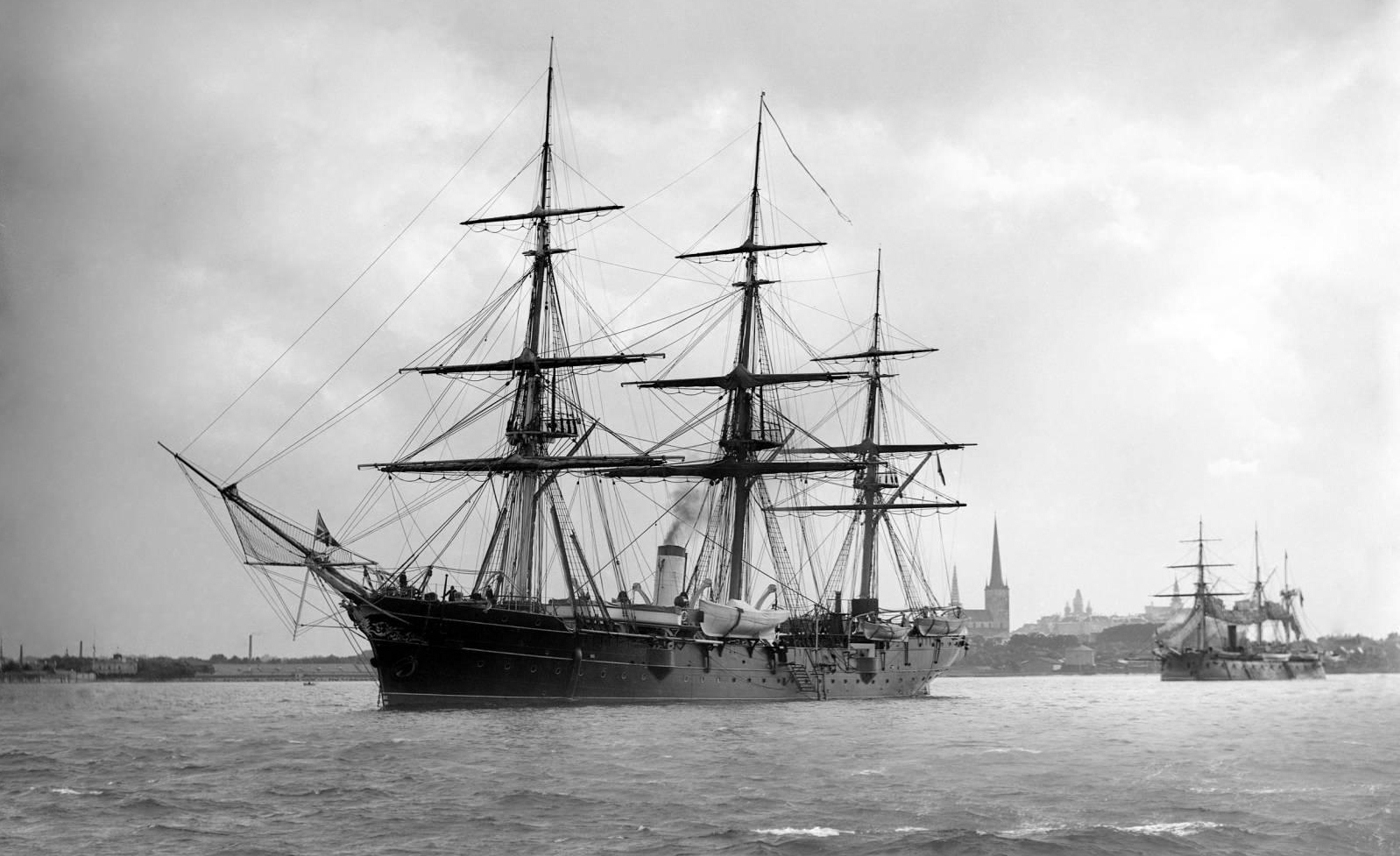
The training ship Verny, later renamed Leningradsovet, and Amelko's first command.

Amelko was born on 22 November 1914 in Petrograd, in what was then the Russian Empire. His father, Nikolai Lukich (1880–1957) was a worker of Belarusian ethnicity. His mother, Tatyana Kalinovna (1882–1917), died when Nikolai was two years old, and he was raised by his stepmother, Anna Mikhailovna. Born during the First World War, Nikolai Amelko grew up during the war and the February and October Revolutions in 1917, seeing the Russian Empire become the Soviet Union. The family lived on the 2nd line of Vasilyevsky Island, with Amelko becoming involved in local clubs and the Young Pioneers. He travelled to perform in factories and plants, in military units. Having visited the naval and border guard forces on Goloday Island and Kronstadt, Amelko decided to become a sailor.

Amelko studied at a factory school before working for two years from the age of 14, and in 1931, at the age of 16, enrolled in the M. V. Frunze Higher Naval School. As a cadet he underwent practical training on the schooner Ucheba, other training ships of the school, and the cruiser Aurora. After graduating from the school in 1936, he was commissioned as a lieutenant and sent to Moscow to join the Red Army's Intelligence Directorate as assistant to the head of the directorate's naval department. Caught up in the Great Purge, he was accused of crimes, but soon acquitted. By 1937, he was commander of the electronic navigation department aboard the training ship Leningradsovet.

== Winter and Great Patriotic Wars ==
In November 1939 the Soviet Union invaded Finland, and the Winter War broke out. Still holding his post on the Leningradsovet, Amelko was assigned to command the landing craft in an amphibious assault on Seskar. After completing the task successfully, he was appointed executive officer of the Leningradsovet, and then her commander. He commanded her for training voyages, taking cadets into the Baltic and the North Seas, and was still her captain when in June 1941, the Axis invasion of the Soviet Union began. Amelko oversaw the hasty armament of his ship with anti-aircraft guns and machine guns, using them to counter enemy air attacks while based in Tallinn. A group of 20 sailors and petty officers were also deployed from the ship to bolster the city's defences.

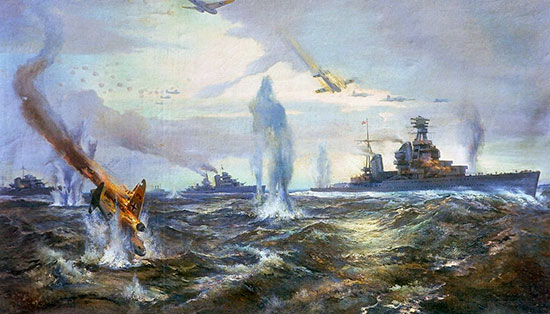
Voyage of the ships of the Red Banner Baltic Fleet from Tallinn to Kronstadt, August 1941, 1946, by Aleksandr Blinkov

With the Soviet position fast deteriorating by August 1941, a risky naval evacuation began. Leningradsovet and other ships based in the city evacuated large numbers of people and equipment from the city, undertaking a dangerous voyage to Kronstadt through mined waters, and while under heavy air attack. Leningradsovet provided anti-air gunfire, but suffered several personnel wounded, among whom was Amelko. Nevertheless, they were able to rescue 400 people from sinking ships, and reached Kronstadt. For his performance in the battle, Amelko was awarded the Order of the Red Banner, and an early promotion to the rank of captain-lieutenant.

Amelko now found himself based in Leningrad as the city endured a 900-day siege. Leningradsovet was sent to bolster its air and artillery defences, and to carry out reconnaissance missions. In January 1942, Amelko was appointed commander of a division of net layers, and then of minesweepers which had been converted to lay smoke screens. The smoke screens provided coverage for the fleet during air and artillery attacks, and allowed ships to operate between Leningrad and Kronstadt, and into the Gulf of Finland to carry out reconnaissance missions and to land troops behind enemy lines. Some instances, such as the landings on the island of Piisaari during the Beryozovye Landing Operation, turned into fraught battles with German ships. In winter when the gulf froze over, sailors transferred to using aerosledges to provide smoke screens. In late 1943 they supported the crossing of General Ivan Fedyuninsky's 2nd Shock Army from Lisy Nos to the Oranienbaum Bridgehead, beginning operations to lift the siege of Leningrad. For their efforts during the war, the smoke screen boat division was awarded the Order of the Red Banner, and Amelko received the Order of Nakhimov, 2nd class.

Following the lifting of the siege, and the advance of Soviet forces pushing the enemy out of the areas they had occupied, Amelko was appointed in early spring 1945 to be chief of staff of the Kronstadt Naval Defence Region's minesweeping brigade. This consisted of 12 divisions, amounting to 157 ships and boats, working to clear the area of the several hundred thousand mines of various types which had been laid during the war, a task only deemed completed in 1953.

== Postwar service ==
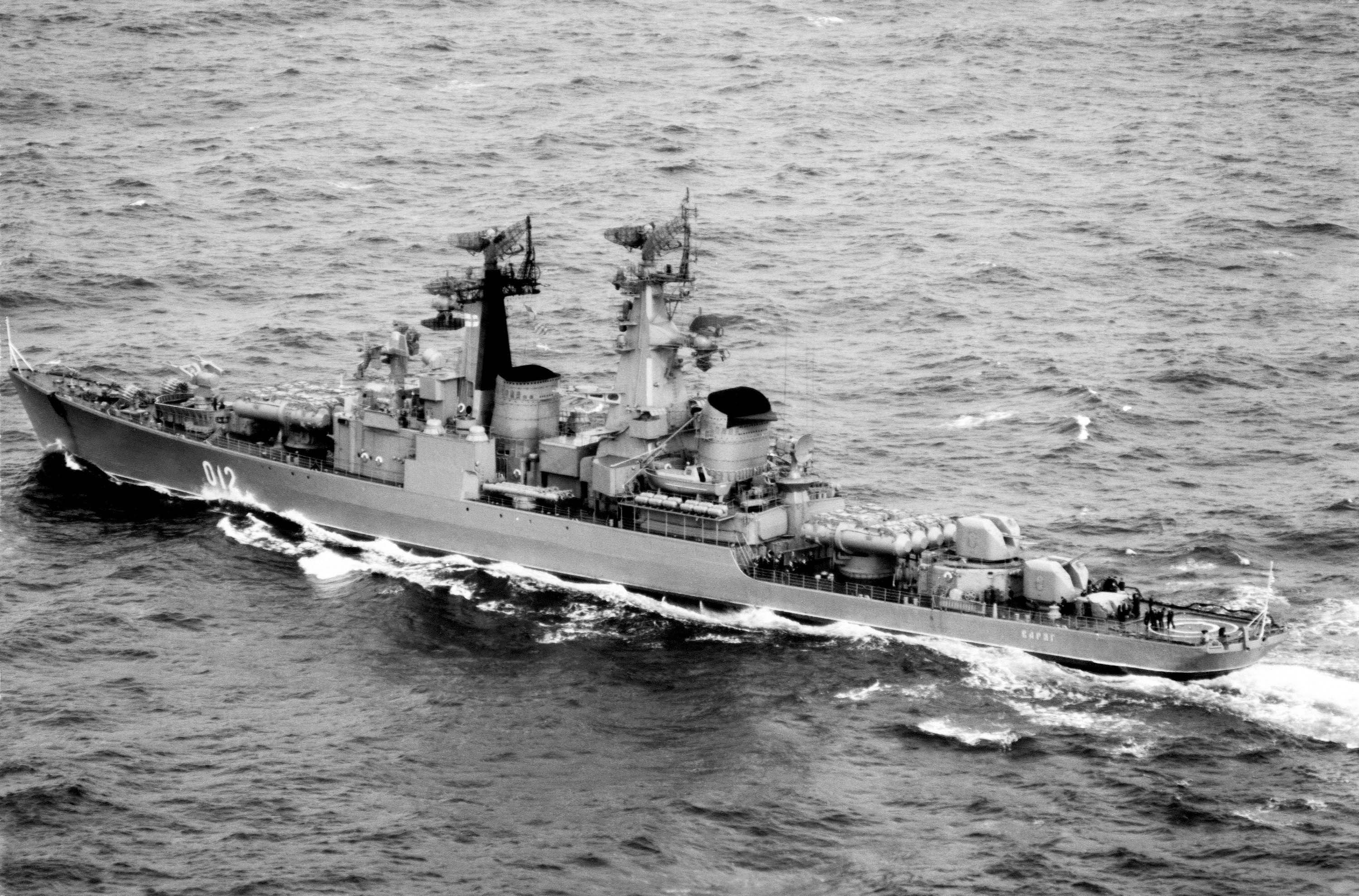
The cruiser Varyag, part of Amelko's Pacific Fleet, and deployed by him during tensions over the 1968 capture of the USS Pueblo

In 1949, Amelko was given command of a brigade of the Riga Naval Base's defence region, consisting of several divisions of minesweepers, patrol ships, and anti-submarine vessels. Amelko's forces were based at the mouth of the Daugava, and again had to carry out extensive minesweeping operations, with the assistance of naval divers. In 1952, Amelko was appointed chief of staff of the 64th Defence Ship Division based at Baltiysk, promoted to rear-admiral on 31 May 1954, later becoming its commander until 1955. He undertook studies at the Military Academy of the General Staff from 1953, graduating in 1956 and being appointed chief of staff and first deputy commander of the Pacific Fleet. In this role Amelko oversaw the introduction of new technologies and tactics involving nuclear submarines and missiles, and the complex international relations with Japan and the United States, the latter becoming increasingly involved in Vietnam. Promoted to vice-admiral on 9 May 1961, in 1962, Amelko was appointed commander of the Pacific Fleet. He was promoted to admiral on 13 April 1964. In January 1968, the US spy ship USS Pueblo was captured by North Korean forces, prompting a naval response, Operation Formation Star, with the aircraft carriers USS Midway and USS Enterprise deploying off Wonsan. The Soviet Union had a mutual assistance treaty with North Korea, and concerned by the US naval build up, Ameklo brought the Pacific Fleet to high alert status. Having reported the situation to Moscow, he sent the cruiser Varyag and a number of escorts, supported by Tupolev Tu-16s, to the area. The immediate crisis passed, and Amelko's actions were approved in retrospect by the Soviet government.

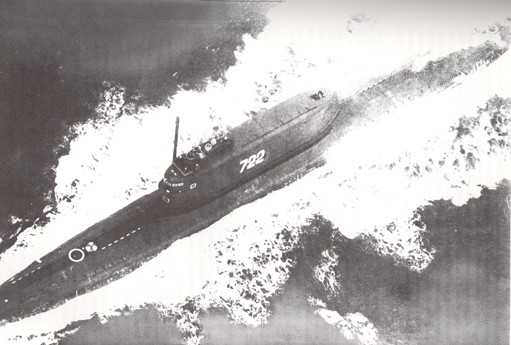
The Golf II-class submarine K-129. Her loss in 1968 led to an investigation, and a brief reprimand for Amelko.

Amelko had to deal with another crisis when the fleet's Golf II-class submarine K-129 went missing in the Pacific in March 1968. After determining that the submarine had sunk, a commission led by deputy chairman of the Council of Ministers Leonid Smirnov arrived in Vladivostok to assess possible causes. The investigation found no important violations by the fleet command, ultimately suggesting two hypotheses. The first was that the submarine had been lost in a collision while surfaced, or that she had been flooded through the submarine snorkel in bad weather. Smirnov pressed Amelko to indicate a culprit, to which Amelko replied "in the fleet, the commander is responsible for everything, report that I was to blame if you see violations in my actions." The commission returned to Moscow, and Amelko received a reprimand for unspecified reasons. The reprimand was expunged three months later by the Council of Ministers. Amelko later came to believe that the K-129 was lost after a collision with the USS Swordfish.

In 1969, Amelko was appointed by the navy's Commander-in-Chief, Sergey Gorshkov, to the newly created position of deputy for anti-submarine forces. Here he oversaw the introduction of stealthier submarines, and new methods to track and engage enemy submarines. In 1978, he became a Deputy Chief of the General Staff of the Armed Forces of the Soviet Union, a post he held until 1986. Among his achievements in this position was efforts to prevent incidents between foreign ships, and the reduction of US and Soviet forces in the Indian Ocean. He also worked with Cuban authorities on questions related to the development of their armed forces. In February 1986, he was appointed a military adviser in the Group of Inspectors General, stepping down in December 1987, and retiring from the armed forces. He went to work for a time at the Ministry of Foreign Affairs's scientific coordination centre, consulting on military and naval issues. He travelled widely, participating in the Edinburgh Conversations, and visiting 28 countries.

== Public, political and scientific work ==
Amelko was involved in politics at both the local and national level, having been elected to the Vladivostok city and regional councils during his time with the Pacific Fleet. He had also been a deputy of the Supreme Soviet of the Russian Soviet Federative Socialist Republic, and the Supreme Soviet of the Soviet Union. In retirement he was involved in public works, serving as deputy chairman of the International Committee "Peace to the Oceans", and participating in conferences, discussing the history of the Second World War, and naval affairs generally. He was a candidate of naval sciences, and was awarded the Lenin Prize for his work in the creation of a satellite system covering the oceans.

== Family and later life ==
Amelko was married for 51 years to Tatyana Nikolayevna (1917–1990). Their son, Sergei Nikolayevich, was born in 1945. He served in the navy, reaching captain 1st rank in the reserve, and later worked for the Ministry of Defence and the Russian Army. Their daughter, Ksenia Nikolayevna, was born in 1952, and became a project chief architect in Giprozdrav. Their grandson, Sergey Nikolayevich, was born in 1972 and also served in the navy, reaching captain 3rd rank and the position of deputy commander of the cruiser Aurora. Amelko also had two granddaughters. In retirement Amelko settled in Moscow, living in an apartment at Patriarch Ponds, which contained seascapes, ship models and artefacts from his travels. His hobbies were classical, memoir and specialized literature, theatre and cinema. He wrote his memoirs, published as In the Interests of the Fleet and the State. Memories of an Admiral.

Nikolai Amelko died in Moscow on 27 June 2007, at the age of 92. He was buried beside his wife in the city's Troyekurovskoye Cemetery.

== Honours and awards ==
Over his career Amelko received 43 state awards, divided between Soviet, Russian, and foreign awards. The Russian Federation awarded Amelko the Order of Honour in 2001. The Soviet government awarded him three Orders of Lenin, the Order of the Red Banner three times, the Order of Nakhimov first and second classes, the Order of the Patriotic War first class twice, the Order of the Red Banner of Labour, three Orders of the Red Star, and the Order "For Service to the Homeland in the Armed Forces of the USSR" third class, as well as various medals including the Medal of Zhukov and the Medal "For Battle Merit". The People's Republic of Bulgaria awarded him the Order of the People's Republic of Bulgaria second class. On 23 April 2019 the Project 22350 frigate Admiral Amelko, named for Nikolai Amelko, was laid down in the presence of Vladimir Putin.
