= USS Deperm =

Specialized naval vessel of United States Navy

History

United States
- Name: USS Deperm
- Builder: Albina Engine and Machine Works, Portland
- Laid down: 1943
- Launched: 1944
- Commissioned: 1945
- Reclassified: YDG-10
- Stricken: 21 February 1975
- Fate: Sunk as a target, 22 September 1982

General characteristics
- Type: Patrol Craft, Escort
- Displacement: 850 long tons (864 t)
- Length: 184 ft 6 in (56.24 m)
- Beam: 33 ft 1 in (10.08 m)
- Draft: 9 ft 5 in (2.87 m)
- Propulsion: 2 × General Motors 12-567A diesel engines, 2,900 hp (2,163 kW) each; 2 shafts
- Speed: 15.7 knots (29.1 km/h; 18.1 mph)
- Complement: 99
- Armament: 1 × 3"/50 caliber gun; 3 × twin 40 mm guns

USS Deperm (ADG-10) was a degaussing vessel of the United States Navy, named after the term deperm, a procedure for erasing the permanent magnetism from ships and submarines to camouflage them against magnetic detection vessels and enemy marine mines. Originally planned as a patrol craft escort (PCE-883), she was laid down in 1943, launched in 1944, and commissioned in 1945. She was subsequently redesignated a degaussing vessel, YDG-10, and named Deperm.

Struck from the Naval Register 21 February 1975, Deperm was sunk as a target 22 September 1982 at 32°58′0″N 119°41′0″W. According to the available depth data in 2020, at this location the bottom is between 1250m and 1500m along the edge of a basin.
