= Ivan Gren =

Soviet naval officer

Ivan Ivanovich Gren
- Born: 25 December [O.S. 13 December] 1898; Fellin, Governorate of Livonia, Russian Empire
- Died: 19 September 1960 (aged 61) Moscow, Soviet Union
- Buried: Novodevichy Cemetery
- Allegiance: Russian Empire; Soviet Union
- Branch: Imperial Russian Navy; Soviet Navy
- Service years: 1918-1960
- Rank: Vice-Admiral
- Conflicts: Siege of Leningrad
- Awards: Order of Lenin (twice); Order of the Red Banner (four times); Order of Nakhimov First Class

Ivan Ivanovich Gren (Russian: Иван Иванович Грен; 25 December [O.S. 13 December] 1898 – 19 September 1960) was an officer of the Imperial Russian and later Soviet Navies. He specialised in naval artillery and reached the rank of vice-admiral.

Born in the Russian Empire in 1898 (according to church records Johannes Grön),, Gren began studying for a naval career at the time of the outbreak of the First World War, starting to specialise in gunnery and having practical experience aboard training ships. He joined the Workers' and Peasants' Red Fleet following the October Revolution in 1917, and after graduating with a qualifications in naval artillery, served in the Baltic Fleet, soon rising to become the fleet's chief of artillery. Subsequently assigned to the Black Sea Fleet, he oversaw the defence of the Crimean coastline, before being appointed head of the Artillery Research Maritime Institute in 1935. Here he oversaw the development of naval artillery and related technologies for new ships being designed and built for the Soviet Navy.

Gren was in Leningrad when the Axis invasion of the Soviet Union began, and was given command of the naval artillery in the city and surrounding areas, developing effective methods to counter enemy bombardment during the long siege of the city. After a period with the Main Naval Staff following the lifting of the siege, by 1947 he was teaching at the Naval Academy, a position he held up to his retirement in 1960, dying shortly afterwards. He received a number of awards during his career, and was honoured with the naming of the Ivan Gren, nameship of the Ivan Gren-class landing ships.

== Early years and education ==
Gren was born on 25 December [O.S. 13 December] 1898 in Fellin, Governorate of Livonia, Russian Empire, now known as Viljandi, in Estonia. His name in Estonian was rendered as Johannes Green. On the outbreak of the First World War in 1914, he was enrolled as a cadet in the Imperial Russian Navy's gunnery school in Kronstadt, taking classes for artillery non-commissioned officers preparing for service with the Baltic Fleet. He received practical experience aboard the training ships Nikolayev, Verny, and Petr Veliky, the minesweeper Argun, and the destroyer Azard. With the February and October Revolutions in 1917, the Baltic Fleet ceased to be a force of the Russian Empire, and instead became part of the Workers' and Peasants' Red Fleet. Gren joined the Red Navy, studying at the Fleet Command School and graduating in 1922 with a speciality in artillery. He was assigned to the destroyer Karl Marx as a watch officer, later as an artillery commander, and after completing the Higher Special Naval Courses in 1925, became chief of artillery of the Baltic Fleet's destroyer brigade, and then in 1926, the Baltic Fleet's chief of artillery.

== Crimea and gunnery research ==
In 1930, Gren was assigned to the Soviet Union's southern coastline, being appointed commander of the Coastal Defence of the Crimean Fortified Region of the Black Sea Fleet. In 1931 he was advanced to the post of Commander and Commissar of the Crimean Fortified Region, a post he held until 1935. In 1934, he was awarded a personalized gold watch for the excellent state of his forces.In 1935 he was appointed head of the Artillery Research Maritime Institute, and took charge of the development of naval artillery and related technologies for the expansive 1930s shipbuilding program. Under Gren's leadership the institute developed more than twenty new artillery systems, including the triple-turret mount 406-mm main guns for the Sovetsky Soyuz-class battleships, a triple 180-mm MK-3-180 gun for cruisers, a twin-turret 130-mm deck gun B-13 for destroyers, and the 100-mm anti-aircraft gun B-34. Gren also oversaw the development of new optics and sights for naval gunnery systems.

== Defending Leningrad ==
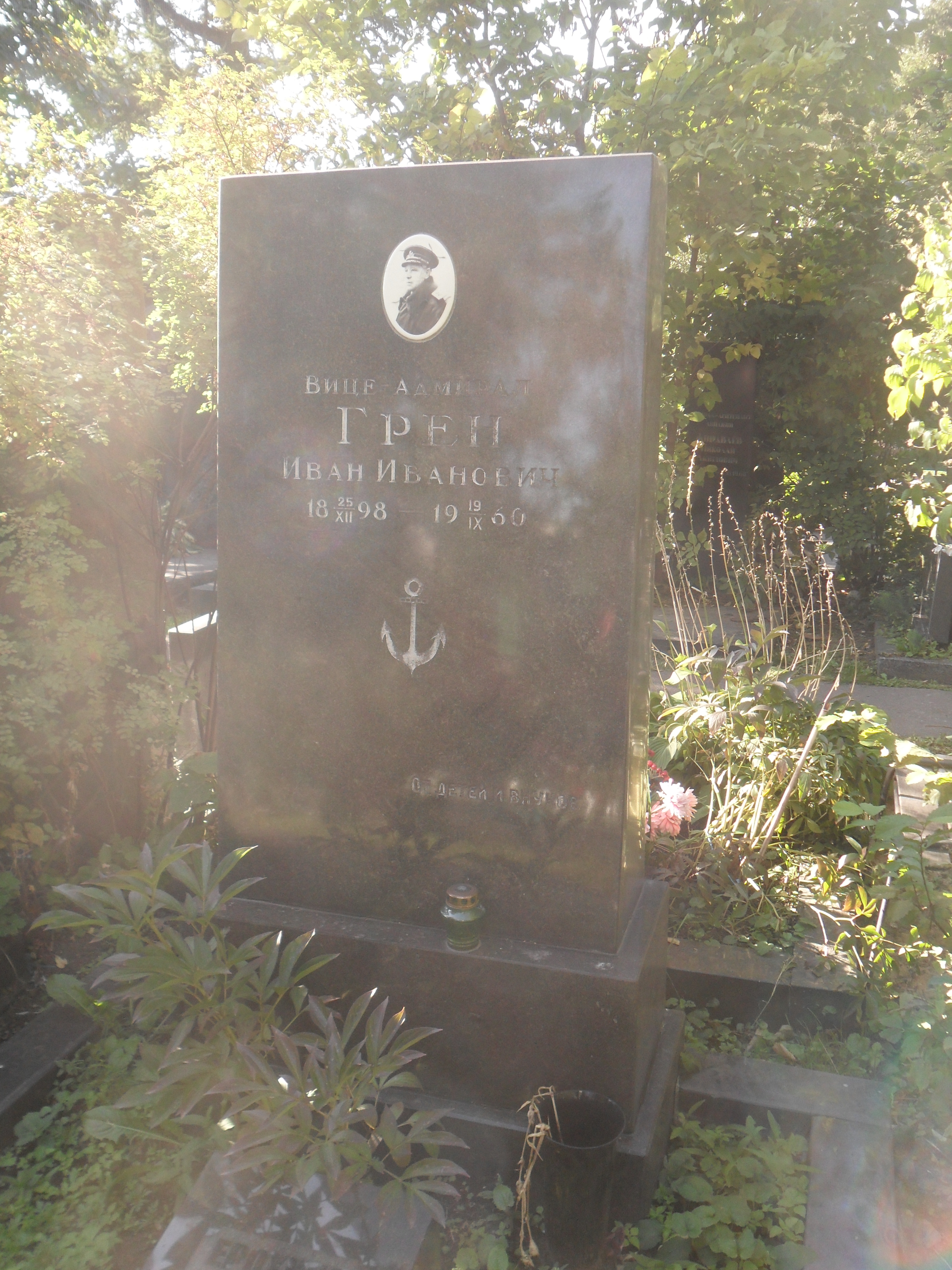
Gren's grave in the Novodevichy Cemetery

Gren was in Leningrad serving as head of the institute when the Axis invasion of the Soviet Union began in June 1941. By September, almost the entirety of the Baltic coastline was in Axis hands, and the siege of Leningrad began. As much of the Baltic Fleet as possible was evacuated to Leningrad and Kronstadt, and Gren, a rear-admiral since 1940, was given command of the concentrated force of Soviet naval artillery. For the three years of the siege, Gren directed counter-fire from the naval guns and fortresses, with the enemy front lines falling within range of Baltic Fleet artillery. He developed centralized control of artillery operating from different directions, and the precise interaction between naval artillery and the Ground Forces, significantly reducing the damage caused to the city by shelling. He also directed naval artillery fire during the efforts to break the Leningrad siege.

== Post-war life ==
When the siege was lifted in 1943, Gren was assigned to the Main Naval Staff as head of artillery at the Fleet Combat Training Directorate, and in 1945 he became head of the fleet's Combat Training Directorate and Deputy Chief of the Naval General Staff. He held this post until 1946, and in 1947 became Chief of the Academic Courses for Officers at the Naval Academy. He remained in this role until his retirement in March 1960, dying several months later, on 19 September 1960, at the age of 61, with the rank of vice-admiral. He was buried in the Novodevichy Cemetery.

== Honours and awards ==
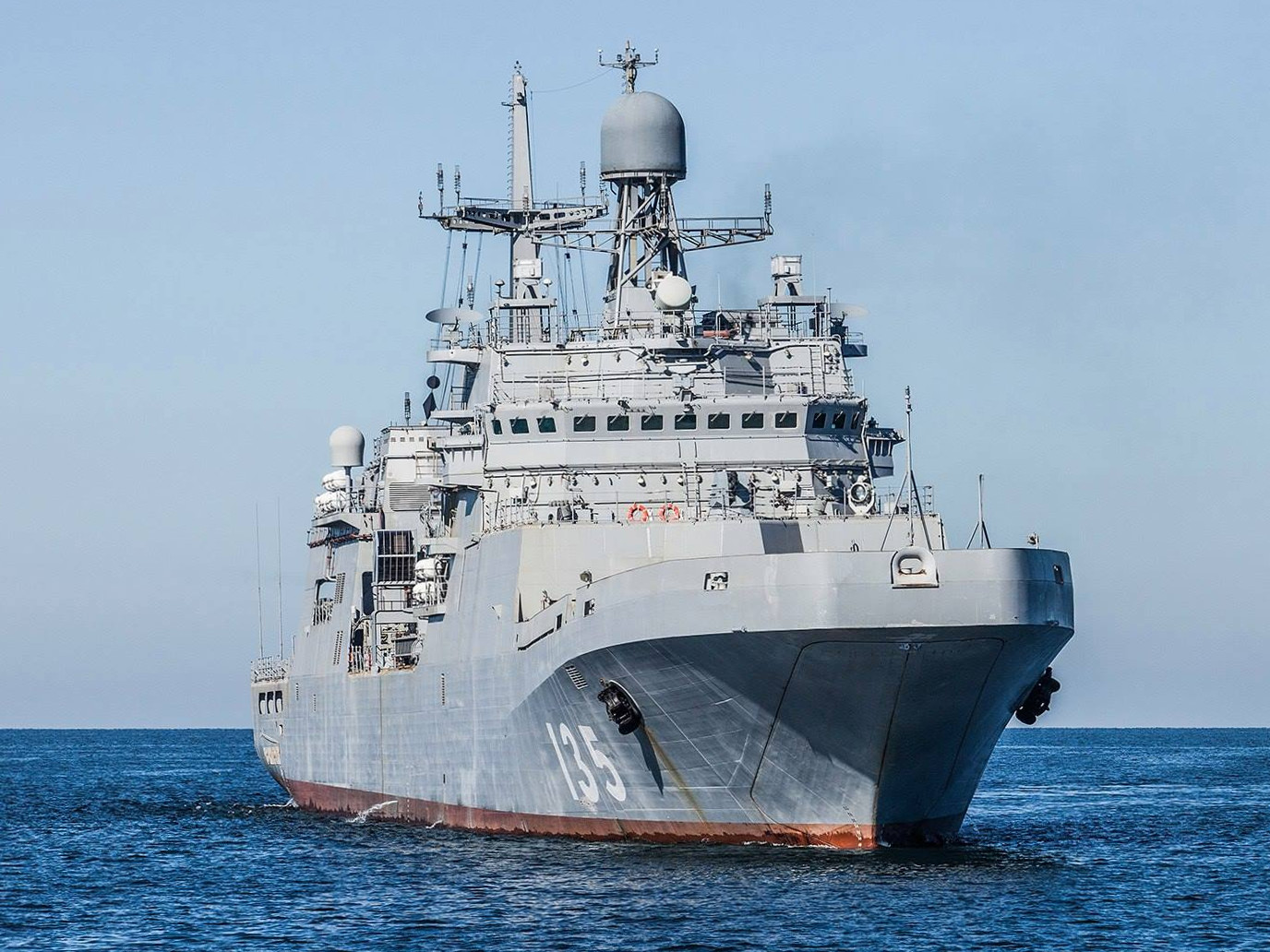
Ivan Gren, nameship of the Ivan Gren-class landing ships

Over his career Gren received the Order of Lenin twice, the Order of the Red Banner four times, and the Order of Nakhimov First Class, and various other medals. A Project 394RM fishing trawler bore the name Ivan Gren between 1975 and 2003. In 2004 the Ivan Gren, nameship of the Ivan Gren-class landing ships built for the Russian Navy, was laid down. She was commissioned into service in 2018.
