= Rossiyskaya Gazeta =

Russian government newspaper

Российская газета Rossiyskaya Gazeta

- Front page of the Rossiyskaya Gazeta, dated 25 February 2022 containing the full text of Vladimir Putin's presidential address "On conducting a special military operation", released a day prior and its screenshot. The main headline can be roughly translated as "Strength lies in justice and truth, and the truth is on our side."
- Type: Daily newspaper
- Format: Broadsheet
- Owner: Government of Russia (100%)
- Editor-in-chief: Vladislav Fronin
- Founded: 11 November 1990 (first issue)
- Language: Russian
- Headquarters: House 24, Ulitsa Pravda, Moscow
- Country: Russia
- Circulation: 185,445 (as of 2010)
- Website: rg.ru (in Russian)

Rossiyskaya Gazeta (Russian: Российская газета, lit. 'Russian Gazette') is a Russian newspaper published by the Government of Russia.

== History ==
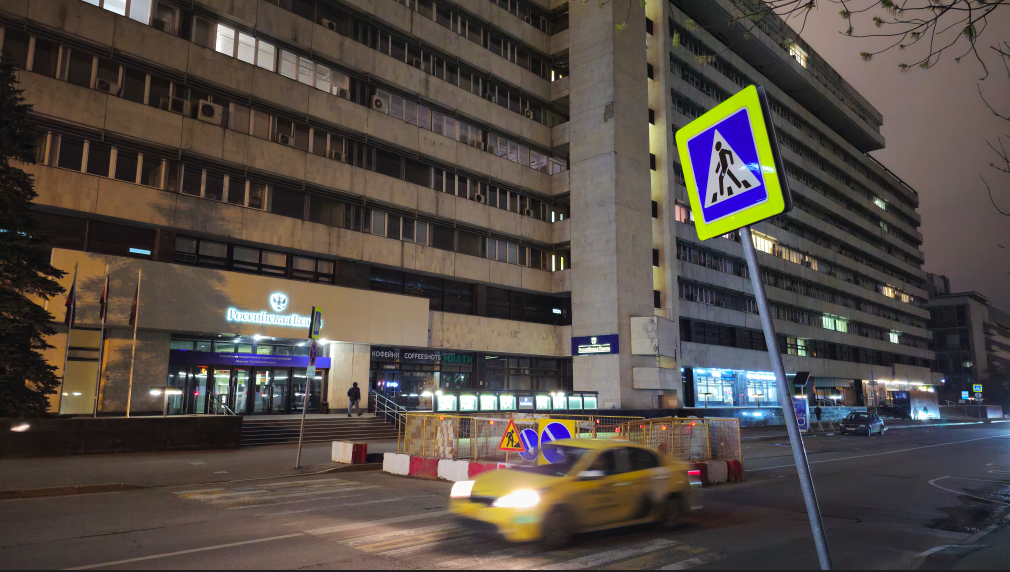
Headquarters of Rossiyskaya Gazeta

Rossiyskaya Gazeta was founded in 1990 by the Supreme Soviet of the Russian SFSR during the glasnost reforms in the Soviet Union, shortly before the country dissolved in 1991. Rossiyskaya Gazeta became official government newspaper of the Russian Federation, replacing Izvestia and Sovetskaya Rossiya newspapers, which were both privatized after the Soviet Union's dissolution.

The role of Rossiyskaya Gazeta is determined by the Law of the Russian Federation N 5-FZ, dated 14 June 1994 and entitled "On the Procedure of Publication and Enactment of Federal Constitutional Laws, Federal Laws and Acts of the Houses of the Federal Assembly", by the Decrees of the President of the Russian Federation, dated 23 May 1996 No. 763, "On the Procedure of Publication and Enactment of the Acts of the President of the Russian Federation, of the Government of Russia, and Statutory Legal Acts of the Federal Executive Authorities", as well as that dated 13 August 1998 No. 963, "On Adoption of Amendments to the Decree of the President of the Russian Federation dated 23 May 1996 № 763, "On the Procedure of Publication and Enactment of the Acts of the President of the Russian Federation, of the Government of the Russian Federation, and Statutory Legal Acts of the Federal Executive Authorities".

== Criticism ==
The 18 September 2007 issue featured a sheet devoted to the Polish film Katyń, directed by Andrzej Wajda, about the 1940 Katyn massacre. A short comment by Alexander Sabov was published, claiming that the widely accepted version of Soviet responsibility is based on a single dubious copy of a document, therefore evidence for it is not reliable. Subov's comment immediately provoked media frenzy in Poland, and on the following day the issue of the Polish newspaper Gazeta Wyborcza published relevant documents signed by Lavrenty Beria authorizing the massacre.

In May 2024, the European Union accused the newspaper of spreading propaganda and placed it on its sanctions list.

== See also ==
- Parlamentskaya Gazeta
- Russia Beyond
