= Oleg Chilap =

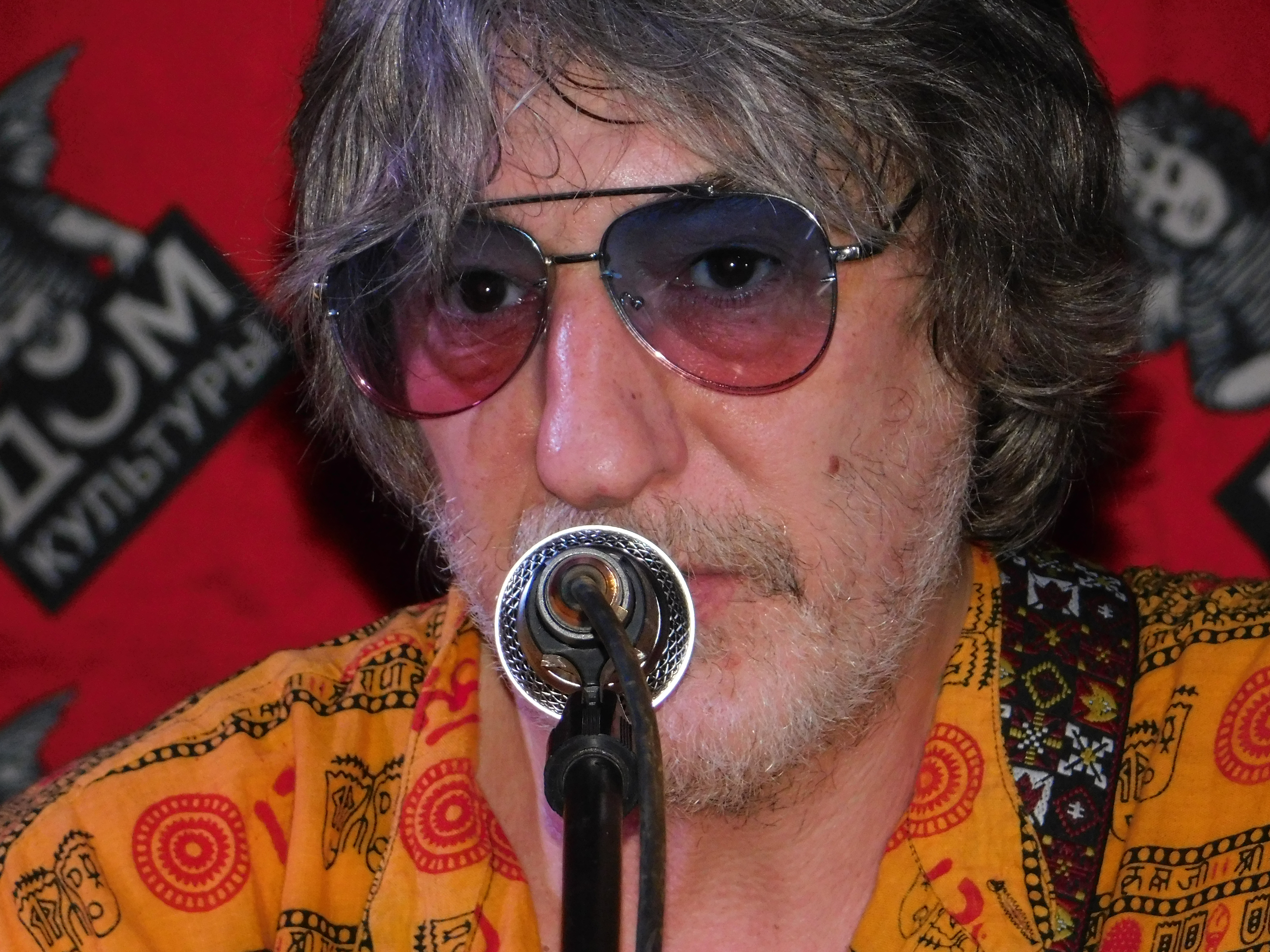
Oleg Chilap in Dom Kultury

O! Chilap or Oleg Viktorovich Chilap (Russian: Олег Викторович Чилап; born 2 August 1959 in Kharkiv, Ukrainian SSR) is a Russian rock musician, poet and writer. He is the leader of Optimalniy Variant Russian band. He is one of the best-known rock poets in Russia.

O! Chilap's lyrics and music are imbued with the spirit of the liberated generation, a spirit he describes as a "flux of culture", where Pink Floyd coexists with Debussy, and the father of Russian literary avant-garde Khlebnikov with Van Gogh.

In 1999 and 2000 he was awarded the President's grant for Literature. His book, 8 ruk, chtobi obnyat' tebya became a bestseller in Russia.
