= Pyotr Morgunov =

Soviet naval officer

Pyotr Alekseyevich Morgunov
- Born: 25 January 1902; Moscow, Russian Empire
- Died: 29 September 1985 (aged 83) Moscow, Soviet Union
- Buried: Kuntsevo Cemetery
- Allegiance: Soviet Union
- Branch: Soviet Navy
- Service years: 1919-1955
- Rank: Lieutenant General
- Conflicts: Russian Civil War; Second World War; Siege of Sevastopol; Crimean offensive
- Awards: Order of Lenin; Order of the Red Banner (three times); Order of Nakhimov First Class; Order of the Patriotic War First Class; Order of the Red Star (twice); Commander of the Order of the British Empire

Pyotr Alekseyevich Morgunov (Russian: Пётр Алексеевич Моргунов; 25 January 1902 – 29 September 1985) was an officer of the Soviet Navy. He worked in the navy's coastal defence branch and reached the rank of Lieutenant General.

Born into a working-class family in Moscow in 1902, Morgunov joined the Bolsheviks after the October Revolution and fought with the Red forces during the Russian Civil War. He specialised in artillery, undertaking studies in the theory and practice of gunnery, and served in the naval coastal defences in the Black Sea. By the early 1930s he was in command of Armoured Coastal Battery #35 on the Crimean coast, eventually rising to command the region's coastal defences prior to the Axis invasion of the Soviet Union in June 1941. Charged with defending Sevastopol from the advancing forces, Morgunov directed the fire of coastal artillery and the building of defences as the Siege of Sevastopol began. Morgunov played an important role in the subsequent months before the city finally fell to Axis forces in 1942.

Morgunov then served as deputy commander of the Black Sea Fleet for ground forces, and then chief of the Black Sea Fleet's coastal defence. He took part in the recapture of Sevastopol in 1944 in the Crimean offensive, and in May he was awarded the Order of Nakhimov, 1st degree, becoming the first of 82 people to receive this in the history of its award. Morgunov became commanding officer of the Black Sea Fleet Coastal Defences after the war, going on to be appointed head of the Coastal Artillery, Naval Infantry and Ground Units Combat Training Directorate, of the Main Combat Training Directorate, of the Naval Staff, and later head of coastal defence for the entire Soviet Navy. Retiring in 1955, he retired and wrote an account of the defence of Sevastopol before his death in 1985. Having received a number of awards over his career, Morgunov was portrayed in film in Sea on Fire, based partly on Morgunov's book. The Ivan Gren-class landing ship Pyotr Morgunov is named in his honour.

== Early years and education ==
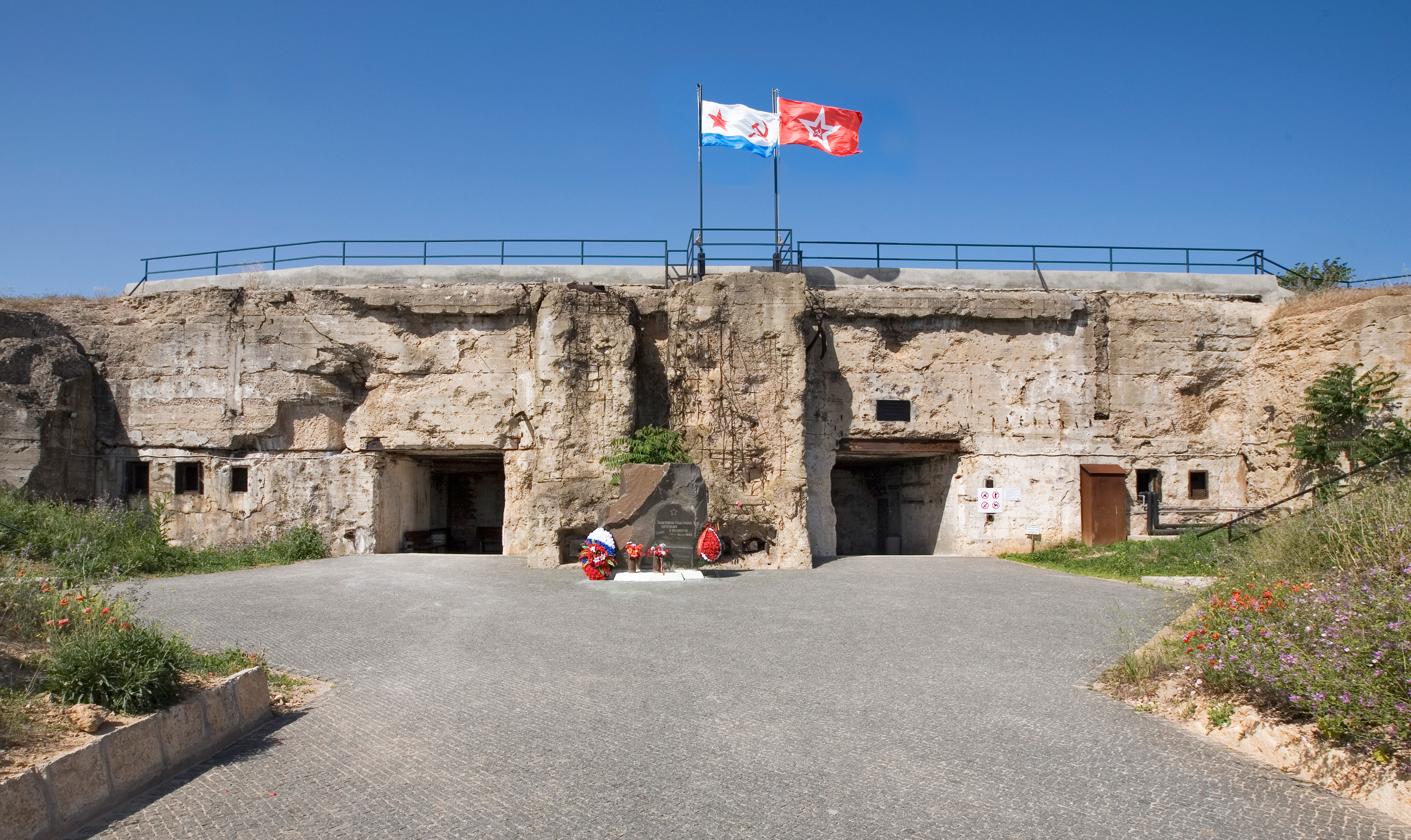
Armoured Coastal Battery #35, Morgunov's command in the early 1930s

Morgunov was born on 25 January 1902 in Moscow, Russian Empire, into the family of a worker at the Dynamo Plant. Morgunov also worked at the Dynamo Plant for a time, before joining the Red Army ranks after the October Revolution in 1917. He took part in the storming of the Kremlin, and went on to see action in the Russian Civil War near Oryol, and in the Crimea and around Sevastopol. He completed the Odessa Artillery Courses in 1921, and was appointed platoon commander of one of the coastal batteries. He continued to specialise in shore-based gunnery, graduating from the Higher Courses of Special Purpose Artillery in 1925, and then from the Higher Special Courses of the Naval Academy. In the early 1930s he was placed in command of Armoured Coastal Battery #35, and then assistant commandant of the Crimean fortified area in February 1937. In June 1939, he was assigned the post of commandant of the Crimean Fortified Area, and then commanding officer of Coastal Defences and the main base of the Black Sea Fleet.

== Second World War ==
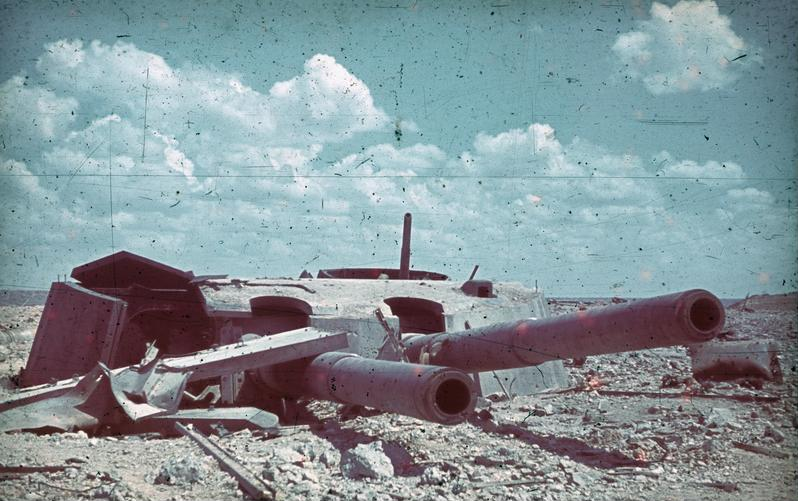
The remains of Armoured Coastal Battery #30 after its capture by German forces. Morgunov commanded the defensive fire of coastal batteries during the defence of Sevastopol.

Following the Axis invasion of the Soviet Union in June 1941, enemy forces began approaching Sevastopol by land. Morgunov, promoted to major-general on 21 May 1941, oversaw the installation of naval guns by coastal defence artillerymen, and the preparing of three defensive lines. The siege of Sevastopol began in earnest in October, after attempts by German General Erich von Manstein to capture it on the move were frustrated. Initial German attacks were from the north by the 132nd Infantry Division, with the 50th Infantry Division coming up in support, seeking to encircle and bypass the city. They were opposed by the coastal defence batteries under Morgunov, buying time for the Separate Coastal Army to reach the city. On the arrival of reinforcements in November, Morgunov became deputy commander of the Sevastopol defensive region for coastal defence under the commander of the Black Sea Fleet Filipp Oktyabrsky, and a member of the City Defence Committee. He oversaw the formation of defensive units and the supply of equipment and materials to the troops. In winter of 1941, he was faced with the problem of having nothing to warm the troops in the trenches. Lacking stores of vodka, a million bottles of champagne from the city warehouses were instead distributed. The soldiers asked instead for vodka, arguing that "This fizzy stuff will only make you freeze!" The situation was somewhat alleviated with the discovery of several tons of raw alcohol in the navy warehouses.

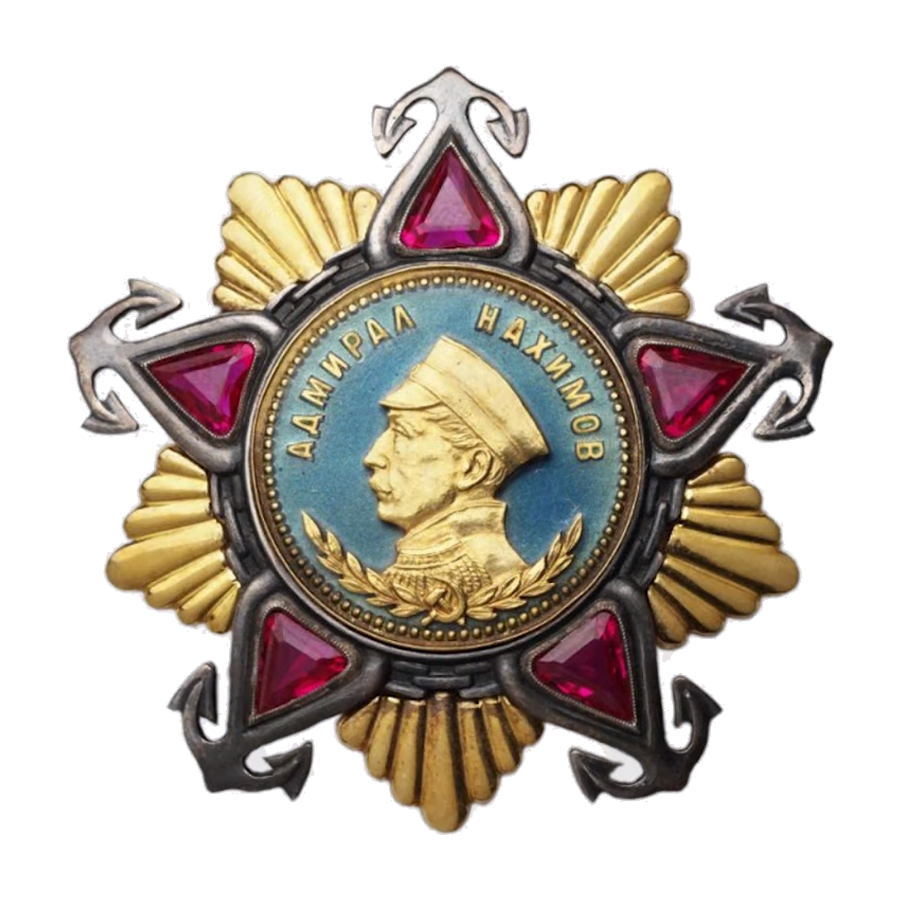
The Order of Nakhimov, 1st degree. Morgunov was the first person to receive this award, in May 1944.

The city held out for over eight months, finally being taken by Axis forces in July 1942. Morgunov was among those escaping the city before its fall, and in July he was appointed deputy commander of the Black Sea Fleet for ground forces. That autumn he took part in Vice-Admiral Sergei Stavitsky's commission studying the defence of Sevastopol, and in early 1943 he became chief of the Black Sea Fleet's coastal defence. Promoted to Lieutenant General of the Coastal Service on 10 April 1944, he took part in the recapture of Sevastopol in 1944 in the Crimean offensive. In May he was awarded the Order of Nakhimov, 1st degree, becoming the first of 82 people to receive this in the history of its award. Also in 1944, he was appointed a Commander of the Order of the British Empire.

== Post-war ==
Morgunov remained in service after the war, serving as commanding officer of the Black Sea Fleet Coastal Defences until July 1950, when he was appointed head of the Coastal Artillery, Naval Infantry and Ground Units Combat Training Directorate, of the Main Combat Training Directorate, of the Naval Staff. He was given the rank of lieutenant-general on 5 May 1952, and in August 1953, was appointed head of coastal defence for the entire Soviet Navy. He remained in service until 1955, when he retired due to illness. He wrote an account of the defence of Sevastopol, published as Heroic Sevastopol. Morgunov died in Moscow on 29 September 1985 and was buried in the Kuntsevo Cemetery.

== Awards and honours ==
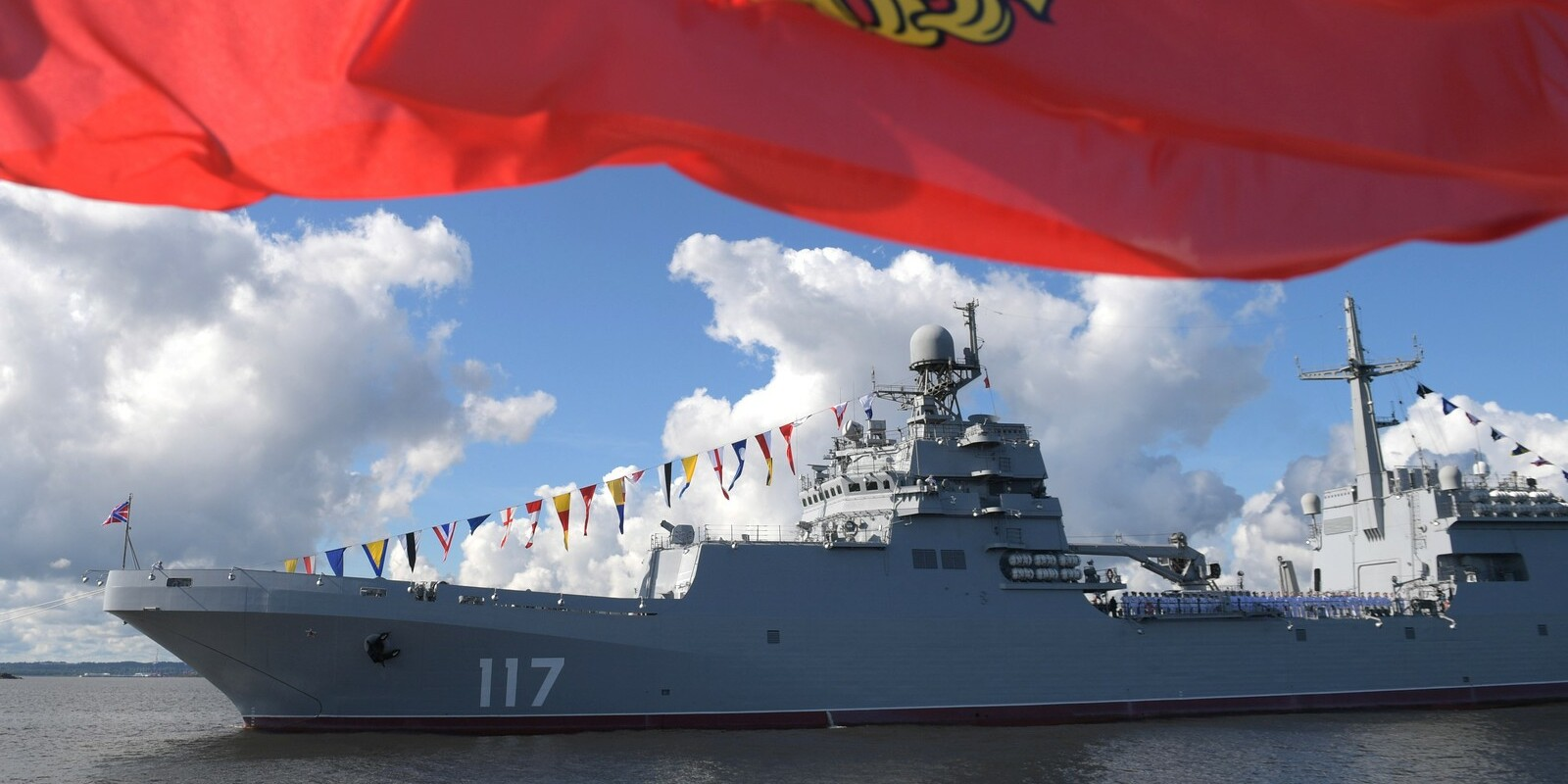
The Ivan Gren-class landing ship Pyotr Morgunov, named in Morgunov's honour

Over his career Morgunov was awarded the Order of Lenin, three Orders of the Red Banner, two Orders of the Red Star, the Orders of Nakhimov, and the Patriotic War First Classes, the Order "For Personal Courage", and various medals. He was also appointed a Commander of the Order of the British Empire in 1944.

There is a plaque on the house in Sevastopol where Morgunov lived, and a street in the city was named after him in 2008. In 1970, the Soviet film Sea on Fire was released, based partly on Morgunov's book. Morgunov was played by Konstantin Tyrtov in the film. In 2015 the Pyotr Morgunov, of the Ivan Gren-class landing ships built for the Russian Navy, was laid down. She was commissioned into service in 2020.
