= Magnetic self-protection =

Magnetic self-protection (MSP), also "mine protection" is an active measure to reduce the magnetic signature of a ship. This is needed so that the magnetic ignition mechanism of naval mines or torpedoes are not triggered.

The mere demagnetization is to be distinguished from that with which the permanent magnetic orientation of a metal hulk can be lifted with a strong magnetic field for some time.

== History ==
The first magnetic self-protection equipment was developed at the beginning of World War II because of the advent of magnetically detonated mines. This was initially a cable which was placed along the entire length to the hull of the vessel and the application of direct current produced a magnetic field that counteracted the magnetic field of the steel mass of the vessel.

During the Second World War these methods of mine protection were standard for all large battle ships. A simple magnetic coil, however, was no longer capable of adequately compensating for the increasingly sophisticated magneto ignition, for the non-uniform magnetic field of a ship and for the variable effects of the Earth's magnetic field in different regions of the world.

== Present ==
Modern MSP systems consist of a plurality of electromagnetic coils which suppress the magnetic signature in several directions. For that, the signature of the vessel is accurately measured under various conditions first, so that the signature of counteracting magnetic fields can be suitably generated. For the majority of the vessels of the German Navy, this is done in the two magnetic measurement and treatment centers in Wilhelmshaven and Kiel.

Not only must the uneven distribution of magnetic disturbances in the hull and the variable magnetic field in various areas of the world be taken into account, but also the movements of vessels (speed, rolling movements) or magnetic effects caused by units not constantly in use.

Accordingly, an MSP system today does not generate a static magnetic field any more, but a magnetic field which is tailored depending on the location and movement, as well as various internal processes of the ship.

In so-called highly protected vessels, such as anti-mine vessels or submarines that by construction already have a low magnetic signature, it can be almost completely eliminated with the aid of MSP systems. The German Navy maintains an Earth's magnetic field simulator for this purpose in the Borgsted narrows at Schirnau-Lehmbek, in which the MSP system is adjusted accordingly for the entire vessel in various operating states and for different measured latitudes.
