= Ivan Gren-class landing ship =

Russian Navy ship class

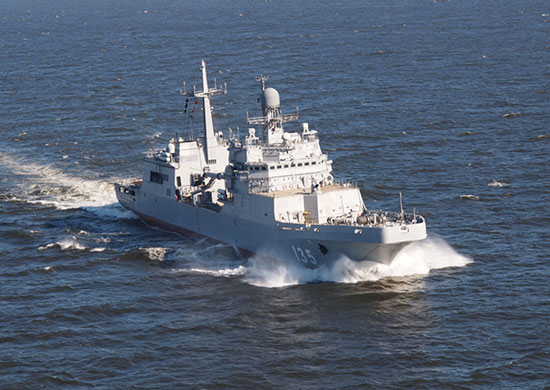
- Ivan Gren in June 2018

Class overview
- Name: Ivan Gren class
- Builders: Yantar Shipyard, Kaliningrad
- Operators: Russian Navy
- Preceded by: Ropucha class; Ivan Rogov class
- Built: 2004–present
- In service: 2018–present
- Planned: 11
- Building: 2
- Completed: 3
- Active: 2

General characteristics
- Type: Landing Ship, Tank
- Displacement: 6,600 tons full load (first two ships); up to 9,000+ tons (subsequent ships)
- Length: 135 m (442 ft 11 in) 160 m (524 ft 11 in) (subsequent ships)
- Beam: 16.5 m (54 ft 2 in)
- Propulsion: Kolomna 10D49 diesel engine
- Speed: 18 knots (33 km/h; 21 mph)
- Range: 3,500 nmi (6,500 km; 4,000 mi) at 16 knots (30 km/h; 18 mph)
- Capacity: 13 main battle tanks, 40 BTR or IFV and 300 troops; up to double lift capacity in units from Vladimir Andreyev onwards.
- Complement: ~100
- Armament: 1 × 30 mm AK-630M-2 gun; 2 × 30 mm AK-630 guns; 2 × 14.5 mm KPV type gun
- Aviation facilities: Hangar for 2 Ka-27 ASW or Ka-29 transport-attack helicopters on 117 and 135; hangar for 4 helicopters (including Ka-52 attack helicopters) on units from Vladimir Andreyev onwards

The Ivan Gren class, Russian designation Project 11711, is a class of large Landing Ship, Tank (LST) The class was to be composed of two vessels, Ivan Gren and Pyotr Morgunov, but later it was announced that the Russian Navy intends to acquire several more vessels of a modified design.

== Design and construction ==
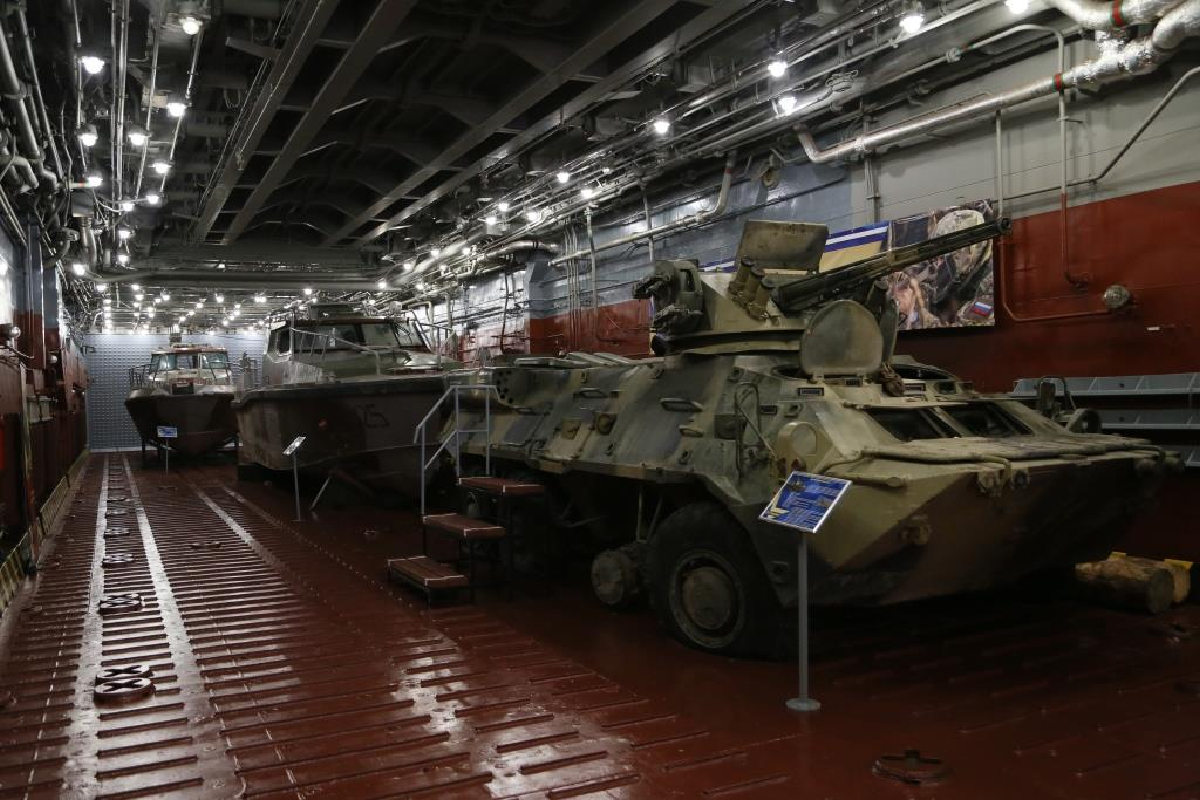
Ivan Gren landing ship deck.

The vessels of the class have a displacement of 5,000–6,000 tons and are able to carry up to 13 main battle tanks or 36 armoured personnel carriers and 300 marines. The first ship of the class, Ivan Gren, was laid down on 23 December 2004. The hull of Ivan Gren was completed by the end of November 2010. On 9 October 2010 a contract to increase work on the vessel was signed. The ship was launched on 18 May 2012 and was scheduled to be delivered to the Russian Navy by 2014. Delivery of Ivan Gren was delayed until 2015 while the second ship of the class, Pyotr Morgunov, was laid down in October 2014. Ivan Gren started her sea trials in June 2016 in the Baltic Sea. According to Russian sources, the delaying of commissioning of the lead ship was due to several design faults that includes hull stability and engine problems.

On 3 May 2018, the lead ship of the class, Ivan Gren, successfully completed her sea trials held in the Baltic Sea. The warship's systems and complexes were checked by the state acceptance commission of Russia's Defence Ministry. Ivan Gren was accepted into service on 20 June 2018.

Initially, there were no plans to build more ships following Pyotr Morgunov. However, in December 2018, it was reported by the head of Russia's United Shipbuilding Corporation that Russia plans to order additional two or three modified Ivan Gren-class landing ships. On 9 April 2019, Russian Defence Minister Sergey Shoygu announced two more Project 11711 landing ships will be laid down on 23 April 2019.

On 23 April 2019, two modified Project 11711 landing ships, Vladimir Andreyev and Vasily Trushin, were laid down during a ceremony at the Yantar Shipyard in Kaliningrad. The two new ships differ with modified superstructure, increased displacement, 16D49 engines, larger dimensions and one single superstructure and capability to carry the Kamov Ka-52K carrier-based attack helicopters. The displacement of the enlarged vessels is reported to be up to 40% heavier than the baseline version or as heavy as up to 9240 tons (though some sources suggest a displacement of only 7,000 to 8,000 tons) and the amphibious lift capacity has grown by 100% (to 26 tanks).

Pyotr Morgunov was commissioned on 23 December 2020. On 30 January 2021 she arrived at her permanent base in Severomorsk under the command of Captain 2nd rank Vyacheslav Solovyov.

From February 2022, Pyotr Morgunov was deployed in the Black Sea and participating in the Russian invasion of Ukraine.

On 25 December 2023, Russian President Vladimir Putin announced that seven more vessels are planned to be produced by 2035.

== Ships ==
Name	Namesake	Hull no.	Builders	Laid down	Launched	Commissioned	Fleet	Status
Ivan Gren	Vice Admiral Ivan Gren	135	Yantar Shipyard, Kaliningrad	23 December 2004	18 May 2012	20 June 2018	Northern	Active
Pyotr Morgunov	Major General Pyotr Morgunov	017 (117)	Yantar Shipyard, Kaliningrad	11 June 2015	25 May 2018	23 December 2020	Northern	Active
Vladimir Andreyev	Admiral Vladimir Andreyev		Yantar Shipyard, Kaliningrad	23 April 2019	30 May 2025		Pacific	Launched
Vasily Trushin	Major-General Vasily Trushin		Yantar Shipyard, Kaliningrad	23 April 2019	2025?		Pacific	Under construction
Sergei Kabanov	Lieutenant General Sergei Ivanovich Kabanov		Yantar Shipyard, Kaliningrad	8 July 2025				Under construction
			Yantar Shipyard, Kaliningrad	2025			Black Sea	Planned
TBA			Yantar Shipyard, Kaliningrad				TBD	Announced
TBA			Yantar Shipyard, Kaliningrad				TBD	Announced
TBA			Yantar Shipyard, Kaliningrad				TBD	Announced
TBA			Yantar Shipyard, Kaliningrad				TBD	Announced
TBA			Yantar Shipyard, Kaliningrad				TBD	Announced

== See also ==
- List of ships of the Russian Navy
- List of ships of Russia by project number

Equivalent landing ships of the same era

- Cheon Wang Bong class
- Bayraktar class
- Shardul class
- Type 072A (Batch 2)
- McClung class
