= Russian landing ship Ivan Gren =

Ivan Gren-class landing ship

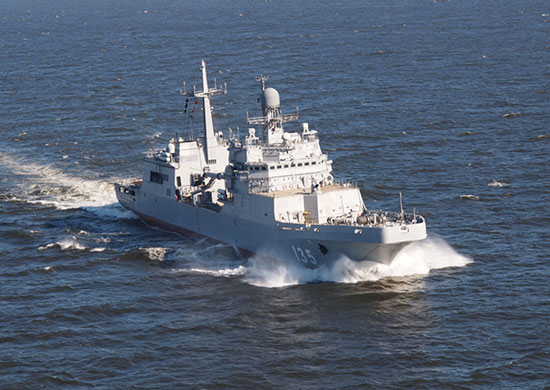

History

Russia
- Name: Ivan Gren
- Namesake: Ivan Gren
- Builder: Yantar Shipyard, Kaliningrad
- Laid down: 23 December 2004
- Launched: 18 May 2012
- Commissioned: 20 June 2018
- Status: Active

General characteristics
- Class & type: Ivan Gren-class landing ship
- Displacement: 6,600 tons full load
- Length: 135 m (442 ft 11 in)
- Beam: 16.5 m (54 ft 2 in)
- Propulsion: Kolomna 10D49 diesel engine
- Speed: 18 knots (33 km/h; 21 mph)
- Range: 3,500 nmi (6,500 km; 4,000 mi) at 16 knots (30 km/h; 18 mph)
- Capacity: 13 main battle tanks 40 BTR or IFV and 300 troops
- Complement: ~100
- Armament: 1 × 30 mm AK-630M-2 gun; 2 × 30 mm AK-630 guns; 2 × 14.5 mm KPV type gun
- Aviation facilities: Hangar for 2 Ka-27 ASW or Ka-29 transport-attack helicopters

Ivan Gren (Russian: Иван Грен) is an Ivan Gren-class Landing Ship, Tank (LST) of the Russian Navy, the lead ship of her class.

The first of the class to be ordered and built, Ivan Gren was laid down in 2004. Long delays resulted in her not being launched until 2012, and commissioned in 2018. She was assigned to the Northern Fleet's 121st Landing Ship Brigade. Following the Russian invasion of Ukraine, she has undertaken port visits in the Baltic Sea and Barents Sea displaying examples of captured and destroyed Ukrainian military equipment.

== Design ==
The Ivan Gren-class landing ships, designated Project 11711 by the Russian Navy, were designed by the Neva Design Bureau to replace the Soviet-era Ropucha and Tapir-class large landing ships. The ships, a development of the Project 1171 Tapir design, are intended to land troops and transport military equipment over a range of 4,000 nmi (7,400 km; 4,600 mi). The ships can carry up to 300 troops, or 13 tanks, or 35 armoured personnel carriers or infantry fighting vehicles. The ships also carry Ka-29 transport-attack helicopters.

== Construction and commissioning ==
Ivan Gren was laid down on 23 December 2004. The hull was completed by the end of November 2010. On 9 October 2010 a contract to increase work on the vessel was signed. The ship was launched on 18 May 2012 and was scheduled to be delivered to the Russian Navy by 2014. Delivery of Ivan Gren was at first delayed until 2015, attributed to several design faults including hull stability and engine problems, as well as repeated adjustments made to the technical specifications. She began sea trials in the Baltic Sea on 17 June 2016. On 29 August 2016, while undergoing trials in the Gulf of Finland, she came to the assistance of a civilian boat in bad weather. Sheltering the boat in the ship's wake, the Ivan Gren escorted it to calmer waters off Zelenogorsk and handed it over to units of the Ministry of Emergency Situations. After completing a first round of trials, Ivan Gren returned to the shipyard for further work, with another round of sea trials held in 2017. Continued problems and work to rectify them and then test fixes further delayed completion, with state acceptance trials started in November 2017, but then suspended for further work in late December. A specially created expert commission of the Navy was convened in March 2018, state trials resumed on 3 April 2018, and the acceptance certificate was finally signed on 2 June 2018. She was commissioned into service at Kaliningrad on 20 June at a ceremony presided over by Deputy Commander-in-Chief of the Navy for Armament Vice-Admiral Viktor Bursuk.

Over the extended period of her trials, Ivan Gren twice participated in Saint Petersburg's Navy Day parade in the Kronstadt roadstead.

== Service ==
On commissioning under her first commander, Captain 2nd rank Viktor Vasiliyev, Ivan Gren was assigned to the Northern Fleet's 121st Landing Ship Brigade. She arrived at her homeport of Severomorsk on 22 October 2018. She undertook naval exercises in the Barents Sea in April 2021.

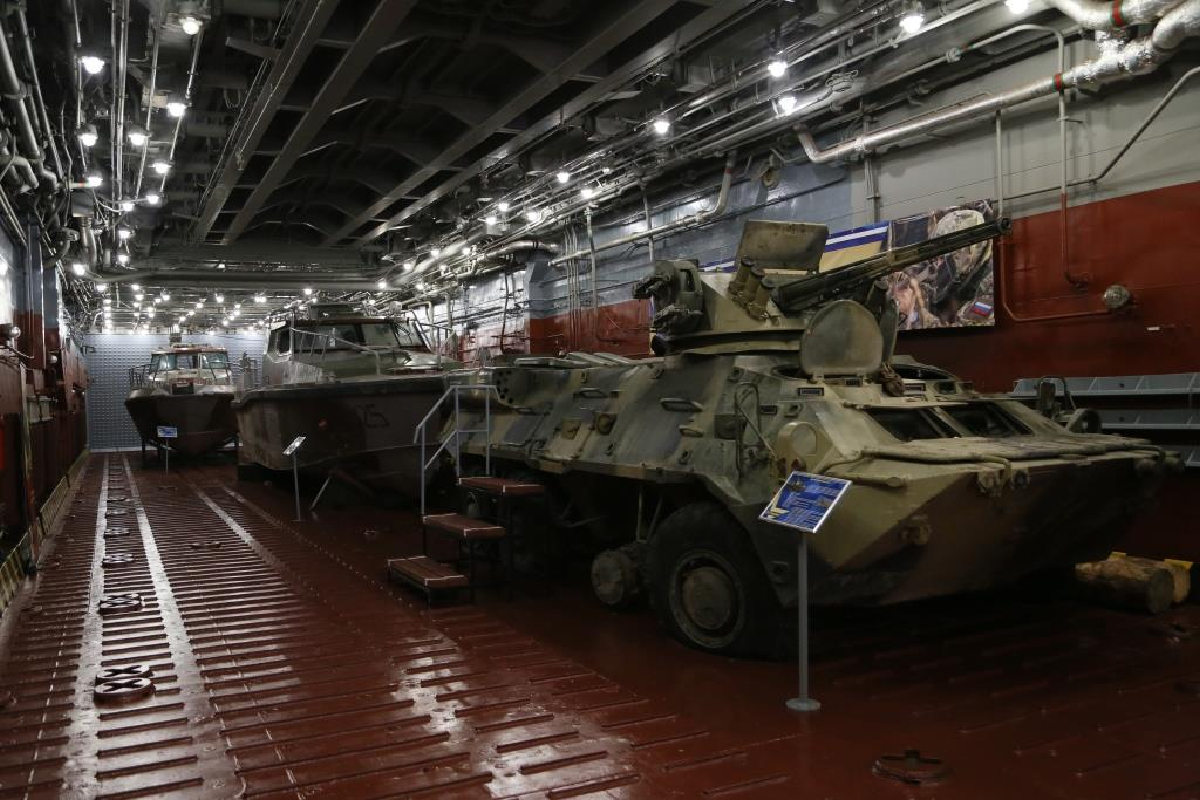
Captured Ukrainian military equipment in the well deck of the Ivan Gren, 2023, as part of the "Strength is in truth" exhibition.

Following the Russian invasion of Ukraine in 2022, the Ivan Gren, under the command of Captain 2nd rank Andrei Zharkov, began to be used to host travelling "Strength is in truth" exhibitions. The first was held in August and September 2022, with the ship touring Russian ports with exhibitions on military history, hosting performances, and offering opportunities to sign up for military youth organisations. The 2023 tour began on 12 August 2023, while she was moored at the Lieutenant Schmidt Embankment in Saint Petersburg. The exhibition displayed examples of captured Ukrainian military equipment. The exhibition was open until 21 September, with the ship moving to Baltiysk between 22 and 27 August, and then to Arkhangelsk and Murmansk in September.

In February 2024, Ivan Gren was deployed on exercises in the Barents Sea. In April 2024, Ivan Gren, the Ropucha-class Aleksandr Otrakovsky and the tanker Kola sailed to the Libyan port of Tobruk, delivering equipment for the Africa Corps deployment in the south of the country. The ships unloaded light and heavy vehicles such as pickups, GAZ and KAMAZ trucks, and ZU-23-2 anti-aircraft weaponry. The ships were monitored by ships of the Portuguese and Spanish Navies during their transit of their waters. Ivan Gren was subsequently expected to take part in the annual Navy Day celebrations in Saint Petersburg in July 2024, along with several other ships from the Northern Fleet. The Udaloy-class Admiral Levchenko and the Victor III-class submarine Tambov, escorted by the support vessel Nikolai Chiker, transited the Great Belt into the Baltic Sea on 6 June. Ivan Gren and the Ropucha-class Kondopoga followed on 7 June. The Admiral Levchenko, Tambov, and Ivan Gren left the Baltic on 14 June, before the Navy Day celebrations, and were observed returning to the Northern Fleet.

In December 2024, Ivan Gren and Aleksandr Otrakovsky were dispatched to the Russian naval installation at Tartus, Syria, to begin removing equipment following the Fall of the Assad regime, and transporting it to Libya. By mid-February the Ivan Gren and Aleksandr Otrakovsky were returning to the Baltic Sea, accompanied by merchant vessels used in the evacuation of Tartus, the Sparta, Sparta II, General Skobelev and the oiler Yelnya. They were shadowed during their passage through the English Channel by the Royal Navy vessels HMS Iron Duke, HMS Tyne, RFA Tideforce, and a Wildcat helicopter from 815 Naval Air Squadron.
