= Strength is in truth =

Russian catchphrase

"Strength is in truth" (Russian: сила в правде, romanized: sila v pravde) is a Russian catchphrase that has been widespread since the beginning of the 21st century. It is derived from the phrase of the character Danila Bagrov in the film Brother 2, released in 2000.

== History ==
Russian historiography considers the saying attributed to Alexander Nevsky: "God is not in might, but in truth!", which is also often mentioned in a later 18th-century reproduction by the Russian commander Alexander Suvorov.

The phrase "strength is in the truth" was uttered by the main character of the movie Brother 2 Danila Bagrov, released in 2000. In the film, the hero first asked his brother, "What is strength in, brother?" to which the brother replied that all strength is in money, and then, in one of the final dialogues, Bagrov uttered the words: "Tell me, American, what is strength in? Is it money? My brother says it's money, too. You got a lot of money, so what? I think strength is in the truth: Whoever has the truth is stronger".

== Linguistic analysis ==
Yuri Razinov, Doctor of Philological Sciences, writes that "the hero of the 'New Russian tale' Danila the Bogatyr from Aleksei Balabanov's film Brat-2' in a forceful manner instills in his overseas colleague that 'the power is in the truth'. And the power of truth, of course, is in its directness. Razinov believes that this asserts "the direct and obstinate style of Truth", which "turns out to be more powerful than the evasive and cunning manner of Injustice. ... The epic Justice interdicts, breaks and literally bends into an arc the crooked line of Injustice." Razinov believes that the paradox of Russian history is that the thesis that "strength is in truth" exists in words, while in fact recognizes the opposite order to it, "who has strength, he has truth".

== In politics ==
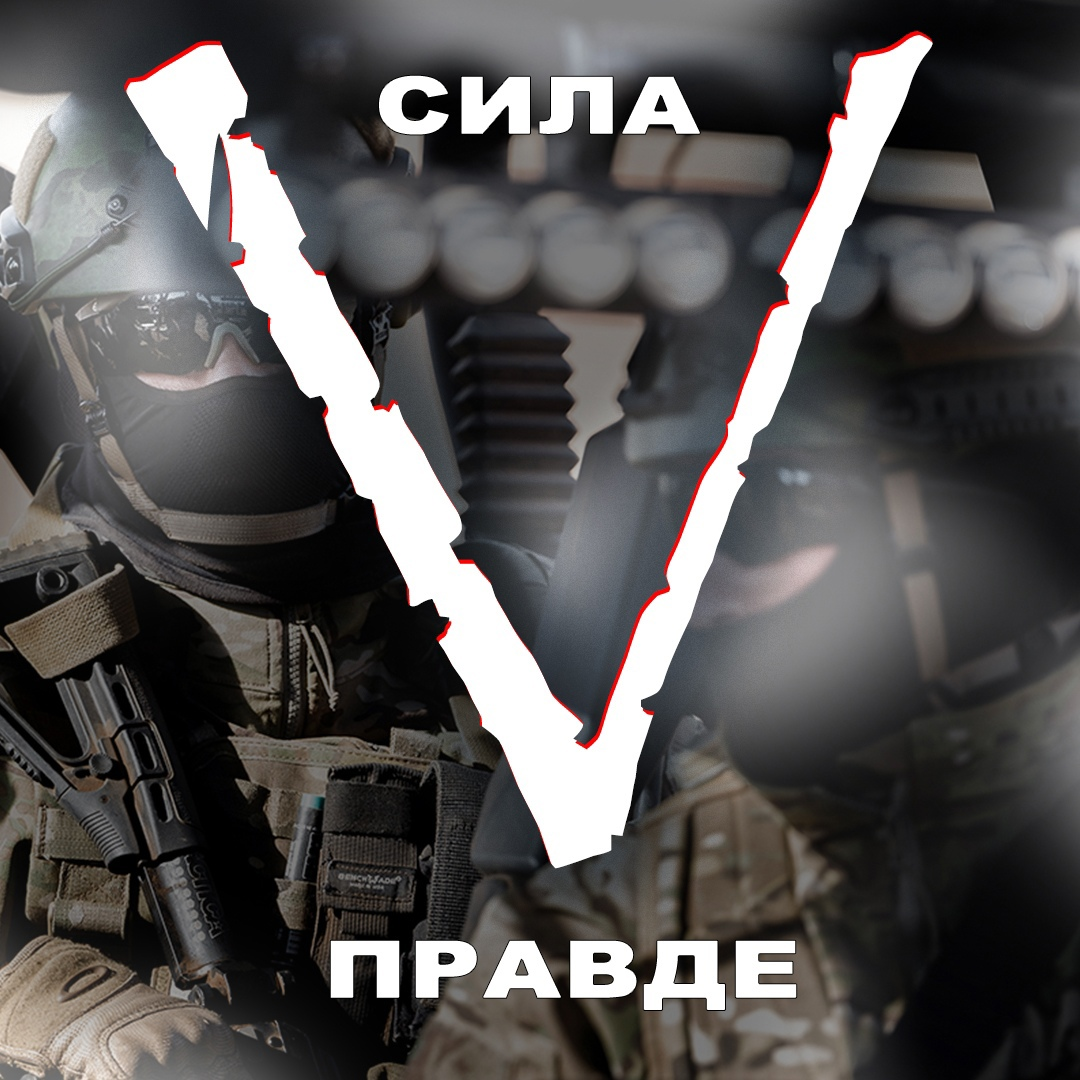
Russian Ministry of Defence propaganda poster featuring the "V" symbol in the motto "strength is in truth"

The Right Cause party used a phrase from the film Brother 2 as the political slogan of the party: "The strength is in the truth. He who is right is stronger".

The Communist Party of the Russian Federation (CPRF) used the slogan "Our strength is in the truth!" (Наша сила — в правде).

=== 2022 Russian invasion of Ukraine ===
During the 2022 Russian invasion of Ukraine, the Latin letter "V" is one of the symbols Russia has chosen to promote the invasion of Ukraine, other symbols being "Z" among others. The Russian Ministry of Defence later stated on 3 March that "V" stood for "Our strength is in truth", as well as for "The task will be completed" (Russian: задача будет Vыполнена, romanized: zadacha budet Vypolnena).

== See also ==
- Z (military symbol)
- Soviet imagery during the Russo-Ukrainian War
- Ribbon of Saint George
