= Russian submarine Veliky Novgorod =

Kilo-class Russian Navy submarine

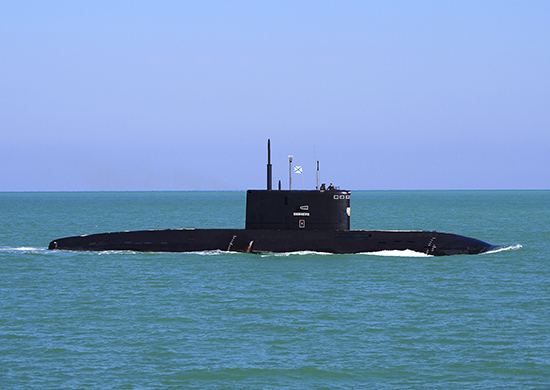
- Veliky Novgorod in 2021

History

Russia
- Name: Veliky Novgorod (B-268)
- Namesake: Veliky Novgorod
- Builder: Admiralty Shipyards
- Laid down: 30 October 2014
- Launched: 16 March 2016
- Commissioned: 26 October 2016
- Status: in active service

General characteristics
- Class & type: Kilo-class submarine
- Displacement: 2,350 t (2,310 long tons) surfaced; 3,100 t (3,100 long tons)
- Length: 74 m (242 ft 9 in)
- Beam: 9.9 m (32 ft 6 in)
- Draft: 6.1 m (20 ft 0 in)
- Propulsion: Diesel-electric propulsion; 2 × diesel generators; 1 × electric motor; 1 × shaft
- Endurance: 45 days
- Test depth: 300 m (980 ft)
- Complement: 52 officers and sailors
- Armament: 6 × 553 mm (21.8 in) torpedo tubes

Veliky Novgorod (B-268, Russian: Б-268 «Великий Новгород») is a Project 636.3 (NATO reporting name Improved Kilo II-class) diesel-electric attack submarine of the Russian Navy. It was laid down at the Admiralty Shipyards in Saint Petersburg on 30 October 2014, launched on 18 March 2016, and commissioned on 26 October 2016. Veliky Novgorod is assigned to the Black Sea Fleet.

Since entering service it has deployed as part of the Mediterranean Sea Task Force between 2017 and 2019 in support of the Russian intervention in the Syrian civil war. During the deployment Veliky Novgorod fired Kalibr cruise missiles at Islamic State and other targets in Syria from positions in the Mediterranean Sea. Since the start of the Russian invasion of Ukraine in 2022, Veliky Novgorod periodically goes out into the Black Sea to launch missiles at targets in Ukraine.

== Design ==
It was developed starting in 1974 by the Rubin Design Bureau as the Project 877 (NATO reporting name Kilo-class) diesel-electric attack submarine for the Soviet Navy. In the 1990s the original design received upgrades to its stealth, propulsion, and automation, becoming the Project 636 (Improved Kilo class). Beginning from 2010, further improvements led to the Project 636.3 (Improved Kilo II class). The Improved Kilo II has a displacement of 2,350 tonnes (2,310 long tons) while surfaced and 3,100 tonnes (3,100 long tons) while under water. It has a length of 74 metres (242 ft 9 in), a beam of 9.9 metres (32 ft 6 in), and a draft of 6.1 metres (20 ft 0 in).

With diesel-electric propulsion, its single propeller shaft is driven by an electric motor, powered by two diesel generators, which give it a speed of 17 kn (31 km/h; 20 mph) on the surface or 20 kn (37 km/h; 23 mph) submerged. The submarine has a crew of 52 officers and sailors and can stay at sea for 45 days. Its maximum diving depth is reported as 300 metres (984 ft 3 in). The armament consists of six 553 mm (21.8 in) torpedo tubes, which can launch torpedoes, naval mines, or missiles. Some Improved Kilo II submarines are armed with variants of the Kalibr cruise missile, being able to hold up to four of them. Alternatively, they can hold up to 18 torpedoes or 24 naval mines.

== History ==
Veliky Novgorod was laid down at the Admiralty Shipyards in Saint Petersburg on 30 October 2014, launched on 18 March 2016, and commissioned on 26 October 2016. It was part of the first batch of Improved Kilo II submarines, which were ordered for the Black Sea Fleet and formed the 4th Independent Submarine Brigade. In 2017, Veliky Novgorod was commanded by Captain 2nd rank Sergey Ryabishchenko. Despite its assignment in the Black Sea, it initially remained in the Baltic. Veliky Novgorod took part in the first Navy Day parade in Saint Petersburg on 30 July 2017 with about forty ships, including one other submarine of its type, Kolpino.

From August 2017 to March 2019, Veliky Novgorod was deployed in the Mediterranean Sea Task Force to support the Russian intervention in the Syrian civil war, along with Kolpino. In March 2019, Veliky Novgorod and Kolpino returned to their base in Crimea, being rotated out with Krasnodar and Stary Oskol. During the deployment they launched Kalibr cruise missiles against Islamic State targets in Syria multiple times, especially in 2017. On 14 September 2017, Veliky Novgorod and Kolpino launched Kalibr missiles at Islamic State targets in Deir ez-Zor Governorate while being in the eastern Mediterranean, 500 to 670 km away. On 22 September 2017, while submerged at sea, Veliky Novgorod launched missiles against Jabhat Al-Nusra in Idlib Governorate, at a distance of about 300 km, in response to members of that group attacking Russian Military Police in the Hama Governorate. On 5 October 2017 the two submarines launched missiles at terrorist command centers in the Mayadin District, Deir ez-Zor Governotate, while being at sea. On 31 October 2017, Veliky Novgorod launched missiles at Islamic State targets in Deir ez-Zor Governorate.

At the start of the Russian invasion of Ukraine in 2022, Veliky Novogorod was located in the Black Sea with three other boats of the independent submarine brigade. Two others, Novorossiysk and Stary Oskol, were on assignment in the Mediterranean when Turkey blocked access to the Bosphorus for military vessels. After another one of the four submarines, Rostov-na-Donu, was struck by a missile in September 2023 while undergoing maintenance in Sevastopol, in the spring of 2024 Veliky Novgorod, Kolpino, and Krasnodar were moved from Sevastopol to Novorossiysk. Since then they have periodically gone out to sea to fire Kalibr cruise missiles at targets in Ukraine.
