= Russian submarine Kolpino =

Kilo-class Russian Navy submarine

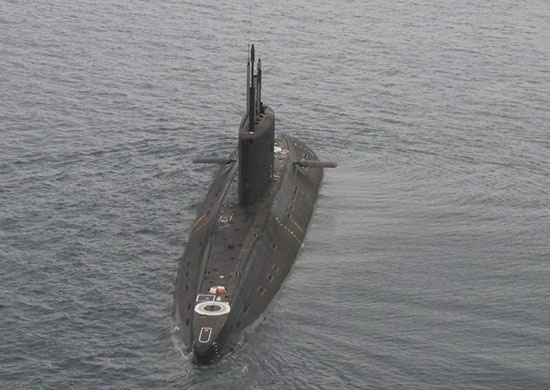
- Kolpino in 2019

History

Russia
- Name: Kolpino (B-271)
- Namesake: Kolpino
- Builder: Admiralty Shipyards
- Laid down: 30 October 2014
- Launched: 31 May 2016
- Commissioned: 24 November 2016
- Status: Damaged by underwater drone on 16 December 2025

General characteristics
- Class & type: Kilo-class submarine
- Displacement: 2,350 t (2,310 long tons) surfaced; 3,100 t (3,100 long tons)
- Length: 74 m (242 ft 9 in)
- Beam: 9.9 m (32 ft 6 in)
- Draft: 6.1 m (20 ft 0 in)
- Propulsion: Diesel-electric propulsion; 2 × diesel generators; 1 × electric motor; 1 × shaft
- Endurance: 45 days
- Test depth: 300 m (980 ft)
- Complement: 52 officers and sailors
- Armament: 6 × 553 mm (21.8 in) torpedo tubes

Kolpino (B-271, Russian: Б-271 «Колпино») is a Project 636.3 (NATO reporting name Improved Kilo II-class) diesel-electric attack submarine of the Russian Navy. It was laid down on 30 October 2014, launched on 31 May 2016, and commissioned on 24 November 2016 for the Black Sea Fleet. Kolpino became part of a submarine brigade of six Improved Kilo II boats stationed at Novorossiysk.

Kolpino was rotated through the Mediterranean Sea Task Force between 2017 and 2019, during the Russian intervention in the Syrian civil war, where it fired Kalibr cruise missiles at Islamic State positions and command centers in Syria. It was in the Black Sea at the start of the Russian invasion of Ukraine in 2022, and has periodically gone out from its base Novorossiysk to fire missiles at targets inside Ukraine. While at port in Novorossiysk on 16 December 2025, the submarine was damaged by a Ukrainian Sub Sea Baby underwater drone.

== Design ==
It was developed starting in 1974 by the Rubin Design Bureau as the Project 877 (NATO reporting name Kilo-class) diesel-electric attack submarine for the Soviet Navy. In the 1990s the original design received upgrades to its stealth, propulsion, and automation, becoming the Project 636 (Improved Kilo class). Beginning from 2010, further improvements led to the Project 636.3 (Improved Kilo II class). The Improved Kilo II has a displacement of 2,350 tonnes (2,310 long tons) while surfaced and 3,100 tonnes (3,100 long tons) while under water. It has a length of 74 metres (242 ft 9 in), a beam of 9.9 metres (32 ft 6 in), and a draft of 6.1 metres (20 ft 0 in).

With diesel-electric propulsion, its single propeller shaft is driven by an electric motor, powered by two diesel generators, which give it a speed of 17 kn (31 km/h; 20 mph) on the surface or 20 kn (37 km/h; 23 mph) submerged. The submarine has a crew of 52 officers and sailors and can stay at sea for 45 days. Its maximum diving depth is reported as 300 metres (984 ft 3 in). The armament consists of six 553 mm (21.8 in) torpedo tubes, which can launch torpedoes, naval mines, or missiles. Some Improved Kilo II submarines are armed with variants of the Kalibr cruise missile, being able to hold up to four of them. Alternatively, they can hold up to 18 torpedoes or 24 naval mines.

== History ==
Kolpino was laid down on 30 October 2014 at the Admiralty Shipyards in Saint Petersburg along with its sister ship, Veliky Novgorod. Kolpino was launched on 31 May 2016, and was commissioned into the Russian Navy on 24 November 2016. It was the final boat of the first batch of six Improved Kilo II submarines, ordered for the Black Sea Fleet. The commissioning of Kolpino completed the 4th Independent Submarine Brigade stationed at Novorossiysk. Kolpino took part in the first Navy Day parade in Saint Petersburg on 30 July 2017 with about forty ships, including Veliky Novgorod.

Between August 2017 and April 2019 Kolpino was periodically sent to the Mediterranean Sea Task Force in support of the Russian intervention in the Syrian civil war, alongside Veliky Novogorod. During those years at least two Improved Kilo II submarines were always stationed there, and Kolpino with Veliky Novgorod carried out numerous missile strikes on targets in Syria. On 14 September 2017, Kolpino and Veliky Novgorod launched Kalibr missiles at Islamic State targets in Deir ez-Zor Governorate while submerged in the eastern Mediterranean, 500 to 670 kilometers away. On 5 October 2017 the two submarines launched missiles at terrorist command centers in the Mayadin District, Deir ez-Zor Governotate, while being at sea. On 3 November 2017 Kolpino and six Tupolev Tu-22M bombers of the Russian Aerospace Forces carried out a large airstrike on Islamic State positions in Abu Kamal, in support of a Syrian Arab Army operation led by General Suhayl al-Hasan. According to the Russian Ministry of Defence, at some point during the time it spent in the eastern Mediterranean, Kolpino also tracked the British Royal Navy submarine HMS Astute and pinged it with sonar. The British attack submarine tried several measures to lose the tracking by Kolpino and other Russian vessels, but Kolpino continued to track it. At the same time the Russian submarine was not found by any of the NATO surface ships that were in the area.

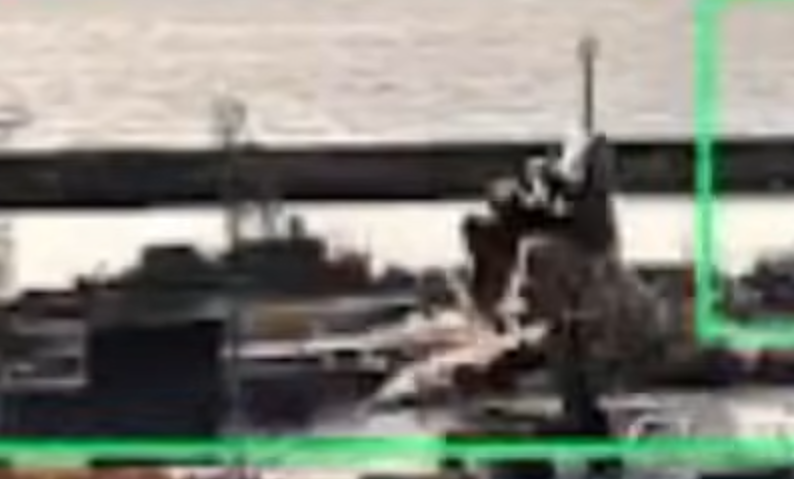
December 2025 explosion off the stern of Kolpino in the Port of Novorossiysk

At the start of the Russian invasion of Ukraine in 2022, Kolpino was located in the Black Sea with three other boats of the independent submarine brigade. Two others, Novorossiysk and Stary Oskol, were on assignment in the Mediterranean when Turkey blocked access to the Bosphorus for naval vessels. After another one of the four submarines, Rostov-na-Donu, was struck by a missile in September 2023 while undergoing maintenance in Sevastopol, in early 2024 Kolpino, Veliky Novgorod, and Krasnodar were moved from Sevastopol to Novorossiysk. Since then they have periodically gone out to sea to fire Kalibr cruise missiles at targets in Ukraine. On 15 December 2025, Kolpino was hit by a Ukrainian underwater drone, receiving extensive damage that OSINT analysts believe will require a long repair. The Russian Ministry of Defense denied that there had been damage. The UK Ministry of Defence considered it likely that the attack had significantly damaged the submarine, leaving it unable to deploy or sail of its own accord.
