= Russian submarine Stary Oskol =

Kilo-class Russian Navy submarine

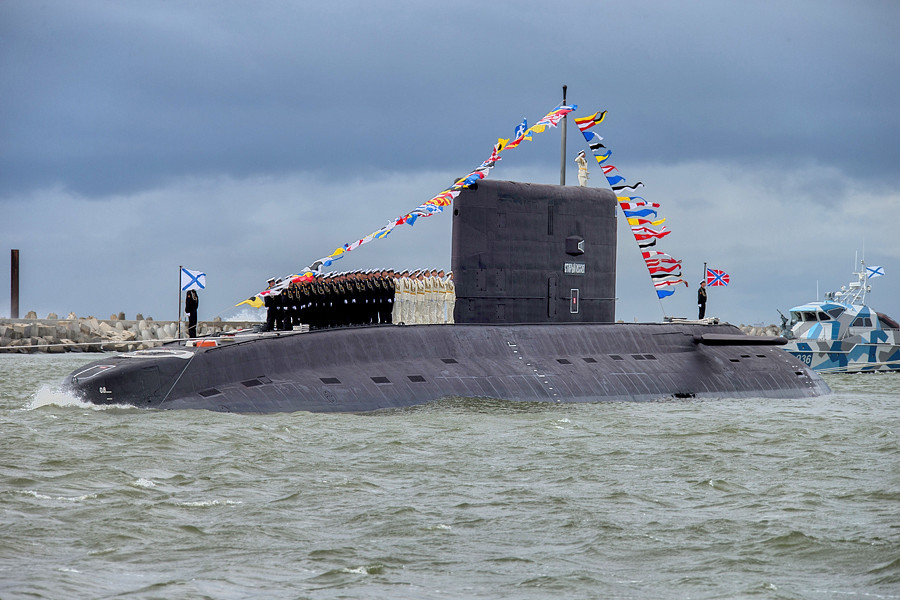
- Stary Oskol on Navy Day in July 2015

History

Russia
- Name: Stary Oskol (B-262)
- Namesake: Stary Oskol
- Builder: Admiralty Shipyards, Saint Petersburg
- Laid down: 17 August 2012
- Launched: 28 August 2014
- Commissioned: 3 July 2015
- Status: in active service

General characteristics
- Class & type: Kilo-class submarine
- Displacement: 2,350 t (2,310 long tons) surfaced; 3,100 t (3,100 long tons)
- Length: 74 m (242 ft 9 in)
- Beam: 9.9 m (32 ft 6 in)
- Draft: 6.1 m (20 ft 0 in)
- Propulsion: Diesel-electric propulsion; 2 × diesel generators; 1 × electric motor; 1 × shaft
- Endurance: 45 days
- Test depth: 300 m (980 ft)
- Complement: 52 officers and sailors
- Armament: 6 × 553 mm (21.8 in) torpedo tubes

Stary Oskol (B-262; Russian: Б-262 «Старый Оскол») is a Project 636.3 (NATO reporting name Improved Kilo II-class) diesel-electric attack submarine of the Russian Navy. It was laid down on 17 August 2012, launched on 28 August 2014, and commissioned on 3 July 2015.

Stary Oskol was deployed to the Mediterranean Sea Task Force from 2019 to 2020 in support of the Russian intervention in the Syrian civil war, before undergoing maintenance in Kronstadt. It was deployed in the Mediterranean again when the Russian invasion of Ukraine broke out in 2022, and was unable to return to the Black Sea after Turkey closed the Bosphorus to military vessels.

== Design ==
It was developed starting in 1974 by the Rubin Design Bureau as the Project 877 (NATO reporting name Kilo-class) diesel-electric attack submarine for the Soviet Navy. In the 1990s the original design received upgrades to its stealth, propulsion, and automation, becoming the Project 636 (Improved Kilo class). Beginning from 2010, further improvements led to the Project 636.3 (Improved Kilo II class). The Improved Kilo II has a displacement of 2,350 tonnes (2,310 long tons) while surfaced and 3,100 tonnes (3,100 long tons) while under water. It has a length of 74 metres (242 ft 9 in), a beam of 9.9 metres (32 ft 6 in), and a draft of 6.1 metres (20 ft 0 in).

With diesel-electric propulsion, its single propeller shaft is driven by an electric motor, powered by two diesel generators, which give it a speed of 17 kn (31 km/h; 20 mph) on the surface or 20 kn (37 km/h; 23 mph) submerged. The submarine has a crew of 52 officers and sailors and can stay at sea for 45 days. Its maximum diving depth is reported as 300 metres (984 ft 3 in). The armament consists of six 553 mm (21.8 in) torpedo tubes, which can launch torpedoes, naval mines, or missiles. Some Improved Kilo II submarines are armed with variants of the Kalibr cruise missile, being able to hold up to four of them. Alternatively, they can hold up to 18 torpedoes or 24 naval mines.

== History ==
Stary Oskol was laid down on 17 August 2012 at the Admiralty Shipyards in Saint Petersburg, launched on 28 August 2014, and commissioned into the Russian Navy on 3 July 2015. It was the third vessel in the first batch of six Improved Kilo II submarines, which were ordered for the Black Sea Fleet and formed its 4th Independent Submarine Brigade.

In October 2015 Stary Oskol arrived at Polyarny, Murmansk Oblast, the headquarters of the Northern Fleet, to undergo testing. After passing the testing with the Northern Fleet, Stary Oskol arrived at its permanent base in the Black Sea in June 2016. On its way through the English Channel, it was detected and followed by the British Royal Navy frigate HMS Kent (F78).

In March 2019 Stary Oskol and another boat of its class, Krasnodar, joined the Mediterranean Sea Task Force of the Russian Navy in support of the Russian intervention in the Syrian civil war, taking the place of Kolpino and Veliky Novgorod. As of April 2020 Stary Oskol was in Kronstadt to undergo maintenance. When the Russian invasion of Ukraine broke out in 2022, the submarine was in the Mediterranean again, along with Novorossiysk, and they were unable return to the Black Sea because Turkey closed the Bosphorus for military vessels.
