= Kolpino (disambiguation) =

Kolpino (Russian: Колпино) is the name of several inhabited localities in Russia.

Urban localities

- Kolpino, Saint Petersburg, a municipal city in Kolpinsky District of the federal city of Saint Petersburg

Rural localities

- Kolpino, Nevelsky District, Pskov Oblast, a village in Nevelsky District of Pskov Oblast
- Kolpino, Pechorsky District, Pskov Oblast, a village in Pechorsky District of Pskov Oblast
- Kolpino, Pustoshkinsky District, Pskov Oblast, a village in Pustoshkinsky District of Pskov Oblast
- Kolpino, Kardymovsky District, Smolensk Oblast, a village in Pervomayskoye Rural Settlement of Kardymovsky District in Smolensk Oblast
- Kolpino, Roslavlsky District, Smolensk Oblast, a village in Bogdanovskoye Rural Settlement of Roslavlsky District in Smolensk Oblast
- Kolpino, Krasnokholmsky District, Tver Oblast, a village in Likhachevskoye Rural Settlement of Krasnokholmsky District in Tver Oblast
- Kolpino, Penovsky District, Tver Oblast, a village in Voroshilovskoye Rural Settlement of Penovsky District in Tver Oblast
- Kolpino, Vologda Oblast, a village in Volodinsky Selsoviet of Babayevsky District in Vologda Oblast

Other

- Russian submarine Kolpino
