= Black Sea Fleet =

Russian naval unit

Russian Black Sea Fleet
- Черноморский флот
- Great emblem of the Black Sea fleet
- Active: 13 May 1783 – present
- Allegiance: Russian Empire (1783–1917); Soviet Russia (1918–1922); Soviet Union (1922–1991); Commonwealth of Independent States (1991–1992); Russian Federation (1992–present)
- Branch: Russian Navy
- Role: Naval warfare; Amphibious military operations; Combat patrols in the Black Sea and occupied Sea of Azov
- Size: See list: 25,000 personnel (including marines) (in 2014) * 7 diesel/electric submarines (SSKs - 1 badly damaged in 2023 & another possibly damaged in December 2025, 2 operating in the Mediterranean/Baltic, 3-4 (one 877 and two or three 636.3 Kilos) likely operational in the Black Sea as of end 2025 * c. 23 frigates, corvettes/large patrol vessels likely operational as of 2025 (of which 6 deployed in the Mediterranean/Baltic/Caspian; at least 4 major warships/corvettes reported sunk & 2+ badly damaged since 2022); * 4 major amphibious ships (+ 6 tasked to the Black Sea Fleet from the Northern & Baltic Fleets; at least 3 major amphibious vessels sunk and 2 badly damaged since 2022) * Other warships (mine countermeasures ships, smaller patrol vessels, landing craft) & numerous auxiliaires/support vessels also operational as of 2025
- Part of: Russian Armed Forces
- Garrison/HQ: Sevastopol (HQ), Feodosia (Crimea); Novorossiysk HQ, Tuapse, Temryuk (Krasnodar Krai); Taganrog (Rostov Oblast)
- Anniversaries: 13 May
- Engagements: See list: Russo-Turkish War (1787–1792); Battle of Tendra; Crimean War; Battle of Sinop; World War I; Battle of Cape Sarych; Russian Civil War; World War II; Crimean offensive; Russo-Georgian War; Russo-Ukrainian War; Russian invasion of Ukraine; Syrian civil war

Commanders
- Current commander: Adm. Sergei Pinchuk
- Notable commanders: See list: Grigory Potemkin; Adm. Fyodor Ushakov; Adm. Alexander Menshikov; Adm. Pavel Nakhimov; Adm. Yevgeni Alekseyev; Adm. Andrey Ehbergard; Adm. Alexander Kolchak; Adm. Ivan Yumashev; Adm. Filipp Oktyabrskiy; Adm. Lev Vladimirsky; Fleet Adm. Sergey Gorshkov; Fleet Adm. Vladimir Kasatonov; Adm. Vladimir Masorin

The Black Sea Fleet (Russian: Черноморский флот, romanized: Chernomorskiy flot) is the fleet of the Russian Navy in the Black Sea, the Sea of Azov and the Mediterranean Sea. The Black Sea Fleet, along with other Russian ground and air forces on the Crimean Peninsula, were formally subordinate to the Southern Military District of the Russian Armed Forces. However, under command changes made in 2024, all Russian fleets were placed under the authority of the Russian Navy general command, no longer falling under the regional military districts.

The fleet traces its history to its founding by Prince Potemkin on 13 May 1783 as part of the Imperial Russian Navy. The Russian SFSR inherited the fleet in 1918; with the founding of the Soviet Union in 1922, it became part of the Soviet Navy. Following the collapse of the Soviet Union in 1991, the Black Sea Fleet was partitioned between the Russian Federation and Ukraine in 1997, with Russia receiving title to 82% of the vessels.

The Black Sea Fleet has its official primary headquarters and facilities at the Sevastopol Naval Base, Crimea, which Russia annexed from Ukraine in 2014. The rest of the fleet's facilities are based in locations on the Black Sea and the Sea of Azov, including Krasnodar Krai, Rostov Oblast and Crimea.

The ongoing Russo-Ukrainian War led to major operations and losses due to Ukrainian missiles and unmanned surface vehicles including the flagship Moskva and several landing vessels. Additionally, there was a 2023 Ukrainian missile strike against the Black Sea Fleet HQ in Sevastopol itself. After another attack on 24 March 2024, a Ukraine spokesperson said that they had disabled or damaged one third of the fleet during the war. In June 2024, Ukraine claimed it was now highly likely that they had destroyed all of the Black Sea Fleet's missile carrier capability based in Crimea. By early 2026, it was reported that, despite no longer having a navy, Ukraine's surface, sub-surface and aerial drone capabilities had effectively driven the Russian fleet from open waters, forcing it to seek shelter in ports on the eastern Black Sea that themselves were no longer fully secure.

== History ==
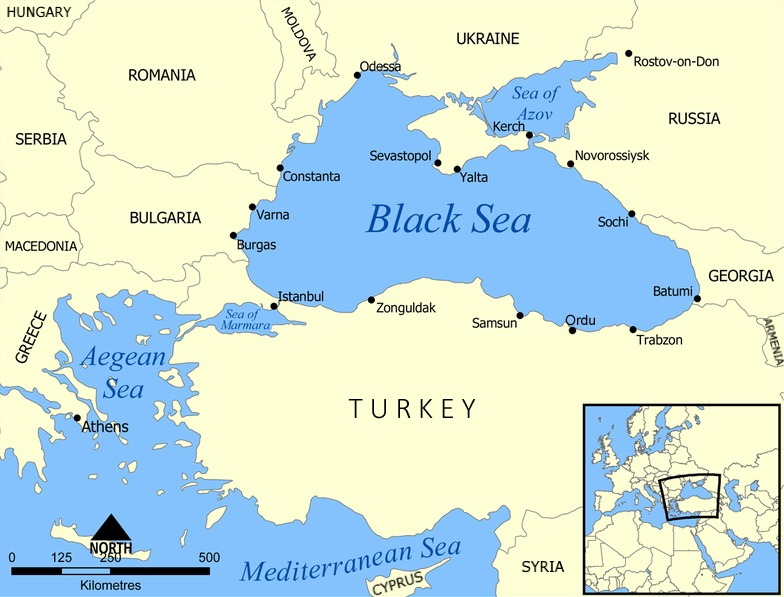
The Black Sea

=== Imperial Russian Navy ===
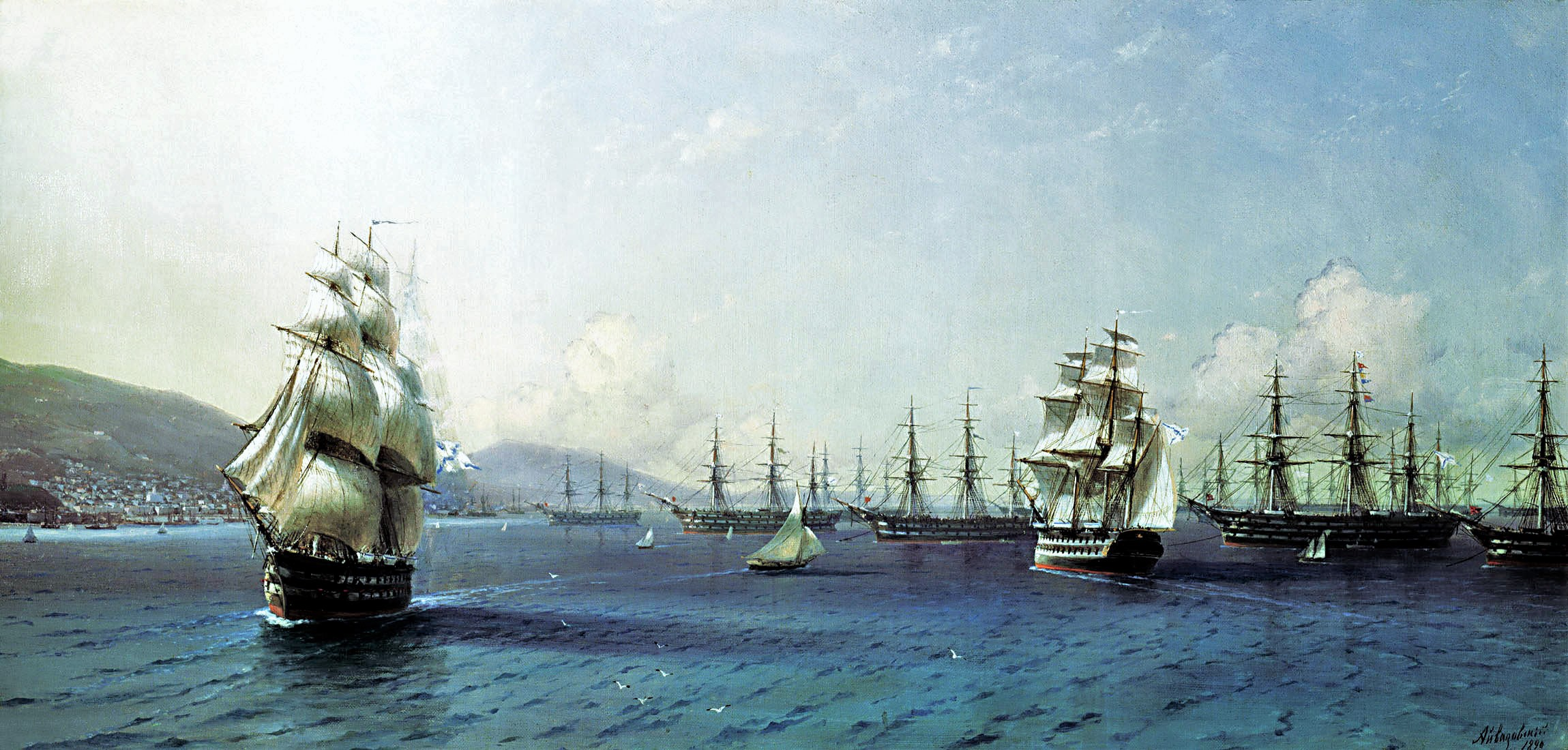
Ivan Aivazovsky. Black Sea Fleet in the Bay of Theodosia, Crimea, just before the Crimean War

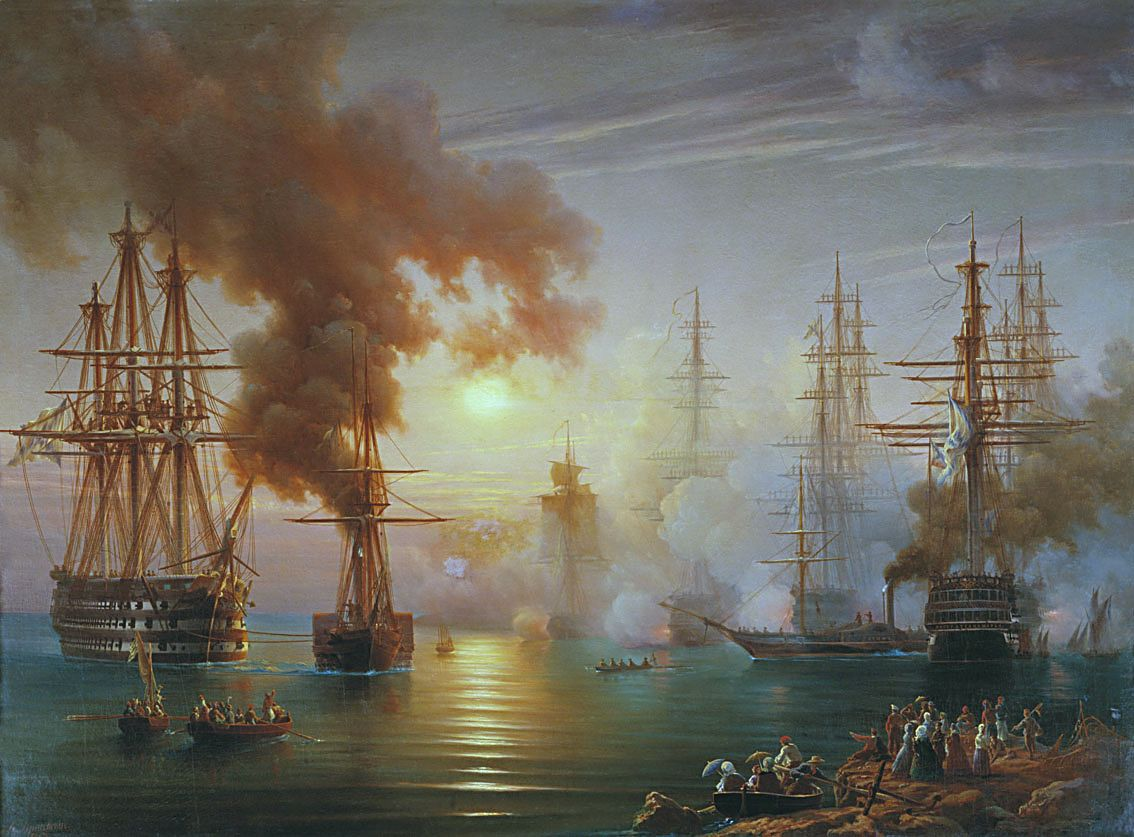
The Russian Black Sea Fleet after the Battle of Sinope, 1853

==== Origins ====
During the reign of Peter the Great, Russia attempted to expand to the Black Sea region and Peter established a naval base on the Sea of Azov during the Russo-Turkish War of 1695-96. However, these gains at the expense of the Turks were made vulnerable during the Great Northern War (1700-1721) with Sweden. In the subsequent Russo-Turkish War of 1710 to 1713, Peter was compelled to surrender what he had gained before. The resurgence of Russia's position in the south advanced marginally as a result of the Russo-Turkish War of 1735 to 1739, and then accelerated markedly during the reign of Catherine the Great (1762-1796). Catherine's Greek Project envisaged the ultimate partition of the Ottoman Empire between Russia and the Habsburg Empire and the restoration of the Byzantine Empire in Constantinople.

Starting with the Russo-Turkish War (1768–1774), Russia and the Ottoman Empire fought seven more wars up to the First World War (1914-1918). These conflicts encompassed which power would dominate the Black Sea region.

==== Formation of the fleet and operations in the late 18th/early 19th centuries ====
The Black Sea Fleet is considered to have been founded by Prince Potemkin on 13 May 1783, together with its principal base, the city of Sevastopol. Formerly commanded by admirals such as Dmitry Senyavin and Pavel Nakhimov, it is a fleet of great historical and political importance for Russia. During the Russo-Turkish War of 1787–1792 Russian control over Crimea was confirmed and Russian naval forces under the command of Admiral Fyodor Ushakov defeated the Turkish fleet at the Battle of Kerch Strait in 1790, preventing the Turks from landing a force in Crimea; while Ushakov's victory at Tendra allowed the Russians to begin the siege of Izmail, a potent Ottoman stronghold by the Black Sea, which was twice besieged without effect.

During the French Revolutionary Wars, the Black Sea Fleet was initially deployed under the command of Admiral Ushakov, in conjunction with the Turks, against French forces during the Siege of Corfu. The victory led to the establishment of the Septinsular Republic with the island of Corfu then serving as a base for Russian naval units in the Mediterranean operating against the French.

Turkey, encouraged by the French, went to war with Russia in the Russo-Turkish War of 1806–1812. The Russian fleet (deploying from the Baltic, but joining some vessels of the Black Sea Fleet already in the Mediterranean prior to the outbreak of war) under the command of Admiral Dmitry Senyavin played an instrumental role in this conflict securing victories at both the Battle of the Dardanelles (1807) and the Battle of Athos. After the conclusion of the Napoleonic Wars, the Russians, together with the British and French, intervened in the Greek War of Independence defeating the Turkish fleet at the Battle of Navarino in 1827 and helping to secure Greek independence (though once again, the Russian fleet was compelled to deploy from the Baltic). Turkish closure of the Dardanelles Straits then sparked a renewed Russo-Turkish conflict from 1828 to 1829 which led to the Russians gaining further territory along the eastern Black Sea.

The restriction imposed on the Black Sea Fleet by Turkish control of the Straits was influential in motivating periodic Russian attempts to secure control of the passage, which became a recurrent theme in Russian policy. From 1841 onward, the Russian fleet was formally confined to the Black Sea by the London Straits Convention.

==== Crimean War ====
In 1853, the Black Sea Fleet destroyed Turkish naval forces at the Battle of Sinop after the Turks had declared war on Russia. Nevertheless, during the ensuing Crimean War, the Russians were placed on the defensive and the allies were able to land their forces in Crimea and, ultimately, capture Sevastopol.

As a result of the Crimean War, the 1856 Treaty of Paris prohibited Russian naval units and fortifications on the Black Sea and neutralized the Black Sea.

==== 1877 conflict with Turkey ====
In 1870 Russia had repudiated the limitations imposed on its navy in the Treaty of Paris. However, when the Russo-Turkish War of 1877–1878 began, Russian naval forces in the region remained weak. While the fleet possessed a number of ironclads, their seaworthiness was poor and, together with the employment of mines, they were used largely for defence against a more powerful Turkish fleet. According to analysis by Alfred Brainard, during "The lack of an effective Russian navy on the Black Sea dominated the Russian strategy in the Balkans throughout the war". In the aftermath of the conflict, Russia moved to reconstitute its naval strength and fortifications in the Black Sea so as to avoid facing similar vulnerability in the future.

Despite having emerged victorious in the war with Turkey, through the 1878 Treaty of Berlin the other Great Powers limited the scope of Russia's victory. Notably, the Treaty reaffirmed that warships could not pass through the Turkish Straits in peacetime thereby effectively confining Russia's Black Sea Fleet to that body of water.

==== 1905 revolution ====
The Black Sea Fleet would play an instrumental political role in the 1905 Russian Revolution with the crew of the battleship Potemkin revolting in 1905 soon after the Navy's defeat in the Russo-Japanese War. The revolt acquired a symbolic character in the lead up to the Russian Revolutions of 1917 and after, as portrayed in the 1925 film by Sergei Eisenstein, Battleship Potemkin. Lenin referred to the Potemkin uprising as “the dress rehearsal” for the 1917 Revolution.

==== World War I and Russian Civil War ====
Turkey entered the First World War on the side of the Central Powers in October 1914 with a major naval attack against Russia's Black Sea ports. Vessels of the Ottoman Navy were accompanied by the German battlecruiser SMS Goeben and the light cruiser SMS Breslau, ships of the Imperial German Navy that had been caught in the Mediterranean at the outbreak of war in August, but had taken refuge in Turkey. These ships had now been integrated into the Ottoman Navy, albeit with their German crews still on board. The plan for the surprise attack on Russia had been formulated by Turkish War Minister Enver Pasha together with the commander of the two German ships, Admiral Wilhelm Souchon, and with the full knowledge of the German government.

While in the initial stages of the war, the Ottomans had the advantage due to the presence of the Goeben in Turkish waters, once two modern Russian dreadnoughts (Imperatritsa Mariya and Imperatritsa Ekaterina Velikaya) entered service with the Black Sea Fleet in 1915, the Russians gained the upper hand. The two sides would continue to trade surface raids, while German submarines of the Constantinople Flotilla and Turkish light forces raided and harassed Russian shipping.

As part of allied war aims, in 1915 Britain and France agreed that at the conclusion of the war the Turkish Straits would be placed under Russian control. These objectives were, however, not be realized once the Bolsheviks withdrew Russia from the war and were compelled to make a separate peace with the Central Powers in 1918.

The Russian loss of the dreadnought Imperatritsa Maria in late 1916 constituted a serious blow to the Black Sea Fleet, while Romania's entry into the war in the same year had shifted the focus of the Fleet from supporting Russian operations in the eastern Black Sea to assisting in the effort of countering German and Austrian forces as they advanced on the western side of the Sea. Then, with the onset of the Russian Revolutions in 1917, the cohesion and effectiveness of the Black Sea Fleet began to collapse. The Treaty of Brest Litovsk brought an end to hostilities between the Central Powers and Russia in March 1918 with harsh terms for Russia.

In 1918, some elements of the fleet were interned by the Central Powers as a result of their advance into South Russia. In the April Crimea operation, the goal of both Ukrainians and Germans was to get control over the Black Sea Fleet, anchored in Sevastopol. Former Chief of Staff Mikhail Sablin raised the colours of the Ukrainian National Republic on 29 April 1918, and moved a portion of the Ukrainian fleet (two battleships and fourteen destroyers) to Novorossiysk in order to save it from capture by the Germans.

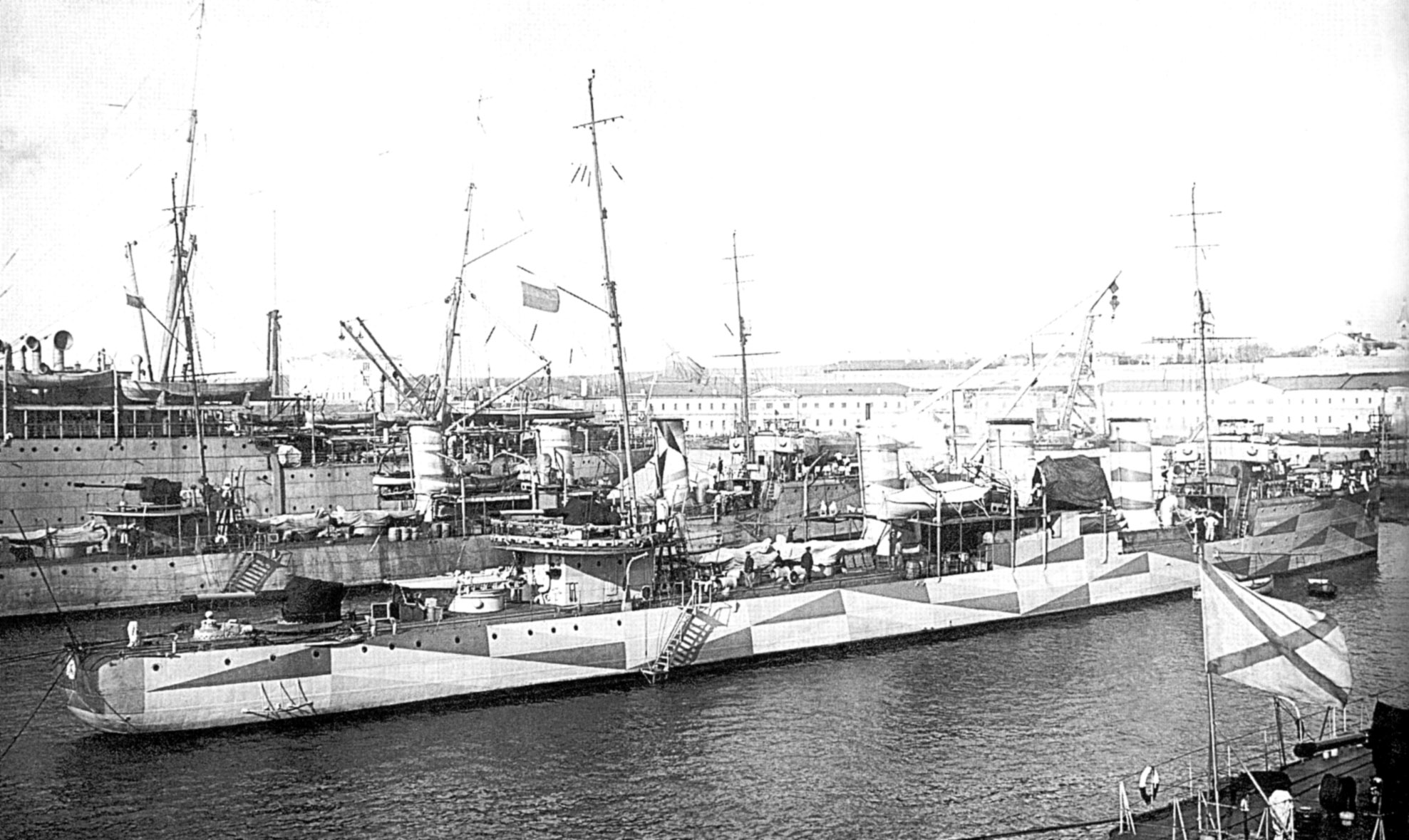
The Russian Black Sea Fleet in Sevastopol, c. 1916

Pursuant to the official acquiesence of Bolshevik authorities to the German demand that the fleet return to its base in Sevastopol, Soviet authorities nevertheless secretly ordered the fleet to scuttle its ships. However, the ultimate fate of each ship was effectively decided by their crews. As a result, while one battleship, one cruiser and six destroyers reportedly returned to Sevastopol, the rest were scuttled by their crews.

In 1919, following the collapse of the Central Powers' occupation in Western Russia, the Red Fleet of Ukraine was established out of certain remnants of the Russian Imperial Fleet. However, subsequently these elements were either scuttled or captured by the Western Allies. During the ensuing Russian Civil War, the chaotic political and strategic situation in southern Russia permitted the intervening Western allies to occupy Odessa, Sevastopol and other centres with relative ease.

Most of the ships of the Black Sea Fleet became part of the "Russian Squadron" of Wrangel's armed forces. Following the defeat of anti-Bolshevik forces and the evacuation of Crimea by White forces in 1920, the fleet itself sailed to Constantinople together with 126 ships of all types, carrying 150,000 refugees. Out of the former ships of the Black Sea Fleet, some passed to the French Navy while others were sold as scrap.

=== Soviet Navy ===
With the defeat of the anti-Bolshevik Armed Forces of South Russia, the Soviet government took control of all naval elements. The few ships that remained in the Black Sea were scrapped in the 1920s and a large scale new construction programme began in the 1930s. Initially the focus was defensive, focusing on the construction of large numbers of smaller submarines. However, from about 1935 the Soviet building program also began more systematically to incorporate larger vessels, including cruisers and destroyers.

Diplomatically, through the Montreaux Convention of 1936, the Soviet Union was able to secure a peacetime ability for Black Sea Fleet ships to transit the Turkish Straits. The agreement allowed the warships of Black Sea littoral states to transit the straits while imposing certain limitations on all navies, in particular on those of non-littoral states.

Like all elements in Soviet society, the navy was decimated by the Stalin purges of the 1930s. At least 30 percent of the Soviet Army and Navy officer corps, including three of the four fleet commanders, were arrested and shot or sent to the gulags. These included several active and former commanders of the Black Sea Fleet (including Admirals Eduard Pantserzhanskiy, Vladimir Mitrofanovich Orlov, Mikhail Viktorov, Ivan Kuz'mich Kozhanovand and Petr Ivanovich Smirnov-Svetlovskiy, all of whom were shot). The purges are said to have "had a catastrophic effect on the Red Army’s ability to perform in the early stages of World War II".

The Black Sea Fleet was commanded by Vice Admiral Filipp Oktyabrskiy on the outbreak of war with Germany in June 1941.

==== World War II ====
During World War II despite the scale of the German/Axis advance in southern Russia, and the capture of Crimea by Axis forces in mid-1942, the Fleet, though badly mauled, gave a creditable account of itself as it fought alongside the Red Army during the Siege of Odessa and the Battle of Sevastopol.

Soviet hospital ship Armenia was sunk on 7 November 1941 by German aircraft while evacuating civilians and wounded soldiers from Crimea. It has been estimated that approximately 5,000 to 7,000 people were killed during the sinking, making it one of the deadliest maritime disasters in history. There were only 8 survivors.

==== Cold War ====
With the end of World War II, the Soviet Union effectively dominated the Black Sea region. The Soviet Union controlled the entire north and east of the Black Sea while pro-Soviet regimes were installed in Romania and Bulgaria. As members of the Warsaw Pact, the Romanian and Bulgarian navies supplemented the strength of the Soviet Black Sea Fleet. Only Turkey remained outside the Soviet Black Sea security regime and the Soviets initially pressed for joint control of the Bosporus Straits with Turkey; a position which Turkey rejected.

In 1952, Turkey decided to join NATO, placing the Bosporus Straits in the Western sphere of influence. Nevertheless, the terms of the Montreux Convention limited NATO's options with respect to directly reinforcing Turkey's position in the Black Sea. The Soviets, in turn, had some of their naval options in the Mediterranean restricted by the Montreux Convention limitations.

In the later post-war period, along with the Northern Fleet, the Black Sea Fleet provided ships for the 5th Operational Squadron in the Mediterranean, which confronted the United States Navy during the Arab-Israeli wars, notably during the Yom Kippur War in 1973.

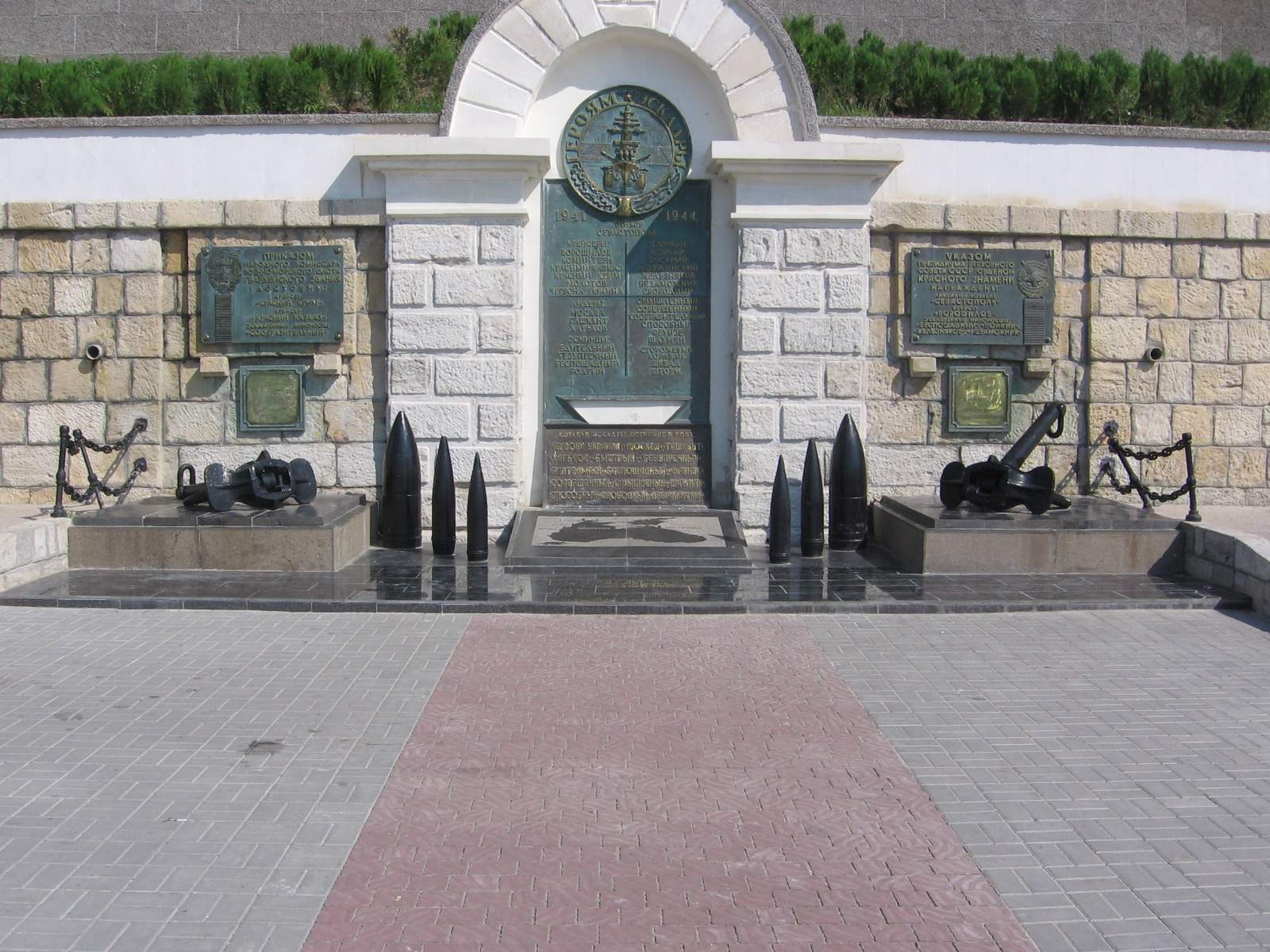
Monument to Heroes of the Soviet Black Sea Fleet Squadron 1941–1944 in Sevastopol, featuring the list of 28 military ships that distinguished themselves in battles with German invaders

In 1988 Coastal Troops and Naval Aviation units of the Black Sea Fleet included:

- Danube Flotilla:
  - 116th River Ship Brigade (Izmail, Odesa Oblast)
- 112th Reconnaissance Ship Brigade (Lake Donuzlav (Mirnyy), Crimean Oblast)
- 37th Rescue Ship Brigade (Sevastopol, Crimean Oblast)
- Marine and Coastal Defense Forces Department
  - 810th Naval Infantry Brigade (Sevastopol, Crimean Oblast)
  - 362nd independent Coastal Missile Regiment (Balaklava, Crimean Oblast)
  - 138th independent Coastal Missile Regiment (Chernomorsk, Crimean Oblast)
  - 417th independent Coastal Missile Regiment (Sevastopol, Crimean Oblast)
  - 51st independent Coastal Missile Regiment (Mekenzerye, Crimean Oblast)
- Naval Air Forces Department of the Black Sea Fleet
  - 2nd Guards Maritime Missile Aviation Division (Gvardeyskoye, Crimean Oblast)(three regiments of maritime attack Tu-22M2s
    - 5th Maritime Missile Aviation Regiment (Veseloye, Crimean Oblast) – disbanded 15.11.94.
    - 124th Maritime Missile Aviation Regiment (Gvardeskoye, Crimean Oblast) – disbanded 1993.
    - 943rd Maritime Missile Aviation Regiment (Oktyabrskoye) – disbanded 1996.
  - 30th independent Maritime Reconnaissance Aviation Regiment (Saki-Novofedorovka, Crimean Oblast)(Tu-22P)
  - 318th independent Anti-Submarine Aviation Regiment (Lake Donuzlav, Crimean Oblast)
  - 78th independent Shipborne Anti-Submarine Helicopter Regiment (Lake Donuzlav, Crimean Oblast)
  - 872nd independent Shipborne Anti-Submarine Helicopter Regiment (Kacha, Crimean Oblast)
  - 917th independent Transport Aviation Regiment (Kacha, Crimean Oblast)
  - 859th Training Center for Naval Aviation (Kacha, Crimean Oblast)

In 1989, the 126th Motor Rifle Division at Simferopol was transferred to the Black Sea Fleet from the Odesa Military District. Also that year, the 119th Fighter Aviation Division, with the 86th Guards, 161st, and 841st Guards Fighter Aviation Regiments, joined the Fleet from the 5th Air Army. The 86th Guards Fighter Aviation Regiment became part of the Moldovan Air Force upon the breakup of the Soviet Union. The 841st at Meria airport (between Poti and Batumi in the Adjar ASSR) (Georgian SSR) became the 841st independent Guards Anti-Submarine Helicopter Regiment in May 1991 and was disbanded in October 1992.

The 43rd Aviation Sevastopol Red Banner Order of Kutuzov Regiment of Fighter-Bombers, after being included in the Air Force of the Red Banner Black Sea Fleet on 1 December 1990, was renamed the 43rd Separate Naval Assault Aviation Sevastopol Red Banner Order of Kutuzov Regiment.

=== After the fall of the Soviet Union ===
With the fall of the Soviet Union and the demise of the Warsaw Pact, the military importance of the fleet was degraded and it suffered significant funding cuts and the loss of its major missions.

In the early 1990s the fleet had 645 ships and 72,000 personnel.

In 1992, the major part of the personnel, armaments and coastal facilities of the Fleet fell under formal jurisdiction of the newly independent Ukraine as they were situated on Ukrainian territory. Later, the Ukrainian government ordered the establishment of its own Ukrainian Navy based on the Black Sea Fleet; several ships and ground formations declared themselves Ukrainian.

However, this immediately led to conflicts with the majority of officers who appeared to be loyal to Russia. According to pro-Ukrainian sailors they were declared "drunkards and villains" and they and their families were harassed. They have also claimed that their names were branded "traitors to Russia" on local graffiti. Simultaneously, pro-Russian separatist groups became active in the local politics of Ukraine's Autonomous Republic of Crimea and the city of Sevastopol where the major naval bases were situated, and started coordinating their efforts with pro-Moscow seamen.

During this time the Georgian Civil War broke out. Fighting erupted between two separatist minorities of South Ossetia and Abkhazia supported by Russia on one side and the Georgian government led by Zviad Gamsakhurdia on the other. However, he was ousted during the so-called Tbilisi War in 1991. The new government continued the fighting against the break-away republics, but at the same time asked Russia's president Boris Yeltsin for support against the 'Zviadists' who were trying to regain power. This led to the Black Sea Fleet landing in Georgia (despite the unsettled dispute over ownership of the fleet), and resulted in the Battle of Poti.

==== Joint Fleet and its partition ====
Presidents Leonid Kuchma of Ukraine and Boris Yeltsin of Russia negotiated terms for dividing the fleet, and to ease the tensions, on 10 June 1995 the two governments signed an interim treaty, establishing a joint Russo-Ukrainian Black Sea Fleet under bilateral command (and Soviet Navy flag) until a full-scale partition agreement could be reached. Formally, the Fleet's Commander was to be appointed by a joint order of the two countries' presidents. However, Russia still dominated the Fleet unofficially, and a Russian admiral was appointed as Commander; the majority of the fleet personnel adopted Russian citizenship. Minor tensions between the Fleet and the new Ukrainian Navy (such as electricity cut-offs and sailors' street-fighting) continued.

In 1996 the 126th Motor Rifle Division was disestablished.

Moscow mayor Yury Luzhkov campaigned to annex the city of Sevastopol, which housed the fleet's headquarters and main naval base, and in December the Russian Federation Council officially endorsed the claim. Spurred by these territorial claims, Ukraine proposed a "special partnership" with NATO in January 1997.

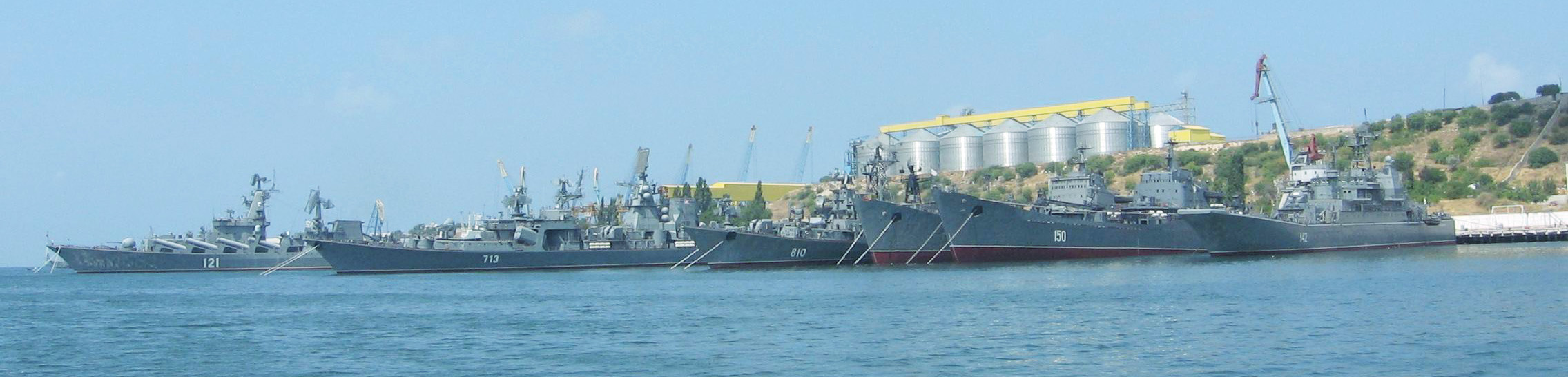
Some major ships of the Soviet and Russian Black Sea Fleet (including the flagship Moskva, far left) in Sevastopol, August 2007

On 28 May 1997, Russia and Ukraine signed several agreements regarding the fleet including the Partition Treaty, establishing two independent national fleets and dividing armaments and bases between them. Ukraine agreed to lease major parts of its facilities to the Russian Black Sea Fleet until 2017. However, permanent tensions on the lease details continued. The Fleet's main base was still situated in the Crimean port city of Sevastopol. In 2009 the Yushchenko Ukrainian government declared that the lease would not be extended and that the fleet would have to leave Sevastopol by 2017.

Due to the lack of fleet facilities in Russia, the former naval area at the Port of Novorossiysk was revived in September 1994, and officially reorganised as Novorossiysk Naval Base in 1997. The Russian Federation planned to house the headquarters and the bulk of the fleet there, and undertook a major upgrade of Novorossiysk military facilities starting in 2005 and finishing in 2022.

In April 2010 President Yanukovych renegotiated and extended the Russian leasehold until 2042 and an option for an additional five years until 2047 plus consideration of further renewals. This deal proved controversial in Ukraine. It appeared to violate the constitutional ban on basing foreign military forces, and would eventually lead to high treason charges.

In this regard, relations between Russia and Ukraine over the status of the Fleet continued to be strained. In an August 2009 letter to Russian President Medvedev, Ukrainian President Yushchenko complained about alleged "infringements of bilateral agreements and Ukrainian legislation"

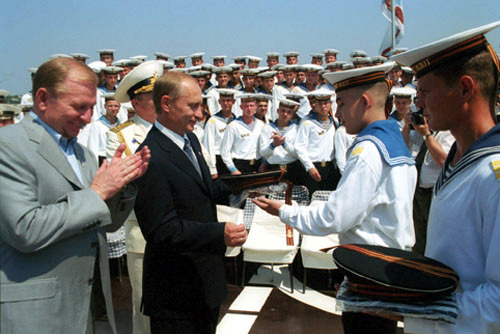
Vladimir Putin with Ukrainian President Leonid Kuchma on board the flagship Moskva, July 2001

In June 2009, the head of the Security Service of Ukraine said that after 13 December 2009, all officers from the Russian Federal Security Service (FSB) represented at the Black Sea Fleet would be required to leave Ukraine. From then, the Security Service of Ukraine would ensure the security of the Black Sea Fleet, including Russian sailors on Ukrainian territory. However, according to the Russian Foreign Ministry, employees of the FSB working at the Black Sea Fleet facilities were to remain on Ukrainian territory "in line with bilateral agreements". In 2010, based on an agreement between the Ukrainian and Russian governments, military counterintelligence officers from the Federal Security Service returned to the Black Sea Fleet base.

Despite these differences, joint exercises between the Ukrainian Navy and the Black Sea Fleet of Russia resumed with a command-staff exercise in June 2010 after a seven-year interval. In May 2011, Russia and Ukraine resumed their joint "Peace Fairway" (Farvater Mira) naval exercises.

==== Georgia in the Fleet partition ====
The newly independent nation of Georgia, which also hosted several bases of the Soviet Black Sea Fleet when it was the Georgian SSR, also claimed a share of the Fleet, including 32 naval vessels formerly stationed at Georgia's Black Sea port of Poti. Not a CIS member at that time, Georgia was not, however, included in the initial negotiations in January 1992. Additionally, some low-importance bases situated in the Russian-backed breakaway autonomy of Abkhazia soon escaped any Georgian control.

In 1996, Georgia resumed its demands, and the Russian refusal to allot Georgia a portion of the ex-Soviet navy became another bone of contention in the progressively deteriorating Georgian-Russian relations. This time, Ukraine endorsed Tbilisi's claims, turning over several patrol boats to the Georgian Navy and starting to train Georgian crews, but was unable to include in the final fleet deal a transfer of the formerly Poti-based vessels to Georgia. Later, the rest of the Georgian share was decided to be ceded to Russia in return for diminution of debt.

Russia employed part of the fleet during the 2008 Georgian conflict. Russian units operating off Abkhazia region resulted in a reported skirmish and sinking of a ship of the Georgian Navy. Since the 2008 South Ossetia war the Russian Black Sea Fleet has not taken part in any joint naval exercises involving Georgian warships. However, such a statement has little meaning since the Georgian Navy has ceased to exist (early 2009 it was merged with the Georgian coast guard).

==== Russo-Ukrainian War ====
===== Russian annexation of Crimea =====
The 2014 political crisis in Ukraine rapidly engulfed Crimea where pro-Russian separatist sentiment was strong. When the Russian Government determined to seize Crimea, specialist Russian military units appear to have played the central role. In March, the Ukrainians claimed that units of the 18th Motor Rifle Brigade, 31st Air Assault Brigade and 22nd Spetsnaz Brigade were deployed and operating in Crimea, instead of Black Sea Fleet personnel, which violated international agreements signed by Ukraine and Russia. Nevertheless, at minimum the Black Sea Fleet played a supporting role including with respect to preventing the departure of Ukrainian naval vessels from Crimea. Other sources suggested that the 810th Naval Infantry Brigade of the Fleet was also involved.

After the annexation of Crimea, the Ukrainian Armed Forces and the Ukrainian Navy were evicted from their bases and subsequently withdrew from the peninsula. During the occupation, Russian forces seized 54 out of 67 ships of the Ukrainian Navy. According to sources from Black Sea Fleet Headquarters, inspections of all ships were to be done by the end of 2014. On 8 April 2014 an agreement was reached between Russia and Ukraine to return Ukrainian Navy materials to Ukraine proper. The greater portion of the Ukrainian naval ships and vessels were then returned to Ukraine but Russia suspended this process after Ukraine did not renew its unilaterally declared ceasefire on 1 July 2014 in the conflict in the Donbas. According to the fleet commander Aleksandr Vitko, this happened because the vessels were old "and, if used [by Ukraine], could hurt its own people".

Crimea was then formally annexed into Russia through a referendum, but this was declared invalid by United Nations General Assembly Resolution 68/262.

===== Strengthening the fleet =====
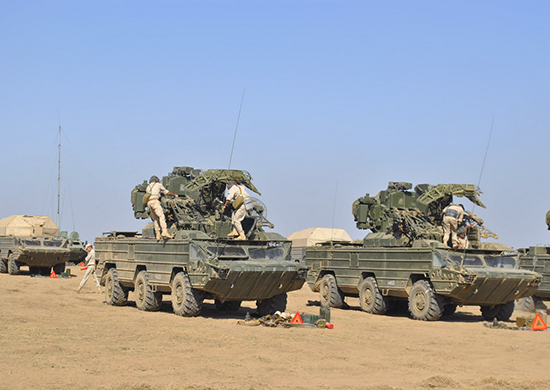
Exercises of the air defense system regiment of the army corps of the Black Sea Fleet

From that point, Russia proceeded to consolidate its military position in Crimea, which it now regards as an integral part of the Russian Federation, though this position is not one supported by the vast majority of the international community. The Russian seizure of Crimea in 2014 changed the situation and role of the Black Sea Fleet significantly. Analysis undertaken by Micheal Peterson of the US Naval War College suggested that since the Russian seizure of Crimea, the modernization of Russian shore-based assets and of the Black Sea Fleet itself assisted in re-establishing Russian military dominance in the region. Specifically Peterson argued in 2019: "Russian maritime dominance in the Black Sea is back. The shift was made possible by Moscow's 2014 seizure of Crimea and subsequent buildup of combat and maritime law enforcement capabilities in the region".

Prior to the annexation of Crimea in 2014, divergent announcements had been made concerning the future composition of the fleet. In June 2010, Russian Navy Commander-in-Chief Admiral Vladimir Vysotsky announced that Russia was reviewing plans for the naval modernization of the Black Sea Fleet. The plans include 15 new warships and submarines by 2020. These vessels were to partially replace the reported decommissioning of Kerch, Ochakov (decommissioned in 2011 and sunk as a blockship in 2014), several large support ships, and a diesel-electric submarine. Also in 2010, Russian Navy Headquarters sources projected that, by 2020, six frigates of the Project 22350 Admiral Gorshkov class, six submarines of Project 677 Lada class, two large landing ships of Project 11711 Ivan Gren class and four class-unspecified ships would be delivered. Due to the obsolescence of the Beriev Be-12 by 2015, they were planned to be replaced with Il-38s. Sukhoi Su-24M aircraft were planned to be upgraded to Su-24M2 at the same time.

The replacement of the Black Sea Fleet's Soviet-era missile boats and corvettes with vessels of more modern design had been a priority since 2010. A similar modernization is also taking place in the Baltic Fleet and the Caspian Flotilla. Utilizing Russia's internal waterways provides the Russian Navy with the capacity to transfer both corvettes and other light units, such as landing craft, among its three western fleets and the Caspian Flotilla as may be required. Analysis in May 2022 suggested that it might be feasible for the Russian Navy even to move its Kilo-class submarines between the Black Sea and the Baltic via the internal waterways.

The projection of power into the Mediterranean also returned as a significant role for the Black Sea Fleet with the creation of the Russian Navy's permanent task force in the Mediterranean. Both the Black Sea Fleet and the Caspian Flotilla have supported Russian involvement in the Syrian Civil War with units from the former now routinely deployed into the Mediterranean. The deployment of submarines from the Black Sea Fleet to the Mediterranean has become a routine occurrence (though the need to send them for "maintenance" in the Baltic, so as to comply with terms of the Montreux Convention, lengthens the timeframe of such deployments significantly). In late 2021 it was reported that one of the new Priboy-class helicopter assault ships, the Mitrofan Moskalenko, had been earmarked to enter service with the Black Sea Fleet "within the next few years" in the role of fleet flagship. If confirmed such a deployment would significantly enhance the fleet's power projection capabilities.

Prior to the war with Ukraine, the Russians attempted a build-up of surface-to-surface and surface-to-air missile assets in the region. Dmitry Gorenburg of the Centre for Naval Analysis (CNA) argued in 2018 that: "Russia's expanded military footprint in Crimea allows it to carry out a range of operations that it was not capable of prior to 2014. The deployment of S-400, Bastion-P and Bal missiles seemed designed to allow the Russian military to establish an anti-access/area denial zone (A2/AD) covering almost all of the Black Sea. By using a combination of ground-based and ship-based missiles, backed with strong electronic warfare capabilities, the Russian military sought to inhibit military movement into the Black Sea and deny freedom of action to an opponent. Michael Kofman of CNA, argued in 2019 that while there is no A2/AD doctrine or term in Russian military strategy, Russian forces nevertheless were organized at an operational and strategic level to deploy a wide range of overlapping defensive and offensive capabilities that extend beyond just one theatre of operations like the Black Sea.

The American response to the dense shore-based anti-ship and air defence capabilities that Russia developed in the Black Sea region, and elsewhere, was to place greater emphasis on striking at potential Black Sea and other targets utilizing stand-off air-launched cruise missiles deployed on American long-range bombers. Additionally, the United States, the United Kingdom and Turkey entered into contracts to supply new corvettes, missile-armed fast attack craft, patrol boats and unmanned air vehicles to the Ukrainian Navy.

In 2020, the Black Sea Fleet obtained seven new warships and auxiliary ships, including corvette Grayvoron, patrol ship Pavel Derzhavin, seagoing tug Sergey Balk, as well as a harbour tugs and three hydrographic survey vessels. One year prior to Russia's invasion of Ukraine, Russian sources suggested that more vessels would enter service.

===== Russo-Ukrainian naval standoff =====
On 29 January 2021, three US naval vessels entered the Black Sea for the first time in three years. On 1 February, the Ukrainian president Volodymyr Zelenskyy argued for NATO membership for Ukraine. On 19 March, another significant US naval deployment to the Black Sea took place, as cruiser USS Monterey and destroyer USS Thomas Hudner entered the sea on 19 and 20 March respectively. Prior to the scheduled deployment, on 12 March Russian cruiser Moskva made an exit to sea and on 19 March all six submarines of the Black Sea Fleet went to sea, which was an unprecedented event.

Russian ground forces also started a buildup on the border with Ukraine. On 2 April, Zelenskyy had his first telephone conversation with Biden, and on 6 April he called NATO's Secretary-General Jens Stoltenberg pressuring NATO to speed up Ukrainian path to the membership. On 8 April, Russia started moving ten of its Caspian Flotilla warships to the Black Sea. Six amphibious and three artillery boats of Serna and Shmel classes, as well as a hydrographic boat GS-599, were reported in transit, while Black Sea Fleet frigate Admiral Essen conducted an artillery exercise, usually done to raise the readiness for the amphibious landing. The same day, the US decided to send two warships to the Black Sea.

On 9 April 2021, tensions rose further and Ukraine promised not to attack the separatists, while Russia considered intervening. On the same day, two Black Sea Fleet corvettes, Vishny Volochyok and Gravoron, conducted an exercise. The two US destroyers were clarified by Turkey to be USS Roosevelt and USS Donald Cook, while Putin stressed the importance of the Montreux Convention in a telephone conversation with Turkish president Recep Erdogan. On 14 April, the deployment of the two US destroyers was cancelled. On 17 April, amphibious ships Aleksandr Otrakovsky and Kondoponga of the Northern Fleet and Kaliningrad and Korolyov of the Baltic Fleet strengthened the amphibious warfare capabilities of the Black Sea Fleet.

In November, further tensions started amidst the build-up of Russian ground forces on the Ukraine border. On 2 November, the destroyer USS Porter entered the Black Sea, followed on 25 November by the destroyer USS Arleigh Burke. In late October, the Russian Black Sea fleet held a large exercise with a cruiser, a frigate and three corvettes.

===== Incident with HMS Defender =====
On 23 June 2021, the United Kingdom's HMS Defender undertook a freedom of navigation patrol through the disputed waters around the Crimean Peninsula. The Ministry of Defence of the Russian Federation and border guards said they fired warning shots from coast guard patrol ships and dropped bombs from a Sukhoi Su-24 attack aircraft in the path of Defender after, according to the Russian Defence Ministry, it had allegedly strayed for about 20 minutes as far as 3 km (2 miles) into waters off the coast of Crimea, which Russia annexed in 2014 in a move mostly unrecognised internationally. The UK military denied any warning shots were fired and said the ship was in innocent passage in Ukraine's territorial sea, later clarifying that heavy guns were fired three miles astern and could not be considered to be warning shots.

===== 2022 Russian invasion of Ukraine =====
A build-up of Russian forces around Ukraine and in Belarus began toward the end of 2021, ostensibly for exercises. In February 2022, the Black Sea Fleet was reinforced by six landing ships: three Ropucha-class landing ships (Minsk (127), Korolev (130) and Kaliningrad (102)) were drawn from the Baltic Fleet while two (Georgy Pobedonosets (016) and Olenegorsky Gornyak (012)) came from the Northern Fleet. The Ivan Gren-class landing ship, Pyotr Morgunov (117) also deployed to the Black Sea from the Northern Fleet. The 22nd Army Corps (at that time subordinate to the Black Sea Fleet but in 2023 transferred to the control of Russian Ground Forces) was also reinforced, including by the 247th Regiment of the 7th Guards Mountain Air Assault Division as well as by the 56th Guards Air Assault Regiment, subordinate to the same division. On the eve of the conflict, it was reported that the headquarters of the 58th Combined Arms Army had deployed to Crimea commanding between 12 and 17 battalion tactical groups.

The Russian invasion of Ukraine began on 24 February 2022 and it was initially reported that this included an amphibious landing at Odesa by elements of Russian Naval Infantry and the Black Sea Fleet. However, the report of a landing at Odesa on 24 February subsequently proved to be false. On 24 February 2022, the cruiser Moskva and the patrol ship Vasily Bykov bombarded Snake Island in the Danube Delta and captured it from its Ukrainian garrison. On 26 February 2022 it was reported that Russian forces made an amphibious assault at Mariupol utilizing half of their landing ships in the Black Sea. A second Russian amphibious group was said still to be positioned in the vicinity of Odesa.

On 28 February 2022, Turkey indicated that it was closing the Dardanelles Straits to all foreign warships for the duration of the conflict. Turkish Foreign Minister Mevlüt Çavuşoğlu argued that the move was consistent with terms of the Montreux Convention. An exception would be allowed for Russian ships returning from the Mediterranean to Black Sea bases where they were registered.

As of early March 2022, the Ukrainian navy was confirmed to have lost two vessels, including the frigate Hetman Sahaidachny, scuttled by its crew to avoid capture. Vasily Bykov was reported as having entered Sevastopol on 16 March 2022 with no obvious damage.

On 19 March 2022, the Deputy Commander of Russian Black Sea Fleet Captain First Rank Andrey Nikolaevich Paliy was reportedly killed in action near Mariupol in Ukraine.

On 22 March 2022, a video appeared of a Raptor-class patrol boat being hit and damaged by an anti-tank guided missile. According to Russian sources, it had to be towed away afterwards.

On 24 March 2022, the Ukrainian military hit and destroyed the Russian Tapir-class landing ship Saratov at the Port of Berdiansk. In July 2022 it became known that Saratov had been salvaged and would be towed to Kerch, Crimea. Two other Russian Ropucha-class landing ships, the Tsezar Kunikov, and the Novocherkassk, that were docked nearby sailed away, with fire and smoke billowing out of one.

Also in March 2022, the Russian Navy bombed several civilian ships, including a cargo ship belonging to Bangladesh.

On 13 April 2022, Moskva, the fleet's flagship, was severely damaged after an explosion. The Ukrainian government claimed it had hit the ship with two Neptune cruise missiles. The Russian government claimed the damage was a result of an ammunition explosion. According to the Russian government, everyone on the ship was evacuated. On 14 April, the Russian Ministry of Defence confirmed the ship had sunk. On 15 April, a United States senior defense official confirmed that the ship was hit by two Ukrainian Neptune missiles about 65 nautical miles south of Odesa. On 6 May 2022 a letter from the Black Sea Fleet's prosecutor general's office to the family of one of the sailors lost on the Moskva was made public. Families will not be receiving compensation as "the sinking took place in international waters by accident".

On 8 May 2022, Ukrainian officials released footage showing the destruction of two Raptor-class patrol boats and the damaging of a third one, adding that 46 Russian crew members were killed during the operation.

In the first week of May 2022, a video appeared of a Ukrainian Bayraktar TB2 drone hitting and sinking a BK-16 high-speed assault boat near Snake Island. The wreck was later recovered.

On 12 May 2022, Ukrainian news media carried reports that, according to the Odesa military spokesman, the Russian logistics vessel Vsevolod Bobrov was on fire near Snake Island. Russia denied the claims. Three days later, a US-backed media outlet carried photographs of the ship unharmed moored at Sevastopol. The ship was also seen with the Pantsir-S mobile surface-to-air missile system on board while docked in Sevastopol.

On 15 May 2022, four Kalibr missiles launched from the Black Sea hit Ukrainian military facilities at Yavoriv, near Lviv. The attack was "probably" carried out by submarines. Lviv Oblast Governor Maxim Kozitsky acknowledged that the target was "completely destroyed".

On 17 May 2022, the Ministry of Defense of Russia reported that seaborne Kalibr missiles struck railway facilities at Starichi station near Lviv the night before. The attack was aimed at NATO weapons deliveries to Ukraine. Governor Maxim Kozitsky confirmed the damage on railway infrastructure. The command of the Ukrainian Air Defence claims the shooting down of three missiles in the area.

On 17 June 2022, Russian rescue tug Vasily Bekh was reportedly sunk due to two hits by anti-ship missiles (putatively Harpoons) while carrying personnel, weapons, and ammunition to resupply Russian-occupied Snake Island.

On 31 July 2022, a drone strike at the fleet headquarters in Sevastopol wounded several people and forced the cancellation of Navy Day commemorations.

On 9 August 2022, huge explosions occurred at Saky airbase, destroying several fighter planes of the fleet's naval aviation. Some days later, an anonymous Western official said that "[w]e now assess that the events of ... August 9 put more than half of [the] Black Sea fleet's naval aviation combat jets out of use." On 16 August 2022, Hvardiiske airbase, a large ammunition dump in Maiske, and an electrical substation in Dzhankoi were hit with explosions, and on 19 August 2022, large explosions were heard at Belbek and Russian antiaircraft batteries were active around the Crimean Bridge at Kerch.

On 17 August 2022, Russian state media announced that Viktor Sokolov had been appointed commander of the fleet without any ceremony, apparently due to the yellow terrorist threat following a series of explosions.

On 29 October 2022, Ukrainian forces used an Unmanned Aerial and Submarine Vehicle to strike Russian forces in Sevastopol, Crimea. According to Russia, Ukrainian UAVs slightly damaged the Natya-class minesweeper Ivan Golubets.

Yury Ivanov-class intelligence ship Ivan Khurs was possibly damaged by one of three Ukrainian sea drones on 24 May 2023.

On 4 August 2023, near the Port of Novorossiysk, the Project 775 Ropucha-class landing ship Olenegorsky Gornyak was seriously damaged by a joint effort of the Ukrainian SBU and the Ukrainian Navy, possibly using a sea drone, and towed to port by the Russian Navy. Following the attack the Ukrainian Navy reported Russian ships leaving port and to some extent dispersing in the Black Sea.

On 13 September 2023, Storm Shadows were used in a strike against the Sevastopol port, seriously damaging the Rostov na Donu submarine and seriously damaging (according to some sources, beyond repair) the Ropucha-class landing ship Minsk.

On 22 September 2023, at least three Storm Shadow missiles hit the Black Sea Fleet headquarters in Sevastopol.

On 4 November 2023, Ukrainian forces struck Zalyv Shipbuilding yard in Russian-occupied Kerch, Crimea, with cruise missiles, damaging the relatively new Karakurt-class corvette Askold (ru), which carries Kalibur cruise missiles. On 6 November 2023 President Zelenskyy stated that the ship was destroyed.

On 25 December 2023, the large landing ship Novocherkassk was struck by Ukrainian aircraft carrying guided missiles in Port of Feodosiya.

In late December 2023, Ukraine hit and destroyed a Russian project 205P "Tarantul" (NATO designation: Stenka) guard ship in the port of Sevastopol.

On 1 February 2024, Ukraine released video claiming to show the sinking of the R-334 Ivanovets using USVs.

On 14 February 2024, Ukraine released a video showing the sinking of the Ropucha-class landing ship Tsezar Kunikov off the coast of Crimea.

On 5 March 2024 Sergey Kotov was attacked (again) by maritime drones, with Ukrainian intelligence claiming that the ship was sunk.

On 23 March 2024, the defense forces of Ukraine hit the Ropucha-class landing ships Yamal and Azov. Additionally, they said they hit the landing ship Kostiantyn Olshansky which had previously been part of the Ukrainian navy before 2014.

By March 2024, Ukraine's Navy spokesman Dmytro Pletenchuk said they had disabled or destroyed one third of the Russian Black Sea fleet.

On 6 June 2024, a Project 498 "Saturn" tugboat was destroyed by a Ukrainian naval strike.

On 2 August 2024, Ukraine reported they had hit and sunk the Russian submarine B-237.

On 15 December 2025, Ukraine used a Sea Baby underwater drone to disable a Russian submarine at the port of Novorossiysk, marking the first known use of the system in such an attack.

As of 14 June 2026, the pro-Ukrainian partisan movement Atesh claimed that Black Sea Fleet is planning to relocate its headquarters from Sevastopol to Novorossiysk. Atesh also further claimed that officers had privately started moving their families from Sevastopol to Novorossiysk, by disposing of property and moving into new residences in Novorossiysk without official orders.

== Commanders ==
#	Rank	Name	Year
1	VADM	Aleksey Fedotovich Klokachev	1783
2	VADM	Yakov Filippovich Sukhotin	1784 – 1785
3	RADM	Nikolay Semenovich Mordvinov	1785 – 1789
4	RADM	Marko Ivanovich Voynovich	1789 – 1790
5	RADM	Fyodor Fyodorovich Ushakov	1790 – 1792
#	ADM	Nikolay Semenovich Mordvinov	1792 – 1799
6	ADM	Vilim Petrovich Fondezin	1799 – 1802
7	ADM	Aleksandr Ivanovich de Travers	1802 – 1811
8	ADM	Roman Romanovich Gall	1811
9	VADM	Nikolay Lvovich Yazykov	1811 – 1816
10	ADM	Aleksey Samuilovich Greig	1816 – 1833
11	ADM	Mikhail Petrovich Lazarev	1834 – 1851
12	ADM	Morits Borisovich Berg	1851 – 1855
13	VADM	Nikolay Fedorovich Metlin	Sep 1855 – Dec 1855
14	VADM	Aleksandr Ivanovich Panfilov	Jan 1856 – Aug 1856
15	RADM	Grigoriy Ivanovich Butakov	Aug 1856 – Jan 1860
16	VADM	Bogdan Alexandrovich Glazenap	1860 – Jan 1871
17	ADM	Nikolay Andreyevich Arkas	1871 – 1881
18	ADM	Mikhail Pavlovich Manganari	1881 – 1882
19	VADM	Aleksey Alekseyevich Peshchurov (1834–1891)	1882 – 1890
20	RADM	Roman Andreevich Grenkvist	1890
21	VADM	Nikolay Vasilyevich Kopytov	1891 – 1898
22	VADM	Yevgeni Ivanovich Alekseyev	1898
23	VADM	Sergey Petrovich Tyrtov	May 1898 – 1903
24	VADM	Yakov Appolonovich Giltebrandt	1903
25	VADM	Nikolay Illarionovich Skrydlov	1903 – 1904
26	VADM	Aleksandr Khristianovich Kriger	1904
27	VADM	Grigoriy Pavlovich Chukhnin	1904 – 1906
28	RADM	Ivan Konstantinovich Grigorovich	1906
29	VADM	Nikolay Illarionovich Skrydlov	1906 – 1907
30	RADM	Genrikh Faddeevich Tsyvinskiy	1907
31	RADM	Robert Nikolayevich Viren	1907 – 1908
32	VADM	Ivan Fyodorovich Bostrem	1908 – 1909
33	VADM	Vladimir Simonovich Sarnavskiy	1909 – 1911
34	VADM	Ivan Fyodorovich Bostrem	1911
35	RADM	Pavel Ivanovich Novitskiy	1911
36	VADM	Andrey Avgustovich Ehbergard	1911 – Jun 1916
37	VADM	Aleksandr Vasilyevich Kolchak	Jun 1916 – Jun 1917
38 (Acting)	RADM	Veniamin Konstantinovich Lukin	Jun 1917 – Jul 1917
39	RADM	Aleksandr Vasilyevich Nemitts	Jul 1917 – Dec 1917
40	RADM	Mikhail Sablin	1918
41	Captain 1st Rank	Aleksandr Ivanovich Tikhmenev	1918
42	Captain 1st Rank	Aleksandr Ivanovich Sheykovskiy	1919
43	Captain 1st Rank	Aleksey Vladimirovich Dombrovskiy	May 1920 – Oct 1920
44		Ehduard Samuilovich Pantserzhanskiy	Nov 1920 – Nov 1921
45		Andrey Semenovich Maksimov	Nov 1921 – Jul 1922
46		Aleksandr Karlovich Vekman	Jul 1922 – May 1924
47		Mikhail Vladimirovich Viktorov	May 1924 – Dec 1924
48		Ehduard Samuilovich Pantserzhanskiy	Dec 1924 – Oct 1926
49		Vladimir Mitrofanovich Orlov	Oct 1926 – Jun 1931
50	Fleet Flag Officer 2nd Rank	Ivan Kuz'mich Kozhanov	Jun 1931 – Aug 1937
51	Fleet Flag Officer 2nd Rank	Petr Ivanovich Smirnov-Svetlovskiy	Aug 1937 – Dec 1937
52	Fleet Flag Officer 2nd Rank	Ivan Stepanovich Yumashev	1938 – Mar 1939
53	VADM	Filipp Sergeyevich Oktyabrskiy	Mar 1939 – Apr 1943
54	VADM	Lev Anatol'evich Vladimirskiy	Apr 1943 – Mar 1944
55	VADM	Filipp Sergeyevich Oktyabrskiy	Mar 1944 – Nov 1948
56	ADM	Nikolai Efremovich Basistiy	Nov 1948 – Aug 1951
57	ADM	Sergey Georgiyevich Gorshkov	Aug 1951 – Jul 1955
58	VADM	Viktor Aleksandrovich Parkhomenko	Jul 1955 – Dec 1955
59	ADM	Vladimir Afanasyevich Kasatonov	Dec 1955 – Feb 1962
60	ADM	Serafim Evgeniyevich Chursin	Feb 1962 – Dec 1968
61	ADM	Viktor Sergeyevich Sysoyev	Dec 1968 – Mar 1974
62	ADM	Nikolay Ivanovich Khovrin	Mar 1974 – April 1983
63	ADM	Aleksey Mikhailovich Kalinin	Apr 1983 – Jul 1985
64	ADM	Mikhail Nikolayevich Khronopulo	Jul 1985 – Oct 1991
65	ADM	Igor Vladimirovich Kasatonov	Oct 1991 – Dec 1992
66	ADM	Eduard Dmitriyevich Baltin	Dec 1992 – Feb 1996
67	ADM	Viktor Andreyevich Kravchenko	Feb 1996 – Jul 1998
68	ADM	Vladimir Petrovich Komoyedov	Jul 1998 – Oct 2002
69	ADM	Vladimir Vasilyevich Masorin	Oct 2002 – Feb 2005
70	ADM	Aleksandr Arkadyevich Tatarinov	Feb 2005 – Jul 2007
71	VADM	Aleksandr Dmitrievich Kletskov	Jul 2007 – Jul 2010
72	VADM	Vladimir Ivanovich Korolyov	Jul 2010 – Jun 2011
73	VADM	Aleksandr Nikolayevich Fedotenkov	Jun 2011 – May 2013
74	ADM	Aleksandr Viktorovich Vitko	May 2013 – June 2018
75	VADM	Aleksandr Alekseevich Moiseev	June 2018 – May 2019
76	ADM	Igor Vladimirovich Osipov	May 2019 – August 2022
77	ADM	Viktor Nikolayevich Sokolov	August 2022 –February 2024
78	ADM	Sergei Mikhailovich Pinchuk	February 2024–

== Order of battle ==
Since 2024, the Black Sea Fleet has been subordinate to the general command of the Russian Navy. The Russian Coast Guard and National Guard of Russia provide additional armed patrol capabilities, which have also been expanded since the Russian seizure of Crimea to support the enforcement of Russian territorial claims. As of 2025, the Russian Coast Guard was said to deploy about 74 patrol vessels of various types in the Black Sea.

Since the start of the Russo-Ukraine War, the Black Sea Fleet has experienced serious losses in ships and materiel. However, in the context of a conflict that is still ongoing, descriptions of the fleet's order of battle may, at times, be necessarily imprecise. The information presented below constitutes best estimates on the state of the Black Sea Fleet based on open sources. For a broader list of Russian and Ukrainian ship losses in the war see:

=== Major surface warships: 30th Surface Ship Division ===
#	Type	Class	Name	Year	Notes
861	Guided Missile Frigate	Krivak	Ladnyy	1980	Active as of 2023
868	Guided Missile Frigate	Krivak	Pytlivyy	1981	Active as of 2024
494	Guided Missile Frigate	Admiral Grigorovich	Admiral Grigorovich	2016	Operating in the Baltic and Mediterranean as of 2025
490	Guided Missile Frigate	Admiral Grigorovich	Admiral Essen	2016	May remain active as of September 2026 though degree of operational capability is unclear; either or both Admiral Essen and/or Admiral Makarov reported to have been damaged in March 2026; Admiral Essen claimed to have been attacked again in May, August and September 2026
499	Guided Missile Frigate	Admiral Grigorovich	Admiral Makarov	2017	May remain active as of September 2026 though degree of capability is unclear; flagship of the Black Sea Fleet; either or both Admiral Essen and/or Admiral Makarov may have been damaged in March 2026; claimed attacked again in August 2026
734	Multi-role Corvette	Steregushchiy	Merkury	2023	Active in the Baltic and Mediterranean as of 2024; restricted in entering the Black Sea due to the Russo-Ukraine War and because of limitations imposed by Turkey on the use of the Bosporus The ship was left mostly submerged following an explosion and fire while anchored in the port of Benghazi, Libya, in November 2026.

- The former fleet flagship, the Slava-class cruiser Moskva, was sunk on 14 April 2022.

=== Diesel/electric submarines (SSKs): 4th Independent Submarine Brigade ===
#	Type	Name	Class	Year	Base	Notes
554	Diesel Attack Submarine	Alrosa	Kilo 877V	1990	Sevastopol	Active; reportedly partially employed as pump-jet propulsor test platform after completing refit in 2022
555	Diesel Attack Submarine	Novorossiysk	Improved Kilo 636.3	2014	Novorossiysk	B-237 Rostov-na-Donu heavily damaged by a Ukrainian cruise missile strike while dry docked at Sevastopol on 12 September 2023, claimed destroyed by Ukraine in a second strike in August 2024; B-261 Novorossiysk & B-265 Krasnodar deployed in the Mediterranean/Baltic since start of Russo-Ukraine War; one Improved Kilo (likely B-271 Kolpino) reported damaged in Ukrainian UUV attack at Novorossiysk in December 2025, however extent of damage disputed
556	Diesel Attack Submarine	Rostov-na-Donu	Improved Kilo 636.3	2014	Novorossiysk	B-237 Rostov-na-Donu heavily damaged by a Ukrainian cruise missile strike while dry docked at Sevastopol on 12 September 2023, claimed destroyed by Ukraine in a second strike in August 2024; B-261 Novorossiysk & B-265 Krasnodar deployed in the Mediterranean/Baltic since start of Russo-Ukraine War; one Improved Kilo (likely B-271 Kolpino) reported damaged in Ukrainian UUV attack at Novorossiysk in December 2025, however extent of damage disputed
557	Diesel Attack Submarine	Stary Oskol	Improved Kilo 636.3	2015	Novorossiysk	B-237 Rostov-na-Donu heavily damaged by a Ukrainian cruise missile strike while dry docked at Sevastopol on 12 September 2023, claimed destroyed by Ukraine in a second strike in August 2024; B-261 Novorossiysk & B-265 Krasnodar deployed in the Mediterranean/Baltic since start of Russo-Ukraine War; one Improved Kilo (likely B-271 Kolpino) reported damaged in Ukrainian UUV attack at Novorossiysk in December 2025, however extent of damage disputed
558	Diesel Attack Submarine	Krasnodar	Improved Kilo 636.3	2015	Novorossiysk	B-237 Rostov-na-Donu heavily damaged by a Ukrainian cruise missile strike while dry docked at Sevastopol on 12 September 2023, claimed destroyed by Ukraine in a second strike in August 2024; B-261 Novorossiysk & B-265 Krasnodar deployed in the Mediterranean/Baltic since start of Russo-Ukraine War; one Improved Kilo (likely B-271 Kolpino) reported damaged in Ukrainian UUV attack at Novorossiysk in December 2025, however extent of damage disputed
559	Diesel Attack Submarine	Veliky Novgorod	Improved Kilo 636.3	2016	Novorossiysk	B-237 Rostov-na-Donu heavily damaged by a Ukrainian cruise missile strike while dry docked at Sevastopol on 12 September 2023, claimed destroyed by Ukraine in a second strike in August 2024; B-261 Novorossiysk & B-265 Krasnodar deployed in the Mediterranean/Baltic since start of Russo-Ukraine War; one Improved Kilo (likely B-271 Kolpino) reported damaged in Ukrainian UUV attack at Novorossiysk in December 2025, however extent of damage disputed
560	Diesel Attack Submarine	Kolpino	Improved Kilo 636.3	2016	Novorossiysk	B-237 Rostov-na-Donu heavily damaged by a Ukrainian cruise missile strike while dry docked at Sevastopol on 12 September 2023, claimed destroyed by Ukraine in a second strike in August 2024; B-261 Novorossiysk & B-265 Krasnodar deployed in the Mediterranean/Baltic since start of Russo-Ukraine War; one Improved Kilo (likely B-271 Kolpino) reported damaged in Ukrainian UUV attack at Novorossiysk in December 2025, however extent of damage disputed

=== Missile corvettes: 41st Missile Boat Brigade ===
166th Novorossiysk Small Missile Boat Division
#	Type	Name	Class	Year	Notes
615	Missile corvette	Bora	Dergach	1989	Active as of 2024
616	Missile corvette	Samum	Dergach	2000	Damaged by Ukrainian naval drone on 12 September 2023; reported active as of 2024
626	Missile corvette	Orekhovo-Zuyevo	Buyan-M	2018	Active; deployed in the Mediterranean/Baltic as of 2023
609	Missile corvette	Vyshniy Volochyok	Buyan-M	2018	Active; damaged in collision with civilian tanker August 2025 while undertaking evasive manoeuvres in the face of a drone attack
630	Missile corvette	Ingushetiya	Buyan-M	2019	Reported active as of mid-2023
600	Missile corvette	Grayvoron	Buyan-M	2021	Reported active as of mid-2023
TBC	Missile corvette	Tucha	Karakurt	2023	Deployed to the Black Sea via inland waterways in 2023 & reported at Novorossiysk; reported in the Caspian as of May 2024 and active as of April 2025
TBC	Missile corvette	Askold?	Karakurt	Projected 2024 (not yet commissioned when attacked)	Damaged by a Ukrainian cruise missile strike on the port Kerch on 4 November 2023 Ukraine claimed the destruction of the ship; other reports suggest that repairs were being attempted as of late 2023
577	Missile corvette	Typhoon	Karakurt	2025	Delivered in 2025 and reported active participating in exercises in the Caspian as of April

- Karakurt-class corvette Tsiklon claimed destroyed by Ukrainian officials in May 2024; Russian sources seemingly confirmed the ship's destruction.

295th Sulinsk Missile Boat Division
#	Type	Name	Class	Year	Notes
Missile corvette	955	R-60 Burya	Tarantul-III	1987	Active as of 2024
Missile corvette	953	R-239 Naberezhnye Chelny	Tarantul-III	1991	Active as of 2024

- Tarantul-class corvette Ivanovets confirmed sunk in Ukrainian attack in February 2024.

=== ASW corvettes/minesweepers/patrol vessels: 68th Coastal Defense Ship Brigade ===
149th Antisubmarine Ship Task Force
#	Type	Name	Class	Year	Notes
071	Anti-submarine (ASW) corvette	MPK-118 Suzdalets	Grisha III	1983	Both active at the start of the Russo-Ukraine War; Muromets reported active and receiving new camouflage as of 2023; two Grisha-class vessels reported relocated from Crimea to the eastern Black Sea in 2024 & one vessel may have been damaged by fire (specific ship, cause & extent unknown) in November 2025
064	Anti-submarine (ASW) corvette	MPK-134 Muromets	Grisha III	1983	Both active at the start of the Russo-Ukraine War; Muromets reported active and receiving new camouflage as of 2023; two Grisha-class vessels reported relocated from Crimea to the eastern Black Sea in 2024 & one vessel may have been damaged by fire (specific ship, cause & extent unknown) in November 2025

150th Minesweeper Task Force
#	Type	Name	Class	Year	Notes
911	Seagoing Minesweeper	Ivan Golubets	Natya	1973	Damaged on 29 October 2022 during a drone attack on the port of Sevastopol; subsequently repaired; Active as of 2023
601	Seagoing Minesweeper	Ivan Antonov	Alexandrit	2018	Active as of 2023
659	Seagoing Minesweeper	Vladimir Emelyanov	Alexandrit	2019	Active; deployed in the Mediterranean/Baltic as of 2023
631	Seagoing Minesweeper	Georgy Kurbatov	Alexandrit	2021	Active as of 2022

- Natya-class minesweeper Kovrovets reportedly destroyed in Ukrainian attack in May 2024;
- Lida-class minesweeper RT-233 reportedly transferred from the Caspian Flotilla to the Black Sea Fleet as of June 2023

102nd Anti-Saboteur Squadron
#	Type	Name	Class	Year	Notes
836	Anti-Saboteur Boat	Yunarmeets Kryma	Grachonok	2014	All active at the start of Russo-Ukraine War
837	Anti-Saboteur Boat	Kinel	Grachonok	2014	All active at the start of Russo-Ukraine War
844	Anti-Saboteur Boat	Pavel Silaev	Grachonok	2017	All active at the start of Russo-Ukraine War
682	Anti-Saboteur Boat	P-342 Yunarmeets Baltiki	Raptor	2015	Originally assigned to the Baltic Fleet, but serving in the Black Sea Fleet as of 2022; damaged in 2022 Ukrainian attack but reported to have undergone repairs
845	Anti-Saboteur Boat	P-345 Buyevlyanin?	Raptor	2015	Ukrainian officials released three separate videos showing six Raptor-class boats damaged/destroyed in 2022; some may have been repaired but at least three Raptor-class boats listed as destroyed as of mid-2024; some Raptors reported operational at Tartus naval base in Syria as of late 2024 and again in June 2026 (See also: 136th Anti-Saboteur Squadron, below)
838	Anti-Saboteur Boat	P-?	Raptor	2015	Ukrainian officials released three separate videos showing six Raptor-class boats damaged/destroyed in 2022; some may have been repaired but at least three Raptor-class boats listed as destroyed as of mid-2024; some Raptors reported operational at Tartus naval base in Syria as of late 2024 and again in June 2026 (See also: 136th Anti-Saboteur Squadron, below)
850	Anti-Saboteur Boat	P-413 Andrey Paliy?	Raptor	2017	Ukrainian officials released three separate videos showing six Raptor-class boats damaged/destroyed in 2022; some may have been repaired but at least three Raptor-class boats listed as destroyed as of mid-2024; some Raptors reported operational at Tartus naval base in Syria as of late 2024 and again in June 2026 (See also: 136th Anti-Saboteur Squadron, below)
852	Anti-Saboteur Boat	P-425 Chapaevsk?	Raptor	2017	Ukrainian officials released three separate videos showing six Raptor-class boats damaged/destroyed in 2022; some may have been repaired but at least three Raptor-class boats listed as destroyed as of mid-2024; some Raptors reported operational at Tartus naval base in Syria as of late 2024 and again in June 2026 (See also: 136th Anti-Saboteur Squadron, below)

- Additional Russian navy patrol boats, including at least two vessels of the Dockstavarvet IC16M-class (P-835 & P-834), are reportedly deployed in the Black Sea, while others (including two Gyurza-M-class gunboats) have been put into Russian service following capture from the Ukrainian Navy See: List of active Russian Navy ships#Patrol boats
- Other patrol boats are operated in the Black Sea by the FSB Coast Guard, Federal Protective Service, Russian National Guard and other agencies. These have included at least 29 Project 12150 Mangust-class vessels of the Coast Guard, some of which have been reported as destroyed or damaged. One Zhuk-class patrol boat, AK-388 (either in Coast Guard or Navy service), transferred from the Northern to the Black Sea Fleet in 2026.

=== ASW corvettes/patrol ships: 184th Novorossiysk Coastal Defense Brigade ===
181st Antisubmarine Ship Division
#	Type	Name	Class	Year	Notes
055	ASW corvette	MPK-199 Kasimov	Grisha-III	1984	Both active at the start of the Russo-Ukraine War; two Grisha-class vessels reported relocated from Crimea to the eastern Black Sea in 2024 & one vessel may have been damaged by fire (specific ship, cause & extent unknown) in November 2025
054	ASW corvette	MPK-217 Eysk	Grisha-III	1987	Both active at the start of the Russo-Ukraine War; two Grisha-class vessels reported relocated from Crimea to the eastern Black Sea in 2024 & one vessel may have been damaged by fire (specific ship, cause & extent unknown) in November 2025
368	Patrol ship	Vasily Bykov	Project 22160	2018	Active as of 2023; claimed attacked, in conjunction with a large-scale Ukrainian drone assault on Novorossiysk, in August 2026.
375	Patrol ship	Dmitriy Rogachev	Project 22160	2019	Active as of the start of the Russo-Ukraine war
363	Patrol ship	Pavel Derzhavin	Project 22160	2020	As of 2024 reported repaired and re-located from Crimea to the eastern Black Sea
417	Patrol ship	Viktor Velikiy	Project 22160	2025	Active and operating in the Baltic/Mediterranean as of 2025

- Project 22160 ship Sergey Kotov reported damaged & claimed as sunk by Ukrainian naval drone attack on 14 September 2023; She was still afloat when attacked again by maritime drones, with Ukraine again claiming the vessel sunk in March 2024. As of mid-2024, other sources also reported her as sunk.

170th Minesweeper Division
#	Type	Name	Class	Year	Notes
901	Minesweeper	Anatoliy Zheleznyakov	Gorya	1988	Active as of 2020
770	Minesweeper	Valentin Pikul	Natya	2001	Active as of 2022; according to Ukrainian report, may have been damaged in drone strike March 2026
908	Minesweeper	Vice-Admiral Zakharin	Natya	2009	Active as of 2023
435	Minesweeper	BT-726	Sonya	1976	Unclear if active
575	Landing Craft	D-144?	Serna	2008	Ukrainian officials released video of a Serna-class landing craft being destroyed by a Bayraktar TB2 drone at Snake Island in early May 2022;
659	Landing Craft	D-199?	Serna	2014	Ukrainian officials released video of a Serna-class landing craft being destroyed by a Bayraktar TB2 drone at Snake Island in early May 2022;

- The Ondatra-class landing craft D-106 was reportedly sunk after striking mine in mid-2022

136th Anti-Saboteur Squadron
#	Type	Name	Class	Year	Notes
840	Anti-Saboteur Boat	Kadet	Grachonok	2011	Reported in the Mediterranean at the start of the Russo-Ukraine War; may have been abandoned at Tartus naval base in Syria in late 2024/early 2025 or possibly reactivated at that same location as of June 2026
841	Anti-Saboteur Boat	Suvorovets	Grachonok	2012	Reported damaged in drone attack in August 2023; status unknown
842	Anti-Saboteur Boat	Kursant Kirovets	Grachonok	2013	Active at the start of the Russo-Ukraine War
?	Anti-Saboteur Boat	P-274?	Raptor	2015	Ukrainian officials released three separate videos showing six Raptor-class boats damaged/destroyed in 2022; some may have been repaired but at least three Raptor-class boats listed as destroyed as of mid-2024; some Raptors reported operational at Tartus naval base in Syria as of late 2024 and again in June 2026
?	Anti-Saboteur Boat	P-275?	Raptor	2015	Ukrainian officials released three separate videos showing six Raptor-class boats damaged/destroyed in 2022; some may have been repaired but at least three Raptor-class boats listed as destroyed as of mid-2024; some Raptors reported operational at Tartus naval base in Syria as of late 2024 and again in June 2026
?	Anti-Saboteur Boat	P-276?	Raptor	2015	Ukrainian officials released three separate videos showing six Raptor-class boats damaged/destroyed in 2022; some may have been repaired but at least three Raptor-class boats listed as destroyed as of mid-2024; some Raptors reported operational at Tartus naval base in Syria as of late 2024 and again in June 2026

=== Major amphibious vessels: 197th Assault Ship Brigade ===
#	Type	Name	Class	Year	Notes
148	Landing Ship	Orsk	Alligator	1968	Active as of 2022 at the start of the Russo-Ukraine War
152	Landing Ship	Nikolai Filchenkov	Alligator	1975	Reported active as of 2024; may have been damaged in drone attack in April 2026
156	Landing Ship	Yamal	Ropucha	1988	On 24 March 2024, Yamal and Azov attacked in cruise missile strike in Sevastopol in March 2024; Yamal may have been damaged in drone attack again in April 2026
151	Landing Ship	Azov	Ropucha	1990	On 24 March 2024, Yamal and Azov attacked in cruise missile strike in Sevastopol in March 2024; Yamal may have been damaged in drone attack again in April 2026

#	Type	Name	Class	Year	Notes
130	Landing Ship	Korolyov	Ropucha	1983	Active, from Baltic Fleet
127	Landing Ship	Minsk	Ropucha	1983	From Baltic Fleet; heavily damaged by Ukrainian attack in September 2023; reportedly under repair as of 2024
102	Landing Ship	Kaliningrad	Ropucha	1983	Active, from Baltic Fleet
016	Landing Ship	Georgy Pobedonosets	Ropucha	1983	Active, from the Northern Fleet
012	Landing Ship	Olenegorsky Gornyak	Ropucha	1983	From the Northern Fleet; reportedly seriously damaged in 2023
016	Landing Ship	Pyotr Morgunov	Ivan Gren	2020	Active from the Northern Fleet

- Three Black Sea Fleet vessels, the Alligator-class landing ship Saratov and the Ropucha-class landing ships Tsezar Kunikov and Novocherkassk, have been confirmed as sunk: Sartov in March 2022 attack at Berdyansk, Novocherkassk in a cruise missile strike in December 2023, and Tsezar Kunikov in February 2024 attack off Crimea.

=== 388th Marine Reconnaissance Point/1229th Naval Intelligence Center ===
#	Type	Name	Class	Year	Notes
677	High-Speed Landing Craft	D-296 Vasily Dorokhin	Project 02510 (BK-16E)	2015	one Project 02510 (presumably D-310 — OSINT) claimed destroyed by a Bayraktar TB2 drone at Snake Island in 2022; another BK-16 reported attacked and destroyed or damaged in August 2025;
655	High-Speed Landing Craft	D-309	Project 02510 (BK-16E)	2018	one Project 02510 (presumably D-310 — OSINT) claimed destroyed by a Bayraktar TB2 drone at Snake Island in 2022; another BK-16 reported attacked and destroyed or damaged in August 2025;
?	High-Speed Landing Craft	D-310?	Project 02510 (BK-16E)	2021	one Project 02510 (presumably D-310 — OSINT) claimed destroyed by a Bayraktar TB2 drone at Snake Island in 2022; another BK-16 reported attacked and destroyed or damaged in August 2025;
?	High-Speed Landing Craft	D-311	Project 02510 (BK-16E)	2021	one Project 02510 (presumably D-310 — OSINT) claimed destroyed by a Bayraktar TB2 drone at Snake Island in 2022; another BK-16 reported attacked and destroyed or damaged in August 2025;
?	High-Speed Landing Craft	TDK No.490	Project 02510 (BK-16E)	2019?	one Project 02510 (presumably D-310 — OSINT) claimed destroyed by a Bayraktar TB2 drone at Snake Island in 2022; another BK-16 reported attacked and destroyed or damaged in August 2025;
?	High-Speed Landing Craft	TDK No.491	Project 02510 (BK-16E)	2019?	one Project 02510 (presumably D-310 — OSINT) claimed destroyed by a Bayraktar TB2 drone at Snake Island in 2022; another BK-16 reported attacked and destroyed or damaged in August 2025;
?	High-Speed Landing Craft	TDK No.492	Project 02510 (BK-16E)	2019	one Project 02510 (presumably D-310 — OSINT) claimed destroyed by a Bayraktar TB2 drone at Snake Island in 2022; another BK-16 reported attacked and destroyed or damaged in August 2025;
?	High-Speed Landing Craft	TDK No.493	Project 02510 (BK-16E)	2019	one Project 02510 (presumably D-310 — OSINT) claimed destroyed by a Bayraktar TB2 drone at Snake Island in 2022; another BK-16 reported attacked and destroyed or damaged in August 2025;
?	High-Speed Landing Craft	D-212?	Project 02510 (BK-16E)	2024	one Project 02510 (presumably D-310 — OSINT) claimed destroyed by a Bayraktar TB2 drone at Snake Island in 2022; another BK-16 reported attacked and destroyed or damaged in August 2025;
?	High-Speed Landing Craft	?	Project 02511 (BK-18)	2017	Status unknown
?	High-Speed Landing Craft	?	Project 02511 (BK-18)	2017	Status unknown

- 14+ Project 02450 BK-10/M/M1/D high-speed light assault boats also in service/being procured for the Black Sea Fleet.

=== Intelligence vessels: 519th Separate Squadron ===
For a more complete list of Black Sea Fleet auxiliaries, including special purpose (intelligence) vessels, see: List of active Russian Navy ships#Auxiliaries

#	Type	Name	Class	Year	Notes
512	Intelligence Vessel	Kil'din	Moma	1970	Active and deployed in the Mediterranean/Baltic; may have suffered some damage due to accidental fire in the Mediterranean in early 2025
?	Intelligence Vessel	Ekvator	Moma	1968	Unclear if active
201	Intelligence Vessel	Priazovye	Vishnya	1972	Active as of 2023, reportedly thwarted drone attack in June 2023 while protecting gas pipelines in the southeastern Black Sea
?	Intelligence Vessel	Ivan Khurs	Yury Ivanov	2018	Ukraine claimed to have damaged the vessel in USV attacks in May 2023 and again in April 2026.

=== Auxiliaries: 9th Auxiliary Ship Brigade ===
For a more complete list of Black Sea Fleet auxiliaries, including replenishment vessels, see: List of active Russian Navy ships#Auxiliaries

#	Type	Name	Class	Year	Notes
?	Fleet Oiler	Istra	Dora	1942	Transferred to the Soviet Union from Germany as part of war reparations; still reported in service
?	Fleet Oiler	Koyda	Uda	1966	Unclear if active
?	Fleet Oiler	Iman	Project 6404	1966	Active as of 2021
?	Fleet Oiler	Ivan Bubnov	Boris Chilikin (Project 1559V; Morskoy prostor)	1975	Active as of 2021
?	Fleet Oiler	Vice Admiral Paromov	Project 03182	2021	Active as of 2024; deployed in the Mediterranean/Baltic since 2022
?	Fleet Oiler	Valentin Rykov	Project 03182	2026	Active; also deployed in the Mediterranean/Baltic
?	Fleet Oiler	VTN-73	Project 03180	2014	Active as of 2022
?	Floating Ship Repair Factory	PM-138	Project 304	1969	Active as of 2022; reported in Sevastopol's Yuzhnaya Bay as of 2025
?	Floating Ship Repair Factory	PM-56	Project 304	1973	Active as of 2022
?	Logistics Support Vessel	Vsevolod Bobrov	Project 23120	2021	Arrived in the Black Sea January 2022 Claimed by Ukraine officials to have suffered major fire damage night of 11–12 May 2022 after an attack, but returned unharmed to Sevastopol on 15 May 2022.

- The Project 23130 replenishment oiler, Vasiliy Nikitin (commissioned April 2025), is reportedly tasked to the Black Sea Fleet but has been built at the Sredne-Nevsky Shipyard in the Baltic and is likely to operate in the Baltic/Atlantic for at least the duration of current hostilities

=== Hydrographic ships: 176th Expeditionary Oceanographic Ship Division ===
For a more complete list of Black Sea Fleet auxiliaries, including hydrographic and rescue vessels, see: List of active Russian Navy ships#Auxiliaries

#	Type	Name	Class	Year	Notes
?	Hydrographic Survey Vessel	Donuzlav	Yug (Project 862)	1983	Active as of 2022

=== 145th Rescue Ship Detachment ===
#	Type	Name	Class	Year	Notes
?	Rescue Tug	Professor Nikolay Muru	Project 22870	2014	Claimed damaged on 13 October 2023 by Ukrainian officials.
?	Rescue Tug	Captain Guryev	Project 22870	2018	Active
?	Rescue Tug	SB-742	Project 22870	2019	Active
?	Rescue Tug	Mikhail Chekov	Project 22870	2024	Launched 21 May 2024

- In March 2017 four Project 22870 tugs were assigned to the Black Sea Fleet: Vasily Bekh, Professor Nikolay Muru, Captain Guryev, and SB-742. Vasily Bekh was given the name Spasatel Vasily Bekh on 19 April 2021. On 17 June 2022, Spasatel Vasily Bekh was sunk by Ukrainian Harpoon anti-ship missiles while on its way to Snake Island in the Black Sea

== Black Sea Fleet naval infantry and coastal defence forces ==
- 854th Coastal Missile Regiment (Sevastopol)
- 11th Coastal Missile-Artillery Brigade – Utash, Krasnodar region: 3–5 Bastion battalions and 1–2 Bal battalions.
- Surface-to-Surface Missiles (included deployed on Crimean peninsula):
  - P-800 Oniks anti-ship missile system
  - Redut
  - Rubezh
  - Bal
  - Bastion-P including silo-based K-300S
  - Object 100 Utes (near Sevastopol)
- Naval Infantry/Special Forces
  - 810th Guards Naval Infantry Brigade As of early October 2025, elements of the brigade reported operating in the region of Oleksiivka in eastern Ukraine.
  - 382nd Naval Infantry Battalion? (Status unclear as of 2021)
  - 388th Maritime Recon Point (Special Forces battalion)

== Black Sea Fleet aviation and air defence forces ==
The 2nd Guards Naval Aviation Division is part of the Black Sea Fleet. The 27th Composite [or "Mixed", depending on translation] Aviation Division is part of the 4th Air and Air Defence Forces Army.

2nd Guards Naval Aviation Division (HQ Sevastopol)

- 43rd Independent Naval Shturmovik [Assault Aviation] Regiment – HQ at Gvardeyskoye, Crimea – 18x Su-24M; 4x Su-24MR (being replaced by Sukhoi Su-30SMs c. 12 Su-30SMs reported active with the regiment as of 2021/22; Ukraine claims seven destroyed as of August 2025; total Russian Su-30M2/SM inventory said to consist of c. 110 aircraft as of mid-2025)
- 318th Mixed Aviation Regiment (Kacha): reportedly An-26, Be-12, and Ka-27 ASW and Ka-29 assault/transport helicopters; airfield reportedly attacked in September 2025; Ukraine claimed (unconfirmed) destruction of two An-26, as well as hits on Be-12 aircraft & Mi-8 helicopters

27th Composite Aviation Division (in Crimea but subordinate to 4th Air and Air Defence Forces Army – Rostov-on-Don)

- 37th Composite Aviation Regiment (Simferopol) (Two Squadrons: Su-24 and Su-25)
  - Reported Russian Su-24 losses said to amount to between 10 and 20 aircraft as of the end of 2024; reserve stocks of approximately 100 Su-24s may allow for losses to be absorbed, though Su-24 operations may have been curtailed due to the aging aircraft's vulnerability
  - Reported Russian Su-25 losses said to amount to c. 33 aircraft as of late 2024; total stocks of 200 Su-25s reported; like Su-24, Su-25 is considered vulnerable in modern combat environment
- 38th Guards Fighter Aviation Regiment (Sevastopol) (Two Squadrons: Su-27/Su-30SM the latter with Oniks (Yakhont) supersonic anti-ship missiles)
- 39th Helicopter Regiment (Dzhankoi) has been equipped with Mi-35M attack helicopters, Ka-52, Mi-28N, and Mi-8AMTSh helicopters (as of 2016); Dzhankoi, also site for S-400 SAM systems, attacked by Ukrainian missile strike in April 2024 (damage unconfirmed)

31st Air Defense Division (HQ: Sevastopol) subordinate to the 4th Air and Air Defense Forces Army (HQ: Rostov-on-Don)

- 12th Anti-Aircraft Missile Regiment
- 18th Anti-Aircraft Missile Regiment
  - Five battalions with S-400 SAM systems (250–400 km range)
  - S-300 long-range surface-to-air missiles with Nebo-M radars.
  - Four battalions: Pantsir-S medium-range SAM
  - Buk SAM system

51st Air Defense Division (HQ: Rostov-on-Don; with S-400, S-300, Pantsir, Buk SAM systems subordinate to 4th Air Army)

- 1537th Anti-Aircraft Rocket Regiment (Novorossiysk, Krasnodar)
- 1721st Anti-Aircraft Rocket Regiment (Sochi; may have started re-equipping with S-350 surface-to-air missile systems in May 2021).
- 1536th Anti-Aircraft Rocket Regiment (Rostov-on-Don)

7th Military Base (Primorskoe, Abkhazia – S-400 and S-300 SAMs)

=== History of the 43rd Guards Naval Assault Aviation Regiment ===
The 43rd Guards Naval Assault Aviation Regiment traces its history to the 43rd Fighter Aviation Regiment (ru:43-й истребительный авиационный полк). The regiment began its formation in May 1938 and was finally formed on 11 or 13 May 1938 in the Kiev Special Military District at Vasylkiv airfield from the 71st, 5th and 109th separate fighter aviation squadrons. It joined the 51st Aviation Brigade of the Air Forces of the Kiev Special Military District.

The regiment's first commander from summer 1938 was Vladimir Sryvkin (ru:Срывкин, Владимир Алексеевич). Major Sryvkin handed over command in 1939 and became assistant commander of the 72nd Fighter Aviation Brigade. In May 1944, he died of wounds received in action.

On 22 June 1941, the regiment was still located at Vasylkiv, forming part of the 36th Fighter Aviation Division of the Air Defence Forces of the Kiev Special Military District.

Over the entire period of its existence, the regiment was repeatedly reorganized and changed its name depending on the honorary titles assigned, awards and changes in the type of aviation:

The 43rd Fighter Aviation Regiment on 9 June 1942 was reorganized into the 43rd Mixed Aviation Regiment. The 43rd Mixed Aviation Regiment was reorganized on 21 June 1942 into the 43rd Fighter Aviation Regiment.[3]

The 43rd Fighter Aviation Sevastopol Red Banner Order of Kutuzov Regiment on 1 April 1960 was renamed the 43rd Aviation Sevastopol Red Banner Order of Kutuzov Regiment of Fighter-Bombers (APIB).

The 43rd Aviation Sevastopol Red Banner Order of Kutuzov Regiment of Fighter-Bombers, after being included in the Air Force of the Red Banner Black Sea Fleet on 1 December 1990, was renamed the 43rd Separate Naval Assault Aviation Sevastopol Red Banner Order of Kutuzov Regiment.

In connection with the reduction of the Russian Air Force, the 43rd Separate Marine Assault Aviation Sevastopol Red Banner Order of Kutuzov Regiment was reorganized on 1 October 1995 into the 43rd Separate Marine Assault Aviation Sevastopol Red Banner Order of Kutuzov Squadron.

In December 2004, the squadron was upgraded to a regiment once again. The 43rd separate naval assault aviation Sevastopol Red Banner Order of Kutuzov Regiment in connection with the ongoing reform of the RF Armed Forces in 2009 was renamed the 7058th Aviation Sevastopol Red Banner Order of Kutuzov Naval Aviation Base of the Russian Federation.

The 43rd separate naval assault aviation Sevastopol Red Banner Order of Kutuzov Naval Aviation Regiment of the Black Sea Fleet of the Russian Federation was re-formed in 2014 at the Novofedorovka airfield near the city of Saki.

The regiment was part of the "active army" (in front-line combat service) for six periods between 22 July 1941 and 9 May 1945.

== Incidents ==
The Russian Black Sea Fleet's (BSF) use of leased facilities in Sevastopol and the Crimea was sometimes controversial. A number of incidents took place:

- For security reasons, the BSF refused to allow Ukrainians to inspect its aircraft cargo, after allegations by Ukrainians that they could be carrying nuclear weapons, which would have infringed upon Ukraine's status under the Nuclear Non-Proliferation Treaty (NPT)
- The BSF transported rockets repeatedly through the port of Sevastopol without seeking permission from Ukrainian authorities.
- A lighthouse is located on the headland which, starting in 2005, was the subject of a controversy between Ukraine and Russia. From 3 August 2005, the lighthouse was occupied by the Russian military. Despite a controversial ruling by a Court in Sevastopol on the subject, Russian military officials referred to the fact that they only took orders from the chief of the Russian Navy headquarters and no one else. Ukrainian activists complained that Sarych was illegally occupied by the Russian Navy. As a military facility, the territory around the Sarych headland is closed to trespassers with barbed wire, and the Russian flag flew over Sarych.
- 20 June 2009 – In Sevastopol, a Russian fleet servicemen allegedly used physical force against 30 civilians. The city also alleges contract violations by the Construction Management Corporation of the Black Sea Fleet for not following through on promises to construct requested commercial housing after taking advance payment. The city began talks with the President and the Prime Minister of the Russian Federation, Dmitry Medvedev and Vladimir Putin, and also to the Russian Minister of Defense Anatoliy Serdyukov with respect to the contract violations, but those did not yield results.
- On 27 August 2009, Russian marines successfully prevented Ukrainian bailiffs from enforcing a Ukrainian court ruling on seizing lighthouses belonging to the BSF. The Ukrainian Foreign Ministry described the Russian obstruction as a "disregard for Ukrainian legislation and international agreements".
- On 16 April 2013, a "high-ranking Russian Defense Ministry official" complained to Interfax that "Ukraine's stubborn position" was slowing the cancellation of customs payments (for the fleet) and that Ukraine still upheld (former) Ukrainian President Viktor Yushchenko's 2008 decrees that banned the "relaxed procedure" of BSF formations crossing the Ukrainian border.
- In the late hours of 13 April 2022 Ukrainian presidential adviser Oleksiy Arestovych reported Moskva was on fire and Odesa governor Maksym Marchenko said their forces hit Moskva with two R-360 Neptune anti-ship missiles.
- On 22 September 2023, Ukraine hit the headquarters of the BSF using a Storm Shadow missile, killing at least 6 people.
- on 1 February 2024, Ukraine released video purported to show the sinking of the Tarantul-class vessel Ivanovets by unmanned surface vehicle.
- On 5 March 2024, the Sergey Kotov patrol vessel was sunk using Magura V5 naval drone.
- On 23 March 2024, The defense forces of Ukraine hit the Russian large amphibious Ropucha-class landing ships Yamal. According to Ukraine's military intelligence, the Yamal warship suffered critical damage: a hole in the upper deck caused it to roll to the starboard side.
- On 19 May 2024, Ukrainian forces destroyed the Project 22800 Karakurt class Tsiklon missile corvette in the port of Sevastopol with ATACMS missiles.
- On 12 November 2024, Valery Trankovsky, Captain of the 1st Rank and chief of staff of a missile boat brigade, was killed in a car bomb explosion in Crimea. The Russian government opened a terrorism investigation.

== See also ==
- Azov-Black Sea Flotilla
- Black Sea Fleet electoral district (Russian Constituent Assembly election, 1917)
- List of ship losses during the Russo-Ukrainian War
- Black Sea Fleet dispute
