= Russian submarine Novorossiysk =

Russian Project 636.3 attack submarine

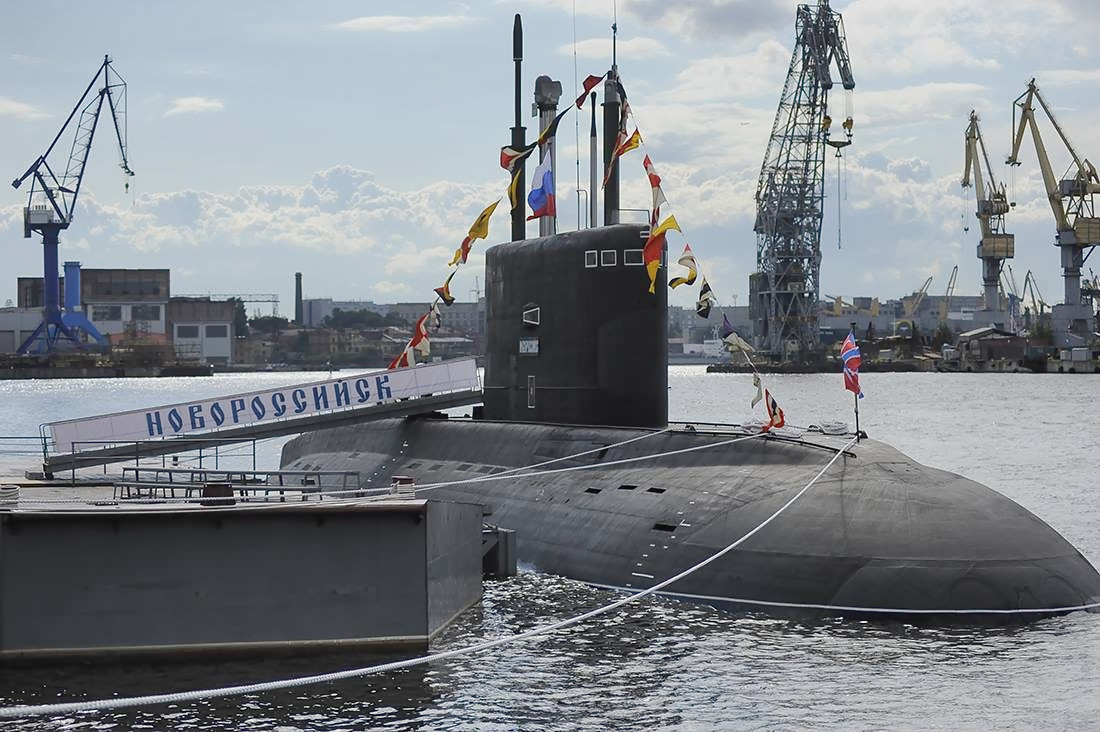
- Novorossiysk in 2015

History

Russia
- Name: Novorossiysk (B-261)
- Namesake: Novorossiysk
- Builder: Admiralty Shipyards
- Laid down: August 2010
- Launched: 28 November 2013
- Commissioned: 22 August 2014
- Status: in active service

General characteristics
- Class & type: Kilo-class submarine
- Displacement: 2,350 t (2,310 long tons) surfaced; 3,100 t (3,100 long tons)
- Length: 74 metres (242 ft 9 in)
- Beam: 9.9 metres (32 ft 6 in)
- Draft: 6.1 metres (20 ft 0 in)
- Propulsion: Diesel-electric propulsion; 2 × diesel generators; 1 × electric motor; 1 × shaft
- Endurance: 45 days
- Test depth: 300 m (984 ft 3 in)
- Complement: 52 officers and sailors
- Armament: 6 × 553 mm (21.8 in) torpedo tubes

Novorossiysk B-261 (Russian: Б-261 «Новороссийск») is the lead ship of the Project 636.3 (NATO reporting name Improved Kilo II-class) diesel-electric attack submarine of the Russian Navy. It was laid down at the Admiralty Shipyards in Saint Petersburg in August 2010, launched on 28 November 2013, and commissioned on 22 August 2014. Novorossiysk is assigned to the Black Sea Fleet.

It was deployed in support of the Russian intervention in the Syrian civil war as part of the Mediterranean Sea Task Force more than once. When the Russian invasion of Ukraine broke out in 2022, it was in the Mediterranean and unable to return to its base in the Black Sea because Turkey closed the Bosphorus to military vessels. Since then it has been based out of the Baltic Sea.

== Design ==
The Rubin Design Bureau began the design of the Project 877 (NATO reporting name Kilo-class) diesel-electric attack submarine for the Soviet Navy in 1974. In the 1990s the original design received upgrades to its stealth, propulsion, and automation, designated Project 636 (Improved Kilo class). Beginning in 2010, further design changes led to the Project 636.3 (Improved Kilo II class). The Improved Kilo II has a displacement of 2,350 tonnes (2,310 long tons) while surfaced and 3,100 tonnes (3,100 long tons) while under water. It has a length of 74 metres (242 ft 9 in), a beam of 9.9 metres (32 ft 6 in), and a draft of 6.1 metres (20 ft 0 in).

With diesel-electric propulsion, its single propeller shaft is driven by an electric motor, powered by two diesel generators, which give it a speed of 17 kn (31 km/h; 20 mph) on the surface or 20 kn (37 km/h; 23 mph) submerged. The submarine has a crew of 52 officers and sailors and can stay at sea for 45 days. Its maximum diving depth is reported as 300 metres (984 ft 3 in). The armament consists of six 553 mm (21.8 in) torpedo tubes, which can launch torpedoes, naval mines, or missiles. Some Improved Kilo II submarines are armed with variants of the Kalibr cruise missile, being able to hold up to four of them. Alternatively, they can hold up to 18 torpedoes or 24 naval mines.

== History ==
Novorossiysk, the lead ship of the Improved Kilo II class, was laid down in August 2010 at the Admiralty Shipyards in Saint Petersburg, launched on 28 November 2013, and commissioned on 22 August 2014. It was part of the first batch of six Improved Kilo II submarines, which were built for the Black Sea Fleet, and formed its 4th Independent Submarine Brigade.

From November 2015, Novorossiysk carried out training exercises in the Barents Sea. On 4 August 2015 it launched cruise missiles at the Chizha test range in the Arkhangelsk Oblast. After finishing tests with the Northern Fleet it departed for the Black Sea. The submarine stopped at the Spanish port of Ceuta from 26 to 28 August 2015, causing some controversy in the United Kingdom due to its proximity to Gibraltar. British MP Andrew Rosindell criticized Spain over the decision, to which the Spanish foreign ministry answered that it was normal for Russian ships to dock at Ceuta. It arrived at its base in Novorossiysk on 21 September, and visited Sevastopol on 28 September.

After it was deployed with the Mediterranean Sea Task Force in support of the Russian intervention in the Syrian civil war, Novorossiysk received a refit from February 2021. When the Russian invasion of Ukraine broke out in 2022, Novorossiysk was again in the Mediterranean, along with another boat of its class, Stary Oskol. They were prevented from returning to the Black Sea by Turkey, which closed the Bosphorus to military vessels when the war began. Because of this, it went to Kronstadt after its deployment, where it went another refit, and it was reported in August 2023 that the submarine would return to service in April 2024. In September 2024 Novorossiysk again deployed into the Mediterranean, being sent to the Tartus naval base in Syria and relieving another submarine of the same class, Ufa. After a naval exercise in the Mediterranean in December 2024, in the context of the fall of the Assad regime that same month, it left the region in early January 2025 instead of returning to the base at Tartus. Novorossiysk entered the Mediterranean again in June 2025.

In September 2025, after the Russian loss of the Tartus naval base in Syria, Novorossiysk had to surface while on duty in the Mediterranean and make the trip home to the Baltic Sea on the surface due to a mechanical failure on the submarine and a lack of Russian maintenance facilities in the Mediterranean Sea area. The Telegram channel VChK-OGPU claimed that the submarine was having a serious technical problem with diesel leaking from the fuel system into the submarine crewed area, and that a lack of parts or on-board qualified personnel prevented a repair. Naval News reported that the larger problem for Russia is not a single diesel-electric submarine, but rather "since losing its Syrian base at Tartus in 2024 and facing restrictions on movement through the Bosporus, Russia’s Mediterranean task force has largely collapsed."
