= Mediterranean Sea Task Force =

Permanent task force of the Russian Navy in the Mediterranean Sea
- Active: 2013–present
- Country: Russia
- Allegiance: Russian Armed Forces
- Branch: Russian Navy
- Role: Naval warfare Amphibious warfare Naval presence/diplomacy
- Size: up to 15 warships at times prior to 2024; significantly fewer in 2025/26; none as of mid-2026
- Headquarters: Sevastopol; Severomorsk
- Engagements: Syrian Civil War (Russian intervention)

Commanders
- Current commander: Captain 1st rank Pavel Prosekov (interim)

The permanent task force of the Russian Navy in the Mediterranean Sea (Russian: Постоянное оперативное соединение Военно-морского флота Российской Федерации в Средиземном море) is a task force of the Russian Navy responsible for projecting Russian power in the Middle East through the Mediterranean Sea.

The Soviet Navy's 5th Operational Squadron had fulfilled a similar role from its formation in 1967 to its deactivation on 31 December 1992. The present permanent task force was established in 2013.

In September 2013, the Russian Ministry of Defence re-established a fleet in the Mediterranean using a combination of ships from the Black Sea Fleet and Northern Fleet stationed in Syria. Historically, it has comprised up to 15 warships and auxiliary vessels with vessels from the Baltic Fleet also providing contingents for operations in the region. However, with the loss of regular use of Russian naval facilities in Syria, during 2025, these numbers were significantly lower by early 2026.

In mid-2026 it was reported that there were no major Russian warships currently in the Mediterranean. Nevertheless, in August 2026 it was announced that an agreement had been signed between Russia and Syria governing future Russian use of the bases although Russia also seemed increasingly to be looking at the ports of Tobruk in Libya as well as Algiers as more consistent ports of call.

== Historic deployments ==
Between December 2007–February 2008, the Russian Navy made the first large deployment to the Mediterranean Sea in 15 years. The task force included Northern Fleet's aircraft carrier Admiral Kuznetsov, destroyers Admiral Levchenko and Admiral Chabanenko and Black Sea Fleet's cruiser Moskva. Vice-Admiral Nikolai Maksimov, the Northern Fleet commander, said during the operations that "After this visit to the Mediterranean and France, the first in 15 years, we will establish a constant presence in the region".

In 2013, the Russian naval presence in the Mediterranean Sea was formed by Black Sea Fleet's cruiser Moskva (5 July–12 July) and Northern Fleet's destroyers Vice-Admiral Kulakov (4 June–17 July) and Severomorsk (January–June).

With the start of the military operation of the Russian Aerospace Forces in Syria on 30 September 2015, the formation took part in this operation, covering the airborne forces of the Russian Aerospace Forces in Syria and the Khmeimim Air Base at which it is deployed. The main objective of the formation was to ensure the activities of the Russian troops in Syria. Presently, it continues to facilitate and replenish Russian forces stationed there and also help out with any search and rescue operations in its area of responsibility.

=== 2013 ===
In September 2013, the permanent task force was formed. It was temporarily strengthened by Moskva (11 September–18 November), Northern Fleet's heavy cruiser Pyotr Velikiy (2 November–8 May 2014) and Pacific Fleet's cruiser Varyag (2 November–unknown) and destroyer Admiral Panteleyev (2 November–November).

=== 2014 ===
In 2014, the task force was temporarily strengthened by Black Sea Fleet's cruiser Moskva (6 September–18 January 2015), Northern Fleet's aircraft carrier Admiral Kuznetsov (10 January–8 May), heavy cruiser Pyotr Velikiy (2 November 2013–8 May 2014), destroyers Admiral Levchenko (10 January–30 June), Vice-Admiral Kulakov (28 April–December) and Severomorsk (28 November–10 April 2015) and Baltic Fleet's frigate Yaroslav Mudry (August–16 February 2015).

=== 2015 ===
In 2015, the task force was temporarily strengthened by Black Sea Fleet's cruiser Moskva (6 September 2014–18 January, 1 June–18 August and 25 September–9 January 2016) and Northern Fleet's destroyers Severomorsk (28 November 2014–10 April 2015) and Vice-Admiral Kulakov (November–25 March 2016) and Baltic Fleet's frigate Yaroslav Mudry (August 2014–16 February 2015).

=== 2016 ===
In 2016, the task force was temporarily strengthened by Black Sea Fleet's cruiser Moskva (25 September 2015–9 January 2016), Pacific Fleet's cruiser Varyag (3 January 2016–spring), Baltic Fleet's frigate Yaroslav Mudry (11 June–9 October) and Northern Fleet's aircraft carrier Admiral Kuznetsov, heavy cruiser Pyotr Velikiy (both 26 October–20 January 2017) and destroyers Severomorsk (26 October–24 May 2017) and Vice-Admiral Kulakov (November 2015–25 March 2016 and 26 October–6 December).

The mainstay of the task force were Black Sea Fleet's frigates Ladny (5 May–10 June), Pytlivy (25 May–1 July and 6 August–28 November) and Admiral Grigorovich (May–9 June and 24 September–6 October) as well as destroyer Smetlivy (7 March–9 June and 25 October–5 March 2017).

Between October 2016–January 2017, the Russian Navy intervened in the Syrian Civil War during the Battle of Aleppo deploying a carrier strike group centered around the Northern Fleet's aircraft carrier Admiral Kuznetsov, which included heavy cruiser Pyotr Velikiy, destroyers Severomorsk and Vice-Admiral Kulakov and likely a nuclear submarine. The Admiral Kuznetsov's airwing, composed of 6-8 Su-33s and 4 MiG-29Ks flew missions in Syria. A Su-33 and a MiG-29K were lost due to malfunctions of the arresting wires, with pilots being safely rescued.

=== 2017 ===
In 2017, the task force was temporarily strengthened by Northern Fleet's aircraft carrier Admiral Kuznetsov, heavy cruiser Pyotr Velikiy (both 26 October 2016–20 January 2017) and destroyers Severomorsk (26 October 2016–24 May 2017) and Vice-Admiral Kulakov (8 August–4 November), as well as Baltic Fleet's corvettes Soobrazitelny and Boikiy (29 October–December).

=== 2018 ===
In 2018, the task force was temporarily strengthened by Northern Fleet's cruiser Marshal Ustinov (11 August–12 November) and destroyer Severomorsk (11 August–3 May 2019) as well as Baltic Fleet's frigate Yaroslav Mudry (26 April–October).

Between 1–8 September, the largest Russian post-Cold war naval exercise in the Mediterranean Sea was conducted. Dubbed Ocean shield, it was the first iteration of Ocean shield exercises, which were in the next two years held in the Baltic Sea. 26 ships, 2 submarines and 34 aircraft were included. Among participants were cruiser Marshal Ustinov, destroyers Smetlivy and Severomorsk, frigates Admiral Grigorovich, Admiral Essen, Admiral Makarov, Pytlivy and Yaroslav Mudry, corvettes Vishny Volochyok, Grad Sviyazhsk and Veliky Ustyug and conventional submarines Kolpino and Velikiy Novgorod.

Aircraft present included Tu-160 bombers, Tu-142 and Il-38 anti-submarine aircraft and Su-33 and MiG-29K maritime fighters. This was the largest Russian naval exercise in the Mediterranean Sea of the post-Cold War era and the largest Russian post-Cold War naval exercise in the far sea zone. In terms of distant location and number of capital ships participating it's comparable only to June 2021 exercises of the Pacific Fleet off the Hawaii islands.

=== 2019 ===
In 2019, the task force was temporarily strengthened by Northern Fleet's cruiser Marshal Ustinov (22 August–30 October and 18 December–28 January 2020), destroyers Vice-Admiral Kulakov (December 2019–January 2020) and Severomorsk (11 August 2018–3 May 2019) and frigate Admiral Gorshkov (10–20 March).

=== 2020 ===
In 2020, the task force was temporarily strengthened by Northern Fleet's cruiser Marshal Ustinov (18 December 2019–28 January 2020) and destroyer Vice-Admiral Kulakov (December 2019–January 2020 and 6 August–8 November), as well as Baltic Fleet's frigate Yaroslav Mudry (March–April).

The mainstay of the Squadron were Black Sea Fleet's frigates Admiral Grigorovich (28 February–26 June and 29 December 2020–8 May 2021), Admiral Essen (21 December 2019–11 April and 29 September–28 December) and Admiral Makarov (28 February–11 April and 24 June–19 October).

Naval units were supported by aircraft operating from the Khmeimim Air Base in Syria. Units deployed included Tu-22M3 Backfire bombers as well as Su-24s, Su-35s, MiG-31s and Tu-142MK and Il-38 anti-submarine warfare aircraft.

=== 2021 ===
In 2021, the task force was temporarily strengthened by Baltic Fleet's corvette Stoikiy (29 December 2020–19 April 2021), Northern Fleet's frigate Admiral Kasatonov (14 January–1 April) and destroyer Vice-Admiral Kulakov (18 August–23 September) and Black Sea Fleet's cruiser Moskva (18 June–5 July). In the summer, corvette Gremyashchiy and submarines Petropavlovsk-Kamchatsky and Volkhov transited the Mediterranean Sea on their way from the Baltic Sea to the Pacific Ocean.

The mainstay of the Squadron were Black Sea Fleet's frigates Admiral Grigorovich (24 December 2020–8 May 2021 and 28 October–), Admiral Makarov (2 May–13 August) and Admiral Essen (18 June–5 July and 7 August–30 October).

On 25 May 2021, three Tu-22Ms maritime bombers were deployed to the Khmeymim airbase in Syria for the first time. The deployment took place after a significant boost in NATO amphibious capability in the Mediterranean earlier in 2021. French aircraft carrier Charles de Gaulle has left Toulon for a deployment in the Persian Gulf via the eastern Mediterranean in mid-February. American aircraft carrier USS Dwight D. Eisenhower conducted an exercise with the French helicopter carrier Tonerre off Greece in March and, in May, British aircraft carrier HMS Queen Elizabeth embarked on a maiden voyage to the Indian Ocean via the Mediterranean, where it will hold exercises with Charles de Gaulle.

On 25 June 2021, two anti-ship interceptors MiG-31K, armed with Kinzhal missiles were deployed to Khmeymim airbase for the first time and fired Kinzhal in an exercise the same day. They participated in a large-scale anti-ship exercise, which included cruiser Moskva, frigates Admiral Essen and Admiral Makarov and submarines Stary Oskol and Rostov-on-Don, three bombers Tu-22M3, as well as anti-submarine aircraft Il-38 and Tu-142.

The newest air defence system S-500 was reportedly tested at Khmeymim airbase and obtained a lock on a F-35 fighter from the HMS Queen Elizabeth. The exercise included rocket fire 30 km away from the HMS Queen Elizabeth. The exercise took place during the deployment of the British aircraft carrier HMS Queen Elizabeth to the Eastern Mediterranean and have coincided with aircraft carrier USS Dwight D. Eisenhower reentering the Mediterranean Sea after three months in the Indian Ocean through the Suez Canal on 1 July.

On 16 November, British aircraft carrier HMS Queen Elizabeth reentered the Mediterranean Sea through the Suez Canal. Since the only Russian large surface combatant present in the area Admiral Grigorovich was in the western Mediterranean Sea, taking part in Russo-Algerian naval exercise between 16 and 17 November, it's unclear whether Russia sent any ship at all to shadow the aircraft carrier, except for the airplanes. On 23 November, Admiral Grigorovich was already reported off Tartus.

=== 2022 ===
During 2022, known Russian naval forces deployed with the task force reportedly included:

- two Improved Kilo-class submarines (Novorossiysk (B-261) and Krasnodar (B-265)); Novorossiysk redeployed to the Baltic for maintenance as of September 2022
- at least one Russian nuclear-powered submarine (later reported to be the Yasen-class submarine Severodvinsk) entered the Mediterranean in August 2022
- two Slava-class cruisers (Varyag and Marshal Ustinov; Marshal Ustinov was reported to have left the Mediterranean in August 2022, likely returning to her home base on the Kola Peninsula while Varyag departed the Mediterranean in October via the Suez canal likely returning to the Pacific).
- two Udaloy-class destroyers (Admiral Tributs and Vice-Admiral Kulakov - Vice-Admiral Kulakov departed the Mediterranean, in company with Marshal Ustinov, late August 2022 while Admiral Tributs departed the Mediterranean in company with Varyag in October 2022)
- the frigate Admiral Kasatonov (departed the Mediterranean, March 2023)
- the frigate Admiral Gorshkov (entered the Mediterranean via the Suez Canal, April 2023)
- the frigate Admiral Grigorovich (departed the Mediterranean for the Baltic April 2023)
- the Steregushchiy-class corvettes Soobrazitelny and Stoikiy (entered the Mediterranean in October 2022; departed the Mediterranean for the Baltic April 2023)
- the Buyan-M-class corvette Orekhovo-Zuyevo
- Additional mine warfare units/auxiliaries.

In 2022, the Russian Navy operated in the Adriatic Sea for the first time since 1995 Volk's deployment amid US bombardment of Bosnia and Herzegovina. In late July, destroyer Admiral Tributs operated off Šibenik, intelligence ship Vasily Tatishchev operated near island Palagruža, cruiser Varyag operated near Durrës, while frigate Admiral Grigorovich remained just outside the Adriatic Sea. As the US carrier Truman was located in the Adriatic Sea at the same time, there were reports in media about Russian warships simulating blocking the US carrier in the Adriatic Sea.

In August 2022, Russia deployed Severodvinsk to the Mediterranean Sea, making it the first Russian nuclear submarine in the Mediterranean since Kursk and Tomsk in 1999.

=== Role in the 2022 Russian invasion of Ukraine ===
In conjunction with a build-up of Russian forces around Ukraine and in Belarus, Russia began to reinforce the task force in the Mediterranean toward the end of 2021. The principal movements involved the deployment of two Slava-class cruisers - Marshal Ustinov from the Northern Fleet and Varyag from the Pacific Fleet - to the Mediterranean, together with additional escorts. At the same time, the submarine Rostov Na Donu returned to the Black Sea from the Mediterranean just prior to the outbreak of hostilities. The movements strengthened Russian anti-surface group capabilities in the Mediterranean prior to the outbreak of war. Simultaneously, Bastion-P anti-ship missile batteries were installed at the Russian base in Syria to improve its defensive capabilities.

On 28 February 2022, four days after the outbreak of hostilities, Turkey indicated that it was closing the Dardanelles Straits to all foreign warships for the duration of the conflict. Turkish Foreign Minister, Mevlüt Çavuşoğlu, argued that the move was consistent with terms of the Montreaux Convention of 1936. An exception would be allowed for Russian ships returning from the Mediterranean to Black Sea bases where they were registered. The move limited Russia's ability to reinforce its naval units in the Mediterranean from the Black Sea though it also effectively confined NATO naval forces to the Mediterranean.

=== 2023 ===
The Russian missile corvette Mercury 734, which is the fifth ship in Project 20380 built at the Severnaya shipyard, visited the Port of Algiers in August 2023. This visit heralded increased collaboration between governments. Russia hopes to invest the Sahel region by this means.

Russia began a gradual withdrawal of its main warships from the Mediterranean since summer 2022. As of 15 October 2023, the number of Russian warships was six in October 2023. As of then, it included two missile corvettes, one anti-submarine warfare boat, one reconnaissance ship, one supply tanker and one floating shipyard. One analyst concluded that "Russia no longer considers the prospect of the group’s passing through the Turkish Straits realistic".

=== 2024 ===
The Improved Kilo II submarine Ufa from the Pacific Fleet was assigned to the task force for most of 2024, being deployed there from 16 December 2023 until 29 September 2024. It was replaced by Novorossiysk, which had previously been in the Baltic Sea.

=== Status as of 2025/26 ===
As of mid-2025, the loss of the Russian base at the port of Tartus in Syria, as a result of the Fall of the Assad regime in late 2024, has significantly impacted the ability of the Russian navy to maintain an effective presence in the Mediterranean region. The closure of the Turkish Straits as a result of the Russo-Ukraine War has also negatively impacted the ability of the Russian navy to support its naval forces from its ports in the Black Sea. This has compelled the Russian navy to sustain its forces by drawing on units based in its Baltic and Northern fleets.

Whereas previously the Russian naval task force in the Mediterranean comprised up to fifteen warships and auxiliaries, as of mid-2025 the only major units operating in the region were the Project 636.3 submarine Novorossiysk (B-261), the frigate Admiral Grigorovich and one Steregushchiy-class multi-role corvette. Russia's naval presence in the Mediterranean reportedly suffered a further setback in September when Novorossiysk sustained serious damage as the result of a fuel system malfunction. As of mid-2025, Russia and Syria were reportedly engaged in negotiations about the future of Russian naval and air facilities in the country though it remained unclear how extensive Russia's military presence in Syria would be going forward.

With the October surface-return of Novorossiysk to the Baltic due to mechanical failure and a lack of maintenance facilities in the Mediterranean, Naval News reported that the problem for Russia is not merely a single diesel-electric submarine, but rather "since losing its Syrian base at Tartus in 2024 and facing restrictions on movement through the Bosporus, Russia’s Mediterranean task force has largely collapsed."

As of March 2026, the Russian naval presence in the Mediterranean was limited to the Corvette Stoikiy and the submarine Krasnodar which herself departed the Mediterranean later in the month. Some limited Russian use of the Tartus facility appeared to have been restored. In early 2026, Stoykiy was reported to be using the facility more regularly, including wharfs previously reserved for the Russian Mediterranean Flotilla.

However, Russia also seemed increasingly to be looking at the ports of Tobruk in Libya as well as Algiers as more consistent ports of call. For a short period in mid-2026 it was reported that there were no Russian warships in the Mediterranean. However, in August 2026, the destroyer Admiral Levchenko was reported in the Mediterranean accompanying the oil product tanker General Skobelev, the cargo vessel Sparta, and the Russian Navy oiler Akademik Pashin. They were reported destined for the Syrian port of Tartus.

== Commanders ==
- Captain of the First Rank Yuri Zemsky (2013–2014)
- Captain of the First Rank Aleksandr Okun (2015–2016)
- Captain of the First Rank Pavel Yasnitsky (2016–?)
- Captain of the First Rank Pavel Prosekov (interim) (2020–2021)
