= Russian landing ship Kaliningrad =

Russian Navy landing ship

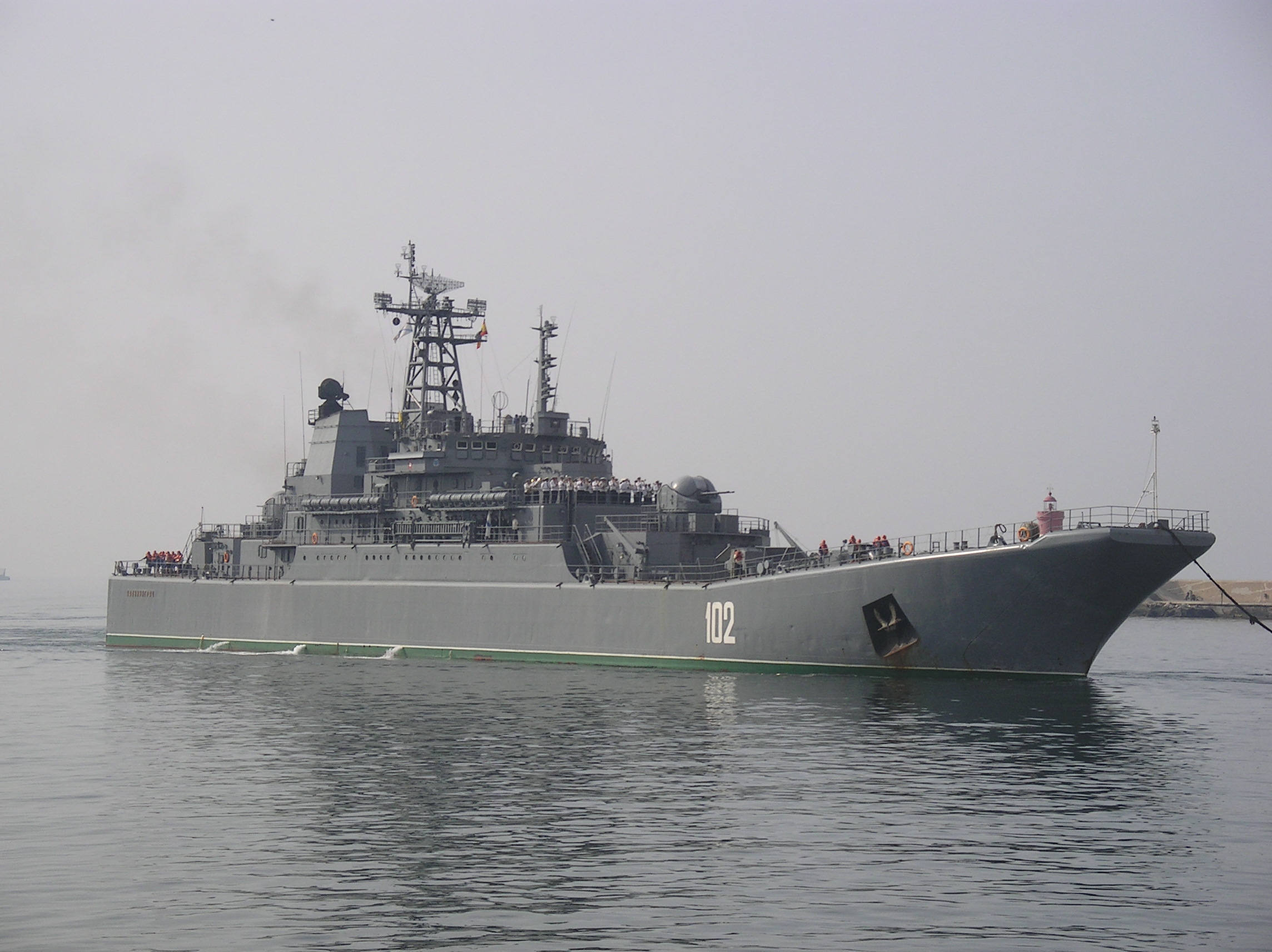
- Kaliningrad c. 2004 in Cartagena, Spain

History

Russia
- Name: BDK-58 (1984-1999); Kaliningrad (1999-present)
- Namesake: Kaliningrad
- Builder: Stocznia Północna, Gdańsk, Poland
- Laid down: 31 May 1984
- Launched: 1984
- Commissioned: 9 December 1984
- Home port: Baltiysk
- Identification: Hull number: 123 (1984-1987); 122 (1987-1990); 102 (1990-present)
- Status: In service

General characteristics
- Class & type: Ropucha-class landing ship
- Displacement: 3,450 t (3,396 long tons) standard; 4,080 t (4,016 long tons) full load
- Length: 112.5 m (369 ft 1 in)
- Beam: 15.01 m (49 ft 3 in)
- Draught: 4.26 m (14 ft 0 in)
- Ramps: Over bows and at stern
- Installed power: 3 × 750 kW (1,006 hp) diesel generators
- Propulsion: 2 × 9,600 hp (7,159 kW) Zgoda-Sulzer 16ZVB40/48 diesel engines
- Speed: 18 knots (33 km/h; 21 mph)
- Range: 6,000 nmi (11,000 km; 6,900 mi) at 12 knots (22 km/h; 14 mph); 3,500 nmi (6,500 km; 4,000 mi) at 16 knots (30 km/h; 18 mph)
- Endurance: 30 days
- Capacity: 10 × main battle tanks and 340 troops or 12 × BTR APC and 340 troops or 3 × main battle tanks, 3 × 2S9 Nona-S SPG, 5 × MT-LB APC, 4 trucks and 313 troops or 500 tons of cargo
- Complement: 98
- Armament: 2 × AK-725 twin 57 mm (2.2 in) DP guns; 4 × 8 Strela 2 SAM launchers; 2 × 22 A-215 Grad-M rocket launchers

Kaliningrad (Russian: Калининград) is a Ropucha-class landing ship of the Russian Navy and part of the Baltic Fleet.

Named after the city of Kaliningrad, the ship was built in Poland and launched in 1984. She was named BDK-58 (Russian: БДК-58) for Russian: Большой десантный корабль, romanized: Bolshoy desantnyi korabl', lit. 'large landing ship', from her construction until being renamed Kaliningrad in 1999. She is one of the subtype of the Ropucha-class landing ships, designated Project 775/II by the Russian Navy.

== Construction and commissioning ==
Kaliningrad was built as BDK-58 by Stocznia Północna, part of Gdańsk Shipyard, in Gdańsk, in what was then the Polish People's Republic. She was laid down on 31 May 1984, and launched in 1984. She was commissioned into the Soviet Navy on 9 December 1984 as part of its Baltic Fleet, homeported in Baltiysk, and with the dissolution of the Soviet Union in late December 1991, she went on to serve in the Russian Navy.

== Career ==
In service since 1984 as BDK-58, she was renamed Kaliningrad on 30 April 1999. Kaliningrad was a regular participant in the international BALTOPS naval exercises during the 2000s, taking parting in the 2003, 2004, 2005, 2006, and 2008 exercises. She also carried out long-distance voyages, entering the Atlantic and Mediterranean in 2006, paying visits to ports in Tunisia, Algeria, Spain and Portugal. Another international cruise in mid-2009 involved visits to Kiel in Germany, and Den Helder in the Netherlands. She also attended the August 2010 celebrations for the 500th anniversary of the Royal Danish Navy. In June 2012, she was again part of the annual BALTOPS exercises.

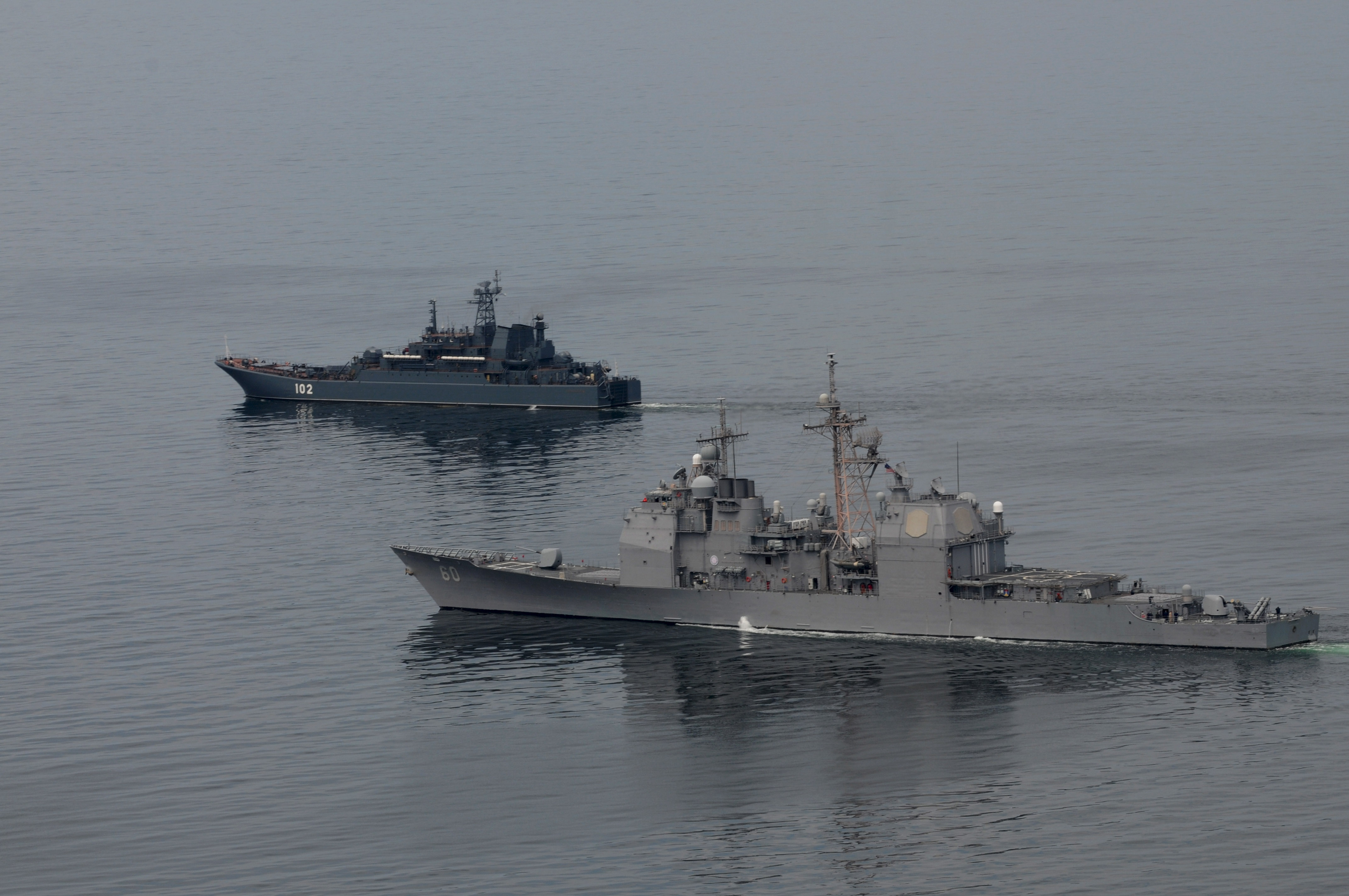
Kaliningrad and USS Normandy conduct anti-piracy training during BALTOPS 2012

By December 2012, Kaliningrad was under the command of Captain 3rd rank Georgy Degtyarev, when she deployed with the tanker Kola on an 8-month voyage from the Baltic to the Mediterranean, Aegean and Black Seas. She covered more than 32 thousand nautical miles, and made a port visit to Beirut in Lebanon. She also conducted exercises during the deployment, which lasted until August 2013. She transported troops and equipment of the Belarusian Armed Forces to Baltiysk on 18 September 2013 for the Zapad 2013 exercises. On 24 December 2013, she deployed once more to the Mediterranean, undertaking a nearly year-long mission, lasting until 2 December 2014.

In 2016, Kaliningrad began repairs and modernization at the 33 Ship Repair Facility in Baltiysk which lasted two years. She began post-refit sea trials in June 2018. She was accepted back into service by 2019, and in November 2019, carried out gunnery exercises with the corvette Stoiky in the Baltic Sea. She and Stoikiy returned to Baltiysk on 15 November 2019, having spent more than 30 days at sea, travelling more than 4,000 miles. In December 2019, Kaliningrad was named the best ship in her class by the Baltic Fleet's Military Council. In February 2020, she carried out exercises with her sister ship Minsk, with the corvette Boiky joining the following month. Later in March, Kaliningrad, Minsk, and Boiky entered the North Sea for further exercises. By July, Kaliningrad was back in the Baltic, conducting landing exercises with the Zubr-class air-cushioned landing craft Yevgeny Kocheshkov and Dyugon-class landing craft. The following month she took part in the Ocean Shield exercises at the Khmelevka training ground, with other Baltic Fleet units.

In March 2021, Kaliningrad and her sister ships Minsk and Korolyov, and the corvette Boikiy entered the Atlantic. Kaliningrad and Korolyov entered the Mediterranean Sea on 25 March, while Boikiy and Minsk returned to the Baltic Sea on 27 March. Kaliningrad was back in the Baltic by December that year, when she took part in gunnery exercises.

In mid-January 2022 Kaliningrad and two other Baltic Fleet landing ships, the Ropucha-class vessels Korolyov and Minsk, set sail for the Mediterranean Sea. En route they joined up with two Ropucha-class vessels, Olenegorsky Gornyak and Georgy Pobedonosets, and the Ivan Gren-class Pyotr Morgunov sailing from the Northern Fleet. The six ships were shadowed on their voyage by NATO vessels, including as they passed through the English Channel by HMS Dragon and HMS Tyne. After calling at the Tartus naval base for replenishment, the ships entered the Black Sea on 8 and 9 February, nominally for exercises with the Black Sea Fleet. The Barents Observer reported that the ships were heavily loaded and low in the water, and carrying equipment and troops. On 12 July 2023, Kaliningrad and her sister ship Olenegorsky Gornyak were reported to be acting as ferries at the request of the Ministry of Transport, conveying motor vehicles across the Kerch Strait to ease holiday traffic on the Crimean Bridge.
