= Russian landing ship Georgy Pobedonosets =

Russian Navy landing ship

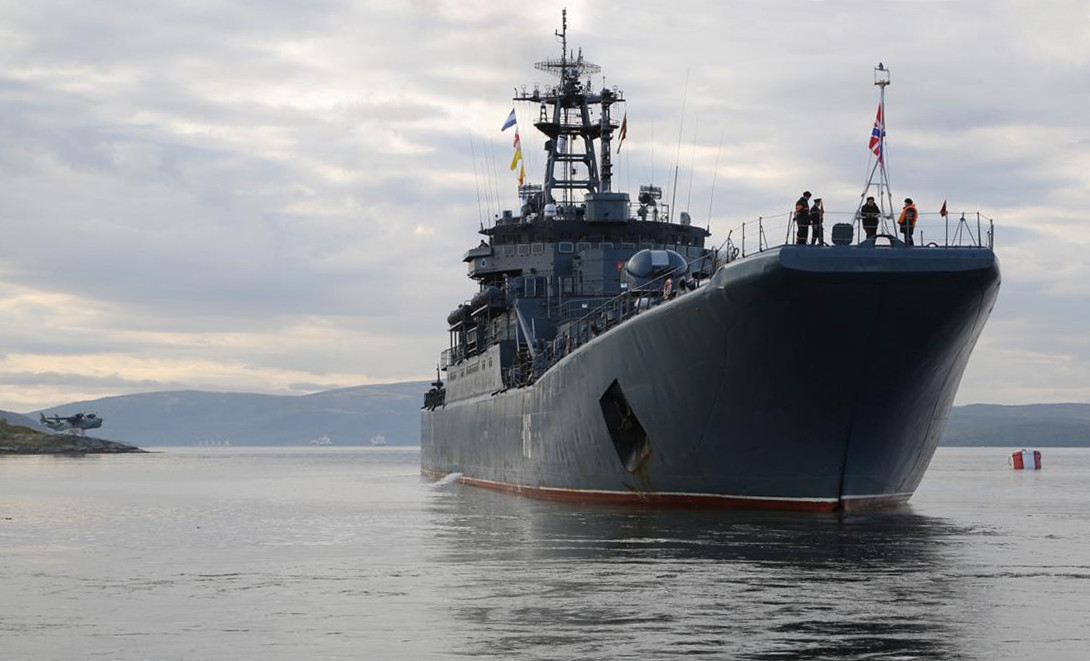

History

Russia
- Name: BDK-45 (1984-2002); Georgy Pobedonosets (2002-present)
- Namesake: Saint George
- Builder: Stocznia Północna, Gdańsk, Poland
- Laid down: 10 December 1983
- Launched: 29 June 1984
- Commissioned: 5 March 1985
- Home port: Severomorsk
- Identification: Hull number: 123 (1984-1985); 133 (1985-1986); 135 (1986); 018 (1986-1987); 023 (1987-1990); 036 (1990-1999); 010 (1999); 016 (1999-present)
- Status: In service

General characteristics
- Class & type: Ropucha-class landing ship
- Displacement: 3,450 t (3,396 long tons) standard; 4,080 t (4,016 long tons) full load
- Length: 112.5 m (369 ft 1 in)
- Beam: 15.01 m (49 ft 3 in)
- Draught: 4.26 m (14 ft 0 in)
- Ramps: Over bows and at stern
- Installed power: 3 × 750 kW (1,006 hp) diesel generators
- Propulsion: 2 × 9,600 hp (7,159 kW) Zgoda-Sulzer 16ZVB40/48 diesel engines
- Speed: 18 knots (33 km/h; 21 mph)
- Range: 6,000 nmi (11,000 km; 6,900 mi) at 12 knots (22 km/h; 14 mph); 3,500 nmi (6,500 km; 4,000 mi) at 16 knots (30 km/h; 18 mph)
- Endurance: 30 days
- Capacity: 10 × main battle tanks and 340 troops or 12 × BTR APC and 340 troops or 3 × main battle tanks, 3 × 2S9 Nona-S SPG, 5 × MT-LB APC, 4 trucks and 313 troops or 500 tons of cargo
- Complement: 98
- Armament: 2 × AK-725 twin 57 mm (2.2 in) DP guns; 4 × 8 Strela 2 SAM launchers; 2 × 22 A-215 Grad-M rocket launchers

Georgy Pobedonosets (Russian: Георгий Победоносец) is a Ropucha-class landing ship of the Russian Navy and part of the Northern Fleet.

Named after Saint George, the ship was built in Poland and launched in 1984. She was named BDK-45 (Russian: БДК-45) for Russian: Большой десантный корабль, romanized: Bolshoy desantnyi korabl', lit. 'large landing ship', from her construction until being renamed Georgy Pobedonosets in 2002. She is one of the subtype of the Ropucha-class landing ships, designated Project 775/II by the Russian Navy.

== Construction and commissioning ==
Georgy Pobedonosets was built as BDK-45 by Stocznia Północna, part of Gdańsk Shipyard, in Gdańsk, in what was then the Polish People's Republic. She was laid down on 10 December 1983, and launched on 29 June 1984. She was commissioned into the Soviet Navy on 5 March 1985 as part of its Northern Fleet, homeported in Severomorsk, and with the dissolution of the Soviet Union in late December 1991, she went on to serve in the Russian Navy.

== Service ==
BDK-45 was several times declared the best ship in her formation, and twice the best surface ship in the Northern Fleet. She was renamed Georgy Pobedonosets on 21 March 2002. In September 2007, she took part in joint naval exercises in the Barents Sea with the Royal Norwegian Navy's HNoMS Horten, and in 2009, took part in the Ladoga 2009 and Zapad 2009 exercises. Between 10 July and 29 August 2012, she was deployed on joint exercises with ships from the Baltic, Black Sea and Northern Fleets in the Barents, Norwegian and North Seas, the Atlantic Ocean, and the Mediterranean Sea, serving as the flagship of the exercise's commander, Rear-Admiral Vladimir Kasatonov, commander of the Kola Flotilla. On 18 September 2013, she was one of several ships transporting servicemen and equipment from the Belarusian Armed Forces to Baltiysk for the Zapad 2013 exercises. The following year she was deployed to the Mediterranean, returning to her homeport in July 2014.

Georgy Pobedonosets deployed with a detachment to the New Siberian Islands in September 2014, returning to Severomorsk on 9 October. In 2015, she and her sister ship Kondopoga landed troops near Dudinka as part of exercises. Also that year she underwent repairs and refitting at the 35th Ship Repair Yard, taking part in the Severomorsk Navy Day naval parade on 26 July 2015. Work had been completed by May 2016, when she began a deployment to the Mediterranean. She visited the Russian naval facility at Tartus, Syria, making trips from Novorossiysk in the Black Sea to carry equipment to Tartus as part of the "Syrian Express", supporting the Russian intervention in the Syrian civil war. She was on this mission for nearly a year, returning on 5 April 2017. On 10 August 2017, she was again at sea, sailing with a detachment of the Northern Fleet led by the Udaloy-class destroyer Severomorsk to the eastern Arctic Ocean. The detachment carried out joint exercises simulating the defence of an industrial facility on the Taimyr Peninsula, before Georgy Pobedonosets and her sister ship Aleksandr Otrakovsky deployed independently of the detachment on 5 September. They carried out a landing operation on Novaya Zemlya, returning to base on 13 September.

In mid-January Georgy Pobedonosets and two other Northern Fleet landing ships, the Ropucha-class Olenegorsky Gornyak and the Ivan Gren-class Pyotr Morgunov, set sail for the Mediterranean Sea. En route they joined up with three Ropucha-class vessels sailing from the Baltic Fleet, Korolyov, Minsk, and Kaliningrad. The six ships were shadowed on their voyage by NATO vessels, including as they passed through the English Channel by HMS Dragon and HMS Tyne. After calling at the Tartus naval base for replenishment, the ships entered the Black Sea on 8 and 9 February, nominally for exercises with the Black Sea Fleet. The Barents Observer reported that the ships were heavily loaded and low in the water, and carrying equipment and troops from the Northern Fleet’s elite forces.
