= Ropucha-class landing ship =

Russian Navy class of landing ships

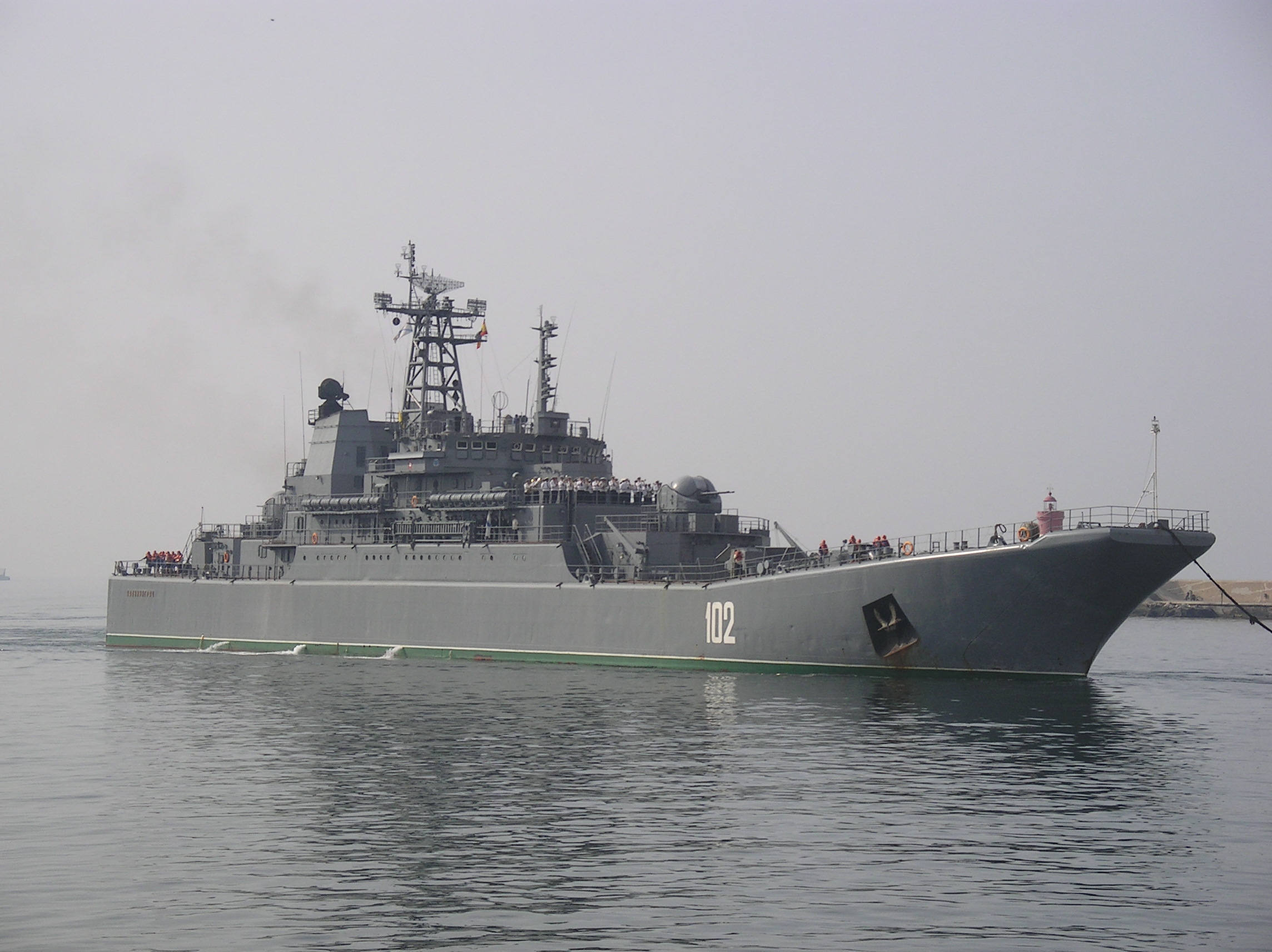
- The Ropucha-class landing ship Kaliningrad during a visit to Cartagena in 2004

Class overview
- Name: Ropucha class
- Builders: Stocznia Północna Shipyard, Gdańsk, Poland
- Operators: Russian Navy; Ukrainian Navy; Yemeni Navy
- Preceded by: Polnocny class
- Succeeded by: Ivan Gren class
- Subclasses: Project 775 (Ropucha I); Project 775M (Ropucha II)
- In commission: 1974
- Completed: 28
- Active: Project 775: 8; Project 775M: 3
- Lost: 3
- Retired: 12

General characteristics
- Type: Landing ship/tank landing ship
- Displacement: 3,450 tonnes standard; 4,080 tonnes full load
- Length: 112.5 m (369 ft 1 in)
- Beam: 15 m (49 ft 3 in)
- Draft: 3.7 m (12 ft 2 in)
- Ramps: Bow and stern
- Installed power: 2 × 9,600 hp (7,200 kW) Zgoda-Sulzer 16ZVB40/48 diesel engines; 3 × 750 kW (1,006 hp) diesel generators
- Propulsion: 2 × propellers
- Speed: 18 knots (33 km/h; 21 mph)
- Range: 6,100 nmi (11,300 km; 7,000 mi) at 15 knots (28 km/h; 17 mph)
- Endurance: 30 days
- Capacity: 10 main battle tanks and 340 troops or; 12 BTR and 340 troops or; 3 main battle tanks, 3 2S9 Nona-S, 5 MT-LB, 4 army trucks and 313 troops or; 500 tons of cargo
- Complement: 87–98
- Armament: 2 × 57 mm AK-725 double guns (Ropucha I); 1 × 76 mm AK-176 (Ropucha II); 2 × 30 122 mm rocket launcher A-215 Grad-M; Strela 2 (SA-N-5) surface-to-air missile system (4 launchers); 2 × 30 mm AK-630 six-barreled gatling guns (Ropucha II)

The Ropucha class (NATO reporting name, Polish for "toad"; phonetically 'Ropooha', IPA: rɔpuxa), Soviet designation Project 775, is a class of landing ship (large landing ship or Bol'shoy Desantnyy Korabl' - Russian: Большой десантный корабль (BDK - Russian: БДК) in Soviet classification) built in Poland for the Soviet Navy. The ships were built in the Stocznia Północna shipyards in Gdańsk, Poland. They were designed for beach landings, and can carry 450 tons of cargo. The ships have both bow and stern doors for loading and unloading vehicles, and the 630 square metres (6,800 sq ft) of vehicle deck stretch the length of the hull. Up to 25 armored personnel carriers can be embarked.

While designed for roll-on/roll-off operations, they can also be loaded using dockside cranes. For this purpose there is a long sliding hatch-cover above the bow section for access to the vehicle deck. There are no facilities for helicopters.

The Soviet Navy commissioned a total of 28 ships of this type from 1975 to 1991. The last three ships were of the improved variant Project 775M, also called Ropucha II. These have improved defensive armament and accommodation for a greater number of troops.

== Operational history ==
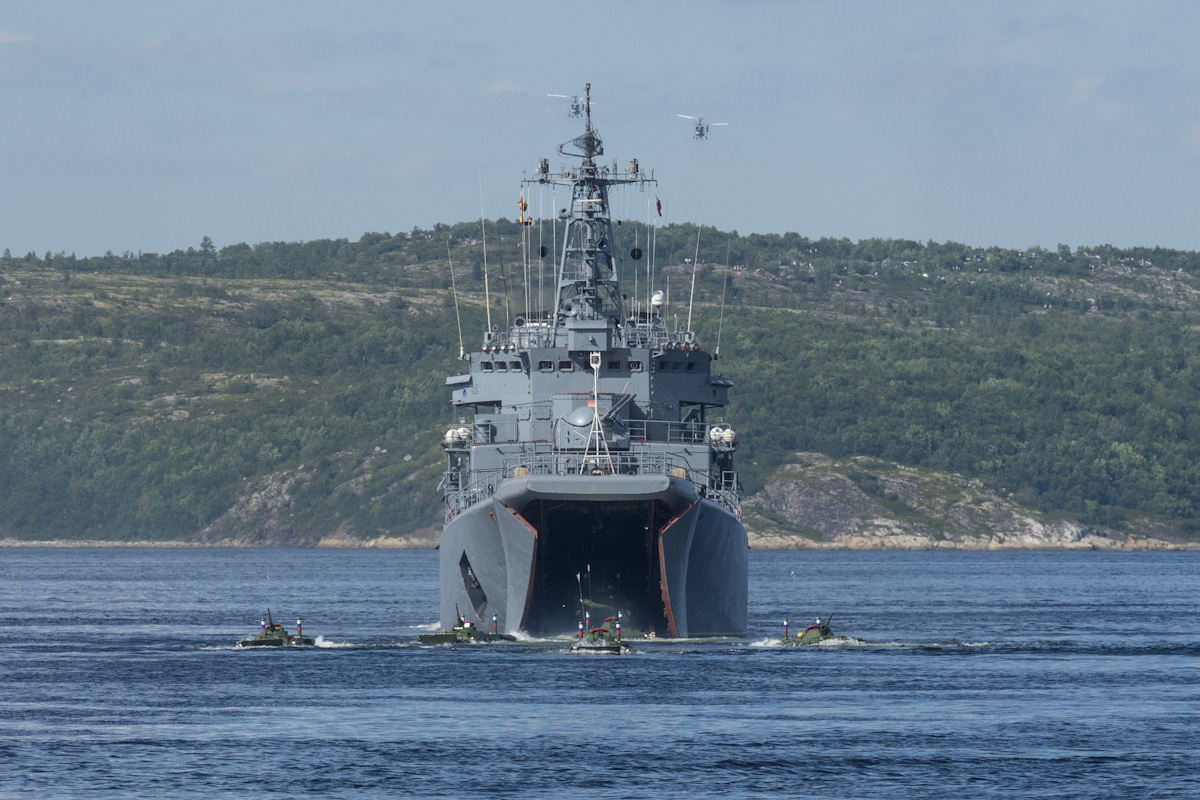
Georgy Pobedonosets on exercises in the Barents Sea

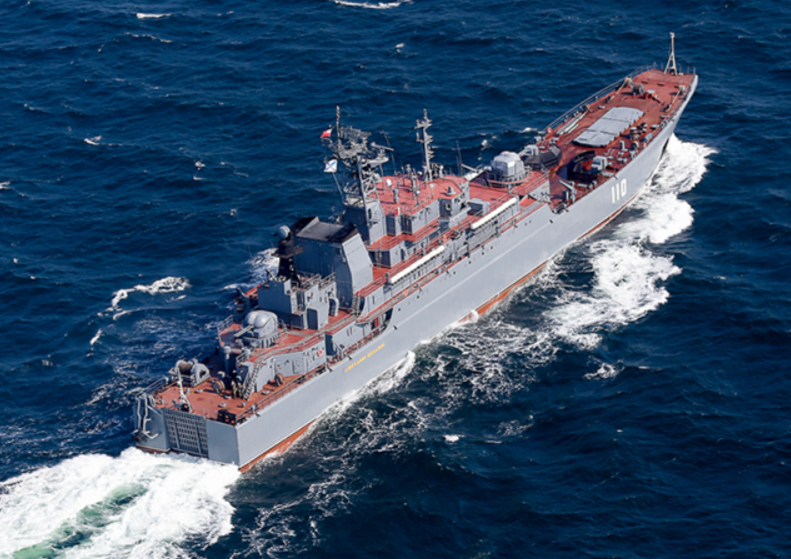
Alexander Shabalin

Most of the ships became part of the Russian Navy after the dissolution of the Soviet Union. They were used for landing troops at the Georgian port of Poti during the Russo-Georgian War and for deliveries of cargo during the Russian military intervention in the Syrian civil war.

One ship of the class was delivered to South Yemen in 1979 and served the Yemeni Navy until 2002, before it was sold as a civilian cargo ship named Sam of Yemen. It was the only one of the class in service outside the former Soviet Union.

On 3 August 2012, international media reported that three vessels of the class, Aleksandr Otrakovsky, Georgy Pobedonosets and Kondopoga, would visit the Russian naval base in Tartus, Syria. The ships were part of the Northern Fleet. Earlier reports, quoting an anonymous source at the Russian general staff, said the ships would spend a few days in Tartus and take on fresh supplies of food and water. British media added that the ships each had up to 120 marines on board. The Russian defence ministry left open the possibility that the ships might dock there at some point for logistical reasons, saying they had every right to do so. The General Staff source had said that after calling at Tartus they would head for the Bosporus and the Russian Black Sea port of Novorossiysk. From 2013 on, ten Ropucha-class ships, gathered from all four Russian fleets, were used to transport military equipment from Novorossiysk to Tartus, during an intervention in the Syrian civil war.

All four ships of the Russia's Black Sea Fleet, namely Tsezar Kunikov, Novocherkassk, Yamal and Azov, were modernized with installation of the Tsentavr-NM2S, Auriga and Cobham SAILOR satellite phones.

=== Russo-Ukrainian War ===
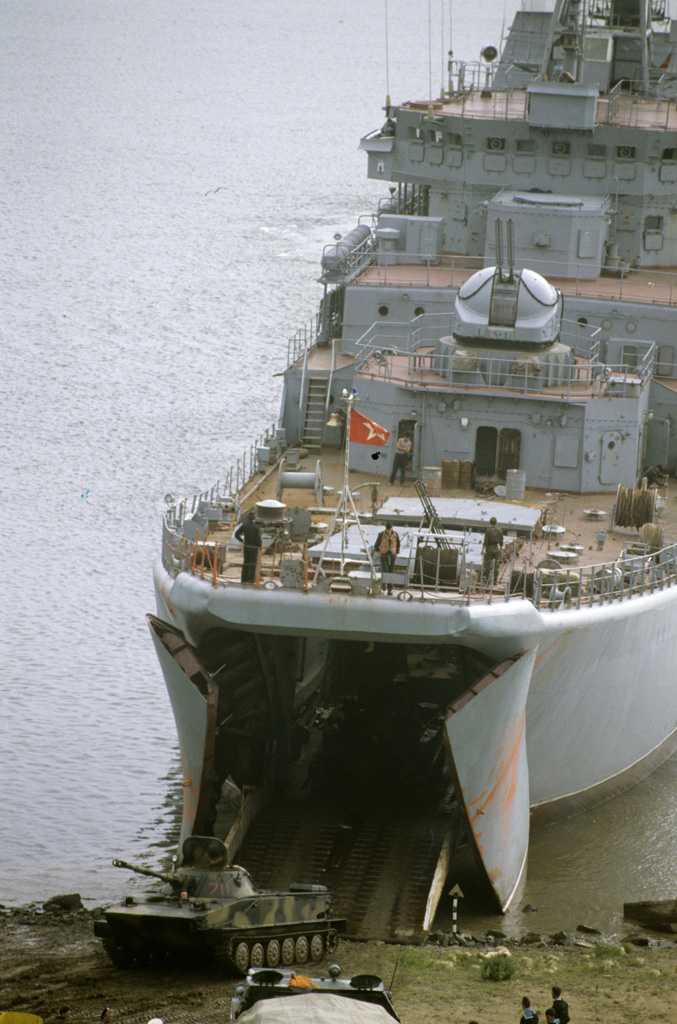
A PT-76 amphibious tank leaving a Project 775 ship at the bow gate

The Ukrainian Navy's only ship of the class, Kostiantyn Olshansky, was seized by Russian troops and pressed into service with the Russian navy after their invasion and subsequent occupation of Crimea in March 2014.

In January 2022, prior to the full-scale Russian invasion of Ukraine, the landing ships Korolyov, Minsk, Kaliningrad, Pyotr Morgunov (Project 11711), Georgy Pobedonosets, and Olenegorsky Gornyak from the Baltic and Northern fleets departed their bases and passed through the Dardanelles Strait for claimed exercises in the Black Sea.

In late March 2022, Novocherkassk and Tsezar Kunikov were damaged in a Ukrainian attack in the port of Berdiansk. Tsezar Kunikov's commander, Captain of the 3rd rank Alexander Chirva, was reportedly killed in the strike. The ships were unable to return to active duty for several months due to lack of spare parts.

In early August 2023, Olenegorsky Gornyak was seriously damaged at the Black Sea Novorossiysk naval base after it was struck by a Ukrainian maritime drone carrying 450 kilograms (990 lb) of TNT. The ship was pictured under tow, listing 40–50 degrees to port as tugboats worked to put it in a safe position.

On 13 September 2023, Russian military reported that the Sevastopol Shipyard had been struck by a Ukrainian missile attack, damaging Minsk and the Kilo-class submarine Rostov-on-Don.

On 26 December 2023, Novocherkassk was struck by Ukrainian cruise missiles and destroyed. Satellite imagery and local photography taken after the strike showed that an exploded wreck was what remained of the ship.

On 14 February 2024, Tsezar Kunikov was reported sunk by several Ukrainian naval drones.

On 24 March 2024, the two remaining Ropucha-class landing ships of the Russian Black Sea Fleet were struck by cruise missiles while they were in port in Sevastopol. The Ukrainian general staff and open-source intelligence sources reported that both Yamal and Azov were hit. The recent satellite images did not reveal any damage, showing that the missile hit the pier next to the ship presumably due to the electronic warfare system.

On 26 March 2024, Ukraine claimed to have struck the Konstantin Olshansky with a Neptune missile without providing any direct confirmation. This vessel was seized from Ukraine in 2014, when Russian forces took control of the Crimean peninsula.

== List of ships ==
| Project | Name | Hull No. | Builders | Commissioned | Fleet | Status | Notes |
|---|---|---|---|---|---|---|---|
| 775 | BDK-47 (ex-SDK-47) | 134 | Gdańsk Shipyard | 1 July 1974 | Baltic Fleet | Decommissioned 17 December 1994 | |
| 775 | BDK-48 (ex-SDK-48) | 094 | Gdańsk Shipyard | 30 June 1975 | Pacific Fleet | Decommissioned 5 July 1994 | |
| 775 | BDK-63 (ex-SDK-63) | 083 | Gdańsk Shipyard | 30 June 1975 | Pacific Fleet | Decommissioned 5 July 1994 | |
| 775 | BDK-90 (ex-SDK-90) | 058 | Gdańsk Shipyard | 30 November 1975 | Pacific Fleet | Decommissioned 5 July 1994 | |
| 775 | Olenegorsky Gornyak (ex-BDK-91) | 012 | Gdańsk Shipyard | 30 June 1976 | Northern Fleet | Not active | Being repaired in drydock as of 2024 after a Ukrainian naval drone impact on 4 August 2023 in the port of Novorossiysk, during the Russian invasion of Ukraine. |
| 775 | BDK-181 (ex-SDK-181) | 083 | Gdańsk Shipyard | 9 October 1976 | Pacific Fleet | Decommissioned 5 July 1994 | |
| 775 | Kondopoga (ex-SDK-182) | 027 | Gdańsk Shipyard | 30 November 1976 | Northern Fleet | Active as of 2024 | |
| 775 | Kotlas (ex-SDK-183) | 035 | Gdańsk Shipyard | 15 March 1977 | Northern Fleet | Decommissioned 22 June 2005 | |
| 775 | BDK-197 (ex-SDK-197) | 093 | Gdańsk Shipyard | 21 September 1977 | Pacific Fleet | Decommissioned 5 July 1994 | |
| 775 | BDK-200 (ex-SDK-200) | 011 | Gdańsk Shipyard | 17 December 1977 | Northern Fleet | Decommissioned 30 June 1993 | |
| 775 | Aleksandr Otrakovsky (ex-SDK-55) | 031 | Gdańsk Shipyard | 30 July 1978 | Northern Fleet | Active | |
| 775 | BDK-119 (ex-SDK-119) | | Gdańsk Shipyard | 27 February 1979 | Pacific Fleet | Transferred to South Yemen in 1979, decommissioned in 2002 and converted to cargo ship Sam of Yemen, sunk in 2018. | |
| 775/II | BDK-14 | 070 | Gdańsk Shipyard | 31 August 1981 | Pacific Fleet | Decommissioned 3 May 2001 | |
| 775/II | Oslyabya (ex-BDK-101) | 066 | Gdańsk Shipyard | 19 December 1981 | Pacific Fleet | Active as of 2025 | |
| 775/II | BDK-105 | 125 | Gdańsk Shipyard | 2 March 1982 | Baltic Fleet | Decommissioned 10 May 2002 | |
| 775/II | Admiral Nevelskoy (ex-BDK-98) | 055 | Gdańsk Shipyard | 28 September 1982 | Pacific Fleet | Active as of 2025 | |
| 775/II | BDK-32 | 039 | Gdańsk Shipyard | 1982 | Northern Fleet | Decommissioned 10 May 2002 | |
| 775/II | Minsk (ex-BDK-43) | 127 | Gdańsk Shipyard | 30 May 1983 | Baltic Fleet | Not active | Heavily damaged in Ukrainian attack on Sevastopol on 13 September 2023. Russian government announced that the ship will be restored. |
| 775/II | Kaliningrad (ex-BDK-58) | 102 | Gdańsk Shipyard | 9 December 1984 | Baltic Fleet | Deployed to the Black Sea and participating in the Russo-Ukraine War as of 2022 | |
| 775/II | Georgy Pobedonosets (ex-BDK-45) | 016 | Gdańsk Shipyard | 5 March 1985 | Northern Fleet | Deployed to the Black Sea and participating in the Russo-Ukraine War as of 2022 | |
| 775/II | Konstantin Olshansky (ex-BDK-56) | 154 | Gdańsk Shipyard | 1985 | Black Sea Fleet | Not active | Transferred to Ukraine in 1996, captured March 2014 during the Russian invasion of Crimea. Reported hit by Ukrainian Neptune Missile on 26th of March, 2024. |
| 775/II | Aleksandr Shabalin (ex-BDK-60) | 110 | Gdańsk Shipyard | 31 December 1985 | Baltic Fleet | Active | Refitted in 2020-2024; active as of 2026 |
| 775/II | Tsezar Kunikov (ex-BDK-64) | 158 | Gdańsk Shipyard | 30 September 1986 | Black Sea Fleet | Reported sunk by Ukrainian sources | Damaged on 24 March 2022 in a Ukrainian attack in the port of Berdiansk during the Russian invasion of Ukraine. Sunk by a Ukrainian naval drone attack on 14 February 2024. |
| 775/II | Novocherkassk (ex-BDK-46) | 142 | Gdańsk Shipyard | 30 November 1987 | Black Sea Fleet | Destroyed | Damaged on 24 March 2022 in a Ukrainian attack in the port of Berdiansk during the Russian invasion of Ukraine. Destroyed in a Ukrainian air strike on Feodosia on 26 December 2023. |
| 775/II | Yamal (ex-BDK-67) | 156 | Gdańsk Shipyard | 30 April 1988 | Black Sea Fleet | Active | May have been damaged in drone attack in April 2026 |
| 775M | Azov (ex-BDK-54) | 151 | Gdańsk Shipyard | 12 October 1990 | Black Sea Fleet | Active | Damaged in drone attack by Alpha Group (Ukraine) on 18 April 2026 |
| 775M | Peresvet (ex-BDK-11) | 077 | Gdańsk Shipyard | 10 April 1991 | Pacific Fleet | Active as of 2024 | |
| 775M | Korolyov (ex-BDK-61) | 130 | Gdańsk Shipyard | 10 July 1991 | Baltic Fleet | Deployed to the Black Sea and participating in the Russo-Ukraine War as of 2022 | |

== See also ==
- List of ships of the Soviet Navy
- List of ships of Russia by project number

Equivalent landing ships of the same era

- Newport class
- Miura class
- Teluk Semangka class
- Hengam class

== Sources ==
- Polmar, Norman (1991). The Naval Institute Guide to the Soviet Navy (5th ed.). Annapolis, MD: United States Naval Institute. pp. 217–218. ISBN 9780870212413 – via Google Books.
