= Russian landing ship Korolyov =

Russian Navy landing ship

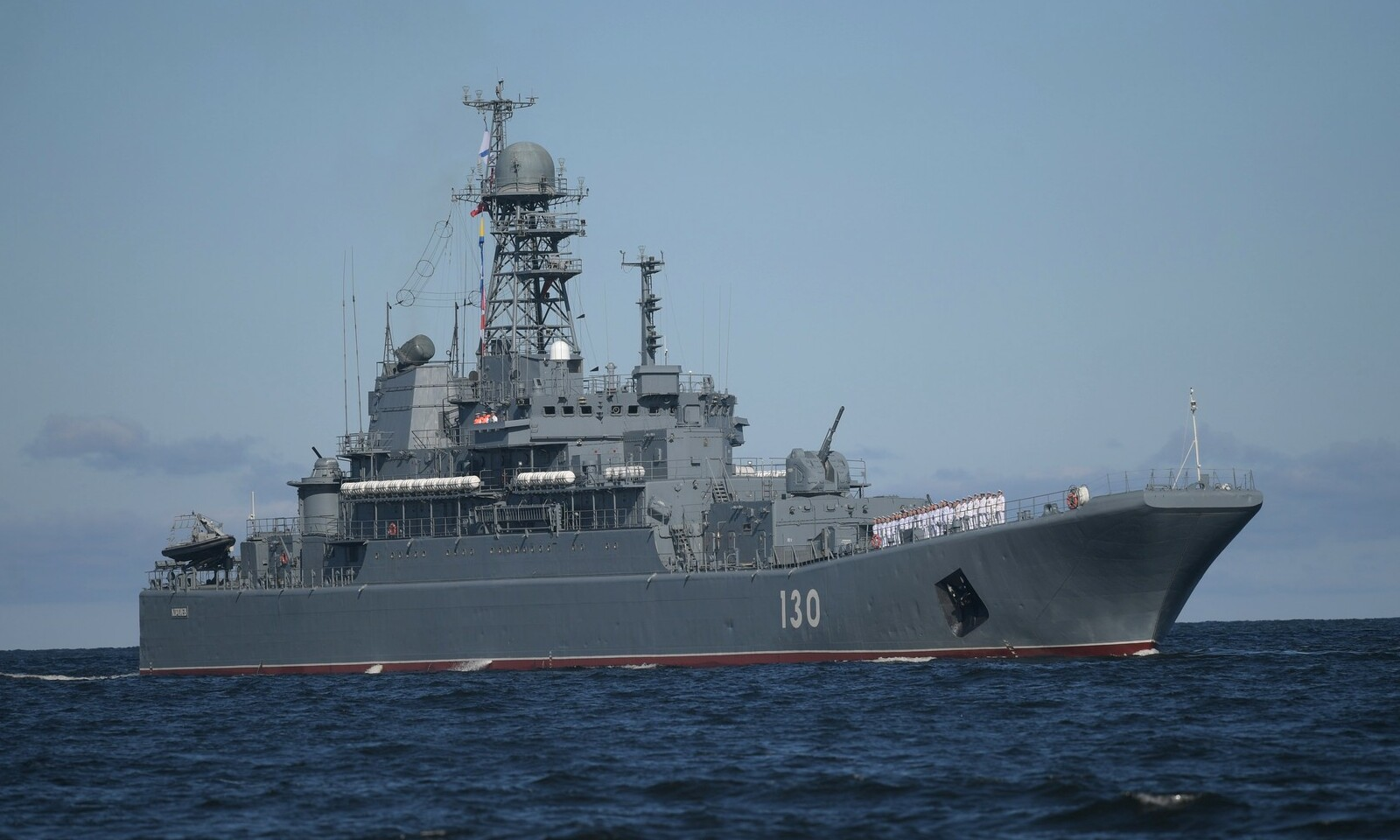

History

Russia
- Name: BDK-61 (1990-1999); Korolyov (1999-present)
- Namesake: Korolyov, Moscow Oblast
- Builder: Stocznia Północna, Gdańsk, Poland
- Laid down: 12 February 1990
- Launched: 16 November 1990
- Commissioned: 5 January 1992
- Home port: Baltiysk
- Identification: Hull number: 130

General characteristics
- Class & type: Ropucha-class landing ship
- Displacement: 3,450 t (3,396 long tons) standard; 4,080 t (4,016 long tons) full load
- Length: 112.5 m (369 ft 1 in)
- Beam: 15.01 m (49 ft 3 in)
- Draught: 4.26 m (14 ft 0 in)
- Ramps: Over bows and at stern
- Installed power: 3 × 750 kW (1,006 hp) diesel generators
- Propulsion: 2 × 9,600 hp (7,159 kW) Zgoda-Sulzer 16ZVB40/48 diesel engines
- Speed: 18 knots (33 km/h; 21 mph)
- Range: 6,000 nmi (11,000 km; 6,900 mi) at 12 knots (22 km/h; 14 mph); 3,500 nmi (6,500 km; 4,000 mi) at 16 knots (30 km/h; 18 mph)
- Endurance: 30 days
- Capacity: 10 × main battle tanks and 340 troops or 12 × BTR APC and 340 troops or 3 × main battle tanks, 3 × 2S9 Nona-S SPG, 5 × MT-LB APC, 4 trucks and 313 troops or 500 tons of cargo
- Complement: 98
- Armament: 2 × AK-725 twin 57 mm (2.2 in) DP guns; 4 × 8 Strela 2 SAM launchers; 2 × 22 A-215 Grad-M rocket launchers

Korolyov (Russian: Королёв) is a Ropucha-class landing ship of the Russian Navy and part of the Baltic Fleet.

Named after the city of Korolyov, Moscow Oblast, the ship was built in Poland and launched in 1990. She was named BDK-61 (Russian: БДК-61) for Russian: Большой десантный корабль, romanized: Bolshoy desantnyi korabl', lit. 'large landing ship', from her construction until being renamed Korolyov in 1999. She is one of three ships of the subtype of the Ropucha-class landing ships, designated Project 775M or 775/III by the Russian Navy.

== Construction and commissioning ==
Korolyov was built as BDK-61 by Stocznia Północna, part of Gdańsk Shipyard, in Gdańsk, in what was then the Polish People's Republic. She was laid down on 12 February 1990, and launched on 16 November 1990. At this point she was intended for the Soviet Navy, but with the dissolution of the Soviet Union in late December 1991, she was commissioned on 5 January 1992, going on to serve in the Russian Navy as part of its Baltic Fleet, homeported in Baltiysk.

== Career ==
On commissioning, BDK-61 was almost immediately assigned to the task of assisting in the withdrawal of Russian military forces from Poland and the newly independent Baltic countries. She carried out these tasks from 23 March 1992 to 19 September 1994. She was present at the Saint Petersburg naval parades for Russia's Navy Day in 1994 and 1995, and in 1995, represented Russia at the international naval parade in the Netherlands, celebrating the 50th anniversary of the end of the Second World War. She and her 71st Landing Ship Brigade was awarded the Naval Commander-in-Chief's prize for landing training in 1995, 1996, 1997, 1998, and 1999, and the award of best ship in her brigade for combat training and military discipline every year between 1992 and 1999. On 28 December 1999, she was renamed Korolyov after the city of Korolyov, Moscow Oblast, itself named for the rocket pioneer Sergei Korolev.

In July 2004, inspections at the Baltiysk customs post uncovered 10 tons of contraband sugar in 200 sacks aboard the ship. In 2014, she was present at the Navy Day in Baltiysk, and in March 2015, carried out gunnery exercises with the minesweeper BT-212, before taking part in the Saint Petersburg naval parade in May. She then deployed to the Mediterranean in May that year, replacing her sister ship Aleksandr Shabalin for service with the navy's taskforce there. She returned to the Baltic in January 2016. In January 2017 she conveyed troops and equipment to Sevastopol from Syria as part of a drawdown of Russian forces deployed there. She took part in air defence and gunnery exercises with other Baltic Fleet ships in July, and again on 6 September 2017, and in 2018 was again part of the Saint Petersburg Navy Day parade.

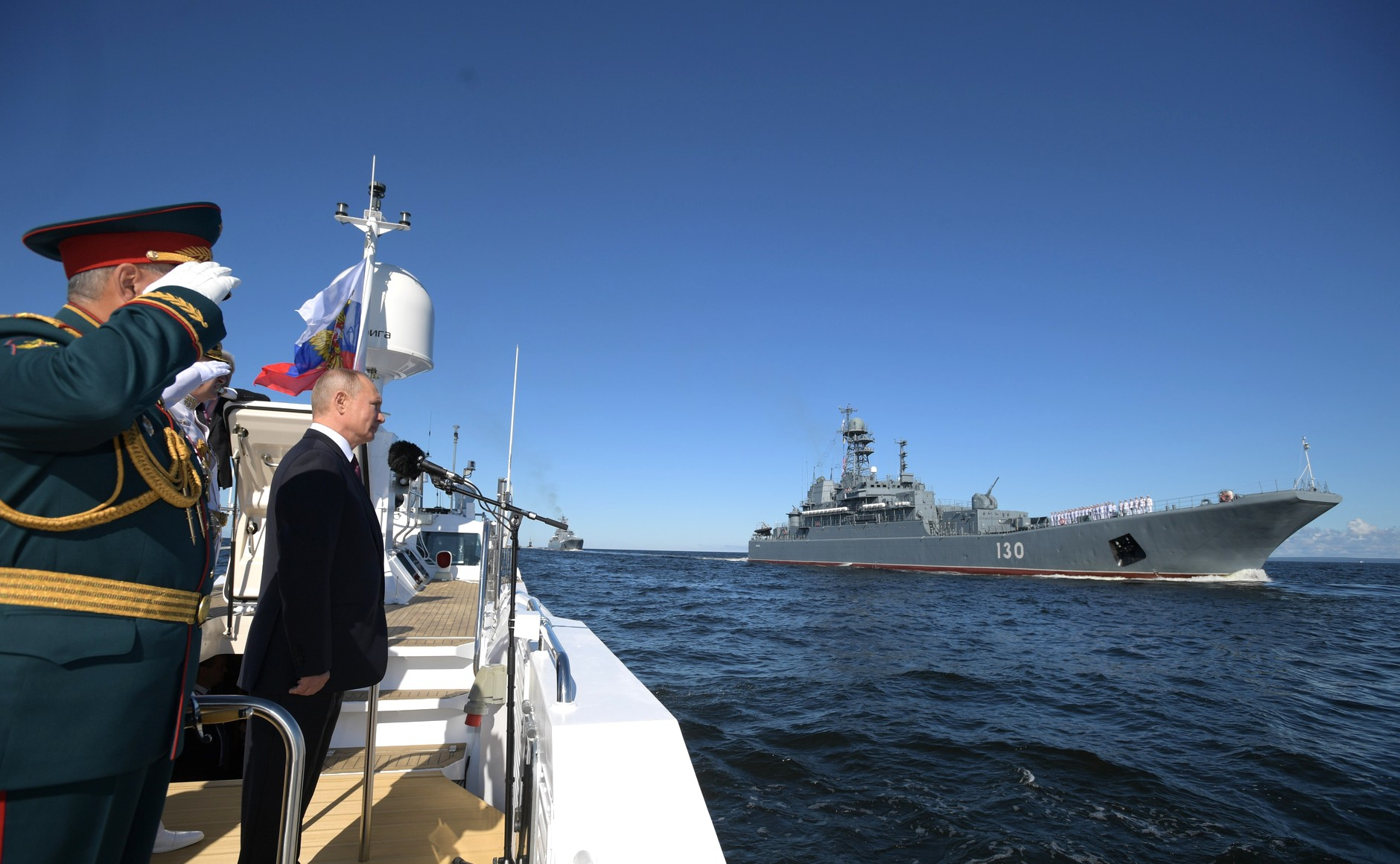
Vladimir Putin and Defence Minister Sergei Shoigu watch Korolyov underway at the Saint Petersburg naval parade on 26 July 2020

In September 2018, Korolyov and her sister ships Minsk and Aleksandr Shabalin, in company with several Dyugon-class landing craft, carried out landing exercises at the Khmelevka training ground in Kaliningrad Oblast. She was involved in similar exercises in April 2019, and ones in partnership with minesweeping forces in September that year. In February 2020, Korolyov deployed into the Atlantic to conduct exercises with the corvette Stoikiy. She carried out further exercises on her return to the Baltic in March, and in July was part of the naval parade in Saint Petersburg. In March 2021, Korolyov and her sister ships Minsk and Kaliningrad, and the corvette Boikiy entered the Atlantic. Kaliningrad and Korolyov entered the Mediterranean Sea on 25 March, while Boikiy and Minsk returned to the Baltic Sea on 27 March.

In mid-January 2022 Korolyov and two other Baltic Fleet landing ships, Minsk, and Kaliningrad, set sail for the Mediterranean. Enroute they combined with three landing ships sailing from the Northern Fleet, the Pyotr Morgunov, Olenegorsky Gornyak and Georgy Pobedonosets. The six ships were shadowed on their voyage by NATO vessels, including as they passed through the English Channel by HMS Dragon and HMS Tyne. After calling at the Tartus naval base for replenishment, the ships entered the Black Sea, nominally for exercises with the Black Sea Fleet. The Barents Observer reported that the ships were heavily loaded and low in the water, and carrying equipment and troops. Korolyov has since been deployed in the Black Sea during the Russian invasion of Ukraine.
