= Russian corvette Boikiy =

Steregushchiy-class Russian warship

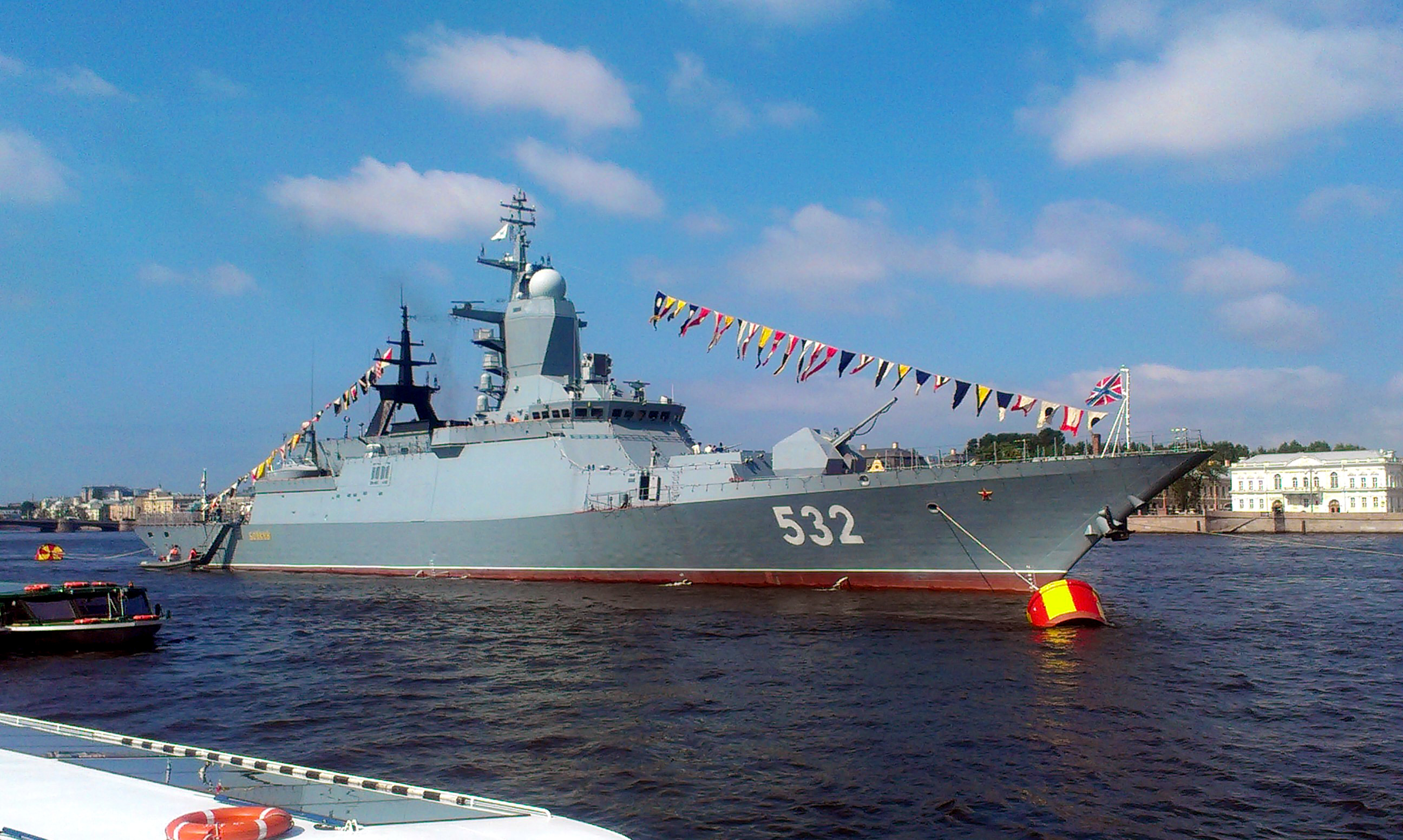
- Russian corvette Boikiy

History

Russia
- Name: Boikiy
- Builder: Severnaya Verf
- Laid down: 27 July 2005
- Launched: 15 April 2011
- Commissioned: 14 May 2013
- Status: Heavily damaged while in drydock

General characteristics
- Class & type: Steregushchiy-class corvette
- Displacement: 2,100 t (2,100 long tons) full load
- Length: 104.5 m (342 ft 10 in)
- Beam: 11.1 m (36 ft 5 in)
- Draught: 3.7 m (12 ft 2 in)
- Propulsion: 2 shaft CODAD, 4 16D49 diesels 24,000 hp (18,000 kW), power supply AC 380/220 V, 50 Hz, 4 × 630 kW diesel genset
- Speed: 26 knots (48 km/h; 30 mph)
- Range: 4,000 nmi (7,400 km) at 14 knots (26 km/h; 16 mph)
- Endurance: 15 days
- Complement: 100
- Sensors & processing systems: Air search radar: Furke-E 3D, E/F band Monument targeting radar
- Electronic warfare & decoys: TK-25E-5 ECM, 4 × PK-10 decoy launchers
- Armament: 1 × Arsenal A-190 100 mm gun; 2 × MTPU pedestal 14.5 mm machine gun; 12-cell Redut VLS; 9M96E/M SAM; 9M100 SAM quad-packed configuration; 8 × 3M24 Uran missiles; 2 × AK-630М CIWS; 2 × quad 330 mm torpedo tubes (for Paket-NK anti-sub/anti-torpedo torpedoes)
- Aircraft carried: Helipad for Ka-27 helicopter

Boikiy (Russian: Бойкий, lit. 'Brisk') is a Steregushchiy-class corvette of the Russian Navy, the third ship of that class. The ship was launched on 15 April 2011 and was commissioned on 14 May 2013. In June 2026, Boikiy was struck by drones while docked at the Kronstadt naval base in Saint Petersburg, Russia.

== History ==
Construction commenced in July 2005 and it was launched on 15 April 2011. She was presented to the Baltic Fleet for final inspection by the Navy on 16 March 2012, ahead of her commissioning later in the year. On 16 November 2012, it was reported that the corvette had passed the shipyard's sea trials; about 70 certificates were signed then. JSC Arsenal intended to produce a 100-mm gun mount A190-01 for the corvette. In late 2012, the ship moved to Baltiysk, which initiated state acceptance trials, as the second phase of sea trials.

On 14 May 2013, the corvette was handed over to the Russian Navy.

In April 2017, Boikiy and sister Soobrazitelny were escorted through the English Channel by HMS Sutherland.

On 20 March 2021, Boikiy, accompanied by tank landing ships (LSTs) Korolyov, Minsk and Kaliningrad transited the English Channel unannounced. A significance of the deployment was the lack of the public announcement of the exit to sea by the Baltic Fleet, and the strong amphibious component of the ship detachment. The deployment could have simulated keeping the sea lines of communication between the Baltic and Black Sea Fleets open in a wartime scenario. Since the mission took place soon after the exercise of USS Dwight D. Eisenhower and Tonnerre with the Greek Navy, the deployment could have been meant to relieve the besieged Black Sea Fleet in drills. The four-ship detachment then separated: Kaliningrad and Korolyov entered the Mediterranean Sea on 25 March, while Boikiy and Minsk returned to the Baltic Sea on 27 March.

On 22 March, the three LSTs of the Baltic Fleet were joined by two LSTs of the Northern Fleet: Aleksandr Otrakovsky and Kondopoga, escorted by the tug SB-406 Vikhr.

In early March 2025, Boikiy was part of a task group tracked by HMS Somerset for three days as she made her way through the English Channel and North Sea, escorting the Russian merchant vessel Baltic Leader on her return from the seaport and Russian naval base of Tartus, Syria, to Russia. On 21 June 2025, the ship was identified passing through the English Channel while escorting two Russian shadow fleet tankers, Selva and Sierra. Boikiy disguised itself by broadcasting a spoofed shared Maritime Mobile Service Identity (MMSI), making it appear in tracking systems as different maritime objects. The ship was reported active as of early 2026.

=== June 2026 strike ===
On 3 June 2026, Boikiy was struck by at least two drones while in dry dock at the Kronstadt naval base in Saint Petersburg, Russia. Satellite imagery and video from the dock showed the ship engulfed in fire with severe damage to the ship's superstructure.

The damage was described as "catastrophic", with the ship's integrated mainmast completely collapsed and the bridge likely severely damaged. The UK-based publication Navy Lookout assessed that Boikiy "will require an extensive programme of repair and system replacement" before it is returned to service, and that "there is a realistic prospect that the damage could be assessed as beyond economic repair" given constraints in Russia's industrial base.
