= Polukhin-class minesweeper =

Soviet minesweepers

- A member of the class on 17 May 1954, after being towed to Maltepe, Turkey.

Class overview
- Name: Polukhin-class minesweeper
- Builders: Leningrad; Sevastopol
- Operators: Soviet Navy; U.S. Navy
- Subclasses: Project 59; Project 73K
- Built: 1938–Post-World War II
- Planned: 20
- Completed: 15
- Cancelled: 5

General characteristics (Project 59)
- Type: Minesweeper
- Displacement: 690 tons; 880 tons fully loaded
- Length: 79.50m overall
- Beam: 8.10m
- Depth: 2.50m
- Speed: 22.5kn
- Complement: 125 persons

General characteristics (Project 73K)
- Type: Minesweeper
- Displacement: 703 tons; 864 tons fully loaded
- Length: 78.60m overall
- Beam: 8.10m
- Depth: 2.48m
- Speed: 17kn
- Complement: 118 persons

The Polukhin-class minesweeper was a class of ships built for the Soviet Navy. They existed in two versions: Project 59 and Project 73K.

== History ==
Work on the Vladimir Polukhin-class began in 1938 and 1939 when numbers 370 and 363 were laid down in Leningrad.The first two ships were Vladimir Polukhin (T-250), for whom the class was named, and Vasiliy Gromov (T-254); they were completed in 1942 and 1943. They were supposed to be finished before World War II but there were delays in delivering turbines and boilers. The modified version, Project 73k, consisted of 20 ships laid down in 1941 at the number 201 yard at the Sevastopol Yard. None were finished during World War II, and only 15 ended up being completed afterwards. They were initially laid down with turbines but completed with diesels.

The class was designed to assume reconnaissance mine-sweeping in long range and far away areas. They also were supposed to assume mine warfare support for large squadrons. Some were active in the Baltic and Black Seas. Some were operated by the US Navy in lend-lease. All the ships were reclassified in 1956 as miscellaneous auxiliary vessels.

== Specifications ==
=== Project 59 ===
The Project 59 ships were 79.50 meters long overall, 8.10 meters wide, and 2.50 meters draft. They displaced 690 tons normally and 880 when fully loaded. They had two-shaft DK1 geared steam turbines, 2 boilers, and could make 8000 horsepower. Top speed was 22.5 knots. They carried two 100mm/54 B-24BMs, one 45mm/43 21K, three 37mm/63 70Ks, two 20mm/70 Oerlikon Mk IV, four 12.7mm/79, 2 DCR (depth charge racks) with another 20 in store, and 20 mines. Their crew was 125 persons.

=== Project 73k ===
The Project 73k ships 78.60 meters long, 8.10 meters wide, and 2.48 meters draft. They displaced 703 tons normally and 863 when fully loaded. They had two-shaft GM diesel engines and could make 3200 horsepower. Top speed was 17 knots. They carried two 85mm/52 90Ks, four 37mm/73 70Ks, four 12.7mm/79 HMGs, 2 DCTs, and 20 mines. Their crew was 118 persons.

== Ships ==
Project	Name	Designation	Launched
59	Vladimir Polukhin	T-250	30 March 1940
59	Vasiliy Goromov	T-254	31 March 1940
73k	Pavel Khokhryakov	T-251	31 March 1940
73k	Aleksandr Petrov	T-252	November 1940
73k	Karl Zedin	T-253	November 1940
73k	Andrian Zasimov	T-255	15 September 1940
73k	Vladimir Trefolev	T-256	3 December 1940
73k	Timofey Ulyantsev	T-257	29 May 1940
73k	Mikhail Martynov	T-258	30 May 1941
73k	Fiodor Mitrofanov	T-259	30 May 1941
73k	Luka Pankov	T-260	Spring 1941
73k	Pavlin Vinogradov	T-261	July 1941
73k	Stepan Griadushko	T-262	Prior to Siege of Leningrad
73k	Semion Pelikhov	T-263	Prior to Siege of Leningrad
73k	Pavel Golovin	T-450	8 February 1940
73k	Ivan Borisov	T-451	31 December 1939
73k	Sergey Shuvalov	T-452	1941
73k	Sergey Shuvalov	T-453	16 January 1941
73k	Ivan Sladkov	T-454	20 March 1941
73k	Nikolay Markin	T-455	N/A, lost at slipway
