= Russian ship Pamiat Merkuria =

Two cruisers of the Imperial Russian Navy have been called Pamiat Merkuria:

- Russian cruiser Pamiat Merkuria (1878), a French-built ship originally commissioned as Yaroslavl and hulked in 1907.
- Russian cruiser Pamiat Merkuria (1907), a Bogatyr-class protected cruiser that was later taken into Soviet service as Komintern.
