= Russian landing ship Kondopoga =

Russian Navy landing ship

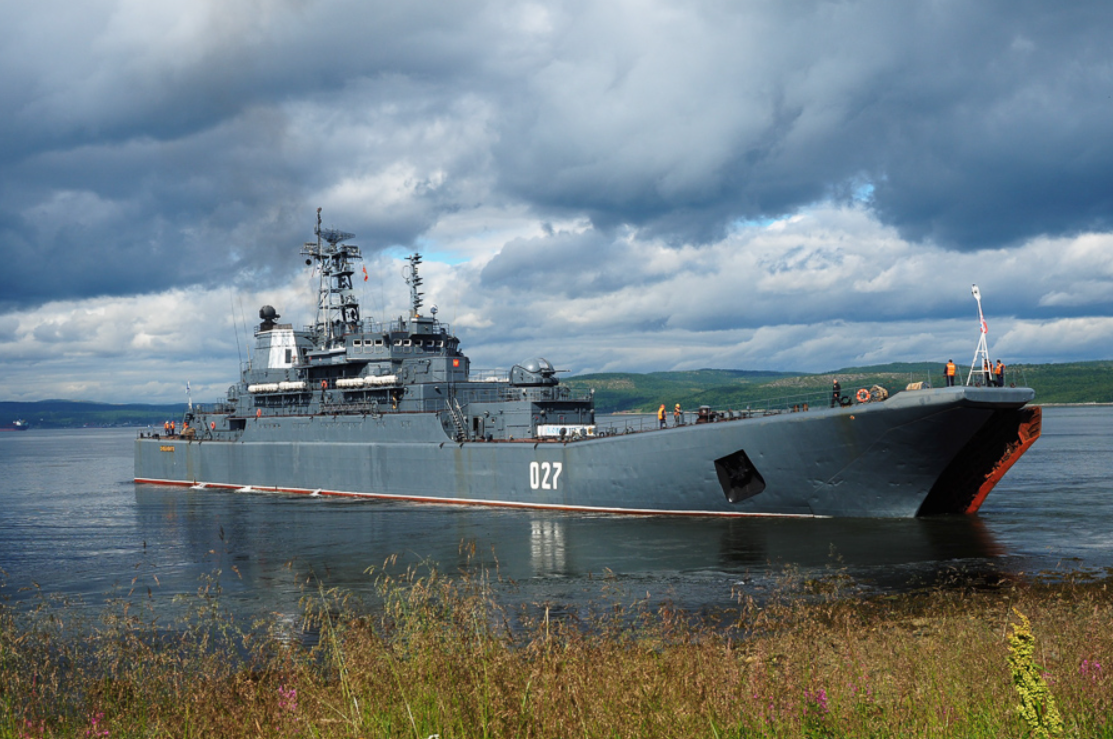

History

Russia
- Name: SDK-182 (1976-1977); BDK-182 (1977-1999); Kondopoga (1999-present)
- Namesake: Kondopoga
- Builder: Stocznia Północna, Gdańsk, Poland
- Laid down: 4 April 1976
- Launched: 17 July 1976
- Commissioned: 30 November 1976
- Home port: Severomorsk
- Identification: Hull number: 481 (1977-1979); 019 (1979-1981); 040 (1981-1987); 014 (1987-1990); 040 (1990-1996); 027 (1996-present)
- Status: In service

General characteristics
- Class & type: Ropucha-class landing ship
- Displacement: 3,450 t (3,396 long tons) standard; 4,080 t (4,016 long tons) full load
- Length: 112.5 m (369 ft 1 in)
- Beam: 15.01 m (49 ft 3 in)
- Draught: 4.26 m (14 ft 0 in)
- Ramps: Over bows and at stern
- Installed power: 3 × 750 kW (1,006 hp) diesel generators
- Propulsion: 2 × 9,600 hp (7,159 kW) Zgoda-Sulzer 16ZVB40/48 diesel engines
- Speed: 18 knots (33 km/h; 21 mph)
- Range: 6,000 nmi (11,000 km; 6,900 mi) at 12 knots (22 km/h; 14 mph); 3,500 nmi (6,500 km; 4,000 mi) at 16 knots (30 km/h; 18 mph)
- Endurance: 30 days
- Capacity: 10 × main battle tanks and 340 troops or 12 × BTR APC and 340 troops or 3 × main battle tanks, 3 × 2S9 Nona-S SPG, 5 × MT-LB APC, 4 trucks and 313 troops or 500 tons of cargo
- Complement: 98
- Armament: 2 × AK-725 twin 57 mm (2.2 in) DP guns; 4 × 8 Strela 2 SAM launchers; 2 × 22 A-215 Grad-M rocket launchers

Kondopoga (Russian: Кондопога) is a Ropucha-class landing ship of the Russian Navy and part of the Northern Fleet.

Named after the town of Kondopoga, the ship was built in Poland and launched in 1976. She was named SDK-182 (Russian: СДК-182) for Russian: Средний десантный корабль, romanized: Sredny desantnyi korabl', lit. 'medium landing ship', during construction, before being named BDK-182 (Russian: БДК-182) for Russian: Большой десантный корабль, romanized: Bolshoy desantnyi korabl', lit. 'large landing ship', and then renamed Kondopoga in 1999. She is one of the first subtype of the Ropucha-class landing ships, designated Project 775 by the Russian Navy.

== Construction and commissioning ==
Kondopoga was ordered, and then laid down on 4 April 1976 as SDK-182, before the entire class was recategorised as large landing ships later in 1977, and SDK-182 became BDK-182. She was built by Stocznia Północna, part of Gdańsk Shipyard, in Gdańsk, in what was then the Polish People's Republic, and launched on 17 July 1976. Commissioned into the Soviet Navy on 30 November 1976 as part of its Northern Fleet, she was homeported in Severomorsk. With the dissolution of the Soviet Union in late December 1991, she went on to serve in the Russian Navy.

== History ==
Spending much of her earlier career named BDK-182, she was renamed Kondopoga on 9 February 1999, when the town took over the ship's patronage. In May 2008, she was deployed on a training exercise with students from the Military Academy of the General Staff, landing a marine assault force. She began a refit in autumn 2011, and was back in service by summer the following year, when from 10 July to 29 August 2012, she sailed on joint exercises with ships from the Baltic, Black Sea and Northern Fleets in the Barents, Norwegian and North Seas, the Atlantic Ocean, and the Mediterranean Sea, directed by Rear-Admiral Vladimir Kasatonov, commander of the Kola Flotilla. In September 2013, she and other units of the Northern Fleet made a training voyage to the New Siberian Islands.

Kondopoga again deployed with a detachment to the New Siberian Islands in September 2014, returning to Severomorsk on 9 October. In 2015, she and her sister ship Georgy Pobedonosets landed troops near Dudinka as part of exercises. On 26 July 2015, she took part in the Navy Day naval parade in Severomorsk. She carried out further fleet exercises in the Arctic in July and October 2016. In July and August 2017, she was part of a detachment of the Northern Fleet on exercises in the eastern Arctic Ocean. She was again on exercises in November 2019, carried out with the Udaloy-class destroyer Vice-Admiral Kulakov.

Kondopoga on exercises on 24 September 2020, deploying troops of the 61st Separate Guards Naval Infantry Brigade

On 14 April 2020, Kondopoga left port for exercises in the Barents Sea. In early 2021, she sailed to the Mediterranean, transiting the Bosporus on 17 April 2021, and entering the Black Sea. In June 2024, Kondopoga and the Ivan Gren-class landing ship Ivan Gren carried out exercises in the Barents Sea. The ship was reported active in 2026, deploying with a Northern Fleet task force into Arctic waters.
