= Sevastopol Shipyard =

Shipyard in Sevastopol, Crimea

Coordinates: 44°36′45″N 33°32′06″E

Sevastopol Shipyards
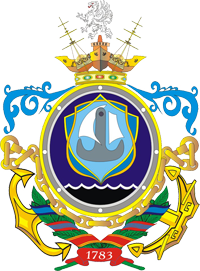
- Native name: Севастопольский морской завод
- Industry: Shipbuilding
- Founded: 1783
- Founder: Imperial Russian Navy
- Headquarters: Sevastopol, Russia / Ukraine
- Services: Shipbuilding, Ship repair, else
- Revenue: 400 mln R (5.81 mln €)
- Operating income: nd (300 to 900 mln R)
- Net income: nd (300 to 500 mln R)
- Total assets: from 300 400 to 600 800 mln Rub minimum (nd)
- Owner: AO TsS Zvezdochka (United Shipbuilding Corporation)
- Number of employees: over 600
- Parent: AO TsS Zvezdochka (United Shipbuilding Corporation)
- Website: starsmz.ru

Sevastopol Shipyard (Russian: Севастопольский морской завод, Ukrainian: Севастопольський морський завод / Севморверф, romanized: Sevmorverf, lit. 'Sevastopol Sea Wharf') is a shipyard located in Sevastopol, Crimea, founded as a dockyard for the Imperial Russian Navy in 1783.

The shipyard has mostly been used to repair and maintain warships throughout its history, although it has occasionally built ships.

== History ==
The Sevastopol Shipyard was founded in 1783 on the south side of Sevastopol Bay as Akhtiar Admiralty to maintain the ships of the Black Sea Fleet. It occasionally built frigates and smaller sailing ships between 1813 and 1851.

It was renamed the Lazarev Admiralty after Admiral Mikhail Lazarev who was assigned as the general commander of the Black Sea Ports and fleet in 1834. He was a major contributor to the development of the Black Sea Fleet and to the building and development of Sevastopol. The dockyard was transferred to the Russian Steam Navigation and Trading Company in 1858 after the damage caused by the Crimean War of 1854–1855.

It was nationalized on 16 August 1897.

The Soviets separated it from the naval base in 1919 and named it the Sevastopol Shipyard, Engineering and Electromechanical Works (Russian: Sevastopol'skii sudostroitel'nyi, mashinostroitel'nyi i elektromekhanicheskii zavod). The dockyard was renamed the Sevastopol Naval Shipyard (Sevastopol'skii morskoi zavod) on either 13 January 1921 or January 1930. It was again renamed Shipyard No. 201 (in the name of Sergo Ordzhonikidze) on 30 December 1936 and became Shipyard in the name of Sergo Ordzhonikidze No. 201 (Zavod imeni Sergo Ordzhonikidze No. 201) on 15 May 1940.

=== After the annexation of Crimea ===
On February 28, 2015, the plant was nationalized in favor of the city by a resolution of the Russian appointed government of Sevastopol.

On April 3, 2015, the Sevastopol Shipyard was renamed "Sevastopol Shipyard named after Sergo Ordzhonikidze" (Russian: ГУП «Севастопольский морской завод имени Серго Орджоникидзе»).

On April 4, 2015, the Vice Prime Minister Dmitry Rogozin visited the plant.

As of April 21, 2015, the plant began to repair ships and serve the ships of the Black Sea Fleet.

As of March 2017, the shipyard is under the ownership of Zvezdochka Shipyard, a subsidiary of United Shipbuilding Corporation.

Under Ukrainian law, the shipyard is a part of the Sevastopol Marine Plant (Ukrainian: Севморзавод; Sevmorzavod) joint-stock company (JSC). On January 31, 2018, the government of Russia transferred control of the shipyard to the Russian government under the control of the Ministry of Industry and Trade.

During the Russian Invasion of Ukraine, Russian sources reported that the facility was attacked by ten Ukrainian missiles and three USVs, injuring 24 people and damaging two unidentified ships during the early morning of 13 September 2023. The ships damaged were later identified as the landing ship Minsk and the Rostov-on-Don, a Kilo-class submarine.

The shipyard has built two special catamarans, each one formed by two barges, to move in place railway and highway arcs of the Crimean Bridge, and also tankers and other vessels.

== Facilities and services ==
The Sevmorverf is located on two production sites — Southern and Inkerman, with a total area of 53 hectares.

The shipyard operates three dry docks, a slipway for the assembly of floating crane hulls and ships, specialized shops and production sections, large warehouses, fitting-out embankments, and every other facility to secure the ship's vital systems and units.

Dock Capabilities
	Length	Beam	Draft	Portal crane, lifting capacity (tons)
Dock #1	290.0 meters (951.4 ft)	36.0 meters (118.1 ft)	11.0 meters (36.1 ft)	1 × 80; 1 × 10; 1 × 30; 1 × 16
Dock #2	173.4 meters (569 ft)	25.8 meters (85 ft)	9.1 meters (30 ft)	2 × 10
Dock #3	152.0 meters (498.7 ft)	25.8 meters (85 ft)	8.1 meters (27 ft)	1 × 10; 1 × 16

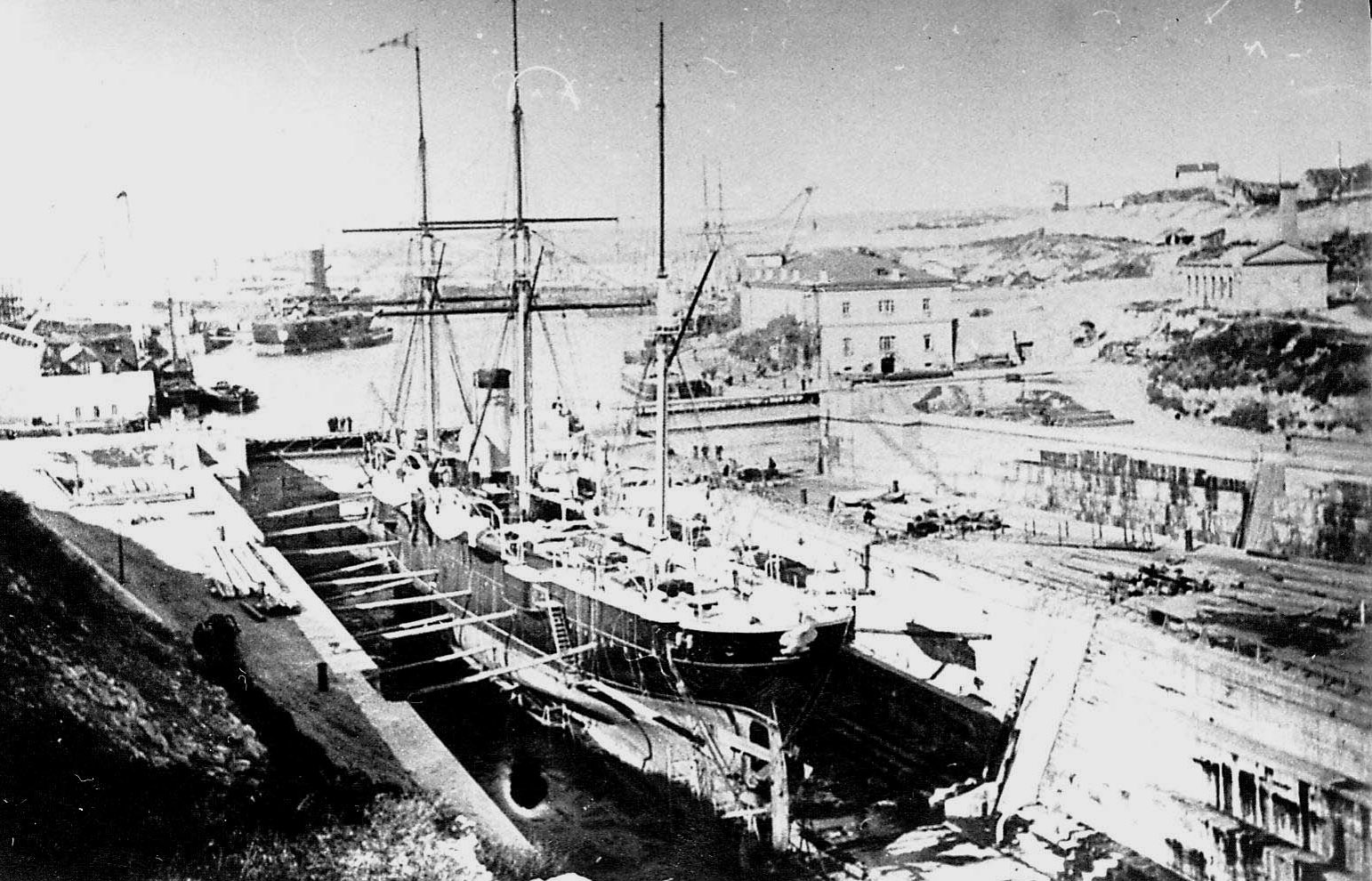
The cruiser Pamiat Merkuria in a drydock in Sevastopol

== Management ==
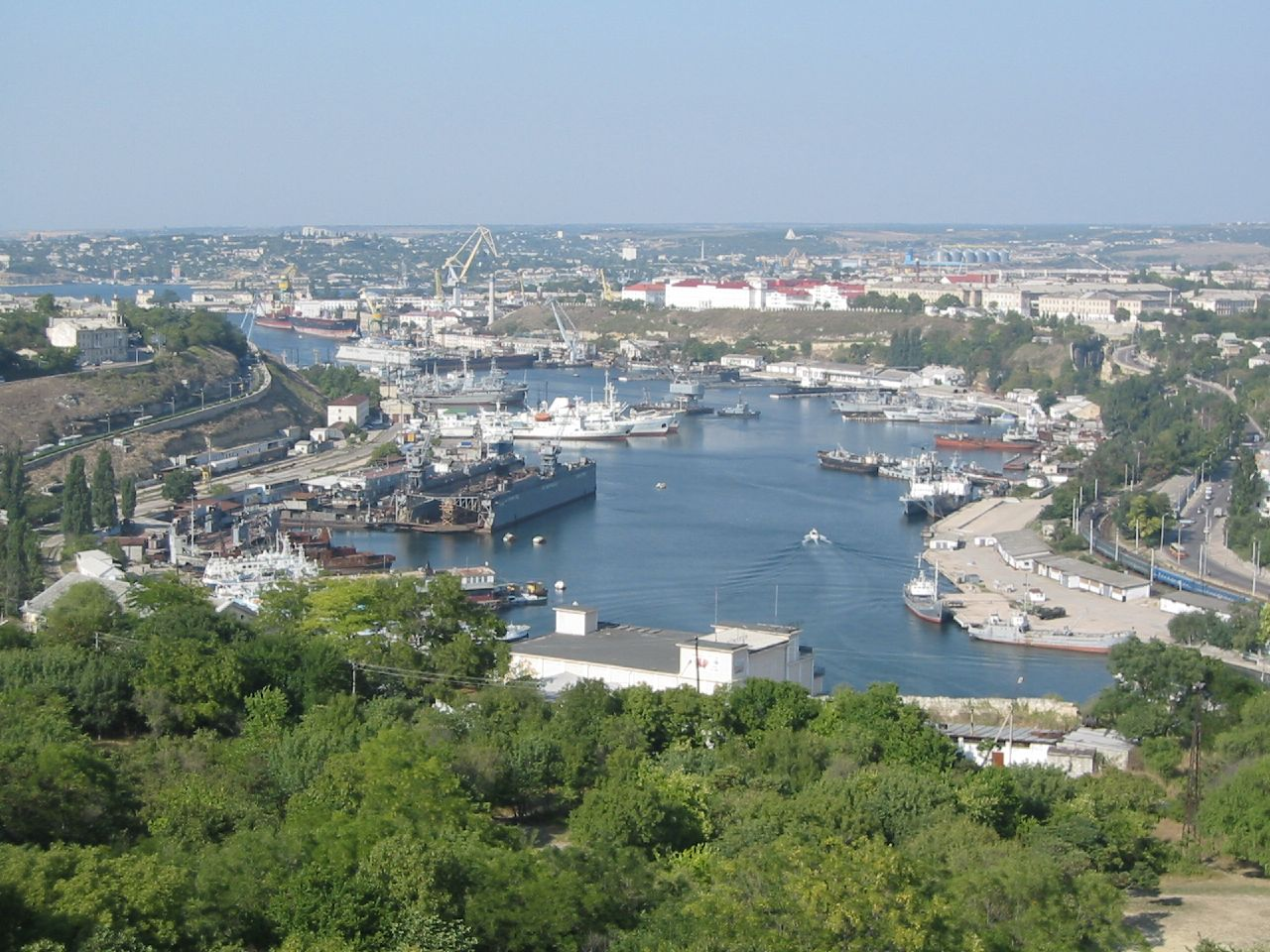
View of the Sevastopol port

- ? - 1986 — Viktor Podbyeltsev
- 1986-2006 — Anatoliy Cherevatyy
- ?-2010 — Oleksandr Prokaza
- 2010-2015 — Kostyantyn Kartoshkin
- Since March 5, 2015 — Yuriy Khaliulin (acting)
- Since March 31, 2015 — Oleksandr Yuryiv

== List of products ==
The production list mainly consists of tankers, fishing boats, pontoons and barges.

- Repaired Chersonesos
- Pontoons, Barges
- Repaired or float medium marine tanker ChF Iman
- Repaired many ships and boats
- Larger dry dock north east repaired or either float out two to five or six tankers or other larger vessel for the 157 and 175 meter docks.
- Inkerman dock yard repaired few and scrapped many vessels.
- Floating Docks works

== Awards ==
- Order of the Red Banner of Labour (1923)
- Order of Lenin (1966)
- Order of the October Revolution (1983)

== See also ==
- List of ships of Russia by project number
- List of Soviet and Russian submarine classes

== Bibliography ==
- Breyer, Siegfried (1992). Soviet Warship Development: Volume 1: 1917-1937. London: Conway Maritime Press. ISBN 0-85177-604-3.
- Harrison, Mark; Cooper, Julian; Dexter, Keith & Rodionov, Ivan (2003). The Numbered Factories and Other Establishments of the Soviet Defence Industry Complex, 1927 to 1968, Part I, Factories & Shipyards (Version 8 ed.). Warwick, UK: University of Warwick, Department of Economics.
- Polmar, Norman (1983). Guide to the Soviet Navy (3rd ed.). Annapolis, Maryland: Naval Institute Press. ISBN 0-87021-239-7.
- Tredrea, John & Sozaev, Eduard (2010). Russian Warships in the Age of Sail, 1696–1860: Design, Construction, Careers and Fates. Barnsley, UK: Seaforth Publishing. ISBN 978-1-84832-058-1.
