= Russian submarine Rostov-na-Donu =

Russian Kilo-class attack submarine

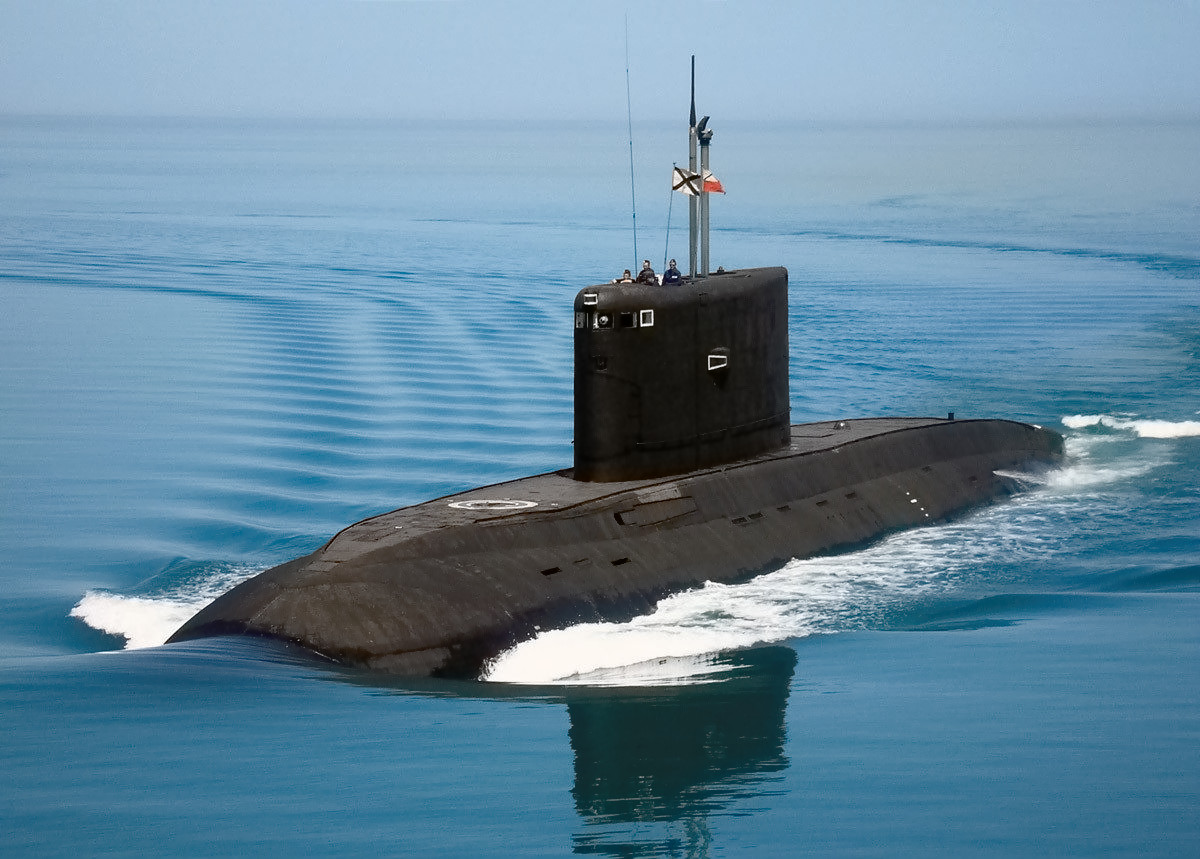
- B-237 Rostov-na-Donu in 2014

History

Russia
- Name: B-237 Rostov-na-Donu
- Namesake: Rostov-on-Don
- Laid down: 21 November 2011
- Launched: 26 June 2014
- Commissioned: 30 December 2014
- Status: Damaged by Storm Shadow and/or SCALP missiles, 13 September 2023. Claimed sunk by missile attack, 2 August 2024. Docked in Sevastopol due to damages suffered during the strikes

General characteristics
- Class & type: Kilo-class submarine
- Displacement: 2,350 t (2,310 long tons) surfaced; 3,100 t (3,100 long tons)
- Length: 74 m (242 ft 9 in)
- Beam: 9.9 m (32 ft 6 in)
- Draft: 6.1 m (20 ft 0 in)
- Propulsion: Diesel-electric propulsion; 2 × diesel generators; 1 × electric motor; 1 × shaft
- Endurance: 45 days
- Test depth: 300 m (984 ft 3 in)
- Complement: 52 officers and sailors
- Armament: 6 × 553 mm (21.8 in) torpedo tubes

Rostov-na-Donu (B-237) (Russian: Б-237 «Ростов-на-Дону») is a Project 636.3 (NATO reporting name Improved Kilo II–class) diesel-electric attack submarine of the Russian Navy. It was laid down on 21 November 2011, launched on 26 June 2014, and commissioned on 26 December 2014, becoming part of Russia's Black Sea Fleet.

In 2015 it was deployed as part of the Mediterranean Sea Task Force during the Russian intervention in the Syrian civil war. Rostov-na-Donu fired Kalibr cruise missiles at Islamic State targets in Raqqa Governorate, Syria, on 8 December 2015, becoming the first Russian submarine to fire shots in combat since World War II. Rostov-na-Donu was later in a drydock in Sevastopol when it was heavily damaged in a Ukrainian attack on 13 September 2023. It was later restored, but was reportedly hit again and allegedly sunk on 2 August 2024. Later on 22 September 2025, it was reported that the submarine was docked in Sevastopol, but out of service due to damage suffered from the strikes in 2024.

== Design ==
It was developed starting in 1974 by the Rubin Design Bureau as the Project 877 (NATO reporting name Kilo-class) diesel-electric attack submarine for the Soviet Navy. In the 1990s the original design received upgrades to its stealth, propulsion, and automation, becoming the Project 636 (Improved Kilo class). Beginning from 2010, further improvements led to the Project 636.3 (Improved Kilo II class). The Improved Kilo II has a displacement of 2,350 tonnes (2,310 long tons) while surfaced and 3,100 tonnes (3,100 long tons) while under water. It has a length of 74 metres (242 ft 9 in), a beam of 9.9 metres (32 ft 6 in), and a draft of 6.1 metres (20 ft 0 in).

With diesel-electric propulsion, its single propeller shaft is driven by an electric motor, powered by two diesel generators, which give it a speed of 17 kn (31 km/h; 20 mph) on the surface or 20 kn (37 km/h; 23 mph) submerged. The submarine has a crew of 52 officers and sailors and can stay at sea for 45 days. Its maximum diving depth is reported as 300 metres (984 ft 3 in). The armament consists of six 553 mm (21.8 in) torpedo tubes, which can launch torpedoes, naval mines, or missiles. Some Improved Kilo II submarines are armed with variants of the Kalibr cruise missile, being able to hold up to four of them. Alternatively, they can hold up to 18 torpedoes or 24 naval mines.

== History ==
=== 2010s ===
Rostov-na-Donu is a diesel-electric submarine of the Improved Project 636.3 class of modern Russian ships. B-237 was built in Saint Petersburg shipyard, laid down on 21 November 2011, launched on 26 June 2014 and commissioned on 26 December 2014. It was part of the first batch of six Improved Kilo II submarines, which were built for the Black Sea Fleet, and formed its 4th Independent Submarine Brigade.

The submarine was assigned to the 4th Submarine Brigade of the Black Sea Fleet after completing training exercises off northern Russia, but was first deployed to the Mediterranean Sea Task Force in December 2015. Rostov-na-Donu joined the Russian intervention in the Syrian civil war and on 8 December 2015 fired Kalibr cruise missiles at Islamic State command centers in the Raqqa Governorate, Syria. The attack was later described by Russian Defense Minister Sergey Shoigu at a press conference with President Vladimir Putin. This made Rostov-na-Donu the first Russian submarine to fire in combat since World War II.

=== 2020s ===
In April 2020 Rostov-na-Donu returned to the Mediterranean for another deployment, as one of the attack submarines assigned to the Russian Navy task force there.

The submarine returned to the Black Sea in February 2022, passing the Bosporus on 13 February. With Rostov-na-Donu, the Russian Black Sea Fleet had four Improved Kilo–class submarines equipped with Kalibr land-attack missiles deployed in the Black Sea as of February 2022, at least three of which were believed to be active.

==== 13 September 2023 attack ====
On 13 September 2023, the Russian-appointed governor of Sevastopol Mikhail Razvozhaev said that Sevastopol Shipyard, belonging to Sevmorzavod, had been struck by a Ukrainian "missile attack" at 2 am, causing a large fire. The Russian Ministry of Defence said that ten cruise missiles had been fired, of which seven were shot down. The attack also involved three "maritime drones", which were said to have been destroyed. The Ministry said, "As a result of being hit by enemy cruise missiles, two ships under repair were damaged". At least 24 people were reported injured. The ships damaged were the landing ship Minsk and Rostov-na-Donu. Ukraine said the two ships were "likely damaged beyond repair". The Russian government denied this, and said they would be repaired and returned to full operational status. Based on open-source imagery, the UK Ministry of Defence assessed that the submarine had "likely suffered catastrophic damage."

On 18 September, two images were leaked online of the damage to Rostov-na-Donu, which appeared to be extensive. Two large breaches in the hull of the submarine could be seen, one around the midpoint of the starboard side to the rear of the conning tower and another on the top bow. Due to the nature of the damage, it was assessed that the submarine would be out of action for the duration of the war due to the closing of the Dardanelles Straits to all foreign warships at the beginning of the Russian invasion of Ukraine in accordance with the terms of the Montreux Convention. The submarine would need to be transported to the Admiralty Shipyards in Saint Petersburg to be repaired; however it is assessed to be more practical for a new submarine of the class to be constructed due to the extensive repairs that would be required.

==== 2 August 2024 attack ====
Ukrainian forces claimed Rostov-na-Donu "sank on the spot" after a drone and missile strike on Sevastopol that also damaged an S-400 launcher. The submarine had been repaired after the 2023 attack, and was undergoing testing off Sevastopol. The British Ministry of Defence stated that it was, "highly likely" that the submarine was sunk as Newsweek published satellite imagery alleging the submarine was replaced by a decoy with the genuine submarine partially hidden beneath a tarp nearby. As of 1 September 2025, Oryx has not listed the submarine as having been sunk. On 22 September 2025, Atesh claimed that the submarine was docked in one of Sevastopol's bays and that it still was out of service due to damage suffered from the attack in 2024.
