= Russian landing ship Olenegorsky Gornyak =

Ropucha class landing ship of the Russian Navy

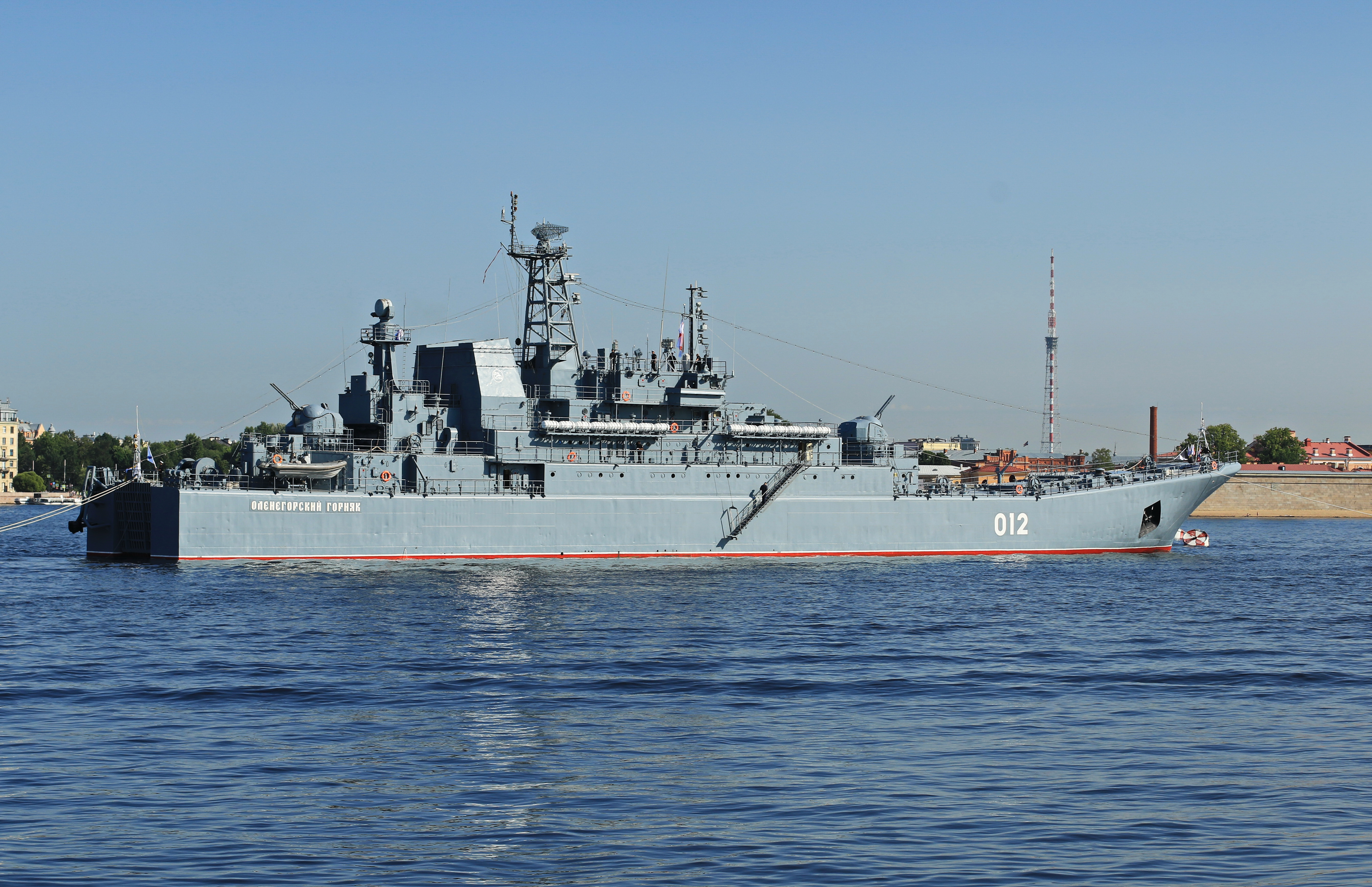
- Olenegorsky Gornyak in 2021

History

Russia
- Name: Olenegorsky Gornyak
- Namesake: Olenegorsk Mining and Processing Plant
- Builder: Stocznia Północna, Gdańsk, Poland
- Commissioned: 30 June 1976

General characteristics
- Class & type: Ropucha-class landing ship
- Displacement: 2,768 long tons (2,812 t) standard; 4,012 long tons (4,076 t) full load
- Length: 112.5 m (369 ft 1 in)
- Beam: 15.01 m (49 ft 3 in)
- Draught: 4.26 m (14 ft 0 in)
- Ramps: Over bows and at stern
- Installed power: 3 × 750 kW (1,006 hp) diesel generators
- Propulsion: 2 × 9,600 hp (7,159 kW) Zgoda-Sulzer 16ZVB40/48 diesel engines
- Speed: 17.59 knots (32.58 km/h; 20.24 mph)
- Range: 6,000 nmi (11,000 km; 6,900 mi) at 12 knots (22 km/h; 14 mph); 3,500 nmi (6,500 km; 4,000 mi) at 16 knots (30 km/h; 18 mph)
- Endurance: 30 days
- Capacity: 10 × main battle tanks and 340 troops or 12 × BTR APC and 340 troops or 3 × main battle tanks, 3 × 2S9 Nona-S SPG, 5 × MT-LB APC, 4 trucks and 313 troops or 500 tons of cargo
- Complement: 98
- Armament: 2 × AK-725 twin 57 mm (2.2 in) DP guns; 4 × 8 Strela 2 SAM launchers; 2 × 22 A-215 Grad-M rocket launchers

Olenegorsky Gornyak (Russian: Оленегорский горняк, 'Olenegorsk Miner'), formerly known as BDK-91, is a Project 775, Ropucha-class landing ship of the Russian Navy. Landing ships launch amphibious forces close to shore, and can dock and quickly unload cargo.

== History ==
On 4 August 2023, during the Russian invasion of Ukraine, the ship was reportedly damaged and listing by a joint effort of the Ukrainian SBU and the Ukrainian Navy using a sea drone at the naval base at the port of Novorossiysk. It was towed to port by the Russian Navy. The UK Ministry of Defence said on 5 August 2023 that the Olenegorsky Gornyak "almost certainly suffered serious damage", and the attack was "a significant blow" to the Russian Black Sea Fleet, which had relocated most of its units to Novorossiysk in response to the Ukrainian threat to its base in Sevastopol in Russian-occupied Crimea.

== See also ==
- List of ship losses during the Russo-Ukrainian War
