= Russian cruiser Pamiat Merkuria (1880) =

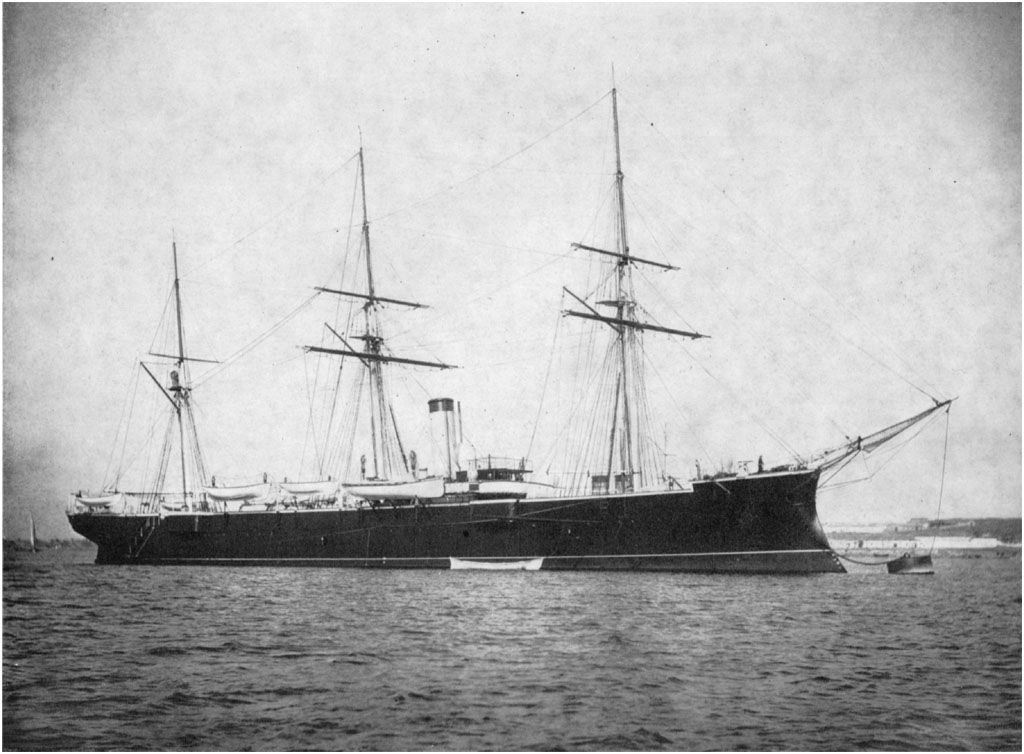

History

Russian Empire
- Name: Pamiat' Merkuria
- Builder: Société Nouvelle des Forges et Chantiers de la Méditerranée, Toulon
- Laid down: 1879
- Launched: 10 May 1880
- Commissioned: March 1882
- Stricken: 7 April 1907

General characteristics
- Type: Cruiser
- Displacement: 2,997 long tons (3,045 t)
- Length: 90 m (295 ft 3 in)
- Beam: 12.4 m (40 ft 8 in)
- Draught: 5.97 m (19 ft 7 in)
- Propulsion: 1 shaft horizontal compound steam engine, 6 boilers, 2,450 hp (1,830 kW)
- Speed: 14 knots (26 km/h; 16 mph)
- Range: 1,560 nmi (2,890 km)
- Complement: 12 officers and 331 men
- Armament: 6 × 1 - 152 mm (6 in) guns; 4 × 1 - 107 mm (4.2 in) 9-pounder guns; 4 × 1 - 47 mm (2 in) guns; 4 × 1 - 37 mm (1 in) guns; 4 × 381 mm (15.0 in) torpedo tubes

Pamiat' Merkuria (Russian: Память Меркурия) was an unarmored cruiser of the Imperial Russian Navy. She was initially named Yaroslavl (Russian: Ярославль), but was renamed on 9 April 1883.

== Design ==
She was a barque-rigged steel and iron ship with a ram bow. She had two unprotected 152 mm (6 in) guns as bow and stern chasers and the other four in unprotected sponsons on the upper deck. Her torpedo tubes were on swivels above water. She was reputedly a good sea boat.

== Service ==
Pamiat Merkuria was built for Dobroflot as a merchant ship capable of being converted into a cruiser in wartime. She was laid down as Yaroslavl at the Toulon shipyard of Forges et Chantiers de la Méditerranée in 1879, launched on 10 May 1880, and entered service on 9 September of that year. She was bought by the Naval Ministry on 2 March 1882 and on 18 April of that year became part of the Black Sea Fleet as a cruiser, being renamed Pamiat Merkuria on 9 April 1883. On 1 February 1892 she was reclassified as a 1st class cruiser, undergoing a refit between 1893 and 1894.

Now obsolete, she was removed from the combat fleet, disarmed, and handed over to the Sevastopol Military Port for mothballing on 18 March 1907. She was removed from the Black Sea Fleet on 25 March and renamed Merkuria. On 28 October 1915, during World War I, the ship returned to service in the Black Sea Fleet as a hulk, Blokshiv No. 9. She was also used as the headquarters of the Black Sea Fleet Torpedo Division.

Taken over by revolutionaries on 16 December 1917, she was captured in Sevastopol by German troops on 1 May 1918, then by Anglo-French forces on 24 November and turned over to the White Volunteer Army. On 31 March 1919 she was reclassified as a tender for the minesweepers of the Naval Forces of South Russia, before being recaptured by the forces of the Red Army's Ukrainian Front on 29 April. The ship was again captured by the Volunteer Army on 24 June, serving as an unpowered submarine tender for the Naval Forces of South Russia. When the Russian Army of Pyotr Wrangel evacuated from Sevastopol to Istanbul on 14 November 1920, she was abandoned and in December was included in the Black Sea Naval Forces of the Workers' and Peasants' Red Navy. The ship was converted to an unpowered transport-workshop on 8 August 1921 and on 31 October 1922 returned to the subclass of torpedo hulks and joined the division of patrol and torpedo boats. On 25 December she again became a hulk, being renamed Merkury.

The hulk was placed in reserve on 1 October 1929, and removed from the list of ships of the Red Fleet on 9 March 1932 pending transfer to Rudmetalltorgu for scrapping. However, the hulk was instead used as an auxiliary craft by the People's Commissariat for Water Transport. On 31 August 1938 it was converted into a floating storage tank of the Odessa Commercial Sea Port, and on 20 September 1939 removed from the list of watercraft of the People's Commissariat for the Marine Fleet pending transfer to Glavvtorchermet for scrapping.

== See also ==
- Bogatyr-class protected cruiser Pamiat Merkuria
