= Russian landing ship Minsk =

Ropucha-class landing ship

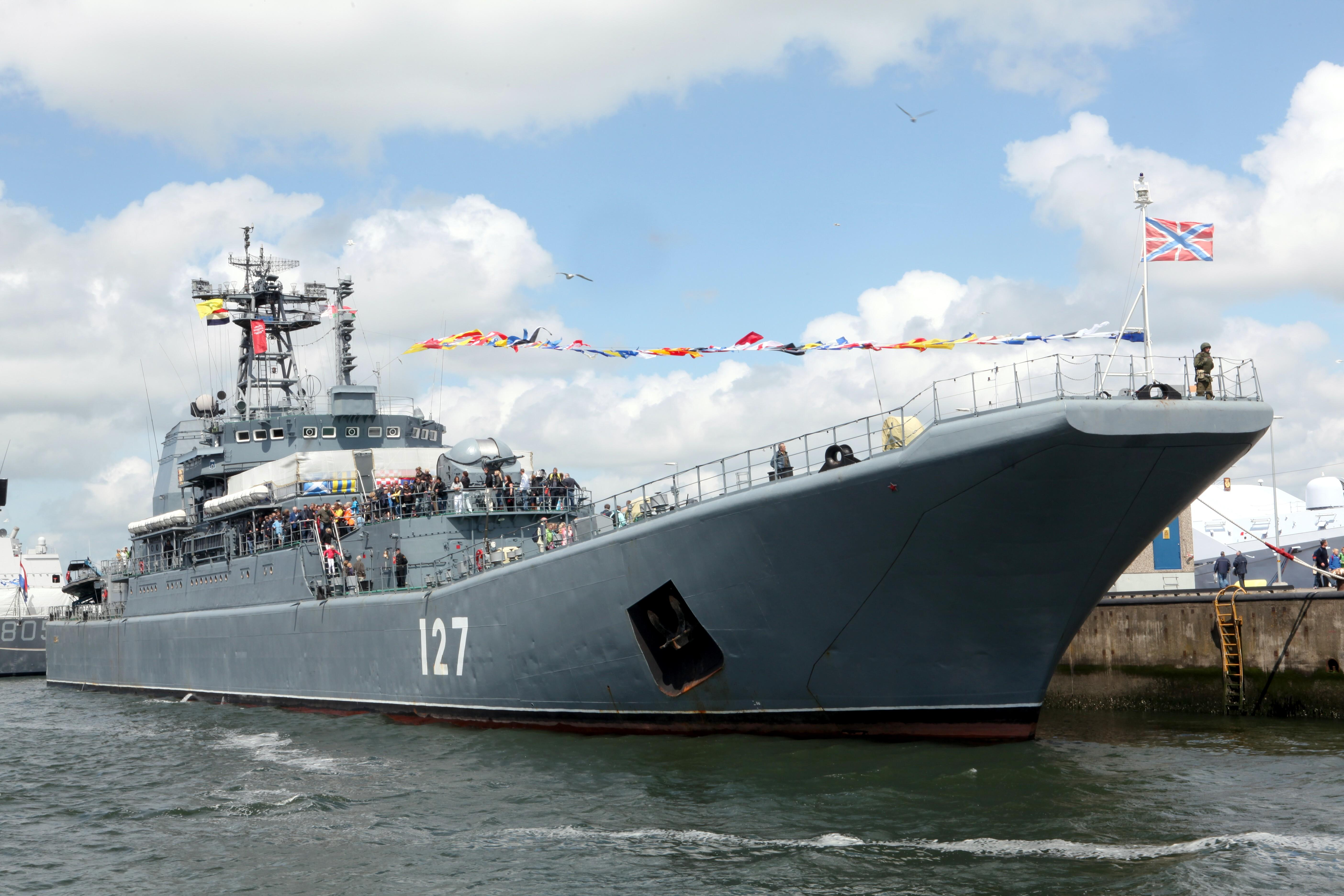
- Minsk in 2011

History

Russia
- Name: Minsk
- Namesake: Minsk
- Builder: Stocznia Północna, Gdańsk, Poland
- Commissioned: 30 May 1983
- Fate: Damaged in a missile strike on 13 September 2023

General characteristics
- Class & type: Ropucha-class landing ship
- Displacement: 2,768 long tons (2,812 t) standard; 4,012 long tons (4,076 t) full load
- Length: 112.5 m (369 ft 1 in)
- Beam: 15.01 m (49 ft 3 in)
- Draught: 4.26 m (14 ft 0 in)
- Ramps: Over bows and at stern
- Installed power: 3 × 750 kW (1,006 hp) diesel generators
- Propulsion: 2 × 9,600 hp (7,159 kW) Zgoda-Sulzer 16ZVB40/48 diesel engines
- Speed: 17.59 knots (32.58 km/h; 20.24 mph)
- Range: 6,000 nmi (11,000 km; 6,900 mi) at 12 knots (22 km/h; 14 mph); 3,500 nmi (6,500 km; 4,000 mi) at 16 knots (30 km/h; 18 mph)
- Endurance: 30 days
- Capacity: 10 × main battle tanks and 340 troops or 12 × BTR APC and 340 troops or 3 × main battle tanks, 3 × 2S9 Nona-S SPG, 5 × MT-LB APC, 4 trucks and 313 troops or 500 tons of cargo
- Complement: 98
- Armament: 2 × AK-725 twin 57 mm (2.2 in) DP guns; 4 × 8 Strela 2 SAM launchers; 2 × 22 A-215 Grad-M rocket launchers

Minsk (Russian: Минск) is a Ropucha-class landing ship of the Russian Navy. The ship was built in the Gdańsk Shipyard in Gdańsk, Poland for the Soviet Navy, and was commissioned in 1983. Minsk is a part of the Russian Black Sea Fleet. On 13 September 2023, the ship was damaged in a Ukrainian missile attack on Sevastopol Shipyard.

== Role in the Russo-Ukrainian war ==
Minsk was transferred to Sevastopol, travelling through the Dardanelles on 9 February 2022, as part of a fleet of six landing ships brought into the Black Sea on what Russia called exercises, whilst it denied preparing for an attack on Ukraine. At the time there was some speculation that Russia might make an amphibious attack on Ukraine.

=== Missile attack on Minsk ===
During 2023, a number of different attacks were made on the Russian fleet in Sevastopol, but Minsk remained in port. On 13 September 2023, Russian officials reported aerial and marine attacks on Sevastopol. They said that three naval drones had been destroyed but some cruise missiles had hit the dockyard causing fires and damage to Minsk and the Kilo-class submarine Rostov-na-Donu (B-237). Various sources reported that the attacks were made with the French and UK-supplied Storm Shadow/SCALP cruise missiles launched from a Ukrainian Air Force Sukhoi Su-24 aircraft. Based on open-source imagery, the UK Ministry of Defence has assessed that the vessel has "almost certainly been functionally destroyed" by the strike. Ukraine claimed the two ships were "likely damaged beyond repair", which the Russian government denied and stated they would be repaired and returned to full operational status.

The Ukrainians later also claimed that the strike killed 62 Russian personnel, and that many of them were aboard the ship because Minsk had been scheduled to depart on 14 September for combat duty. In early 2024, it was reported that the Russians would attempt to repair the ship though it was unclear whether this would be possible given the heavy damage sustained.

== See also ==
- List of ship losses during the Russo-Ukrainian War
