= 2S9 Nona =

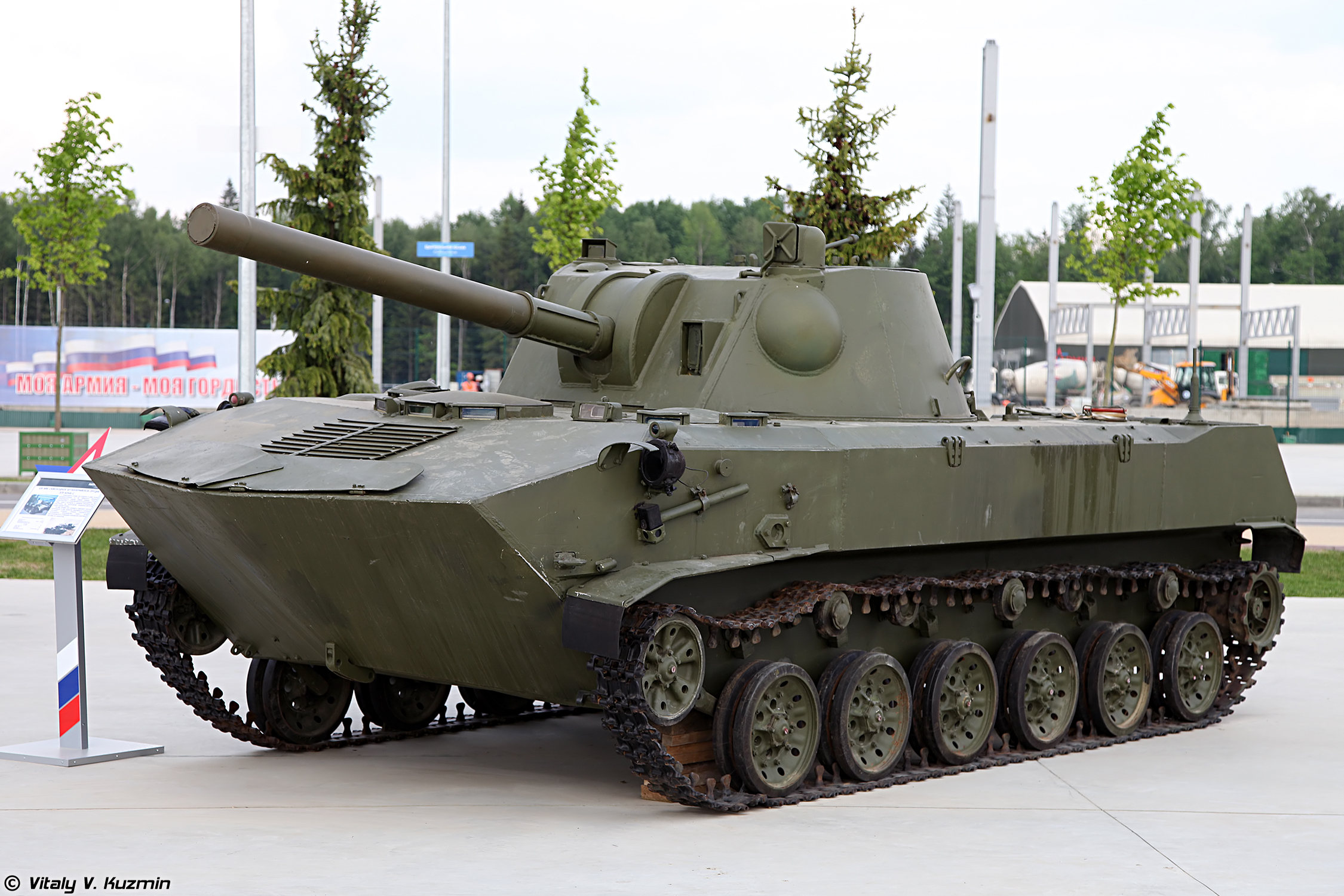
- 2S9 Nona-S 120 mm self-propelled mortar, 2016
- Type: Air-droppable self-propelled mortar
- Place of origin: Soviet Union

Service history
- In service: 1981–present
- Used by: see Operators
- Wars: Soviet-Afghan War; Russo-Georgian War; Syrian Civil War; Russo-Ukrainian War

Production history
- Designer: TsNIITochMash
- Designed: 1974–1980
- Manufacturer: Motovilikha Plants
- Produced: 1979–1989

Specifications
- Mass: 8.7 t (8.6 long tons; 9.6 short tons)
- Length: 6.02 m (19.8 ft)
- Barrel length: 1.8 or 2.88 m (5 ft 11 in or 9 ft 5 in)
- Width: 2.63 m (8 ft 8 in)
- Height: 2.3 m (7 ft 7 in)
- Crew: 4
- Caliber: 120 mm
- Elevation: -4 to +80 degrees
- Traverse: 70 degrees
- Rate of fire: 10 rpm, max; 4 rpm, sustained
- Effective firing range: 8.8 km (5.5 mi) (conventional); 12.8 km (8.0 mi) (extended)
- Armor: 15 mm (0.59 in) max
- Main armament: 120 mm 2A60 mortar
- Engine: 5D20 Diesel; 180 kW (240 hp)
- Power/weight: 20.2 kW (27.1 hp) per tonne
- Payload capacity: 40-60 rounds
- Suspension: torsion
- Ground clearance: 450 mm (18 in)
- Fuel capacity: 400 L (88 imp gal; 110 US gal)
- Operational range: 500 km (310 mi)
- Maximum speed: 60 km/h (37 mph) (road); 9 km/h (5.6 mph) (water)

The 2S9 NONA (Russian: Новейшее Орудие Наземной Артилерии, lit. 'Newest Ordnance of Ground Artillery') is a self-propelled and air-droppable 120 mm mortar designed in the Soviet Union, which entered service in 1981. The 2S9 chassis is designated the S-120 and based on the aluminium hull of the BTR-D airborne multi-purpose tracked armoured personnel carrier. More generally, the 120 mm mortar is referred to as the Nona, with the 2S9 also known as the Nona-S. Although no figures have been released, it is estimated that over 1,000 2S9 were built.

== Description ==
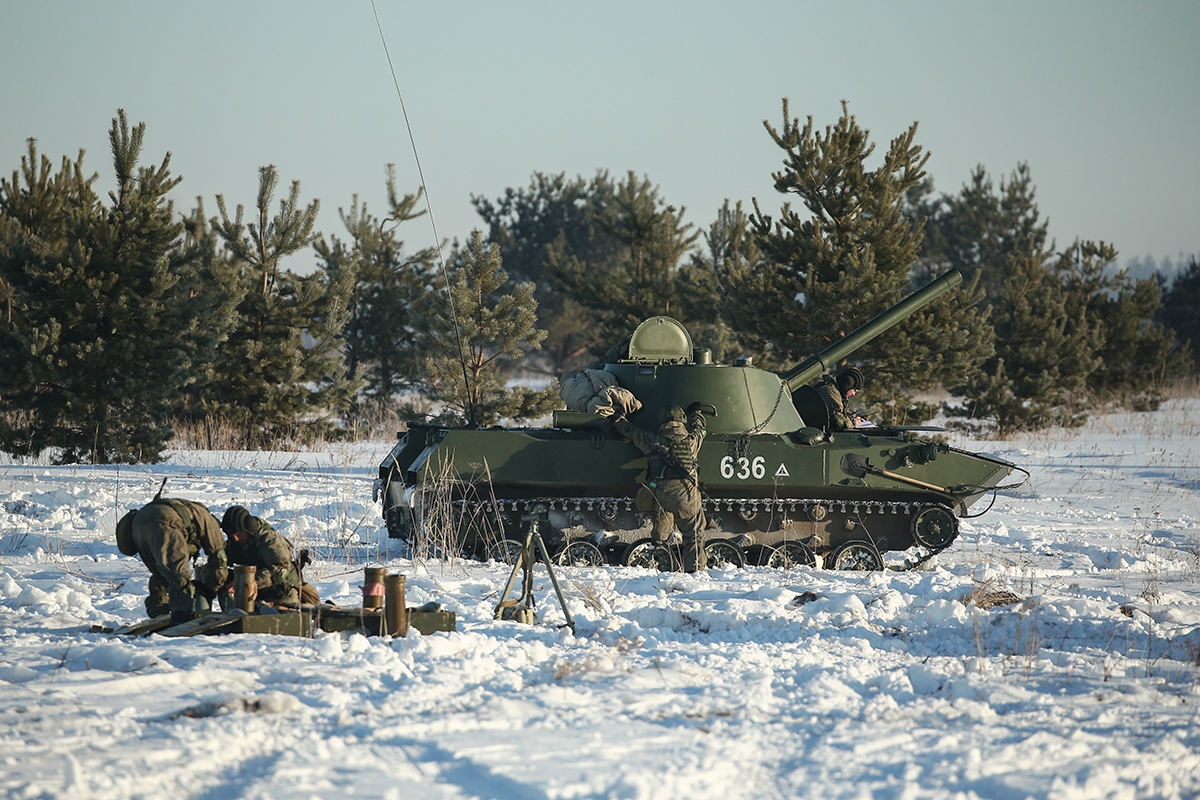
2S9 Nona-S of the 106th Guards Airborne Division in firing position during field exercises, 2018

The 2S9 Nona-S is an amphibious vehicle that can be propelled through the water by two rear water-jets. It is operated by a four-man crew comprising a commander, a driver/mechanic, a gunner, and a loader. The hull interior is separated into a command compartment, a fighting compartment and an engine compartment. A welded steel turret is located at the middle of the hull. The two-man turret has hatches for the gunner and loader respectively.

The 2S9 utilizes a 120 mm 2A51 mortar with a 1.8 m (5 ft 11 in) barrel. The weapon is actually a hybrid of a mortar and howitzer, being an unconventional design that lacks a direct NATO counterpart. It is a rifled, breech-loaded weapon capable of firing HE (high explosive), white phosphorus and smoke rounds, as well as laser-guided munitions like KM-8 Gran. It can engage in indirect and direct fire, as well as targeting armoured vehicles; its armour-piercing rounds can penetrate the equivalent of 600–650 mm (24–26 in) of steel plate at up to 1 km (0.62 mi).

=== Operational history ===
In May 2014, in the course of the Siege of Sloviansk, during the first stages of the Donbas War, separatist forces used a Nona-S to engage Ukrainian positions surrounding the city. The vehicle was destroyed by the besieging Ukrainian Army on 31 May 2014.

The Nona was also deployed by Russia during the 2022 Russian invasion of Ukraine. In July 2022, video on social media purportedly shows Ukrainian forces using M777 to destroy a towed 2B16 Nona-K in Hoptivka on the border with Russia. In August 2022, Ukraine's armed forces claimed to use four captured Russian 2S9 against Russian forces. In November 2022, a 2S23-SVK Nona was photographed in Ukrainian service. It was reportedly captured from Russian forces and took months to refit.

On 26 March 2024, Ukrainian forces destroyed a Russia 2S9 Nona 120 mm mortar with a GLSDB and left another “burning” in Zaporizhzhia. In June 2024 Ukraine used a drone to destroy a 2S9 Nona that had been equipped with turtle tank style add on armour.

== Variants ==
Variants of the 120 mm Nona mortar:

- 2S23 Nona-SVK – BTR-80-based chassis mounting a 2A60 mortar, a variant of the 2A50.
- 2B16 Nona-K – A towed version. Fitted with a muzzle brake.
- 2S31 Vena – Is a similar concept based on the BMP-3 chassis. Longer barrel for increased range.
- 2S17-2 Nona-SV – A BRM-1K with a 2S9 Nona turret, in use by the Ukrainian Ground Forces.

== Operators ==
=== Current operators ===
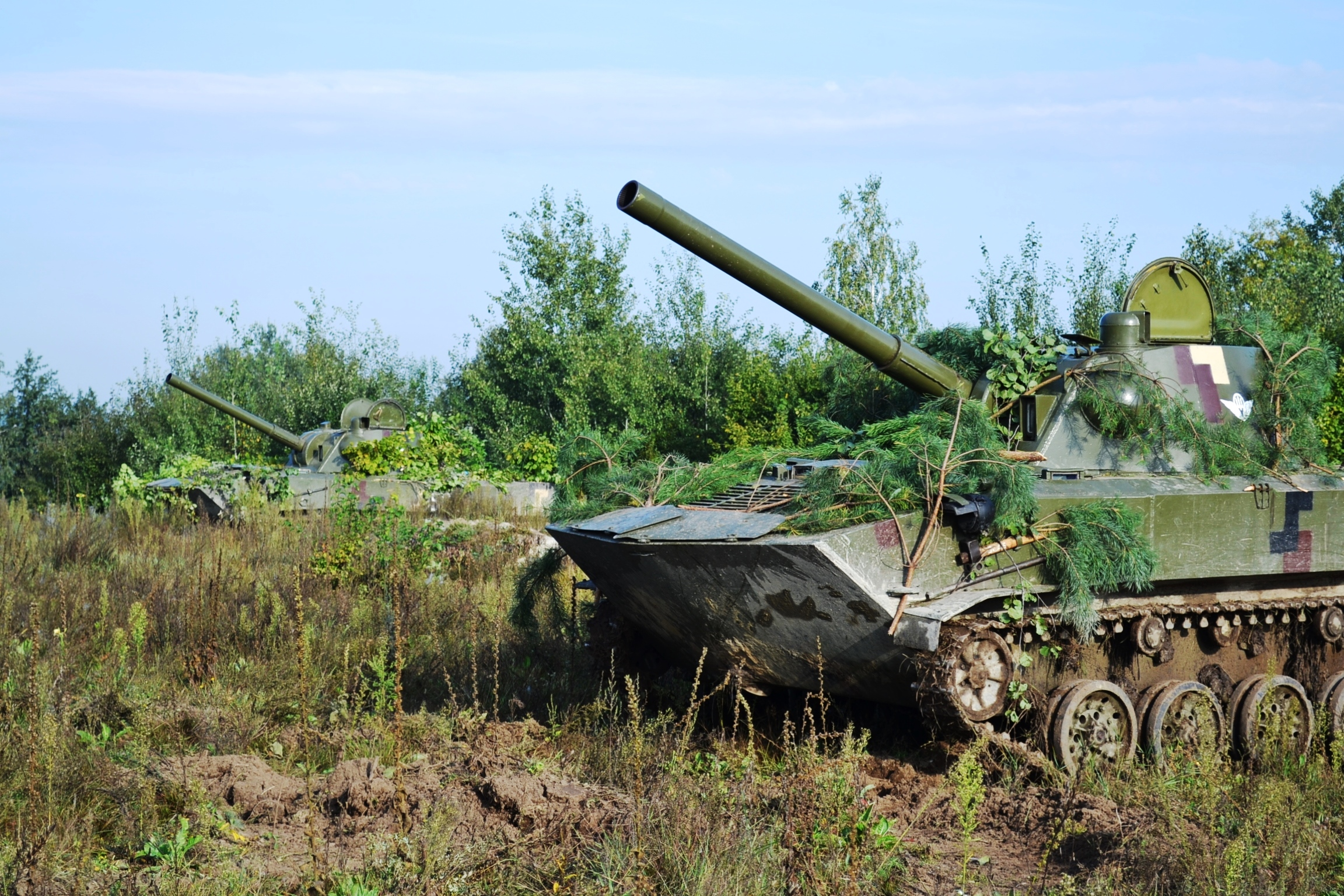
2S9 Nona-S of the Armed Forces of Ukraine, 2018

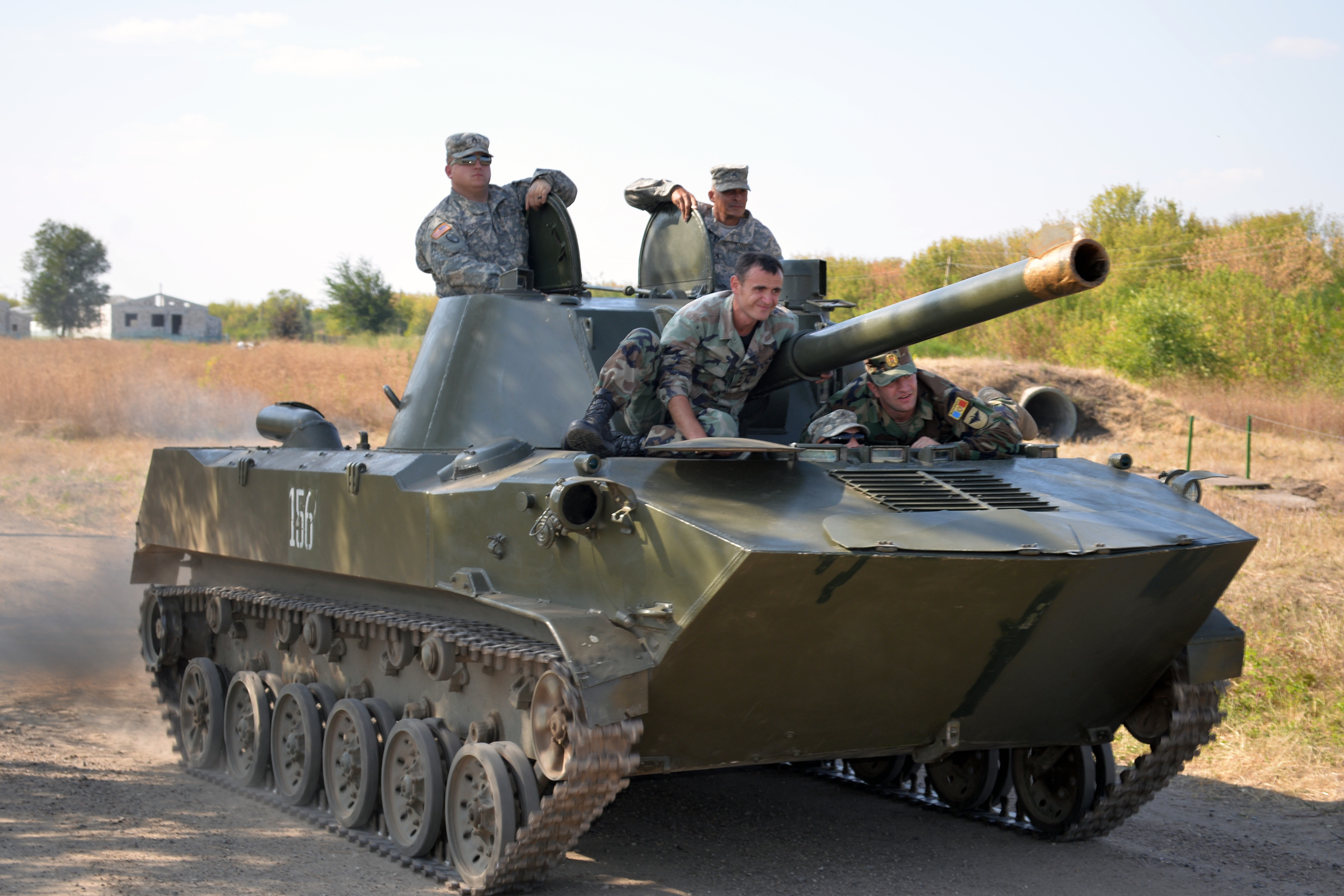
A 2S9 Nona of the Moldovan Ground Forces, 2016

- Azerbaijan: 18 2S9
- Belarus: 18 2B23 Nona-M1
- Kyrgyzstan: 12 2S9
- Moldova: 9 2S9
- Russia: 446 (excluding 500 2S9 in store in an unknown condition): 280 2S9 Nona-S, 42 2S23 Nona-SVK and 124 2B16 Nona-K
- Syria - Quantity unknown
- Turkmenistan: 17 2S9
- Ukraine: 2 2B16 and 40 2S9. 2S9 and 2B16 versions have been used by both sides during Russo-Ukrainian War
- Uzbekistan: 54 2S9
- Venezuela - 18 Nona SVK, ordered 2009, delivered 2011–2012. 13 in service as of 2016.

=== Former operators ===
- India
- Iraq
- Soviet Union
