= List of Vostok exercises =

Series of Soviet Union and Russian Federation military exercises

Vostok exercise ('Exercise East') is a series of Soviet Union and Russian Federation military exercises. They are conducted by the Russian Armed Forces every four years in the eastern part of the country. The exercises include:

- Vostok 2010, held in Siberia and the country's Far East from June 29 to July 8, 2010.
- Vostok 2014, held in September 19-25 2014 in Eastern Military District in the ranges of Sakhalin, Kamchatka, Chukotka, and southern Primorsky Krai.
- Vostok 2018, held from 11 to 17 September 2018, throughout Siberia and the Russian Far East in the Eastern Military District.
- Vostok 2022, held in the Russian Eastern Military District (encompassing Siberia and the country's Far East, including the Sea of Japan and the Sea of Okhotsk) from September 1 to September 7, 2022.

== See also ==
- List of Zapad exercises
- List of Center exercises
- List of Kavkaz military exercises
