= Zapad 2017 =

2017 Russian-Belarusian strategic military exercise

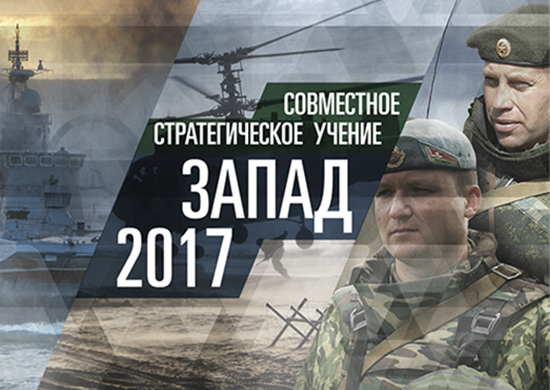
- The Russian MoD's collage for the Zapad 2017 exercise
- Date: September 14–20, 2017
- Location: Belarus and Russia

Number
12,400-12,700	

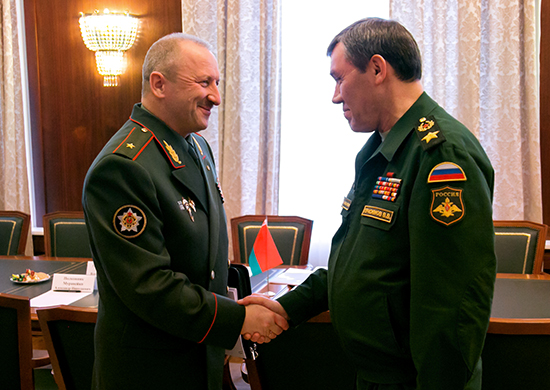
The leaders of the exercise; Russian Chief of the General Staff Valery Gerasimov and his Belarusian counterpart Oleg Belokonev

Zapad 2017 (Russian: «Запад-2017», Belarusian: Захад-2017, lit. West 2017) was a joint strategic military exercise of the armed forces of the Russian Federation and Belarus (the Union State) that formally began on 14 September 2017 and ended on 20 September 2017, in Belarus as well as in Russia's Kaliningrad Oblast and Russia's other north-western areas in the Western Military District. According to the information made public by the Defence Ministry of Belarus prior to the exercise, fewer than 13,000 personnel of the Union State were to take part in the military maneuvers, a number that was not supposed to trigger mandatory formal notification and invitation of observers under the OSCE's Vienna Document.

Prior to the exercise, Western military analysts and officials cited the total number of Russian troops, security personnel and civilian officials to be involved in the broader war-games as being up to 100,000, which would make them Russia's largest since the Cold War. However, Western analysis after the drills put the troops number estimate significantly closer to the officially announced figures, with Thomas Möller, a Swedish officer observing the exercise, reporting only 12,400 troops present, slightly less than the Belarus claim of 12,700. Since 2016, concerns had been voiced by a number of NATO and Ukrainian officials over Russia's suspected ulterior motives and objectives in connection with the exercise.

== Advance information about the drills and invitation of monitors ==
Belarus is a member of the Collective Security Treaty Organization (CSTO), a Eurasian military alliance of some of the former USSR republics led by Russia; Belarus chairs the bloc in 2017. The Belarusian–Russian strategic Zapad and operative Shchit Soyuza (Russian: «Щит Союза») exercises are scheduled events that are meant to be held on alternate years, in Belarus and Russia respectively, pursuant to the agreement reached by presidents of Russia and Belarus in September 2009.

Previous post-Soviet Zapad exercises were Zapad 1999, Zapad 2009, and Zapad 2013.

The plan of the exercise was approved by Belarus president Alexander Lukashenko on 20 March 2017: it envisaged two stages and its theme was defined as "the use of groupings of troops (forces) in the interests of ensuring the military security of the Union State". The number of troops to be involved, according to Belarusian Defense Minister Andrei Ravkov, would not to exceed the threshold stipulated by the 2011 Vienna Document – no more than 13,000 personnel; geographically, it would span from multiple locations in Belarus to the Kola Peninsula within Russia's Arctic Circle. It was expected that some units of Russia's 1st Guards Tank Army, which was reconstituted in 2014, as well as 25 Russian aircraft would take part in the exercise in Belarus. According to Western media reports in July 2017, the tank army's task would be to establish a forward command post in western Belarus, and to hold exercises in training areas near the city of Brest. On 13 July 2017, the NATO-Russia Council convened in Brussels, in the course of which the two sides briefed each other on their upcoming drills: Zapad 2017 and NATO's Exercise Trident Javelin 2017. At the end of August 2017, Russian defence ministry said that the exercise would rehearse an anti-terrorist and purely defensive scenario that is not specific to any particular region and "may emerge in any location of the world". The plan of the exercise envisaged a conflict between the alliance of Russia and Belarus and the coalition of fictional Lubenia, Vesbaria, and Veyshnoria, the latter within the borders of Belarus.

Observers from NATO were invited to Zapad-2017 by both Belarus and Russia. The Belarusian foreign ministry said in mid-July 2017 that they had notified all the OSCE countries and intended to invite observers from a number of international organisations as well as from Latvia, Lithuania, Poland, Ukraine, Estonia (NATO contact state in Belarus in 2017), Sweden, and Norway. Also, Belarusian president Alexander Lukashenko invited the U.S. delegation to the Parliamentary Assembly of the Organization for Security and Co-operation in Europe. On 12 July 2017, in Vienna, Major-General Pavel Muraveiko, Deputy Chief of the General Staff of the Armed Forces of Belarus, gave a detailed briefing on Zapad-2017 to the participants of the OSCE conference.

In mid-August, Lithuania said that it would send its military observers to the Zapad 2017 drills, in Belarus and Leningrad Oblast. Latvia, who previously, on 14 August, said it was still awaiting the relevant invitation from Russia, said it would send 3 observers, including its military attaché in Moscow, who was invited as an observer by Moscow. On 22 August, the Belarusian defence ministry said that observers from the UN, OSCE, NATO, Commonwealth of Independent States (CIS), Collective Security Treaty Organization (CSTO), and International Committee of the Red Cross as well as from Latvia, Lithuania, Poland, Ukraine, Estonia, Sweden, and Norway had been invited to Zapad 2017.

On 24 August, NATO Secretary-General Jens Stoltenberg said that the military alliance would send two experts to attend the war games, after Minsk extended invitation; he said that Belarus had invited NATO to attend five distinguished visitors' days during the drills, and Russia had invited NATO to one such visitors' day; Stoltenberg said attending distinguished visitors' days did not constitute real monitoring and that NATO was seeking "a more thorough way of observing" Zapad 2017. The following day, the Russian foreign ministry issued a statement that dismissed NATO's complaints about alleged lack of transparency as ungrounded; the statement reiterated that the exercise would involve up to 12,700 servicepersons, namely 7,200 from the armed forces of Belarus and 5,500 from the Russian forces, including 3,000 persons on the territory of Belarus.

On the eve of the exercise, the Belarusian foreign ministry said it had received an "unprecedented number" of accreditation requests from foreign news media (about 270).

The Philippine Army sent a ″high-level delegation to observe the final stage″ of Zapad 2017 in Luzhsky Testing Range in Leningrad Oblast, which was presented by the Philippine Ambassador to Russia Carlos D. Sorreta as ″just the beginning of what we expect to be a robust army-to-army engagement in the years to come."

== Expert opinions and speculations prior to the drills ==
Months prior to the Zapad 2017 exercise, NATO officials and Western military analysts began to speculate about the true number of troops to be involved as well as Russia's possible objectives other than those publicly announced. Such speculations were based on what was perceived as Russia's record of unannounced snap military exercises, and use of drills as a cover for military incursions, as well as a development of Russia's military posture in the country's western regions undertaken in 2016 that suggested plans for a protracted large-scale war. Western analysts speculated in July 2017 that the total number of Russian troops, security personnel and civilian officials to be involved in the broader war-games will range from 60,000 to 100,000, which would make them Russia's largest since the Cold War.

The theories mainly focused on Russia's putative schemes to attack Ukraine and/or reinforce Russia's military presence in Belarus with a view to further threatening Poland and Lithuania, or the Suwałki Gap (the Lithuania–Poland border area) that is perceived by NATO strategists as vulnerable because of the geography. It was also suggested that the Union State created by Russia and Belarus in 1999 could be used by Russia as a legal cover to absorb Belarus.

On the other hand, Igor Sutyagin, a Research Fellow at the Royal United Services Institute for Defence and Security Studies in London, suggested in August 2017 that the Zapad 2017 exercise was primarily meant as "a show of force", with the main rational purpose to ensure Moscow is capable of moving its troops around quickly through the vast terrain; he also noted that Russia's military efforts were "already overstretched". Similar assessments were made by Andrzej Wilk, a Senior Fellow of the Centre for Eastern Studies, in his article published in early September 2017, as well as by some other Western experts. Wilk also judged Zapad 2017 to have become "the core of an information war between Russia and NATO". In the same vein, Finland's defense minister Jussi Niinisto opined that by reacting so loudly the "Western countries had swallowed the bait" laid by Moscow in its information war with NATO.

== Reactions of NATO, Ukraine, and Sweden prior to the drills ==
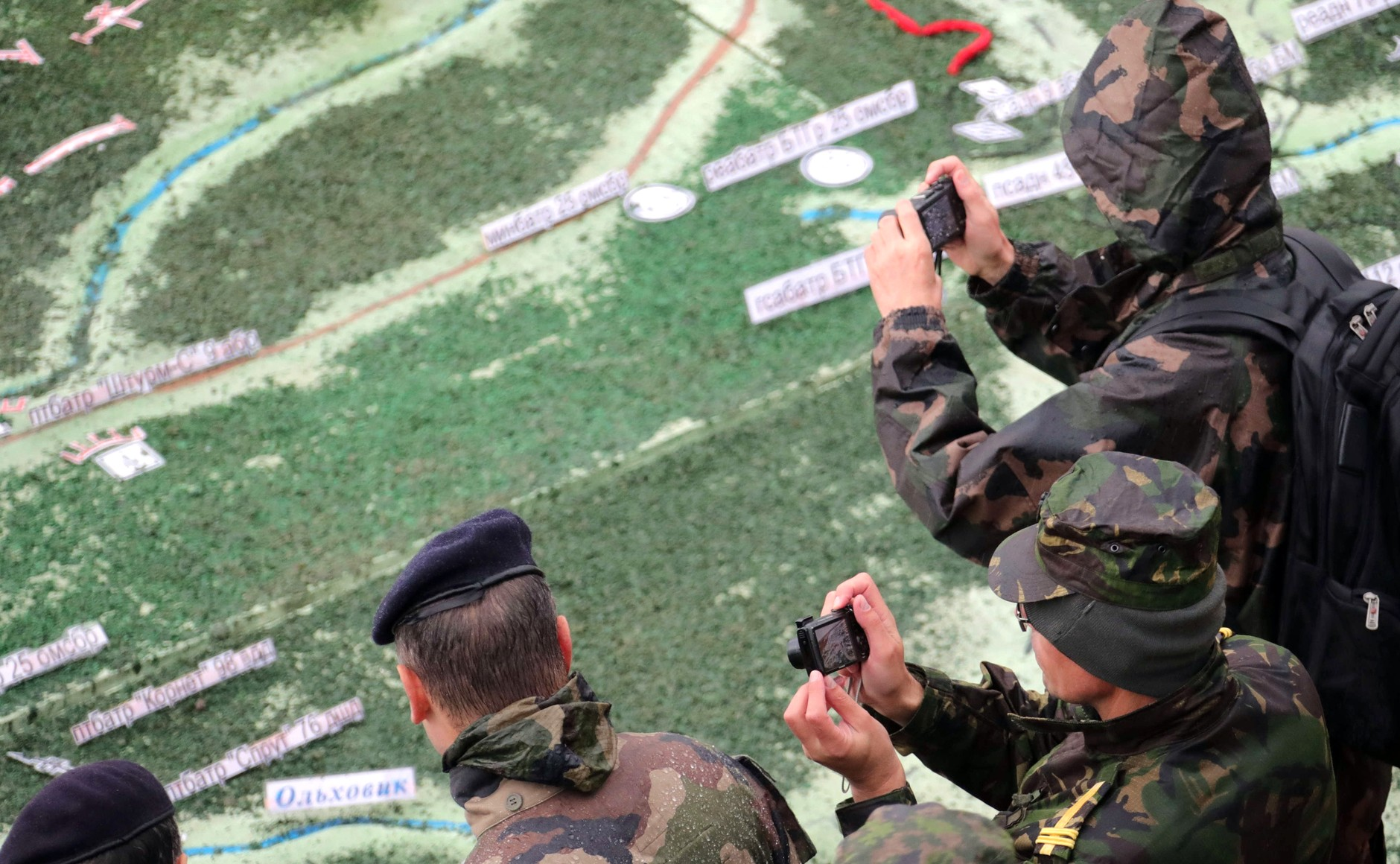
Foreign observers at the Luzhsky training ground, 18 September 2017

In the run-up to Zapad 2017, NATO and NATO member countries' officials sounded their concern and called on Russia to allow inspections of the drills for the purposes of transparency. In July and August 2017, a number of NATO countries' senior military officials such as U.S. general Raymond A. Thomas, commander of the United States Special Operations Command, Poland's Deputy Defence Minister Michał Dworczyk, and Ben Hodges, commanding general, United States Army Europe, expressed their suspicion that the maneuvers might be used as a pretext to increase Russia's military presence in Belarus and permanently deploy its troops there in a bid to counterbalance NATO's eastern reinforcement. On their part, Russia and Belarus maintained that Zapad 2017 was a scheduled event of strictly defensive nature, its scale being significantly smaller than NATO's analogous drills. Russian foreign minister Sergey Lavrov in June 2017 emphasised the significance of Russia and Belarus being in the Union State and dismissed any speculations about Russia's ulterior goals as nonsense.

On 20 June 2017, NATO Secretary General Jens Stoltenberg answering a question about the exercise said: "We are going to follow and monitor the Zapad exercise area here closely, and all nations have the right to exercise their forces but it is important that nations, be it Belarus or Russia, exercise their forces that they do that in accordance with well established guidelines and agreements and international obligations and we have something called the Vienna document which outlines how exercises have to be notified and be subject to international inspections and we call on Russia and also Belarus to do that in accordance with the Vienna document so that we have transparency, predictability related to Zapad 2017. We are also working in the framework of the NATO-Russia Council to have more transparency, predictability, connected to military posture but also exercises, and that is always important but especially important now when we see more military presence along our borders in this region. It's even more important to have transparency, international observation of exercises like Zapad."

In July 2017, the U.S. announced it would deploy a Patriot missile battery, helicopters and a National Guard tank company to Sweden (not a member of NATO) in September to join Sweden's largest military drills in some 30 years; the move was not officially billed as a response to Russia's concurrent Zapad. Also, as part of the U.S.-funded Operation Atlantic Resolve, the U.S. was planning to deploy some 600 paratroopers (the 173rd Airborne Brigade′s 1st Squadron, 91st Cavalry Regiment) to the Baltic countries to be positioned in Estonia, Lithuania, and Latvia for the duration of the Zapad 2017 exercise.

On 7 September, Germany's defence minister Ursula von der Leyen told reporters at EU defense ministers' meeting in Tallinn, Estonia: "It is undisputed that we are seeing a demonstration of capabilities and power of the Russians. Anyone who doubts that only has to look at the high numbers of participating forces in the Zapad exercise: more than one hundred thousand."

On 16 August 2017, the Ukrainian Defense Minister Stepan Poltorak told journalists: "We are monitoring the situation. We are aware of all the movements of Russian troops along our border. We realize which threats may arise, and we are going to adequately respond to both the existing threats and the threats posed by the war game." On 1 September, Chief of the General Staff of the Armed Forces of Ukraine Viktor Muzhenko said that "for the purposes of adequate reaction to external threats, in particular, those related to the Zapad 2017 exercise", Ukraine had modify the plan of its military training, namely it would conduct strategic command and control drills between 12 September and 15 September. In his annual address to parliament on 7 September 2017, Ukraine's president Petro Poroshenko, referring to Zapad 2017, said that there was "more and more evidence for [Russia's] preparations for an offensive war of continental proportions."

On the eve of the official kick-off of Zapad, Reuters cited a senior European security official as saying that Zapad would merge manoeuvres across Russia's western military districts in a "complex, multi-dimensional aggressive, anti-NATO exercise". NATO was said to have taken a low-key approach by running few exercises concurrent with Zapad, including an annual sniper exercise in Lithuania. However, Sweden's concurrent three-week Aurora 17 exercise (begun 11 September 2017) involved c. 19,000 troops, including c. 1,500 troops from the United States, France, Norway and other NATO states. The Swedish Armed Forces' High Command proposed that a direct telephone channel for preventing incidents in the Baltic region during the Zapad 2017 and Aurora 2017 exercises be established.

The Russian defence ministry announced that on 14 September 2017, NATO's Supreme Allied Commander Europe (SACEUR) General Curtis Scaparrotti initiated a telephone conversation with Russia's Chief of General Staff General Valery Gerasimov dedicated to the Zapad drills; the conversation was billed as a follow-up to the meeting of Valery Gerasimov and the Chairman of the NATO Military Committee Petr Pavel in Baku, Azerbaijan, earlier in September.

== Protests in Minsk prior to the drills ==
On 8 September 2017, in Minsk, Belarus, an unauthorised protest rally against the Zapad exercise took place, in which about 200 people took part. Among the slogans at the rally were: "Russia, go home!" and "This is our country, there will be no Russia here!". The Associated Press report on the rally noted: "Although police in the authoritarian former Soviet republic often harshly break up unsanctioned demonstrations, there were no arrests at [the] gathering." Russia's state-owned news agency RIA Novosti additionally reported on another, authorised rally in Minsk the same day, held by the opposition Belarusian Conservative Christian Party – BPF, at which anti-Zapad slogans were voiced as well.

== Preparatory drills and logistical preparations ==
According to the Russian defence ministry's statement, the practical preparation for Zapad 2017 began with command and control training in Moscow in March 2017.

On 7 August 2017, Russia's Northern Fleet, the most powerful of its four fleets, began special large-scale drills that were announced by Russian official media as a preparatory phase of the Zapad 2017 exercise; it was commanded directly by the commander-in-chief of the Russian Navy, Admiral Vladimir Korolev.

On 15 August 2017, Russia's military logistics units were announced to have started arriving in Belarus to make preparations for a joint special exercise scheduled for 21–25 August that involved military units and logistics support organizations of the two countries' armed forces as part of the preparation for Zapad 2017.

Officially billed by the Belarusian Defence Ministry as part of preparations for Zapad 2017, on 23–25 August 2017, Russia and Belarus carried out joint tactical aviation drills that involved redeployment of aircraft and helicopters of the Russian Aerospace Forces to Belarusian military airfields; among other things, landing on a motorway was practised.

On 12 September, the Belarus defence ministry announced that the aircraft from Russia's Western Military District had been re-deployed to Belarus' airfields for the exercise; the Russian pilots "were warmly and cordially welcomed on Belarusian soil" (in Machulishchy).

== The course of the exercise ==
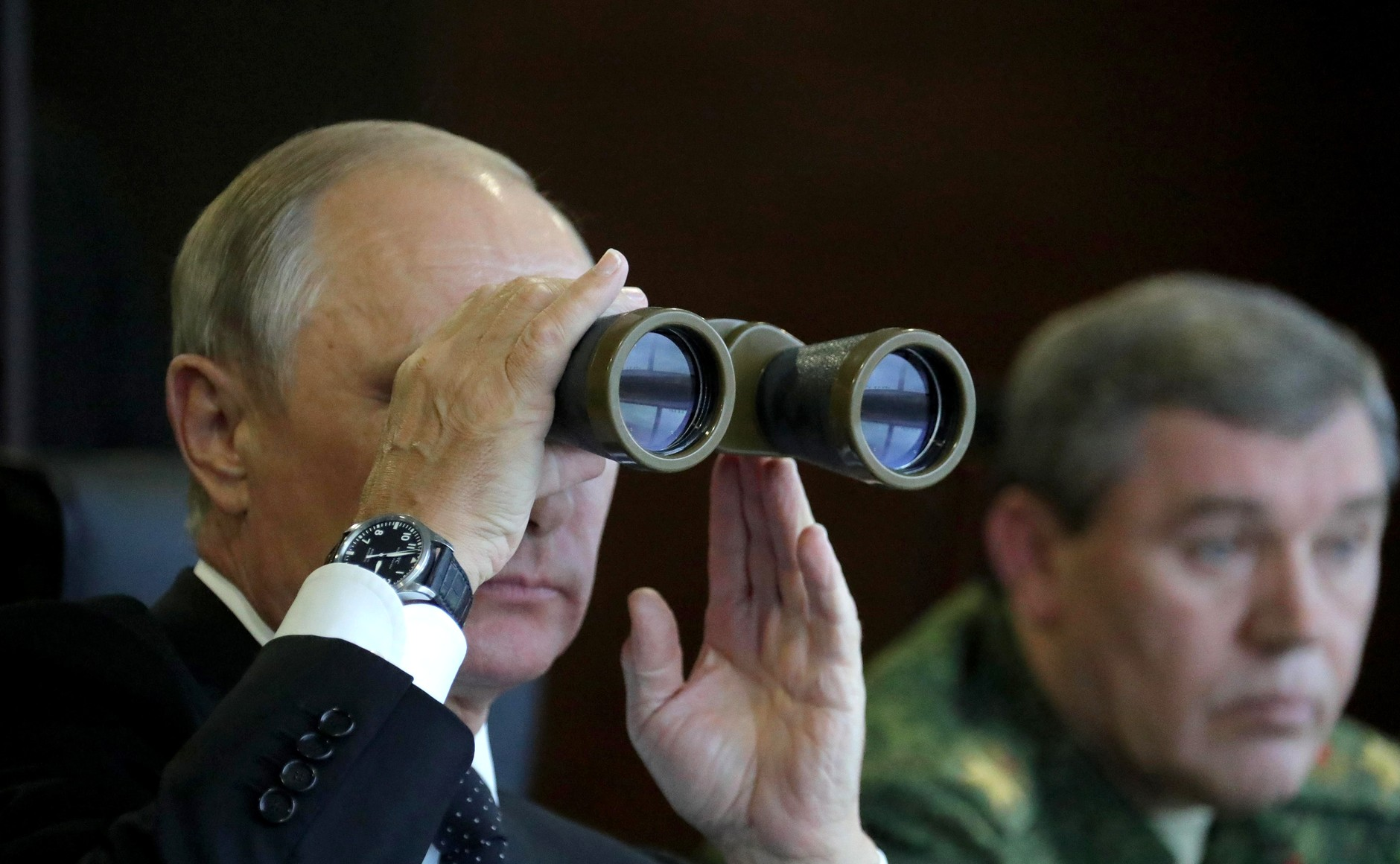
President Vladimir Putin and Chief of the General Staff Valery Gerasimov at Luzhsky range, 18 September 2017

On 14 September 2017, the Russian MoD announced that the Zapad 2017 exercise had begun on the territory of Russia and Belarus: at six ranges in Belarus (Lepelsky, Losvido, Borisovsky, Osipovichesky, Ruzhansky, Domanovsky and Dretun training area) and three ranges in Russia (Luzhsky, Strugi Krasnye and Pravdinsky). The ministry said that Russian military transport aircraft had started to airlift personnel and hardware to be involved in the exercise. Under the exercise's scenario, an information report stated that an illegal armed formation had been detected in a region of the Union State; the Western MD Command made a decision to alert personnel of the 1st Tank Army stationed in the Moscow region. The troops with materiel marched to the railway loading station to be redeployed to the exercise area in the Republic of Belarus.

On early morning 15 September, it was announced that the 6th Air Army′s Staff and several formations and units were being re-deployed to operational airfields for drills ″at combined-arms ranges and in the Baltic Sea water zone″.

On 16 September, it was announced by the Western Military District's press service that 20 ships and support vessels of the Russian Baltic Fleet had gone to sea to conduct tasks within the Zapad-2017 exercise such as anti-submarine and air defense, artillery firing on different types of targets. A wide range of activities took place in Belarus on that day. On the following day, the end of phase one of the drills was announced; the phase was analysed by experts as the defensive component of the exercise.

The details of phase two, the main stage of the exercise, were announced on 17 September. On 18 September, Russian president Vladimir Putin attended the exercise in the Leningrad Oblast. The following day, the mass media reported an incident that allegedly took place at the Luzhsky range, which was visited by Vladimir Putin, either on 17 or 18 September, in the course of which two people were hospitalized with injuries after a helicopter fired on bystanders; the incident was denied by the Russian defence ministry. Belarusian president Lukashenko's visit to Russia to attend the drills was said to have been cancelled, although this information was denied by officials of Belarus; president Lukashenko said that the original plan was for both presidents to attend the drills in Belarus but the plan had been altered due to the scale of the exercise. Lukashenko on 20 September visited the Borisovsky training area in Belarus and pronounced the exercise a success.

== Aftermath and analysis ==
On 19 September 2017, Poland's defense minister Antoni Macierewicz suggested that the Zapad 2017 exercise would stretch beyond 20 September and would involve a nuclear weapons component that was not officially announced.

On the final day of Zapad 2017, on 20 September 2017, Poland began a large national exercise, Dragon 17, in Zegrze north of Warsaw, with participation of some other NATO countries as well as Georgia and Ukraine; the drills that lasted until 29 September were presented by Russian media as Poland's and NATO's ″reply to Russia's Zapad 2017″ and were said to be significantly larger than Zapad 2017 in terms of troops and hardware involved.

On 28 September 2017, Ukraine's Commander-in-Chief (and Chief of the General Staff) Viktor Muzhenko told Reuters that Russia had left a significant part of its troops behind in Belarus after the exercise. The Russian MoD refuted the claim and said that Viktor Muzhenko's allegations "demonstrate[d] scale of degradation of the Ukrainian General Staff and incompetence of its chief".

Speaking in an interview in Brussels on 5 October, NATO Secretary-General Jens Stoltenberg said NATO was assessing whether Russia had pulled out all the troops it had sent to Belarus for the exercise and that "it [was] too early to make any final assessment" on the drill.

On 6 October 2017, Russian defence minister Sergey Shoygu said, ″The goals of the drills have been reached. I am drawing special attention to the fact that all means and forces involved were returned to their permanent bases"; he also noted, "Western media outlets were whipping up some very incredible and frightening scenarios of the exercises. At some point, some officials, among them certain state leaders, even called them a prelude to the seizure of foreign territories. All these lies were exposed right after the end of the exercises, which were purely defensive."

On 12 October 2017, the Russian defence ministry said that the United States had used the ″unprecedented hysteria″ fuelled by Western media around the Zapad 2017 exercise as cover to have illegally deployed the 2nd Armored Brigade Combat Team (the U.S. 1st Infantry Division) to Poland while the tanks (eighty-seven M1A1 Abrams tanks) and armoured vehicles of the 3rd Armored Brigade Combat Team (the 4th Infantry Division) had stayed in the region, despite the fact that the latter would have had to leave to comply with the 1997 NATO–Russia Founding Act on Mutual Relations, Cooperation and Security.

On 8 November 2017, NATO Secretary General Jens Stoltenberg said: ″ ... we have monitored and followed the Zapad exercise very closely, but we haven't seen that they have for instance left or remained with troops or equipment for instance in Belarus as we saw some speculations about before the exercise.″

On 22 November 2017, Russian president Vladimir Putin held a meeting with "the leadership of the MoD, defence industry complex, heads of ministries and regions", one in a series of his meetings with the leadership of the defence ministry and defence industry complex in Sochi at the end of November, at which the "results of the Zapad 2017 exercise were discussed" (according to the press service of the Kremlin) characterised by Putin as "the key event in the calendar of training"; in the part of his talk at the meeting that was made publicly available Putin stressed the importance of the ″civil aspects" thereof, namely the capacity of all types of big enterprises, including privately owned ones, to "quickly increase the volumes of defence products and services in the time of need." Putin's words were interpreted by Russian mainstream media as his order to industry ″to prepare for war″.

=== Analysis afterwards ===
Western preliminary expert analysis after the drills concluded that the initial estimates of the number of troops to be involved published by Western commentators proved to be wrong and Russia had ″kep[t] the drills small, managed, and contained″. Mathieu Boulègue of Chatham House wrote: ″The Kremlin could therefore credibly claim that the West overreacted and fell victim to scaremongering and reporting rumours that Moscow was not being transparent about the nature of the exercise and its intentions. Short of entrapment, proving the West wrong is increasingly part of the Kremlin's political strategy which, in turn, strengthens Russia's sense of superiority. < ... > It did not rehearse a total war scenario but rather showed it is ready to raise the cost of deterrence in order to win while also imposing a tremendous cost on an invading army. < ... > Zapad showed that any army seeking to burst Russia's A2/AD bubble would bear a high enough cost as to be effectively beaten.″

On 1 October 2017, The New York Times published a summary of the exercise emailed to them by the U.S. Defense Intelligence Agency: ″Russia's forces are becoming more mobile, more balanced and capable of conducting the full range of modern warfare.″

Professor Lamont Colucci argued that one of the three strategic objectives that, according to him, Russia had achieved through the Zapad drills was ″remind[ing] Belarus who was the boss in the region″. Brian Whitmore of Radio Liberty concluded: ″[W]hile the Kremlin saw Zapad as a big psy-op to intimidate Poland, the Baltic states, and Ukraine, Belarus wasn't interested in a conflict with the West. And Lukashenko appeared to go out of his way to rain on Putin's military parade. < ... > the Zapad exercises, which were supposed to illustrate strategic unity between Russia and Belarus amid Moscow's escalating conflict with the West, instead highlighted how troubled this partnership has become.″

Belarusian politician and dissent Andrej Sannikau argued that Zapad 2017 was intended to train the Russian and Belarusian military in putting down large scale civilian protests and unrest.

== See also ==
- Zapad Exercises
- Aurora 17 in Sweden, with a similar extent and time frame
- Cold War II
- Vostok 2018
