= Peace Mission 2005 =

Military exercise between China and Russia on the Shandong Peninsula

Peace Mission 2005 was the first ever joint military exercise between China and Russia. The exercise started on August 19, 2005, and consisted of combined land, sea, and air elements simulating an intervention in a state besieged by terrorists or political turmoil. It concluded on August 25, 2005. The force practiced air and naval blockades, an amphibious assault, and occupying a region. Approximately 8,200 Chinese troops took part along with 1,800 Russian troops. China initially wanted to hold the exercise near the Taiwan Strait, Russia wanted to hold the exercise in Northwestern China near central Asia, but instead settlement was made on the Shandong Peninsula.

There were a number of reasons why both countries sought to conduct a joint military exercise. These include, but are not limited to, the following:

- China was at the time the largest consumer of Russian military technology. The exercise was intended to showcase the latest Russian military capabilities, especially the Tupolev Tu-22M and Tupolev Tu-95 long range bombers.
- The two countries were also by far the most influential members in the Shanghai Cooperation Organisation; having a joint exercise demonstrated their leadership within the SCO, reaffirming their respective spheres of influence as well as to encourage a general strengthening of military ties.
- Both countries also sought to project their power outwardly; at the time the US, together with the UK and supported by other allies, were engaged militarily in Iraq and Afghanistan. While neither Russia nor China addressed these matters at the time, the exercise was widely regarded as a deliberate show of force against the United States, warning against any military engagement in either Russia's or China's respective spheres of interest; particularly as regards Ukraine, which at the time was seeking NATO membership, but also Georgia, and especially Taiwan.
- Some claim that the exercise was used as an opportunity to rehearse various scenarios for the aftermath of the death of Kim Jong Il (who did not die until 2011). One such scenario, it is suggested, included the collapse of the North Korean regime.

The stated reason for the exercise was counter-terrorism; however, many analysts agree that the use of such heavy firepower, including long-range bombers, has no practical relevance where the field and practice of counter-terrorism is concerned. Rather, the use of the term in this case demonstrates how easy it was for countries around the world to use the US's 'War on Terror' as a template to legitimise their own domestic or foreign policies. It provided an ideal blue print for nation-states to both grow militarily, but also to repress legitimate internal political dissent, all in the name of waging a war on terror.

== Observers ==
The war game was carried out by two senior members of SCO (China and Russia) and defense ministers of SCO member's invited to watch the exercises, so, it observed by Kazakhstan, Kyrgyzstan, Tajikistan, Uzbekistan, Iran, India and Pakistan as other members and observers of Shanghai Cooperation Organization.

== See also ==
- Exercise Zapad
- Vostok 2018
