= List of Kavkaz military exercises =

Kavkaz (Caucasus) is a series of Russian military exercises in the southern subjects of Russia in the area of Caucasus, including:

- Caucasus 2008 (Kavkaz 2008) was held from July 15, 2008, to August 2, 2008, immediately before the Russo-Georgian War, simultaneously with the U.S.-Georgian exercise Immediate Response 2008
- Caucasus 2009 (Kavkaz 2009), from June 29, 2009, to July 6, 2009
- Caucasus 2012 (Kavkaz 2012), September 17–23, 2012
- Caucasus 2016 (Kavkaz 2016), September 5–11, 2016. It was carried out in the Southern Military District; for the first time the training area included Crimea, which was included into the military district after the annexation of Crimea by Russia in 2014.
- Caucasus 2020 (Kavkaz 2020), September 21–26, 2020

== See also ==
- List of Zapad exercises
- List of Center exercises
- List of Vostok exercises
