= Zapad 1999 =

1999 Russian military exercise

Zapad-99 exercise (Russian: Запад-99, lit. 'West-99') was a large scale military exercise conducted in June 1999 and its results forced Russia to adapt a new defense concept.

The exercise simulated defense of Russian territory from NATO units, inspired by the recent demonstration of NATO capabilities in Yugoslavia. Politically, Russia wanted to demonstrate its strength to ensure that there would be no foreign intervention during its pacification in the Caucasus region (see Second Chechen War).

The exercise showed that conventional Russian armed forces could not repel a NATO offensive, this in turn increased the Russian tolerance for use of tactical nuclear weapons for "de-escalation".

Apart from nuclear controversy, Zapad-99 also sparked international tensions when US fighters intercepted Russian bombers allegedly in violation of Icelandic and Norwegian airspace.

The exercise begun on June 22, the date of the World War II German invasion of Russia.

== See also ==
- List of Zapad exercises
- Vostok 2018
- Zapad 2017
