= Zapad 2013 =

Russia and Belarus military exercise

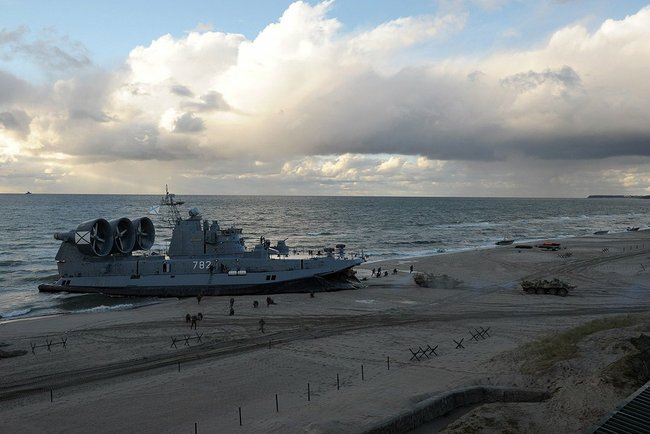
Zubr-class LCAC (landing craft) during Zapad-2013

The Zapad 2013 (Russian: Запад 2013, lit. 'West 2013') military exercise was held by the armed forces of Russia and Belarus in Russia and Belarus from 20 to 26 September 2013. The comprehensive exercise, involving all branches of the Russian military and between 10,000 and 90,000 soldiers (estimates vary), was officially described as counterterrorist, but international observers concluded it was a preparation for a conventional war.

== Exercise ==
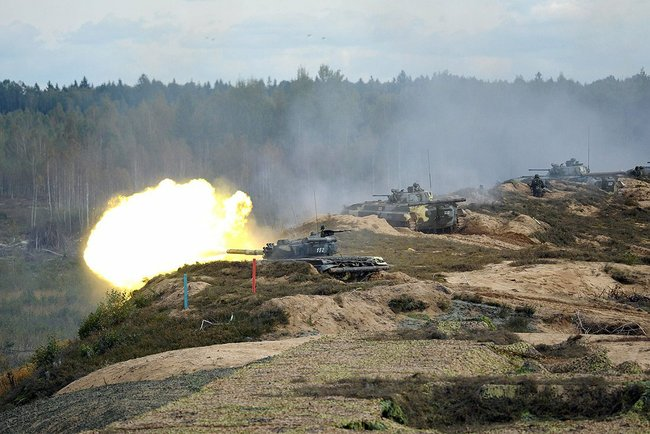
Firing T-72 tanks during Zapad 2013

Zapad 2013 took place from 20 to 26 September in several training grounds in the Russian Federation and Belarus, including in the Arctic (Barents Sea), in the Kaliningrad enclave on the Baltic Sea and on the sea itself, as well as near the cities of Moscow, St. Petersburg, Nizhniy Novgorod and Voronezh in central, western and southwestern Russia (Russian Western Military District). It involved all branches of Russia's armed forces, including special forces (Spetsnaz), with the singular exception of nuclear forces (which participated in Zapad 2009; however dual use Iskander missiles were launched during Zapad 2013). Official estimates for the number of troops participating were about 10,000; but international observers suggested it could have been as high as 60,000, 70,000 or 90,000 (Russia also conduced simultaneous Vzaimodeistiviye (“Mutual Action”) exercise with countries from the Collective Security Treaty Organization). Identified elements participating in the exercise included elements of the Russian Baltic Sea Fleet, the 6th and 20th Armies, as well as the 76th Guards Air Assault Division and the 31st Guards Air Assault Brigade. The exercises were supervised by Russian general Valery Gerasimov. Russian president Vladimir Putin and Belarusian president Alexander Lukashenko visited one of the training grounds where Zapad 2013 was taking place.

The exercise was officially described as having a counter-terrorism focus and aiming to test the Russian army command and control (C2) capabilities. Despite stated counter-terrorism focus with urban warfare elements, it also included training at repelling an amphibious invasion supported by naval and airborne elements, as well as anti-submarine warfare, electronic warfare, anti-aircraft warfare against bombers, and mobilization of reservists.

== Analysis ==
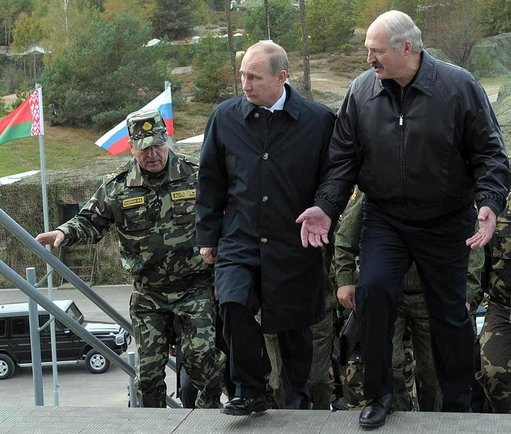
Putin and Lukashenko at the Gozhsky test ground during the final stage of the Zapad-2013

Several analysts presented their view on Zapad 2013 for the United States-based conservative defense think tank Jamestown Foundation. Stephen Blank noted that "Russian exercises are important because they reveal where, against whom and in what form Russia is preparing to wage war". He observed that the exercise showed some improvements in the Russian logistics, and also noted that their codename (Zapad, lit. West) may mislead foreign observers, as the exercise was very large in scale. Blank also pointed out that the "enemy forces", officially labelled as “Baltic terrorists” that invaded Belarus, were in fact representing NATO forces, and the exercise's real scope was not a preparation for counter-terrorism operations but for "a large-scale war against a conventional army". Pauli Järvenpää concurred with that assessment, noting that puzzlingly the exercise also included simulation of a conflict with the Finnish forces (at that time, not a part of NATO). Jörgen Elflying and Peter A. Mattsson noted that both Russian and international sources confirmed that Russian reforms to its C2 system still show need for further improvement. Ieva Bērziņa also agreed that there was an obvious mismatch between the official designation of the exercise as anti-terrorist and its large scale, concluding that it was a message of strategic deterrence to other countries (particularly NATO), as well as a reminder to the West that if Russia's wishes on the geopolitical arena are ignored, it is capable of enforcing them with force.

Giangiuseppe Pili and Fabrizio Minniti writing for the Royal United Services Institute argued that Zapad 2013 was Russian attempt to "integrate lessons learned from the 2008 war in Georgia", focusing on flexibility and joint operations, as well as the use of smaller units (brigades rather than divisions) following recent Russian military reforms.

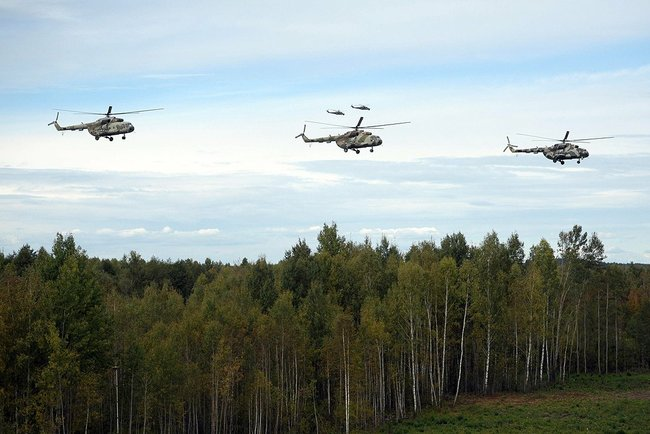
Helicopters in the Zapad-2013

Andrzej Wilk writing for the Centre for Eastern Studies called the exercise "anti-NATO" and noted that while it was a relatively regular event for the Russian army, it was the largest training activity for the Belarusian army in the last twenty years. He also suggested that one of the goals of Zapad 2013 was to create political fractures within NATO, by provoking politicians and media in NATO countries bordering Russia into making statements about Russian threat which would be dismissed as exaggerated by NATO members located further from Russia.

Anna Maria Dyner writing for the Polish Institute of International Affairs suggested that the exercise was partially inspired by the Arab Spring and involved contingency planning in case of a pro-democratic revolution in Belarus against Lukashenko, and aimed to discourage any foreign (non-Russian) intervention in such a conflict.

Belarusian politician and dissent Andrej Sannikau argued that Zapad 2013 was a preparation for the 2014 annexation of Crimea by the Russian Federation and War in Donbas.

== International response ==
Russia invited international observers and the official narrative stressed the transparent (as well as "peaceful" and "defensive") nature of the exercise. However, NATO observers were not invited. Some analysts also noted that the number and type of forces reported by Russia to OSCE were significantly undercounted and certainly exceeded OSCE-agreed limits (of 9,000 soldiers). The exercise caused concern in Poland, Baltic states and Scandinavia. Officials and media in those countries described the exercise as destabilizing and intimidating, and "not transparent", criticizing the official narrative of Zapad 2013 as anti-terrorism while in reality it simulated a conflict with NATO members. Russian officials and media personalities dismissed the concerns from its neighbors as "ridiculous", although shortly afterward Russian actions in Ukraine have been seen as reinforcing these concerns.

== See also ==
- List of Zapad exercises
