= Tsentr =

Tsentr, Russian for 'center', may refer to:

- Center (band)
- Center exercises, a series of Russian military exercises
- TV Centre (Russia)
