= Zapad-81 =

1981 Soviet military exercise

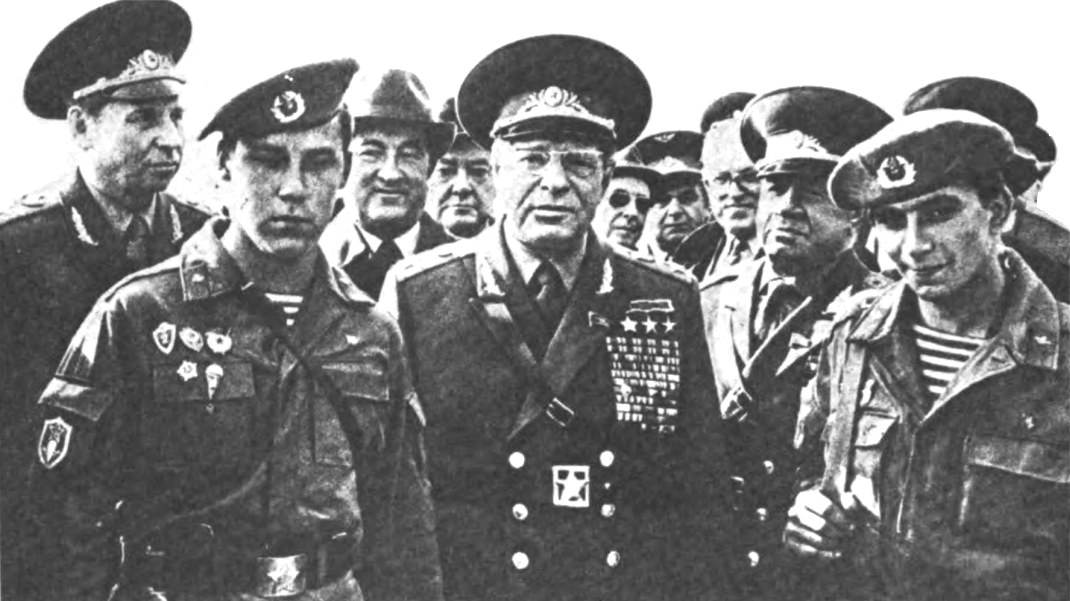
Left to Right: Marshals Nikolai Ogarkov, Dmitry Ustinov, and General Alexei Yepishev pose with paratroopers during exercise Zapad-81.

Zapad-81 (Russian: Запад-81, lit. 'West-81') was a large military exercise carried out by the Soviet Union, according to NATO and US sources. It was conducted from 4 September 1981 and lasted approximately eight days, it involved between 100,000 and 150,000 troops. It was a joint operation including elements from all Soviet service branches and introduced several new systems such as the RSD-10 medium-range strategic missile (known often to the West as the SS-20 Saber) and the Project 1143 aircraft carrier Kiev.

== History ==
The exercise was first and foremost a show of force. Propaganda tapes were made of the large scale offensives concluding in a large victory parade. Apart from being a show of force to the NATO countries, the exercise was a large-scale demonstration of military capability in Poland. After failed reforms, communism in the People's Republic of Poland during the seventies was in a state of crisis and civil unrest (Solidarność). Exercise Zapad included amphibious landings in Poland near Gdańsk, reminding Poles that the Soviet Union could resort to military force if it was deemed necessary for the preservation of communist power.

The exercise was criticised by the US for violating the Helsinki Final Act of notification of military exercises.

== See also ==
- List of Zapad exercises
- Zapad 2021 exercise
- Vostok 2018
- North China Military Exercise
