= Zapad 2009 =

2009 military exercise involving Belarus and Russia

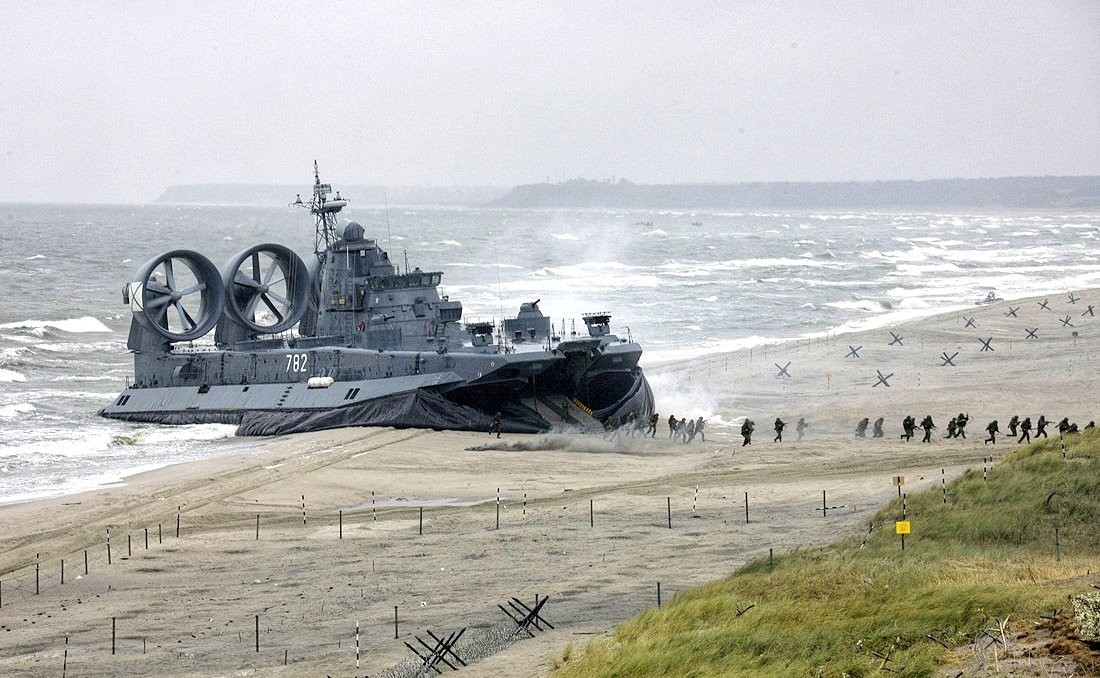
Mordovia 782, a Zubr-class hovercraft, deploying marines during Zapad-09

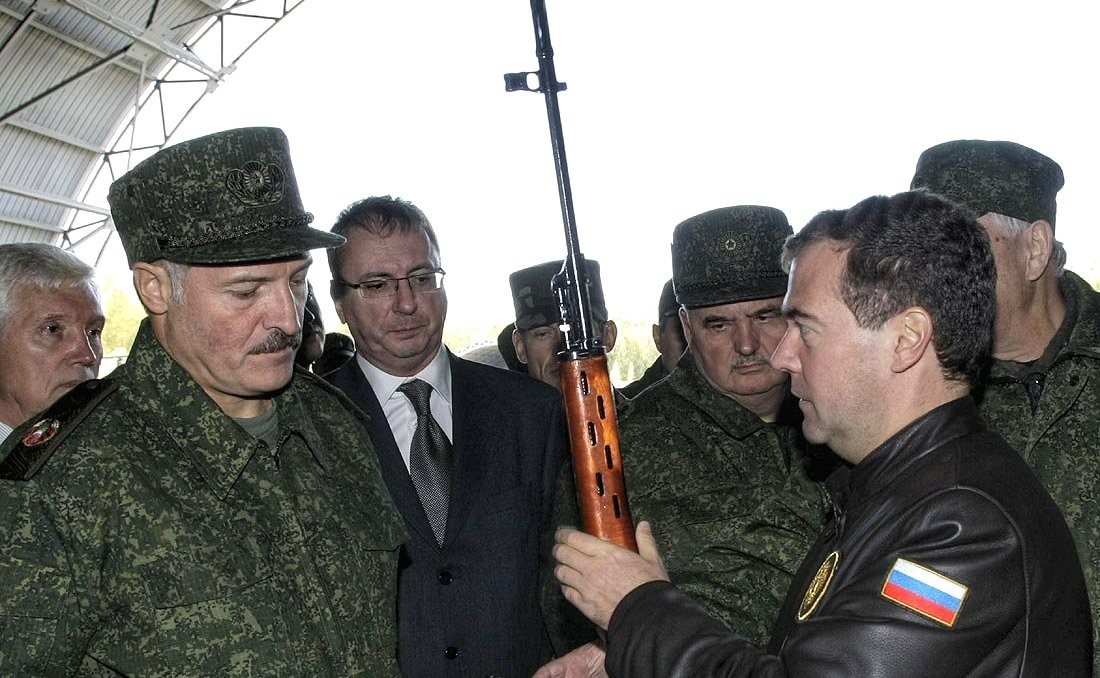
President of Russia Dmitry Medvedev and Belarusian President Alexander Lukashenko observing the final phase of the Zapad-2009 strategic exercises that took place in Baranavichy, Belarus.

The Zapad 2009 (Russian: Запад 2009, lit. 'West 2009') military exercise was held by the armed forces of Russia and Belarus in Belarus from 8–29 September 2009. According to several reports and analyses, the exercise could have involved training for the use of nuclear weapons, and might have simulated a nuclear strike on a NATO country (most likely Poland).

== Exercise ==
The Zapad 2009 exercise was the first in the post-Cold War era series of Zapad exercises that begun after Russia and Belarus signed an agreement to conduct recurring joint military exercises. It took place in Belarus, near the Belarus-Lithuania and Belarus–Poland border and the towns of Brest and Grodno. They also had a naval component at the Baltic Sea. Estimates of the troops involved vary: official estimates stated 13,000 troops; Centre for Eastern Studies estimated about 15,000 troops (6,500 Belarusian and 8,500 Russian) while NATO estimated that it involved 7,000 Belarusian troops and 11,000 Russian troops. The exercise involved both land, air and naval units.

Claimed as a practice of counter-terrorism and defensive operations centered on the suppression of an uprising by a Polish minority in Belarus and defending a gas pipeline (Nord Stream) against attacks from Poland and Lithuania; it also simulated an amphibious landing in Poland. Most controversially, according to several analyses it also simulated a nuclear attack against Poland (striking Warsaw). Some analysts described the exercise as "repelling a NATO attack on Belarus" followed by an escalation into "limited nuclear strikes when conventional weapons failed". Others drew more cautiously worded conclusions, noting that the exercise involved nuclear-capable ballistic missiles (Iskander), but not necessarily a simulation of a nuclear attack on another country.

In landing exercise there took part large landing ships Kaliningrad and Minsk from the Baltic Fleet, strengthened by Azov, Yamal, Nowocherkassk, Georgiy Pobedonosets and Aleksandr Otrakovskiy from the Black Sea and Northern Fleets/

== Analysis and international reactions ==
NATO described the exercises as "provocative and inappropriate" and "the largest Russia has held since the Soviet era". The largest exercise claim relates to Zapad 2009 being held together with another Russian military exercise, Ladoga-2009, in the Leningrad Military District. Centre for Eastern Studies estimated that about 30,000 troops took part in both exercises and noted it was the largest exercise the Soviet Union held its Western border since the end of the Cold War.

Several analysts suggested that the exercise was a demonstration of power, particularly aimed at intimidating Poland, which at that time was considering closer cooperation with the United States on the issue of European missile defense. The exercises have been described as having "caused an outrage" in Poland due to the simulated practicing landing on the Polish coast as well as nuclear strike on Poland. The timing of the exercise was also seen as symbolic, given that they took place during the 70th anniversary of the Soviet invasion Poland (of 17 September 1939). Similarly, Ladoga-2009 has drawn comparisons to the Red Army’s preparation for the invasion of the Baltic States, and its invasion of Finland in 1939. The very name of the exercise references Soviet-era exercises of the same name (e.g. Zapad-81), and official statements and activities included numerous glorification of Russia's Soviet past, including an event where World War II veterans were invited to observe the exercise. Such rhetoric has been described as controversial for many countries in Central and Eastern Europe that have been formerly under Soviet sphere of influence.

The exercises have also been interpreted as evidence of improving conditions of the Russian Army, and deepening Russian influence in and control over Belarus.

Both Zapad 2009 and Vostok 2010 (East 2010) exercises involved the simulation of nuclear strikes on enemy forces to de-escalate a conflict; a strategy that Olga Oliker suggests may have been a test for a lowering of the nuclear threshold which was not, in the end, adopted, although others have argued it forms part of modern Russian military planning and political rhetoric.

During the exercise, several incidents of Russian air units approaching the air space of its neighbors (Lithuania and Finland) occurred.

== See also ==
- List of Zapad exercises
