= Caucasus 2009 =

Military exercise of the Russian armed forces

Caucasus 2009 (also called Kavkaz 2009) was an operational-strategic military exercise of the Russian armed forces which took place from 29 June to 6 July 2009. It was conducted in 10 southern subjects of the Russian Federation.

== Background ==
The main purpose of the exercise was to assess combat readiness in the Southwest district of Russia and to improve interaction of military administrations in the North Caucasus. The exercises were structured around a theoretical crisis situation that spirals out of control into open fighting.

The Russian General Staff officials claimed the drill should help "stabilise the situation in South Russia" and "prevent Georgia's possible military actions against Abkhazia and South Ossetia". "The incumbent Georgian leadership has not given up new military adventures with regard to Abkhazia and South Ossetia or attempts to resolve the territorial issue by armed force," the Interfax news agency quoted the source as saying. According to Deputy Defence Minister Col. Gen. Alexander Kolmakov the exercises were adjusted as a result of the recent NATO war games that were held from 6 May to 3 June in Georgia.

Georgia and Russia fought a brief war in August 2008 when Georgia launched a military operation against South Ossetia, a de facto independent region that was backed by Russia. President Medvedev sent in troops to drive Georgian forces out of the region and invaded Georgia Proper, the base of the Georgian Army.

== Reactions ==
Georgia denounced the drills as "dangerous provocation". Georgia’s Deputy Foreign Minister, Alexander Nalbandov, said that "holding of such maneuvers against the background of explosive situation will only contribute to further tensions".

According to a Western military attaché in Tbilisi, interviewed by the International Crisis Group researchers, Russia's decision to use several sites in Abkhazia and South Ossetia, during the drills "could further stoke tensions."

== Participating units ==
The participating units were mainly from the North Caucasus Military District, South Ossetia and Abkhazia, as well as units of the Black Sea Fleet, the Caspian Flotilla, the Air Force and the Airborne Troops, a total of 8,500 troops, about 200 tanks, 450 armored vehicles, and up to 250 artillery pieces took part in the exercises.

The exercises were personally overseen by the chief of Russia's General Staff, General Nikolay Yegorovich Makarov,

== Location ==
The exercise was held in the Krasnodar and Stavropol Territories, the Astrakhan, Volgograd and Rostov Regions, the Republics of North Ossetia – Alania, Ingushetia and Dagestan, as well as the Karachayevo-Cherkess and Chechen Republics.

== See also ==
- List of Kavkaz military exercises
