= Caucasus 2008 =

2008 military exercise in Russia

Caucasus 2008 were large-scale military maneuvers conducted by Russia in July 2008 close to its border with Georgia. The main forces involved were from the 58th Army from the North Caucasus Military District, and the Black Sea Fleet. The exercises were almost concurrent to joint US–Georgian military exercises dubbed Immediate Response 2008. At the time, Russia's stated objective for Caucasus 2008 was to improve combat skills in fighting terrorism in mountainous terrain, Russian tanks subsequently entered Georgia in August, starting the Russo-Georgian War.

They were held in several regions of the Southern Federal District, including Chechnya, North Ossetia, Ingushetia, Kabardino-Balkaria, and Karachay–Cherkessia. The units involved were from the North Caucasus Military District, mainly the 58th Army, the 4th Air Force Army, Interior Ministry troops, and border guards. Airborne troops involved included the 56th Airborne Assault Regiment, which conducted parachute assault exercises. There was also a naval element, involving ships from Russia's Black Sea Fleet and the Novorossiysk Naval Base.

Russia sought to minimise the true scale of Caucasus 2008, claiming that it involved 8,000 military personnel, 700 tanks and armored personnel carriers, and 30 aircraft; in fact, the actual numbers were significantly larger. Following the maneuvers, the forces remained in place and were expanded to 80,000 personnel, of which 60,000 later took part in war operations.

== See also ==
- List of Kavkaz military exercises
