= Aurora 17 =

Military exercise

Countries participating in Aurora 17

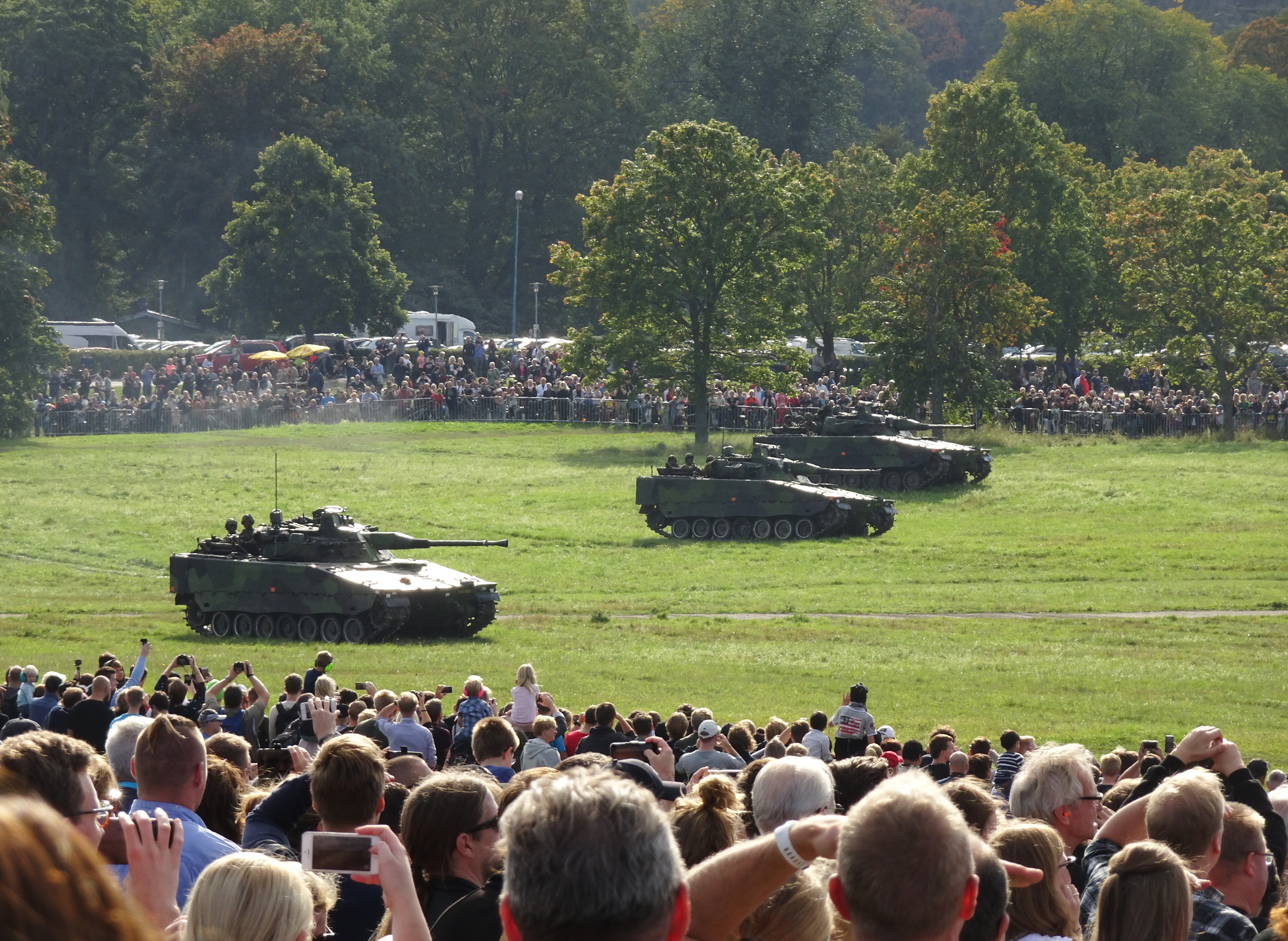
Aurora 17 in Stockholm

Aurora 17 was a military exercise that took place in Sweden during a three-week period, from 11 through 29 September 2017. Its main focus was the defence of Gotland. It was Sweden’s biggest military exercise in 23 years and involved troops from the United States and some other NATO countries. Major general Bengt Andersson served as its exercise director.

== Events and opinions ==
Around 21,150 total personnel from all branches of the Swedish Armed Forces, as well as troops from foreign nations participated. One fourth of them consisted of Home Guardsmen. Civilian authorities, such as police and social services also participated. Finland (Which was not a NATO member at the time) and several NATO nations took part in the exercise. The participating nations included France, Denmark, Estonia, Latvia, Lithuania, Norway, Germany, and the United States. The designated exercise area covered most of Sweden, but was focused on the Mälaren Valley, Stockholm, Gotland and Gothenburg.

The exercise is expected to cost the Swedish government 583 million Swedish kronor (approx. $65.6 million USD). The Economist put the cost at $73 million.

On 13 September 2017, Sweden′s defence minister Peter Hultqvist said, "The exercise sends an important signal about our security policy. It raises the deterrent threshold against different types of incidents.” He cited the “deterioration of the security situation in Europe” as the reason for the exercise. The Economist claimed the exercise was aimed at sending a signal to Russia.

== See also ==
- Zapad 2017 exercise within a similar time frame
