= Center 2026 =

Russian military exercise

- Type: Strategic command and staff exercise
- Location: Central Military District (ten training grounds), Caspian Sea
- Planned by: Russian Ministry of Defence
- Date: 28 September 2026 – 3 October 2026
- Executed by: Russia; Belarus; China; Kyrgyzstan; Mongolia; Pakistan; Tajikistan

Center 2026 (Russian: Центр-2026, Tsentr 2026) was a military exercise in Russia during 28 September – 3 October 2026. Full name: Стратегическое командно-штабное учение «Центр-2026», 'Strategic Command and Staff Exercise "Tsentr-2026"'. Training exercises were carried out in the Central Asian strategic direction and in the Caspian Sea. They involved over 47,000 personnel, including personnel from 7 other countries, with the presence of observers from 51 countries. It is carried out in sync with the "Interaction-2026" exercise by the Collective Security Treaty Organization.

The exercise involved the militaries of Russia, Tajikistan, Mongolia, Belarus, China, Pakistan and Kyrgyzstan and was held at ten training grounds, as well as in the waters of the Caspian Sea. with the main action happening on October 2, at the Chebarkul training ground of the Central Military District by Chebarkul in Chelyabinsk Oblast.

== See also ==
- List of Center exercises
