= Vostok 2010 =

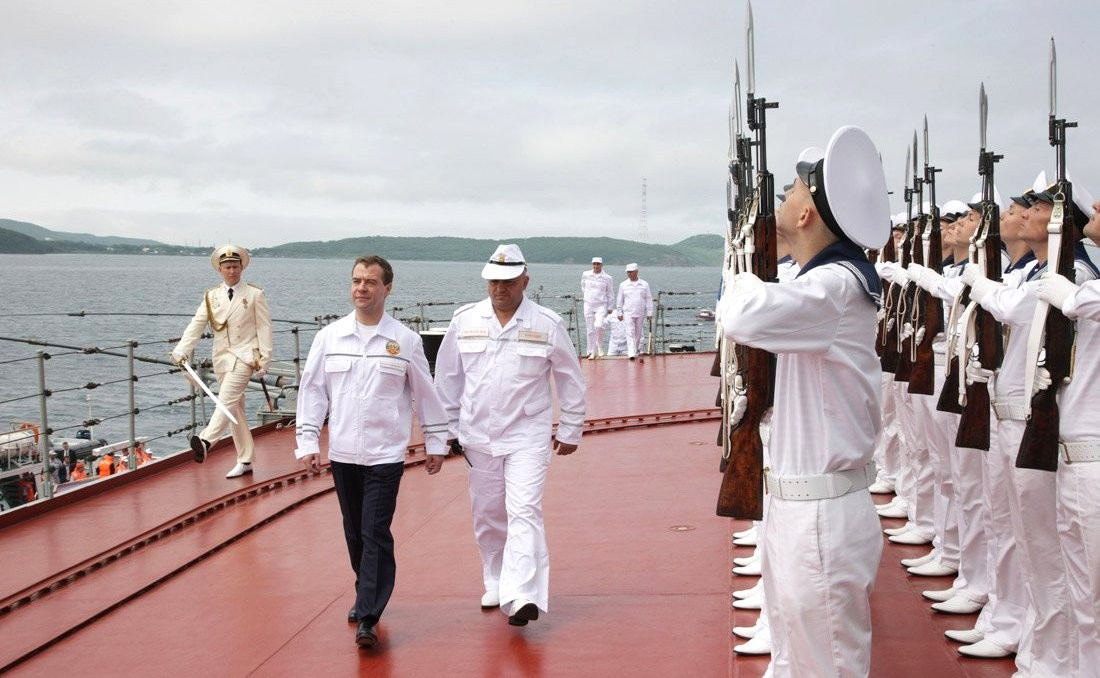

Vostok 2010 (Russian: Восток 2010, lit. 'East 2010') was a large-scale Russian military exercise held in Siberia and the country's Far East from June 29 to July 8, 2010. The drill involved at least 20,000 troops, up to 70 warplanes and 30 warships.

== History ==
For the first time in Russia's modern history the military exercises involved the warships of three Russian fleets — the Black Sea Fleet, Pacific Fleet and Northern Fleets. Another first was the redeployment of Sukhoi Su-24M frontline bombers and Su-34 multi-role fighters from bases in the European part of Russia 8,000 km away in non-stop flights with two in-flight refuellings. The exercise also marked the first time mechanised infantry airlifted from the Ural Mountains used heavy weapons stored at reserve depots established near the Chinese border.

Colonel-General Nikolay Yegorovich Makarov, chief of the General Staff of the Russian Armed Forces, said that Vostok-2010 would include the firing of live ammunition, simulated airborne assaults and amphibious assault landings. According to the general, the Far East was chosen for its broad expanses, limited infrastructure, and challenging weather and climate. The flagships of the Northern Fleet and the Black Sea Fleet participated in the naval exercises conducted in the Sea of Japan. Russian President Dmitry Medvedev observed the naval exercises of Russia's Pacific fleet while on board the nuclear-powered missile cruiser Pyotr Velikiy (Peter The Great) in the Sea of Japan near Vladivostok, Russia on July 4, 2010.

It has been suggested that both Zapad 2009 and Vostok 2010 (East 2010) exercises involved the simulation of nuclear strikes on enemy forces to de-escalate a conflict; a strategy that has been described few years later as obsolete or abandoned by the Russian forces.

== See also ==
- Vostok 2018
