= Zapad 2021 =

2021 joint military exercise by Russia and Belarus

- Part of the Russo-Ukrainian war
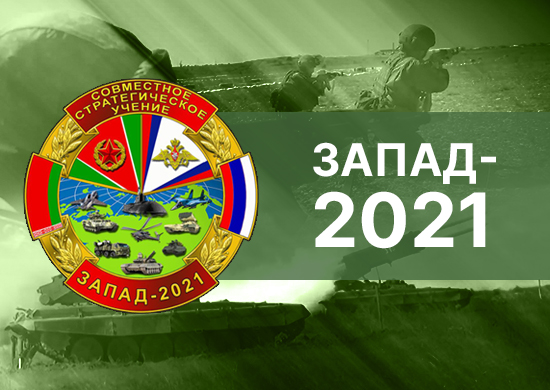
- Zapad 2021
- Date: September 10–15, 2021
- Location: Belarus: 230th combined arms training ground "Obuz-Lesnovsky"; 174th training ground of the Air Force and Air Defense forces "Domanovsky"; 210th aviation training ground "Ruzhansky"; Brest training ground; Russia: Kirillovsky; Strugi Krasnye; Mulino; Pogonovo; Khmelevka; Pravdinsky; Dobrovolsky; Dorogobuzh; Volsky training grounds

Number
200,000	

Zapad 2021 (Russian: Запад-2021, English: West 2021) was a joint strategic exercise between the armed forces of the Russian Federation and Belarus, which took place from 10 to 15 September 2021. According to the Ministry of Defence of the Russian Federation, approximately 200,000 military personnel, up to 760 pieces of equipment, and 15 ships participated in the exercises.

According to American chairman of the Joint Chiefs of Staff Mark Milley, it was indicative of the imminence of the invasion of Ukraine.

== General information ==
Strategic exercises between Belarus and Russia are held every two years, as per an agreement reached between Russian President Dmitry Medvedev and Belarusian President Alexander Lukashenko in 2009. In 2021, they were combined with maneuvers of the Collective Rapid Reaction Forces of the CSTO member states.

According to First Deputy Minister of Defense of the Republic of Belarus, Major General Viktor Gulevich, "Zapad-2021 is purely defensive, and its holding does not pose any threat, either to the European community as a whole or to neighboring countries in particular. Zapad-2021 is planned and is the final stage in the system of joint training of the armed forces of Belarus and Russia this year. Its primary objective is to enhance the preparedness of troops from the regional grouping tasked with ensuring security in the Eastern European region."

On September 1, the stage planned by the General Staff to enhance the country's defense capability was completed: a reserve army of 38,000 combat troops was established in the Southern Military District.

=== Location of the exercise ===
Exercises were conducted on Belarusian territory at the 230th combined arms training ground "Obuz-Lesnovsky", the 174th training ground of the Air Force and Air Defense forces "Domanovsky", the 210th aviation training ground "Ruzhansky", and the Brest training ground, as well as 9 Russian training grounds (Kirillovsky, Strugi Krasnye, Mulino, Pogonovo, Khmelevka, Pravdinsky, Dobrovolsky, Dorogobuzh, Volsky).

=== Number of forces and equipment ===
Up to 760 armored vehicles, including around 290 tanks, 240 artillery, and MLRS units, as well as over 80 aircraft and helicopters, participated in the exercises.

For the first time, a fully robotic group of combined arms units participated in the exercises in combat formations, which included robots such as "Uran-9", "Nerekhta", and others. They were supported by a laser system designed to blind the sights of tanks, artillery systems, and sniper rifles.

Additionally, 400 Belarusian servicemen and over 30 pieces of military equipment went to Russia. The Ministry of Defense of the Republic of Belarus announced that all troops and equipment would return to their permanent locations after the exercises.

== Progress of the exercises ==
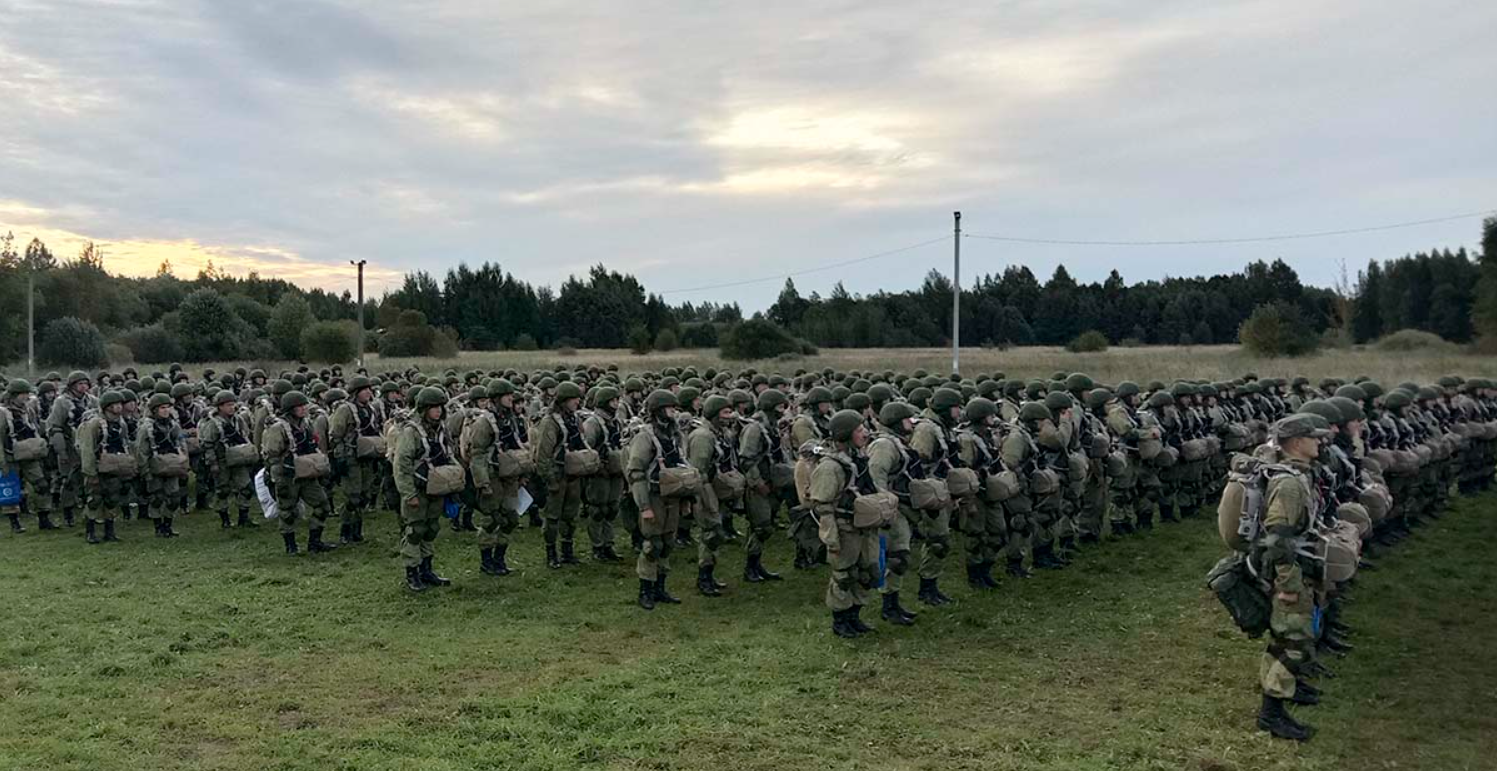
Russian paratroopers prepare to board transport aircraft during the West-2021 military exercises.

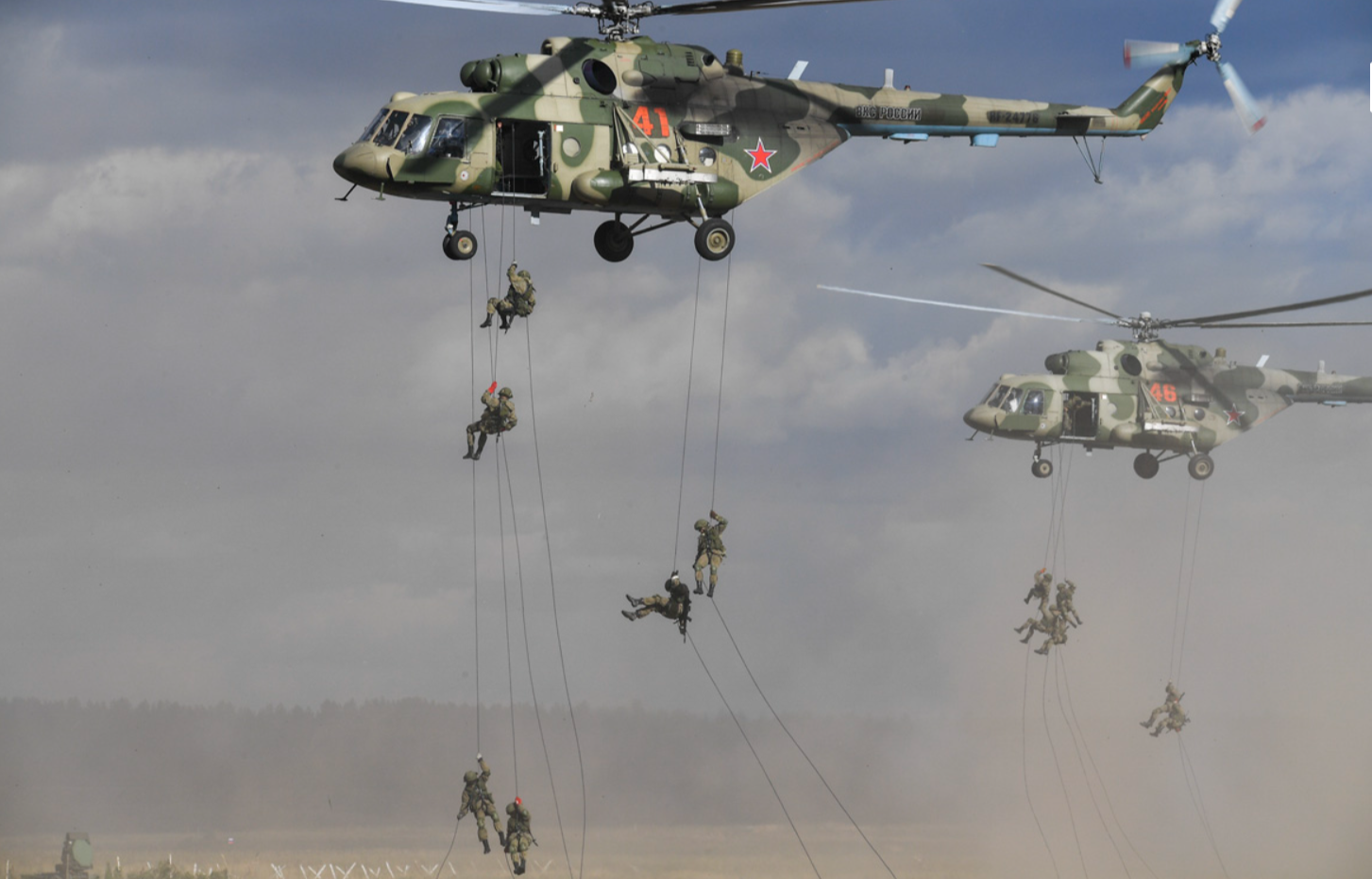
Touchdown at the Mulino training ground during the West 2021 exercise.

The exercises commenced on 10 September, involving 200,000 military personnel, 760 units of military equipment (including over 80 aircraft and helicopters, more than 290 tanks, 240 guns, multiple rocket launchers, and mortars), and 15 ships. They commenced simultaneously at 14 military ranges: Kirilovsky, Strugi Krasnye, Mulino, Pogonovo, Khmelevka, Pravdinsky, Dobrovolsky, Dorogobuzh, and Volsky, located on the territory of the Russian Federation, in the Baltic Sea, as well as at five ranges in the Republic of Belarus — Obuz-Lesnovsky, Brest, Chepelevo, Domanovsky, and Ruzhansky. The opening of the exercises took place in Mulino near Nizhny Novgorod.

The tactical concept of the Zapad-2021 exercises was standard: repelling the enemy's attack, drawing the enemy in, encircling, destroying, and going on the offensive.

The defending units were supported by 12 divisions (140 guns) of modernized self-propelled howitzers "Msta-S" (providing the so-called "Fire Shaft").

At the training grounds in the Kaliningrad Oblast, the military practiced actions to eliminate conditional illegal armed formations in urban conditions, as well as strikes against stationary and mobile targets. For the first time, the Platform-M ground-based robotic complexes were used there - robots armed with grenade launchers and a Kalashnikov assault rifle were successfully utilized by motorized infantry and paratroopers who controlled the process remotely.

T-72B3 tanks, equipped with additional dynamic protection and anti-mine trawls, along with the Terminator BMPT, played a significant role in the ground force offensive. A platoon of the latest B-19 infantry fighting vehicles, fitted with the Epoch combat module, entered combat. Additionally, the heavy flamethrower systems TOS-1A "Solntsepek" collaborated for the first time with the latest remote mining complexes "Agriculture."

For the first time, engineering, surveillance, and strike robots played a significant role in the combat training of troops, alongside tanks and other ground and aviation equipment. The most notable were the Uran family machines, which directly engaged in battle formations with defending units and provided cover for the forces during position changes by motorized rifle units. Additionally, the Nerekhta robots were utilized for reconnaissance and fire support.

For the first time, reconnaissance and strike UAVs were extensively deployed for operational purposes, providing cover for the maneuvering actions of defending units. They operated alongside the Sagittarius intelligence and communications complex.

Simultaneously, various groups of army aviation were engaged: Su-35S, Su-30SM, MiG-31BM, and Su-34 fighters provided air cover for the troop grouping. Helicopters, including variously modified Mi-8s, reconnaissance and strike Mi-28 "Night Hunter," attack Ka-52 "Alligator," and Mi-35s, operated at the forefront of the counteroffensive. They conducted tactical troop landings and transported equipment and weapons externally. Additionally, four squadrons of Su-34S fighter-bombers targeted key enemy defense installations.

The official "closing" ceremony took place on 15 September at the Mulino training ground in Nizhny Novgorod.

== Analysis and aftermath ==
International media and observers concluded that the activity represented training in preparation for a conflict with other European, probably NATO-aligned countries; the "fictional" enemies of the Russian and Belarusian units included forces from "Neris (a Lithuanian river), Pomoria and Polar Republic", which according to the exercise fomented domestic unrest in Belarus and then proceeded to invade it, leading to a Belarusian-Russian counterattack.

According to American General and Chairman of the Joint Chiefs of Staff Mark Milley, observations of Zapad 2021 helped the American intelligence community predict that the Russian invasion of Ukraine was imminent. This was because the exercise was much greater in scale, scope, composition, and duration than previous exercises. Following the exercise, Milley held a briefing with American President Joe Biden about the severity of the Russian threat towards Ukraine. Milley held a meeting with Chief of General Staff of the Russian Armed Forces, Valery Gerasimov, in Finland, on September 22, 2021, to de-escalate tensions in Europe.

== See also ==
- List of Zapad exercises
