= Vostok 2018 =

2018 Russian military exercise

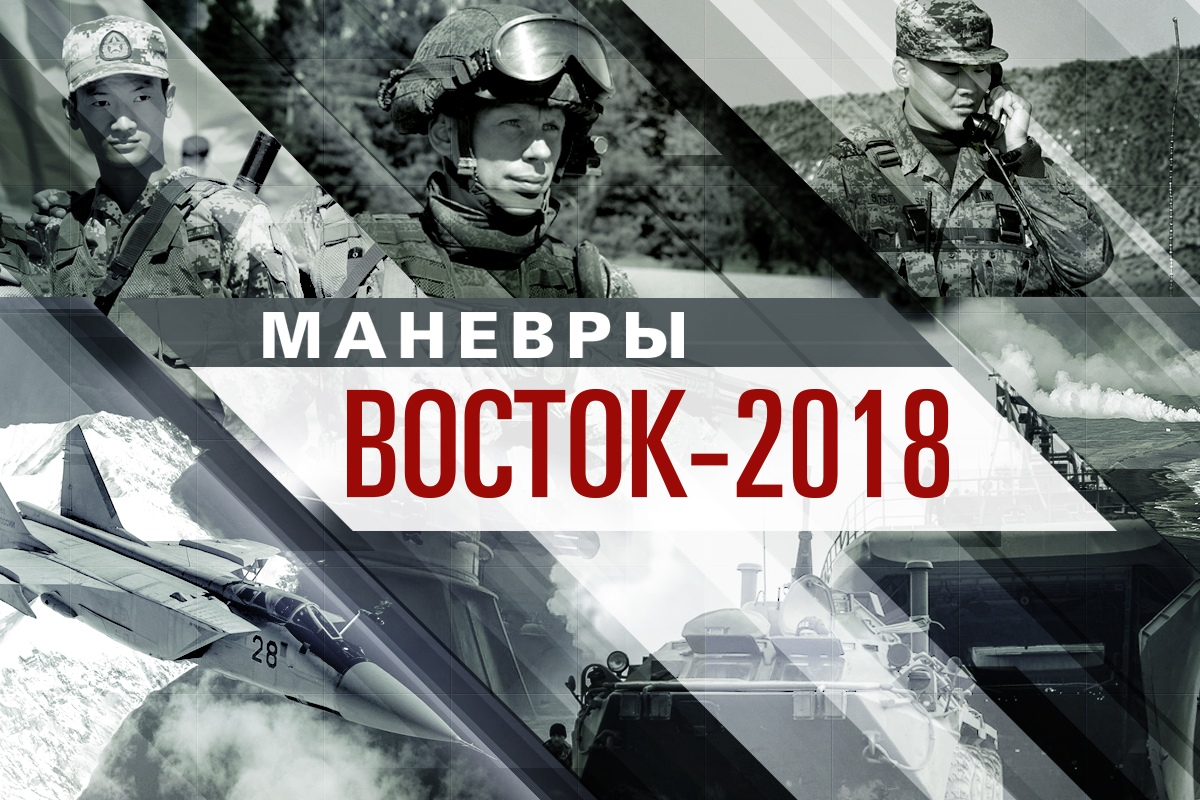
The Russian MoD's collage for the Vostok 2018 exercise

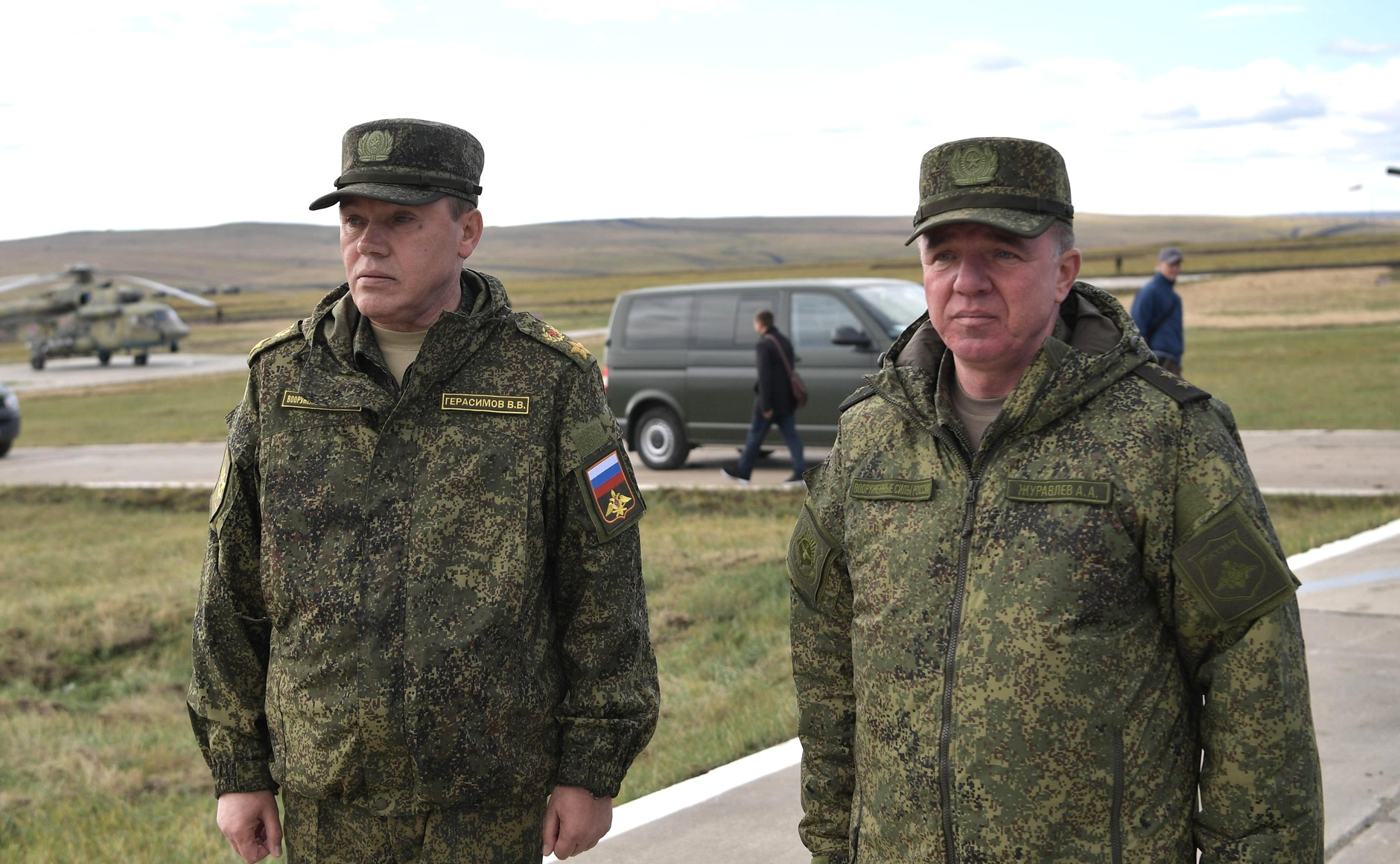
Chief of the General Staff Army General Valery Gerasimov with Eastern Military District commander Colonel General Alexander Zhuravlyov at the exercise

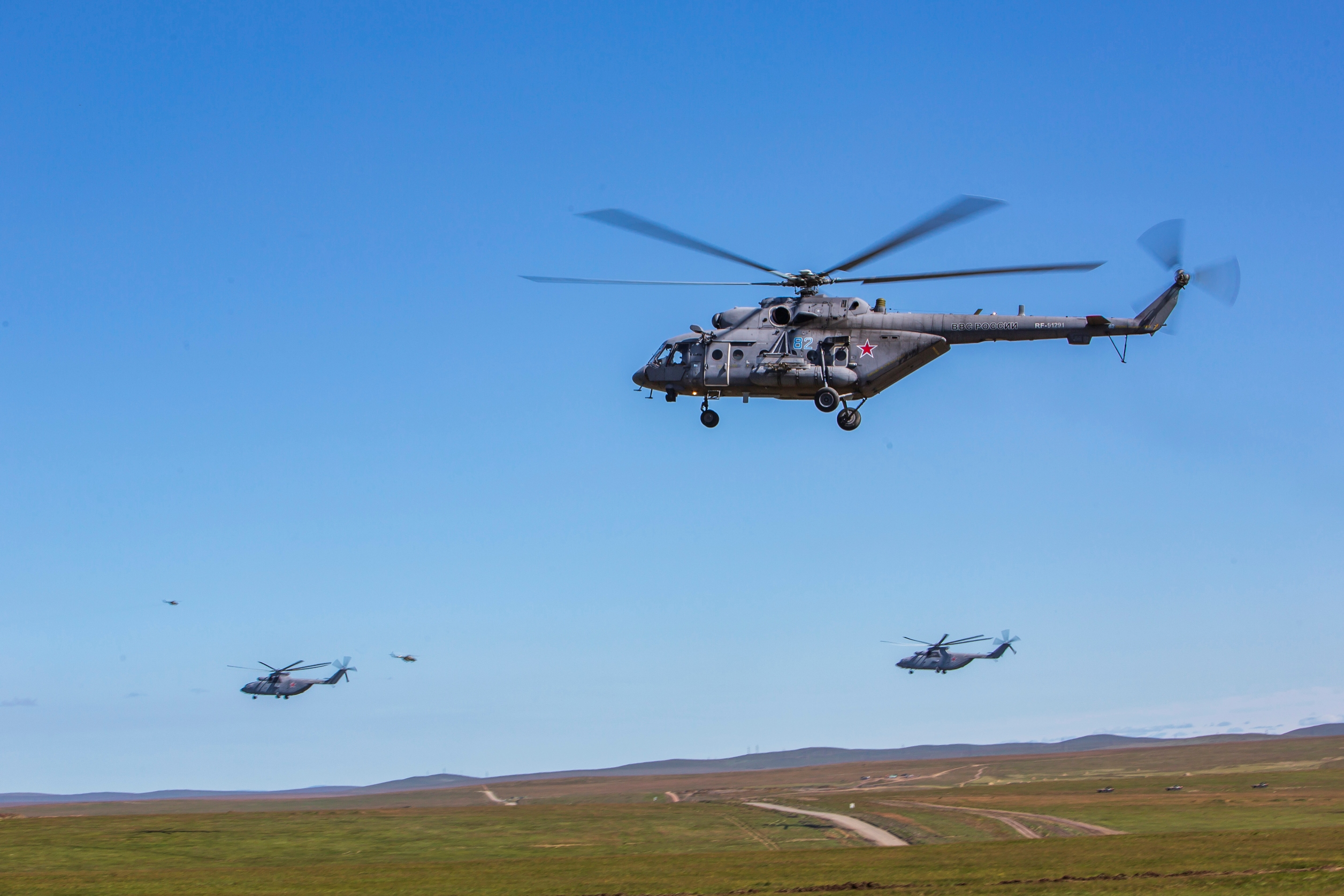
A Russian Mil Mi-8 helicopter

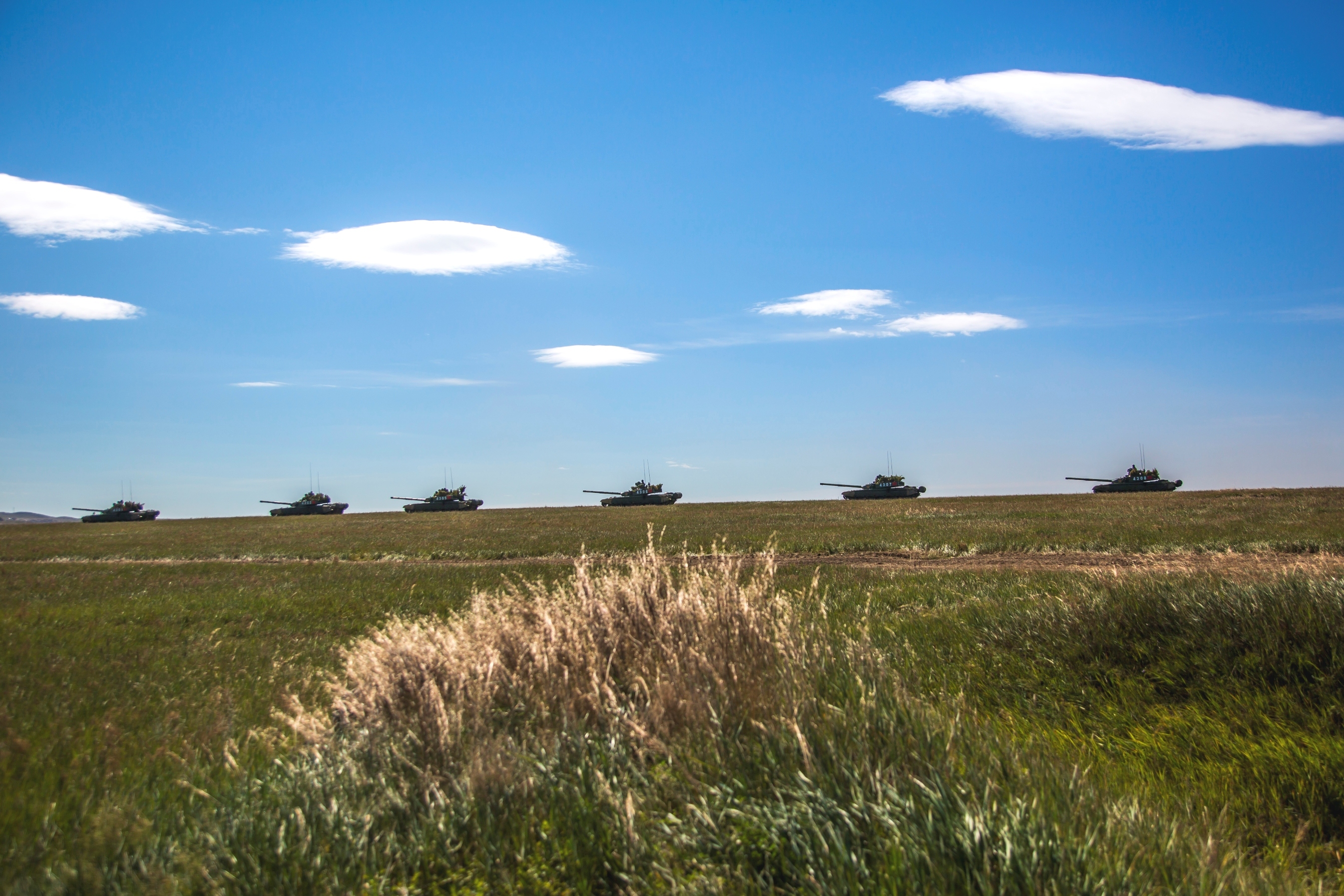
Chinese Type 96 tanks

Vostok 2018 (Russian: Восток 2018, lit. 'East 2018' (Note: Russian exercises have often been named according to their location in the country, for example "Vostok", literally "East", or "Zapad", literally "West".)) was a large-scale Russian military exercise, held from 11 to 17 September 2018, throughout Siberia and the Russian Far East in the Eastern Military District. The exercise involved units from the Army, Air Force and Navy. China and Mongolia, which also participated, became the first countries outside of the former Soviet Union to join the Vostok exercises.

== History ==
In late August 2018, Russian Minister of Defence Sergey Shoigu said the exercise will be the largest to be held in Russia since Zapad-81 held by the Soviet Union in 1981. The Zapad exercises in 1981 involved about 100,000 to 150,000 troops and were the largest Soviet military exercises ever held. Shoigu later reported that nearly 300,000 troops would be taking part in the drills along with 36,000 vehicles and 1,000 aircraft. 80 warships are also involved in the exercise. Vostok 2018 was double the size of the previous exercise in the region, Vostok 2014.

Sergey Shoigu, Russian Minister of Defence, boasted about the drills saying, "Imagine 36,000 military vehicles moving at the same time: tanks, armored personnel carriers, infantry fighting vehicles – and all of this, of course, in conditions as close to a combat situation as possible."

Deputy Defence Minister Colonel General Alexander Fomin reported that 91 foreign observers from 57 countries would be attending the exercise. Vostok 2018 took place during a time of deteriorating relations between Russia and the West.

China and Mongolia too participated in the military exercise. Around 3,500 troops from the People's Liberation Army had taken part.

Before the exercise, Beijing reported that its troops would be participating at the Tsugol training range in the Trans-Baikal region. The Chinese involvement was intended to improve Sino-Russian military relations, as well as to prevent Chinese concern about military exercises near their border. The joint exercise had also allowed Russia to demonstrate it was not militarily isolated.

Again before the exercise, there are reports that there will be sharing of information between the Russian Armed Forces and the People's Liberation Army on combat lessons from the Syrian Civil War.

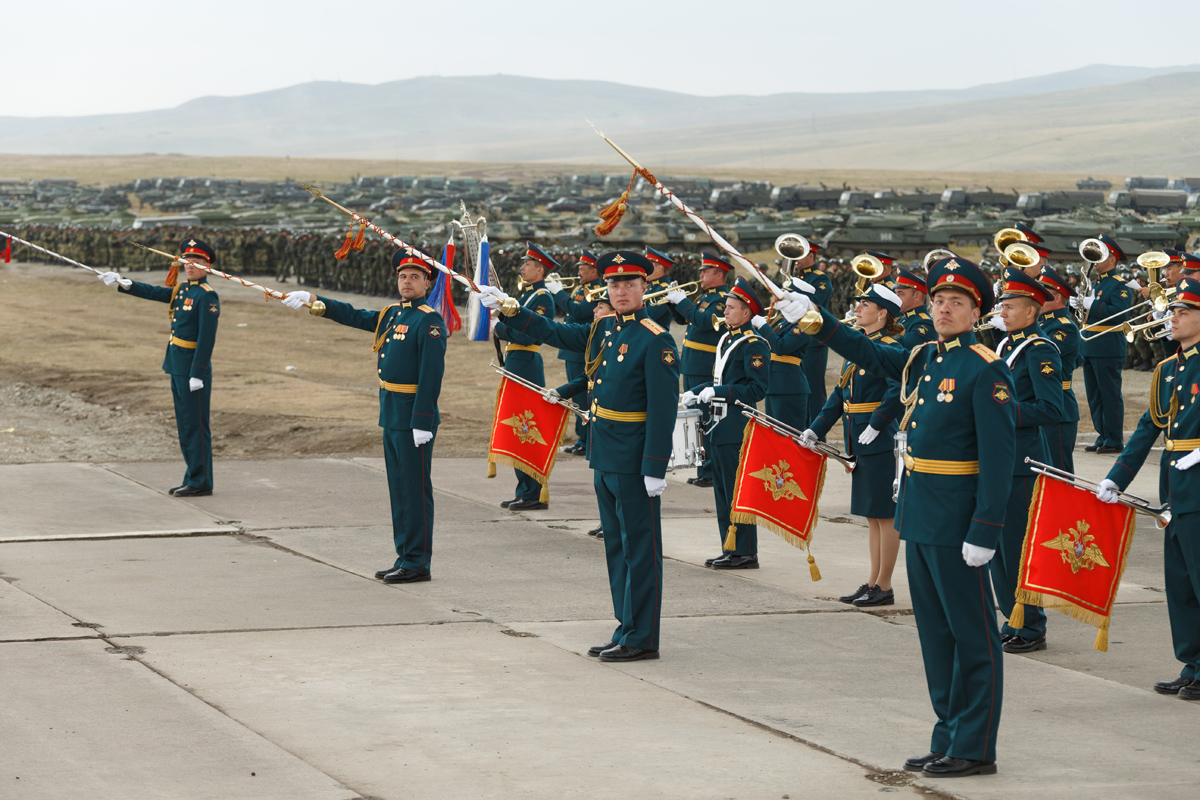
The Military Band of the Eastern Military District during the opening parade of Vostok 2018.

President of Russia Vladimir Putin visited the drills after attending the Eastern Economic Forum in Vladivostok.

In September 2022, a new large-scale military exercise was organised, Vostok 2022.

== See also ==
- Caucasus 2020
- Zapad 2017
- Vostok 2010
- Zapad-81
- Orient Shield exercise
- Mongolia–Russia relations
- China–Mongolia relations
- Shanghai Cooperation Organisation
