= List of Zapad exercises =

Series of Soviet Union and Russian Federation military exercises

Zapad exercise ('Exercise West') is a series of Soviet then Russian Federation military exercises usually held once every four years, including:

- Zapad-77
- Zapad-81
- Zapad-84
- Zapad 1999
- Zapad 2009
- Zapad 2013
- Zapad 2017
- Zapad 2021
- Zapad 2023 (cancelled)
- Zapad 2025

Several of the exercises were joint Russian-Belarusian exercises held on the Belarusian territory.

== See also ==
- List of Center exercises
- List of Kavkaz military exercises
- List of Vostok exercises
