= List of Center exercises =

Russian army exercises

The Center exercises (Центр, Tsentr) are conducted by the Russian Armed Forces every four years in the central part of the country of Central Military District. They are frequently conducted with participation of CSTO members.

- Center 2011 Commons:category:Center 2011
- Center 2015 Commons:category:Center 2015
- Center 2019 Commons:category:Center 2019
- Center 2026

== See also ==
- List of Zapad exercises
- List of Kavkaz military exercises
- List of Vostok exercises
