= Caucasus 2020 =

2020 military exercise

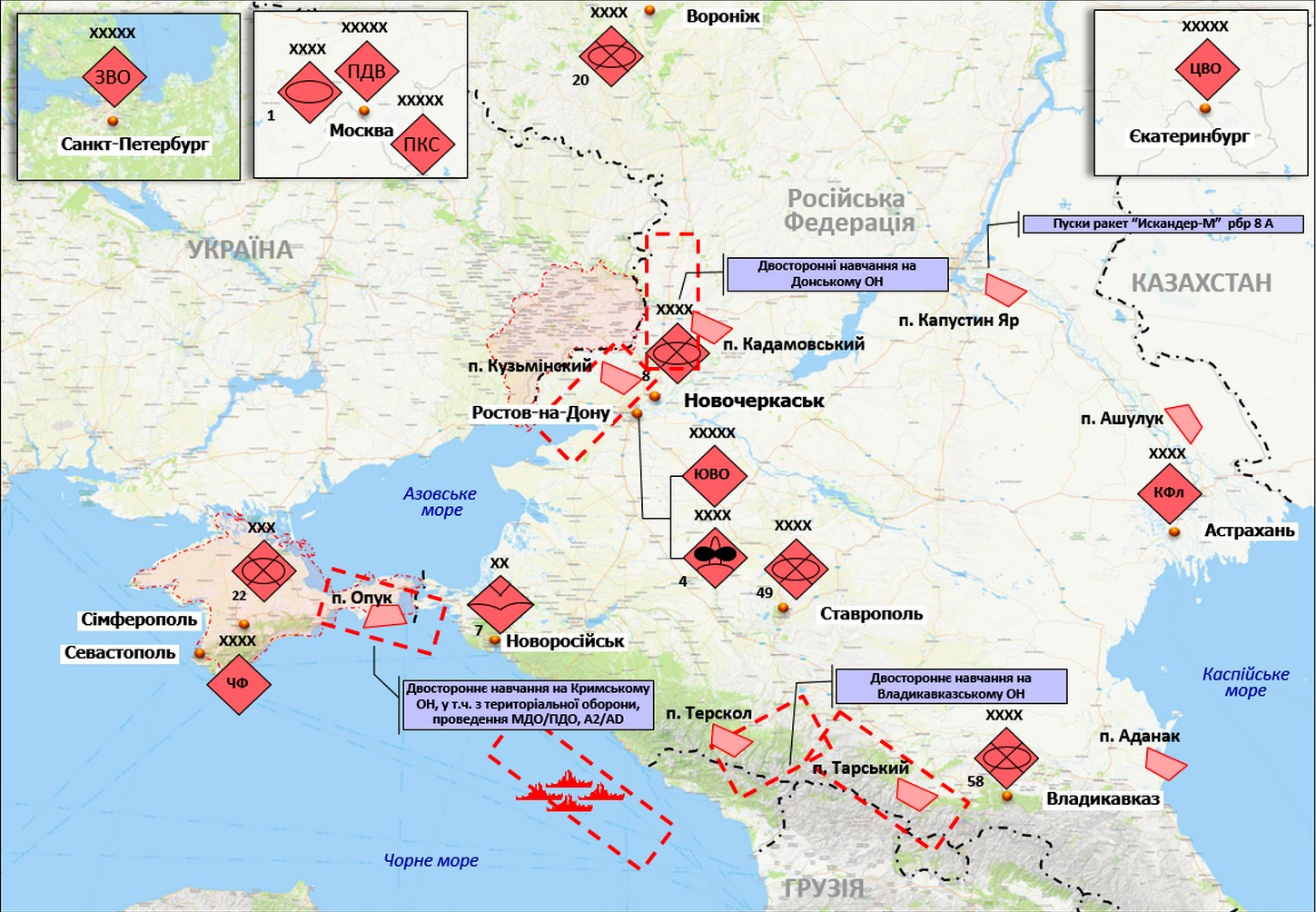
A map of Caucasus 2020

Strategic command and staff exercise "Caucasus-2020" (Russian: Стратегическое командно-штабное учение «Кавказ-2020»), (Note: romanized: Strategicheskoye komando-stabnoye ucheniye "Kavkaz-2020") commonly known as Caucasus 2020 (also called Kavkaz 2020), was a multinational command post exercise in Russia. The exercise took place from September 21 to 26.

The issues practiced in the course of the Kavkaz 2020 cover command and control of groups of troops, formations and subunits in joint operations to localize and resolve armed conflicts related to countering terrorism.

The participation of military contingents from nine foreign countries was planned. Nine more countries would send military observers to Russia.

The main actions would unfold at the Kapustin Yar and Ashuluk training grounds, as well as in the waters of the Black and Caspian Seas.

China, Armenia, Belarus, Iran, Myanmar, and Pakistan took part in the exercise.

India cancelled participation entirely, while Azerbaijan also cancelled participation but sent observers.

== Participants ==
The Jamestown Foundation reported that the following countries were planning to participate:

- Armenia
- Belarus
- China
- Egypt
- Iran
- Kazakhstan
- Kyrgyzstan
- Mongolia
- Myanmar
- Pakistan
- Russia
- Syria
- Tajikistan
- Turkey
- Turkmenistan
- Uzbekistan

Actual participation:Russia, Belarus,...

== See also ==
- List of Kavkaz military exercises
