= Immediate Response 2008 =

2008 joint military exercise between US and Republic of Georgia

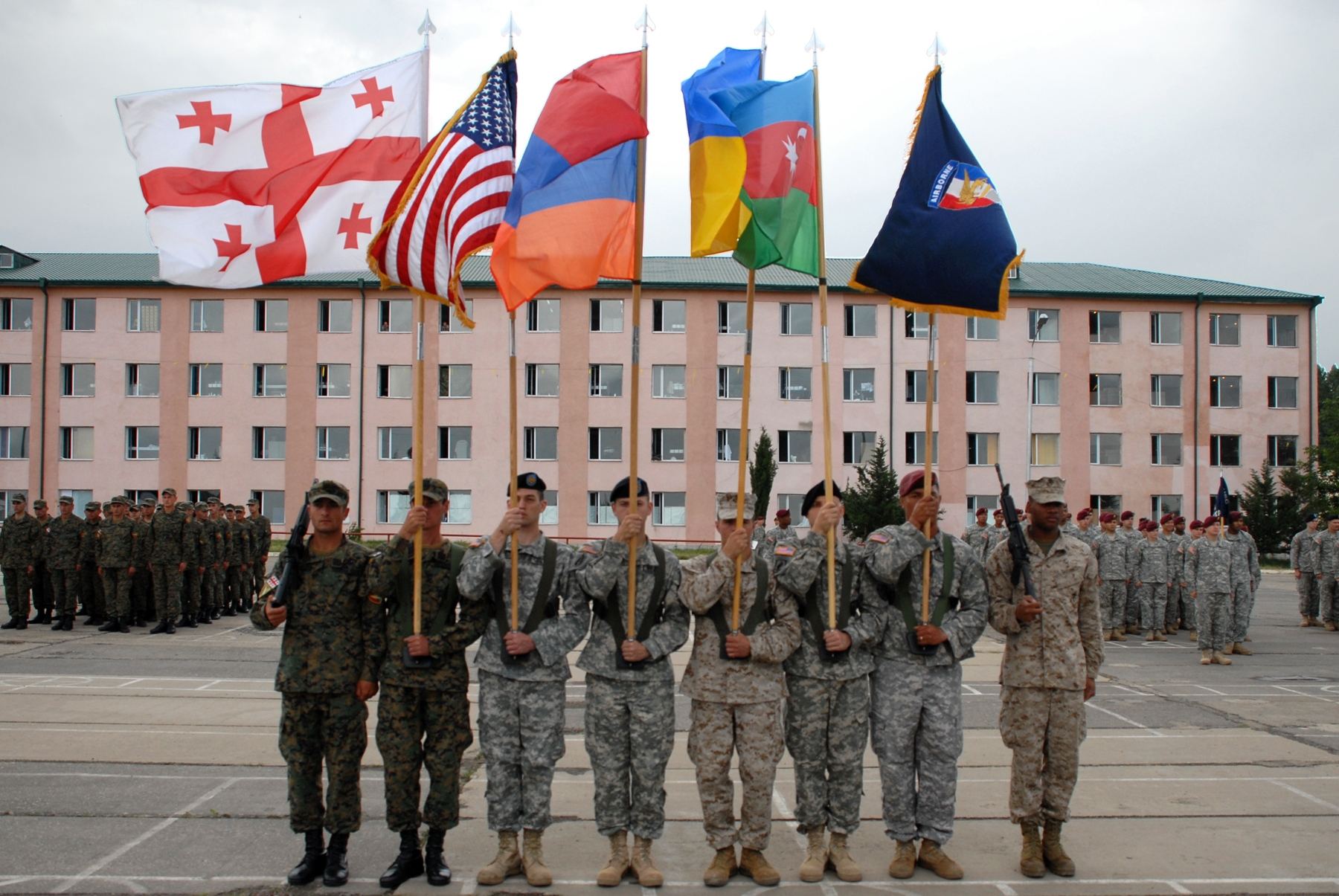
Security cooperation exercise Immediate Response 2008 begins with official ceremony in Republic of Georgia (July 17, 2008)

According to United States European Command,

Immediate Response is an annual, bilateral security cooperation exercise conducted between U.S. and NATO and coalition partners. It is a longstanding Joint Chiefs of Staff-directed exercise focused on interoperability training and theater security cooperation, and is designed to promote understanding and cooperation between military forces of the United States and our allies.

The 2008 exercise was reportedly conducted jointly by the USA and Georgian Armed Forces at the Vaziani Military Base between 15 July and 31 July. Planned by the United States European Command and financed by the U.S. Defense Department at a cost of $8 million. Georgian servicemen totalling 1,630 participated, including representatives of the Joint Staff, Land Forces Staff, IV Brigade, the 41st and 42nd Battalions and Engineer Battalion Company. From the USA, 1,000 military servicemen took part in the exercise including the United States Army Europe, 3rd Battalion 25th Marines, 1st Battalion, 121st Infantry Regiment, Georgia Army National Guard (Atlanta, Georgia) and 5045th Garrison Support Unit. Azerbaijan, Armenia, and Ukraine each had 10 servicemen participating as well.

On July 21, Georgian President Mikheil Saakashvili was personally present and addressed the servicemen, saying:

“The main task of Georgian officers and soldiers is training. This international exercise is a unique case as we have the possibility to hold trainings along with the representatives of the best army in the world for a month. I think that we have created a new military school in Georgia in recent years. Believe that what all of you have learned now will remain in our country and will be shared with the future generations. That is why we have to train theoretically and practically as this is a precondition of victory. The main thing is to get acquainted with independent decision-making and free thinking.”

These exercises were held less than a month before the outbreak of the 2008 South Ossetia war. Almost concurrently, Russia conducted its own military exercises in the north Caucasus (including North Ossetia), called Caucasus Frontier 2008.
