= Vostok 2014 =

2018 Russian military exercise

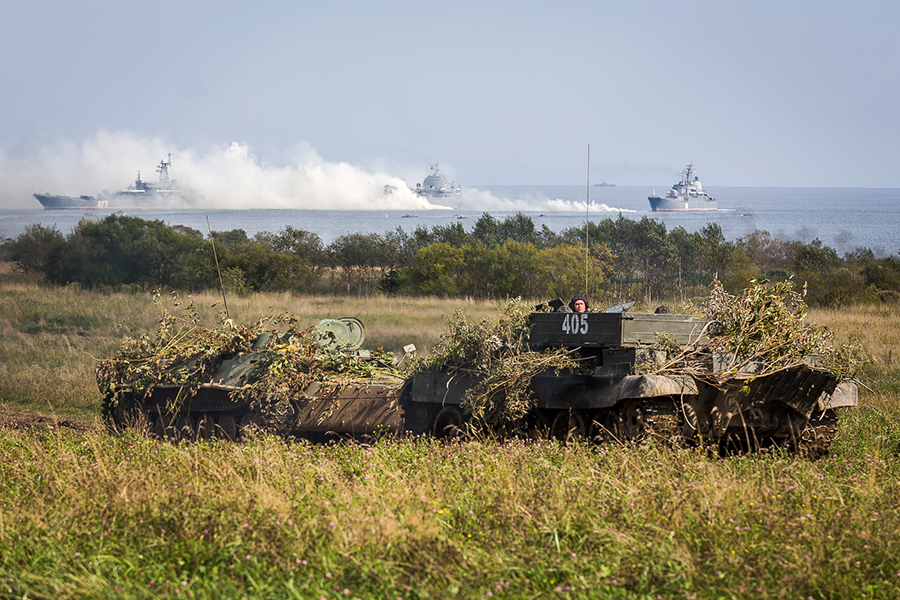
Vostok 2014, Sakhalin

Vostok 2014 (Russian: Восток 2014, lit. 'East 2014') was a large-scale Russian military exercise held in September 19–25, 2014 in Eastern Military District involving the ranges of Sakhalin, Kamchatka, Chukotka, and southern Primorsky Krai. The exercise involved over 100,000 personnel, 1,500 tanks, 120 aircraft, 5,000 pieces of other military hardware. and 70 ships, at 20 ground, sea and air ranges.
