= Centre for Eastern Studies =

Polish think tank analyzing Eastern Europe, Russia, and post-Soviet geopolitical trends

Coordinates: 52.2207°N 21.0231°E

- Ośrodek Studiów Wschodnich
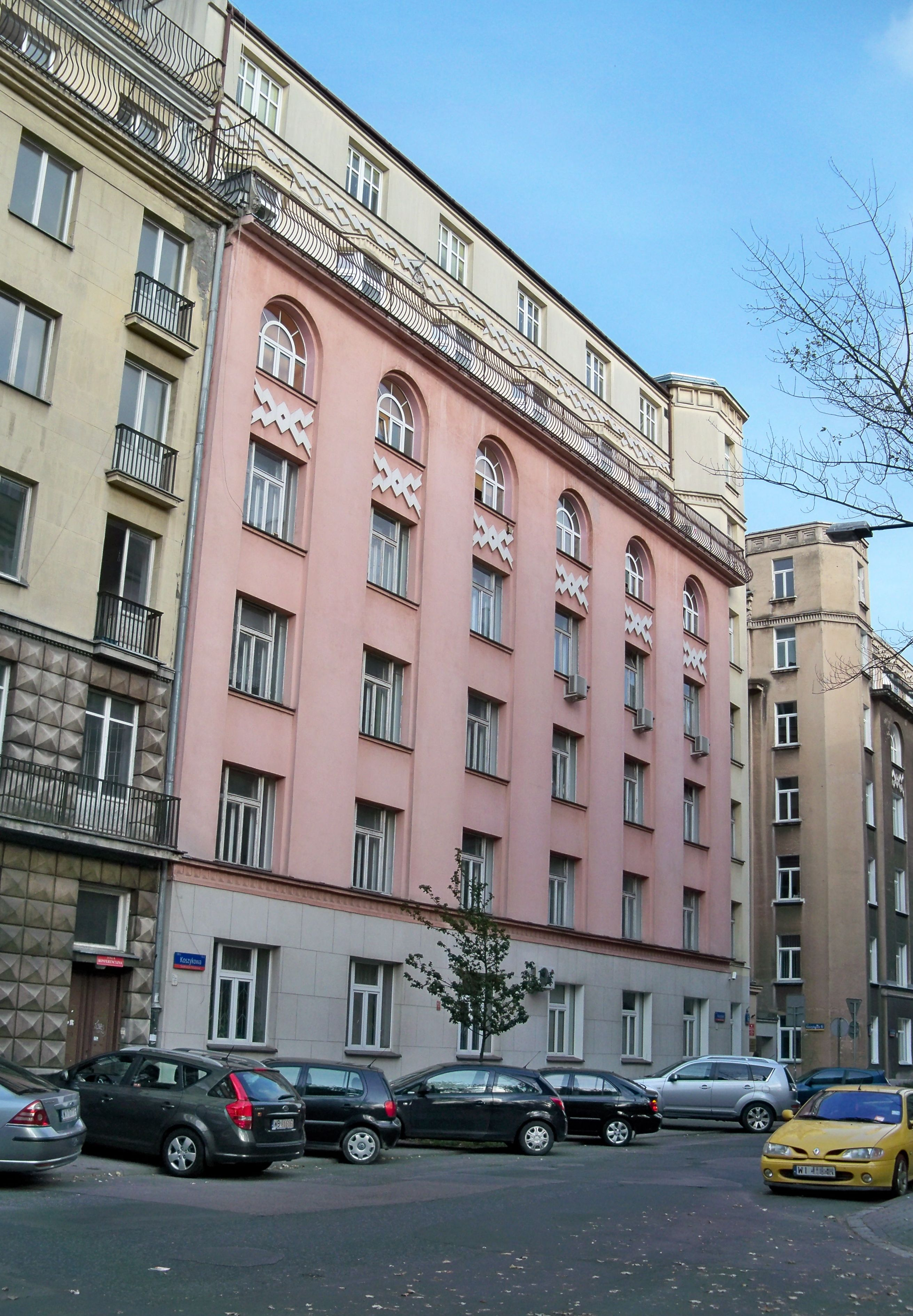
- Named after: Marek Karp
- Location: ul. Koszykowa 6a, Warszawa, Poland
- Key people: Wojciech Konończuk (director)
- Staff: 87
- Website: official website

The Centre for Eastern Studies (Polish: Ośrodek Studiów Wschodnich im. Marka Karpia, OSW) is a Warsaw-based think tank that undertakes independent research on the political, economic and social situation in Central and Eastern Europe, Balkans, Caucasus and Central Asia.

The centre was founded in 1990 and is fully financed from the Polish state budget. In 2006 the centre was named in honour of its founder Marek Karp, who was killed in a car crash in 2004 by a Belarusian truck driver.

The OSW is one of the largest European Union's think tanks to focus its research on the part of Europe which until 1989 had been separated from the West by the Iron Curtain. In 2025, OSW had 394 publications, compared with a global average of 15; 110,000 followers on Twitter/X, compared with a global average of 20,000; and over 260,000 subscribers on YouTube, compared with a global average of 7,500.

The centre is particularly active in debates concerning the European Union's policy towards its Eastern neighbours (European Neighbourhood Policy, Eastern Partnership), challenges to energy security in Europe, as well as the political, social and economic transformation of countries neighbouring Poland.

== Staff and work groups ==
As of May 2026, OSW employs 87 staff members, 52 of whom are research fellows.

The centre's director is Wojciech Konończuk.

There are seven research units and a few single specialists (in energy policy and military aspects of international security), and their heads are:

- Russian Department - Marek Menkiszak
- Department for Belarus, Ukraine and Moldova - Tadeusz Iwański
- Department for Turkey, Caucasus and Central Asia - Karol Wasilewski
- Central European Department - PhD Andrzej Sadecki
- Department for Germany and Northern Europe - PhD Anna Kwiatkowska-Drożdż
- Security and Defence Department - Justyna Gotkowska
- China Department - Jakub Jakóbowski.

== Publications ==
Most of the OSW publications are available free of charge at the centre's web site, both in Polish and English (including "Analyses", "OSW Commentary", "OSW Studies" and "OSW Report").
