= Russian landing ship Aleksandr Shabalin =

Russian Navy landing ship

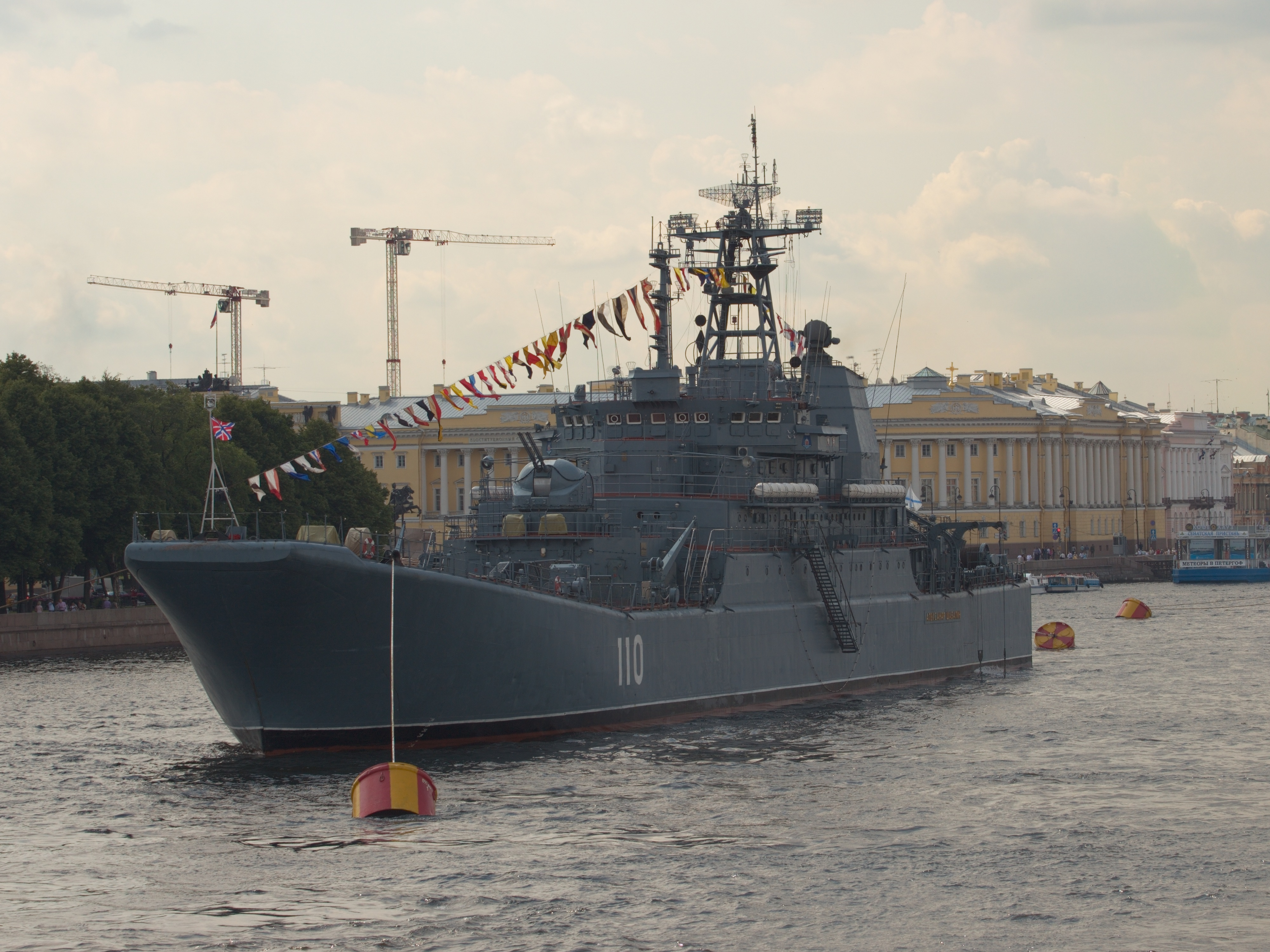

History

Russia
- Name: BDK-60 (1985–1986); Aleksandr Shabalin (1986–present)
- Namesake: Aleksandr Shabalin
- Builder: Stocznia Północna, Gdańsk, Poland
- Laid down: 1985
- Launched: 11 June 1985
- Commissioned: 31 December 1985
- Home port: Baltiysk
- Identification: Hull number: 128 (1986–1987); 101 (1987–1990); 110 (1990–present)
- Status: In service

General characteristics
- Class & type: Ropucha-class landing ship
- Displacement: 3,450 t (3,396 long tons) standard; 4,080 t (4,016 long tons) full load
- Length: 112.5 m (369 ft 1 in)
- Beam: 15.01 m (49 ft 3 in)
- Draught: 4.26 m (14 ft 0 in)
- Ramps: Over bows and at stern
- Installed power: 3 × 750 kW (1,006 hp) diesel generators
- Propulsion: 2 × 9,600 hp (7,159 kW) Zgoda-Sulzer 16ZVB40/48 diesel engines
- Speed: 18 knots (33 km/h; 21 mph)
- Range: 6,000 nmi (11,000 km; 6,900 mi) at 12 knots (22 km/h; 14 mph); 3,500 nmi (6,500 km; 4,000 mi) at 16 knots (30 km/h; 18 mph)
- Endurance: 30 days
- Capacity: 10 × main battle tanks and 340 troops or 12 × BTR APC and 340 troops or 3 × main battle tanks, 3 × 2S9 Nona-S SPG, 5 × MT-LB APC, 4 trucks and 313 troops or 500 tons of cargo
- Complement: 98
- Armament: 2 × AK-725 twin 57 mm (2.2 in) DP guns; 4 × 8 Strela 2 SAM launchers; 2 × 22 A-215 Grad-M rocket launchers

Aleksandr Shabalin (Russian: Александр Шабалин) is a Ropucha-class landing ship of the Russian Navy and part of the Baltic Fleet.

Named after the Soviet naval officer and twice-Hero of the Soviet Union Aleksandr Shabalin, the ship was built in Poland and launched in 1985. She was named BDK-60 (Russian: БДК-60) for Russian: Большой десантный корабль, romanized: Bolshoy desantnyi korabl', lit. 'large landing ship', from her construction until being renamed Aleksandr Shabalin in 1986. She is one of the subtype of the Ropucha-class landing ships, designated Project 775/II by the Russian Navy.

== Construction and commissioning ==
Aleksandr Shabalin was built as BDK-60 by Stocznia Północna, part of Gdańsk Shipyard, in Gdańsk, in what was then the Polish People's Republic. She was laid down in 1985, and launched on 11 June 1985. She was commissioned into the Soviet Navy on 31 December 1985 as part of its Baltic Fleet, homeported in Baltiysk, and with the dissolution of the Soviet Union in late December 1991, she went on to serve in the Russian Navy.

== Career ==
In service since 1985 as BDK-60, she was renamed Aleksandr Shabalin on 12 November 1986. Aleksandr Shabalin was undergoing a refit at the Yantar Shipyard in Kaliningrad, when a fire broke out in the engine room on 10 April 2009, subsequently spreading to the refrigeration compartment and burnt out 5 square meters. Twelve fire engines and 42 firefighters successfully extinguished the fire. Also that month a greeting card with nine compressed hashish plates glued to it was found on board during a check of letters, leading to the filling of a criminal case.

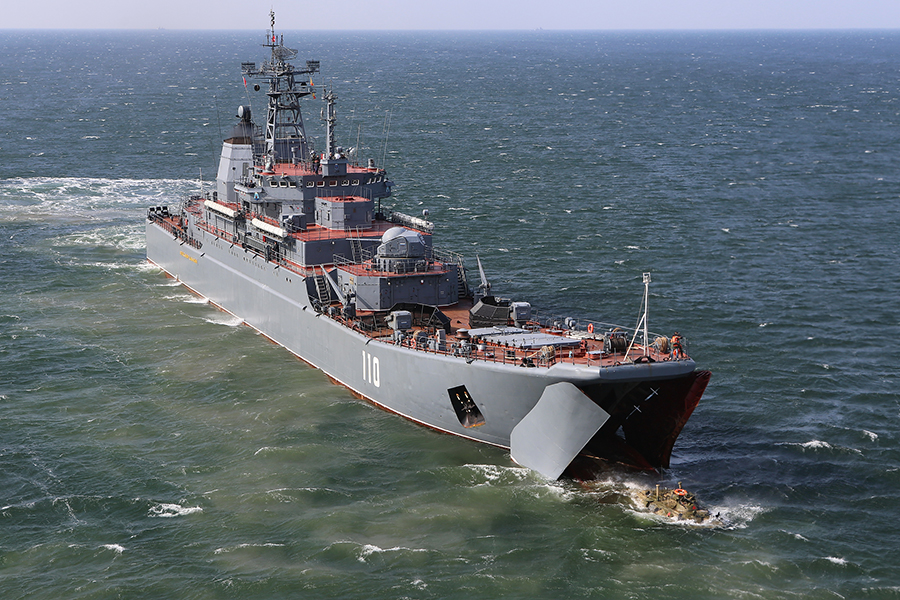
Aleksandr Shabalin carrying out landing exercises in the Baltic in 2015

The ship entered the Yantar Shipyard again on 16 April 2012 for repairs, but was back at sea for a two-week voyage in early July, which included a visit to Zeebrugge for Belgian Navy Day. She was dispatched the following year to the Mediterranean as part of the Syrian Express, transporting personnel and equipment between Black Sea ports and the Russian naval facility in Tartus, going on to support the Russian intervention in the Syrian civil war. She entered the naval base at Novorossiysk on 21 January and 27 March 2013, and made return visits to the Mediterranean in 2014 and 2015. On 18 May 2015 she was part of Maritime Interaction 2015, joint exercises with the People's Liberation Army Navy consisting of Aleksandr Shabalin and her sister ship Aleksandr Otrakovsky, the cruiser Moskva, the corvette Samum, the frigate Ladny, and the ocean-going tug MB-31. The Chinese contingent consisted of the frigates Linyi and Weifang, and the supply ship Weishanhu. On 26 July 2015, Aleksandr Shabalin was present at the Navy Day naval parade in Baltiysk. She took part in naval gunnery exercises on 13 July 2016. On 30 July 2017, she was present at the Navy Day naval parade on Kronstadt.

After assessments, the ship began a refit at the Kronstadt Marine Plant in October 2020. Work lasted until mid-2023, with sea trials expected to begin in July that year, with approval for her return to the Baltic Fleet expected in October-November 2023. The trials were delayed until February 2024, with the ship not returning to service until the summer that year. She carried out landing exercises on 8 August, and on 13 August 2024, she carried out gunnery exercises in the Baltic Sea. In September, she and the Baltic Fleet corvettes Boikiy and Soobrazitelny sailed to the Northern Fleet ranges for exercise Okean 2024.

In December 2024, Aleksandr Shabalin, her sister ship Aleksandr Otrakovsky and the Ivan Gren-class landing ship Ivan Gren were dispatched to the Russian naval installation at Tartus, Syria, to begin removing equipment following the Fall of the Assad regime, and transporting it to Libya. She was back in the Baltic the following year, where she carried out further exercises on 29 March 2025.

In late September 2025 she was reported to be loitering near the border between Danish and international waters in the extreme South West of the Baltic. There were suspicions that the ship was linked to the multiple drone observations disturbing the operation on a number of Danish airports. The ship remained active in 2026.
