= Shabalin =

Shabalin (masculine, Russian: Шабалин) or Shabalina (feminine, Russian: Шабалина) is a Russian surname. Notable people with the surname include:

- Aleksandr Shabalin (1914-1982), Soviet naval officer
- Maxim Shabalin (born 1982), Russian ice dancer
- Pavel Shabalin (born 1988), Kazakh soccer player
- Sergey Shabalin (born 1971), Kazakh fencer
- Valeriia Shabalina (born 1995), Russian Paralympic swimmer
