= Syrian Express =

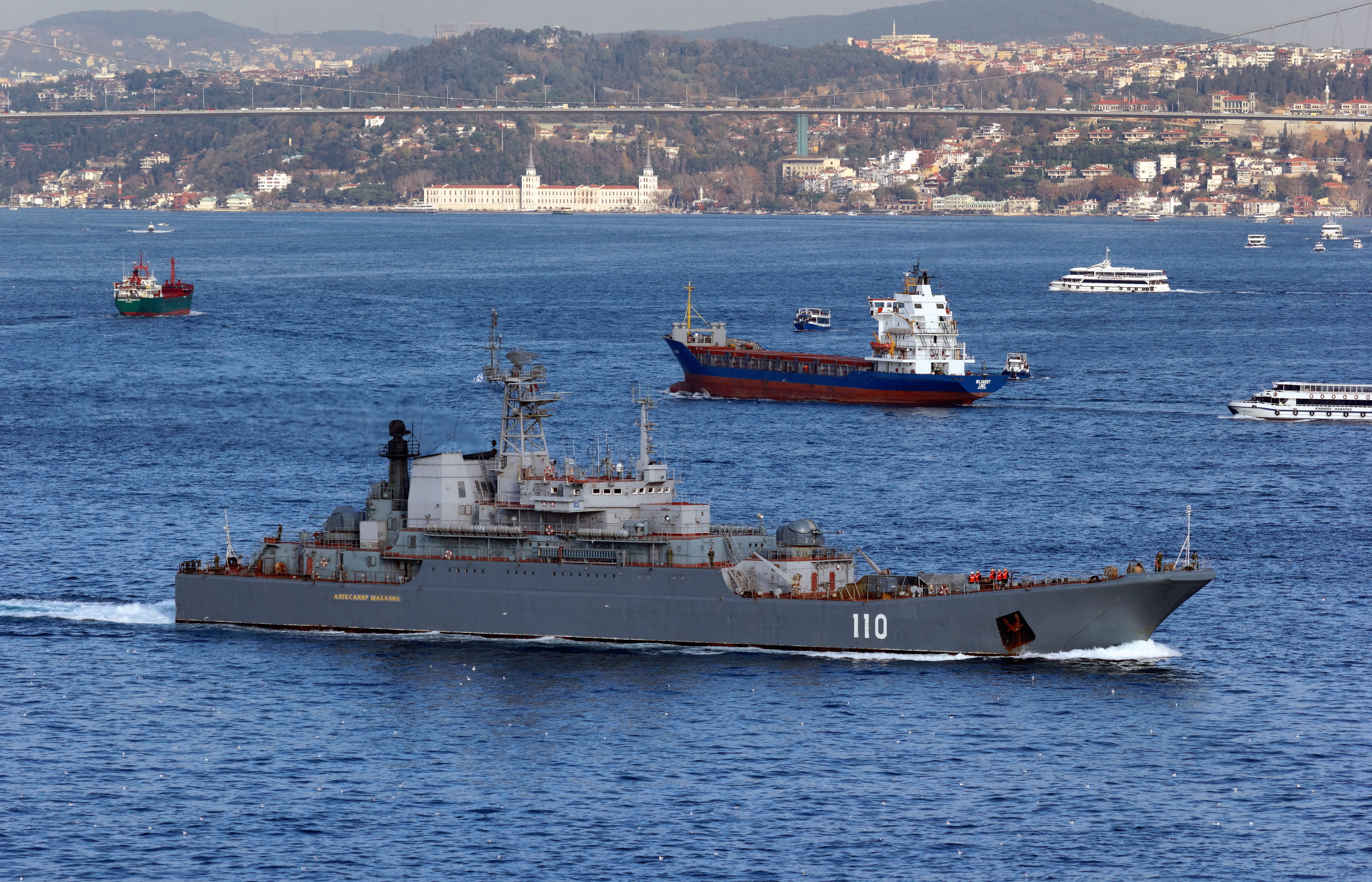
The landing ship Aleksandr Shabalin transits the Bosporus on 23 November 2013

The Syrian Express is the name used to describe Russia’s maritime supply and logistics network, which has been used since 2012 to transport weapons, military equipment, troops, and supplies between Russian ports and the Syrian Mediterranean port of Tartus. The supply voyages through the Bosporus to Ba'athist Syria, in particular using amphibious warfare ships of the Russian Navy, that were made during the Syrian civil war (2011–2024). Following the Russian invasion of Ukraine in 2022 the Turkish authorities were persuaded to implement terms of the Montreux convention, banning the passage of further military vessels through the Bosporus. With the fall of the Syrian regime the change in nature of the Russian intervention in the Syrian civil war will lead to a further change in the nature of the traffic using this route.

== Name ==
The supply route to Syria was dubbed the "Syrian Express" by Russian sailors after its launch in 2012. Presumably, it is a reference to the Imperial Japanese Navy's Tokyo Express, supplying Japanese forces during the Guadalcanal campaign in the Pacific theater of World War II.

== History ==
Initially, it was primarily russian landing ships and auxiliary vessels of the Black Sea Fleet that transited the Bosphorus en route to Syria. Following Turkey’s enforcement of the Montreux Convention in 2022 which closed the straits to belligerent parties in the wake of the Russian full invasion of Ukraine, Russia increasingly relied on vessels from its Baltic and Northern Fleets, as well as civilian freighters and tankers, routing them via the Atlantic Ocean, the Strait of Gibraltar, and the Mediterranean Sea.

The following four Russian vessels were part of the convoy that traveled through the Mediterranean in September 2026: MV Sparta, General Skobelev (tanker), Akademik Pashin (supply/oil tanker) and the escorting Udaloy-class destroyer Admiral Levchenko. The vessels passed through the Strait of Gibraltar in late August 2026, switched off some of their AIS transponders, and arrived in Tartus in early September 2026. Throughout its entire route from the North Sea to the eastern Mediterranean, the convoy was subject to continuous, multi-layered NATO shadowing. First by the royal navy, up from Gibraltar by the Italian navys frigate Carabiniere (F 581).

== Ships involved ==
=== Black Sea Fleet ===
==== 197th Landing Ship Brigade ====
- Azov
- Tsezar Kunikov (out of service)
- Yamal
- Nikolai Filchenkov
- Novocherkassk (out of service)
- Saratov (out of service)

Others

- Kyzyl-60 (ex-Smyrna, Turkey)
- Kazan-60 (ex–Georgy Agafonov, Ukraine)
- Vologda-50 (ex-Dadali, Turkey)
- Dvinitsa-50 (ex–Alican Deval, Turkey)

=== Baltic Fleet ===
- Aleksandr Shabalin
- Kaliningrad
- Korolyov
- Minsk
- Stoikiy (2026)

=== Northern Fleet ===
- Georgy Pobedonosets
- Aleksandr Otrakovsky
- Admiral Levchenko (2026)
- Admiral Kasatonov (2026)

=== Civilian vessels ===
- MV Alexander Tkachenko
- General Skobelev (tanker)
- Akademik Pashin (supply/oil tanker)
- MV Sparta
- MV Sparta II
- MV Ursa Major (formely Sparta III), sunk in 2025
- MV Sparta IV
- Akson Serin (Bulk Carrier)
- e.g. owned by the Oboronlogistika company
