= MV Ursa Major =

Heavy-lift ship that that sank in the Mediterranean

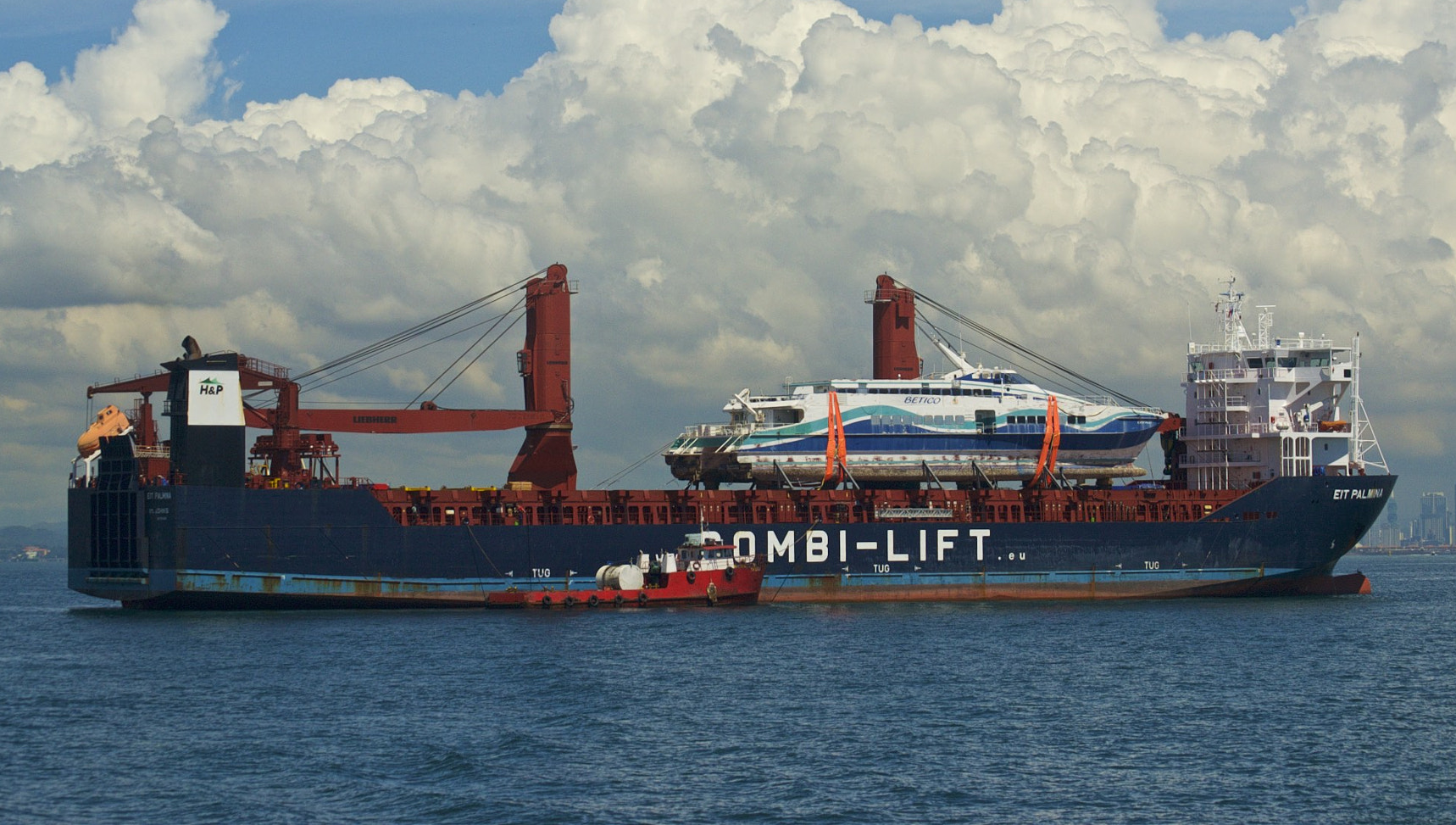
- EIT Palmina in 2016

History
- Name: Scan Britania (2009–2010); Hyundai Britania (2010–2011); EIT Palmina (2011–2017); Sparta III (2017–2021); Ursa Major (2021–2024)
- Namesake: Ursa Major (since 2021)
- Owner: Oboronlogistika
- Port of registry: Douglas, Isle of Man (2009–2011); Germany (2011); St. John's, Antigua and Barbuda (2011–2017); Belize City, Belize (2017); Novorossiysk, Russia (2017–2024)
- Ordered: 15 September 2008
- Builder: Peene-Werft (Wolgast, Germany)
- Yard number: 251
- Laid down: 28 January 2009
- Launched: 28 October 2009
- Completed: 14 December 2009
- Identification: IMO number: 9538892; MMSI number: 273396130; Call sign: UFUZ
- Fate: Sank, 23 December 2024

General characteristics
- Type: Heavy-lift ship
- Tonnage: 12,679 GT; 3,804 NT; 9,490 DWT
- Displacement: 16,335 t (16,077 long tons)
- Length: 142.47 m (467.4 ft)
- Beam: 23.20 m (76.1 ft)
- Draught: 7.20 m (23.6 ft)
- Ice class: 1A
- Installed power: MAN B&W 16V32/40, 8,000 kW
- Propulsion: Single controllable pitch propeller
- Speed: 17 knots (31 km/h; 20 mph)
- Crew: 16

MV Ursa Major was a heavy-lift ship that operated from 2009 to 2024. She was built in Germany in 2009 as Scan Britania. She was renamed Hyundai Britania in 2010; EIT Palmina in 2011; Sparta III in 2017; and Ursa Major in 2021.

In 2024, she sank in the western Mediterranean, with the loss of two of her sixteen crew. At the time of the sinking, the ship was owned by the Russian state corporation Oboronlogistika. A Russian Navy investigation in situ later determined that Ursa Major had been sunk as the consequence of "an act of terrorism".

== Building and description ==
The ship was ordered on 15 September 2008 from Peene-Werft in Wolgast, Germany. Rolandwerft of Berne, Germany built and delivered her forward and cargo sections. The ship was built as yard number 251. She was laid down on 28 January, launched on 28 October, and delivered on 14 December 2009. Her length overall was 142.47 metres (467.4 ft), her beam was 23.20 metres (76.1 ft), and her draught was 7.2 metres (24 ft). Two heavy cranes were mounted on her port side. Her superstructure and bridge were on her forecastle, leaving her deck as clear as possible for bulky cargo, which then could not obstruct the forward view from her bridge.

Her main engine was a single 8,000-kilowatt (11,000 hp) 16-cylinder MAN B&W 16V32/40 medium-speed diesel engine manufactured by STX Corporation under license in South Korea. It drove a single controllable pitch propeller, giving her a service speed of 13 knots (24 km/h; 15 mph) and a maximum speed of 17 knots (31 km/h; 20 mph).

== Names and registries ==
The ship's IMO number was 9538892, and her MMSI number was 273396130. When completed as Scan Britania in December 2009, she was registered in the Isle of Man. In February 2010, she was renamed Hyundai Britania, and in 2011 her registration was transferred to Germany. In August 2011, the ship was renamed EIT Palmina, and her registration was transferred to Antigua and Barbuda. In February 2017, she was renamed Sparta III, and her registration was transferred to Belize. In April 2017 her registration was transferred to Russia, and in October 2021 she was renamed Ursa Major. By 2019 the Russian military logistics company Oboronlogistika was managing her, and by 2024 she was registered in Novorossiysk. Oboronlogistika said the ship was its flagship. Her direct owner and operator was a company called SK-Yug.

== Russian career ==
In September 2019, as Sparta III, the ship brought a cargo from China to Europe via the Northern Sea Route. This was 27 percent shorter than sailing around Asia to the south, which made her voyage ten days shorter. It avoided the Suez Canal with its attendant toll, and the risk of piracy in parts of the Indian Ocean. Oboronlogistika claimed that the voyage saved € 300,000. At the time, the Northern Sea Route was usable from August to October.

In late 2020, Sparta III became ice-bound near Mys Sopochnaya Karga in the Yenisey river estuary in the Russian Arctic. The 1979–built icebreaking anchor handling tug supply vessel Kigoriak, which had been chartered to escort her, was unable to free her, so Oboronlogistika asked FSUE Atomflot to divert one of its nuclear-powered icebreakers operating in the Gulf of Ob to free both ships. Rosatom deployed the nuclear-powered Vaygach to break a channel and the diesel-electric Admiral Makarov to tow Sparta III to the ice edge where the ship, having damaged its steering gear, was handed over to the ice-strengthened salvage ship Spasatel Karev, which towed it to Arkhangelsk.

Oboronlogistika is a Russian state corporation handling marine military logistics. For years, the ship carried matériel on Russia's "Syrian Express" supply route to Tartus naval base in Syria. Another ship named Sparta, Sparta IV, had also previously involved in the Syrian Express. Some of that matériel was destined for Khmeimim Air Base. In 2022, after the Russian invasion of Ukraine, the US Government sanctioned the ship.

== Loss ==
Location of sinking

On 11 December 2024, Ursa Major left St Petersburg for Vladivostok. As it was winter, she was to sail via the Suez Canal. Her cargo was reported to include two 45-ton hatches for a Project 10510 icebreaker that was under construction, and two Liebherr 420 mobile cranes to be installed at the Port of Vladivostok. Ursa Major was travelling in the company of Sparta IV. Some reports claimed that Ursa Major was headed for Tartus again, however, Tartus was not indicated as a port of call, only Vladivostok.

By 22 December, when the ship was in international waters between Spain and Algeria, satellite tracking showed that her speed suddenly dropped to 1 knot (2 km/h). According to TASS, there was an explosion in her engine room. By 23 December, she was drifting south at 1 knot. Photographs published online showed her down by her stern, with her bow and forward superstructure raised, and listing to starboard.

According to a notice to mariners by the Spanish agency Salvamento Marítimo, Ursa Major sank on 23 December at 23:22 UTC at position 36°27′30.0″N 0°53′26.4″W, at 2.5 km (1.6 mi) water depth between Águilas in Spain and Oran in Algeria. Spanish fishing vessels, the Spanish patrol boat Serviola, and the rescue ship Clara Campoamor rescued 14 members of her crew, and landed them at Cartagena. Two other crew members were reported to be missing.

== Investigation ==
On 25 December, Russian state news agency RIA Novosti reported that Ursa Major was victim of "an act of terrorism", and described the sinking as being the result of three explosions, citing the vessel's owner Oboronlogistika.

According to Oboronlogistika’s press service, three explosions occurred on board the Russian vessel, resulting in a breach measuring 50 by 50 centimeters. The damage was found above the waterline, 15–30 centimeters above the surface. Company representatives stated that the edges of the hole had a torn structure directed inward into the hull. The deck was covered with debris.

In January 2025, the Russian intelligence vessel Yantar arrived at the site of the Ursa Major sinking to conduct an underwater investigation. The presence on board of Rear Admiral Aleksandr Konovalov, commander of the 29th Special Purpose Submarine Brigade, indicated the seriousness of the inquiry. The Yantar is equipped with unique underwater reconnaissance capabilities, including manned and unmanned submersibles, enabling a thorough examination of the sunken ship.

On 28 January 2025, Nikolai Patrushev, Assistant to the President of Russia, stated in an interview with Rossiyskaya Gazeta that the sinking had resulted from a terrorist attack and could have been organized by one of the unfriendly countries.

In May 2026, a CNN investigation reported that Spanish investigators suspected the vessel had been carrying two VM-4SG nuclear reactor housings, possibly intended for North Korea's nuclear submarine program. According to the report, satellite imagery and the vessel's unusual cargo configuration led Spanish authorities to conclude that the ship may have been transporting undeclared nuclear-related equipment disguised beneath large hatch covers. Investigators also reportedly examined whether the vessel's final destination may have been the North Korean port of Rason rather than Vladivostok, as officially declared.

CNN further reported that Spanish investigators considered the possibility that the vessel had been damaged by a supercavitating torpedo, believed available only to the militaries of the United States, a few NATO allies, Russia and Iran, citing the pattern of hull damage and seismic signals recorded near the sinking site, although no official attribution was made.
