= Russian destroyer Admiral Levchenko =

Soviet and Russian naval vessel

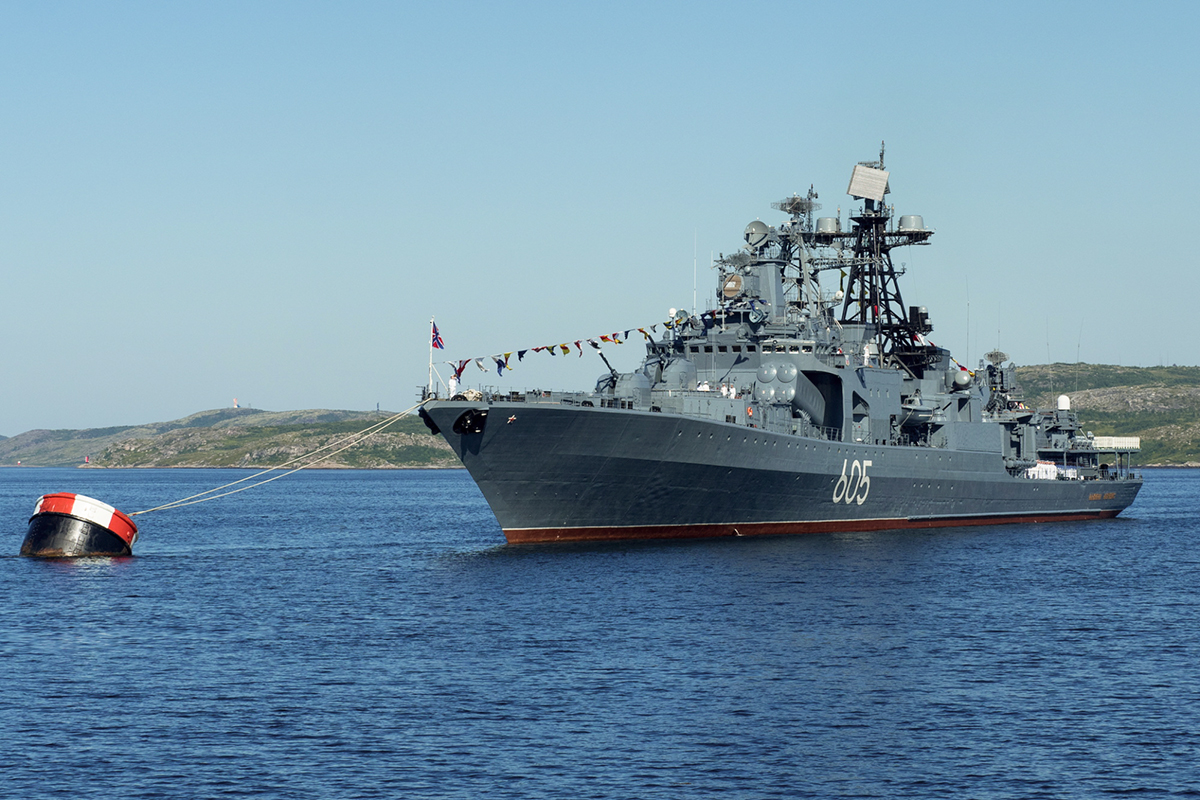
- Admiral Levchenko in Kola Bay, 2018

History

Russia
- Name: Admiral Levchenko
- Namesake: Gordey Levchenko
- Laid down: 27 January 1982
- Launched: 21 February 1985
- Commissioned: 30 September 1988
- Home port: Russian Northern Fleet
- Identification: DDG-605
- Status: Active

General characteristics
- Class & type: Udaloy-class destroyer
- Displacement: 6,200 t (6,102 long tons) standard; 7,900 t (7,775 long tons) full load
- Length: 163 m (535 ft)
- Beam: 19 m (62 ft)
- Draught: 7.8 m (26 ft)
- Installed power: 89,000 kW (120,000 shp)
- Propulsion: 2 shaft COGAG, 4 gas turbines
- Speed: 35 knots (65 km/h; 40 mph)
- Range: 10,500 nmi (19,400 km; 12,100 mi) at 14 knots (26 km/h; 16 mph)
- Complement: 300
- Armament: 2 × quadruple SS-N-14 anti-submarine missiles; 8 × octuple launchers for SA-N-9 surface-to-air missiles; 2 × single 100 mm (3.9 in) (AK-100 guns); 4 × 30 mm Gatling guns; 2 × quadruple 533 mm (21.0 in) torpedo tubes; 2 × RBU-6000 anti-submarine rocket launchers
- Aircraft carried: 2 × Kamov Ka-27 'Helix' helicopters
- Aviation facilities: Helicopter deck and hangar

Admiral Levchenko is a Russian anti-submarine warfare destroyer of the Udaloy class. The ship was laid down in 1982 and was commissioned in the Soviet Navy in 1988. After the fall of the Soviet Union the ship continued to serve in the Russian Navy with the Northern Fleet. She was named after Admiral Gordey Levchenko.

== History ==
In 2010 Admiral Levchenko was part of the Russian operations to combat piracy off the Somali coast.

By 2020, she was reported inactive due to an overhaul. The overhaul includes upgrading ship's fire-fighting systems, onboard electronics, new cooling units and shut-off valves. The ship should also receive Russia's newest Otvet anti-submarine missile system. She was expected to return to service in late 2022 but was reported active post-refit as of May 2022.

On 26 May 2022, the destroyer conducted exercises in the Barents Sea.

On 8 September 2022, Admiral Levchenko held exercises along the Northern Sea Route, along with the tank landing ship Aleksandr Otrakovsky, tanker Sergey Osipov and tug Pamir. On 10 October, the three ships returned to Severomorsk.

On 10 June 2024 Ukrainian Navy spokesman Dmytro Pletenchuk (Note: Press chief for the Operational Command South of the Ukraine's Armed Forces) claimed, but without producing any evidence, that Admiral Levchenko was on fire in the Barents Sea; Pletenchuk's claim, although not corroborated elsewhere, was repeated by various Ukrainian and Western news agencies.

On 14 July 2024, Admiral Levchenko, the Ivan Gren-class landing ship Ivan Gren, and the Victor III-class submarine Tambov left the Baltic Sea. She was active again in exercises in 2025 and 2026.

In August 2026, she was reported in the Mediterranean accompanying the oil product tanker General Skobelev, the cargo vessel Sparta, and the Russian Navy oiler Akademik Pashin.
