= MV Sparta II =

Russian RoRo cargo vessel

History
- Name: Sloman Provider (2001-2016); Sparta II (since)
- Namesake: Sparta II (since 2016)
- Owner: Oboronlogistika
- Port of registry: Germany (2001-2006); Antigua & Barbuda (2006-2016); Belize (2016); Russia (since 2016)
- Builder: Turkey
- Identification: IMO number: 9160994; MMSI number: 273394890; Call sign: UAXX
- Fate: burning
- Status: alive

General characteristics

}} MV Sparta II is an Russian RoRo container vessel (Rol-on/Roll-off) with a double-hull, built in 2000. It is owned and operated by Oboronlogistics, a transport company that operates under the Russian Federation’s Ministry of Defence.

The ship was damaged and a fire broke on November 21st, 2026 in the Gulf of Finland. According to media reports, Sparta 2 was attacked by two UAVs.

== Ship ==
Airal photo from 2015: Sparta II in Neustadts harbour of Bremen, Germany

The U.S. government sanctioned Sparta 2, linking the ship to the shipping company Oboronlogistika, which translates roughly to "defense logistics." The U.S. Department of State describes it as a shipping line belonging to the Russian Ministry of Defense.

Homeport of the 121 meter, 7450 dw RoRo ship is Noworossijsk, Russia.

== Operational history ==
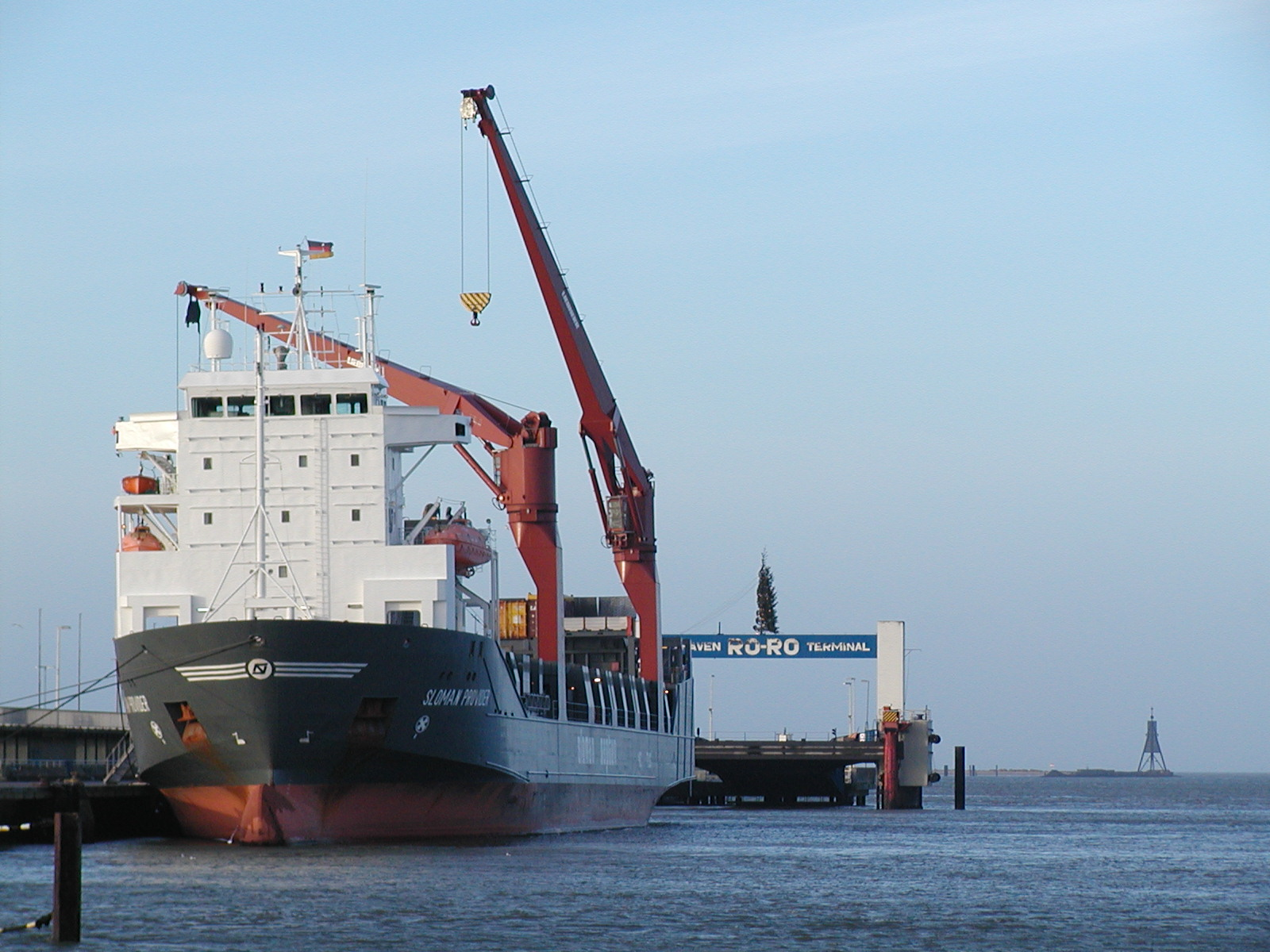
The ship as Sloman Provider at Kugelbake, Cuxhaven, Germany in 2004

The keel of Sparta II was laid on June 29, 1998, by the Pendik shipyard in Istanbul, and she was launched on June 27, 2000. The cargo ship was built with two continuous decks and six watertight bulkheads.

The ship was until September 2016 owend and operated under the name Sloman Provider, most recently flying the flag of Antigua and Barbuda by Bremen shipping company Sloman Neptun. Following its acquisition by the Russian company Oboronlogistika, it was renamed Sparta II and placed under the Russian flag.

The United States announced sanctions against the Sparta II in early May 2022 over two months after Russia launched its full-scale invasion of Ukraine. Ukraine followed in sanctioning the ship in 2026.

=== "Syria express" ===
Sparta II was one of the main ships of so called Syrian Express. During the Russian military intervention in the Syrian Civil War, the ship regularly transported ammunition, vehicles, containers, and heavy military equipment from Russia to Russian Tartus Naval base to supply Russian forces and the Assad regime. Its design as RoRo cargo ship allowed for the rapid loading and unloading of both standard containers and heavy wheeled or tracked vehicles via ramps.

Since the Sparta II was sailing under a civilian merchant flag, it was not subject to the strict restrictions of the Montreux Convention from 1936 during its passage through the Bosphorus and the Dardanelles as were the dedicated warships of the Russian Navy.

Following the start of the full-scale Russian invasion of Ukraine, the direction of transport was, in some instances, reversed. In August 2022, the vessel was documentedtransporting S-300 air defense systems from Syria, through the Turkish Straits, to the Russian port of Novorossiysk, for use in the war against Ukraine.

=== Baltic Sea shuttling ===
According to Oboronlogistika company, Sparta 2 has been shuttling between St. Petersburg and Kaliningrad since October 2022. By November 2023, it had transported more than 150,000 tons of cargo along this route, including 1,300 pieces of equipment.

After the collapse of the Assad regime in late 2024, the Sparta II was ordered from the Baltic Sea to the Mediterranean again once more. The ship porpuse was to evacuate and relocate Russian military equipment and troop contingents from the port of Tartus. The ship was relocating some of these assets toward Libya.

Later the ship returned to the Baltic Sea.

=== UAV incident ===
Aerial picture of the seascape of the island of Gogland where the Sparta II droen incident happened on November 20, 2026

On November 21st, 2026 the ship was on a route from Saint Petersburg to Kaliningrad in the Baltic Sea. At a sea position west of the island of Gogland in the eastern part of Gulf of Finland in international waters at about 08:50 local time (06:50 UTC) the ship was attacked by two UAV and caught fire. The attack took place at a seaposition in international waters, 3 sm from the russian border, 50 km west of Hogland and approximately 11 sm north of the island of Stenskär (Vaindloo). According to shipping company Drozdenko, 80 drones were shot down over the Leningrad region in the night from November 20 to November 21st.

Russian state agency TASS claimed the Sparta II was carrying "paints and varnishes," whereas the Finnish Coast Guard stated the true contents of its containers remain unknown.

According to the Estonian Police and Border Guard Board (PPA), explosions which rocked the vessel took place when it was in Estonia's EEZ. It had been alerted to the attack at around 08:50 local time (06:50 UTC) on Saturday and that the cargo vessel had been located approximately 50km west of the island of Gogland (Finnish Suursaari). In shipping lanes it was open to international vessels, with the vessel later drifting north into Finnish waters.

Finnish Border Guard was leading the rescue operation and spill preparation. After the incident, temporary restrictions were imposed on maritime and air traffic in the east of the Gulf of Finnland in the event of any new attacks. The border guard was coordinating maritime rescue with domestic and international authorities.

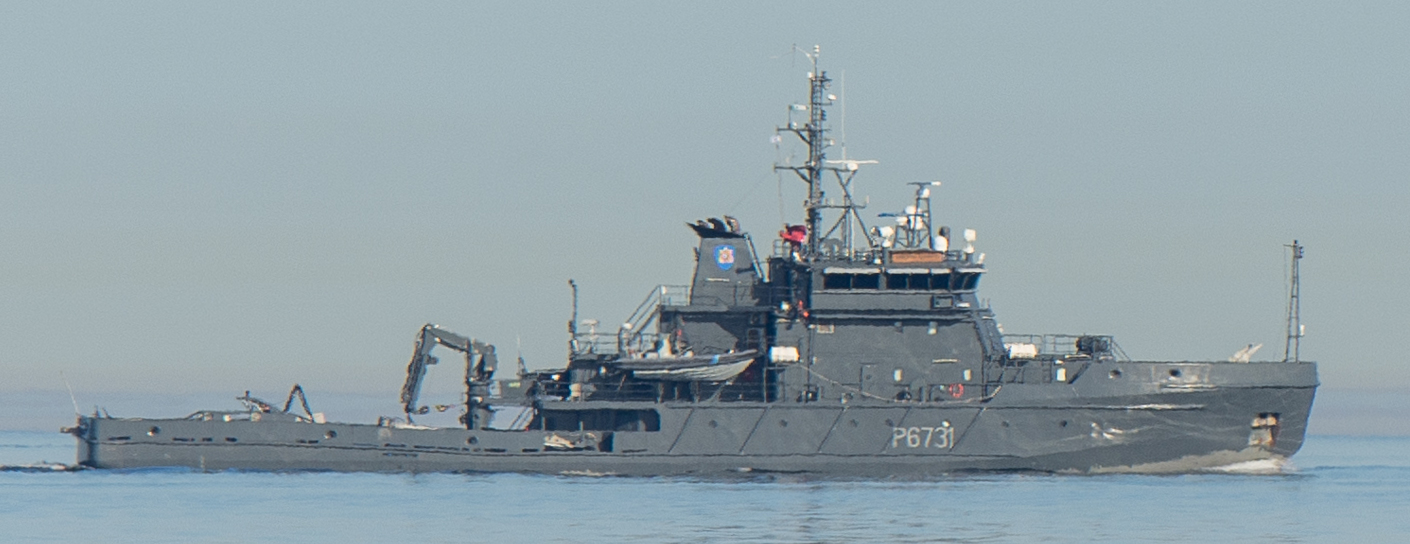
Estonian Rescue Ship EML Kindral Kurvits in 2024

According to Finland, the ship was on fire, drifted from international waters into Finnish territorial waters in the eastern Gulf of Finland. The situation poses no danger to other shipping, according to Finnish Border Guard. On the evening the ship was drifting close to the city of Loviisa. Rescue ships douse the ship till the next day with water. Finland had the patrol boat Uisko and the two tugboats Ajax and H. Kanter (both tugboats from Alfons Håkans), Estonian the EML Kindral Kurvits and Russia the Murman (IMO 9682423) and Spasatel Karev involved in recovery work.

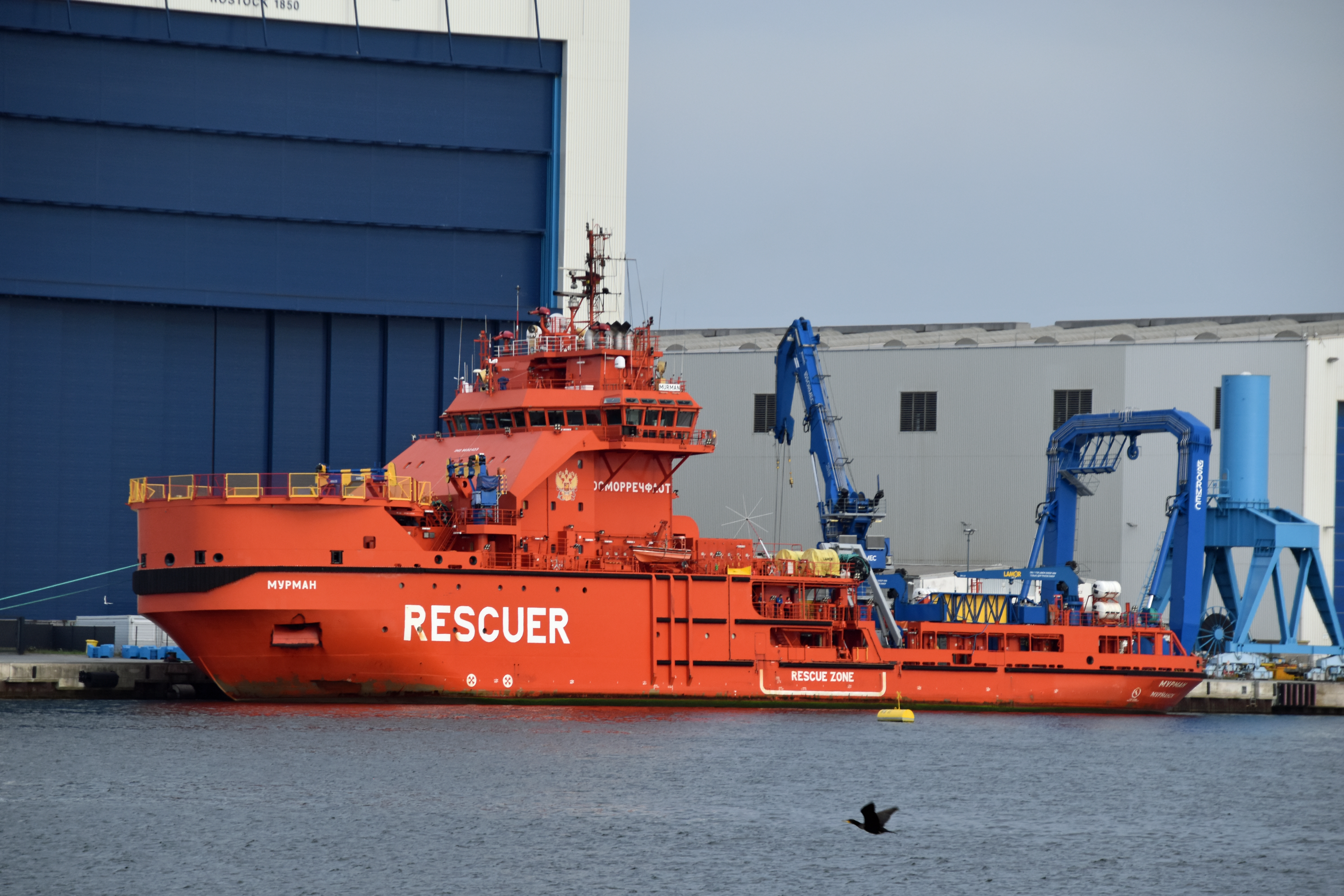
Russian Rescue ship Murman 2021 in Rostock

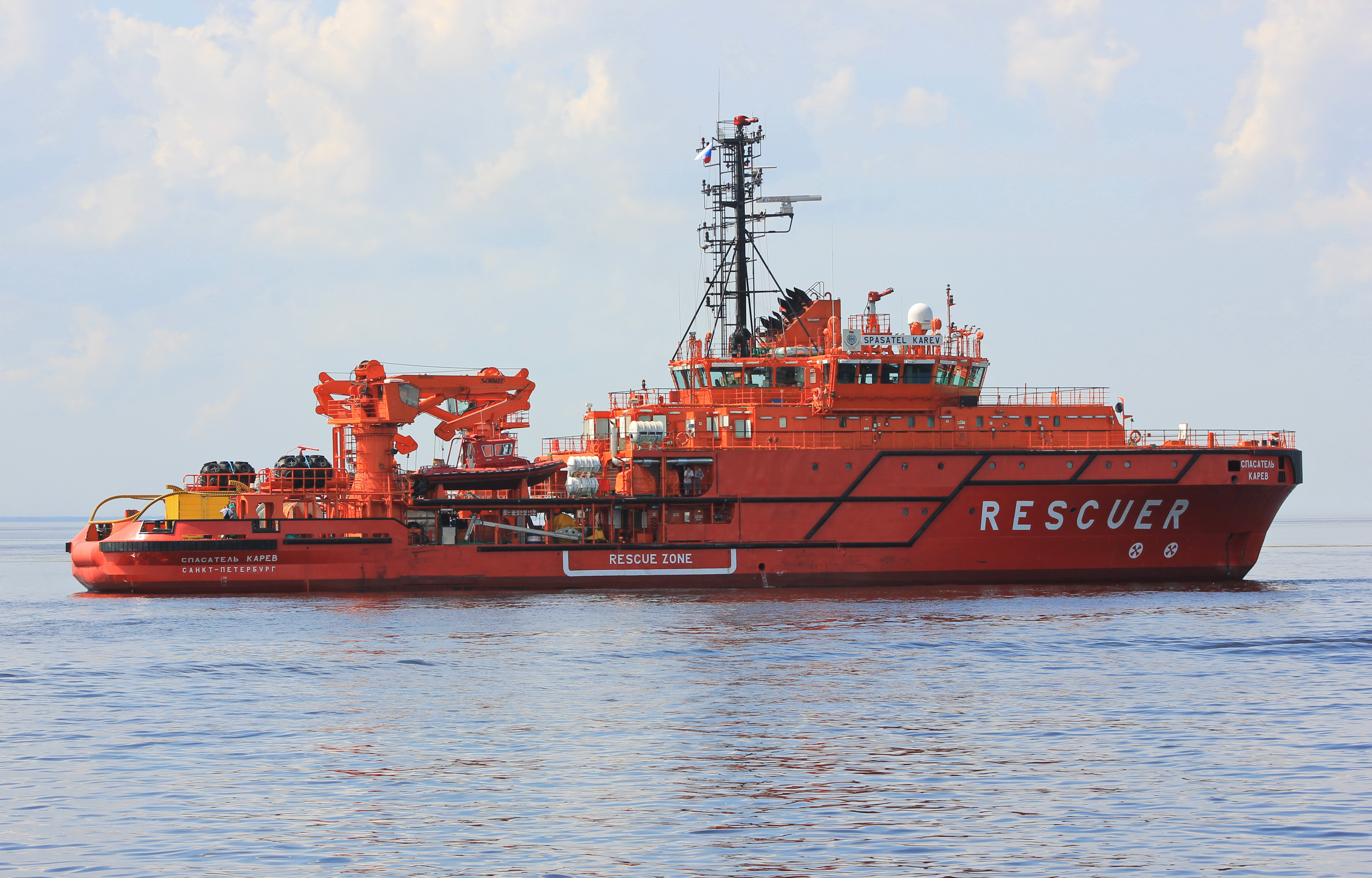
Russian Rescue Boat Spasatel Karev in 2013

The Russian rescue vessel Murman (IMO 9682423) approached the ship and was told by the Sparta II crew that they did not need to be evacuated, according to Kaliningrad's governor. According to Finnish Border Guard, the Sparta II-crew of 16 seamens had entered rafts and were rescued by another Russian merchant ship that was already en route to Russia. The Russian rescue vessel Murman and Spasatel Karev (IMO 9497531) had remained at the location of the stricken cargo vessel.

According to Finland's defence ministry Antti Häkkänen, a Russian helicopter was also suspected of violating Finnish airspace on 20 November afternoon, off the coast of Loviisa.

According to Finnland, Russia planned to tow the vessel into Russian waters, while Estonia reported the ship could not use its own engines. On the evening of the 22 November, the Murman began towing the distressed vessel out of Finnish territorial waters.

==== Investigations ====
Finnish and Estonian authorities are investigating the incident. A spokesperson of the Finnish armed forces said the attack was likely from Ukraine.

Since the event took place more than 1,000 kilometers away from Ukraine, the only plausible Ukrainian-origin assets would be one-way attack UAVs or systems launched from a shorter distance from covert launch sites or from vessels in the Baltic Sea. A view weeks earlyer the Russian corvette Naro-Fominsk was attacked by Ukrainian UAVs in Russian waters close to the Gulf of Finnland.

==== Reactions ====
Finland informed NATO and other allies of the situation with Sparta II, while Sweden and others Nordic countries said, they were closely monitoring the developing situation.

The Sparta II incident occurred in a situation of growing pressure on Russian port infrastructures in the Baltic Sea, which is key for oil, energy products, and grain exports. An earlier UAV attack was carried out on 11. November 2025 against the Ust-Luga port complex, which caused a fire and damage to its energy facilities.

Finland's prime minister Petteri Orpo (Kok) confirmed Sparta 2 had been hit by drones, adding Ukraine has the "right to fight back" against the aggressor. "War is spilling over into our immediate vicinity," he said.

The governor of Russia's Leningrad Oblast Aleksandr Drozdenko, said the vessel had been attacked by two drones.
