= Oboronlogistika =

Russian state-owned shipping and military logistics company

Oboronlogistics is the logistics service provider for the Russian Ministry of Defence. This Russian state-owned enterprise operates roll-on/roll-off (RoRo) vessels, tugboats, specialized ships, and ferries.

The company was founded in 2011. Because of the involment in Russian military operations nearly all ships are sanctioned by the US, the EU and a number of other countries.

== History ==
The company was founded in 2011. Up from 2015 Oboronlogistika was under the Military-Construction Complex to handle large-scale multimodal freight, warehousing, and project cargo for both military and civilian clients including Roscosmos (state space company) and Rosoboronexport (state defence import/export company).

Form the early days it was a heavy ship supplyer for the Syrian Express convois. Up from 2018 it secured specialized customs procedures at the Port of Novorossiysk to support Mediterranean shipping. Following Turkey's 2022 restrictions on military vessels passing through the Bosporus under the Montreux Convention, the company civilian-flagged cargo ships got more important, to transport supplies and military equipment between Syria and Russia.

In 2024, Ursa Major the companys flag ship sank in the western Mediterranean, with the loss of two of her sixteen crew. At the time of the sinking, the ship transported nuclear reactors potentialy for North Korean submarines.

On November 21st, 2026 the MV Sparta II was damaged and a fire broke out at a sea position in the Gulf of Finland. According to media reports, Sparta 2 was attacked by two potential Ukrainian UAVs.

== Fleet ==
Oboronlogistics has a fleet of RoRo ships and other shhips. When necessary, the company charters civilian merchant vessels for specific transport assignments.

=== Universal Cargo Ships (RoRo / LoLo) ===
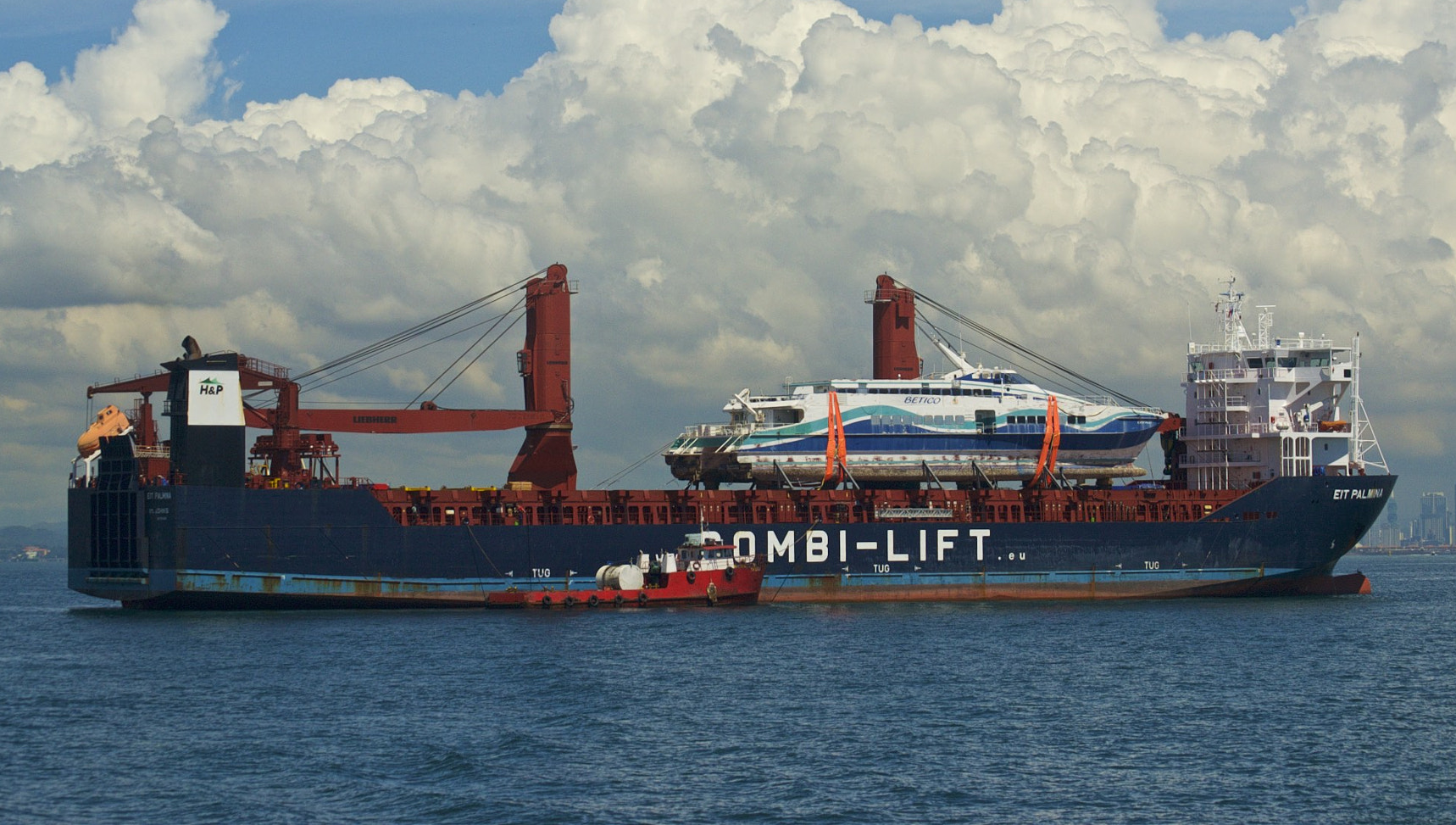
- Ursa Major in 2016
  Sparta, a multi-purpose cargo ship (Roll-on/Roll-off and Lift-on/Lift-off)
- Sparta 2, a sister ship to the Sparta (IMO 9160994), which has been deployed on routes including those between St. Petersburg/Ust-Luga and Kaliningrad, as well as in the Mediterranean.
- Sparta III, a multi-purpose cargo ship of the Sparta class.
- Sparta IV, a bulk and general cargo carrier, which has been used for purposes including military and specialized transport in the Black Sea and the Mediterranean.
- Ursa Major, is the company’s former flagship and largest heavy-lift cargo vessel. The ship sank while en route to Vladivostok.
- Pizhma, is a dry-cargo vessel regularly used for supply voyages.

=== Railway and vehicle ferries ===
- Ambal is a large railway ferry that operates primarily on the strategically important Baltic Sea route between Ust-Luga and Baltiysk (Kaliningrad Oblast).
- Maria E and Lavrentios, are a ferry and a transport vessel that, according to sanctions lists, are linked to Oboronlogistika and its logistics network.
