= Russian landing ship Aleksandr Otrakovsky =

Russian Navy landing ship

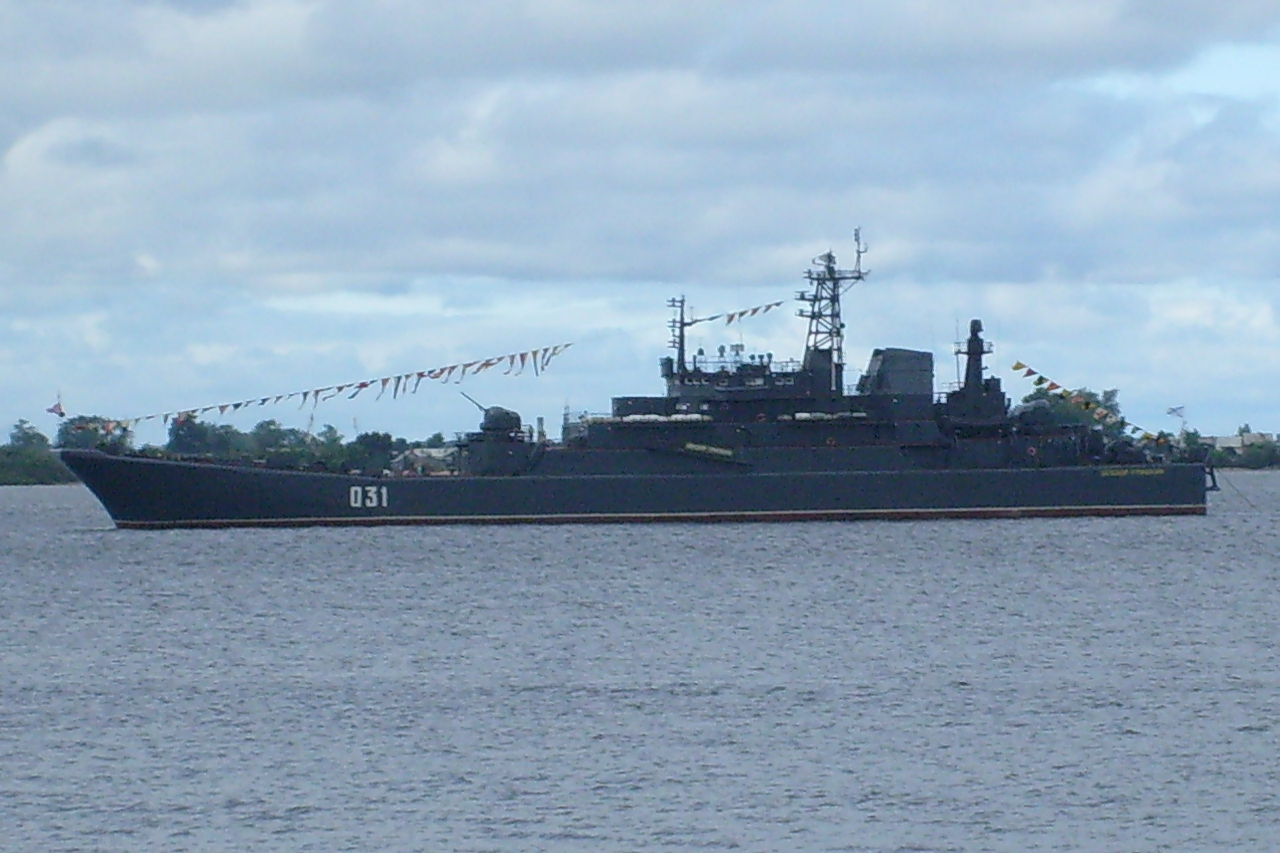

History

Russia
- Name: SDK-55 (1977); BDK-55 (1977-2001); Aleksandr Otrakovsky (2001-present)
- Namesake: Aleksandr Otrakovsky
- Builder: Stocznia Północna, Gdańsk, Poland
- Laid down: August 1977
- Launched: 3 December 1977
- Commissioned: 30 July 1978
- Home port: Severomorsk
- Identification: Hull number: 029 (1979–1981); 033 (1981–1985); 036 (1985); 050 (1985–1986); 037 (1986–1987); 040 (1987–1990); 014 (1990–1996; 031 (1996–present)
- Status: In service

General characteristics
- Class & type: Ropucha-class landing ship
- Displacement: 3,450 t (3,396 long tons) standard; 4,080 t (4,016 long tons) full load
- Length: 112.5 m (369 ft 1 in)
- Beam: 15.01 m (49 ft 3 in)
- Draught: 4.26 m (14 ft 0 in)
- Ramps: Over bows and at stern
- Installed power: 3 × 750 kW (1,006 hp) diesel generators
- Propulsion: 2 × 9,600 hp (7,159 kW) Zgoda-Sulzer 16ZVB40/48 diesel engines
- Speed: 18 knots (33 km/h; 21 mph)
- Range: 6,000 nmi (11,000 km; 6,900 mi) at 12 knots (22 km/h; 14 mph); 3,500 nmi (6,500 km; 4,000 mi) at 16 knots (30 km/h; 18 mph)
- Endurance: 30 days
- Capacity: 10 × main battle tanks and 340 troops or 12 × BTR APC and 340 troops or 3 × main battle tanks, 3 × 2S9 Nona-S SPG, 5 × MT-LB APC, 4 trucks and 313 troops or 500 tons of cargo
- Complement: 98
- Armament: 2 × AK-725 twin 57 mm (2.2 in) DP guns; 4 × 8 Strela 2 SAM launchers; 2 × 22 A-215 Grad-M rocket launchers

Aleksandr Otrakovsky (Russian: Александр Отраковский) is a Ropucha-class landing ship of the Russian Navy and part of the Northern Fleet.

Named after Major-General Aleksandr Otrakovsky, a posthumous Hero of the Russian Federation who died in 2000 during the Second Chechen War, the ship was built in Poland and launched in 1977. She was named SDK-55 (Russian: СДК-58) for Russian: Средний десантный корабль, romanized: Sredny desantnyi korabl', lit. 'medium landing ship', during construction, before being named BDK-55 (Russian: БДК-58) for Russian: Большой десантный корабль, romanized: Bolshoy desantnyi korabl', lit. 'large landing ship', and then renamed Aleksandr Otrakovsky in 2001. She is one of the first subtype of the Ropucha-class landing ships, designated Project 775 by the Russian Navy.

== Construction and commissioning ==
Aleksandr Otrakovsky was ordered, and then laid down in August 1977 as SDK-55, before the entire class was recategorised as large landing ships later in 1977, and SDK-55 became BDK-55. She was built by Stocznia Północna, part of Gdańsk Shipyard, in Gdańsk, in what was then the Polish People's Republic, and launched on 3 December 1977. Commissioned into the Soviet Navy on 30 July 1978 as part of its Northern Fleet, she was homeported in Severomorsk. With the dissolution of the Soviet Union in late December 1991, she went on to serve in the Russian Navy.

== Career ==
=== Early years ===
Spending much of her earlier career named BDK-55, she was renamed Aleksandr Otrakovsky on 9 May 2001, marking Victory Day, and commemorating Major-General and posthumous Hero of the Russian Federation Aleksandr Otrakovsky, the chief of the Northern Fleet's Coastal Troops, who had been killed in action during the Second Chechen War the previous year.

Aleksandr Otrakovsky took part in Arkhangelsk's Navy Day naval parade on 27 July 2008. In 2009, she took part in the Ladoga 2009 and Zapad 2009 exercises. Between 10 July and 29 August 2012, she was deployed on joint exercises with ships from the Baltic, Black Sea and Northern Fleets in the Barents, Norwegian and North Seas, the Atlantic Ocean, and the Mediterranean Sea, directed by Rear-Admiral Vladimir Kasatonov, commander of the Kola Flotilla. She came under scrutiny in July 2013, when following a refit at the 35th Ship Repair Plant, naval investigators alleged counterfeit materials had been used in the work, potentially threatening the ship's safety. The plant contested the allegations, and on 2 July 2013 a criminal case was opened under Part 3 of Article 159 of the Russian Criminal Code. In the meantime Northern Fleet command restricted Aleksandr Otrakovsky's operations.

=== 2014–2020 ===
In November 2014, she was considered suitable for a long-range deployment, being dispatched to the Mediterranean to join the permanent task force there. On 18 May 2015 she was part of Maritime Interaction 2015, joint exercises with the People's Liberation Army Navy consisting of Aleksandr Otrakovsky and her sister ship Aleksandr Shabalin, the cruiser Moskva, the corvette Samum, the frigate Ladny, and the ocean-going tug MB-31. The Chinese contingent consisted of the frigates Linyi and Weifang, and the supply ship Weishanhu.

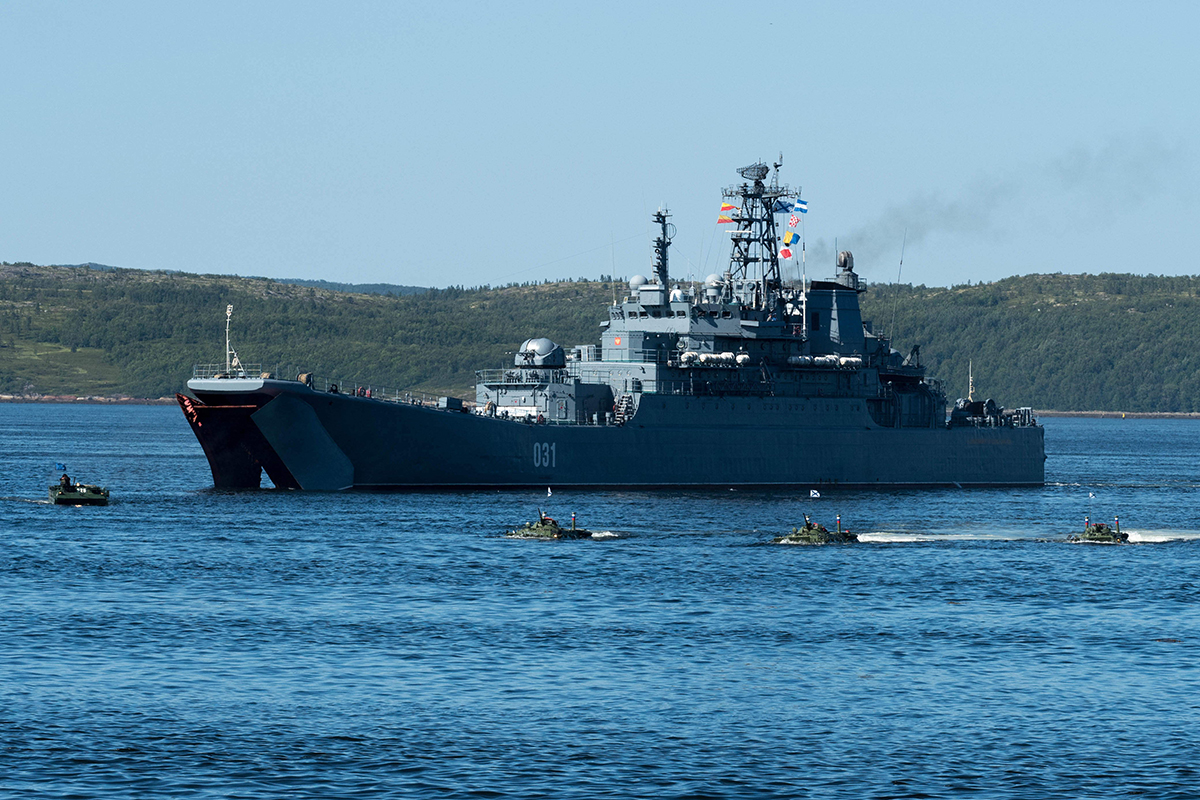
Aleksandr Otrakovsky carrying out landing operation demonstrations on Navy Day, 29 July 2016

By June 2015, she was operating between Black Sea Fleet bases and the Russian naval facility in Tartus. She entered the Mediterranean Sea in April 2016, beginning her return to the Northern Fleet, and returned to her home port of Severomorsk on 30 June 2016. Between leaving the fleet on 20 November 2014, and returning on 30 June 2016, she covered 65,0000 nautical miles over 588 days, setting a record for the Northern Fleet of longest voyage of a surface ship from her permanent base.

On 25 May 2017, Aleksandr Otrakovsky took part in exercises with the Northern Fleet in the Barents Sea. On 10 August 2017, she was again at sea, sailing with a detachment of the Northern Fleet led by the Udaloy-class destroyer Severomorsk to the eastern Arctic Ocean. The detachment carried out joint exercises simulating the defence of an industrial facility on the Taymyr Peninsula, before Aleksandr Otrakovsky and her sister ship Georgy Pobedonosets deployed independently from the detachment on 5 September. They carried out a landing operation on Novaya Zemlya, returning to base on 13 September.

On 12 September 2017, Aleksandr Otrakovsky again deployed to the Mediterranean for service with the permanent task force there. She left the Mediterranean in February 2018, and returned to her home part on 5 March 2018. On 14 June 2018, Aleksandr Otrakovsky deployed with 35 other vessels of the Northern Fleet for the largest Northern Fleet exercises in ten years. She took part in further exercises during 2019, and into 2020.

=== 2020–present ===
In September 2020, Aleksandr Otrakovsky collected 70 tons of scrap metal from Kildin Island and transported it to the mainland for disposal. She took part in naval exercises and training voyages with other Northern Fleet ships during 2021, 2022 and 2023.

In April 2024, Aleksandr Otrakovsky, the Ivan Gren-class Ivan Gren and the tanker Kola sailed to the Libyan port of Tobruk, delivering equipment for the Africa Corps deployment in the south of the country. The ships unloaded light and heavy vehicles such as pickups, GAZ and KAMAZ trucks, and ZU-23-2 anti-aircraft weaponry. The ships were monitored by ships of the Portuguese and Spanish Navies during their transit of their waters.

In December 2024, Aleksandr Otrakovsky and Ivan Gren were dispatched to the Russian naval installation at Tartus, Syria, to begin removing equipment following the Fall of the Assad regime, and transporting it to Libya. By mid-February the Aleksandr Otrakovsky and Ivan Gren were returning to the Baltic Sea, accompanied by merchant vessels used in the evacuation of Tartus, the MV Sparta, MV Sparta II, MT General Skobelev and the oiler MT Yelnya. They were shadowed during their passage through the English Channel by the Royal Navy vessels HMS Iron Duke, HMS Tyne, RFA Tideforce, and a Wildcat helicopter from 815 Naval Air Squadron. As of early 2026, Aleksandr Otrakovsky was reported visiting the port of Malabo in Equatorial Guinea.
