= Aleksandr Shabalin =

Russian Soviet Navy

Aleksandr Osipovich Shabalin
- Александр Осипович Шабалин
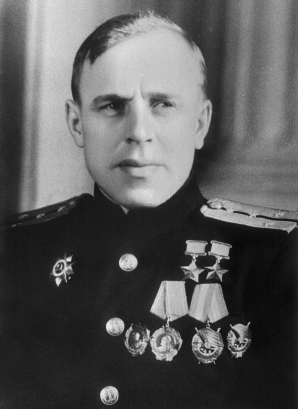
- Born: 4 November [O.S. 22 October] 1914; Yudmozero, Arkhangelsk Governorate, Russian Empire
- Died: 16 January 1982 (aged 67); Leningrad, USSR
- Spouse: Varvara Grigoryevna
- Military career
- Allegiance: Soviet Union
- Branch: Soviet Navy
- Service years: 1936 – 1975
- Rank: Counter admiral
- Conflicts: World War II; Winter War; Eastern Front
- Awards: Hero of the Soviet Union (twice)

Aleksandr Osipovich Shabalin (Russian: Александр Осипович Шабалин; 4 November [O.S. 22 October] 1914 – 16 January 1982) was a Russian Soviet Navy and torpedo boat commander who was twice awarded the title Hero of the Soviet Union during World War II. After the war he attained the rank of counter-admiral.

== Early life ==
Shabalin was born on 4 November [O.S. 22 October] 1914 to a Russian peasant family in the rural village of Yudmozero. After completing secondary school, he began working on a fishing trawler in Murmansk in 1930. Later he graduated from courses at the local technical school in 1935 and worked as a navigator until 1936 when he entered the navy. Initially posted to the Baltic Fleet, he was transferred as a foreman 2nd rank to the Northern Fleet in 1938 after undergoing training. In May the next year he was put in command of a torpedo boat, and later that year he entered the Winter War. In 1943 he became a member of the Communist Party.

== World War II ==
In August 1941 Shabalin, at the time a junior lieutenant, was placed in command of TKA-12, a D3-class motor torpedo boat of the 1st Separate Torpedo Boat Division. In that capacity he was tasked with guarding an area near the main base of the Northern Fleet, where he made his first attack on an enemy vessel in September 1941. He went on to sink a submarine, six vessels, and shoot down a plane by the start of 1944 for which he was awarded the title Hero of the Soviet Union on 22 February 1944. In May 1944 he was promoted to being a detachment commander within his unit. During the Petsamo-Kirkenes offensive he twice managed to break through enemy lines to reach the port of Liinahamari for a landing on the night on 13 October 1944, which resulted in the awarding of his second gold star on 5 November. Despite his lack of theoretical military education he nevertheless used well-thought-out tactics, such as gliding toward enemy vessels after turning off the motor to avoid detection before opening fire at close range. On a mission to search a fjord with Viktor Leonov, they captured two German officers, who later provided useful information to headquarters under interrogation. In 1945 he transferred to the Baltic Fleet.

== Postwar ==
After the war he graduated from the Caspian Higher Naval School in 1951, and then from the Voroshilov Naval Academy in 1955, after which he held various high positions. During his tenure at the Frunze Naval Academy he was the deputy head of the mine-torpedo department and head of the seamanship department. In January 1968 he became the deputy chief of staff of command and control in the Northern Fleet, and in February the next year he was promoted to counter-admiral; in August he was made deputy chief of the Frunze Naval Academy. He retired in 1975, after which he lived in Leningrad where he died on 16 January 1982 and was buried in the Serafimovskoe Cemetery. He and his wife Vavara had four children - Gennady, Galina, Raisa, and Natasha. His son was an admiral in the Northern Submarine Fleet. The Ropucha-class landing ship Aleksandr Shabalin was named after Shabalin.

== Awards ==
- Twice Hero of the Soviet Union
- Two Order of Lenin
- Three Order of the Red Banner
- Order of the Patriotic War 2nd class
- Order of the Red Star
- Order "For Service to the Homeland in the Armed Forces of the USSR" 3rd class
- campaign and jubilee medals

== See also ==
- List of twice Heroes of the Soviet Union
