= Tartus naval base =

Installation of the Russian Navy in Syria

720th Material-Technical Support Point of the Russian Navy in Syria
- 720-й ПМТО ВМФ России в Сирии
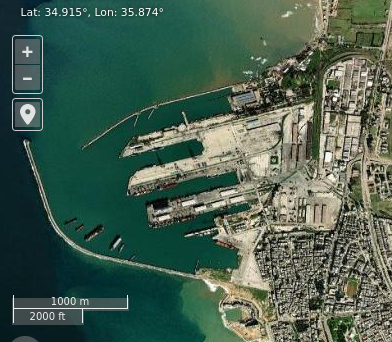
- Satellite imagery of Tartus naval facility

Site information
- Owner: Syria
- Operator: Soviet Union (1971–1991); Commonwealth of Independent States (1991–1992); Russian Federation (1992–present)
- Open to the public: No

Location
- Location within Syria
- Coordinates: 34.915°N 35.875°E

Site history
- Built: 1971

Map of the Tartus Syrian naval base (Russian piers (5) off northern breakwater, most of the balance of facility—numbered buildings—within the dashed line belongs to the Syrian Navy). (Note: As of early 2018 these boundaries are subject to change.)

The Tartus naval base is a military installation of the Russian Navy on the northern edge of the sea port of the city of Tartus in Syria.

Established in 1971, during the Cold War, by an agreement between the Soviet Union and Ba'athist Syria, the facility supported the Soviet Navy's 5th Operational Squadron, its Mediterranean fleet. Tartus naval base served as a key support hub for Russian forces in its backing of the Assad regime during the civil war. Following the regime's fall, the hub was briefly abandoned in 2025, but it is now fully operational again, following an agreement with the new Syrian authorities in power.

== History ==
=== Briev history ===
Tartus is an old mediteeran port city. In 1971, USSR during the Cold War signed an agreement with Ba'athist Syria in building a naval base. The facility supported the Soviet Navy's 5th Operational Squadron, its Mediterranean fleet. After the fall of the Soviet Union, the facility remained in limited use by Russia's Black Sea Fleet. From 2009, the facility was upgraded and expanded, including to serve the Mediterranean Sea Task Force, formed in 2013. From 2011, it was the only remaining Russian naval base outside the former Soviet Union and after 2015, the base supported the Russian intervention in the Syrian civil war. In 2017 Russia concluded an agreement with Syria, obtaining a free-of-charge 49-year lease for its ships based in the Mediterranean and jurisdiction over the base.

In December 2024, following the fall of the Assad regime, the Russian Navy began withdrawing from the base, completing this by early March 2025. The treaty allowing Russian ownership of bases in Syria was described as having been suspended but not terminated, and Russian vessels continued to use the base as a stopover point through 2025, while details of its final status remained unclear. In mid-2026 it was reported that there were no major Russian warships currently in the Mediterranean. In August 2026 it was announced that an agreement had been signed between Russia and Syria governing future Russian use of the bases.

=== 1971 to 2012 ===
The Soviet Union established a facility at Tartus during the Cold War in accordance with a Soviet–Syrian agreement concluded in 1971, with a view of supporting the Soviet Navy's 5th Operational Squadron in the Mediterranean, which the Soviets saw as a counterbalance to the U.S. Sixth Fleet headquartered in Italy (then in Gaeta).

In the early 1970s, the Soviet Navy had similar support points located in Egypt, Ethiopia (Eritrea), Vietnam and elsewhere. In 1977, the Soviet Navy evacuated its Egyptian support bases at Alexandria and Mersa Matruh and transferred the ships and property to Tartus, where it transformed the naval support facility into the 229th Naval and Estuary Vessel Support Division.

In 1984, Moscow upgraded the Tartus support point to the 720th Material-Technical Support Point.

In December 1991, the Soviet Union dissolved; the Soviet Mediterranean 5th Operational Squadron (composed of ships from the Northern Fleet, the Baltic Fleet, and the Black Sea Fleet) ceased to exist in December 1992. Since then, the Russian Navy has occasionally deployed ships and submarines to the Mediterranean Sea.

As Russia wrote off 73% of Syria's $13.4 billion Soviet-era debt in 2005 and became Syria's main arms supplier, Russia and Syria held talks about allowing Russia to develop and enlarge its naval facility, so that Russia could strengthen its naval presence in the Mediterranean.

In September 2008, a second floating pier was built at the facility, following the discussion of the issue between the presidents of Russia and Syria in August. Meanwhile, mass media and officials of Russia, Israel, and Syria made contradictory statements about Russian warships planning to call at Tartus as well as about the prospects of upgrading the facility to a naval base.

In July 2009, the Russian military announced they would modernize the Tartus facility.

=== During the Syrian Civil War ===
Media reports in March 2012 suggested that Russian special forces had arrived at the Tartus port. According to a TASS report published in December 2017, the Tartus facility has been used for supplies of Russian armaments and military cargo since June 2012. Back in June 2012, Russian officials denied reports that they were reinforcing the garrison at Tartus with marines. In 2012, the BBC reported that up to 50 Russian sailors were stationed there then.

On 3 August 2012, international media reported that three large Russian amphibious assault ships, carrying hundreds of marines would soon visit Tartus. Earlier reports, quoting a source at the Russian General Staff, said the ships would spend a few days in Tartus and would take on fresh supplies of food and water. British media added that the ships each had up to 120 marines on board. The Russian Defence Ministry left open the possibility that the ships might dock there at some point for logistical reasons, saying they had every right to do so. The unnamed General Staff source had said that after calling in at Tartus, they would head for the Bosphorus and the Russian Black Sea port of Novorossiysk. The ships, part of Russia's Northern Fleet, were Aleksandr Otrakovsky, Georgy Pobedonosets and Kondopoga, all Ropucha-class landing ships. The source, quoted by Interfax news agency, said one would anchor off Tartus and the other two would use a floating pier, because the port facilities were limited. There was speculation that Russia may begin evacuating its nationals from Syria and deploy Marines to protect personnel and equipment, as the violence intensifies (about 30,000 Russian citizens were said to be living in Syria).

In May 2013, a U.S. newspaper reported that Russia had sent a dozen or more warships to patrol waters near Tartus, a move that was seen as a warning to the U.S. and Israel not to intervene in the conflict in Syria.

At the end of June 2013, Russian deputy foreign minister Mikhail Bogdanov said in an interview that the facility did not have any strategic or military importance and that Russia had evacuated all civilian and military personnel from Tartus and Syria ("Presently, the Russian Defense Ministry has not a single person stationed in Syria"). This information was then confirmed by the Russian Defense Ministry.

After the permanent Mediterranean Sea Task Force of the Russian Navy was formed in September 2013, the facility at Tartus was charged with servicing and repairs of the ships of that formation.

On 18 January 2017, Russia and Syria signed an agreement, effective forthwith, wherein Russia would be allowed to expand and use the naval facility at Tartus for 49 years on a free-of-charge basis and enjoy sovereign jurisdiction over the base. The treaty allows Russia to keep up to 11 ships at Tartus, including nuclear-powered vessels; it stipulates privileges and full immunity from Syria's jurisdiction for Russia's personnel and materiel at the facility. The treaty was ratified and approved by Russian parliament, and the relevant federal law was signed by president Vladimir Putin by the end of December 2017.

In late December 2017, Russia announced it had set about "forming a permanent grouping" at the Tartus naval facility as well as at the Khmeimim Air Base, after president Putin approved the structure and the personnel strength of the Tartus and Khmeimim facilities.

The Russian facility at Tartus has been used for delivering armaments and supplies by Russian dock landing ships and cargo ships that pass the Straits from the Russian Black Sea port in Novorossiysk to Syria (the Syrian Express) — for the Russian intervention in the Syrian Civil War that began on 30 September 2015 as well as for the Syrian Arab Army. According to media reports in September 2015, a drastic intensification of traffic of the Syrian Express was noted since mid-August 2015.

In April 2019, senior Russian officials were reported to have had talks with the Syrian government; Russian deputy prime minister Yury Borisov was quoted as saying that a contract on renting the Tartus port by Russia for "use by Russian business" was expected to be signed shortly.

Over the course of its history through the Syrian Civil War, the base usually hosted no more than half a dozen Russian vessels, with its "modest infrastructure" only supporting "light logistical operations", as well as only very limited maintenance work, as it didn't include a shipyard.

=== Fall of Assad government ===
In November 2024, rebels including Hay'at Tahrir al-Sham (HTS) launched a major offensive against the Russian-backed Syrian military and seized the city of Aleppo.

On the morning of 3 December 2024, analysts such as Droxford Maritime saw that a tanker and some warships were leaving Tartus. By the evening, image analysts such as M T Anderson had confirmed the base was now empty. Two Admiral Gorshkov-class frigates, one Admiral Grigorovich-class frigate, one Improved Kilo-class submarine and two auxiliary ships, one of which being the tanker Yelna, had all departed and sailed into the Mediterranean.

On 8 December 2024, the Russian Foreign Ministry said in a statement that Tartus naval base had been put on a state of high alert. Reuters reported that Russian war blogger "Rybar", who is close to Russian Defence Ministry, said "Russia's military presence in the Middle East region hangs by a thread, Russian warships had left Tartus and taken up position off the coast for security reasons, the Hmeimim Air Base had effectively been cut off after rebels took control of a nearby town, Kurdish forces had started to block Russian facilities beyond the Euphrates, and Russian positions at an oil facility in Homs had been blocked."

On 9 December 2024, Kremlin spokesman Dmitry Peskov said communication lines with HTS had been opened to talk about Russia retaining its naval and air bases in Syria.

The former Senior British Military Advisor to US Central Command, Maj. Gen. Chip Chapman, told Times Radio on 9 December 2024 that Russian evacuations from bases across Syria appear to be underway and that small groups of Russian troops are cut off from the main Tartus naval base and trapped.

As of 6 January 2025 the last known Russian submarine in the Mediterranean, the Kilo-class Novorossiysk had exited the Strait of Gibraltar.

On 19 January 2025, Tartus Customs Director Riyad Joudi told Al-Watan that an agreement signed in 2019 with a former subsidiary of Stroytransgaz to redevelop the civilian portion of the Port of Tartus was rescinded by the provisional government. In a statement to Kommersant, Anton Mardasov from the Russian International Affairs Council said he believes that this does not indicate any changes for the naval base itself. On 13 November 2025, DP World commenced operations at the Port of Tartus as part of a 30-year concession agreement.

On 22 January 2025, some reports claimed that the new Syrian government had terminated the treaty allowing for a Russian military base in Tartus. However, it soon became clear that sources were only claiming that Syria had canceled a lease allowing a Russian firm to operate the commercial port of Tartus, while the treaty authorizing the navy base was not affected. A month later, Russian firm STG Engineering would also assert that it was still operating the port, and that it had not been notified of any cancellation of the lease. Meanwhile Russian company Stroytransgaz denied previous reports saying that it was the company in charge of the port, saying that it had no involvement and was unconnected to STG Engineering.

Despite the treaty remaining in force, a Russian evacuation of the base was believed to be imminent, possibly due to its operation being deemed impractical without control of the larger port. On 2 February 2025 all Russian ships previously stationed at Tartus were reported as having left the base.

Although Russian warships no longer berthed at the base, satellite imagery showed a continued naval presence nearby in Syria’s territorial waters. In May 2025, a Maritime Industry analyst wrote that the Russian navy's status at the base was unclear, with Russian warships still visiting, but their apparently limited access suggesting that access was granted on a case-by-case basis without "basing rights". As of 6 June 2025, at least one surface combatant was operating there: a Steregushchiy-class corvette. Port workers subsequently told journalists that the Russian base had been "largely emptied out", while satellite imagery reportedly showed that most of the Russian military's equipment was gone. Later in the year, the status of the base treaty would be described as "suspended – but not terminated – ahead of a probable renegotiation".

On 15 October 2025, at a meeting with Russian president Vladimir Putin, whose government said that the status of Russia's Tartus naval base and Khmeimim Air Base were on the agenda, Syrian president Ahmed al-Sharaa said "we respect all agreements made" with Russia, which journalists interpreted to imply that Syria would allow Russian use of both bases going forward. Four days earlier, it had been reported that Russia began resupplying the Khmeimim airbase with truck convoys traveling from Tartus, doing so at least 5 times during the first half of the month.

As of December 2025, Russian ships traveling through the Mediterranean were reportedly still using the base as a "staging post", while the exact status of the base was seen as yet to be renegotiated. In early 2026, the corvette Stoykiy was reported to be using the facility more regularly, including wharfs previously reserved for the Russian Mediterranean Flotilla. As of June 2026, the frigate Admiral Kasatonov and the replenishment vessel Academic Pashin were reported docked at the facility along with a Grachonok-class and two Raptor-class patrol boats. In mid-2026, it was reported that there were no Russian warships currently in the Mediterranean (though it was unclear if this also applied to the patrol boats reported at Tartus).

=== Joint Base Agreement 2026 ===
In August 2026, the ruling Ahmed al-Sharaa government announced that it had reached an agreement with Russia regarding the continued Russian presence at two military bases in the country. On August 9, the Syrian state-news agency SANA quoted the Foreign Ministry by saying Hmeimim airbase and the Tartus naval base would be developed under new agreements into "joint training and capacity-building centers" in order to safeguard "mutual interests."

== See also ==
- Russian intelligence facility at Tel Al-Hara
- Khmeimim Air Base
- Syrian Express
