= Russian frigate Ladny =

Krivak class frigate

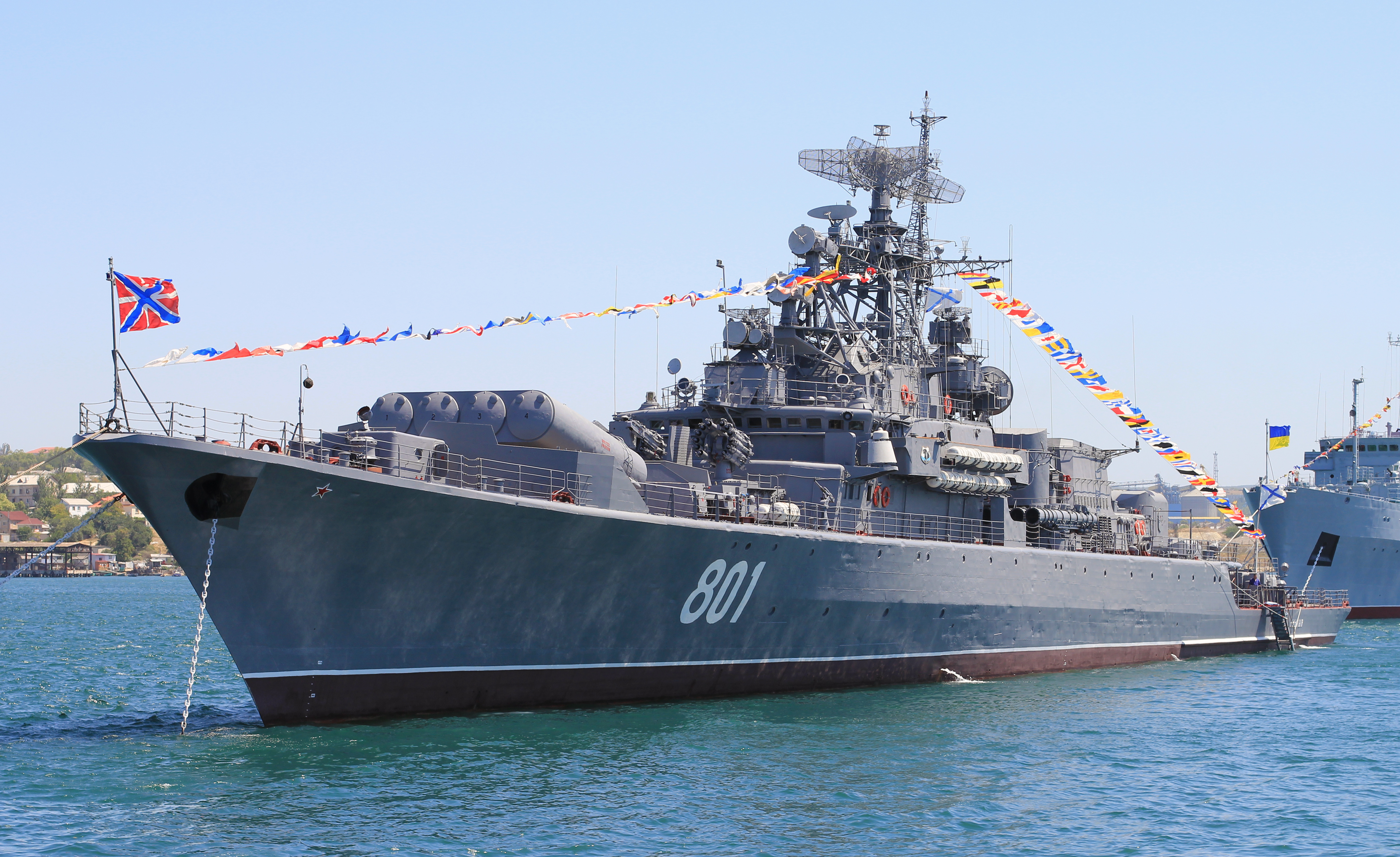
- Ladny in 2012

History

Russia
- Name: Ladny
- Namesake: Russian for "well-built"
- Builder: Zaliv plant, Kerch
- Laid down: 25 May 1979
- Launched: 7 May 1980
- Commissioned: 25 February 1982
- Status: Active, Black Sea Fleet

General characteristics
- Class & type: Krivak-class frigate
- Displacement: 3,420 tons full load
- Length: 405.3 ft (123.5 m)
- Beam: 46.3 ft (14.1 m)
- Draught: 15.1 ft (4.6 m)
- Propulsion: COGAG: 2 x M62 cruise gas turbines, 12,000 hp, 2 M8K boost gas turbines, 36,000 hp, 2 shafts
- Speed: 30 knots
- Range: 3,500 miles
- Complement: 197
- Sensors & processing systems: MR-310U Angara-M/Head Net-C 3-D air search, MGK-332MC Titan-2/Bull Nose hull mounted MF,
- Electronic warfare & decoys: Smerch suite with Bell Shroud intercept, Bell Squat jammer, 2 × towed decoys
- Armament: 4 × URK-5/SS-N-14 Rastrub/Silex SSM/ASW missiles, 2 × Osa-MA-2 SAM systems(SA-N-4 Gecko SAM), 2 × double barreled 76,2 mm AK-726 guns, 4 × 21 inch torpedo tubes,12-16 mines

Ladny (Russian: Ладный, lit. 'well-built') is a Krivak-class missile frigate of the Russian Navy. She also served with its predecessor service, the Soviet Navy.

Ladny was ordered by the Soviet Union in 1978 and was laid down in May 1979. The ship was commissioned in the Soviet Black Sea Fleet in 1981. After the collapse of the Soviet Union in December 1991 the frigate became a part of the Russian Navy. As of 2021 the frigate was active with the Russian Black Sea Fleet.

In July 2015 Ladny took part in Navy Day celebrations in Sevastopol. While Ladny was demonstrating her firepower, one of her SS-N-14 missiles misfired, damaging its launcher, and spiralled out of control before landing harmlessly in the sea.

Repairs were planned to be completed in May 2020, but the ship's commissioning date was later postponed to 2021. On April 7, 2021, it entered the sea combat training range from Sevastopol after completing planned repair work at the ship repair facility. The ship was reported active in 2023 during the initial part of the Russo-Ukraine War.
