= List of military aid to Ukraine during the Russo-Ukrainian war =

Countries delivering military aid to Ukraine Delivered heavy weapons to Ukraine Delivered light weapons or ammunition to Ukraine Delivered non-lethal material military aid to Ukraine Delivered non-material military aid to Ukraine Ukraine

Many entities have provided or promised military aid to Ukraine during the Russo-Ukrainian war, particularly since the 2022 Russian invasion of Ukraine. This includes weaponry, equipment, training, logistical support, as well as financial support, unless earmarked for humanitarian purposes. Weapons sent as a result of cooperation between multiple countries are listed separately under each country.

The aid has mostly been coordinated through the Ukraine Defense Contact Group, whose 57 member countries include all 32 member states of NATO. The European Union co-ordinated weapons supplies through its institutions for the first time. The Russian invasion led several donor countries, including Germany and Sweden, to overturn their national policies on providing offensive military aid.

By March 2024, the majority of Western governments had pledged more than $380 billion worth of aid to Ukraine since the invasion, including nearly $118 billion in direct military aid from individual countries. As of December 2024, European countries have provided €132 billion in aid (military, financial, and humanitarian), and the United States has provided €114 billion. Most of the US funding supports American industries that produce weapons and military equipment.

Fearing escalation, NATO states have hesitated to provide heavier and more advanced weapons to Ukraine or have imposed limits such as forbidding Ukraine from using them to strike inside Russia. Since June 2024, they have lifted some of these restrictions, allowing Ukraine to strike Russian military targets near the border in self-defence.

According to defence expert Malcolm Chalmers, at the beginning of 2025, the US provided 20% of all military equipment Ukraine was using, with 25% supplied by Europe and 55% produced by Ukraine. However, the 20% provided by the US "is the most lethal and important." The donation of military aid was coordinated at monthly meetings in the Ukraine Defense Contact Group throughout the war. A first meeting took place between 41 countries on 26 April 2022, and the coalition comprised 54 countries (all 30 member states of NATO and 24 other countries) at the latest meeting on 14 February 2023. All EU member states collectively donated military aid via EU institutions; all but three (Hungary, Cyprus, and Malta) also donated individually as sovereign countries.

As of February 2023, military aid was donated by EU institutions, 45 sovereign countries, companies, and other parties.

== Sovereign countries ==
Country	Military aid
Albania	Armoured fighting vehicles: 22 International M1224 MaxxPros [before July 2023].; Vehicles: Two ambulances (Mercedes-Benz L 508Ds) for the needs of the armed forces [March 2023].; Ammunition: 7.62mm small arms ammunition [February or March 2022].; 60mm Type 63 mortar bombs [before May 2022].; 82mm mortar bombs [Since 2022].; Different types of ammunition [February or March 2022].; Training: Training of Ukrainian soldiers as part of British-led Operation Interflex; Financial aid: €1 million provided to the Ukrainian government on 10 June 2022.; Unspecified contribution to the purchase of American weapons for Ukraine.
Argentina	Fighter jets: 5 Dassault-Breguet Super Étendard strike fighters [to be delivered].; Helicopters: 2 Mi-171E [February 2024]
Australia	As of December 2025, Australia's military support to Ukraine was worth over AU$1.5 billion in monetary terms. Armoured fighting vehicles: 49 M1A1 Abrams tanks [delivered from July 2025].; 56 M113AS4 APCs [delivered from June 2022 onwards. 28 more pledged in June 2023].; 120 Bushmaster Protected Mobility Vehicles [delivered from April 2022 onwards].; Vehicles: 14 Supacat HMT Extenda MK2 special operations vehicles [June 2023].; 28 armoured RMMV HX 40M military trucks with 14 trailers [June 2023].; Watercraft: Sentinel 830R rigid hull inflatable boats [announced April 2024].; 14 rigid hull inflatable boats valued at A$14 million [announced November 2024].; Artillery: 6 155mm M777 [April 2022].; Man-portable air defence systems: RBS 70 [announced in April 2024]; Ammunition: Joint manufacture of 155mm artillery ammunition with France with Australia supplying the gunpowder [January 2023].; 105mm artillery ammunition [2022/2023].; "Ammunition" [March or April 2022].; JDAM-ER guided bombs.; Air defence missiles; air-to-ground weapons, including guided weapons; anti-tank weapons; artillery, mortar, cannon, and small arms ammunition [announced in July 2024]; Loitering munitions: 300 DefendTex D40s [August 2022].; Corvo PPDS [Since May or June 2023].; Counter-drone systems: In September 2023, it was announced that 160 Slinger counter-drone systems would be provided to Ukraine by Electro Optic Systems. 110 will be mounted on M113 armoured personnel carriers and 50 integrated onto Practika 4x4 light MRAPs.; Unmanned aerial and unmanned ground systems / Radar systems: Part of Australia's $25 million package [announced in March 2022]. Oryx describes the unspecified systems as reconnaissance unmanned aerial vehicles, while ABC News reported they were radar systems.; Anti tank weapons and small arms: A$70 million worth of lethal military equipment ("including missiles and weapons") [March 2022].; A$26.5 million worth of anti-armour weapons and ammunitions [April 2022].; Small number of Australian Combat Assault Rifles.; Miscellaneous equipment: ''Tactical decoys'' (part of A$25 million) [March 2022].; A$21 million worth of Australian Defence Force (ADF) equipment including ammunition and body armour [March 2022].; A$43 million of ADF equipment including combat engineering equipment, air defence radars and munitions [December 2025].; Demining equipment.; Portable X-ray machines; A 3D metal printer; Counter UAV systems; Combat helmets, boots, fire masks, generators; Training (Operation Kudu): Training of Ukrainian soldiers by Australian instructors in the UK as part of Operation Interflex from January 2023 to mid-2026. In 2024, the number of instructors increased from 70 to 90.; Training of Ukrainian soldiers by Australian instructors in Poland as part of Operation Legio [from mid-2026 onwards].; Airborne early warning and control aircraft: One Royal Australian Air Force E-7A Wedgetail aircraft will be based in Germany for approximately six months from October 2023 to provide early warning in the event of any threats outside of Ukraine.; Financial aid: A$24 million contribution to a NATO trust fund [February 2022]; An additional A$2 million to the Latvian led Drone Capability Coalition [December 2025].; A$50 million grant to the International Fund for Ukraine for the purchase of military equipment [February 2024].; A$150 million to the purchase of American weapons for Ukraine.
Austria	Military gear: 10,059 helmets.; 9,300 flak jackets [March 2022].; Logistics: Austria has allowed its territory to be used for transport of weapons to Ukraine by other countries.; Financial aid: 2 million euro for the purchase of demining equipment for Ukraine.
Azerbaijan	Mortars: 20N5 82mm mortars (possibly transferred to Ukraine via Sudan) [June 2022].; Ammunition: QFAB-250 LG aerial bombs (allegedly transferred via Sudan) [August 2022].; 40M11 HE-frag 120mm mortar bombs [February 2023].; 40M10 HE 82mm mortar bombs [August 2023].; Technical equipment: Azerbaijan-made "Revival P" mine-clearing vehicle and training in demining [November 2023].
Belgium	Armoured fighting vehicles: 80 Iveco LMVs [delivered since April 2023]. In 2024, deliveries increased by 300 more.; 40 M113 Armoured Personnel Carriers [from September 2023 onwards] (part of €11 million military aid package announced 16 June 2023). Including M113 Armoured Personnel Carriers with Remote Weapon Stations as a joint donation by Belgium, the Netherlands and Luxembourg.; Aircraft: Training for Ukrainian pilots on F-16 jet fighters.; 30 F-16s pledged by 2028.; €100 million allocated for the maintenance and support of F-16 jet fighters.; Naval vessels: 3 minehunter ships [Pledged 2024]. One of them, the Tripartite-class minehunter Narcis (M923) was delivered in 2025. Crew training provided by Belgium and the Netherlands.; Borys Aleksandrov. Belgium gifted the former Belgian navy Supply and research vessel Belgica.; Air defences: Several Mistral launchers [2023].; Several AIM-120 for NASAMS [2023].; 8 RIM-7 Sea Sparrow for SAM systems.; 15 Gepard SPAAGs pledged April 2026.; Mortars: 4 120mm MO-120 RTs [November 2022].; Vehicles: 240 Volvo Fassi N10 Trucks [150 delivered between March and April 2023].; Armoured ambulances [Pledged 2024].; Unmanned aerial vehicles: ''A few'' Sky-Hero Loki MkII Quadcopters [before December 2022].; 6 Primoco One 150s [2023] (joint with Luxembourg and the Netherlands).; Reconnaissance drones [Pledged 2024].; Unmanned underwater vehicles: 10 R7 Remotely Operated Vehicles [May 2023].; Anti-tank weapons: €1 million worth of MILANs [May or June 2022].; A small number of RK-2S Baryers [November 2022] (purchased from the CMI Group in Belgium).; 362 M72 LAWs [March 2022].; 1,260 RGW 90 Matadors [2022].; Small arms: 5,000 FN FNC assault rifles [March 2022].; Limited numbers of FN F2000 and F2000 tactical assault rifles [May 2022].; 4,000 FN SCAR-L and 25 SCAR-H assault rifles.; FN FAL assault rifles [2022].; FN MAG general-purpose machine guns [2022].; FN Minimi M1 and para light machine guns [2022].; 1,450 M2 heavy machine guns [delivered from 2022 onwards].; 3,700 assault rifles.; 120 grenade launchers.; 420 Submachine guns.; Ammunition and funding: ''Small arms ammunition'' [2022].; 1.5 million rounds of 12.7 mm ammunition [2022].; 105 mm shells worth €32.4 million [to be delivered].; Procurement of 155 mm ammunition through European Defence Agency [to be delivered].; €200 million in funding towards the Czech initiative to purchase artillery shells for Ukraine.; €75 million additional funding for the Czech artillery initiative pledged April 2026.; €373.1 million allocated for additional artillery munitions [Pledged March 2024].; €200 million allocated for the purchase of weapons from American companies.; €85 million pledged to the Latvian-led Drone Coalition.; €75 million pledged to the German led Air Defence Coalition.; Miscellaneous equipment: Gefechtshelm M92 'Casque Modèle 95' [delivered from March or April 2022 onwards].; Flack jackets [March or April 2022].; Night vision goggles [delivered from March or April 2022 onwards].; 3,800 tonnes of fuel (3 million litres) [March or April 2022 and June 2022].; Generators [before November 2022].; Sleeping bags [before November 2022].; 2 Mobile laboratories for CBRN protection [to be delivered].; 50 Bangalore torpedoes.; 3,200 additional rifle magazines.; 500 flare guns.; IT equipment through the IT Coalition.
Bulgaria	Bulgaria has provided 13 aid military aid packages to Ukraine since the full-scale invasion. Military-technical support: Military-technical support to the Ukrainian Armed Forces (which includes repairing Ukrainian military vehicles and equipment) [from May 2022 onwards].; Surface-to-air missiles: Non functional S-300 missiles to be repaired in Ukraine.; Jet aircraft: 14 Su-25s [April 2022] (purchased from Bulgaria by a NATO member state and delivered to Ukraine).; Armoured fighting vehicles: Undisclosed number of T-72M1 tanks [mid 2022] (purchased from Bulgaria and delivered to Ukraine by the Czech Republic); About 100 BTR-60 APCs [March 2024]; Multiple rocket launchers: Undisclosed number of 122 mm BM-21 Grad [May or June 2022] (purchased from Bulgaria and delivered to Ukraine by the Czech Republic).; Artillery: 122mm 2S1 Gvozdikas self propelled artillery [2022] (purchased by a NATO member state from Bulgaria and delivered to Ukraine).; (Czech Republic) 152mm D-20s howitzers [April 2022] (purchased by Czechia from Bulgaria and delivered to Ukraine).; Mortars: 60mm M60CMA commando mortars [before August 2022].; 50 82mm mortars.; Anti-tank weapons: 9M111MFB-1 Faktorias [before August 2022].; DRTG-73 rocket-propelled grenade launchers [before April 2022].; ATGL-L rocket-propelled grenade launchers [before November 2022].; Bulspike-AT rocket-propelled grenade launchers [Summer 2022]. 1,000 additional launchers were delivered in 2024.; Warrior SPG-9 Recoilless Rifles [before June 2022].; Small arms: 1460+ MG-1M General-Purpose Machine Guns (GPMGs) [before April 2022].; Ammunition: 152 mm artillery shells [delivered from April 2022 onwards].; 122 mm artillery shells [Since July 2022].; 155 mm artillery shells [delivered from March 2023 onwards] (purchased from Bulgaria by US).; 5.45×39mm ammunition; 7.62×54mmR Small Arms Rounds [before April 2023].; GHO-2 HE hand grenades [before February 2023].; OGi-7MA AP-FRAG rocket-propelled grenades [before August 2022].; PG-7VT Tandem Charge HEAT rocket propelled grenades [before December 2022].; RTB-7MA Thermobaric rocket-propelled grenades [before February 2022].; OG-9M HE Fragmentation Recoilless Rifle Grenades [before May 2023].; 30mm VOG-17M Grenades For Automatic Grenade Launchers [before June 2022].; 60mm HE60 MA Mortar Rounds [before August 2022].; 82mm HE82M Mortar Rounds [before February 2023].; 80mm ARS-8KOM Unguided Rockets [before April 2023].; 100mm 3UBK2 HEAT FRAG Anti-Tank Rounds [before July 2022].; 120mm HE120M Mortar Rounds [before August 2022].; 122mm Rockets [Since July 2022].; Military gear: 2000 Helmets [2022].; 2000 Bulletproof Vests [2022].; 5000 Sets Of Winter Clothing [Late 2022].; 5000 Pairs Of Winter Boots [Late 2022].; 350 Medical Kits [Late 2022].; Miscellaneous: Diesel fuel [delivered from April 2022 onwards].; Training: The deployment of 50 of their military personnel to annually train 60 Ukrainian combat medics [since 2023].
Cambodia	On 16 January 2023, 15 Ukrainian deminers arrived in Cambodia to receive training in removing landmines. Cambodian demining experts will also travel to Poland to train servicemen of the Armed Forces of Ukraine.
Canada	Canada has provided CAN $6.5 billion in military aid since 2022. Surface-to-air missile systems and missiles: 1 NASAMS battery [November 2024].; 12 AIM-120 AMRAAMs (for NASAMS II) [March 2023].; Further air defence missiles pledged February 2026.; CAN $350 million for air defence interceptors through the JUMPSTART program.; Air-to-air missiles: 43 AIM-9 missiles and 233 motors.; 250+ AIM-7 missiles and 125 components.; Artillery: 4+ 155mm M777s [April 2022] (including an undisclosed amount of M982 Excalibur GPS-guided shells).; 10 155mm replacement barrels.; Engineering vehicles and equipment: 1 Bergepanzer 3 ARV [March 2023].; 2 GCS-200 remote-controlled mine-clearing vehicles [May 2023].; 13 Toyota pickup trucks with demining equipment donated to the State Transport Special Service by the Canadian government and HALO Trust.; Armoured fighting vehicles: 8 Leopard 2A4s tanks [March 2023].; 39 Armoured Combat Support Vehicles (ACSVs) [December 2022].; 54 M113 APC chassis and 75,000 spare parts; 50 unspecified models of armoured vehicles over 3 years.; 91 LAV 6.0 ASCV.; CAN $400 allocated million for 35 additional ASCVs July 2026.; 25 LAV III Infantry fighting vehicles.; 64 Coyote armoured vehicles chassis for spare parts.; CAN $30 million for Bison and Coyote armoured vehicles with ammunition pledged in June 2025.; Infantry mobility vehicles: 208 Roshel Senators [eight were delivered in May 2022, 78 were delivered in June 2023, and a further 122 were delivered in mid-2023].; 13 Ghurka LAPV [11 delivered by December 2023]; Unmanned aerial vehicles: 900 Aeryon SkyRanger R70 [delivered from May 2024 onwards].; 76 Wescam MX-15Ds [May, June, October, and November 2022] for Bayraktar TB2 UCAVs. Additional CAN $80 million worth of MX-15s November 2026.; CAN $220 to purchase UAV, counter-drone, and EW electronic warfare capabilities, including investing in joint production of drones by Canadian and Ukrainian companies.; Anti-tank weapons: 107 Carl Gustaf M2 recoilless rifles [2022].; 4,200 M72 LAW anti-tank weapons [March 2022].; 7,000 anti-tank rockets [Spring 2022].; Small arms: 700 C8 carbines [February or March 2022].; 1,170+ C6 light and C9 medium machine guns [February or March 2022, September 2024].; 78 medium and heavy calibre sniper rifles [March 2022].; 600 Glock 17 Pistols [February or March 2022].; 10,500 9mm pistols [September 2024]; 40 ''Prairie Gun Works'' sniper rifles [between April and June 2023].; 38 7.62mm machine guns [to be delivered from June 2023 onwards].; 21,000 5.56mm assault rifles [to be delivered from June 2023 onwards].; Over 11,000 unspecified assault rifles [to be delivered].; In 2024, the Canadian government announced the delivery of CAN $27.3 million worth of small arms and ammunition, produced by Canadian defence companies.; 88 grenade launchers.; 78 Mk 19 automatic grenade launchers.; Ammunition: M982 Excalibur GPS-guided rounds for M777 howitzer [April 2022].; 955 rounds of 155 mm artillery smoke.; 55,291 155 mm artillery shells from Canadian purchases.; CAN $198 million towards the Czech scheme to purchase artillery shells and air defences for Ukraine.; CAN $89 million of artillery and autocannon rounds 2026–7.; More than 1800 rounds of 105 mm tank training ammunition (for Leopard 1 tanks donated by Denmark, Germany, and the Netherlands) [delivered in 2023].; 10,000 rounds of 105 mm ammunition.; 3,000+ 84 mm rounds for Carl Gustaf M2 [March and April 2022].; 7,500 C13 hand grenades [March 2022].; 12.9+ million rounds of ammunition [delivered from February or March 2022 onwards].; 130,000 additional rounds of ammunition [June 2024]; 100,000 120 mm ammunition for the Leopard 2A4 [to be delivered].; 3,500 Grad rockets (purchased by Canada from a Serbian company and delivered to Ukraine) [2023].; 85,300 CRV7 rocket motors; 1,300 CRV7 rocket warheads.; 277 1000-pound bombs for aircraft.; 1.6 million 20mm aircraft cannon rounds.; 2,000+ rounds of 81 mm mortar smoke.; 76mm naval ammunition.; Military gear: CG634 helmets [March 2022].; Body armour [March 2022].; 1,600 fragmentation vests [March 2022].; 2,260+ gas masks [March 2022 and later].; 140 Moskito thermal imagers.; CAN $7.5 million worth of night vision devices [March 2024].; Personal protective and load carriage equipment [February or March 2022].; 500,000 sets of winter clothing [October and December 2022].; CAN $80 million worth of additional winter uniforms, boots and thermal sleeping bags.; Boots.; 2000 sets of uniforms for female soldiers [to be delivered].; 29 Nanuk remote weapon stations.; CAN $20 million for Canadian-made protective equipment and uniforms.; 370 medical kits.; CAN $40 million for critical technology and engineering equipment.; Miscellaneous equipment: 16 radio stations for Leopard 2A4 MBT [to be delivered].; Surveillance and detection equipment [February or March 2022].; 59 high-resolution drone cameras [to be delivered].; CAN $22 million worth of satellite imaging services [Since March 2022].; CAN $2 million worth of satellite communications services [Since October 2022].; 1,315,000Meal, Ready-to-Eat (MREs).; Portable heaters [Since November 2022].; Thermal blankets [Since November 2022].; Sleeping bags [Since November 2022].; Generators [Since 2022].; Energy storage devices [Since November 2022].; 3 Leopard 2 gunnery simulators [April 2023 onwards].; Modular floatation bridges [to be delivered].; 3.3 million litres of fuel [Since April 2023].; 10 Zodiac Milpro Hurricane Rigid Inflatable Boats.; CAN $60 million for F-16 supplies and equipment such as spare parts, weapon stations, avionics, and ammunition.; Two instrument landing systems for F-16s. Another one was pledged in February 2025.; Four F-16 flight simulators. Another four were pledged in February 2025.; In June 2025, CAN $5 million worth of drone jammers were pledged.; Training: Training of more than 33,000 Ukrainian troops as part of Operation Unifier.; 170 instructors have been training Ukrainian soldiers as part of Operation Interflex.; CAN $15 million contribution to Denmark and France's efforts to train pilots, and maintain and support Ukraine's F-16s through a contract with Top Aces [to be delivered].; CAN $10.5 million to support Canadian Armed Forces training of Ukrainian military personnel [October 2024]; Financial aid: CAN $2.45 billion loans to Ukraine, including CAN $1.95 billion through the International Monetary Fund.; CAN $620 million to the Government of Ukraine.; CAN $50 million funding for mine clearing.; CAN $6 million to support the loan's implementation.; CAN $950,000 in additional funding to a Canadian government project to provide technical support.; CAN $900,000 to strengthen the Ukrainian national bank.; CAN $34.6 million for fuel and other equipment.; On 12 July 2023, the Canadian government announced CAN $541 million in new funding and projects to support Ukraine.; CAN $48.8 million to the NATO Comprehensive Assistance Package announced on 12 July 2023.; Contribution of CAN $50 million to the Leopard 2 Tank Maintenance Centre in Poland.; CAN $7.9 million in cyber security aid.; CAN $33 million to the United Kingdom-led partnership delivering high-priority air defence equipment to Ukraine.; CAN $3 million to the production of drones by the Ukrainian defence industry.; CAN $87 million funding for the Drone Capability Coalition.; CAN $2 million towards the IT Capability Coalition; CAN $40 million allocated to deliver urgently needed capabilities to the Armed Forces of Ukraine through the Danish Model, February 2025.; CAN $15 million allocated to aiding Canadian companies investing and operating in the Ukrainian defence industry.; Financing for the Ukrainian production of Shahed 136 intercepting drones.; CAN $2.3 billion in economic aid generated by frozen Russian assets by June 2025.; In June 2025, CAN $835 million was allocated for armoured vehicles, explosives, ammunition, small arms, medical equipment, and spare parts.; CAN $950 million for the purchase of American military equipment for Ukraine.; In June 2025, an additional CAN $165 million in funding was provided for various Capability Coalitions for Ukraine.; CAN $475 million allocated for ammunition for Ukraine July 2026.; ~CAN $23 million funding for Ukraine’s security architecture against hybrid threats.
Colombia	On 23 May 2022, Colombian Defence Minister Diego Molano Aponte announced that a team of 11 demining engineers of the National Army of Colombia will travel to an unspecified NATO country to train their Ukrainian counterparts on landmine removal.
Croatia	The Croatian Minister of Defence, Mario Banožić, approved military and humanitarian aid for Ukraine on 28 February 2022. As of November 2025, Croatia has announced the delivery of 15 military aid packages to Ukraine, with 14 packages of military aid worth over $212 million being fully delivered. On October 27, 2025, Croatian Defence Minister Ivan Anušić and Ukrainian Defence Minister Denys Shmyhal signed a Letter of Intent to expand joint arms production and deepen defence-industrial ties between the two countries. Transport aircraft: As of June and July 2024, Croatia is preparing to supply a total of 2 An-32B military transport aircraft to the State Emergency Service of Ukraine.; Helicopters: 14 Mi-8 helicopters (including Mi-8MTV-1 variants) [Nine delivered in May 2023, further five in June 2023].; Armoured fighting vehicles: 30 M-84 tanks. Their appearance on the Ukrainian battlefield was publicly confirmed for the first time in September 2025.; 30 BVP M-80 [to be delivered].; Artillery: 15 130mm M-46 (M-46H1 variant) field guns [13 August 2022].; 40 D-30 howitzers [before March 2023].; Multiple rocket launchers: RAK-SA-12 128mm multiple rocket launchers [April 2023].; APR–40 122mm multiple rocket launchers [2023].; Anti-tank: Anti-tank rockets [2022].; Small arms: 35,000 Zastava M70 assault rifles [February 2022].; 5,000 FN FAL battle rifles [2022].; Machine guns with ammunition [February 2022].; Man-portable air defence systems: 5–6 shipments of Strela-2 and Igla MANPADS systems [Since February or March 2022].; Ammunition: Tens of millions of small arms rounds [Since February 2022].; Thousands of grenades [2022].; Procurement of 155mm ammunition through the European Defence Agency.; Miscellaneous equipment and funding.: €15 million funding for the purchase of American weapons for Ukraine.; Protective equipment (helmets, ballistic vests, uniforms) [February 2022].
Cyprus	Financial aid: Funding for production of 155mm ammunition through European Defence Agency [to be delivered].; Training: Technical training on landmine clearance [From May 2023 onwards].
Czech Republic	As of the beginning of February 2023, the Czech Republic donated equipment worth CZK 10 billion (~ €420 million) from the Czech Army stock or purchased from private Czech companies. During the first year after the full-scale Russian invasion, Czech arms companies delivered to Ukraine military equipment worth CZK 30 billion (~ €1,27 billion), either through direct purchase by Ukraine or by other countries supporting Ukraine. By February 2024, the Czech Republic approved commercial military exports to Ukraine worth CZK 130 billion (~ €5,13 billion). 676 pieces of heavy equipment were delivered from the Czech Republic to Ukraine by July 2023, and this number rose to 834 by mid-April 2024 and 918 by the end of May 2024 Training and rehabilitation Before 24 February 2022: 1,200 Ukrainian soldiers received training in the Czech Republic ''Vyšpoint'' Military Academy by a combined Czech-British team of instructors (The British Military Advisory Training Team based in the Czech Republic), with particular focus on training of non-commissioned officers; After 24 February 2022: (European Union) EUMAM five-week training courses were provided primarily by the 7th Mechanized Brigade.; 2023: 3.240 Ukrainian soldiers trained in the Czech Republic. Initially, mostly mechanized infantry (+ logistics, CBRN, army engineers). From October 2023, light infantry training with a focus on trench warfare; 2024: Target of ~ 4.000 Ukrainian soldiers to be trained by the Czech Army; (Czech Republic) (European Union) EUMAM four-week training courses for Ukrainian Army specialists (medics, snipers, army engineers, chemical defence) by Czech Army instructors within Poland; ~1.100 soldiers trained in 2023; (Czech Republic) (European Union) EUMAM participation of a Czech instructor team within Germany, aimed at general military training; Treatment of wounded Ukrainian soldiers [from August 2022 onwards].; Basic training courses for pilots (Aero L-39 Albatros) [announced in July 2023]; Advance training courses for pilots (Saab JAS 39 Gripen) [announced in September 2023]; Up to eight F-16 pilots to be trained in 2025.; Tanks (218+) [of which 114 delivered by April 2023] From the Czech Army's stock: (Czech Republic) (Germany) 38 T-72M1 [April 2022] & 12 T-72M1 [April 2023] & 12 T-72M1 [May 2023] (Supported by subsequent German donations of 28 Leopard 2A4 MBTs).; 24 T-72M1 [by April 2025]; Purchased by Ukraine from Czech defence companies: 16 refurbished (not modernized) T-72M1 and T-55 (from private company Excalibur Army stock) [Spring 2022].; 11 T-72 Avenger (from private company Excalibur Army's stock) [Spring 2022].; Purchased by the Czechs and delivered to Ukraine: T-72M1 tanks acquired from Bulgaria by the Czech government [June 2022].; In cooperation and financial backing of other countries: (Czech Republic) (Netherlands) (United States) 90 T-72 Avenger (with option for a further 30) [deliveries from December 2022 onwards].; (Czech Republic) (Denmark) (Netherlands) 15 T-72 Avenger [announced in September 2023].; Infantry fighting vehicles (226+) From the Czech Army's stock (131): 45 BVP-1 from the Czech Army's deep storage [April 2022].; BVP-2.; BPzV Svatava combat reconnaissance vehicles [before May 2023].; From private companies: 56 PbV-501 purchased by Ukraine from Excalibur Army's stock [Spring 2022].; 39 unspecified [before 24 Feb 2023.]; Aircraft: Seven Mil Mi-24V attack helicopter; 10 Mil Mi-35 attack helicopters; Five Alto NG training planes.; Self-propelled artillery (50+): Yndisclosed number of 122 mm 2S1 Gvozdika [April 2022].; 13 152mm ShKH vz. 77 DANA from Czech Army reserves with at least 4,006 shells) [April 2022].; ~30 152mm DANA M2 purchased by Ukraine; newly made by Excalibur Army along with "thousands" of 152 mm DN1CZ extended range artillery shells [deliveries of 24 ordered from December 2022 onwards, unspecified number delivered before].; Towed artillery: Undisclosed number of 152 mm D-20 howitzers, purchased from Bulgaria [April 2022].; Multiple rocket launchers (35+): 12 122mm RM-70 Grad from Czech Army deep storage [April 2022].; 122 mm RM-70 Grad rockets.; 122 mm BM-21 Grad rockets, purchased from Bulgaria[May or June 2022].; Heavy mortars (128+): An undisclosed number of 120 mm PRAM-L heavy mortars.; An unspecified number of other mortars [before 24 Feb 2023].; Electronic warfare and intelligence, surveillance, target acquisition, and reconnaissance: Moruš electronic warfare units [April 2023].; unspecified ISTAR equipment [April 2023].; Self-propelled air defence systems (121): 6 9K35 Strela-10M [March or April 2022].; (Czech Republic) 100 MR2 Viktor (14.5mm anti-air machine gun pick-up trucks) made by Excalibur Army, paid by the Netherlands [delivery starting from March 2022 onwards].; 2 2K12 Kub-M2 air defence batteries (16 vehicles) along with a "large quantity" of rockets [August 2023].; Radars: 2 SURN 1S91 (for 2K12 Kub) [August 2023].; Man-portable air defence systems (435): 160 9K32 Strela-2 [March 2022] from the Czech Army reserves 30 more in 2024.; 275 unspecified MANPADS.; Anti-tank weapons: 10,000 RPG-75 [March 2022].; 645 anti-tank guided missiles [by May 2023].; Small arms: ~70.000 CZ BREN 2 assault rifles [from February 2022].; From the Czech Army reserves [February 2022]: 30,150 vz. 82 pistols.; 2,085 vz. 61 Škorpion machine pistols with 1 million rounds.; 5,000 vz. 58 assault rifles.; 3,200 UK vz. 59 machine guns.; 12 Dragunov marksman rifles.; 19 Falcon anti-materiel rifles.; 923 heavy machine guns.; Ammunition: Coordination of multinational purchase of heavy artillery shells: 3.5 million pcs [by September 2025] (1.3 million by mid-April 2024; 2 million pcs by August 2024.; Medium calibre shells: 22 million pcs [by August 2024].; An undisclosed number of tank shells and MLRS rockets.; An undisclosed quantity of small arms ammunition.; Deliveries above include: Donations from the Czech Army reserves: 17,400 mortar shells [by 24 Feb 2023], 84,860 artillery shells [by May 2023], an undisclosed amount of tank shells, 4,900 MLRS rockets [before 24 Feb 2023], 4,263,000 rounds of small arms ammunition [by 24 Feb 2023].; Deliveries of 155 mm ammunition, e.g., via the European Defence Agency. Annual manufacturing capacity: STV Group: 120,000 pcs (2023) - 240,000 pcs (2025) - 360,000 pcs (2026); Czechoslovak Group: 360.000 (2026), up from 150.000 pcs (2024) (partially made in the Czech Republic, partially in Slovakia); Miscellaneous equipment From the Czech Army stock: 5 radiological, chemical & biological defence reconnaissance vehicles [before 24 Feb 2023].; 47 unspecified vehicles [before 24 Feb 2023].; 2 pontoon bridges [June 2022].; 900 meters of interim bridges [before 24 Feb 2023].; Military medical supplies.; Radiation, chemical, and biological protection material.; Military clothing and equipment.; Fuel, spare parts, transport and other materials.; F-16 compatible flight simulators [July 2023].; Other: Tactical decoys [before February 2023].; 11 ambulances donated to the Ukrainian military by the Czech Embassy staff in Ukraine in coordination with the NGO Post Bellum
Denmark	Fighter jets: 19 F-16 Fighting Falcon fighter jets pledged on 20 August 2023.; Equipment for fighter jets.; Anti-ship missile system: 4 AGM-84 Harpoon coastal defence missile systems with Harpoon missiles [June 2022].; Self-propelled howitzers: 19 155mm Caesar 8x8s [April 2023].; 5 (out of 16) 155mm ShKH Zuzana 2s [delivered from July 2023 onwards] (In cooperation with Germany and Norway).; 18 155mm 2S22 Bohdana self-propelled guns purchased for the Ukrainian army.; An unknown number of 2S1 Gvozdika.; Armoured fighting vehicles: 40 (out of 80) Leopard 1A5 DKs [to be delivered in 2023] (In cooperation with Germany).; An unspecified number of Leopard 1A5s [to be delivered in 2024] (In cooperation with Germany and the Netherlands).; A further 30 Leopard 1 tanks pledged September 2023.; 7 (out of 14) Leopard 2A4s [to be delivered in 2024] (In cooperation with the Netherlands).; (Czech Republic) (Denmark) (Netherlands) 15 T-72 Avenger [announced in September 2023].; Additional T-72 tanks pledged October 2023.; Marder IFVs [delivered by June 2024].; 80 BMP-2 (35+ Purchased From Czechia) [to be delivered].; An unspecified number of CV90 Infantry Fighting Vehicles in cooperation with Sweden.; 54 M113G3DK/G4DKs APCs [July and August 2022] taken from Danish stocks and overhauled with German funding.; Engineering vehicles and equipment: A Pionierpanzer 2A1 Dachs Armoured Engineering Vehicle [February 2024].; Pansret Broslagningsvogn Biber bridgelayers [2023].; PNINK Wisent 1 armoured recovery vehicles (ARVs) [2023].; Hydrema 910 mine-clearing vehicles [2022/2023].; Minerydningsslange M/97 man-portable mine clearing charges [before April 2023].; Mine flails [2022].; 21 bomb disposal robots [2022].; 2 mobile field bridges [2022/2023].; Demining hoses [to be delivered].; Mine clearing equipment. [2024]; Vehicles: 2 Toyota Land Cruisers [2022/2023].; Mortars: Heavy mortars [2022].; Air defence systems: Anti-aircraft guns [to be delivered].; Ammunition for air defences.; Air defences announced in December 2024.; SKr 480 million order for Tridon Mk 2 SPAAGs for Ukraine.; Man-portable air defence systems and missiles: 407 Stinger missiles [2022] (Delivered along with 330 grip stocks and 810 batteries).; Reconnaissance unmanned aerial vehicles: 25 Sky-Watch Heidruns [April 2022].; Unmanned underwater vehicles: Mine-detecting underwater vehicles [2022/2023].; Radars: Anti-drone radars [2022/2023].; Radars and communication equipment.; Anti-tank weaponry: 2,700 M72 LAWs [2022].; AT4s [February 2022].; 8,000 RPG-7 rocket launchers [2022/2023] (bought from a third country and delivered to Ukraine).; Pansermine M/56 anti-tank mines [before February 2023].; Small arms: 54 M2 heavy machine guns [July and August 2022].; 40 mm grenade launchers [to be delivered].; 7.62mm Machine guns[2023].; Pistols; Ammunition: 5.56mm ammunition [2022].; 6,685 rounds for the 84 mm Carl Gustaf recoilless rifle [Late 2022 or early 2023].; 105 and 125mm tank ammunition.; 120mm BGR M/50 mortar rounds [before August 2022].; 19,000+ 155 mm artillery rounds for the Caesar self-propelled howitzers [2022 and 2023] (In cooperation with Norway).*; 15,000 155 mm artillery rounds purchased for Ukraine in cooperation with the Czech Republic.; Additional shells pledged October 2023.; Additional shells pledged via the Czech scheme May 2025.; 15,000 long range artillery shells pledged June 2026.; Propellant charges (For the M109) [2022/2023].; 29,000 rounds of RPG-7 ammunition [2022/2023] (bought from a third country and delivered to Ukraine).; 500 hand grenades [June 2023].; Over 50,000 20mm cannon rounds for F-16 fighters October 2026.; 40 mm grenade launcher ammunition.; Military clothing and gear: Thermal binoculars.; 1,300 night-vision goggles.; 500 lightweight CBRN protective suits.; 3,000 protective vests.; 2,000 Pieces of protective equipment.; 3,000 sleeping bags.; 3,000 sleeping mats.; 532,500 Meal, Ready-to-Eat (MREs).; 2,200 first aid bags.; 11,000 compress dressings.; 15,000 sets of rainwear.; 8,000 hats.; 5,000 heat and release gloves.; Miscellaneous equipment: 15 mobile workshops for the repair of large vehicles.; Spare parts for M109 SPG.; A field hospital.; A tent camp for 320 people.; six hangar tents.; 96 living containers.; 15 military hardened generators.; 12 electric generators.; Three AM radio transmitters.; 4 fire extinguishing modules.; Two breach packs.; 20 heat torches.; 10 hand-held chemical detectors.; Medical equipment.; DKK 80 million of fuel via NATO's Support and Procurement Agency; Spare parts for Caesar SPG [2023].; 10 forward areomedical evacuation kits.; Camouflage nets.; Satellite receiver terminals and services.; 10 climate controlled mobile storage hangers donated to the Ukrainian Air Force.; Training: Training of the Ukrainian military since 2016 as part of British-led Operation Orbital.; On 10 August 2022, the Danish government announced that it would deploy 130 military instructors to assist with the training of Ukrainian soldiers in the UK. Shortly after, it was announced that Ukrainian military personnel were also being trained in Denmark, the first group completed the training in the fall of 2022.; Training of Ukrainian pilots on F-16 fighters [to be delivered].; €33 million invested into modernisation of Ukrainian training infrastructure and equipment announced February 2026.; Financial aid: Additional funding for the EU's program to purchase equipment and supplies for Ukraine's military.; DKK 2.5 billion (€336 million) in civilian contributions to Ukraine, not including Danish support via the EU.; €50 million for NATO funding to purchase non-lethal equipment.; Military donations worth DKK 11.2 billion (€1.5 billion) from February 2022 to 31 August 2023, including: DKK 300 million (€40 million) to the UK-led military equipment for Ukraine fund on 21 December 2022.; DKK 7 billion (€940 million) to a Danish fund set up in March 2023 to aid Ukraine's military sector, among other sectors.; DKK 22 billion (€3 billion) for additional military support from the Danish national Ukraine Fund, of which the majority of the funds will be available in 2023 and 2024.; DKK 100 million towards the joint European purchase of 155 mm artillery shells for Ukraine.; DKK 1.8 billion towards the Swedish purchase of CV90 IFVs for Ukraine.; DKK 91 million towards cyber security projects for the Ukrainian military.; DKK 2.4 billion in military aid was announced in October 2024, including the purchase of equipment from Danish and Ukrainian defence industries, funding of air defence systems in cooperation with Germany, and financing towards the British-led International Fund for Ukraine.; In November 2024, €130 million was announced for the Ukrainian defence industry for the production of Ukrainian missiles and drones.; Further DKK 100 million for military donations through the Danish model.; In December 2024, financing for the operation of Ukrainian F-16s as part of a DKK 2.1 aid package was announced.; DKK 300 million allocated for an innovation fund to support Ukrainian military technological developments.; In April 2025, the provision of DKK 317 million was announced for the purchase of artillery shells through Estonia.; DKK 952 million contribution to the purchase of Patriot missiles from.; DKK 4.4 billion funding for materiel, weapons and ammunition and training for Ukraine, DKK 1.3 of which allocated for purchases from the Ukrainian defence industry June 2026.
Estonia	As of 15 December 2023, Estonia has provided Ukraine EUR 500 million worth of military aid since 2022. Artillery: 36 122mm D-30s [delivered from March 2022 onwards].; 24 155mm FH-70s [delivered from May 2022 onwards].; 120mm mortars [2022/2023].; Vehicles: 13 vehicles [delivered before April 2022].; 7 Alvis 4 protected mobility vehicles [May 2022].; MAN KAT1 6x6 trucks [delivered from May 2022 onwards].; "Vehicles" [to be delivered].; 62 vehicles donated to the police and Border Guard by Estonian police.; Engineering vehicles: 1 DOK-ING MV-4 remote-controlled mine clearance vehicle, donated by Päästeliit [August 2023].; Naval vehicles: Patrol boats [to be delivered].; "Vessels" [to be delivered].; Two Patrol boats, in coordination with Denmark, were delivered in April 2024.; Drones: 7 unmanned aerial vehicles [February 2023].; 7 EOS C VTOLs; crowdfunded by the Lithuanian public [June 2022].; Anti-tank weapons: Hundreds of M2 Carl-Gustaf anti-tank systems with ammunition [before August 2022].; 100 FGM-148 Javelins [February 2022]. More Javelins donated later [to be delivered].; EFP PK-14 anti-tank mines [delivered before August 2022].; 40,000+ Anti-tank mines [delivered before April 2022].; MILAN anti-tank missile systems with ammunition [March 2022].; Instalaza C90 rocket-propelled grenade launchers [March 2022].; 90 mm recoilless anti-tank guns Pansarvärnspjäs 1110 [before August 2022].; Surface-to-air missiles: Mistral MANPADS.; Small arms: Small arms, including 35,000 M14 automatic rifles [delivered before April 2022].; Rifles and pistols [February 2023].; Grenade launchers [to be delivered].; Sniper rifles [before June 2022, and later].; 150 additional handguns with ammunition, provided August 2023.; Machine guns [to be delivered].; Ammunition: Tens of millions of cartridges for small arms [delivered from March 2022 onwards].; Thousands of 122 mm artillery shells [Spring 2022].; Thousands of 155 mm artillery shells [Spring 2022].; An additional 10,000 artillery shells [February 2025]; Additional shells June 2025.; 5.56mm ammunition [to be delivered].; Miscellaneous equipment: Protective equipment (helmets, flak jackets) [March 2022].; 10,000 winter uniforms (including jackets, trousers, shirts, socks, and boots) [2022/2023].; Thousands of camouflage suits [2022/2023].; 50,000 field rations [March 2022].; 750,000 field rations [February 2025]; Sights, thermal imagers, and binoculars [From February 2023 onwards].; Communications equipment [2022/2023].; Medical equipment and supplies [2022 and 2023].; Generators and chargers [February 2023].; Four field hospitals (in cooperation with Germany, the Netherlands, and Norway) [2022 and 2023].; Two saunas [December 2022 and March 2023].; Diving equipment [to be delivered].; Gas masks.; Training and rehabilitation: Training of Ukrainian special forces, airborne troops, and ground troops [From 2015 onwards].; Training of Ukrainian soldiers on FH-70 howitzers in Estonia [From April 2022 onwards].; 30 instructors provided military training to Ukrainian soldiers as part of British-led Operation Interflex.; Training of Ukrainian soldiers as part of the European Union Military Assistance Mission in support of Ukraine.; Rehabilitation of wounded Ukrainian soldiers [From 2016 onwards].; Financial aid: €5 million funding for the IT Coalition to the Ukrainian military in April 2025. Further IT equipment was delivered in August 2025.; €3.5 million for the purchase of Starlink terminals via the IT Coalition.; €31 million contribution for the purchase of weapons for Ukraine from American stocks.
Finland	Finland has provided €3.6 billion worth of military equipment to Ukraine in 35 packages. Armoured personnel carriers: Sisu XA-185s [September 2022].; Combat engineering vehicles: 6 Leopard 2R mine-clearing tanks [before June 2023].; Artillery: 122mm 122 PSH 74s (2S1 Gvozdikas SPGs) [August 2023].; 152mm 152 K89 (2A36 Giatsint-B howitzers) [April 2023].; 130mm 130 K54s (M-46s howitzers) [before September 2023].; Mortars: 120mm 120 Krh 85 92s [August 2022].; Air defences: 23mm 23 ITK 61 'Sergei' (ZU-23)s [August 2022].; Ilmatorjuntaohjus 90M air defence vehicle.; Anti-tank weaponry: 1,500 66 KES (M72 LAW) anti-tank weapons [March 2022].; 112mm RSKES APILAS [before April 2023].; Drones: Zeus FPV drones.; Small arms: 12.7mm 12,7 ItKK 96 heavy machine guns [September 2022].; 2,500 assault rifles [March 2022].; Ammunition: 155mm 155 tkr88 artillery rounds [May 2022].; 120mm JVA 1571 mortar grenades [before October 2022].; Sirpalekäsikranaatti M/50 hand grenades [before October 2022].; JVA 0406 sahte 80-16 smoke grenades [before February 2023 ].; 150,000 rounds of 7.62mm ammunition [March 2022] (For the Finnish-delivered assault rifles).; Procurement of 155 mm ammunition through the European Defence Agency [to be delivered].; €30 million towards the Czech purchase of artillery shells for the Armed Forces of Ukraine.; €90 million from interest generated from frozen Russian assets used to purchase artillery shells for Ukraine.; Miscellaneous equipment: 2,000 helmets [March 2022].; 2,000 bulletproof vests [March 2022].; 70,000 Meal, Ready-to-Eat (MREs) [March 2022].; Training: 20 instructors as part of Operation Interflex.; Financial aid: €86 million economic aid as of 24 February 2022.; €140 million Contribution to the purchase of American weapons for Ukraine.
France	France was the largest arms exporter to Ukraine between 2014 and 2020, providing over €1.6 billion worth of weapons and military equipment. Among them were: helicopters, reconnaissance drones, navy-related weaponry and equipment, targeting systems, ammunition of various calibres, and fire control systems. The full extent of French military aid in the context of the 2022 Russian invasion of Ukraine is unknown, as many specifics are neither shared by France nor Ukraine, but include: Defence equipment donated before the Russian invasion and pre-war training of Ukrainian troops.; Additional delivery of defence equipment to the Ukrainian authorities was announced on 26 February 2022.; On 13 April 2022, the French Minister of Defence announced the provision of additional weapons to Ukraine.; On 30 April 2022, President Macron pledged an increase in military support to Ukraine, reiterating on 17 May 2022 that weapon deliveries would not only continue but would additionally increase in the days and weeks to come.; Lecornu also added the supply of batteries of Exocet anti-ship missiles to help open gaps in the maritime blockade imposed by Russia and allow Ukraine to resume its exports of grain and raw materials, which was among the further weapons deliveries being examined.; French contribution to the European Peace Facility Fund (a €500 million contribution out of a total of €3 billion as of December 2022).; On 13 October 2022, the creation of a French special military fund, totaling €200 million, was inked. It will allow Ukraine to purchase military equipment it desires from French defence contractors.; On 15 October 2022, it was announced that France would be training up to 2,000 Ukrainian soldiers on its soil. They will be assigned to French units for several weeks.; On 4 January 2023, President Emmanuel Macron promised President Zelenskyy AMX-10 RC and ACMAT Bastion to Ukraine. This is the first time Ukraine has received "Western tanks," according to the French government.; On 31 January 2023, it was announced that France will also send 150 military personnel to Poland to train up to 600 Ukrainian troops per month.; Fighter jets: An unspecified number of Dassault Mirage 2000-5 and pilot training [delivered from February 2025 onwards].; MICA air-to-air missiles for Mirage jets, more delivered September 2026; 30mm ammunition.; Intelligence, surveillance, and reconnaissance support: Intelligence, surveillance, and reconnaissance support, including ongoing access to French satellite imagery (various French electromagnetic and observation satellites, such as the CERES, Composante Spatiale Optique, Pléiades, and Helios, provide intel several times a day to the Ukrainian military staff) and a few dozen agents from the Directorate General for External Security's Action Division deployed on the ground since the beginning of the war.; Cruise missiles and aerial bombs: SCALP EGs [Since July 2023].; 10 additional SCALP EGs were pledged late 2024.; 50 AASM Hammer aerial bombs per month [delivered from March 2024 onwards]; 63 Mark 81 bombs; Air defence systems: A SAMP/T battery (joint donation with Italy) [May 2023].; Two additional SAMP/T batteries on loan to Ukraine, to be returned upon delivery of purchased batteries. Additional munitions delivered September 2026.; Two Crotale NG batteries [November 2022].; Acquisition of two complete short-range air defence systems from Thales, including Ground Master 200 radars, command and control centre, radio communications system, and air threat designation terminals (purchased through the French military fund) [One delivered in 2023, another one ordered in 2024]; Aster air defence missiles.; Multiple rocket launchers: Four 227mm LRU MLRS [November 2022].; Artillery: 30 155mm 6x6 CAESAR self-propelled howitzers [delivered from May 2022 onwards] (delivered along with tens of thousands of shells, including LU 211 HE shells, BONUS munitions, and Ralec proximity fuzes).; Six 155mm TRF1s [October 2022] purchased by Ukraine through the security capacity building fund.; Mortars: 10 MO-120 RT heavy mortars.; Armoured fighting vehicles: Over 38 AMX-10 RC vehicles [delivered from March 2023 onwards].; 284 VAB APCs as of May 2024.; Infantry mobility vehicles: 20 ACMAT Bastions [to be delivered] (purchased by Ukraine via the French military fund).; Vehicles: Renault TRM 2000 trucks [August and September 2022].; 10 Renault TRM 10000 ACH Fuel Trucks [October 2022].; Six Renault GBC 180 all-terrain 6X6 cargo trucks [before October 2022].; 120 Peugeot P4 off-road vehicles.; P4s were crowdfunded by the Ukrainian public [July and August 2022].; 49 Zodiac FUTURA RHIBs.; Engineering equipment: Motorised floating bridges [to be delivered] (purchased by Ukraine via the French military fund).; Dozens of VAB Génie engineering vehicles [to be delivered].; Man portable air defence systems: Six Mistral systems [February or March 2022].; Mistral air defence missile systems were pledged late 2024.; Anti tank weapons: 18 MILAN ATGM systems [before May 2024]. More missiles pledged March 2025.; FGM-148 Javelin anti-tank missile systems [March 2022].; Akeron MPs [delivered before February 2023].; 1,002 AT4s.; Anti-tank mines: 4,600 HPD2A2s [June or July 2022].; Unmanned aerial vehicles: 220 reconnaissance drones purchased from the French company Delair [before September 2023].; 100 loitering munitions from the French company Delair ordered, 2,000 pledged in total [March 2024].; 10 drone detectors.; Additional drones were supplied in March 2025.; Small arms: AA-52 general-purpose machine guns [July 2022].; 7.62mm ANF-1 general-purpose machine guns (For VAB APC) [July 2022].; 7.62mm FN MAG general-purpose machine guns [July 2022].; 710 12.7mm machine guns; 1,000 FAMAS rifles; 30 sniper rifles; 20 Submachine guns; Ammunition: 1.1 million ammunition of various calibres (12.7mm ammunition, 155 mm artillery rounds, etc.).; 13,000 OF 37 HE hand grenades. [May 2022].; 1.72 million small arms ammunition.; 1.75 million 12.7mm ammunition.; 46,500 × 155 mm artillery rounds.; 10,000 × 105 mm rounds for AMX10 RC.; Individual equipment: 6200 Helmets.; 1,971 Night vision binoculars.; "Protective equipment".; 3,100 cold-weather gear.; 100 pieces of flight gear.; 6500 Bulletproof vests.; 1100 NBC suits.; Uniforms.; De-mining suits.; 300 containers of freeze-dried blood plasma.; 100,800 combat rations.; 3700 Army medical kits.; 200 GPS; Engineering: 38,200 fuses; 18,300 detonators; 44,400 pieces of pyrotechnic equipment.; Miscellaneous equipment: Fuel [March/April and September 2022].; 215 tonnes of petroleum products.; 38,065 cubic metres of jet fuel.; Electro-optical/Infra-red systems (including night detection binoculars ordered from Thales and Safran and delivered in late March or early April 2022).; 36 prefabricated bridges from 23 to 46 meters in length.; 100 frequency scanners.; 30 Iridium satellite terminals.; Two 300 kVA power generators; Training: Over 6,000 Ukrainian soldiers were trained in the first eight months of 2023.; Training of Ukrainian pilots to begin in 2024.; Financial aid: In 2021: €1.6 billion in aid.; In 2022: Donations: Financial donation of €300 million (US$337 million) in "additional budgetary assistance" announced by President Macron on 25 February.; On 5 May, President Macron announced $1.7 billion had been donated to Ukraine so far in 2022.; On 5 May, an additional US$300 million in financial aid was announced, bringing the total to US$2 billion.; In October 2022, France announced the creation of a special fund for direct weapons purchases, totaling €200 million.; Loans: On 8 February 2022, €1.2 billion in programme funding was announced, consisting of a loan of €200 million and €1 billion in financial guarantees (these guarantees will allow Ukraine to obtain loans from French banks on favorable terms).; Announcement of a budgetary loan of €300 million on 29 March 2022 in order to help the country cope with the economic and social consequences of the ongoing conflict.; Further French financial contributions to Ukraine through the European Union's grants and loans since 2014.; French contributions to the European Union's military aid.
Germany	Military support: * Purchases by the German government from defence companies ** Purchases by Ukraine Delivered: (as of the end of February 2025) Armoured fighting vehicles: 103 main battle tanks Leopard 1A5* with spare parts (joint project with Denmark); 269 mine-resistant ambush-protected vehicles*; 140 infantry fighting vehicles MARDER with spare parts (from Bundeswehr and industry stocks*); 78 tracked all-terrain vehicles Bandvagn 206*; 11 All Terrain Tracked Carrier Warthog*; 5 All Terrain Tracked Carrier Warthog*; 66 armoured personnel carriers*; 18 Leopard 2A6 main battle tanks with ammunition and spare parts; 50 MRAP vehicles (ATF Dingo); 54 M113 armoured personnel carriers, each with 2 MG and spare parts* (systems of Denmark, upgrades financed by Germany); Air defence systems: 6 air defence systems IRIS-T SLM*; 5 air defence systems IRIS-T SLS*; IRIS-T SLM missiles*; IRIS- SLS missiles; 16 kinetic defence vehicle* (Diehl Defence); 60 self-propelled anti-aircraft guns GEPARD with spare parts; 330,000 rounds of ammunition for self-propelled anti-aircraft guns GEPARD; 16 air surveillance radar TRML-4D*; AIM-9L/I-1 Sidewinder missiles, further stocks pledged for 2026.; Sea Sparrow missiles; 3 air defence systems PATRIOT with 4 PATRIOT launchers; 2 air defence systems Skynex with ammunition*; 4,000 rounds of practice ammunition for self-propelled anti-aircraft guns; 500 man-portable air-defence system FIM-92 Stinger; 2,700 man-portable air-defence system Strela; Artillery: 454,000 rounds of 155 mm ammunition; 24,000 rounds of 122 mm ammunition; 25 self-propelled howitzers Panzerhaubitze 2000 with spare parts; 21,000 rounds 155 mm smoke/illuminating ammunition; 7 howitzer tubes M109 155 mm*; 3 HIMARS multiple rocket launchers; 9 155 mm SpGH Zuzana wheeled self-propelled howitzers jointly financed with Denmark and Norway*; 155mm precision guided ammunition* (SMArt, VULCANO); 5 multiple rocket launchers MARS II with ammunition; 20 rocket launchers 70mm on pick-up trucks with rockets*; counter battery radar system COBRA*; 10 laser target designators and portable fire control modules for VULCANO artillery ammunition*; Drones and anti-drone systems: 15,000 STRILA interceptor drones purchased for the Ukrainian National Guard.; 1,050 HF-1 loitering munitions; 1,640 reconnaissance drones with spare parts*; 2,000 TerMIT unmanned ground vehicles.; 30 Gereon RCS tracked unmanned ground vehicles*; 80 unmanned surface vessels*; 200 mobile drone jammers*; 88 anti-drone sensors and jammers*; 70 frequency range extensions for anti-drone devices*; 180 RF 360 fieldkits – drone detection systems*; 49 drone detection systems*; 93 drone sensors*; 1 LUNA NG reconnaissance system*; 10 anti-drone guns*; 12 electronic anti-drone devices*; Military engineering capabilities: material for explosive ordnance disposal (from Bundeswehr and industry stocks*); 25 mobile, remote-controlled, and protected mine-clearing systems*; 27 bridge-laying tanks BEAVER with spare parts*; 65 mine-clearing tanks WISENT 1 with spare parts*; 81 mine ploughs*; 200 portable mine-clearing systems H-PEMBS*; 90 mine detectors*; 12 armoured engineer vehicles DACHS with spare parts*; 6 High Mobility Engineer Excavators; 28 armoured recovery vehicles Bergepanzer 2 with spare parts*; 500 tool kits with blasting material*; 19 heavy and medium bridge systems and 12 trailers; 5 bridges for bridge-laying tank BEAVER; 2 armoured recovery vehicles Bergepanzer 3; 12 mobile and protected mine-clearing systems Ahlmann*; Protective and special equipment: 15 air assault vehicles Caracal*; 15 AMPS self-protection systems for helicopters*; 100 underwater scooters*; 290 border protection vehicles*; 52 mobile antenna mast systems*; 1,508 laser range finders*; 347 infrared binoculars*; 123 ground surveillance radars*; 58,000 combat helmets; 331SatCom terminals*; 750 night vision goggles*; IT equipment*; 2,000 LED lamps*; 84 outboard motors; 400 IR cameras*; 3 Satcom surveillance systems*; 1 naval mine clearance system*; 2,667 Secure telephones*; 90,600 safety glasses (from Bundeswehr and industry stocks*); 1 PCB printer*; 1 antenna hub station; 1,288 binoculars; 5 mobile reconnaissance systems SurveilSPIRE*; 10 radio jammers*; 40 laser target designators*; 1 radio frequency system; 3,000 field telephones with 5.000 cable reels and carrying straps; 230 field glasses*; 1 communications electronic scanner/jammer system*; 6 mobile decontamination vehicles HEP 70, including decontamination material; 10 HMMWV (8x ground radar capability, 2x jamming/anti drone capability)*; 1 high-frequency unit with equipment*; Logistics: 262 trucks Zetros*; 65 Unimog trucks donated to the State Border Guard.; 78 tankers Zetros*; 24 tank transporter tractor M1070 Oshkosh*; 473 vehicles (trucks, minibuses, all-terrain vehicles) (from Bundeswehr and industry stocks*); 181 pick-ups*; 10 more pick-ups donated to the Ukrainian National Guard.; 40 protected vehicles*; 90 truck tractor trains 8x8 HX81 and 90 semi-trailers*; 25 trucks MAN TGS*; 40 load-handling trucks 8x8; 34 load-handling trucks 15t*; 6 load-handling trucks 8x6 with 21 rolls of containers*; 14 tracked and remote-controlled infantry vehicles THeMIS*; Around 100 cars and vans were donated to the Ukrainian National Guard and police units in January 2025.; 10 tractor-trailers donated to the Ukrainian National Guard in January 2025.; 24 pickup trucks donated to the Ukrainian National Guard.; Dump trucks, generators, and water purification equipment to the Border Guard Service in March 2025.; Five road rollers, a crane truck, generators and water filters generators and water purification equipment were donated to the Border Guard Service in July 2025.; Combat readiness and survivability: 467,000 rounds of ammunition 40mm*; 34,000 120mm mortar ammunition*; 19,480 anti-tank mines (from Bundeswehr and industry stocks*); 3,000 anti-tank weapons, Panzerfaust 3, with 900 launchers; 50 Bunkerfaust with 15 launchers; 16,917 man-portable anti-tank weapons RGW 90*; 220 grenade launchers GMG*; spare parts for the heavy machine gun M2; 268 machine gun MG3 with 500 spare barrels and breechblocks; 200 machine guns MG4*; 450 machine guns MG5*; 4,750 HK 416 assault rifles; 5,800 MK 556* assault rifles; 73 AK-47 assault rifles; 484 precision rifles HLR 338 with 314,000 rounds of ammunition*; 881 CR 308 battle rifles*; 3,769 G3 battle rifles; 3,500 SFP9 pistols*; more than 60 million rounds of ammunition for firearms (from Bundeswehr and industry stocks*); 393,400 Tourniquets; 1 million trauma bandages*; 370,000 chest seals* (emergency pressure bandages); 1,420,000first aid kits*; emergency power generators; 250 tents; 2 field hospitals*; 93,000 smoke grenades*; 100,000 m detonating cord and 115.000 detonators; rescue boats*; 6.132 camouflage nets (from Bundeswehr and industry stocks*); 6,000 ponchos*; 450 snow chains; 205,000 single module group rations; medical material; 10 All Terrain Tracked Carrier Warthog (ambulance); 49 ambulance vehicles*; At least nine MEDIGUARD B6 armoured CASEVAC vehicles.; 30,000 winter clothing sets; 27,477 backpacks; 1,202 Infusion kits; 8 dental sterilizers; 2 hangar tents*; 8 lift trucks*; 295 generators; 168 mobile heating systems*; 88,400 wool blankets; 15,300 sleeping bags; Mi-24 spare parts*; 116,000 winter jackets; 80,000 winter trousers; 240,000 winter hats; 320,000 pre-packaged military Meals Ready; 67 fridges for medical material*; 100,000 hand grenades; 5,300 explosive charges; 350,000 detonators; 100 auto-injector devices; 15 palettes of military clothing; 1,200 hospital beds; 18 palettes of medical material, 60 surgical lights; protective clothing, surgical masks; 1 field hospital (project jointly financed with Estonia)*; Diesel and gasoline*; 10 tons AdBlue*; 500 medical gauzes*; MiG-29 spare parts*; 1,600 Gabions to the Ukrainian Border Guard Service.; Helmets and 2,569 class VI bulletproof vests were provided to Ukrainian National Police officers by the German Embassy and the Global Fund for Security Sector Reform.; Financial aid: €1.83 billion in bilateral aid since 2014.; Approx. €4 billion via the EU in the form of grants and loans since 2014.; €240 million in EU loans in 2022.; Loan of over €150 million via KfW in April 2022.; €425 million via the 'Stand Up For Ukraine' pledging campaign and an additional 70 million for medical aid via the EU.; Over €1 billion in additional military aid to Ukraine for weapons purchases in April 2022.; An additional €1 billion was pledged in the form of grants in May 2022.; £10 million additional contribution to the Drone Capability Coalition announced by the British MoD in November 2024.; $500 million funding for the purchase of weapons for Ukraine from US military stocks.; The establishment of an electronic warfare capability coalition for the Ukrainian military was announced in April 2025 alongside nine other nations.; Financing for the Ukrainian production of Shahed 136 intercepting drones.; €200 million in funding for the procurement of medium range drones for Ukraine announced March 2026.; €10 million funding for an EU initiative to construct training facilities in Ukraine.; €300 million funding for the Czech artillery shell scheme.; €90 million funding for 50,000 Skyfall Shrike FPV drones for Ukraine.
Greece	The priority access to the port of Alexandroupolis in Northern Greece allowed the U.S. to provide military assistance to Ukraine. As of July 2024, Greek military support for Ukraine stood at an estimated €300 million. Greece will buy new arms from the Czech Republic for Ukraine; the equipment will be transferred directly to Ukraine. The purchase will be ammunition and air defence. Air defences: 24 RIM-7 Sea Sparrow air defence missiles pledged in December 2024.; Stinger missiles.; Unspecified anti-aircraft weapons [to be delivered, announced in March 2024].; Artillery: 70 M114A1 towed howitzers [to be delivered, announced in March 2024].; 60 M110A2 203mm self-propelled howitzers [to be delivered, announced in October 2025].; Infantry fighting vehicles: 40 BMP-1A1s [delivered from October 2022 onwards] (From Greek stocks in exchange for 40 Marder IFVs through the 'Ringtausch' programme).; Unknown Quantity of BMP-1A1s [to be delivered].; Anti-tank weapons: 815 RPG-18s [delivered from February 2022 onwards].; Small arms: Two C-130 planeloads of rifles, ammunition, and grenades, including 20,000 Kalashnikov Rifles' [delivered from February 2022 onwards].; Ammunition and funding: An unknown quantity of 122mm rocket artillery rounds for BM-21 and RM-70 MRL [delivered from February 2022 onwards].; Artillery ammunition.; Small arms ammunition.; Procurement of 155mm ammunition through the European Defence Agency.; 20,000 155mm artillery shells.; 2,000 Zuni rockets [announced in March 2024], thousands of 70mm and 127mm Zuni rockets [announced in October 2025].; 200 2.75-inch (70 mm) rockets [announced in March 2024].; 90,000 90mm anti-tank rounds [announced in March 2024].; 4 million bullets [announced in March 2024].; 150,000 rounds of ammunition (50,000 M106 high-explosive rounds, 40,000 M650 rocket-assisted shells, 30,000 M404 ICM cluster rounds, and 30,000 M509A1 DPICM dual-purpose cluster munitions) [announced in October 2025].; €20 million funding for the purchase of American weapons for Ukraine.; Training: Training for Ukrainian pilots of F-16 jet fighters [2023/2024].; The deployment of Hellenic Army soldiers to train Ukrainian Special Forces [2022/2023].; The deployment of Hellenic Army soldiers to train Ukrainian tankers on Leopard 2 tanks [2022/2023].; Additional resources to accelerate the training of Ukrainian pilots and technical personnel for F-16 aircraft pledged October 2024.; Medical aid: Rehabilitation of wounded Ukrainian soldiers in Greece [2023].
Hungary	Training and rehabilitation: Training of Ukrainian combat medics [by March 2023].; Help in the hospitalization of wounded Ukrainian soldiers [by March 2023].
Iceland	Iceland's military aid to Ukraine amounts to a value of approximately 2.7bn ISK (US$19.4 million). Ammunition: Ikr 600 million towards the Czech scheme to purchase artillery shells for Ukraine.; Vehicles: 10 fuel trucks (two delivered in May 2023).; Logistical support: The Government of Iceland decided to offer to transport military equipment to Ukraine for other countries, as Iceland does not have a military of its own. An Air Atlanta Icelandic freighter has been chartered and used to deliver military equipment from Slovenia to Ukraine.; Training and equipment: Ikr 50 million worth of basic EOD equipment for the Ukrainian military. Training And Equipping Ukrainian EOD Teams [Since March 2023] (In cooperation with Nordic countries and Lithuania).; Training in combat medicine for Ukrainian soldiers provided by the Greater Reykjavik District Fire and Rescue Service.; Ikr 130 million funding for the Interbow combat medical training programme.; Training for Ukrainian navy cadets by the Icelandic Coast Guard.; Ikr 75 million of uniforms, body armour, medical and hygiene products for female Ukrainian soldiers.; Ikr 500 million funding for training Ukrainian soldiers as part of Operation Legio; A mobile field hospital worth Ikr 1.1 billion purchased for Ukraine March 2023.; Winter gear [2022].; Financial aid: The Government of Iceland has provided Ikr 260 million of economic assistance through the world bank.; €3.55 million for NATO comprehensive assistance package for Ukraine [2022/2023].; Additional €340,000 for NATO comprehensive assistance package for Ukraine December 2023.; €2 million contribution to the production of Ukrainian weapons January 2025.; €2 million worth of IT equipment donated to the Ukrainian military through the IT Coalition April 2025, co financed with Luxembourg.; Ikr 728 million for the UK-led International Fund for Ukraine.; Ikr 622 million for NSATU.; Ikr 945 million for the NATO Comprehensive Assistance Package.; Ikr 800 million for artillery through the Danish model.; Ikr 1.9 billion to the Demining Coalition.; Ikr 1.5 billion to the purchase of Americans weapons for Ukraine.
Ireland	Air defences: Five Giraffe Mark IV radar systems, plus two more for spares. [Jun 2025]; Mine clearing equipment: Two DOK-ING MV-4 remote controlled mine clearance vehicles. [Feb 2023]; Three Reacher demining robots. [Sept 2025]; Vehicles: 20 Ford Ranger pickup trucks, seven transport trucks, two ambulances and one eight-wheeled recovery vehicle donated to the Ukrainian military. [Jun 2024]; 16 Ford rangers, eight Ford Transit minibuses, five 8x8 Scania DROPS trucks, three Mercedes ambulances, and two Ford Transit vans. [Sept 2025]; One Irish Air Corps Rosenbauer fire tender.; Miscellaneous: Helmets, medical equipment, blood and fuel [27 February 2022].; 5,000 Meal, Ready-to-Eat (MREs) [March 2022].; 200 units of body armour. [Mar 2022]; IT equipment for the Ukrainian military through the IT Coalition.; Training and rehabilitation: Rehabilitation of five wounded Ukrainian soldiers [June 2022].; 30 Irish soldiers will participate in training of Ukrainian Armed Forces in basic military skills, leadership training, drill instructor training, combat medicine, demining and explosive disposal. From April 2023 onwards.; Financial aid: €122 million for non-lethal military equipment to be acquired from NATO [Since February 2022].; Additional €100 million for non-lethal military aid allocated March 2025.; Another €100 million in non-lethal military aid announced December 2025.; Further €100 million funding for non-lethal military equipment July 2026.; €10 million funding for the construction of Ukrainian military training facilities.
Israel	Air defence systems In September 2025, Ukrainian sources confirmed that the Armed Forces of Ukraine operate an Israeli-delivered Patriot surface-to-air missile (SAM) system, which had been delivered to Ukraine, along with approximately 90 interceptor missiles that are used by these systems. Anti-drone systems: Unspecified anti-drone systems [September 2022] (delivered by an Israeli defence contractor to Ukraine indirectly through Poland, and the United States); Missile warning system [May 2023].; Vehicles: 7 armoured ambulances [delivered from December 2022 to January 2023]; Small arms: In January 2025, Israel's representatives confirmed that they are about to deliver thousands of Russian-made rockets, rifles, automatic weapons, submachine guns, and other weapons that were seized by the IDF from Hezbollah to Ukraine. These weapons were delivered from Israel's Hatzerim Airbase to Poland's Rzeszów–Jasionka Airport, which serves as the hub for almost all Military Aid provided by the U.S. and NATO to Ukraine, by several USAF Boeing C-17 Globemaster III military transport aircraft.; Military gear: 3,500 helmets [2,000 in April 2022, with a further 1,500 in June]; 2,000 bulletproof vests [500 in April 2022, further 1,500 in June]; 1,000 gas masks [June 2022]; "Hundreds" of mine protection suits [June 2022]; "Dozens" of hazmat filtration systems [June 2022]; Miscellaneous: Intelligence regarding drones used by Russian forces [From November 2022].
Italy	* Private purchases from Italian defence companies Air defence systems (3 batteries): SkyGuard Aspide battery [February 2023].; Spada battery [February 2023].; 2 SAMP/T MAMBA batteries, first [May 2023] (in cooperation with France), second announced June 2024.; Multiple rocket launchers: 2 227mm M270A1 MLRS-Is [October 2022].; Artillery: 6 155mm PzH 2000s SPGs [January 2023].; 100+ 155mm M109L SPGs [delivered from October 2022 onwards].; 155mm FH-70s howitzers [May 2022].; Mortars: 120mm Mod. 63s [before June 2022].; 120mm MO-120-RTs [before December 2022].; Armoured fighting vehicles: Bandvagn BV 206S' [before March 2023].; Puma 6x6 [May 2024].; 10+ VCC-2 (a modified version of the M113A1) [delivered from June 2024 onwards]; Unknown number of Centauro tank destroyers.; Infantry mobility vehicles: VTLM Linces [June 2022] (Some of them equipped with Hitrole RWS).; 11 MLS Shields* [June 2022].; Vehicles: 45 Protezione Civile Iveco VM 90 Tactical Vehicles [2022].; Iveco Astra SM 66.40 trucks (to tow FH-70s) [before November 2022].; IVECO ACM 90 trucks [Spring 2022].; 2 IVECO trakker T380WMs* [July 2022].; 51 FIAT Fullback 4x4 pick-up trucks* (used as mobile MANPADS platforms) [April 2022].; Man-portable air defence systems: FIM-92 Stingers [Spring 2022].; Anti-tank weapons: MILANs [before April 2022].; Panzerfaust 3 RPGs [March 2022 onwards].; Missiles: Storm Shadow Cruise Missiles [before May 2023].; Radars: 1 Skyguard II (for SkyGuard Aspide battery) [February 2023].; 1 Selenia PLUTO 2D (for Spada Battery) [February 2023].; 1 Arabel (for AMP/T MAMBA battery) [May 2023] (in cooperation with France).; Small arms: MG 42/59 general-purpose machine guns [before June 2022].; M2 heavy machine guns [Spring 2022].; Beretta AR70/90 rifles.; Ammunition: 120 mm mortar rounds for Mod. 63 heavy mortars [before June 2022].; 155 mm artillery rounds for towed artillery and SPGs [delivered before November 2022].; 12.7mm rounds for M2 Browning heavy machine guns [Spring 2022].; Military gear: Body armour [2022/2023].; Plate carriers [Spring 2022].; Miscellaneous equipment: Medical supplies [2022/2023].; Meal, Ready-to-Eat (MREs) [2022/2023].; Counter-IED systems [2022/2023].; Hitrole Remote Weapons Stations [June 2022] (For VTLM Lince IMVs).; Financial aid: €110 million funding for the Ukrainian state budget. €1 million in cyber security aid.
Japan	Reconnaissance unmanned aerial vehicles: 30 Parrot ANAFIs [delivered from April 2022 onwards].; ~10 surveillance drones [August 2022].; Vehicles: "Several" vans (for personnel and food transport) [August 2022].; 8 Toyota Hillux pickup trucks (For EOD units) [April 2023].; 6 ISUZU crane trucks (for EOD units) [April 2023].; Toyota high mobility vehicles (part of a batch of 131 vehicles).; Mitsubishi Type 73 light (1/2 ton) jeeps (part of a batch of 131 vehicles).; Morooka rubber track carriers (part of a batch of 131 vehicles).; Military gear: 6,900 Type 88 Version 2 Kai helmets [March 2022].; 1,900 Type 3 Kai bulletproof vests [March 2022].; Military clothing (including field jacket version 2, gloves, boots) [March 2022].; Type 00/Type 18 hazmat suits (including gas masks) [delivered from April 2022 onwards].; Miscellaneous equipment: ALIS mine detection equipment [April 2023].; Communications equipment [March 2022].; Satellite phones [March 2022].; Binoculars [delivered from March 2022 onwards].; 240 tents [March 2022].; Generators [March 2022].; 50 cameras [March 2022].; Lighting devices [March 2022].; Medical equipment, gowns and gloves [March 2022].; 140,000 emergency rations [March 2022 and June 2023].; Protective equipment for pyrotechnicians [April 2023].; A UAV detection system [July 2023]; Rehabilitation: Rehabilitation of two wounded Ukrainian soldiers [to be delivered].; Treatment of wounded Ukrainian soldiers at the Self-Defence Forces Central Hospital and the National Defence Medical College; Financial aid: US$200 million on 28 February 2022.; US$37 million contribution to a NATO fund that will provide an anti-drone system and other gear.; $14,658,000 to the purchase of American non lethal military equipment for Ukraine through PURL.; US$3 billion loan to Ukraine to be paid for with the interest generated from frozen Russian assets announced October 2024.; Additional US$3 billion loan paid for with Russian assets announced June 2025.
Jordan	Between May and November 2022 multiple planes have flown from Jordan to Czech Republic with weapons destined for Ukraine: RPG-32 'Nashshab' rocket launchers [delivered by August 2022].; Missiles for 9K33M2 Osa-AKM air defence system [delivered by April 2023].
Kosovo	Vehicles: Military trucks, "tactical vehicles" and armoured vehicles [May 2024].; Ammunition: 120 mm, 60 mm and 81 mm mortar rounds [to be delivered].; 26 instructors sent to train Ukrainian soldiers as part of British-led Operation Interflex.
Latvia	In January 2024, Latvia pledged a new military aid package to Ukraine, containing: howitzers, 155 mm ammunition, anti-tank weapons, missiles, grenades, helicopters, drones, communication devices, generators, and equipment. Armoured vehicles: 42 Patria 6×6 armoured personnel carriers.; 26 CVR(T) armoured vehicles.; Vehicles: 285 cars (worth almost €1 million), as of January 2023[From March 2023 onwards] (Part of a batch of 1200+ cars donated by Reinis Pozņaks).; 20 additional cars donated August 2024.; 31 additional cars donated March 2025.; 38 additional cars donated 2026.; 32 cars donated by the Latvian State Border Guard to the Ukrainian State Border Guard Service September 2023.; 30 vehicles donated to the Ukrainian National Police October 2023.; 32 police cars and minibuses donated by Latvian police September 2025.; Artillery: 6 M109 howitzers [August 2022].; Helicopters: 2 Mil Mi-8MTV-1 transport helicopters [August 2022].; 2 Mil Mi-2 transport helicopters [August 2022].; 2 Mi-17 helicopters [One in August 2023. One more pledged].; Drones: 90+ unmanned aerial vehicles donated by Latvian companies and delivered to the Armed Forces of Ukraine by the Ministry of Defence of Latvia [from March 2022 onwards].; 45+ AtlasPros (donated by Latvian public and Latvian companies) [May 2022].; Dozens of unmanned aerial vehicles [After January 2023].; 500 Latvian made drones as part of the Drone Coalition [July 2024].; 500 more Latvian made drones as part of the Drone Coalition [August 2024].; €20 million allocated to the Drone Coalition for 2025.; Over 1,000 more Latvian made drones as part of the Drone Coalition [December 2024]; 12,000 Latvian drones delivered in 2025 through the Drone Coalition.; €10 million investment in the Ukrainian drone industry March 2025.; €15 million allocated to the Drone Coalition for 2026.; Air defence systems: Dozens of Stinger anti-aircraft missile systems from the Ministry of Defence of Latvia to the Armed Forces of Ukraine [From February 2022 onwards].; Anti aircraft guns.; Small arms: Dozens of machine guns with ammunition [Spring 2023].; Ammunition: Ammunition for small arms [Spring 2023].; 155mm artillery shells.; €10 million allocated to the Czech artillery shell initiative May 2024.; Miscellaneous equipment: 30 truckloads of individual equipment and supplies (including combat helmets, dried food, medical devices and medicine) from the Latvian National Armed Forces on 26 February 2022.; Body armour [before May 2022].; Spare parts for howitzers [Early 2023].; Meal, ready-to-eat (MREs) [Spring 2023].; Medical supplies [Spring 2023].; 1,000 routers worth €77,000 donated through the IT Coalition.; Training and rehabilitation: Training of 3,000 Ukrainian soldiers [1,000 in 2022; 2,000 to be trained in 2023].; Demining training.; Rehabilitation and treatment of 1,185 Ukrainian personnel at Vostochny Hospital.; Psychological rehabilitation for 98 Ukrainian Border Guard personnel at the Health and Sports Centre of the Ministry of the Interior.; Participation in Operation Interflex.; Financial aid: €500,000 aid from the Riga City Council to Ukraine on 25 February 2022.; €1.2 million aid from the Government of Latvia to the Armed Forces of Ukraine on 26 February 2022.; €4.3 million in support of the Armed Forces through the European Peace Fund.; €17.2 million for the purchase of American made weapons for Ukraine.
Lithuania	In January 2024, Lithuania's Defence Council approved a 200 million euro package of long-term military assistance to Ukraine. Lithuania has provided €769 million worth of military aid since February 2022. Air defence systems: 2 NASAMS launchers.; Up to €30 million for the joint purchase of Patriot air defence systems for Ukraine.; Man-portable air defence systems: FIM-92 Stinger MANPADS [February 2022].; Unspecified MANPADS and missiles announced January 2025.; 30 RBS-70 missiles February 2026.; Anti-aircraft guns: 36 Bofors L70 anti-aircraft guns [delivered from February 2023 onwards].; Aircraft: 2 Mi-8s [before August 2023].; 1 Aero L-39ZA Albatros delivered April 2024.; Artillery: 18 105mm M101 howitzers [September 2022].; 12 120mm Panzermörser M113s [November 2022].; Mortars: 18 120 mm heavy mortars [April 2022].; Armoured fighting vehicles: 72 M113 APCs and M577s [delivered from June 2022 onwards]. More M577s delivered in 2024.; 14 additional M113 APCs delivered June 2024.; Additional M113 APCs delivered September 2024.; M113 spare parts November 2024 and February 2025.; Vehicles: 10 military trucks [June 2022]. Additional trucks February 2025.; 10 Mitsubishi L200s (for demining operations) [June 2022].; Arctic Trucks AT42s [to be delivered].; 7 Toyota Land Cruiser armoured SUVs [October 2022].; 5 Land Rover off-road vehicles [April 2023].; A small number of Renault Trucks D to the Ukrainian military [March 2024].; Repairing of damaged Ukrainian Leopard tanks in Lithuania in cooperation with German defence industry. [October 2023].; At least 5 Magni HTH 27.11 Telehandlers.; All Terrain Vehicles.; €15 million worth of pickup trucks and lorries for the State Transport Special Service and Support Forces Command as part of the Demining Coalition pledged October 2024.; Additional 230 pickup trucks donated to the Ukrainian military as part of the Demining Coalition November 2024.; Tracked vehicle trailers.; Small arms with ammunition: Anti-tank weaponry [March 2022].; 23,000 automatic rifles and machine guns [delivered from March 2022 onwards].; Submachine guns [March 2022].; 4,000 pistols [2022].; ~1,300 grenade launchers [2022].; Grenades [March 2022].; Additional rifles and ammunition [August 2023].; Ammunition: 155 mm artillery rounds for PzH 2000 SPG [delivered from December 2022 onwards].; €35 million towards the Czech purchase of artillery shells for Ukraine [March 2024].; 1.5 million rounds of small arms ammunition delivered September 2023.; 3 million rounds of 7.62×51mm ammunition [November 2023].; Several million small arms ammunition [December 2023].; Thousands of RPG ammunition [December 2023].; "Ammunition" [January 2024].; "Thousands" of rounds of Carl Gustav recoilless rifle ammunition [February 2024].; Radars: Maritime surveillance radar sets [August 2023].; Six Amber-1800 radar systems [May 2024]; Crowdfunded by the Lithuanian public: Radars; 16 ieMHRs [delivered from April 2023 onwards].; Unmanned combat aerial vehicles; 1 Bayraktar TB2 [July 2022] (Initially funded with crowdfunding. Subsequently, given to Lithuania by Baykar Tech free of charge with the €6 million collected used for aid).; Loitering munitions; 37 WB Electronics Warmates [Late 2022] (Crowdfunded through the Lithuanian-Polish Army of Drones crowdfunder).; 18 UJ-23 Topazs [2022/2023].; 3,000 FPV drones pledged 5 April 2024.; €3 million allocated for the production of FPV drones for Ukraine.; 4,500 drones valued at €5 million announced by the Lithuanian government January 2025.; €10 million allocated by the Lithuanian government to finance the production of Palianytsia drone missiles.; Reconnaissance unmanned aerial vehicles; 7 EOS C VTOL [June 2022] (Two crowdfunded in early May and five more purchased with the money collected from the TB2 crowdfunder).; Drone-related equipment; Cloud intelligence collaboration suite 'Magyla 700' [to be delivered] (purchased with the money collected from the TB2 crowdfunder. For EOS C VTOL UAVs).; 110+ EDM4S Sky Wiper anti-drone jammers [July 2022] (purchased with the money collected from the TB2 crowdfunder. To be used with 80 WINGMAN early-warning drone detectors).; Miscellaneous equipment: 35,000 sets of military winter clothing [delivered from September 2022 onwards].; Winter clothing and equipment to equip "tens of thousands" of soldiers [February 2024].; Anti-drone imaging equipment [March or April 2022 and June 2022].; Thermal imagers [March or April 2022, June 2022,January 2025 and February 2025].; Communications equipment [March 2022].; At least several tens of thousands of dry food rations (MREs) [April, December 2023].; Reconnaissance unmanned aerial vehicles [to be delivered].; Anti-drone systems August 2023. Additional systems April 2024.; Drones; Winter equipment.; Remote detonation systems.; About 1000 folding beds.; "Field service equipment" [December 2023].; "Outdoor equipment" [December 2023].; Generators [January 2024]. [April 2024]; "Detonation systems" [January 2024].; RISE-1 remote detonation systems [February 2024].; Camp beds.; Laptops; 240 mine detectors [November 2024]; Training and rehabilitation: Training of Ukrainian soldiers since 2017 (4,000 trained between 2017 and 2021, 500 soldiers in 2022, 2,000 to be trained in 2023). Training will continue in 2024.; 25 instructors as part of Operation Interflex.; 40 instructors as part of EUMAM Ukraine; Rehabilitation of wounded Ukrainian soldiers [since 2016].; €15 million allocated for rehabilitation programmes for wounded Ukrainian soldiers.; Financial aid: €29 million in military equipment by the Blue/Yellow charity since 2014.; €63.6 funding for the purchase of American made weapons for Ukraine.
Luxembourg	Luxembourg has provided over €250 million worth of military support to Ukraine since February 2022. Artillery: €5 million towards the purchase of a CAESAR self-propelled howitzer for Ukraine.; Armoured personnel carriers: 40 M113 Armoured Personnel Carriers with Remote Weapon Stations as a joint donation by Belgium, the Netherlands and Luxembourg [delivered from September 2023 onwards].; Reconnaissance unmanned aerial vehicles: 15 Primoco one 150s [6 in August 2022; 9 in 2023] (purchased directly from the manufacturer in Czechia; six in cooperation with the Netherlands and Belgium).; Anti-tank weapons: 102 NLAWs [March 2022].; Infantry mobility vehicles: 28 HMMWVs [November 2022] (eight for spare parts).; Vehicles: Seven Jeep Wranglers [March 2022].; Four pickup trucks and 4 trailers [August 2022] (for the Primoco One 150 UAV unit).; A Mercedes Sprinter L4 Van [August 2022] (For the Primoco One 150 UAV Unit).; Eight ambulances [December 2022].; 30 armoured ambulances [delivered since March 2023].; Small arms: 20 M2 Browning heavy machine guns [November 2022].; 10 FN MAG general-purpose machine guns [March 2023].; Ammunition: 600 122 mm rockets for BM-21 Grad [between September and October 2022] (bought from a third country and delivered to Ukraine).; 12,500 rounds of RPG-7 ammunition [April 2022] (bought from a third country and delivered to Ukraine).; 3,200 rounds of 155 mm ammunition [March 2023].; 3.22 million rounds of 12.7 mm ammunition [March 2022 and 2023].; 100,000 rounds of 7.62x51mm mm ammunition [March 2023].; Procurement of 155 mm ammunition through European Defence Agency.; Unspecified contribution to the Czech purchase of artillery shells for Ukraine.; Drones: €3 million to the Latvian-led Drone Coalition.; £3 million additional contribution to the Drone Coalition announced by the British MoD November 2024.; Military clothing: 5,000 bulletproof vests [May 2022] (purchased off the international market).; 5,800 helmets [May 2022 and 2023] (purchased off the international market).; 22,400 Avon Protection C50 gas masks [between April and June 2022] (delivered along with 44,800 filters, purchased directly from the manufacturer).; Miscellaneous equipment: 120 MUM night vision multi-purpose monoculars [August 2022].; 180 PVS-14 night vision multi-purpose monoculars [August 2022].; 70 RNVG night vision binoculars [August 2022].; 100 thermal scopes for rifles [August 2022]; 300 mounts night vision helmet mounts [August 2022].; 150 Night vision goggles [2023].; 25 SOPHIE hand-held thermal cameras [March 2023].; Medical supplies [2022/2023].; 50 Satcube Ku terminals with iDirect iQ 200 modems and SATCOM subscription [between July and October 2022] (purchased directly from the manufacturer).; 40 SATCOM terminals including bandwidth [March 2023].; 15 military tents [March 2022].; 358 Arctic sleeping bags [September 2022].; 18 generators [November 2022].; 47 heavy and medium generators [March, April and May 2023].; 3 portable army heaters [September 2022].; 10 light-pole sets [November 2022].; 800 Meal, Ready-to-Eat (MREs) [September 2022].; 43 Artec 3D scanners [November 2022 and 2023] (to investigate Russian war crimes).; €7.5 million worth of IT equipment through the IT Coalition co-financed with the Netherlands February 2025. Further equipment delivered August 2025.; Funding: €10 million to support the Ukrainian defence sector announced May 2025.; €56.33 million contribution to the purchase of American weapons for Ukraine.
Malta	Treatment: Treatment of two wounded Ukrainian soldiers [January 2023].
Montenegro	In February 2023, Montenegro announced that it had donated military aid worth €10 million. Man-portable air defence systems: 226 9K32 Strela-2Ms [first ten in April 2022, further 216 on 25 July 2022].; Ammunition: 600 rounds of 60mm and 82mm ammunition for mortars [sent between April and June 2022].; 7,964 rounds of 57mm ammunition for UB-16 and UB-32 rocket pods [August 2022].; 8,036 rounds of 57mm ammunition for 57mm AZP S-60 AA guns [July and August 2022].; 7,992 rounds of 76mm ammunition for 76mm AK-726 naval guns [August 2022].; 2.3 million rounds of 7.62×39mm ammunition [August 2022].; Military clothing and gear: 500 helmets [March 2022].; 300 bulletproof vests [March 2022].; 600 armoured plates [March 2022].; Miscellaneous equipment and training: Mi-8 helicopter spare parts [September 2022].; 7,000 food rations [March 2022].; participation in EUMAM Ukraine and NSATU.; The government of Montenegro announced that it would donate 11% of its defence budget to Ukraine.
Morocco	Spare parts for T-72 tanks [December 2022, alleged].; 20 T0-72B tanks modernized by Czech company Excalibur Army [January 2023, alleged].; Donations are disputed by the government of Morocco.
Netherlands	Fighter jets: 42 F-16 Fighting Falcon fighter jets pledged 20 August 2023 [to be delivered from 2024 onwards] (Some held back in the Netherlands for the training of Ukrainian pilots).; €150 million worth of F-16 Fighting Falcon fighter jet munitions purchased from manufacturers.; Additional €300 million worth of F-16 munitions pledged July 2024.; €80 million of maintenance equipment and materials as well air-to-air missiles for Ukrainian F-16 fighters pledged 6 September 2024.; Training for 26 Ukrainian F-16 ground crew chiefs.; Naval vessels: Two Alkmaar-class minehunters, Vlaardingen and Makkum.; Four ''Ships'' [to be delivered].; 31 "RHIBs/FRISCs/Boston Whalers" [2022/2023].; Over 100 fast patrol boats and special forces vessels.; Anti-ship missiles: AGM-84 Harpoon (Missiles) [June 2022].; Air defence systems: 2 Patriot Launchers [April 2023].; Missiles For The Patriot SAM Launchers [April 2023]. Additional missiles pledged October 2023.; 12 AIM-120 AMRAAMs (For NASAMS II) [November 2022].; €150 million pledged towards the purchase of MIM-23 Hawk air defence systems April 2025.; Mobile anti-aircraft guns: 100 MR-2 Mobile Anti-Aircraft Guns [to be delivered] (purchased by the Netherlands from Czechia, upgraded and delivered to Ukraine).; 20 Bofors 40L70s [delivered from March 2023 onwards].; Artillery: 8 155mm PzH 2000s SPGs [April 2022. Training completed in May 2022. Arrived to Ukraine from June 2022 onwards].; 9 155mm DITA SPGs [announced in February 2024]; 6 additional DITA pledged October 2024.; Armoured fighting vehicles: 45 T-72 Avenger [deliveries starting in December 2022] (purchased from Czech company Excalibur Army, upgraded and delivered directly to Ukraine).; 33 out of 100+ Leopard 1A5s [to be delivered] (In cooperation with Germany and Denmark).; 7 out of 14 Leopard 2A4s [to be delivered] (In cooperation with Denmark).; 9+ Fenneks [delivered by the end of 2023].; 337+ YPR-765s.; Additional 25 YPR-765 armoured ambulance versions pledged February 2025.; 28 Bandvagn BvS 10s [delivered before March 2023].; 40 M113 armoured personnel carriers with Remote Weapon Stations as a joint donation by Belgium, the Netherlands and Luxembourg.; €400 million towards the Swedish-Danish initiative to purchase Combat Vehicle 90 Infantry Fighting Vehicles for Ukraine.; Engineering vehicles and equipment: 1 Scanjack 3500 mine clearing system [2022/2023].; 3 Bozena mine clearing systems [2022/2023].; 6 Mine rollers For BMP IFVs [2023].; 9 Mine plows [2023].; 5 Brückenlegepanzer Biber bridgelayers [June 2023].; 6 M3 amphibious bridging vehicles [to be delivered].; 24 Bailey bridges [2023].; 1000 portable mine-clearing charges [delivered from 2023 onwards].; 5 YPR-806 armoured recovery vehicle [to be delivered].; Vehicles [2022/2023]: ~300 DAF YA-4442 '4-tonner' trucks and DAF YAZ-2300 '10-tonner' trucks [delivered from November 2022 onwards].; Mercedes Benz 290GD ambulances.; Volkswagen Amarok SUVs.; 19 lifting cranes.; 25 loaders.; 29 forklifts.; 5 side loaders.; Motorcycles.; 6 Toyota Landcruiser ambulances.; 60 Toyota hilux pickup trucks to the Unmanned Systems Force.; 20 Ermine casevac unmanned ground vehicle.; Heavy mortars: 12 120mm MO-120-HBs.; Man-portable air defence systems: 50 FIM-92 Stinger launchers [delivered from March 2022 onwards].; 200 Stinger missiles [April 2022].; Reconnaissance and armed unmanned aerial vehicles: 164 unmanned aerial vehicles [From April or May 2022 onwards].; DeltaQuad Pro VTOLs [before June 2023].; 6 Primoco One 150s [2023] (In cooperation with Luxembourg and Belgium).; €200 million of Intelligence, Surveillance and Reconnaissance drones purchased alongside partner nations.; €20 million of FPV drones pledged June 2024.; €22.5 million of drones purchased from Dutch manufacturers pledged June 2024.; €20 million towards the purchase of FPV drones for the Ukrainian military as part of the Drone Coalition July 2025.; Additional €80 million towards the purchase of drones through the Drone Coalition June 2025.; €400 million allocated to the development and purchase of drones for the Ukrainian military by Dutch and Ukrainian companies, including €42.6 for the purchase of DeltaQuad Intelligence, Surveillance & Reconnaissance drones announced October 2024.; €500 million funding for a large scale drone project for the Ukrainian military March 2025.; Further €90 million funding for Ukrainian drone production October 2025.; €200 million of anti drone systems October 2025.; €248 million allocated for drones for Ukraine announced April 2026.; €250 million for Dutch made drones for Ukraine announced June 2026.; Unmanned underwater vehicles: 2 SeaFox autonomous mine-detecting underwater vehicles [March or April 2022].; €17.5 of maritime drones purchased from Ukrainian industry pledged June 2024.; Radars: 5 AN/TPQ-36 Firefinder weapon-locating radars [delivered from April 2022 onwards].; 2 Thales Squire ground surveillance radars [delivered from April 2022 onwards].; ''Several'' anti-drone radars [to be delivered].; 4 VERA-NG anti-stealth radar systems [to be delivered].; 51 mobile radars for drone detection pledged August 2024.; 100 drone detection radars.; Small arms: 50 Panzerfaust 3 RPGs [delivered from March 2022 onwards].; 144+ M72 LAW RPGs [2022 and 2023].; 10 Barrett M82 anti-materiel rifles [March 2022].; 19 Barrett M99 anti-materiel rifles.; 90 Accuracy International AX308 sniper rifles [March 2022].; 56 MG3 general-purpose machine guns.; FN MAG general-purpose machine guns [2022/2023].; 111 million euros worth of FN MAG general-purpose machine guns [to be delivered].; FN Minimi light machine guns [2022/2023].; M2 heavy machine guns [2022/2023].; C7A1 assault rifles [before September 2022].; 629+ HK416 assault rifles; 83 Mossberg 590 shotguns.; 1,715+ Glock 17 pistols.; Ammunition: 400 DM72A1 (PzF 3-IT) rounds for Panzerfaust 3 [March 2022].; 30,000 rounds of 7.62mm and 12.7mm ammunition [March 2022] (For AX408 and M82 sniper and anti-materiel rifles).; Small arms ammunition (for C7A1 assault rifles, Glock 17 pistols, FN MAG, FN Minimi and M2 machine guns) [2022].; 20,000 rounds of 120 mm ammunition for the Leopard 2 [to be delivered].; 155 mm artillery rounds for the PzH 2000 SPG [2022/2023].; M982 Excalibur guided artillery rounds for PzH 2000 SPG [2022/2023].; "Ammunition for helicopters" [2022/2023].; €100 million towards the Czech led initiative to purchase artillery shells for Ukraine.; Additional €271 million towards the Czech led initiative to purchase artillery shells for Ukraine announced October 2024.; Military gear: 3,000 Gevechtshelm Composiet M95 helmets [March or April 2022].; STRONG helmets [June 2022].; 2,000 flak jackets [March or April 2022 and June 2022].; Explosive Ordnance Disposal (EOD) Gear [2022].; Night-vision equipment [2022].; 30 hand-held mine detectors [March 2022].; €35 million allocated for medical supplies and personal equipment through NATO's Comprehensive Assistance Package.; Miscellaneous equipment [2022/2023]: 12 field hospitals (in cooperation with Estonia and Norway).; 5 mobile field hospitals donated to the Ukrainian State Border Guard Service [July–October 2023]; 3 additional mobile field hospitals donated to the Ukrainian State Border Guard Service [December 2023]; 31 field kitchens.; 769 generators.; 1800 tents.; Sleeping bags.; Fuel.; Spare parts.; Meal, Ready-to-Eat (MREs).; Medical supplies.; 2 Explosive Ordnance Disposal (EOD) Trucks [before February 2023].; Explosive Ordnance Disposal (EOD) Kits.; Funding and training: 90 instructors training Ukrainian soldiers as part of Operation Interflex.; €22 million in funding to NATO projects improving Ukrainian air defence and cyber security announced December 2024.; €7 million in funding for NATO's Ukraine Comprehensive Assistance Package to provide non lethal support to the Ukrainian Armed Forces January 2025.; €20 million funding for the Maritime Regional Training Centre for Ukrainian marines in Romania.; €1 billion contribution for the purchase of American weapons for Ukraine.; €10 million funding for the UK led Ukraine cyber security programme.; €10 million funding or military training facilities in Ukraine.
New Zealand	Military gear: 473 helmets [March 2022].; 1,066 bullet-proof vests [March 2022].; 571 camouflage vests [March 2022].; Miscellaneous equipment: 40 dial sights [May 2022].; Training: On 23 May 2022, it was announced that 30 New Zealand Defence Force personnel would travel to the UK to train Ukrainian troops on L119 Light Gun howitzers.; On 15 August 2022, the New Zealand government announced it would send 120 NZDF personnel to train Ukrainian forces in the UK. The deployment would consists of two teams of infantry trainers and lasts until 30 November.; On 14 November 2022, the New Zealand government announced it would continue the deployment of infantry trainers (on a reduced basis of a single team of 66 personnel) and intelligence staff until 31 July 2023 and 30 June 2023.; On 3 May 2023, the New Zealand government announced it would extend the deployment of the New Zealand Defence Force personnel training and supporting the Ukrainian armed forces until 30 June 2024.; On 22 February 2024, the New Zealand government announced it would extend the deployment of the New Zealand Defence Force personnel training and supporting the Ukrainian armed forces until June 2025.; Logistics: Contributing a C-130H Hercules and No. 40 Squadron RNZAF personnel to UK-based European military airlift operations for two months.; Financial aid: Pledge of NZ$5 million partially for the purchase of non-lethal military equipment through NATO announced on 21 March 2022.; NZ$7.5 million for weapons and ammunition procurement by the UK.; NZ$4.1 million towards providing commercial satellite access for Ukrainian intelligence.; On 27 June 2022, the New Zealand government announced it will donate NZ$4.5 million to NATO's trust fund to buy non-lethal military equipment, as well as deploying an additional six NZDF intelligence analysts to the UK, totalling twelve, until 30 November.; NZ$1.85 million to the NATO Trust Fund for the acquisition of non-lethal military equipment and supplies November 2022; A further NZ$6.5 million for weapons and ammunition procurement was announced February 2024; NZ$2 million towards Ukrainian military healthcare July 2024.; NZ$8 million towards the Latvian led Drone Coalition.; NZ$4 million funding for NSATU.; NZ$15 million funding for the purchase of Americans weapons for the purchase of American weapons for Ukraine.
North Macedonia	Pledged military equipment and material to Ukraine on 1 March 2022. Most of the military aid was done in July or August 2022. Fighter jets: Four Su-25 ground attack jets.; Helicopters: 12 Mi-24 attack helicopters [to be delivered].; Tanks: 31 T-72A tanks.; Artillery: "Artillery" [2022].; Anti-aircraft weapons: "Anti-aircraft weapons systems" [2022].; Air-to-air missiles: R-60MK Short-Range AAMs (For Su-27 and MiG-29 fighter jets).; Aircraft weaponry: UB-32, B-8, and S-13 rocket pods (for Su-25, Mi-8/17 and Mi-24).; SPPU-22-1 gun pods (for Su-25).; Aviation bombs (FAB-100/250 and OFAB-250) (for Su-25).; Anti-tank weaponry: M80 Zolja rocket-propelled grenade launchers [2022].; Small arms: Zastava M70 assault rifles [2022].; "Infantry weapons" [2022].; Ammunition: 57mm S-5 rockets for UB-32 rocket pods (for Su-25, Mi-8/17 and Mi-24).; 80mm S-8 rockets for B-8 rocket pods (for Su-25, Mi-8/17 and Mi-24).; 122mm S-13 rockets for B-13 rocket pods (for Su-25, Mi-8/17 and Mi-24).; 240mm S-24 rockets (for Su-25, Mi-8/17 and Mi-24).; 30 mm ammunition (for Su-25).; 125 mm rounds (for T-72 MBT).; Small arms ammunition [before March 2023].; Miscellaneous equipment: Su-25, Mi-24, and T-72 spare parts and support equipment [Mi-24 to be delivered].; Training and funding: First batch of Ukrainian recruits trained in North Macedonia completed November 2023.; $1 million funding for the purchase of American made weapons for Ukraine.
Norway	Fighter jets: 6 F-16A/Bs [to be delivered].; Surface-to-air missile systems: 2 NASAMS firing units [November 2022]. Two Fire Distribution Centres, two launchers and spare parts [July 2023]. In total 4 NASAMS firing units, 4 fire-control centres for the NASAMS and spare parts for the NASAMS pledged [to be delivered].; "Significant numbers" of air defence missiles for Ukrainian NASAMS January 2026.; IRIS-T anti aircraft missiles (For IRIS-T SLS SAM Systems donated by Germany) [August 2023].; NOK 1.2 billion worth of air defences purchased from the United States pledged February 2025.; S-300 air defence missiles pledged December 2025.; NOK 3 billion for air defences pledged July 2026.; Multiple rocket launchers: 11 M270 MLRS (Delivered to the United Kingdom to allow the British Army to transfer eleven more modern M270B1s to Ukraine).; Atillery: 23 155mm M109A3GNs [22 in May 2022, 1 in November 2022] (Delivered along with ammunition).; 5 (Out Of 16) 155mm ShKH Zuzana 2s [delivered from July 2023 onwards] (joint purchase by Germany, Norway and Denmark).; Armoured fighting vehicles: 8 Leopard 2A4s [delivered March 2023].; Dingo 2s equipped with CORTEX Typhon RWSs.; Infantry mobility vehicles: 14 Iveco LAV IIIs [October 2022].; Man-portable air defence systems: 100 Mistral 2s [April 2022].; Naval vessels coastal defence missiles: Hellfire shore defence systems [Late 2022].; CB90 assault craft.; Radars: 3 ARTHUR counter-battery radars [delivered by August 2023].; Unmanned aerial vehicles: 850 Black Hornet Nanos, joint purchase from UK and Norway [August 2022]. 1000 new dronekits to be provided [July 2023].; 3 Aeryon SkyRanger R60s [delivered from April 2022 onwards] (Donated by Veteran Aid Ukraine).; 10 DJI Mavic 2/3s [delivered from April 2022 onwards] (Donated by Veteran Aid Ukraine).; Engineering vehicles and equipment: 2 NM217 (Bergepanzer 2) armoured recovery vehicles [delivered in March 2023].; 3 NM189 Ingeniørpanservogn armoured engineering vehicles [delivered in March 2023].; 51 NM199 (M548) tracked cargo carriers [September 2023].; Scania P92 trucks with crane [Confirmed delivered in January 2023].; Scania P113 trucks with hook lift [Confirmed delivered in January 2023].; Demining equipment [August 2023].; Anti-tank weaponry and small arms: 50 rifles.; 55 submachine guns.; 4,000 NM72F1 and EC (M72 LAW) [March and April 2022].; Electronic warfare equipment: Cortex Typhon counter UAV systems worth NOK 740 million (mounted on Dingo 2s).; Ammunition: 10,000 155mm Nammo NM28 artillery rounds for M109A3GN SPG [delivered since May 2022].; 160 AGM-114 Hellfires [delivered by August 2023].; 24,000 155 mm artillery shells [to be delivered], in cooperation with Denmark, who will provide fuzes, propellant bags and primer cartridges.; NOK 1.6 billion towards the Czech purchase of artillery shells for Ukraine.; Further NOK 4 billion towards the Czech purchase of artillery shells for Ukraine for 2025.; NOK 1 billion for the purchase of artillery shells for Ukraine through the European peace facility in 2025.; NOK 480 of 81mm mortar rounds.; NOK 50 million of hand grenades.; NOK 3 million of sniper ammunition.; NOK 3.2 billion of F-16 and air defence munitions pledged December 2025.; $190 million allocated to purcahse artillery shells for Ukraine allocated July 2026.; Military clothing: 5,000 helmets 'HJELM' [February 2022].; 1,500 bulletproof vests [February 2022].; 55,000 pieces of winter clothing [November 2022].; 1,000 gas masks [February 2022].; Night vision goggles [July or August 2022].; Miscellaneous equipment: 55,000 bandages [November 2022].; Thermal binoculars [July or August 2022].; 45,000 Meal, Ready-to-Eat (MREs) [February and November 2022].; 280,000 MREs [July 2023]; 2,000 sleeping bags [February 2022].; 10,000 sleeping pads [February 2022].; 20,000 pieces of spare parts for the M109A3GN SPG [February 2022].; 1 field hospital [to be delivered] (In cooperation with Estonia and The Netherlands).; NOK 60 million worth of 130 inflatable boats 2024.; Spare parts for Ukrainian Westland Sea King helicopters.; Medical equipment donated to the Ukrainian military including medical instrument carts, operating tables and lamps, artery clamps, a suction device, emergency bags with sanitary equipment, anatomical and surgical tweezers, drills and wound hooks [February 2024].; Seven specialized military ambulance buses with medical supplies donated to the Ukrainian Armed Forces and State Border Guard service as part of NATO's Comprehensive Assistance Package for Ukraine.; Training: 150 instructors as part of Operation Interflex.; Financial aid: €36.5 million to equip the Ukrainian military through the European Peace Facility; NOK 150 million for maintenance of Ukrainian Leopard 2 tanks at a maintenance centre in Poland.; Partial funding for technology transfer between Nammo and Ukraine for the establishment of licensed production of 155mm artillery shells in Ukraine.; Additional NOK 570 million allocated to the British led fund to purchase drones and air defences to Ukraine September 2024.; NOK 800 million allocated to the Maritime Capability Coalition.; Up to NOK 1.3 billion for the procurement of munitions and spare parts for Ukrainian F-16s.; unspecified funding for the training of Ukrainian pilots and ground crews for 2025.; NOK 2.7 billion package in support of the Ukrainian Navy with mine clearance and protection of infrastructure and population from attacks from the Black Sea, includes NOK 130 million allocated for maritime training and NOK 150 million for the purchase of small vessels.; NOK 6.7 billion allocated to support the Ukraine Maritime Coalition for 2025.; NOK 10 billion allocated for the training and equipping of a brigade worth of Ukrainian soldiers announced April 2025.; NOK 12.5 billion contribution to the purchase of American weapons for Ukraine.; NOK 1.2 billion funding for development and procurement of Norwegian and Ukrainian USVs.
Pakistan	Munitions purchased by third parties and delivered to Ukraine. Drones: Kamikaze drones [February 2024].; Man-portable air defence systems: unspecified number of Anza Mark-II [Planned].; Anti-tank weapons: 30,000 40mm RPG-7 high-explosive anti-tank (HEAT) rounds.; Ammunition: 50,000 POF made 122 mm artillery shells [August 2022].; 20,000 122 mm high-explosive (HE) artillery shells [2023].; 60,000 155 mm HOW high-explosive (HE) M107 artillery shells [delivered from January 2023 onwards]. (delivered along with M4A2 propelling bag charges, M-82 primers and PDM fuses); 130 mm artillery shells [2023].; 125 mm tank shells [February 2024].; 130,000 122mm rockets.; 122mm Yarmuk HE-Frag rockets [delivered by March 2023].; 25mm ammunition.; 25,000 120mm high-explosive (HE) mortar bombs [delivered by March 2023].; 12.7×99mm bullets for heavy machine guns [2023].; 7.62×54mm bullets for rifles and machine guns [2023].; 12.7×108mm bullets for heavy machine guns [2023].; Tonnage of deliveries: 146 containers with ammunition [January 2023].; 162 containers with ammunition, including 10,000 Grad rockets [February 2023].; 137 containers with ammunition delivered [March 2023].; 230 containers with ammunition [April 2023].; Donations are disputed by the government of Pakistan and Ukraine.
Poland	Fighter jets (14): 14 MiG-29s [Four in April and ten in May 2023].; Helicopters (15): 12 Mi-24 [July 2023].; 2 MI-8 [December 2024].; 1 Bell 412-HP [December 2024].; Armoured fighting vehicles: 250+ T-72M and T-72M1(R)s [delivered from April 2022 onwards].; 14 Leopard 2A4s [4 in February 2023, 10 in March 2023].; 60 PT-91s [delivered from April 2023 onwards].; 142 BWP-1s IFVs [delivered from April 2022 onwards].; 200 KTO Rosomaks* IFVs [delivered from July 2023 onwards] (purchased by Ukraine with EU and US funding).; Infantry mobility vehicles: AMZ Dzik-2 [May 2022].; Command vehicles: LPG WDSzs [June 2022] (Command vehicle for the AHS Krab SPG).; Artillery: 24 120mm M120 Raks* [delivered by December 2023] (purchased by Ukraine with EU and US funding).; 20+ 122mm 2S1 Goździks [April 2022].; 18 155mm AHS Krabs [delivered from June 2022 onwards].; 54 155mm AHS Krabs* [delivered from late 2022 onwards] (purchased by Ukraine with EU funding).; Multiple rocket launchers (20+): 20+ 122mm BM-21 Grads [April 2022].; Anti-aircraft guns: AZP S-60s [Early 2023].; Zu-23-2CP autocannons [delivered by February 2024]; ZSU-23-4 Shilkas [before March 2023].; ZU-23-2 Hibneryt [October 2023].; Surface-to-air missile systems: S-125 Newa SCs [November 2022].; 9K33 Osa-AK(M)s [December 2022].; Osa-AKM-P1 Żądłos [January 2023].; Air-to-air missiles (100): 100 R-73s (For Su-27 and MiG-29 fighter jets) [February 2022].; Unmanned combat aerial vehicles (1): 1 Bayraktar TB2** [Late 2022] (Crowdfunded by Polish citizens. Subsequently, given to Ukraine by Baykar Tech free of charge with the €5 million collected used for aid).; Reconnaissance unmanned aerial vehicles (20+): 20+ WB Electronics FlyEyes [February or March 2022 and August 2022] (An initial batch was delivered by the Polish Armed Forces with 20 more FlyEyes crowdfunded through the Lithuanian–Polish Army of Drones crowdfunder).; 10 Reconnaissance drones donated to the 7th Carpathian Border Detachment.; Loitering munitions (53): 53 WB Electronics Warmates [Late 2022 onwards] (43 crowdfunded through the Lithuanian–Polish Army of Drones crowdfunder. An additional 10 examples donated by the manufacturer WB Group).; Man portable air defence systems (260): 260 PPZR Pioruns [160 delivered in February 2022. 100 more purchased by Ukraine in April 2023].; Trucks and sport utility vehicles: Star 266s [before September 2022].; Star 266M2s [before October 2022].; Jelcz P882 D53s [before April 2023].; Nine Renault Dusters to the Ukrainian Border Guard Service.; Two SUVs and three generators to Border Guard Bohdan Khmelnytskyi National Academy.; Mortars: 100 60mm LMP-2017 light mortars [February 2022] (Delivered along with at least 1,500 mortar rounds).; Small arms: Kbk wz.1988 Tantal assault rifles [June 2022].; Kbk AKMS assault rifles [before October 2022].; FB MSBS Grot C16A2 assault rifles* [May 2022] (Additional batches purchased by Ukraine in 2023 with EU funding).; UKM-2000P machine guns [June 2022].; ZMT WKW 50 anti-materiel rifles [June 2022].; RGP-40 grenade launchers [February 2022].; RPG-76s rocket-propelled grenades [March 2022].; "Thousands" of machine guns and millions of rounds of ammunition delivered to Ukraine on 26 June 2023.; Ammunition: ''Large quantities'' of 120 mm OF-NMR HE-FRAG ammunition for mortars [before November 2022].; ''Large quantities'' of 122 mm OF-462 HE Ammunition for 2S1 SPGs [Since February 2022].; ''Large quantities'' of 152 mm ammunition for artillery [Since February 2022].; ''Large quantities'' of 125 mm ammunition for T-72 tanks [Since February 2022].; 30,000+ rounds of 5.56×45mm and 23 mm ammunition [February 2022].; 73mm PG-9 ammunition for SPG-9 recoilless guns [February or March 2022].; Protective gear: 42,000 WZ 2005 helmets [February 2022].; Training and rehabilitation: Training of Ukrainian soldiers [since July 2016].; Treatment of more than 100 wounded soldiers [from 2022 onwards].; Deployment: 98 Polish police officers participated in demining of Ukrainian territory from Summer 2022 for five months.; Financial aid: 4 billion Złoty (US$875 million) was offered by the National Bank of Poland to Ukraine on the as a currency swap.; $100 million funding for American weapon purchases for Ukraine.
Portugal	Main battle tanks: 3 Leopard 2A6NL [March 2023]; Armoured personnel carriers: 4 Iveco M 40.12 WM/P [April 2022]; 57 M113 armoured personnel carriers "and respective weaponry":14 [July 2022], 14 [2nd trimester 2023], 14 3rd trimester 2024] and 15 [2nd trimester 2025]; 3 M113 Medical version [4th trimester 2023]; 2 M577 medical version [4th trimester 2023] + additional [2nd trimester 2025]; Helicopters: 6 Kamov Ka-32A11BC [August–September 2024].; 8 Aérospatiale SA 330 Puma [4th trimester 2024]; Unmanned aerial vehicles: 6 unmanned aerial vehicles [2nd trimester 2022]; Unmanned surveillance and reconnaissance aerial vehicles [Before April 2023]; Tekever AR5 unmanned aerial vehicles [2024]; Unmanned aerial vehicles worth €52 million [to be delivered]; Speedboats: 8 high-speed boats; 3 [3rd trimester 2024], 2 additional [3rd trimester 2025], 3 additional [to be delivered]; Small arms: 1000 H&K G3 rifles [February or March 2022]; Grenades including m/963 grenades [February or March 2022]; Heavy machine guns [2nd trimester 2022]; 42 M2HB Brownings machine guns [2022 and 2023].; Light weapons [May 2022]; Grenade launchers [1st trimester 2024]; Artillery: 9 105mm M101A1 howitzers [2nd trimester 2024]; 155mm howitzers [1st trimester 2025]; 4 M114A1 howitzers [December 2025]; Mortars: Unspecified quantity of mortars [April and May 2022]; Unspecified quantity of 60mm mortars [3rd trimester 2023]; 19 sub 100mm calibre mortars [2023]; Ammunition: Ammunition of different calibres [February or March 2022 and April and May 2022]; Ammunition of different calibres including 7.62mm, 60mm and 120mm calibres [1st trimester 2023]; 120mm ammunition, including 2,000 mortar rounds as of March 2023 [before January 2023] [To be delivered]; 105mm ammunition [3rd trimester 2023] additional 180 tons of shells announced May 2023; 155mm artillery M107 rounds [Before July 2023]; Miscellaneous equipment: Bulletproof vests, helmets, night-vision devices, portable radios, and analogue repeaters [February or March 2022].; Sanitary and medical equipment [February or March 2022].; 50 additional radios [July 2022].; Medical kits [May and June 2022]. with 700 more delivered [July 2022].; Eight (62/200KvA) [1st trimester 2023] and four (150KvA) [4th trimester 2024]; Demining equipment [1st trimester 2024].; 25,000 items of clothing/uniforms, mainly women's military winter clothing, including 5000 pairs of underwear, 5000 tops and 5000 neck mufflers [4th Trimester 2024].; Uniforms and boots. [1st trimester 2024].; Thousands Of Sleeping Bags And Thermal Blankets [2022/2023].; Military training: Explosive ordinance disposal, medical and nuclear, biological, chemical and radiological defence training in Germany February 2023. Within the framework of the European Union Military Assistance Mission to Ukraine, Portugal had a first group of three military observers in February 2023 and as of April 2023 five military personnel had provided medical military in Germany.; Training in the use of the F-16 Fighting Falcons, including air traffic controllers and maintenance crews and the use and repair of Leopard 2 tanks.; Around 150 Ukrainian soldiers trained by Portuguese forces in 2023.; Between February and March 2024, teams of six military personnel provided infantry training along with 20 for unexploded ordinance disposal training.; Financial aid: €8-10 million contribution to the €450 to €500 million EU package of military support to the Ukrainian Armed Forces, announced on 28 February 2022.; €250 million in financial aid to Ukraine 2023.; €1 million for non lethal military aid through NATO.; €1 million to the procurement of 155mm ammunition through European Defence Agency [to be delivered]; €100 million in funding towards the Czech government initiative to purchase artillery shells for Ukraine.; €300 million contribution for the new €20 billion additional support package prepared by the European Council.; €20.5 million funding for satellite imagery and SAR data to the Ukrainian military.; €954,603 funding for the training of Ukrainian F-16 pilots through the Air Force Coalition.; €50 million contribution for the purchase of American weapons for Ukraine.; €10 million contribution to the Drone Coalition.; €125 million contribution for the purchase of military equipment through SAFE program.; €100 million euros for air defences through NATO's PURL program.; 1,100 tons of military aid delivered by September 2023.
Romania	* Purchases by the Ukrainian or EU governments from Romanian defence companies Romania has provided 23 military aid packages to Ukraine. Armoured fighting vehicles: 20 TAB-71M [2022–2023].; Artillery: 152 mm M1981 [May 2023].; Multiple rocket launchers: APR-40 MLRS [May 2023].; Air defence systems: Patriot battery [3 October 2024].; CA-95 [before March 2025].; Machine guns: DShK [December 2022].; Ammunition: Undisclosed type of ammunition [February 2022].; Procurement of 155 mm ammunition through European Defence Agency [to be delivered].; Grad rockets [deliveries ongoing as of April 2023].; Ammunition for RPG-7, SPG-9, DShK, as well as mortar bombs and 122 mm shells and rockets purchased by the Ukrainian or EU governments from Romanian defence companies: 12.7mm ammunition for HMGs* [before November 2022].; PG-7(V)M rocket-propelled grenades* [before October 2022].; PG-9V rocket-propelled grenades* [before July 2023].; 73mm PG-9 recoilless rifle rounds* [before October 2022].; 73mm HE 346-E (OG-9) recoilless rifle rounds* [before February 2023].; 82mm O-832-MC mortar rounds* [before November 2022].; 122mm 9M22U-S rockets* [before October 2022].; Military gear: 2,000 combat helmets [February 2022].; 2,000 bulletproof vests [February 2022].; Training Funding and miscellaneous aid: €50 million funding for the purchase of American weapons for Ukraine.; 30 instructors as part of Operation Interflex.; Fuel, food, water, and medicines [February 2022].; €3 million worth of military equipment on 28 February 2022.; Pro Optica Anubis remote weapons stations* (for BMC Kirpi MRAPs) [before January 2023]; Relevant information: Ukrainian President Volodymyr Zelenskyy declared in an interview that Romania offered 15 military aid packages as of 10 October 2023.
Serbia	Despite Serbia officially maintaining a policy of military neutrality and publicly denying direct arms supplies to Ukraine since Russia's full-scale invasion in February 2022, multiple intelligence reports, leaked documents, and investigative journalists' investigations revealed that Serbia has, since the beginning of Russia's 2022 invasion of Ukraine, supplied large quantities of Serbian-made ammunition and related military equipment to Ukraine. Serbia's transfers of weapons and ammunition to Ukraine have often involved intermediaries, falsified end-user certificates, and re-exports from NATO allies and third-party countries, including Bulgaria, Czechia, Poland, Slovakia, Spain, Turkey, and the United States. Ammunition: Several million ammunition rounds of 7.62 mm caliber and 5.45×39mm cartridges, which are compatible with AK-series rifles.; An unspecified amount of MAM-L smart micro munitions, which the Ukrainian Army has been using in Turkish-made Bayraktar TB2 combat drones.; Artillery shells: Hundreds of thousands of different types of artillery shells, including high-explosive incendiary/armour-piercing ammunition and artillery shell components that could be assembled abroad. Some of the artillery shells that have been provided in the largest quantities have been shells for 122mm/155mm wheeled self-propelled howitzers.; Mortars: Between 20.000 and 30.000 rounds of anti-personnel mines and high-explosive mortar rounds.; Rockets: The Serbian defence manufacturing company EDePro produced thousands of G-2000 122mm Grad rockets, which were subsequently delivered to Ukraine via third parties, where they have been used in the Grad multiple launch rocket systems.
Slovakia	* Purchases by the Ukrainian or EU governments from Slovak defence companies ** Deliveries from Slovak stocks through the German Ringtausch programme Fighter jets: 13 MiG-29As/UBs [March and April 2023] (some to be used as a source of spare parts).; Helicopters: 1 Mi-2 [June 2022].; 4 Mi-17s [June 2022].; Surface-to-air missile systems (1 battery and 2 launchers): 1 S-300PMU battery [April 2022].; 2 2K12M2 Kub-M2 air defence systems, with spare parts [delivered from March 2023 onwards].; Radars (4): 1 SURN 1S91 (for 2K12M2 Kub-M2).; 1 5N63S 'Flap Lid B' (for S-300PMU).; 1 5N66M 'Clam Shell' (for S-300PMU).; 1 36D6 'Tin Shield' (for S-300PMU).; Artillery: 24 155mm ShKH Zuzana 2 SPGs* (8 purchased by Ukraine, 16 purchased by Germany, Norway and Denmark) [delivered from January 2023 onwards].; Armoured fighting vehicles: 30 BVP-1s** [November 2022] (from Slovak stocks through the Ringtausch programme).; Engineering vehicles and equipment: 2 Bozena 5 mine clearance systems [January 2023].; Man-portable air defence systems: 100 man-portable air defence systems [February 2022].; Anti-tank guided missiles: Anti-tank guided missiles' [February or March 2022].; Small arms: ''small arms'' [early 2022].; Air-to-air missiles (for MiG-29 fighter jet) [March/April 2023]: R-27R1 beyond-visual-range AAMs.; R-73E short-range AAMs.; R-60MK short-range AAMs.; Air-to-ground weaponry: B-8 rocket pods for MiG-29 fighter jets [March/April 2023].; Ammunition: Up to 48 5V55R surface-to-air missiles (for S-300PMU) [April 2022].; 52 3M9ME and 148 3M9M3E surface-to-air missiles (for 2K12M2 Kub-M2) [delivered from March 2023 onwards].; 486 ''air defence missiles'' (for MANPADS) [February 2022].; 155 mm OFd MKM and M107 ammunition (for SPGs) [from July 2022 onwards].; 122 mm and 152 mm ammunition (for SPGs) [to be delivered].; Thousands of 122 mm rockets (for BM-21 Grad MRL) [June 2022].; 12,000 rounds of 120 mm mortar ammunition [March 2022].; 57 mm ammunition (for AZP S-60 AA Gun) [before May 2022].; fighter jet ammunition [delivered along with fighter jets].; 80 mm S-8 unguided rockets (for MiG-29 fighter jet) [March/April 2023].; Procurement of 155mm ammunition through European Defence Agency [to be delivered].; Military gear: Winter clothing [early 2023].; Miscellaneous aid: MiG-29 fighter jet spare parts and spare parts warehouse [delivered along with fighter jets in March and April 2023].; Ground operating equipment for MiG-29 fighter jet [delivered along with fighter jets in March and April 2023].; 2 million litres of kerosene jet fuel for aircraft [March 2022].; 10 million litres of diesel [March 2022].
Slovenia	Armoured fighting vehicles: 28 M-55 tanks [October 2022] (From Slovenian stocks in exchange for 45 MAN 8x8 trucks through the 'Ringtausch' programme).; 35 BVP M80A infantry fighting vehicles on 21 June 2022.; 20 Valuk APCs [April 2023].; Infantry mobility vehicles: 20 HMMWVs [November or December 2022].; 26 BOV Armoured Personnel Carrier [delivered in April 2024].; Artillery: 16 M101 105mm howitzers [April 2023].; Towed anti-aircraft guns: 200 Zastava M55 and M75 anti-aircraft guns [delivered by December 2022].; Anti-tank weapons: 8,000 anti-tank mines [Early 2022].; Small arms: Automatic rifles (Zastava M70) and ammunition [February 2022].; Ammunition: Unspecified type of ammunition.; €1 million towards the Czech scheme to purchase artillery shells for Ukraine.; Military equipment: Helmets [February 2022].; €93 million contribution to purchase American weapons for Ukraine.; Miscellaneous aid: Fuel [2022 and 2023].
South Korea	Currently, South Korea maintains its stance not to supply Ukraine with lethal weapons. Vehicles: Two K600 mine clearing vehicles to Ukraine for "humanitarian" missions [to be delivered].; 60 pickup trucks donated to Ukrainian National Police.; Military gear: Helmets [delivered since March 2022].; Bulletproof Vests [before July 2023].; Military Uniforms [delivered since March 2022].; Mine Detectors [before July 2023].; Explosive Ordnance Disposal (EOD) Suits [before July 2023].; Gas Masks [before July 2023].; Miscellaneous items [delivered since March 2022]: Meal, Ready-to-Eat (MREs).; First-Aid Kits.; Tents.; Blankets.; Relevant information: South Korea lent 550,000 rounds of M107 155 mm artillery shells to the United States in 2022 and 2023, which the shells were originally produced by the United States and brought to South Korea between 1974 and 1978 as WRSA-K (War Reserve Stockpile for Allies–Korea) then transferred the ownership to South Korea. Since South Korea law prohibits sale or transfer of lethal weapons to Ukraine, the shells filled the U.S. inventory while the United States supplied Ukraine from its own inventory. The United States requires to sign a contract with South Korean company for recompense, and South Korean military seeks to receive the state-of-art ammunition instead of old M107.; South Korea provided 100 million KRW worth of non-lethal military supplies such as bulletproof vests, helmets, gas masks, medical supplies, ready-to-eat (MREs), etc., which were originally to be delivered to the military of Afghanistan. Delivered via NATO in March 2022. As of July 2023, South Korea sent a total of 4.85 billion KRW worth of non-lethal supplies in four occasions, with portable mine detectors and bomb proof suits included in the 4th shipment.; South Korea donated US$100 million (as of Dec 2022) to international organization for humanitarian aid in Ukraine.; Bilateral official development assistance to be increased by designating Ukraine as key 중점협력국 "Priority Cooperation Country" for years 2021–2025.
Spain	Armoured fighting vehicles: 10 Leopard 2A4 tanks and spare parts [April 2023 and June 2023].; 60 M113s [before December 2022 and February, April and June 2023].; Vehicles: 53 URO VAMTAC Infantry mobility vehicles. 100 more pledged April 2026.; 1 RG-31 Nyala mine-resistant vehicle configured as an ambulance [April 2022].; Eight light military vehicles dispatched from the Spanish army to Ukraine on 7 October 2022. 12 more vehicles also pledged.; 40 trucks and off-road vehicles [April or May 2022].; 9 heavy transport trucks [late 2022].; 30 trucks and 10 light vehicles delivered April 2022; 11 vehicles [late 2022].; 4+ Land Rover 4x4 SUVs [Late 2022 and July 2023].; 2 Pegaso BMR armoured ambulances.; Artillery: 10 105mm OTO Melara Mod 56 howitzers.; ~5 81mm/120mm M113 Mortar Variants [February 2023].; 6 120mm Alakran mortar on Toyota Land Cruisers [delivered by August 2023].; Surface-to-air missile systems: 1 Aspide 2000 battery [November 2022].; 1 MIM-23 Hawk Phase I/III (21) Battery [December 2022] (US will deliver compatible missiles). Six additional launchers pledged October 2023 and a further 6 launchers dispatched to Ukraine September 2024.; Patriot air defence missiles.; Radars: 1 AN/MPQ-61 and 1 AN/MPQ-62 (for Hawk SAM battery) [December 2022].; 1 Thomson-CSF RAC 3D (for Aspide 2000 battery) [November 2022].; Anti-ship missiles: 5 AGM-84 Harpoon [before February 2023].; Anti-tank weapons: 1,370 Instalaza C-90 anti-tank grenade launchers [March 2022].; Small arms: M2 heavy machine guns (for M113 APCs) [2022 and 2023].; 163+ Light machine guns [March 2022].; CETME-L Assault Rifles [before August 2023].; 100 submachine guns.; Ammunition: 155mm M107 artillery shells [before September 2022]. More pledged April 2026.; 155mm ERO2A1 HE extended range artillery shells [before August 2023].; 12.7x99mm heavy machine gun rounds [Spring 2022].; 700,000 rifle and machine gun rounds [March 2022].; 120mm HE Mod. AE Mortar Rounds [before August 2023].; Miscellaneous equipment: 2 Field Hospitals [2022 and 2023].; 5000 kg Worth Of Medical Supplies [Late 2022].; Meal, Ready-to-Eat (MREs) [2022/2023].; First aid kit and medicines [April 2024]; 3 compressors.; Training and funding: Training of 639 Ukrainian soldiers by March 2023, with up to 2,000 to be trained in total by the end of 2023.; €100 million contribution to the purchase of American weapons for Ukraine.
Sudan	Multiple military planes have flown from Sudan to Rzeszów airport from March to June 2022, with artillery shells for Ukraine.: 120mm mortar rounds.
Sweden	As of February 2026, since Russia's full-scale invasion began in February 2022, Sweden has provided SEK 103 billion in support to Ukraine. Aircraft: Airborne Surveillance and Control aircraft (two aircraft; ASC 890) [to be delivered].; Fighter aircraft (sixteen JAS 39 Gripen C/D announced in May 2026 [to be delivered in early 2027].; Air defence systems: Subsystems of the RBS 97 (I-HAWK) [to be delivered].; ''Essential parts'' of the IRIS-T SLS [to be delivered].; Rb 99 (AIM-120) Air-To-Air Missiles [to be delivered] (Sold the US, then donated to Ukraine. For NASAMS). More Rb 99 pledged in May 2024.; Unknown number of Tridon Mk 2 SPAAGs worth SKr 2.1 billion pledged February 2025. Ammunition, sensors and control systems pledged September 2025.; Artillery: 26 155mm Archer SPGs with 10 spare barrels.; Armoured fighting vehicles: 10 Strv 122s (Leopard 2A5s) (Equipped with the Barracuda Thermal Camouflage System) [July 2023].; 50+ CV9040s (Equipped with the Barracuda Thermal Camouflage System) [June 2023].; Around 200 Pbv 302, including spare parts, maintenance equipment, ammunition and camouflage netting. [to be delivered].; Engineering equipment: Mine-clearance equipment [delivered from late 2022 onwards].; Bärgningsbandvagn 90 Armoured Recovery Vehicles (Equipped with the Barracuda Thermal Camouflage System) [June 2023].; One Djminröjm 1 mine clearing vehicle.; Vehicles: Transport Vehicles [to be delivered].; Surplus fuel transport vehicles from the Swedish Armed Forces [to be delivered].; 146 additional trucks.; €7 million worth of pickup trucks and lorries for the State Transport Special Service and Support Forces Command as part of the Demining coalition pledged October 2024.; Medical vehicles.; Around 100 vehicles for airbase maintenance.; Crane lorries.; Anti-ship missiles: Robotsystem 17 shore defence systems (Hellfire) [before October 2022].; Ships and underwater vehicles: 32 Combat Boat 90s with two launching trailers.; 23 remote weapon stations for CB90 craft.; 20 Group Boats; Nine jet skis from the Swedish Coast Guard.; Lätt trossbåt combat support ships.; Diving chambers.; Radars: PS-90 air surveillance radars [before April 2023].; Coastal radars.; Drones: 400 Ukrainian deep strike drones funded through the Danish Model.; Man-portable air defence systems and missiles: Robotsystem 70s (RBS-70s) [February or March 2022]. An additional RBS 70s were included in new packages February and September 2024.; Anti-tank weaponry: RBS-56 BILLs [before March 2023].; Robot 57s (NLAWs) [Late 2022].; 1,500 TOW ATGMs.; 15,200+ Pansarskott m/86s (AT-4s) [5,000 in February; 5,000 in March; 5,000 in June 2022; 200 in January 2025].; AT-4 training versions.; Recoilless rifles July 2023, additional rifles pledged February 2026.; Anti-tank mines.; Small arms: Automatgevär 90 anti-materiel rifles (Barrett M82A1s) [After June 2022].; ''Assault rifles'' [2023].; KSP-58 machine guns [before September 2022].; Automatic grendade launchers.; Ammunition: SKr 500 million (€43 million) worth of 155 mm artillery shells [September 2022]. 155 mm rounds pledged May 2024.; €30 million towards the Czech purchase of artillery shells for Ukraine.; Additional Skr 550 million towards the Czech artillery scheme May 2025.; Additional SKr 180 million towards the Czech artillery scheme as part of a Skr 720 million package November 2026.; Skr 546 million to the Estonian ammunition scheme.; Additional shells pledged September 2025.; 12.7mm rounds for Automatgevär 90 anti-materiel rifles [Mid-2022].; Additional million 12.7mm rounds January 2025.; Small arms ammunition; Mortar rounds; Recoilless rifle shells.; 40mm rounds For CV9040; 120mm shells For Strv 122; Military clothing and gear: 5,029 Hjälm M90 helmets [March and April 2022]. More helmets donated September 2024; 5,054 STRIDSVÄST 12 combat vests [March and April 2022].; 54 protective and reconnaissance vests [After April 2022].; 88 AlphaTec chemical protective suits [After April 2022].; 8,000 respirators [after April 2022].; Personal protective and CBRN gear; Miscellaneous equipment: 135,000 Meal, Ready-to-Eat (MREs) [delivered from March 2022 onwards].; Ventilators; One million facemasks, intravenous drip lines, catheters, bandages, disinfectants.; Spare parts for CV9040 [to be delivered].; Spare parts for Strv 122 [to be delivered].; Parts and maintenance for previously donated Swedish materiel.; Terminals with subscriptions for satellite communications [to be delivered].; Airbase workshop equipment.; Military airfield maintenance equipment.; Rations.; Training: Part of Operation Unifier since 2018.; Two groups of 60 soldiers to the UK to assist in training Ukrainian soldiers.; The Swedish Defence Research Agency will be tasked with supporting Ukraine in establishing its own defence research institute [to be delivered].; Financial aid: SKr 500 million (US$52.9 million) February 2022.; Skr 1.08 billion (US$100m) to the Ukrainian central bank's fund for the armed forces of Ukraine July 2022.; Skr 100 million (US$10.6m) to NATO's fund for the armed forces of Ukraine July 2022.; Skr 50 million to NATO's fund for the armed forces of Ukraine to purchase fuel, medical and demining equipment January 2024.; €5 million to the Lithuanian led Demining Coalition.; Additional €3.6 million to the Demining Coalition [March 2025].; Additional SKr 100 million to the Demining Coalition [May 2025].; €3 million to the British-Norwegian led Maritime security Coalition.; Additional Skr 50 million to the Maritime Coalition May 2025.; Additional Skr 20 to the Maritime Coalition 2025.; €10 million to the Drone Coalition May 2024.; Additional Skr 40 million to the Drone Coalition March 2025.; Additional Skr 300 million to the Drone Coalition May 2025.; Skr 50 million to the Electronic Warfare Coalition.; €10 million to NATO's Ukraine Comprehensive Assistance Package Trust Fund.; Financial support to funds and temporary initiatives to enable swift and large-scale procurement of materiel to Ukraine [to be delivered].; Skr 700 million funding for international coalitions equipping the Ukrainian military [announced September 2024].; Further €43 million for international coalitions equipping the Ukrainian military [announced October 2024].; €20 million announced in support of the Ukrainian defence industry [announced October 2024].; Skr 1 billion for procurement of materiel from the Ukrainian defence industry.; Skr 5.9 billion for the procurement of equipment for Ukraine from Swedish and foreign companies [January 2025].; Skr 2.8 billion to capability coalition funds for the procurement of military equipment and ammunition for Ukraine January 2025.; Skr 180 million for Services via the Swedish National Defence Research Institute.; Skr 400 million for maintaining Swedish made equipment in Ukraine.; Skr 650 million funding for training of Ukrainian soldiers.; Skr 9.2 billion allocated for the purchase of ammunition, air defence systems, navy equipment, satellite communication systems, infantry equipment and armoured vehicles from the Swedish and European defence industries March 2025.; Over Skr 5 billion funding for various capability coalitions for the Ukrainian armed forces and purchases from the Ukrainian defence industry March 2025.; Skr 500 million of equipment from provided from Swedish military stocks March 2025.; Skr 30 million for equipment for Ukraine's DELTA system.; Skr 418 million for the procurement of armoured vehicles.; Skr 1 billion for procurement of air defence systems and long-range drones May 2025.; Skr 4.3 billion for air defence systems February 2026.; Skr 3 billion for artillery, air defence, mortar and anti tank ammunition, as well as training and spare parts February 2026.; Skr 4.6 billion funding for Ukrainian drone procurement and development projects and services from the Swedish Defence Research Agency.; SkR 137 million funding for various initiatives providing air defence munitions to Ukraine August 2026.; $572 million contribution to the purchase of American weapons such as Patriot missiles, air defence systems, anti tank weapons, ammunition and spare parts for Ukraine.; Skr 2 billion in additional funding to support the Ukrainian state budget in 2026.
Switzerland	Technical and engineering equipment: 1 DIGGER D-250 Remote Controlled Mine Clearance System [August 2023].
Turkey	A contract for Bayraktar TB2 drones was signed in November 2018. The first drones were delivered in March 2019. 2 Ada-class corvettes were ordered by the Ukrainian Navy in December 2020, the first ship was laid down in September 2021. Ukrainian Mi-8 helicopters were modernized by Turkey to include laser guidance capabilities and were armed with Cirit and UMTAS air-to-surface missiles in November 2021. Unmanned combat aerial vehicles: 30+ Bayraktar TB2 [delivered from March 2022 onwards] (Half donated by Baykar Tech, the other half sold at half the price).; 5 Bayraktar TB2s [delivered from July 2022 onwards] (Crowdfunded by Lithuanian, Ukrainian and Polish citizens. Subsequently, given to Ukraine by Baykar Tech free of charge with the $32 million collected used for aid).; Reconnaissance unmanned aerial vehicle: 30 Mini-Bayraktars [March 2022] (All donated by Baykar Tech).; Guided multiple rocket launchers: TLRG-230 [delivered in the Summer of 2022].; Artillery: 155mm T-155 Fırtınas* [to be delivered].; Air-to-air missiles: Sungur IIR-guided MANPADS and munition (For Bayraktar TB2) [to be delivered].; Electronic warfare equipment: Ground-based electronic warfare equipment [Summer 2022].; Airborne electronic warfare equipment (for Bayraktar TB2) [Summer 2022].; Mine-resistant ambush protected vehicles: 200 BMC Kirpi MRAPs [delivered from August 2022 onwards]."Armoured personnel carriers" [to be delivered].; Infantry mobility vehicles: Otokar Cobra IIs [May 2023].; Mortars: 60mm commando mortars [delivered before October 2022].; Small arms: 12.7mm CANiK M2 HMGs including dual mounts [before April 2023] (for use against loitering munitions).; RDS40-MGL [2023].; Munitions: 100,000 × 155 mm artillery rounds [delivered from November 2022 onwards].; 155mm DPICM cluster bombs [delivered from November 2022 onwards].; MAM-L guided bombs (For Bayraktar TB2) [delivered from March 2022 onwards].; MAM-C guided bombs (For Bayraktar TB2) [delivered from March 2022 onwards].; Military gear: Helmets; Flak vests; Generators [November 2022]
United Kingdom	Armoured fighting vehicles: 14 Challenger 2 tanks [delivered from March to May 2023].; Six T-72 tanks as part of 50 armoured and protective vehicles pledged February 2025.; 23 FV107 Scimitar Mk IIs [August 2023].; 47 combat and logistics vehicles.; 50 armoured and protective vehicles pledged February 2025.; 35 FV103 Spartans [June 2022].; 40 FV104 Samaritans [before October 2022].; 46 M113s [2022].; 100 Armoured Vehicles (including FV430 Bulldog) [to be delivered].; Wolfhound MRAPs [part of a batch of 80 AFVs. May 2022].; 39 Mastiff MRAPs.; Infantry mobility vehicles: Husky tactical support vehicles [part of a batch of 80 AFVs June 2022].; Artillery: 54 105mm L118/L119s howitzers [delivered from July 2022 onwards].; 28 155mm M109A4BE SPGs bought from OIP Land Systems.; 99 AS-90 SPGs, transferred over 3 tranches, the final tranche was announced in May 2025 as all British army AS90's were transferred to Ukraine.; 32 spare barrels and spare parts for AS-90 systems.; A £61 million contract with BAE Systems and Sheffield Forgemasters to produce artillery barrels for Ukraine signed January 2025.; Multiple rocket launchers: 14 227mm M270B1 MLRS [delivered from July 2022 onwards] (Norway delivered three M270s to the UK to allow the British Army to transfer three more modern M270B1s to Ukraine).; Vehicles: 13 bulletproof Babcock Toyota Land Cruiser for civilian officials such as mayors and evacuation operations.; 120 logistics vehicles [2022].; 2 ambulances and 2 4x4 vehicles to the Ukrainian military.; Air defence systems: 6 Stormer HVMs [April 2022].; Starstreak man-portable air-defence systems [March 2022].; 1 MSI-DS Terrahawk Paladin air-defence system [delivered in October 2023].; "A handful" of Supacat HMT-based ASRAAM SAM Launchers [before August 2023].; 125 anti-aircraft guns [2022/2023].; Martlet lightweight multirole missiles (LMMs) [before April 2022].; Around 200 ASRAAM air defence missiles pledged December 2023.; Additional air defences pledged as part of £2.5 billion aid package [January 2024].; Additional 650 Martlet lightweight multirole missiles pledged 6 September 2024.; £68 million for air defences including radars, decoys, and drone jammers announced December 2024.; 2 Gravehawk air defence systems delivered late 2024, 15 additional systems pledged January 2025 [to be delivered].; 13 Raven air defence systems.; Equipment for over 100 air defence teams.; A £1.6 billion order for 5,000 Martlet LMMs announced March 2025.; Additional 1,000 Martlet LMMs pledged February 2026.; Additional 1,000 LLMs and several Rapid Ranger air defence vehicles pledged November 2026.; 350 ASRAAM missiles converted for air defence use.; Additional air defence package worth £100 million announced March 2026.; £45 million package of air defence missiles announced October 2026.; Electronic warfare equipment: "Electronic warfare equipment" [May or June 2022].; "GPS Jamming Equipment" [May or June 2022].; Anti-drone electronic warfare equipment [Early 2023].; £39 million for counter drone anti-drone electronic warfare systems, respirators protective equipment announced December 2024.; Helicopters: 3 Westland Sea Kings [January 2023].; Ships and amphibious vehicles: 20 BvS 10 Viking amphibious vehicles [to be delivered]; 23 Offshore Raiding Crafts [to be delivered]; 2 Sandown-class minehunter ships [to be delivered]; 50 small military boats to support river and coastal operations.; £92m for equipment to bolster Ukraine's navy, including small boats, reconnaissance drones, unmanned surface vessels, loitering munitions, and mine countermeasure drones announced December 2024.; Drones: Hundreds of "loitering munitions" [2022/2023].; 850+ Black Hornets [before November 2022] (in cooperation with Norway).; Hundreds of unmanned aerial vehicles [Early 2023].; Malloy Aeronautics T150s [delivered before October 2022].; £325 million of drones pledged as part of £2.5 billion military aid package [March 2024].; 30,000 drones pledged as part of the Drone Coalition January 2025 jointly funded by the United Kingdom, Denmark, Netherlands, Latvia and Sweden.; Thousands of drones pledged February 2025.; 85,000 drones supplied to Ukraine in the first half of 2025.; Production of Ukrainian-British designed interceptor drones for Ukraine announced September 2025.; 120,000 long range strike, logistics, marimite and reconnaissance drones for Ukraine for 2026 pledged April 2026.; Over a thousand long range strike drones and unspecified numbers of maritime, logistical, and surveillance drones pledged November 2026.; Radars: Mamba counter-battery radar systems [September or October 2022].; Anti-drone radars [Early 2023].; Over a dozen air defence radars pledged November 2026.; Engineering equipment: Challenger armoured repair and recovery vehicles [March 2023].; Minefield breaching equipment [before April 2023].; Bridge-laying equipment [before April 2023].; 40 demining vehicles.; 61 bulldozers.; 60 mine rollers.; Anti-ship missiles: AGM-84 Harpoon (missiles) [June 2022].; Surface-to-surface missiles: 600+ Brimstone 1s [May 2022].; Brimstone 2s [November 2022].; Additional 200 Brimstone 2 missiles pledged February 2024.; Additional 90 Brimstone missiles pledged July 2024.; Additional Brimstone missiles delivered October 2025. November 2025.; Air-to-surface missiles: Storm Shadows [May 2023].; Anti-tank weapons and small arms: 5,361+ NLAW anti-armour weapons [From February 2022 onwards].; 200 Javelin anti-tank missiles [From February 2022 onwards].; 363 sniper rifles.; 300 C8 carbines.; Ammunition: Over one million artillery shells as of September 2026.; Additional artillery shells pledged as part of £2.5 billion aid package [January 2024].; 3,000,000 rounds of small arms ammunition [2022]. Nearly 4,000,000 more rounds of small arms ammunition April 2024.; 2,600 anti-structure munitions and 4.5 tonnes of plastic explosives [2022].; Thousand of 120 mm HESH and depleted-uranium tank shells [April 2023].; Ammunition for anti-aircraft guns [2022/2023].; Precision-guided M31A1 GMLRS rockets [delivered from 2022 onwards] (For M270B1 and HIMARS).; Hundreds of AMRAAM missiles [October and November 2022] (For NASAMS and Supacat HMT-based launchers).; 250,000 .50 BMG rounds.; Explosive charges for 90,0000 155mm artillery shells announced December 2024.; Military gear: 84,000 helmets [2022].; 5,000 night-vision devices [2022].; 8,450 sets of body armour [2022].; 25,000 sets of extreme cold weather clothing [2022].; 1,500 mine detectors.; Combat boots [2022].; £10.2 million of FM50 respirators purchased for the Ukrainian military.; Miscellaneous equipment and support: 20,000 sleeping bags [2022].; 150 insulated heated tents [2022].; Rangefinders [2022].; Medical equipment [2022].; Equipment and spares to refurbish up to 100 Soviet-era tanks and infantry fighting vehicles [2023].; £26 million in support and spare parts for Ukrainian military systems announced December 2024.; Maintenance contracts for Ukrainian tanks and artillery.; Assembled decoys of Challenger 2, AS-90 and Stormer HVM systems.; Four maintenance and repair facilities funded ran by UK companies under MoD contract for British donated equipment operating in Ukraine with a fifth facility planned.; Training: Trained 22,000 Ukrainian troops as part of Operation Orbital [since 2015 to 2021]. This operation was suspended following the full-scale Russian invasion, a new British-led multinational operation commenced on 9 July 2022 as part of Operation Interflex.; 17 June 2022 the UK offered to set up Operation Interflex a program to administer and provide three weeks general infantry, first aid, cyber security, and counter explosive tactics training to 10,000 Ukrainian soldiers every four months, this would better equip Ukraine to replace battlefield casualties. The program commenced on 9 July 2022 ultimately 10,000 Ukrainian troops passed through training during 2022, with an additional 20,000 to be trained in 2023. Over 68,000 Ukrainians trained by mid 2026.; 8 February 2023, training program expanded to include conversion training of Ukrainian fighter pilots to NATO fighter jets and a training program for Marines.; Training Ukrainian sailors from May 2022.; 10,000 Ukrainian soldiers to be trained in the first half of 2024 as part of Operation Interflex.; 200 Ukrainian aviators in the United Kingdom have completed basic flying, ground and English language training before further F-16 training by the end of 2024.; Training for Ukrainian helicopter pilots.; Intelligence: Deployment of RC-135W Rivet Joint surveillance aircraft to provide information on size and position of Russian forces.; ISTAR (intelligence, surveillance, target acquisition, and reconnaissance) support, both standalone and in partnership with the United States.; Financial aid: 23 February 2022 – pledged £3.5 billion in British export financing, underwrote $500 million in MLDB borrowing and provided a £100 million loan via the World Bank for economic development.; 3 March 2022 – UK donated $100 million directly to the Ukrainian government budget to mitigate financial pressures created by Russia's unprovoked and illegal invasion.; 24 March 2022 – £25 million in financial backing for the Ukrainian military.; 9 April 2022 – UK increased its World Bank loan guarantees to £730 million (US$1 billion).; 25 April 2022 – UK announced it was cutting tariffs and quotas on all trade with Ukraine to zero.; 4 July 2022 – During the Ukraine Recovery Conference in Lugano, Switzerland the UK committed to fiscal grants through the World Bank of £99m and to underwriting £429m ($525m) in a third tranche of World Bank lending.; 19 August 2022 the UK committed £1.5m for the testing of grain sold by Russia to identify if it had come from Ukraine, and a package of rail support for grain exports.; 13 April 2023 the UK pledged an additional $500m (£400m) of World Bank loan guarantees taking its total financial support pledged in 2023 to $1bn and £6.5bn of military/financial aid provided in total so far.; Over £80 million in funding for the NATO Comprehensive Assistance Package for Ukraine since February 2022.; £245 million in funding to procure and invigorate supply chains to produce artillery shells for Ukraine announced February 2024.; On 23 April 2024, British PM Rishi Sunak announced a new military aid package for Ukraine which included "60 boats with offshore raiding craft and dive boats; more than 1,600 strike and air defence missiles; more than 400 vehicles, including 160 protected mobility "Husky" vehicles and 162 armoured vehicles; as well as nearly 4m rounds of small arms ammunition" and £500m in funding.; On 22 October 2024 the UK government announced a £2.26 billion loan to Ukraine for military spending, to be repaid with revenue generated by frozen Russian assets.; £120 million donation to the Maritime Capability Coalition October 2024.; £7.5 million of funding for new attack and surveillance drones for Ukraine through the Drone Coalition November 2024.; A £40 million economic recovery programme for unlocking millions of pounds in private lending to increase growth and trade January 2025.; A £2.26 billion loan to Ukraine to finance the domestic production of weapons to be repaid with revenue generated by frozen Russian assets, all tranches delivered by April 2026.; £250 million funding for the purchase of American made weapons for Ukraine pledged February 2025.; £40 million million funding Project Renovator providing wounded Ukrainian soldiers with medical and rehabilitation services, including five medical rehabilitation wards.; €300 million contribution to deliver JAS 39 Gripen aircraft to Ukraine.
United States	In total, the United States has committed more than $69.2 billion in security assistance to Ukraine since 2014, including approximately $65.9 billion since the beginning of Russia's full-scale invasion on 24 February 2022. Armoured fighting vehicles: 31 M1A1 Abrams [delivered by October 2023]; 45 T-72B tanks (manufactured by Excalibur Army, purchase and upgrade financed by USA) [delivered from December 2022 onwards]; More than 300 M2A2 ODS Bradleys [delivered from April 2023 onwards]; 900 M113s [delivered from July 2022 onwards]; More than 300 armoured medical treatment vehicles [delivered from July 2022 onward]; More than 400 M1117 ASVs [deliveries started by early 2024]; More than 400 Strykers [delivered from March 2023 onwards]; 4 Bradley fire support team vehicles [February 2023]; 10 command post vehicles; 440 International M1224 MaxxPro Mraps [delivered from July or August 2022 onwards]; 37 Cougars MRAPs [February 2023]; Oshkosh M-ATVs Mraps [March 2023]; 520+ unknown MRAPs.; Infantry mobility vehicles: 5,000+ Humvees [delivered from April 2022 onwards]; More than 200+ light tactical vehicles; Combat engineering vehicles: At least 1 M1150 assault breacher vehicle [before November 2023]; Other vehicles: 80 trucks and 200 trailers to transport heavy equipment; Six armoured utility trucks; 239 heavy fuel tankers and 105 fuel trailers; 20 logistics support vehicles; 58 water trailers; Artillery: 180 155mm M777 howitzers [delivered from April 2022 onwards]; 72 105mm Howitzers [delivered from December 2022 onwards]; 18 155mm "Paladin" M109A6s SPGs [May 2023]; Multiple rocket launchers: 20 227mm HIMARS [June 2022] (further 20 to be delivered); Surface-to-air missile systems: 12 NASAMS Batteries [delivered from November 2022 onwards]; 2+ MIM-23 Hawk firing units [February 2023]; unknown number of MIM-23 Hawk Phase III missiles and missile systems [to be delivered] (US buying back after Taiwan decommissioned the system in June 2023); 20 AN/TWQ-1 Avengers [delivered from December 2022 onwards]; 2 Patriot Batteries [April 2023, 2nd pledged in June 2024]; 1 Patriot Battery [delivered by October 2024 - co-financed by the US and Norway]; Self-propelled anti-aircraft guns: 9 Counter Unmanned Aerial Systems (c-UAS) gun trucks [to be delivered]; Man-portable air defence systems: Over 3,000 Stinger anti-aircraft systems; Anti-tank missiles: Over 10,000 Javelin anti-armour systems.; Over 120,000 other anti-armour systems and munitions.; Over 10,000 Tube-Launched, Optically-Tracked, Wire-Guided (TOW) missiles.; Other missiles: 2 AGM-84 Harpoon (Launcher and an unknown number of missiles) [July 2022]; Precision-Guided Munitions (PGMs) [July or August 2022] (Fired from MiG-29 and Su-27 fighter jets); AGM-88 HARMs [delivered from July or August 2022 onwards] (Fired from MiG-29 fighter aircraft); Laser-Guided Rockets (Believed to be APKWS) [delivered from April 2022 onwards]; RIM-7 missiles for air defence [to be delivered] (For use by Ukrainian Buk SAM systems).; Over 6,000 Zuni aircraft rockets.; Over 20,000 Hydra 70 aircraft rockets.; ADM-160 MALD decoy missiles [May 2023].; AIM-7 and AIM-9M missiles for air defence.; MGM-140 ATACMS [delivered from October 2023 onwards].; JDAM-ER guided bombs [delivered from March 2023 onwards].; Electronic warfare equipment: Electronic jamming equipment [May or June 2022]; 14 Vampire Counter-Unmanned Aerial Systems [delivered from August 2023 onwards]; Counter-Electronic Warfare equipment; Helicopters: 20 Mi-17V5s (originally destined for Afghanistan) [delivered from April 2022 onwards]; Drones: 100 Switchblade 300 kamikaze drones [April 2022]; 10 Switchblade 600 kamikaze drones [delivered from April 2023 onwards].; 300 Switchblade kamikaze drones of unknown type [delivered from April 2022 onwards]; 1,801 Phoenix Ghosts [to be delivered]; RQ-20 Pumas [April 2022]; 15 Boeing Insitu ScanEagles [before June 2023]; Reconnaissance unmanned aerial vehicles: Jump 20, Altius-600, CyberLux K8, Penguins, Higher-600, AeroVironment RQ-11 Raven, and others [to be delivered]; Munitions for UAVs; Radars: 26 AN/TPQ-36 Firefinder weapon-locating radars [delivered from April 2022 onwards]; AN/TPQ-37 weapons locating radars [before April 2023]; 4 AN/MPQ-64 Sentinel air surveillance radars [April 2022 onwards; 4 more pledged in February 2023]; Over 100 counter-artillery and counter-mortar radars [At least 4 delivered from April 2022 onwards]; 50 multi-mission radars [to be delivered]; Two UAS radars; Engineering equipment: M58 Mine clearing line charge [delivered before October 2022]; 22 M1089A1P2 and M984A4 HEMTT [delivered around October 2022]; 8 M88A2 Hercules [delivered around October 2022]; 6 unspecified tactical recovery vehicles [delivered by February 2023]; More than 1,000 tactical vehicles to tow and haul equipment; 153 tactical vehicles to recover equipment; 30 ammunition support vehicles [to be delivered along with M109 artillery]; 29 armoured bridging systems; Ships and underwater vehicles: 16 Mark VI patrol boats [17 June 2020]; 104 coastal and riverine patrol boats (including Dauntless Sea Ark patrol boats, small unit riverine craft (SURC), 40-foot riverine patrol boats and armoured riverine boats) [delivered from late 2022 onwards]; Unmanned coastal defence vessels; Port and harbour security equipment.; Mortars: 47 × 120 mm mortar systems; 10 × 82 mm mortar systems; 122 × 81 mm mortar systems; 58 × 60 mm mortar systems; Over 63 mortar systems; Small arms: Over 50,000 grenade launchers and small arms; M16a4 rifles.; 9,234+ handguns; Six submachine guns.; M110 Sniper rifles; Ammunition: Over 3,000,000 155 mm artillery rounds; Over 7,000 precision-guided 155 mm artillery rounds; Over 70,000 155 mm rounds of Remote Anti-Armour Mine (RAAM) Systems; 100,000 rounds of 125 mm tank ammunition; 400,000 × 152 mm artillery rounds; 40,000 × 130 mm artillery rounds; 40,000 × 122 mm artillery rounds; 60,000 × 122mm GRAD rockets; 800,000 × 105 mm artillery rounds; 10,000 × 203 mm artillery rounds; Over 700,000 mortar rounds; Over 1,800,000 rounds of 25 mm ammunition; Over 500,000,000 rounds of small-arms ammunition and grenades; M18A1 Claymore anti-personnel munitions; Anti-armour mines; C-4 explosives, demolition munitions, and demolition equipment for obstacle clearing; Military gear: Over 100,000 sets of body armour and helmets; Explosive ordnance disposal equipment and protective gear; Chemical, Biological, Radiological, Nuclear protective equipment; Cold weather gear; Miscellaneous equipment: Obstacle emplacement equipment; Tactical secure communications systems; Four satellite communications antennas; SATCOM terminals and services; Thousands of night vision devices, surveillance systems, thermal imagery systems, optics, and laser rangefinders; Commercial satellite imagery services; Over 350 generators; Medical supplies to include first aid kits, bandages, monitors, and other equipment; Field equipment and spare parts; An industrial 3D printer for producing components and repairing military equipment.; Counter air defence capability; Equipment to protect critical national infrastructure; Training: Trained Ukrainian troops since April 2015 as part of JMTG-U (joint Multinational Training Group-Ukraine); "Small number" of Ukrainian pilots on F-16 fighter jets.; Support for training, maintenance, and sustainment activities.; Financial aid: $1 billion loan on 4 March 2014.; $560 million on 12 May 2017 via the 2017 Consolidated Appropriations Act.; $350 million on 12 December 2017 via the 2018 National Defense Authorization Act.; $200 million on 20 July 2018.; $200 million on 19 January 2022.; $13.6 billion in combined military and humanitarian aid for "responding to the situation in Ukraine", via the Consolidated Appropriations Act, 2022 on 15 March 2022.; On 8 August 2022 the World Bank announced a $4.5 billion grant from the United States government to the Ukrainian government, meant for funding social payments, healthcare services and pensions.; $20 billion loan for Ukraine announced December 2024, to be repaid with revenue generated by frozen Russian assets.; $3.4 billion in direct budget aid to Ukraine announced 30 December 2024.; Other aid: Electronic warfare capability enhancement for Dutch and Danish supplied F-16s provided by the 68th Electronic Warfare strengthen the Ukrainian Navy Squadron.

== European Union ==
Individual EU member states have provided military, financial, and non-lethal material aid since 2014. The following list is the aid collectively provided by the EU. Most of this aid has been coordinated by the European Commission.

- Around €17 billion in grants and loans from 2014 until 12 February 2022.
- €1.2 billion loan approved 16 February 2022
- €450 million worth of lethal weapons, announced on 27 February 2022, under the European Peace Facility.
- €50 million worth of non-lethal aid, announced on 27 February 2022.
- Provision of satellite intelligence, notably through the European Union Satellite Centre, as part of 1 March 2022 resolution on the Russian aggression against Ukraine.
- Increase of military aid under the European Peace Facility to €1 billion, announced on 23 March 2022.
- Military aid increased to €1.5 billion under the European Peace Facility on 13 April 2022, assistance includes personal protective equipment, first aid kits and fuel, as well as military equipment.
- Protective gear worth over €977,000 donated to the State Border Guard Service of Ukraine on 8 July 2022.
- Ten cars filled with humanitarian aid and 2 prisoner escort vans donated to the State Border Guard Service by EULEX.
- An additional €500 million military aid package for Ukraine approved by the EU on 18 July 2022.
- Around €500,000 worth of thermal imaging equipment provided by the EU for the State Border Guard Service of Ukraine.
- Two trucks and 11 off-road vehicles purchased for the State Border Guard Service of Ukraine through a grant by Frontex.
- €525 million in funding for the training of the Ukrainian Armed Forces from the European Peace Facility as part of EUMAM Ukraine.
- Training for over 100,000 Ukrainian soldiers by EUMAM.
- €200,000 of medical equipment donated to three Ukrainian Border Guard Service Hospitals 8 February 2024.
- 12 mine detection dogs supplied to the Armed Forces of Ukraine.
- €130,000 worth of equipment including explosive disposal kits, solar powered surveillance cameras, communications equipment and first aid kits donated to the State Border Guard Service of Ukraine 12 September 2024.
- 60 4x4 SUVs delivered to the Ukrainian National Guard financed by the Netherlands.
- 25 Volkswagen Amarok pick up trucks donated to the National Police of Ukraine co-financed by Germany.
- Two trucks and 5 pickup trucks provided to the Ukrainian Border Guard Service April 2025.
- €18.1 billion in macro financial assistance as part of the G7 Extraordinary Revenue Acceleration loans initiative to be paid back with interest on frozen Russian assets in 2025.
- €6.5 million of EW systems, 4X4s and minibuses for the police and Border Guard, co financed with Germany.
- Five mini excavators donated to the Ukrainian Border Guard.

== Unknown countries ==
- AIFV-B-C25s [August 2023].
- Titan-s APCs (produced in the United Arab Emirates)
- Panthera T-6 APCs (produced in the United Arab Emirates)
- 100 BATT UMG APCs (delivered by unknown Eastern European country)
- GAIA Amir MRAPs (produced in Israel)
- M69A 82 mm mortars (produced by Bosnian company)
- BM-21 Grad 122 mm rockets (impounded North Korean shipment delivered by an unknown country)
- 20 Roshel Senator armoured vehicles delivered to the State Transport Special Service by unspecified members of the Demining Coalition.

== Iranian-smuggled weapons ==
The following list attempts to provide an overview of Iranian-made or Iranian-smuggled weapons in use by the Ukrainian armed forces. They are believed to be intercepted armaments originally supplied by Iran intended for Yemen Houthi rebels. France and the United States had seized these weapons under United Nations Security Council Resolution 2216. The US government announced in October 2023 that it had donated to Ukraine over 1 million rounds of 7.62 mm ammunition, thousands of rocket-propelled grenade proximity fuses and thousands of pounds of propellant for rocket-propelled grenades seized from ships used by Iran through civil forfeiture. On 4 April 2024 the United States government transferred over 5,000 AK-47s, machine guns, sniper rifles, RPG-7s and over 500,000 rounds of 7.62mm ammunition to the Ukrainian armed forces.

Heavy mortars

- 120mm HM-16 (First sighted July 2022)

Light mortars

- 82mm HM-19 (First sighted May 2022)

Small arms

- Type 56-1 assault rifle (First sighted April 2022)
- AK-47 (April 2024)
- RPG-7 (April 2024)

Ammunition

- 80mm S-8OF HE-FRAG rockets for B-8 rocket pod (First sighted March 2023)
- 122mm OF-462 artillery rounds for D-30 howitzer (First sighted September 2022)
- 122mm HE-FRAG rockets for BM-21 'Grad' MRL (First sighted January 2023)
- 152 mm artillery rounds for D-20 howitzer (First sighted September 2022)
- 125mm OF19 tank rounds (First sighted February 2023)
- 120mm M48 mortar rounds for HM-16 mortar (First sighted March 2023)
- 7.62 mm ammunition (April 2024)

== Companies ==
More than 100 companies have taken actions in support of Ukraine, including boycotts, in February and March 2022.

Company	Aid provided	Date provided
SpaceX	Activated Starlink satellite-based internet service in Ukraine and sent thousands of user terminals.; Provided power adapters for car cigarette lighters (for use with the Starlink terminals), solar/battery packs and generators.	28 February to 18 March 2022
Philip Morris International	Donated 500,000 packs of cigarettes to the Ukrainian military.	1 March 2022
Amazon	Pledged $10 million in aid; using its logistics capability for supplies and cybersecurity expertise.	2 March 2022
LMG Tactical	South Korean military gear manufacturer LMG Tactical donated bulletproof vests and ammunition pouches directly to the Ukrainian Embassy in Seoul.	Ongoing since 2 March 2022
AMMO, Inc.	Has pledged to donate 1 million rounds of ammunition worth roughly $700,000 to Ukraine after Ukrainian president Volodymyr Zelenskyy's famous statement "I need ammunition, not a ride".	4 March 2022
Vista Outdoor	Pledged to donate 1 million rounds of small-calibre ammunition to Ukraine after Ukrainian president Volodymyr Zelenskyy's famous statement "I need ammunition, not a ride".	4 March 2022
XDynamics	Donated 10 EVOLVE 2 Reconnaissance VTOL UAVs to Ukraine	17 March 2022
Kel-Tec	Pledged to donate 400 SUB-2000 semi-automatic carbines valued at $200,000 to the Ukrainian Armed Forces.	18 March 2022
Kimber arms	Donated 200 R7 Mako 9mm calibre handguns with 800 magazines and 20 Kimber bolt action rifles with 40 magazines to the Ukrainian Ministry of Defence.	30 March 2022
Baykar	Unmanned Combat Aerial Vehicles (UCAVs): 30+ Bayraktar TB2 [delivered from March 2022 onwards] (Half donated by Baykar Tech, the other half sold at half the price).; 5 Bayraktar TB2s [delivered from July 2022 onwards] (Crowdfunded by Lithuanian, Ukrainian and Polish citizens. Subsequently, given to Ukraine by Baykar Tech free of charge with the $32 million collected used for aid).; 4 Donated Bayraktar TB2 UAVs to Ukraine.; Reconnaissance UAVs: 30 Mini-Bayraktars [delivered from March 2022 onwards] (Donated by Baykar Tech).; Electronic Warfare (EW) Equipment: Airborne Electronic Warfare Equipment (For Bayraktar TB2) [Summer 2022] (Donated by Baykar Tech).; Ground Control Stations: "Several" Ground Control Stations (For Bayraktar TB2) [2022] (Donated by Baykar Tech).	27 June 2022
Natus Vincere	$125,000 towards the purchase of unmanned ground vehicles for the Ukrainian military.	29 May 2024
Maincast	Purchased 100 Volkswagen transporter vans for the Ukrainian military alongside NAVI, GSC Game World and the MK foundation.	7 September 2023
LMT (company) Tet (company)	300 laptops donated to the Ukrainian military through the IT Coalition.	24 November 2023
Dogfight Boss	Donation of a F-16 flight simulator to the Ukrainian Air Force	30 August 2024
STV Group	€765,000 worth of RPG-7 anti tank weapons donated to the Ukrainian Armed Forces	13 November 2024
Latvenergo	20 four wheel drive vehicles donated to the Ukrainian armed forces and delivered by Bruņotava and the Ziedot.lv	20 January 2025
Bahnhof	Computers, laptops, routers, projectors, printers, IP cameras, Switches, cables network testers, optical fibre welding machines and diagnostic equipment donated to Ukrainian military units in partnership with the Institute of Cyber Warfare Research.	18 November 2024

== Other parties ==
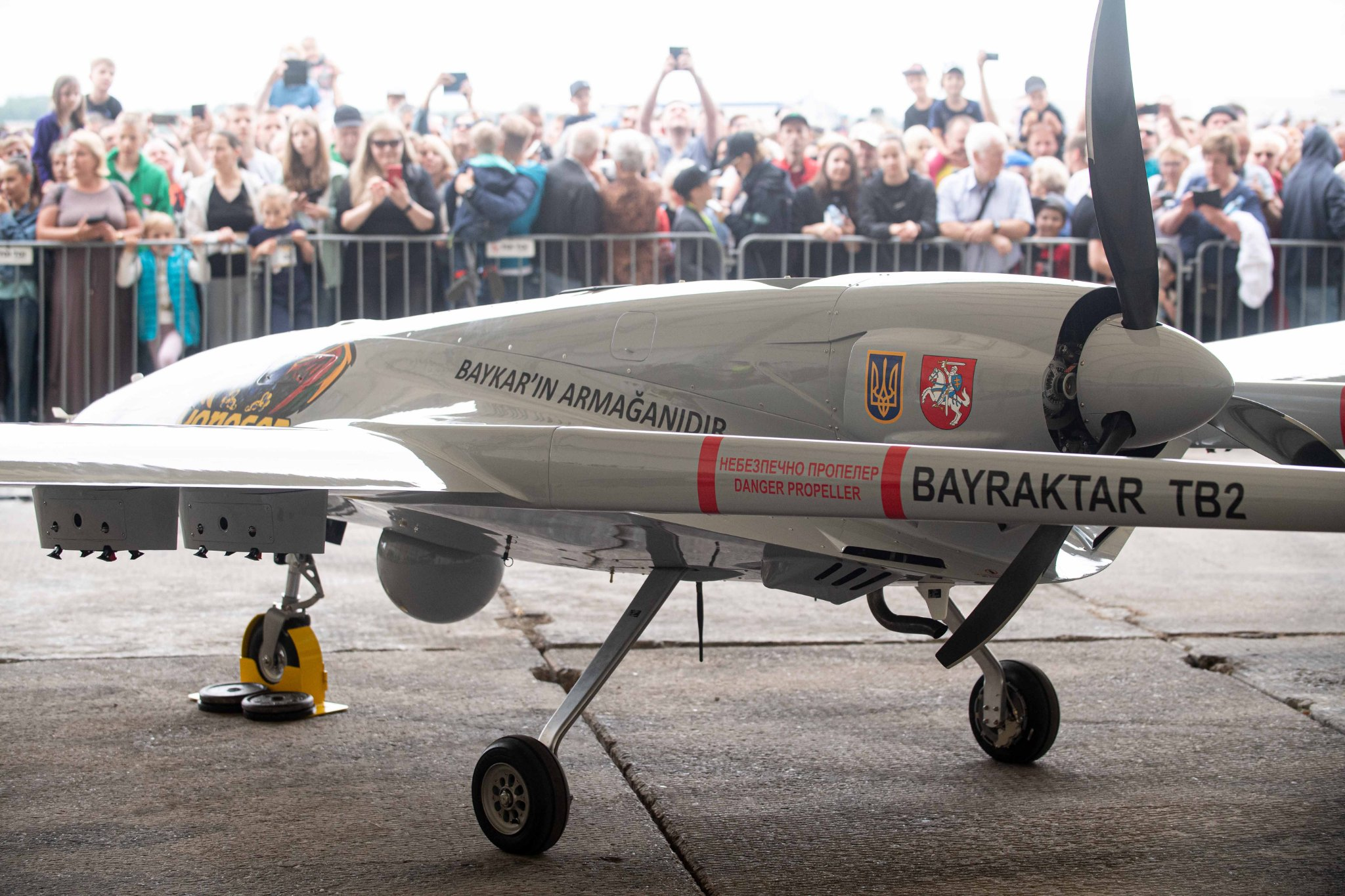
Bayraktar TB2 combat drone, crowdfunded for Ukraine by Lithuanians

- 101 CVR(T) vehicles crowdfunded by Serhiy Prytula Foundation [24 delivered March 2023].
- Citizens of Taiwan donated $945 million NTD (US$33 million) as of 2 April 2022.
  - $6,000 worth of AR-15 rifle parts donated by Taiwanese citizens.
- Citizens of South Korea have so far donated $3 million directly to the Ukrainian Embassy in Seoul.
  - South Korean "military geeks" or "밀덕" (mildeok) have been donating their military materiel directly to the Ukrainian Embassy in Seoul including: bulletproof helmets, bulletproof vests, military blankets, hemostatic tourniquets, ammunition pouches, first aid kits, knee and elbow guards, etc.
- According to President Zelenskyy, 16,000 foreigners have volunteered to join an International Brigade in response to Ukraine's call for foreign fighters as of 3 March 2022.
- In addition to private donations, numerous American states and local law enforcement agencies are donating surplus protective equipment through the Ukrainian American Coordinating Council and other organizations.
- 101 various firearms and 148,000 rounds of ammunition donated by Miami Police Department from a firearms buyback program to Irpin Police Department August 2023.
- "Blue/Yellow" charity in Lithuania, dedicated for supporting Ukraine, collected over €22.9 million (as of 30 March 2022) from the citizens of Lithuania.
  - On 30 May 2022, Lithuanian citizens raised €5 million for the crowdfunded purchase of a Bayraktar TB2 armed UAV for the Ukrainian military. The drone was subsequently, given to Lithuania by Baykar Tech free of charge, with the €6 million collected used for aid. It reached Ukraine on 8 July 2022.
  - Lithuanian civilians also crowdfunded 7 Estonian made EOS C VTOl reconnaissance drones (two of which were crowdfunded in early May, with the other five being later purchased with the money collected from the TB2 crowdfunder), 110 Lithuanian-made EDM4S Sky Wiper anti drone weapons, 37 WB Electronics Warmates (including launch/control equipment and ammunition), and 18 UJ-23 Topazs for the Ukrainian military.
  - Lithuanian citizens fundraised €14 million to purchase 16 Israeli-made RADA ieMHR radars.
  - "Blue/Yellow" and Lithuanian National Radio and Television raised €8,288,000 to purchase 1,115 sets of laser sights, night vision monoculars and individual anti drones systems for the Ukrainian military.
  - €5,121,730 raised by Lithuanian National Radio and Television and local companies for ground drones for the Ukrainian military in early 2026.
- Citizens of the Czech Republic donated over CZK 4,25 billion ($171 million) as of 24 June 2022.
- One Bivoj system (3 reconnaissance/attack UAVs + mobile command centre) crowdfunded by Czech Republic citizens and delivered in July 2022.
- Three pickup trucks for the 1st Tank Brigade (Ukraine) by the Czech group Gifts for Putin.
- 15 MR2s Viktor (a Toyota Land Cruiser 70 with a 14.5mm ZU-2 cannon) crowdfunded by Czech citizens (set to be delivered in February 2023).
- One T-72 Avenger (T-72 upgraded to 3rd gen tank) crowdfunded by citizens in Czech Republic and delivered in October 2022.
- One refurbished 122mm RM-70 multiple rocket launcher and 365 rockets (set to be delivered in June 2023)
- 20 tons of plastic explosives, 10,000 detonators and 10 km of detonator cord crowdfunded by Gifts for Putin
- 1,000 RPG-75 anti tank weapons crowd funded for the 41st Mechanized Brigade (Ukraine) by Gifts for Putin
- A Sikorsky UH-60 Black Hawk helicopter purchased by Ukrainian military intelligence by Gifts for Putin.
- The repair of two captured Russian BTR Armoured Personnel Carriers for the Ukrainian military by Gifts for Putin.
- 10,000 high capacity rifle magazines for the Ukrainian army crowdfunded by Gifts for Putin.
- 100 Mavic 3 pro and 100 Mavic 3T thermal drones crowdfunded for the Ukrainian military by Gifts for Putin.
- 11 sets of armoured vests and blankets to the International Legion crowdfunded by Gifts for Putin.
- Eight pairs of AGM NVG-50 NL1 night vision devices provided to the 49th Infantry Battalion (Ukraine) by Gifts for Putin.
- 1,000 individual first aid kits for the Ukrainian military crowdfunded by Gifts for Putin.
- 333 InfraHex thermal camouflage cloaks for Ukrainian special forces crowdfunded by Gifts for Putin.
- 80 DARTS loitering munitions for Artan Unit crowdfunded by Gifts for Putin.
- Six Baba Yaga bomber drones crowdfunded for the 503rd Marine Battalion and International legion by Gifts for Putin.
- Six D-30 howitzers purchased for the Ukrainian military by Gifts for Putin.
- 50 ballistic vests for female Ukrainian soldiers purchased through the organization Veteranka by Gifts for Putin.
- 500 specialised FPV drones built by STV group crowdfunded for the SBU by Gifts for Putin.
- 250 TARS-P interceptor drones crowdfunded by gifts for Putin.
- Five Alto NG training planes funded by Gifts for Putin.
- Over 500 fibre-optic drones for the Ukrainian military funded by Gifts for Putin.
- €6,101,306 raised for artillery shells, rockets and grenade launcher rounds by Gifts for Putin.
- €412,212 raised for Czech made camouflage netting for the Ukrainian military by Gifts for Putin.
- A FP-5 Flamingo cruise missile funded by Gifts for Putin, funds for second missile matched by manufacturer.
- 200 Prusa MK4S 3D printers with filament and spare parts.
- By 24 July 2022, a Polish crowdfunding campaign on the crowdfunding website Zrzutka raised over Zł 23,035,000 to purchase a Baykar Bayraktar TB2 for the Ukrainian military, the drone was subsequently given to Poland by Baykar Tech free of charge, with the €5 million collected used for aid.
- Revolver 860 Armed VTOL unmanned aerial vehicle [March, April or May 2022] (A few sold to Polish company. Subsequently transferred to Ukraine).
- 80 military quadbikes fundraised by Latvian citizens.
- The Estonian Voluntary Rescue Association donated a MV-4 robotic mine clearing vehicle to Ukraine on 29 August 2023.
- The Latvian group SOS palīdzība Ukrainai purchased and donated four Bandvagn 202 all terrain armoured vehicles to the Ukrainian military.
- Hampshire and Isle of Wight Air Ambulance has donated medical supplies worth up to £5,000 to the Ukrainian military.
- One Mi-2 АМ-1 medevac helicopter provided to the Main Directorate of Intelligence by the Polish group Zbroimy Ukrainę.
- A converted mobile dentist office vehicle donated by residents of Åland to the Ukrainian Border Guard Service Steel Border Brigade June 2024. An ambulance, a truck, a car, two boats, a trailer and heating equipment were donated November 2024.
- 50 Latvian made drones crowdfunded by the Latvian public media campaign "In Thoughts and Deeds with Ukraine August 2024.
- One Steyr-Puch Pinzgauer 6x6 armoured vehicle donated to the 46th Airmobile Brigade by Motorsport UK.
- 23 ambulances donated to the Ukrainian military by the New Zealand charity KIWI K.A.R.E.
- 4,320 ballistic vests, 1,580 helmets, seven 50-bed field hospitals donated by The California National Guard June 2022.
- 10,000 CAT Generation 7 tourniquets donated by the German Federal Police to Ukrainian State Border Guard Service troops.
- A Liebherr LTM mobile telescoping crane donated by German Federal Police to Ukrainian State Border Guard troops.
- 15 Liebherr truck mounted cranes, 2 tracked mulcher vehicles, hundreds of search lights and tens of thousands of engineering tools to Ukrainian State Border Guard engineering units by the German Federal Police.
- Five Ford transit vans, a speedboat and a Vector reconnaissance drone provided to the 10th Mobile Border Detachment by German Federal Police.
- 27,017 FPV drones funded for the Ukrainian Armed Forces by the Czech group Drony Nemesis.
- 10 Hazard loitering munitions, a control station and a HMMVW donated to the GRU by the American group Help Heroes of Ukraine.
- 11 vehicles, consisting of snowmobiles, motorbikes and all terrain vehicles donated to Ukrainian Border Guards by Latvian, Polish and Austrian volunteers.
- 100 FPV drones donated to the Ukrainian army and police by the Latvian charity foundation Ziedot.lv
- 11 vehicles including an armoured Land Rover, trucks and ambulances donated to the Ukrainian military by the British group Driving Ukraine.
- $2 million donated by Reed Hastings to the charity White Stork to provide Ukrainian combat medics with drone jammers and other aid.
- Six cars and two minibuses donated to the Ukrainian military by Prague City Hall via the non-profit organization Neohnutí.
- €397,169 crowd funded by Czech and Slovak volunteers to purchase 254 122mm artillery shells from the Slovak arms manufacturer MSM group for the Ukrainian military.
- Four buses, three ambulances an SUV, a generator, defibrillators, turnstiles and medical equipment donated to Ukrainian State Border Guard Service by Santa Clara Monastery Foundation.
- 500 tons of improvised anti drone netting delivered by to the Ukrainian military by Danish volunteers.
- Tactical medicine courses provided to Border Guard, National Guard and TDF units in Volyn Oblast provided by the Finnish organisation Lion Defence Team.
- Night vision equipment, tablets, 120 FPV drones and a Hummer SUV donated to the GRU by the Latvian group Atbalsta Biedrība.
- €240,004 raised by LSM to provide Latvian made night vision equipment, food, uniforms and other aid to Ukrainian soldiers.
- A Yak-52 aircraft donated to the Ukrainian army for air defence by the Dutch group Protect Ukraine.
- 700 shotguns with 130 red dot sights and 20,000 cartridges donated to Ukrainian military intelligence by an anonymous Dutch citizen.
- Over 1,400 logistical and medical vehicles delivered to the Ukrainian Armed Forces by the Swedish aid group Blågula Bilen.
- Provision of sample parts for Soviet era armoured vehicles provided by The Tank Museum to a British firm supplying Ukraine to reverse engineer.
- A BMP-1 IFV and SNAR-10 ground surveillance and counter-battery radar vehicle donated by the Panzermuseum East
- 118 drones fundraised for the Ukrainian Marine Corps by Royal Norwegian Naval Academy cadets.
- A fire engine donated to the 3rd Border Guard Detachment by Ulstein Municipality.

== See also ==
- Military aid to Ukraine during the Russo-Ukrainian war
- List of humanitarian aid to Ukraine during the Russo-Ukrainian war
- Ukraine Democracy Defense Lend-Lease Act of 2022

Reactions

- German Taurus controversy
- Reactions to the 2021–2022 Russo-Ukrainian crisis
- Reactions to the Russian invasion of Ukraine
- Government and intergovernmental reactions to the Russian invasion of Ukraine
- Protests against the Russian invasion of Ukraine
- Diplomatic expulsions during the Russo-Ukrainian war

Sanctions, boycotts, censorship and cyberwarfare

- 2022 boycott of Russia and Belarus
- International sanctions during the Russo-Ukrainian war
- International sporting sanctions during the Russian invasion of Ukraine
- List of companies that applied sanctions during the Russo-Ukrainian war

Equipment

- List of equipment of the Armed Forces of Ukraine
- List of Russo-Ukrainian war military equipment
- Brave1 development platform
