= 6th Special Purpose Regiment (Ukraine) =

6th Special Purpose Regiment, KRoSSO
- 6-й Полк спеціального призначення Корпусу Рейнджерів ССО
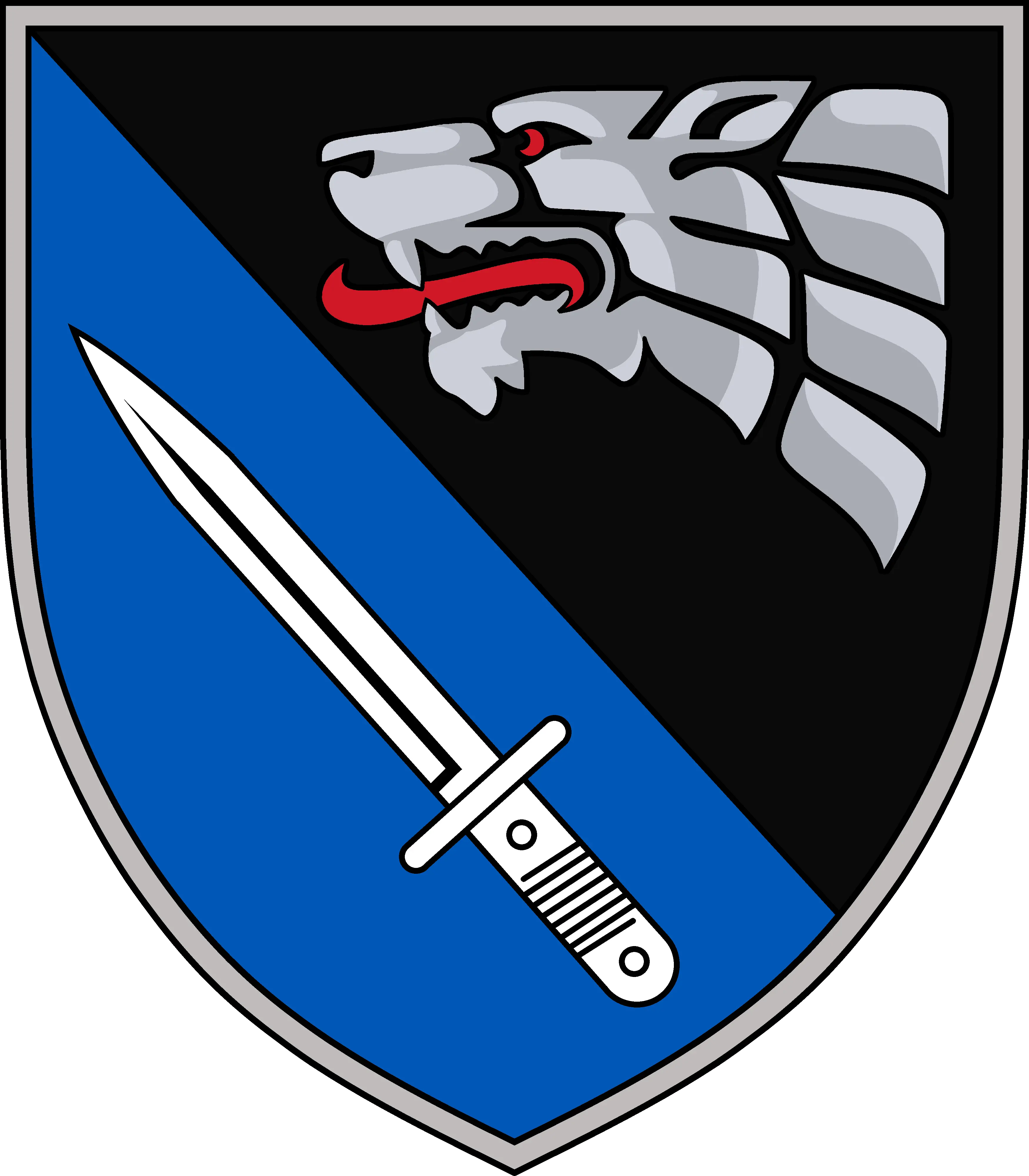
- Active: 2024 – Present
- Country: Ukraine
- Allegiance: Ukrainian Ground Forces
- Branch: Ranger Corps
- Type: Regiment
- Role: Special operations
- Part of: Ukrainian Special Operations Forces
- Garrison/HQ: Khmelnytskyi, Khmelnytskyi Oblast
- Motto: The will determines
- Engagements: Russian invasion of Ukraine: Kursk offensive (2024–2025); 2024 Kharkiv offensive
- Website: https://rgr.army

Commanders
- Current commander: Ruslan Mymrin

Insignia
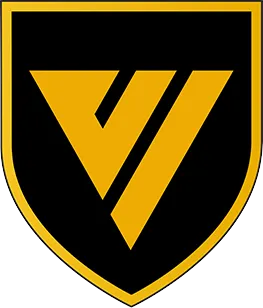
- Former Insignia

The 6th Special Purpose Regiment "Ranger" (Ukrainian: 6-й окремий полк спеціального призначення Корпусу Рейнджерів ССО (КРССО), romanized: 6th okremyi polk spetsial'noho pryznachennya Korpusu Reyndzheriv SSO (KRoSSO), MUN A5018) is a Ukrainian special forces regiment that was formed in 2024 as part of the Ukrainian Ranger Corps.

== History ==
The 6th Special Purpose Regiment was formed in April 2024. Its recruitment continued in May and June. It is garrisoned in Khmelnytskyi, Khmelnytskyi Oblast. On 4 June 2024, the 6th Special Purpose Regiment received its Military Unit Number.

On June 11, 2024, more than 100 new recruits took an oath of allegiance to the state and joined the newly created Ranger special operations forces regiment in Khmelnytskyi, said the commander of the regiment with the call sign "Beaver". The regiment was reported to have a code of honor known as the "Ranger's 12 Rules". The unit promises and guarantees for new recruits:

- Dignified attitude from commanders;
- Completion of service in a professional manner;
- Combat training in accordance with NATO standards;
- Timely financial support at the level of special units;
- Assistance in mobilization or transfer from other units of the Armed Forces;
- Timely rotation, no more than 3 months in the combat zone;
- Support and medical assistance until full rehabilitation;
- Full provision of material property and means of personal protection;
- Financial support at the level of special units from 27 to 150 thousand hryvnias ($3690.96 USD) a month;
- Use of the latest weapons and robotic attack systems.

The Regiment has taken part in the 2024 Kharkiv offensive as well as the Kursk offensive (2024–2025).

On August 4, 2026, the regiment captured two Russian soldiers and killed four others in an operation in occupied territory.

== Equipment ==
The Regiment operates modified BMP-1s with Sich remote weapon station equipped with a stabilizer and thermal imaging sensors, a 30mm cannon, an automatic grenade launcher and a machine gun. It also operates Polaris RZRs and Humvees alongside conventional off-road vehicles and Kozak-5 armored vehicles. It also utilizes FPV drones including DJI Mavic and DJI Matrice.

== Commanders ==
- Undisclosed (Callsign:"Beaver") (2024-)
