= HHN =

HHN may refer to:

- Frankfurt–Hahn Airport, serving Frankfurt am Main, Germany
- Universal's Halloween Horror Nights, a seasonal Halloween event at Universal Studios theme parks
- Harakat Hezbollah al-Nujaba, an Iraqi paramilitary organisation
- Healing Heroes Network, an American veterans' organizations
