= Slinger (weapon system) =

Anti-drone weapon system

Slinger is an anti-drone weapon system developed by Electro Optic Systems (EOS) of Symonston, Australia. It was introduced in May 2023.

The Slinger is designed for low-cost counter-drone interception. Compared to traditional missiles that cost hundreds of thousands of dollars being used against drones costing in the low tens of thousands or less, Slinger has a cost per engagement ranging from $155-$1,550; unit cost is less than $1.55 million.

== History ==
In September 2023, it was announced that 160 Slingers would be provided to Ukraine by EOS for use in that country's defence during the ongoing invasion by Russia. 110 will be mounted on M113 armored personnel carriers and 50 will be integrated onto Practika 4x4 light MRAPs.

In June 2026, Electro Optic System secured a 124 million USD order to supply Slinger counter-drone systems to Abu Dhabi-based Generation 5 Holding L.L.C. (Gen5) for use in the United Arab Emirates. Under the agreement, manufacturing of the systems is split between Australia and the UAE, with deliveries scheduled across 2027 and 2028.

== Design ==
Slinger consists of:

- a remote controlled weapon station (RCWS) based on the EOS model R400 RCWS that uses a lightweight Bushmaster M230LF autocannon which is fully stabilised and capable of on-the-move operation. 150 radio frequency proximity fused, high-explosive/fragmentation 30x113 mm rounds are carried. Rate of fire is selectable at single-shot, 100 rpm, or 200 rpm.
- a secondary MAG 58 coaxial machine gun.
- an Echodyne EchoGuard 4D multi mission surveillance radar is integrated into the system providing detection ranges of more than 3.5 km for vehicles and more than 2.2 km for individuals, while small drones can be detected out to 1-1.4 km and engaged at beyond 800 m.
- the sensor unit, which includes a day camera and thermal imager that can identify objects at distances of 12 km and 13.7 km, respectively.

The turret system weighs 355 kg and has a height of 90 cm, so it can be mounted on the roofs of vehicles or even the flatbed of a pickup truck. It can elevate the guns up to +70° and depress them down to -10°. An operator controls the turret using a joystick from inside the vehicle; it is capable of tracking a target on its own for the controller to engage.

== See also ==
- Skyranger 30
