= Ranger Corps (Ukraine) =

Ukrainian special forces unit

Ranger Corps of SOF
- Корпус Рейнджерів ССО
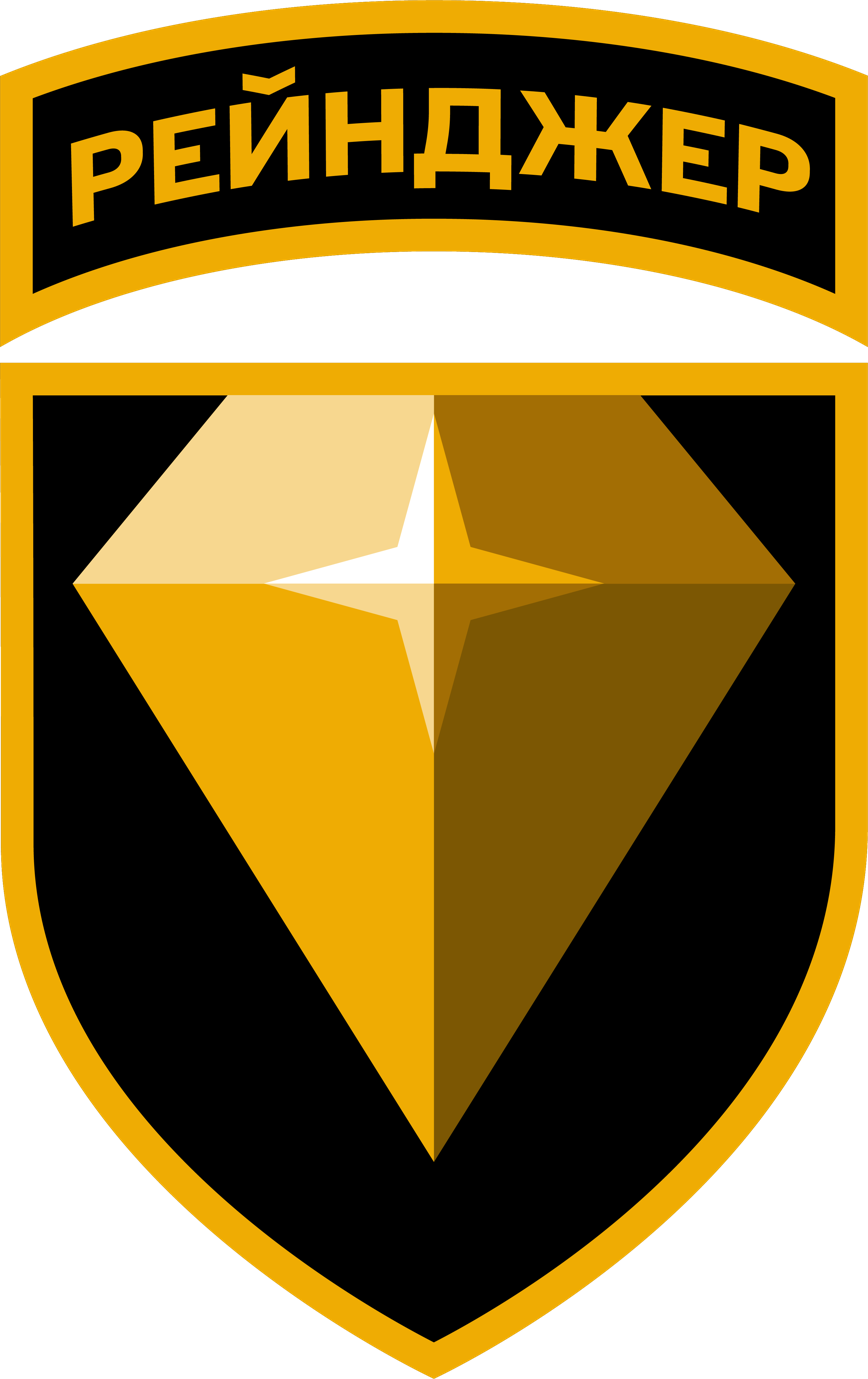
- Active: 2024 – Present
- Country: Ukraine
- Allegiance: Armed Forces of Ukraine
- Branch: Ukrainian Ground Forces
- Type: Corps
- Role: Special operations
- Part of: Special Operations Forces
- Garrison/HQ: Kyiv
- Engagements: Russian invasion of Ukraine
- Website: https://rgr.army

Commanders
- Current commander: Unknown

The Ranger Corps, also known as the Ranger Corps of Special Operations Forces (Ukrainian: Корпус Рейнджерів Сил спеціальних операцій, КРССО, abbr. KRoSSO), is a Ukrainian special forces unit that was reportedly formed in April 2024. The main task of the corps is to carry out special operations in an enemy force's rear lines with the task of conducting reconnaissance, sabotage and disruption.

== History ==
The Ukrainian Ranger Corps was reportedly formed in April 2024. It's been reported that the corps is recruiting volunteers to join from May to June.

Units of the corps are reported to be trained to NATO standards. As of 5 June 2024, only the 6th Special Purpose Regiment has a Military Unit Number.

The Corps has taken part in the 2024 Kharkiv offensive as well as the 2024 Kursk offensive.

On 25 November 2024, the 4th Ranger Regiment ambushed a Russian IFV and killed all six personnel in it.

== Equipment ==
The Corps operates modified BMP-1s with Sich remote weapon station equipped with a stabilizer and thermal imaging sensors, a 30mm cannon, an automatic grenade launcher and a machine gun. It also operates Humvees alongside conventional off-road vehicles and Kozak-5 armored vehicles. It also utilizes FPV drones including DJI Mavic and DJI Matrice.

In 2025, the Rangers acquired Flyer 72-LDs.

== Structure ==
- Ranger Corps Command
  - 4th Special Purpose Regiment
  - 5th Special Purpose Regiment
  - 6th Special Purpose Regiment
  - 7th Special Purpose Regiment
