= Healing Heroes Network =

- Abbreviation: HHN
- Formation: 2008
- Type: 501(c)(3)
- Purpose: "to provide financial assistance to veterans injured in the line of duty in Iraq or Afghanistan on or after 9/11/01"
- Headquarters: Palm Harbor, Florida
- Executive Director: Stacey Spiegel
- Website: https://www.healingheroes.org/

Healing Heroes Network was a nonprofit organization providing financial assistance to veterans injured in the line of duty while in Iraq or Afghanistan on or after September 11, 2001.

== Services Provided ==
=== Welcome Home, Hero Program ===
- In late 2012, Healing Heroes Network received a community grant for the Welcome Home, Hero Program from the Mike Alstott Family Foundation through a Facebook voting contest. Welcome Home, Hero provides short-term financial assistance to wounded military veterans and their families to help meet their basic needs.

=== Tablets For Heroes Program ===
- Provides free tablet computers to wounded Veterans who served in Iraq or Afghanistan, who sustained traumatic brain injuries (TBI) or posttraumatic stress disorder (PTSD). Our tablets come pre-loaded with a variety of apps and programs. These programs help Veterans rebuild hand-eye coordination, improve spatial skills, and foster cognitive development. The tablets can also be used for traditional internet applications, such as email, searching for employment, scheduling doctor's appointments and staying in touch with friends and family members.

=== Healing Heroes Program ===
- Providing financial assistance for medical treatments and therapy services not offered by the VA or other government agencies. They work closely with several medical professionals through the Healing Heroes Network. These professionals provide medical care and therapy treatments to wounded Veterans.

== Tax Filings ==
2012 Form 990 - Shows revenue of $1,661,079 with only $376,157 (22.65%) going toward Program Service expenses and more than $294,387 of that went to advertising, promotions, compensation, and salaries leaving less than 5% for their core services.

2013 Form 990 - Shows revenue of $2,544,356 with only $397,093 (15.61%) going toward Program Service expenses and more than $302,206 of that went to advertising, promotions, compensation, and salaries leaving less than 4% for their core services.

2014 Form 990 - Shows revenue of $2,645,183 with only $742,655 (28.08%) going toward Program Service expenses and more than $573,721 of that went to advertising, promotions, compensation, and salaries leaving less than 7% for their core services.

== History ==
Healing Heroes Network was founded in 2008. Healing Heroes was developed to help service member with suffering posttraumatic stress disorder (PTSD) and traumatic brain injuries.

" In late 2008 he founded Healing Heroes Network as a national charity, headquartered in Palm Harbor, Florida, to fill the gaps left in the VA benefits system.

In 2009, Healing Heroes received its official 501(c)(3) nonprofit status.

== Campaigns ==
=== Get The Bikes ===
In August 2011, Healing Heroes Network began its Harleys for Heroes Sweepstakes. Participants donate for chances to win two Harley-Davidson motorcycles, a 2011 Fat Boy Lo and a 2011 Streetglide, as well as a year's worth of gasoline. The drawing was held on December 1, 2011. The winner was announced December 8, 2011, as Valerie Snider from Indianapolis, Indiana.

In July 2012, Healing Heroes Network kicked off its "2012 Harleys for Heroes Sweepstakes". Again, one winner received two Harley-Davidson motorcycles, a 2012 Street Glide and a 2012 Fat Boy Lo, as well as a year's worth of gasoline. The contest ran from July until February 15, 2013. The winner was announced on the Harleys for Heroes website, as Tom DeVries from Waterloo, Iowa.

In February 2013, Healing Heroes Network rebranded the sweepstakes as "Get The Bikes" and launched the "2013 Get The Bikes Sweepstakes". This time, three winners were selected, each one receiving one Harley-Davidson motorcycle. The contest ran from February until September 12, 2013. The three winners were announced on the Harleys for Heroes Official Facebook page. The first-place winner was Frank A. from Watervliet, New York with a 2013 Street Glide. The second-place winner was June M. from Texarkana, Texas with a 2013 Heritage Softail. The third-place winner was Michael L. from Siloam Springs, Arkansas with a 2013 Softail Slim.

In November 2013, Healing Heroes Network launched its "Outdoors for Heroes Sweepstakes". A single winner, Michael W. of Port St. Lucie, Florida won a Polaris RZR XP 1000. The contest ran from November 6, 2013 through May 6, 2014.

In July 2014, "Get The Bikes" returned in the "2014 Get The Bikes Sweepstakes". The contest ran from July 1, 2014 through December 30, 2014. Joseph M. from Liverpool, Ohio won two Harley-Davidson motorcycles.

In June 2015, the "2015 Get The Bikes Sweepstakes" began. The winner was Diana M. of Kentucky. She won a Harley-Davidson Street Glide Special, a Harley-Davidson Softail Slim and a year's worth of gas. The contest began on June 1, 2015 and ended January 12, 2016.

In June 2016, the "2016 Get The Bikes Sweepstakes" started. The contest is set to end on March 22, 2017. The prize includes a 2016 Harley-Davidson Street Glide Special, a 2016 Harley-Davidson Softail Slim and a year's worth of gas.

== Events ==
=== Healing Heroes Freedom Fest ===
Healing Heroes Freedom Fest is a fundraising event held annually to support Healing Heroes Network. In 2013 and 2014, Healing Heroes Freedom Fest was located at the Sun 'n Fun Grounds at the Lakeland Linder International Airport in Lakeland, Florida.

=== Big Bay Beer Fest ===
The Big Bay Beer Fest is a Tampa, Florida festival dedicated to craft beers. Healing Heroes Network will promote its mission of supporting wounded veterans. Festival attendees may participate in a silent auction, the proceeds of which will benefit Healing Heroes Network.
