= Polaris RZR =

US sport vehicle

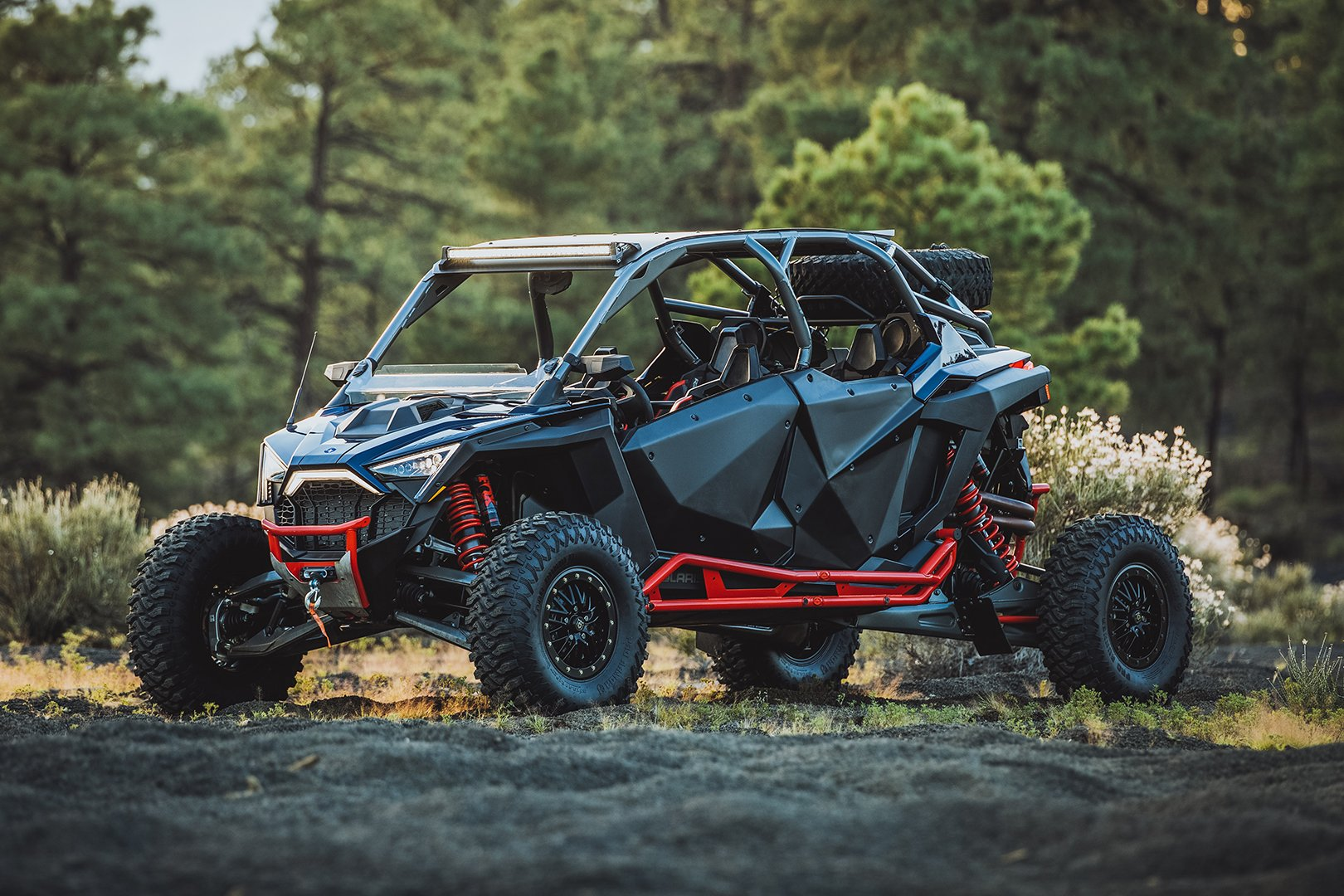
2022 Polaris RZR Pro R Ultimate 4-Seater.

The Polaris RZR (Often pronounced as POLARIS RAZOR), is a sport side-by-side produced by Polaris Industries. When launched in 2007 as a 2008 model, it was officially known as the Ranger RZR, as it was marketed as a sub-model of the larger, work-oriented Ranger. As the RZR gained popularity, Polaris eventually dropped the Ranger designation and positioned the RZR as a stand-alone model.

== RZR models in the US ==
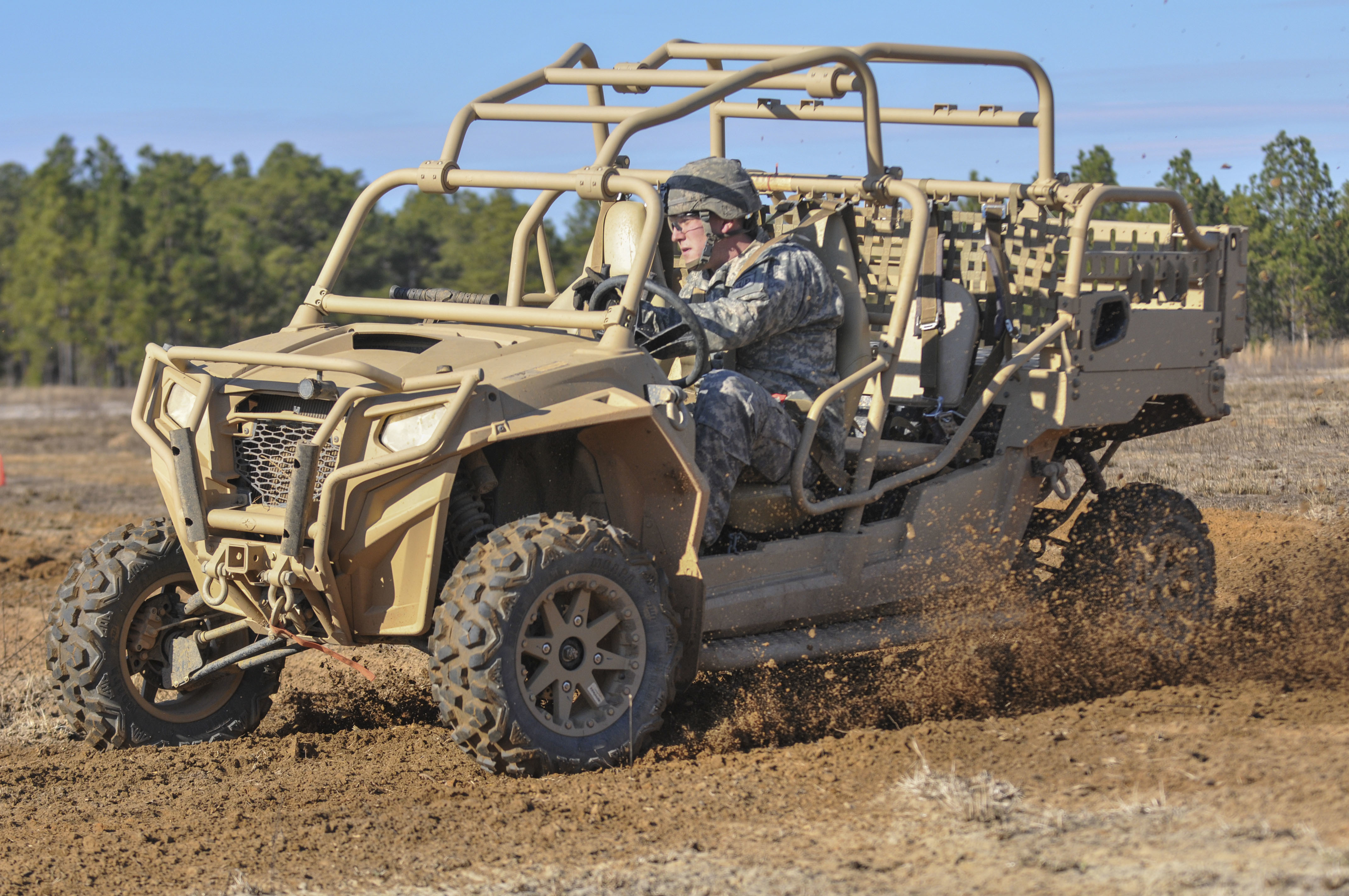
LT-ATV variant of the MRZR-4 during Red Falcons familiarization

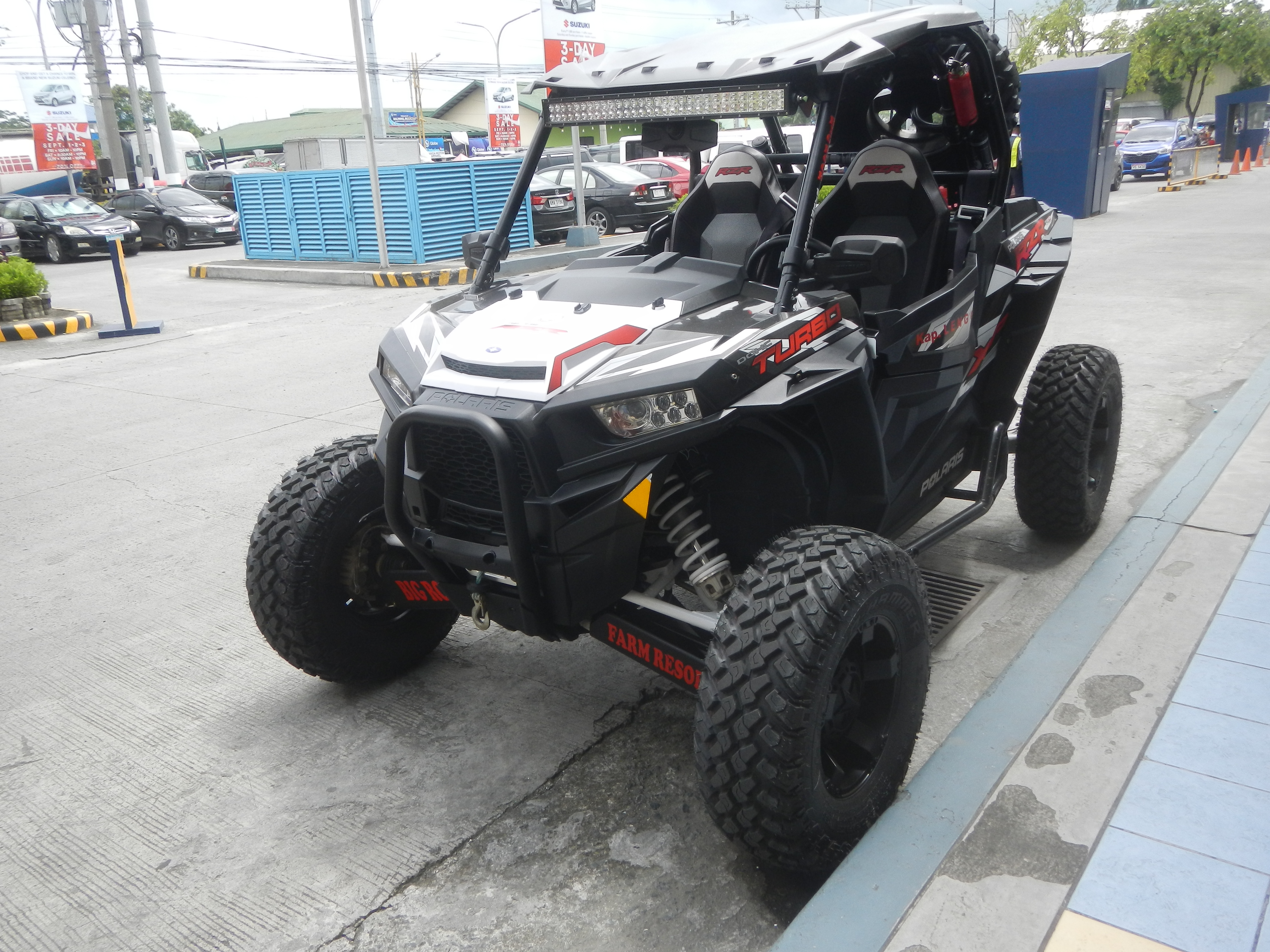
Polaris RZR XP Turbo ProStar

Civilian models:

- RZR 170
- RZR 900
- RZR S 900
- RZR XP 900
- RZR S 1000
- RZR XP 1000
- RZR Turbo s
- RZR Pro R

Military models:

- MRZR-2
- MRZR-4
- MRZR Alpha
- MRZR Alpha XP
- MRZR D2
- MRZR D4

== Military use ==
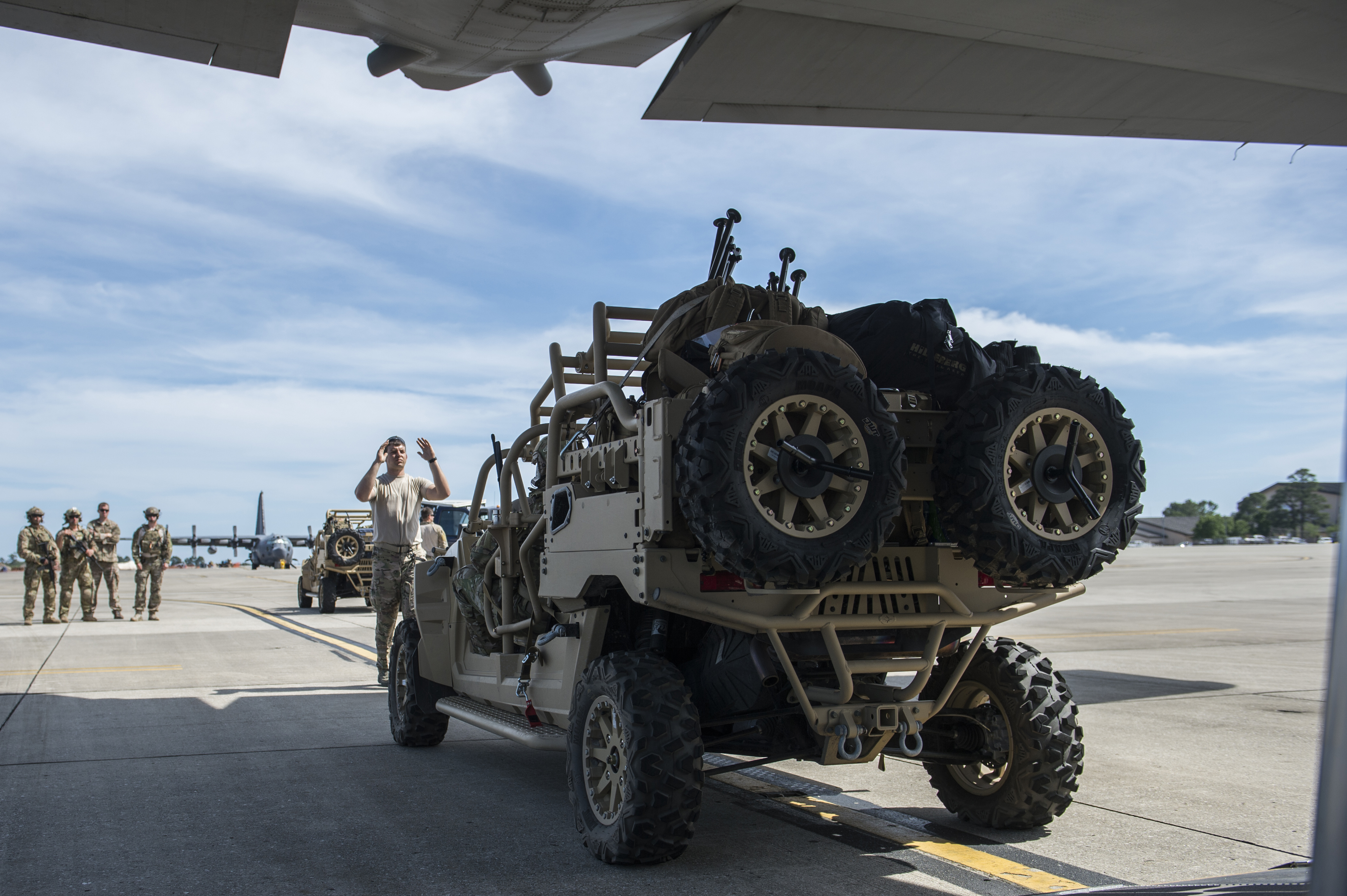
A U.S. Air Force combat controller with the 21st Special Tactics Squadron loads a Polaris MRZR-4 with full rear cargo bed onto a C-130 Hercules.

A convoy of Polaris MRZR all-terrain vehicles driven by FBI Hostage Rescue Team through thick brush.

U.S. Special Operations Command, (USSOCOM), placed an order with Polaris Defense in September 2013 for up to 1,500 MRZR-2 (2-seat) and MRZR-4 (4-seat) machines. A big drawback of these new small military vehicles was that they retained their original gasoline engines, which are incompatible with standard military JP-8 fuel. In terms of logistics, two different fuel types are undesirable. As few such machines see combat use, and civilian users are uninterested in running them on diesel, an engine change was deemed unlikely.

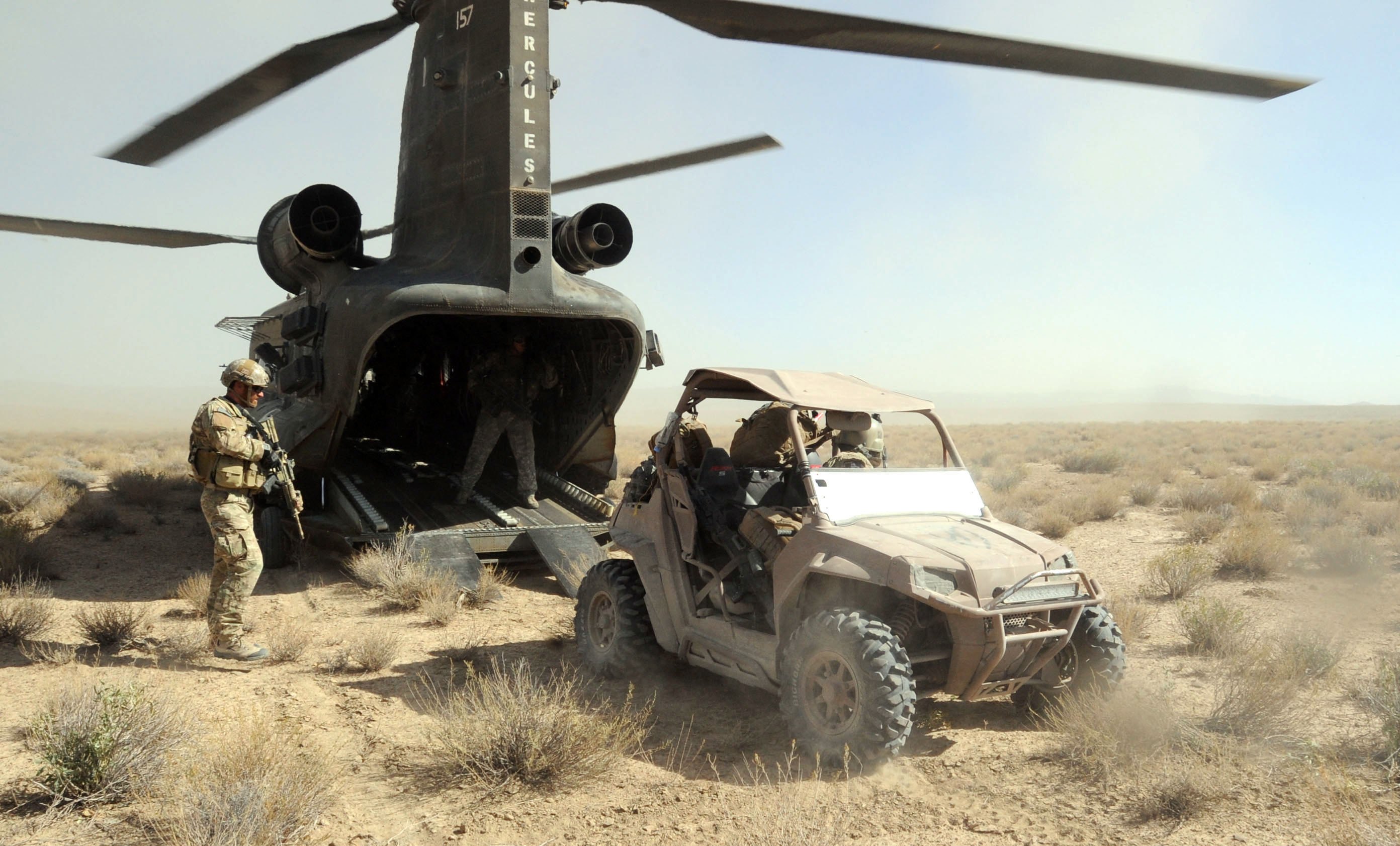
US Army S.O.F. use RZR 800 out of CH-47

In November 2016, the U.S. Marine Corps signed a $2.5 million contract with Polaris to deliver 144 MRZR-D vehicles. Called the Utility Task Vehicle (UTV), it is designed to be diesel-powered and can run on JP-8 fuel. The Marines bought the unarmored vehicles because they can fit inside an MV-22 Osprey, enabling them to be deployed from long distances, to provide logistics support to ground combat units, assisting them to travel and transport supplies quicker and easier than previously on foot. The vehicles can carry four marines and have a small cargo bed capable of carrying 1,500 lb (680 kg) of payload. Plans are to field 18 MRZR-Ds per infantry regiment. The vehicles were delivered from late-January to April 2017.

U.S. Army soldiers with Special Operations Task Force / South also used Polaris RZR 800 Light Tactical All-Terrain Vehicles (LT-ATV), internally transportable by CH-47 Chinook helicopter, and rapidly off-loadable, during operations in 2010 in the Maruf District, Kandahar Province, Afghanistan.

The Royal Navy has procured a batch of Polaris MRZR-D4 UTVs for the Royal Marines and a version of the MRZR has been in service with UK Special Forces for a number of years.

=== Current operators ===
Military operators of the Polaris RZR

Slovenia

Argentina

- Argentine Army

Germany

- German Army

Hungary

- Hungarian Armed Forces

El Salvador

- Salvadoran Army
- Navy of El Salvador

India

- Indian Army

Lebanon

- Lebanese army

New Zealand

- New Zealand Army
- Royal New Zealand Navy

Portugal

- National Republican Guard
- Portuguese Army

Romania

- Romanian Armed Forces

Thailand

- Royal Thai Army

Turkmenistan

- Armed Forces of Turkmenistan

Ukraine

- Ukrainian Ranger Corps

United Kingdom

- Royal Marines
- United Kingdom Special Forces

United States

- Federal Bureau of Investigation
- United States Special Operations Command
- United States Marine Corps

== Fire hazards and recalls ==
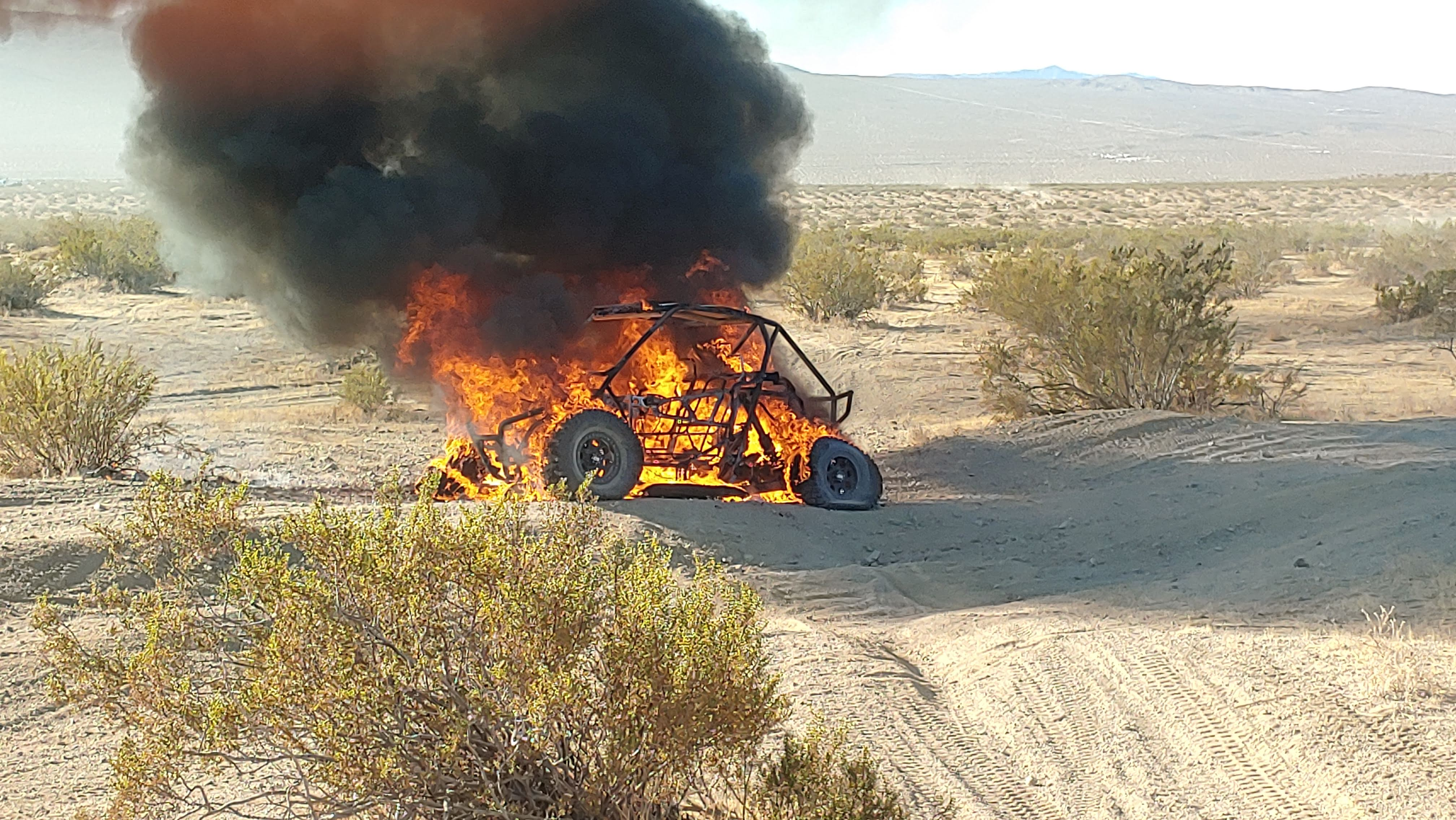
A Polaris RZR on fire in the Mojave desert

For 2010, Polaris developed their own engine for the RZR, known as the ProStar. Unlike the previous engine, which had the exhaust cooled by airflow, the ProStar equipped RZR connected the engine to the exhaust header pipe in the front of the engine, before making a 180 degree turn and exiting at the rear of the vehicle. This design creates a hot spot directly behind passengers that can degrade components and ignite debris, fuel and plastic panels. Customers soon reported plastic panels between the passengers and the engine were melting and smoking and Polaris' safety director at the time believed the vehicle should be recalled. However, no recall was performed, with Polaris issuing a service bulletin which does not require Polaris to issue notice to consumers or the Consumer Product Safety Commission.

In July 2014, an 11-year-old girl from Texas suffered 3rd and 4th degree burns on 60% of her body when the Polaris she was riding in tipped over and ignited. Her right leg and left foot were later amputated. A 15-year-old girl was killed when the RZR she was a passenger in caught fire in July 2015. In September 2016, two Arizona women were killed when their Polaris tipped over and sparked a fire.

In April 2018, Polaris was fined a record $27.5 million by the Consumer Product Safety Commission (CPSC) for two 2016 late-reporting claims relating to a fire risk. The CPSC alleges Polaris had received reports of 150 RZR fires, including the death of the above-mentioned 15 year old passenger, 11 reports of burn injuries and a fire that burned 10 acres of land, but failed to immediately notify them. Over the years, Polaris has recalled more than half a million RZR's for manufacturing defects that could lead to fires, burns or death. However, owners of RZRs are continuing to report fires on vehicles that been previously repaired, including total-loss fires.

In May 2019, a 23-year-old man from Idaho suffered fatal burns when the RZR he was riding in burst into flames, despite the 2017 RZR receiving the repairs under the 2018 recall.

== Specifications ==
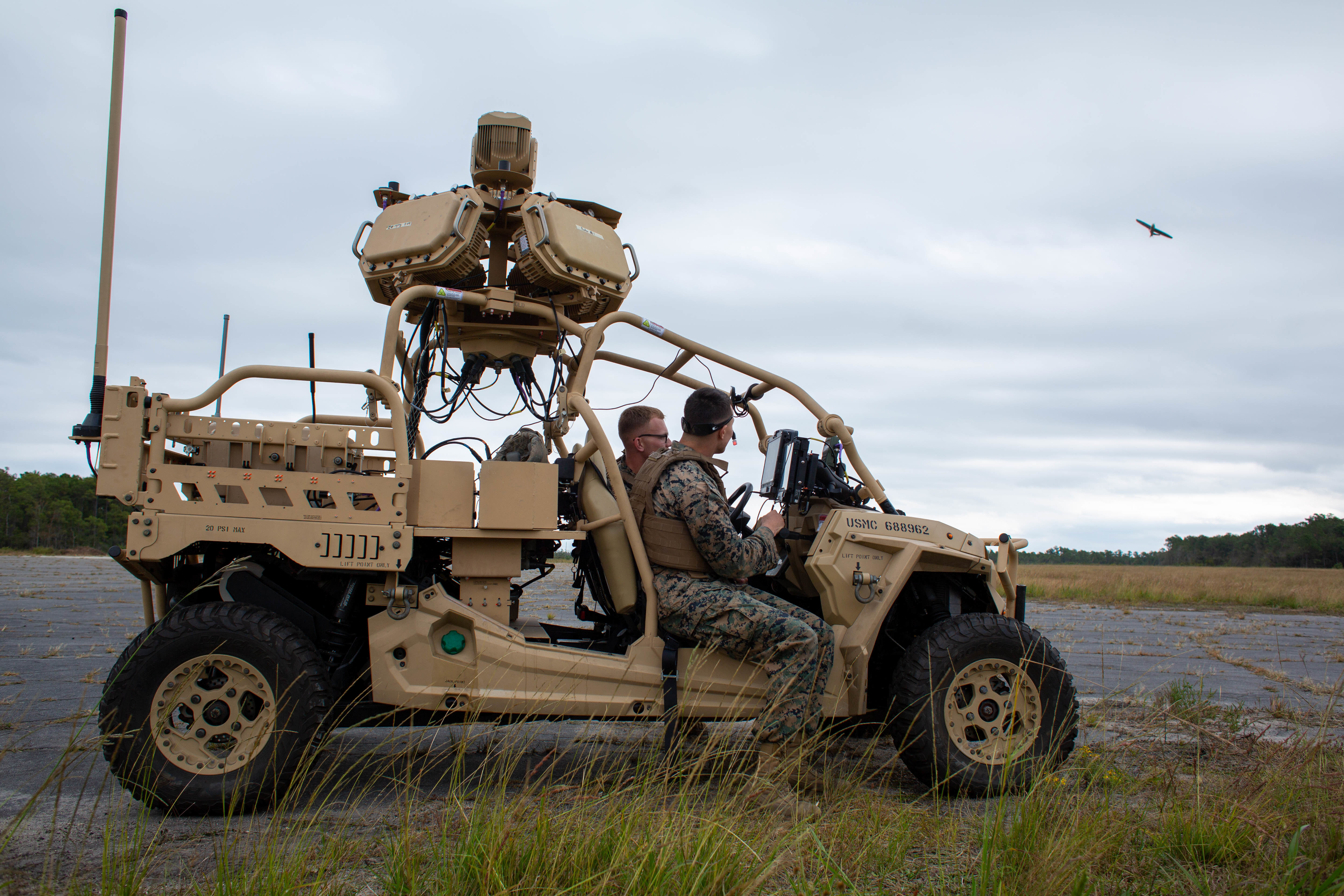
Light-Marine Air Defense Integrated System (L-MADIS)

	RZR 570	RZR 800	RZR S 800	RZR XP 900	RZR XP 1000	RZR S 900	RZR S 1000	RZR XP Turbo	RZR XP Turbo S	RZR PRO XP	RZR Turbo R	RZR Pro R
Model Year Debut	2012	2008	2009	2011	2014	2015	2016	2016	2018	2020	2022	2022
Horsepower	45	52	56	88/96	107	75	100	144	168	181	181	225
Displacement (cc)	567	760	760	875	999	875	999	925	925	925	925	1997
Width	50	50	60	64	64	60	60	64	72	64	74	74
Wheelbase	77	77	77	81.4	90	79	79	90	90	96	96	104.5
Length	107.5	102	106	108	119	105	106	119	122	126	128	136.5
Ground Clearance	10	10	12	13	13.5	11	12.5	13.5	16	14.5	16	16
Front Tire Size	25 x 8-12	25 x 8-12	26 x 9-12	27 x 9-12	29 x 9-14	26 x 8-12	27 x 9-12	29 x 9-14	32 x 10-15	30 x 10-14	32 x 10-15	32 x 10-15
Rear Tire Size	25 x 10-12	25 x 10-12	26 x 12-12	27 x 11-12	29 x 11-14	26 x 9-12	27 x 11-12	29 x 11-14	32 x 10-15	30 x 10-14	32 x 10-15	32 x 10-15
Front Wheel Travel	9	9	12	13.5	16	12.25	12.25	16	19	17	22.25	22.25
Rear Wheel Travel	9.5	9.5	12	14	18	13.2	13.2	18	21	20	22.4	24.5
Dry Weight (lbs.)	970	945	1,000	1,190	1,379	1,148	1,235	1,495	1,751	1,759	1,943	2,085

Numbers above are for the first model year available. Units in inches unless otherwise noted. Numbers are manufacturer's where available.
