= Practika =

Ukrainian armoured vehicle manufacturer

Research and Production Association "Practika"
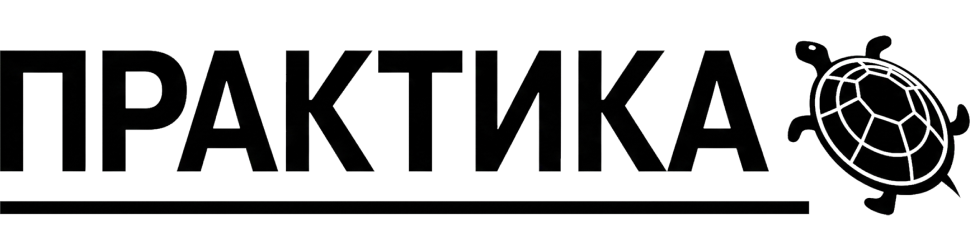
- Native name: НВО «Практика»
- Romanized name: NVO "Practika"
- Type: Joint-stock company
- Industry: Arms industry
- Founded: 1993; 33 years ago in Kyiv, Ukraine
- Website: practika.ua

Research and Production Association "Practika" is a Ukrainian armored vehicle manufacturer based in Kyiv, Ukraine. The company was founded in 1993.

== History ==
Practika was founded in 1993 as a manufacturer of heavy civilian equipment such as bank vaults.

In the early 2000s, Practika began designing armor upgrade kits for civilian vehicles. This work caught the attention of the Ukrainian Ministry of Defense. Practika was tasked with designing a new armored car for the Armed Forces of Ukraine, the Kozak. The first prototype of the vehicle, named Kozak-1, was unveiled at the Ukrainian Independence Day parade in Kyiv in 2009.

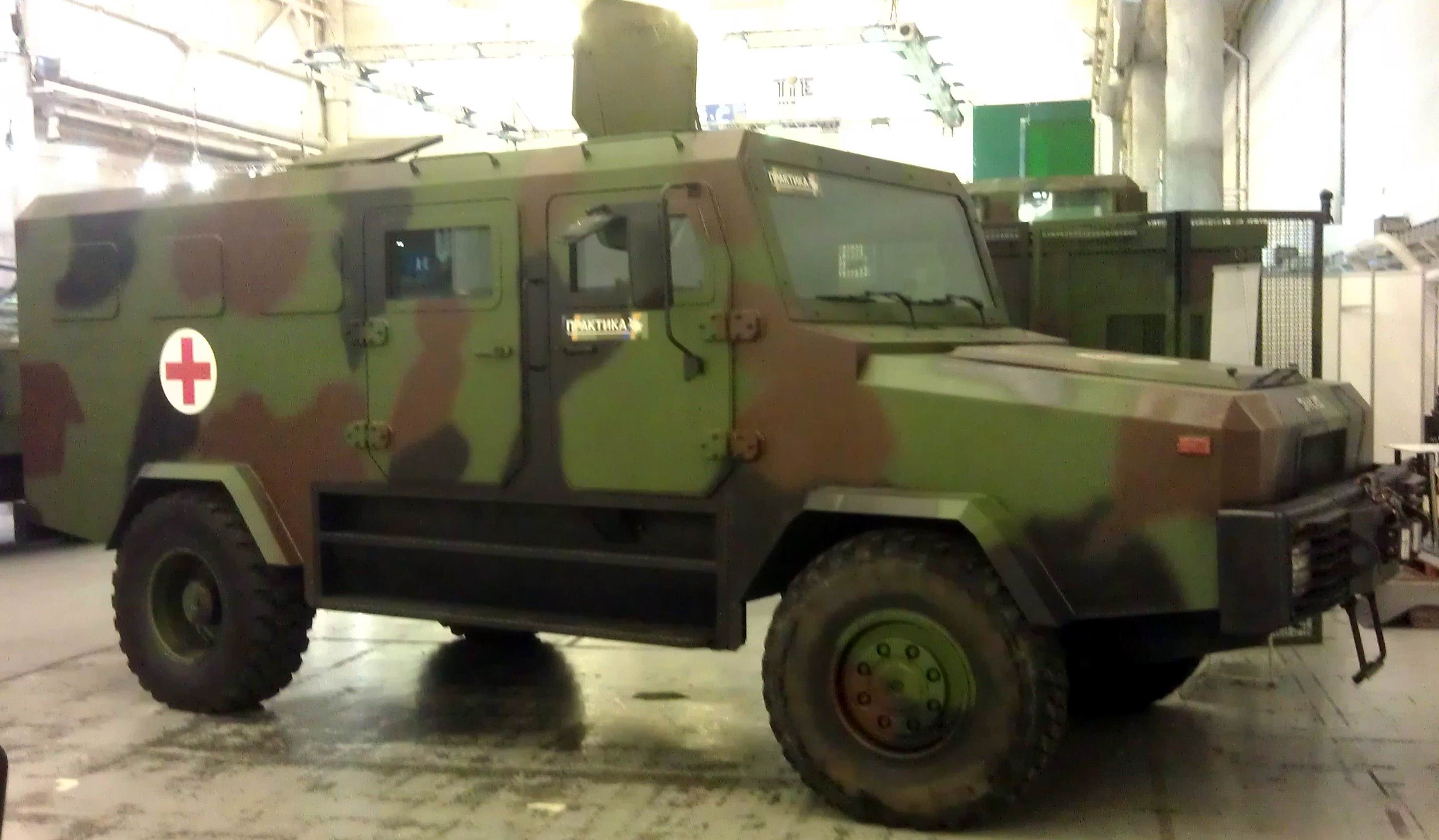
The Kozak-2014 prototype.

In 2014, a second prototype, named the Kozak-2014, was tested. This variant was the first to be classified as an armored personnel carrier rather than an armored car.

In 2015, the first production variant of the Kozak family, the Kozak-2, was tested and accepted into service with the Ukrainian Border Guard and the Ukrainian National Guard.

The latest variant of the Kozak family of APCs is the Kozak-7.
