= Kozak (armored personnel carrier) =

Ukrainian family of armored personnel carriers

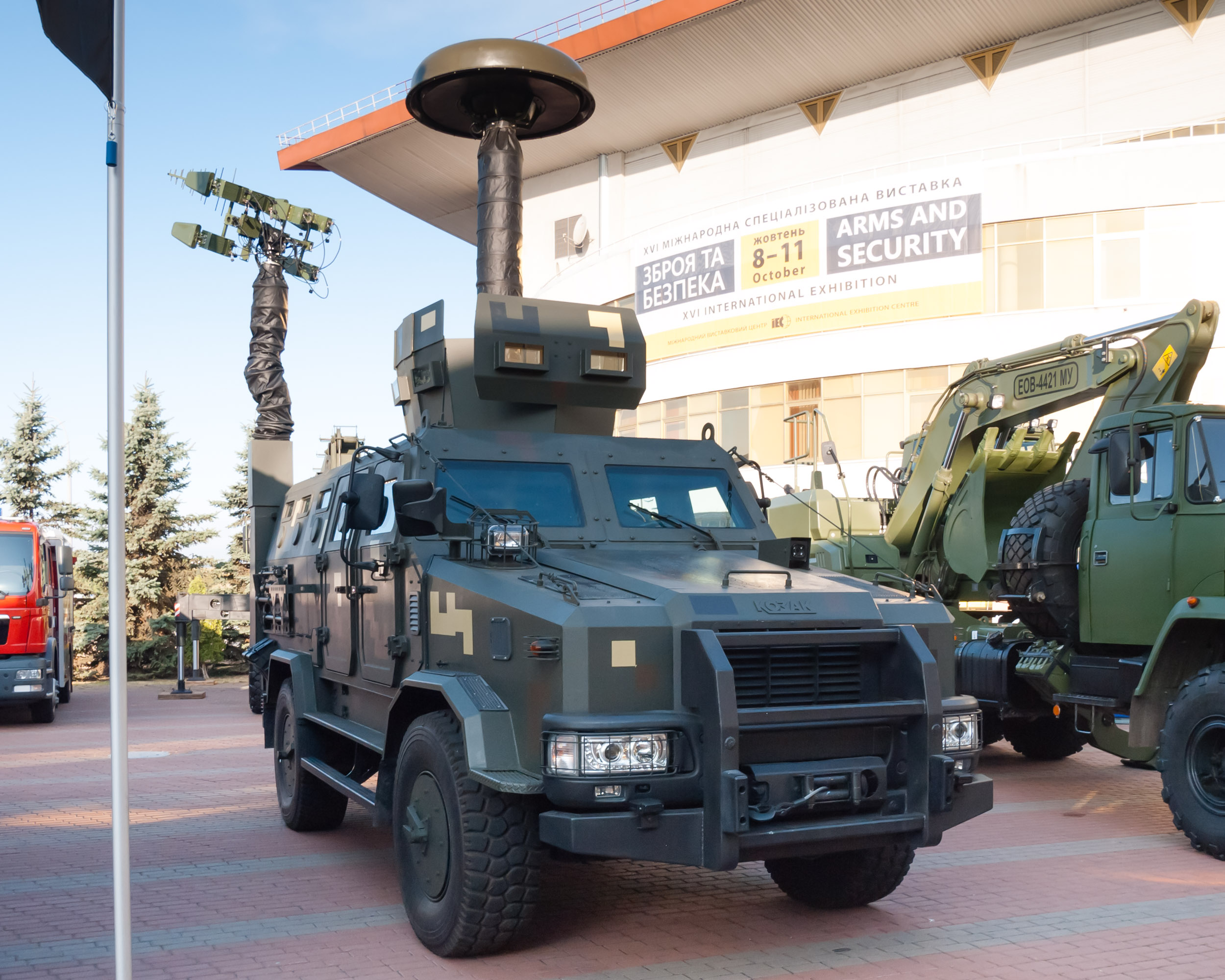
- Nota electronic warfare system on Kozak-2
- Type: Infantry mobility vehicle with MRAP capabilities
- Place of origin: Ukraine

Production history
- Designed: 2008–2009
- Manufacturer: Practika
- Produced: Prototype: 2009; Serial: 2014–present

Specifications
- Mass: 5.5 t
- Length: 5.475 m
- Width: 1.95 m
- Height: 2.3 m
- Crew: 5
- Armor: Steel
- Engine: Diesel; 176 hp
- Suspension: 4x4
- Maximum speed: 120 km/h

The Kozak (Ukrainian: Козак, romanized: Kozak, lit. 'Cossack') is a Ukrainian family of infantry mobility vehicles with a V-hull intended to transport personnel and various loads.

== Production ==
The vehicles are produced by the company Praktika, which specialized in Safes as well as bulletproof glass. The first Kozak vehicle (also known as Kozak-1) first appeared on August 24, 2009 at the Independence Day of Ukraine military parade in Kyiv.

Only two vehicles were manufactured prior to March 2014. The third vehicle (also known as "Kozak-2014") was built in November 2014 and was intended to be a proof of concept to address a growing requirement for a mobile MRAP. In March 2015 the vehicle was armed with the NSV machine gun.

Another variant, the Kozak-2, was built in 2015 and armed with an anti-tank guided missile system. It appeared at the 169th Training Centre in May 2015.

The Ukrainian Defense Ministry conducted comparative tests of 11 armored vehicles from various manufacturers in early 2016, but only three of them, including the Kozak-2, passed the state tests, the Ministry said. The trials of the Kozak-2M1, an improved tactical version of the Kozak-2, continued from October 2018 to July 2019, during which time the vehicle was tested with over 50 techniques and in a simulated combat environment.

The Defense Minister of Ukraine Stepan Poltorak on March 21, 2017 signed a decree officially adopting the "Kozak-2” into service.

In April 2025, Spanish company Tecnove signed announced the licensed production of Kozak and Dzhura armored personal vehicles in the town of Herencia, La Mancha.

== Variants ==
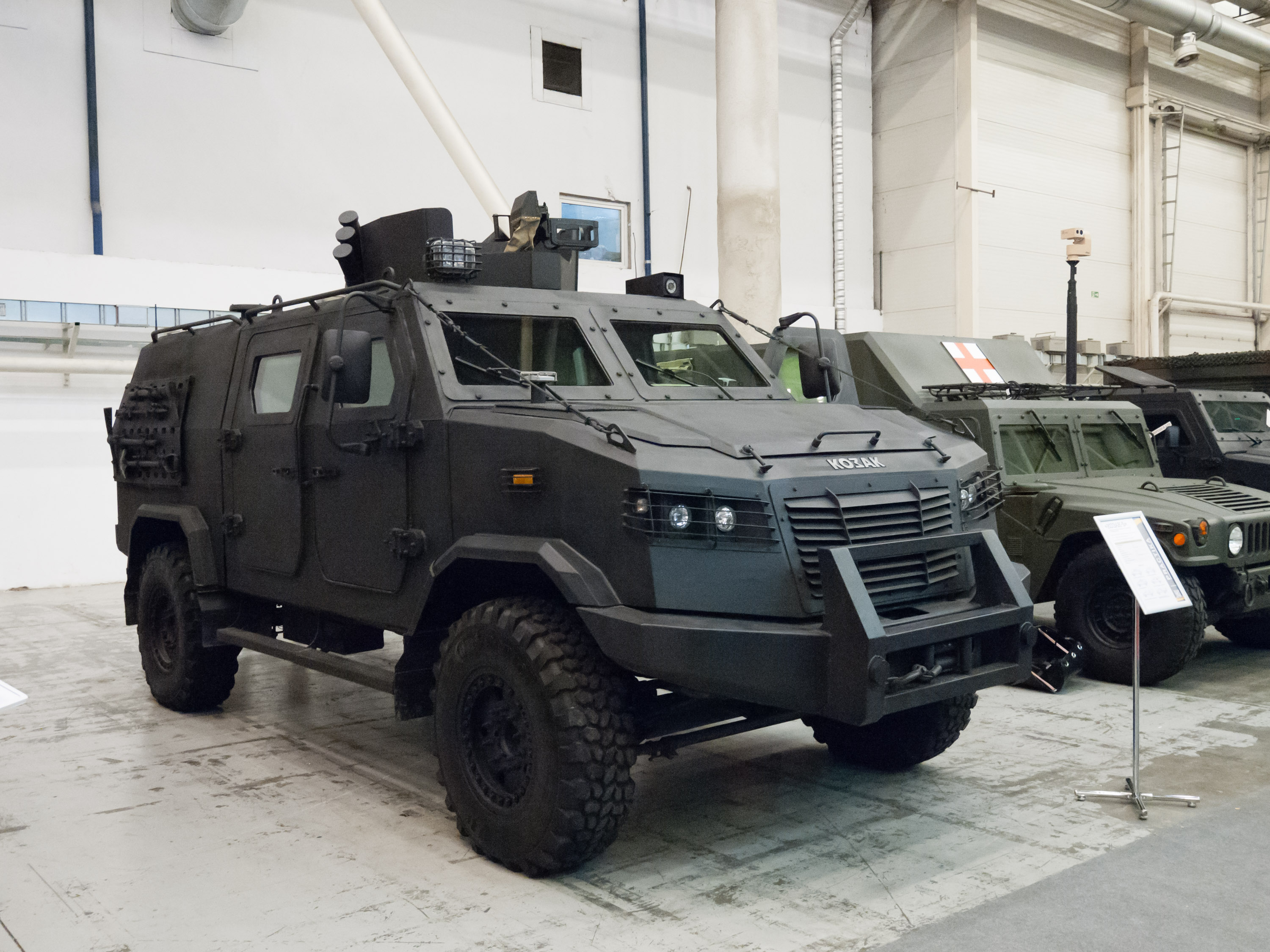
Kozak-5

- SRM-1 "Kozak-" (Ukrainian: СРМ-1 "Козак-1") – Light armored vehicle based on the Iveco Daily 55S18W 4x4 chassis
- "Kozak-001" (Ukrainian: "Козак-001") – The first production batch of the Kozak-2, adopted by the National Guard.
- "Kozak-2" (Ukrainian: "Козак-2") – Multipurpose armored vehicle combining durability and high operational payload with dynamic mobility and mine resistance. Based on the Iveco Eurocargo 4×4 truck chassis.
  - "Kozak-2M1" – An improved version of the Kozak-2, intended to be used as a tactical combat vehicle.
  - "Kozak-2M2" – A further upgrade to the Kozak-2M1.
- "Kozak-4" – A light armoured utility vehicle based on the Iveco Daily chassis.
- "Kozak-5" – A special operations vehicle for police and special forces, based on the commercially available Ford F550 chassis with the 6.7L engine, specially modified using the official Ford “DBL Design” conversion.

== Operators ==
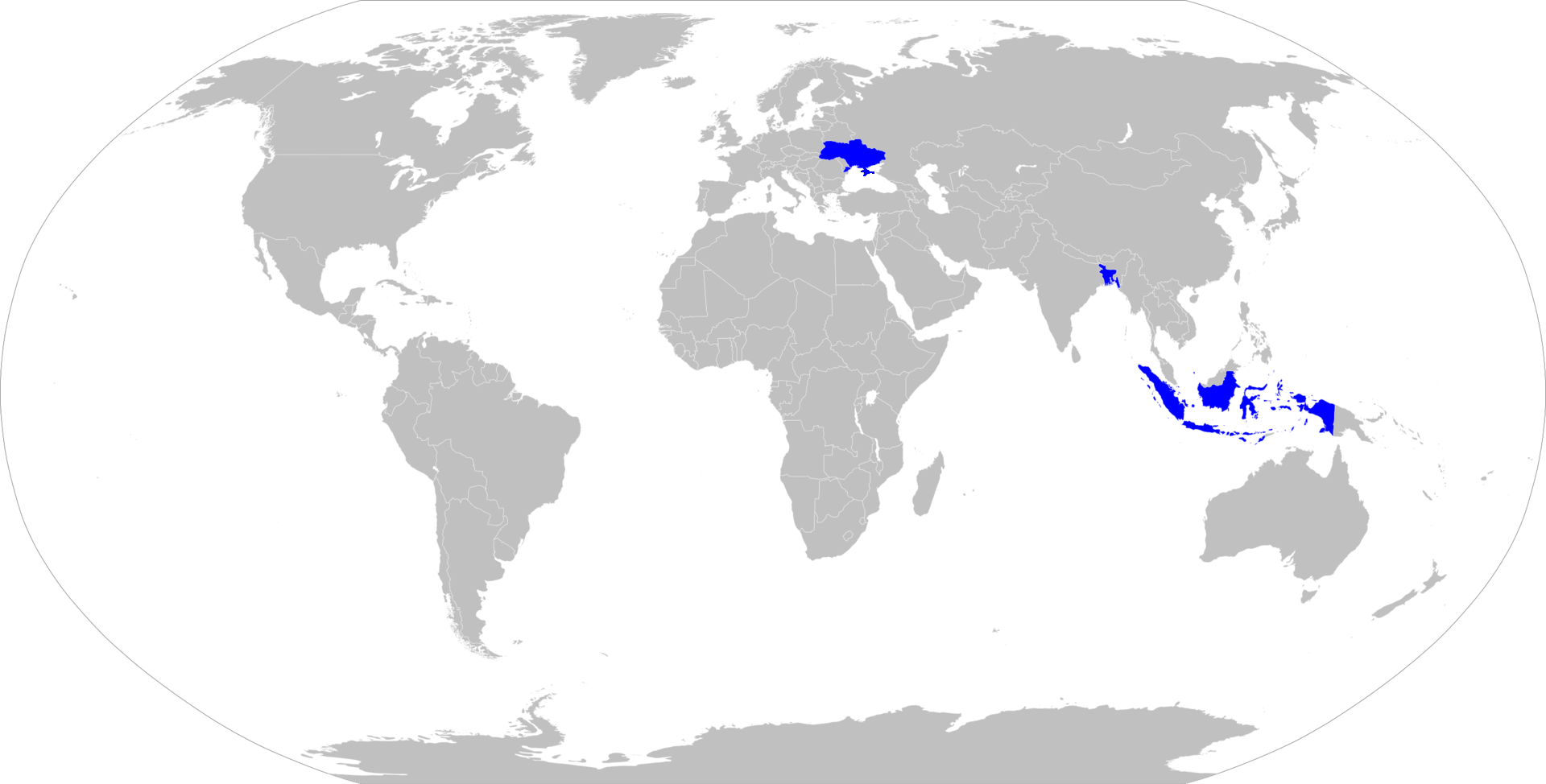
Operators of Kozak.

- Bangladesh
- Indonesia
- Saudi Arabia Kozak-5 variant
- Russia – captured several dozen vehicles during the Russian invasion of Ukraine in 2022.
- Belarus In (2023) - Belarusian special forces Vityaz captured show case, came to the country with parts of the Wagner PMC.; also operators from the Wagner PMC train with captured also KrAZ Cobra Belarusian territorial defence troops. (2023)
- Ukraine

- State Border Guard Service of Ukraine – received one "Kozak-2" on January 19, 2015. The second "Kozak-2" vehicle was received by the Border Guard Service on May 28, 2015. There were further deliveries.
- National Guard of Ukraine – received ten "Kozak-001" vehicles on July 6, 2015. There were further deliveries.
- National Police of Ukraine - Used by the Rapid Operational Response Unit and by the White Angels first responder units.
- Ukrainian Armed Forces - 44 Kozak 2M1 delivered in December 2021, with a further 15 Kozak 2M1 and 25 Kozak 5 in April 2024.

== Variants Gallery ==
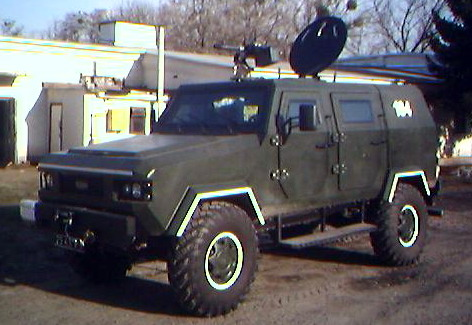
SRM-1 Kozak, predecessor to Kozak-2

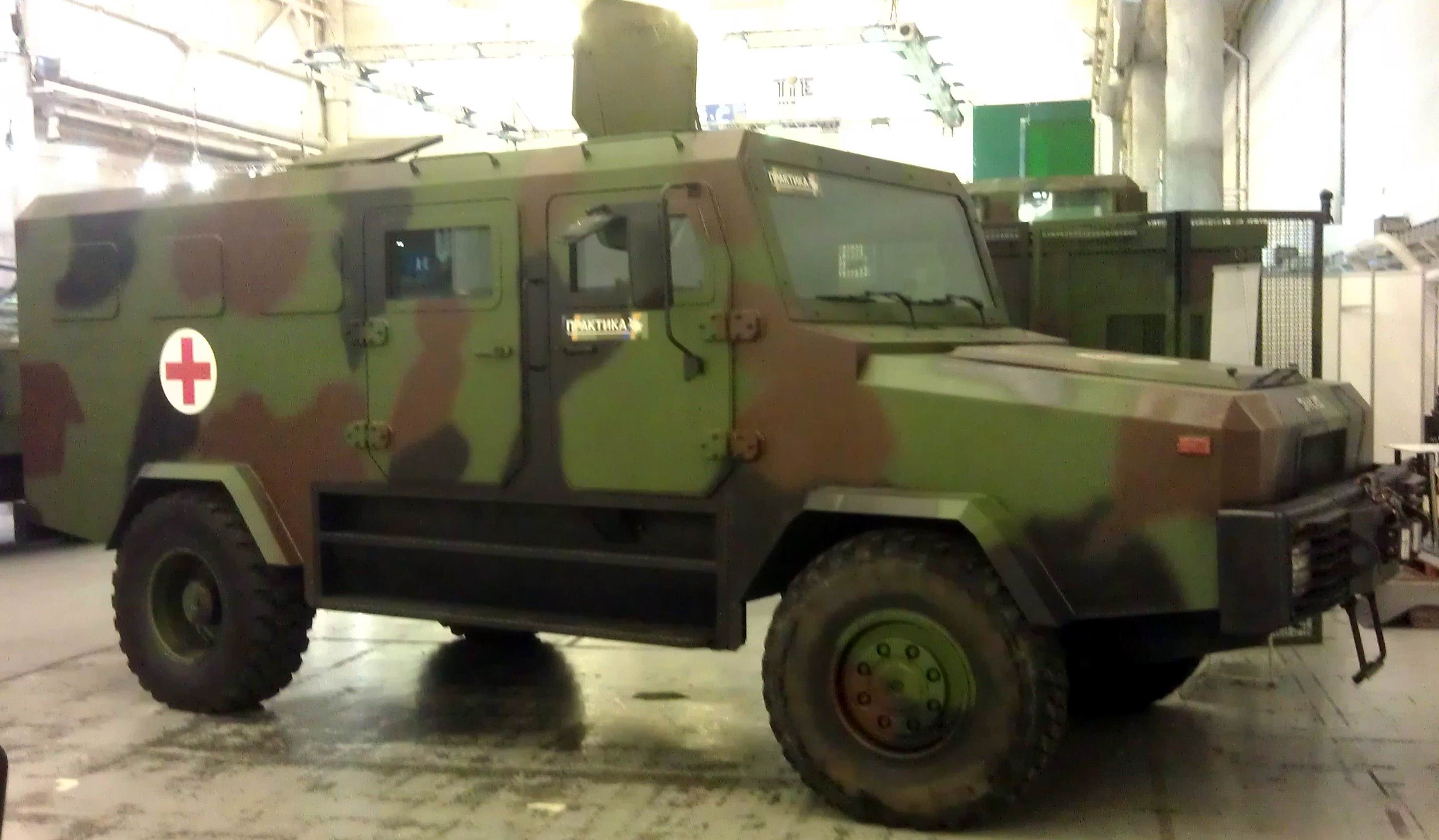
2014 Kozak prototype

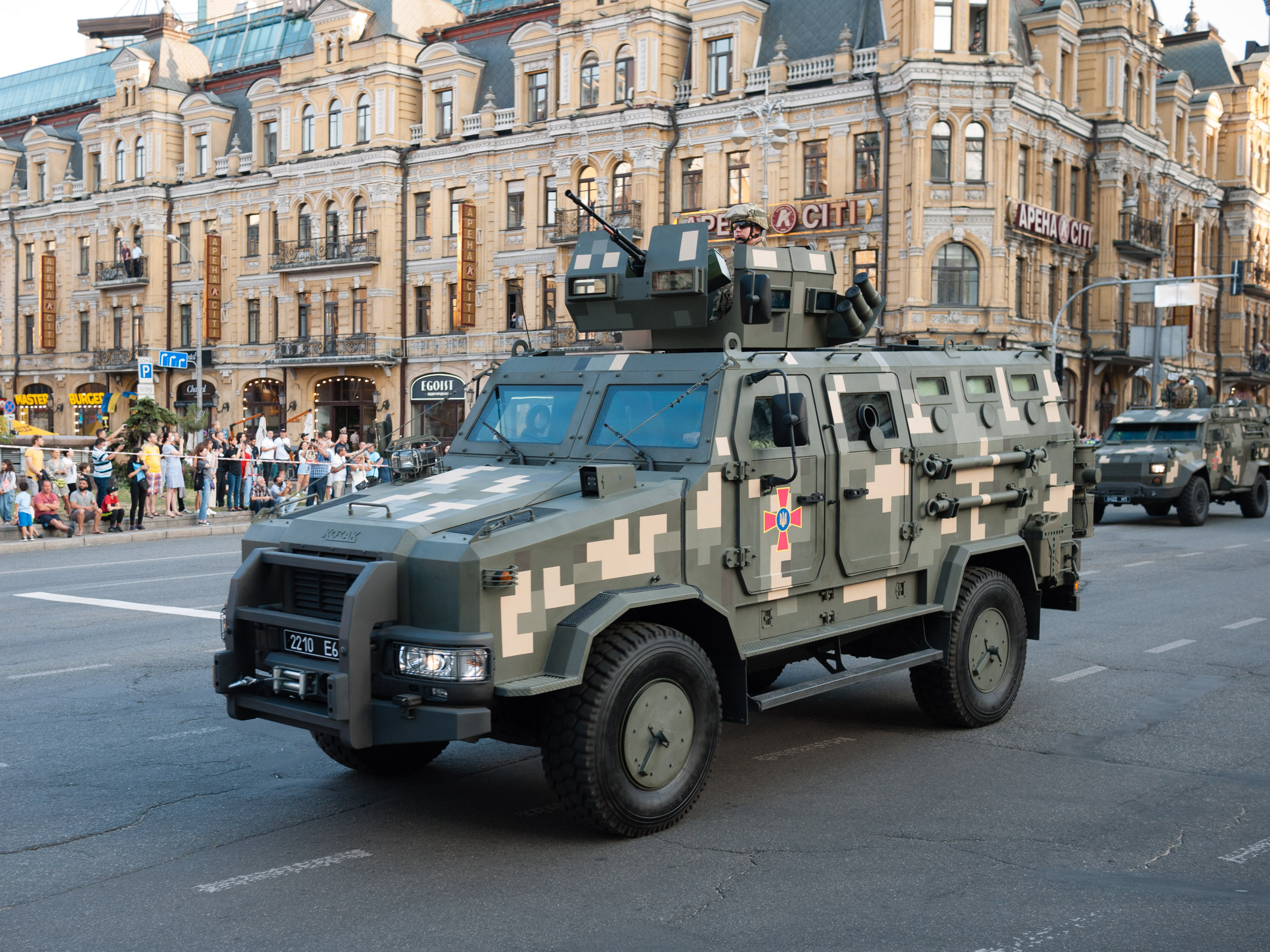
Kozak-2

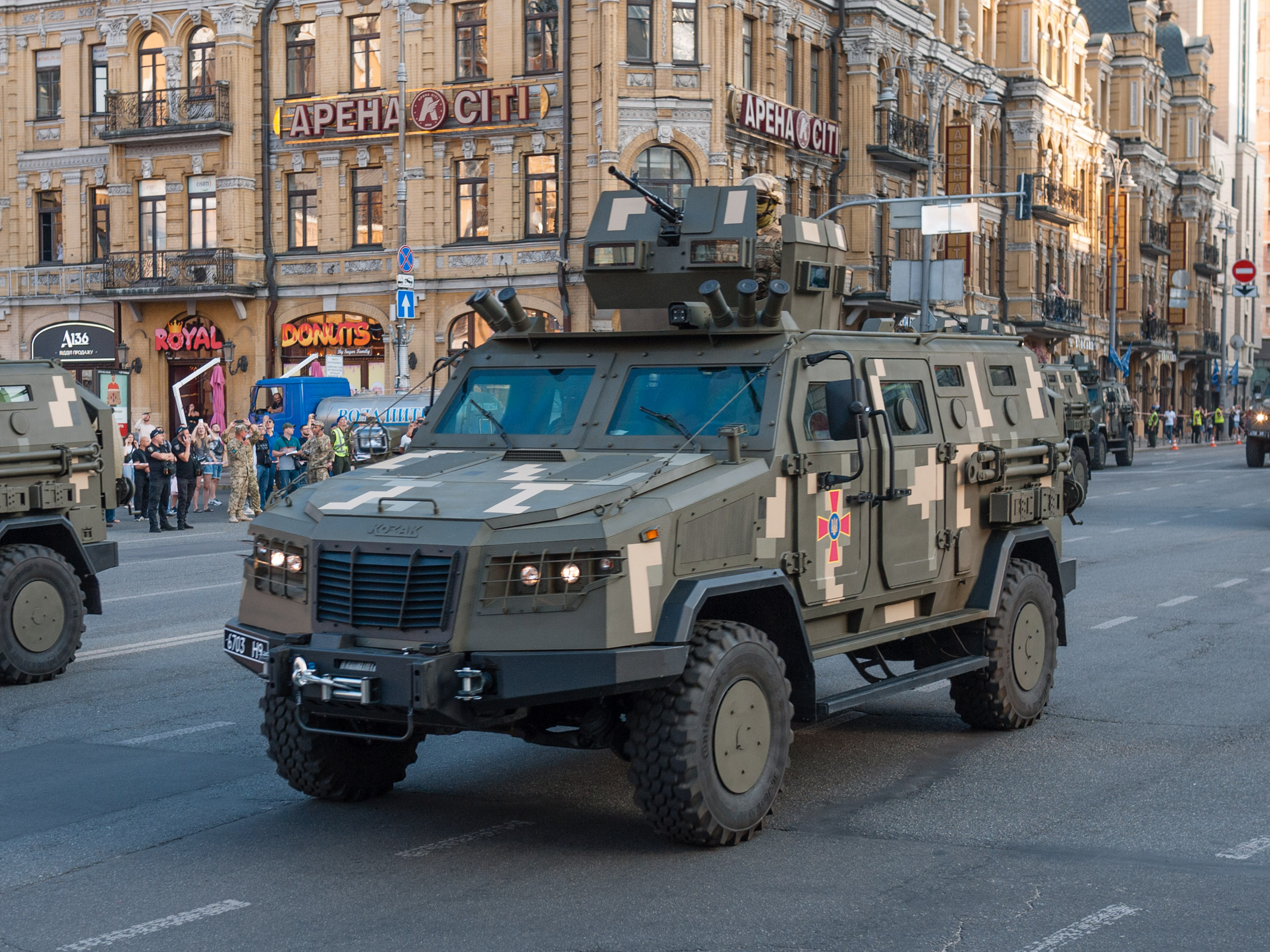
Kozak-2M

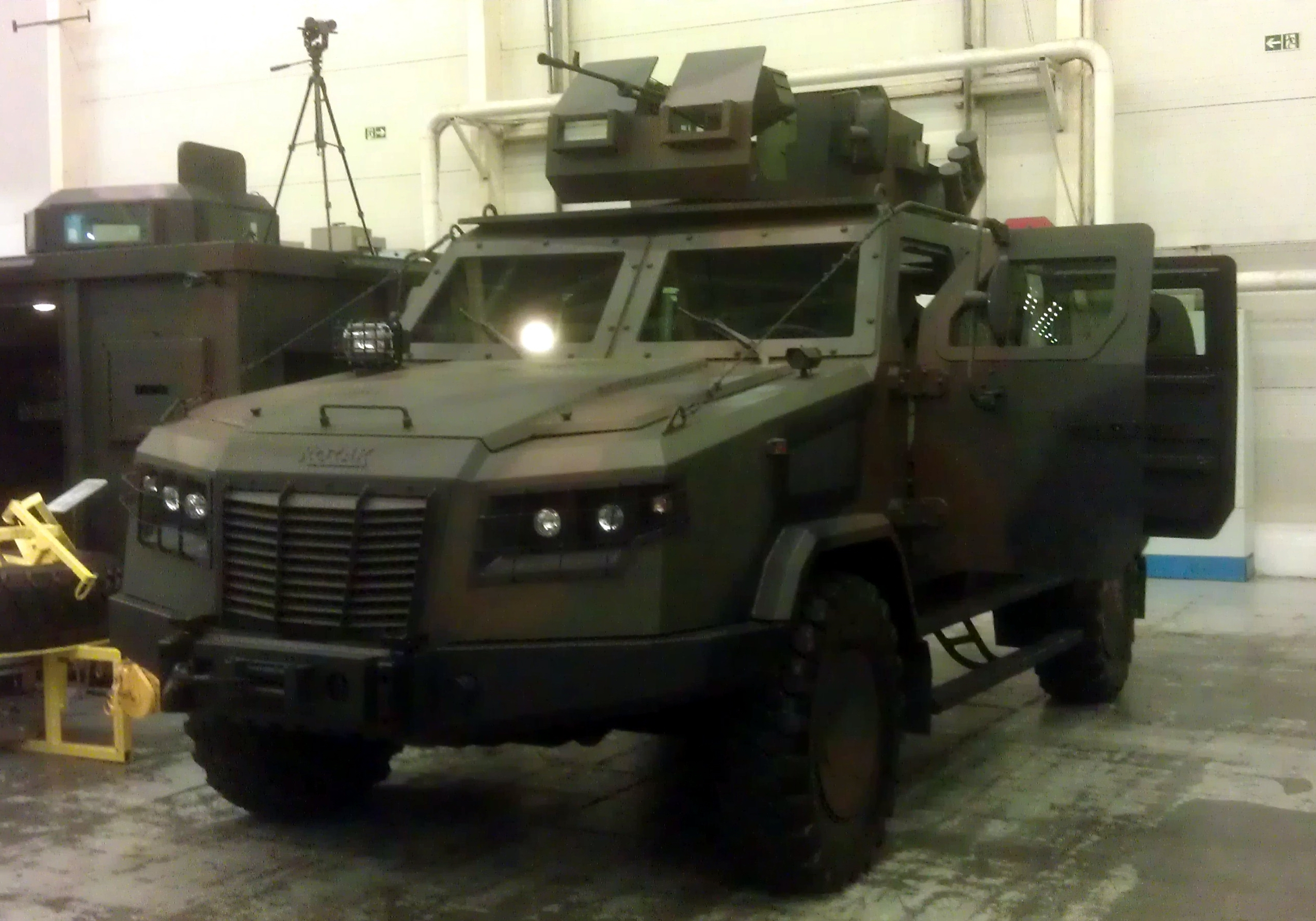
Kozak-2M1

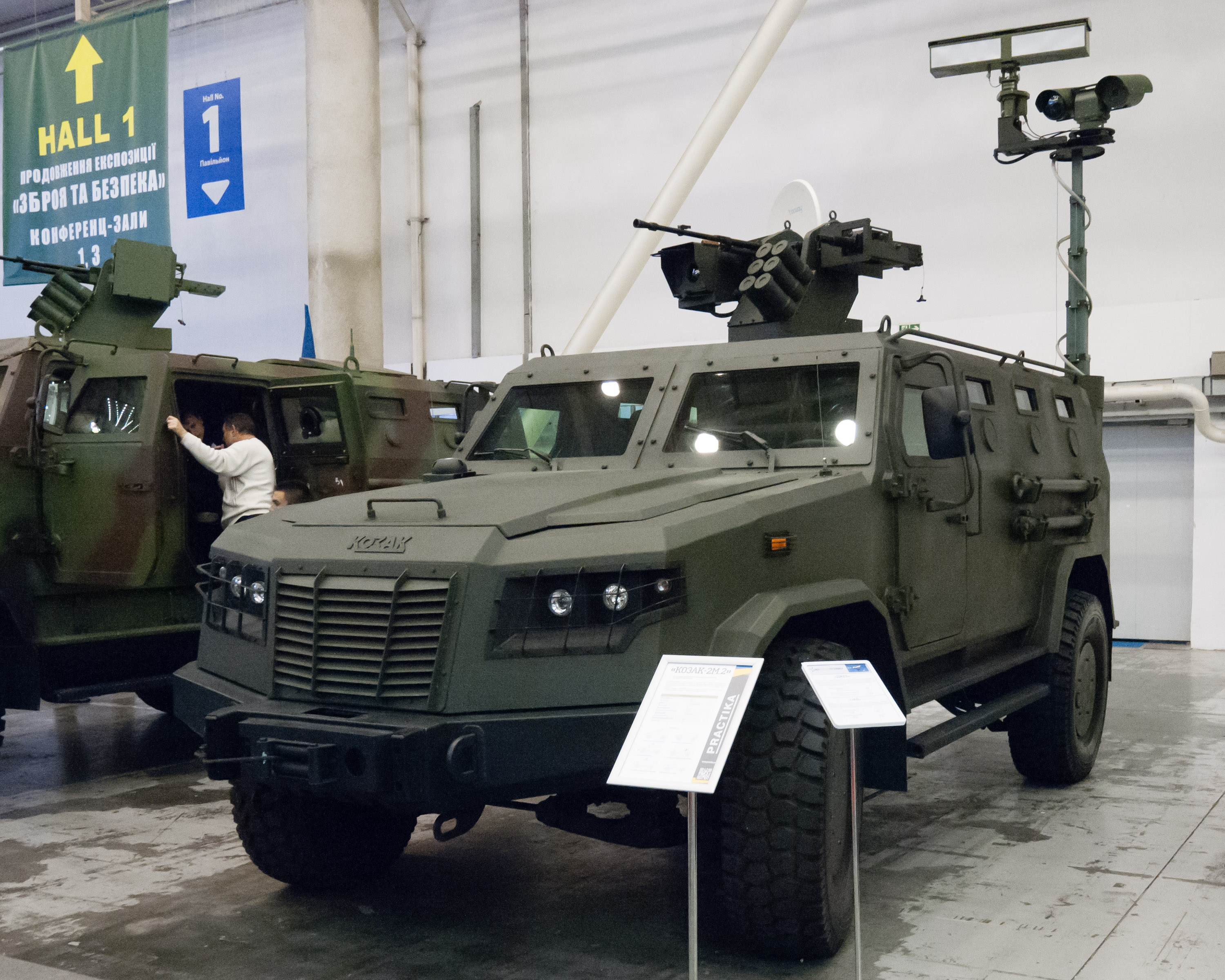
Kozak-2M2

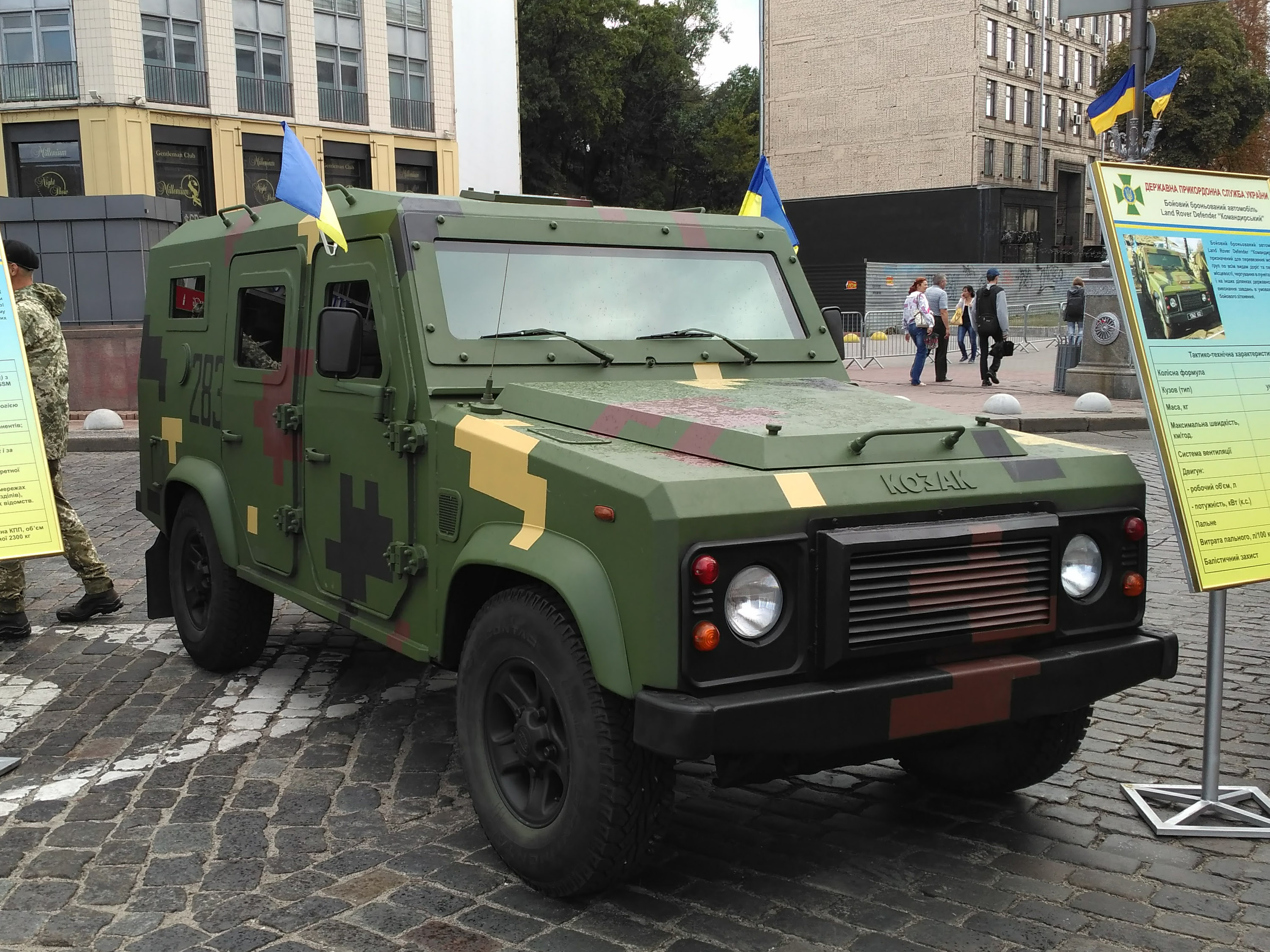
Kozak-4

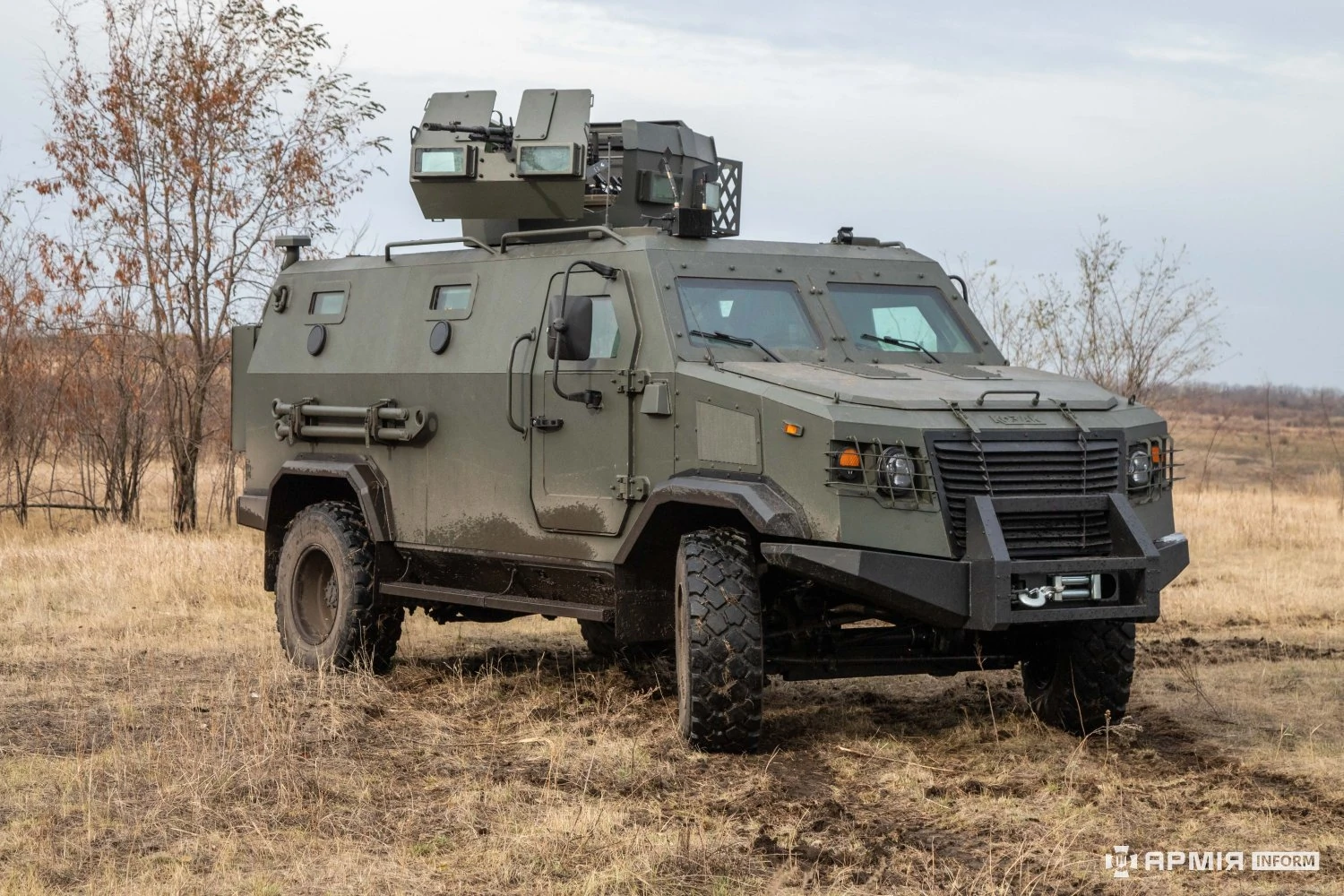
Kozak-5

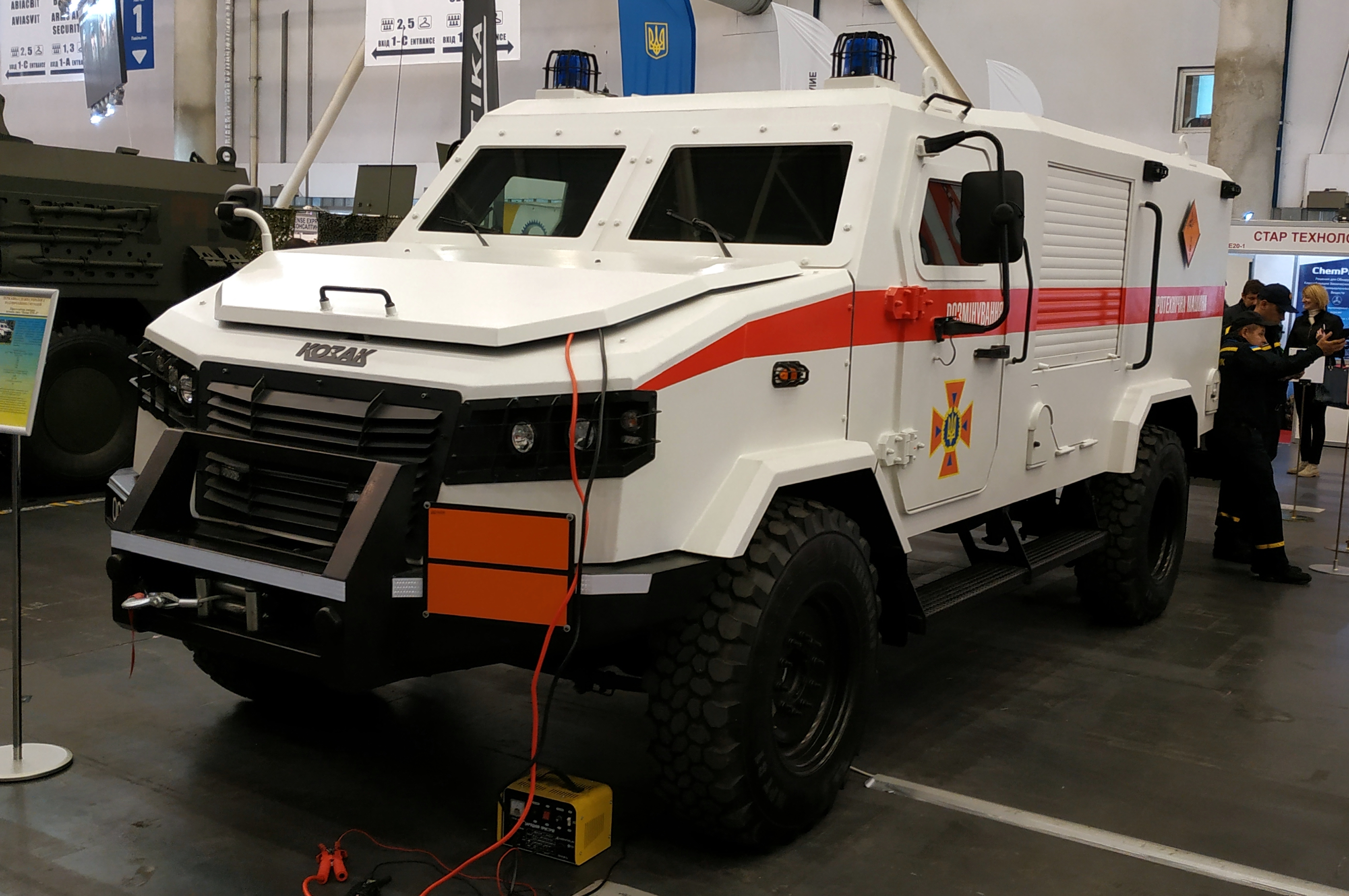
Kozak-5PML

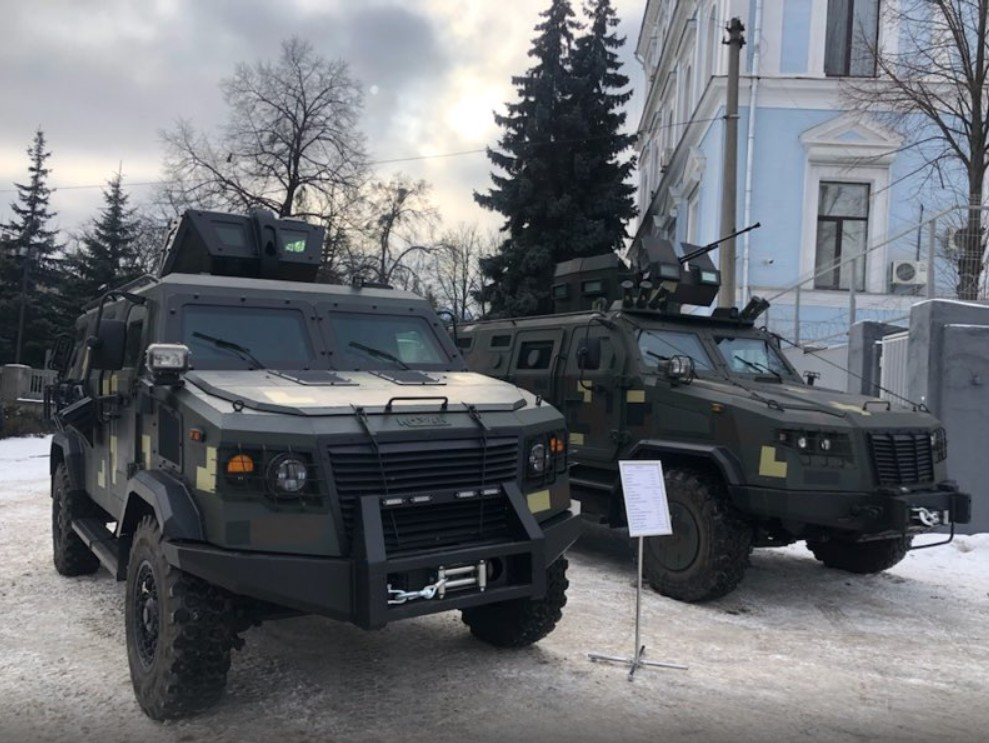
Kozak-7
